= 1980 United States presidential election in Connecticut =

- November 4, 1980
- Turnout: 82.8%

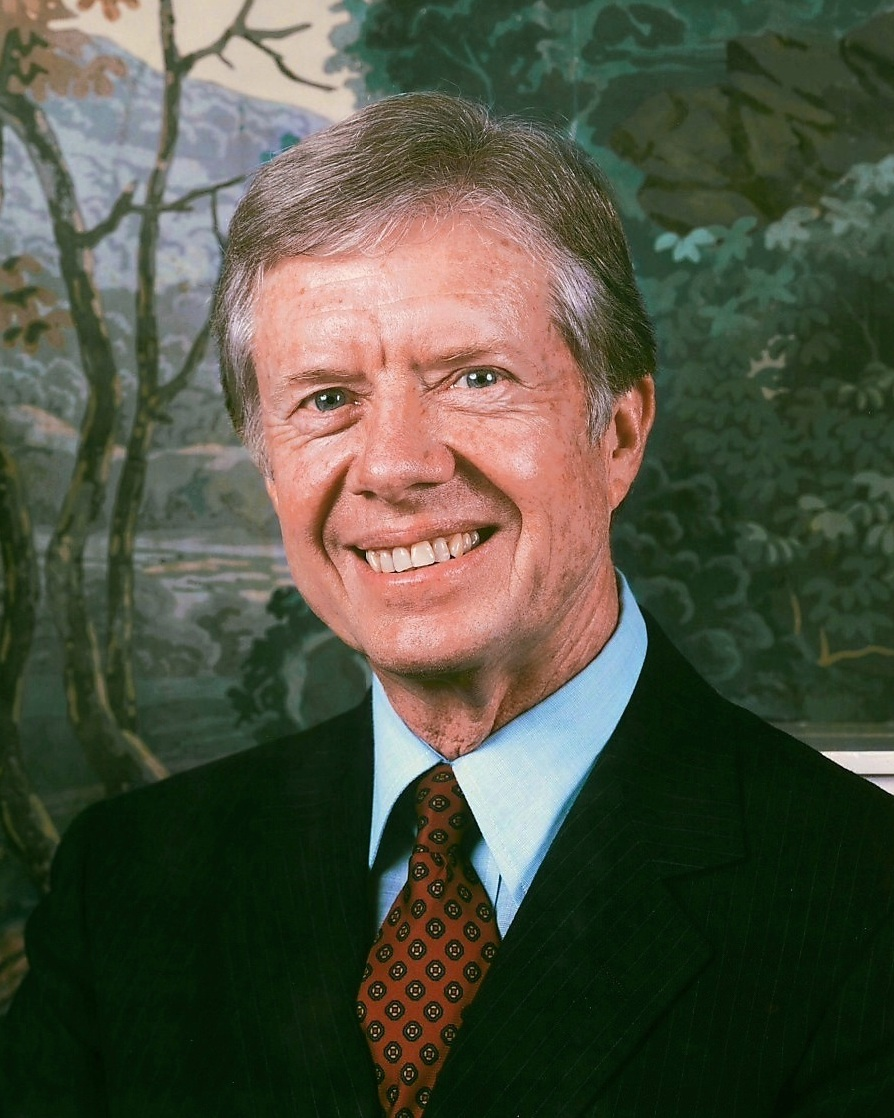

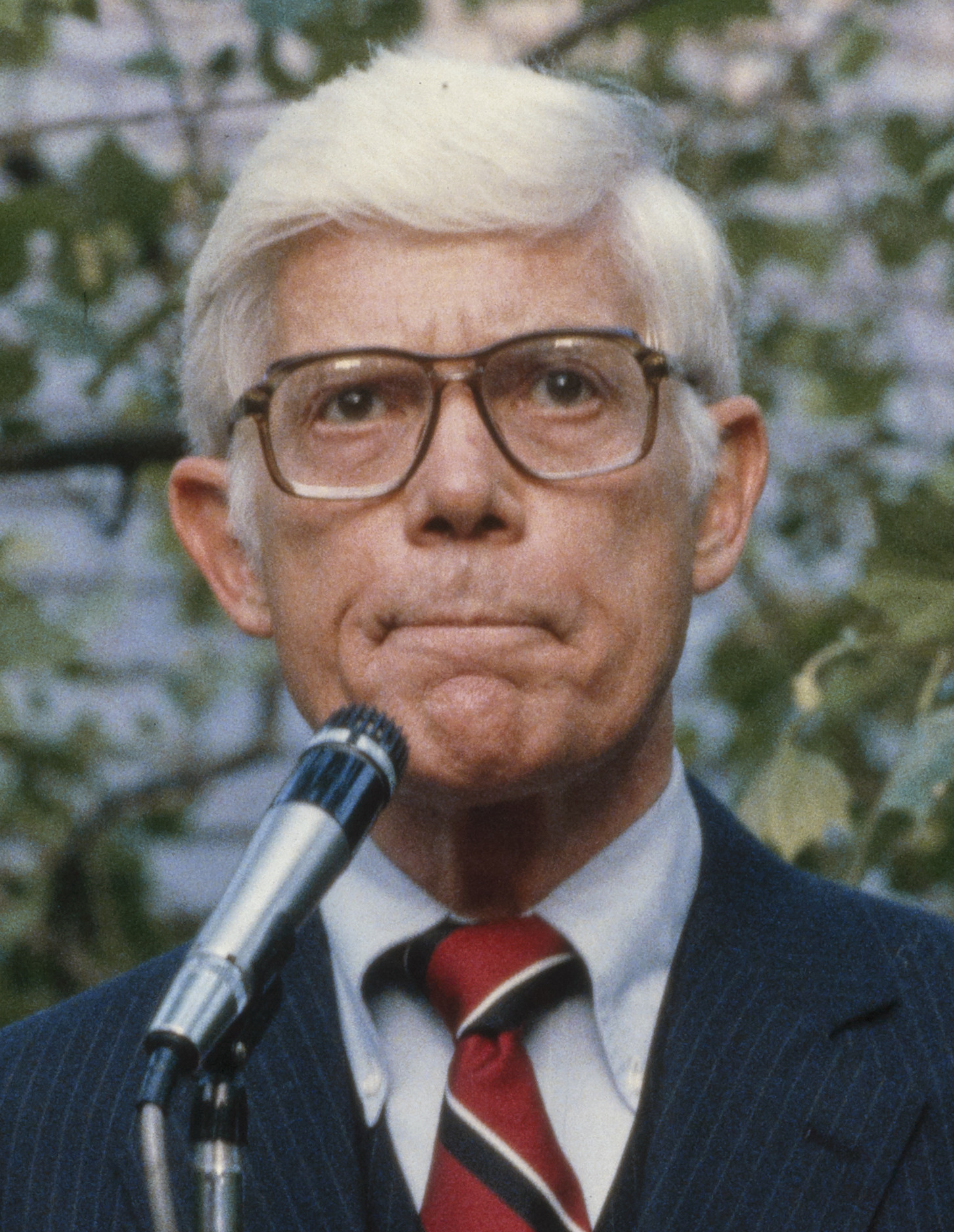
Nominee	Ronald Reagan	Jimmy Carter	John B. Anderson
Party	Republican	Democratic	Anderson Coalition (Note: Anderson’s party was listed on this state’s ballot as “Anderson Coalition”.)
Home state	California	Georgia	Illinois
Running mate	George H. W. Bush	Walter Mondale	Patrick Lucey
Electoral vote	8	0	0
Popular vote	677,210	541,732	171,807
Percentage	48.16%	38.52%	12.22%

Reagan
40–50%
50–60%
60–70%
Carter
40–50%
50–60%
60–70%
President before election
Jimmy Carter
Democratic
Elected President
Ronald Reagan
Republican

The 1980 United States presidential election in Connecticut took place on November 4, 1980. All 50 states and The District of Columbia, were part of the 1980 United States presidential election. Voters chose eight electors to the Electoral College, who voted for president and vice president.

Connecticut was won by former California Governor Ronald Reagan by 10 points. President of the United States Jimmy Carter failed to gain reelection against Reagan. Connecticut election results reflect the Republican Party's re-consolidation under what is popularly called the "Reagan Revolution," which sounded overwhelming conservative electoral victories across the United States.

The already embattled incumbent Democratic president Carter was hurt in the state by the strong third party candidacy of John Anderson, a liberal Republican Congressman who ran in 1980 as an independent after failing to win the Republican Party's own presidential nomination. Anderson proved very popular with liberal and moderate voters in New England who normally leaned Democratic but were dissatisfied with the policies of the Carter Administration and viewed Reagan as too far to the right. New England overall would prove to be Anderson's strongest region in the nation, with all 6 New England states giving double-digit percentages to Anderson. In fact, Connecticut would prove to be Anderson's fifth strongest state in the nation after Massachusetts, Vermont, Rhode Island and New Hampshire. His 12.22% of the vote in the state was nearly double the 6.61% he got nationwide. Connecticut did however, vote approximately 0.1% more Democratic than the national average.

== Results ==
1980 United States presidential election in Connecticut
Party	Candidate	Running mate	Popular vote		Electoral vote	
Party	Candidate	Running mate	Count	%	Count	%
Republican	Ronald Reagan of California	George Bush of Texas	677,210	48.16%	8	100.00%
Democratic	Jimmy Carter of Georgia (incumbent)	Walter Mondale of Minnesota (incumbent)	541,732	38.52%	0	0.00%
Anderson Coalition	John B. Anderson	Patrick Lucey	171,807	12.22%	0	0.00%
Libertarian	Ed Clark of California	David H. Koch of Kansas	8,570	0.61%	0	0.00%
Citizens	Barry Commoner of Missouri	La Donna Harris of Oklahoma	6,130	0.44%	0	0.00%
Write-ins			836	0.06%	0	0.00%
Total			1,406,285	100.00%	8	100.00%

=== By county ===
County	Ronald Reagan Republican		Jimmy Carter Democratic		Various candidates Other parties		Margin		Total votes cast
County	#	%	#	%	#	%	#	%	Total votes cast
Fairfield	201,997	54.88%	124,074	33.71%	42,027	11.41%	77,923	21.17%	368,098
Hartford	150,265	40.46%	164,643	44.33%	56,472	15.21%	-14,378	-3.87%	371,380
Litchfield	38,725	50.72%	26,705	34.98%	10,924	14.30%	12,020	15.74%	76,354
Middlesex	28,989	45.53%	24,768	38.90%	9,915	15.57%	4,221	6.63%	63,672
New Haven	169,038	50.05%	130,913	38.76%	37,781	11.19%	38,125	11.29%	337,732
New London	47,217	47.96%	36,628	37.21%	14,603	14.83%	10,589	10.75%	98,448
Tolland	22,127	43.95%	18,557	36.86%	9,662	19.19%	3,570	7.09%	50,346
Windham	18,852	47.82%	15,444	39.18%	5,123	13.00%	3,408	8.64%	39,419
Totals	677,210	48.16%	541,732	38.52%	187,343	13.32%	135,478	9.64%	1,406,285

==== Counties flipped from Democratic to Republican ====
- Windham

=== Results by congressional district ===
District	Reagan	Carter	Representative
1st	39.2%	46.2%	William R. Cotter
2nd	46.9%	38.7%	Chris Dodd (96th Congress)
2nd	46.9%	38.7%	Sam Gejdenson (97th Congress)
3rd	50.8%	39.2%	Robert Giaimo (96th Congress)
3rd	50.8%	39.2%	Lawrence J. DeNardis (97th Congress)
4th	53.1%	36.9%	Stewart McKinney
5th	54.6%	34.3%	William R. Ratchford
6th	47.7%	38.6%	Toby Moffett

== See also ==
- United States presidential elections in Connecticut
- Presidency of Ronald Reagan
