= List of United States representatives from Connecticut =

The following is an alphabetical list of United States representatives from the state of Connecticut. For chronological tables of members of both houses of the United States Congress from the state (through the present day), see Connecticut's congressional delegations. The list of names should be complete, but other data may be incomplete.

== Current representatives ==
Current as of January 3, 2019.

- 1st district: John B. Larson (D) (since 1999)
- 2nd district: Joe Courtney (D) (since 2007)
- 3rd district: Rosa DeLauro (D) (since 1991)
- 4th district: Jim Himes (D) (since 2009)
- 5th district: Jahana Hayes (D) (since 2019)

== List of members ==
Member	Years	Party	District	Electoral history
John Allen	March 4, 1797 – March 4, 1799	Federalist	At-large	Elected early in 1798. Re-elected in 1798 but declined to serve.
Samuel Arnold	March 4, 1857 – March 4, 1859	Democratic	2nd	Elected in 1857. Retired.
Albert E. Austin	January 3, 1939 – January 3, 1941	Republican	4th	Elected in 1938. Lost re-election to Downs.
Charles Montague Bakewell	March 4, 1933 – January 3, 1935	Republican	At-large	Elected in 1932. Lost re-election to Citron.
John Baldwin	March 4, 1825 – March 4, 1829	Anti-Jacksonian	At-large	Elected in 1825. Retired.
Simeon Baldwin	October 17, 1803 – March 4, 1805	Federalist	At-large	Elected to finish Perkins's term. Retired.
Thomas R. Ball	January 3, 1939 – January 3, 1941	Republican	2nd	Elected in 1938. Lost re-election to Fitzgerald.
Noyes Barber	March 4, 1821 – March 4, 1825	Democratic-Republican	At-large	Elected in 1821. Changed parties.
Noyes Barber	March 4, 1825 – March 4, 1835	Anti-Jacksonian	At-large	Re-elected in 1825 as an Anti-Jacksonian. Lost re-election to six others. (Note: Ingham, Toucey, Wildman, Haley, Phelps, Judson.)
William H. Barnum	March 4, 1867 – May 18, 1876	Democratic	4th	Elected in 1867. Resigned after being elected U.S. Senator.
Nathan Belcher	March 4, 1853 – March 4, 1855	Democratic	3rd	Elected in 1853. Retired.
William D. Bishop	March 4, 1857 – March 4, 1859	Democratic	4th	Elected in 1857. Lost re-election to Ferry.
William W. Boardman	December 7, 1840 – March 4, 1843	Whig	2nd	Elected to finish Storrs's term. Retired.
Walter Booth	March 4, 1849 – March 4, 1851	Free Soil	2nd	Elected in 1849. Lost re-election to Ingersoll.
Chester Bowles	January 3, 1959 – January 3, 1961	Democratic	2nd	Elected in 1958. Retired.
Jonathan Brace	December 3, 1798 – May, 1800	Federalist	At-large	Elected to finish Coit's term. Resigned.
Augustus Brandegee	March 4, 1863 – March 4, 1867	Republican	3rd	Elected in 1863. Retired.
Frank B. Brandegee	November 4, 1902 – May 10, 1905	Republican	3rd	Elected to finish Russell's term. Resigned after being elected U.S. Senator.
John H. Brockway	March 4, 1839 – March 4, 1843	Whig	5th	Elected in 1839. Retired.
John R. Buck	March 4, 1881 – March 4, 1883	Republican	1st	Elected in 1880. Lost re-election to Eaton.
John R. Buck	March 4, 1885 – March 4, 1887	Republican	1st	Elected in 1884. Lost re-election to Vance.
Alfred A. Burnham	March 4, 1859 – March 4, 1863	Republican	3rd	Elected in 1859. Retired.
Daniel Burrows	March 4, 1821 – March 4, 1823	Democratic-Republican	At-large	Elected in 1821. Lost re-election to six others. (Note: Tomlinson, Stoddard, Sterling, Whitman, Barber, and Foot.)
Thomas B. Butler	March 4, 1849 – March 4, 1851	Whig	4th	Elected in 1849. Lost re-election to Seymour.
George S. Catlin	March 4, 1843 – March 4, 1845	Democratic	3rd	Elected in 1843. Retired.
Epaphroditus Champion	March 4, 1807 – March 4, 1817	Federalist	At-large	Elected in 1806. Lost re-election to seven others. (Note: Backus, Sherwood, Dennison, Pitlkin, T. S. Williams, Moseley, and Holmes.)
Charles Chapman	March 4, 1851 – March 4, 1853	Whig	1st	Elected in 1851. Lost re-election to Pratt.
William M. Citron	January 3, 1935 – January 3, 1939	Democratic	At-large	Elected in 1934. Lost re-election to Monkiewicz.
Ezra Clark Jr.	March 4, 1855 – March 4, 1857	Know Nothing	1st	Elected in 1855. Changed parties.
Ezra Clark Jr.	March 4, 1857 – March 4, 1859	Republican	1st	Re-elected in 1857 as a Republican. Lost renomination to Loomis.
Chauncey Fitch Cleveland	March 4, 1849 – March 4, 1853	Democratic	3rd	Elected in 1849. Retired.
Joshua Coit	March 4, 1793 – March 4, 1795	Pro-Administration	At-large	Elected in 1792. Changed parties.
Joshua Coit	March 4, 1795 – September 5, 1798	Federalist	At-large	Re-elected in 1794 as a Federalist. Died.
Ranulf Compton	January 3, 1943 – January 3, 1945	Republican	3rd	Elected in 1942. Lost re-election to Geelan.
William R. Cotter	January 3, 1971 – September 8, 1981	Democratic	1st	Elected in 1970. Died.
Joe Courtney	January 3, 2007 – present	Democratic	2nd	Elected in 2006. Incumbent.
Albert W. Cretella	January 3, 1953 – January 3, 1959	Republican	3rd	Elected in 1952. Lost re-election to Giaimo.
Emilio Q. Daddario	January 3, 1959 – January 3, 1971	Democratic	1st	Elected in 1958. Retired to run for governor.
Samuel W. Dana	January 3, 1797 – May 10, 1810	Federalist	At-large	Elected to finish Tracy's term. Resigned after being elected U.S. Senator.
James Davenport	December 5, 1796 – August 3, 1797	Federalist	At-large	Elected to finish Hillhouse's term. Died.
John Davenport	March 4, 1799 – March 4, 1817	Federalist	At-large	Elected in 1798. Retired.
Robert E. De Forest	March 4, 1891 – March 4, 1895	Democratic	4th	Elected in 1890. Lost re-election to Hill.
Sidney Dean	March 4, 1855 – March 4, 1857	Know Nothing	3rd	Elected in 1855. Changed parties.
Sidney Dean	March 4, 1857 – March 4, 1859	Republican	3rd	Re-elected in 1857 as a Republican. Retired.
Rosa DeLauro	January 3, 1991 – present	Democratic	3rd	Elected in 1990. Incumbent.
Henry C. Deming	March 4, 1863 – March 4, 1867	Republican	1st	Elected in 1863. Lost re-election to Hubbard.
Lawrence J. DeNardis	January 3, 1981 – January 3, 1983	Republican	3rd	Elected in 1980. Lost re-election to Morrison.
James Dixon	March 4, 1845 – March 4, 1849	Whig	1st	Elected in 1845. Retired.
Chris Dodd	January 3, 1975 – January 3, 1981	Democratic	2nd	Elected in 1974. Retired to run for U.S. Senator.
Thomas J. Dodd	January 3, 1953 – January 3, 1957	Democratic	1st	Elected in 1952. Retired to run for U.S. Senator.
Jeremiah Donovan	March 4, 1913 – March 4, 1915	Democratic	4th	Elected in 1912. Lost re-election to Hill.
Le Roy D. Downs	January 3, 1941 – January 3, 1943	Democratic	4th	Elected in 1940. Lost re-election to Luce.
Theodore Dwight	December 1, 1806 – March 4, 1807	Federalist	At-large	Elected to finish J. C. Smith's term. Retired.
William W. Eaton	March 4, 1883 – March 4, 1885	Democratic	1st	Elected in 1882. Lost re-election to Buck.
William Edmond	November 13, 1797 – March 4, 1801	Federalist	At-large	Elected to finish Davenport's term. Re-elected in 1800 but declined to serve.
Henry W. Edwards	March 4, 1819 – March 4, 1823	Democratic-Republican	At-large	Elected in 1818. Lost re-election to 6 others.
William W. Ellsworth	March 4, 1829 – July 8, 1834	Anti-Jacksonian	At-large	Elected in 1829. Resigned.
James E. English	March 4, 1861 – March 4, 1865	Democratic	2nd	Elected in 1861. Retired.
Elizabeth Esty	January 3, 2013 – January 3, 2019	Democratic	5th	Elected in 2012. Retired.
E. Hart Fenn	March 4, 1921 – March 4, 1931	Republican	1st	Elected in 1920. Retired.
Orris S. Ferry	March 4, 1859 – March 4, 1861	Republican	4th	Elected in 1859. Lost re-election to G. Woodruff.
William J. Fitzgerald	January 3, 1937 – January 3, 1939	Democratic	2nd	Elected in 1936. Lost re-election to Ball.
William J. Fitzgerald	January 3, 1941 – January 3, 1943	Democratic	2nd	Elected in 1940. Lost re-election to McWilliams.
Samuel A. Foot	March 4, 1819 – March 4, 1821	Federalist	At-large	Elected in 1818. Retired.
Samuel A. Foot	March 4, 1823 – March 4, 1825	Democratic-Republican	At-large	Elected in 1823. Lost re-election to six others. (Note: Tomlinson, Phelps, Ingersoll, Merwin, Barber, and Baldwin.)
Samuel A. Foot	March 4, 1833 – May 9, 1834	Anti-Jacksonian	At-large	Elected in 1833. Resigned after being elected governor.
Ellsworth Foote	January 3, 1947 – January 3, 1949	Republican	3rd	Elected in 1946. Lost re-election to McGuire.
Gary Franks	January 3, 1991 – January 3, 1997	Republican	5th	Elected in 1990. Lost re-election to Maloney.
Richard P. Freeman	March 4, 1915 – March 4, 1933	Republican	2nd	Elected in 1914. Lost renomination to Higgins.
Carlos French	March 4, 1887 – March 4, 1889	Democratic	2nd	Elected in 1886. Retired.
James P. Geelan	January 3, 1945 – January 3, 1947	Democratic	3rd	Elected in 1944. Lost re-election to E. Foote.
Sam Gejdenson	January 3, 1981 – January 3, 2001	Democratic	2nd	Elected in 1980. Lost re-election to Simmons.
Robert Giaimo	January 3, 1959 – January 3, 1981	Democratic	3rd	Elected in 1958. Retired.
Sylvester Gilbert	November 6, 1818 – March 4, 1819	Democratic-Republican	At-large	Elected to finish Holmes's term. Retired.
James P. Glynn	March 4, 1915 – March 4, 1923	Republican	5th	Elected in 1914. Lost re-election to O'Sullivan.
James P. Glynn	March 4, 1925 – March 6, 1930	Republican	5th	Elected in 1924. Died.
Calvin Goddard	May 14, 1801 – ????, 1805	Federalist	At-large	Elected to finish Edmond's term. Resigned.
Chauncey Goodrich	March 4, 1795 – March 4, 1801	Federalist	At-large	Elected in 1794. Lost re-election to seven others. (Note: Dana, Griswold, J. C. Smith, Goodrich, Davenport, and Perkins.)
Elizur Goodrich	March 4, 1799 – March 3, 1801	Federalist	At-large	Elected in 1798. Re-elected in 1800 but declined to serve.
Edward W. Goss	November 4, 1930 – January 3, 1935	Republican	5th	Elected to finish Glynn's term. Lost re-election to J. J. Smith
Bernard F. Grabowski	January 3, 1963 – January 3, 1965	Democratic	At-large	Elected in 1962. Redistricted to the 6th district.
Bernard F. Grabowski	January 3, 1965 – January 3, 1967	Democratic	6th	Redistricted from the at-large district and re-elected in 1964. Lost re-election to Meskill.
Miles T. Granger	March 4, 1887 – March 4, 1889	Democratic	4th	Elected in 1886. Retired.
Ella T. Grasso	January 3, 1971 – January 3, 1975	Democratic	6th	Elected in 1970. Retired to run for governor.
Roger Griswold	March 4, 1795 – ????, 1805	Federalist	At-large	Elected in 1794. Re-elected in 1804 but resigned before the convening of the 9th Congress.
Elisha Haley	March 4, 1835 – March 4, 1837	Jacksonian	At-large	Elected in 1835. Redistricted to the 3rd district and changed parties.
Elisha Haley	March 4, 1837 – March 4, 1839	Democratic	3rd	Redistricted from the at-large district and Re-elected in 1837 as a Democrat. Retired.
Joseph R. Hawley	December 2, 1872 – March 4, 1875	Republican	1st	Elected to finish Strong's term. Lost re-election to Landers.
Joseph R. Hawley	March 4, 1879 – March 4, 1881	Republican	1st	Elected in 1878. Retired to run for U.S. Senator.
Jahana Hayes	January 3, 2019 – present	Democratic	5th	Elected in 2018. Incumbent.
E. Stevens Henry	March 4, 1895 – March 4, 1913	Republican	1st	Elected in 1894. Retired.
Edwin W. Higgins	October 2, 1905 – March 4, 1913	Republican	3rd	Elected to finish Brandegee's term. Retired.
William L. Higgins	March 4, 1933 – January 3, 1937	Republican	2nd	Elected in 1932. Lost re-election to Fitzgerald.
Ebenezer J. Hill	March 4, 1895 – March 4, 1913	Republican	4th	Elected in 1894. Lost re-election to Donovan.
Ebenezer J. Hill	March 4, 1915 – September 27, 1917	Republican	4th	Elected in 1914. Died.
James Hillhouse	March 4, 1791 – March 4, 1795	Pro-Administration	At-large	Elected in 1790. Changed parties.
James Hillhouse	March 4, 1795 – December 5, 1796	Federalist	At-large	Re-elected in 1794 as a Federalist. Retired to run for U.S. Senator and resigned when elected.
Jim Himes	January 3, 2009 – present	Democratic	4th	Elected in 2008. Incumbent.
Uriel Holmes	March 4, 1817 – ????, 1818	Federalist	At-large	Elected in 1816. Resigned.
Orrin Holt	December 5, 1836 – March 4, 1837	Jacksonian	At-large	Elected to finish Judson's term. Redistricted to the 6th district and changed parties.
Orrin Holt	March 4, 1837 – March 4, 1839	Democratic	6th	Redistricted from the at-large district re-elected in 1837 as a Democrat. Retired.
Julius Hotchkiss	March 4, 1867 – March 4, 1869	Democratic	2nd	Elected in 1867. Retired.
John H. Hubbard	March 4, 1863 – March 4, 1867	Republican	4th	Elected in 1863. Lost renomination to P. T. Barnum.
Richard D. Hubbard	March 4, 1867 – March 4, 1869	Democratic	1st	Elected in 1867. Retired.
Samuel D. Hubbard	March 4, 1845 – March 4, 1849	Democratic	2nd	Elected in 1845. Lost re-election to Booth.
Benjamin Huntington	March 4, 1789 – March 4, 1791	Pro-Administration	At-large	Elected in 1788. Lost re-election to five others. (Note: Sherman, Edwards, Hillhouse, Sturges, and Trumbull Jr.)
Ebenezer Huntington	October 11, 1810 – March 4, 1811	Federalist	At-large	Elected to finish Dana's term. Lost re-election to seven others. (Note: Sturges, Moseley, Tallmadge, Champion, Pitkin, Law, and Davenport.)
Ebenezer Huntington	March 4, 1817 – March 4, 1819	Federalist	At-large	Elected in 1816. Retired.
Colin M. Ingersoll	March 4, 1851 – March 4, 1855	Democratic	2nd	Elected in 1851. Retired.
Ralph I. Ingersoll	March 4, 1825 – March 4, 1833	Anti-Jacksonian	At-large	Elected in 1825. Retired.
Samuel Ingham	March 4, 1835 – March 4, 1837	Jacksonian	At-large	Elected in 1835. Redistricted to the 2nd district and changed parties.
Samuel Ingham	March 4, 1837 – March 4, 1839	Democratic	2nd	Redistricted from the at-large district and re-elected in 1837 as a Democrat. Lost re-election to Storrs.
Donald J. Irwin	January 3, 1959 – January 3, 1961	Democratic	4th	Elected in 1958. Lost re-election to Sibal.
Donald J. Irwin	January 3, 1965 – January 3, 1969	Democratic	4th	Elected in 1964. Lost re-election to Weicker.
Ebenezer Jackson Jr.	December 1, 1834 – March 4, 1835	Anti-Jacksonian	At-large	Elected to finish Foot's term. Lost re-election to six others.
Nancy Johnson	January 3, 1983 – January 3, 2003	Republican	6th	Elected in 1982. Redistricted to the 5th district.
Nancy Johnson	January 3, 2003 – January 3, 2007	Republican	5th	Redistricted from the 6th district and re-elected in 2002. Lost re-election to Murphy.
Andrew T. Judson	March 4, 1835 – July 4, 1836	Jacksonian	At-large	Elected in 1835. Resigned after being appointed to the U.S. District Court for the District of Connecticut.
Stephen W. Kellogg	March 4, 1869 – March 4, 1875	Republican	2nd	Elected in 1869. Lost re-election to Phelps.
William Kennedy	March 4, 1913 – March 4, 1915	Democratic	5th	Elected in 1912. Lost re-election to Glynn.
Barbara B. Kennelly	January 12, 1982 – January 3, 1999	Democratic	1st	Elected to finish Cotter's term. Retired to run for governor.
Herman P. Kopplemann	March 4, 1933 – January 3, 1939	Democratic	1st	Elected in 1932. Lost re-election to Miller.
Herman P. Kopplemann	January 3, 1941 – January 3, 1943	Democratic	1st	Elected in 1940. Lost re-election to Miller.
Herman P. Kopplemann	January 3, 1945 – January 3, 1947	Democratic	1st	Elected in 1944. Lost re-election to Miller.
Frank Kowalski	January 3, 1959 – January 3, 1963	Democratic	At-large	Elected in 1958. Retired to run for U.S. Senator.
George M. Landers	March 4, 1875 – March 4, 1879	Democratic	1st	Elected in 1875. Lost re-election to Hawley.
John B. Larson	January 3, 1999 – present	Democratic	1st	Elected in 1998. Incumbent.
Lyman Law	March 4, 1811 – March 4, 1817	Federalist	At-large	Elected in 1810. Lost re-election to seven others.
Amasa Learned	March 4, 1791 – March 4, 1795	Pro-Administration	At-large	Elected in 1790. Retired.
George L. Lilley	March 4, 1903 – January 5, 1909	Republican	At-large	Elected in 1902. Retired to run for governor and resigned to take office.
John Lodge	January 3, 1947 – January 3, 1951	Republican	4th	Elected in 1946. Retired to run for governor.
Augustine Lonergan	March 4, 1913 – March 4, 1915	Democratic	1st	Elected in 1912. Lost re-election to Oakey.
Augustine Lonergan	March 4, 1917 – March 4, 1921	Democratic	1st	Elected in 1916. Retired to run for U.S. Senator.
Augustine Lonergan	March 4, 1931 – March 4, 1933	Democratic	1st	Elected in 1930. Retired to run for U.S. Senator.
Dwight Loomis	March 4, 1859 – March 4, 1863	Republican	1st	Elected in 1859. Retired.
Clare Boothe Luce	January 3, 1943 – January 3, 1947	Republican	4th	Elected in 1942. Retired.
Lucien J. Maciora	January 3, 1941 – January 3, 1943	Democratic	At-large	Elected in 1940. Lost re-election to Monkiewicz.
Bryan F. Mahan	March 4, 1913 – March 4, 1915	Democratic	2nd	Elected in 1912. Lost re-election to Freeman.
Francis T. Maloney	March 4, 1933 – January 3, 1935	Democratic	3rd	Elected in 1932. Retired to run for U.S. Senator.
James H. Maloney	January 3, 1997 – January 3, 2003	Democratic	5th	Elected in 1996. Lost re-election to Johnson.
Edwin H. May Jr.	January 3, 1957 – January 3, 1959	Republican	1st	Elected in 1956. lost re-election to Daddario.
John A. McGuire	January 3, 1949 – January 3, 1953	Democratic	3rd	Elected in 1948. Lost re-election to Cretella.
Stewart McKinney	January 3, 1971 – May 7, 1987	Republican	4th	Elected in 1970. Died.
John D. McWilliams	January 3, 1943 – January 3, 1945	Republican	2nd	Elected in 1942. lost re-election to Woodhouse.
Schuyler Merritt	November 6, 1917 – March 4, 1931	Republican	4th	Elected to finish Hill's term. Lost re-election to Tierney.
Schuyler Merritt	March 4, 1933 – January 3, 1937	Republican	4th	Elected in 1932. Lost re-election to Phillips.
Orange Merwin	March 4, 1825 – March 4, 1829	Anti-Jacksonian	At-large	Elected in 1825. Lost re-election to six others. (Note: Ingersoll, Barber, Young, Huntington, Storrs, and Ellsworth).
Thomas Meskill	January 3, 1967 – January 3, 1971	Republican	6th	Elected in 1966. Retired to run for governor.
Frederick Miles	March 4, 1879 – March 4, 1883	Republican	4th	Elected in 1878. Retired.
Frederick Miles	March 4, 1889 – March 4, 1891	Republican	4th	Elected in 1888. Lost re-election to De Forest.
William J. Miller	January 3, 1939 – March 4, 1941	Republican	1st	Elected in 1938. Lost re-election to Kopplemann.
William J. Miller	January 3, 1943 – January 3, 1945	Republican	1st	Elected in 1942. Lost re-election to Kopplemann.
William J. Miller	January 3, 1947 – January 3, 1949	Republican	1st	Elected in 1946. Lost re-election to Ribicoff.
Phineas Miner	December 1, 1834 – March 4, 1835	Anti-Jacksonian	At-large	Elected to finish Huntington's term. Retired.
Charles L. Mitchell	March 4, 1883 – March 4, 1887	Democratic	2nd	Elected in 1882. Retired.
Toby Moffett	January 3, 1975 – January 3, 1983	Democratic	6th	Elected in 1974. Retired to run for U.S. Senator.
John S. Monagan	January 3, 1959 – January 3, 1973	Democratic	5th	Elected in 1958. Lost re-election to Sarasin.
B. J. Monkiewicz	January 3, 1939 – January 3, 1941	Republican	At-large	Elected in 1938. Lost re-election to Maciora.
B. J. Monkiewicz	January 3, 1943 – January 3, 1945	Republican	At-large	Elected in 1942. Lost re-election to Ryter.
Albert P. Morano	January 3, 1951 – January 3, 1959	Republican	4th	Elected in 1950. Lost re-election to Irwin.
Bruce Morrison	January 3, 1983 – January 3, 1991	Democratic	3rd	Elected in 1982. Retired to run for governor.
Jonathan O. Moseley	March 4, 1805 – March 4, 1821	Federalist	At-large	Elected in 1804. Retired.
Chris Murphy	January 3, 2007 – January 3, 2013	Democratic	5th	Elected in 2006. Retired to run for U.S. Senator.
Patrick B. O'Sullivan	March 4, 1923 – March 4, 1925	Democratic	5th	Elected in 1922. Lost re-election to Glynn.
P. Davis Oakey	March 4, 1915 – March 4, 1917	Republican	1st	Elected in 1914. Lost re-election to Lonergan.
Thomas Burr Osborne	March 4, 1839 – March 4, 1843	Whig	4th	Elected in 1839. Lost re-election to Simons.
James T. Patterson	January 3, 1947 – January 3, 1959	Republican	5th	Elected in 1946. Lost re-election to Monagan.
Elias Perkins	March 4, 1801 – March 4, 1803	Federalist	At-large	Elected in 1800. Re-elected in 1802 but declined to serve.
Elisha Phelps	March 4, 1819 – March 4, 1821	Democratic-Republican	At-large	Elected in 1818. Retired.
Elisha Phelps	March 4, 1825 – March 4, 1829	Anti-Jacksonian	At-large	Elected in 1825. Lost re-election to six others.
James Phelps	March 4, 1875 – March 4, 1883	Democratic	2nd	Elected in 1875. Retired.
Lancelot Phelps	March 4, 1835 – March 4, 1837	Jacksonian	At-large	Elected in 1835. Redistricted to the 5th district and changed parties.
Lancelot Phelps	March 4, 1837 – March 4, 1839	Democratic	5th	Redistricted from the at-large district re-elected in 1837 as a Democrat. Retired.
Alfred N. Phillips	January 3, 1937 – January 3, 1939	Democratic	4th	Elected in 1936. Lost re-election to Austin.
James P. Pigott	March 4, 1893 – March 4, 1895	Democratic	2nd	Elected in 1892. Lost re-election to N. Sperry.
Timothy Pitkin	September 16, 1805 – March 4, 1819	Federalist	At-large	Elected to finish Goddard's term. Retired.
David Plant	March 4, 1827 – March 4, 1829	Anti-Jacksonian	At-large	Elected in 1827. Lost re-election to six others.
James T. Pratt	March 4, 1853 – March 4, 1855	Democratic	1st	Elected in 1853. Lost re-election to Clark Jr.
William R. Ratchford	January 3, 1979 – January 3, 1985	Democratic	5th	Elected in 1978. Lost re-election to Rowland.
Thomas L. Reilly	March 4, 1911 – March 4, 1913	Democratic	2nd	Elected in 1910. Redistricted to the 3rd district.
Thomas L. Reilly	March 4, 1913 – March 4, 1915	Democratic	3rd	Redistricted from the 2nd district and re-elected in 1912. Lost re-election to Tilson.
Abraham A. Ribicoff	January 3, 1949 – January 3, 1953	Democratic	1st	Elected in 1948. Retired to run for U.S. Senator.
John A. Rockwell	March 4, 1845 – March 4, 1849	Whig	3rd	Elected in 1845. Lost re-election to Cleveland.
John G. Rowland	January 3, 1985 – January 3, 1991	Republican	5th	Elected in 1984. Retired to run for governor.
John Russ	March 4, 1819 – March 4, 1823	Democratic-Republican	At-large	Elected in 1818. Lost re-election to six others.
Charles A. Russell	March 4, 1887 – October 23, 1902	Republican	3rd	Elected in 1886. Died.
Joseph F. Ryter	January 3, 1945 – January 3, 1947	Democratic	At-large	Elected in 1944. Lost re-election to Sadlak.
Antoni Sadlak	January 3, 1947 – January 3, 1959	Republican	At-large	Elected in 1946. Lost re-election to Kowalski.
Ronald A. Sarasin	January 3, 1973 – January 3, 1979	Republican	5th	Elected in 1972. Retired to run for governor.
Horace Seely-Brown Jr.	January 3, 1947 – January 3, 1949	Republican	2nd	Elected in 1946. Lost re-election to Woodhouse
Horace Seely-Brown Jr.	January 3, 1961 – January 3, 1963	Republican	2nd	Elected in 1960. Retired to run for U.S. Senator.
Edward W. Seymour	March 4, 1883 – March 4, 1887	Democratic	4th	Elected in 1882. Retired.
Origen S. Seymour	March 4, 1851 – March 4, 1855	Democratic	4th	Elected in 1851. Retired.
Thomas H. Seymour	March 4, 1843 – March 4, 1845	Democratic	1st	Elected in 1843. Lost re-election to Dixon.
James A. Shanley	January 3, 1935 – January 3, 1943	Democratic	3rd	Elected in 1934. Lost re-election to Compton.
Chris Shays	August 18, 1987 – January 3, 2009	Republican	4th	Elected to finish McKinney's term. Lost re-election to Himes.
Roger Sherman	March 4, 1789 – March 4, 1791	Pro-Administration	At-large	Elected in 1788. Re-elected in 1790 but declined to serve.
Samuel B. Sherwood	March 4, 1817 – March 4, 1819	Federalist	At-large	Elected in 1816. Retired.
Abner W. Sibal	January 3, 1961 – January 3, 1965	Republican	4th	Elected in 1960. Lost re-election to Irwin.
Rob Simmons	January 3, 2001 – January 3, 2007	Republican	2nd	Elected in 2000. Lost re-election to Courtney.
William E. Simonds	March 4, 1889 – March 4, 1891	Republican	1st	Elected in 1888. Lost re-election to L. Sperry.
Samuel Simons	March 4, 1843 – March 4, 1845	Democratic	4th	Elected in 1843. Retired.
John Cotton Smith	November 17, 1800 – August ??, 1806	Federalist	At-large	Elected to finish Brace's term. Resigned.
J. Joseph Smith	January 3, 1935 – November 4, 1941	Democratic	5th	Elected in 1934. Resigned after being appointed to the U.S. District Court for the District of Connecticut.
Nathaniel Smith	March 4, 1795 – March 4, 1799	Federalist	At-large	Elected in 1794. Lost re-election to seven others. (Note: Allen, Goodrich, Dana, Edmond, Griswold, Brace, and Davenport.)
Truman Smith	March 4, 1839 – March 4, 1843	Whig	5th	Elected in 1839. Retired.
Truman Smith	March 4, 1845 – March 4, 1849	Whig	4th	Elected in 1845. Retired to run for U.S. Senator.
Lewis Sperry	March 4, 1891 – March 4, 1895	Democratic	1st	Elected in 1890. Lost re-election to Henry.
Nehemiah D. Sperry	March 4, 1895 – March 4, 1911	Republican	2nd	Elected in 1894. Lost re-election to Reilly.
William St. Onge	January 3, 1963 – May 1, 1970	Democratic	2nd	Elected in 1962. Died.
Henry H. Starkweather	March 4, 1867 – January 28, 1876	Republican	3rd	Elected in 1867. Died.
Robert H. Steele	November 3, 1970 – January 3, 1975	Republican	2nd	Elected to finish St. Onge's term. Retired to run for governor.
Ansel Sterling	March 4, 1821 – March 4, 1825	Democratic-Republican	At-large	Elected in 1821. Retired.
James Stevens	March 4, 1819 – March 4, 1821	Democratic-Republican	At-large	Elected in 1818. Retired.
John Stewart	March 4, 1843 – March 4, 1845	Democratic	2nd	Elected in 1843. Lost re-election to Hubbard.
Ebenezer Stoddard	March 4, 1821 – March 4, 1825	Democratic-Republican	At-large	Elected in 1821. Retired.
William L. Storrs	March 4, 1829 – March 4, 1833	Anti-Jacksonian	At-large	Elected in 1829. Retired.
William L. Storrs	March 4, 1839 – June, 1840	Whig	2nd	Elected in 1839. Resigned after being appointed to the Connecticut Supreme Court.
Julius L. Strong	March 4, 1869 – September 7, 1872	Republican	1st	Elected in 1869. Died.
Jonathan Sturges	March 4, 1789 – March 4, 1793	Pro-Administration	At-large	Elected in 1788. Re-elected in 1792 but declined to serve.
Lewis B. Sturges	September 16, 1805 – March 4, 1817	Federalist	At-large	Elected to finish Griswold's term. Lost re-election to seven others.
Zephaniah Swift	March 4, 1793 – March 4, 1795	Pro-Administration	At-large	Elected in 1792. Changed parties.
Zephaniah Swift	March 4, 1795 – March 4, 1797	Federalist	At-large	Re-elected in 1794 as a Federalist. Re-elected in 1796 but declined to serve.
Joseph E. Talbot	January 20, 1942 – January 3, 1947	Republican	5th	Elected to finish J. J. Smith's term. Retired to run for governor.
Benjamin Tallmadge	March 4, 1801 – March 4, 1817	Federalist	At-large	Elected in 1800. Retired.
Nathaniel Terry	March 4, 1817 – March 4, 1819	Federalist	At-large	Elected in 1816. Retired.
William L. Tierney	March 4, 1931 – March 4, 1933	Democratic	4th	Elected in 1930. Lost re-election to Merritt.
John Q. Tilson	March 4, 1909 – March 4, 1913	Republican	At-large	Elected in 1908. Redistricted to the 3rd district and lost re-election to Reilly.
John Q. Tilson	March 4, 1915 – December 3, 1932	Republican	3rd	Elected in 1914. Retired and resigned early.
Gideon Tomlinson	March 4, 1819 – March 4, 1825	Democratic-Republican	At-large	Elected in 1818. Changed parties.
Gideon Tomlinson	March 4, 1825 – March 4, 1827	Anti-Jacksonian	At-large	Re-elected in 1825 as an Anti-Jacksonian. Lost re-election to six others. (Note: Ingersoll, Phelps, Plant, Merwin, Baldwin, and Barber.)
Isaac Toucey	March 4, 1835 – March 4, 1837	Jacksonian	At-large	Elected in 1835. Redistricted to the 1st district and changed parties.
Isaac Toucey	March 4, 1837 – March 4, 1839	Democratic	1st	Redistricted from the at-large district and re-elected in 1837 as a Democrat. Lost re-election to Trumbull.
Uriah Tracy	March 4, 1793 – March 4, 1795	Pro-Administration	At-large	Elected in 1792. Changed parties.
Uriah Tracy	March 4, 1795 – October 13, 1796	Federalist	At-large	Re-elected in 1794 as a Federalist. Resigned after being elected U.S. Senator.
Jonathan Trumbull Jr.	March 4, 1789 – March 4, 1795	Pro-Administration	At-large	Elected in 1788. Retired to run for U.S. Senator.
Joseph Trumbull	December 1, 1834 – March 4, 1835	Anti-Jacksonian	At-large	Elected to finish Ellsworth's term. Lost re-election to six others.
Joseph Trumbull	March 4, 1839 – March 4, 1843	Whig	1st	Elected in 1839. Retired.
Samuel Tweedy	March 4, 1833 – March 4, 1835	Anti-Jacksonian	At-large	Elected in 1833. Lost re-election to six others.
Robert J. Vance	March 4, 1887 – March 4, 1889	Democratic	1st	Elected in 1886. Lost re-election to Simonds.
Jeremiah Wadsworth	March 4, 1789 – March 4, 1795	Pro-Administration	At-large	Elected in 1788. Retired.
John T. Wait	April 12, 1876 – March 4, 1887	Republican	3rd	Elected to finish Starkweather's term. Retired.
Loren P. Waldo	March 4, 1849 – March 4, 1851	Democratic	1st	Elected in 1849. Lost re-election to Chapman.
Levi Warner	December 4, 1876 – March 4, 1879	Democratic	4th	Elected to finish Barnum's term. Retired.
Samuel L. Warner	March 4, 1865 – March 4, 1867	Republican	2nd	Elected in 1865. Retired.
Lowell P. Weicker Jr.	January 3, 1969 – January 3, 1971	Republican	4th	Elected in 1968. Retired to run for U.S. Senator.
Lemuel Whitman	March 4, 1823 – March 4, 1825	Democratic-Republican	At-large	Elected in 1823. Retired.
Thomas T. Whittlesey	April 29, 1836 – March 4, 1837	Jacksonian	At-large	Elected to finish Wildman's term. Redistricted to the 4th district and changed parties.
Thomas T. Whittlesey	March 4, 1837 – March 4, 1839	Democratic	4th	Redistricted from the at-large district and re-elected in 1837 as a Democrat. Lost re-election to Osborne.
Zalmon Wildman	March 4, 1835 – December 10, 1835	Jacksonian	At-large	Elected in 1835. Died.
Washington F. Willcox	March 4, 1889 – March 4, 1893	Democratic	2nd	Elected in 1888. Retired.
Thomas Scott Williams	March 4, 1817 – March 4, 1819	Federalist	At-large	Elected in 1816. Retired.
Thomas W. Williams	March 4, 1839 – March 4, 1843	Whig	3rd	Elected in 1839. Retired.
Chase G. Woodhouse	January 3, 1945 – January 3, 1947	Democratic	2nd	Elected in 1944. Lost re-election to Seely-Brown Jr.
Chase G. Woodhouse	January 3, 1949 – January 3, 1951	Democratic	2nd	Elected in 1948. Lost re-election to Seely-Brown Jr.
George C. Woodruff	March 4, 1861 – March 4, 1863	Democratic	4th	Elected in 1861. Lost re-election to Hubbard.
John Woodruff	March 4, 1855 – March 4, 1857	Know Nothing	2nd	Elected in 1855. Lost re-election to Arnold.
John Woodruff	March 4, 1859 – March 4, 1861	Republican	2nd	Elected in 1859. Lost re-election to English.
Ebenezer Young	March 4, 1829 – March 4, 1835	Anti-Jacksonian	At-large	Elected in 1829. Lost re-election to six others.

== See also ==
- Connecticut's congressional delegations
- Connecticut's congressional districts
- List of United States senators from Connecticut
