= Connecticut's 3rd congressional district =

U.S. House district for Connecticut

Coordinates: 41°23′07″N 72°52′39″W

- Interactive map of district boundaries since January 3, 2023
- Representative: Rosa DeLauro; D–New Haven
- Area: 485 mi^{2} (1,260 km^{2})
- Distribution: 96.7% urban; 3.3% rural
- Population (2025): 746,188
- Median household income: $95,785
- Ethnicity: 60.7% White; 16.8% Hispanic; 13.4% Black; 4.7% Asian; 3.5% Two or more races; 0.8% other
- Cook PVI: D+8

Connecticut's 3rd congressional district is a congressional district in the U.S. state of Connecticut. Located in the central part of the state, the district includes the city of New Haven and its surrounding suburbs.

Principal cities include: Middletown, New Haven, and Stratford.

The district is currently represented by Democrat Rosa DeLauro.

== History ==
The 3rd congressional district has existed since 1837, having been organized from the at-large congressional district. It is centered on New Haven and its suburbs. The district comprises four-fifths of New Haven County, a small portion of Middlesex County, including most of Middletown, and most of Stratford and a small section of Shelton in Fairfield County.

New Haven and its surrounding suburbs are largely Democratic, making the district very Democratic in local and federal elections. Among districts statewide, only the 1st congressional district is considered more Democratic. Four Democratic strongholds, New Haven, Hamden, Middletown, and West Haven, comprise 40% of the total district population. Since 2000, Democratic presidential candidates have carried the district by a margin of 26 points. John Kerry, being the exception, still defeated George W. Bush by a comfortable 14 points. On the state level, moderate Republicans John G. Rowland and M. Jodi Rell have also carried the district.

Since 1933, Democrats have held the district for all but six terms (1943–45, 1947–49, 1953–59, 1981–83). Between 1972-1988, every Republican nominee for President carried the district, along with the state itself. In his sole run for a House seat, Joe Lieberman, lost the district to a Republican in 1980.

== Composition ==
For the 118th and successive Congresses (based on redistricting following the 2020 census), Connecticut's 3rd district contains portions of four planning regions and 25 municipalities.

Greater Bridgeport Planning Region (1)

Stratford

Lower Connecticut River Valley Planning Region (3)

Durham, Middlefield, Middletown (part; also 1st)

Naugatuck Valley Planning Region (8)

Ansonia, Beacon Falls, Derby, Naugatuck, Prospect, Seymour, Shelton (part; also 4th), Waterbury (part; also 5th)

South Central Connecticut Planning Region (13)

Bethany, Branford, East Haven, Guilford, Hamden, Milford, North Branford, New Haven, North Haven, Orange, Wallingford, West Haven, Woodbridge

=== Voter registration ===
Voter registration and party enrollment as of October 30, 2012
Party	Active Voters	Inactive Voters	Total Voters	Percentage
Democratic	145,529	10,801	156,330	37.50%
Republican	65,324	3,352	68,676	16.47%
Minor Parties	873	120	993	0.24%
Unaffiliated	178,593	12,340	190,933	45.80%
Total	390,319	26,613	416,932	100%

== Recent election results from statewide races ==
Year	Office	Results
2008	President	Obama 62% - 37%
2010	Senate	Blumenthal 60% - 39%
2010	Governor	Malloy 54% - 45%
2012	President	Obama 63% - 37%
2012	Senate	Murphy 60% - 40%
2014	Governor	Malloy 55% - 43%
2016	President	Clinton 55% - 41%
2016	Senate	Blumenthal 67% - 31%
2018	Senate	Murphy 61% - 38%
2018	Governor	Lamont 51% - 46%
2018	Attorney General	Tong 54% - 45%
2020	President	Biden 59% - 39%
2022	Senate	Blumenthal 58% - 42%
2022	Governor	Lamont 56% - 43%
2022	Secretary of the State	Thomas 56% - 42%
2022	Treasurer	Russell 54% - 44%
2022	Comptroller	Scanlon 57% - 43%
2022	Attorney General	Tong 58% - 40%
2024	President	Harris 56% - 42%
2024	Senate	Murphy 59% - 39%

== Recent elections ==
=== 1990 ===
US House election, 1990: Connecticut District 3
Party	Candidate	Votes	%	±%
Democratic	Rosa DeLauro	90,772	52%	
Republican	Tom Scott	83,440	48%	
Democratic hold		Swing		
Turnout		174,212	100%	

=== 1992 ===
US House election, 1992: Connecticut District 3
Party	Candidate	Votes	%	±%
Democratic	Rosa DeLauro (inc.)	162,568	66%	
Republican	Tom Scott	84,952	34%	
Democratic hold		Swing		
Turnout		247,520	100%	

=== 1994 ===
US House election, 1994: Connecticut District 3
Party	Candidate	Votes	%	±%
Democratic	Rosa DeLauro (inc.)	111,261	63%	
Republican	Susan Johnson	64,094	37%	
Democratic hold		Swing		
Turnout		175,355	100%	

=== 1996 ===
US House election, 1996: Connecticut District 3
Party	Candidate	Votes	%	±%
Democratic	Rosa DeLauro (inc.)	150,798	71%	
Republican	John Coppola	59,335	28%	
Natural Law	Gail Dalby	1,219	1%	+
Democratic hold		Swing		
Turnout		211,352	100%	

=== 1998 ===
US House election, 1998: Connecticut District 3
Party	Candidate	Votes	%	±%
Democratic	Rosa DeLauro (inc.)	109,726	71%	
Republican	Martin Reust	42,090	27%	
Term Limits	Kristen Abbatiello	739	1%	
Reform	David Cole	676	1%	
Natural Law	Gail Dalby	620	0.40	−
Democratic hold		Swing		
Turnout		153,851	100%	

=== 2000 ===
US House election, 2000: Connecticut District 3
Party	Candidate	Votes	%	±%
Democratic	Rosa DeLauro (inc.)	156,910	72%	
Republican	June Gold	60,037	28%	
Natural Law	Gail Dalby	1,258	0.58	
Democratic hold		Swing		
Turnout		218,205	100%	

=== 2002 ===
US House election, 2002: Connecticut District 3
Party	Candidate	Votes	%	±%
Democratic	Rosa DeLauro (inc.)	121,557	66%	
Republican	Richard Elser	54,757	30%	
Green	Charles Pillsbury	9,050	4%	
Democratic hold		Swing		
Turnout		185,364	100%	

=== 2004 ===
US House election, 2004: Connecticut District 3
Party	Candidate	Votes	%	±%
Democratic	Rosa DeLauro (inc.)	200,638	72%	
Republican	Richard Elser	69,160	25%	
Green	Ralph Ferrucci	7,182	3%	
Democratic hold		Swing		
Turnout		276,980	100%	

=== 2006 ===
Connecticut 3rd Congressional District Election, 2006
Party	Candidate	Votes	%	±%
Democratic	Rosa DeLauro (inc.)	150,436	76%	
Republican	Joseph Vollano	44,386	22%	
Green	Daniel Sumrall	3,089	2%	
Democratic hold		Swing		
Turnout		197,911		

=== 2008 ===
Connecticut 3rd Congressional District Election, 2008
Party	Candidate	Votes	%	±%
Democratic	Rosa DeLauro (inc.)	228,022	77%	
Republican	Bo Itshaky	58,589	20%	
Green	Ralph Ferrucci	8,598	3%	
Democratic hold		Swing		
Turnout		295,159	100%	

=== 2010 ===
Connecticut 3rd Congressional District Election, 2010
Party	Candidate	Votes	%	±%
Democratic	Rosa DeLauro (inc.)	143,565	65%	
Republican	Jerry Labriola Jr.	74,107	34%	
Green	Charles Pillsbury	2,984	1%	
Independent	Bo Itshaky (Write-In)	5	0%	
Democratic hold		Swing	-13.12	
Turnout		220,661	100%	

=== 2012 ===
Connecticut 3rd Congressional District Election, 2012
Party	Candidate	Votes	%	±%
Democratic	Rosa DeLauro (inc.)	217,573	75%	
Republican	Wayne Winsley	73,726	25%	
Democratic hold		Swing		
Turnout		291,299	100%	

=== 2014 ===
Connecticut 3rd Congressional District Election, 2014
Party	Candidate	Votes	%	±%
Democratic	Rosa DeLauro (inc.)	140,485	67%	
Republican	James Brown	69,454	33%	
Democratic hold		Swing		
Turnout		209,939	100%	

=== 2016 ===
Connecticut 3rd Congressional District Election, 2016
Party	Candidate	Votes	%	±%
Democratic	Rosa DeLauro (inc.)	208,900	69%	
Republican	Angel Cadena	95,370	31%	
Democratic hold		Swing		
Turnout		304,270	100%	

=== 2018 ===
Connecticut 3rd Congressional District Election, 2018
Party	Candidate	Votes	%	±%
Democratic	Rosa DeLauro (inc.)	174,572	64%	
Republican	Angel Cadena	95,667	35%	
Democratic hold		Swing		
Turnout		270,239	100%	

=== 2020 ===
Connecticut 3rd Congressional District Election, 2020
Party	Candidate	Votes	%	±%
Democratic	Rosa DeLauro (inc.)	203,265	59%	
Republican	Margaret Streicker	137,596	40%	
Green	Justin Paglino	5,240	1%	
Democratic hold		Swing		
Turnout		346,101	100%	

=== 2022 ===
2022 Connecticut's 3rd congressional district election
Party	Candidate	Votes	%
Democratic	Rosa DeLauro (incumbent)	137,924	56.8
Republican	Lesley DeNardis	98,704	40.7
Independent	Amy Chai	4,056	1.7
Green	Justin Paglino	1,967	0.8
Total votes		242,651	100.0
Democratic hold			

=== 2024 ===
2024 Connecticut's 3rd congressional district election
Party	Candidate	Votes	%
Democratic	Rosa DeLauro (incumbent)	193,684	58.9
Republican	Michael Massey	135,113	41.1
Total votes		328,797	100.0
Democratic hold			

== List of members representing the district ==
Member (Residence)	Party	Years of service	Cong ress	Electoral history	Location
District created March 4, 1837
Elisha Haley (Mystic)	Democratic	March 4, 1837 – March 3, 1839	25th	Redistricted from the at-large district and re-elected in 1837. Retired.	
Thomas Wheeler Williams (New London)	Whig	March 4, 1839 – March 3, 1843	26th 27th	Elected in 1839. Re-elected in 1840. Retired.	
George S. Catlin (Windham)	Democratic	March 4, 1843 – March 3, 1845	28th	Elected in 1843. Retired.	
John A. Rockwell (Norwich)	Whig	March 4, 1845 – March 3, 1849	29th 30th	Elected in 1845. Re-elected in 1847. Lost re-election.	
Chauncey Fitch Cleveland (Hampton)	Democratic	March 4, 1849 – March 3, 1853	31st 32nd	Elected in 1849. Re-elected in 1851. Retired.	
Nathan Belcher (New London)	Democratic	March 4, 1853 – March 3, 1855	33rd	Elected in 1853. Retired.	
Sidney Dean (Putnam)	Know Nothing	March 4, 1855 – March 3, 1857	34th 35th	Elected in 1855. Re-elected in 1857. Retired.	
Sidney Dean (Putnam)	Republican	March 4, 1857 – March 3, 1859	34th 35th	Elected in 1855. Re-elected in 1857. Retired.	
Alfred A. Burnham (Windham)	Republican	March 4, 1859 – March 3, 1863	36th 37th	Elected in 1859. Re-elected in 1861. Retired.	
Augustus Brandegee (New London)	Republican	March 4, 1863 – March 3, 1867	38th 39th	Elected in 1863. Re-elected in 1865.	
Henry H. Starkweather (Norwich)	Republican	March 4, 1867 – January 28, 1876	40th 41st 42nd 43rd 44th	Elected in 1867. Re-elected in 1869. Re-elected in 1871. Re-elected in 1873. Re-elected in 1875. Died.	
Vacant		January 28, 1876 – April 12, 1876	44th		
John T. Wait (Norwich)	Republican	April 12, 1876 – March 3, 1887	44th 45th 46th 47th 48th 49th	Elected to finish Starkweather's term. Re-elected in 1876. Re-elected in 1878. Re-elected in 1880. Re-elected in 1882. Re-elected in 1884. Retired.	
Charles Addison Russell (Killingly)	Republican	March 4, 1887 – October 23, 1902	50th 51st 52nd 53rd 54th 55th 56th 57th	Elected in 1886. Re-elected in 1888. Re-elected in 1890. Re-elected in 1892. Re-elected in 1894. Re-elected in 1896. Re-elected in 1898. Re-elected in 1900. Died.	
Vacant		October 23, 1902 – November 4, 1902	57th		
Frank B. Brandegee (New London)	Republican	November 4, 1902 – May 10, 1905	57th 58th 59th	Elected to finish Russell's term. Re-elected in 1902. Re-elected in 1904. Resigned when elected to the US Senate	
Vacant		May 10, 1905 – October 2, 1905	59th		
Edwin W. Higgins (Norwich)	Republican	October 2, 1905 – March 3, 1913	59th 60th 61st 62nd	Elected to finish Brandegee's term. Re-elected in 1906. Re-elected in 1908. Re-elected in 1910. Retired.	
Thomas L. Reilly (Meriden)	Democratic	March 4, 1913 – March 3, 1915	63rd	Elected in 1912. Lost re-election.	
John Q. Tilson (New Haven)	Republican	March 4, 1915 – December 3, 1932	64th 65th 66th 67th 68th 69th 70th 71st 72nd	Elected in 1914. Re-elected in 1916. Re-elected in 1918. Re-elected in 1920. Re-elected in 1922. Re-elected in 1924. Re-elected in 1926. Re-elected in 1928. Re-elected in 1930. Resigned.	
Vacant		December 3, 1932 – March 3, 1933	72nd		
Francis T. Maloney (Meriden)	Democratic	March 4, 1933 – January 3, 1935	73rd	Elected in 1932. Retired to run for U.S. senator.	
James A. Shanley (New Haven)	Democratic	January 3, 1935 – January 3, 1943	74th 75th 76th 77th	Elected in 1934. Re-elected in 1936. Re-elected in 1938. Re-elected in 1940. Lost re-election.	
Ranulf Compton (Madison)	Republican	January 3, 1943 – January 3, 1945	78th	Elected in 1942. Lost re-election.	
James P. Geelan (New Haven)	Democratic	January 3, 1945 – January 3, 1947	79th	Elected in 1944. Lost re-election.	
Ellsworth Foote (North Branford)	Republican	January 3, 1947 – January 3, 1949	80th	Elected in 1946. Lost re-election.	
John A. McGuire (Wallingford)	Democratic	January 3, 1949 – January 3, 1953	81st 82nd	Elected in 1948. Re-elected in 1950. Lost re-election.	
Albert W. Cretella (North Haven)	Republican	January 3, 1953 – January 3, 1959	83rd 84th 85th	Elected in 1952. Re-elected in 1954. Re-elected in 1956. Lost re-election.	
Robert Giaimo (North Haven)	Democratic	January 3, 1959 – January 3, 1981	86th 87th 88th 89th 90th 91st 92nd 93rd 94th 95th 96th	Elected in 1958. Re-elected in 1960. Re-elected in 1962. Re-elected in 1964. Re-elected in 1966. Re-elected in 1968. Re-elected in 1970. Re-elected in 1972. Re-elected in 1974. Re-elected in 1976. Re-elected in 1978. Retired.	
Lawrence J. DeNardis (Hamden)	Republican	January 3, 1981 – January 3, 1983	97th	Elected in 1980. Lost re-election.	
Bruce Morrison (Hamden)	Democratic	January 3, 1983 – January 3, 1991	98th 99th 100th 101st	Elected in 1982. Re-elected in 1984. Re-elected in 1986. Re-elected in 1988. Retired to run for Governor of Connecticut.	
Rosa DeLauro (New Haven)	Democratic	January 3, 1991 – present	102nd 103rd 104th 105th 106th 107th 108th 109th 110th 111th 112th 113th 114th 115th 116th 117th 118th 119th	Elected in 1990. Re-elected in 1992. Re-elected in 1994. Re-elected in 1996. Re-elected in 1998. Re-elected in 2000. Re-elected in 2002. Re-elected in 2004. Re-elected in 2006. Re-elected in 2008. Re-elected in 2010. Re-elected in 2012. Re-elected in 2014. Re-elected in 2016. Re-elected in 2018. Re-elected in 2020. Re-elected in 2022. Re-elected in 2024. Re-elected in 2026.	
Rosa DeLauro (New Haven)	Democratic	January 3, 1991 – present	102nd 103rd 104th 105th 106th 107th 108th 109th 110th 111th 112th 113th 114th 115th 116th 117th 118th 119th	Elected in 1990. Re-elected in 1992. Re-elected in 1994. Re-elected in 1996. Re-elected in 1998. Re-elected in 2000. Re-elected in 2002. Re-elected in 2004. Re-elected in 2006. Re-elected in 2008. Re-elected in 2010. Re-elected in 2012. Re-elected in 2014. Re-elected in 2016. Re-elected in 2018. Re-elected in 2020. Re-elected in 2022. Re-elected in 2024. Re-elected in 2026.	1993–2003 [data missing]
Rosa DeLauro (New Haven)	Democratic	January 3, 1991 – present	102nd 103rd 104th 105th 106th 107th 108th 109th 110th 111th 112th 113th 114th 115th 116th 117th 118th 119th	Elected in 1990. Re-elected in 1992. Re-elected in 1994. Re-elected in 1996. Re-elected in 1998. Re-elected in 2000. Re-elected in 2002. Re-elected in 2004. Re-elected in 2006. Re-elected in 2008. Re-elected in 2010. Re-elected in 2012. Re-elected in 2014. Re-elected in 2016. Re-elected in 2018. Re-elected in 2020. Re-elected in 2022. Re-elected in 2024. Re-elected in 2026.	2003–2013
Rosa DeLauro (New Haven)	Democratic	January 3, 1991 – present	102nd 103rd 104th 105th 106th 107th 108th 109th 110th 111th 112th 113th 114th 115th 116th 117th 118th 119th	Elected in 1990. Re-elected in 1992. Re-elected in 1994. Re-elected in 1996. Re-elected in 1998. Re-elected in 2000. Re-elected in 2002. Re-elected in 2004. Re-elected in 2006. Re-elected in 2008. Re-elected in 2010. Re-elected in 2012. Re-elected in 2014. Re-elected in 2016. Re-elected in 2018. Re-elected in 2020. Re-elected in 2022. Re-elected in 2024. Re-elected in 2026.	2013–2023
Rosa DeLauro (New Haven)	Democratic	January 3, 1991 – present	102nd 103rd 104th 105th 106th 107th 108th 109th 110th 111th 112th 113th 114th 115th 116th 117th 118th 119th	Elected in 1990. Re-elected in 1992. Re-elected in 1994. Re-elected in 1996. Re-elected in 1998. Re-elected in 2000. Re-elected in 2002. Re-elected in 2004. Re-elected in 2006. Re-elected in 2008. Re-elected in 2010. Re-elected in 2012. Re-elected in 2014. Re-elected in 2016. Re-elected in 2018. Re-elected in 2020. Re-elected in 2022. Re-elected in 2024. Re-elected in 2026.	2023–present
