= Herman P. Kopplemann =

American politician (1880–1957)

- Kopplemann c. 1946

Member of the U.S. House of Representatives from Connecticut's 1st district
- In office January 3, 1945 – January 3, 1947
- Preceded by: William J. Miller
- Succeeded by: William J. Miller
- In office January 3, 1941 – January 3, 1943
- Preceded by: William J. Miller
- Succeeded by: William J. Miller
- In office March 4, 1933 – January 3, 1939
- Preceded by: Augustine Lonergan
- Succeeded by: William J. Miller

Personal details
- Born: May 1, 1880 Odessa, Ukraine
- Died: August 11, 1957 (aged 77) Hartford, Connecticut, U.S.
- Party: Democratic

Herman Paul Kopplemann (May 1, 1880 – August 11, 1957) was a U.S. representative from Connecticut.

== Biography ==
Born in Odessa, Ukraine (then part of the Russian Empire), Kopplemann immigrated to the United States in 1882 with his parents, who settled in Hartford, Connecticut. He attended the grade and high schools. He engaged as publishers' agent for newspapers and magazines in 1894. He served as member of the Hartford city council 1904–1912, serving as president in 1911. He served in the State senate 1917–1920.

Kopplemann was elected as a Democrat to the Seventy-third, Seventy-fourth, and Seventy-fifth Congresses (March 4, 1933 – January 3, 1939). He was an unsuccessful candidate for reelection in 1938 to the Seventy-sixth Congress. Kopplemann was elected to the Seventy-seventh Congress (January 3, 1941 – January 3, 1943). He was an unsuccessful candidate for reelection in 1942 to the Seventy-eighth Congress.

Kopplemann was elected to the Seventy-ninth Congress (January 3, 1945 – January 3, 1947). He was an unsuccessful candidate for reelection in 1946 to the Eightieth Congress. He served as chairman of State Water Commission and Metropolitan District Commission. He died in Hartford on August 11, 1957, and was interred in Emanuel Synagogue Cemetery, Wethersfield, Connecticut.

== See also ==
- List of Jewish members of the United States Congress

U.S. House of Representatives
Preceded by Augustine Lonergan	Member of the U.S. House of Representatives from Connecticut's 1st congressional district 1933 – 1939	Succeeded by William J. Miller
Preceded by William J. Miller	Member of the U.S. House of Representatives from Connecticut's 1st congressional district 1941 – 1943	Succeeded by William J. Miller
Preceded by William J. Miller	Member of the U.S. House of Representatives from Connecticut's 1st congressional district 1945 – 1947	Succeeded by William J. Miller
