= James A. Shanley =

American politician

James Shanley
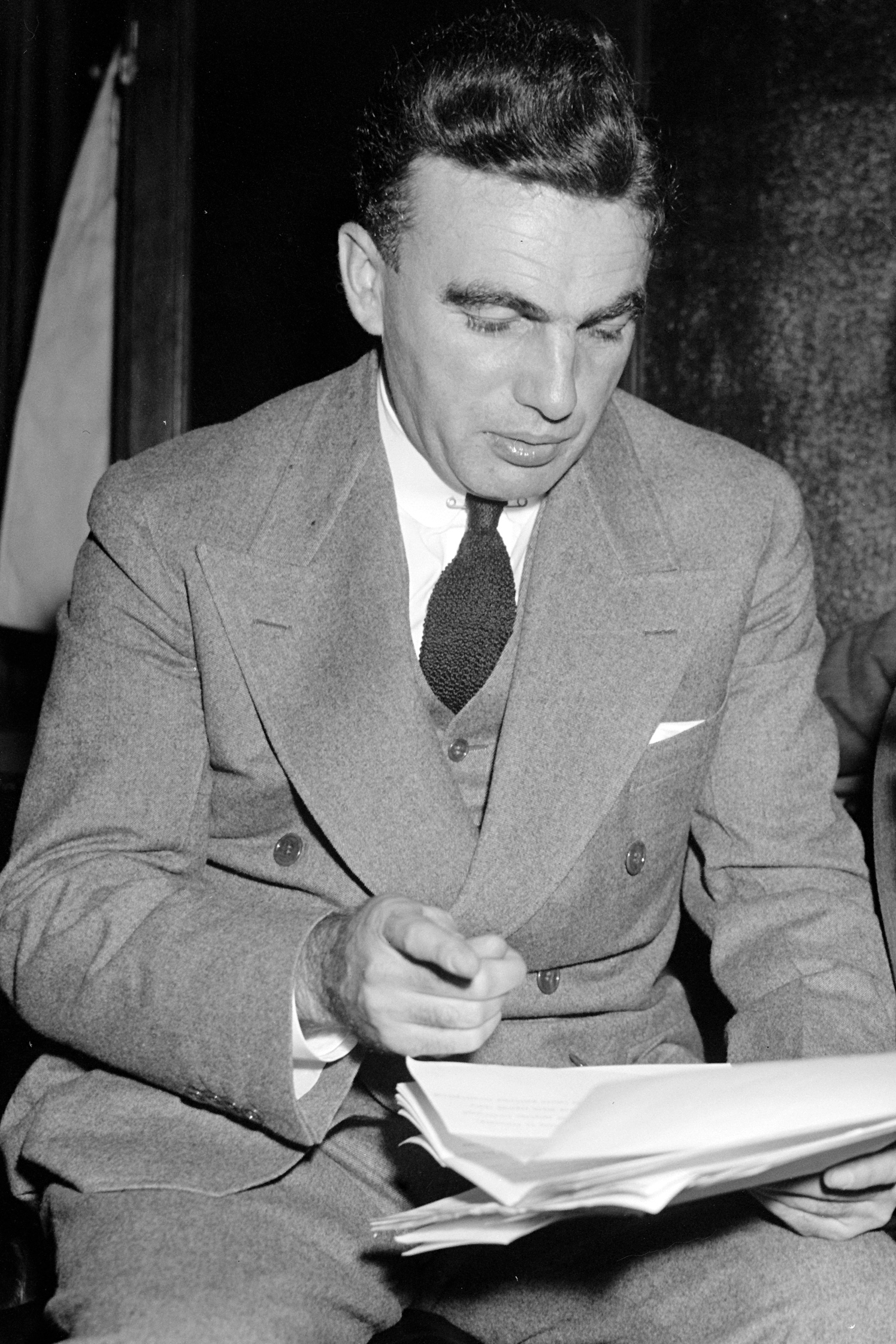

Member of the U.S. House of Representatives from Connecticut's 3rd district
- In office January 3, 1935 – January 3, 1943
- Preceded by: Francis T. Maloney
- Succeeded by: Ranulf Compton

Personal details
- Born: April 1, 1896 New Haven, Connecticut, U.S.
- Died: April 4, 1965 (aged 69) New Haven, Connecticut, U.S
- Party: Democratic
- Education: Yale University

Military service
- Allegiance: United States of America
- Branch/service: United States Army
- Rank: Lieutenant
- Unit: 45th Field Artillery
- Battles/wars: World War I

James Andrew Shanley (April 1, 1896 – April 4, 1965) was a U.S. representative from Connecticut.

Born in New Haven, Connecticut, Shanley attended the public schools. Graduate of Battery Commander School at Fort Sill, Arkansas, in 1917. During the First World War served as a lieutenant in the Forty-fifth Field Artillery, United States Army, in 1917 and 1918. He graduated from Yale University, in 1920. He taught mathematics at Carlton Academy, Summit, New Jersey, in 1920 and 1921 and in New Haven, Connecticut from 1921 to 1934. Educational and athletic adviser of the New Haven Boys Club 1926-1928. He graduated from the law department of Yale University in 1928. He was admitted to the bar in 1928 and commenced practice in New Haven. He served as captain in the Artillery Reserves 1923-1935. He served as adjutant in the Connecticut National Guard 1929-1935. Major on the staff of Gov. Wilbur L. Cross 1931-1935. Lecturer at the Catholic University of America in Washington, D.C. from 1941 to 1945.

Shanley was elected as a Democrat to the Seventy-fourth and to the three succeeding Congresses (January 3, 1935 – January 3, 1943). He was an unsuccessful candidate for reelection in 1942 to the Seventy-eighth Congress. Receiver for the Hartford Empire Co. from 1942 to 1946. He resumed the practice of law.

Shanley was elected November 5, 1949, as judge of probate for the towns of New Haven, East Haven, North Haven, Orange, and Woodbridge, Connecticut, serving until his death in New Haven, Connecticut, April 4, 1965. He was interred in St. Lawrence Cemetery, West Haven, Connecticut.

U.S. House of Representatives
Preceded by Francis T. Maloney	Member of the U.S. House of Representatives from Connecticut's 3rd congressional district 1935-1943	Succeeded by Ranulf Compton
