= Albert W. Cretella =

American politician (1897–1979)

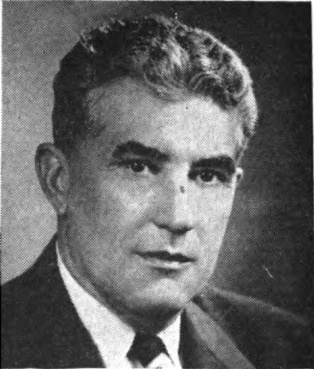
- Cretella, c. 1955

Member of the U.S. House of Representatives from Connecticut's 3rd district
- In office January 3, 1953 – January 3, 1959
- Preceded by: John A. McGuire
- Succeeded by: Robert Giaimo

Member of the Connecticut House of Representatives
- In office 1947-1952

Personal details
- Born: April 22, 1897 New Haven, Connecticut, U.S.
- Died: May 24, 1979 (aged 82) New Haven, Connecticut, U.S.
- Resting place: St. Lawrence Cemetery; West Haven, Connecticut
- Party: Republican
- Education: Yale University

Albert William Cretella (April 22, 1897 – May 24, 1979) was a U.S. representative from Connecticut.

== Early life ==
Born in New Haven, Connecticut, to Italian immigrants, Cretella attended the public schools of New Haven. He graduated from Yale University in 1917. He entered Yale Law School but interrupted studies and enlisted in the United States Navy June 18, 1918, and was in officers training school when the armistice was signed. He reentered Yale Law School and graduated in 1921. He was admitted to the Connecticut bar the same year and began practice in New Haven.

== Political career ==
Cretella moved to North Haven in 1926 and served as prosecuting attorney 1931–1945 and town counsel 1931–1970, excluding the years 1946 and 1947. He served as member of the Connecticut House of Representatives 1947–1952.

Cretella was elected as a Republican to the Eighty-third and to the two succeeding Congresses (January 3, 1953 – January 3, 1959). Cretella voted in favor of the Civil Rights Act of 1957. He was an unsuccessful candidate for reelection in 1958 to the Eighty-sixth Congress and for election in 1960 to the Eighty-seventh Congress, after which he returned to the practice of law. He died in New Haven, Connecticut, May 24, 1979, and was interred in St. Lawrence Cemetery, West Haven, Connecticut.

U.S. House of Representatives
Preceded by John A. McGuire	Member of the U.S. House of Representatives from Connecticut's 3rd congressional district 1953-1959	Succeeded by Robert Giaimo
