= Ellsworth Foote =

American politician (1898–1977)

Member of the U.S. House of Representatives from Connecticut's 3rd district
- In office January 3, 1947 – January 3, 1949
- Preceded by: James P. Geelan
- Succeeded by: John A. McGuire

Personal details
- Born: January 12, 1898 North Branford, Connecticut, U.S.
- Died: January 18, 1977 (aged 79) Guilford, Connecticut, U.S
- Party: Republican
- Education: Yale University; Georgetown University

Ellsworth Bishop Foote (January 12, 1898 – January 18, 1977) was a U.S. representative from Connecticut.

Born in North Branford, Connecticut, January 12, 1898, Foote attended the public schools. He graduated from Yale Business College in 1916 and from Georgetown University Law School, Washington, D.C., in 1923. He was admitted to the bar in 1924 and commenced practice in New Haven, Connecticut.

He served as corporation counsel of North Branford from 1924 to 1946. In 1925-26, he served as special assistant to the Attorney General, at the United States Department of Justice in Washington, D.C. He served as chairman of the board of finance of North Branford from 1934 to 1946.

Foote served as judge of probate in the North Branford District from 1938 to 1946. He was New Haven County Attorney from 1942 to 1946, and again from 1949 to 1960. He served as acting judge of probate in the New Haven Probate Court in 1944-45.

He was elected as a Republican to the Eightieth Congress (January 3, 1947 – January 3, 1949), defeating the one-term incumbent., but was unsuccessful for re-election in 1948. In 1950 he received the Republican nomination again and lost to the Democrat who unseated him in 1948. After his defeat he again served as corporation counsel for the town of North Branford, and resumed the practice of law.

Foote died in Guilford, Connecticut, January 18, 1977. He was interred in Bare Plain Cemetery, North Branford, Connecticut.

His daughter, Roberta (Foote) Koontz, ran unsuccessfully for Congress in 1984.

U.S. House of Representatives
Preceded by James P. Geelan	Member of the U.S. House of Representatives from Connecticut's 3rd congressional district 1947-1949	Succeeded by John A. McGuire
