= James P. Geelan =

American politician (1901–1982)

- Geelan c. 1946

Member of the U.S. House of Representatives from Connecticut's 3rd district
- In office January 3, 1945 – January 3, 1947
- Preceded by: Ranulf Compton
- Succeeded by: Ellsworth Foote

Personal details
- Born: August 11, 1901 New Haven, Connecticut, U.S.
- Died: August 10, 1982 (aged 80) Branford, Connecticut, U.S
- Party: Democratic

James Patrick Geelan (August 11, 1901 – August 10, 1982) was a U.S. representative from Connecticut.

Born in New Haven, Connecticut, Geelan attended the public schools of New Haven, Connecticut, and graduated from St. Anthony's College, San Antonio, Texas, in 1922. He engaged in the retail cigar business 1922–1941. He served as member of the State senate in 1939, 1941, and 1943. He served as assistant clerk of the New Haven City Court 1941–1943. He served as vice president of the New Haven Central Labor Council in 1942. He engaged in the insurance business since 1943.

Geelan was elected as a Democrat to the Seventy-ninth Congress (January 3, 1945 – January 3, 1947). He was an unsuccessful candidate for reelection in 1946 to the Eightieth Congress. He resumed business pursuits until his retirement in 1972. Resident of Branford, Connecticut, until his death in New Haven on August 10, 1982. He was interred at St. Lawrence Cemetery, West Haven, Connecticut.

U.S. House of Representatives
Preceded by Ranulf Compton	Member of the U.S. House of Representatives from Connecticut's 3rd congressional district 1945-1947	Succeeded by Ellsworth Foote
