= John A. McGuire =

American politician (1906–1976)

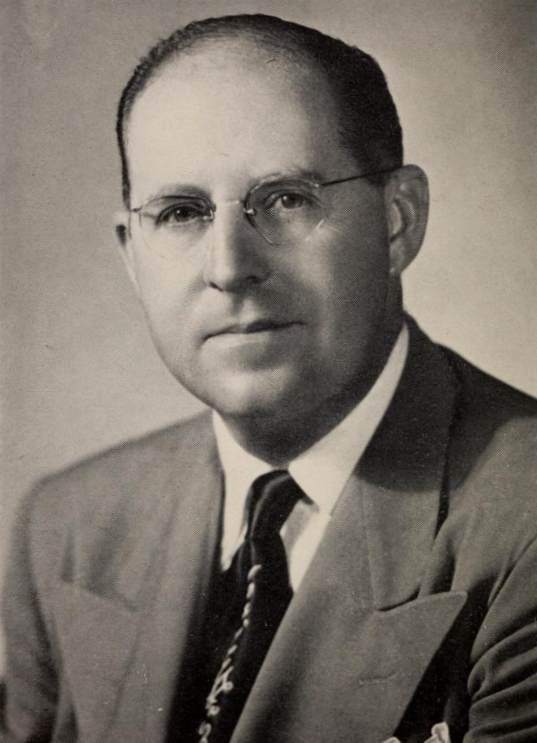

Member of the U.S. House of Representatives from Connecticut's 3rd district
- In office January 3, 1949 – January 3, 1953
- Preceded by: Ellsworth Foote
- Succeeded by: Albert W. Cretella

Chairman of the Democratic Party of Connecticut
- In office January 6, 1946 – September 23, 1946
- Preceded by: Adrian W. Maher
- Succeeded by: John M. Bailey

Personal details
- Born: February 28, 1906 Wallingford, Connecticut, U.S.
- Died: May 28, 1976 (aged 70) Wallingford, Connecticut
- Party: Democratic
- Spouse: Dorothy M. Martin (m. 1939)
- Education: Dartmouth College

John Andrew McGuire (February 28, 1906 – May 28, 1976) was a U.S. representative from Connecticut's 3rd congressional district.

Born in Wallingford, Connecticut, McGuire attended the public schools. He was a student at Lyman Hall High School, Wallingford, in 1924, and graduated from Dartmouth College in 1928. He was employed as a bank clerk from 1928 to 1934.

He was town clerk of Wallingford from January 1, 1934, to December 31, 1949. He served as Democratic State Chairman in 1946. He engaged in general insurance business in Wallingford in 1935. He served as delegate to the Democratic state conventions from 1936 to 1956, and to the Democratic National Convention in 1950.

McGuire was elected as a Democrat from the 81st to the 82nd Congress. He was an unsuccessful candidate for reelection in 1952 to the 83rd Congress.

He resumed his activity in the insurance, real estate, and travel business. He served as a member of Connecticut State Legislature from 1961 to 1962. He was appointed deputy sheriff of New Haven County on November 10, 1969. He was the executive director of the Wallingford Housing Authority at the time of his death. He died in Wallingford, Connecticut, May 28, 1976, and was interred in St. John's Cemetery.

U.S. House of Representatives
Preceded by Ellsworth Foote	Member of the U.S. House of Representatives from Connecticut's 3rd congressional district 1949–1953	Succeeded by Albert W. Cretella
