= Ranulf Compton =

American politician (1878–1974)

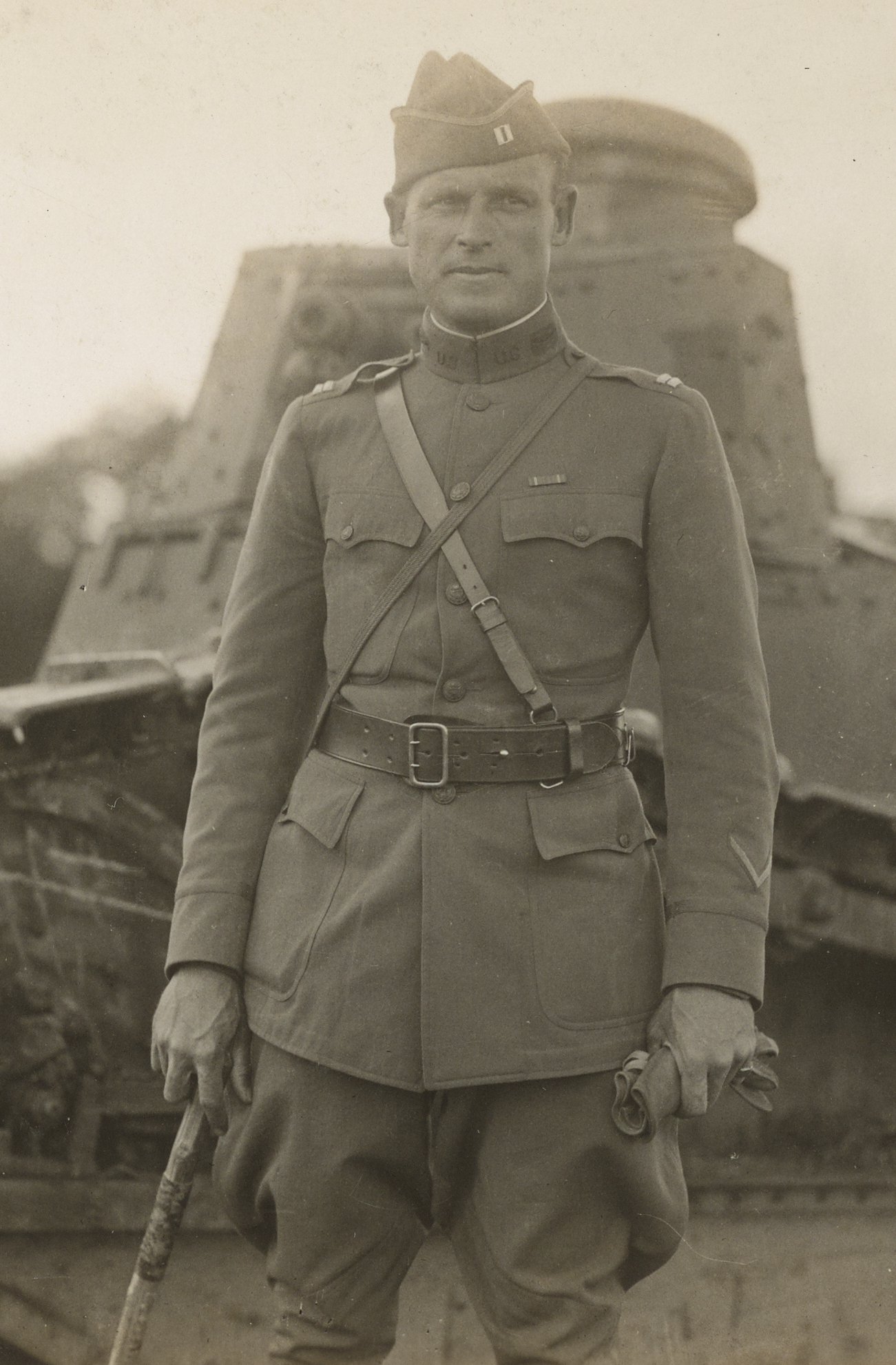
- Compton in uniform, 1918

Member of the U.S. House of Representatives from Connecticut's 3rd district
- In office January 3, 1943 – January 3, 1945
- Preceded by: James A. Shanley
- Succeeded by: James P. Geelan

Personal details
- Born: September 16, 1878 Poe, Indiana, U.S.
- Died: January 26, 1974 (aged 95) Madison, Connecticut, U.S.
- Party: Republican
- Education: Howe Military School; Harvard University

Military service
- Branch/service: United States Army
- Years of service: 1916–1919
- Rank: Major
- Unit: Tank Corps
- Wars: World War I
- Awards: Purple Heart; Legion of Honor (France)

Ranulf Compton (September 16, 1878, Poe, Indiana – January 26, 1974) was a United States representative from Connecticut. He also served as commander of the 327th (345th) Tank Battalion in George S. Patton's 304th (1st Provisional) Tank Brigade on the Western Front in 1918 France.

Compton attended the public schools at Indianapolis, Indiana and was graduated from the Howe Military School, Howe, Indiana in 1899. After graduation, he attended Harvard University. He engaged in banking and finance in New York and Connecticut.

Before and during World War I, he served as captain of infantry, New York National Guard, 1912–1916. He was captain of infantry, United States Army, July 1916 – March 1918, and captain and major in the Tank Corps, April 1918 – August 1919. (He went overseas with the American Expeditionary Forces on December 12, 1917, and was decorated with the Purple Heart and the French Legion of Honor.)

Compton commanded one of the tank battalions in George S. Patton's tank brigade (Sereno E. Brett commanding the other American tank battalion under Patton). When Patton was wounded the first day of the Meuse–Argonne offensive in late September 1918, Brett assumed command of Patton's brigade and Compton assumed command of "all the tanks at the front," and with some of the toughest fighting of the tank brigade still ahead. Compton retired from the United States Army on August 8, 1919, with rank of Major and then served as the military secretary to Governor Nathan L. Miller of New York in 1920.

Compton was the deputy secretary of state of New York in 1921 and 1922. He was the executive secretary and treasurer of the Hudson River Regulating District, Albany, New York 1923-1929 and served as aide-de-camp to Gov. Raymond E. Baldwin of Connecticut in 1940 and 1941.

He was elected as a Republican to the Seventy-eighth Congress (January 3, 1943 – January 3, 1945) but was an unsuccessful candidate for reelection in 1944 to the Seventy-ninth Congress. After Congress, he was the president and owner of South Jersey Broadcasting Company from 1945 until his retirement in 1968. He resided in Madison, Connecticut until his death there in 1974 and was buried in West Cemetery.

U.S. House of Representatives
Preceded by James A. Shanley	Member of the U.S. House of Representatives from Connecticut's 3rd congressional district 1943-1945	Succeeded by James P. Geelan
