= William J. Miller =

American politician (1899–1950)

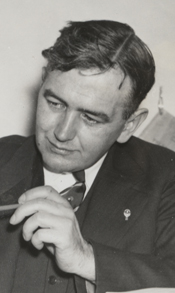

Member of the U.S. House of Representatives from Connecticut's 1st district
- In office January 3, 1947 – January 3, 1949
- Preceded by: Herman P. Kopplemann
- Succeeded by: Abraham Ribicoff
- In office January 3, 1943 – January 3, 1945
- Preceded by: Herman P. Kopplemann
- Succeeded by: Herman P. Kopplemann
- In office January 3, 1939 – January 3, 1941
- Preceded by: Herman P. Kopplemann
- Succeeded by: Herman P. Kopplemann

Personal details
- Born: March 12, 1899 North Andover, Massachusetts, U.S.
- Died: November 22, 1950 (aged 51) Wethersfield, Connecticut, U.S.
- Party: Republican

William Jennings Miller (March 12, 1899 – November 22, 1950) was a U.S. representative from Connecticut.

== Biography ==
Born in North Andover, Massachusetts, to Canadian-born Catherine (née Stewart) and Scottish-born James B. Miller, Miller attended the public schools. He graduated from Cannon's Commercial College, Lawrence, Massachusetts, in 1917. During the First World War, he enlisted August 5, 1917, as a private in the United States Army and served in the Air Service in the 80th Aero Squadron and 1104 Aero Squadrons. Later commissioned a second lieutenant.

He was injured in an airplane crash in France in 1918, resulting in the loss of both legs. He was discharged April 26, 1919. He was a patient in United States veterans' hospitals from 1919 through 1931. He moved to Wethersfield, Connecticut, in 1926. He was engaged in the insurance business in 1931.

Miller was elected as a Republican to the Seventy-sixth Congress (January 3, 1939 – January 3, 1941).

He was an unsuccessful candidate for reelection in 1940 to the Seventy-seventh Congress. Miller was elected to the Seventy-eighth Congress (January 3, 1943 – January 3, 1945). He was an unsuccessful candidate for reelection in 1944 to the Seventy-ninth Congress.

Miller was elected in 1946 to the Eightieth Congress (January 3, 1947 – January 3, 1949). He was an unsuccessful candidate for reelection in 1948 to the Eighty-first Congress. He resumed the general insurance business. He died in Wethersfield, Connecticut on November 22, 1950. He was interred in Jordan Cemetery, Waterford, Connecticut.

U.S. House of Representatives
Preceded by Herman P. Kopplemann	Member of the U.S. House of Representatives from Connecticut's 1st congressional district 1939–1941	Succeeded by Herman P. Kopplemann
Preceded by Herman P. Kopplemann	Member of the U.S. House of Representatives from Connecticut's 1st congressional district 1943–1945	Succeeded by Herman P. Kopplemann
Preceded by Herman P. Kopplemann	Member of the U.S. House of Representatives from Connecticut's 1st congressional district 1947–1949	Succeeded by Abraham Ribicoff
