= Steven H. Kaplan =

American academic and university administrator

Steve Kaplan
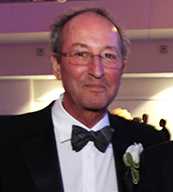
- Steven H. Kaplan in 2013

6th President of the University of New Haven
- In office 2004–2022
- Preceded by: Lawrence J. DeNardis
- Succeeded by: Sheahon Zenger

Personal details
- Born: Chicago, Illinois, U.S.
- Education: University of California, Los Angeles (BA, MA); University of Tübingen (PhD)
- Website: New Haven website

Steven H. Kaplan is an American academic and university administrator. Kaplan became president of the University of New Haven in 2004, and he served in this position until 2022. He took a lesser position in 2022 as the university's chancellor and CEO, and he has announced his intention to step down entirely in June 2023.
