= 2002 United States House of Representatives elections in Connecticut =

- November 5, 2002

All 5 Connecticut seats to the United States House of Representatives
	Majority party	Minority party
Party	Republican	Democratic
Last election	3	3
Seats won	3	2
Seat change	Steady	▼1
Popular vote	465,982	509,036
Percentage	47.1%	51.5%

Republican
40–50%
50–60%
60–70%
70–80%
80–90%
Democratic
50–60%
60–70%
70–80%
80–90%

The 2002 United States House of Representatives elections in Connecticut were held on November 5, 2002, to elect the five members of the U.S. House, one from each of the state's congressional districts, to represent Connecticut in the 108th Congress. The elections coincided with the gubernatorial election as well as with Congressional elections in other states.

During redistricting, Connecticut lost 1 congressional district, pitting incumbents Nancy L. Johnson and James H. Maloney against each other. Maloney lost, reducing the Democratic seat total to 2, and giving Republicans the majority of seats. Despite winning more seats, Republicans did not win the popular vote.

Connecticut was one of five states in which the party that won the state's popular vote did not win a majority of seats in 2002, the other states being Illinois, Michigan, New Mexico,Tennessee, and Texas.

== Overview ==
United States House of Representatives elections in Connecticut, 2002
Party	Votes	Percentage	Seats	+/–
Democratic	509,036	51.45%	2	-1
Republican	465,982	47.10%	3	0
Green	9,050	0.91%	0	0
Concerned Citizens	3,709	0.37%	0	0
Libertarian	1,503	0.15%	0	0
Write-in candidates	29	<0.01%	0	0
Totals	989,309	100.00%	5	—

== District 1 ==
2002 Connecticut's 1st congressional district election
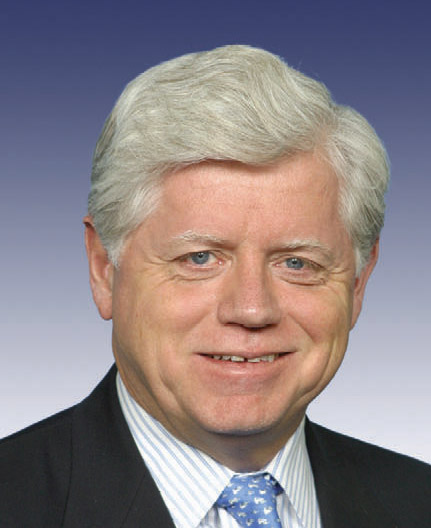

Nominee	John B. Larson	Phil Steele
Party	Democratic	Republican
Popular vote	134,698	66,968
Percentage	66.8%	33.2%
- Municipality results Larson: 50–60% 60–70% 70–80% 80–90% Steele: 50–60% 60–70%
U.S. Representative before election
John B. Larson
Democratic
Elected U.S. Representative
John B. Larson
Democratic

Two term incumbent, Democrat John Larson, faced Republican challenger Phil Steele in the election; Larson was re-elected to a third term with 72.98 percent of the vote.

=== Democratic primary ===
==== Candidates ====
===== Nominee =====
- John Larson, incumbent representative (1999-2026)

=== Republican primary ===
==== Candidates ====
===== Nominee =====
- Phil Steele, candidate for this seat in 1992, brother of former U.S. Representative from Connecticut's 2nd congressional district Robert H. Steele (1970-1975), sons of radio personality Bob Steele

===== Eliminated in primary =====
- Miriam J. Masullo, researcher for IBM Research

==== Primary results ====
Republican primary results
Party	Candidate	Votes	%
Republican	Paul Steele	2,109	64.42%
Republican	Miriam J. Masullo	1,165	35.58%
Total votes		3,274	100.0%

=== Write-in candidacies ===
==== Candidates ====
- Miriam J. Masullo, researcher for IBM Research (Previously a candidate for the Republican nomination)
- Max Welch, 24 year old from East Hartford

=== General Election ===
Results

Connecticut's First Congressional District election, 2002
Party	Candidate	Votes	%
Democratic	John Larson (incumbent)	134,698	66.79%
Republican	Phil Steele	66,968	33.20%
Write-in	Miriam J. Masullo	18	0.01%
Write-in	Max F. Welch	4	<0.01%
Total votes		201,688	100.00%
Democratic hold			

== District 2 ==
2002 Connecticut's 2nd congressional district election
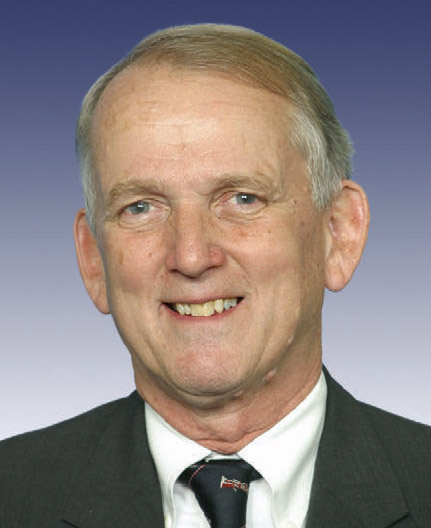

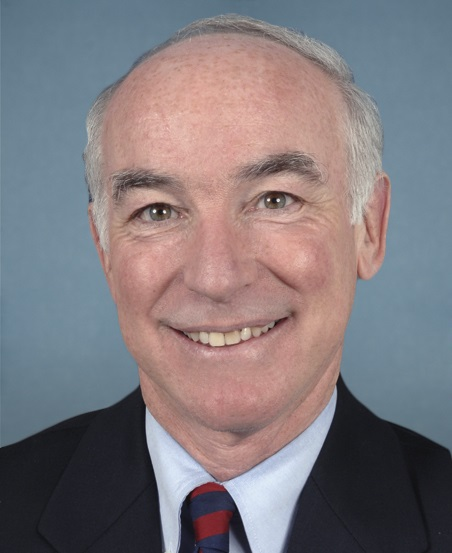
Nominee	Rob Simmons	Joe Courtney
Party	Republican	Democratic
Popular vote	117,434	99,674
Percentage	54.1%	45.9%
- Municipality results Simmons: 50–60% 60–70% Courtney: 50–60% 60–70%
U.S. Representative before election
Rob Simmons
Republican
Elected U.S. Representative
Rob Simmons
Republican

One-term incumbent Republican Rob Simmons went up against Democratic nominee former state representative Joe Courtney. Simmons won re-election to a second term with 54.09% of the vote and a margin of 8.18%.

=== Predictions ===
Source	Ranking	As of
New York Times	Lean R	October 14, 2002
Sabato's Crystal Ball	Lean R	November 4, 2002

=== Republican primary ===
==== Candidates ====
===== Nominee =====
- Rob Simmons, incumbent representative (2001-2007)

=== Democratic primary ===
==== Candidates ====
===== Nominee =====
- Joe Courtney, former State Representative from the 56th district and nominee for lieutenant governor in 1998

=== General election ===
Results

Connecticut's Second Congressional District election, 2002
Party	Candidate	Votes	%
Republican	Rob Simmons (incumbent)	117,434	54.09%
Democratic	Joe Courtney	99,674	45.91%
Total votes		217,108	100.00%
Republican hold			

== District 3 ==
2002 Connecticut's 3rd congressional district election
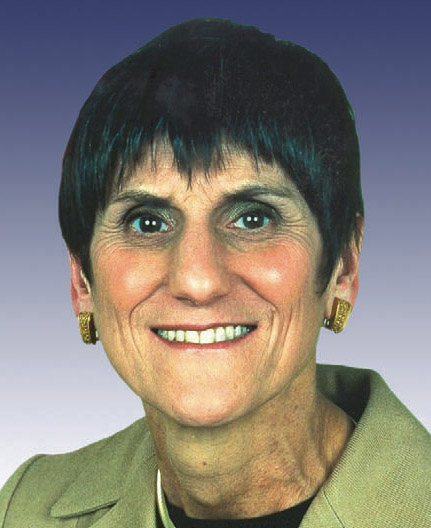

Nominee	Rosa DeLauro	Richter Elser
Party	Democratic	Republican
Popular vote	121,557	54,757
Percentage	65.6%	29.54%
- Municipality results DeLauro: 50–60% 60–70% 70–80%
U.S. Representative before election
Rosa DeLauro
Democratic
Elected U.S. Representative
Rosa DeLauro
Democratic

Incumbent Democrat Rosa DeLauro faced Republican challenger Richter Elser and Green challenger in the election; DeLauro was re-elected by a margin of 36.04%.

=== Democratic primary ===
==== Candidates ====
===== Nominee =====
- Rosa DeLauro, incumbent representative (1991-)

=== Republican primary ===
==== Candidates ====
===== Nominee =====
- Richter Elser, restaurateur

=== Green primary ===
==== Candidates ====
===== Nominee =====
- Charles Pillsbury, mediator and lawyer

=== General Election ===
Results

Connecticut's Third Congressional District election, 2002
Party	Candidate	Votes	%
Democratic	Rosa DeLauro (incumbent)	121,557	65.58%
Republican	Richter Elser	54,757	29.54%
Green	Charles Pillsbury	9,050	4.88%
Total votes		185,364	100.00%
Democratic hold			

== District 4 ==
2002 Connecticut's 4th congressional district election
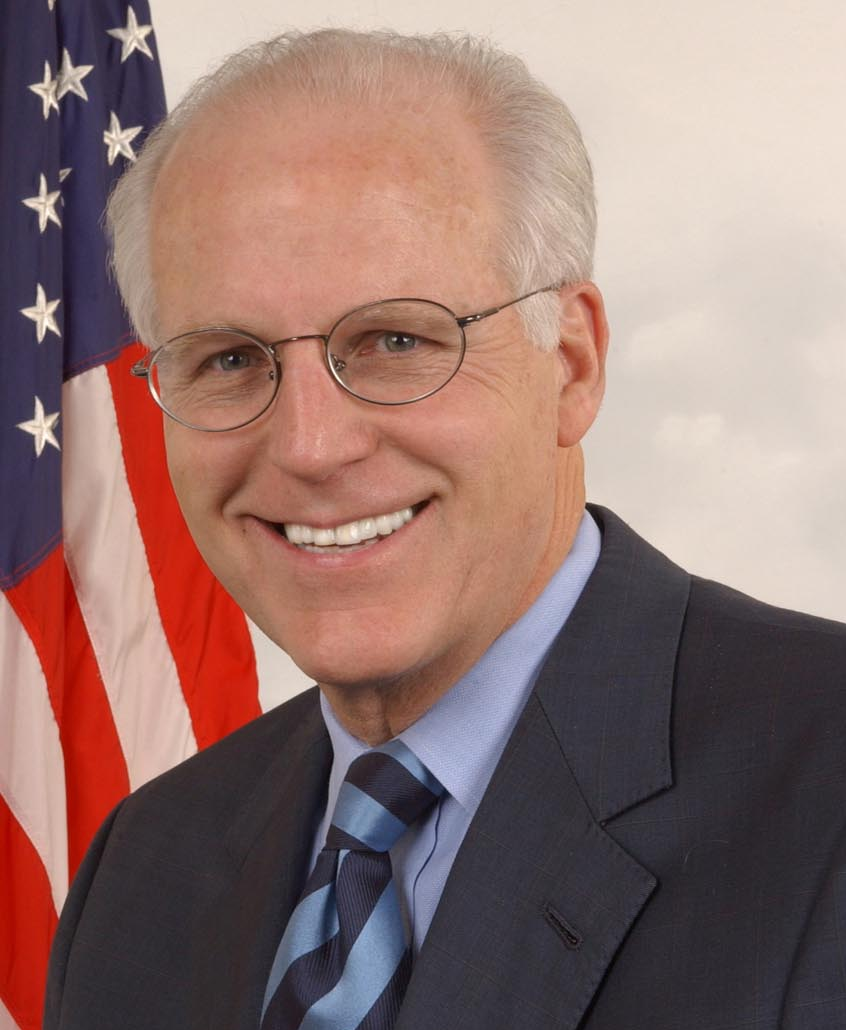

Nominee	Chris Shays	Stephanie Sanchez
Party	Republican	Democratic
Popular vote	113,197	62,491
Percentage	64.4%	35.6%
- Municipality results Shays: 50–60% 60–70% 70–80% 80–90% Sanchez: 60–70%
U.S. Representative before election
Chris Shays
Republican
Elected U.S. Representative
Chris Shays
Republican

Eight-term incumbent Republican Christopher Shays faced Democratic challenger Stephanie Sanchez in the election; Shays was re-elected with 64.4 percent of the vote, a 28.86% margin.

=== Republican primary ===
==== Candidates ====
===== Nominee =====
- Christopher Shays, incumbent representative (1987-2009)

=== Democratic primary ===
==== Candidates ====
===== Nominee =====
- Stephanie Sanchez, Greenwich selectwoman, and candidate for this seat in 2000

=== Write-in canadacies ===
==== Candidates ====
===== Nominee =====
- Carl E. Vassar, Libertarian nominee in 2000 for the 22nd state senate district

=== General election ===
Results

Connecticut's Fourth Congressional District election 2002
Party	Candidate	Votes	%
Republican	Christopher Shays (incumbent)	113,197	64.43%
Democratic	Stephanie Sanchez	62,491	35.57%
Write-in	Carl E. Vassar	7	<0.01%
Total votes		175,695	100.00%
Republican hold			

== District 5 ==
2002 Connecticut's 5th congressional district election
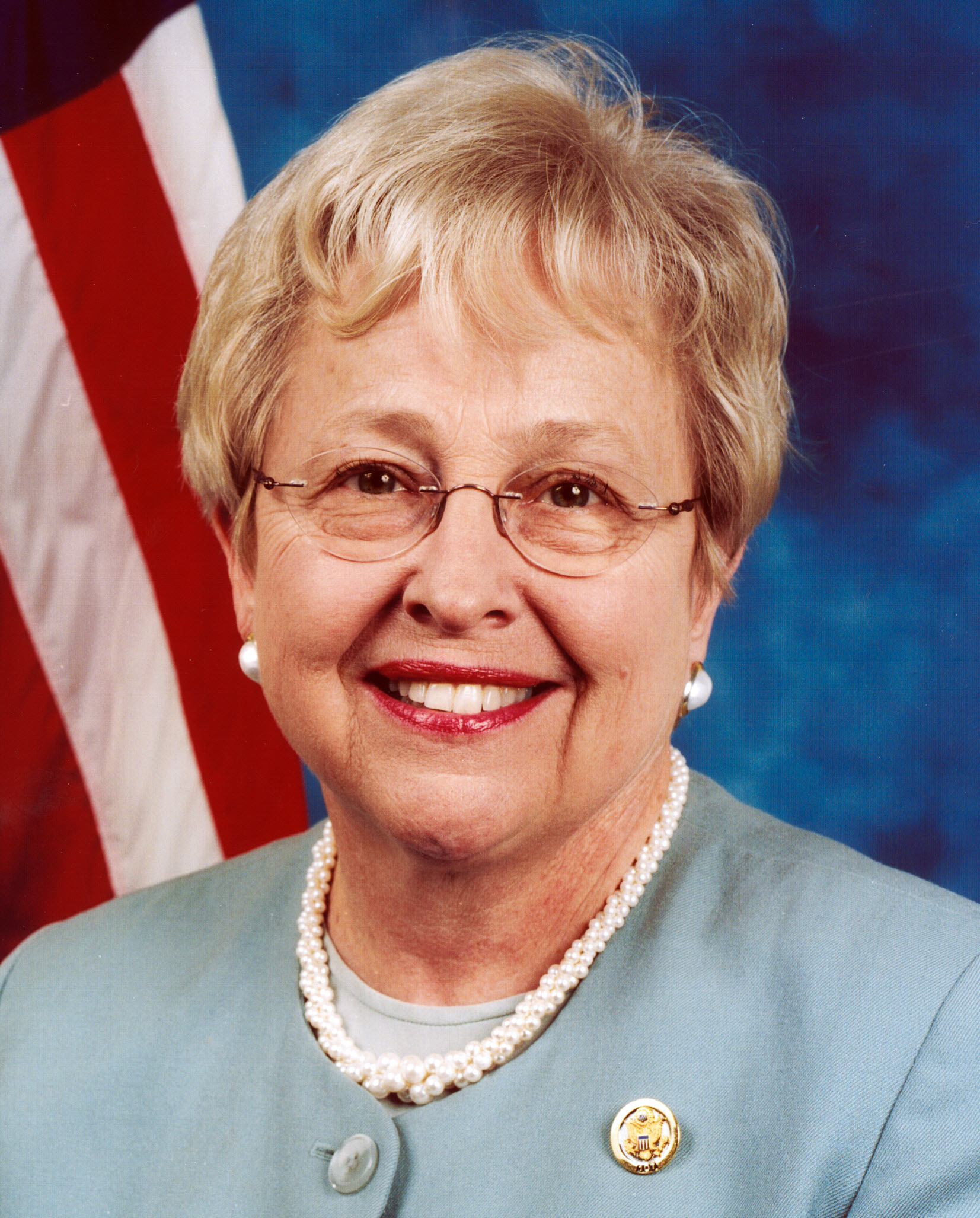

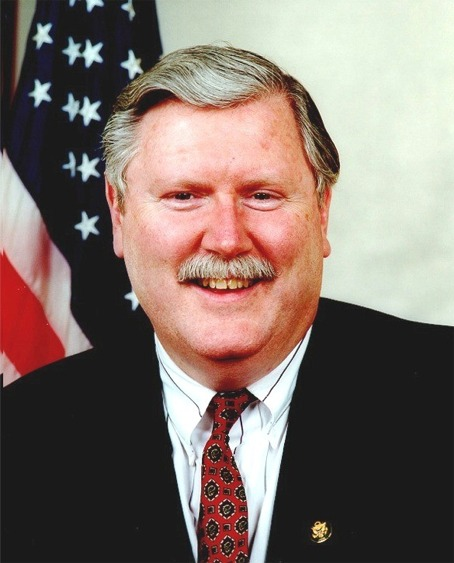
Nominee	Nancy L. Johnson	James H. Maloney
Party	Republican	Democratic
Popular vote	113,626	90,616
Percentage	54.3%	43.3%
- Municipality results Johnson: 40–50% 50–60% 60–70% Maloney: 50–60% 60–70%
U.S. Representative before election
James H. Maloney (Democratic)
Nancy L. Johnson (Note: Incumbent of the 6th, which was merged with the 5th during redistricting) (Republican)
Elected U.S. Representative
Nancy L. Johnson
Republican

Incumbents Democratic Representative James H. Maloney and 6th district Representative Nancy L. Johnson were redistricted into a single district. Johnson defeated the Maloney with 54.25% of the vote, a 10.99% margin.

=== Predictions ===
Source	Ranking	As of
New York Times	Tossup	October 14, 2002
Sabato's Crystal Ball	Lean R (Flip)	November 4, 2002

=== Republican primary ===
==== Candidates ====
===== Nominee =====
- Nancy L. Johnson, incumbent representative of the 6th district (1983-2007)

=== Democratic primary ===
==== Candidates ====
===== Nominee =====
- James H. Maloney, incumbent representative (1997-2003)

=== Concerned Citizens primary ===
==== Candidates ====
===== Nominee =====
- Joseph Zdonczyck, founder of the Concerned Citizens Party of Connecticut and three time gubernatorial nominee

=== Libertarian primary ===
==== Candidates ====
===== Nominee =====
- Waller Gengarelly, 1982 gubernatorial nominee

=== General election ===
Results

Connecticut's Fifth Congressional District election, 2002
Party	Candidate	Votes	%
Republican	Nancy L. Johnson (incumbent)	113,626	54.25%
Democratic	James H. Maloney (Incumbent)	90,616	43.26%
Concerned Citizens	Joseph Zdonczyk	3,709	1.77%
Libertarian	Walter Gengarelly	1,503	0.72%
Total votes		209,454	100.00%
Republican gain from Democratic			
