= Robert Giaimo =

American politician (1919–2006)

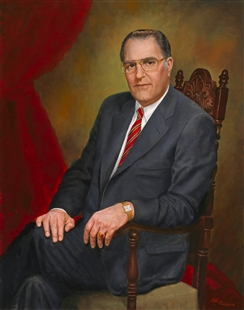
- Portrait of Giaimo, 1979

Chair of the House Budget Committee
- In office January 3, 1977 – January 3, 1981
- Preceded by: Brock Adams
- Succeeded by: James R. Jones

Member of the U.S. House of Representatives from Connecticut's 3rd district
- In office January 3, 1959 – January 3, 1981
- Preceded by: Albert W. Cretella
- Succeeded by: Lawrence Joseph DeNardis

Personal details
- Born: Robert Nicholas Giaimo; October 15, 1919 New Haven, Connecticut, U.S.
- Died: May 24, 2006 (aged 86) Arlington, Virginia, U.S.
- Party: Democratic
- Profession: Attorney

Robert Nicholas Giaimo (October 15, 1919 – May 24, 2006) was a Democratic US representative from Connecticut. He co-sponsored the legislation creating the National Endowment for the Arts and the National Endowment for the Humanities. He helped create the Washington Metro and sponsored legislation eliminating the loyalty oath requirement for college students applying for a federal grant.

== Early life and career ==
Born in New Haven, Connecticut, Giaimo was the son of an immigrant from Sicily who founded the city's Community Bank and Trust Company, which provided loans to many of his fellow immigrants. He attended North Haven public schools and graduated from Fordham University in 1941 and earned his law degree at the University of Connecticut in 1943.

He served in the United States Army from 1943 until separated from the service as a first lieutenant in 1946 (he continued serving as a captain, Judge Advocate General Corps, United States Army Reserve). He was admitted to the bar in 1947 and commenced practicing law in New Haven, Connecticut. He became a member of North Haven Board of Education from 1949 to 1955 and an assistant clerk to the Probate Court in New Haven between 1952 and 1954. He rose to chairman of the Connecticut Personnel Appeals Board for the period 1955–1958 and was third selectman, North Haven, from 1955 to 1957.

== Congressional career ==
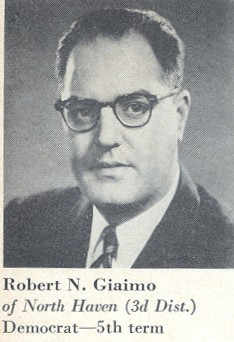
1967, Congressional Pictorial Directory

Politically, he was an unsuccessful Democratic candidate for election in 1956 to the Eighty-fifth United States Congress.

He succeeded in being elected as a Democrat to the Eighty-sixth United States Congress and to the ten succeeding Congresses (January 3, 1959 – January 3, 1981). During the Ninety-fifth and Ninety-sixth United States Congresses he acted as chairman of the House Committee on the Budget. Giaimo was not a candidate for reelection to the Ninety-seventh United States Congress in 1980.

He died in Arlington, Virginia, of complications from heart and lung disease.

U.S. House of Representatives
Preceded by Albert W. Cretella	Member of the U.S. House of Representatives from Connecticut's 3rd congressional district January 3, 1959 – January 3, 1981	Succeeded by Lawrence Joseph DeNardis
