= Lawrence J. DeNardis =

American politician (1938–2018)

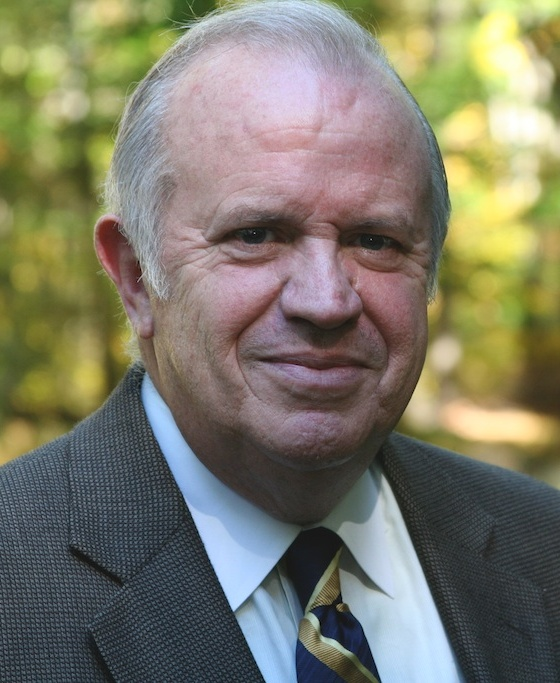
- DeNardis in 2007

5th President of the University of New Haven
- In office 1991–2004
- Preceded by: Phillip S. Kaplan
- Succeeded by: Steven H. Kaplan

Member of the U.S. House of Representatives from Connecticut's 3rd district
- In office January 3, 1981 – January 3, 1983
- Preceded by: Robert Giaimo
- Succeeded by: Bruce Morrison

Member of the Connecticut State Senate from the 34th district
- In office January 6, 1971 – December 31, 1979
- Preceded by: Pasquale A. Barbato
- Succeeded by: Philip S. Robertson

Personal details
- Born: Lawrence Joseph DeNardis; March 18, 1938 New Haven, Connecticut, U.S.
- Died: August 24, 2018 (aged 80) New Haven, Connecticut, U.S.
- Party: Republican
- Spouse: Mary Louise White (m. 1961; died 2018)
- Education: College of the Holy Cross (BS); New York University (MA, PhD)

Lawrence Joseph "Larry" DeNardis (March 18, 1938 – August 24, 2018) was an American political scientist and politician who served as the U.S. representative from Connecticut's 3rd district from 1981 to 1983. He was previously a member of the Connecticut State Senate from 1971 to 1979. After leaving Congress, he was the president of the University of New Haven from 1991 to 2004.

== Early life and education ==
DeNardis was born in New Haven, Connecticut, on March 18, 1938, and graduated from Hamden High School in 1956. After high school, he attended the College of the Holy Cross in Worcester, Massachusetts, and graduated with a Bachelor of Science in economics in 1960.

After graduating from Holy Cross, DeNardis served in the United States Naval Reserve from 1960 to 1963. He then earned his Master of Arts in political science in 1964 and his Ph.D. in political science in 1989 from New York University. His doctoral dissertation was titled, "The new Senate filibuster: An analysis of filibustering and gridlock in the US Senate, 1977-1986".

After obtaining his doctorate, he became an associate professor at Albertus Magnus College.

== Political career ==
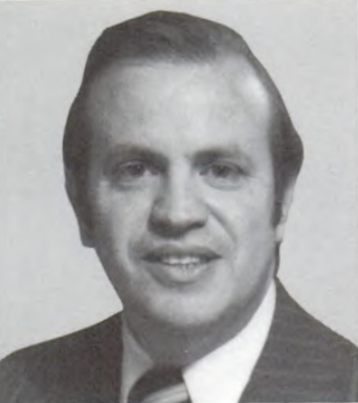
DeNardis as a member of Congress in 1981

DeNardis was active in Republican Party politics in the 1960s, serving as a delegate to the state Republican conventions beginning in 1966. In 1970, he became a member of the Connecticut State Senate. He served in the Senate until 1979, when he resigned to become President of the Connecticut Conference of Independent Colleges.

In 1980, he ran for the United States House of Representatives from 3rd congressional district that Democrat Rep. Robert Giaimo had held for 22 years before retiring. Although the Democratic Party had a significant advantage in voter registration, the district supported Ronald Reagan by 25,769 votes in the presidential election and DeNardis defeated then-State Senator Joe Lieberman by 13,121 votes.

In the Ninety-seventh United States Congress, he was a leader of the “gypsy moths”, a grouping of moderate Republicans that opposed some of Reagan’s budget cuts. He ultimately supported some of the cuts, but retained a $16 million grant to renovate the train station in New Haven.

In 1982, he faced Democrat Bruce Morrison, the Executive Director of the New Haven Legal Assistance Association. Morrison was a former classmate of Bill Clinton at Yale Law School. Although DeNardis touted his opposition to some of Reagan’s initiatives, the district had a 110,000 –55,000 registration advantage and Morrison prevailed in the election by 1,687 votes.

In 1984, DeNardis sought to win back his seat in a strong Republican year. Despite Reagan’s margin of more than 20% in Connecticut and the Republican capture of both houses of the Connecticut General Assembly, he again lost to Morrison.

== After Congress ==
After losing the 1984 election, DeNardis was given a political appointment in the Reagan Administration, serving as assistant secretary in the U.S. Department of Health and Human Services from 1985 to 1987.

He joined the University of New Haven as President, serving in that position from 1991 to 2004 before becoming President Emeritus. He succeeded Phillip S. Kaplan. He led a great expansion of programs and facilities during his tenure as the University's President, including substantial international programs, and participated in international election monitoring missions. After retiring as university president, he continued to serve as a member of the faculty, teaching national security policy. He also was chairman of the Institute for New Democracies, a nongovernmental organization that advises evolving democracies. He was an independent election observer in central Asian countries, and in December 2009 was an advisor to the Democratic League of Kosovo (LDK) as it participated in local elections in Kosovo.

He briefly ran for Governor of Connecticut in 2010 as a Republican but failed to receive enough support from delegates to qualify for the primary ballot.

DeNardis died after a brief hospitalization in New Haven on August 24, 2018, at the age of 80.

== Personal life ==
DeNardis married Mary Louise White in 1961, and they remained married until his death in 2018. Together, they had four children. One of their children, Lesley DeNardis, served as a member of the Hamden Board of Education and was the Republican nominee for Connecticut's 3rd congressional district in the 2022 election.

Connecticut State Senate
Preceded by Pasquale A. Barbato	Member of the Connecticut State Senate from the 34th district 1971–1979	Succeeded by Philip S. Robertson
U.S. House of Representatives
Preceded by Robert Giaimo	Member of the U.S. House of Representatives from Connecticut's 3rd congressional district 1981–1983	Succeeded by Bruce Morrison
Academic offices
Preceded by Phillip S. Kaplan	President of the University of New Haven; 1991–2004	Succeeded by Steven H. Kaplan
