= Connecticut's 6th congressional district =

Former U.S. House district from 1837 to 2003

- Obsolete district
- Created: 1837; 1960
- Eliminated: 1840; 2000
- Years active: 1837–1843; 1965–2003

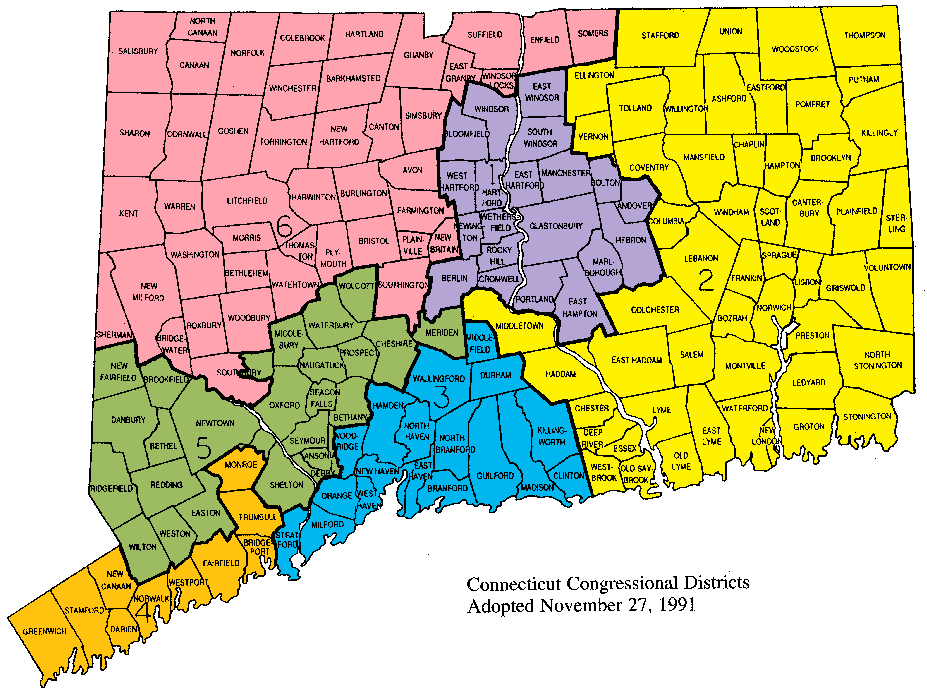
Connecticut's congressional districts, 1993–2003 (prior to elimination of 6th district). The sixth district is in the northwest corner, highlighted in pink.

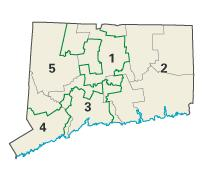
Connecticut's congressional districts, 2003-2013

Connecticut's 6th congressional district is a former district, which was eliminated in 2003, following the 2000 census. It was initially created in 1837 from Connecticut's at-large district, yet was eliminated after the 1840 census. In 1965, following passage of the Voting Rights Act, it was re-established.

During redistricting in 2002, a majority of the district was merged with the 5th district.

Prior to its elimination, the district included Litchfield County, the Farmington Valley, and commununties surrounding Hartford, including Bristol, Enfield, and New Britain.

== List of members representing the district ==
Member (Residence)	Party	Years of service	Cong ress(es)	Electoral history
District created March 4, 1837
Orrin Holt (Willington)	Democratic	March 4, 1837 – March 3, 1839	25th	Redistricted from the at-large district and re-elected in 1837. Retired.
John H. Brockway (Ellington)	Whig	March 4, 1839 – March 3, 1843	26th 27th	Elected in 1839. Re-elected in 1840. Retired.
District eliminated following the 1840 United States census on March 3, 1843
District restored January 3, 1965
Bernard Grabowski (Bristol)	Democratic	January 3, 1965 – January 3, 1967	89th	Redistricted from the at-large district and re-elected in 1964. Lost re-election.
Thomas Meskill (New Britain)	Republican	January 3, 1967 – January 3, 1971	90th 91st	Elected in 1966. Re-elected in 1968. Retired to run for Governor of Connecticut.
Ella Grasso (Windsor Locks)	Democratic	January 3, 1971 – January 3, 1975	92nd 93rd	Elected in 1970. Re-elected in 1972. Retired to run for Governor of Connecticut.
Toby Moffett (Unionville)	Democratic	January 3, 1975 – January 3, 1983	94th 95th 96th 97th	Elected in 1974. Re-elected in 1976. Re-elected in 1978. Re-elected in 1980. Retired to run for U.S. senator.
Nancy Johnson (New Britain)	Republican	January 3, 1983 – January 3, 2003	98th 99th 100th 101st 102nd 103rd 104th 105th 106th 107th	Elected in 1982. Re-elected in 1984. Re-elected in 1986. Re-elected in 1988. Re-elected in 1990. Re-elected in 1992. Re-elected in 1994. Re-elected in 1996. Re-elected in 1998. Re-elected in 2000. Redistricted to the 5th district.
District eliminated following the 2000 United States census on January 3, 2003
