= 1996 United States House of Representatives elections in Connecticut =

- November 5, 1996

All 6 Connecticut seats to the United States House of Representatives
- Turnout: 75.0%
	Majority party	Minority party
Party	Democratic	Republican
Last election	3	3
Seats won	4	2
Seat change	▲1	▼1
Popular vote	723,504	547,084
Percentage	55.90%	42.27%
Swing	▲8.55%	▼6.01%

Democratic hold Democratic gain
Republican hold
Democratic
40–50%
50–60%
60–70%
70–80%
80–90%
Republican
40–50%
50–60%
60–70%
70–80%
80–90%

The 1996 United States House of Representatives elections in Connecticut were held on November 5, 1996, to elect the six members of the U.S. House, one from each of the state's congressional districts, to represent Connecticut in the 105th Congress. These elections coincided with a U.S. presidential election, as well as elections to the state legislature.

Democrats picked up the 5th district held by incumbent Republican Gary Franks, while all other incumbents won re-election to their districts.

== Overview ==
United States House of Representatives elections in Connecticut, 1996
Party	Votes	Percentage	Seats	+/–
Democratic (Note: The A Connecticut Party cross-endorsed five of the six Democratic nominees, but did not run any of its own candidates. Therefore the official canvass for the Democratic Party includes 49,197 votes cast for the ACP.)	723,504	55.90%	4	+1
Republican	547,084	42.27%	2	-1
Concerned Citizens	8,385	0.65%	0	0
Independence	6,477	0.50%	0	0
Natural Law	4,677	0.36%	0	0
Libertarian	4,206	0.32%	0	0
Write-in candidates	2	0.00%	0	0
Totals	1,294,335	100.00%	6	—

Popular vote
Democratic	55.90%
Republican	42.27%

House seats
Democratic	66.7%
Republican	33.3%

== District 1 ==
1996 Connecticut's 1st congressional district election
- Turnout: 76.03%
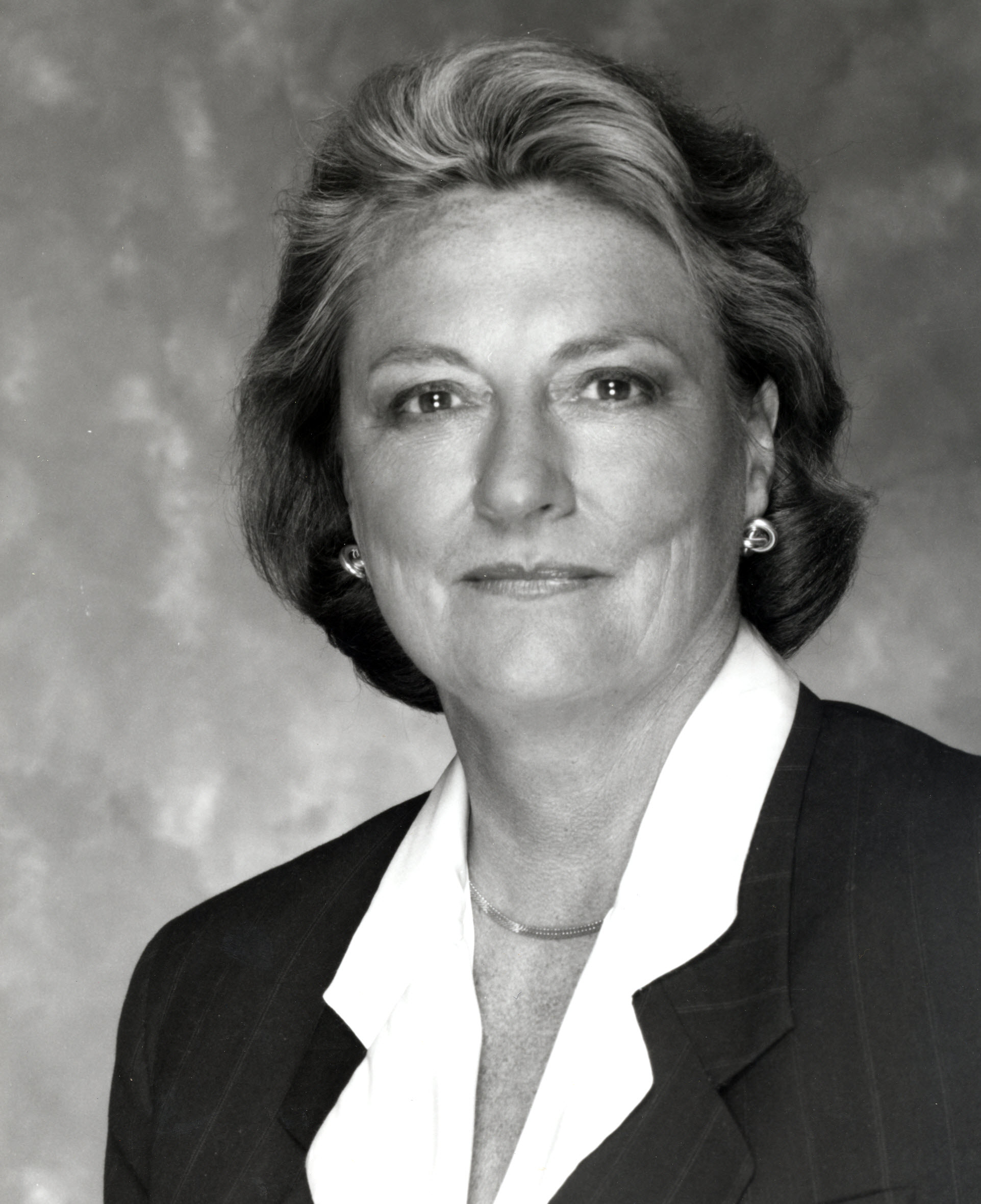

Nominee	Barbara Kennelly	Kent Sleath
Party	Democratic	Republican
Alliance	A Connecticut
Popular vote	158,222	53,666
Percentage	73.54%	24.95%
- Municipality results Kennelly 60–70% 70–80% 80–90%
U.S. Representative before election
Barbara Kennelly
Democratic
Elected U.S. Representative
Barbara Kennelly
Democratic

Incumbent Democrat Barbara Kennelly, who was originally elected in 1981, defeated Republican nominee Kent Sleath with 73.5% of the vote.

Results

1996 Connecticut's 1st congressional district election
Party	Candidate	Votes	%
Democratic	Barbara Kennelly	145,169	67.48%
A Connecticut Party	Barbara Kennelly	13,053	6.06%
Total	Barbara Kennelly (incumbent)	158,222	73.54%
Republican	Kent Sleath	53,666	24.95%
Concerned Citizens	John F. Forry III	2,099	0.98%
Natural Law	Daniel A. Wasielewski	1,149	0.53%
Total votes		215,136	100.00%
Democratic hold			

== District 2 ==
1996 Connecticut's 2nd congressional district election
- Turnout: 75.51%
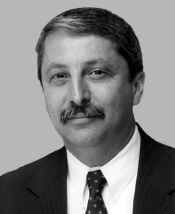

Nominee	Sam Gejdenson	Edward W. Munster
Party	Democratic	Republican
Alliance	A Connecticut
Popular vote	115,175	100,332
Percentage	51.59%	44.94%
- Municipality results Gejdenson 40–50% 50–60% 60–70% Munster 40–50% 50–60%
U.S. Representative before election
Sam Gejdenson
Democratic
Elected U.S. Representative
Sam Gejdenson
Democratic

After a narrow reelection in 1994 in which he only won by 21 votes, incumbent Democrat Sam Gejdenson won reelection to a ninth term in his third contest against former state Senator Edward W. Munster.

=== Republican primary ===
==== Candidates ====
===== Nominee =====
- Edward W. Munster, former state Senator from the 33rd district (1991-1993) and candidate for this seat in 1992 and 1994

===== Eliminated in primary =====
- Andrew Norton, state Representative from the 48th district

=== General election ===
==== Results ====
1996 Connecticut's 2nd congressional district election
Party	Candidate	Votes	%
Democratic	Sam Gejdenson	106,544	47.72%
A Connecticut Party	Sam Gejdenson	8,631	3.87%
Total	Sam Gejdenson (incumbent)	115,175	51.59%
Republican	Edward W. Munster	100,332	44.94%
Independent Party	Dianne G. Ondusko	6,477	2.90%
Natural Law	Thomas E. Hall	1,263	0.57%
Write-in	Howard E. Proper Lamchick	2	0.00%
Total votes		223,249	100.00%
Democratic hold			

== District 3 ==
1996 Connecticut's 3rd congressional district election
- Turnout: 72.56%
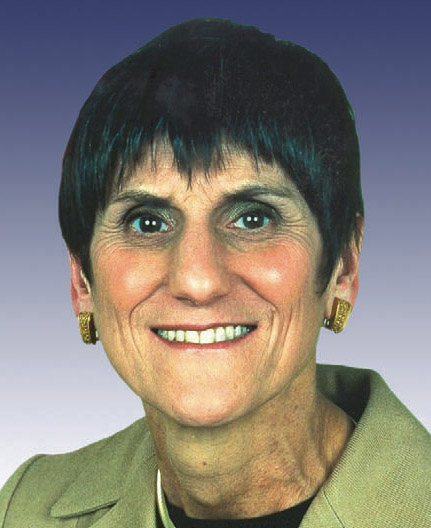

Nominee	Rosa DeLauro	John Coppola
Party	Democratic	Republican
Alliance	A Connecticut
Popular vote	150,798	59,335
Percentage	71.35%	28.07%
- Municipality results DeLauro 50–60% 60–70% 70–80% 80–90%
U.S. Representative before election
Rosa DeLauro
Democratic
Elected U.S. Representative
Rosa DeLauro
Democratic

Incumbent Democrat Rosa DeLauro won re-election to a fourth term, defeating Republican nominee John Coppola with 71.4% of the vote.

Results

1996 Connecticut's 3rd congressional district election
Party	Candidate	Votes	%
Democratic	Rosa DeLauro	137,108	64.87%
A Connecticut Party	Rosa DeLauro	13,690	6.48%
Total	Rosa DeLauro (incumbent)	150,798	71.35%
Republican	John Coppola	59,335	28.07%
Natural Law	Gail J. Dalby	1,219	0.58%
Total votes		211,352	100.00%
Democratic hold			

== District 4 ==
1996 Connecticut's 4th congressional district election
- Turnout: 74.58%
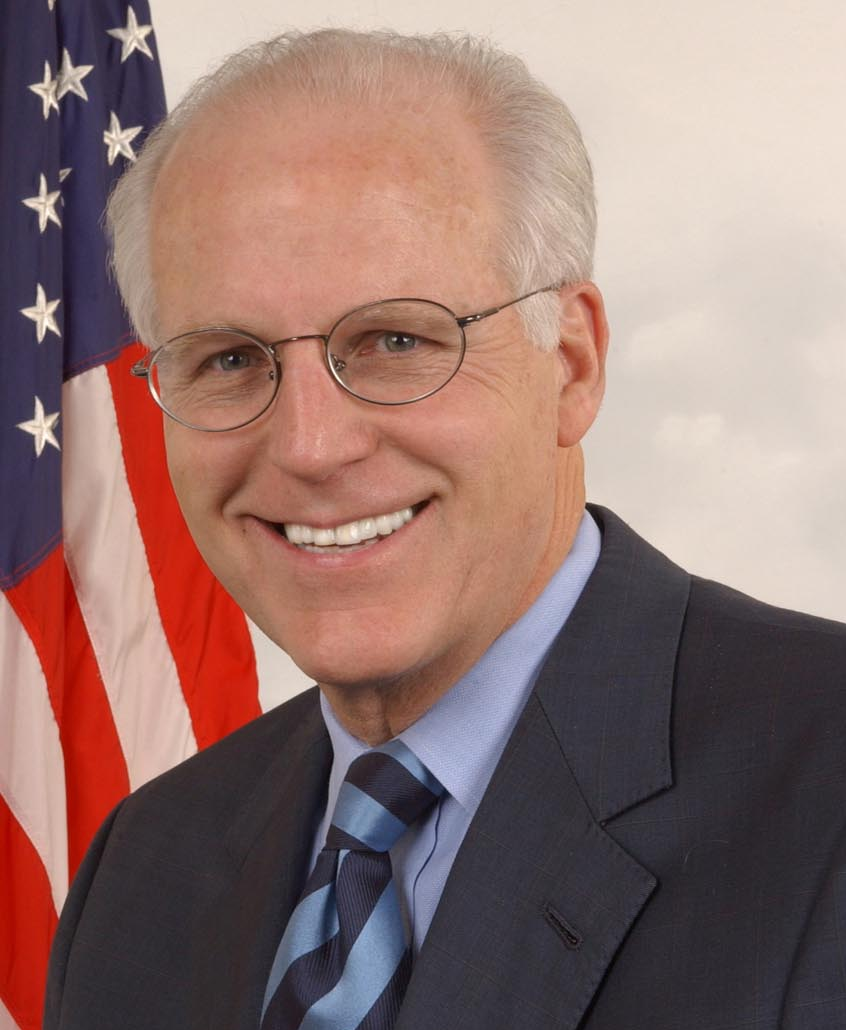

Nominee	Chris Shays	Bill Finch
Party	Republican	Democratic
Popular vote	121,949	75,902
Percentage	60.46%	37.63%
- Municipality results Shays 50–60% 60–70% 70-80% 80-90% Finch 60–70%
U.S. Representative before election
Chris Shays
Republican
Elected U.S. Representative
Chris Shays
Republican

Incumbent Republican Christopher Shays, originally elected in 1987, defeated Democratic nominee and Bridgeport councilman Bill Finch with 60.5% of the vote.

Results

1996 Connecticut's 4th congressional district election
Party	Candidate	Votes	%
Republican	Chris Shays (incumbent)	121,949	60.46%
Democratic	Bill Finch	75,902	37.63%
Libertarian	Edward H. Tonkin	2,815	1.39%
Natural Law	Terry M. Nevas	1,046	0.52%
Total votes		201,712	100.00%
Republican hold			

== District 5 ==
1996 Connecticut's 5th congressional district election
- Turnout: 74.66%
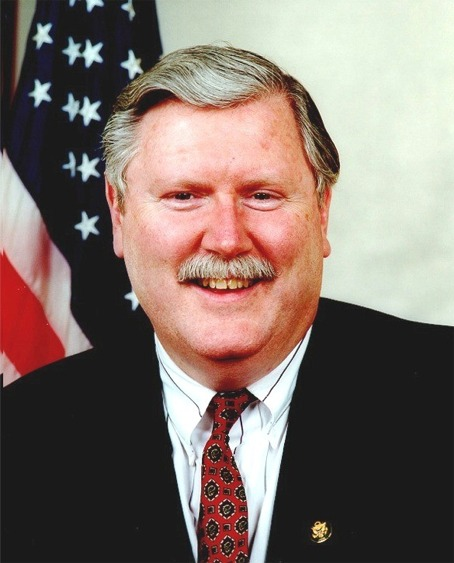

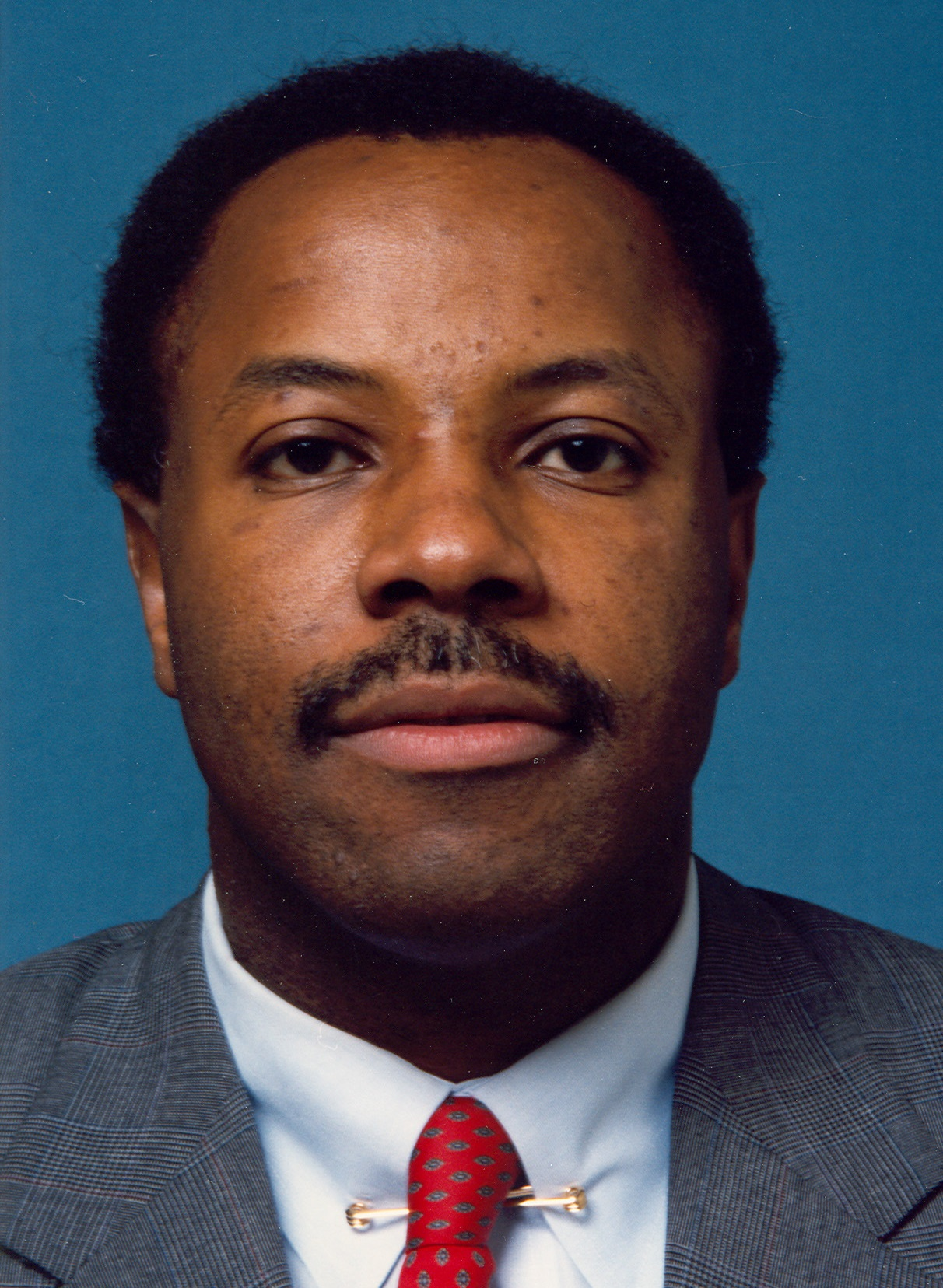
Nominee	James H. Maloney	Gary Franks
Party	Democratic	Republican
Alliance	A Connecticut
Popular vote	111,974	98,782
Percentage	52.05%	45.92%
- Municipality results Maloney 40–50% 50–60% 60–70% Franks 40–50% 50–60% 60–70%
U.S. Representative before election
Gary Franks
Republican
Elected U.S. Representative
James H. Maloney
Democratic

Incumbent Republican Gary Franks lost re-election in a re-match against former state Senator James H. Maloney.

This was the first time that a congressional district in Connecticut had changed partisan control since Republican John G. Rowland defeated incumbent Democrat William R. Ratchford in the 5th district in 1984.

Results

1996 Connecticut's 5th congressional district election
Party	Candidate	Votes	%
Democratic	James H. Maloney	105,359	48.97%
A Connecticut Party	James H. Maloney	6,615	3.08%
Total	James H. Maloney	111,974	52.05%
Republican	Gary Franks (incumbent)	98,782	45.92%
Concerned Citizens	Rosita Rodriguez	2,983	1.39%
Libertarian	Walter F. Thiessen Jr.	1,391	0.64%
Total votes		215,130	100.00%
Democratic gain from Republican			

== District 6 ==
1996 Connecticut's 6th congressional district election
- Turnout: 76.59%
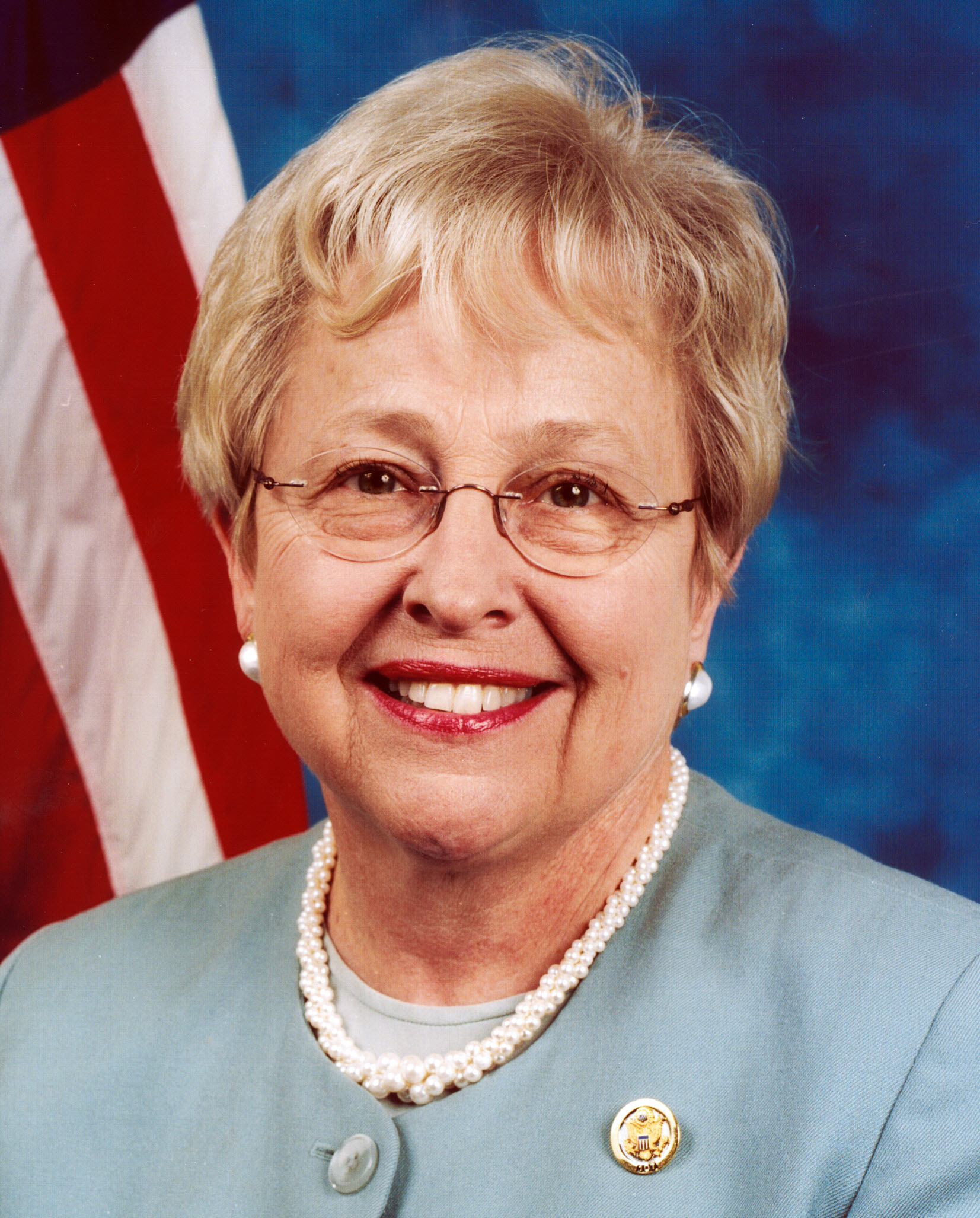

Nominee	Nancy Johnson	Charlotte Koskoff
Party	Republican	Democratic
Alliance		A Connecticut
Popular vote	113,020	111,433
Percentage	49.62%	48.93%
- Municipality results Johnson 50–60% 60–70% Koskoff 40–50% 50–60% 60–70%
U.S. Representative before election
Nancy Johnson
Republican
Elected U.S. Representative
Nancy Johnson
Republican

Incumbent Republican Nancy Johnson, originally elected in 1982, won re-election to an eighth term, narrowly defeating Democratic nominee Charlotte Koskoff with only 49.6% of the vote.

Results

1996 Connecticut's 6th congressional district election
Party	Candidate	Votes	%
Republican	Nancy Johnson (incumbent)	113,020	49.62%
Total	Charlotte Koskoff	111,433	48.93%
Democratic	Charlotte Koskoff	104,225	45.76%
A Connecticut Party	Charlotte Koskoff	7,208	3.17%
Concerned Citizens	Timothy A. Knibbs	3,303	1.45%
Total votes		227,756	100.00%
Republican hold			
