= Connecticut's congressional delegations =

Map of Connecticut's five congressional districts for the United States House of Representatives since 2022

Since Connecticut became a U.S. state in 1788, it has sent congressional delegations to the United States Senate and United States House of Representatives, beginning with the 1st United States Congress in 1789. Each state elects two senators to serve for six years in general elections, with their re-election staggered. Prior to the ratification of the Seventeenth Amendment in 1913, senators were elected by the Connecticut General Assembly. Each state elects varying numbers of members of the House, depending on population, to two-year terms. Connecticut has sent five members to the House in each congressional delegation since the 2000 United States census.

A total of 292 unique individuals have represented Connecticut in Congress; Connecticut has had 57 senators and 259 representatives, and 24 have served in both the House and the Senate. Nine women from Connecticut have served in the House, the first being Clare Booth Luce, while none have served in the Senate. Two African-Americans from Connecticut, Gary Franks and Jahana Hayes, have served in the House.

The current dean, or longest serving member, of the Connecticut delegation is Representative Rosa DeLauro of the 3rd district, who has served in the House since 1991. She is the longest-serving House member in Connecticut history, and the second longest-serving member of Congress from Connecticut, behind Chris Dodd, who served 36 years combined in the House and Senate. Dodd is also Connecticut's longest-serving senator.

== Current delegation ==
Current U.S. senators from Connecticut
Connecticut CPVI (2025): D+8	Class I senator	Class III senator
Connecticut CPVI (2025): D+8	Chris Murphy (Junior senator) (Hartford)	Richard Blumenthal (Senior senator) (Greenwich)
Party	Democratic	Democratic
Incumbent since	January 3, 2013	January 3, 2011

Connecticut's current congressional delegation in the 119th Congress consists of its two senators and its five representatives, all of whom are Democrats. Connecticut has not had a Republican member of Congress for more than a decade, since Republican representative Chris Shays lost his race against Democrat Jim Himes in the state's 4th congressional district in 2008.

The current dean, or longest serving member, of the Connecticut delegation is Representative Rosa DeLauro of the 3rd district, who has served in the House since 1991. She is the longest-serving House member in Connecticut history, and the second longest-serving member of Congress from Connecticut, behind Chris Dodd, who served 36 years in total.

As of March 2025, the Cook Partisan Voting Index, a measure of how strongly partisan congressional districts and states are, rated all districts in Connecticut as leaning Democratic.

Current U.S. representatives from Connecticut
District	Member (Residence)	Party	Incumbent since	CPVI (2025)	District map
1st	John B. Larson (East Hartford)	Democratic	January 3, 1999	D+12	Map of Connecticut's 1st congressional district
2nd	Joe Courtney (Vernon)	Democratic	January 3, 2007	D+4	Map of Connecticut's 2nd congressional district
3rd	Rosa DeLauro (New Haven)	Democratic	January 3, 1991	D+8	Map of Connecticut's 3rd congressional district
4th	Jim Himes (Cos Cob)	Democratic	January 3, 2009	D+13	Map of Connecticut's 4th congressional district
5th	Jahana Hayes (Wolcott)	Democratic	January 3, 2019	D+3	Map of Connecticut's 5th congressional district

== United States Senate ==
Senators Oliver Ellsworth, William S. Johnson, and Roger Sherman were Founding Fathers. Ellsworth helped write the Judiciary Act of 1789, and later served as Chief Justice of the United States Supreme Court. Uriah Tracy served as president pro tempore of the Senate from May 1800 to November 1800, James Hillhouse served as president pro tempore from February 1801 to December 1801, Lafayette Sabine Foster served as president pro tempore from March 1865 to March 1867, and Frank Brandegee served as president pro tempore from May 1912 to March 1913. Senator Orville Platt, along with Nelson Aldrich, William Allison, and John Coit Spooner, formed "The Senate Four", a group of powerful legislators who controlled much of the Senate's operations. Platt also helped draft the Platt Amendment. Senator Joseph Lieberman was the Democratic nominee for vice president in 2000.

Senators are elected every six years depending on their class, with each senator serving a six-year term, and elections for senators occurring every two years, rotating through each class such that each election, around one-third of the seats in the Senate are up for election. Connecticut's senators are elected in classes I and III. Currently, Connecticut is represented in the Senate by Richard Blumenthal and Chris Murphy.

Oliver Ellsworth, Connecticut senator who drafted the Judiciary Act of 1789

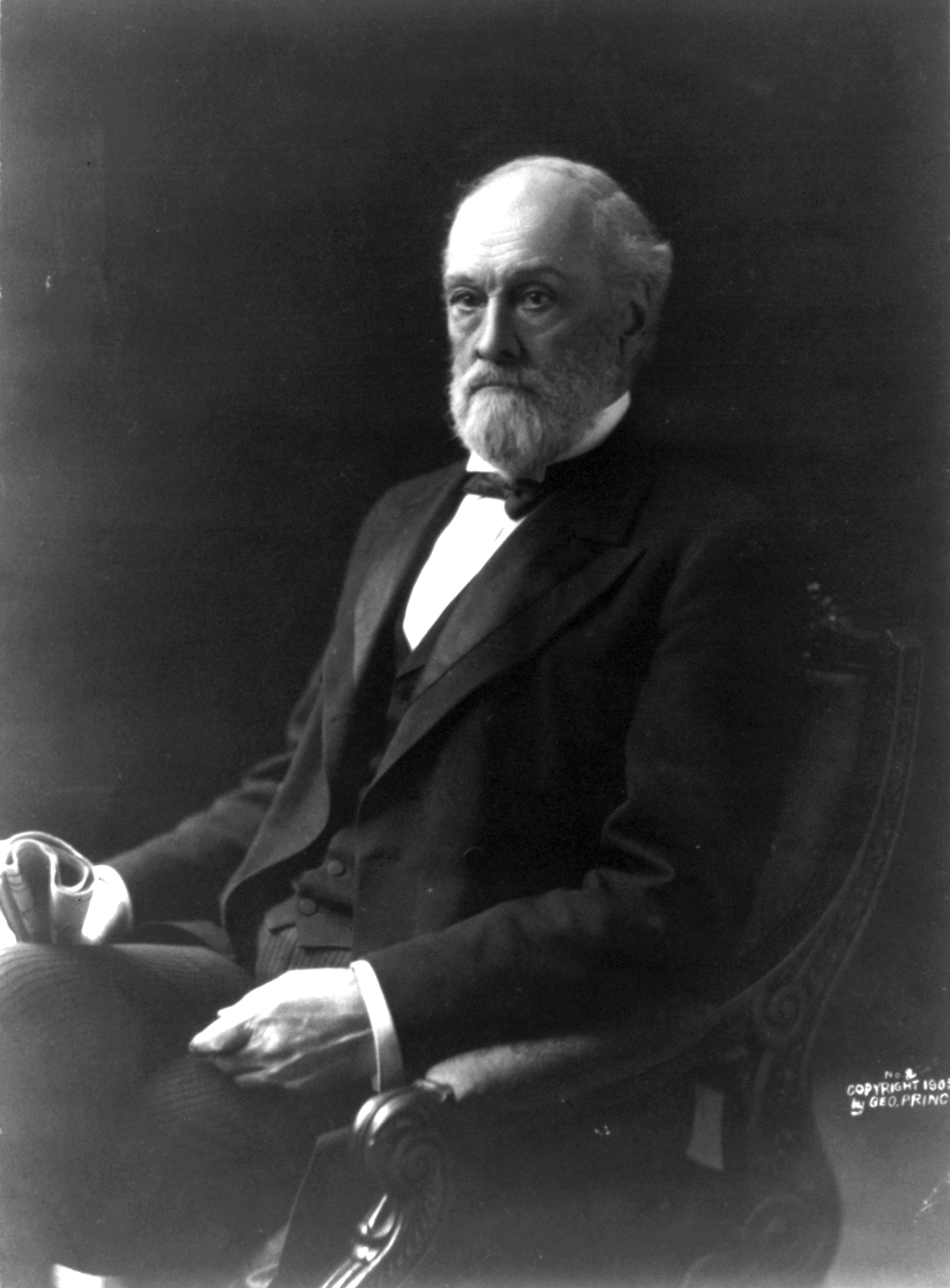
Orville Platt, Connecticut senator who helped draft the Platt Amendment

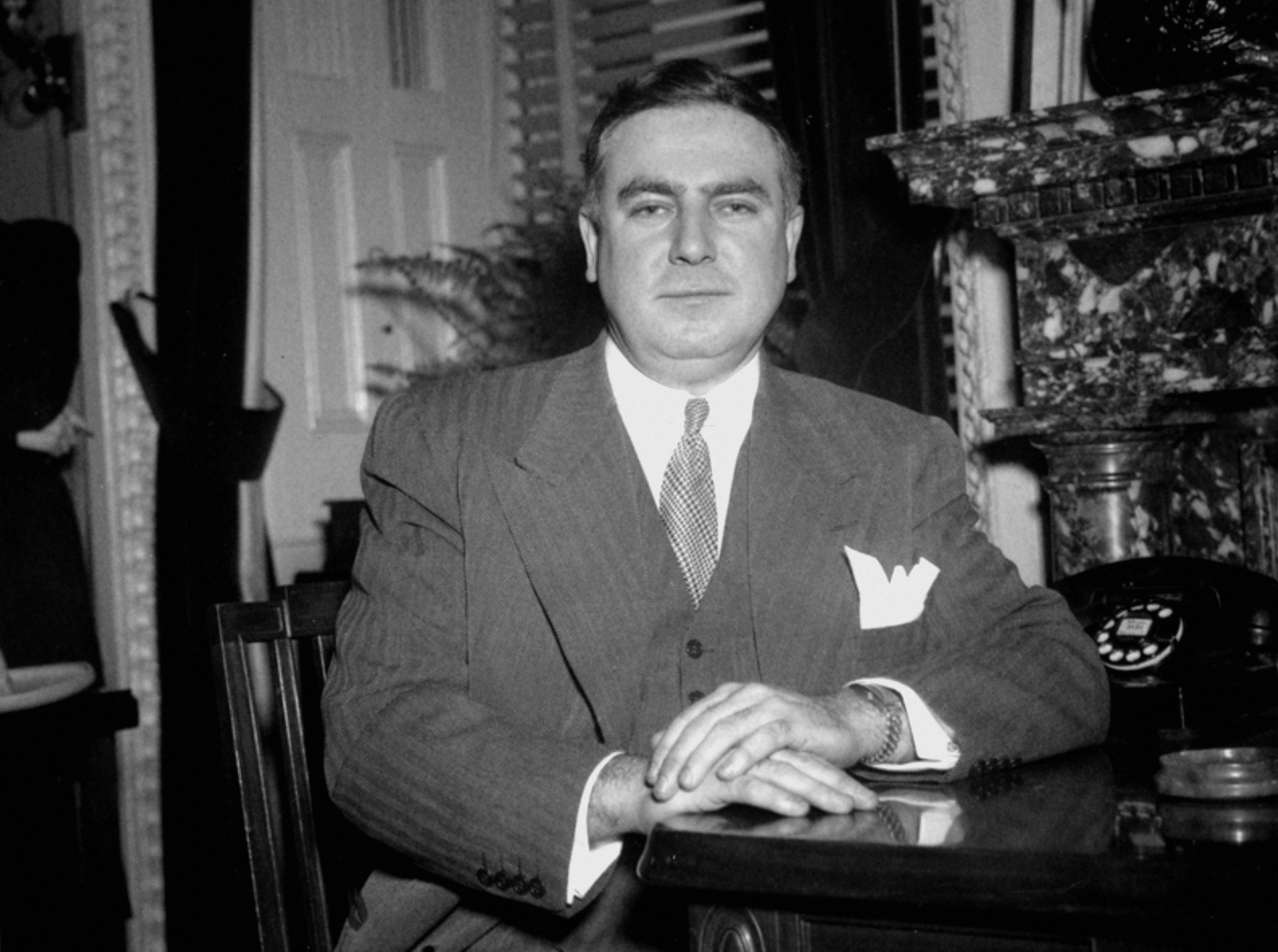
Brien McMahon, Connecticut senator who wrote the Atomic Energy Act of 1946

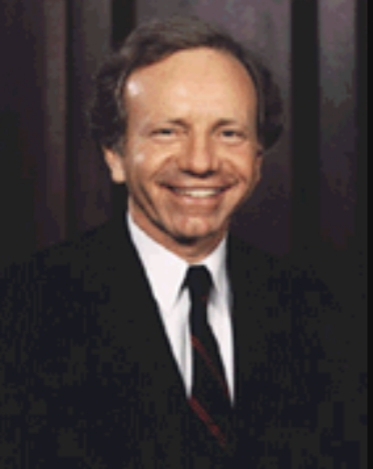
Joe Lieberman, Connecticut senator who was the 2000 Democratic vice presidential nominee, becoming the first Jewish American to be a major party nominee

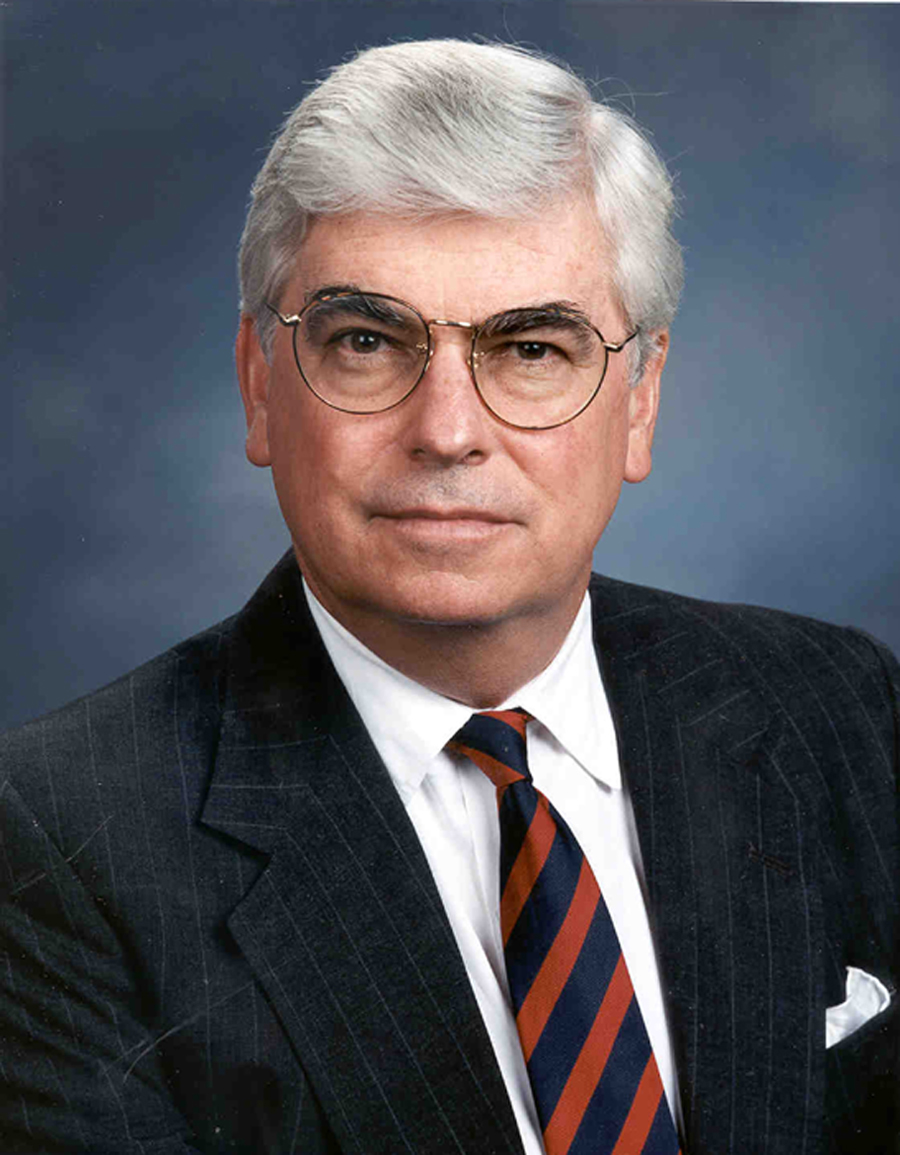
Chris Dodd, Connecticut senator who was a candidate during the 2008 Democratic Party presidential primaries

Connecticut for Lieberman (CfL) Democratic (D) Democratic-Republican (DR) Federalist (F) Free Soil (FS) Jacksonian (J) Liberal Republican (LR) National Republican (NR) Pro-Administration (PA) Republican (R) Whig (W)

Senators from Connecticut
Class I senator	Congress	Class III senator
Oliver Ellsworth (PA)	1st (1789–1791)	William Samuel; Johnson (PA) (Note: Senator Johnson resigned after Congress moved to Philadelphia, as he wished to continue being the president of Columbia University.)
Oliver Ellsworth (PA)	2nd (1791–1793)	William Samuel; Johnson (PA)
Oliver Ellsworth (PA)	2nd (1791–1793)	Roger Sherman (PA) (Note: Senator Sherman died while in office.)
Oliver Ellsworth (PA)	3rd (1793–1795)	Roger Sherman (PA)
Oliver Ellsworth (PA)	3rd (1793–1795)	Stephen Mix Mitchell (PA)
Oliver Ellsworth (F) (Note: Senator Ellsworth resigned from the Senate to become the chief justice of the United States.)	4th (1795–1797)	Jonathan Trumbull Jr. (F) (Note: Senator Trumbull Jr. resigned to serve as the lieutenant governor of Connecticut under Oliver Wolcott.)
James Hillhouse (F) (Note: Senator Hillhouse resigned to manage the Connecticut School Fund.)	4th (1795–1797)	Uriah Tracy (F) (Note: Senator Tracy died while in office.)
James Hillhouse (F)	5th (1797–1799)	Uriah Tracy (F)
James Hillhouse (F)	6th (1799–1801)	Uriah Tracy (F)
James Hillhouse (F)	7th (1801–1803)	Uriah Tracy (F)
James Hillhouse (F)	8th (1803–1805)	Uriah Tracy (F)
James Hillhouse (F)	9th (1805–1807)	Uriah Tracy (F)
James Hillhouse (F)	10th (1807–1809)	Uriah Tracy (F)
James Hillhouse (F)	10th (1807–1809)	Chauncey Goodrich (F) (Note: Senator Goodrich resigned to become the lieutenant governor of Connecticut.)
James Hillhouse (F)	11th (1809–1811)	Chauncey Goodrich (F)
Samuel W. Dana (F)	11th (1809–1811)	Chauncey Goodrich (F)
Samuel W. Dana (F)	12th (1811–1813)	Chauncey Goodrich (F)
Samuel W. Dana (F)	13th (1813–1815)	Chauncey Goodrich (F)
Samuel W. Dana (F)	13th (1813–1815)	David Daggett (F)
Samuel W. Dana (F)	14th (1815–1817)	David Daggett (F)
Samuel W. Dana (F)	15th (1817–1819)	David Daggett (F)
Samuel W. Dana (F)	16th (1819–1821)	James Lanman (DR)
Elijah Boardman (DR) (Note: Senator Boardman died while in office.)	17th (1821–1823)	James Lanman (DR)
Elijah Boardman (DR)	18th (1823–1825)	James Lanman (DR)
Henry W. Edwards (DR)	18th (1823–1825)	James Lanman (DR)
Henry W. Edwards (J)	19th (1825–1827)	Calvin Willey (NR)
Samuel A. Foot (NR)	20th (1827–1829)	Calvin Willey (NR)
Samuel A. Foot (NR)	21st (1829–1831)	Calvin Willey (NR)
Samuel A. Foot (NR)	22nd (1831–1833)	Gideon Tomlinson (NR)
Nathan Smith (NR) (Note: Senator Smith died while in office.)	23rd (1833–1835)	Gideon Tomlinson (NR)
Nathan Smith (NR)	24th (1835–1837)	Gideon Tomlinson (NR)
John Milton Niles (J)	24th (1835–1837)	Gideon Tomlinson (NR)
John Milton Niles (D)	25th (1837–1839)	Perry Smith (D)
Thaddeus Betts (W) (Note: Senator Betts died while in office.)	26th (1839–1841)	Perry Smith (D)
Jabez W. Huntington (W) (Note: Senator Huntington died while in office.)	26th (1839–1841)	Perry Smith (D)
Jabez W. Huntington (W)	27th (1841–1843)	Perry Smith (D)
Jabez W. Huntington (W)	28th (1843–1845)	John Milton Niles (D)
Jabez W. Huntington (W)	29th (1845–1847)	John Milton Niles (D)
Jabez W. Huntington (W)	30th (1847–1849)	John Milton Niles (D)
Roger Sherman; Baldwin (W)	30th (1847–1849)	John Milton Niles (D)
Roger Sherman; Baldwin (W)	31st (1849–1851)	Truman Smith (W) (Note: Senator Truman Smith resigned.)
Isaac Toucey (D)	32nd (1851–1853)	Truman Smith (W)
Isaac Toucey (D)	33rd (1853–1855)	Truman Smith (W)
Isaac Toucey (D)	33rd (1853–1855)	Francis Gillette (FS)
Isaac Toucey (D)	34th (1855–1857)	Lafayette S. Foster (W)
James Dixon (R)	35th (1857–1859)	Lafayette S. Foster (W)
James Dixon (R)	36th (1859–1861)	Lafayette S. Foster (W)
James Dixon (R)	37th (1861–1863)	Lafayette S. Foster (R)
James Dixon (R)	38th (1863–1865)	Lafayette S. Foster (R)
James Dixon (R)	39th (1865–1867)	Lafayette S. Foster (R)
James Dixon (R)	40th (1867–1869)	Orris S. Ferry (R)
William A. Buckingham (R) (Note: Senator Buckingham died while in office.)	41st (1869–1871)	Orris S. Ferry (R)
William A. Buckingham (R)	42nd (1871–1873)	Orris S. Ferry (R)
William A. Buckingham (R)	43rd (1873–1875)	Orris S. Ferry (LR)
William W. Eaton (D)	43rd (1873–1875)	Orris S. Ferry (LR)
William W. Eaton (D)	44th (1875–1877)	Orris S. Ferry (R)
William W. Eaton (D)	44th (1875–1877)	James E. English (D)
William W. Eaton (D)	44th (1875–1877)	William Barnum (D)
William W. Eaton (D)	45th (1877–1879)	William Barnum (D)
William W. Eaton (D)	46th (1879–1881)	Orville H. Platt (R) (Note: Senator Platt died while in office.)
Joseph R. Hawley (R)	47th (1881–1883)	Orville H. Platt (R)
Joseph R. Hawley (R)	48th (1883–1885)	Orville H. Platt (R)
Joseph R. Hawley (R)	49th (1885–1887)	Orville H. Platt (R)
Joseph R. Hawley (R)	50th (1887–1889)	Orville H. Platt (R)
Joseph R. Hawley (R)	51st (1889–1891)	Orville H. Platt (R)
Joseph R. Hawley (R)	52nd (1891–1893)	Orville H. Platt (R)
Joseph R. Hawley (R)	53rd (1893–1895)	Orville H. Platt (R)
Joseph R. Hawley (R)	54th (1895–1897)	Orville H. Platt (R)
Joseph R. Hawley (R)	55th (1897–1899)	Orville H. Platt (R)
Joseph R. Hawley (R)	56th (1899–1901)	Orville H. Platt (R)
Joseph R. Hawley (R)	57th (1901–1903)	Orville H. Platt (R)
Joseph R. Hawley (R)	58th (1903–1905)	Orville H. Platt (R)
Morgan Bulkeley (R)	59th (1905–1907)	Frank B. Brandegee (R) (Note: Senator Brandegee died while in office.)
Morgan Bulkeley (R)	60th (1907–1909)	Frank B. Brandegee (R)
Morgan Bulkeley (R)	61st (1909–1911)	Frank B. Brandegee (R)
George P. McLean (R)	62nd (1911–1913)	Frank B. Brandegee (R)
George P. McLean (R)	63rd (1913–1915)	Frank B. Brandegee (R)
George P. McLean (R)	64th (1915–1917)	Frank B. Brandegee (R)
George P. McLean (R)	65th (1917–1919)	Frank B. Brandegee (R)
George P. McLean (R)	66th (1919–1921)	Frank B. Brandegee (R)
George P. McLean (R)	67th (1921–1923)	Frank B. Brandegee (R)
George P. McLean (R)	68th (1923–1925)	Frank B. Brandegee (R)
George P. McLean (R)	68th (1923–1925)	Hiram Bingham III (R)
George P. McLean (R)	69th (1925–1927)	Hiram Bingham III (R)
George P. McLean (R)	70th (1927–1929)	Hiram Bingham III (R)
Frederic C. Walcott (R)	71st (1929–1931)	Hiram Bingham III (R)
Frederic C. Walcott (R)	72nd (1931–1933)	Hiram Bingham III (R)
Frederic C. Walcott (R)	73rd (1933–1935)	Augustine Lonergan (D)
Francis T. Maloney (D) (Note: Senator Maloney died while in office.)	74th (1935–1937)	Augustine Lonergan (D)
Francis T. Maloney (D)	75th (1937–1939)	Augustine Lonergan (D)
Francis T. Maloney (D)	76th (1939–1941)	John A. Danaher (R)
Francis T. Maloney (D)	77th (1941–1943)	John A. Danaher (R)
Francis T. Maloney (D)	78th (1943–1945)	John A. Danaher (R)
Francis T. Maloney (D)	79th (1945–1947)	Brien McMahon (D) (Note: Senator McMahon died while in office.)
Thomas C. Hart (R)	79th (1945–1947)	Brien McMahon (D)
Raymond E. Baldwin (R) (Note: Senator Baldwin resigned to become a justice of the Connecticut Supreme Court.)	79th (1945–1947)	Brien McMahon (D)
Raymond E. Baldwin (R)	80th (1947–1949)	Brien McMahon (D)
Raymond E. Baldwin (R)	81st (1949–1951)	Brien McMahon (D)
William Benton (D)	81st (1949–1951)	Brien McMahon (D)
William Benton (D)	82nd (1951–1953)	Brien McMahon (D)
William Benton (D)	82nd (1951–1953)	William A. Purtell (R)
William Benton (D)	82nd (1951–1953)	Prescott Bush (R)
William A. Purtell (R)	83rd (1953–1955)	Prescott Bush (R)
William A. Purtell (R)	84th (1955–1957)	Prescott Bush (R)
William A. Purtell (R)	85th (1957–1959)	Prescott Bush (R)
Thomas J. Dodd (D)	86th (1959–1961)	Prescott Bush (R)
Thomas J. Dodd (D)	87th (1961–1963)	Prescott Bush (R)
Thomas J. Dodd (D)	88th (1963–1965)	Abraham Ribicoff (D)
Thomas J. Dodd (D)	89th (1965–1967)	Abraham Ribicoff (D)
Thomas J. Dodd (D)	90th (1967–1969)	Abraham Ribicoff (D)
Thomas J. Dodd (D)	91st (1969–1971)	Abraham Ribicoff (D)
Lowell Weicker (R)	92nd (1971–1973)	Abraham Ribicoff (D)
Lowell Weicker (R)	93rd (1973–1975)	Abraham Ribicoff (D)
Lowell Weicker (R)	94th (1975–1977)	Abraham Ribicoff (D)
Lowell Weicker (R)	95th (1977–1979)	Abraham Ribicoff (D)
Lowell Weicker (R)	96th (1979–1981)	Abraham Ribicoff (D)
Lowell Weicker (R)	97th (1981–1983)	Chris Dodd (D)
Lowell Weicker (R)	98th (1983–1985)	Chris Dodd (D)
Lowell Weicker (R)	99th (1985–1987)	Chris Dodd (D)
Lowell Weicker (R)	100th (1987–1989)	Chris Dodd (D)
Joe Lieberman (D)	101st (1989–1991)	Chris Dodd (D)
Joe Lieberman (D)	102nd (1991–1993)	Chris Dodd (D)
Joe Lieberman (D)	103rd (1993–1995)	Chris Dodd (D)
Joe Lieberman (D)	104th (1995–1997)	Chris Dodd (D)
Joe Lieberman (D)	105th (1997–1999)	Chris Dodd (D)
Joe Lieberman (D)	106th (1999–2001)	Chris Dodd (D)
Joe Lieberman (D)	107th (2001–2003)	Chris Dodd (D)
Joe Lieberman (D)	108th (2003–2005)	Chris Dodd (D)
Joe Lieberman (D)	109th (2005–2007)	Chris Dodd (D)
Joe Lieberman (CfL)	110th (2007–2009)	Chris Dodd (D)
Joe Lieberman (CfL)	111th (2009–2011)	Chris Dodd (D)
Joe Lieberman (CfL)	112th (2011–2013)	Richard Blumenthal (D)
Chris Murphy (D)	113th (2013–2015)	Richard Blumenthal (D)
Chris Murphy (D)	114th (2015–2017)	Richard Blumenthal (D)
Chris Murphy (D)	115th (2017–2019)	Richard Blumenthal (D)
Chris Murphy (D)	116th (2019–2021)	Richard Blumenthal (D)
Chris Murphy (D)	117th (2021–2023)	Richard Blumenthal (D)
Chris Murphy (D)	118th (2023–2025)	Richard Blumenthal (D)
Chris Murphy (D)	119th (2025–2027)	Richard Blumenthal (D)
Chris Murphy (D)	120th (2027–2029)	Richard Blumenthal (D)

== United States House of Representatives ==
John Q. Tilson served as the House Majority Leader for the Republican party from 1925 to 1931. Barbara Kennelly was the first woman to become the Democratic chief deputy whip. Ella T. Grasso later became the first female governor elected in the United States.

From 1789 to 1837, representatives from Connecticut were elected from Connecticut's at-large congressional district, which was subsequently replaced with Connecticut's congressional districts. Connecticut has sent five members to the House in each congressional delegation since the 2000 United States census. One member of the House of Representatives is sent from each district via a popular vote. Districts are redrawn every ten years, after data from the US Census is collected.

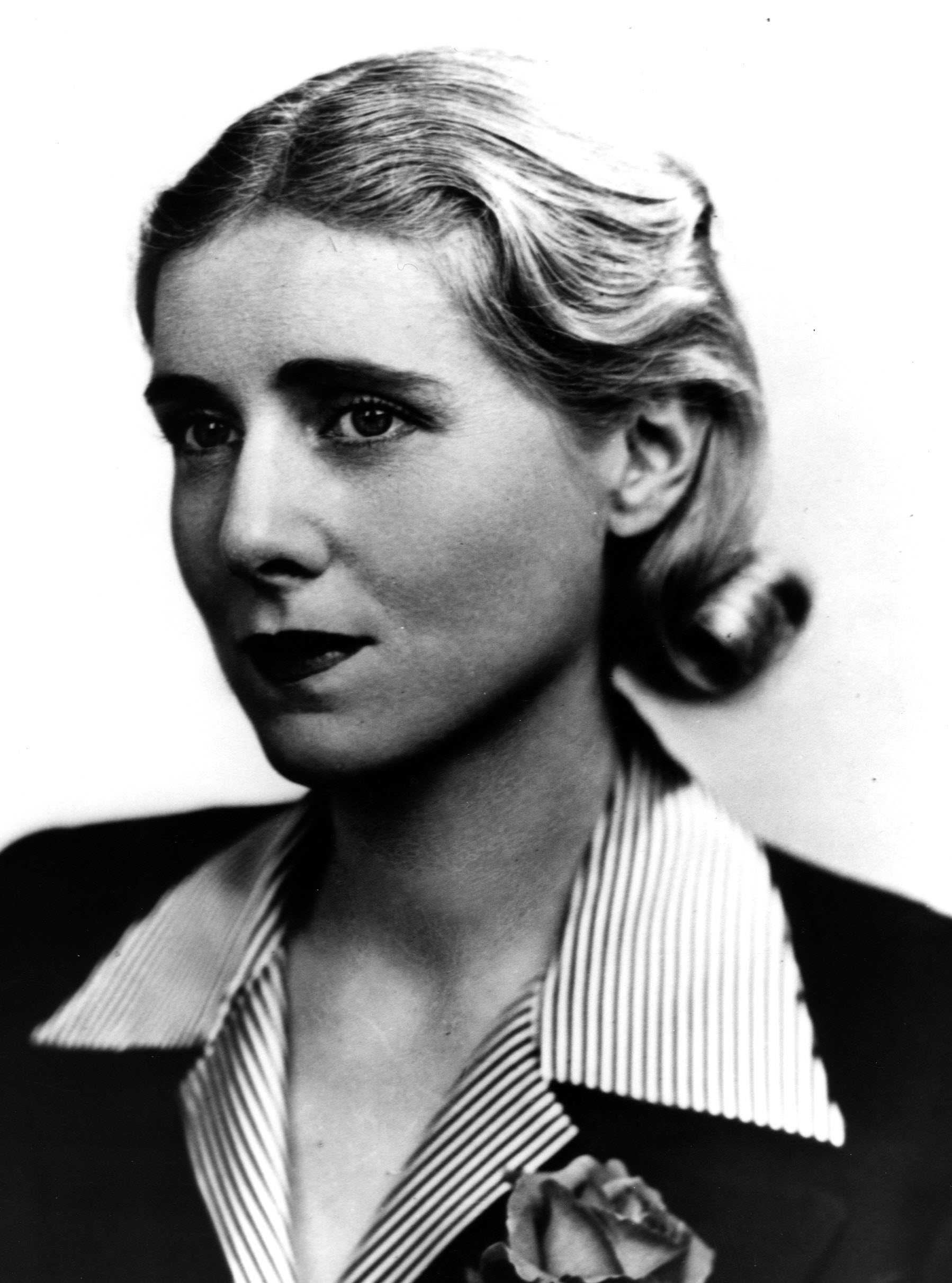
Clare Boothe Luce, the first female member of the House from Connecticut

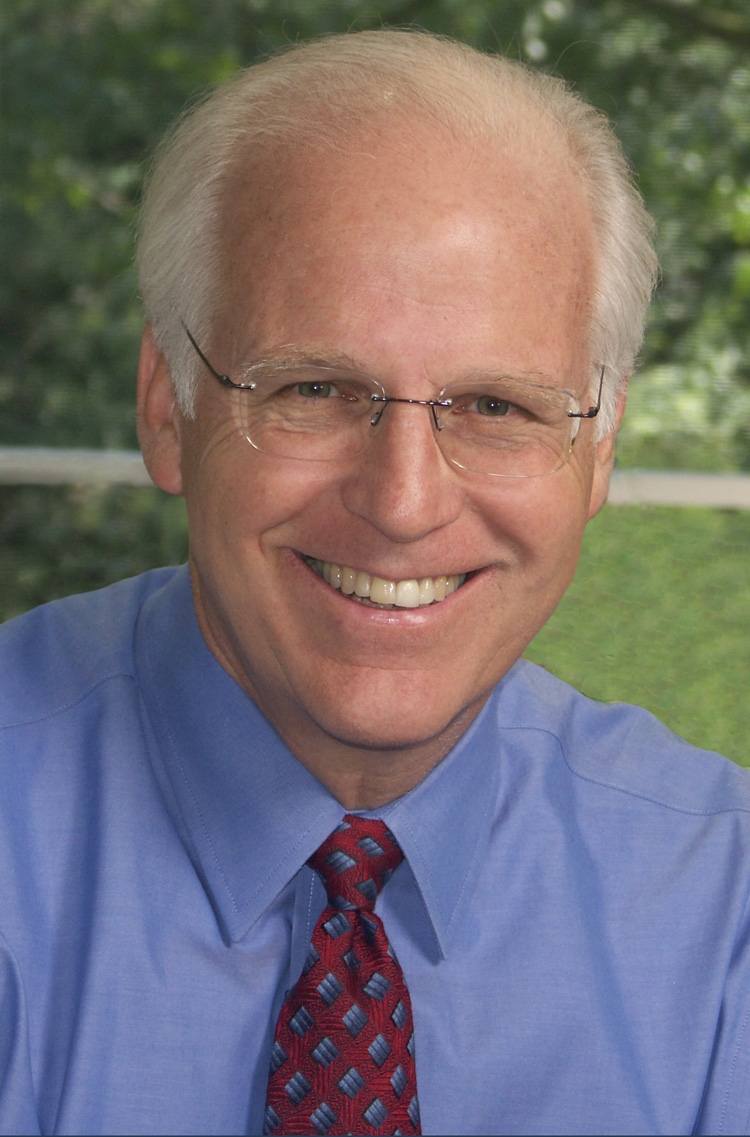
Chris Shays, the last Republican to have represented Connecticut in Congress

=== 1789–1793: 5 seats ===
Connecticut was granted five seats in the House until the first US census in 1790.

Pro-Administration (PA)

Members of the House of Representatives from Connecticut from 1789 to 1793
Congress	Elected statewide on a general ticket from Connecticut's at-large district				
Congress	1st seat	2nd seat	3rd seat	4th seat	5th seat
1st (1789–1791)	Benjamin Huntington (PA)	Roger Sherman (PA)	Jonathan; Sturges (PA)	Jonathan; Trumbull Jr. (PA)	Jeremiah; Wadsworth (PA)
2nd (1791–1793)	James Hillhouse (PA)	Amasa Learned (PA)	Jonathan; Sturges (PA)	Jonathan; Trumbull Jr. (PA)	Jeremiah; Wadsworth (PA)

=== 1793–1823: 7 seats ===
Following the 1790 census, Connecticut was apportioned seven seats.

Democratic-Republican (DR) Federalist (F) Pro-Administration (PA)

Members of the House of Representatives from Connecticut from 1793 to 1823
Congress	Elected statewide on a general ticket from Connecticut's at-large district						
Congress	1st seat	2nd seat	3rd seat	4th seat	5th seat	6th seat	7th seat
3rd (1793–1795)	James Hillhouse (PA)	Amasa Learned (PA)	Joshua Coit (PA)	Jonathan; Trumbull Jr. (PA)	Jeremiah; Wadsworth (PA)	Zephaniah Swift (PA)	Uriah Tracy (PA)
4th (1795–1797)	James Hillhouse (F)	Chauncey; Goodrich (F)	Joshua Coit (F) (Note: Representative Coit died in office.)	Roger Griswold (F) (Note: Representative Griswold resigned.)	Nathaniel Smith (F)	Zephaniah Swift (F)	Uriah Tracy (F) (Note: Representative Tracy resigned to become a member of the Senate.)
4th (1795–1797)	James Davenport (F) (Note: Representative James Davenport died while in office.)	Chauncey; Goodrich (F)	Joshua Coit (F)	Roger Griswold (F)	Nathaniel Smith (F)	Zephaniah Swift (F)	Samuel W. Dana (F) (Note: Representative Dana resigned to become a member of the Senate.)
5th (1797–1799)	James Davenport (F)	Chauncey; Goodrich (F)	Joshua Coit (F)	Roger Griswold (F)	Nathaniel Smith (F)	John Allen (F)	Samuel W. Dana (F)
5th (1797–1799)	William Edmond (F)	Chauncey; Goodrich (F)	Jonathan Brace (F) (Note: Representative Brace resigned.)	Roger Griswold (F)	Nathaniel Smith (F)	John Allen (F)	Samuel W. Dana (F)
6th (1799–1801)	William Edmond (F)	Chauncey; Goodrich (F)	Jonathan Brace (F)	Roger Griswold (F)	Elizur Goodrich (F) (Note: Goldrich resigned to become the customs collector of New Haven, which John Adams had promoted him to; he was later removed by Thomas Jefferson.)	John Davenport (F)	Samuel W. Dana (F)
6th (1799–1801)	William Edmond (F)	Chauncey; Goodrich (F)	John Cotton; Smith (F) (Note: Representative John Cotton Smith resigned.)	Roger Griswold (F)	Elizur Goodrich (F)	John Davenport (F)	Samuel W. Dana (F)
7th (1801–1803)	Benjamin Tallmadge (F)	Calvin Goddard (F) (Note: Representative Goddard resigned.)	John Cotton; Smith (F)	Roger Griswold (F)	Elias Perkins (F)	John Davenport (F)	Samuel W. Dana (F)
8th (1803–1805)	Benjamin Tallmadge (F)	Calvin Goddard (F)	John Cotton; Smith (F)	Roger Griswold (F)	Simeon Baldwin (F)	John Davenport (F)	Samuel W. Dana (F)
9th (1805–1807)	Benjamin Tallmadge (F)	Calvin Goddard (F)	John Cotton; Smith (F)	Roger Griswold (F)	Jonathan O. Moseley (F)	John Davenport (F)	Samuel W. Dana (F)
9th (1805–1807)	Benjamin Tallmadge (F)	Theodore Dwight (F)	Timothy Pitkin (F)	Lewis B. Sturges (F)	Jonathan O. Moseley (F)	John Davenport (F)	Samuel W. Dana (F)
10th (1807–1809)	Benjamin Tallmadge (F)	Epaphroditus; Champion (F)	Timothy Pitkin (F)	Lewis B. Sturges (F)	Jonathan O. Moseley (F)	John Davenport (F)	Samuel W. Dana (F)
11th (1809–1811)	Benjamin Tallmadge (F)	Epaphroditus; Champion (F)	Timothy Pitkin (F)	Lewis B. Sturges (F)	Jonathan O. Moseley (F)	John Davenport (F)	Samuel W. Dana (F)
11th (1809–1811)	Benjamin Tallmadge (F)	Epaphroditus; Champion (F)	Timothy Pitkin (F)	Lewis B. Sturges (F)	Jonathan O. Moseley (F)	John Davenport (F)	Ebenezer Huntington (F)
12th (1811–1813)	Benjamin Tallmadge (F)	Epaphroditus; Champion (F)	Timothy Pitkin (F)	Lewis B. Sturges (F)	Jonathan O. Moseley (F)	John Davenport (F)	Lyman Law (F)
13th (1813–1815)	Benjamin Tallmadge (F)	Epaphroditus; Champion (F)	Timothy Pitkin (F)	Lewis B. Sturges (F)	Jonathan O. Moseley (F)	John Davenport (F)	Lyman Law (F)
14th (1815–1817)	Benjamin Tallmadge (F)	Epaphroditus; Champion (F)	Timothy Pitkin (F)	Lewis B. Sturges (F)	Jonathan O. Moseley (F)	John Davenport (F)	Lyman Law (F)
15th (1817–1819)	Thomas Scott; Williams (F)	Uriel Holmes (F) (Note: Representatives Holmes resigned.)	Timothy Pitkin (F)	Samuel B. Sherwood (F)	Jonathan O. Moseley (F)	Nathaniel Terry (F)	Ebenezer Huntington (F)
15th (1817–1819)	Thomas Scott; Williams (F)	Sylvester Gilbert (DR)	Timothy Pitkin (F)	Samuel B. Sherwood (F)	Jonathan O. Moseley (F)	Nathaniel Terry (F)	Ebenezer Huntington (F)
16th (1819–1821)	Gideon Tomlinson (DR)	James Stevens (DR)	Samuel A. Foot (DR)	John Russ (DR)	Jonathan O. Moseley (DR)	Elisha Phelps (DR)	Henry W. Edwards (DR)
17th (1821–1823)	Gideon Tomlinson (DR)	Daniel Burrows (DR)	Ansel Sterling (DR)	John Russ (DR)	Noyes Barber (DR)	Ebenezer Stoddard (DR)	Henry W. Edwards (DR)

=== 1823–1843: 6 seats ===
Following the 1820 census, Connecticut was apportioned six seats.

Democratic (D) Democratic-Republican (DR) Jacksonian (J) National Republican (NR) Whig (W)

Members of the House of Representatives from Connecticut from 1823 to 1843
Congress	Elected statewide on a general ticket from Connecticut's at-large district					
Congress	1st seat	2nd seat	3rd seat	4th seat	5th seat	6th seat
18th (1823–1825)	Gideon Tomlinson (DR) (Note: Supported the Adams-Clay ticket in the 1824 United States presidential election.)	Lemuel Whitman (DR)	Ansel Sterling (DR)	Samuel A. Foot (DR)	Noyes Barber (DR)	Ebenezer Stoddard (DR)
19th (1825–1827)	Gideon Tomlinson (NR)	John Baldwin (NR)	Ralph I. Ingersoll (NR)	Orange Merwin (NR)	Noyes Barber (NR)	Elisha Phelps (NR)
20th (1827–1829)	David Plant (NR)	John Baldwin (NR)	Ralph I. Ingersoll (NR)	Orange Merwin (NR)	Noyes Barber (NR)	Elisha Phelps (NR)
21st (1829–1831)	William W. Ellsworth (NR) (Note: Representative Ellsworth resigned.)	Jabez W. Huntington (NR)	Ralph I. Ingersoll (NR)	Ebenezer Young (NR)	Noyes Barber (NR)	William L. Storrs (NR) (Note: Representative Storrs resigned to become an associate judge of the Connecticut Supreme Court.)
22nd (1831–1833)	William W. Ellsworth (NR)	Jabez W. Huntington (NR)	Ralph I. Ingersoll (NR)	Ebenezer Young (NR)	Noyes Barber (NR)	William L. Storrs (NR)
23rd (1833–1835)	William W. Ellsworth (NR)	Jabez W. Huntington (NR)	Samuel A. Foot (NR) (Note: Representative Foot resigned to become the governor of Connecticut.)	Ebenezer Young (NR)	Noyes Barber (NR)	Samuel Tweedy (NR)
23rd (1833–1835)	Joseph Trumbull (NR)	Phineas Miner (NR)	Ebenezer Jackson Jr. (NR)	Ebenezer Young (NR)	Noyes Barber (NR)	Samuel Tweedy (NR)
24th (1835–1837)	Isaac Toucey (J)	Samuel Ingham (J)	Elisha Haley (J)	Zalmon Wildman (J) (Note: Representative Wildman died while in office.)	Lancelot Phelps (J)	Andrew T. Judson (J) (Note: Representative Judson resigned to become a justice of the United States District Court for the District of Connecticut.)
24th (1835–1837)	Isaac Toucey (J)	Samuel Ingham (J)	Elisha Haley (J)	Thomas T. Whittlesey (J)	Lancelot Phelps (J)	Orrin Holt (J)
Congress	District					
Congress	1st	2nd	3rd	4th	5th	6th
25th (1837–1839)	Isaac Toucey (D)	Samuel Ingham (D)	Elisha Haley (D)	Thomas T. Whittlesey (D)	Lancelot Phelps (D)	Orrin Holt (D)
26th (1839–1841)	Joseph Trumbull (W)	William L. Storrs (W)	Thomas W. Williams (W)	Thomas B. Osborne (W)	Truman Smith (W)	John H. Brockway (W)
26th (1839–1841)	Joseph Trumbull (W)	William W. Boardman (W)	Thomas W. Williams (W)	Thomas B. Osborne (W)	Truman Smith (W)	John H. Brockway (W)
27th (1841–1843)	Joseph Trumbull (W)	William W. Boardman (W)	Thomas W. Williams (W)	Thomas B. Osborne (W)	Truman Smith (W)	John H. Brockway (W)

=== 1843–1903: 4 seats ===
Following the 1840 census, Connecticut was apportioned four seats.

Democratic (D) Free Soil (FS) Know Nothing (KN) Republican (R) Whig (W)

Members of the House of Representatives from Connecticut from 1843 to 1903
Congress	1st district	2nd district	3rd district	4th district
28th (1843–1845)	Thomas H. Seymour (D)	John Stewart (D)	George S. Catlin (D)	Samuel Simons (D)
29th (1845–1847)	James Dixon (W)	Samuel Dickinson; Hubbard (W)	John A. Rockwell (W)	Truman Smith (W)
30th (1847–1849)	James Dixon (W)	Samuel Dickinson; Hubbard (W)	John A. Rockwell (W)	Truman Smith (W)
31st (1849–1851)	Loren P. Waldo (D)	Walter Booth (FS)	Chauncey Fitch; Cleveland (D)	Thomas B. Butler (W)
32nd (1851–1853)	Charles Chapman (W)	Colin M. Ingersoll (D)	Chauncey Fitch; Cleveland (D)	Origen S. Seymour (D)
33rd (1853–1855)	James T. Pratt (D)	Colin M. Ingersoll (D)	Nathan Belcher (D)	Origen S. Seymour (D)
34th (1855–1857)	Ezra Clark Jr. (KN)	John Woodruff (KN)	Sidney Dean (KN)	William W. Welch (KN)
35th (1857–1859)	Ezra Clark Jr. (R)	Samuel Arnold (D)	Sidney Dean (R)	William D. Bishop (D)
36th (1859–1861)	Dwight Loomis (R)	John Woodruff (R)	Alfred A. Burnham (R)	Orris S. Ferry (R) (Note: Representative Ferry died while in office.)
37th (1861–1863)	Dwight Loomis (R)	James E. English (D)	Alfred A. Burnham (R)	George Catlin Woodruff (D)
38th (1863–1865)	Henry C. Deming (R)	James E. English (D)	Augustus Brandegee (R)	John Henry Hubbard (R)
39th (1865–1867)	Henry C. Deming (R)	Samuel L. Warner (R)	Augustus Brandegee (R)	John Henry Hubbard (R)
40th (1867–1869)	Richard D. Hubbard (D)	Julius Hotchkiss (D)	Henry H. Starkweather (R) (Note: Representative Starkweather died while in office.)	William Barnum (D) (Note: Representative Barnum resigned to become a member of the Senate.)
41st (1869–1871)	Julius L. Strong (R) (Note: Representative Strong died while in office.)	Stephen Kellogg (R)	Henry H. Starkweather (R)	William Barnum (D)
42nd (1871–1873)	Julius L. Strong (R)	Stephen Kellogg (R)	Henry H. Starkweather (R)	William Barnum (D)
42nd (1871–1873)	Joseph R. Hawley (R)	Stephen Kellogg (R)	Henry H. Starkweather (R)	William Barnum (D)
43rd (1873–1875)	Joseph R. Hawley (R)	Stephen Kellogg (R)	Henry H. Starkweather (R)	William Barnum (D)
44th (1875–1877)	George M. Landers (D)	James Phelps (D)	Henry H. Starkweather (R)	William Barnum (D)
44th (1875–1877)	George M. Landers (D)	James Phelps (D)	John T. Wait (R)	Levi Warner (D)
45th (1877–1879)	George M. Landers (D)	James Phelps (D)	John T. Wait (R)	Levi Warner (D)
46th (1879–1881)	Joseph R. Hawley (R)	James Phelps (D)	John T. Wait (R)	Frederick Miles (R)
47th (1881–1883)	John R. Buck (R)	James Phelps (D)	John T. Wait (R)	Frederick Miles (R)
48th (1883–1885)	William W. Eaton (D)	Charles L. Mitchell (D)	John T. Wait (R)	Edward W. Seymour (D)
49th (1885–1887)	John R. Buck (R)	Charles L. Mitchell (D)	John T. Wait (R)	Edward W. Seymour (D)
50th (1887–1889)	Robert J. Vance (D)	Carlos French (D)	Charles Addison; Russell (R) (Note: Representative Russell died while in office.)	Miles T. Granger (D)
51st (1889–1891)	William E. Simonds (R)	Washington F. Willcox (D)	Charles Addison; Russell (R)	Frederick Miles (R)
52nd (1891–1893)	Lewis Sperry (D)	Washington F. Willcox (D)	Charles Addison; Russell (R)	Robert E. De Forest (D)
53rd (1893–1895)	Lewis Sperry (D)	James P. Pigott (D)	Charles Addison; Russell (R)	Robert E. De Forest (D)
54th (1895–1897)	E. Stevens Henry (R)	Nehemiah D. Sperry (R)	Charles Addison; Russell (R)	Ebenezer J. Hill (R) (Note: Representative Hill died while in office.)
55th (1897–1899)	E. Stevens Henry (R)	Nehemiah D. Sperry (R)	Charles Addison; Russell (R)	Ebenezer J. Hill (R)
56th (1899–1901)	E. Stevens Henry (R)	Nehemiah D. Sperry (R)	Charles Addison; Russell (R)	Ebenezer J. Hill (R)
57th (1901–1903)	E. Stevens Henry (R)	Nehemiah D. Sperry (R)	Charles Addison; Russell (R)	Ebenezer J. Hill (R)
57th (1901–1903)	E. Stevens Henry (R)	Nehemiah D. Sperry (R)	Frank B. Brandegee (R)	Ebenezer J. Hill (R)

=== 1903–1933: 5 seats ===
Following the 1900 census, Connecticut was apportioned five seats. The fifth seat was established at-large from 1901 to 1911, when it was converted into a fifth district via a redistricting plan.

Democratic (D) Republican (R)

Members of the House of Representatives from Connecticut from 1903 to 1933
Congress	1st district	2nd district	3rd district	4th district	At-large
58th (1903–1905)	E. Stevens Henry (R)	Nehemiah D. Sperry (R)	Frank B. Brandegee (R) (Note: Representative Brandegee resigned to become a member of the Senate.)	Ebenezer J. Hill (R)	George L. Lilley (R) (Note: Representative Lilley resigned to become the governor of Connecticut.)
59th (1905–1907)	E. Stevens Henry (R)	Nehemiah D. Sperry (R)	Frank B. Brandegee (R)	Ebenezer J. Hill (R)	George L. Lilley (R)
59th (1905–1907)	E. Stevens Henry (R)	Nehemiah D. Sperry (R)	Edwin W. Higgins (R)	Ebenezer J. Hill (R)	George L. Lilley (R)
60th (1907–1909)	E. Stevens Henry (R)	Nehemiah D. Sperry (R)	Edwin W. Higgins (R)	Ebenezer J. Hill (R)	George L. Lilley (R)
61st (1909–1911)	E. Stevens Henry (R)	Nehemiah D. Sperry (R)	Edwin W. Higgins (R)	Ebenezer J. Hill (R)	John Q. Tilson (R)
62nd (1911–1913)	E. Stevens Henry (R)	Thomas L. Reilly (D)	Edwin W. Higgins (R)	Ebenezer J. Hill (R)	John Q. Tilson (R)
63rd (1913–1915)	Augustine Lonergan (D)	Bryan F. Mahan (D)	Thomas L. Reilly (D)	Jeremiah; Donovan (D)	5th district
63rd (1913–1915)	Augustine Lonergan (D)	Bryan F. Mahan (D)	Thomas L. Reilly (D)	Jeremiah; Donovan (D)	William Kennedy (D)
64th (1915–1917)	P. Davis Oakey (R)	Richard P. Freeman (R)	John Q. Tilson (R) (Note: Representative Tilson resigned.)	Ebenezer J. Hill (R)	James P. Glynn (R)
65th (1917–1919)	Augustine Lonergan (D)	Richard P. Freeman (R)	John Q. Tilson (R)	Ebenezer J. Hill (R)	James P. Glynn (R)
65th (1917–1919)	Augustine Lonergan (D)	Richard P. Freeman (R)	John Q. Tilson (R)	Schuyler Merritt (R)	James P. Glynn (R)
66th (1919–1921)	Augustine Lonergan (D)	Richard P. Freeman (R)	John Q. Tilson (R)	Schuyler Merritt (R)	James P. Glynn (R)
67th (1921–1923)	E. Hart Fenn (R)	Richard P. Freeman (R)	John Q. Tilson (R)	Schuyler Merritt (R)	James P. Glynn (R)
68th (1923–1925)	E. Hart Fenn (R)	Richard P. Freeman (R)	John Q. Tilson (R)	Schuyler Merritt (R)	Patrick B. O'Sullivan (D)
69th (1925–1927)	E. Hart Fenn (R)	Richard P. Freeman (R)	John Q. Tilson (R)	Schuyler Merritt (R)	James P. Glynn (R) (Note: Representative Glynn died while in office.)
70th (1927–1929)	E. Hart Fenn (R)	Richard P. Freeman (R)	John Q. Tilson (R)	Schuyler Merritt (R)	James P. Glynn (R)
71st (1929–1931)	E. Hart Fenn (R)	Richard P. Freeman (R)	John Q. Tilson (R)	Schuyler Merritt (R)	James P. Glynn (R)
71st (1929–1931)	E. Hart Fenn (R)	Richard P. Freeman (R)	John Q. Tilson (R)	Schuyler Merritt (R)	Edward W. Goss (R)
72nd (1931–1933)	Augustine Lonergan (D)	Richard P. Freeman (R)	John Q. Tilson (R)	William L. Tierney (D)	Edward W. Goss (R)

=== 1933–2003: 6 seats ===
Following the 1930 census, Connecticut was apportioned six seats. The sixth seat was established at-large from 1931 to 1964, when it was converted into a sixth district via a reapportioning plan.

Democratic (D) Republican (R)

Members of the House of Representatives from Connecticut from 1933 to 2003
Congress	District					
Congress	1st	2nd	3rd	4th	5th	At-large
73rd (1933–1935)	Herman Kopplemann (D)	William L. Higgins (R)	Francis T. Maloney (D)	Schuyler Merritt (R)	Edward W. Goss (R)	Charles Montague; Bakewell (R)
74th (1935–1937)	Herman Kopplemann (D)	William L. Higgins (R)	James A. Shanley (D)	Schuyler Merritt (R)	J. Joseph; Smith (D) (Note: Representative Smith resigned to become a judge of the United States District Court for the District of Connecticut.)	William M. Citron (D)
75th (1937–1939)	Herman Kopplemann (D)	William J. Fitzgerald (D)	James A. Shanley (D)	Alfred N. Phillips (D)	J. Joseph; Smith (D)	William M. Citron (D)
76th (1939–1941)	William J. Miller (R)	Thomas R. Ball (R)	James A. Shanley (D)	Albert E. Austin (R)	J. Joseph; Smith (D)	B. J. Monkiewicz (R)
77th (1941–1943)	Herman Kopplemann (D)	William J. Fitzgerald (D)	James A. Shanley (D)	Le Roy D. Downs (D)	J. Joseph; Smith (D)	Lucien J. Maciora (D)
77th (1941–1943)	Herman Kopplemann (D)	William J. Fitzgerald (D)	James A. Shanley (D)	Le Roy D. Downs (D)	Joseph E. Talbot (R)	Lucien J. Maciora (D)
78th (1943–1945)	William J. Miller (R)	John D. McWilliams (R)	Ranulf Compton (R)	Clare Boothe; Luce (R)	Joseph E. Talbot (R)	B. J. Monkiewicz (R)
79th (1945–1947)	Herman Kopplemann (D)	Chase Woodhouse (D)	James P. Geelan (D)	Clare Boothe; Luce (R)	Joseph E. Talbot (R)	Joseph F. Ryter (D)
80th (1947–1949)	William J. Miller (R)	Horace Seely-Brown (R)	Ellsworth Foote (R)	John Davis; Lodge (R)	James T. Patterson (R)	Antoni Sadlak (R)
81st (1949–1951)	Abraham Ribicoff (D)	Chase Woodhouse (D)	John A. McGuire (D)	John Davis; Lodge (R)	James T. Patterson (R)	Antoni Sadlak (R)
82nd (1951–1953)	Abraham Ribicoff (D)	Horace Seely-Brown (R)	John A. McGuire (D)	Albert P. Morano (R)	James T. Patterson (R)	Antoni Sadlak (R)
83rd (1953–1955)	Thomas J. Dodd (D)	Horace Seely-Brown (R)	Albert W. Cretella (R)	Albert P. Morano (R)	James T. Patterson (R)	Antoni Sadlak (R)
84th (1955–1957)	Thomas J. Dodd (D)	Horace Seely-Brown (R)	Albert W. Cretella (R)	Albert P. Morano (R)	James T. Patterson (R)	Antoni Sadlak (R)
85th (1957–1959)	Edwin H. May Jr. (R)	Horace Seely-Brown (R)	Albert W. Cretella (R)	Albert P. Morano (R)	James T. Patterson (R)	Antoni Sadlak (R)
86th (1959–1961)	Emilio Daddario (D)	Chester B. Bowles (D)	Robert Giaimo (D)	Donald J. Irwin (D)	John S. Monagan (D)	Frank Kowalski (D)
87th (1961–1963)	Emilio Daddario (D)	Horace Seely-Brown (R)	Robert Giaimo (D)	Abner W. Sibal (R)	John S. Monagan (D)	Frank Kowalski (D)
88th (1963–1965)	Emilio Daddario (D)	William St. Onge (D) (Note: Representative St. Onge died while in office.)	Robert Giaimo (D)	Abner W. Sibal (R)	John S. Monagan (D)	Bernard Grabowski (D)
89th (1965–1967)	Emilio Daddario (D)	William St. Onge (D)	Robert Giaimo (D)	Donald J. Irwin (D)	John S. Monagan (D)	6th district
89th (1965–1967)	Emilio Daddario (D)	William St. Onge (D)	Robert Giaimo (D)	Donald J. Irwin (D)	John S. Monagan (D)	Bernard Grabowski (D)
90th (1967–1969)	Emilio Daddario (D)	William St. Onge (D)	Robert Giaimo (D)	Donald J. Irwin (D)	John S. Monagan (D)	Thomas Meskill (R)
91st (1969–1971)	Emilio Daddario (D)	William St. Onge (D)	Robert Giaimo (D)	Lowell Weicker (R)	John S. Monagan (D)	Thomas Meskill (R)
91st (1969–1971)	Emilio Daddario (D)	Robert H. Steele (R)	Robert Giaimo (D)	Lowell Weicker (R)	John S. Monagan (D)	Thomas Meskill (R)
92nd (1971–1973)	William R. Cotter (D) (Note: Representative Cotter died while in office.)	Robert H. Steele (R)	Robert Giaimo (D)	Stewart; McKinney (R) (Note: Representative McKinney died while in office.)	John S. Monagan (D)	Ella Grasso (D)
93rd (1973–1975)	William R. Cotter (D)	Robert H. Steele (R)	Robert Giaimo (D)	Stewart; McKinney (R)	Ronald A. Sarasin (R)	Ella Grasso (D)
94th (1975–1977)	William R. Cotter (D)	Chris Dodd (D)	Robert Giaimo (D)	Stewart; McKinney (R)	Ronald A. Sarasin (R)	Toby Moffett (D)
95th (1977–1979)	William R. Cotter (D)	Chris Dodd (D)	Robert Giaimo (D)	Stewart; McKinney (R)	Ronald A. Sarasin (R)	Toby Moffett (D)
96th (1979–1981)	William R. Cotter (D)	Chris Dodd (D)	Robert Giaimo (D)	Stewart; McKinney (R)	William R. Ratchford (D)	Toby Moffett (D)
97th (1981–1983)	William R. Cotter (D)	Sam Gejdenson (D)	Larry DeNardis (R)	Stewart; McKinney (R)	William R. Ratchford (D)	Toby Moffett (D)
97th (1981–1983)	Barbara Kennelly (D)	Sam Gejdenson (D)	Larry DeNardis (R)	Stewart; McKinney (R)	William R. Ratchford (D)	Toby Moffett (D)
98th (1983–1985)	Barbara Kennelly (D)	Sam Gejdenson (D)	Bruce Morrison (D)	Stewart; McKinney (R)	William R. Ratchford (D)	Nancy Johnson (R)
99th (1985–1987)	Barbara Kennelly (D)	Sam Gejdenson (D)	Bruce Morrison (D)	Stewart; McKinney (R)	John G. Rowland (R)	Nancy Johnson (R)
100th (1987–1989)	Barbara Kennelly (D)	Sam Gejdenson (D)	Bruce Morrison (D)	Stewart; McKinney (R)	John G. Rowland (R)	Nancy Johnson (R)
100th (1987–1989)	Barbara Kennelly (D)	Sam Gejdenson (D)	Bruce Morrison (D)	Chris Shays (R)	John G. Rowland (R)	Nancy Johnson (R)
101st (1989–1991)	Barbara Kennelly (D)	Sam Gejdenson (D)	Bruce Morrison (D)	Chris Shays (R)	John G. Rowland (R)	Nancy Johnson (R)
102nd (1991–1993)	Barbara Kennelly (D)	Sam Gejdenson (D)	Rosa DeLauro (D)	Chris Shays (R)	Gary Franks (R)	Nancy Johnson (R)
103rd (1993–1995)	Barbara Kennelly (D)	Sam Gejdenson (D)	Rosa DeLauro (D)	Chris Shays (R)	Gary Franks (R)	Nancy Johnson (R)
104th (1995–1997)	Barbara Kennelly (D)	Sam Gejdenson (D)	Rosa DeLauro (D)	Chris Shays (R)	Gary Franks (R)	Nancy Johnson (R)
105th (1997–1999)	Barbara Kennelly (D)	Sam Gejdenson (D)	Rosa DeLauro (D)	Chris Shays (R)	James H. Maloney (D)	Nancy Johnson (R)
106th (1999–2001)	John B. Larson (D)	Sam Gejdenson (D)	Rosa DeLauro (D)	Chris Shays (R)	James H. Maloney (D)	Nancy Johnson (R)
107th (2001–2003)	John B. Larson (D)	Rob Simmons (R)	Rosa DeLauro (D)	Chris Shays (R)	James H. Maloney (D)	Nancy Johnson (R)

=== 2003–present: 5 seats ===
Following the 2000 census, Connecticut was apportioned five seats.

Democratic (D) Republican (R)

Members of the House of Representatives from Connecticut from 2003 to present
Congress	1st district	2nd district	3rd district	4th district	5th district
108th (2003–2005)	John B. Larson (D)	Rob Simmons (R)	Rosa DeLauro (D)	Chris Shays (R)	Nancy Johnson (R)
109th (2005–2007)	John B. Larson (D)	Rob Simmons (R)	Rosa DeLauro (D)	Chris Shays (R)	Nancy Johnson (R)
110th (2007–2009)	John B. Larson (D)	Joe Courtney (D)	Rosa DeLauro (D)	Chris Shays (R)	Chris Murphy (D)
111th (2009–2011)	John B. Larson (D)	Joe Courtney (D)	Rosa DeLauro (D)	Jim Himes (D)	Chris Murphy (D)
112th (2011–2013)	John B. Larson (D)	Joe Courtney (D)	Rosa DeLauro (D)	Jim Himes (D)	Chris Murphy (D)
113th (2013–2015)	John B. Larson (D)	Joe Courtney (D)	Rosa DeLauro (D)	Jim Himes (D)	Elizabeth Esty (D)
114th (2015–2017)	John B. Larson (D)	Joe Courtney (D)	Rosa DeLauro (D)	Jim Himes (D)	Elizabeth Esty (D)
115th (2017–2019)	John B. Larson (D)	Joe Courtney (D)	Rosa DeLauro (D)	Jim Himes (D)	Elizabeth Esty (D)
116th (2019–2021)	John B. Larson (D)	Joe Courtney (D)	Rosa DeLauro (D)	Jim Himes (D)	Jahana Hayes (D)
117th (2021–2023)	John B. Larson (D)	Joe Courtney (D)	Rosa DeLauro (D)	Jim Himes (D)	Jahana Hayes (D)
118th (2023–2025)	John B. Larson (D)	Joe Courtney (D)	Rosa DeLauro (D)	Jim Himes (D)	Jahana Hayes (D)
119th (2025–2027)	John B. Larson (D)	Joe Courtney (D)	Rosa DeLauro (D)	Jim Himes (D)	Jahana Hayes (D)
120th (2027–2029)	Luke Bronin (D)	Joe Courtney (D)	Rosa DeLauro (D)	Jim Himes (D)	Jahana Hayes (D)

== See also ==
- List of United States congressional districts
- Connecticut's congressional districts
- Political party strength in Connecticut
