= Antoni Sadlak =

American politician

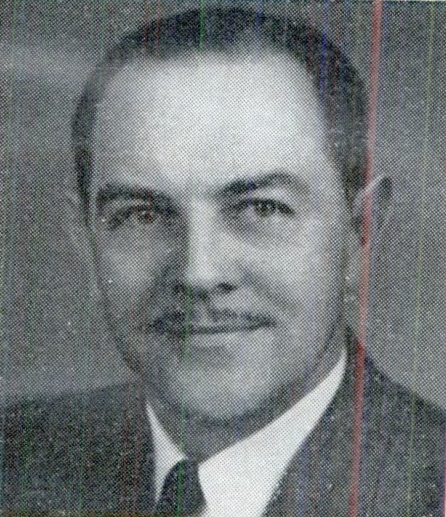
- From 1957's Pocket Congressional Directory of the Eighty-Fifth Congress

Member of the U.S. House of Representatives from Connecticut's at-large district
- In office January 3, 1947 – January 3, 1959
- Preceded by: Joseph F. Ryter
- Succeeded by: Frank Kowalski

Personal details
- Born: Antoni Nicholas Sadlak; June 13, 1908 Rockville, Connecticut, U.S.
- Died: October 18, 1969 (aged 61) Rockville, Connecticut, U.S.
- Resting place: St. Bernard's Cemetery
- Party: Republican
- Education: Georgetown University School of Law

Antoni Nicholas Sadlak (June 13, 1908 – October 18, 1969) was a U.S. representative from Connecticut.

== Biography ==
Born in Rockville, Connecticut, to a Polish immigrant family, Sadlak attended the parochial school. He graduated from George Sykes Manual Training and High School in 1926 and from the Georgetown University School of Law, Washington, D.C., in 1931. He served as special inspector for the Department of Justice from July 1941 to December 1942. He served as assistant secretary-treasurer of the Farmers' Production Credit Association, Hartford, Connecticut, from 1944 to 1946. He was secretary to former Representative Boleslaus Joseph Monkiewicz in 1939, 1940, 1943, and 1944. He served in the United States Naval Reserve in New Guinea, the Philippines, and China from March 1944 to April 1946. He was educational supervisor in the Connecticut Department of Education from July 1, 1946, to September 15, 1946.

Sadlak was elected as a Republican to the Eightieth and to the five succeeding Congresses (January 3, 1947 – January 3, 1959). He had served as staffer to Rep. Boleslaus Monkiewicz in the 76th and 78th congresses, Monkiewicz having lost the intervening election. In 1946 Sadlak was nomination by convention, the practice in the state, and then defeated Ryter, who had ousted Monkiewicz in 1944. The district was state-wide, Connecticut not bothering to redistrict for a newly apportioned seat. Sadlak held on through the state's partisan ups and down until the 1958 Republican nationwide debacle. He tried to return to the House in 1960, but the Kennedy wave in lower New England sent him packing for good. Four public laws were introduced by Sadlak, two on the footwear industry, one affecting taxes on patents, and a third on benefits for survivors of veterans. He served on the Ways and Means Committee in his last three terms. Sadlak voted in favor of the Civil Rights Act of 1957. He was an unsuccessful candidate for reelection in 1958. After his Congressional career, he served as regional assistant manager for the Veterans' Administration, Hartford, Connecticut, from March 30, 1959, to May 2, 1960. He engaged in lecturing and legislative consultation. In 1966, he was elected judge of probate for the Ellington-Vernon District and served until his death in Rockville on October 18, 1969. He was interred in St. Bernard's Cemetery.

== Notes ==
U.S. House of Representatives
Preceded by Joseph F. Ryter	Member of the U.S. House of Representatives from Connecticut's at-large congressional district 1947–1959	Succeeded by Frank Kowalski
