= James Stevens (Connecticut politician) =

American politician

James Stevens (July 4, 1768 – April 4, 1835) was a U.S. representative from Connecticut.

Born in that part of Stamford which is now the town of New Canaan, Connecticut, Stevens studied law. He was admitted to the bar and commenced practice in Stamford, Connecticut. He served as member of the state house of representatives 1804, 1805 from 1808 to 1810, 1814, 1815, 1817, and 1818. He served as judge of probate, Stamford district, in 1819.

Stevens was elected as a Democratic-Republican to the Sixteenth Congress (March 4, 1819 – March 3, 1821). He was in the Justice of the Peace at Stamford 1819-1826. Postmaster of Stamford, Connecticut, from May 17, 1822 to October 5, 1829. He served as judge of Fairfield County Court in 1823. He resumed the practice of law in Stamford, Connecticut, and died there April 4, 1835. He was interred in St. John's and St. Andrew's Episcopal Cemetery.

U.S. House of Representatives
Preceded by Nathaniel Terry	Member of the U.S. House of Representatives from Connecticut's at-large congressional district 1819-1821	Succeeded by Ebenezer Stoddard
