= Lucien J. Maciora =

American politician (1902–1993)

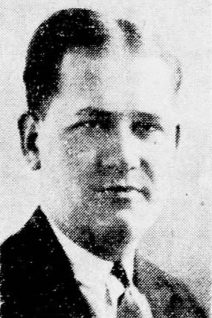

Member of the Connecticut House of Representatives from New Britain
- In office 1931–1937
- Preceded by: William F. Lange; Thure Bengston
- Succeeded by: Charles J. Spooner; Charles J. Prestia

Member of the U.S. House of Representatives from Connecticut's at-large district
- In office January 3, 1941 – January 3, 1943
- Preceded by: B. J. Monkiewicz
- Succeeded by: B. J. Monkiewicz

Personal details
- Born: Lucien John Maciora; August 17, 1902 New Britain, Connecticut, U.S.
- Died: October 19, 1993 (aged 91) New Britain, Connecticut, U.S.
- Resting place: Sacred Heart Cemetery, New Britain, Connecticut, U.S.
- Party: Democratic

Lucien John Maciora (August 17, 1902 – October 19, 1993) was an American politician from Connecticut. A Democrat, from 1931 to 1937, he represented the city of New Britain in the Connecticut House of Representatives. From 1941 to 1943, he was a member of the United States House of Representatives from Connecticut's at-large district.

== Personal life ==
Maciora was born on August 17, 1902, in New Britain, Connecticut. His parents were Polish immigrants. Maciora worked as a grocer, insurance agent, and business owner.

== Career ==
Maciora served on the New Britain, Connecticut, common council from 1926 to 1934, and in the Connecticut House of Representatives from 1931 to 1937.

Maciora served as chairman of the New Britain, Connecticut, police board from 1934 to 1940. He was a city tax collector in New Britain from 1950 to 1969.

Maciora was elected as a Democrat to the Seventy-seventh Congress (January 3, 1941 – January 3, 1943). He was an unsuccessful candidate for reelection to the Seventy-eighth Congress in 1942.

== Death ==
Maciora died on October 19, 1993, in New Britain. He was interred in Sacred Heart Cemetery in New Britain.

== Sources ==
- United States Congress. "Lucien J. Maciora (id: M000018)". Biographical Directory of the United States Congress.

U.S. House of Representatives
Preceded by B. J. Monkiewicz	Member of the U.S. House of Representatives from Connecticut's at-large congressional district 1941–1943	Succeeded by B. J. Monkiewicz
