= Elisha Haley =

American politician (1776–1860)

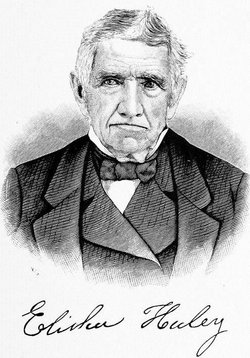

Member of the U.S. House of Representatives from Connecticut
- In office March 4, 1835 – March 3, 1839
- Preceded by: Joseph Trumbull (AL); District established (3rd)
- Succeeded by: District eliminated (AL); Thomas W. Williams (3rd)
- Constituency: At-large district (1835-37); 3rd district (1837-39)

Member of the Connecticut Senate
- In office 1830–

Member of the Connecticut House of Representatives
- In office 1820–
- In office 1824–
- In office 1826–
- In office 1829–
- In office 1833–1834

Personal details
- Born: Elisha Haley; January 21, 1776 Groton, Connecticut Colony, British America
- Died: January 22, 1860 (aged 84) Groton, Connecticut, U.S.
- Resting place: Crary Cemetery
- Party: Jacksonian Democrat
- Spouse: Nancy Crary

Elisha Haley (January 21, 1776 – January 22, 1860) was a United States representative from Connecticut, serving one term from 1835 to 1837.

== Biography ==
He was born in Groton in the Connecticut Colony where he attended the common schools. He engaged in agricultural pursuits.

=== State Senate ===
Haley served in the Connecticut House of Representatives in 1820, 1824, 1826, 1829, 1833, and 1834. He was member of the Connecticut Senate in 1830 and also served as a captain in the Connecticut militia.

=== Congress ===
He was elected as a Jacksonian to the Twenty-fourth Congress and reelected as a Democrat to the Twenty-fifth Congress (March 4, 1835 – March 3, 1839). In Congress, he served as chairman, Committee on Public Expenditures (Twenty-fifth Congress).

=== Later career and death ===
After leaving Congress, he engaged in civil engineering. He died in Groton, Connecticut, in 1860 and was buried in Crary Cemetery.

Political offices
Preceded by.	Member of the Connecticut House of Representatives; 1820, 1824, 1826, 1829, 1833, and 1834	Succeeded by.
Preceded by.	Member of the Connecticut State Senate; 1830	Succeeded by.
Preceded by Joseph Trumbull	Member of the U.S. House of Representatives from Connecticut's at-large District; March 4, 1835 – March 3, 1837	Succeeded by Position abolished Districts established in 1837
Preceded by At-large representation Districts established in 1837	Member of the U.S. House of Representatives from Connecticut's 3rd congressional district March 4, 1837 – March 3, 1839	Succeeded by Thomas Wheeler Williams
