= Connecticut's at-large congressional district =

Historical U.S. House district in the state of Connecticut

- Obsolete district
- Created: 1789 (first)
- Eliminated: 1960 (last)
- Years active: 1789–1837; 1903–1913; 1933–1965

During the first twenty-four Congresses (from 1789 to 1837), Connecticut elected all its representatives in Congress from a single multi-member Connecticut at-large congressional district.

Connecticut elected a varying number of representatives during this period. From its inception in 1789 through the first reapportionment in 1793, there were five seats. From 1793 through 1823, there were seven seats. In 1823 the seats were reduced to six and in 1837 the system of at-large members was replaced with districts.

From 1903 to 1913 and from 1933 to 1965, Connecticut had a member of the United States House of Representatives who represented the state at-large, in addition to the members who represented distinct districts.

== List of representatives ==
=== 1789–1837: five, then seven, then six seats ===
All members were elected statewide at-large on a general ticket.

Congress and years
Congress and years		Seat A			Seat B			Seat C			Seat D			Seat E			Seat F			Seat G		
Congress and years		Rep.	Party	Electoral history	Rep.	Party	Electoral history	Rep.	Party	Electoral history	Rep.	Party	Electoral history	Rep.	Party	Electoral history	Rep.	Party	Electoral history	Rep.	Party	Electoral history
1st	March 4, 1789 – March 3, 1791	Benjamin Huntington (Norwich)	Pro-Admin	Elected in 1788. Lost re-election.	Roger Sherman (New Milford)	Pro-Admin	Elected in 1788. Re-elected in 1790, but instead resigned to become U.S. Senator.	Jonathan Sturges (Fairfield)	Pro-Admin	Elected in 1788. Re-elected in 1790. Re-elected in 1792 but declined to serve.	Jonathan Trumbull Jr. (Lebanon)	Pro-Admin	Elected in 1788. Re-elected in 1790. Re-elected in 1792. Re-elected in 1794 but declined to serve when instead elected U.S. Senator.	Jeremiah Wadsworth (Hartford)	Pro-Admin	Elected in 1788. Initially lost re-election but was re-elected in 1790 to finish the term of Pierpont Edwards (Pro-Administration), who had declined to serve. Re-elected again in 1790. Re-elected in 1792. Retired.	Seat created in 1793.			Seat created in 1793.		
2nd	March 4, 1791 – March 3, 1793	James Hillhouse (New Haven)	Pro-Admin	Elected in 1790. Re-elected in 1792. Re-elected in 1794. Resigned when elected U.S. Senator.	Amasa Learned (New London)	Pro-Admin	Elected to finish Sherman's term. Re-elected in 1792. Retired.	Jonathan Sturges (Fairfield)	Pro-Admin	Elected in 1788. Re-elected in 1790. Re-elected in 1792 but declined to serve.	Jonathan Trumbull Jr. (Lebanon)	Pro-Admin	Elected in 1788. Re-elected in 1790. Re-elected in 1792. Re-elected in 1794 but declined to serve when instead elected U.S. Senator.	Jeremiah Wadsworth (Hartford)	Pro-Admin	Elected in 1788. Initially lost re-election but was re-elected in 1790 to finish the term of Pierpont Edwards (Pro-Administration), who had declined to serve. Re-elected again in 1790. Re-elected in 1792. Retired.	Seat created in 1793.			Seat created in 1793.		
3rd	March 4, 1793 – March 3, 1795	James Hillhouse (New Haven)	Pro-Admin	Elected in 1790. Re-elected in 1792. Re-elected in 1794. Resigned when elected U.S. Senator.	Amasa Learned (New London)	Pro-Admin	Elected to finish Sherman's term. Re-elected in 1792. Retired.	Joshua Coit (New London)	Pro-Admin	Elected in 1792. Re-elected in 1794. Re-elected in 1796. Died.	Jonathan Trumbull Jr. (Lebanon)	Pro-Admin	Elected in 1788. Re-elected in 1790. Re-elected in 1792. Re-elected in 1794 but declined to serve when instead elected U.S. Senator.	Jeremiah Wadsworth (Hartford)	Pro-Admin	Elected in 1788. Initially lost re-election but was re-elected in 1790 to finish the term of Pierpont Edwards (Pro-Administration), who had declined to serve. Re-elected again in 1790. Re-elected in 1792. Retired.	Zephaniah Swift (Windham)	Pro-Admin	Elected in 1792. Re-elected in 1794. Re-elected in 1796 but declined to serve.	Uriah Tracy (Litchfield)	Pro-Admin	Elected in 1792. Re-elected in 1794. Resigned when elected U.S. Senator.
4th	March 4, 1795 – April 13, 1795	James Hillhouse (New Haven)	Federalist	Elected in 1790. Re-elected in 1792. Re-elected in 1794. Resigned when elected U.S. Senator.	Chauncey Goodrich (Hartford)	Federalist	Elected in 1794. Re-elected in 1796. Re-elected in 1798. Lost re-election.	Joshua Coit (New London)	Federalist	Elected in 1792. Re-elected in 1794. Re-elected in 1796. Died.	Vacant			Nathaniel Smith (Woodbury)	Federalist	Elected in 1794. Elected in 1796. Lost re-election.	Zephaniah Swift (Windham)	Federalist	Elected in 1792. Re-elected in 1794. Re-elected in 1796 but declined to serve.	Uriah Tracy (Litchfield)	Federalist	Elected in 1792. Re-elected in 1794. Resigned when elected U.S. Senator.
4th	April 13, 1795 – October 13, 1796	James Hillhouse (New Haven)	Federalist	Elected in 1790. Re-elected in 1792. Re-elected in 1794. Resigned when elected U.S. Senator.	Chauncey Goodrich (Hartford)	Federalist	Elected in 1794. Re-elected in 1796. Re-elected in 1798. Lost re-election.	Joshua Coit (New London)	Federalist	Elected in 1792. Re-elected in 1794. Re-elected in 1796. Died.	Roger Griswold (Lyme)	Federalist	Elected to finish Trumbull's term. Re-elected in 1796. Re-elected in 1798. Re-elected in 1800. Re-elected in 1802. Re-elected in 1804 but resigned.	Nathaniel Smith (Woodbury)	Federalist	Elected in 1794. Elected in 1796. Lost re-election.	Zephaniah Swift (Windham)	Federalist	Elected in 1792. Re-elected in 1794. Re-elected in 1796 but declined to serve.	Uriah Tracy (Litchfield)	Federalist	Elected in 1792. Re-elected in 1794. Resigned when elected U.S. Senator.
4th	October 13, 1796 – December 5, 1796	James Hillhouse (New Haven)	Federalist	Elected in 1790. Re-elected in 1792. Re-elected in 1794. Resigned when elected U.S. Senator.	Chauncey Goodrich (Hartford)	Federalist	Elected in 1794. Re-elected in 1796. Re-elected in 1798. Lost re-election.	Joshua Coit (New London)	Federalist	Elected in 1792. Re-elected in 1794. Re-elected in 1796. Died.	Roger Griswold (Lyme)	Federalist	Elected to finish Trumbull's term. Re-elected in 1796. Re-elected in 1798. Re-elected in 1800. Re-elected in 1802. Re-elected in 1804 but resigned.	Nathaniel Smith (Woodbury)	Federalist	Elected in 1794. Elected in 1796. Lost re-election.	Zephaniah Swift (Windham)	Federalist	Elected in 1792. Re-elected in 1794. Re-elected in 1796 but declined to serve.	Vacant		
4th	December 5, 1796 – January 3, 1797	James Davenport (Stamford)	Federalist	Elected to finish Hillhouse's term, having already been elected to the next term, see below. Elected in 1796. Died.	Chauncey Goodrich (Hartford)	Federalist	Elected in 1794. Re-elected in 1796. Re-elected in 1798. Lost re-election.	Joshua Coit (New London)	Federalist	Elected in 1792. Re-elected in 1794. Re-elected in 1796. Died.	Roger Griswold (Lyme)	Federalist	Elected to finish Trumbull's term. Re-elected in 1796. Re-elected in 1798. Re-elected in 1800. Re-elected in 1802. Re-elected in 1804 but resigned.	Nathaniel Smith (Woodbury)	Federalist	Elected in 1794. Elected in 1796. Lost re-election.	Zephaniah Swift (Windham)	Federalist	Elected in 1792. Re-elected in 1794. Re-elected in 1796 but declined to serve.	Vacant		
4th	January 3, 1797 – March 3, 1797	James Davenport (Stamford)	Federalist	Elected to finish Hillhouse's term, having already been elected to the next term, see below. Elected in 1796. Died.	Chauncey Goodrich (Hartford)	Federalist	Elected in 1794. Re-elected in 1796. Re-elected in 1798. Lost re-election.	Joshua Coit (New London)	Federalist	Elected in 1792. Re-elected in 1794. Re-elected in 1796. Died.	Roger Griswold (Lyme)	Federalist	Elected to finish Trumbull's term. Re-elected in 1796. Re-elected in 1798. Re-elected in 1800. Re-elected in 1802. Re-elected in 1804 but resigned.	Nathaniel Smith (Woodbury)	Federalist	Elected in 1794. Elected in 1796. Lost re-election.	Zephaniah Swift (Windham)	Federalist	Elected in 1792. Re-elected in 1794. Re-elected in 1796 but declined to serve.	Samuel W. Dana (Middletown)	Federalist	Elected to finish Tracy's term. Re-elected in 1796. Re-elected in 1798. Re-elected in 1800. Re-elected in 1802. Re-elected in 1804. Re-elected in 1806. Re-elected in 1808. Resigned to become U.S. Senator.
5th	March 4, 1797 – August 3, 1797	James Davenport (Stamford)	Federalist	Elected to finish Hillhouse's term, having already been elected to the next term, see below. Elected in 1796. Died.	Chauncey Goodrich (Hartford)	Federalist	Elected in 1794. Re-elected in 1796. Re-elected in 1798. Lost re-election.	Joshua Coit (New London)	Federalist	Elected in 1792. Re-elected in 1794. Re-elected in 1796. Died.	Roger Griswold (Lyme)	Federalist	Elected to finish Trumbull's term. Re-elected in 1796. Re-elected in 1798. Re-elected in 1800. Re-elected in 1802. Re-elected in 1804 but resigned.	Nathaniel Smith (Woodbury)	Federalist	Elected in 1794. Elected in 1796. Lost re-election.	John Allen (Litchfield)	Federalist	Elected to finish Swift's term. Retired.	Samuel W. Dana (Middletown)	Federalist	Elected to finish Tracy's term. Re-elected in 1796. Re-elected in 1798. Re-elected in 1800. Re-elected in 1802. Re-elected in 1804. Re-elected in 1806. Re-elected in 1808. Resigned to become U.S. Senator.
5th	August 3, 1797 – November 13, 1797	Vacant			Chauncey Goodrich (Hartford)	Federalist	Elected in 1794. Re-elected in 1796. Re-elected in 1798. Lost re-election.	Joshua Coit (New London)	Federalist	Elected in 1792. Re-elected in 1794. Re-elected in 1796. Died.	Roger Griswold (Lyme)	Federalist	Elected to finish Trumbull's term. Re-elected in 1796. Re-elected in 1798. Re-elected in 1800. Re-elected in 1802. Re-elected in 1804 but resigned.	Nathaniel Smith (Woodbury)	Federalist	Elected in 1794. Elected in 1796. Lost re-election.	John Allen (Litchfield)	Federalist	Elected to finish Swift's term. Retired.	Samuel W. Dana (Middletown)	Federalist	Elected to finish Tracy's term. Re-elected in 1796. Re-elected in 1798. Re-elected in 1800. Re-elected in 1802. Re-elected in 1804. Re-elected in 1806. Re-elected in 1808. Resigned to become U.S. Senator.
5th	November 13, 1797 – September 5, 1798	William Edmond (Newtown)	Federalist	Elected to finish Davenport's term. Re-elected in 1798. Retired.	Chauncey Goodrich (Hartford)	Federalist	Elected in 1794. Re-elected in 1796. Re-elected in 1798. Lost re-election.	Joshua Coit (New London)	Federalist	Elected in 1792. Re-elected in 1794. Re-elected in 1796. Died.	Roger Griswold (Lyme)	Federalist	Elected to finish Trumbull's term. Re-elected in 1796. Re-elected in 1798. Re-elected in 1800. Re-elected in 1802. Re-elected in 1804 but resigned.	Nathaniel Smith (Woodbury)	Federalist	Elected in 1794. Elected in 1796. Lost re-election.	John Allen (Litchfield)	Federalist	Elected to finish Swift's term. Retired.	Samuel W. Dana (Middletown)	Federalist	Elected to finish Tracy's term. Re-elected in 1796. Re-elected in 1798. Re-elected in 1800. Re-elected in 1802. Re-elected in 1804. Re-elected in 1806. Re-elected in 1808. Resigned to become U.S. Senator.
5th	September 5, 1798 – December 3, 1798	William Edmond (Newtown)	Federalist	Elected to finish Davenport's term. Re-elected in 1798. Retired.	Chauncey Goodrich (Hartford)	Federalist	Elected in 1794. Re-elected in 1796. Re-elected in 1798. Lost re-election.	Vacant			Roger Griswold (Lyme)	Federalist	Elected to finish Trumbull's term. Re-elected in 1796. Re-elected in 1798. Re-elected in 1800. Re-elected in 1802. Re-elected in 1804 but resigned.	Nathaniel Smith (Woodbury)	Federalist	Elected in 1794. Elected in 1796. Lost re-election.	John Allen (Litchfield)	Federalist	Elected to finish Swift's term. Retired.	Samuel W. Dana (Middletown)	Federalist	Elected to finish Tracy's term. Re-elected in 1796. Re-elected in 1798. Re-elected in 1800. Re-elected in 1802. Re-elected in 1804. Re-elected in 1806. Re-elected in 1808. Resigned to become U.S. Senator.
5th	December 3, 1798 – March 3, 1799	William Edmond (Newtown)	Federalist	Elected to finish Davenport's term. Re-elected in 1798. Retired.	Chauncey Goodrich (Hartford)	Federalist	Elected in 1794. Re-elected in 1796. Re-elected in 1798. Lost re-election.	Jonathan Brace (Hartford)	Federalist	Elected in 1798. Later elected to finish Coit's term. Resigned.	Roger Griswold (Lyme)	Federalist	Elected to finish Trumbull's term. Re-elected in 1796. Re-elected in 1798. Re-elected in 1800. Re-elected in 1802. Re-elected in 1804 but resigned.	Nathaniel Smith (Woodbury)	Federalist	Elected in 1794. Elected in 1796. Lost re-election.	John Allen (Litchfield)	Federalist	Elected to finish Swift's term. Retired.	Samuel W. Dana (Middletown)	Federalist	Elected to finish Tracy's term. Re-elected in 1796. Re-elected in 1798. Re-elected in 1800. Re-elected in 1802. Re-elected in 1804. Re-elected in 1806. Re-elected in 1808. Resigned to become U.S. Senator.
6th	March 4, 1799 – ?	William Edmond (Newtown)	Federalist	Elected to finish Davenport's term. Re-elected in 1798. Retired.	Chauncey Goodrich (Hartford)	Federalist	Elected in 1794. Re-elected in 1796. Re-elected in 1798. Lost re-election.	Jonathan Brace (Hartford)	Federalist	Elected in 1798. Later elected to finish Coit's term. Resigned.	Roger Griswold (Lyme)	Federalist	Elected to finish Trumbull's term. Re-elected in 1796. Re-elected in 1798. Re-elected in 1800. Re-elected in 1802. Re-elected in 1804 but resigned.	Elizur Goodrich (New Haven)	Federalist	Elected in 1798. Re-elected in 1800 but declined to serve.	John Davenport (Stamford)		Elected in 1798. Re-elected in 1800. Re-elected in 1802. Re-elected in 1804. Re-elected in 1806. Re-elected in 1808. Re-elected in 1810. Re-elected in 1812. Re-elected in 1814. Retired.	Samuel W. Dana (Middletown)	Federalist	Elected to finish Tracy's term. Re-elected in 1796. Re-elected in 1798. Re-elected in 1800. Re-elected in 1802. Re-elected in 1804. Re-elected in 1806. Re-elected in 1808. Resigned to become U.S. Senator.
6th	? 1800 – November 17, 1800	William Edmond (Newtown)	Federalist	Elected to finish Davenport's term. Re-elected in 1798. Retired.	Chauncey Goodrich (Hartford)	Federalist	Elected in 1794. Re-elected in 1796. Re-elected in 1798. Lost re-election.	Vacant			Roger Griswold (Lyme)	Federalist	Elected to finish Trumbull's term. Re-elected in 1796. Re-elected in 1798. Re-elected in 1800. Re-elected in 1802. Re-elected in 1804 but resigned.	Elizur Goodrich (New Haven)	Federalist	Elected in 1798. Re-elected in 1800 but declined to serve.	John Davenport (Stamford)		Elected in 1798. Re-elected in 1800. Re-elected in 1802. Re-elected in 1804. Re-elected in 1806. Re-elected in 1808. Re-elected in 1810. Re-elected in 1812. Re-elected in 1814. Retired.	Samuel W. Dana (Middletown)	Federalist	Elected to finish Tracy's term. Re-elected in 1796. Re-elected in 1798. Re-elected in 1800. Re-elected in 1802. Re-elected in 1804. Re-elected in 1806. Re-elected in 1808. Resigned to become U.S. Senator.
6th	November 17, 1800 – March 3, 1801	William Edmond (Newtown)	Federalist	Elected to finish Davenport's term. Re-elected in 1798. Retired.	Chauncey Goodrich (Hartford)	Federalist	Elected in 1794. Re-elected in 1796. Re-elected in 1798. Lost re-election.	John Cotton Smith (Sharon)	Federalist	Elected to finish Brace's term. Elected in 1800 to the next term. Re-elected in 1802. Re-elected in 1804. Resigned.	Roger Griswold (Lyme)	Federalist	Elected to finish Trumbull's term. Re-elected in 1796. Re-elected in 1798. Re-elected in 1800. Re-elected in 1802. Re-elected in 1804 but resigned.	Elizur Goodrich (New Haven)	Federalist	Elected in 1798. Re-elected in 1800 but declined to serve.	John Davenport (Stamford)		Elected in 1798. Re-elected in 1800. Re-elected in 1802. Re-elected in 1804. Re-elected in 1806. Re-elected in 1808. Re-elected in 1810. Re-elected in 1812. Re-elected in 1814. Retired.	Samuel W. Dana (Middletown)	Federalist	Elected to finish Tracy's term. Re-elected in 1796. Re-elected in 1798. Re-elected in 1800. Re-elected in 1802. Re-elected in 1804. Re-elected in 1806. Re-elected in 1808. Resigned to become U.S. Senator.
7th	March 4, 1801 – May 14, 1801	Vacant			Elias Perkins (New London)	Federalist	Elected in 1800. Re-elected in 1802 but declined to serve.	John Cotton Smith (Sharon)	Federalist	Elected to finish Brace's term. Elected in 1800 to the next term. Re-elected in 1802. Re-elected in 1804. Resigned.	Roger Griswold (Lyme)	Federalist	Elected to finish Trumbull's term. Re-elected in 1796. Re-elected in 1798. Re-elected in 1800. Re-elected in 1802. Re-elected in 1804 but resigned.	Vacant			John Davenport (Stamford)		Elected in 1798. Re-elected in 1800. Re-elected in 1802. Re-elected in 1804. Re-elected in 1806. Re-elected in 1808. Re-elected in 1810. Re-elected in 1812. Re-elected in 1814. Retired.	Samuel W. Dana (Middletown)	Federalist	Elected to finish Tracy's term. Re-elected in 1796. Re-elected in 1798. Re-elected in 1800. Re-elected in 1802. Re-elected in 1804. Re-elected in 1806. Re-elected in 1808. Resigned to become U.S. Senator.
7th	May 14, 1801 – September 21, 1801	Vacant			Elias Perkins (New London)	Federalist	Elected in 1800. Re-elected in 1802 but declined to serve.	John Cotton Smith (Sharon)	Federalist	Elected to finish Brace's term. Elected in 1800 to the next term. Re-elected in 1802. Re-elected in 1804. Resigned.	Roger Griswold (Lyme)	Federalist	Elected to finish Trumbull's term. Re-elected in 1796. Re-elected in 1798. Re-elected in 1800. Re-elected in 1802. Re-elected in 1804 but resigned.	Calvin Goddard (Plainfield)	Federalist	Elected to finish Goodrich's term. Re-elected in 1802. Re-elected in 1804 but resigned.	John Davenport (Stamford)		Elected in 1798. Re-elected in 1800. Re-elected in 1802. Re-elected in 1804. Re-elected in 1806. Re-elected in 1808. Re-elected in 1810. Re-elected in 1812. Re-elected in 1814. Retired.	Samuel W. Dana (Middletown)	Federalist	Elected to finish Tracy's term. Re-elected in 1796. Re-elected in 1798. Re-elected in 1800. Re-elected in 1802. Re-elected in 1804. Re-elected in 1806. Re-elected in 1808. Resigned to become U.S. Senator.
7th	September 21, 1801 – March 3, 1803	Benjamin Tallmadge (Litchfield)	Federalist	Elected to finish Edmond's term. Re-elected in 1802. Re-elected in 1804. Re-elected in 1806. Re-elected in 1808. Re-elected in 1810. Re-elected in 1812. Re-elected in 1814. Retired.	Elias Perkins (New London)	Federalist	Elected in 1800. Re-elected in 1802 but declined to serve.	John Cotton Smith (Sharon)	Federalist	Elected to finish Brace's term. Elected in 1800 to the next term. Re-elected in 1802. Re-elected in 1804. Resigned.	Roger Griswold (Lyme)	Federalist	Elected to finish Trumbull's term. Re-elected in 1796. Re-elected in 1798. Re-elected in 1800. Re-elected in 1802. Re-elected in 1804 but resigned.	Calvin Goddard (Plainfield)	Federalist	Elected to finish Goodrich's term. Re-elected in 1802. Re-elected in 1804 but resigned.	John Davenport (Stamford)		Elected in 1798. Re-elected in 1800. Re-elected in 1802. Re-elected in 1804. Re-elected in 1806. Re-elected in 1808. Re-elected in 1810. Re-elected in 1812. Re-elected in 1814. Retired.	Samuel W. Dana (Middletown)	Federalist	Elected to finish Tracy's term. Re-elected in 1796. Re-elected in 1798. Re-elected in 1800. Re-elected in 1802. Re-elected in 1804. Re-elected in 1806. Re-elected in 1808. Resigned to become U.S. Senator.
8th	March 4, 1803 – March 3, 1805	Benjamin Tallmadge (Litchfield)	Federalist	Elected to finish Edmond's term. Re-elected in 1802. Re-elected in 1804. Re-elected in 1806. Re-elected in 1808. Re-elected in 1810. Re-elected in 1812. Re-elected in 1814. Retired.	Simeon Baldwin (New Haven)	Federalist	Elected to finish Perkins's term. Retired.	John Cotton Smith (Sharon)	Federalist	Elected to finish Brace's term. Elected in 1800 to the next term. Re-elected in 1802. Re-elected in 1804. Resigned.	Roger Griswold (Lyme)	Federalist	Elected to finish Trumbull's term. Re-elected in 1796. Re-elected in 1798. Re-elected in 1800. Re-elected in 1802. Re-elected in 1804 but resigned.	Calvin Goddard (Plainfield)	Federalist	Elected to finish Goodrich's term. Re-elected in 1802. Re-elected in 1804 but resigned.	John Davenport (Stamford)		Elected in 1798. Re-elected in 1800. Re-elected in 1802. Re-elected in 1804. Re-elected in 1806. Re-elected in 1808. Re-elected in 1810. Re-elected in 1812. Re-elected in 1814. Retired.	Samuel W. Dana (Middletown)	Federalist	Elected to finish Tracy's term. Re-elected in 1796. Re-elected in 1798. Re-elected in 1800. Re-elected in 1802. Re-elected in 1804. Re-elected in 1806. Re-elected in 1808. Resigned to become U.S. Senator.
9th	March 4, 1805 – ?before September 16, 1805	Benjamin Tallmadge (Litchfield)	Federalist	Elected to finish Edmond's term. Re-elected in 1802. Re-elected in 1804. Re-elected in 1806. Re-elected in 1808. Re-elected in 1810. Re-elected in 1812. Re-elected in 1814. Retired.	Jonathan O. Moseley (East Haddam)	Federalist	Elected in 1804. Re-elected in 1806. Re-elected in 1808. Re-elected in 1810. Re-elected in 1812. Re-elected in 1814. Re-elected in 1816. Re-elected in 1818 as a Democratic-Republican. Retired.	John Cotton Smith (Sharon)	Federalist	Elected to finish Brace's term. Elected in 1800 to the next term. Re-elected in 1802. Re-elected in 1804. Resigned.	Roger Griswold (Lyme)	Federalist	Elected to finish Trumbull's term. Re-elected in 1796. Re-elected in 1798. Re-elected in 1800. Re-elected in 1802. Re-elected in 1804 but resigned.	Calvin Goddard (Plainfield)	Federalist	Elected to finish Goodrich's term. Re-elected in 1802. Re-elected in 1804 but resigned.	John Davenport (Stamford)		Elected in 1798. Re-elected in 1800. Re-elected in 1802. Re-elected in 1804. Re-elected in 1806. Re-elected in 1808. Re-elected in 1810. Re-elected in 1812. Re-elected in 1814. Retired.	Samuel W. Dana (Middletown)	Federalist	Elected to finish Tracy's term. Re-elected in 1796. Re-elected in 1798. Re-elected in 1800. Re-elected in 1802. Re-elected in 1804. Re-elected in 1806. Re-elected in 1808. Resigned to become U.S. Senator.
9th	?before September 16, 1805 – September 16, 1805	Benjamin Tallmadge (Litchfield)	Federalist	Elected to finish Edmond's term. Re-elected in 1802. Re-elected in 1804. Re-elected in 1806. Re-elected in 1808. Re-elected in 1810. Re-elected in 1812. Re-elected in 1814. Retired.	Jonathan O. Moseley (East Haddam)	Federalist	Elected in 1804. Re-elected in 1806. Re-elected in 1808. Re-elected in 1810. Re-elected in 1812. Re-elected in 1814. Re-elected in 1816. Re-elected in 1818 as a Democratic-Republican. Retired.	John Cotton Smith (Sharon)	Federalist	Elected to finish Brace's term. Elected in 1800 to the next term. Re-elected in 1802. Re-elected in 1804. Resigned.	Vacant			Vacant			John Davenport (Stamford)		Elected in 1798. Re-elected in 1800. Re-elected in 1802. Re-elected in 1804. Re-elected in 1806. Re-elected in 1808. Re-elected in 1810. Re-elected in 1812. Re-elected in 1814. Retired.	Samuel W. Dana (Middletown)	Federalist	Elected to finish Tracy's term. Re-elected in 1796. Re-elected in 1798. Re-elected in 1800. Re-elected in 1802. Re-elected in 1804. Re-elected in 1806. Re-elected in 1808. Resigned to become U.S. Senator.
9th	September 16, 1805 – August 1806	Benjamin Tallmadge (Litchfield)	Federalist	Elected to finish Edmond's term. Re-elected in 1802. Re-elected in 1804. Re-elected in 1806. Re-elected in 1808. Re-elected in 1810. Re-elected in 1812. Re-elected in 1814. Retired.	Jonathan O. Moseley (East Haddam)	Federalist	Elected in 1804. Re-elected in 1806. Re-elected in 1808. Re-elected in 1810. Re-elected in 1812. Re-elected in 1814. Re-elected in 1816. Re-elected in 1818 as a Democratic-Republican. Retired.	John Cotton Smith (Sharon)	Federalist	Elected to finish Brace's term. Elected in 1800 to the next term. Re-elected in 1802. Re-elected in 1804. Resigned.	Timothy Pitkin (Farmington)	Federalist	Elected to finish Griswold's term. Re-elected in 1806. Re-elected in 1808. Re-elected in 1810. Re-elected in 1812. Re-elected in 1814. Re-elected in 1816. Retired.	Lewis B. Sturges (Fairfield)	Federalist	Elected to finish Goddard's term. Re-elected in 1806. Re-elected in 1808. Re-elected in 1810. Re-elected in 1812. Re-elected in 1814. Lost re-election.	John Davenport (Stamford)		Elected in 1798. Re-elected in 1800. Re-elected in 1802. Re-elected in 1804. Re-elected in 1806. Re-elected in 1808. Re-elected in 1810. Re-elected in 1812. Re-elected in 1814. Retired.	Samuel W. Dana (Middletown)	Federalist	Elected to finish Tracy's term. Re-elected in 1796. Re-elected in 1798. Re-elected in 1800. Re-elected in 1802. Re-elected in 1804. Re-elected in 1806. Re-elected in 1808. Resigned to become U.S. Senator.
9th	August 1806 – December 1, 1806	Benjamin Tallmadge (Litchfield)	Federalist	Elected to finish Edmond's term. Re-elected in 1802. Re-elected in 1804. Re-elected in 1806. Re-elected in 1808. Re-elected in 1810. Re-elected in 1812. Re-elected in 1814. Retired.	Jonathan O. Moseley (East Haddam)	Federalist	Elected in 1804. Re-elected in 1806. Re-elected in 1808. Re-elected in 1810. Re-elected in 1812. Re-elected in 1814. Re-elected in 1816. Re-elected in 1818 as a Democratic-Republican. Retired.	Vacant			Timothy Pitkin (Farmington)	Federalist	Elected to finish Griswold's term. Re-elected in 1806. Re-elected in 1808. Re-elected in 1810. Re-elected in 1812. Re-elected in 1814. Re-elected in 1816. Retired.	Lewis B. Sturges (Fairfield)	Federalist	Elected to finish Goddard's term. Re-elected in 1806. Re-elected in 1808. Re-elected in 1810. Re-elected in 1812. Re-elected in 1814. Lost re-election.	John Davenport (Stamford)		Elected in 1798. Re-elected in 1800. Re-elected in 1802. Re-elected in 1804. Re-elected in 1806. Re-elected in 1808. Re-elected in 1810. Re-elected in 1812. Re-elected in 1814. Retired.	Samuel W. Dana (Middletown)	Federalist	Elected to finish Tracy's term. Re-elected in 1796. Re-elected in 1798. Re-elected in 1800. Re-elected in 1802. Re-elected in 1804. Re-elected in 1806. Re-elected in 1808. Resigned to become U.S. Senator.
9th	December 1, 1806 – March 3, 1807	Benjamin Tallmadge (Litchfield)	Federalist	Elected to finish Edmond's term. Re-elected in 1802. Re-elected in 1804. Re-elected in 1806. Re-elected in 1808. Re-elected in 1810. Re-elected in 1812. Re-elected in 1814. Retired.	Jonathan O. Moseley (East Haddam)	Federalist	Elected in 1804. Re-elected in 1806. Re-elected in 1808. Re-elected in 1810. Re-elected in 1812. Re-elected in 1814. Re-elected in 1816. Re-elected in 1818 as a Democratic-Republican. Retired.	Theodore Dwight (Hartford)	Federalist	Elected to finish Smith's term. Retired.	Timothy Pitkin (Farmington)	Federalist	Elected to finish Griswold's term. Re-elected in 1806. Re-elected in 1808. Re-elected in 1810. Re-elected in 1812. Re-elected in 1814. Re-elected in 1816. Retired.	Lewis B. Sturges (Fairfield)	Federalist	Elected to finish Goddard's term. Re-elected in 1806. Re-elected in 1808. Re-elected in 1810. Re-elected in 1812. Re-elected in 1814. Lost re-election.	John Davenport (Stamford)		Elected in 1798. Re-elected in 1800. Re-elected in 1802. Re-elected in 1804. Re-elected in 1806. Re-elected in 1808. Re-elected in 1810. Re-elected in 1812. Re-elected in 1814. Retired.	Samuel W. Dana (Middletown)	Federalist	Elected to finish Tracy's term. Re-elected in 1796. Re-elected in 1798. Re-elected in 1800. Re-elected in 1802. Re-elected in 1804. Re-elected in 1806. Re-elected in 1808. Resigned to become U.S. Senator.
10th	March 4, 1807 – March 3, 1809	Benjamin Tallmadge (Litchfield)	Federalist	Elected to finish Edmond's term. Re-elected in 1802. Re-elected in 1804. Re-elected in 1806. Re-elected in 1808. Re-elected in 1810. Re-elected in 1812. Re-elected in 1814. Retired.	Jonathan O. Moseley (East Haddam)	Federalist	Elected in 1804. Re-elected in 1806. Re-elected in 1808. Re-elected in 1810. Re-elected in 1812. Re-elected in 1814. Re-elected in 1816. Re-elected in 1818 as a Democratic-Republican. Retired.	Epaphroditus Champion (East Haddam)	Federalist	Elected in 1806. Re-elected in 1808. Re-elected in 1810. Re-elected in 1812. Re-elected in 1814. Lost re-election.	Timothy Pitkin (Farmington)	Federalist	Elected to finish Griswold's term. Re-elected in 1806. Re-elected in 1808. Re-elected in 1810. Re-elected in 1812. Re-elected in 1814. Re-elected in 1816. Retired.	Lewis B. Sturges (Fairfield)	Federalist	Elected to finish Goddard's term. Re-elected in 1806. Re-elected in 1808. Re-elected in 1810. Re-elected in 1812. Re-elected in 1814. Lost re-election.	John Davenport (Stamford)		Elected in 1798. Re-elected in 1800. Re-elected in 1802. Re-elected in 1804. Re-elected in 1806. Re-elected in 1808. Re-elected in 1810. Re-elected in 1812. Re-elected in 1814. Retired.	Samuel W. Dana (Middletown)	Federalist	Elected to finish Tracy's term. Re-elected in 1796. Re-elected in 1798. Re-elected in 1800. Re-elected in 1802. Re-elected in 1804. Re-elected in 1806. Re-elected in 1808. Resigned to become U.S. Senator.
11th	March 4, 1809 – May 10, 1810	Benjamin Tallmadge (Litchfield)	Federalist	Elected to finish Edmond's term. Re-elected in 1802. Re-elected in 1804. Re-elected in 1806. Re-elected in 1808. Re-elected in 1810. Re-elected in 1812. Re-elected in 1814. Retired.	Jonathan O. Moseley (East Haddam)	Federalist	Elected in 1804. Re-elected in 1806. Re-elected in 1808. Re-elected in 1810. Re-elected in 1812. Re-elected in 1814. Re-elected in 1816. Re-elected in 1818 as a Democratic-Republican. Retired.	Epaphroditus Champion (East Haddam)	Federalist	Elected in 1806. Re-elected in 1808. Re-elected in 1810. Re-elected in 1812. Re-elected in 1814. Lost re-election.	Timothy Pitkin (Farmington)	Federalist	Elected to finish Griswold's term. Re-elected in 1806. Re-elected in 1808. Re-elected in 1810. Re-elected in 1812. Re-elected in 1814. Re-elected in 1816. Retired.	Lewis B. Sturges (Fairfield)	Federalist	Elected to finish Goddard's term. Re-elected in 1806. Re-elected in 1808. Re-elected in 1810. Re-elected in 1812. Re-elected in 1814. Lost re-election.	John Davenport (Stamford)		Elected in 1798. Re-elected in 1800. Re-elected in 1802. Re-elected in 1804. Re-elected in 1806. Re-elected in 1808. Re-elected in 1810. Re-elected in 1812. Re-elected in 1814. Retired.	Samuel W. Dana (Middletown)	Federalist	Elected to finish Tracy's term. Re-elected in 1796. Re-elected in 1798. Re-elected in 1800. Re-elected in 1802. Re-elected in 1804. Re-elected in 1806. Re-elected in 1808. Resigned to become U.S. Senator.
11th	May 10, 1810 – October 11, 1810	Benjamin Tallmadge (Litchfield)	Federalist	Elected to finish Edmond's term. Re-elected in 1802. Re-elected in 1804. Re-elected in 1806. Re-elected in 1808. Re-elected in 1810. Re-elected in 1812. Re-elected in 1814. Retired.	Jonathan O. Moseley (East Haddam)	Federalist	Elected in 1804. Re-elected in 1806. Re-elected in 1808. Re-elected in 1810. Re-elected in 1812. Re-elected in 1814. Re-elected in 1816. Re-elected in 1818 as a Democratic-Republican. Retired.	Epaphroditus Champion (East Haddam)	Federalist	Elected in 1806. Re-elected in 1808. Re-elected in 1810. Re-elected in 1812. Re-elected in 1814. Lost re-election.	Timothy Pitkin (Farmington)	Federalist	Elected to finish Griswold's term. Re-elected in 1806. Re-elected in 1808. Re-elected in 1810. Re-elected in 1812. Re-elected in 1814. Re-elected in 1816. Retired.	Lewis B. Sturges (Fairfield)	Federalist	Elected to finish Goddard's term. Re-elected in 1806. Re-elected in 1808. Re-elected in 1810. Re-elected in 1812. Re-elected in 1814. Lost re-election.	John Davenport (Stamford)		Elected in 1798. Re-elected in 1800. Re-elected in 1802. Re-elected in 1804. Re-elected in 1806. Re-elected in 1808. Re-elected in 1810. Re-elected in 1812. Re-elected in 1814. Retired.	Vacant		
11th	October 11, 1810 – March 3, 1811	Benjamin Tallmadge (Litchfield)	Federalist	Elected to finish Edmond's term. Re-elected in 1802. Re-elected in 1804. Re-elected in 1806. Re-elected in 1808. Re-elected in 1810. Re-elected in 1812. Re-elected in 1814. Retired.	Jonathan O. Moseley (East Haddam)	Federalist	Elected in 1804. Re-elected in 1806. Re-elected in 1808. Re-elected in 1810. Re-elected in 1812. Re-elected in 1814. Re-elected in 1816. Re-elected in 1818 as a Democratic-Republican. Retired.	Epaphroditus Champion (East Haddam)	Federalist	Elected in 1806. Re-elected in 1808. Re-elected in 1810. Re-elected in 1812. Re-elected in 1814. Lost re-election.	Timothy Pitkin (Farmington)	Federalist	Elected to finish Griswold's term. Re-elected in 1806. Re-elected in 1808. Re-elected in 1810. Re-elected in 1812. Re-elected in 1814. Re-elected in 1816. Retired.	Lewis B. Sturges (Fairfield)	Federalist	Elected to finish Goddard's term. Re-elected in 1806. Re-elected in 1808. Re-elected in 1810. Re-elected in 1812. Re-elected in 1814. Lost re-election.	John Davenport (Stamford)		Elected in 1798. Re-elected in 1800. Re-elected in 1802. Re-elected in 1804. Re-elected in 1806. Re-elected in 1808. Re-elected in 1810. Re-elected in 1812. Re-elected in 1814. Retired.	Ebenezer Huntington (Norwich)	Federalist	Elected September 17, 1810, to finish Dana's term (seated October 11, 1810). Not also elected to the next term.
12th	March 4, 1811 – March 3, 1813	Benjamin Tallmadge (Litchfield)	Federalist	Elected to finish Edmond's term. Re-elected in 1802. Re-elected in 1804. Re-elected in 1806. Re-elected in 1808. Re-elected in 1810. Re-elected in 1812. Re-elected in 1814. Retired.	Jonathan O. Moseley (East Haddam)	Federalist	Elected in 1804. Re-elected in 1806. Re-elected in 1808. Re-elected in 1810. Re-elected in 1812. Re-elected in 1814. Re-elected in 1816. Re-elected in 1818 as a Democratic-Republican. Retired.	Epaphroditus Champion (East Haddam)	Federalist	Elected in 1806. Re-elected in 1808. Re-elected in 1810. Re-elected in 1812. Re-elected in 1814. Lost re-election.	Timothy Pitkin (Farmington)	Federalist	Elected to finish Griswold's term. Re-elected in 1806. Re-elected in 1808. Re-elected in 1810. Re-elected in 1812. Re-elected in 1814. Re-elected in 1816. Retired.	Lewis B. Sturges (Fairfield)	Federalist	Elected to finish Goddard's term. Re-elected in 1806. Re-elected in 1808. Re-elected in 1810. Re-elected in 1812. Re-elected in 1814. Lost re-election.	John Davenport (Stamford)		Elected in 1798. Re-elected in 1800. Re-elected in 1802. Re-elected in 1804. Re-elected in 1806. Re-elected in 1808. Re-elected in 1810. Re-elected in 1812. Re-elected in 1814. Retired.	Lyman Law (New London)	Federalist	Elected in 1810. Re-elected in 1812. Re-elected in 1814. Lost re-election.
13th	March 4, 1813 – March 3, 1815	Benjamin Tallmadge (Litchfield)	Federalist	Elected to finish Edmond's term. Re-elected in 1802. Re-elected in 1804. Re-elected in 1806. Re-elected in 1808. Re-elected in 1810. Re-elected in 1812. Re-elected in 1814. Retired.	Jonathan O. Moseley (East Haddam)	Federalist	Elected in 1804. Re-elected in 1806. Re-elected in 1808. Re-elected in 1810. Re-elected in 1812. Re-elected in 1814. Re-elected in 1816. Re-elected in 1818 as a Democratic-Republican. Retired.	Epaphroditus Champion (East Haddam)	Federalist	Elected in 1806. Re-elected in 1808. Re-elected in 1810. Re-elected in 1812. Re-elected in 1814. Lost re-election.	Timothy Pitkin (Farmington)	Federalist	Elected to finish Griswold's term. Re-elected in 1806. Re-elected in 1808. Re-elected in 1810. Re-elected in 1812. Re-elected in 1814. Re-elected in 1816. Retired.	Lewis B. Sturges (Fairfield)	Federalist	Elected to finish Goddard's term. Re-elected in 1806. Re-elected in 1808. Re-elected in 1810. Re-elected in 1812. Re-elected in 1814. Lost re-election.	John Davenport (Stamford)		Elected in 1798. Re-elected in 1800. Re-elected in 1802. Re-elected in 1804. Re-elected in 1806. Re-elected in 1808. Re-elected in 1810. Re-elected in 1812. Re-elected in 1814. Retired.	Lyman Law (New London)	Federalist	Elected in 1810. Re-elected in 1812. Re-elected in 1814. Lost re-election.
14th	March 4, 1815 – March 3, 1817	Benjamin Tallmadge (Litchfield)	Federalist	Elected to finish Edmond's term. Re-elected in 1802. Re-elected in 1804. Re-elected in 1806. Re-elected in 1808. Re-elected in 1810. Re-elected in 1812. Re-elected in 1814. Retired.	Jonathan O. Moseley (East Haddam)	Federalist	Elected in 1804. Re-elected in 1806. Re-elected in 1808. Re-elected in 1810. Re-elected in 1812. Re-elected in 1814. Re-elected in 1816. Re-elected in 1818 as a Democratic-Republican. Retired.	Epaphroditus Champion (East Haddam)	Federalist	Elected in 1806. Re-elected in 1808. Re-elected in 1810. Re-elected in 1812. Re-elected in 1814. Lost re-election.	Timothy Pitkin (Farmington)	Federalist	Elected to finish Griswold's term. Re-elected in 1806. Re-elected in 1808. Re-elected in 1810. Re-elected in 1812. Re-elected in 1814. Re-elected in 1816. Retired.	Lewis B. Sturges (Fairfield)	Federalist	Elected to finish Goddard's term. Re-elected in 1806. Re-elected in 1808. Re-elected in 1810. Re-elected in 1812. Re-elected in 1814. Lost re-election.	John Davenport (Stamford)		Elected in 1798. Re-elected in 1800. Re-elected in 1802. Re-elected in 1804. Re-elected in 1806. Re-elected in 1808. Re-elected in 1810. Re-elected in 1812. Re-elected in 1814. Retired.	Lyman Law (New London)	Federalist	Elected in 1810. Re-elected in 1812. Re-elected in 1814. Lost re-election.
15th	March 4, 1817 – ? 1818	Thomas Scott Williams (Hartford)	Federalist	Elected in 1816. Retired.	Jonathan O. Moseley (East Haddam)	Federalist	Elected in 1804. Re-elected in 1806. Re-elected in 1808. Re-elected in 1810. Re-elected in 1812. Re-elected in 1814. Re-elected in 1816. Re-elected in 1818 as a Democratic-Republican. Retired.	Uriel Holmes (Litchfield)	Federalist	Elected in 1816. Resigned.	Timothy Pitkin (Farmington)	Federalist	Elected to finish Griswold's term. Re-elected in 1806. Re-elected in 1808. Re-elected in 1810. Re-elected in 1812. Re-elected in 1814. Re-elected in 1816. Retired.	Samuel B. Sherwood (Saugatuck)	Federalist	Elected in 1816. Retired.	Nathaniel Terry (Hartford)	Federalist	Elected to finish the term of member-elect Charles Dennison, who had declined the seat. Retired.	Ebenezer Huntington (Norwich)	Federalist	Elected to finish the term of member-elect Sylvanus Backus, who had died. Retired.
15th	? 1818 – November 16, 1818	Thomas Scott Williams (Hartford)	Federalist	Elected in 1816. Retired.	Jonathan O. Moseley (East Haddam)	Federalist	Elected in 1804. Re-elected in 1806. Re-elected in 1808. Re-elected in 1810. Re-elected in 1812. Re-elected in 1814. Re-elected in 1816. Re-elected in 1818 as a Democratic-Republican. Retired.	Vacant			Timothy Pitkin (Farmington)	Federalist	Elected to finish Griswold's term. Re-elected in 1806. Re-elected in 1808. Re-elected in 1810. Re-elected in 1812. Re-elected in 1814. Re-elected in 1816. Retired.	Samuel B. Sherwood (Saugatuck)	Federalist	Elected in 1816. Retired.	Nathaniel Terry (Hartford)	Federalist	Elected to finish the term of member-elect Charles Dennison, who had declined the seat. Retired.	Ebenezer Huntington (Norwich)	Federalist	Elected to finish the term of member-elect Sylvanus Backus, who had died. Retired.
15th	November 16, 1818 – March 3, 1819	Thomas Scott Williams (Hartford)	Federalist	Elected in 1816. Retired.	Jonathan O. Moseley (East Haddam)	Federalist	Elected in 1804. Re-elected in 1806. Re-elected in 1808. Re-elected in 1810. Re-elected in 1812. Re-elected in 1814. Re-elected in 1816. Re-elected in 1818 as a Democratic-Republican. Retired.	Sylvester Gilbert (Hebron)	Democratic-Republican	Elected to finish Holmes's term. Was not elected to the next term.	Timothy Pitkin (Farmington)	Federalist	Elected to finish Griswold's term. Re-elected in 1806. Re-elected in 1808. Re-elected in 1810. Re-elected in 1812. Re-elected in 1814. Re-elected in 1816. Retired.	Samuel B. Sherwood (Saugatuck)	Federalist	Elected in 1816. Retired.	Nathaniel Terry (Hartford)	Federalist	Elected to finish the term of member-elect Charles Dennison, who had declined the seat. Retired.	Ebenezer Huntington (Norwich)	Federalist	Elected to finish the term of member-elect Sylvanus Backus, who had died. Retired.
16th	March 4, 1819 – March 3, 1821	Gideon Tomlinson (Fairfield)	Democratic-Republican	Elected in 1818. Re-elected in 1821. Re-elected in 1823. Re-elected in 1825. Retired.	Jonathan O. Moseley (East Haddam)	Democratic-Republican	Elected in 1804. Re-elected in 1806. Re-elected in 1808. Re-elected in 1810. Re-elected in 1812. Re-elected in 1814. Re-elected in 1816. Re-elected in 1818 as a Democratic-Republican. Retired.	Samuel A. Foot (Cheshire)	Democratic-Republican	Elected in 1818. Lost re-election.	John Russ (Hartford)	Democratic-Republican	Elected in 1818. Re-elected in 1821. Lost re-election.	James Stevens (Stamford)	Democratic-Republican	Elected in 1818. Retired.	Elisha Phelps (Simsbury)	Democratic-Republican	Elected in 1818. Lost re-election.	Henry W. Edwards (New Haven)	Democratic-Republican	Elected in 1818. Re-elected in 1821. Lost re-election.
17th	March 4, 1821 – March 3, 1823	Gideon Tomlinson (Fairfield)	Democratic-Republican	Elected in 1818. Re-elected in 1821. Re-elected in 1823. Re-elected in 1825. Retired.	Ansel Sterling (Sharon)	Democratic-Republican	Elected in 1821. Re-elected in 1823. Retired.	Daniel Burrows (Hebron)	Democratic-Republican	Elected in 1821. Lost re-election.	John Russ (Hartford)	Democratic-Republican	Elected in 1818. Re-elected in 1821. Lost re-election.	Noyes Barber (Groton)	Democratic-Republican	Elected in 1821. Re-elected in 1823. Re-elected in 1825. Re-elected in 1827. Re-elected in 1829. Re-elected in 1831. Re-elected in 1833. Lost re-election.	Ebenezer Stoddard (Woodstock)	Democratic-Republican	Elected in 1821. Re-elected in 1823. Retired.	Henry W. Edwards (New Haven)	Democratic-Republican	Elected in 1818. Re-elected in 1821. Lost re-election.
18th	March 4, 1823 – March 3, 1825	Gideon Tomlinson (Fairfield)	Democratic-Republican	Elected in 1818. Re-elected in 1821. Re-elected in 1823. Re-elected in 1825. Retired.	Ansel Sterling (Sharon)	Democratic-Republican	Elected in 1821. Re-elected in 1823. Retired.	Samuel A. Foot (Cheshire)	Democratic-Republican	Elected in 1823. Lost re-election.	Lemuel Whitman (Farmington)	Democratic-Republican	Elected in 1823. Retired.	Noyes Barber (Groton)	Democratic-Republican	Elected in 1821. Re-elected in 1823. Re-elected in 1825. Re-elected in 1827. Re-elected in 1829. Re-elected in 1831. Re-elected in 1833. Lost re-election.	Ebenezer Stoddard (Woodstock)	Democratic-Republican	Elected in 1821. Re-elected in 1823. Retired.	Seat eliminated in 1823.		
19th	March 4, 1825 – March 3, 1827	Gideon Tomlinson (Fairfield)	Anti-Jacksonian	Elected in 1818. Re-elected in 1821. Re-elected in 1823. Re-elected in 1825. Retired.	John Baldwin (Windham)	Anti-Jacksonian	Elected in 1825. Re-elected in 1827. Retired.	Ralph I. Ingersoll (New Haven)	Anti-Jacksonian	Elected in 1825. Re-elected in 1827. Re-elected in 1829. Re-elected in 1831. Retired.	Orange Merwin (New Milford)	Anti-Jacksonian	Elected in 1825. Re-elected in 1827. Lost re-election.	Noyes Barber (Groton)	Anti-Jacksonian	Elected in 1821. Re-elected in 1823. Re-elected in 1825. Re-elected in 1827. Re-elected in 1829. Re-elected in 1831. Re-elected in 1833. Lost re-election.	Elisha Phelps (Simsbury)	Anti-Jacksonian	Elected in 1825. Re-elected in 1827. Lost re-election.	Seat eliminated in 1823.		
20th	March 4, 1827 – March 3, 1829	David Plant (Stratford)	Anti-Jacksonian	Elected in 1827. Retired.	John Baldwin (Windham)	Anti-Jacksonian	Elected in 1825. Re-elected in 1827. Retired.	Ralph I. Ingersoll (New Haven)	Anti-Jacksonian	Elected in 1825. Re-elected in 1827. Re-elected in 1829. Re-elected in 1831. Retired.	Orange Merwin (New Milford)	Anti-Jacksonian	Elected in 1825. Re-elected in 1827. Lost re-election.	Noyes Barber (Groton)	Anti-Jacksonian	Elected in 1821. Re-elected in 1823. Re-elected in 1825. Re-elected in 1827. Re-elected in 1829. Re-elected in 1831. Re-elected in 1833. Lost re-election.	Elisha Phelps (Simsbury)	Anti-Jacksonian	Elected in 1825. Re-elected in 1827. Lost re-election.	Seat eliminated in 1823.		
21st	March 4, 1829 – March 3, 1831	William W. Ellsworth (Hartford)	Anti-Jacksonian	Elected in 1829. Re-elected in 1831. Re-elected in 1833. Resigned.	Jabez W. Huntington (Litchfield)	Anti-Jacksonian	Elected in 1829. Re-elected in 1831. Re-elected in 1833. Resigned to become judge of the Connecticut Supreme Court of Errors.	Ralph I. Ingersoll (New Haven)	Anti-Jacksonian	Elected in 1825. Re-elected in 1827. Re-elected in 1829. Re-elected in 1831. Retired.	Ebenezer Young (Killingly Center)	Anti-Jacksonian	Elected in 1829. Re-elected in 1831. Re-elected in 1833. Lost re-election.	Noyes Barber (Groton)	Anti-Jacksonian	Elected in 1821. Re-elected in 1823. Re-elected in 1825. Re-elected in 1827. Re-elected in 1829. Re-elected in 1831. Re-elected in 1833. Lost re-election.	William L. Storrs (Middletown)	Anti-Jacksonian	Elected in 1829. Re-elected in 1831. Retired.	Seat eliminated in 1823.		
22nd	March 4, 1831 – March 3, 1833	William W. Ellsworth (Hartford)	Anti-Jacksonian	Elected in 1829. Re-elected in 1831. Re-elected in 1833. Resigned.	Jabez W. Huntington (Litchfield)	Anti-Jacksonian	Elected in 1829. Re-elected in 1831. Re-elected in 1833. Resigned to become judge of the Connecticut Supreme Court of Errors.	Ralph I. Ingersoll (New Haven)	Anti-Jacksonian	Elected in 1825. Re-elected in 1827. Re-elected in 1829. Re-elected in 1831. Retired.	Ebenezer Young (Killingly Center)	Anti-Jacksonian	Elected in 1829. Re-elected in 1831. Re-elected in 1833. Lost re-election.	Noyes Barber (Groton)	Anti-Jacksonian	Elected in 1821. Re-elected in 1823. Re-elected in 1825. Re-elected in 1827. Re-elected in 1829. Re-elected in 1831. Re-elected in 1833. Lost re-election.	William L. Storrs (Middletown)	Anti-Jacksonian	Elected in 1829. Re-elected in 1831. Retired.	Seat eliminated in 1823.		
23rd	March 4, 1833 – May 9, 1834	William W. Ellsworth (Hartford)	Anti-Jacksonian	Elected in 1829. Re-elected in 1831. Re-elected in 1833. Resigned.	Jabez W. Huntington (Litchfield)	Anti-Jacksonian	Elected in 1829. Re-elected in 1831. Re-elected in 1833. Resigned to become judge of the Connecticut Supreme Court of Errors.	Samuel A. Foot (Cheshire)	Anti-Jacksonian	Elected in 1833. Resigned to become Governor of Connecticut.	Ebenezer Young (Killingly Center)	Anti-Jacksonian	Elected in 1829. Re-elected in 1831. Re-elected in 1833. Lost re-election.	Noyes Barber (Groton)	Anti-Jacksonian	Elected in 1821. Re-elected in 1823. Re-elected in 1825. Re-elected in 1827. Re-elected in 1829. Re-elected in 1831. Re-elected in 1833. Lost re-election.	Samuel Tweedy (Danbury)	Anti-Jacksonian	Elected in 1833. Lost re-election.	Seat eliminated in 1823.		
23rd	May 9, 1834 – July 8, 1834	William W. Ellsworth (Hartford)	Anti-Jacksonian	Elected in 1829. Re-elected in 1831. Re-elected in 1833. Resigned.	Jabez W. Huntington (Litchfield)	Anti-Jacksonian	Elected in 1829. Re-elected in 1831. Re-elected in 1833. Resigned to become judge of the Connecticut Supreme Court of Errors.	Vacant			Ebenezer Young (Killingly Center)	Anti-Jacksonian	Elected in 1829. Re-elected in 1831. Re-elected in 1833. Lost re-election.	Noyes Barber (Groton)	Anti-Jacksonian	Elected in 1821. Re-elected in 1823. Re-elected in 1825. Re-elected in 1827. Re-elected in 1829. Re-elected in 1831. Re-elected in 1833. Lost re-election.	Samuel Tweedy (Danbury)	Anti-Jacksonian	Elected in 1833. Lost re-election.	Seat eliminated in 1823.		
23rd	July 8, 1834 – August 16, 1834	Vacant			Jabez W. Huntington (Litchfield)	Anti-Jacksonian	Elected in 1829. Re-elected in 1831. Re-elected in 1833. Resigned to become judge of the Connecticut Supreme Court of Errors.	Vacant			Ebenezer Young (Killingly Center)	Anti-Jacksonian	Elected in 1829. Re-elected in 1831. Re-elected in 1833. Lost re-election.	Noyes Barber (Groton)	Anti-Jacksonian	Elected in 1821. Re-elected in 1823. Re-elected in 1825. Re-elected in 1827. Re-elected in 1829. Re-elected in 1831. Re-elected in 1833. Lost re-election.	Samuel Tweedy (Danbury)	Anti-Jacksonian	Elected in 1833. Lost re-election.	Seat eliminated in 1823.		
23rd	August 16, 1834 – December 1, 1834	Vacant			Vacant			Vacant			Ebenezer Young (Killingly Center)	Anti-Jacksonian	Elected in 1829. Re-elected in 1831. Re-elected in 1833. Lost re-election.	Noyes Barber (Groton)	Anti-Jacksonian	Elected in 1821. Re-elected in 1823. Re-elected in 1825. Re-elected in 1827. Re-elected in 1829. Re-elected in 1831. Re-elected in 1833. Lost re-election.	Samuel Tweedy (Danbury)	Anti-Jacksonian	Elected in 1833. Lost re-election.	Seat eliminated in 1823.		
23rd	December 1, 1834 – March 3, 1835	Joseph Trumbull (Hartford)	Anti-Jacksonian	Elected to finish Ellsworth's term. Lost re-election.	Phineas Miner (Litchfield)	Anti-Jacksonian	Elected to finish Huntington's term. Retired.	Ebenezer Jackson Jr. (Middletown)	Anti-Jacksonian	Elected to finish Foot's term. Lost re-election.	Ebenezer Young (Killingly Center)	Anti-Jacksonian	Elected in 1829. Re-elected in 1831. Re-elected in 1833. Lost re-election.	Noyes Barber (Groton)	Anti-Jacksonian	Elected in 1821. Re-elected in 1823. Re-elected in 1825. Re-elected in 1827. Re-elected in 1829. Re-elected in 1831. Re-elected in 1833. Lost re-election.	Samuel Tweedy (Danbury)	Anti-Jacksonian	Elected in 1833. Lost re-election.	Seat eliminated in 1823.		
24th	March 4, 1835 – December 10, 1835	Isaac Toucey (Hartford)	Jacksonian	Elected in 1835. Redistricted to the 1st district.	Samuel Ingham (Saybrook)	Jacksonian	Elected in 1835. Redistricted to the 2nd district.	Elisha Haley (Mystic)	Jacksonian	Elected in 1835. Redistricted to the 3rd district.	Zalmon Wildman (Danbury)	Jacksonian	Elected in 1835. Died.	Lancelot Phelps (Hitchcockville)	Jacksonian	Elected in 1835. Redistricted to the 5th district.	Andrew T. Judson (Canterbury)	Jacksonian	Elected in 1835. Resigned to become U.S. District Judge.	Seat eliminated in 1823.		
24th	December 10, 1835 – April 29, 1836	Isaac Toucey (Hartford)	Jacksonian	Elected in 1835. Redistricted to the 1st district.	Samuel Ingham (Saybrook)	Jacksonian	Elected in 1835. Redistricted to the 2nd district.	Elisha Haley (Mystic)	Jacksonian	Elected in 1835. Redistricted to the 3rd district.	Vacant			Lancelot Phelps (Hitchcockville)	Jacksonian	Elected in 1835. Redistricted to the 5th district.	Andrew T. Judson (Canterbury)	Jacksonian	Elected in 1835. Resigned to become U.S. District Judge.	Seat eliminated in 1823.		
24th	April 29, 1836 – July 4, 1836	Isaac Toucey (Hartford)	Jacksonian	Elected in 1835. Redistricted to the 1st district.	Samuel Ingham (Saybrook)	Jacksonian	Elected in 1835. Redistricted to the 2nd district.	Elisha Haley (Mystic)	Jacksonian	Elected in 1835. Redistricted to the 3rd district.	Thomas T. Whittlesey (Danbury)	Jacksonian	Elected to finish Wildman's term. Redistricted to the 4th district.	Lancelot Phelps (Hitchcockville)	Jacksonian	Elected in 1835. Redistricted to the 5th district.	Andrew T. Judson (Canterbury)	Jacksonian	Elected in 1835. Resigned to become U.S. District Judge.	Seat eliminated in 1823.		
24th	July 4, 1836 – December 5, 1836	Isaac Toucey (Hartford)	Jacksonian	Elected in 1835. Redistricted to the 1st district.	Samuel Ingham (Saybrook)	Jacksonian	Elected in 1835. Redistricted to the 2nd district.	Elisha Haley (Mystic)	Jacksonian	Elected in 1835. Redistricted to the 3rd district.	Thomas T. Whittlesey (Danbury)	Jacksonian	Elected to finish Wildman's term. Redistricted to the 4th district.	Lancelot Phelps (Hitchcockville)	Jacksonian	Elected in 1835. Redistricted to the 5th district.	Vacant			Seat eliminated in 1823.		
24th	December 5, 1836 – March 3, 1837	Isaac Toucey (Hartford)	Jacksonian	Elected in 1835. Redistricted to the 1st district.	Samuel Ingham (Saybrook)	Jacksonian	Elected in 1835. Redistricted to the 2nd district.	Elisha Haley (Mystic)	Jacksonian	Elected in 1835. Redistricted to the 3rd district.	Thomas T. Whittlesey (Danbury)	Jacksonian	Elected to finish Wildman's term. Redistricted to the 4th district.	Lancelot Phelps (Hitchcockville)	Jacksonian	Elected in 1835. Redistricted to the 5th district.	Orrin Holt (Willington)	Jacksonian	Elected to finish Judson's term. Redistricted to the 6th district.	Seat eliminated in 1823.		

In 1837, Connecticut abandoned general tickets and adopted districts instead.

=== 1903–1913: one seat ===
In 1903, one at-large seat was created, four district seats continued.

Member	Party	Years	Cong ress(es)	Electoral history
At-large seat created March 4, 1903
George L. Lilley (Waterbury)	Republican	March 4, 1903 – January 5, 1909	58th 59th 60th	Elected in 1902. Re-elected in 1904. Re-elected in 1906. Resigned when elected Governor of Connecticut.
Vacant		January 5, 1909 – March 3, 1909	60th	
John Q. Tilson (New Haven)	Republican	March 4, 1909 – March 3, 1913	61st 62nd	Elected in 1908. Re-elected in 1910. Redistricted to the 3rd district and lost re-election.
At-large seat eliminated March 3, 1913

=== 1933–1965: one seat ===
In 1933, one at-large seat was created, five district seats continued.

Representative	Party	Years	Cong ress(es)	Electoral history
Charles Montague Bakewell (New Haven)	Republican	March 4, 1933 – January 3, 1935	73rd	Elected in 1932. Lost re-election.
William M. Citron (Middletown)	Democratic	January 3, 1935 – January 3, 1939	74th 75th	Elected in 1934. Re-elected in 1936. Lost re-election.
B. J. Monkiewicz (New Britain)	Republican	January 3, 1939 – January 3, 1941	76th	Elected in 1938. Lost re-election.
Lucien J. Maciora (New Britain)	Democratic	January 3, 1941 – January 3, 1943	77th	Elected in 1940. Lost re-election.
B. J. Monkiewicz (New Britain)	Republican	January 3, 1943 – January 3, 1945	78th	Elected in 1942. Lost re-election.
Joseph F. Ryter (Hartford)	Democratic	January 3, 1945 – January 3, 1947	79th	Elected in 1944. Lost re-election.
Antoni Sadlak (Rockville)	Republican	January 3, 1947 – January 3, 1959	80th 81st 82nd 83rd 84th 85th	Elected in 1946. Re-elected in 1948. Re-elected in 1950. Re-elected in 1952. Re-elected in 1954. Re-elected in 1956. Lost re-election.
Frank Kowalski (Meriden)	Democratic	January 3, 1959 – January 3, 1963	86th 87th	Elected in 1958. Re-elected in 1960. Retired to run for U.S. senator.
Bernard F. Grabowski (Bristol)	Democratic	January 3, 1963 – January 3, 1965	88th	Elected in 1962. Redistricted to the 6th district.
At-large district eliminated
