= Samuel Tweedy =

American politician

Samuel Tweedy (March 8, 1776 – July 1, 1868) was a United States representative from Connecticut.

Born at Nine Partners, New York in 1776, he later moved to Danbury, Connecticut. He was a member of the Connecticut House of Representatives in 1818, 1820, and 1824 and also served in the Connecticut Senate 1826–1828.

Tweedy held many local offices before being elected as an Anti-Jacksonian to the Twenty-third Congress (March 4, 1833 – March 3, 1835). He died in Danbury, Connecticut, aged 92. He was buried in Wooster Cemetery.

U.S. House of Representatives
Preceded by Elisha Phelps	Member of the U.S. House of Representatives from Connecticut's at-large congressional district 1833-1835	Succeeded by Zalmon Wildman
