= Joseph F. Ryter =

American politician

- Ryter c. 1946

U.S. Representative from Connecticut's at-large congressional district
- In office January 3, 1945 – January 3, 1947
- Preceded by: B. J. Monkiewicz
- Succeeded by: Antoni Sadlak

Personal details
- Born: Joseph Francis Ryter; February 4, 1914 Hartford, Connecticut
- Died: February 5, 1978 (aged 64) West Hartford, Connecticut
- Party: Democratic

Joseph Francis Ryter (February 4, 1914 – February 5, 1978) was a U.S. representative from Connecticut.

Born in Hartford, Connecticut, to Polish immigrants, Ryter attended the parochial schools and St. Thomas Seminary, Bloomfield, Connecticut. He was graduated from Trinity College, Hartford, Connecticut, in 1935 and from Hartford (Connecticut) College of Law in 1938. He was admitted to the bar in 1938 and commenced practice in Hartford, Connecticut. He served as assistant clerk of Hartford Police Court 1939–1941, and of Hartford City Court 1941–1943. He served as delegate to the Democratic National Convention in 1940. He served as president of Pulaski Federation of Democratic Clubs of Connecticut 1939–1942.

Ryter was elected as a Democrat to the Seventy-ninth Congress (January 3, 1945 – January 3, 1947). He was an unsuccessful candidate for reelection in 1946 to the Eightieth Congress. He resumed the practice of his profession. Resided in West Hartford, Connecticut, where he died February 5, 1978. He was interred in Mount Saint Benedict Cemetery, Bloomfield, Connecticut.

U.S. House of Representatives
Preceded by B. J. Monkiewicz	Member of the U.S. House of Representatives from Connecticut's at-large congressional district 1945–1947	Succeeded by Antoni Sadlak
