= William M. Citron =

American politician (1896–1976)

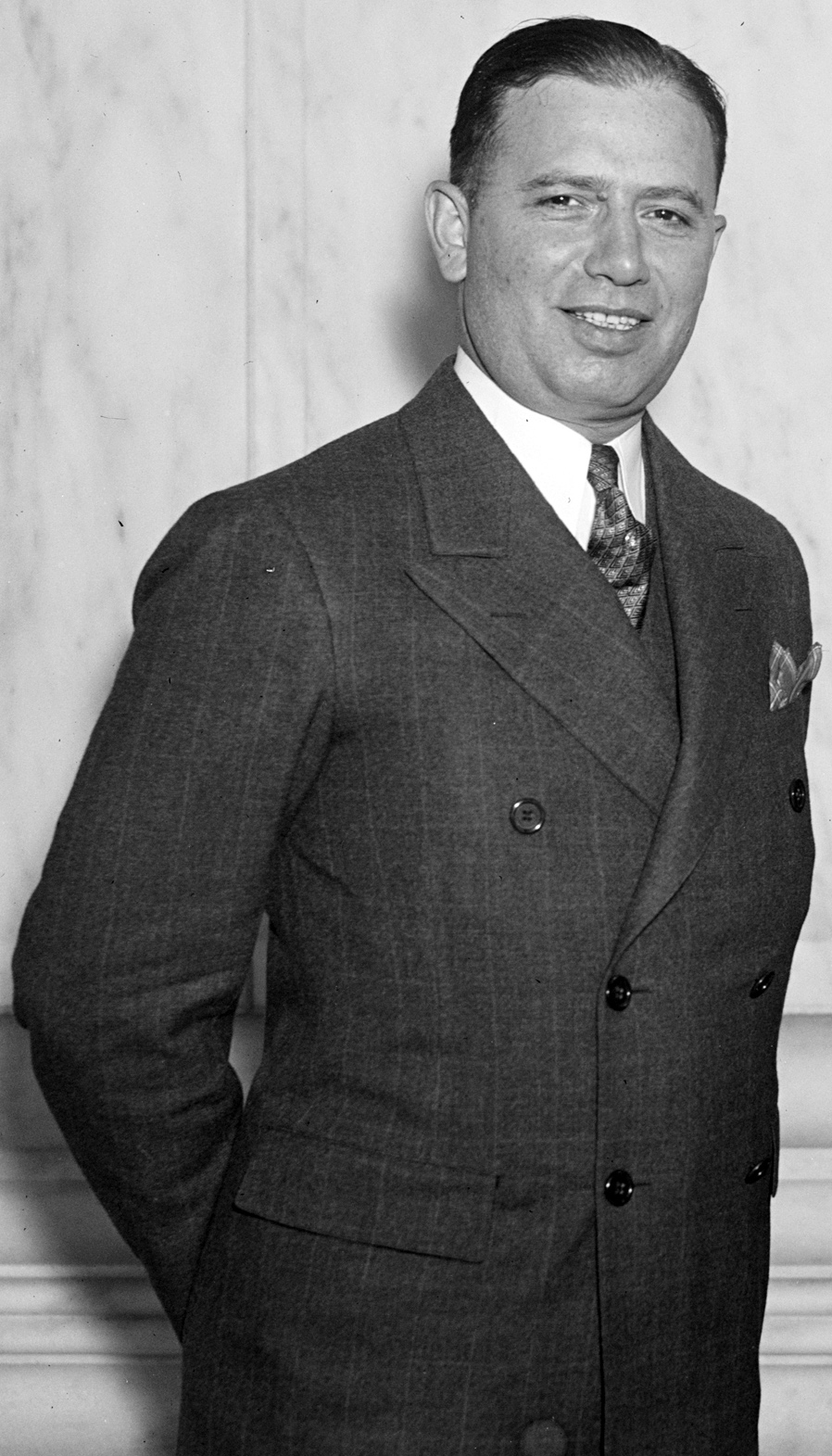

Member of the U.S. House of Representatives from Connecticut's at-large district
- In office January 3, 1935 – January 3, 1939
- Preceded by: Charles Montague Bakewell
- Succeeded by: B. J. Monkiewicz

Member of the Connecticut House of Representatives
- In office 1931–1933
- In office 1927–1929

Personal details
- Born: William Michael Citron; August 29, 1896 New Haven, Connecticut, U.S.
- Died: June 7, 1976 (aged 79) Titusville, Florida, U.S.
- Resting place: Congregation Adath Israel Cemetery, Middletown, Connecticut, U.S.
- Party: Democratic
- Education: Wesleyan University; Harvard University
- Occupation: Politician, lawyer

William Michael Citron (August 29, 1896 – June 7, 1976) was a U.S. representative from Connecticut.

Born in New Haven, Connecticut, Citron moved with his parents to Middletown, Connecticut, in 1899, where he attended grammar and high school. He graduated from Wesleyan University in 1918 and from the law department of Harvard University in 1921.

Citron was commissioned a second lieutenant of Field Artillery on September 16, 1918, and was in training until discharged on December 14, 1918. He was admitted to the bar in 1922 and commenced practice in Middletown, Connecticut. He served as member of the State house of representatives 1927-1929 and 1931–1933, serving as minority leader during two sessions. He was an unsuccessful candidate for election in 1928 to the Seventy-first Congress and in 1932 to the Seventy-third Congress. City corporation counsel 1928-1934. He served as a member of the Connecticut Old Age Pension Commission in 1932 and 1933. He served as clerk of the State Senate, 1933-1935.

Citron was elected as a Democrat to the Seventy-fourth Congress. He was reelected to the Seventy-fifth Congress (January 3, 1935 – January 3, 1939). He was an unsuccessful candidate for reelection in 1938 to the Seventy-sixth Congress. He served as chairman of the Housing Authority of Middletown, Connecticut from 1940 to 1942. He entered the military service of the United States as captain, Corps of Military Police, on July 16, 1942, and was subsequently promoted to major on April 16, 1943. He served in Africa from October 1942 until he retired for physical incapacity on March 3, 1944. He resumed the practice of law. He served as a member of the Connecticut Veterans Reemployment and Advisory Commission in 1948 and 1949. Commander, Connecticut Disabled American Veterans from 1947 to 1948. He was an unsuccessful candidate in 1952 for election to the Eighty-third Congress. He died in Titusville, Florida, June 7, 1976. He was interred in Congregation Adath Israel Cemetery, Middletown, Connecticut.

== See also ==
- List of Jewish members of the United States Congress

U.S. House of Representatives
Preceded by Charles Montague Bakewell	Member of the U.S. House of Representatives from Connecticut's at-large congressional district 1935–1939	Succeeded by B. J. Monkiewicz
