= B. J. Monkiewicz =

American judge and politician

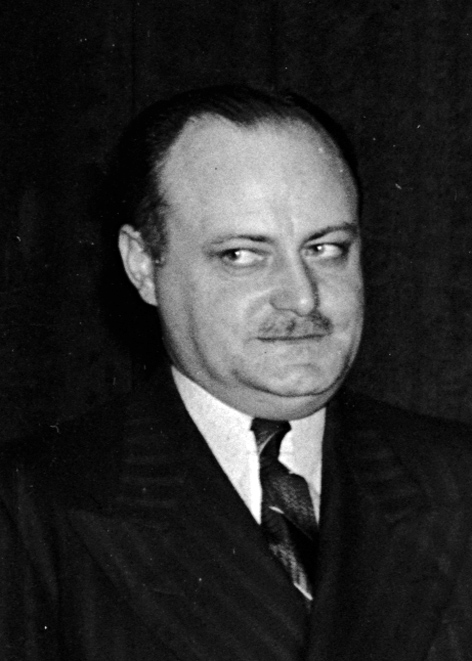

Member of the U.S. House of Representatives from Connecticut's at-large district
- In office January 3, 1943 – January 3, 1945
- Preceded by: Lucien J. Maciora
- Succeeded by: Joseph F. Ryter
- In office January 3, 1939 – January 3, 1941
- Preceded by: William M. Citron
- Succeeded by: Lucien J. Maciora

Personal details
- Born: Boleslaus Joseph Monkiewicz; August 8, 1898 Syracuse, New York, U.S.
- Died: July 2, 1971 (aged 72) New Britain, Connecticut, U.S.
- Resting place: Sacred Heart Cemetery
- Party: Republican
- Education: Fordham University
- Occupation: Politician, attorney, judge

Military service
- Allegiance: United States
- Branch/service: United States Navy
- Years of service: 1918
- Rank: Seaman

Boleslaus Joseph Monkiewicz (August 8, 1898 – July 2, 1971) was an American lawyer, politician and U.S. representative from Connecticut.

Born in Syracuse, New York, Monkiewicz moved with his parents to New Britain, Connecticut, in 1899. He attended the public schools and was graduated from New Britain (Connecticut) High School in 1917. He served as an apprentice seaman in the United States Navy (Columbia University Naval Unit), October 3, 1918, to December 17, 1918. He was graduated from the law department of Fordham University, New York City, in 1921. He was admitted to the bar in 1933 and commenced practice in New York and Connecticut. He also engaged in banking. He served as clerk of the New Britain, Connecticut, city and police court from July 1932 to August 1933. He served as prosecuting attorney for the police court from 1937 to 1939.

Monkiewicz was elected as a Republican to the Seventy-sixth Congress (January 3, 1939 – January 3, 1941). He was an unsuccessful candidate for reelection in 1940 to the Seventy-seventh Congress.

Monkiewicz was elected to the Seventy-eighth Congress (January 3, 1943 – January 3, 1945). He was an unsuccessful candidate for reelection in 1944 to the Seventy-ninth Congress. He resumed the practice of law and also was unemployment compensation commissioner of Connecticut. He served as member of the United States Board of Parole (now the United States Parole Commission) at Washington, D.C. from 1947 to 1953. He resumed the practice of law in New Britain, Connecticut. He served as judge of circuit court of Connecticut from 1961 to 1968. He resided in Kensington, Connecticut. He died in New Britain, Connecticut, July 2, 1971. He was interred in Sacred Heart Cemetery.

U.S. House of Representatives
| Preceded by William M. Citron | Member of the U.S. House of Representatives from Connecticut's at-large congressional district 1939–1941 | Succeeded by Lucien J. Maciora |
| Preceded by Lucien J. Maciora | Member of the U.S. House of Representatives from Connecticut's at-large congressional district 1943–1945 | Succeeded by Joseph F. Ryter |
