= 1998 United States House of Representatives elections in Connecticut =

- November 3, 1998

All 6 Connecticut seats to the United States House of Representatives
- Turnout: 56.59%
	Majority party	Minority party
Party	Democratic	Republican
Last election	4	2
Seats won	4	2
Seat change	Steady	Steady
Popular vote	495,557	442,066
Percentage	51.92%	46.32%
Swing	▼3.98%	▲4.05%

Democratic
40–50%
50–60%
60–70%
70–80%
80–90%
Republican
40–50%
50–60%
60–70%
70–80%
80–90%

The 1998 United States House of Representatives elections in Connecticut were held on November 3, 1998, to elect the six members of the U.S. House, one from each of the state's congressional districts, to represent Connecticut in the 106th Congress. These elections coincided with a gubernatorial election, a U.S. Senate election, as well as elections to the state legislature.

All seats were successfully defended by both parties, meaning the 4-2 Democratic delegation was maintained.

== Overview ==
United States House of Representatives elections in Connecticut, 1998
Party	Votes	Percentage	Seats	+/–
Democratic	495,557	51.92%	4	0
Republican	442,066	46.32%	2	0
Concerned Citizens	5,929	0.62%	0	0
Independence	5,116	0.54%	0	0
Term Limits	3,045	0.32%	0	0
Libertarian	1,449	0.15%	0	0
Reform	676	0.07%	0	0
Natural Law	620	0.06%	0	0
Totals	954,458	100.00%	6	—

Popular vote
Democratic	51.92%
Republican	46.32%

House seats
Democratic	66.7%
Republican	33.3%

== District 1 ==
1998 Connecticut's 1st congressional district election
- Turnout: 60.52%
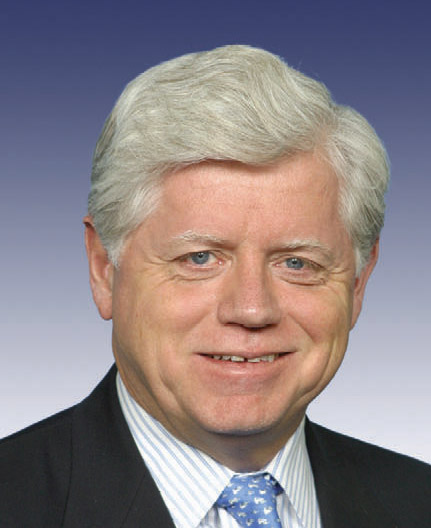

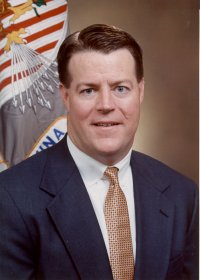
Nominee	John B. Larson	Kevin O'Connor
Party	Democratic	Republican
Popular vote	97,681	69,668
Percentage	58.05%	41.40%
- Municipality results Larson 50–60% 60–70% 70–80% O'Connor 40–50% 50–60%
U.S. Representative before election
Barbara Kennelly
Democratic
Elected U.S. Representative
John B. Larson
Democratic

Incumbent Democrat Barbara Kennelly, originally elected in 1982, retired to run for Governor. After winning the Democratic primary, former state Senator John B. Larson defeated Republican nominee Kevin O'Connor with 58% of the vote.

=== Democratic primary ===
==== Candidates ====
===== Nominee =====
- John B. Larson, former state Senator from the 3rd district (1983-1995) and candidate for governor in 1994

===== Eliminated in primary =====
- Miles S. Rapoport, Connecticut Secretary of State from West Hartford
- Jim McCavanagh, state representative from the 12th district
- Joseph M. Suggs Jr., former Connecticut State Treasurer (1993-1995)

==== Convention ====
According to 1993 Connecticut law, a candidate must receive 15% of delegate support on any ballot to force a primary. To officially win the party endorsement, a majority of delegate support was needed, or 51%.

July 13 Democratic convention (All 282 delegates)
Candidate	1st Ballot		2nd Ballot	
Candidate	Votes	%	Votes	%
Larson	104	36.9%	140	49.7%
Rapoport	80	28.3%	88	31.2%
McCavanagh	53	18.8%	41	14.5%
Suggs	45	16.0%	13	4.6%
Inactive Ballots	0 ballots		0 ballots	

==== Primary results ====
This was the first Democratic primary election held in the 1st district since Emilio Daddario retired to run for governor in 1970.

Results by municipality: Larson: 40–50%; 50–60%; 70–80%; Rapoport: 40–50%; 50–60%; 60–70%

September 15, 1998 Democratic primary
Party	Candidate	Votes	%
Democratic	John B. Larson	19,877	46.42%
Democratic	Miles S. Rapoport	18,189	42.48%
Democratic	Jim McCavanagh	2,565	6.00%
Democratic	Joseph M. Suggs Jr.	2,185	5.10%
Total votes		42,816	100.00%

=== General election ===
==== Polling ====
Poll source	Date(s)	Sample size	Margin of error	Kevin O'Connor (R)	John Larson (D)	Other / undecided (Note: Calculated by taking the difference of 100% and all other candidates combined.)
Mason-Dixon Polling & Strategy	October 25, 1998	308	—	21%	55%	24%

==== Results ====
1998 Connecticut's 1st congressional district election
Party	Candidate	Votes	%
Democratic	John B. Larson	97,681	58.05%
Republican	Kevin O'Connor	69,668	41.40%
Term Limits	Jay E. Palmieri IV	915	0.55%
Total votes		168,264	100.00%
Democratic hold			

== District 2 ==
1998 Connecticut's 2nd congressional district election
- Turnout: 57.56%
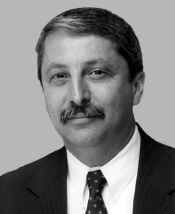

Nominee	Sam Gejdenson	Gary M. Koval
Party	Democratic	Republican
Popular vote	99,567	57,860
Percentage	61.0%	35.5%
- Municipality results Gejdenson 40–50% 50–60% 60–70% 70–80% Koval 40–50%
U.S. Representative before election
Sam Gejdenson
Democratic
Elected U.S. Representative
Sam Gejdenson
Democratic

Incumbent Democrat Sam Gejdenson won re-election to a tenth term against Republican nominee Gary M. Koval, a businessman from Mansfield.

Results

1998 Connecticut's 2nd congressional district election
Party	Candidate	Votes	%
Democratic	Sam Gejdenson (incumbent)	99,567	61.01%
Republican	Gary M. Koval	57,860	35.45%
Independent Party	Dianne G. Ondusko	5,116	3.14%
Term Limits	Paul W. Cook	658	0.40%
Total votes		163,201	100.00%
Democratic hold			

== District 3 ==
1998 Connecticut's 3rd congressional district election
- Turnout: 53.32%
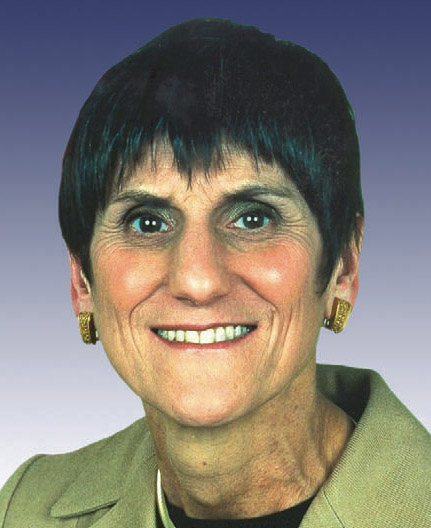

Nominee	Rosa DeLauro	Martin Reust
Party	Democratic	Republican
Popular vote	109,726	42,090
Percentage	71.32%	27.36%
- Municipality results DeLauro 50–60% 60–70% 70–80% 80–90%
U.S. Representative before election
Rosa DeLauro
Democratic
Elected U.S. Representative
Rosa DeLauro
Democratic

Incumbent Democrat Rosa DeLauro won re-election to a fifth term, defeating Republican nominee and Madison businessman Martin Reust with 71.3% of the vote.

Results

1998 Connecticut's 3rd congressional district election
Party	Candidate	Votes	%
Democratic	Rosa DeLauro (incumbent)	109,726	71.32%
Republican	Martin T. Reust	42,090	27.36%
Term Limits	Kristen J. Abbatiello	739	0.48%
Reform	David P. Cole	676	0.44%
Natural Law	Gail J. Dalby	620	0.40%
Total votes		153,851	100.00%
Democratic hold			

== District 4 ==
1998 Connecticut's 4th congressional district election
- Turnout: 52.84%
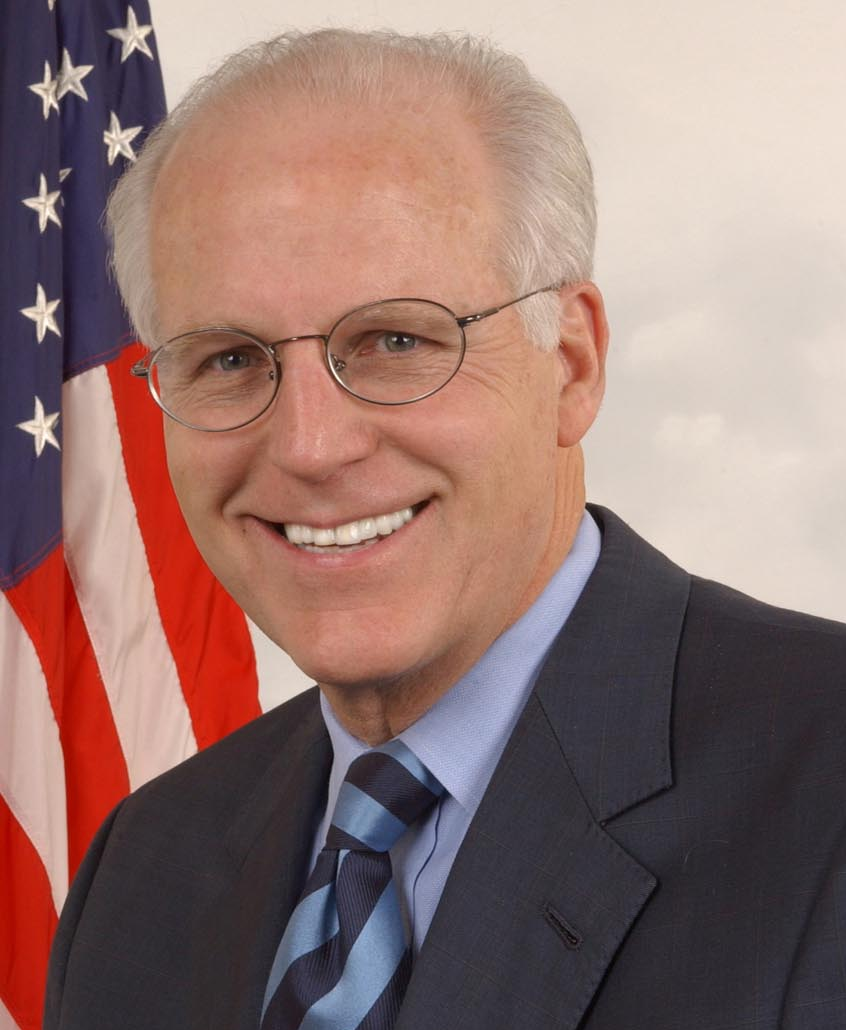

Nominee	Chris Shays	Jonathan D. Kantrowitz
Party	Republican	Democratic
Popular vote	94,767	40,988
Percentage	69.07%	29.87%
- Municipality results Shays 60–70% 70-80% 80-90% Kantrowitz 50–60%
U.S. Representative before election
Chris Shays
Republican
Elected U.S. Representative
Chris Shays
Republican

Incumbent Republican Christopher Shays, originally elected in 1987, defeated Fairfield businessman and 1994 nominee Jonathan D. Kantrowitz with 69% of the vote.

Results

1998 Connecticut's 4th congressional district election
Party	Candidate	Votes	%
Republican	Chris Shays (incumbent)	94,767	69.07%
Democratic	Jonathan Kantrowitz	40,988	29.87%
Libertarian	Marshall C. Harrison	1,449	1.06%
Total votes		137,204	100.00%
Republican hold			

== District 5 ==
1998 Connecticut's 5th congressional district election
- Turnout: 56.23%
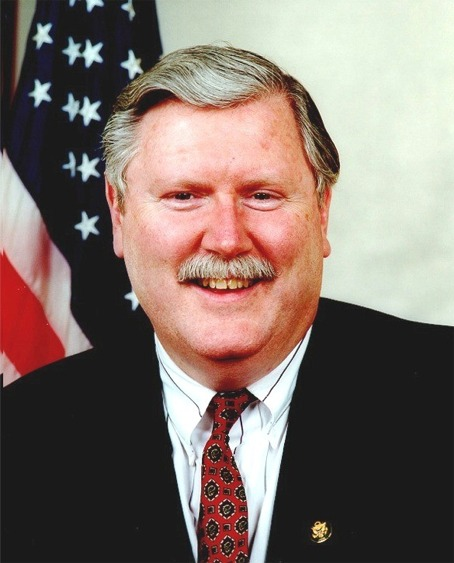

Nominee	Jim Maloney	Mark Nielsen
Party	Democratic	Republican
Popular vote	78,394	76,051
Percentage	49.88%	48.39%
- Municipality results Maloney 50–60% 60–70% Nielsen 40–50% 50–60% 60–70%
U.S. Representative before election
James H. Maloney
Democratic
Elected U.S. Representative
James H. Maloney
Democratic

Incumbent Democrat Jim Maloney narrowly won re-election to a second term, defeating Republican nominee Mark Nielsen, a state Senator from Danbury.

=== Republican primary ===
==== Candidates ====
===== Nominee =====
- Mark Nielsen, state Senator from the 24th district

===== Defeated at convention =====
- Alan Schlesinger, former state Representative from the 114th district (1981-1993), former Mayor of Derby (1994-1998), and candidate for this seat in 1984 and 1990

==== Convention ====
July 20, 1998 Republican convention
Candidate	1st Ballot	
Candidate	Votes	%
Nielsen	169	73.8%
Schlesinger	60	26.2%
Inactive Ballots	1 ballot	

=== General election ===
==== Results ====
1998 Connecticut's 5th congressional district election
Party	Candidate	Votes	%
Democratic	Jim Maloney (incumbent)	78,394	49.88%
Republican	Mark Nielsen	76,051	48.39%
Concerned Citizens	Robert V. Strasdauskas	2,712	1.73%
Total votes		157,157	100.00%
Democratic hold			

== District 6 ==
1998 Connecticut's 6th congressional district election
- Turnout: 58.92%
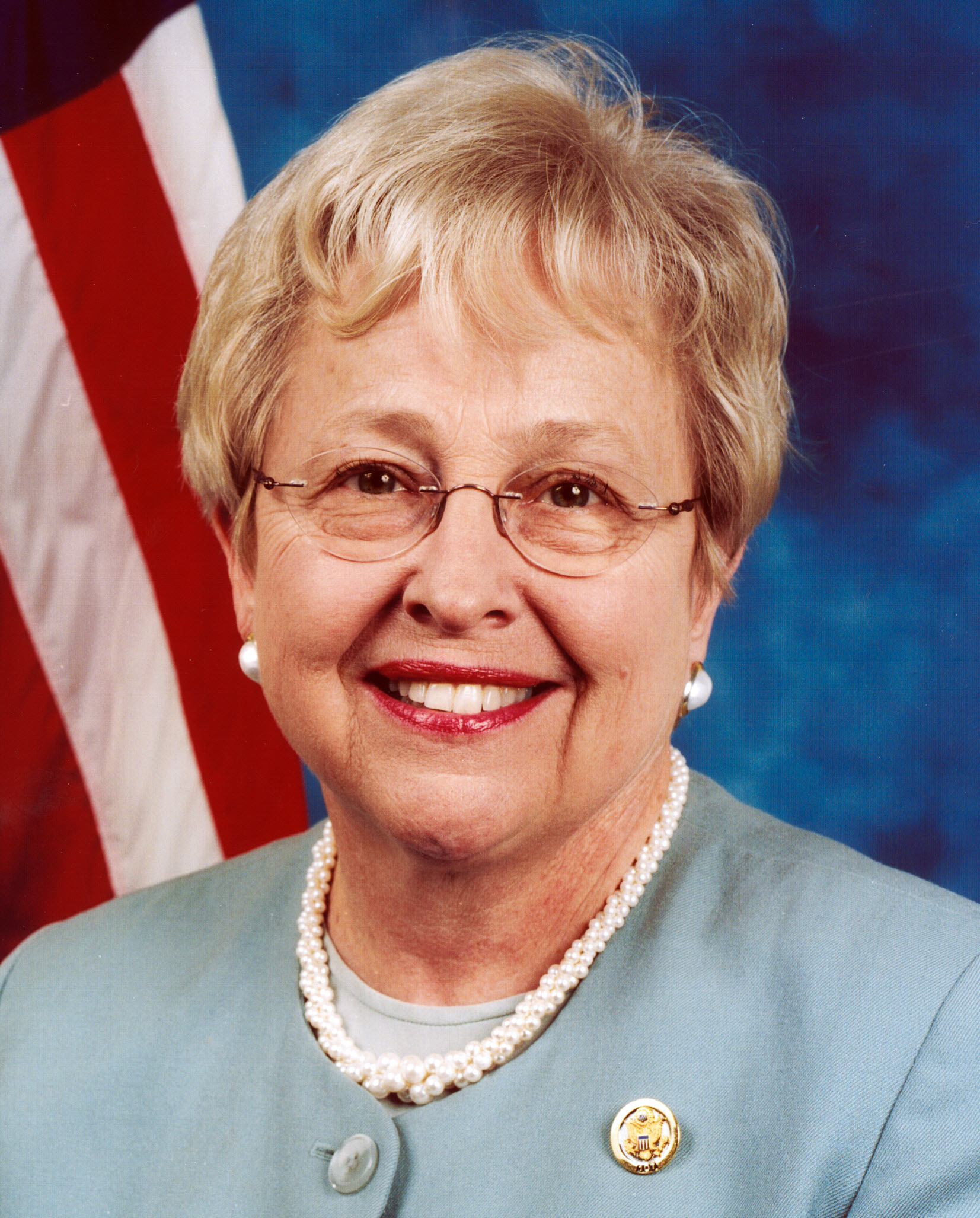

Nominee	Nancy Johnson	Charlotte Koskoff
Party	Republican	Democratic
Popular vote	101,630	69,201
Percentage	58.15%	39.59%
- Municipality results Johnson 50–60% 60–70% Koskoff 40–50% 50–60%
U.S. Representative before election
Nancy Johnson
Republican
Elected U.S. Representative
Nancy Johnson
Republican

Incumbent Republican Nancy Johnson, originally elected in 1982, won re-election to a ninth term, defeating Democratic nominee Charlotte Koskoff with 58.15%, a significant overperformance from 1996.

Results

1998 Connecticut's 6th congressional district election
Party	Candidate	Votes	%
Republican	Nancy Johnson (incumbent)	101,630	58.15%
Democratic	Charlotte Koskoff	69,201	39.59%
Concerned Citizens	Timothy A. Knibbs	3,217	1.84%
Term Limits	Mark J. Polon	733	0.42%
Total votes		174,781	100.00%
Republican hold			
