= Electoral history of Chris Dodd =

Overview of Christopher Dodd's electoral history

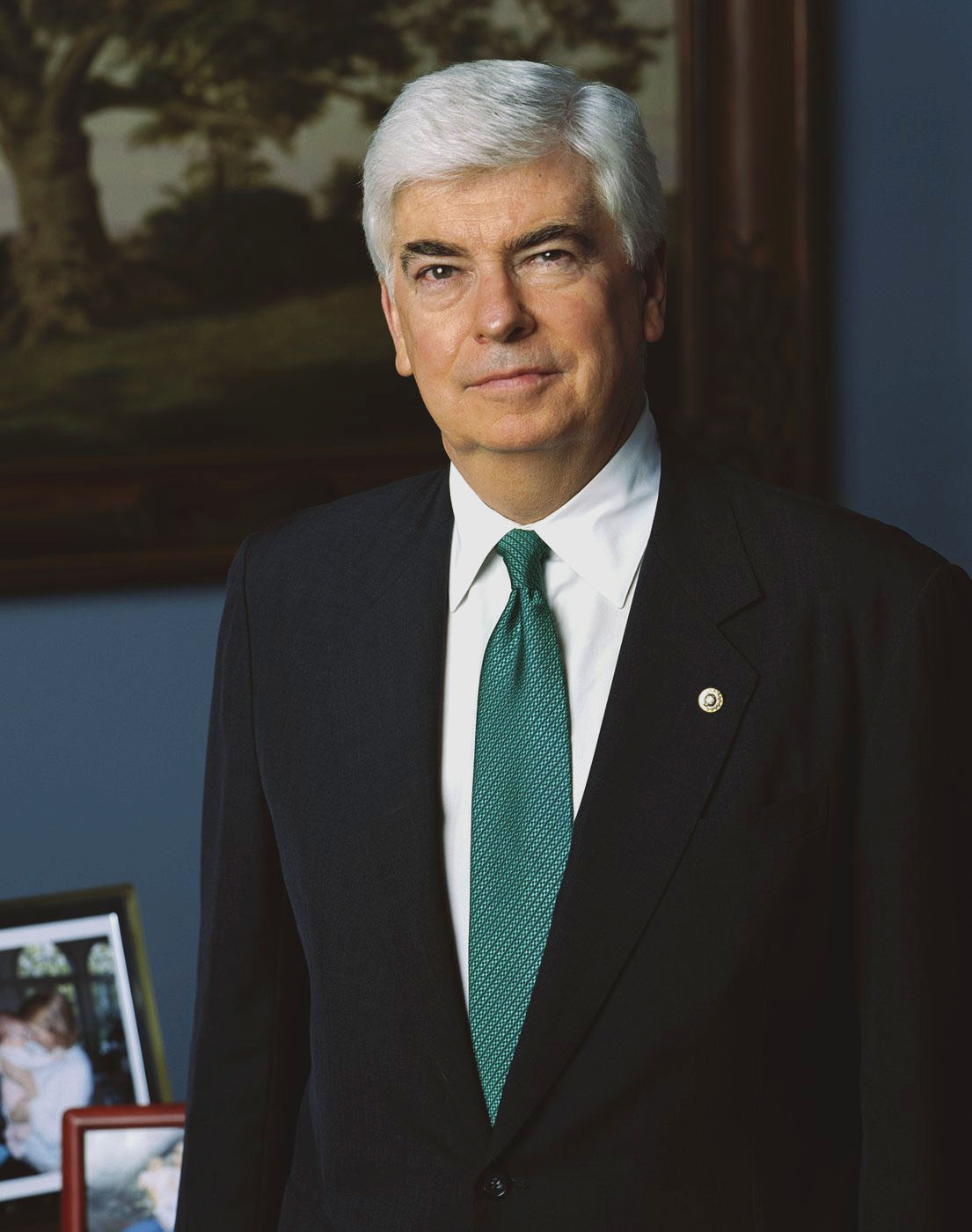
Senator Christopher Dodd (D-CT)

Electoral history of Christopher Dodd, senior United States senator from Connecticut (1981–2011), United States Representative (1975–1981), Democratic National Committee chairman (1995–1997) and a candidate for the 2008 Democratic presidential nomination

== U.S. House elections ==
Connecticut's 2nd congressional district, 1974:

- Christopher Dodd (D) – 104,436 (59.02%)
- Samuel B. Hellier (R) – 69,380 (39.21%)
- Anthony Discepolo (I) – 3,124 (1.77%)

Connecticut's 2nd congressional district, 1976:

- Christopher Dodd (D) (inc.) – 142,684 (65.07%)
- Richard Jackson (R) – 74,743 (34.09%)
- Anthony Discepolo (I) – 1,857 (0.85%)

Connecticut's 2nd congressional district, 1978:

- Christopher Dodd (D) (inc.) – 116,624 (69.91%)
- Thomas Hudson Connell (R) – 50,167 (30.07%)
- Others (write-ins) – 23 (0.01%)

== U.S. Senate elections ==
1980 Connecticut United States Senate election:

- Christopher Dodd (D) – 763,969 (56.34%)
- James L. Buckley (R) – 581,884 (42.91%)
- Jerry Brennan (LBT) – 5,336 (0.39%)
- Andrew J. Zemel (Concerned Citizens) – 4,772 (0.35%)
- Others (write-ins) – 114 (0.01%)

1986 Connecticut United States Senate election:

- Christopher Dodd (D) (inc.) – 632,695 (64.76%)
- Roger W. Eddy (R) – 340,438 (34.85%)
- Edward J. McCallum, Jr. (I) – 3,800 (0.39%)

1992 Connecticut United States Senate election:

- Christopher Dodd (D) (inc.) – 882,569 (58.81%)
- Brook Johnson (R) – 572,036 (38.12%)
- Richard D. Gregory (Concerned Citizens) – 35,315 (2.35%)
- Howard A. Grayson, Jr. (LBT) – 10,741 (0.72%)

1998 Connecticut United States Senate election:

- Christopher Dodd (D) (inc.) – 628,306 (65.15%)
- Gary Franks (R) – 312,177 (32.37%)
- William Kozak, Jr. (Concerned Citizens) – 12,261 (1.27%)
- Lois A. Grasso (Term Limits) – 6,517 (0.68%)
- Wildey J. Moore (LBT) – 5,196 (0.54%)

2004 Connecticut United States Senate election:

- Christopher Dodd (D) (inc.) – 945,347 (66.35%)
- Jack Orchulli (R) – 457,749 (32.13%)
- Timothy A. Knibbs (Concerned Citizens) – 12,442 (0.87%)
- Lenny Rasch (LBT) (write-in) – 9,188 (0.65%)

== Presidential elections ==
2008 New Hampshire Democratic Vice Presidential primary:

- Raymond Stebbins – 50,485 (46.93%)
- William Bryk – 22,965 (21.35%)
- John Edwards* – 10,553 (9.81%)
- Barack Obama* – 6,402 (5.95%)
- Bill Richardson* – 5,525 (5.14%)
- Hillary Clinton* – 3,419 (3.18%)
- Joe Biden* – 1,512 (1.41%)
- Al Gore* – 966 (0.90%)
- Dennis Kucinich* – 762 (0.71%)
- Bill Clinton* – 388 (0.36%)
- John McCain* – 293 (0.27%)
- Christopher Dodd* – 224 (0.21%)
- Ron Paul* – 176 (0.16%)
- Jack Barnes, Jr.* – 95 (0.09%)
- Mike Gravel* – 91 (0.09%)
- Joe Lieberman* – 67 (0.06%)
- Mitt Romney* – 66 (0.06%)
- Mike Huckabee* – 63 (0.06%)
- Rudy Giuliani* – 46 (0.04%)
- Darrel Hunter* – 20 (0.02%)

(* – write-in candidate)

2008 Democratic presidential primaries:

Excluding penalized contests, only primary and caucuses votes:

- Barack Obama – 16,706,853
- Hillary Clinton – 16,239,821
- John Edwards* – 742,010
- Bill Richardson* – 89,054
- Uncommitted – 82,660
- Dennis Kucinich* – 68,482
- Joe Biden* – 64,041
- Mike Gravel* – 27,662
- Christopher Dodd* – 25,300
- Others – 22,556

Including penalized contests:

- Hillary Clinton – 18,225,175 (48.03%)
- Barack Obama – 17,988,182 (47.41%)
- John Edwards* – 1,006,275 (2.65%)
- Uncommitted – 299,610 (0.79%)
- Bill Richardson* – 106,073 (0.28%)
- Dennis Kucinich* – 103,994 (0.27%)
- Joe Biden* – 81,641 (0.22%)
- Scattering – 44,348 (0.12%)
- Mike Gravel* – 40,251 (0.11%)
- Christopher Dodd* – 35,281 (0.09%)

(* – dropped out from race)

== Leadership election ==
United States Senate Minority Leader (Democratic), 1994:

- Tom Daschle – 24
- Christopher Dodd – 23
