= 2000 United States House of Representatives elections in Connecticut =

- November 7, 2000

All 6 Connecticut seats to the United States House of Representatives
- Turnout: 77.54%
	Majority party	Minority party
Party	Democratic	Republican
Last election	4	2
Seats won	3	3
Seat change	▼1	▲1
Popular vote	699,237	594,830
Percentage	53.23%	45.29%
Swing	▲1.31%	▼1.03%

Democratic hold
Republican hold Republican gain
Democratic
40–50%
50–60%
60–70%
70–80%
80–90%
Republican
50–60%
60–70%
70–80%
80–90%

The 2000 United States House of Representatives elections in Connecticut were held on November 7, 2000, to elect the six members of the U.S. House, one from each of the state's congressional districts, to represent Connecticut in the 107th Congress. These elections coincided with a U.S. presidential election, a U.S. Senate election, as well as elections to the state legislature.

Republicans flipped the 2nd district held by Democrat Sam Gejdenson. All other incumbents ran for and won reelection.

== Overview ==
United States House of Representatives elections in Connecticut, 2000
Party	Votes	Percentage	Seats	+/–
Democratic	699,237	53.23%	3	-1
Republican	594,830	45.29%	3	+1
Concerned Citizens	7,724	0.59%	0	0
Green	7,303	0.56%	0	0
Libertarian	2,034	0.15%	0	0
Natural Law	1,258	0.10%	0	0
Independence	1,097	0.08%	0	0
Write-in candidates	7	0.00%	0	0
Totals	1,313,490	100.00%	6	—

Popular vote
Democratic	53.23%
Republican	45.29%

House seats
Democratic	50%
Republican	50%

== District 1 ==
2000 Connecticut's 1st congressional district election
- Turnout: 77.73%
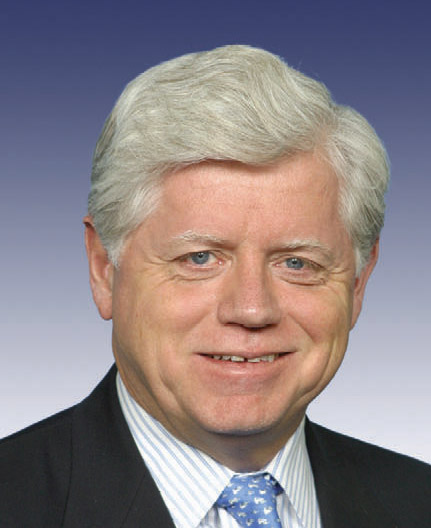

Nominee	John B. Larson	Bob Backlund
Party	Democratic	Republican
Popular vote	151,932	59,331
Percentage	71.92%	28.08%
- Municipality results Larson 50–60% 60–70% 70–80% 80–90%
U.S. Representative before election
John B. Larson
Democratic
Elected U.S. Representative
John B. Larson
Democratic

Incumbent Democrat John B. Larson, originally elected in 1998, won re-election to a second term, defeating Republican nominee and professional wrestler Bob Backlund.

Results

2000 Connecticut's 1st congressional district election
Party	Candidate	Votes	%
Democratic	John B. Larson (incumbent)	151,932	71.92%
Republican	Bob Backlund	59,331	28.08%
Total votes		211,263	100.00%
Democratic hold			

== District 2 ==
2000 Connecticut's 2nd congressional district election
- Turnout: 77.45%
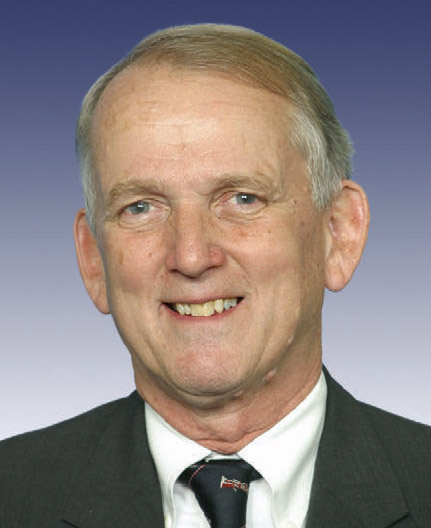

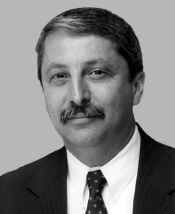
Nominee	Rob Simmons	Sam Gejdenson
Party	Republican	Democratic
Alliance	Independence
Popular vote	114,380	111,520
Percentage	50.63%	49.37%
- Municipality results Simmons 50–60% 60–70% 70-80% Gejdenson 50–60% 60–70%
U.S. Representative before election
Sam Gejdenson
Democratic
Elected U.S. Representative
Rob Simmons
Republican

Incumbent Democrat Sam Gejdenson, originally elected in 1980, ran for re-election to an 11th term, but was narrowly defeated by Republican nominee Rob Simmons.

Results

2000 Connecticut's 2nd congressional district election
Party	Candidate	Votes	%
Republican	Rob Simmons	114,380	50.63%
Democratic	Sam Gejdenson (incumbent)	111,520	49.37%
Total votes		225,900	100.00%
Republican gain from Democratic			

== District 3 ==
2000 Connecticut's 3rd congressional district election
- Turnout: 76.28%
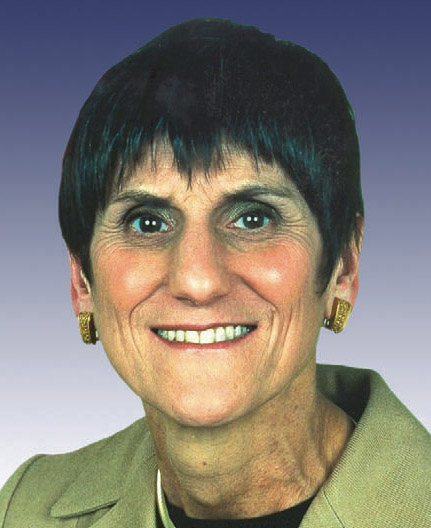

Nominee	Rosa DeLauro	June M. Gold
Party	Democratic	Republican
Popular vote	156,910	60,037
Percentage	71.9%	27.5%
- Municipality results DeLauro 50–60% 60–70% 70–80% 80–90%
U.S. Representative before election
Rosa DeLauro
Democratic
Elected U.S. Representative
Rosa DeLauro
Democratic

Incumbent Democrat Rosa DeLauro won re-election to a sixth term, defeating Republican nominee June M. Gold.

Results

2000 Connecticut's 3rd congressional district election
Party	Candidate	Votes	%
Democratic	Rosa DeLauro (incumbent)	156,910	71.91%
Republican	June M. Gold	60,037	27.51%
Natural Law	Gail J. Dalby	1,258	0.58%
Total votes		218,205	100.00%
Democratic hold			

== District 4 ==
2000 Connecticut's 4th congressional district election
- Turnout: 78.63%
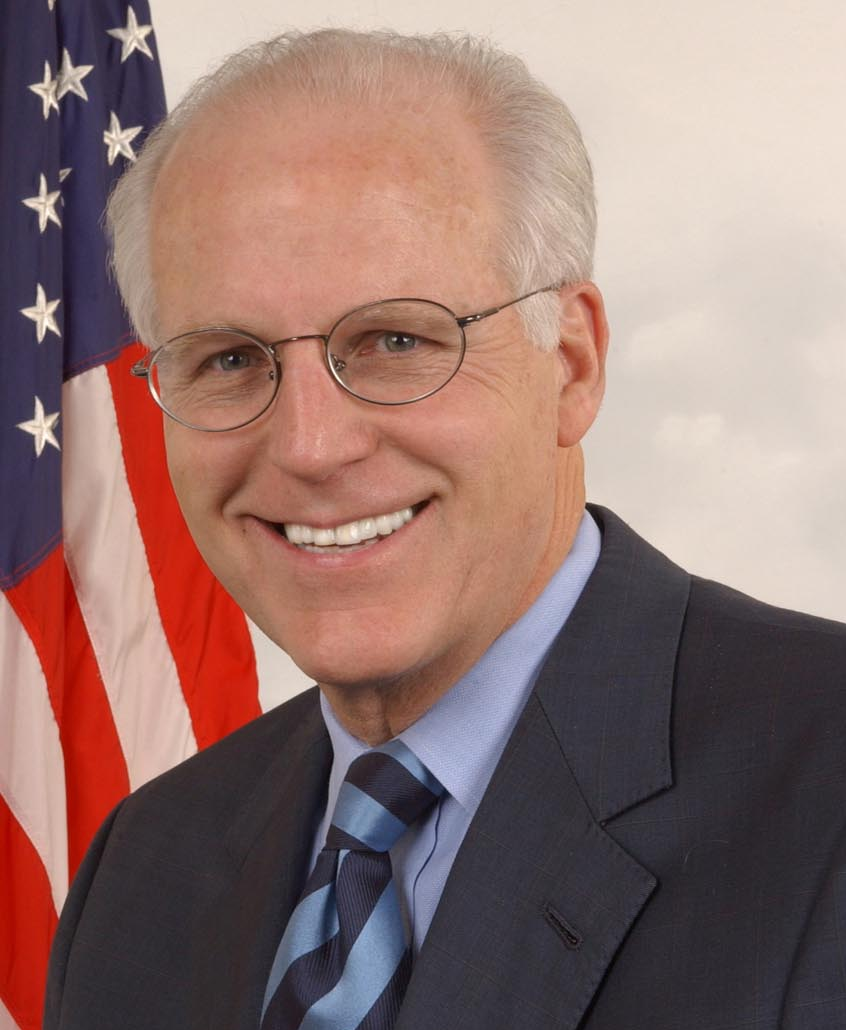

Nominee	Chris Shays	Stephanie Sanchez
Party	Republican	Democratic
Popular vote	119,155	84,472
Percentage	57.63%	40.86%
- Municipality results Shays 50–60% 60–70% 70-80% Sanchez 60–70%
U.S. Representative before election
Chris Shays
Republican
Elected U.S. Representative
Chris Shays
Republican

Incumbent Republican Chris Shays, originally elected in 1987, won re-election to a seventh full term, defeating Democratic nominee and Greenwich selectwoman Stephanie Sanchez.

Results

2000 Connecticut's 4th congressional district election
Party	Candidate	Votes	%
Republican	Chris Shays (incumbent)	119,155	57.63%
Democratic	Stephanie Sanchez	84,472	40.86%
Libertarian	Daniel Gislao	2,034	0.98%
Independent Party	Frank M. Don	1,097	0.53%
Total votes		206,758	100.00%
Republican hold			

== District 5 ==
2000 Connecticut's 5th congressional district election
- Turnout: 77.61%
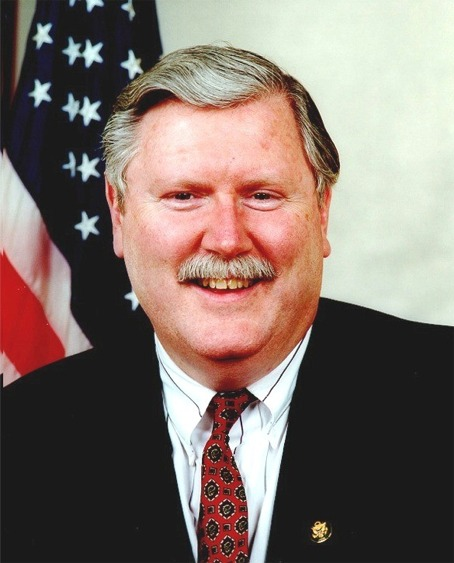

Nominee	Jim Maloney	Mark Nielsen
Party	Democratic	Republican
Popular vote	118,932	98,229
Percentage	53.62%	44.28%
- Municipality results Maloney 40–50% 50–60% 60–70% Nielsen 50–60%
U.S. Representative before election
Jim Maloney
Democratic
Elected U.S. Representative
Jim Maloney
Democratic

Incumbent Democrat Jim Maloney, originally elected in 1996, won re-election to a third term in a rematch against former state Senator Mark Nielsen.

Results

2000 Connecticut's 5th congressional district election
Party	Candidate	Votes	%
Democratic	Jim Maloney (incumbent)	118,932	53.62%
Republican	Mark Nielsen	98,229	44.28%
Concerned Citizens	Joseph A. Zdonczyk	4,653	2.10%
Write-in	John M. Joy	7	0.00%
Total votes		221,821	100.00%
Democratic hold			

== District 6 ==
2000 Connecticut's 6th congressional district election
- Turnout: 77.60%
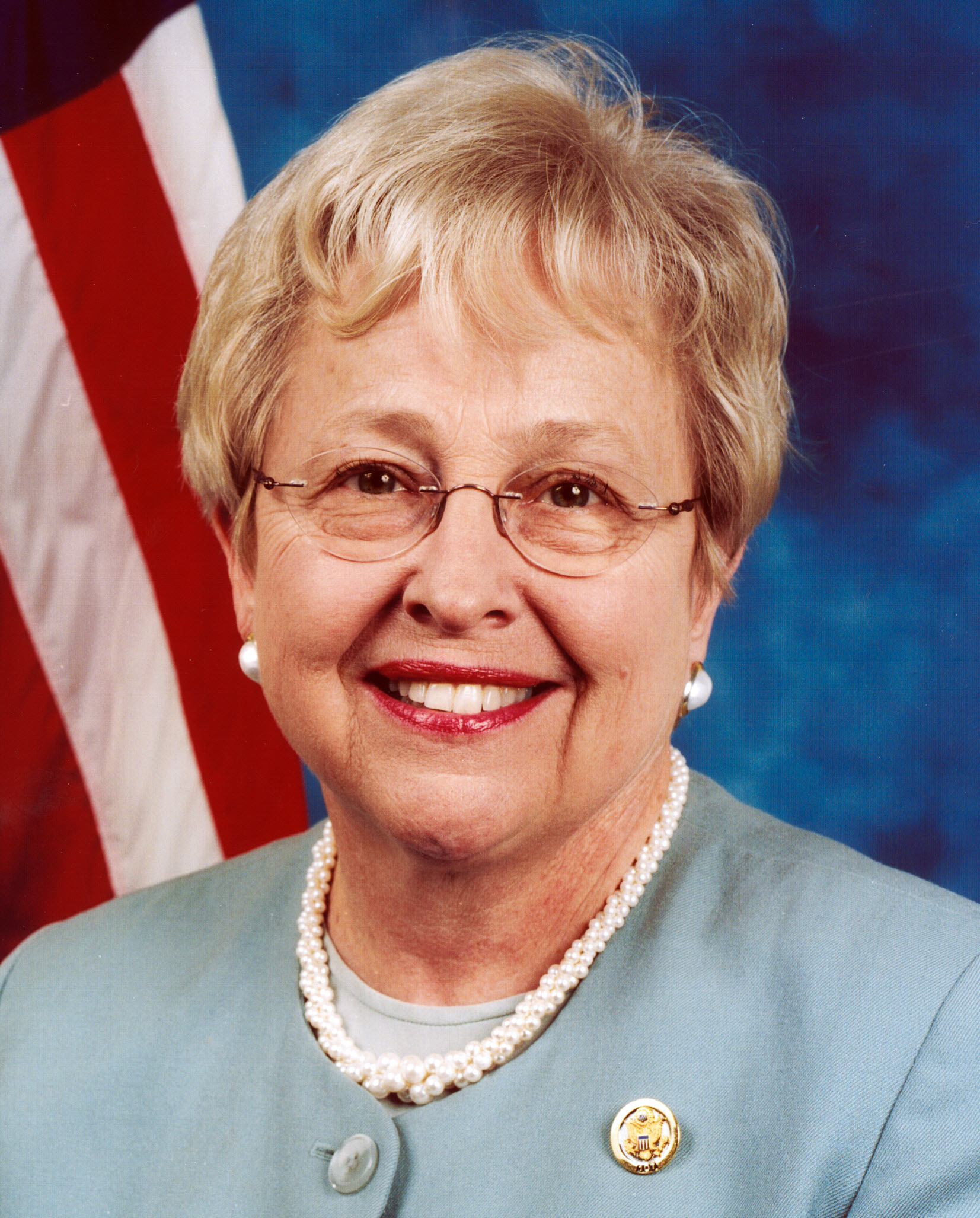

Nominee	Nancy Johnson	Paul Valenti
Party	Republican	Democratic
Popular vote	143,698	75,471
Percentage	62.60%	32.88%
- Municipality results Johnson 50–60% 60–70% 70-80% 80-90% Valenti 50–60%
U.S. Representative before election
Nancy Johnson
Republican
Elected U.S. Representative
Nancy Johnson
Republican

Incumbent Republican Nancy Johnson, originally elected in 1982, won re-election to a tenth term, defeating Democratic nominee and Watertown attorney Paul Valenti.

Results

2000 Connecticut's 6th congressional district election
Party	Candidate	Votes	%
Republican	Nancy Johnson (incumbent)	143,698	62.60%
Democratic	Paul Valenti	75,471	32.88%
Green	Audrey A. Cole	7,303	3.18%
Concerned Citizens	Timothy A. Knibbs	3,071	1.34%
Total votes		229,543	100.00%
Republican hold			
