= Connecticut's 24th State Senate district =

American legislative district

Senator
Julie Kushner; D

Connecticut's 24th State Senate district elects one member of the Connecticut State Senate. It consists of the communities of Danbury, New Fairfield, Sherman, and parts of Bethel. It has been represented by Democrat Julie Kushner since 2019.

== List of senators ==
Senators	Party	Years	District home	Note
Howard A. Hueston	Republican	1961 – 1963	Sherman	
T. Clark Hull	Republican	1963 – 1971	Danbury	Later served as Lieutenant Governor
Romeo G. Petroni	Republican	1971 – 1975	Ridgefield	
Wayne A. Baker	Democratic	1975 – 1985	Danbury	
Robert T. Miller	Republican	1985 – 1987	New Fairfield	
James H. Maloney	Democratic	1987 – 1995	Danbury	Later served in the United States Congress
Mark Nielsen	Republican	1995 – 1999	Danbury	Unsuccessfully ran for the United States Congress
David Cappiello	Republican	1999 – 2009	Danbury	Unsuccessfully ran for the United States Congress
Michael A. McLachlan	Republican	2009 – 2019	Danbury	
Julie Kushner	Democratic	2019 – present	Danbury	

== Recent elections ==
=== 2020 ===
2020 Connecticut State Senate election, District 24
Party	Candidate	Votes	%
Democratic	Julie Kushner (incumbent)	23,939	53.63
Republican	Susan Chapman	18,778	42.07
Independent Party	Susan Chapman	827	1.85
Working Families	Julie Kushner (incumbent)	1,091	2.44
Total votes		20,696	100.00
Democratic hold			

=== 2018 ===
2018 Connecticut State Senate election, District 24
Party	Candidate	Votes	%
Total	Julie Kushner	17,186	54.0
Democratic	Julie Kushner	16,400	51.5
Working Families	Julie Kushner	786	2.5
Total	Michael A. McLachlan (incumbent)	14,658	46.0
Republican	Michael A. McLachlan	14,077	44.2
Independent	Michael A. McLachlan	581	1.8
Total votes		31,844	100.0
Democratic gain from Republican			

=== 2016 ===
2016 Connecticut State Senate election, District 24
Party	Candidate	Votes	%
Republican	Michael A. McLachlan (incumbent)	20,501	52.24
Democratic	Kenneth Gucker	18,745	47.76
Total votes		39,246	100.00
Republican hold			

=== 2014 ===
2014 Connecticut State Senate election, District 24
Party	Candidate	Votes	%
Republican	Michael A. McLachlan (incumbent)	13,392	74.7
Working Families	Theodore Feng	2,488	13.9
Independent Party	Susan Chapman	2,046	12.4
Total votes		17,926	100.00
Republican hold			

=== 2012 ===
2012 Connecticut State Senate election, District 24
Party	Candidate	Votes	%
Republican	Michael A. McLachlan (incumbent)	18,537	51.7
Democratic	Jason W. Bartlett	17,305	48.3
Total votes		35,842	100.00
Republican hold			
