= David Cappiello =

American politician

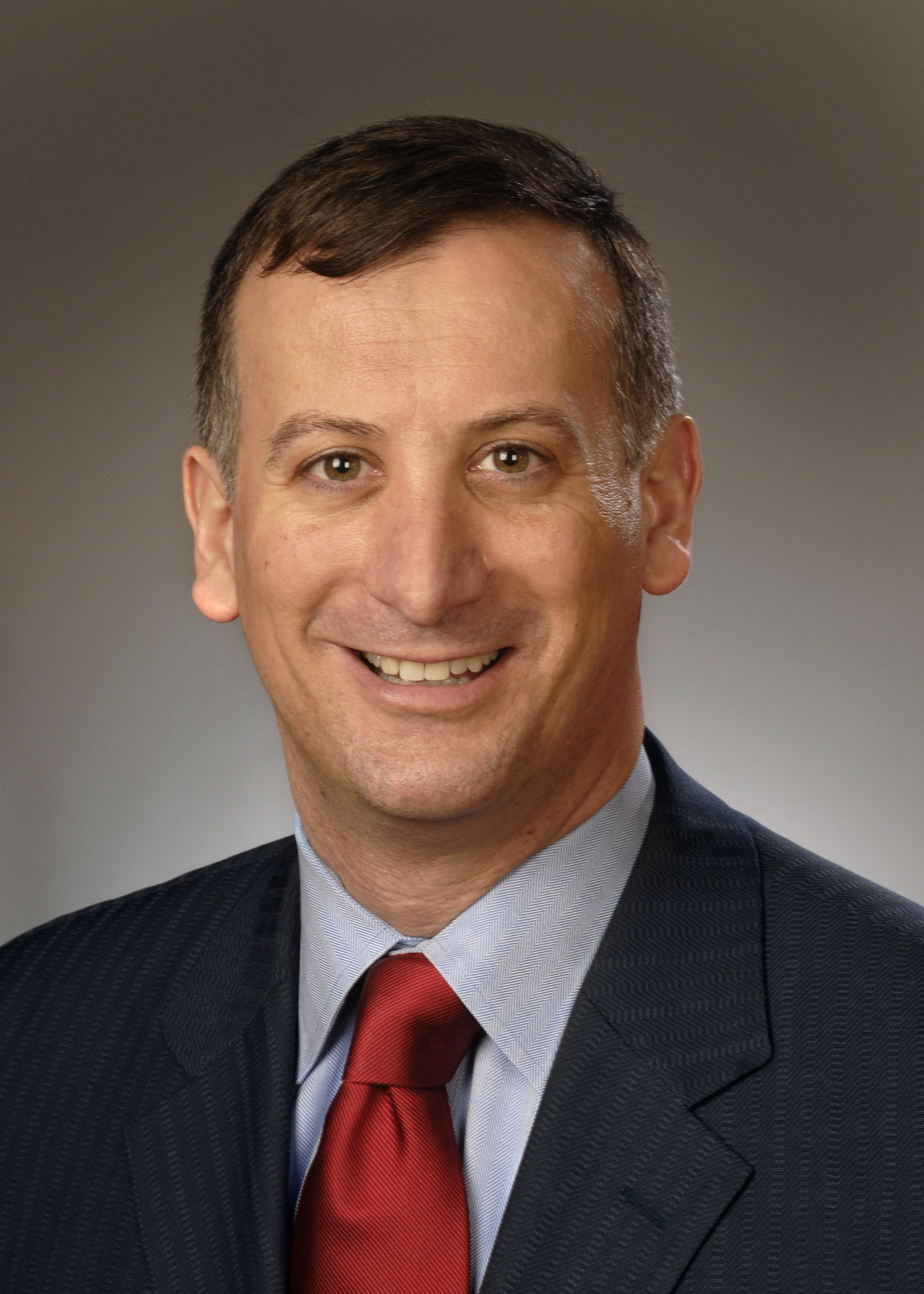

Member of the Connecticut State Senate from the 24th district
- In office 1999–2009
- Preceded by: Mark Nielsen
- Succeeded by: Michael A. McLachlan

Member of the Connecticut House of Representatives from the 138th district
- In office 1995–1999
- Preceded by: Mark Nielsen
- Succeeded by: Mark Boughton

Personal details
- Born: August 15, 1968 (age 58) Danbury, Connecticut
- Party: Republican
- Spouse: Christine Ciarleglio (m. 2002)
- Children: 2 Sons, Jack Reagan & Jude Francis
- Education: Western Connecticut State University, Immaculate High School, Danbury, Connecticut
- Website: Website

David J. Cappiello (born August 15, 1968) is a businessman and former State Senator representing Connecticut’s 24th Senate District, which includes the communities of Danbury, New Fairfield, Sherman, and part of Bethel. In the Senate, he served as Deputy Minority Leader and Ranking Member of the budget-writing Appropriations Committee.

== Early life, education, and family ==
Cappiello is a lifelong resident of the city of Danbury, Connecticut. He is a second-generation American, with his grandparents having migrated to the United States from Italy and Lebanon. In 1964, Cappiello’s father started Cappiello Jewelers, which remains to this day a family owned business on Main Street in Danbury. Senator Cappiello frequently cites his small business background as a major force in his political philosophy.

Cappiello is a graduate of Immaculate High School and attended Western Connecticut State University, both in Danbury. He was married in 2002 to Christine Ciarleglio, and the couple resides in Danbury with their two sons Jack Reagan and Jude Francis.

He is currently a mortgage loan officer for Flagstar Bank in Danbury.

== Political career and community involvement ==
Cappiello’s political career began in 1993 when at the age of 25, he was elected to the Danbury Common Council.

In 1994, he won election to the Connecticut House of Representatives in a contest for the 138th District seat being vacated by Republican Mark Nielsen, who was running for the State Senate. He was easily re-elected to the State House in 1996.

In 1998, Cappiello announced he was vacating his seat in the Connecticut House to run for the State Senate in the 24th District, where Mark Nielsen was retiring to challenge freshman Congressman James H. Maloney. He defeated Democrat Paul Estefan in a landslide, 62.24% to 37.76%, and was re-elected in 2000, 2002, 2004, and 2006.

In the legislature, Cappiello’s priorities included open space and environmental preservation, support for non-profit service providers, public safety, and health care reform. His legislative accomplishments include the state preservation of 130 acres (0.53 km^{2}) of open space land at the Bogus Farm in Bethel, a comprehensive legislative review of the State’s Homeland Security preparedness, and a law that requires all newborn babies be screened for life-threatening metabolic disorders. He also led the successful effort in 2008 to thwart a scheduled increase in the state’s gas tax. In 2006, Cappiello was honored by the AARP for his leadership in preserving prescription drug coverage for thousands of Connecticut senior citizens.

A strong fiscal conservative, Cappiello was tapped in 2005 to serve as the ranking Republican member of the General Assembly’s Appropriations Committee, which is responsible for writing the state’s biennial budget.

He is a fierce proponent of the state’s spending cap and a vocal critic of Connecticut's high tax burden, and has voted in opposition to four state budgets due to tax and spending increases. As ranking member of the budget panel, Cappiello was instrumental in the successful Republican effort of 2007 to pass a "no tax increase" budget, despite initial opposition from legislative Democrats.

Cappiello is heavily involved in many civic and cultural organizations, including the Danbury Lebanon American Club, Amerigo Vespucci Lodge, Danbury Lions Club, Danbury Land Trust, American Red Cross of Western Connecticut, Portuguese Cultural Center, and St. Anthony’s Maronite Church.

== 2008 Congressional race ==
On April 18, 2008, David Cappiello filed a campaign committee with the Federal Election Commission to challenge Democratic U.S. Representative Chris Murphy.

On May 10, 2008, Cappiello was officially chosen as the Republican nominee at the Fifth District nominating convention in Southbury. Cappiello’s candidacy drew the attention of the National Republican Congressional Committee and political observers.

The Washington Post’s political blogger Chris Cillizza named Cappiello one of the "Top 2008 Recruits", and in October 2007, Cappiello was included in the NRCC’s Challengers Helping Obtain the Majority Program (CHOMP) to help raise funds for select candidates challenging incumbent Democratic members of Congress.

On June 9, 2008, Cappiello announced his campaign had raised over $1,000,000 for his challenge to Murphy.

During the campaign, Cappiello focused on economic issues, both in his own policy statements and in his criticisms of his opponent’s record. He supported eliminating earmarks from the federal budget and extending the 2001 and 2003 tax cuts

Cappiello criticized Murphy on both accounts, pointing to Murphy’s failure to support a Congressional earmark moratorium despite claims during his 2006 campaign that he’d support ending the practice.

Cappiello supported lifting the ban on offshore oil and gas exploration, increased construction of nuclear power plants, and reform of the oil futures market in addition to conservation and renewable energy measures, calling American reliance on foreign oil "a matter of personal, economic, and national security.".

On Election Day, Cappiello was defeated by the incumbent Murphy.

== See also ==
- Connecticut's 5th congressional district
- United States House of Representatives elections, 2008

Connecticut House of Representatives
Preceded by Mark Nielsen	Member of the Connecticut House of Representatives from the 138th district 1995–1999	Succeeded by Mark Boughton
Connecticut State Senate
Preceded by Mark Nielsen	Member of the Connecticut State Senate from the 24th district 1999–2009	Succeeded by Michael A. McLachlan
Party political offices
Preceded by Nancy Johnson	Republican nominee for U.S. Congress for Connecticut's 5th district 2008 (lost)	Succeeded by Sam Caligiuri
