= Lawrence Anastasia =

American politician (1926–2008)

Lawrence J. Anastasia Jr.

Member of the Connecticut House of Representatives from the 138th district
- In office 1975–1993
- Preceded by: E. Ronald Bard
- Succeeded by: Mark Nielsen

Personal details
- Born: December 20, 1926 Norwalk, Connecticut, U.S.
- Died: July 24, 2008 (aged 81) Norwalk, Connecticut, U.S.
- Resting place: St. John Cemetery; Norwalk, Connecticut, U.S.
- Party: Democratic
- Spouse: Germaine Pouliot Anastasia
- Children: 5
- Education: University of Bridgeport

Military service
- Branch/service: United States Army
- Battles/wars: World War II; Korean War

Lawrence J. Anastasia Jr. (December 20, 1926 – July 24, 2008) was a member of the Connecticut House of Representatives for 18 years. He represented the 138th district. He also served on the Norwalk Common Council from 1967 to 1975.

== Early life ==
Anastasia was born and raised in Norwalk, Connecticut. He was the son of Lawrence J. Anastasia Sr. and Ida Christiano Anastasia. He was drafted into the US Army in 1944. He was the co-owner with his brother Peter of Anastasia Brothers, a grocery store on Newtown Avenue for 50 years.

== Political career ==
A Democrat, Anastasia served in the Connecticut House of Representatives from 1975 to 1993, representing the 138th district. He served on the Norwalk Common Council for 12 years. In 1992, the legislature redistricted Anastasia's residence, and he did not run for reelection.
