= 1992 United States Senate election in Connecticut =

- November 3, 1992
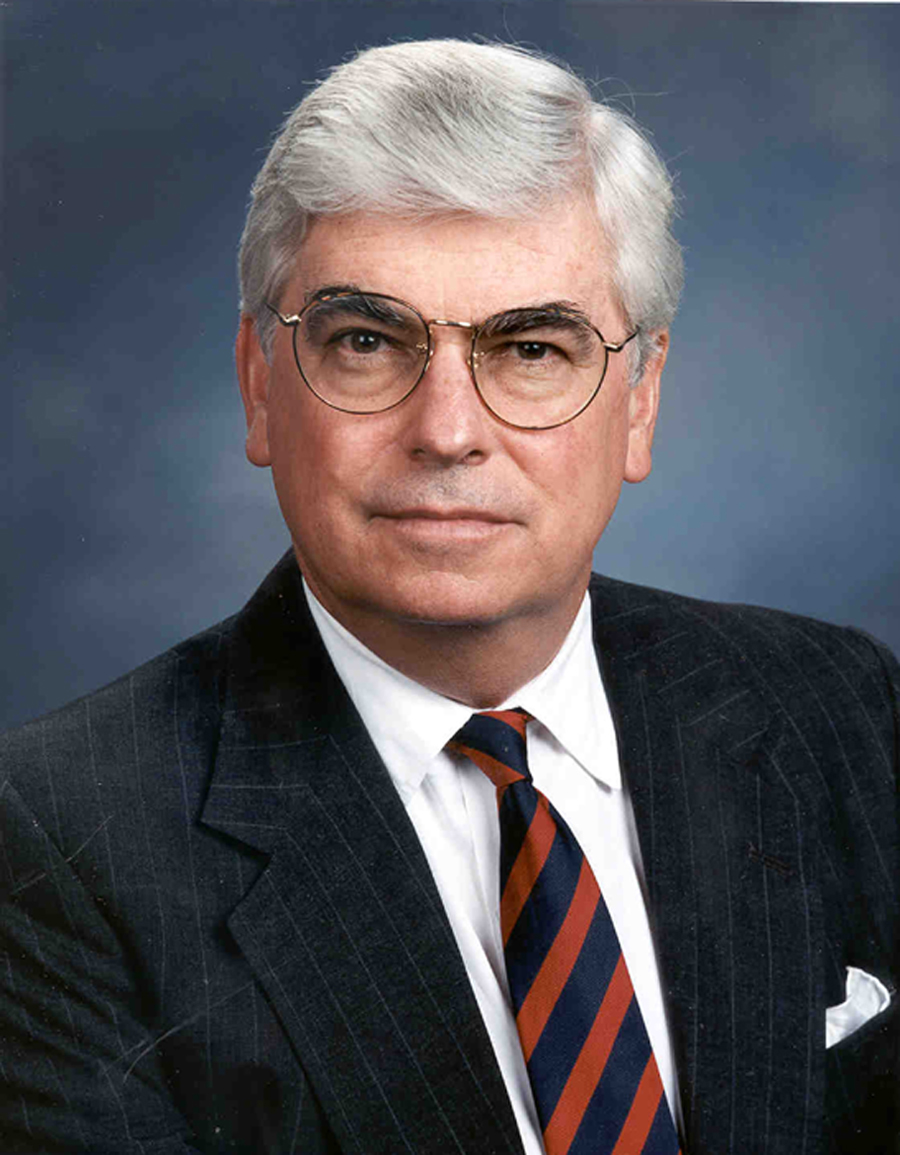

Nominee	Chris Dodd	Brook Johnson
Party	Democratic	Republican
Alliance	A Connecticut
Popular vote	882,569	572,036
Percentage	58.81%	38.12%
- Dodd: 40–50% 50–60% 60–70% 70–80% 80–90% Johnson: 40–50% 50–60% 60–70%
U.S. senator before election
Chris Dodd
Democratic
Elected U.S. Senator
Chris Dodd
Democratic

The 1992 United States Senate election in Connecticut took place on November 3, 1992, alongside other elections to the United States Senate in 34 other states, as well as with a presidential election and elections to the United States House of Representatives in all 50 states. Incumbent Democratic U.S. Senator Christopher Dodd won re-election for a third term.

== Major candidates ==
=== Democratic ===
- Christopher Dodd, incumbent U.S. Senator

=== Republican ===
- Brook Johnson, businessman
- Christopher Burnham, state representative

== Campaign ==
Johnson, a millionaire businessman who had never run for public office before, spent about $900,000 during the primary campaign. His television and radio commercials said that he would bring "a dose of success Washington needs." Dodd had $2 million cash on hand following the primaries.

== Results ==
Connecticut United States Senate election, 1992
Party	Candidate	Votes	%
Democratic	Christopher Dodd (incumbent)	882,569	58.81%
Republican	Brook Johnson	572,036	38.12%
Concerned Citizens	Richard D. Gregory	35,315	2.35%
Libertarian	Howard A. Grayson Jr.	10,741	0.72%
Total votes		1,500,661	100.00%
Democratic hold			

=== By congressional district ===
Dodd won all six congressional districts, including three that elected Republicans.

District	Dodd	Johnson	Representative
1st	64%	33%	Barbara Kennelly
2nd	60%	37%	Sam Gejdenson
3rd	62%	35%	Rosa DeLauro
4th	55%	42%	Chris Shays
5th	55%	42%	Gary Franks
6th	57%	39%	Nancy Johnson

== See also ==
- 1992 United States Senate elections
