= 1998 United States Senate election in Connecticut =

- November 3, 1998
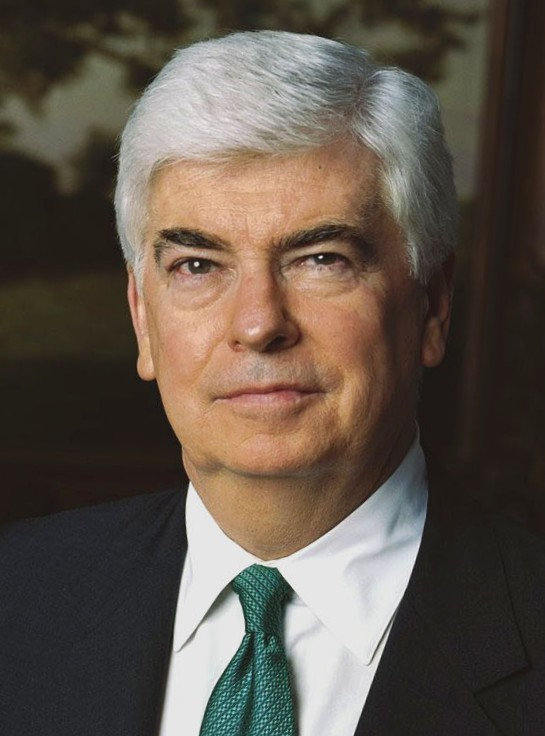

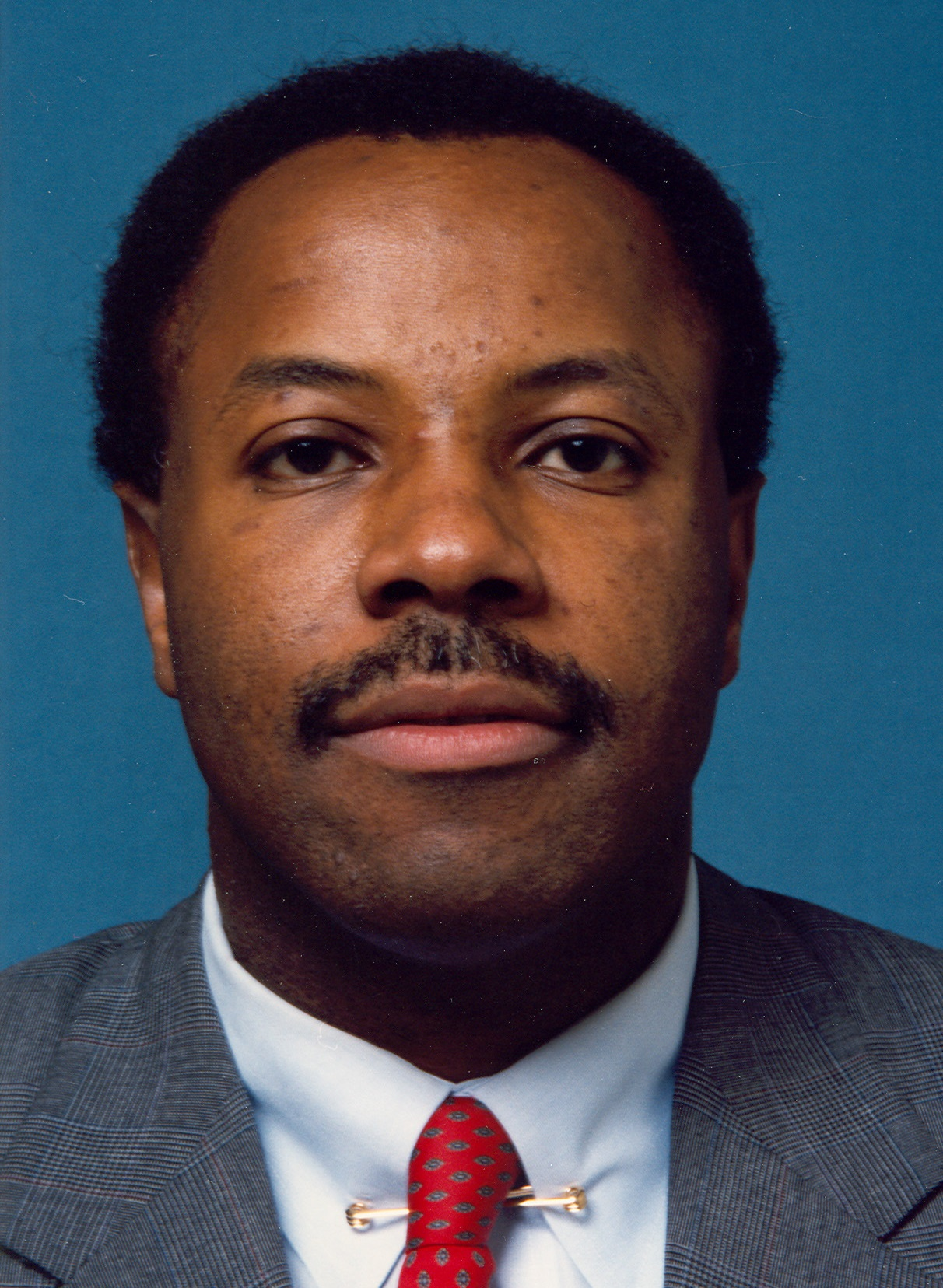
Nominee	Chris Dodd	Gary Franks
Party	Democratic	Republican
Popular vote	628,306	312,177
Percentage	65.15%	32.39%
- Dodd: 50–60% 60–70% 70–80% 80–90% Franks: 40–50% 50–60%
U.S. senator before election
Chris Dodd
Democratic
Elected U.S. Senator
Chris Dodd
Democratic

The 1998 United States Senate election in Connecticut was held November 3, 1998. Democratic incumbent Chris Dodd was re-elected to a fourth term over former Republican congressman Gary Franks.

== General election ==
=== Candidate ===
- Chris Dodd, incumbent U.S. senator since 1981 (Democratic)
- Gary Franks, former U.S. representative from Waterbury (Republican)
- Lois A. Grasso (Independent)
- William Kozak (Concerned Citizens)
- Wildey J. Moore (Libertarian)

=== Polling ===
Poll source	Date(s) administered	Sample size (Note: Key: A – all adults RV – registered voters LV – likely voters V – unclear)	Margin of error	Chris Dodd (D)	Gary Franks (R)	Undecided
Quinnipiac University Polling Institute	October 28 – November 1, 1998	491 (LV)	± 4.0%	64%	27%	9%
Mason-Dixon Polling & Strategy	October 26–27, 1998	633 (LV)	± 4.0%	60%	32%	8%
Quinnipiac University Polling Institute	October 13–19, 1998	683 (LV)	± 3.8%	61%	29%	10%
Mason-Dixon Polling & Strategy	October 9–12, 1998	629 (LV)	± 4.0%	55%	31%	14%
University of Connecticut (Note: Poll sponsored by the Hartford Courant)	October 6–11, 1998	502 (A)	± 4.3%	60%	20%	20%
Quinnipiac University Polling Institute	September 23–28, 1998	526 (LV)	± 4.3%	54%	34%	12%
Quinnipiac University Polling Institute	June 16–22, 1998	1,088 (RV)	± 3.0%	62%	23%	15%
Quinnipiac University Polling Institute	March 24–30, 1998	1,014 (RV)	± 3.0%	60%	24%	16%
Quinnipiac University Polling Institute	February 10–16, 1998	1,303 (RV)	± 2.7%	59%	27%	14%

=== Results ===
Connecticut Senate election 1998
Party	Candidate	Votes	%
Democratic	Chris Dodd (incumbent)	628,306	65.15%
Republican	Gary Franks	312,177	32.39%
Concerned Citizens	William Kozak	12,261	1.27%
Independent	Lois A. Grasso	6,517	0.68%
Libertarian	Wildey J. Moore	5,196	0.54%
Total votes		964,457	100.00%
Democratic hold			

==== By congressional district ====
Dodd won all six congressional districts, including two that elected Republicans.

District	Dodd	Franks	Representative
1st	71%	26%	Barbara Kennelly (105th Congress)
1st	71%	26%	John Larson (106th Congress)
2nd	68%	31%	Sam Gejdenson
3rd	69%	28%	Rosa DeLauro
4th	61%	37%	Chris Shays
5th	59%	38%	James Maloney
6th	62%	35%	Nancy Johnson

== See also ==
- 1998 United States Senate elections

== Notes ==
Partisan clients
