= Paul S. Amenta =

American politician (1922–2014)

Member of the Connecticut Senate from the 6th district
- In office 1975–1977
- Preceded by: John V. Zisk Jr.
- Succeeded by: Nancy Johnson
- In office 1965–1971
- Preceded by: Frank J. DiLoreto
- Succeeded by: Stanley Pac
- In office 1953–1957
- Preceded by: Stanley J. Cichowski
- Succeeded by: John M. Scanlon

Personal details
- Born: September 30, 1922 New Britain, Connecticut, U.S.
- Died: December 8, 2014 (aged 92)
- Party: Democratic
- Spouse: Marion Amenta
- Children: 6
- Education: Central Connecticut State University

Paul S. Amenta (September 30, 1922 – December 8, 2014) was an American politician.

Born in New Britain, Connecticut, Amenta served in the United States Army Air Forces as a pilot during World War II. In 1947, he received his bachelor's degree from New Britain Teachers College (now Central Connecticut State University). He was the legislative director of the American Federation of State, County, and Municipal Workers. Amenta also served on the Connecticut State Board of Education for thirty years. Amenta served in the Connecticut State Senate in 1953, 1955, 1965, 1967, 1969, and 1975, as a Democrat.
