= Julie Kushner =

American politician

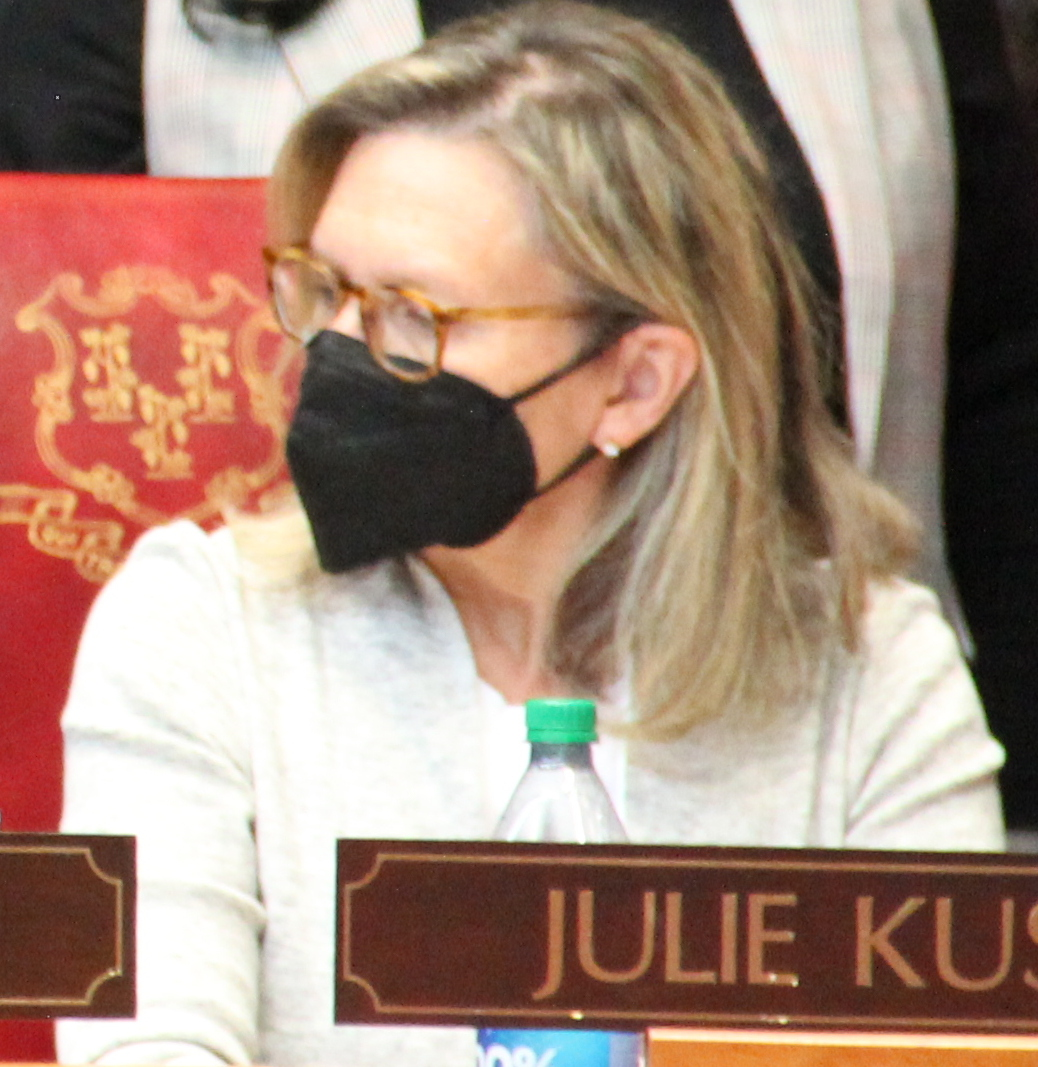
- Kushner in 2023

Member of the Connecticut State Senate from the 24th district
- Incumbent
- Assumed office 9 January 2019
- Preceded by: Michael A. McLachlan

Personal details
- Party: Democratic Party
- Other political affiliations: Working Families Party
- Children: 3
- Education: University of Wisconsin (BA)

Julie Kushner (born c. 1952) is an American politician and retired trade unionist. She worked for United Auto Workers, and was elected to the Connecticut State Senate in 2018.

== Early life and family ==
Julie Kushner's parents were Sheldon and Marcia Kushner. The Kushners lived in Iowa during the 1950s, when Julie Kushner was born. She had a sister, Cathy, and brothers, Michael and Benjamin. Kushner was raised in a Jewish family in Hamburg, Iowa, where her father was a grocer. In the 1960s, her family returned to her father's hometown, Lincoln, Nebraska. Following primary school in the Hamburg Community School District, Kushner attended Lincoln's Irving Junior High School, and graduated from Lincoln Southeast High School. She attended five colleges, graduating from the University of Wisconsin. Kushner moved to New York City with her first husband in 1977. Before the relationship ended, the couple had two children. Kushner later remarried to Larry Morgan, with whom she had another child. Kushner and her family moved to Danbury, Connecticut, in 1993.

== United Auto Workers ==
Kushner was a secretary for three years, after graduating from the University of Wisconsin. She subsequently joined the United Auto Workers (UAW), a labor union. During her tenure as vice president of UAW's district 65, Kushner advocated for clerical and technical workers at Columbia University. The effort for the UAW to represent Columbia's clerical workers took five years, including a contentious representation election held in May 1983. Certification for UAW's district 65 to represent Columbia's clerical and technical employees was granted in February 1985. During a two-day strike in mid-November 1991 organized by Columbia's clerical workers, Kushner stated, "Our people are fed up with the refusal of Columbia to acknowledge that our members are underpaid and unfairly treated. So we're raising the stakes both for Columbia and its allies." In 2000, as a subregional director for UAW, Kushner worked to form a union of postgraduate researchers at New York University. By 2002, efforts to establish a union for adjunct instructors at NYU were underway. The UAW won a representation vote held in July of that year. During Kushner's tenure as a subregional director, the UAW represented adjunct faculty at New School University, as well. Following NYU president John Sexton's 2005 decision to pull recognition of the graduate student union at the school, Kushner participated in an August 2006 protest against the decision, which was reversed in 2013. Prior to her June 2018 retirement from the UAW, Kushner aided the UAW's efforts to organize a graduate student union at Columbia University.

== Political career ==
Prior to campaigning for political office, Kushner was co-chair of the Connecticut Working Families Party for eight years. During her 2018 campaign for the Connecticut State Senate's 24th district seat, Kushner was endorsed by the Connecticut branch of the League of Conservation Voters, labor unions, and The News-Times. Her campaign was backed by the Connecticut Working Families Party and the Democratic Party. Kushner defeated incumbent Michael A. McLachlan in the general election. Following her upset victory, Kushner was sworn in on 9 January 2019. Kushner announced that she would run for reelection in January 2020, and defeated Susan Chapman in the general election.
