= 1980 United States Senate election in Connecticut =

- November 4, 1980
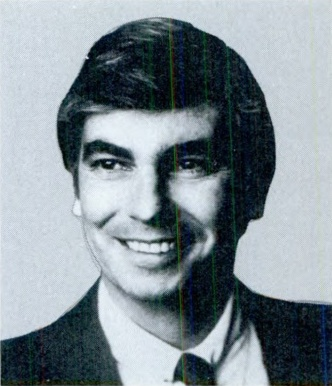

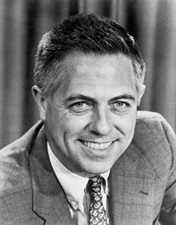
Nominee	Chris Dodd	James Buckley
Party	Democratic	Republican
Popular vote	763,969	581,884
Percentage	56.34%	42.91%
- Dodd: 40–50% 50–60% 60–70% 70–80% 80–90% Buckley: 40–50% 50–60% 60–70% 70–80%
U.S. senator before election
Abraham Ribicoff
Democratic
Elected U.S. Senator
Chris Dodd
Democratic

The 1980 United States Senate election in Connecticut took place on November 4, 1980, alongside other elections to the United States Senate and United States House of Representatives. Incumbent Democratic U.S. Senator Abraham Ribicoff decided to retire. The open seat was won by Democratic Representative Chris Dodd, son of former Senator Thomas J. Dodd. The Republican nominee was James L. Buckley, who served as the United States Senator from neighboring New York from 1971 to 1977.

== Republican primary ==
=== Candidates ===
- Richard Bozzuto, State Senate minority leader and Senator from the 32nd district
- James Buckley, former U.S. Senator from New York

July 26, Republican convention
Party	Candidate	Votes	%
Republican	James L. Buckley	471	50.81%
Republican	Richard C. Bozzuto	456	49.19%
Total votes		927	100.00%

=== Results ===
1980 Republican Senate primary
Party	Candidate	Votes	%
Republican	James L. Buckley	64,962	56.46%
Republican	Richard C. Bozzuto	50,096	43.54%
Total votes		115,058	100.00%

== General election ==
=== Results ===
Connecticut United States Senate election, 1980
Party	Candidate	Votes	%
Democratic	Chris Dodd	763,969	56.34%
Republican	James Buckley	581,884	42.91%
Libertarian	Jerry Brennan	5,336	0.39%
Concerned Citizens	Andrew J. Zemel	4,772	0.35%
Write-in		114	0.01%
Total votes		1,356,075	100.00%
Democratic hold			

== See also ==
- 1980 United States Senate elections
