= Chris Dodd =

American lawyer and politician (born 1944)

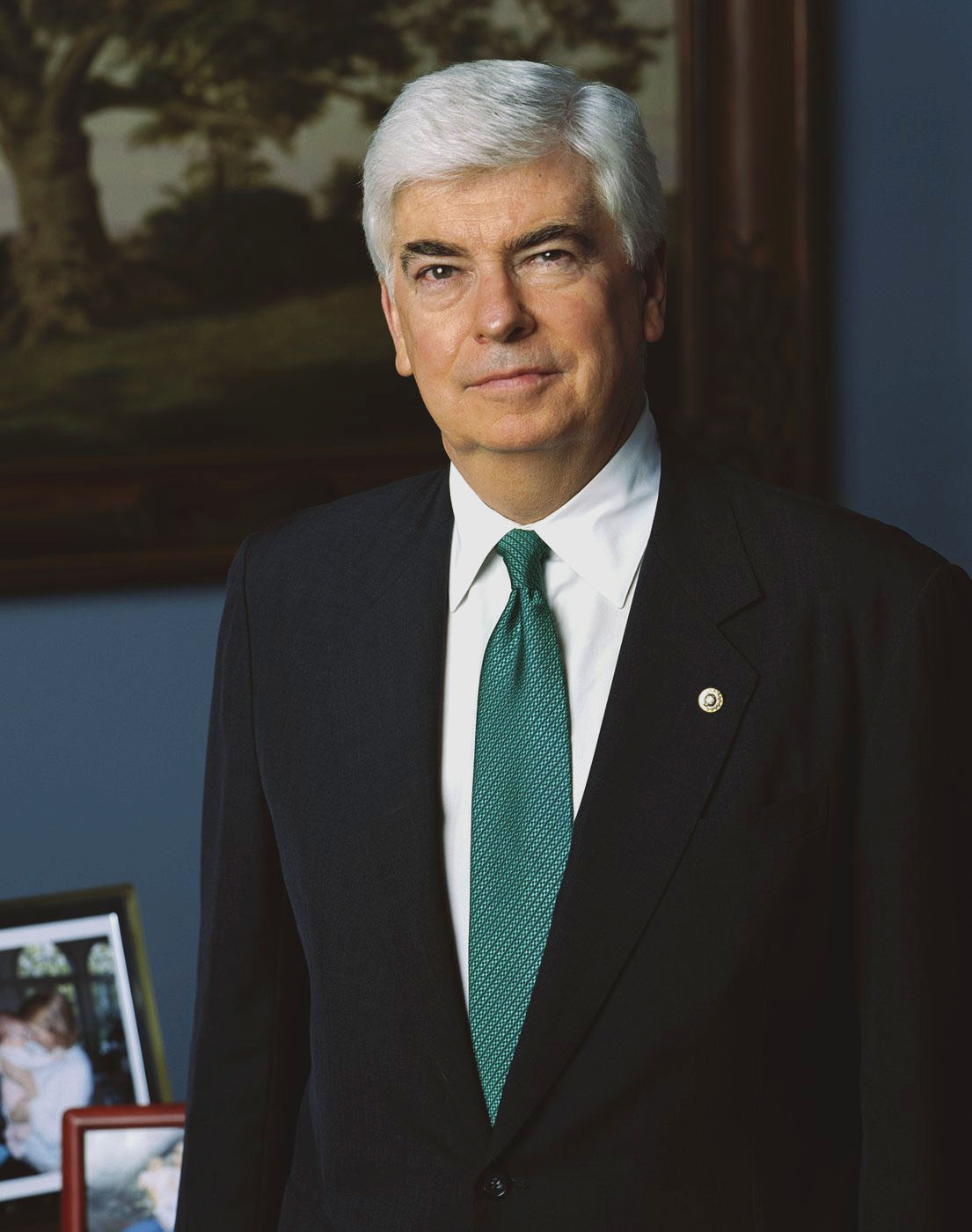
- Official portrait, c. 2006

CEO of the Motion Picture Association
- In office March 17, 2011 – September 5, 2017
- Preceded by: Dan Glickman
- Succeeded by: Charles Rivkin

United States Senator from Connecticut
- In office January 3, 1981 – January 3, 2011
- Preceded by: Abraham Ribicoff
- Succeeded by: Richard Blumenthal
Senate positions
Chair of the Senate Banking Committee
In office January 3, 2007 – January 3, 2011
Preceded by	Richard Shelby
Succeeded by	Tim Johnson
Chair of the Senate Health Committee
Acting
In office June 9, 2009 – September 9, 2009
Preceded by	Ted Kennedy
Succeeded by	Tom Harkin
Chair of the Senate Rules Committee
In office June 6, 2001 – January 3, 2003
Preceded by	Mitch McConnell
Succeeded by	Trent Lott
In office January 3, 2001 – January 20, 2001
Preceded by	Mitch McConnell
Succeeded by	Mitch McConnell

General Chair of the Democratic National Committee
- In office January 21, 1995 – January 21, 1997 Serving with Donald Fowler (National Chair)
- Preceded by: Debra DeLee (Chair)
- Succeeded by: Roy Romer

Member of the U.S. House of Representatives from Connecticut's 2nd district
- In office January 3, 1975 – January 3, 1981
- Preceded by: Robert Steele
- Succeeded by: Sam Gejdenson

Personal details
- Born: Christopher John Dodd; May 27, 1944 (age 82) Willimantic, Connecticut, U.S.
- Party: Democratic
- Spouses: Susan Mooney (m. 1970; div. 1982); Jackie Clegg (m. 1999)
- Children: 2
- Relatives: Thomas J. Dodd (father); Thomas J. Dodd Jr. (brother); Helena Foulkes (niece)
- Education: Providence College (BA); University of Louisville (JD)

Military service
- Branch/service: United States Army
- Years of service: 1969–1975
- Unit: United States Army Reserve
- Dodd's voice Dodd on chairing the Senate Banking Committee and working with Republicans. Recorded April 30, 2010

Christopher John Dodd (born May 27, 1944) is an American lobbyist, lawyer, and Democratic Party politician who served as a United States senator from Connecticut from 1981 to 2011. Dodd is the longest-serving senator in Connecticut's history. He previously served in the United States House of Representatives from 1975 to 1981.

Dodd is a Connecticut native and a graduate of Georgetown Preparatory School in Bethesda, Maryland, and Providence College. His father, Thomas J. Dodd, was also a United States Senator from 1959 to 1971. Chris Dodd served in the Peace Corps for two years prior to entering the University of Louisville School of Law, and during law school concurrently served in the United States Army Reserve.

Dodd returned to Connecticut, winning election in 1974 to the U.S. House of Representatives from Connecticut's 2nd congressional district and was reelected in 1976 and 1978. He was elected to the United States Senate in 1980. Dodd served as general chairman of the Democratic National Committee from 1995 to 1997. He served as Chairman of the Senate Banking Committee from 2007 until his retirement from politics. Notably, he is the partial namesake for the Dodd–Frank Wall Street Reform and Consumer Protection Act.

In 2006, Dodd decided to run for the Democratic nomination for President of the United States, but eventually withdrew after running behind several other competitors.

In January 2010, Dodd announced that he would not run for re-election. Dodd was succeeded by fellow Democrat Richard Blumenthal. Dodd then served as chairman and chief lobbyist for the Motion Picture Association of America (MPAA) from 2011 to 2017. In 2018, Dodd returned to the practice of law, joining the firm Arnold & Porter. In addition to being a member of the ReFormers Caucus of Issue One, Dodd was a close advisor to President Joe Biden and served on his vice presidential selection committee.

== Early life, education, and early political career ==
Dodd was born in Willimantic, Connecticut. His parents were Grace Mary Dodd (née Murphy) and U.S. Senator Thomas Joseph Dodd; all eight of his great-grandparents were born in Ireland. He is the fifth of six children; his eldest brother, Thomas J. Dodd Jr., is a professor emeritus of the School of Foreign Service of Georgetown University, and served as the U.S. ambassador to Uruguay and Costa Rica under President Bill Clinton.

Dodd attended Georgetown Preparatory School, a Jesuit boys' school in Bethesda, Maryland. He graduated with a bachelor's degree in English literature from Providence College in 1966. He served as a Peace Corps volunteer in a small rural town called Moncion, in the Dominican Republic from 1966 to 1968. While there, he became fluent in Spanish. (Later, while in Congress, his support for language study resulted in his being awarded the Northeast Conference on the Teaching of Foreign Languages Advocacy Award in 1986.) Dodd was awarded his Juris Doctor from the University of Louisville in 1972. He also joined the United States Army Reserve, serving until 1975.

== U.S. House of Representatives (1975–1981) ==
Dodd was part of the "Watergate class of '74," which CNN pundit David Gergen credited with bringing "a fresh burst of liberal energy to the Capitol." Elected to the U.S. House of Representatives from Connecticut's 2nd congressional district and reelected twice, he served from January 4, 1975, to January 3, 1981. During his tenure in the House, he served on the United States House Select Committee on Assassinations.

== U.S. Senate (1981–2011) ==
=== Elections ===
Dodd in 1981

Dodd was elected to the U.S. Senate in 1980, and was reelected in 1986, 1992, 1998, and 2004. He is the first senator from Connecticut to serve five consecutive terms.

Facing a competitive reelection bid for his Senate seat in 2010 and trailing against both of his likely Republican challengers in public opinion polling, Dodd announced in January 2010 that he would not seek re-election for a sixth term in the Senate. Polls of Connecticut voters in 2008 and 2009 had consistently suggested Dodd would have difficulty winning re-election, with 46% viewing his job performance as fair or poor and a majority stating they would vote to replace Dodd in the 2010 election.

=== Tenure ===
During the 1994 elections, the Republicans won the majority in both houses of Congress. Dodd therefore entered the minority for the second time in his Senate career. He ran for the now vacant position of Senate Minority Leader, but was defeated by South Dakota Senator Tom Daschle by one vote. The vote was tied 23–23, and it was Colorado Senator Ben Nighthorse Campbell who cast the deciding vote by absentee ballot in favor of Daschle.

From 1995 to 1997, he served as General Chairman of the Democratic National Committee. As General chairman, Dodd was the DNC's spokesman. Donald Fowler served as National chairman, running the party's day-to-day operations. Dodd has also involved himself in children's and family issues, founding the first Senate Children's Caucus and authoring the Family and Medical Leave Act (FMLA), which requires larger employers to provide employees unpaid leave in the event of illness, a sick family member, or the birth or adoption of a child. To date, more than 50 million employees have taken advantage of FMLA mandates. He is working to support a bill that would require employers to provide paid family and medical leave. For his work on behalf of children and families, the National Head Start association named him "Senator of the Decade" in 1990.

Dodd briefly considered running for president in 2004, but ultimately decided against such a campaign and endorsed fellow Connecticut Senator Joe Lieberman. He then was considered as a likely running mate for his friend, eventual Democratic nominee John Kerry. He was also considered a possible candidate for replacing Daschle as Senate Minority Leader in the 109th Congress, but he declined, and that position was instead filled by Harry Reid.

Dodd maintained an office in Hartford, Connecticut, which was burgled in 2007 by a man stealing property for subsequent sale to support his drug habit.

On December 2, 2009, Dodd introduced a revised version of a bill addressing fallout from the Great Recession to the Senate banking committee, which would become known as the Dodd–Frank Wall Street Reform and Consumer Protection Act. The bill contains his name as well as that of House member Barney Frank.

=== Committee assignments ===
- Committee on Foreign Relations
  - Subcommittee on Western Hemisphere, Peace Corps and Narcotics Affairs (chairman)
  - Subcommittee on Near Eastern and South and Central Asian Affairs
  - Subcommittee on East Asian and Pacific Affairs
  - Subcommittee on European Affairs
- Committee on Banking, Housing, and Urban Affairs (chairman)
  - As chairman of the committee, Dodd may serve an ex officio member of all subcommittees of which he is not already a full member.
  - Subcommittee on Economic Policy
  - Subcommittee on Security and International Trade and Finance
  - Subcommittee on Securities, Insurance, and Investment
- Committee on Health, Education, Labor, and Pensions
  - Subcommittee on Children and Families (chairman)
  - Subcommittee on Employment and Workplace Safety
- Committee on Rules and Administration
- Joint Committee on the Library
- Commission on Security and Cooperation in Europe

== 2008 Presidential campaign ==
On January 11, 2007, Dodd announced his candidacy for the office of President of the United States on the Imus in the Morning show. On January 19, 2007, Dodd made a formal announcement with supporters at the Old State House in Hartford.

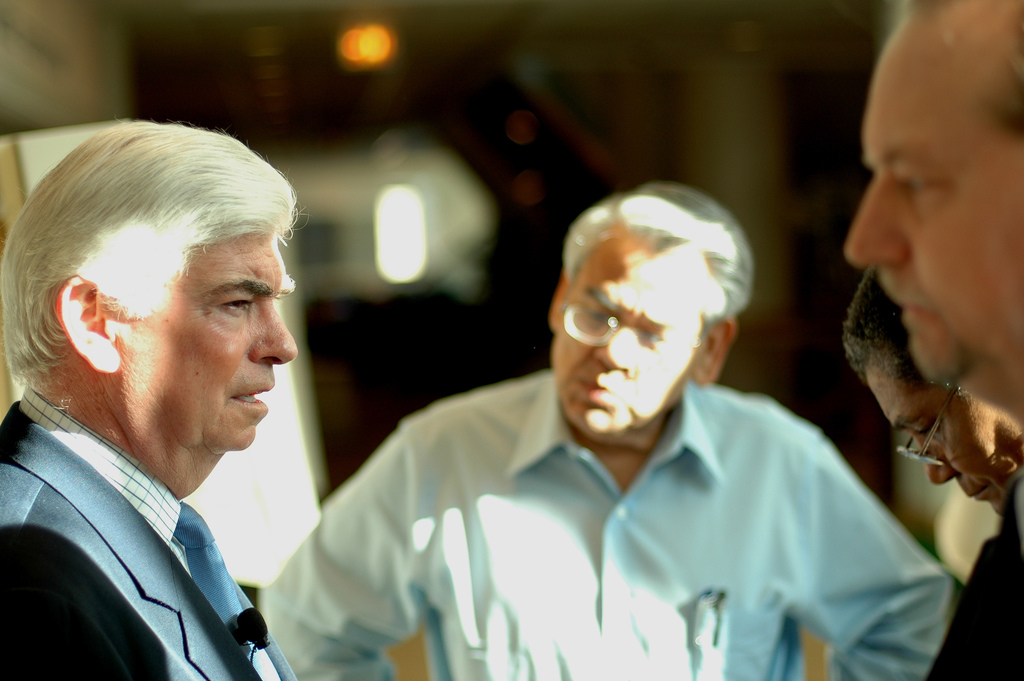
Dodd speaking on the campaign trail, January 2007.

OpenSecrets noted that the Dodd campaign was heavily funded by the financial services industry, which is regulated by committees Dodd chairs in the Senate.

In an unusual move, Dodd shared a plane with one of his rivals for the 2008 nomination. Dodd's friend and fellow US Senator Joe Biden was running his own long-shot campaign, and the two saved money by sharing a campaign plane.

In May, Dodd trailed in state and national polls and acknowledged he was not keeping pace with rival campaigns' fund raising. However, he said that as more voters became aware of his opposition to the Iraq War, they would support his campaign. However, his prospects did not improve; a November 7, 2007 Gallup poll placed him at 1%.

Dodd dropped out of the primary race on the night of the January 3, 2008, Iowa caucuses after placing seventh with almost all precincts reporting, even though he had recently moved from his home state to Iowa for the campaign.

Among eight major candidates for the nomination Dodd, even with later states where he was on the ballot after withdrawal, won last place by popular vote in primary (after Barack Obama, Hillary Clinton, John Edwards, Bill Richardson, Dennis Kucinich, Joe Biden and Mike Gravel, also including uncommitted delegates and scattering votes). He won a total of 25,252 votes in delegates primaries and 9,940 in penalized contests.

Dodd later said he was not interested in running for Vice President or Senate Majority Leader, and endorsed former rival Barack Obama on February 26, 2008.

== Post-Senate career ==
=== Motion Picture Association of America ===
In February 2011, despite "repeatedly and categorically insisting that he would not work as a lobbyist," Dodd replaced Dan Glickman as chairman of and chief lobbyist for the MPAA.

On January 17, 2012, Dodd released a statement criticizing "the so-called 'Blackout Day' protesting anti-piracy legislation." Referring to the websites participating in the blackout, Dodd said, "It is an irresponsible response and a disservice to people who rely on them for information and use their services. It is also an abuse of power... when the platforms that serve as gateways to information intentionally skew the facts to incite their users in order to further their corporate interests." In further comments, Dodd threatened to cut off campaign contributions to politicians who did not support the Preventing Real Online Threats to Economic Creativity and Theft of Intellectual Property Act and the Stop Online Piracy Act, legislation supported by the MPAA.

On September 4, 2017, Dodd stepped down as MPAA CEO, and was replaced by former U.S. Ambassador to France and Assistant Secretary of State for Economic and Business Affairs Charles Rivkin.

=== Law practice ===
Following his tenure at MPAA, Dodd joined law firm Arnold & Porter in Washington, D.C.

=== 2020 U.S. presidential election and Biden administration ===
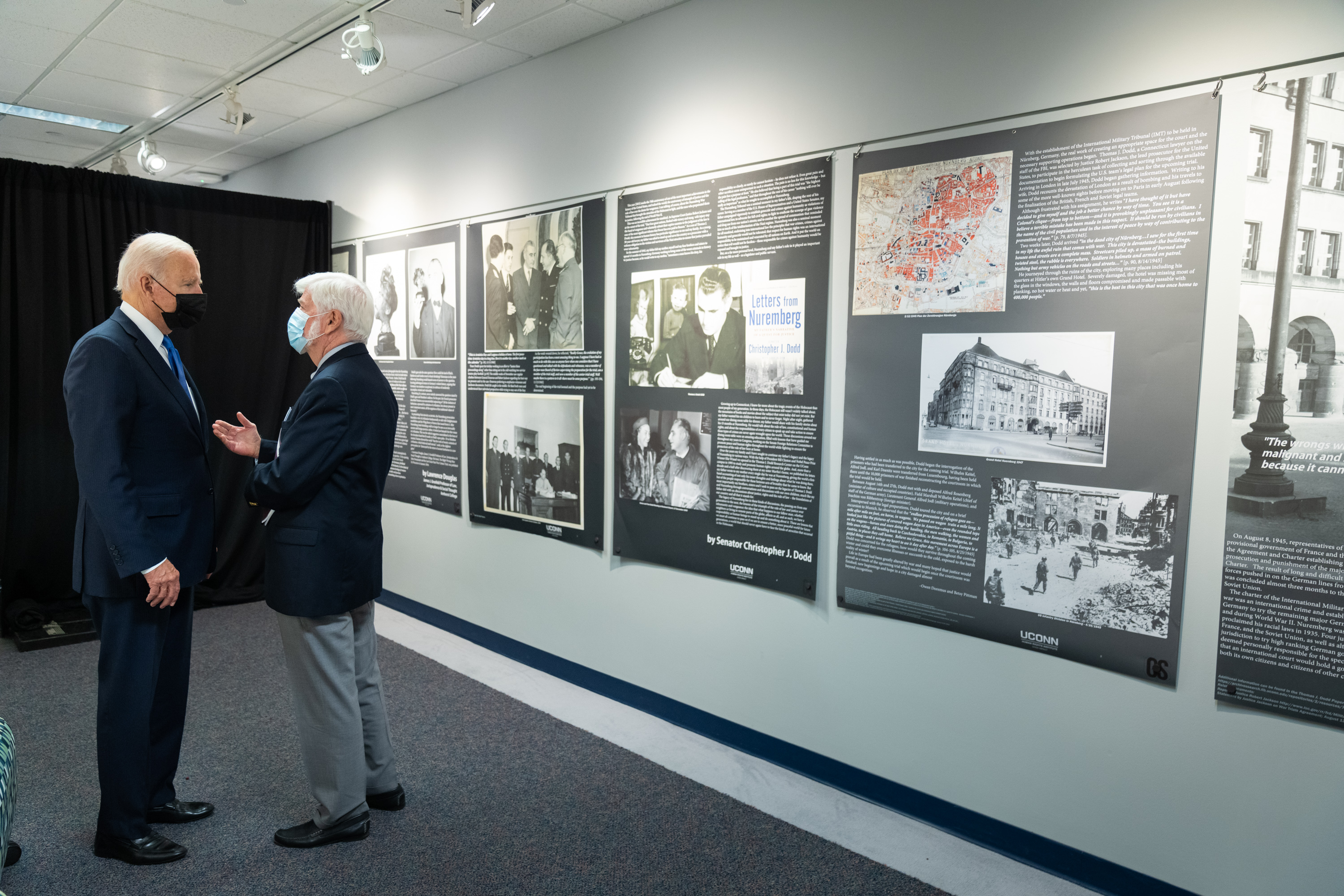
Dodd with President Joe Biden in 2021

During the 2020 Democratic primary, Dodd was an advisor and surrogate for the campaign of his friend and colleague Joe Biden. Dodd was a member of Biden's vice presidential search committee. He was reported to have spoken against picking California Senator Kamala Harris—saying that "she had no remorse" for "her ambush on Biden in the first Democratic [primary] debate"—and to have advocated for California Congresswoman Karen Bass to be selected instead because "she's a loyal No. 2."

On March 1, 2021, the public relations and advisory company Teneo announced that it was hiring Dodd, while he was a top advisor to President Biden, as a senior advisor at the company, and that Teneo had acquired a significant minority stake in the consulting firm WestExec Advisors, which had very close ties to the new Biden administration.

== Controversies ==
=== Countrywide Financial loan controversy ===
In his role as chairman of the Senate Banking Committee Dodd proposed a program in June 2008 that would assist troubled sub-prime mortgage lenders such as Countrywide Financial in the wake of the United States housing bubble's collapse. Condé Nast Portfolio reported allegations that in 2003 Dodd had refinanced the mortgages on his homes in Washington, D.C., and Connecticut through Countrywide Financial and had received favorable terms due to being placed in the "Friends of Angelo" VIP program, so named for Countrywide CEO Angelo Mozilo. Dodd received mortgages from Countrywide at allegedly below-market rates on his Washington, D.C., and Connecticut homes. Dodd had not disclosed the below-market mortgages in any of six financial disclosure statements he filed with the Senate or Office of Government Ethics since obtaining the mortgages in 2003.

Dodd's press secretary said "The Dodds received a competitive rate on their loans," and that they "did not seek or anticipate any special treatment, and they were not aware of any," then declined further comment. The Hartford Courant reported Dodd had taken "a major credibility hit" from the scandal. At the same time, the Chairman of the Senate Budget Committee Kent Conrad and the head of Fannie Mae Jim Johnson received mortgages on favorable terms due to their association with Countrywide CEO Angelo Mozilo. The Wall Street Journal, The Washington Post, and two Connecticut papers have demanded further disclosure from Dodd regarding the Mozilo loans.

On June 17, 2008, Dodd met twice with reporters and gave accounts of his mortgages with Countrywide. He admitted to reporters in Washington, D.C., that he knew as of 2003 that he was in a VIP program, but claimed it was due to being a longtime Countrywide customer, not due to his political position. He omitted this detail in a press availability to Connecticut media.

On July 30, 2009, Dodd responded to news reports about his mortgages by releasing information from The Wall Street Journal showing that both mortgages he received were in line with those being offered to general public in fall 2003 in terms of points and interest rate.

On August 7, 2009, a Senate ethics panel issued its decision on the controversy. The Select Committee on Ethics said it found "no credible evidence" that Dodd knowingly sought out a special loan or treatment because of his position, but the panel also said in an open letter to Dodd that the lawmaker should have questioned why he was being put in the "Friends of Angelo" VIP program at Countrywide: "Once you became aware that your loans were in fact being handled through a program with the name 'V.I.P.,' that should have raised red flags for you."

=== Fannie Mae/Freddie Mac controversies ===
Dodd was involved in issues related to the federal takeover of Fannie Mae and Freddie Mac during the 2008 subprime mortgage crisis. As part of Dodd's overall mortgage bill the Housing and Economic Recovery Act of 2008 before Congress in the summer of 2008, Treasury Secretary Hank Paulson sought provisions enabling the Treasury to add additional capital and regulatory oversight over these government-sponsored enterprises. At the time, it was estimated that the federal government would need to spend $25 billion (~$36.7 billion in 2025) on a bailout of the firms.

During this period, Dodd denied reports claiming that these firms were in financial crisis. He called the firms "fundamentally strong," said they were in "sound situation" and "in good shape" and to "suggest they are in major trouble is not accurate." In early September, after the firms continued to report huge losses, Secretary Paulson announced a federal takeover of both Fannie Mae and Freddie Mac. Dodd expressed skepticism of the action, which the Treasury estimated could cost as much as $200 billion.

Dodd was the top recipient in Congress, followed by John Kerry, Barack Obama, then Hillary Clinton, of campaign funds from Fannie Mae and Freddie Mac during 1989–2008.

=== Irish cottage controversy ===
In February 2009, Kevin Rennie, a columnist at the Hartford Courant, ran an op-ed concerning Dodd's acquisition of his vacation home in Roundstone, Ireland. The article alleged that Dodd's former partner in buying the home had ties to disgraced Bear Stearns principal Edward Downe, Jr. who had since been convicted of insider trading by the Securities and Exchange Commission. After paying an $11 million fine for his role in the scam, Downe later obtained a pardon in the waning days of the Bill Clinton administration. The controversial pardon was granted after Dodd lobbied Clinton on Downe's behalf. Dodd's letter to the President said, "Mr. President, Ed Downe is a good person, who is truly sorry for the hurt he caused others." After Downe's pardon, Dodd bought out the interests of his partner for a price allegedly based on a 2002 bank appraisal of the Roundstone home, which yielded little profit for Dodd's partner. Rennie criticized Dodd for claiming the Roundstone home was worth less than $250,000 in Senate ethics filings; some observers estimated the likely value in excess of US$1 million.

In June 2009, Dodd provided a new statement to the Senate reporting the actual value of his Irish property at $658,000 (~$958,320 in 2025). The Wall Street Journal later compared this issue to the ethical charges which led to the political demise of Alaska Senator Ted Stevens.

=== AIG federal assistance and bonuses controversy ===
From the fall of 2008 through early 2009, the United States government spent nearly $170 billion to assist failing insurance giant American International Group. AIG then spent $165 million of this money to hand out executive "retention" bonuses to its top executives. Public outrage ensued over this perceived misuse of taxpayer dollars.

The Fox Business Network's Rich Edson broke the story claiming Dodd was responsible for the inclusion of a clause limiting excessive executive pay in the American Recovery and Reinvestment Act. On February 14, 2009, The Wall Street Journal published an article, Bankers Face Strict New Pay Cap, discussing a retroactive limit to bonus compensation inserted by Dodd into the stimulus bill that passed in the Senate.

The same article went on to mention that Treasury Secretary Timothy Geithner and Lawrence Summers "had called Sen. Dodd and asked him to reconsider."

When the bill left conference, Dodd's provision had been amended to include a provision preventing limits on bonuses previously negotiated and under contract. This provision was lobbied for by Geithner and Summers.

As Dodd explained in a March 18, 2009, interview on CNN, at Geithner and the Obama Administration's insistence he allowed his provision's original language to include Geithner and Summers' request, which in turn allowed AIG to give out bonuses under previously negotiated contracts. However, Dodd's provision also included language allowing the Treasury Secretary to examine bonuses doled out and, if they were found to be in violation of the public interest, recoup those funds.

Dodd retreated from his original statement that he did not know how the amendment was changed. Dodd was criticized by many in the Connecticut media for the flip-flop. In a March 20, 2009, editorial the New Haven Register called Dodd "a lying weasel" The same day, Hartford Courant columnist Rick Green called on Dodd not to seek re-election in 2010.

The Hill described Dodd as "reeling" from the controversy and having "stepped in it" after changing his story about the bonus amendment.

At a press conference in Enfield, Connecticut, on March 20, 2017, Dodd responded to critics and explained that his original answer to CNN was based on a misunderstanding of the question. He also said he was disappointed that the Treasury officials who asked him to make the legislative changes had not identified themselves, refusing to confirm the identity of the individuals responsible for changing the amendment.

The Manchester Journal Inquirer suggested that "Chris Dodd's explaining may have only begun."

Opensecrets.org reported that Dodd received over $223,000 from AIG employees, many of whom were Connecticut residents, for his campaigns. Additionally, realclearpolitics.com reported that Dodd's wife was a former director for Bermuda-based IPC Holdings, a company controlled by AIG. She held this position before she married him. On May 3, 2009, the Courant reported Dodd's wife served on a number of corporate boards, including the CME Group and could be earning as much as $500,000 annually for those services. On March 30, 2009, The Courant reported that former AIG Financial Products head Joseph Cassano personally solicited contributions from his employees in Connecticut via an e-mail in fall 2006, suggesting that the contributions were related to Dodd's ascension to the chairmanship of the Senate Banking Committee.

=== Sexual assault allegation ===
In 1985, Dodd and fellow Senator Ted Kennedy, were involved in an incident at a Washington restaurant, which a waitress reported allegations that the pair sexually assaulted her. According to an account in GQ magazine, Kennedy grabbed waitress Carla Gaviglio, and rubbed his genital area against hers, while pressing her against Dodd's lap. The incident was corroborated to the magazine by another waitress, as well as the restaurant's owner.

In late-April 2020, it was announced that Dodd was a member of the vetting committee for the selection of presumptive Democratic Party presidential nominee Joe Biden's running mate. The appointment caused Gaviglio's allegation to re-appear in the news, in the context of the MeToo movement, and Biden's own sexual assault allegation.

During this time, Gaviglio spoke again of the incident, acknowledging that Kennedy was the instigator, but also laying blame on Dodd. When asked about the vice presidential search, she stated she would still vote for Biden, but disapproved of Dodd being part of the selection process.

== Political positions ==
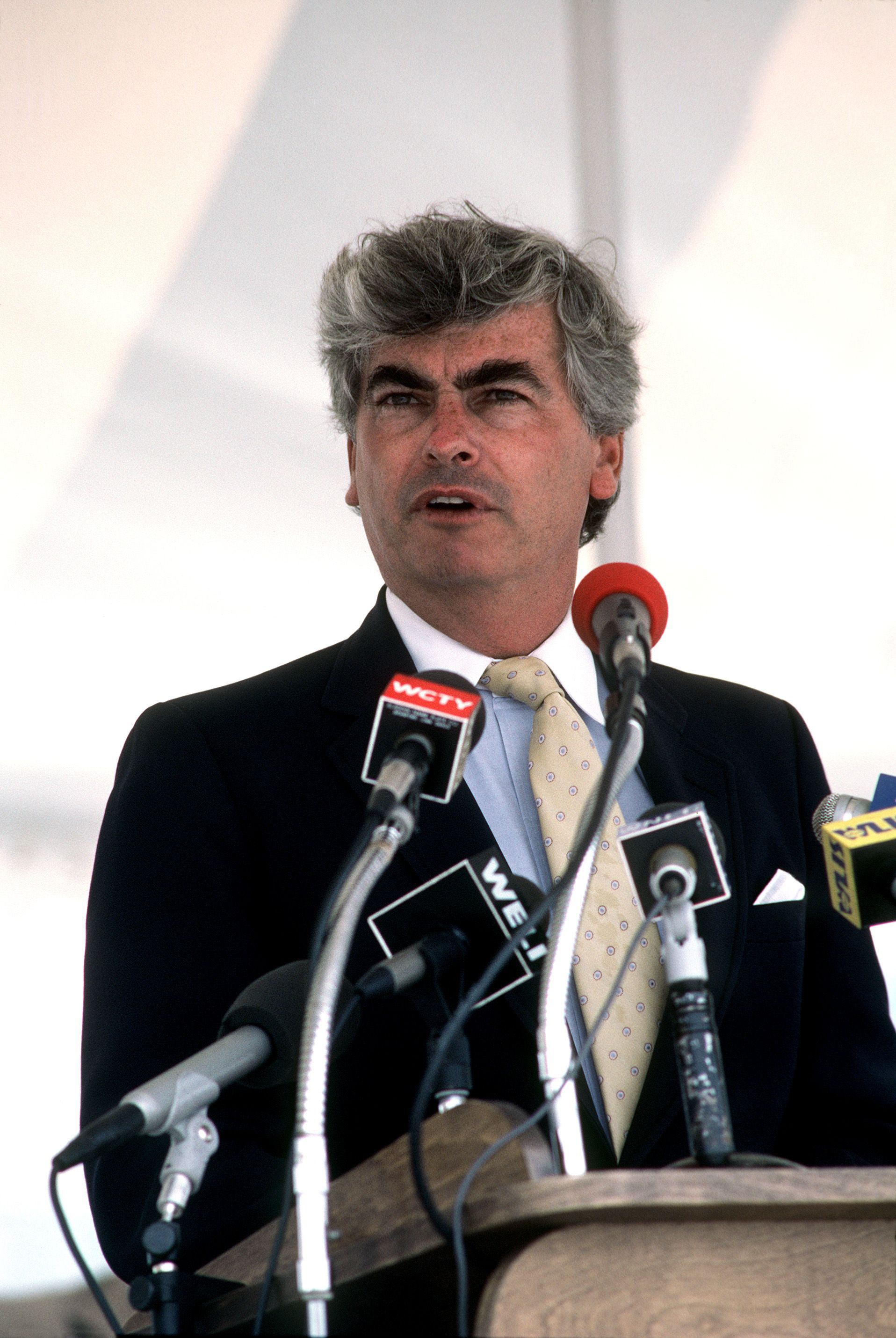
Dodd giving a speech at Naval Submarine Base New London, July 1985.

Dodd supported amending the Family and Medical Leave Act, which he authored in 1993, to include paid leave, and a corporate carbon tax to combat global warming.

Dodd is credited with inserting the last-minute pay limit into American Recovery and Reinvestment Act of 2009. The pay restrictions included prohibition of bonuses in excess of one-third of total salary for any company receiving any money from the plan and was retroactive to companies that received funds under Troubled Assets Relief Program. Fortune magazine however, panned this provision as likely to "drive the craftiest financial minds away from the most troubled institutions." This article also pointed out the Dodd bill delegated to the Treasury Secretary the right to approve appropriate restaurants for client entertainment.

In May 2009, Dodd was the author and lead sponsor of the Credit Card Accountability, Responsibility, and Disclosure Act of 2009, which was signed into law by President Barack Obama on May 22, 2009. The law requires card companies give cardholders 45 days notice of any interest rate increases, prevents card companies from retroactively increasing interest rates on the existing balance of a cardholder in good standing for reasons unrelated to the cardholder's behavior with that card, and prohibits card companies from arbitrarily changing the terms of their contract with a cardholder, banning the so-called practice of "any-time, any-reason repricing." Also included in the bill were provisions requiring companies to give cardholders time to pay their bills by requiring card companies to mail billing statements 25 calendar days before the due date and individuals under the age of 21 to either show income or have a co-signer to obtain a credit card. In a conference call with reporters after the bill was signed, Dodd stated his intention to continue work on capping credit card interest rates at thirty percent and to establish limits on fees that merchants pay when a customer uses a credit card for a purchase.

Dodd announced on June 22, 2009, that he supports same-sex marriage. He had opposed gay marriage in the 2008 election, but stated that his daughters are growing up in a different generation than his and that his views have evolved over time. Same-sex couples have been able to marry in Connecticut since November 12, 2008, following the Connecticut Supreme Court's ruling. In April 2009, the legislature overwhelmingly passed and Governor Jodi Rell signed a bill making all references to marriage in law gender neutral.

== Personal life ==
In 1970, Dodd married Susan Mooney; they divorced in 1982. Afterwards, he dated at different times Bianca Jagger and Carrie Fisher, among others.

In 1999, Dodd married Jackie Marie Clegg, a native of Orem, Utah, former longtime aide to Senator Jake Garn, Republican of Utah, and former official at the Export-Import Bank of the United States. The marriage joined Dodd's family of New England Catholic Democrats with Clegg's family of LDS (Mormon) Republicans from the Utah Valley. The couple has two daughters, Grace (born September 2001) and Christina Dodd (born May 2005).

Dodd was raised as a Catholic and attends Mass. In 2007, Dodd stated that his Catholic faith taught him "to promote the common good" and "do everything possible to provide a safety net for the most vulnerable." Dodd also credited his Catholic background with his decision to join the Peace Corps. Dodd's two children were baptized in the Catholic tradition and blessed in the Mormon tradition.

He made a brief cameo appearance as himself in the political satire film Dave (1993).

On July 31, 2009, Dodd announced he had been diagnosed with prostate cancer; his aides said that it was at an early, treatable stage and Dodd would undergo surgery during the Senate August recess. The surgery, held at the Memorial Sloan-Kettering Cancer Center in New York, was successful.

== Awards and honors ==
In 2008, Dodd received the Washington Office on Latin America's Human Rights Award.

In 2014, Dodd received The Media Institute's Freedom of Speech Award.

In 2016, Dodd received the Brass Ring Award from the United Friends of the Children, a Los Angeles charitable organization, in recognition of his work on behalf of children while in the Senate.

In 2025, Dodd received the Presidential Citizens Medal, the second highest civilian award, from President Joe Biden.

== See also ==
- Dodd–Frank Wall Street Reform and Consumer Protection Act

U.S. House of Representatives
Preceded by Robert Steele	Member of the U.S. House of Representatives from Connecticut's 2nd congressional district 1975–1981	Succeeded by Sam Gejdenson
Party political offices
Preceded by Abraham Ribicoff	Democratic nominee for U.S. Senator from Connecticut (Class 3); 1980, 1986, 1992, 1998, 2004	Succeeded by Dick Blumenthal
Preceded by Debra DeLee as Chair of the Democratic National Committee	General Chair of the Democratic National Committee; 1995–1997; Served alongside: Don Fowler (National Chair)	Succeeded by Roy Romer
U.S. Senate
Preceded by Abraham Ribicoff	U.S. Senator (Class 3) from Connecticut; 1981–2011; Served alongside: Lowell Weicker, Joe Lieberman	Succeeded by Dick Blumenthal
Preceded by Wendell Ford	Ranking Member of the Senate Rules Committee; 1999–2001	Succeeded by Mitch McConnell
Preceded by Mitch McConnell	Chair of the Senate Rules Committee; 2001	Succeeded by Mitch McConnell
Preceded by Mitch McConnell	Ranking Member of the Senate Rules Committee; 2001	Succeeded by Mitch McConnell
Preceded by Mitch McConnell	Chair of the Senate Rules Committee; 2001–2003	Succeeded by Trent Lott
Preceded by Mitch McConnell	Ranking Member of the Senate Rules Committee; 2003–2007	Succeeded by Bob Bennett
Preceded by Richard Shelby	Chair of the Senate Banking Committee; 2007–2011	Succeeded by Tim Johnson
Preceded by Ted Kennedy	Chair of the Senate Health Committee; Acting; 2009	Succeeded by Tom Harkin
Non-profit organization positions
Preceded by Dan Glickman	Chair and CEO of the Motion Picture Association of America; 2011–2017	Succeeded by Charles Rivkin
U.S. order of precedence (ceremonial)
Preceded by Max Baucus as Former U.S. Senator	Order of precedence of the United States as Former U.S. Senator	Succeeded by Barbara Mikulski as Former U.S. Senator
