= Michael A. McLachlan =

American politician (born 1958)

Michael A. McLachlan (born May 18, 1958) is an American politician from Danbury, Connecticut. He was Deputy Minority Leader of the Connecticut State Senate for the Republican Party. First elected in 2008, he represented the 24th District which includes Bethel, Danbury, New Fairfield and Sherman. In the 2018 Midterm Elections, he lost re-election to Democrat Julie Kushner.

Connecticut State Senate
Preceded by David Cappiello	Member of the Connecticut State Senate from the 24th district 2009–2019	Succeeded by Julie Kushner
