= 1986 United States Senate election in Connecticut =

- November 4, 1986
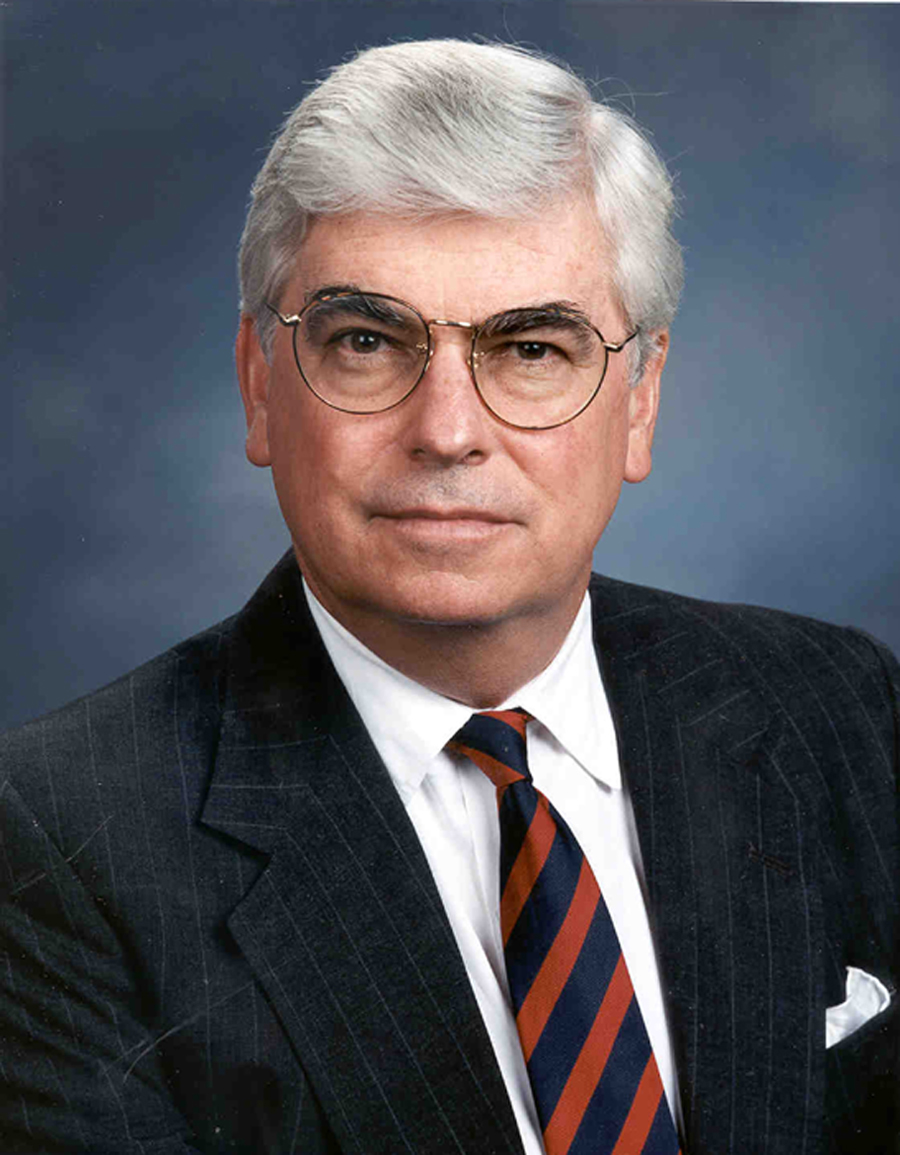

Nominee	Chris Dodd	Roger Eddy
Party	Democratic	Republican
Popular vote	632,695	340,438
Percentage	64.76%	34.85%
- Dodd: 50–60% 60–70% 70–80% 80–90% Eddy: 50–60% 60–70%
U.S. senator before election
Chris Dodd
Democratic
Elected U.S. Senator
Chris Dodd
Democratic

The 1986 United States Senate election in Connecticut took place on November 4, 1986, alongside other elections to the United States Senate and United States House of Representatives. Incumbent Democratic U.S. Senator Chris Dodd won re-election to a second term.

== Major candidates ==
=== Democratic ===
- Chris Dodd, incumbent U.S. Senator

=== Republican ===
- Roger Eddy, Republican National Committeeman

== Results ==
Connecticut United States Senate election, 1986
Party	Candidate	Votes	%
Democratic	Chris Dodd (incumbent)	632,695	64.76%
Republican	Roger Eddy	340,438	34.85%
Independent	Edward J. McCallum Jr.	3,800	0.39%
Democratic hold			

== See also ==
- 1986 United States Senate elections
