= Mark Nielsen (attorney) =

American politician

Chief of Staff to the Governor of Massachusetts
- In office 2006–2007
- Governor: Mitt Romney
- Preceded by: Beth Myers
- Succeeded by: Joan Wallace-Benjamin

Chief Legal Counsel to the Governor of Massachusetts
- In office 2004–2006
- Governor: Mitt Romney
- Preceded by: Daniel Winslow
- Succeeded by: Brian Leske

Member of the Connecticut Senate from the 24th district
- In office 1995–1999
- Preceded by: James H. Maloney
- Succeeded by: David Cappiello

Member of the Connecticut House of Representatives from the 138th district
- In office 1993–1995
- Preceded by: Lawrence Anastasia
- Succeeded by: David Cappiello

Personal details
- Born: Hartford, Connecticut, U.S.
- Party: Republican
- Education: Harvard College (AB); Harvard Law School (JD)

Mark D. Nielsen is an American business executive, former elected official, and attorney.

Nielsen's current position is chief legal and regulatory officer of Frontier Communications Parent, Inc. (NASDAQ: FYBR), at the company's offices in Norwalk, Connecticut. Frontier is America's fourth largest landline telecom company providing data and voice services in 25 states.

Nielsen started his legal career in 1990 as an associate lawyer at the Hartford law firm of Murtha, Cullina, Richter & Pinney, concentrating on federal and state litigation.

Nielsen's public roles have included state representative in Connecticut (1992-1994), state senator in Connecticut (1994-1998), and staff member to Mitt Romney when Romney was Governor of Massachusetts. Nielsen served as Romney's chief legal counsel from 2004 to 2006, and his chief of staff from 2006 to 2007, succeeding Beth Myers in that position.

In his memoir, In My Time, Vice President Dick Cheney acknowledges that he was initially angered by Nielsen’s favorable comments about Cheney's opponent in the 2000 election, Senator Joe Lieberman, but that, upon reflection, he couldn’t disagree with what Nielsen had said about Lieberman.

Nielsen is an honors graduate of Harvard College and Harvard Law School, and currently serves as a member of the Adjunct Faculty at Columbia Law School.

Connecticut House of Representatives
| Preceded by Lawrence Anastasia | Member of the Connecticut House of Representatives from the 138th district 1993–1995 | Succeeded by David Cappiello |
Connecticut State Senate
| Preceded by James H. Maloney | Member of the Connecticut Senate from the 24th district 1995–1999 | Succeeded by David Cappiello |
Party political offices
| Preceded by Gary A. Franks | Republican Party Nominee for the 5th Congressional District of Connecticut; 1998 (lost), 2000 (lost) | Succeeded by Nancy L. Johnson |
