= James H. Maloney =

American politician (born 1948)

Jim Maloney
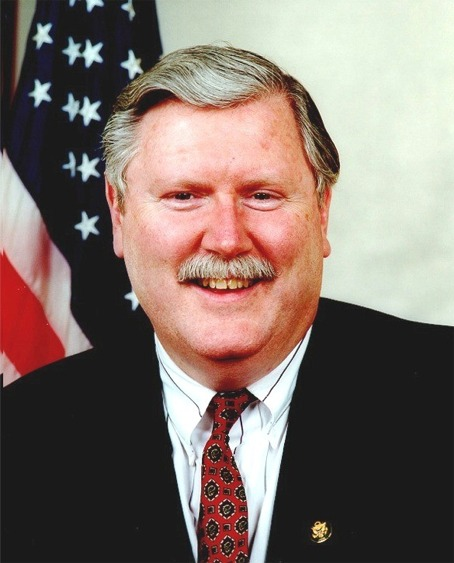

Member of the U.S. House of Representatives from Connecticut's 5th district
- In office January 3, 1997 – January 3, 2003
- Preceded by: Gary Franks
- Succeeded by: Nancy Johnson

Member of the Connecticut Senate from the 24th district
- In office January 1987 – January 1995
- Preceded by: Robert T. Miller
- Succeeded by: Mark Nielsen

Personal details
- Born: September 17, 1948 (age 77) Quincy, Massachusetts, U.S.
- Party: Democratic
- Education: Harvard University (BA); Boston University (JD)

James Henry "Jim" Maloney III (born September 17, 1948) is an American politician and lawyer from Connecticut. He is a former Democratic member of the U.S. House of Representatives.

Maloney was born in Quincy, Massachusetts. He served as a Volunteers in Service to America (VISTA) volunteer from 1969 until 1970. He graduated from Harvard University in 1972 and received a J.D. degree from Boston University School of Law in 1980. Prior to his entry into politics he practiced law in Danbury. He was a member of the Connecticut State Senate from 1987 until 1995.

Maloney was elected to Congress in 1996 and represented Connecticut's 5th district from January 3, 1997 until January 3, 2003. In that election, Maloney defeated the incumbent Republican, Gary Franks. Maloney held the seat despite two strong challenges from Mark Nielsen in 1998 and 2000. In 2002, the reapportionment process merged Maloney's Waterbury-based district with the New Britain-based 6th District of Republican incumbent Nancy Johnson. While the new district was numerically Maloney's district (the 5th), its demographics slightly favored Johnson, who won by over 20,000 votes.

== Electoral history ==
Connecticut's 5th congressional district: Results 1994–2000
Year	Democratic	Votes	Pct	Republican	Votes	Pct	3rd Party	Party	Votes	Pct		3rd Party	Party	Votes	Pct
1994	James H. Maloney (on ACP line)** (Total)	57,579; 23,944; 81,523	32% 13% 46%	Gary A. Franks	93,471	52%	Rosita Rodriguez	Concerned Citizens	4,059	2%					
1996	James H. Maloney (on ACP line)** (Total)	105,359; 6,615; 111,974	49% 3% 52%	Gary A. Franks	98,782	46%	Rosita Rodriguez	Concerned Citizens	2,983	1%		Walter F. Thiessen, Jr.	Libertarian	1,391	1%
1998	James H. Maloney	78,394	50%	Mark Nielsen	76,051	48%	Robert V. Strasdauskas	Concerned Citizens	2,712	2%					
2000	James H. Maloney	118,932	54%	Mark Nielsen	98,229	44%	Joseph A. Zdonczyk	Concerned Citizens	4,653	2%	*				
2002	James H. Maloney	90,616	43%	Nancy Johnson	113,626	54%	Joseph A. Zdonczyk	Concerned Citizens	3,709	2%		Walter J. Gengarelly	Libertarian	1,503	1%

Write-in and minor candidate notes: In 2000, write-ins received 7 votes.

**Maloney ran as the candidate of both the Democratic party and A Connecticut Party in 1994 and 1996.

U.S. House of Representatives
Preceded by Gary Franks	Member of the U.S. House of Representatives from Connecticut's 5th congressional district 1997–2003	Succeeded by Nancy Johnson
U.S. order of precedence (ceremonial)
Preceded by Gary Franks as Former U.S. Representative	Order of precedence of the United States as Former U.S. Representative	Succeeded by Rob Simmons as Former U.S. Representative
