= Nancy Johnson =

American politician (born 1935)

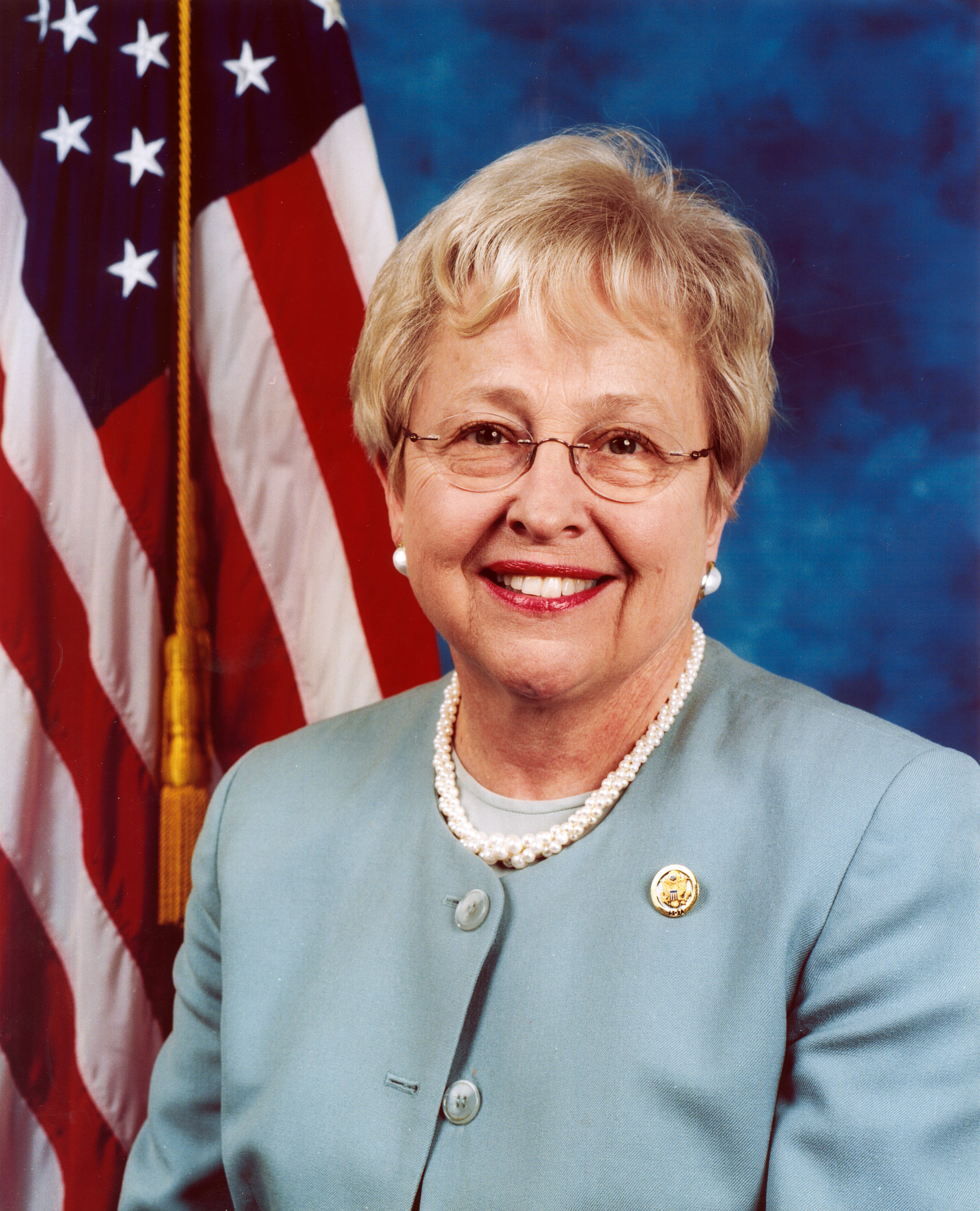

Chair of the House Ethics Committee
- In office January 3, 1995 – January 3, 1997
- Preceded by: Jim McDermott
- Succeeded by: James V. Hansen

Member of the U.S. House of Representatives from Connecticut
- In office January 3, 1983 – January 3, 2007
- Preceded by: Toby Moffett
- Succeeded by: Chris Murphy
- Constituency: 6th district (1983–2003); 5th district (2003–2007)

Member of the Connecticut State Senate from the 6th district
- In office January 5, 1977 – January 3, 1983
- Preceded by: Paul S. Amenta
- Succeeded by: Joe Harper

Personal details
- Born: Nancy Elizabeth Lee; January 5, 1935 (age 91) Chicago, Illinois, U.S.
- Party: Republican
- Spouse: Ted Johnson (m. 1958, died 2025)
- Children: 3
- Education: Harvard University (BA); University of London (attended)

Nancy Elizabeth Johnson (née Lee; born January 5, 1935) is an American lobbyist and politician from the state of Connecticut. Johnson was a Republican member of the United States House of Representatives from 1983 to 2007, representing the 6th district and later the 5th District after reapportionment.

In September 2007, Johnson began lobbying for Baker, Donelson, Bearman, Caldwell & Berkowitz, PC in Washington, D.C.

== Early life, education, and early career ==
Nancy Johnson was born in Chicago. She graduated from the University of Chicago Laboratory School (high school) in 1953, and from Radcliffe College of Harvard University in 1957. She attended the University of London's Courtauld Institute of Art in 1957 and 1958. She later moved to New Britain, Connecticut, where she lives today.

She was an active volunteer in the schools and social service agencies of her community, before serving in the Connecticut Senate from 1977 to 1983.

== House of Representatives ==
=== Elections ===
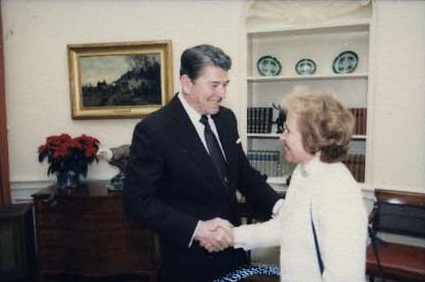
Johnson and President Ronald Reagan in 1985

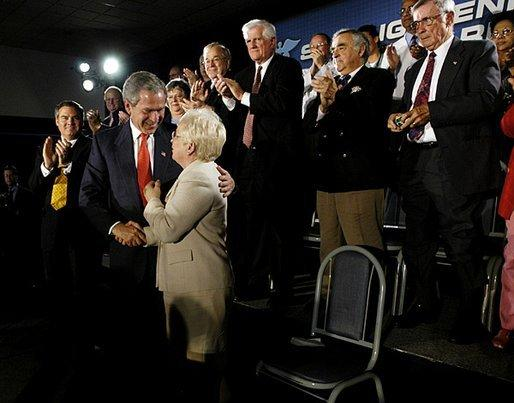
Johnson greeting President George W. Bush in 2003

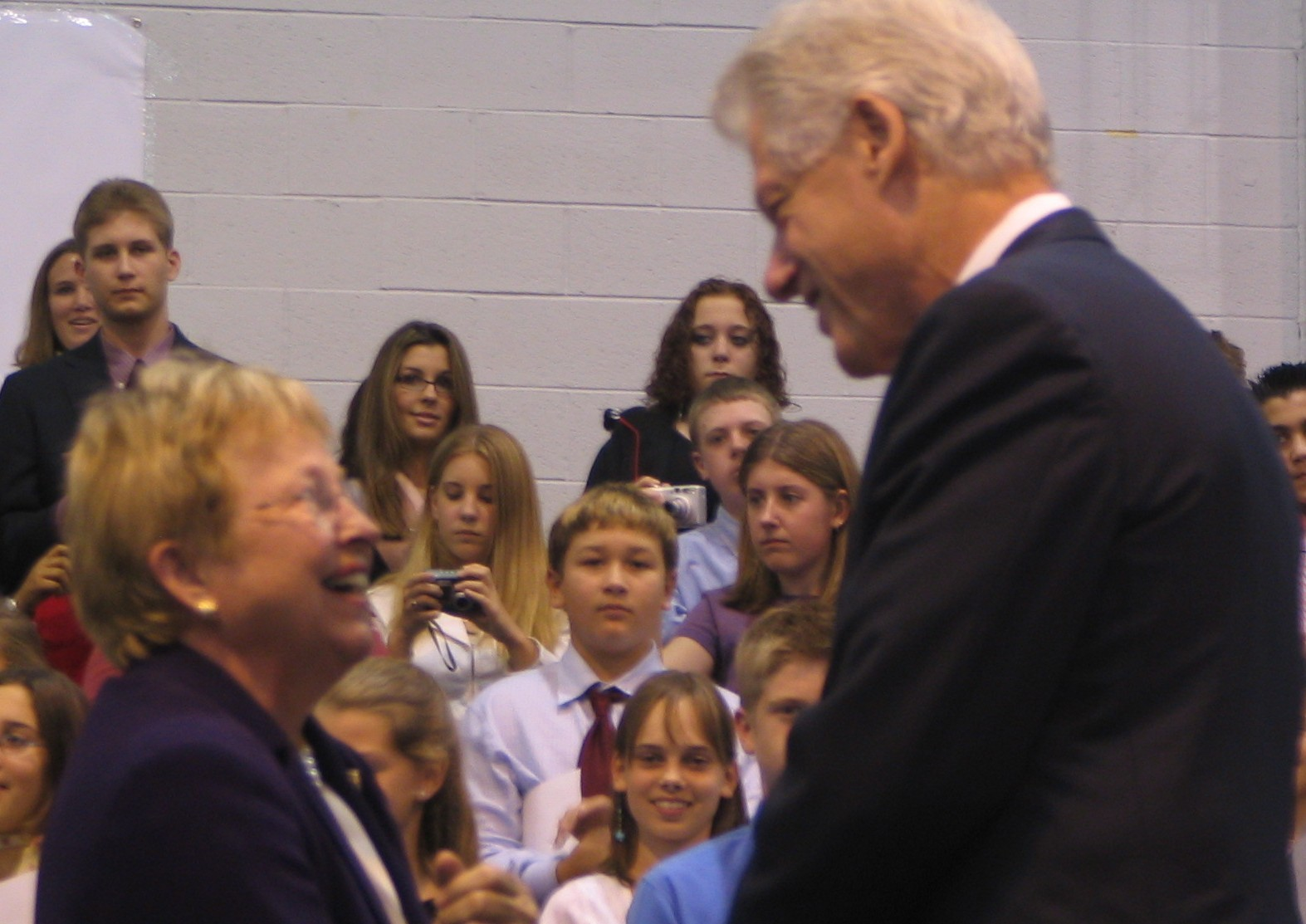
Johnson with former President Bill Clinton in 2005

Johnson was elected to the House of Representatives in 1982 with 52 percent of the vote, defeating Democratic state senator William E. Curry Jr. She replaced Democrat Anthony "Toby" Moffett, who made an unsuccessful bid for the U.S. Senate that year.

She won narrowly in her re-election bid in 1996, defeating Democrat Charlotte Koskoff 50–49, her only close race for re-election. She attributed her decreased percentage to the time she had spent on the House ethics panel, dealing with ethics allegations against Speaker Newt Gingrich, which prevented her from getting around in her district. She won in 1998, again against Koskoff, with 59% of the vote, and got 63% of the vote in 2000 against Paul Valenti.

Had Al Gore won the 2000 presidential election, Johnson was widely considered to be the front runner to win the appointment of Governor John G. Rowland to serve in the United States Senate, filling the seat of Gore's running mate Joe Lieberman. Lieberman had been reelected to the Senate at the same time as the presidential election.

In 2002, Johnson's New Britain-based district was merged with the Waterbury-based 5th District of Democratic Congressman James H. Maloney. While the new district retained Maloney's district number, its geography and demographics slightly favored Johnson. She won the general election over Maloney with 54% of the vote. In 2004, she defeated Democrat Theresa Gerratana, getting 60% of the vote.

=== 2006 re-election campaign ===
In the November 2006 general election, Johnson faced Democrat Chris Murphy, a state senator originally elected from the First District town of Southington, Connecticut, who now lives in Cheshire.

In April 2006, Johnson became the target of a negative ad campaign run by a political action committee, MoveOn.org, which alleged ties to disgraced lobbyist Jack Abramoff and former Majority Leader Tom DeLay (R-TX). Johnson responded with her own advertising campaign dismissing the charges and strongly attacking Murphy, accusing him of not disavowing the MoveOn attack ads.

Johnson had a large cash advantage over her challenger. In April 2006, Johnson reported that she had raised $436,000 in the first quarter of the year, with 60% of that coming from PACs, and 56% from contributors from outside Connecticut. In the second quarter of 2006 she raised almost $800,000, and had cash on hand, as of June 30, 2006, of $2.6 million.

In late October, Chris Murphy had a slight lead, and heading into the election, polls showed him ahead by four points. Johnson ultimately lost the race in November to Chris Murphy by 12 points; the only House incumbent to suffer a worse defeat was John Hostettler (IN-08).

Articles in the Hartford Courant speculated that Johnson's negative TV ads, which accused Murphy of coddling sex offenders and drug dealers, may have proven counterproductive. Johnson won only six of the district's 41 towns, losing many areas that had reliably supported her in the past. For instance, she lost badly in New Britain, an area she had represented for 30 years at both the federal and state level. She had failed to carry New Britain in her last two elections.

=== Ideology ===
Johnson is a moderate Republican. She called herself "an independent voice in Washington", although she frequently supported the mainstream Republican agenda. Some nonpartisan observers such as National Journal rated her near the ideological midpoint in the House, although others, like the American Conservative Union (ACU) rated her as a moderate conservative. The ACU gave Johnson's 2005 voting record 40 points out of 100; the liberal Americans for Democratic Action gave her 35 points. In general, she was moderate-to-liberal on social issues and conservative on economic ones.

Johnson is a member of several socially moderate Republican groups including The Wish List, The Republican Main Street Partnership, Republicans for Choice, the Republican Majority for Choice, and Republicans for Environmental Protection, now known as ConservAmerica, although she has supported many elements of President George W. Bush's agenda and the agenda of conservative House leaders.

In 1998, Johnson voted for two of the four articles of impeachment then-President Bill Clinton—the only member of the Connecticut delegation to support Clinton's impeachment.

In 2003, Johnson voted with the House Democrats to oppose Partial-Birth Abortion Ban Act. The bill was passed by a large majority 281–142 on October 2, 2003.

In 2006, Johnson attracted considerable controversy after voting against a Republican budget reconciliation bill that passed the House by two votes. She was one of 14 moderate Republicans who crossed party lines to side with Democrats against it.

=== Issues ===
Johnson is a strong supporter of Republican policy on health care and the Iraq War, but opposed the Bush energy agenda, including oil drilling in the Arctic National Wildlife Refuge (ANWR) refuge. She has received favorable marks and awards from such groups as the National Education Association and the Sierra Club.

In 2005, Johnson supported the White House plan to partially privatize Social Security, and voted for a measure sponsored by then-Majority Leader Tom DeLay that would have weakened House ethics rules.

One of Johnson's central issues is health care. She was one of the authors of the Medicare Part D prescription drug benefit program, which took effect in 2006. On May 15, 2006, Johnson announced she would submit legislation to waive penalties for those who miss deadlines to enroll in Medicare Part D, reacting to widespread criticism of the Johnson-authored program. Her bill was unsuccessful but was supported by the AARP.

She also authored the legislation that allowed welfare recipients to remain eligible for Medicaid, adding a more moderate influence to the welfare reform law.

=== Committees ===
In 1988, Johnson became the first Republican woman to be named to the powerful Ways and Means Committee. She eventually rose to chair three separate Ways and Means subcommittees.

With the retirement of Ways and Means Committee chairman Bill Thomas (R-CA) at the end of the 109th Congress in 2006, Johnson was a possible candidate to replace him as chairman if Republicans were to retain the House and Johnson retained her seat in the November elections. Neither happened.

In 1983, Johnson was one of the original congressional members of the United States House Select Committee on Children, Youth, and Families.

=== Campaign contributors ===
Connecticut is a center of the pharmaceutical industry with Pfizer and Bayer operating major facilities in the state. According to the nonpartisan OpenSecrets, Johnson had been one of the leading Congressional recipients of contributions from the pharmaceutical industry, receiving $534,830 in related contributions since 2000.

== Post-congressional career ==
Following her career in Congress, in 2007 Johnson became a resident fellow at Harvard University's Institute of Politics. She also served as co-chair of the Information Technology and Innovation Foundation, a public policy think tank.

In October 2007, Johnson endorsed former New York City Mayor Rudy Giuliani's bid for the Republican presidential nomination.

In 2013, Johnson was a signatory to an amicus curiae brief submitted to the Supreme Court in support of same-sex marriage during the Hollingsworth v. Perry case.

== Personal life ==
Johnson married Theodore Johnson, an obstetrics and gynaecology (OBGYN) physician, on July 12, 1958 in Harpenden, England; the Johnsons would have three daughters. Theodore died on December 21, 2025 at age 93.

== See also ==
- Women in the United States House of Representatives

U.S. House of Representatives
Preceded by Toby Moffett	Member of the U.S. House of Representatives from Connecticut's 6th congressional district 1983–2003	Constituency abolished
Preceded by Connie Morella	Chair of the Congressional Women's Caucus; 1997–1999	Succeeded by Sue Kelly
Preceded by Jim Maloney	Member of the U.S. House of Representatives from Connecticut's 5th congressional district 2003–2007	Succeeded by Chris Murphy
Preceded by Jim McDermott	Chair of the House Ethics Committee; 1995–1997	Succeeded by Jim Hansen
Party political offices
New office	Chair of the Tuesday Group; 1995–2005; Served alongside: Mike Castle, Fred Upton	Succeeded by Charles Bass; Mark Kirk
U.S. order of precedence (ceremonial)
Preceded by Frank LoBiondo as Former U.S. Representative	Order of precedence of the United States as Former U.S. Representative	Succeeded by Jim Moran as Former U.S. Representative
