= Kenneth Washington (engineer) =

VP of Software Engineering at Amazon, US

Kenneth Edward Washington
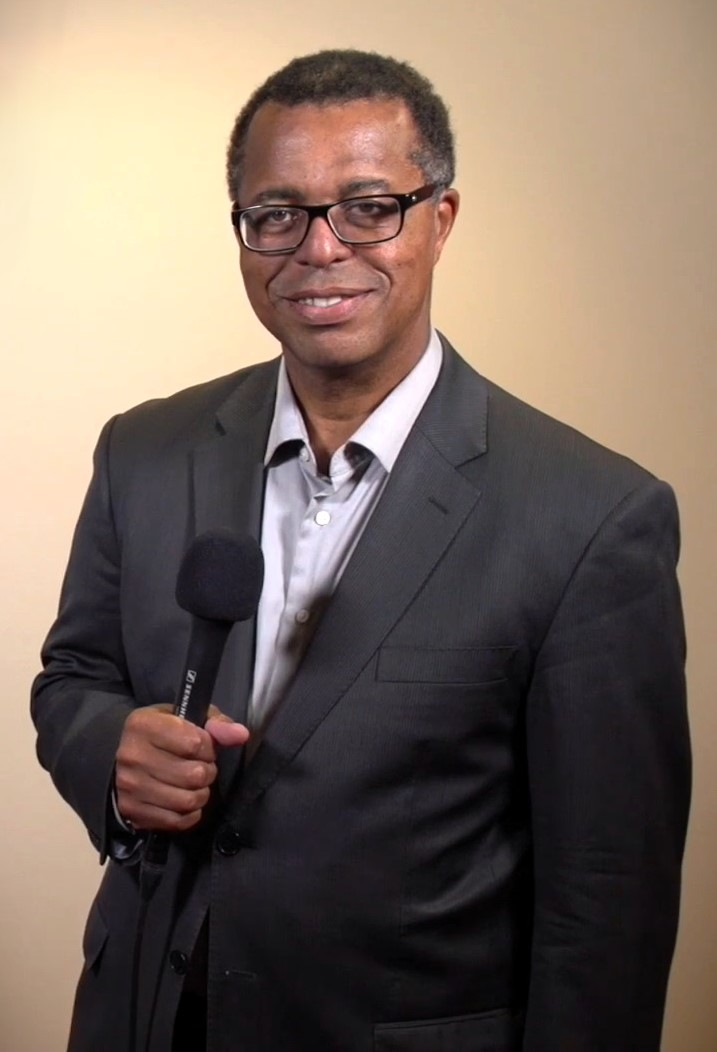
- Washington in 2016
- Education: Texas A&M University (BS, MS, PhD)
- Scientific career
- Workplaces: Medtronic; Amazon; Sandia National Laboratories; Ford Motor Company; Lockheed Martin
- Thesis: High order numerical solutions to time dependent advection-diffusion problems (1983)

Kenneth Washington is an American engineer and vice president of software engineering at Amazon and senior vice president and chief technology and innovation officer. At Amazon, Washington is responsible for new devices and services. He previously served as chief technology officer at Ford Motor Company. He was elected to the National Academy of Engineering in 2024.

== Early life and education ==
Washington grew up in inner-city Chicago. As a child he was passionate about robotics and science and had a toy Erector Set. At the age of twelve, his father completed his own doctorate, and his family moved to Milwaukee. His father became a lecturer at Marquette University. During middle school, Washington relocated to Texas, where he became increasingly aware of the energy crisis. He eventually completed three degrees in nuclear engineering at Texas A&M University, where he became the first African American to earn a doctorate in nuclear engineering. His doctoral research considered high-order numerical solutions for advection-diffusion problems. After earning his doctorate, Washington joined Sandia National Laboratories. Here he was part of the first team that showed it was possible to join off-the-rack computers together and get them to act like a supercomputer. After a few years he was made Director of Distributed Computing at the Sandia California site.

== Career ==
Washington was eventually made chief information officer at Sandia National Laboratories. He moved to Lockheed Martin as Chief Technology Officer. He was made vice president of the Space Systems Advanced Technology Center and specialized in cybersecurity.

In 2014 Washington joined Ford Motor Company as Chief Technology Officer. He was responsible for the design and delivery of the technology strategy, including the identification of new materials, as well as emerging propulsion, automation, and manufacturing systems. In 2021, Washington left Ford to join Amazon.

At Amazon, Washington was responsible for consumer robotics. Specifically, he oversaw the development of Astro, Amazon's first household robot. In 2023 he was named Senior Vice President and Chief Technology and Innovation Officer at Medtronic.

== Awards and honors ==
- 2012 Black Engineer of the Year Award in Research Leadership
- 2020 Elected to the National Academy of Engineering
- 2022 Texas A&M University College of Engineering Outstanding Alumnus
- 2023 Black Engineer of the Year
