= James P. Pigott =

American politician (1852–1919)

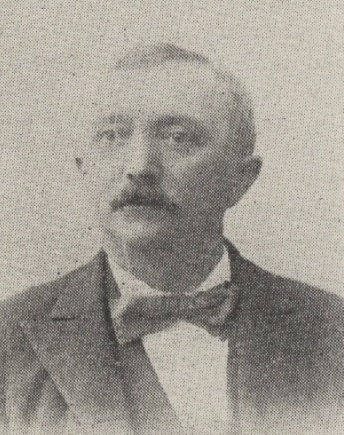

Member of the U.S. House of Representatives from Connecticut's 2nd district
- In office March 4, 1893 – March 3, 1895
- Preceded by: Washington F. Willcox
- Succeeded by: Nehemiah D. Sperry

Member of the Connecticut House of Representatives
- In office 1885–1886

Personal details
- Born: James Protus Pigott; September 11, 1852 New Haven, Connecticut; United States
- Died: July 1, 1919 (aged 66) New Haven, Connecticut; United States
- Resting place: St. Lawrence Cemetery
- Party: Democratic Party
- Spouse: Mary Agnes (Brady) Pigott
- Children: James Protus Pigott, Jr.,
- Parent(s): Patrick Pigott; Margaret (Dennehy) Pigott
- Education: Yale Law School; Yale University

James Protus Pigott (September 11, 1852 – July 1, 1919) was an American lawyer and politician who served one term as a U.S. representative from Connecticut from 1893 to 1895.

== Early life and career ==
Born in New Haven, Connecticut, Pigott attended the common schools and graduated from Yale College in 1878, where he served on the fifth editorial board of The Yale Record in his junior year. In his senior year, Pigott was a founding editor of the Yale Daily News.

After graduating from Yale Law School in 1880, he was admitted to the bar in the same year and commenced the practice of law in New Haven.

== Political career ==
He served as New Haven city clerk from 1881 to 1884.

Pigott served as member of the State House of Representatives in 1885 and 1886, a delegate and speaker at the Democratic National Convention in 1888, and a delegate at the Democratic National Convention in 1900.

=== Congress ===
Pigott was elected as a Democrat to the Fifty-third Congress (March 4, 1893 – March 3, 1895). He was not reelected for a second term, and resumed the practice of law.

== Death and burial ==
He died in New Haven, July 1, 1919, and was interred in the St. Lawrence Cemetery.

== Family ==
His brother-in-law, James T. Mullen, was the first Supreme Knight of the Order of the Knights of Columbus.

His nephew, William P. Cronan, served as the 19th Naval Governor of Guam.

== Sources ==
- United States Congress. "James P. Pigott (id: P000344)". Biographical Directory of the United States Congress.
- "James Protus Pigott". Obituary Record of Yale Graduates 1919-1920. New Haven: Yale University. August, 1920.

U.S. House of Representatives
Preceded by Carlos French	Member of the U.S. House of Representatives from Connecticut's 2nd congressional district 1893–1895	Succeeded by Nehemiah D. Sperry
