= Strong School =

Coordinates: 41.3095°N 72.8902°W

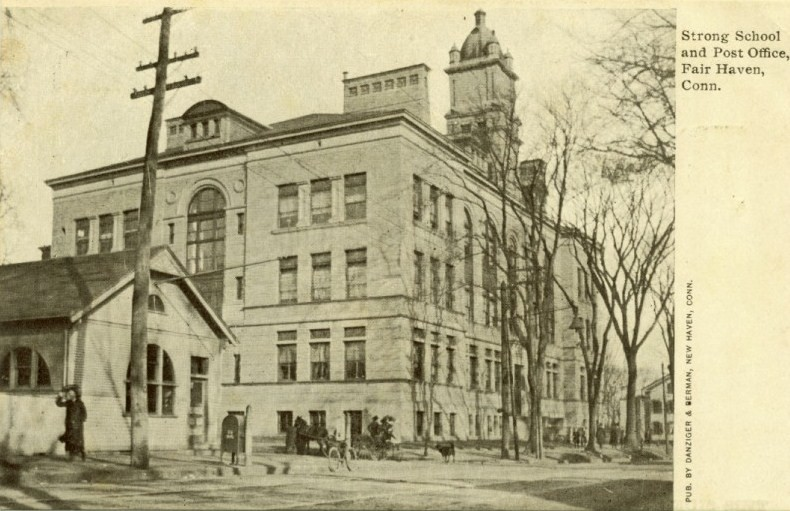
Strong School and Post Office

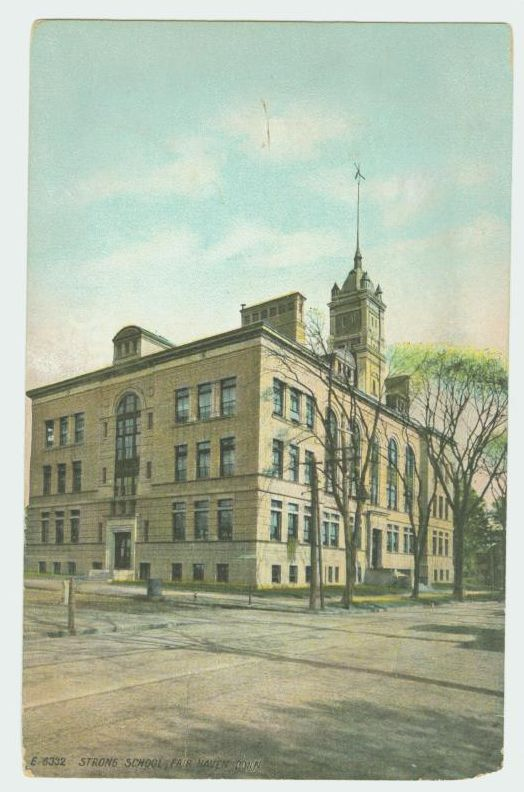
Strong School, from a postcard postmarked 1915

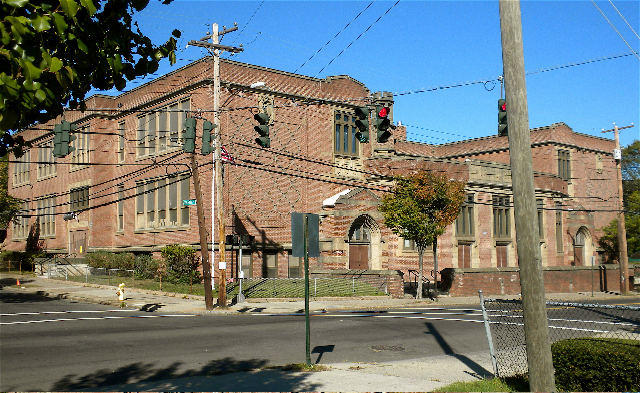
Strong School in 2010.

Strong School is a school located at 69 Grand Ave. in the Fair Haven neighborhood of New Haven, Connecticut, USA. It is an overflow school for district kindergartners and first graders. It has a student population of approximately 277 utilizing a 1.055-acre (4,270 m^{2}) site.

== Structures ==
=== First building (1808–?) ===
Nathaniel Graniss, an early area settler, felt there was need for a school in the area, and deeded land where a school was built in 1808. The building was renovated into a church in 1830, and school rooms were relegated to the basement. The church moved down the street to occupy a different building in 1864, and the building was once again utilized entirely as a school. The facility was then named after Theodore Dwight Woolsey. In 1873, another school was constructed on Woolsey Street, taking up the Woolsey School name. The original building was then renamed Grand Street School or Fair Haven School.

=== Second building (1895–1914) ===
A new building replaced the old one in 1895 and was renamed the Horace H. Strong School after a Warden for Fair Haven and member of the Fair Haven Board of Education. The building burned down on January 27, 1914.

=== Third building (1915–2011) ===
The third structure was built in 1915 at 69 Grand Ave in the Collegiate Tudor style of architecture. While at this site, it was an overflow school for district kindergartners and first graders. It had a student population of approximately 277 utilizing a 1.055-acre (4,270 m^{2}) site.

=== Fourth building (2011–present) ===
Strong School was moved in 2011 to the former Vincent Mauro school, located Orchard Street in New Haven.
