= Clinton Avenue School =

Coordinates: 41.3183°N 72.8927°W

Location
- 293 Clinton Avenue; New Haven, Connecticut; United States

Information
- Type: Public elementary
- Motto: "We Care. We learn. We Achieve"
- Established: 1911
- Principal: Dr. Jamie Coady
- Grades: K–8
- Enrollment: 469
- Colors: White and blue
- Mascot: Cougar

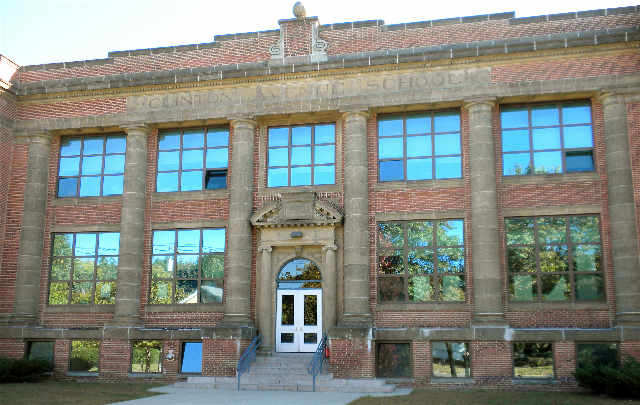
Clinton Avenue School, 1911 façade, Brown & von Beren

Clinton Avenue School is a bilingual (American English and Spanish) school located at 293 Clinton Avenue in the Fair Haven neighborhood of New Haven, Connecticut, United States. It was built in 1911 and underwent extensive renovations beginning in 2004. The original design was similar to the nearby Truman School, both Beaux Arts style buildings.

== Renovations ==
The school taught kindergarten through fourth grade with an enrollment of 410 students until its temporary closure. Its size was approximately 58,000 square feet (5,400 m²). Renovations by Boroson Falconer Architects & Engineers, headed by Ken Boroson, was completed in 2005, enlarging the school by over 36,000 square feet (3,300 m²), with a new total area of 94,000 square feet (8,700 m²). The enrollment increased to 650, supporting kindergarten through eighth grade. The cost of renovations was $25,106,000 USD Rededication took place on October 23, 2005.

Along with the renovations was the installation of a commissioned sculpture by Douglas Kornfeld called the "Tree of Life", a 17' tall laser-cut bright red steel tree.

== Demographics ==
In 2022 the enrollment was 78% Hispanic, 12% African American, 7% white, 2% Two or more races, 1% Unspecified and under 1% Native American

== Principals ==
- Francis J. Smith (1960, 1961)
- John Leary (?-1983)
- Richard Whitney (1983–1986)
- Pat DeRenzo (1986–2004)
- Carmen Ana Rodriguez-Robles (2005–2016)
- Kristina DeNegre (2016-2020)
- Dr. Jamie Coady (2020–Present)
