= Erector Square =

Industrial warehouse in New Haven, U.S.

Coordinates: 41.316°N 72.9°W

Erector Square LLC is a 11-building, three-story brick industrial warehouse complex located at the intersection of Blatchley Avenue and Peck Street in the Fair Haven neighborhood of New Haven, Connecticut.

== History ==
The complex originally housed the factory for making Erector Set toys, invented by Alfred Carlton Gilbert. The last official toy sets were produced there in 1967 and the company then went out of business. The Gilbert Co. assets were purchased by Gabriel Toys and moved to Lancaster, Pennsylvania.

Today, Erector Square LLC is managed locally by Capp Associates LLC and is home to Erector Square Studios a community of working artists, creative and wellness professionals. The complex has nearly 150 studios ranging in size from 160 to 10,000 square feet. A growing number of well-known artists have recently made New Haven home and the community at Erector Square includes established and emerging artists, researchers, architects, designers, dance, theater, yoga and pilates professionals.

== Visual Artists of Note at Erector Square ==
A number of established artists produce work from studios at Erector Square. Well known visual artists include: Faustin Adeniran., Atelier Cue Barac, Marsha Borden., Mark Breslin., Michael Brownstein, Claudine Burns Smith., David Chorney., Phyllis Crowley., Jan Cunningham, Jennifer Davies, Leila Daw, Geoffrey Detrani, Anne Eisner, John Fallon, Oi Fortin., Jason Friedes, Kathryn Frund., Eliska Greenpoon, Bob Gregson, Karen Hibbs, Kyle Kearson, Esthea Kim, Judith Kruger, David Kuehler, Jihyun Lee., Todd Lyon, Heather Mahoney, Eric March., Alecia Massaro., Fethi Meghelli., Linda Mickens., Christian Miller, Irene Miller., Margot Nimirosk., Liz Pagano., Mary Elizabeth Peterson., Hannah Petrikovsky, Peyton Peyton., Mark Previtt., Keith Rancourt, Leo Rebolledo, Valerie Richardson, Annie Sailer., Sarah Stewart, Willie Stewart., Paul Theriault., Renee Valenti, Katya Vetrov., Janet Warner., and Marian Wittink.

== Performance Artists in Residence at Erector Square ==
Annie Sailer.

== Photographers at Erector Square ==
Karissa Van Tassell

== Architects at Erector Square ==
Kenneth Boroson Architects

== Annual Open Studios at Erector Square ==
The Erector Square campus is one of the main locations for the yearly Open Source Arts Festival sponsored by Artspace, a non-profit arts organization.
