= Quinnipiac River Historic District =

Historic district in Connecticut, United States

- U.S. National Register of Historic Places
- U.S. Historic district
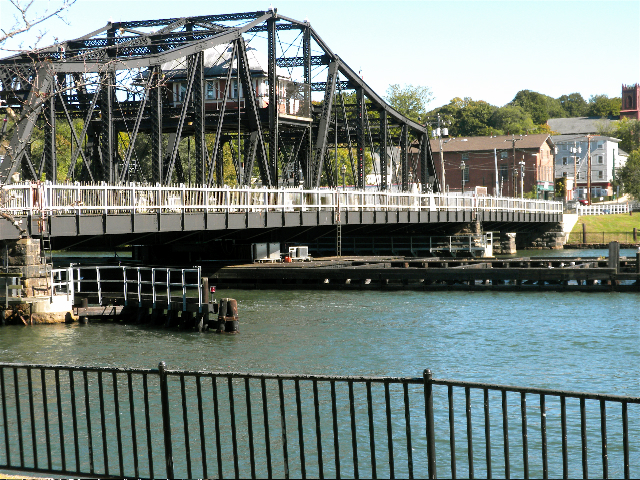
- Grand Avenue Bridge (1896).

- Location within Connecticut Location within the United States
- Location: East Haven, Connecticut
- Coordinates: 41°18′35″N 72°52′59″W
- Area: 313 acres (127 ha)
- Architectural style: Greek Revival, Italianate, Queen Anne
- NRHP reference No.: 84001139
- Added to NRHP: June 28, 1984

Quinnipiac River Historic District is a 313-acre (127 ha) historic district straddling the Quinnipiac River in the Fair Haven and Fair Haven Heights neighborhoods of New Haven, Connecticut. It encompasses most of the historic maritime village of Fair Haven, with a history dating back to the 18th century. It was listed on the National Register of Historic Places in 1984. At that time it included 524 contributing buildings, an inland wetland at the mouth of Hemingway Creek on the northeast corner of the district, and the Grand Avenue Swing Bridge over the Quinnipiac River connecting Fair Haven with Fair Haven Heights at the center of the district.

The historic Fair Haven village developed beginning in the early 18th century, around a ferry crossing of the Quinnipiac River, now the site of the Grand Avenue bridge. It was a mainly agricultural outpost of New Haven, whose development was further spurred by the construction of the first bridge on that site in 1790. A few taverns and houses surviving in the district from this period. Owners of waterfront properties adjacent to extensive mudflats engaged in the harvesting and processing of oysters, which became a major economic activity in the area by the mid-19th century. Fair Haven was annexed to New Haven in 1871, and subsequently participated in that city's industrial expansion, developing in part as a streetcar suburb while still focused on oyster processing and related industries.

== Gallery ==
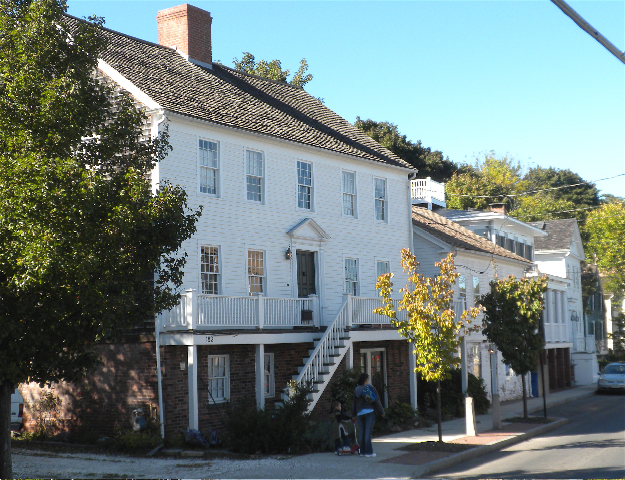
Original Stephen Rowe's tavern and store (1804), 182 Front Street, and other houses of the early 19th century oystering village on Front Street North of the Grand Avenue Bridge.

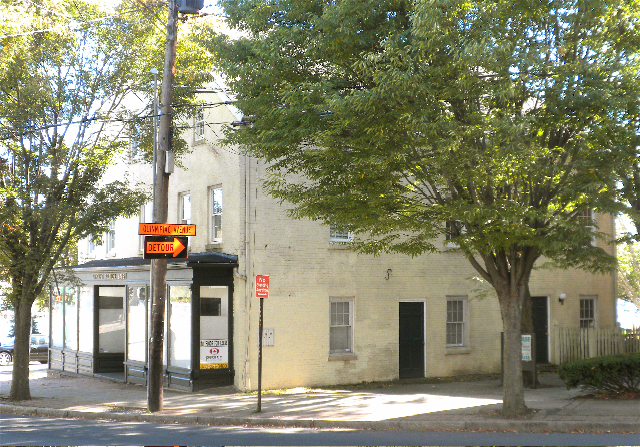
King's Block (1816), 20 Grand Avenue

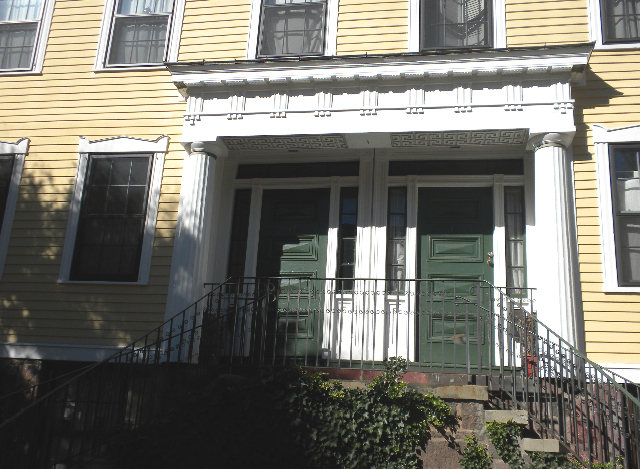
Recessed Doric porch of double Greek revival house, 37-39 Grand Avenue, Fair Haven.

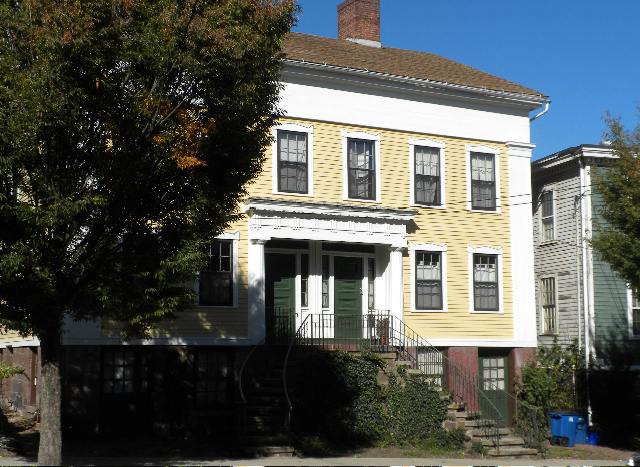
Double Greek revival house, 37-39 Grand Avenue.

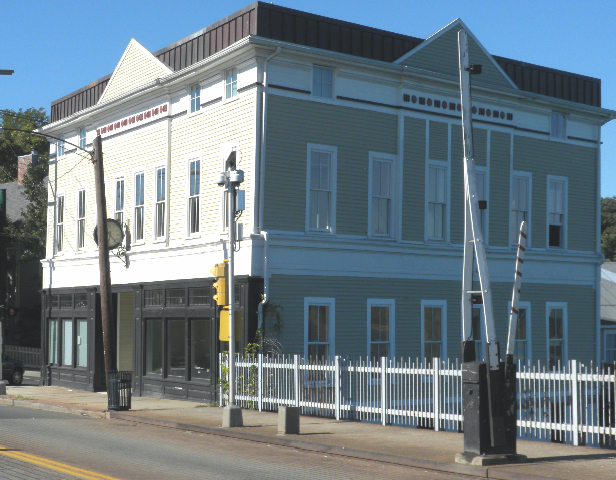
One Grand Avenue (1890s)

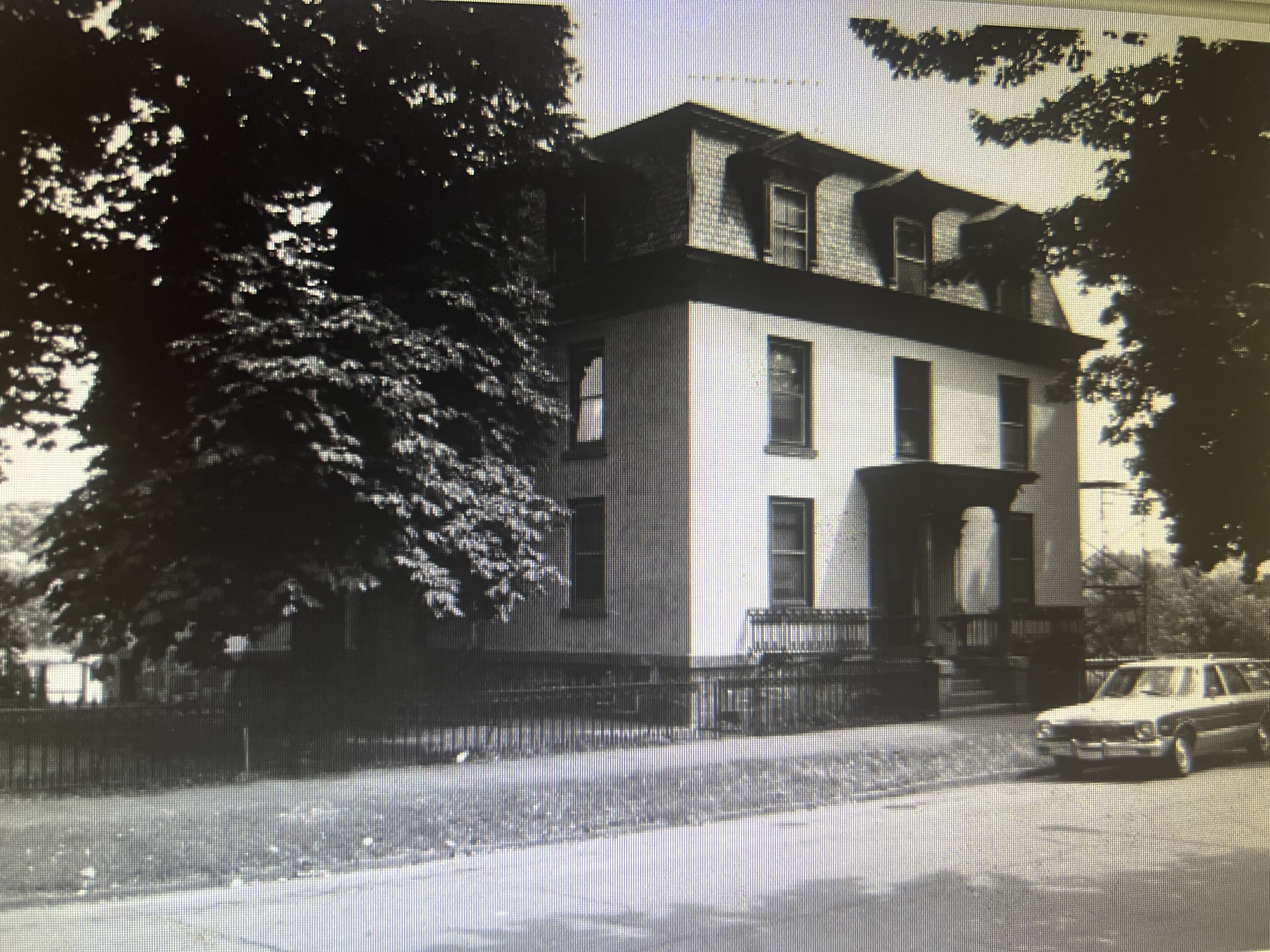
The Samuel Hemingway House (c.1852) Italianate architecture, remodeled in the Second Empire Style in the 1870s, 37 East Pearl Street

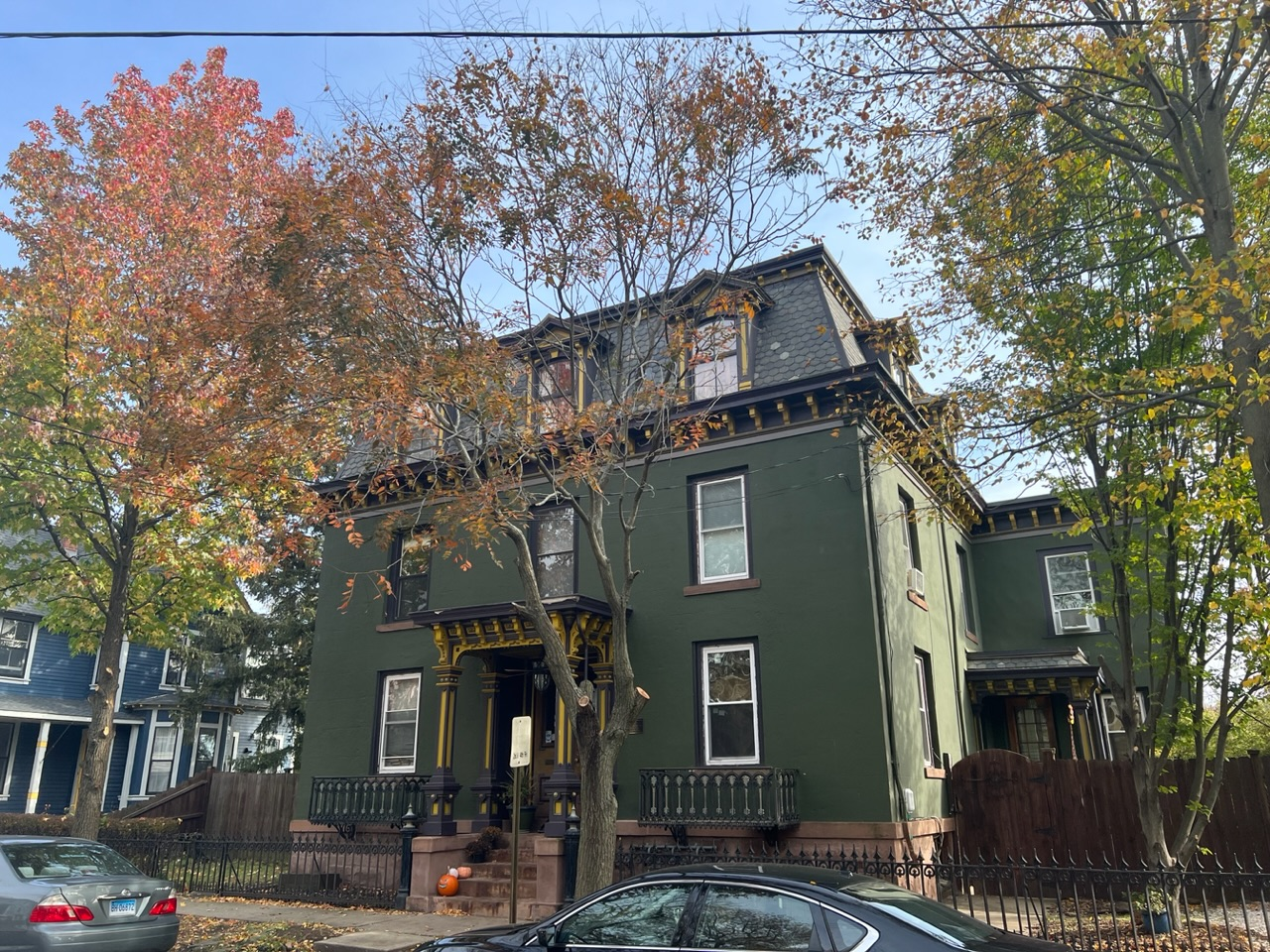
The Samuel Hemingway House at 37 East Pearl Street (c.1852)

== See also ==
- National Register of Historic Places listings in New Haven, Connecticut
