= James Phelps (politician) =

American judge

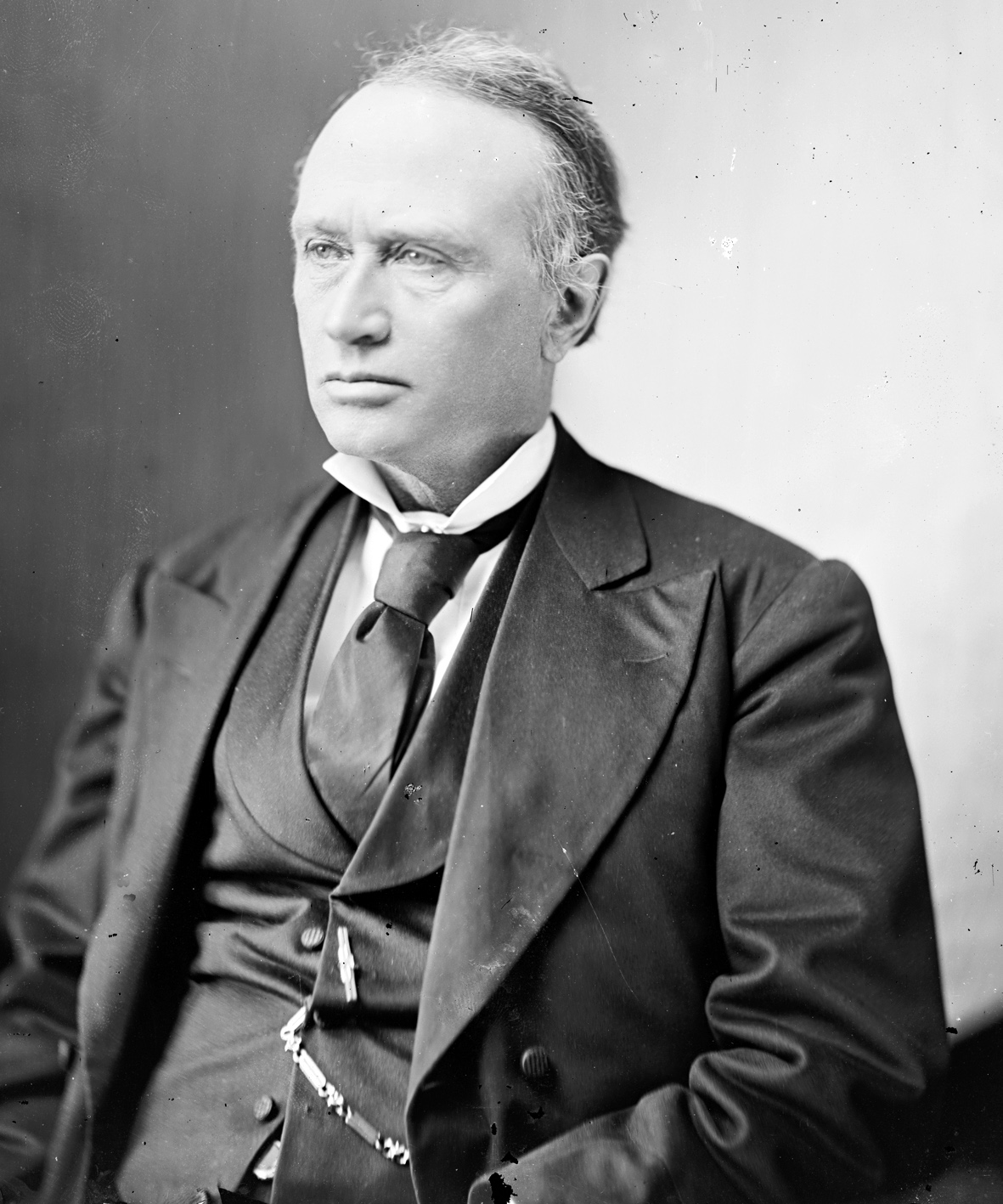

Member of the U.S. House of Representatives from Connecticut's 2nd district
- In office March 4, 1875 – March 3, 1883
- Preceded by: Stephen Wright Kellogg
- Succeeded by: Charles Le Moyne Mitchell

Member of the Connecticut Senate
- In office 1858-1859

Member of the Connecticut House of Representatives
- In office 1853; 1854; 1856

Personal details
- Born: James Phelps; January 12, 1822 Colebrook, Connecticut, U.S.
- Died: January 15, 1900 (aged 78) Essex, Connecticut, U.S.
- Resting place: River View Cemetery, Essex, Connecticut, U.S.
- Party: Democratic
- Parent: Lancelot Phelps (father)

James Phelps (January 12, 1822 – January 15, 1900) was an American lawyer and politician who served four terms as a U.S. Representative from Connecticut from 1875 to 1883.

He was the son of Lancelot Phelps.

== Biography ==
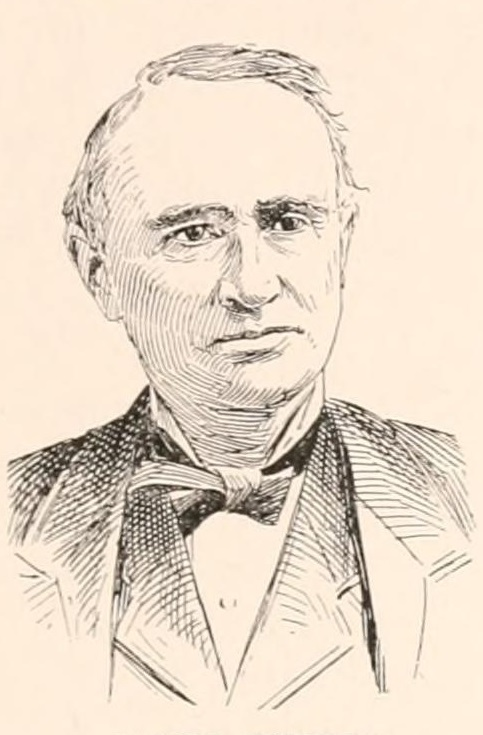
James Phelps as depicted in 1891's Illustrated Popular Biography of Connecticut.

Born in Colebrook, Connecticut, Phelps attended the public schools, the Episcopal Academy in Cheshire, Connecticut, Trinity College of Hartford, Connecticut, and Yale Law School.

Phelps completed his legal education in the offices of Samuel Ingham and Isaac Toucey, was admitted to the bar in 1845 and commenced practice in Essex, Connecticut.

=== Early political career ===
In 1853, 1854, and 1856, Phelps served in the Connecticut House of Representatives. He served in the Connecticut State Senate in 1858 and 1859.

Phelps served as judge of the superior court of Connecticut from 1863 to 1873. He served as judge of Connecticut's supreme court of errors from 1873 until his resignation in 1875.

=== Congress ===
Phelps was elected as a Democrat to the 44th and three succeeding Congresses, serving from March 4, 1875 to March 3, 1883.

=== Later career ===
He declined to be a candidate for renomination in 1882, and resumed the practice of law.

He served again as judge of the superior court from 1885 to 1892. He resumed practicing law and was also active in banking.

He served as a delegate to several Democratic state conventions.

== Death and burial ==
Phelps died in Essex on January 15, 1900. He was interred at River View Cemetery in Essex.

== Family ==
Phelps was married to Lydia Ingham, the daughter of Samuel Ingham.

U.S. House of Representatives
Preceded by Stephen Wright Kellogg	Member of the U.S. House of Representatives from Connecticut's 2nd congressional district 1875–1883	Succeeded by Charles Le Moyne Mitchell
