= Nehemiah D. Sperry =

American politician (1827–1911)

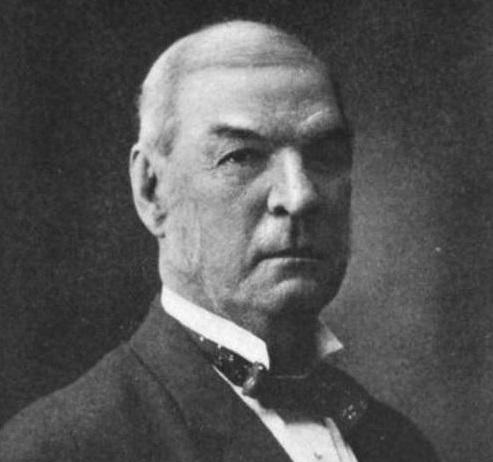
- Sperry in 1918

Member of the U.S. House of Representatives from Connecticut's 2nd district
- In office March 4, 1895 – March 3, 1911
- Preceded by: James P. Pigott
- Succeeded by: Thomas L. Reilly

Secretary of the State of Connecticut
- In office 1855–1857
- Preceded by: Oliver H. Perry
- Succeeded by: Orville H. Platt

Personal details
- Born: July 10, 1827 Woodbridge, Connecticut, U.S.
- Died: November 13, 1911 (aged 84) New Haven, Connecticut, U.S.
- Resting place: Evergreen Cemetery
- Party: Republican

Nehemiah Day Sperry (July 10, 1827 – November 13, 1911) was an American educator and businessman who served as a U.S. representative from Connecticut for eight consecutive terms from 1895 to 1911.

== Biography ==
Born in Woodbridge, Connecticut, Sperry was the third of six children of Enoch Sperry and Mary Atlanta Sperry. His eldest sibling Lucien Wells Sperry served as the 23rd mayor of New Haven, CT from 1866 to 1869. Nehemiah attended the common schools and a private school in New Haven. He taught school for several years, learning the trades of building and masonry in his spare time, and then partnered with his brother-in-law to form the contracting firm Smith & Sperry, among the top builders in New Haven after the Civil War. His home, built in 1857 at 466 Orange Street in New Haven, is listed among the Historic Buildings of Connecticut.

== Political career ==
Sperry was first a member of the Whig Party. He served as a member of the New Haven common council and as a selectman in 1853, and as an Alderman in 1854. He served as Secretary of the State of Connecticut in 1855 and 1856.

In June 1855, Sperry attended the Know-Nothing Party Convention in Philadelphia where a platform was formulated. A strong opponent of slavery, Sperry became a Republican and served as chairman of the Republican State committee for a number of years, before and during the Civil War. He served as delegate to the Republican National Conventions in 1856, 1864, and 1888, serving as member and secretary of the national and executive committees. During the Civil War, he served as chairman of the recruiting committee of New Haven. He was appointed by President Lincoln, with whom he enjoyed a personal relationship, in 1861 as postmaster of New Haven, and served until removed by President Cleveland in 1886. He was again appointed postmaster by President Harrison, serving from 1890 to 1894.

=== Congress ===
Sperry was elected as a Republican to the 54th and to the seven succeeding Congresses (March 4, 1895 – March 3, 1911). He served as chairman of the Committee on Alcohol Liquor Traffic (56th through 61st Congresses). He is considered the originator of the Rural Free Delivery system of the U.S. Mail, with the Rural Delivery Act which he introduced in 1895. He was not a candidate for renomination in 1910.

== Death and burial ==
He died in New Haven, Connecticut, on November 13, 1911, aged 84. He was interred in Evergreen Cemetery.

Political offices
Preceded by Oliver H. Perry	Secretary of the State of Connecticut; 1855–1857	Succeeded by Orville H. Platt
U.S. House of Representatives
Preceded by James P. Pigott	Member of the U.S. House of Representatives from Connecticut's 2nd congressional district 1895–1911	Succeeded by Thomas L. Reilly
