= Charles L. Mitchell =

American politician

Charles Le Moyne Mitchell
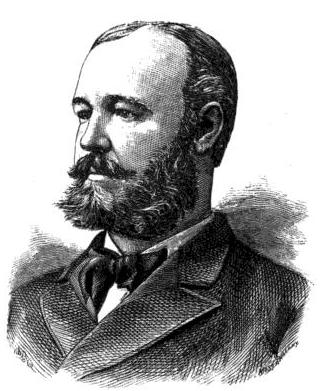

Member of the U.S. House of Representatives from Connecticut's 2nd district
- In office March 4, 1883 – March 3, 1887
- Preceded by: James Phelps
- Succeeded by: Carlos French

Personal details
- Born: August 6, 1844 New Haven, Connecticut, U.S.
- Died: March 1, 1890 (aged 45) New York, New York, U.S
- Resting place: Evergreen Cemetery
- Party: Democratic

Charles Le Moyne Mitchell (August 6, 1844 – March 1, 1890) was an American businessman and politician who served four terms as a U.S. representative from Connecticut from 1875 to 1883.

== Biography ==
Born in New Haven, Connecticut, Mitchell was graduated from Cheshire Academy in 1863. Traveled in Europe, Asia, and Africa.

He returned to New Haven, Connecticut, and engaged in the manufacture of silver-plated ware and brass. He served as a member of the State house of representatives in 1877.

=== Congress ===
Mitchell was elected as a Democrat to the Forty-eighth and Forty-ninth Congresses (March 4, 1883 – March 3, 1887). He served as chairman of the Committee on Patents (Forty-ninth Congress).

He was not a candidate for renomination in 1886 and moved to New York City. But retained his former business interests in Connecticut.

=== Death and burial ===
He died in New York City March 1, 1890. He was interred in Evergreen Cemetery, New Haven, Connecticut.

U.S. House of Representatives
Preceded by James Phelps	Member of the U.S. House of Representatives from Connecticut's 2nd congressional district 1883–1887	Succeeded by Carlos French
