= Herman Hotchkiss =

Early settler of East Haven, Connecticut

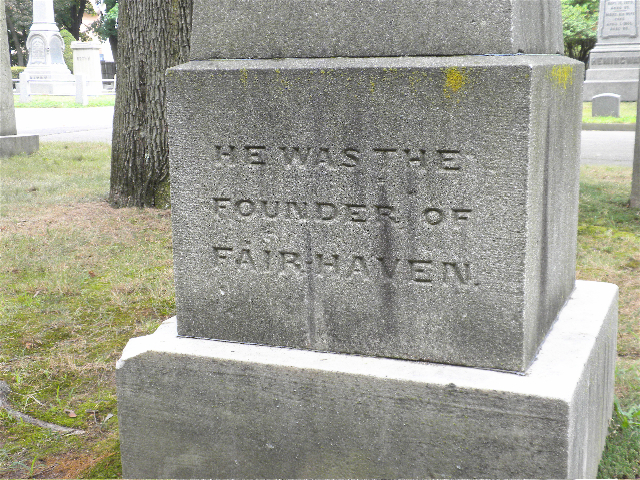
Inscription on Herman Hotchkiss’ grave marker: “He was the founder of Fair Haven."

Herman Hotchkiss (July 1, 1765 – February 20, 1836) was an early settler of East Haven, Connecticut and is credited as the founder of Fair Haven, Connecticut. While he was not the first European to discover the area—others had done so in 1639—Hotchkiss played a pivotal role in its development through his numerous investments, which ultimately spurred the community's growth.

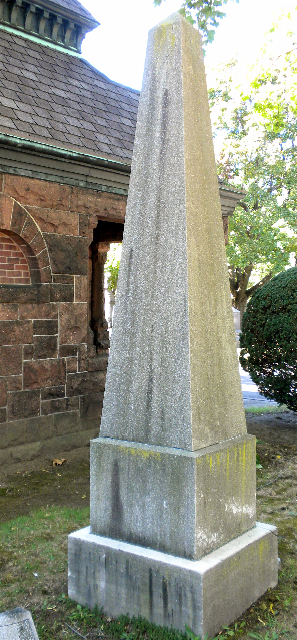
Obelisk marking the grave of Herman Hotchkiss in Fair Haven Union Cemetery.

Records from North Congregational Church in New Haven, Connecticut list a marriage between Herman Hotchkiss and Elizabeth Ford on July 28, 1793.

In 1806, Hotchkiss built the first permanent house in Fair Haven, a two-story dwelling, along with a barn and horsesheds. Recognizing the area's commercial potential, Hotchkiss, along with his business partner James Barnes, purchased land from Nathaniel Granniss in 1811 on both sides of the planned Dragon Bridge. The two entrepreneurs then constructed wharves, a mercantile store, a tavern, and a hotel, laying the groundwork for the community's development. Hotchkiss continued to acquire land in the area until his death in February 1836.

Hotchkiss was buried at Fair Haven Union Cemetery.
