= Washington F. Willcox =

American politician (1834–1909)

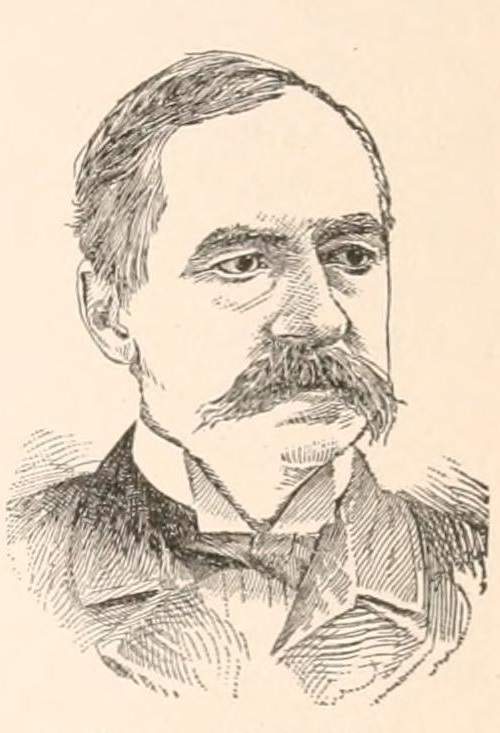

Member of the U.S. House of Representatives from Connecticut's 2nd district
- In office March 4, 1889 – March 3, 1893
- Preceded by: Carlos French
- Succeeded by: James P. Pigott

Personal details
- Born: August 22, 1834 Killingworth, Connecticut, U.S.
- Died: March 8, 1909 (aged 74) Chester, Connecticut, U.S.
- Resting place: Fountain Hill Cemetery
- Education: Yale Law School

Washington Frederick Willcox (August 22, 1834 – March 8, 1909) was an American businessman and politician who served two terms as a U.S. representative from Connecticut from 1889 to 1893.

== Biography ==
Born in Killingworth, Connecticut, Willcox prepared for college at Madison Academy and Hopkins Grammar School. He graduated from Yale Law School in 1862. He was admitted to the bar and commenced practice in Deep River, Connecticut.

=== Political career ===
He served as member of the Connecticut House of Representatives in 1862 and 1863. From 1875 to 1876 he served in the Connecticut State Senate. He was State's attorney of Middlesex County from 1875 to 1883.

==== Congress ====
Willcox was elected as a Democrat to the Fifty-first and Fifty-second Congresses (March 4, 1889 – March 3, 1893). He was not a candidate for renomination in 1892.

=== Later career ===
He resumed the practice of law in Deep River, and also engaged in banking. From 1897 to 1905 he served on the state Railroad Commission.

=== Death and burial ===
He died at his home in Chester, Connecticut, March 8, 1909, and was buried at Fountain Hill Cemetery in Deep River.

U.S. House of Representatives
Preceded by Carlos French	Member of the U.S. House of Representatives from Connecticut's 2nd congressional district 1889–1893	Succeeded by James P. Pigott
