= River Street Historic District (New Haven, Connecticut) =

Historic district in Connecticut, United States

- U.S. National Register of Historic Places
- U.S. Historic district
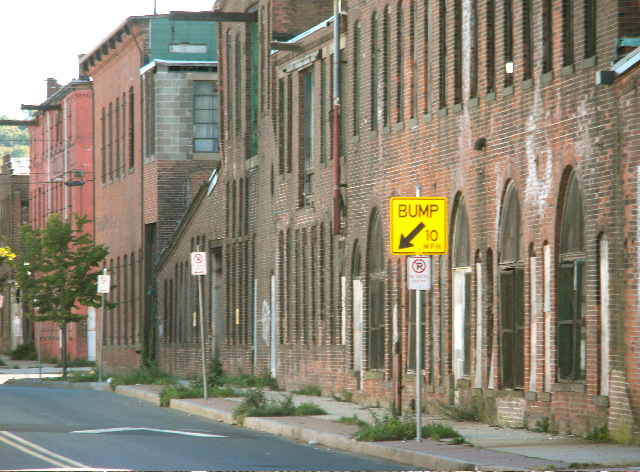
- River Street, Fair Haven

- Location within Connecticut Location within the United States
- Location: Roughly bounded by Chapel Street, Blatchley Avenue, New Haven Harbor, and James Street, New Haven, Connecticut
- Coordinates: 41°18′8″N 72°54′4″W
- Area: 8.5 acres (3.4 ha)
- NRHP reference No.: 88003213
- Added to NRHP: January 26, 1989

The River Street Historic District encompasses a historic industrial area in the Fair Haven section of New Haven, Connecticut. Located south of Chapel Street between James Street and Blatchley Avenue, the industrial buildings here date to New Haven's growth as a major industrial center between the American Civil War and World War I, with significant emphasis on metalworking businesses. The district was listed on the National Register of Historic Places in 1989.

== Description and history ==
The River Street Historic District occupies about 8.5 acres (3.4 ha) on the southern end of the Fair Haven Peninsula, with harbor frontage to the south. It includes three large industrial complexes dating from the 1870s to the 1910s, with most buildings constructed out of load-bearing brick or masonry. It is significant in New Haven's industrial history as the site of several metals-related manufacturing enterprises. It includes the Dutee Wilcox Flint auto plant, a nail manufacturing plant, the complex of the National Pipe Bending Company, and others.

The area developed as a major industrial area after the Civil War due to New Haven's status as a major railroad junction, with ready access to nearby railroads and a supply of both skilled and unskilled labor from immigration and the city's earlier industries. In 1869, Hobart Bigelow expanded his boiler manufacturing operation to a new location in Fair Haven, and in 1883 he established National Pipe Bending, which manufactured parts for use in his boilers. The area reached its largest extent due to war-related manufacturing in World War I, and declined thereafter. The layout of the buildings was made to maximize access to railroad access spurs that ran along what are now some of the area's roads.

== See also ==
- National Register of Historic Places listings in New Haven, Connecticut

== Gallery ==
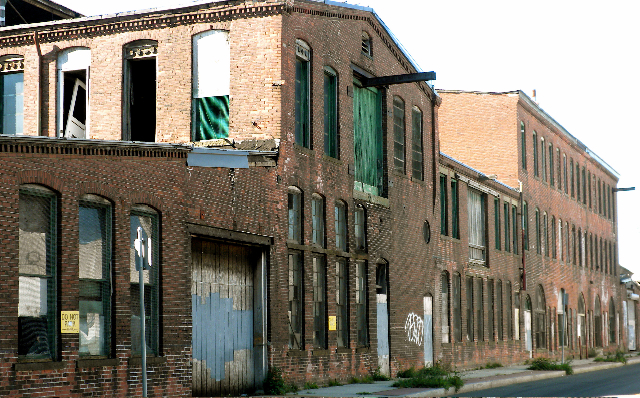
Bigelow Boiler Co. (1902-1921), River and Lloyd Streets, Fair Haven.

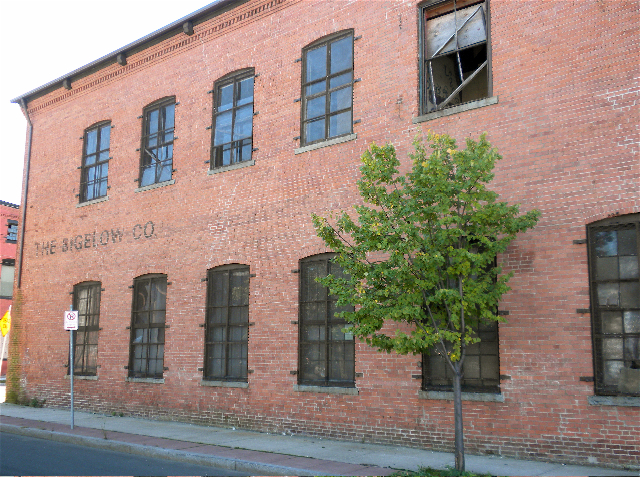
Bigelow Boiler Co. (1902-1921), River and Lloyd Streets, Fair Haven.

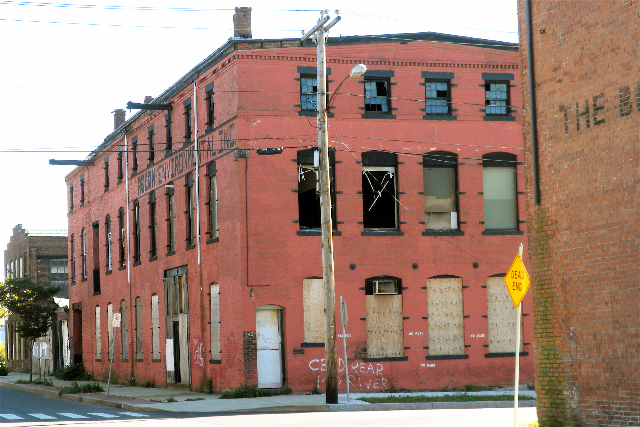
National Pipe Bending Co. (1890–93), River and Lloyd Streets, Fair Haven.

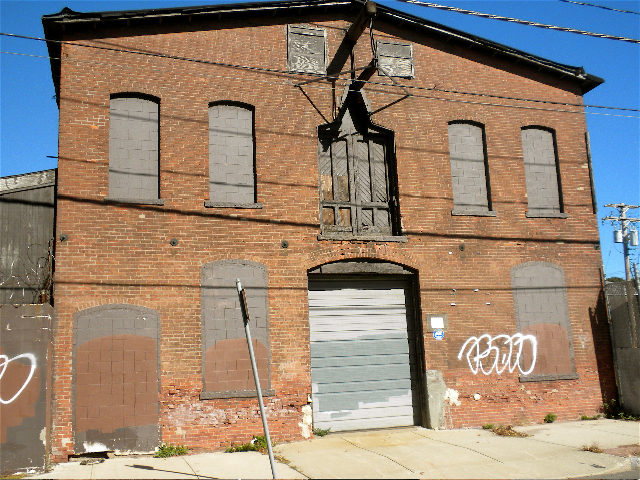
River Street, Fair Haven.

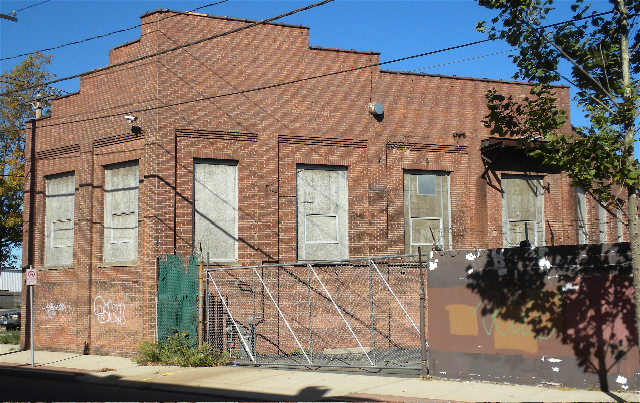
River Street, Fair Haven.

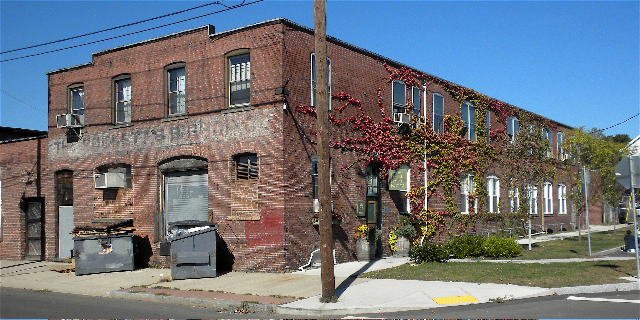
Industrial building now Fairhaven Furniture, River Street and Blatchley Avenue, Fair Haven.
