= Fair Haven Union Cemetery =

Historic cemetery in New Haven County, Connecticut

Coordinates: 41.3092°N 72.893°W

Fair Haven Union Cemetery, located at 149 Grand Ave., covers 7 acres (28,000 m^{2}) in the neighborhood of Fair Haven, Connecticut. Although graves were there as early as 1803, the land was donated for the cemetery by local farmers Stephen Rowe and Nathaniel Granniss in 1808. The site included land for a meeting house, a school, and parade grounds, as well as 1-acre (4,000 m^{2}) for burial, holding 80 lots. A Victorian Gothic entry arch was added in 1885 inscribed with a quote from Revelation 14:13, "They rest from their labors."

In April 2006, the cemetery was evaluated for restoration. Including a formal cost study and beautification. Recommendations included protection from intruders and vandals, as well as different fencing to block out the view of adjacent housing. The area Cemetery Board declined to pursue the recommendations, but agreed to consider nominating the site for addition to the National Register of Historic Places.

== Burials ==
There are 207 families buried in the cemetery, comprising 706 names and 17 headstones with given names only. The most heavily represented families are Rowe (151), Barnes, Smith, and Mallory (each with 70+). Others include Granniss (27) and Farren (24) Ball (20).

Many of the burials are early Fair Haven seamen; those engaged in clamming, oystering, and shipbuilding and repair. Also buried there is Herman Hotchkiss, traditional founder of Fair Haven.

== Chapel ==
The chapel on the site was built over the graves of the friendless using stone quarried from the red brick clay of Fair Haven Heights for $4,000. The structure possesses a genuine Tiffany window. A time capsule was placed behind a corner brick in 1895.

== Gallery ==
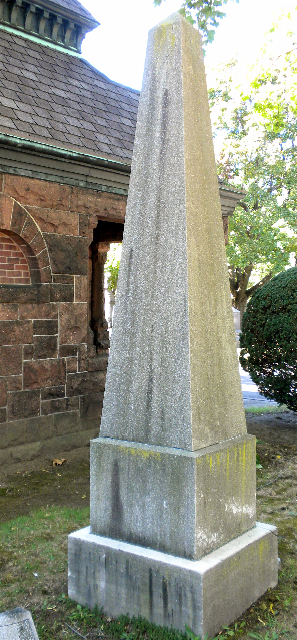
Obelisk marking the grave of Herman Hotchkiss (1765-1836), traditional founder of Fair Haven.

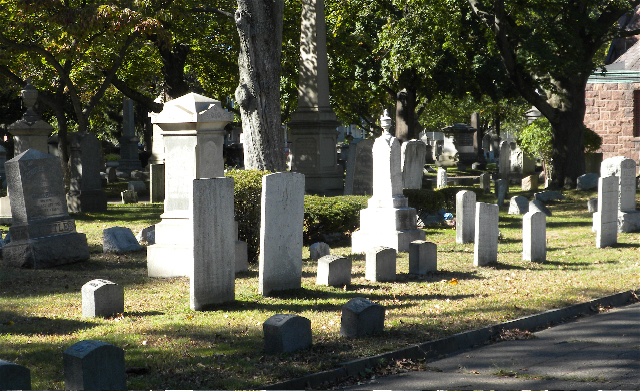
Graves in Fair Haven Union Cemetery.

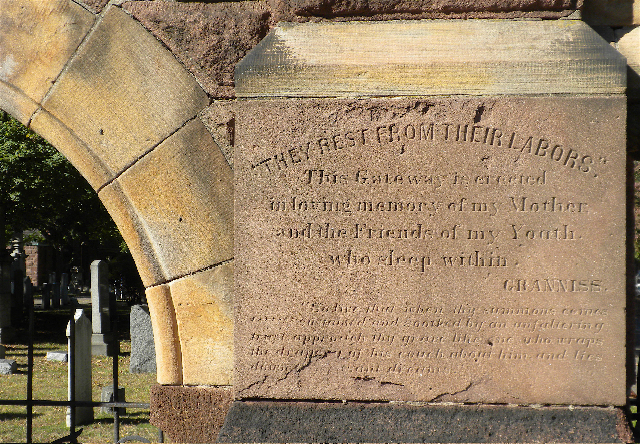
The Granniss family inscription on the cemetery gateway: “They rest from their labors.”

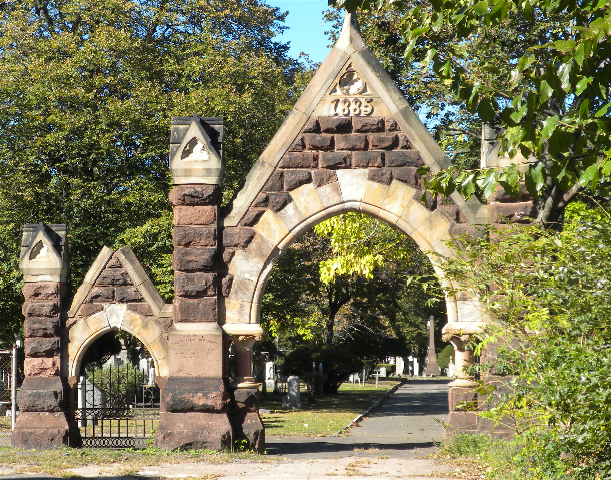
Monumental gateway of Fair Haven Union Cemetery.

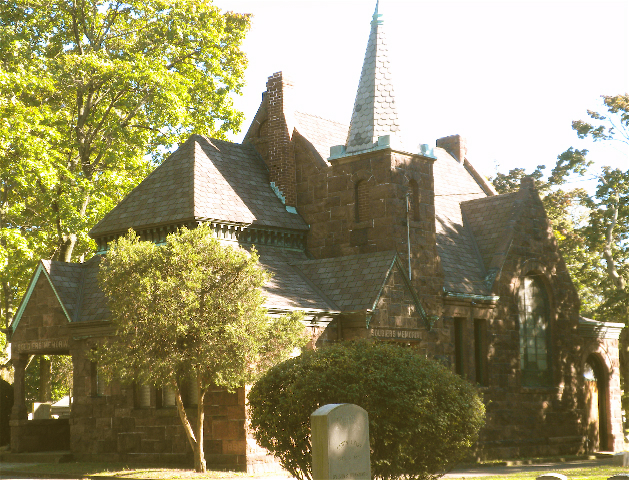
Soldiers Memorial Chapel (1895).
