= Fair Haven, New Haven =

Neighborhood in New Haven, Connecticut

Fair Haven
- Neighborhood of New Haven
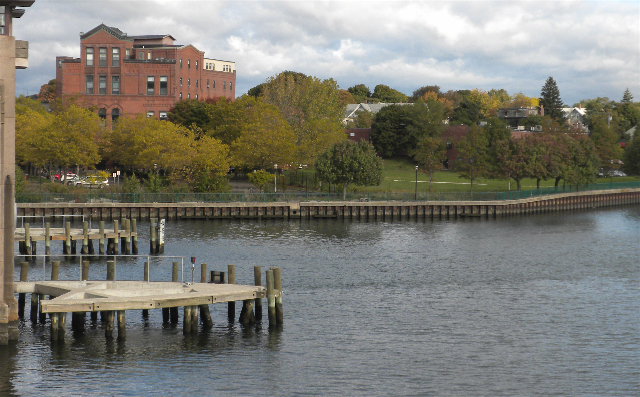
- View of the Quinnipiac Brewery from the Ferry Street Bridge

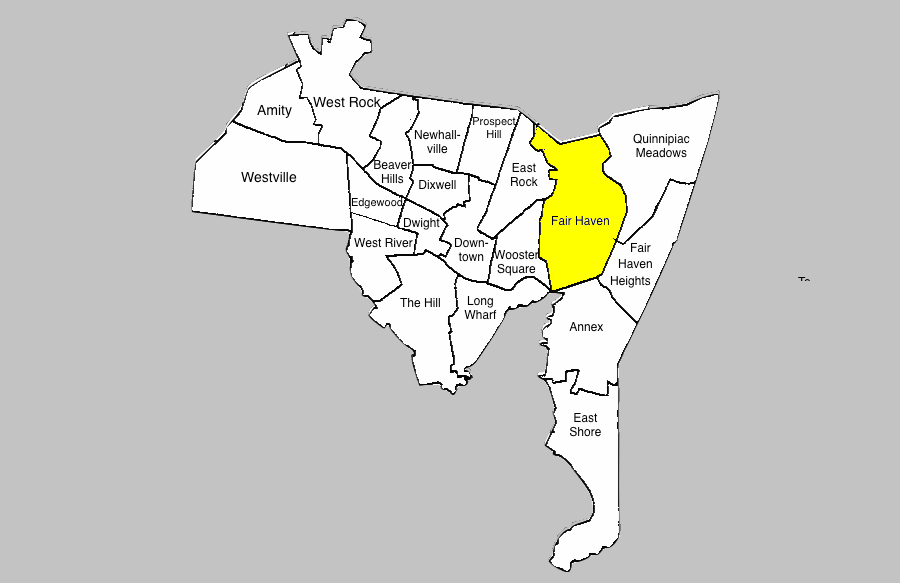
- Fair Haven within New Haven
- Coordinates: 41°18′40″N 72°53′46″W
- Country: United States
- State: Connecticut
- City: New Haven

Fair Haven is a neighborhood in the eastern part of the city of New Haven, Connecticut, between the Mill and Quinnipiac Rivers. The northeast section of the neighborhood is also known as Chatham Square.

Fair Haven is located about two miles east of the New Haven Green comprising New Haven wards 14, 15, 16, and a portion of 8. It is bounded on the east and south by the Quinnipiac River, on the west by the Mill River, on the northwest by Amtrak railroad tracks, and on the north by I-91 (in the vicinity of Exit 7). The main through routes of the area are Grand Avenue, Blatchley Avenue, and Ferry Street.

In its early days, the area was called by a succession of names including Farmes, East Farmes, The Neck, Dragon, and Clamtown. Herman Hotchkiss is credited as founder due to his investments and development.

Fair Haven is not to be confused with the adjacent Fair Haven Heights neighborhood.

== History ==
=== 17th century ===
Prior to its founding by European settlers, Fair Haven was used by the Momauguin group of Quinnipiack Native Americans for farming.

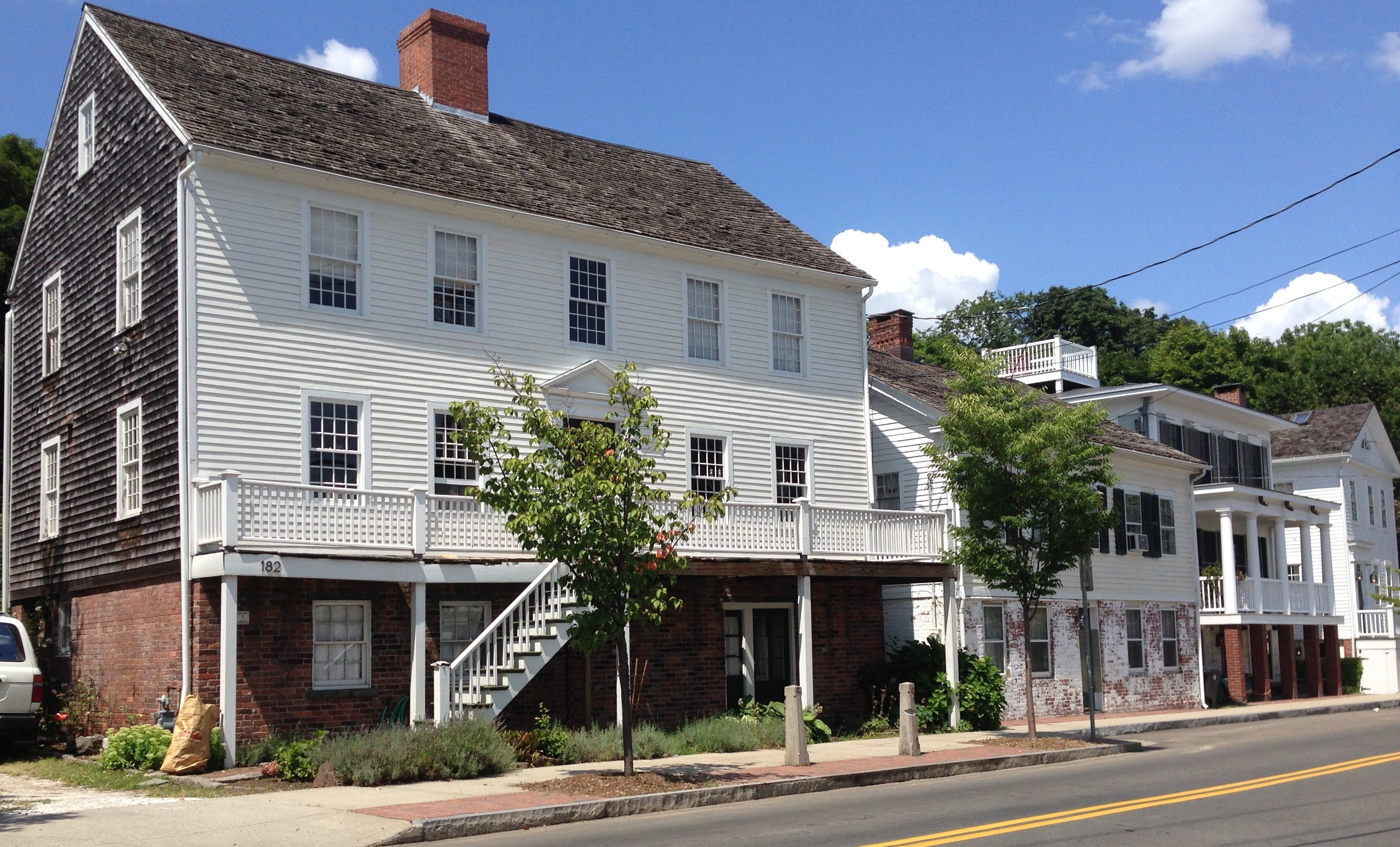
Historic homes on Front Street

It is said that in 1639, when Captain Richard Russell first viewed the harbor, "The sight of the harbor did so please the Captain of the ship, that they called it a Fayre Haven." In 1640, the area currently called Fair Haven was named 'The Neck'. Fair Haven was originally a village formed in 1679 to house industrial workers, as the area was a source of oysters and other products of the rivers and nearby harbor. It is said to have produced almost 5,000 gallons of oysters per day in season when at its peak. Besides oyster houses, manufacturing plants and a brewery were established. In the beginning, Fair Haven could only be reached by boat, on foot, or on horseback. In time, dirt roads were laid, for use by horse-drawn vehicles.

=== 18th century ===
In 1784 Fair Haven became a part of the city of New Haven. The Pardee Family of East Haven began a ferry service across the Quinnipiac in 1785. The service was discontinued in 1791 with the construction of the Dragon Bridge.

=== 19th century ===
In 1806, land was donated for Fair Haven Union Cemetery.

By 1808, Fair Haven had 50 houses.

In 1820, the first apartment building for multiple residences was built.

In 1824, residents changed the name of their home from 'Dragon' to 'Fair Haven'.

By 1830, the oyster beds were dried up.

In 1835, importation of oysters began, with the supply being replenished by 1900.

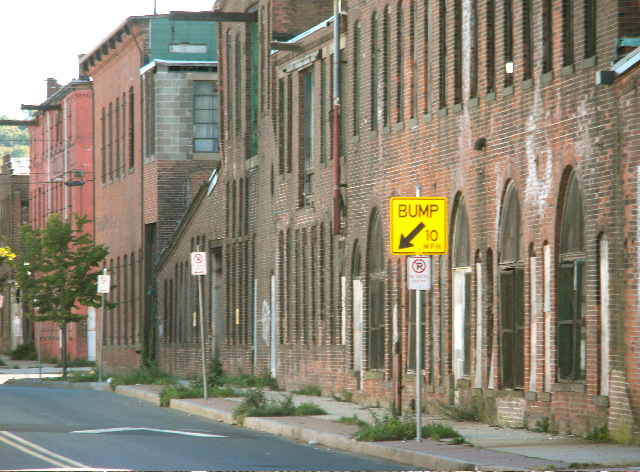
Factory buildings on River Street

In 1837 Fair Haven withdrew from the jurisdiction of New Haven.

A number of homes in Fair Haven were used to hide slaves in the Underground Railroad.

By the time of the Civil War, some streets had been paved. There was an influx of immigrants after the war, notably Irish, German, Polish, Italian and Russian. One area with a large number of Irish was nicknamed 'little Dublin'.

In 1860, a group of local businessmen drew up a charter to build and operate a horsecar line of one or two tracks between Fair Haven and Westville.

In 1866, Samuel L. Blatchley developed Blatchley Avenue, building moderately-priced homes for local workers.

St. Francis Church held its first service in 1867.

In 1870 Fair Haven rejoined New Haven.

In 1881 Ferry Street School was opened.

In 1885, Nathaniel Graniss donated land for the construction of the First Quinnipiac School.

In 1888, Lancraft Fife and Drum Corps organized, practiced in Ed Lancraft's Oyster house.

=== 20th century ===
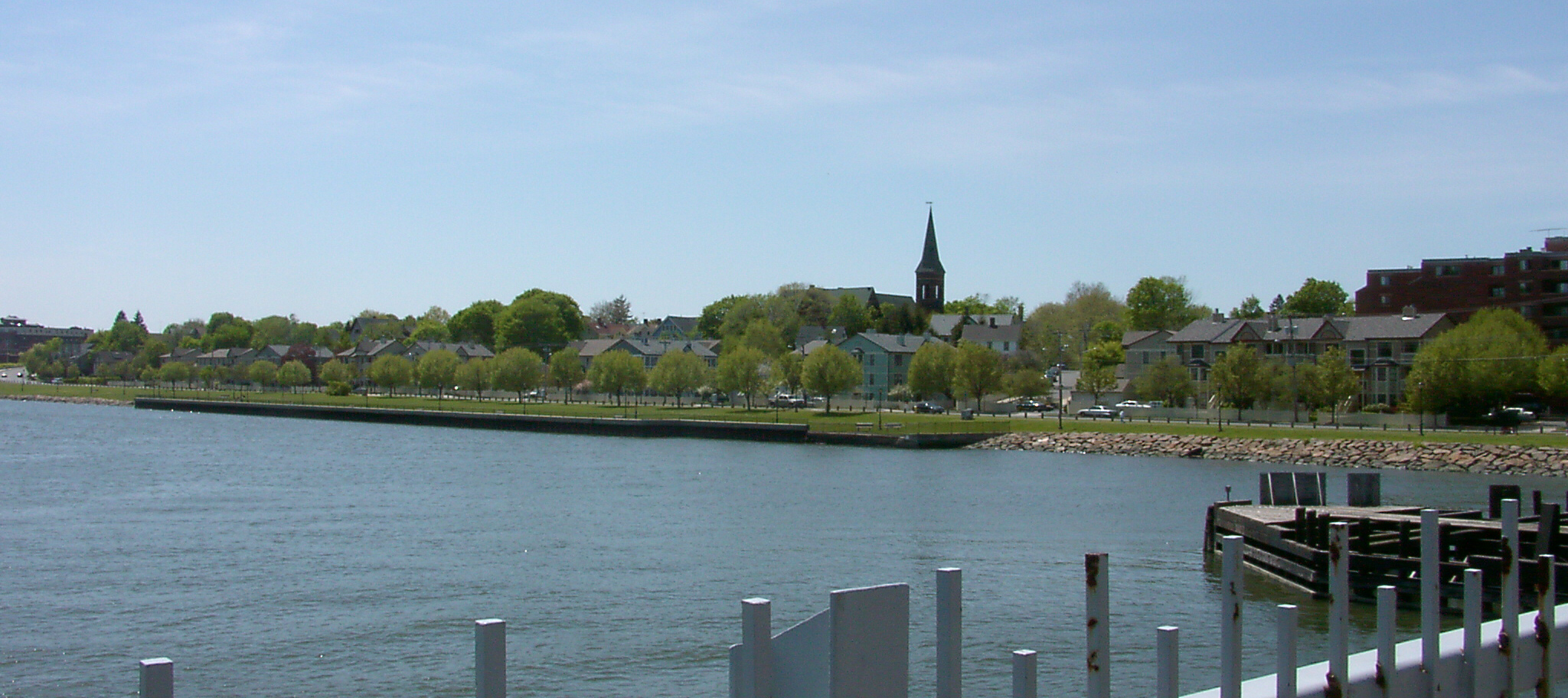
The southern portion of Front Street in Fair Haven, as seen from the Grand Avenue Bridge in May, 2005.

By the 1930s, Fair Haven was home to more immigrants than 'natives'. Many black and Puerto Rican families migrated into Fair Haven by the 1960s. Redevelopment occurred along the Quinnipiac River.

As part of Mayor Richard C. Lee's urban renewal program, 107 Fair Haven households were displaced in the 1960s.

In 1978, a local historic district was created.

In the early 1980s, many buildings on Grand Avenue were renovated.

=== 21st century ===
The waterfront area (Front Street and adjacent streets) have been redeveloped in the last decade, including construction of luxury condominiums, renovation of the Fair Haven marina, demolition of the Quinnipiac Terrace public housing project and replacement with a Cape Cod style village with both subsidized and market rate units, and the renovation of many of the old oyster houses. This part of Fair Haven has attracted a culturally diverse mix of young professionals, students, artists, and families with children. Other parts of Fair Haven continue to struggle with poverty related problems such as crime and homelessness.

In 2010, a 100 kW wind turbine was erected near Criscuolo Park, which can be seen from much of New Haven.

== Historical populations ==
- 1808 - 150 (15 families)
- 1837 - 1,000
- 1850 - 1,317
- 1870 - 5,600
- 1930 - 23,960
- 1989 - 13,895
- 1990 - 14,545
- 2000 - 13,753 (4,724 households)

== Flora and fauna ==
Aside from stray cats and dogs, other small animals that can be found in Fair Haven include mice, urban frogs, opossums, raccoons, and squirrels. Common birds include blue jays, feral pigeons, robins, and starlings. Along Dover Beach, there are scuds and caddisflies. Plants include the autumn olive, the beach rose, Spartina alterniflora, Rosa virginiana, and the weeping willow.

== Notable sites ==
- A. C. Gilbert Company
- Barnesville Bridge (carrying Grand Ave over the Mill River)
- The Bigelow Company
- Clinton Avenue School (built in 1911)
- Erector Square
- Ezekiel Cheever School
- Fair Haven Middle School (built in 1927)
- Fair Haven Union Cemetery
- First Church
- Grace Church
- Grand Avenue Bridge (built in 1896; the 3rd bridge on the site).
- Grapevine Point
- John Rowe's tavern
- King's Hotel
- Lewis Bridge (carries Middletown Ave. across the Quinnipiac River)
- Methodist Episcopal Church (originally a Congregational Church)
- National Folding Box Company (In Cedar Hill (New Haven) once a community of Fair Haven)
- National Pipe Bending Company
- New Haven Brewing Company
- Quinnipiac River Historic District
- Quinnipiac River State Park
- River Street Historic District
- Regan Metal Corporation (began in 1887)
- St. Donato Roman Catholic Church (built in 1915)
- St. Francis Roman Catholic Church
- St. Rose Roman Catholic Church (built in 1908)
- Strong School (built in 1916)
- Tomlinson Bridge (built 1796–98)
- Quinnipiac Brewery

== Bibliography ==
=== Digital ===
- A River Runs Through It - A Brief History of Fair Haven
- CTSchools.net - Clinton Avenue School
- The Community and You: Learning Your Way Around Fair Haven
- DataHaven
- Fair Haven: An Historical and Ecological Field Study
- Fair Haven Community and the Grand Avenue Bridge
- Fair Haven Walking Tour
- The Fair Haven & Westville Railroad
- New Haven Vital Statistics
- Population of Connecticut Towns 1756-1820

=== Print ===
- Harrison's Illustrated Guide: Greater New Haven ISBN 0-927054-39-6
- Images of America: New Haven - Reshaping the City 1900-1980 ISBN 0-7385-1032-7
- New Haven - A Guide to Architecture and Urban Design ISBN 0-300-01993-9
- The Streets of New Haven - The Origin of Their Names, 2nd edition 1998 ISBN 0-943143-02-0
- Three Centuries of New Haven - The Tercentenary History ISBN 0-300-00812-0
