= Ferry Street School =

Location
- 611 Ferry Street; New Haven, Connecticut; United States

Information
- Established: 1881

Ferry Street School was a school located at 611 Ferry St. in the Fair Haven neighborhood of New Haven, Connecticut, USA. The school was open for 57 years, from 1881 to 1938.

In the 1950s, the abandoned site was eyed for use by a fire station, but the plan never materialized.
