= Carlos French =

American politician (1835–1903)

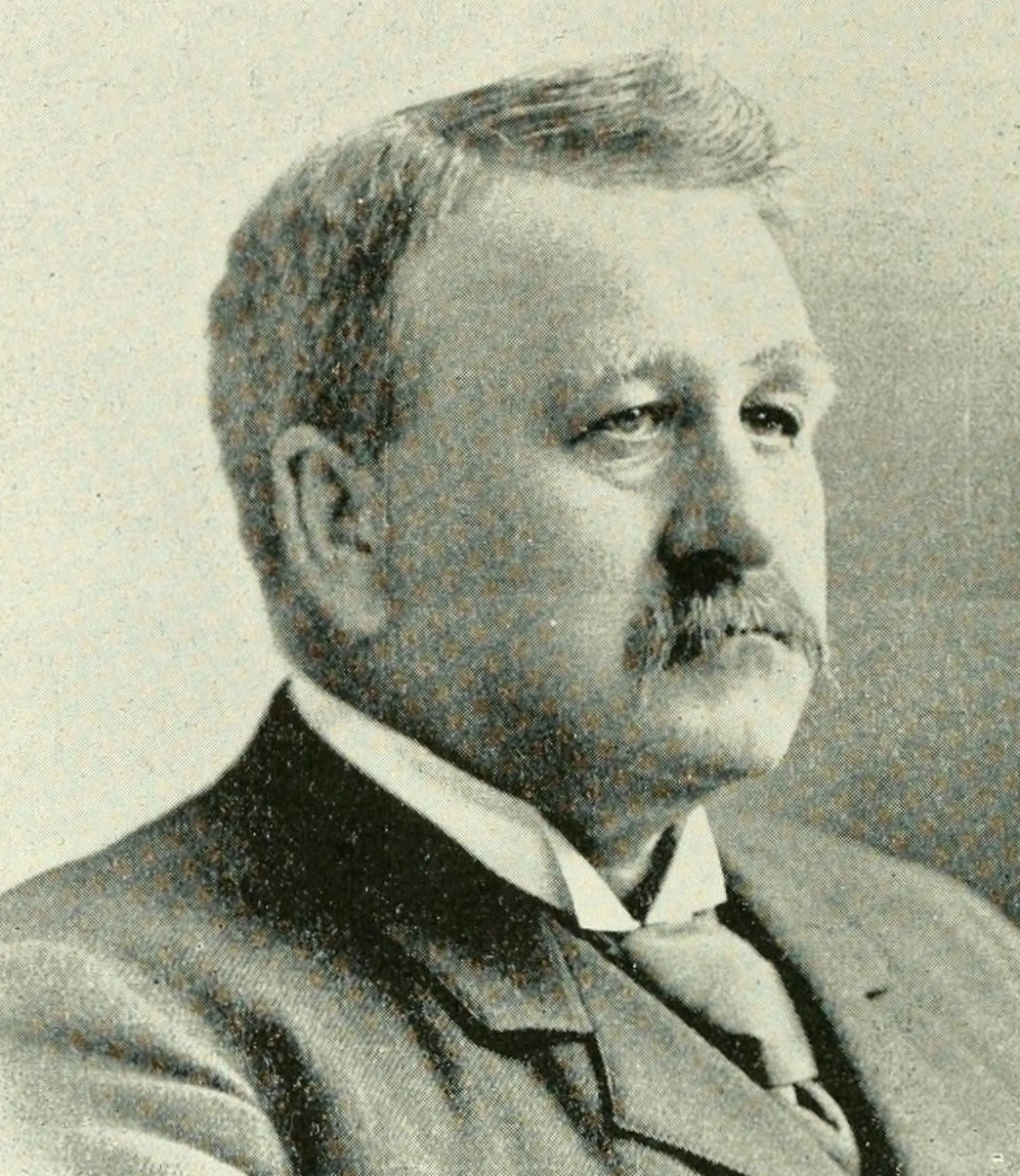

Member of the U.S. House of Representatives from Connecticut's 2nd district
- In office March 4, 1887 – March 3, 1889
- Preceded by: Charles L. Mitchell
- Succeeded by: Washington F. Willcox

Personal details
- Born: August 6, 1835 Seymour, Connecticut, U.S.
- Died: April 14, 1903 (aged 67) Seymour, Connecticut, U.S
- Party: Democratic
- Other political affiliations: Fair Haven Union Cemetery

Carlos French (August 6, 1835 – April 14, 1903) was an American businessman and politician who served one term as a United States representative from Connecticut from 1887 to 1889.

== Biography ==
He was born in Humphreysville, Connecticut (now known as Seymour, Connecticut). He was the son of Raymond French and Olive Curtis French.

French attended the common schools of Seymour and General Russell’s Military School, New Haven, Connecticut. He engaged in manufacturing and is credited with inventing the spiral steel car spring and the corrugated volute spring.

=== Early political career ===
French was a member of the Connecticut House of Representatives in 1860 and again in 1868.

=== Business career ===
He was employed as the president and treasurer of the Fowler Nail Company from 1869 until his death and also the vice president of the H.A. Matthews Manufacturing Company. He was also the director the Union Horse Shoe Nail Company of Chicago, Illinois and of the Second National Bank of New Haven, Connecticut. In addition, he was the director of the Colonial Trust Company of Waterbury, Connecticut and of the New York, New Haven & Hartford Railroad Company.

=== Congress ===
French was a member of the Democratic National Committee and was elected as a Democrat to the Fiftieth Congress (March 4, 1887 – March 3, 1889). He was not a candidate for renomination in 1888.

=== Later career and death ===
After leaving Congress, he resumed his former manufacturing pursuits and corporate connections. He died in Seymour, Connecticut in 1903 and was buried in Fair Haven Union Cemetery in New Haven, Connecticut.

U.S. House of Representatives
Preceded by Charles Le Moyne Mitchell	Member of the U.S. House of Representatives from Connecticut's 2nd congressional district 1887–1889	Succeeded by Washington F. Willcox
