= Stephen Kellogg (politician) =

American politician (1822–1904)

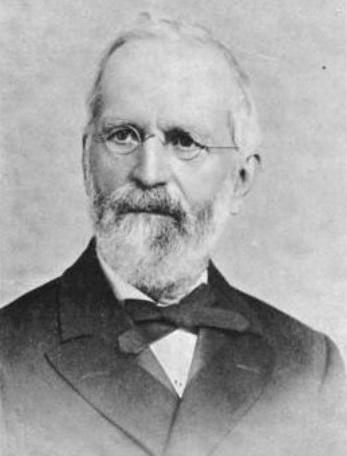

Member of the U.S. House of Representatives from Connecticut's 2nd district
- In office March 4, 1869 – March 3, 1875
- Preceded by: Julius Hotchkiss
- Succeeded by: James Phelps

Personal details
- Born: April 5, 1822 Shelburne, Massachusetts, U.S.
- Died: January 27, 1904 (aged 81) Waterbury, Connecticut, U.S
- Party: Republican
- Education: Yale University

Military service
- Allegiance: United States of America
- Branch/service: Connecticut National Guard
- Years of service: 1863–1870
- Rank: Brigadier general
- Unit: 2nd Regiment

Stephen Wright Kellogg (April 5, 1822 – January 27, 1904) was an American politician, attorney, military officer and judge.

== Early life ==
Kellogg was born on April 5, 1822, in Shelburne, Massachusetts. He worked on his father's farm until he was twenty, in the winter attending or teaching school. In the fall of 1842 he entered Amherst College, but remained there only two terms; then he joined the class of 1846 at Yale College, where he was a member of Skull and Bones and was graduated with highest honors. Among his classmates and fellow Bonesmen was the Hon. Henry Baldwin Harrison, his lifelong friend.

After a few months of school teaching he entered the Yale Law School, and was admitted to the bar in June, 1848.

== Career ==
Kellogg first began to practice law in Naugatuck, Connecticut, where he remained until 1854, and then having been elected judge of probate for the district of Waterbury, he removed to that then small city. He held this office for seven years. In 1854 the legislature appointed him judge of the New Haven County Court. From 1866 to 1869, and 1877 to 1883, he was the City Attorney of Waterbury, Connecticut; and until a short time before his death he was constantly occupied in the practice of his profession.

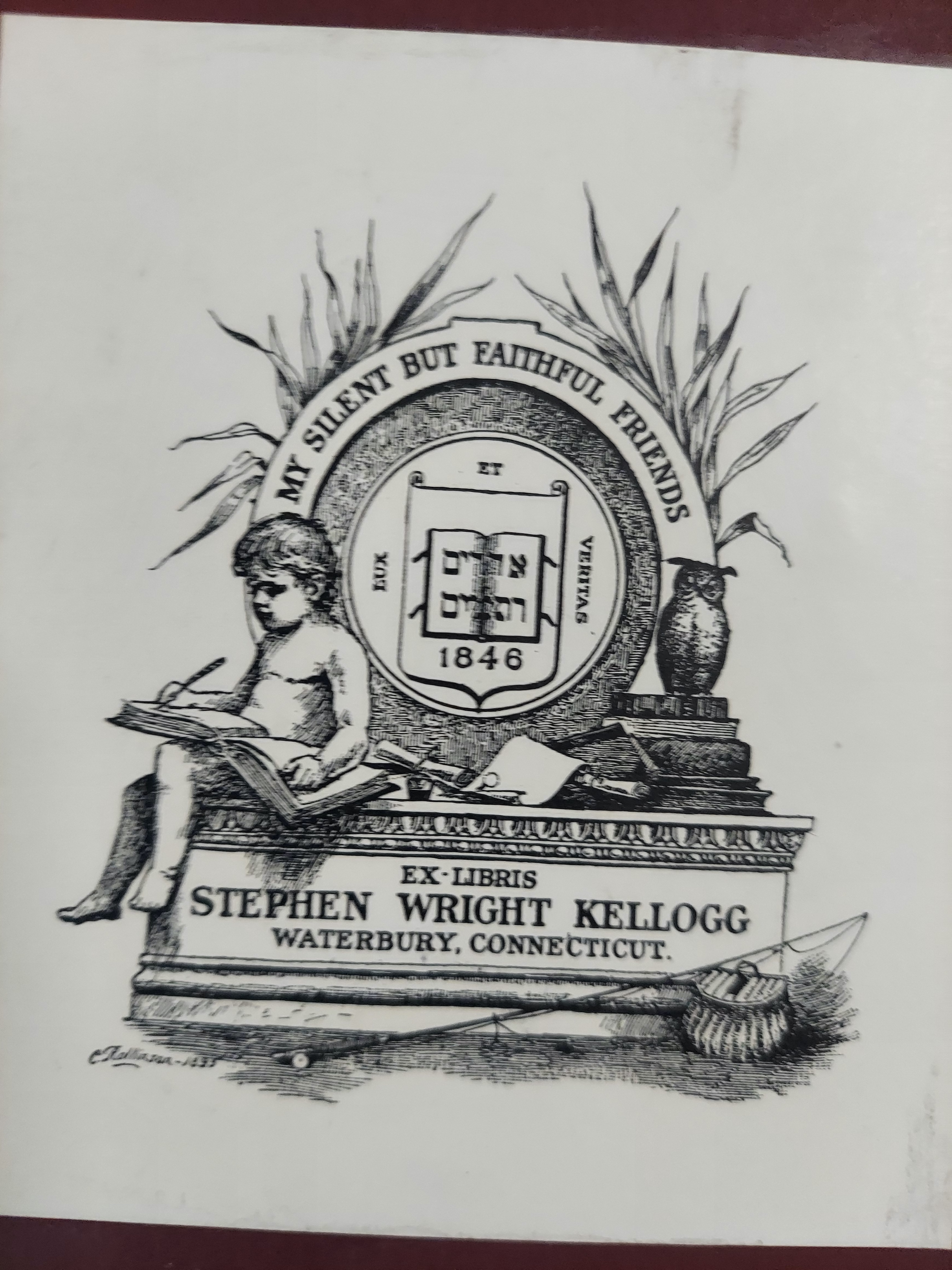

Meantime his active mind and restless energy found congenial occupation in the stirring political events of the times. In 1851 he was clerk of the Connecticut State Senate; in 1853 a senator himself; in 1856 a member of the House; and he was a delegate to the Republican National Conventions of 1860, of 1868, and of 1876. Three times he was elected to US Congress from the usually Democratic second district, and his perseverance and success in protecting and advancing both the public and personal interests of his constituents were remarkable. In 1875, he lost his bid for re-election to James Phelps, but even in this election Kellogg received over 45% of the vote.

=== Military service ===
During the American Civil War, he was Colonel of the Second Regiment, Connecticut National Guard, from 1863 to 1866, and following the War, he was Brigadier-General from 1866 to 1870. He was the author and promoter of legislation organizing the active militia in an efficient body known as the Connecticut National Guard. He never lost interest in public affairs, and to them, until within a few weeks of his death, aged 81, his voice and pen were often devoted.

== Personal life ==
He died on January 27, 1904, in Waterbury and was interred at Riverside Cemetery. His bookplate is in a first edition first state of the 1858 copy of The Courtship of Miles Standish. The assumption is he had a library and was a reader of contemporary books.

== Notes ==
U.S. House of Representatives
Preceded by Julius Hotchkiss	Member of the U.S. House of Representatives from Connecticut's 2nd congressional district 1869–1875	Succeeded by James Phelps
