= Fair Haven Heights, New Haven =

Neighborhood in New Haven, Connecticut

Coordinates: 41.302°N 72.885°W

Fair Haven Heights, or simply the Heights, is a residential and light industrial neighborhood in the eastern part of the city of New Haven, Connecticut, United States, located east of the Quinnipiac River. Fair Haven Heights is not to be confused with the adjacent Fair Haven neighborhood west of the river. The area is bordered on the west by the Quinnipiac River, on the north by Route 80, on the east by the town of East Haven, and on the south by Ferry Street and Warwick Avenue. The main through routes are Quinnipiac Avenue, East Grand Avenue, and Eastern Street

== History ==
It was founded in the 18th century as a fishing and oystering village called Dragon. Dragon was initially located at the point where the present day Ferry Street Bridge crosses the Quinnipiac River. Early Native American settlements existed in the same location. According to some, the name Dragon originated with stories told by suitors of seals (sea dragons) that would sun themselves on this sandy point of land. According to others, it was called Dragon by the early white settlers because the Native American word for those harbor seals sounded like "dragon" to their ear.

From the time of the Quinnipiac (in their language, “long-water-land”) Indians, the oyster was not only an available food source but a major industry of the community, which was to influence the prosperity of the neighborhood during the 19th century.

Dragon in time came to include the eastern side of the river that belonged to East Haven, and came to be known as the Heights (because the bulk of that area is set on a huge, heavily wooded hill). Together both the neighborhood across the River (called Neck at the time) and Dragon became Fair Haven in the 19th century (1824). In 1870 the Neck became part of New Haven. It was not until 1881 that the Heights incorporated with New Haven, after an affiliation with the town of East Haven.

In the nineteenth century, a number of brownstone quarries operated along Russell Street in the Heights. Located in the rocky, wooded area behind the New Haven Friends (Quaker) Meeting House, Quarry Park Preserve contains remnants of the commercial quarrying operations that once existed in the area.

== Today ==
Today, it is a demographically mixed neighborhood. There are luxury condominiums along the Quinnipiac, modest small homes along Grand Avenue, and public housing projects at the summit of the hill. Similarly, the ethnic breakdown of residents includes Italian-Americans, Puerto Ricans, and African-Americans.

There are two large, colonial-era churches on Grand Avenue between Lenox and Quinnipiac. One is shared by an Episcopalian Congregation (St. James Episcopal Church) and an Independent Catholic Parish (St. Joseph of Arimathea Independent Catholic Church), and the other is Congregational. In addition, the New Haven Religious Society of Friends relocated their Quaker Meeting House to Grand Avenue in the 1990s.

Thanks to improving water quality, oystering has returned to the Quinnipiac River since the 1990s.

Fair Haven Heights is in State Senate District 11, State Assembly District 97, and Aldermanic Ward 13. It is currently represented by Senator Martin Looney, Representative Al Paolillo, and Alder Rosa Santana, all Democrats.

== Architecture ==
Originally, the Heights was generally fields and woods. In the 18th and 19th centuries, this area saw the construction of many homes in the Victorian Gothic style. Spacious homes were built by successful businessmen high above the river on East Grand Avenue, Clifton Street, Sherland Avenue, Lenox Street and Quinnipiac Avenue.

James F. Babcock, a lawyer and publisher of the New Haven Palladium newspaper, built a large Victorian Gothic home on 30 acres (120,000 m^{2}) of land between East Grand Avenue and Clifton Street. The present day address is 89 Sherland Avenue. A few years later the house, two barns and a carriage house were sold. The Babcock home was altered and two more homes were built. Arched woodwork decorates the eaves and high gables. On the southern part of what was the Babcock estate at 154 East Grand Avenue can be found the Victorian Gothic home of the Moody family. Lucius Moody was a successful insurance agent. His wife, Dr. Mary Blair Moody, was the first woman physician in the area. Sharp gables, porches and bays, and decorative woodwork complete this example of wooden Victorian Gothic. Two Victorian Gothic cottages remain at 106 and 112 Sherland Avenue.

The Charles Ives home originally was built on Clifton Street on land that is now Fairmont Park. The Ives redstone walls and gates remain. Charles Ives, a lawyer (not to be confused with the composer, Charles Edward Ives), was a member of the Connecticut General Assembly and Speaker of the House in the late 1860s. The Ives’ Victorian Gothic home was designed by Rufus Russell. In the early 1920s the Ives’ property was purchased by the City of New Haven to become Fairmont Park. The Ives’ home was moved across the street, and made into two two-family homes (151-153 and 159-161 Clifton Street). Further down Clifton Street at 80 and 84 stand two Greek Revival homes on high cellars.

The Henry Lancraft house was built on Lenox Street in the Victorian Gothic style. The Lancraft brothers were builders and oystermen in the late 19th century. A redstone wall remains on the property with an entrance at 120 Lexington Avenue.

Coming down the hill to 61 East Grand Avenue one finds the Foote-Chamberlain house. Built in the 1830s in the Italian Villa style it sits above a stone wall topped by an iron fence. In the late 19th century the house was renovated with the addition of a veranda, two ells, a balustraded roof and scalloped shingles.

All along Quinnipiac Avenue one can find homes that were built by families in the oyster business, banking and provisions. The Barnes Victorian Gothic home can be found at 1212 Quinnipiac Avenue. Henry Barnes and his neighbor Horace H. Strong along with Franklin H. Hart were wholesale dealers in meat, seafood and vegetables. At 965 Quinnipiac Avenue stands a home built by Willet Hemingway. Descendants of the family continued to live in the home for years after it was built in the late 1840s. At the turn of the 20th century changes were made in the house that altered it to the Victorian Carpenter Gothic style. In 2002 the now 3 family home was purchased by Doug and Cheri Forbush who continue to occupy and maintain it. The bright pink house, located at the corner of Hemingway Street and Quinnipiac Avenue, serves as a useful landmark while driving or walking through this historic neighborhood.

== Notable sites ==
- Benjamin Jepson Magnet School
- Grand Avenue Bridge
- Quinnipiac Middle School

== List of streets ==
- 1st Avenue
- Aner Street
- Carroll Street

• Clifton Street

- East Grand Avenue
- Eastern Circle
- Eastern Street
- Eldridge Street
- Essex Street
- Fairmont Avenue
- Foxon Boulevard/Foxon Road
- Foxon Street
- Grand Avenue
- Hemmingway Street
- Highview Lane
- Howard Street
- Hulse Street
- Judith Terence
- Kingswood Drive
- Leila Street
- Lenox Street
- Lexington Avenue/Lexington Terence
- Marie Street
- Mountain Top Lane
- Oxford Street
- Pequot Street
- Pine Street
- Quinnipiac Avenue
- Revere Court/Revere Street
- Rock Hill Road
- Rosewood Avenue
- Runo Terence
- Russell Street
- Russo Avenue
- Sherland Avenue
- Skyview Lane
- Summit Street
- Welcome Street
- Woodhill Road
