= Erector Set =

Brand of metal toy construction set

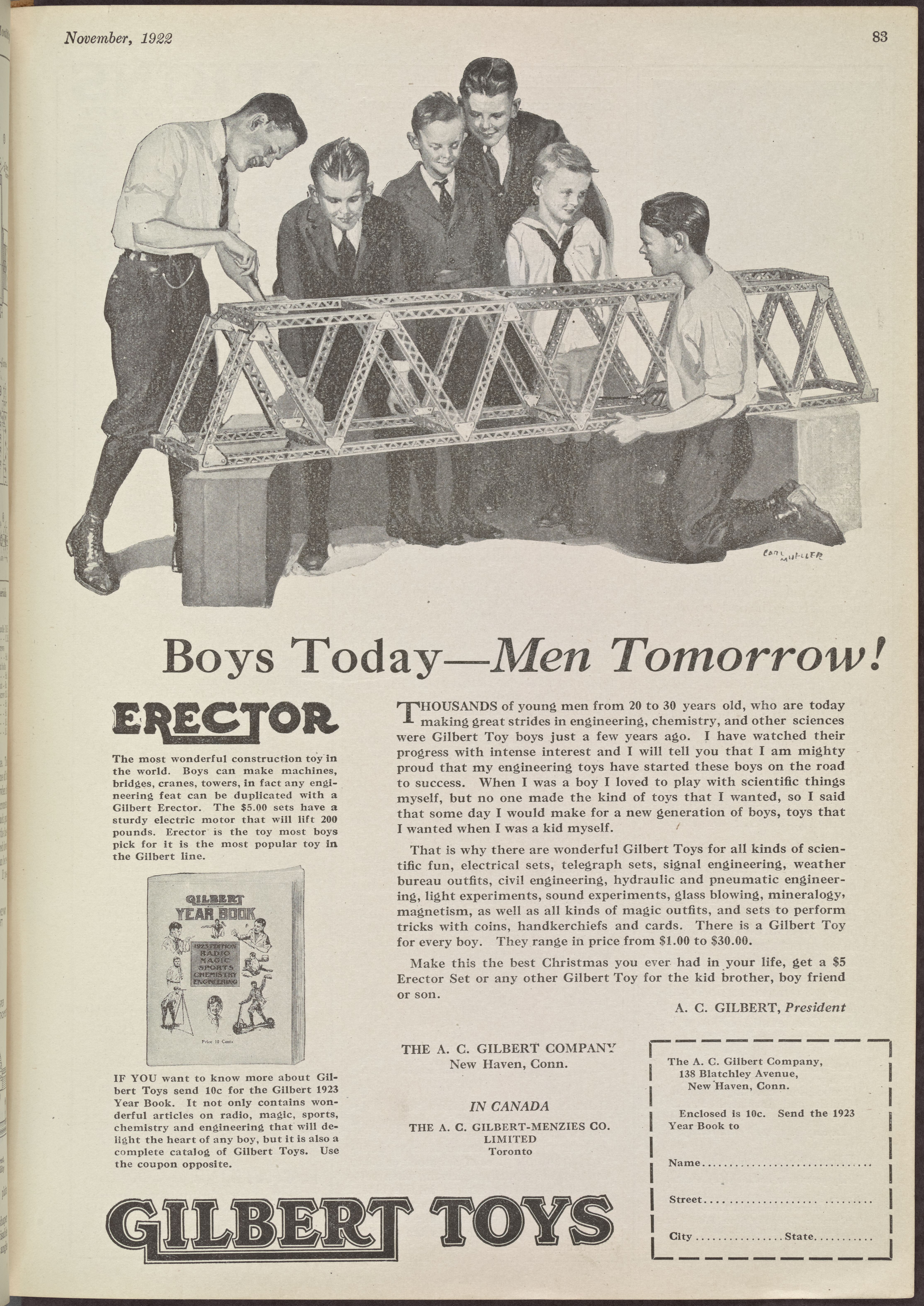
Print advertisement for Erector Set, circa 1922

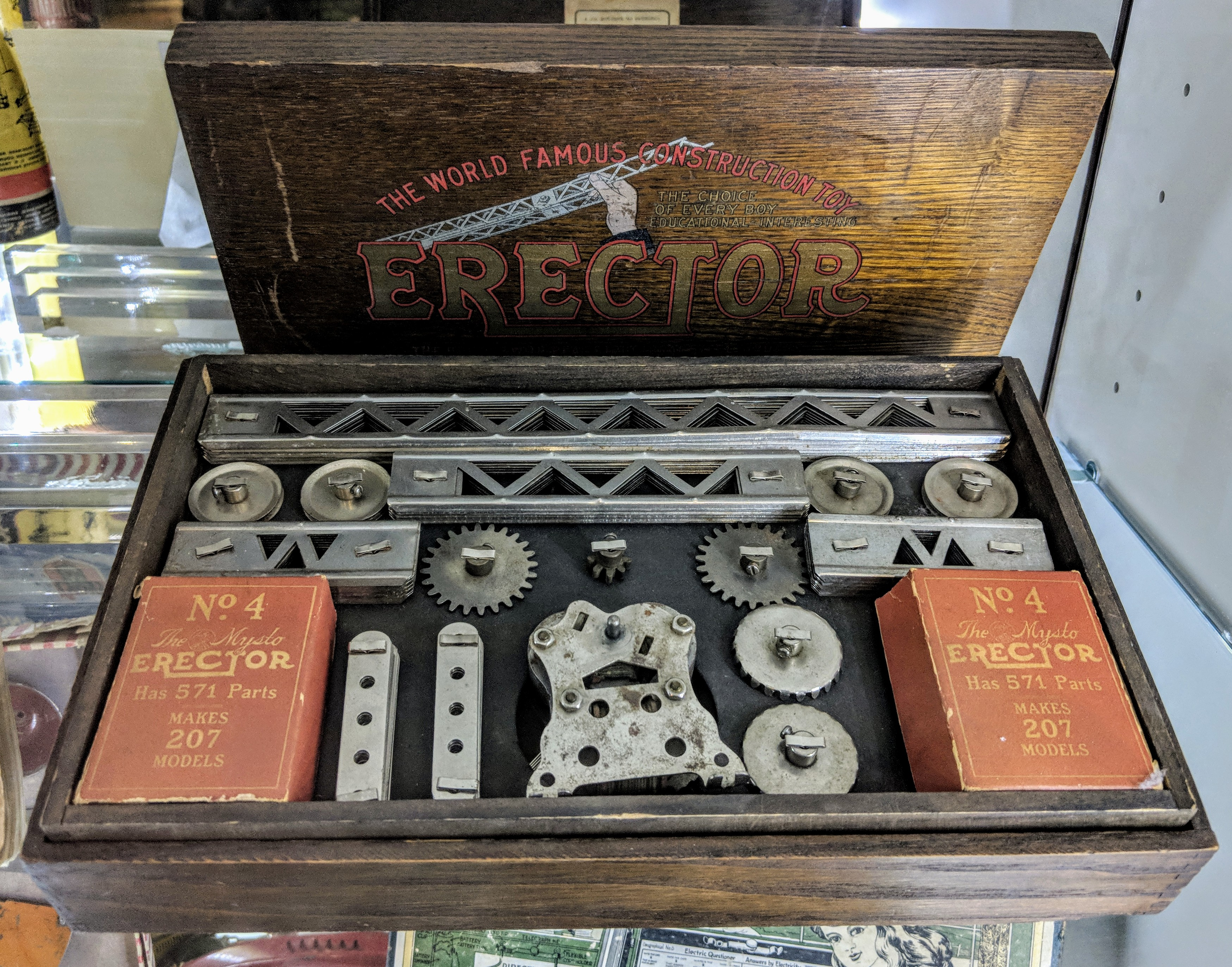
An early Erector set

Erector Set (trademark styled as "ERECTOR") was a brand of metal toy construction sets which were patented by Alfred Carlton Gilbert and first sold by his company, the Mysto Manufacturing Company of New Haven, Connecticut, in 1913. In 1916, the company was reorganized as the A. C. Gilbert Company. The brand continued its independent existence under various corporate ownerships until 1990, when Meccano bought the Erector brand and consolidated its worldwide marketing with its own brand. Erector coverage focuses on the historical legacy of the classic Erector Set; for later developments under the "Erector by Meccano" brand, see the Meccano article.

Basic Erector parts included thin metal beams with regularly spaced holes for assembly using nuts and bolts. A frequently promoted patented feature was the ability to fabricate a strong but lightweight hollow structural girder from four long flat pieces of stamped sheet steel, held together by bolts and nuts per U.S. patent 1,066,809. Flat or curved pieces of sheet metal in various shapes and colors could be added to the structural skeleton. Hardened steel rods and screw clamps allowed the construction of hinges and the transmission of mechanical power via rotating parts such as pulleys, gears, wheels, and levers.

Unlike some earlier wooden construction sets, Erector could be used both for static structures and for dynamic structures incorporating mechanical linkages and other moving components. Modular, standardized construction sets like Erector provided the ability to build a model, then take it apart and build something else, over and over again. Both AC-powered electric motors and battery-powered DC motors became available, usually equipped with gears to increase their torque and effective mechanical power. Later sets added miniature light bulbs and simple switches to control electrical power.

Erector is a versatile constructional medium. In addition to building models, it is used to prototype new ideas and designs.

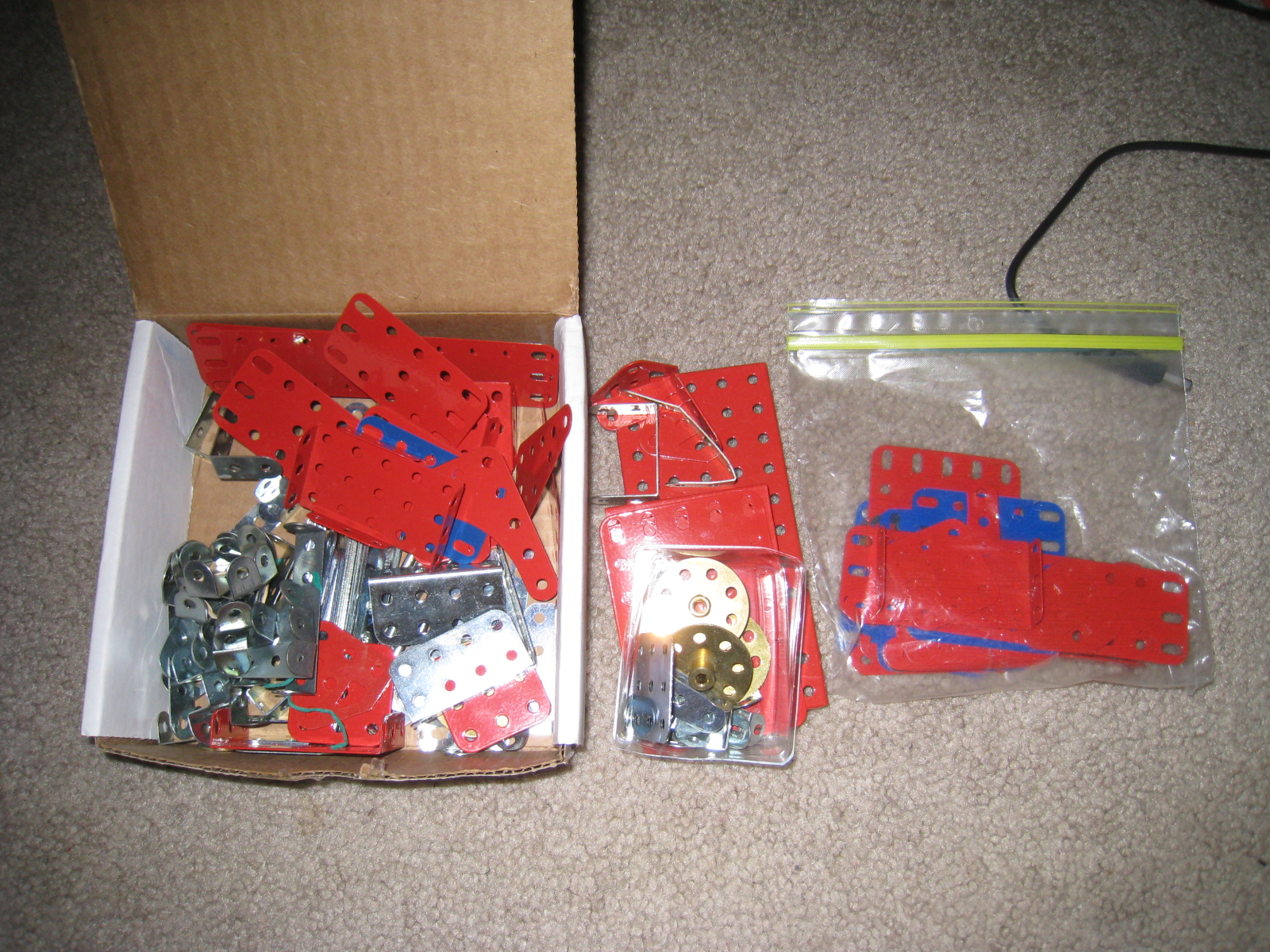
Some components of a modern Erector Set

== History ==
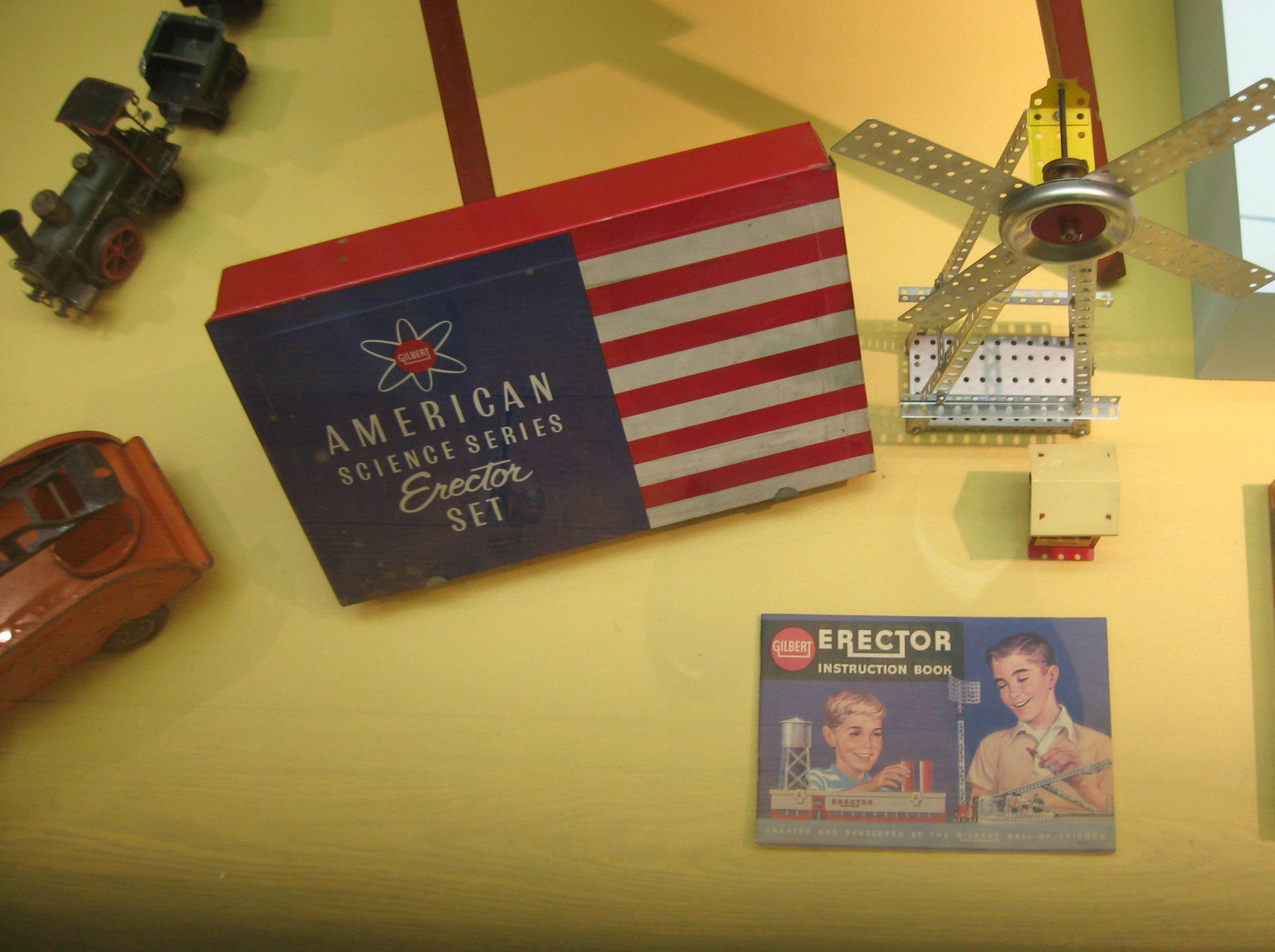
Exhibit in the Museum of the City of New York

Erector was first envisioned by Alfred Carlton Gilbert (A.C. Gilbert) in 1911, as he rode the train from New Haven to New York City. This section of track was being converted to electrical power, and Gilbert watched as steel girders were erected to carry the power lines, inspiring him to develop the toy. Gilbert was a skilled magician and manufactured magic tricks and magic sets with his existing company the "Mysto Manufacturing Company". The first Erector set was made there in 1913, called "The Erector / Structural Steel and Electro-Mechanical Builder", and labeled as "Educational, Instructive and Amusing". The toy was first introduced and sold to the public in 1913 at the Toy Fair held at the Broadway Central Hotel in New York City.

Erector quickly became the most popular construction toy in the United States, most likely because it was the only construction set at the time to contain a motor. In 1914, the name was changed to "The Mysto Erector, The Toy That Resembles Structural Steel". In 1916, the company was reorganized and became the A.C. Gilbert Company. The product was renamed "Gilbert Erector, The Toy Like Structural Steel". In 1924, more changes occurred, as the entire Erector system was completely overhauled to include over 70 types of parts. Erector was now called "The New Erector, The World's Greatest Toy".

Through 1932, Erector was sold in wooden boxes, but 1933 through 1962 the sets would be sold in colorful boxes made of painted steel. Early boxes were colored red, green, or blue; by the 1950s all set boxes were painted red. As the company grew, the area around the Gilbert factory became known as "Erector Square".

A.C. Gilbert died in 1961, and the company went into decline, filing for bankruptcy in 1967. The product was redesigned, adding many plastic parts, but the "clunky" looking models failed to compete with the new, more-realistic scale plastic models coming onto the market. The Gabriel company of Lancaster, Pennsylvania, bought the Erector brand name and continued to market the recently redesigned system, though by the mid-1970s most plastic parts had been removed (or replaced by laminated fiberboard, for panels) as a savings measure due to the oil crisis. Sales were slow, and by the 1980s the trademark Erector was acquired by Ideal Toys and then Tyco Toys. In 1990, Meccano bought the Erector brand. The two brands are now sold under the Meccano brand name, with the Erector Set being marketed as "Erector by Meccano", having the same parts as Meccano.

In 2002, a movie based on A.C. Gilbert's life called The Man Who Saved Christmas was made for television. It focused on Gilbert's successful appeal to the Council of National Defense to reject a proposal to ban toy production in favor of wartime related materials during World War I.

An extensive collection of A.C. Gilbert Company scientific and educational children's toys is housed at the Eli Whitney Museum in Hamden, Connecticut.

== Applications ==
Over the years, Erector Sets have been used to prototype a variety of devices, including:

- In 1949, an Erector set was used to build the precursor to the modern artificial heart by William Sewell and Dr. William Glenn of the Yale School of Medicine. The external pump successfully bypassed the heart of a dog for more than an hour.
- In the 1970s, information theory pioneer Claude Shannon constructed a bounce-juggling machine from an Erector set.
- In the late 1980s, with an Erector Set, various old toys, and bits of jewelry, Jack Kevorkian jerry-rigged a machine he called the Thanatron (later renamed to the Mercitron). Three bottles were suspended from a rickety beam, one filled with a saline solution to open a patient's veins, another with barbiturates for sedation, and a third with potassium chloride to stop the heart. After Kevorkian connected the patient to an IV, he or she would pull a chain on the device to start the lethal medications flowing. He called it his "Rube Goldberg suicide device."
- In the late 1990s, engineer Mark Sumner used Erector to create a working model for "Soarin'", an attraction at Disney's California Adventure in Anaheim, California, and Walt Disney World's Epcot near Orlando, Florida.

In 1990, Meccano S.A. built a giant Ferris wheel in France. It was modelled after the original 1893 Ferris Wheel built by George Washington Gale Ferris Jr. at the World's Columbian Exposition at Chicago and was shipped to the United States to promote "Erector by Meccano" after Meccano S.A. had bought out the Erector brand name and began selling Erector by Meccano sets in the U.S. It went on display in New York City, after which it was purchased by Ripley's Believe It or Not! and put on display in their St. Augustine, Florida museum. The model, the largest in size at the time, is 6.5 metres (21 ft) high, weighs 544 kilograms (1,199 lb), was made from 19,507 pieces, 50,560 nuts and bolts, and took 1,239 hours to construct. At this mass and size, some deviation from Erector by Meccano-only parts was a necessity, to prevent it collapsing (mainly in the structural spokes). The largest model by mass would certainly be in contention, but some models have topped 600 kilograms (1,300 lb).

== See also ==
- Anchor Stone Blocks
- Chris Burden, artist who has used Erector and Meccano components to build large structures
- Construx
- Girder and Panel building sets
- K'Nex
- Meccano
- Merkur sets
- Steel Tec
- Steel erector (profession)
- Tinkertoy
- Spin Master
