= Leora Levy =

Cuban-American businesswoman (born 1957)

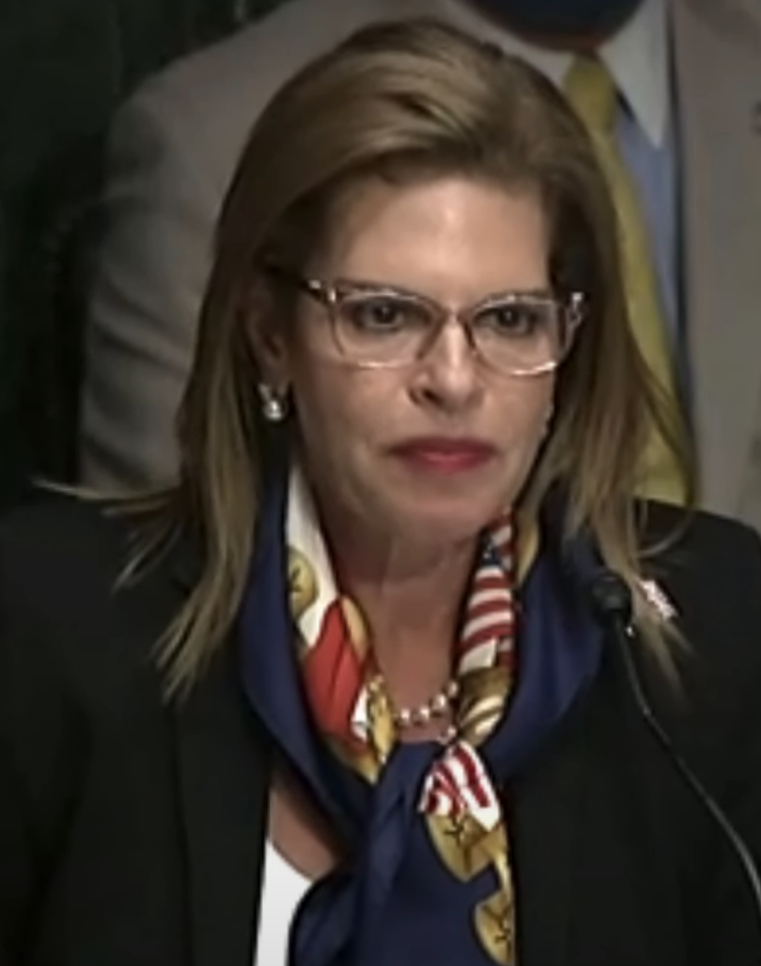

Republican National Committeewoman from Connecticut
- In office 2016–2024
- Succeeded by: Annalisa Stravato

Personal details
- Born: Leora Mariana Rosenberg; March 31, 1957 (age 69) Havana, Cuba
- Spouse: Steven Levy (m. 1985)
- Children: 3
- Education: Brown University (BA)

Leora Mariana Levy (née Rosenberg; born March 31, 1957) is a Cuban-born American businesswoman and politician. She was the Republican nominee in the 2022 United States Senate election in Connecticut.

== Early life and education ==
Levy was born in Cuba in 1957. Her mother and grandparents fled Lithuania in 1940. Her family migrated to the United States in 1960 to escape Fidel Castro's regime. She earned a Bachelor of Arts from Brown University in International Relations. Levy is Jewish and is fluent in Spanish.

== Career ==
Levy was one of the first female commodity traders to work as a sugar trader and an assistant vice president at Ambrit Sugars, as well as a traffic executive and trader for international sugar, steel and copper concentrates at Phibro-Salomon, Inc.

Levy also serves on the Board of Directors of SoldierStrong, a non-profit organization based in Connecticut.

== Politics ==
Levy was finance chairman of the Connecticut Republican Party from 2013 to 2015. She served as the finance chair for Republican Bob Stefanowski during his unsuccessful bid for Governor of Connecticut in 2018. She is a representative to the Republican National Committee for Connecticut. In 2019, Levy was named the winner of the Prescott Bush Award, the highest honor of the Connecticut Republican Party.

In the 2016 Republican primary, she supported Florida Governor Jeb Bush. She criticized Donald Trump, saying at the time that he was "vulgar, ill-mannered and disparages those whom he cannot intimidate". She later applauded Trump's leadership.

In February 2022, she voted for a package of RNC resolutions that included a censure of Reps. Liz Cheney and Adam Kinzinger.

=== Ambassadorship nomination ===
On September 26, 2019, President Trump announced his intent to nominate Levy to be the next United States Ambassador to Chile. On October 25, 2019, her nomination was sent to the Senate. On January 3, 2020, her nomination was returned to the President under Rule XXXI, Paragraph 6 of the United States Senate. On May 4, 2020, her renomination was sent to the Senate. On January 3, 2021, her nomination was returned to the President under the same Rule XXXI, Paragraph 6 of the United States Senate.

=== Candidacy for U.S. Senate ===
In February 2022, Levy announced her candidacy for U.S. Senate to represent Connecticut, to run against incumbent Democratic U.S. Senator Richard Blumenthal. The primary had been described as being between the moderate and conservative wings of the Republican party, with Levy being the conservative candidate against the more moderate former state House Minority Leader Themis Klarides. Abortion was a key issue within the primary, with Klarides supporting abortion rights and Levy supporting the right to life.

On August 4, 2022, five days before the Republican primary, former President Donald Trump endorsed Levy. On August 9, Levy defeated Klarides and attorney Peter Lumaj in the primary. Many have described her victory as an upset.

In her acceptance speech, Levy reminded supporters of her opposition to job-related vaccine requirements, abortion, and transgender rights.

On November 8, 2022, Blumenthal, with 57.5% of votes cast, convincingly defeated Levy to win a third term in the Senate.

== Personal life ==
On June 2, 1985, Rosenberg married Stephen Levy, in Rye, New York. They have three sons and seven dogs. Levy resides in Greenwich, Connecticut.

Party political offices
Preceded by Dan E. Carter	Republican nominee for U.S. Senator from Connecticut (Class 3); 2022	Most recent
