= 2022 United States Senate election in Connecticut =

- November 8, 2022
- Turnout: 51.03% ▼
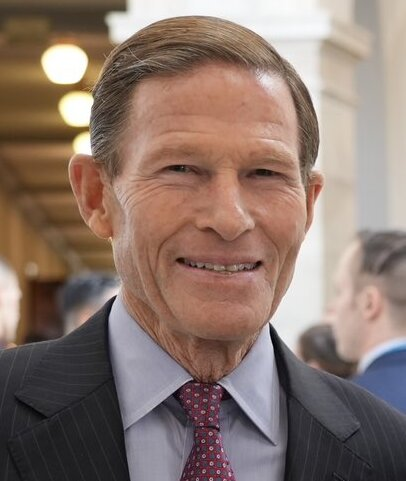

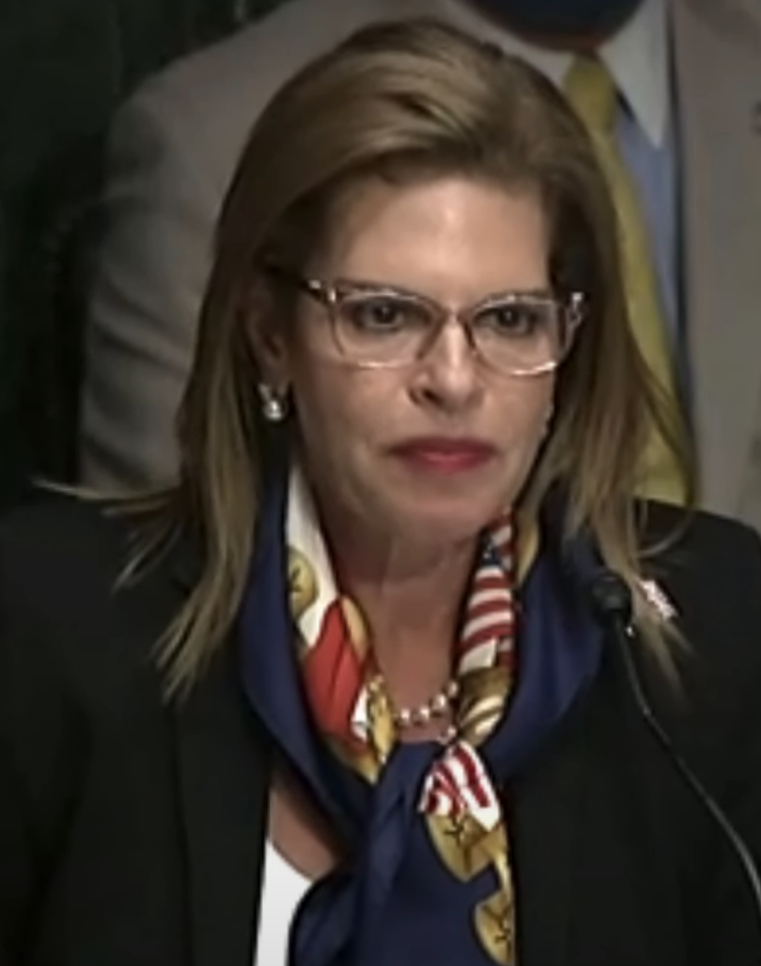
Nominee	Richard Blumenthal	Leora Levy
Party	Democratic	Republican
Alliance	Working Families
Popular vote	723,864	535,943
Percentage	57.45%	42.54%
- Blumenthal: 50–60% 60–70% 70–80% 80–90% >90% Levy: 50–60% 60–70% Tie: 50%
U.S. senator before election
Richard Blumenthal
Democratic
Elected U.S. senator
Richard Blumenthal
Democratic

The 2022 United States Senate election in Connecticut was held on November 8, 2022, to elect a member of the United States Senate to represent the State of Connecticut.

Democrat Richard Blumenthal was first elected to this seat in 2010 with 55.2% of the vote over Republican Linda McMahon. He was re-elected in 2016 with 63.2% of the vote over Republican Dan Carter. Blumenthal ran for reelection to a third term in office and secured the 2022 nomination. Businesswoman Leora Levy won the Republican primary on August 9, 2022. Blumenthal won reelection, defeating Levy by about 15 points. The race took place simultaneously with the 2022 Connecticut gubernatorial election. This was the first election in Blumenthal's senatorial career where he did not carry Windham County. It was also the first time Windham voted Republican in a Connecticut Senate election since 1988 and the first time Windham had done so in Connecticut's Class 3 Senate seat since 1962.

== Democratic convention ==
=== Candidates ===
==== Nominated at convention ====
- Richard Blumenthal, incumbent U.S. senator

=== Endorsements ===
Richard Blumenthal

Organizations

- Feminist Majority PAC
- Jewish Dems
- League of Conservation Voters
- NARAL Pro-Choice America
- Natural Resources Defense Council
- Population Connection Action Fund
- Pro-Israel America
- Sierra Club

Labor unions

- Connecticut AFL–CIO

== Republican primary ==
=== Candidates ===
==== Nominee ====
- Leora Levy, businesswoman, Republican National Committee member, and former nominee for U.S. ambassador to Chile

==== Eliminated in primary ====
- Themis Klarides, former minority leader of the Connecticut House of Representatives
- Peter Lumaj, attorney and perennial candidate

==== Eliminated at convention ====
- Nicholas Connors
- John Flynn, candidate for the Connecticut House of Representatives in 2018 and 2020
- Robert F. Hyde, lobbyist and U.S. Marine Corps veteran

==== Declined ====
- Dan Carter, former state representative and nominee for U.S. Senate in 2016
- Bob Stefanowski, businessman and nominee for governor in 2018 (ran for governor)
- Joe Visconti, former West Hartford town councilor and nominee for Connecticut's 1st congressional district in 2008

=== Endorsements ===
Themis Klarides

Governors

- Charlie Baker, 72nd governor of Massachusetts (2015–2023)
- Chris Christie, 55th governor of New Jersey (2010–2018)
- Larry Hogan, 62nd governor of Maryland (2015–2023)

Local officials

- Erin Stewart, mayor of New Britain (2013–2025)

Organizations

- Connecticut Republican Party
Leora Levy

Executive branch officials

- John Bolton, U.S. national security advisor (2018–2019), United States ambassador to the United Nations (2005–2006)
- Donald Trump, 45th president of the United States (2017–2021)

U.S. senators

- Marsha Blackburn, U.S. senator from Tennessee (2019–Present)
- Tom Cotton, U.S. senator from Arkansas (2015–Present)
- Rob Portman, U.S. senator from Ohio (2011–2023)
- Thom Tillis, U.S. senator from North Carolina (2015–Present)

U.S. representatives

- Guy Reschenthaler, U.S. representative from Pennsylvania (2019–Present)
- Cathy McMorris Rodgers, U.S. representative from Washington (2005–2025)
- María Elvira Salazar, U.S. representative from Florida (2021–Present)
- Mike Turner, U.S. representative from Ohio (2003–Present)

Individuals

- Richard Grenell, former diplomat and former director of National Intelligence
- Linda McMahon, former administrator of the Small Business Administration

Organizations

- FreedomWorks
- Susan B. Anthony Pro-Life America
- VIEWPAC

=== Results ===
Results by county Levy: 40–50%; 50–60%; Klarides: 40–50%

Results by municipality Levy: 30–40%; 40–50%; 50–60%; 60–70%; Klarides: 40–50%; 50–60%; 60–70%

Republican primary results
Party	Candidate	Votes	%
Republican	Leora Levy	46,774	50.60%
Republican	Themis Klarides	37,003	40.03%
Republican	Peter Lumaj	8,665	9.37%
Total votes		92,442	100.0%

== General election ==
=== Predictions ===
Source	Ranking	As of
The Cook Political Report	Solid D	March 4, 2022
Inside Elections	Solid D	April 1, 2022
Sabato's Crystal Ball	Safe D	March 1, 2022
Politico	Likely D	August 12, 2022
RCP	Lean D	October 15, 2022
Fox News	Likely D	September 20, 2022
DDHQ	Solid D	July 20, 2022
538	Solid D	June 30, 2022
The Economist	Safe D	September 7, 2022

=== Post-primary endorsements ===
Richard Blumenthal (D)

Organizations

- Democratic Party of Connecticut
- National Education Association
Leora Levy (R)

Executive branch officials

- Nikki Haley, United States ambassador to the United Nations (2017–2018)
- Mike Pompeo, United States secretary of state (2018–2021)

U.S. representatives

- Elise Stefanik, U.S. representative from New York's 21st congressional district (2015–present)

Newspapers

- Republican-American

=== Polling ===
Aggregate polls

Source of poll aggregation	Dates administered	Dates updated	Richard Blumenthal (D)	Leora Levy (R)	Other (Note: Calculated by taking the difference of 100% and all other candidates combined.)	Margin
Real Clear Politics	October 10–23, 2022	October 30, 2022	52.7%	41.7%	5.6%	Blumenthal +11.0
FiveThirtyEight	September 15 – October 19, 2022	October 30, 2022	53.4%	40.9%	5.7%	Blumenthal +12.4
270towin	September 7–21, 2022	October 30, 2022	52.7%	41.7%	5.6%	Blumenthal +11.0
Average			52.9%	41.4%	5.7%	Blumenthal +11.5

Graphical summary

Poll source	Date(s) administered	Sample size (Note: Key: A – all adults RV – registered voters LV – likely voters V – unclear)	Margin of error	Richard Blumenthal (D)	Leora Levy (R)	Other	Undecided
Long Island University	October 24–26, 2022	1,004 (A)	± 3.0%	51%	26%	9% (Note: "Not planning to vote" with 5%; "Another candidate" with 4%)	14%
Quinnipiac University	October 19–23, 2022	1,879 (LV)	± 2.3%	56%	41%	1% (Note: "Refused" with 1%)	2%
Emerson College	October 19–21, 2022	1,000 (LV)	± 3.0%	53%	40%	2% (Note: "Someone else" with 2%)	5%
Emerson College	October 19–21, 2022	1,000 (LV)	± 3.0%	54%	42%	4% (Note: "Someone else" with 4%)	–
Fabrizo, Lee & Associates (R) (Note: This poll was sponsored by The Connecticut Examiner.)	October 10–13, 2022	1,200 (LV)	± 2.8%	49%	44%	–	7%
Western New England University	September 15–21, 2022	766 (RV)	± 3.2%	51%	37%	2% (Note: "Refused" with 2%)	10%
Western New England University	September 15–21, 2022	626 (LV)	± 4.8%	53%	40%	2% (Note: "Refused" with 2%)	5%
Quinnipiac University	September 15–19, 2022	1,911 (LV)	± 2.2%	57%	40%	1% (Note: "Refused" with 1%)	3%
Emerson College	September 7–9, 2022	1,000 (LV)	± 3.0%	49%	36%	–	15%
McLaughlin & Associates (R)	July 26–27, 2022	500 (LV)	± 4.4%	45%	33%	–	22%
Emerson College	May 10–11, 2022	1,000 (RV)	± 3.0%	52%	36%	–	11%

Hypothetical polling

Richard Blumenthal vs. Themis Klarides

Poll source	Date(s) administered	Sample size	Margin of error	Richard Blumenthal (D)	Themis Klarides (R)	Undecided
McLaughlin & Associates (R)	July 26–27, 2022	500 (LV)	± 4.4%	45%	34%	21%
Emerson College	May 10–11, 2022	1,000 (RV)	± 3.0%	50%	40%	10%

Richard Blumenthal vs. Peter Lumaj

Poll source	Date(s) administered	Sample size	Margin of error	Richard Blumenthal (D)	Peter Lumaj (R)	Undecided
Emerson College	May 10–11, 2022	1,000 (RV)	± 3.0%	51%	35%	14%

Richard Blumenthal vs. generic opponent

Poll source	Date(s) administered	Sample size	Margin of error	Richard Blumenthal (D)	Generic Opponent	Undecided
McLaughlin & Associates (R)	July 26–27, 2022	500 (LV)	± 4.4%	41%	47%	12%

Generic Democrat vs. generic Republican

Poll source	Date(s) administered	Sample size	Margin of error	Generic Democrat	Generic Republican	Other	Undecided
Fabrizo Lee (R)	October 10–13, 2022	1,200 (LV)	–	45%	43%	1% (Note: "Refused" with 1%)	11%

=== Debates ===
2022 United States Senate general election in Connecticut debates
No.	Date	Host	Moderator	Link	Democratic	Republican
Key: P Participant A Absent N Non-invitee I Invitee W Withdrawn						
Key: P Participant A Absent N Non-invitee I Invitee W Withdrawn					Richard Blumenthal	Leora Levy
1	Nov. 2, 2022	Channel 3, CT Insider			P	P

=== Results ===
2022 United States Senate election in Connecticut
Party	Candidate	Votes	%	±%
Democratic	Richard Blumenthal	701,175	55.65%	−2.03%
Working Families	Richard Blumenthal	22,689	1.80%	−3.71%
Total	Richard Blumenthal (incumbent)	723,864	57.45%	-5.74%
Republican	Leora Levy	535,943	42.54%	+7.92%
Write-in		80	0.00%	±0.0%
Total votes		1,259,887	100.00%	
Democratic hold				

==== By county ====
County	Richard Blumenthal Democratic		Leora Levy Republican		Various candidates Other parties		Total votes cast	
County	Fairfield	186,698	59.56%	126,757	40.44%	7	0.00%	313,462
Hartford	189,512	61.36%	119,280	38.62%	42	0.01%	308,834	
Litchfield	37,345	46.02%	43,788	53.96%	9	0.01%	81,142	
Middlesex	41,911	56.37%	32,430	43.62%	5	0.01%	74,346	
New Haven	161,063	56.74%	122,770	43.25%	6	0.00%	282,839	
New London	56,711	56.97%	42,835	43.03%	6	0.01%	99,552	
Tolland	32,129	53.49%	27,431	46.05%	3	0.01%	59,560	
Windham	18,495	47.24%	20,652	52.75%	2	0.01%	39,149	
Total	723,864	57.45%	535,943	42.54%	80	0.01%	1,259,887	

Counties that flipped from Democratic to Republican

- Litchfield (largest city: Torrington)
- Windham (largest town: Windham)

==== By congressional district ====
Blumenthal won all five congressional districts.

District	Blumenthal	Levy	Representative
1st	63%	37%	John B. Larson
2nd	55%	45%	Joe Courtney
3rd	58%	42%	Rosa DeLauro
4th	61%	39%	Jim Himes
5th	52%	48%	Jahana Hayes

== See also ==
- 2022 United States Senate elections
- List of United States senators from Connecticut

== Notes ==
Partisan clients
