= John Orman =

American academic and politician

- Born: January 3, 1949; Brazil, Indiana, US
- Died: July 5, 2009 (aged 60); Fairfield, Connecticut, US

John Michael Orman (January 3, 1949 – July 5, 2009) was a politics professor at Fairfield University in Fairfield, Connecticut. He was the 1984 Democratic Party nominee for the U.S. Congress seat in Connecticut's fourth district, and briefly challenged Senator Joseph Lieberman for the 2006 Democratic Senate nomination. As of 2007, Orman was one of two people claiming to be the current chairman of the Connecticut for Lieberman Party. He was born in Brazil, Indiana.

== 1984 Congressional race ==
Orman was the Democratic candidate for U.S. Representative from the Fourth Congressional District in 1984 against the popular incumbent Republican Stewart McKinney. He said he saw it as an opportunity to discuss national issues and represent a progressive constituency. After losing the election, he welcomed Rep. McKinney to his classroom to meet with his students.

== 2006 Senate campaign ==
In March 2005, Orman announced that he would challenge Lieberman for the Democratic nomination, saying Lieberman was disloyal to the Democratic party and supported the foreign policy of President George W. Bush.

Orman's campaign generated support from bloggers across the country, but for a variety of reasons, he was never considered a serious threat to Lieberman. In September 2005, he announced he was withdrawing from the race because of a lack of money.

The end of Orman's campaign was followed by the campaign of businessman Ned Lamont. When Lamont came to Fairfield University in the spring of 2006, he told those in attendance that he was "picking up where John Orman left off." Lamont went on to upset Lieberman in the Democratic primary in August, winning the party's nomination for the Senate seat with 52% of the vote, but lost the general election to Lieberman, who ran on the Connecticut for Lieberman party line.

== Connecticut for Lieberman Chairmanship ==
On November 15, 2006, Orman changed his party registration from "Democratic" to "Connecticut for Lieberman" and submitted "party rules" to the office of the Secretary of the State. Some of the new rules Orman adopted for the Connecticut for Lieberman party included:

1.If you run under Connecticut for Lieberman, you must actually join our party.
2. The party will nominate people for office who have the last name of Lieberman and/or who are critics and opponents of Senator Lieberman.
3. If any CFL candidate loses our party's nomination in a primary, that candidate must bolt our party, form a new party and work to defeat our party's endorsed candidate.
4. We in the CFL intend to run the same candidate for three different jobs at the same time, ie. House, Senate and Governor.

On January 3, 2007, Connecticut Secretary of State Susan Bysiewicz accepted a filing from Orman. Ted Bromely, a state elections attorney who worked for her office, said "If someone wanted to challenge it, they'd have to go to court."

On June 12, 2007, Orman called for Lieberman to resign from the Senate, describing the senator's rhetoric regarding military action against Iran as "unilateral warmongering" that could lead to "World War III". Orman called for Connecticut Governor M. Jodi Rell to appoint Susan Henshaw as Lieberman's replacement.

== Other activities ==
A member of the Fairfield University faculty from 1978 until his death, Dr. Orman was a former Teacher of the Year and was serving as chair of the Department of Politics at the time of his death.

Orman was the author of four books on American politics. One of his books, "Celebrity Politics," gained national attention and was published in 2003 with Brown University Professor Darrell West. He was also the faculty adviser to the Fairfield University men's basketball team, and a frequent participant in stand-up comedy and hip-hop contests. As a member of the Politics Department, he was instrumental in the hiring of several faculty members, including helping to recruit David L. Downie from Columbia University.He was frequently written about in a number of local publications, including The Fairfield Mirror.

Orman wrote Helen Keller Speaks, a dramatic play and reading capturing the social activist views of Helen Keller based on her documented speeches and letters between 1913 and 1919. The play was first performed on March 14, 2009, at the Regina A. Quick Center for the Arts at Fairfield University with actress January LaVoy, one of Orman's former students, playing the role of Helen Keller.

== Personal life ==
On July 5, 2009, Orman died at his home from a heart attack. In the days following his death, thousands of friends and former students commemorated Orman at Fairfield University and in the surrounding area.

== Books ==
- Celebrity Politics (Prentice Hall, 2004)
- Presidential Accountability: New and Recurring Problems (Greenwood Press, 1990)
- Comparing Presidential Behavior: Carter, Reagan, and the Macho Presidential Style (Greenwood Press, 1987)
- John Orman (1985-06-01). Politics of Rock Music. Burnham Inc Pub. ISBN 978-0-8304-1119-1.
- Presidential Secrecy and Deception: Beyond the Power To Persuade (Greenwood Press, 1980)
