= David Stemerman =

American businessman and politician

- Born: David Israel Stemerman; 1968 (age 57–58); Boston, Massachusetts, U.S.
- Education: Yale University (BA); Harvard University (MBA, JD)
- Political party: Republican
- Spouse: Joline Leibowitz (m. 1997)
- Children: 5

David Israel Stemerman (born 1968) is an American businessman and the Chief Executive Officer of CenterBook Partners, a prominent hedge fund with over $1.5 billion in assets. A member of the Republican Party, he was a candidate for Connecticut governor in 2018, but was eliminated in the primary.

== Early life and education ==
Stemerman was born in the suburbs of Boston in 1968, the son of Dr. Michael Stemerman and Judith Ann Linn. His maternal grandfather was the son of a Polish immigrant, wallpaper hanger in Newark, N.J. His paternal grandfather drove a delivery truck. His father was the first college graduate in the family and went on to become a doctor.

Stemerman attended public schools in Newton, Massachusetts. He then attended Yale University, graduating with a Bachelor of Arts degree in history, summa cum laude. He then attended Harvard University, receiving his Master of Business Administration degree with distinction from Harvard Business School, and his Juris Doctor, magna cum laude, from Harvard Law School.

== Career ==
Stemerman's first job was a legal firm. He went on to work in finance and it was at Lone Pine Capital hedge funds that he decided to start on his own business.

On March 5, 2018, Stemerman announced his run for governor of Connecticut as a Republican in the 2018 election. On August 14, he lost the primary, placing third with 18.3% of the vote behind financial executive Bob Stefanowski and Danbury mayor Mark Boughton.

== Personal life ==
Stemerman is married to Joline Leibowitz, with whom he has five children. The couple was originally married on October 25, 1997. They currently live in Greenwich, Connecticut.
