= Connecticut for Lieberman =

Defunct political party in Connecticut

- Chairman: John Mertens (2011–2013)
- General Secretary: John Kilian (2011–2013)
- Founded: July 10, 2006
- Dissolved: January 2013
- Split from: Democratic Party of Connecticut
- Ideology: Centrism; Anti-Lieberman (from 2007); Pro-Lieberman (until 2007)
- Political position: Center
- Colors: Blue; Yellow (customary)
- Seats in the U.S. Senate (2006): 1 / 100 (peak)

Website
- ctforlieberman.blogspot.com

Connecticut for Lieberman was a Connecticut political party created by twenty-five supporters of U.S. Senator Joe Lieberman in 2006. The party was created to enable Lieberman to run for re-election following his defeat in the Democratic Party primary. In the succeeding general election, Lieberman received 49.7% of the vote, defeating Democrat Ned Lamont and Alan Schlesinger of the Republican Party.

== Party origins ==
The party was established on July 10, 2006, and began collecting signatures in case Lieberman did not win the Connecticut Democratic primary. On August 8, 2006, Lieberman lost the Democratic primary to Lamont. The next day, over 7,500 signatures were filed with the Secretary of State's office in support of Lieberman's candidacy. On August 23, the Secretary of State announced that the party had filed enough valid signatures and would appear on the ballot in November.

The party's formation is similar to that of A Connecticut Party, created for Lowell Weicker's 1990 campaign for Governor under their label.

== Post-election dispute ==
After the election, contention developed between two different groups, one supportive of Lieberman and one critical of him, with each faction asserting that it controlled the party. On August 9, 2006, the day following the primary, Lieberman supporter Stuart R. Korchin changed his party registration to Connecticut for Lieberman. "When Mr. Korchin filled out a short form in August at the Cheshire Town Hall changing his party affiliation from Democrat to Connecticut for Lieberman, the information could not be properly entered in the state’s electronic voter database."

On November 15, 2006, John Orman changed his party registration from Democratic to the Connecticut for Lieberman Party, having been told by the Secretary of the State that there were no registered party members. Orman, a professor of politics at Fairfield University, had briefly challenged Lieberman for the Democratic U.S. Senate nomination in 2006.

Party rules were filed with Connecticut Secretary of the State Susan Bysiewicz on December 21, 2006, by Orman. According to Ted Bromely, a state elections attorney who works for her office, then said, "If someone wanted to challenge it, they'd have to go to court."

On January 12, 2007, Korchin filed a different set of party rules with the Secretary of the State, which were also accepted. In response to an inquiry, Korchin received a letter from a lawyer in the Secretary of the State's office on January 17, 2007, stating that the state had "very limited jurisdiction" over intraparty battles, and was not taking a position over just who was in charge.

In Milford in January 2007, at what was billed as an "organizational meeting" of the party, Orman and Korchin appeared, each claiming to be the party chairman. Korchin announced the annual party meeting would be held in August and left, after which the Milford gathering elected Orman as chair, by a 5–1 margin.

On July 10, 2007, Orman wrote to Bysiewicz and Jeffrey Garfield, executive director of the Elections Enforcement Commission. He asked them to have the state attorney general's office investigate the petitioning done by Lieberman in 2006. Orman's contention was that Lieberman had violated state law by knowingly circulating false petitions, in that he had no actual intent to join or form a new party.

The next month, Korchin told the Hartford Advocate that he had held another party meeting on August 9, although he refused to say where it had occurred. Orman said he had not been informed of any such meeting. Korchin responded that Orman had been notified but had "declined to attend in an e-mail."

On March 6, 2008, there was a statewide party caucus organized by the faction that had chosen Orman as party chair. With Orman declining to run for re-election, John Mertens was elected to succeed him.

Lieberman himself was never a member of the party; he was a registered Democrat. The Senate website listed him as an Independent Democrat.

== Party mission ==
The two competing factions have differing views of the party's mission in the wake of the 2006 election.

As Orman expressed it in 2007, "What we said was that if the state was going to allow a fake institution to exist, we were going to turn that fake institution into a real party to hold Joe accountable."

Korchin, however, stated: "Connecticut for Lieberman is a new political party that carries on what used to be the ideals of the Democratic Party: A liberal approach to domestic issues coupled with a strong commitment to a robust foreign policy. New members who subscribe to this platform are welcome."

== Later activities and demise ==
Activist John Mertens was nominated as the party's candidate for United States Senate in 2010. Mertens had been an ardent critic of Senator Lieberman, and during an interview with Monmouth University's student newspaper, he said: "[In 2012] the party will run a candidate against Joe Lieberman!" Lieberman, however, announced in January 2011 that he would not seek re-election to his Senate seat in 2012.

In January 2013, the party lost its minor party status after not fielding any candidates in the November 2012 elections. Mertens, who left the party and became an Independent shortly after the elections, said, "We don't have a ballot line. With Joe retiring, its purpose has been kind of served."
