= 2006 United States Senate election in Connecticut =

- November 7, 2006
- Turnout: 59.87%
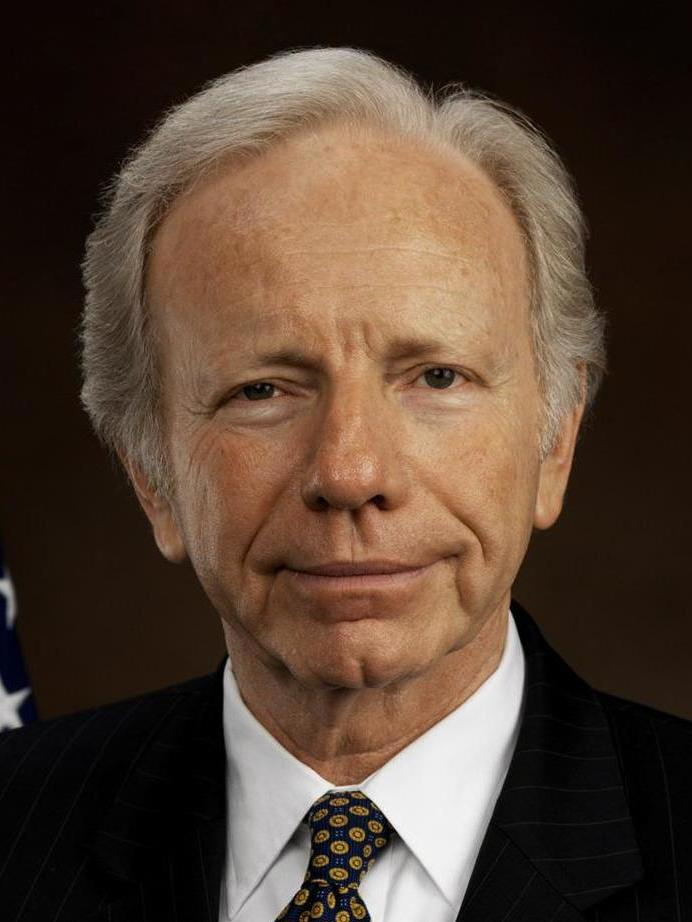

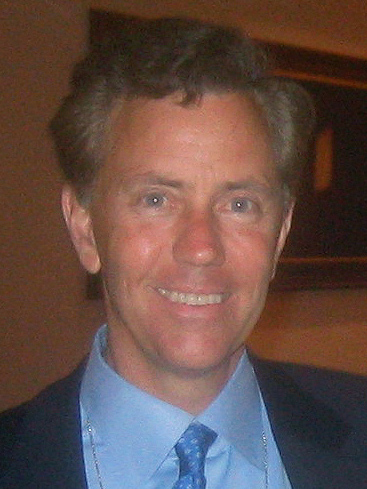

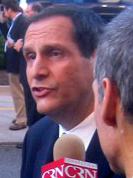
Nominee	Joe Lieberman	Ned Lamont	Alan Schlesinger
Party	Connecticut for Lieberman (Note: Although Lieberman ran on the Connecticut for Lieberman party ticket which appeared on the ballot, he sat in the Senate as an Independent Democrat.)	Democratic	Republican
Popular vote	564,095	450,844	109,198
Percentage	49.71%	39.73%	9.62%
- Lieberman: 40–50% 50–60% 60–70% Lamont: 40–50% 50–60% 60–70%
U.S. senator before election
Joe Lieberman
Democratic
Elected U.S. Senator
Joe Lieberman
Independent

The 2006 United States Senate election in Connecticut was held November 7, 2006. Incumbent Democratic U.S. Senator Joe Lieberman won his fourth and final term in the Senate, under the Connecticut for Lieberman party banner. Lieberman originally ran as a Democrat, but lost the August 8 Democratic primary to former Greenwich selectman, businessman, and future Connecticut governor Ned Lamont. Lieberman had been seen as vulnerable to a primary challenge due to his hawkish views on foreign policy, particularly his support for the Iraq War, and Lamont ran as an antiwar challenger, receiving support from the left of the party. The Republicans nominated Alan Schlesinger, the former mayor of Derby, whose campaign was marred by allegations of inappropriate gambling activities.

After losing the primary, Lieberman ran as a third-party candidate with the newly formed Connecticut for Lieberman party. He was not a member of this party, remaining a registered Democrat throughout the campaign. Most polls had Lieberman defeating Lamont. Lieberman raised more than double what Lamont did during the campaign, and won the general election. He continued to caucus with the Democrats, and was listed in the Senate records as an Independent Democrat. Lamont ran for governor in 2010, losing in the primary to eventual two-term governor Dannel Malloy. He ran again in 2018, winning both the primary election and the general election, and was re-elected in 2022.

== Democratic primary ==
The primary elections were held on August 8. The Democratic Party primary pitted Lieberman against Lamont.

=== Candidates ===
- Joe Lieberman, incumbent U.S. Senator and Democratic nominee for vice president in 2000
- Ned Lamont, former Greenwich selectman

=== Campaign ===
Because Connecticut was believed to be a Democratic stronghold, political analysts considered its Senate seat safe to remain Democratic, but Lieberman's continued support for conservative and Bush administration policies made him vulnerable to a Democratic primary challenger. Lieberman was criticized for a lack of commitment to the Democratic Party, opposition to affirmative action; his opposition to a Connecticut state law that would require Catholic hospitals to provide emergency contraception to rape victims, his membership in the bipartisan Gang of 14, his support of Florida Governor Jeb Bush's involvement in the Terri Schiavo case, his initial willingness to compromise on Social Security privatization, alliances with Republicans; and his attacks on other Democrats.

On March 13, 2006, Lamont announced his candidacy. He was more liberal than Lieberman, but he was not immune to criticism from within his party. The New Republic senior editor and "liberal hawk" Jonathan Chait, who was critical of Lieberman on a variety of issues, wrote:

I can't quite root for Lieberman to lose his primary. What's holding me back is that the anti-Lieberman campaign has come to stand for much more than Lieberman's sins. It's a test of strength for the new breed of left-wing activists who are flexing their muscles within the party. These are exactly the sorts of fanatics who tore the party apart in the late 1960s and early 1970s. They think in simple slogans and refuse to tolerate any ideological dissent.

Early polling showed Lieberman with as much as a 46-point lead, but subsequent polls showed Lamont gaining until he took the lead just weeks before the primary. A controversy about a "kiss" Lieberman supposedly received from Bush during the 2005 State of the Union address highlighted concerns that he was too close to Bush to be a credible Democratic nominee. Lieberman released several campaign advertisements over the summer seeking to connect himself to former President Bill Clinton and to portray Lamont as standing for little more than opposition to Lieberman. Lamont struck back with an ad produced by political consultant Bill Hillsman, in which a narrator says, "Meet Ned Lamont. He can't make a decent cup of coffee, he's a bad karaoke singer, and he has a messy desk." Lamont then chimes in, "Aren't you sick of political attack ads that insult your intelligence? Senator Lieberman, let's stick to issues and pledge to support whoever wins the Democratic primary."

From mid-morning August 7 to well past August 9, Lieberman's official campaign site was taken offline; officials from Lieberman's campaign claimed "dirty politics" and "Rovian tactics" by Lamont's supporters, and more specifically, a sustained Distributed Denial of Service attack that, according to the Lieberman campaign, had left the site down for several days.

Tim Tagaris, Lamont's Internet communications director, denied the charge and attributed the downtime to the fact that the Lieberman campaign had chosen an inferior web host, or ISP, paying $15/month to operate its site (as opposed to the $1,500/month the Lamont campaign spent). On December 20, 2006, a joint investigation by Connecticut Attorney General Richard Blumenthal's office and the U.S. attorney's office cleared the Lamont campaign of the hacking accusations. A spokesman for Kevin O'Connor, the U.S. Attorney for Connecticut, said, "The investigation has revealed no evidence the problems the website experienced were the result of criminal conduct."

Lieberman was backed by the Human Rights Campaign, the United States Chamber of Commerce, the Defenders of Wildlife, and Planned Parenthood; he was endorsed by The Hartford Courant, The New Haven Register, and the Connecticut Post. Lamont was backed by the National Organization for Women, MoveOn.org, and Democracy for America; he was endorsed by The New York Times. Lamont won the primary with 51.79% of the vote to Lieberman's 48.21%. In his concession speech, Lieberman announced that he would keep his promise to run as an independent if he lost the Democratic primary. In the Republican primary, Alan Schlesinger drew fire in July when it was revealed that he had been gambling under an alias in order to avoid detection as a card counter. Schlesinger remained in the race despite calls to withdraw, ultimately becoming the Republican nominee when no other candidates entered the race.

=== Fundraising ===
Campaign finance reports as of July 19, 2006
Candidate	Raised	Spent	Cash on hand
Joe Lieberman (D)	$8,730,280	$6,662,499	$3,487,184
Ned Lamont (D)	$4,171,447	$3,758,517	$414,284
Source: Federal Election Commission

=== Debate ===
On July 6, 2006, Lamont and Lieberman met in a televised debate held by a Connecticut NBC-TV affiliate and carried live nationally by C-SPAN. Journalists in the studio asked questions, with several videotaped questions by voters also included. The debate largely centered on the Iraq war and the candidates' records and experience.

=== Convention ===
In order to force Lieberman into a primary, Lamont needed to get the support of at least 15% of the total delegates at the Democratic convention. He would end up easily doing so.

May 19, Democratic convention
Party	Candidate	Votes	%
Democratic	Joe Lieberman (incumbent)	1,004	66.53%
Democratic	Ned Lamont	505	33.47%
Total votes		1,509	100.00%

=== Results ===
Results by county Lamont: 50–60% 60–70% 70–80% 80–90% >90% Lieberman: 50–60% 60–70%

Results by municipality Lamont: 50–60% 60–70% 70–80% 80–90% >90% Lieberman: 50–60% 60–70%

August 8, Democratic primary results
Party	Candidate	Votes	%
Democratic	Ned Lamont	146,404	51.75%
Democratic	Joe Lieberman (incumbent)	136,490	48.25%
Total votes		282,894	100.00%

== General election ==
=== Candidates ===
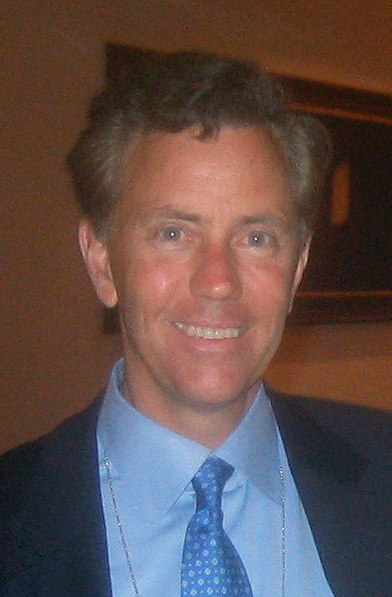
Ned Lamont

- Ned Lamont (D): On August 8, Greenwich businessman Ned Lamont received 52% of the vote in the Democratic primary for one of Connecticut's seats in the United States Senate, defeating incumbent Senator Joe Lieberman, who ran in the November election as a petitioning candidate of the Connecticut for Lieberman party line. To get on the primary ballot on May 19, 2006, Lamont received 33% of the vote at the Democratic State Convention, well above the 15% threshold needed to appear on the ballot without having to collect signatures. Sean Smith, Lieberman's campaign manager at the time, dismissed his performance, claiming that many delegates at the convention saw the endorsement question as a "free vote" to "register displeasure with Lieberman without it costing them anything", and speculated that they would return to Lieberman in the primary. Lieberman dismissed Smith as his campaign manager the morning after his primary defeat on August 8. Lamont differed from Lieberman on various issues. He opposed the Iraq War and the USA Patriot Act, opposed the creditor-friendly changes to U.S. bankruptcy law, opposed federal intervention in cases such as the Terri Schiavo case, opposed the federal earmark system, and said he would have been much more aggressive than Lieberman against the Samuel Alito nomination.
- Alan Schlesinger (R): On May 20, 2006, Connecticut Republicans nominated former Derby Mayor Alan Schlesinger. In July, it was revealed that he was involved in inappropriate gambling activities: he gambled under the alias "Alan Gold" to avoid detection as a card counter. On July 21, the Hartford Courant reported that Schlesinger had been sued by two New Jersey casinos for gambling debts. He quickly faced flak from state party officials and some, including Connecticut Governor Jodi Rell, called on him to withdraw. Connecticut GOP chairman George Gallo had considered previous Republican Senate candidate Jack Orchulli as a possible replacement if Schlesinger had withdrawn. On July 24, Courant columnist Kevin Rennie suggested former State Senator Bill Aniskovich of Branford—who was defeated in 2004 while seeking his eighth term—would replace Schlesinger if he withdrew. Other possible replacements included U.S. Attorney Kevin O'Connor, State Senator John McKinney of Fairfield and Derby state representative Themis Klarides.

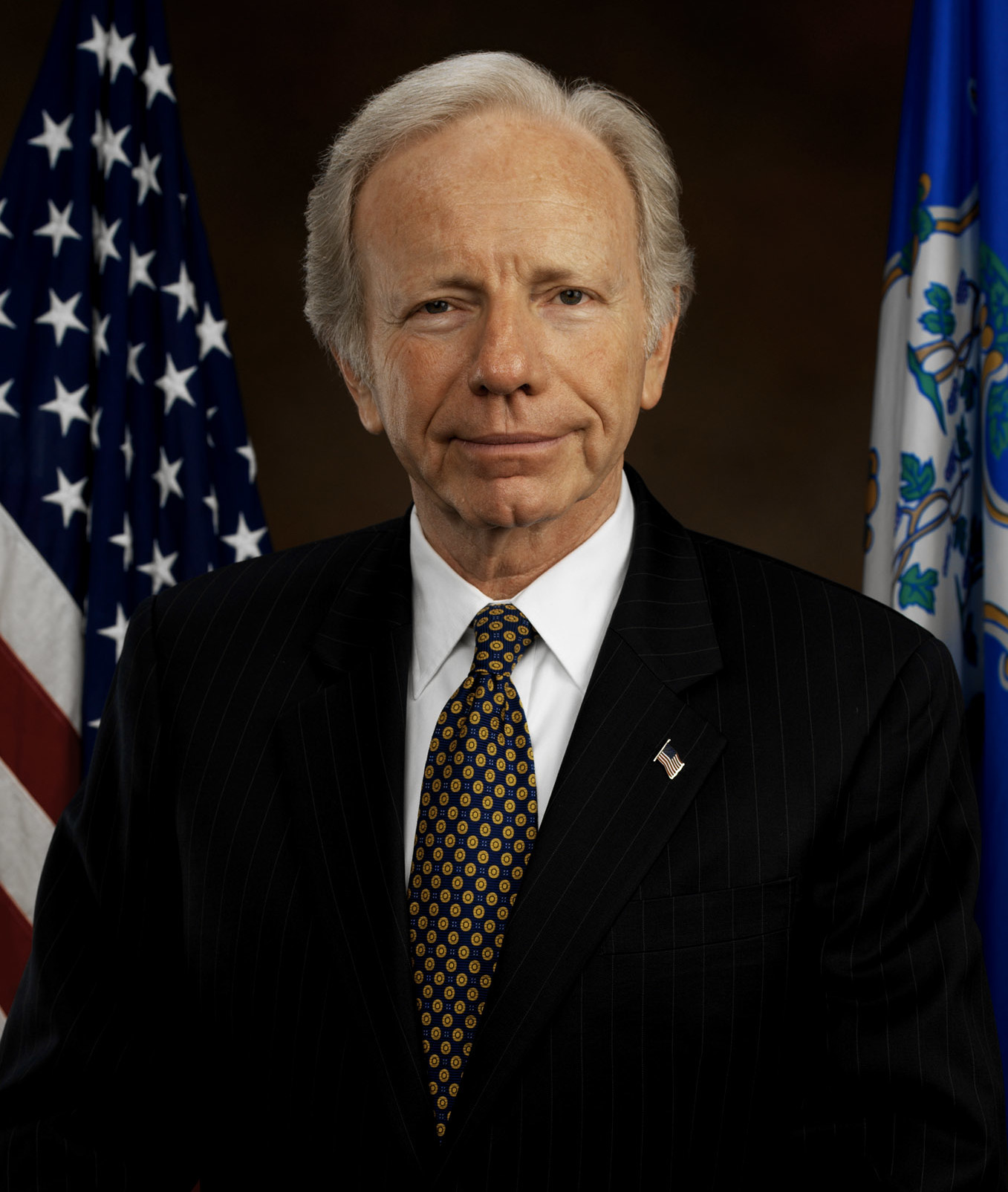
Joe Lieberman

- Joe Lieberman (I), the incumbent three-term senator, was running for his fourth term. Lieberman was Al Gore's vice presidential running mate in the 2000 election. Gore lost the election to George W. Bush. After a heated primary, Lieberman lost to Lamont, 52% to 48%. Soon after his defeat, his campaign submitted the required signatures to run under the new Connecticut for Lieberman Party. While many of his Democratic colleagues tried to convince him not to run, he stood firm. The day after losing in the primary, Lieberman fired most of his campaign staff, including his campaign manager.
- Ralph Ferrucci (G): Connecticut Green Party nominee, artist, truck driver, 2004 congressional candidate, and 2003 "Guilty Party" New Haven mayoral candidate. Ferrucci received more than 15% of the vote when he challenged New Haven mayor John DeStefano Jr. in 2003. He had the least amount of money on hand of all the candidates and claimed to be the only candidate to publicly state his disapproval over Israel's invasion of Lebanon.
- Timothy Knibbs (CC) ran as the nominee of the Concerned Citizens Party. He also ran for the state's other senate seat in 2004.

=== Campaign ===
==== Connecticut for Lieberman party ====
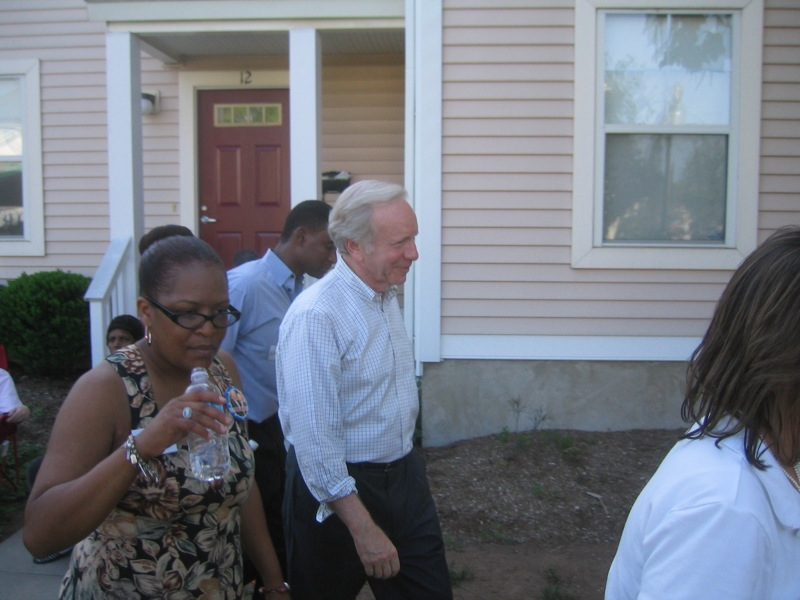
Lieberman during his re-election campaign on a third party ticket

On June 12, Lamont began running radio ads promising if he lost the primary to endorse Lieberman and challenging Lieberman to make a similar pledge. Lieberman refused; his campaign manager, Sean Smith said, "Are we going to support Ned Lamont? Uh, no!" On July 3 in Hartford, Lieberman announced that he would collect signatures to guarantee himself a position on the November ballot. Lieberman and Smith said that Lieberman would run as a "petitioning Democrat" and caucus with Senate Democrats if elected. On July 10, the Lieberman campaign officially filed paperwork allowing him to collect signatures to form a new political party, the Connecticut for Lieberman party.

After Lieberman's announcement, independent polls showed him favored to win a plurality or outright majority of the vote in a three-way general election. The petition issue led to charges against the Lieberman campaign of political opportunism and lack of respect for the political process. Lieberman received strong support from many prominent conservative pundits and publications. "[H]is most vocal support came from places like The Weekly Standard, National Review, and Commentary Magazine; Sean Hannity, Bill Kristol and right-wing radio hosts cheered for his victory." Thus "Lieberman was able to run in the general election as the de facto Republican candidate—every major Republican office-holder in the state endorsed him—and to supplement that GOP base with strong support from independents."

On August 29, Lieberman began airing an ad, "Soothing", featuring images of a sunset over an ocean beach, while a female narrator says "you might enjoy a break from Ned Lamont's negative advertising. So just sit back and think about—good stuff." The Lamont campaign stood by its ads. There was some debate over what impact Lieberman's campaign would have on several tight House races in Connecticut. Some argued that Lieberman would bring out Republican supporters, who would vote for Lieberman and then cross over to support the Republican House candidates. Of those candidates, incumbents Nancy Johnson and Rob Simmons lost their bids for reelection while Chris Shays was reelected.

==== Democratic reaction ====
On August 9, Democratic Senate Minority Leader Harry Reid and DSCC Chair Chuck Schumer issued the following joint statement on the Connecticut Senate race:

The Democratic voters of Connecticut have spoken and chosen Ned Lamont as their nominee. Both we and the Democratic Senatorial Campaign Committee (DSCC) fully support Mr. Lamont's candidacy. Congratulations to Ned on his victory and on a race well run. Joe Lieberman has been an effective Democratic Senator for Connecticut and for America. But the perception was that he was too close to George Bush and this election was, in many respects, a referendum on the President more than anything else. The results bode well for Democratic victories in November and our efforts to take the country in a new direction.

According to The Hill, a Democratic aide to a high-ranking senator commented that Lieberman might be stripped of his Democratic privileges in the Senate. "At this point Lieberman cannot expect to just keep his seniority," said the aide. "He can't run against a Democrat and expect to waltz back to the caucus with the same seniority as before. It would give the view that the Senate is a country club rather than representative of a political party and political movement."

On August 21, a group of New Haven Democrats cited Connecticut General Statutes section 9–61 in a complaint filed with the New Haven Democratic Registrar of Voters, Sharon Ferrucci, demanding that she purge Lieberman from the Democratic voter rolls. The statute reads in part: "Knowingly becoming a candidate for office on ticket of a new party automatically separates voter from his former party." Lieberman's campaign manager called it a "dirty political trick". Ferrucci rejected the complaint.

==== Waterbury statement controversy ====
Lamont campaign manager Tom Swan criticized the strongly pro-Lieberman city of Waterbury for alleged corruption, calling it a meeting place for "forces of evil". Waterbury's mayor, Michael Jarjura, endorsed Lieberman after the primary. Swan later apologized for the comment, saying it was aimed at former mayor Philip Giordano, who was arrested for sexual crimes with a minor, and former Governor John G. Rowland, a Waterbury native, who was indicted for corruption. Giordano and Rowland were forced to resign from their positions due to criminal activities. Jarjura failed to accept Swan's apology, so Lamont himself apologized for the comments. On August 22 Lamont announced former Democratic state chairman George Jepsen would be chair his general election campaign. He denied this was a demotion of Swan.

==== "Al-Qaeda candidate" ====
On August 11, CNN Headline News anchor Chuck Roberts asked Hotline senior editor John Mercurio about the effects of the recent London terrorist plot on the 2006 Connecticut Senate race:

How does this factor into the Lieberman/Lamont contest? And might some argue, as some have, that Lamont is the Al-Qaeda candidate?

Roberts later apologized personally to Lamont on the air:

You know, I owe you an apology. Last week, I led into an interview with a guest analyst and really botched the setup. The guest had wanted to discuss the Dick Cheney and Joe Lieberman statements suggesting that terror groups—"Al Qaeda-type", to use Cheney's words—would be buoyed by your win, but I posed it badly, stupidly ad-libbing about "some saying Lamont is the Al-Qaeda candidate." No one, in fact, used that construction. Anyway, I wanted to correct the record, and I'm glad we had this chance to do it.

==== Impact of Lamont allies ====
Opinion columnist Robert Novak stated that Democratic leaders feared the visible role black activists Al Sharpton and Jesse Jackson had at Lamont's primary night rally "might drive Republican, independent and even some Democratic voters into support of Lieberman's independent candidacy."

==== Vets for Freedom ====
On August 15, 2006, the Stamford Advocate reported that an organization called Vets For Freedom had run full-page ads in the Hartford Courant in support of Lieberman. Lamont supporters claimed that Vets for Freedom was a de facto Republican organization and pointed out the similarities between it and the Swift Vets, who had connections to Republican officials.

==== Email controversy ====
In early September, Lamont attacked Lieberman's response to the 1998 scandal involving President Clinton's affair with intern Monica Lewinsky, claiming Lieberman had created a "media spectacle". Lieberman responded by releasing an email Lamont sent him at the time, in which Lamont wrote he reluctantly supported Lieberman's stance critical of Clinton.

I reluctantly supported the moral outrage you expressed on September 3. I was reluctant because I thought it might make matters worse; I was reluctant because nobody expressed moral outrage over how Reagan treated his kids or Gingrich lied about supporting term limits (in other words, it was selective outrage); I was reluctant because the Starr inquisition is much more threatening to our civil liberties and national interest than Clinton's misbehavior ...

Lamont then called for Lieberman to "move on" from publicly criticizing Clinton:

You have expressed your outrage about the president's conduct; now stand up and use your moral authority to put an end to this snowballing mess. We all know the facts, a lot more than any of us care to know and should know. We've made up our minds that Clinton did wrong, confessed to his sin, maybe he should be censured for lying—and let's move on.

Lieberman's speech in 1998 had occurred after the President had gone on prime time television to admit his relationship with Lewinsky. Lieberman believes his speech defused partisan tension over a "media spectacle" already present prior to the senator's speech.

==== Turncoat ads ====
In late September, Lamont's campaign aired a controversial television ad that depicted various actors portraying Connecticut voters calling Lieberman a turncoat. One ad suggested that voters should wear their coats inside out to protest Lieberman's campaign as an independent candidate. Lieberman responded with the "Blackboard" ad, where the words Democrat and Republican are separated by a line and Lieberman erased it, stressing his appeal was primarily to the state's largest voter bloc, unaffiliated voters.

=== Fundraising ===
In the days before the Democratic primary, the Lieberman campaign invoked the "millionaire rule", alleging that Lamont's personal campaign contributions had exceeded federal limits. Despite having more than double Lamont's funding, Lieberman accepted contributions up to a higher $6,300 limit per individual. The normal limit was $2,300. Between the primary and the general election, Lamont added over $2 million of his own money to his campaign effort. According to published reports, Lamont had spent over $12.7 million of personal funds on his campaign as of late October, while Lieberman had raised over $14 million.

Campaign finance reports as of December 31st, 2006
Candidate	Raised	Spent	Cash on hand
Joe Lieberman (CFL)	$20,248,479	$19,099,162	$2,245,537
Ned Lamont (D)	$20,580,703	$20,557,217	$23,486
Alan Schlesinger (R)	$220,984	$204,113	$16,954
Source: Federal Election Commission

=== Endorsements ===
Joe Lieberman

U.S. senators

- David Boren, Oklahoma (1979-1994)
- John Breaux, Louisiana (1987-2005)
- Richard Bryan, Nevada (1989 - 2001)
- Tom Carper, Delaware
- Susan Collins, Maine (Republican)
- J. Bennett Johnston, Louisiana (1997-1992)
- Bob Kerrey, Nebraska (1989-2001)
- Mary Landrieu, Louisiana
- Ben Nelson, Nebraska
- Mark Pryor, Arkansas
- Ken Salazar, Colorado

U.S. representatives

- Ed Case, HI-02
- Harold Ford Jr., TN-09
- Newt Gingrich, GA-06 (1979-1999) and former U.S. House speaker (Republican)
- Jack Kemp, NY-31 (1971-1989) (Republican)
- Mark Kennedy, MN-06 (Republican)
- John Lewis, GA-05
- Chris Shays, CT-04 (Republican)
- Brad Sherman, CA-27

Local officials

- Michael Bloomberg, Mayor of New York City (Republican)
- Rudy Giuliani, former Mayor of New York City (Republican)

Individuals

- Mike McGavick, businessman (Republican)
- William F. Buckley Jr., author and political commentator (Republican)
- Ann Coulter, author and political commentator (Republican)

Newspapers

- The New York Post
- The Washington Post
Ned Lamont

Democratic senators

- Daniel Akaka, Hawaii
- Evan Bayh, Indiana
- Joe Biden, Delaware
- Barbara Boxer, California
- Robert Byrd, West Virginia (former Majority Leader)
- Maria Cantwell, Washington
- Hillary Clinton, New York
- Mark Dayton, Minnesota
- Chris Dodd, Connecticut
- Dick Durbin, Illinois (Minority Whip)
- Russ Feingold, Wisconsin
- Dianne Feinstein, California
- Tom Harkin, Iowa
- Daniel Inouye, Hawaii
- Ted Kennedy, Massachusetts
- John Kerry, Massachusetts
- Herb Kohl, Wisconsin
- Frank Lautenberg, New Jersey
- Patrick Leahy, Vermont
- Patty Murray, Washington
- Barack Obama, Illinois
- Jack Reed, Rhode Island
- Harry Reid, Nevada (Minority Leader)
- Jay Rockefeller, West Virginia
- Chuck Schumer, New York
- Debbie Stabenow, Michigan
- Ron Wyden, Oregon

Other Democrats

- State Treasurer Bob Casey Jr., Pennsylvania*
- General Wesley Clark, Arkansas
- Former U.S. Senator John Edwards, North Carolina
- Reverend and 1984, 1988 Democratic primary candidate Jesse Jackson, South Carolina
- Governor Bill Richardson, New Mexico
- Reverend and 2004 Democratic primary candidate Al Sharpton, New York
- Former Governor Mark Warner, Virginia

* = candidate for U.S. Senate in his home state Local officials

- John DeStefano, Mayor of New Haven and Democratic gubernatorial nominee
- Dannel Malloy, Mayor of Stamford

Organizations

- United Automobile Workers
- Service Employees International Union

Newspapers

- The New York Times

=== Debates ===
- Complete video of debate, October 16, 2006
- Complete video of debate, October 18, 2006
- Complete video of debate, October 23, 2006

=== Predictions ===
Source	Ranking	As of
The Cook Political Report	Solid I (flip)	November 6, 2006
Sabato's Crystal Ball	Lean I (flip)	November 6, 2006
Rothenberg Political Report	Solid I (flip)	November 6, 2006
Real Clear Politics	Solid I (flip)	November 6, 2006

=== Polling ===
View source data.

Date	Ned Lamont (D)	Alan Schlesinger (R)	Joe Lieberman (CFL)	Margin of error (+/- %)
May 2, 2006	13%	10%	56%	2.5%
June 8, 2006	18%	8%	56%	2.1%
June 19, 2006	29%	15%	44%	4.5%
July 20, 2006	27%	9%	51%	2%
July 23, 2006	40%	13%	40%	3%
August 12, 2006	41%	6%	46%	4.5%
August 17, 2006	41%	4%	53%	2.7%
August 21, 2006	43%	6%	45%	4.5%
August 22, 2006	42%	3%	44%	3.5%
August 28, 2006	39.4%	2%	49.4%	4.2%
September 10, 2006	49%	3%	46%	4.3%
September 12, 2006	38%	7%	51%	4.2%
September 14, 2006	43%	5%	45%	4.5%
September 19, 2006	45%	3%	47%	4%
September 28, 2006	44%	4%	45.8%	4.2%
September 28, 2006	39%	5%	49%	2.9%
October 5, 2006	33%	4%	53%	4.1%
October 5, 2006	40%	6%	50%	4.5%
October 11, 2006	40%	4%	53%	4.2%
October 19, 2006	43.2%	4%	48.6%	4.3%
October 20, 2006	37%	8%	49%	4%
October 20, 2006	35%	7%	52%	3.3%
October 31, 2006	42.5%	6%	47.4%	4.3%
October 31, 2006	40%	9%	48%	4.5%
November 1, 2006	37%	8%	49%	3.2%
November 2, 2006	37%	8%	49%	4.1%
November 3, 2006	39%	7%	51%	4%
November 5, 2006	38%	9%	49%	3.9%
November 6, 2006	38%	8%	50%	3.8%

== Results ==
Lieberman won with approximately 50% of the vote, and served a six-year term from January 3, 2007, to January 3, 2013. Exit polls showed that Lieberman won the vote of 33% of Democrats, 54% of independents and 70% of Republicans.

Turnout map by municipality 30–40% 40–50% 50–60% 60–70% 70–80%

2006 United States Senate election in Connecticut
Party	Candidate	Votes	%
Connecticut for Lieberman	Joe Lieberman (incumbent)	564,095	49.71%
Democratic	Ned Lamont	450,844	39.73%
Republican	Alan Schlesinger	109,198	9.62%
Green	Ralph Ferrucci	5,922	0.52%
Concerned Citizens	Timothy Knibbs	4,638	0.41%
Write-in	Carl E. Vassar	80	0.01%
Total votes		1,134,777	100.0%
Connecticut for Lieberman gain from Democratic			

=== By county ===
County	Joseph Lieberman Connecticut for Lieberman		Ned Lamont Democratic		Alan Schlesinger Republican		Various candidates Other parties		Total votes cast	
County	Fairfield	140,174	51.42%	105,792	38.81%	24,659	9.05%	1,968	0.72%	272,593
Hartford	131,950	45.95%	124,914	43.5%	27,456	9.56%	2,857	1.0%	287,177	
Litchfield	35,864	50.02%	25,877	36.09%	9,139	12.75%	819	1.14%	71,699	
Middlesex	31,012	48.07%	26,768	41.49%	6,147	9.53%	592	0.92%	64,519	
New Haven	139,481	53.34%	94,848	36.27%	24,650	9.43%	2,514	0.96%	261,493	
New London	44,943	50.89%	34,713	39.3%	7,830	8.87%	835	0.94%	88,321	
Tolland	24,187	44.84%	23,390	43.36%	5,733	10.63%	634	1.18%	53,944	
Windham	16,484	47.05%	14,542	41.51%	3,584	10.23%	424	1.22%	35,034	
Total	564,095	49.71%	450,844	39.73%	109,198	9.62%	10,643	0.93%	1,134,780	

Counties that flipped from Democratic to Independent

- All 8

County Flips: Independent Flip from Democratic

=== By congressional district ===
Lieberman won all five congressional districts, including four of that elected Democrats.

District	Lieberman	Lamont	Schlesinger	Representative
1st	46%	44%	9%	John B. Larson
2nd	49%	40%	10%	Rob Simmons (109th Congress)
2nd	49%	40%	10%	Joe Courtney (110th Congress)
3rd	52%	38%	9%	Rosa DeLauro
4th	52%	39%	8%	Christopher Shays
5th	50%	38%	11%	Nancy L. Johnson (109th Congress)
5th	50%	38%	11%	Chris Murphy (110th Congress)

== See also ==
- 2006 United States Senate elections
