= Senator Herbst =

Senator Herbst may refer to:

- Della Herbst (born 1935), Wyoming State Senate
- Marie Herbst (1928–2015), Connecticut State Senate
