= Wilda Hamerman =

American politician (1924–2016)

Member of the Connecticut House of Representatives from the 114th district
- In office 1974–1977
- Preceded by: John D. McHugh
- Succeeded by: William E. Taber Jr.

Personal details
- Born: Wilda Grace Slevin; March 15, 1924 Brooklyn, New York, U.S.
- Died: September 1, 2016 (aged 92) Hamden, Connecticut, U.S.
- Party: Democratic
- Spouse: Martin Hamerman

Wilda Grace Hamerman (née Slevin; March 15, 1924 – September 1, 2016) was an American politician who served in the Connecticut House of Representatives from 1974 to 1977, representing the 114th district.

Hamerman was born in Brooklyn, New York, in 1924, and moved to Orange, Connecticut, in 1960. She was Jewish.

Prior to serving in the Connecticut House of Representatives, Hamerman worked as an administrator at the University of New Haven, and at Yale University, where she primarily worked as a secretary to literary critic and professor Norman Holmes Pearson. The Beinecke Rare Book and Manuscript Library at Yale keeps an archive of correspondence written by Hamerman throughout the 1960s and 70s.
