= Mary Welander =

American politician

Member of the Connecticut House of Representatives from the 114th district
- Incumbent
- Assumed office January 6, 2021
- Preceded by: Themis Klarides

Personal details
- Born: 1978 (age 47–48)
- Party: Democratic
- Spouse: Matt Welander
- Children: 3
- Education: University of Massachusetts Amherst (BA)

Mary Welander (born 1978) is an American politician serving as a member of the Connecticut House of Representatives from the 114th district. Elected in November 2020, she assumed office on January 6, 2021.

== Education ==
Welander earned a Bachelor of Arts degree from the University of Massachusetts Amherst.

== Career ==
A resident of Orange, Connecticut, Welander served as a member of the Orange Board of Education in 2017, and served in the roles of Vice Chair for both the Finance subcommittee and the Policy, Personnel, and Transportation subcommittee. She was elected to the Connecticut House of Representatives in November 2020 and assumed office on January 6, 2021. She also serves as vice chair of the House Children Committee.

== Personal life ==
Welander and her husband, Matt, have three children. Matt is a professor at the Yale School of Drama.
