= Republican-American =

Newspaper in Waterbury, Connecticut

- Type: Daily newspaper
- Format: Broadsheet
- Owner: Hearst Communications
- Founder: William J. Pape
- Publisher: William B. Pape II
- Editor: William J. Pape II
- Managing editor: Anne Karolyi
- Founded: 1844
- Language: English
- Headquarters: 389 Meadow Street, Waterbury, Connecticut 06722-2090
- Website: rep-am.com

The Republican-American, sometimes shorted to RepAm, is a daily newspaper based in Waterbury, Connecticut, serving Waterbury, the Naugatuck Valley, and parts of Litchfield and New Haven counties. Its origins date to the founding of the Waterbury American in 1844 and the Waterbury Republican in 1881, which came under common ownership of the Pape family in 1922 and were merged as the Republican-American in 1990. Hearst Connecticut Media group, a division of Hearst Communications, bought the publication from the Pape family on February 5, 2025.

== Circulation ==
Three dozen communities in New Haven and Litchfield counties receive the newspaper, among them being: Greater Waterbury, the Naugatuck Valley, and Litchfield County. Besides Waterbury, it is sold in Ansonia, Beacon Falls, Bethlehem, Bridgewater, Canaan, Cheshire, Colebrook, Cornwall, Falls Village, Goshen, Harwinton, Kent, Litchfield, Middlebury, Morris, Naugatuck, New Hartford, New Milford, North Canaan, Oxford, Plymouth, Prospect, Roxbury, Salisbury, Seymour, Sharon, Southbury, Terryville, Thomaston, Torrington, Warren, Washington, Watertown, Winchester, Winsted, Wolcott, and Woodbury.

== History ==
=== Early history ===
The Republican-American traces its origins to two earlier Waterbury newspapers, the American and the Republican. The Waterbury American was founded by Josiah Giles as a weekly newspaper in December 1844 and became a daily afternoon paper in 1866, while the Waterbury Republican was established by John Henry Morrow as a weekly in 1881, converted to daily publication in 1884, and shifted from afternoon to morning publication two years later. (Note: The History section is fully derived from the Republican-American website's History page)

In 1901, William Jamieson Pape and William M. Lathrop purchased the Republican. According to the newspaper's later account of its history, its circulation increased substantially after its coverage of a major downtown Waterbury fire that burned from the evening of February 2 into the early morning of February 3, 1902. Pape became the Republican's sole owner in 1910 and acquired the Waterbury American in 1922. The two newspapers continued to be published separately, with the Republican appearing in the morning and the American in the afternoon. A Sunday edition of the Republican began publication in 1906. Ownership of both papers was retained in the Pape family for a century, with the decision to merge them to form the Republican-American coming in 1990. (Note: The History section is fully derived from the Republican-American website's History page)

=== Eastern Color Printing ===
In 1924, the Republican and American began printing their Sunday comics in color and selling color-printing services to other newspapers. Pape subsequently established the Waterbury-based Eastern Color Printing Company to handle the growing printing business. Eastern became an important early producer of comic books, publishing Funnies on Parade in 1933 and Famous Funnies in 1934, works considered the earliest examples of the modern American comic book. The publications reprinted newspaper comic strips including Mutt and Jeff, Donald Dare the Demon Reporter, and Buck Rogers.

=== Pulitzer Prize ===
In the 1930s, the Republican and American began investigating irregularities in Waterbury’s voter-registration rolls after a sudden increase in registered voters. Reporters found names belonging to people who had died or moved away, and the city’s Democratic and Republican registrars of voters were subsequently removed from office. The newspapers later turned their attention to Mayor T. Frank Hayes. After Sherwood Rowland was elected city comptroller in 1937, he uncovered evidence of possible financial misconduct involving the Hayes administration and provided information to the Republican.

In 1940, the Waterbury Republican & American received the Pulitzer Prize for Public Service "For its campaign exposing municipal graft." The award recognized the coverage of a major corruption scandal involving Waterbury mayor and Connecticut lieutenant governor T. Frank Hayes. During Hayes's administration, he and several associates were accused of using kickbacks, fraudulent municipal contracts, and other schemes to divert millions of dollars from the city. A grand jury indicted Hayes and 22 others, and Hayes was convicted in 1939.

=== Union Station ===
Union Station train depot in Waterbury, Connecticut, 2011

The Republican-American was headquartered for more than seven decades in Waterbury’s former Union Station at 389 Meadow Street. The station was built in 1909 for the New York, New Haven and Hartford Railroad and designed by the architectural firm McKim, Mead & White. Its most prominent feature is a 240-foot clock tower modeled on the Torre del Mangia in Siena, Italy. The clock tower was added in 1916, reportedly at the request of the railroad’s president, and contains four Seth Thomas clock faces, each 16 feet in diameter. The building was added to the National Register of Historic Places in 1978 for its architectural and transportation significance.

The Pape family purchased the former station in 1952 and converted it into the newspaper’s headquarters. According to the Society of Architectural Historians, the station had been slated for demolition before the Pape family acquired and renovated it. The building remained the home of the Republican-American until 2025, when Hearst Connecticut Media Group, which had acquired the newspaper earlier that year, vacated the property after its lease was terminated by American-Republican Inc. The property was placed on the market after the Hearst sale and was still being considered for redevelopment in 2026.

=== Awards and recognition ===
In addition to its 1940 Pulitzer Prize, The Republican-American has received repeated recognition from the New England Newspaper & Press Association (NENPA). It was named New England Newspaper of the Year in several circulation categories, including for its weekday edition in 2015, 2019, 2021, 2022, and 2023, and for its Sunday edition in 2014, 2016, 2017, and 2023. It also received Distinguished Newspaper honors in 2016, 2018, 2020, and 2024. NENPA has also recognized the paper for numerous individual reporting projects.

=== Hearst Communications sale ===
In December 2024, the Pape family entered into negotiations to sell the paper to Hearst Communications. The sale was closed on February 5, 2025.

== Editorial stance ==
The Republican-American describes itself as having a socially and fiscally conservative editorial stance. It advocates what it considers to be pro-business government policies, such as tax cuts and regulatory reform. The Republican-American claims that it is "quick to blow the whistle on what it views as wasteful use of tax dollars, as well as what it sees as unnecessary growth of local, state or federal government". The newspaper is a frequent critic of the demands of organized labor, especially public-employee unions, arguing they compel governments and businesses to spend beyond their means.

The paper advocates for a more interventionist approach to foreign policy, asserting that "if the U.S. is not quick to forcefully denounce and, if necessary, take action against, aggressive and anti-democratic actions by anti-American regimes and groups, America’s enemies will be emboldened".

Owing to its editorial stance, the Republican-American typically endorses Republican candidates for office. The paper endorsed Bob Stefanowski in the 2022 and 2018 Connecticut gubernatorial elections.

The Republican-American has often labeled Democratic officials and candidates as communists or socialists, and the paper's editorial board has been criticized by newspaper trade publication Editor & Publisher for "McCarthyism" and "red-baiting". The editorial board of the Republican-American has accused former Senator Chris Dodd of being "chief apologist for the communist tyrants", Senate candidate Ned Lamont of being a Stalinist, and claimed "Marxists-Socialists" control the Democratic Party.

The paper's editorial board attracted widescale attention and condemnation after publishing a piece titled "Is New Orleans Worth Reclaiming?", following the impact of Hurricane Katrina.

=== Controversies ===
The newspaper trade publication Editor & Publisher heavily criticized the Republican-American in an August 2006 piece. The publication highlighted an editorial the Republican-American wrote on then-candidate for U.S. Senate Ned Lamont, which called Lamont and his family communists. Editor & Publisher rebuked the piece for being "rife with errors", including calling famous American financier J.P. Morgan "the sugar daddy for the American Communist Party and other extreme left-wing organizations".

The Republican-American faced nationwide scorn for August 2005 editorial, "Is New Orleans Worth Reclaiming?", which called for the abandonment of New Orleans following Hurricane Katrina. The New Orleans Times-Picayune responded to the Republican-American in an editorial titled "Yes, We're Worth It", labeling the paper "heartless" and asking "How dare they?".
