= 2018 Connecticut gubernatorial election =

- November 6, 2018
- Turnout: 65.23% (▲9.63%)
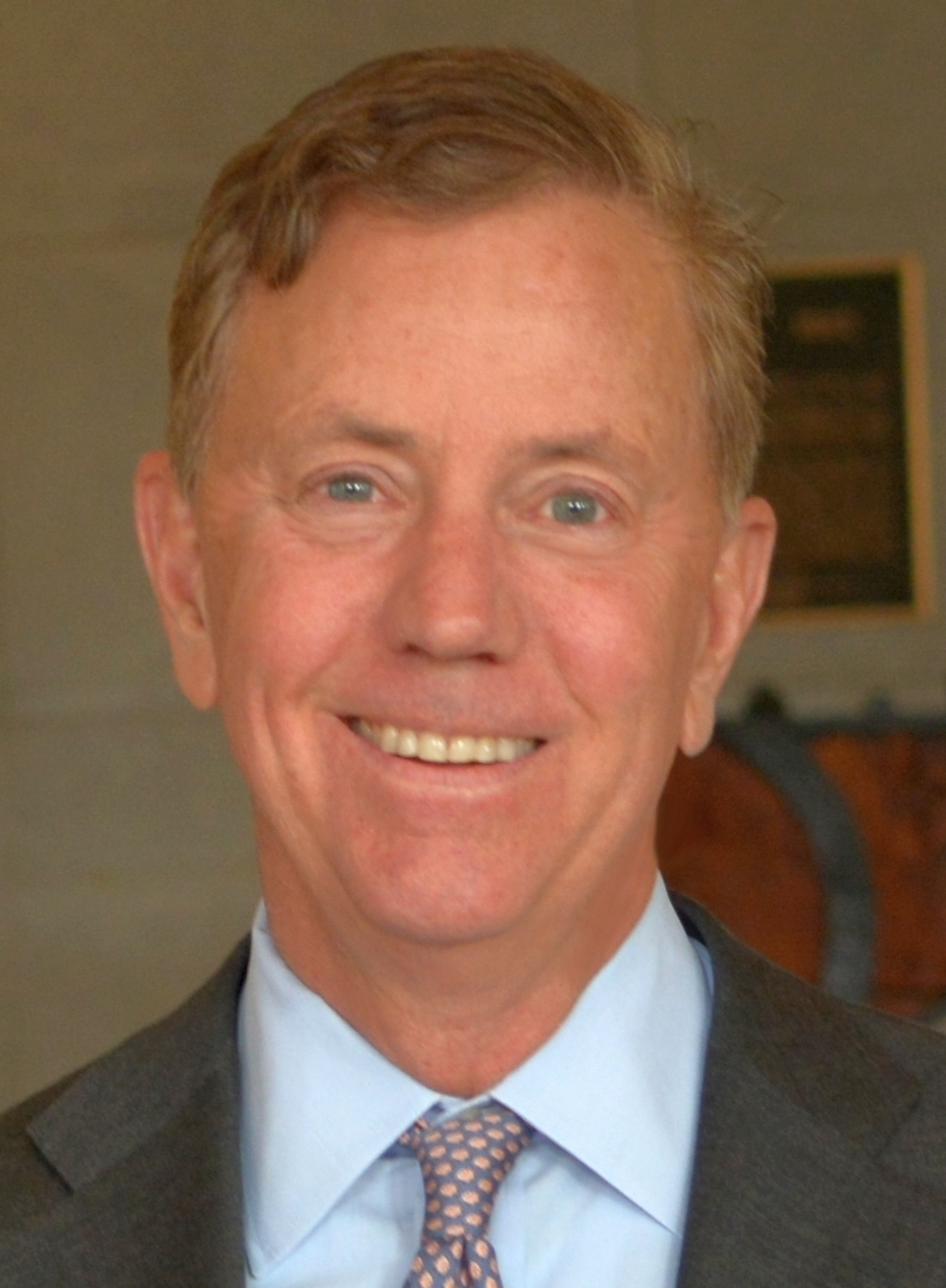

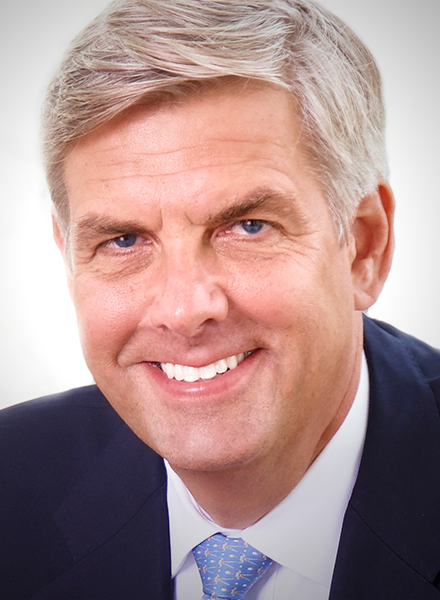
Nominee	Ned Lamont	Bob Stefanowski
Party	Democratic	Republican
Alliance	Working Families	Independent
Running mate	Susan Bysiewicz	Joe Markley
Popular vote	694,510	650,138
Percentage	49.37%	46.21%
- Lamont: 40–50% 50–60% 60–70% 70–80% 80–90% >90% Stefanowski: 40–50% 50–60% 60–70% 70–80% Tie: 40–50%
Governor before election
Dannel Malloy
Democratic
Elected Governor
Ned Lamont
Democratic

The 2018 Connecticut gubernatorial election took place on November 6, 2018, to elect the next governor and lieutenant governor of Connecticut, concurrently with the election of Connecticut's Class I U.S. Senate seat, as well as other elections to the United States Senate in other states, elections to the United States House of Representatives, and various state and local elections.

As Connecticut does not have gubernatorial term limits, incumbent Democratic governor Dannel Malloy was eligible to run for a third term, but declined to do so. After the resignation of Kansas governor Sam Brownback in January 2018, Malloy became the most unpopular governor in the United States. The general election was between 2006 Democratic U.S. Senate nominee Ned Lamont, and Republican financial executive Bob Stefanowski. Independent candidate and former Republican Oz Griebel has been called a spoiler candidate for Stefanowski, earning 3.89% of the vote. Lamont was re-elected governor in 2022 in a rematch with Stefanowski.

== Democratic primary ==
=== Governor ===
==== Democratic nominee ====
- Ned Lamont, former Greenwich selectman, nominee for the U.S. Senate in 2006 and candidate for governor of Connecticut in 2010 (endorsed by the state party)

==== Lost the Democratic primary ====
- Joe Ganim, mayor of Bridgeport and nominee for lieutenant governor in 1994

==== Withdrew prior to the Democratic primary ====
- Susan Bysiewicz, Secretary of the State of Connecticut from 1999 to 2011 and candidate for the U.S. Senate in 2012 (running for lieutenant governor of Connecticut; endorsed Lamont)
- Sean Connolly, former state commissioner for Veterans' Affairs (endorsed Lamont)
- Dan Drew, mayor of Middletown
- Jonathan Harris, former mayor of West Hartford and former Connecticut state senator (endorsed Lamont)
- Guy L. Smith, businessman

==== Declined ====
- Dita Bhargava, former hedge fund manager and former vice chair of the Democratic Party of Connecticut (ran for Treasurer of Connecticut)
- Luke Bronin, mayor of Hartford since 2015
- Joe Courtney, U.S. representative since 2007 (ran for reelection)
- Elizabeth Esty, U.S. representative since 2013 (retiring)
- Toni Harp, Mayor of New Haven since 2013 (endorsed Lamont)
- Jim Himes, U.S. representative since 2009 (ran for reelection)
- George Jepsen, Attorney General of Connecticut since 2011 (retired)
- Edward M. Kennedy Jr., state senator and member of the Kennedy family (retired)
- John Larson, U.S. representative since 1999 (ran for reelection; endorsed Lamont)
- Kevin Lembo, State Comptroller of Connecticut since 2011 (ran for reelection)
- Martin Looney, state senator, president pro tempore of the Connecticut Senate
- Dan Malloy, governor of Connecticut since 2011 (retired)
- Rudy Marconi, Ridgefield first selectman
- Chris Mattei, attorney and former federal prosecutor (ran for attorney general)
- Nancy Wyman, lieutenant governor of Connecticut since 2011 (retired)

==== Primary endorsements ====
Susan Bysiewicz (withdrew)

State legislators

- Josh Elliott, state representative

Mayors and other municipal leaders

- Saud Anwar, South Windsor mayor
- Patrice Granatosky, Groton mayor
- Matthew Knickerbocker, Bethel first selectman
- Ronald McDaniel, Montville mayor
- Bonnie Reemsnyder, Old Lyme first selectwoman
- Don Trinks, Windsor mayor
- Ellen Zoppo-Sassu, Bristol mayor
Sean Connolly (withdrew)

State legislators

- David Arconti, state representative
- Pat Boyd, state representative
- Steve Cassano, state senator
- Cathy Osten, state senator
Jonathan Harris (withdrew)

Statewide officials

- Kevin Sullivan, former lieutenant governor

State legislators

- Beth Bye, state senator
- Mike Demicco, state representative
- Andy Fleischmann, state representative
- Ed Gomes, state senator
- Susan Johnson, state representative
- Tim Larson, state senator
- Linda Orange, state representative
- Kevin Ryan, state representative
- Derek Slap, state representative
- Joe Verrengia, state representative

Mayors and other municipal leaders

- Shari Cantor, West Hartford mayor
- Kevin Scarpati, Meriden mayor
- Ted Shafer, Burlington first selectman
Ned Lamont

U.S. executive branch officials

- Joe Biden, former vice president of the United States
- Barack Obama, former president of the United States

Withdrawn candidates

- Susan Bysiewicz, former Secretary of the State of Connecticut (running mate)

U.S. representatives

- Joe Courtney, U.S. representative from Connecticut's 2nd congressional district
- Rosa DeLauro, U.S. representative from Connecticut's 3rd congressional district
- John Larson, U.S. representative from Connecticut's 1st congressional district

Statewide officials

- George Jepsen, Connecticut Attorney General

State legislators

- Juan Candelaria, current state representative of New Haven
- Michelle Cook, current state representative of Torrington
- Michael DiMassa, current state representative of New Haven
- Jonathan Harris, former state senator and West Hartford mayor
- Edward M. Kennedy Jr., current state senator of Guilford
- Martin Looney, current pro tempore of the Senate, New Haven
- Ellen Scalettar, former state representative of Woodbridge and former Woodbridge first selectman
- Sean Scanlon, current state representative of Guilford

Party leaders

- Kevin Comer, chairman of Washington Democratic Town Committee
- Karen Jarmoc, member of Democratic State Central Committee
- Barbara Reynolds, member of Democratic State Central Committee
- Steven Sheinberg, chairman of Fairfield Democratic Town Committee
- Audrey Tyson, member of Democratic State Central Committee

Newspapers and magazines

- Hartford Courant

Mayors and other municipal leaders

- Ben Blake, Milford mayor
- Shari Cantor, West Hartford mayor
- Toni Harp, New Haven mayor
- Beth Heller, Woodbridge first selectman
- Marcia Leclerc, East Hartford mayor
- Neil O'Leary, Waterbury mayor
- Curtis Read, Bridgewater first selectman
- Nancy Rossi, West Haven mayor
- Eva Magnuszewski, Common Council president of New Britain
- Liz Brown, chairperson of Board of Education of Waterbury
- John Burdick, member of the New Hartford, Connecticut Economic Development Commission (since 2017) and candidate for New Hartford first selectman (Republican)

2018 candidates for office

- Amanda Webster, Democratic nominee for Connecticut representative from the 62nd District

Labor unions

- Connecticut AFL-CIO

==== Results ====
Results by county Lamont: 70–80%; 80–90%; >90%

Results by municipality Lamont: 50–60%; 60–70%; 70–80%; 80–90%; >90%; Ganim: 50–60%

Democratic primary results
Party	Candidate	Votes	%
Democratic	Ned Lamont	172,024	81.2
Democratic	Joe Ganim	39,913	18.8
Total votes		211,937	100.0

=== Lieutenant governor ===
==== Democratic nominee ====
- Susan Bysiewicz, former Secretary of the State of Connecticut and candidate for the U.S. Senate in 2012 (endorsed by the state party)

==== Lost the Democratic primary ====
- Eva Bermúdez Zimmerman, activist

==== Withdrew ====
- Liz Linehan, state representative
- Drew Marzullo, Greenwich selectman
- Charlie Stallworth, state representative

==== Results ====
Results by county Bysiewicz: 50–60%; 60–70%

Results by municipality Bysiewicz: 50–60%; 60–70%; 70–80%; Zimmerman: 50–60%

Democratic primary results
Party	Candidate	Votes	%
Democratic	Susan Bysiewicz	129,928	62.2
Democratic	Eva Bermúdez Zimmerman	79,021	37.8
Total votes		208,949	100.0

== Republican primary ==
=== Governor ===
==== Republican nominee ====
- Bob Stefanowski, financial executive

==== Lost the Republican primary ====
- Tim Herbst, former first selectman of Trumbull and nominee for state treasurer in 2014
- Stephen A. Obsitnik, businessman and nominee for CT-04 in 2012
- David Stemerman, businessman
- Mark Boughton, mayor of Danbury, nominee for lieutenant governor in 2010 and candidate for governor in 2014 (endorsed by the state party)

==== Eliminated at convention ====
- Mike Handler, Stamford Director of Administration
- Mark Lauretti, mayor of Shelton and candidate for governor and lieutenant governor in 2014 (endorsed Stefanowski)
- Peter Lumaj, attorney and nominee for secretary of state in 2014 (endorsed Stefanowski)
- Prasad Srinivasan, state representative (endorsed Herbst)
- David M. Walker, former United States Comptroller General and candidate for lieutenant governor in 2014 (endorsed Stefanowski)

==== Withdrew prior to convention ====
- Erin Stewart, mayor of New Britain (ran for lieutenant governor)
- Peter Thalheim, attorney and builder
- Joe Visconti, former West Hartford councilman and independent candidate for governor in 2014 (ran for U.S. Senate)

==== Declined ====
- Toni Boucher, state senator
- Len Fasano, state senator, president pro tempore of the Connecticut Senate
- Tom Foley, former U.S. Ambassador to Ireland and nominee for governor in 2010 and 2014
- Tony Hwang, state senator
- Rob Kane, Auditor of Public Accounts and former state senator
- Themis Klarides, Minority Leader of the Connecticut House of Representatives
- Joe Markley, state senator (running for lieutenant governor)
- John P. McKinney, former state senator and candidate for governor in 2014

==== Convention ====
The Republican statewide nominating convention was held May 11–12, 2018 at Foxwoods Resort Casino in Ledyard, Connecticut.

Under the rules established by the convention, any candidate not receiving at least eight percent of the vote would be eliminated in the first round of voting. In the second round of voting, candidates not receiving 15 percent of the vote would be eliminated. In all subsequent rounds of voting, the candidate with the fewest votes would be eliminated, regardless of percentage. Voting would continue until one candidate receives 50 percent plus one of all votes cast.

=== Results at the convention ===
Round	Mark Boughton		Tim Herbst		Steve Obsitnik		Peter Lumaj		Mark Lauretti		David M. Walker		Prasad Srinivasan		Mike Handler	
1	277	24.4%	213	18.8%	117	10.3%	167	14.7%	119	10.5%	104	9.2%	90	7.9%	46	4.1%
2	408	36.3%	319	28.4%	198	17.6%	161	14.3%	26	2.3%	13	1.2%				
3	557	50.1%	454	40.9%	100	9.0%										

==== Primary endorsements ====
Mark Boughton

Individuals

- Pete Bass, New Milford mayor
- Mitch Bolinsky, state representative
- Bill Buckbee, state representative
- Vincent Candelora, state representative
- Elinor Carbone, Torrington mayor
- Daniel Champagne, Vernon mayor
- Robert Chatfield, Prospect mayor
- Holly Cheeseman, state representative
- Anthony D'Amelio, state representative
- William Duff, state representative
- Adam Dunsby, state representative
- Michael Fedele, former lieutenant governor of Connecticut
- Michael Ferguson, state representative
- Paul Formica, state senator
- Laura Francis, Durham first selectman
- Carol Hall, state representative
- Stephen Harding, state representative
- Barbara Henry, Roxbury first selectwoman
- Laura Hoydick, Stratford mayor
- Dan Jerram, New Hartford first selectman
- David Labriola, state representative
- Jesse MacLachlan, state representative
- Jeff Manville, Southbury first selectman
- Michael McLachlan, state senator
- Lizz Millardo, Haddam first selectwoman
- Kurt Miller, Seymour first selectman
- Michael Molgano, former state representative
- Mark Nickerson, East Lyme first selectman
- Brian Ohler, state representative
- Leo Paul, Litchfield first selectman
- Rosa Rebimbas, state representative
- Richard Smith, state representative
- Lori Spielman, Ellington first selectman
- J. P. Sredzinski, state representative
- Scott Storms, state representative
- George Temple, Oxford first selectman
- Christopher Tymniak, Fairfield selectman
- Fred Wilms, state representative
- Kevin Witkos, state senator
- Terrie Wood, state representative

Organizations

- Connecticut GOP
Tim Herbst

Individuals

- David S. Cassetti, Ansonia mayor
- Craig C. Fishbein, state representative
- Mike France, state representative
- Michael Freda, North Haven first selectman
- Ben McGorty, state representative
- John P. McKinney, former state senator
- Richard A. Moccia, former Norwalk mayor
- Michael Pavia, former Stamford mayor
- Robert Siegrist, state representative
- Kevin Skulczyck, state representative
- Prasad Srinivasan, state representative
- Gregory Stokes, state representative

Organizations

- Connecticut Property Owners Alliance
Steve Obsitnik

Individuals

- Dan Debicella, former state senator
- Rick Hayes, Putnam selectman
- Kevin Kerttula, Killingly town councilman
- Jason Perillo, state representative
- Peter Tesei, Greenwich first selectman
Bob Stefanowski

Individuals

- Tyrell Brown, Middletown Planning and Zoning Commissioner
- Steve Forbes, businessman
- Edward Ford Jr., Middletown Board of Education member
- Noreen Kokoruda, Madison State Representative
- Arthur Laffer, Reagan Economic Policy Advisory Board member (1981-89)
- Mark Lauretti, Shelton mayor
- Mike Ludwick, Enfield mayor
- Peter Lumaj, candidate for Connecticut Secretary of State, 2014
- Len Suzio, Meriden State Senator
- David M. Walker, former U.S. Comptroller General (1998-2008)
- Dave Yaccarino, North Haven State Representative
David Stemerman

Individuals

- Tony Hwang, state senator

Newspapers

- Hartford Courant
Mike Handler (eliminated)

Individuals

- Melissa Joan Hart, actress
Mark Lauretti (eliminated)

State legislators

- Dan Debicella, state senator (former)
- Jason Perillo, state representative

Mayors and other municipal leaders

- Rich Dziekan, Derby mayor
- Kurt Miller, Seymour first selectman
- Ed Mone, Thomaston first selectman

Republican Town Committee leaders

- Mike Barnes, chairman, New Milford RTC
- Bill Paecht, chairman, Seymour RTC
- Anthony Simonetti, chairman, Shelton RTC
Peter Lumaj (eliminated)

Individuals

- Anne Dauphinais, state representative
- Doug Dubitsky, state representative
- Mike France, state representative
- John Fusco, state representative
- Joe Markley, state senator and candidate for lieutenant governor
- Henri Martin, state senator
- Dave Merchant, mayor of Plymouth
- Rob Sampson, state representative
Prasad Srinivasan (eliminated)

State legislators

- State Rep. Sam Belsito (R-53rd District) of Tolland
- State Rep. Tom Delnicki (R-14th District) of South Windsor
- State Rep. Bill Simanski (R-62nd District) of Granby
- State Rep. Mark Tweedie (R-13th District) of Manchester

Local officials

- Stewart "Chip" Beckett, member, Glastonbury Town Council
- Tim Devanney, member, Town of Manchester board of directors
- William T. Finn, former member, Glastonbury town council
- Matthew Galligan, member, Town of Manchester board of directors
- Carolyn Mirek, member, South Windsor town council and former mayor
- Robert Morra, member, Town of Bolton board of selectmen
- George P. Norman, member, Glastonbury town council
- Donald Palmer, member, Town of Manchester ways and means committee
- Michael T. Zelasky, chairman, Lisbon board of finance

State Central Committee

- Michael FitzPatrick (4th senatorial District) of Glastonbury
- Louis Spadaccini (4th senatorial District) of Manchester

Republican town committee leaders

- John Deeb, chairman, Manchester RTC
- Rodney Fournier, chairman, Bolton RTC
- Ken Hjulstrom, chairman, Marlborough RTC
- Robert Ike, chairman, Bloomfield RTC
- Robert Lynn, chairman, Glastonbury RTC
- Allan Spotts, chairman, Cromwell RTC
- John Tanski, first vice chair, Glastonbury RTC
Erin Stewart (withdrew)

Individuals

- Tony Guglielmo, state senator
- Nancy Johnson, former U.S. representative

==== Polling ====
Poll source	Date(s) administered	Sample size	Margin of error	Mark Boughton	Tim Herbst	Steve Obsitnik	Bob Stefanowski	David Stemerman	Undecided
Tremont Public Advisors	August 7–9, 2018	1,151	± 3.0%	32%	16%	11%	22%	17%	3%
Tremont Public Advisors	July 18–20, 2018	1,006	± 3.0%	34%	15%	12%	20%	15%	5%
McLaughlin & Associates (R-Stefanowski)	July 21–23, 2018	400	± 4.9%	18%	11%	4%	29%	17%	21%

Hypothetical polling

Poll source	Date(s) administered	Sample size	Margin of error	Mark Boughton	Mike Handler	Tim Herbst	Mark Lauretti	Peter Lumaj	Steve Obsitnik	Prasad Srinivasan	Bob Stefanowski	David Stemerman	Erin Stewart	Dave Walker	Undecided
McLaughlin & Associates (R-Stefanowski)	May 4–6, 2018	400	± 4.9%	7%	2%	3%	4%	2%	2%	3%	33%	2%	11%	3%	30%

==== Results ====
Republican primary results by municipality. Shades of red denote win for Stefanowski, orange for Boughton, purple for Stemerman, green for Herbst, and teal for Obsitnik.

Republican primary results by county. Shades of red denote win for Stefanowski. Shades of green denote win for Boughton.
Map legend
- Stefanowski—30–40%
- Stefanowski—<30%
- Boughton—<30%
- Boughton—30–40%

Republican primary results
Party	Candidate	Votes	%
Republican	Bob Stefanowski	42,119	29.4
Republican	Mark D. Boughton	30,505	21.3
Republican	David Stemerman	26,276	18.3
Republican	Tim Herbst	25,144	17.6
Republican	Steve Obsitnik	19,151	13.4
Total votes		143,195	100.0

=== Lieutenant governor ===
==== Republican nominee ====
- Joe Markley, state senator

==== Lost the Republican primary ====
- Jayme Stevenson, Darien first selectman
- Erin Stewart, mayor of New Britain

==== Withdrew ====
- Ann Brookes, attorney
- Peter Tesei, Greenwich first selectman

==== Endorsements ====
Joe Markley

Newspapers and other media

- National Review
Erin Stewart

Newspapers

- Hartford Courant

==== Results ====
Republican primary results
Party	Candidate	Votes	%
Republican	Joe Markley	65,702	47.6
Republican	Erin Stewart	45,262	32.8
Republican	Jayme Stevenson	27,139	19.7
Total votes		138,103	100.0

== Independent ==
=== Candidates ===
==== Declared ====
- Oz Griebel, businessman and Republican candidate for governor in 2010
  - Running mate: Monte Frank, former president of the Connecticut Bar Association.

==== Declined ====
- Joe Scarborough, television personality and former Republican U.S. representative from Florida

==== Withdrew ====
- Micah Welintukonis, former Coventry town councilman and Army veteran

=== Endorsements ===
Oz Griebel

Organizations

- Serve America Movement

== General election ==
=== Endorsements ===
Bob Stefanowski (R)

Individuals

- Tyrell Brown, Middletown Planning and Zoning Commissioner
- Steve Forbes, businessman
- Edward Ford Jr., Middletown Board of Education member
- Jim Grasso, son of former Connecticut governor Ella Grasso
- Noreen Kokoruda, Madison state representative
- Arthur Laffer, Reagan Economic Policy Advisory Board member (1981-89)
- Mark Lauretti, Shelton mayor
- Mike Ludwick, Enfield mayor
- Peter Lumaj, candidate for Connecticut Secretary of State, 2014
- David Stemerman, businessman
- Len Suzio, Meriden state senator
- Donald Trump, president of the United States
- David M. Walker, former U.S. Comptroller General (1998-2008)
- Dave Yaccarino, North Haven state representative

Organizations

- Connecticut Association of Realtors
- Independent Electrical Contractors of New England
- Independent Party of Connecticut
- National Federation of Independent Business

Newspapers

- Greenwich Sentinel
- National Review
- New York Post
- The Wall Street Journal
- Waterbury Republican-American
Ned Lamont (D)

Federal officials

- Joe Biden, former vice president of the United States
- Richard Blumenthal, U.S. senator (D-CT)
- Joe Courtney, U.S. representative from Connecticut's 2nd congressional district
- Rosa DeLauro, U.S. representative from Connecticut's 3rd congressional district
- Kamala Harris, U.S. senator (D-CA)
- Jim Himes, U.S. representative from Connecticut's 4th congressional district
- John Larson, U.S. representative from Connecticut's 1st congressional district
- Chris Murphy, U.S. senator (D-CT)
- Barack Obama, former president of the United States

Individuals

- Paul Bucha, foreign policy adviser to Barack Obama's 2008 presidential campaign

Statewide officials

- George Jepsen, Connecticut Attorney General

State legislators

- Juan Candelaria, state representative of New Haven
- Michelle Cook, state representative of Torrington
- Michael DiMassa, state representative of New Haven
- Jonathan Harris, former state senator and West Hartford mayor
- Edward M. Kennedy Jr., state senator of Guilford
- Martin Looney, pro tempore of the Senate, New Haven
- Ellen Scalettar, former state representative of Woodbridge and former Woodbridge first selectman
- Sean Scanlon, state representative of Guilford

Party leaders

- Donna Brazile, former chairwoman of the Democratic National Committee
- Kevin Comer, chairman of Washington Democratic town committee
- Karen Jarmoc, member of Democratic state central committee
- Barbara Reynolds, member of Democratic state central committee
- Steven Sheinberg, chairman of Fairfield Democratic town committee
- Audrey Tyson, member of Democratic state central committee

Newspapers and magazines

- Connecticut Post
- The Day
- The Hour
- The Lakeville Journal
- The News-Times
- Record-Journal
- The Stamford Advocate

Mayors and other municipal leaders

- Ben Blake, Milford mayor
- Liz Brown, chairperson of board of education of Waterbury
- John Burdick, member of the New Hartford, Connecticut Economic Development Commission (Since 2017) and candidate for New Hartford first selectman (Republican)
- Shari Cantor, West Hartford mayor
- Toni Harp, New Haven mayor
- Beth Heller, Woodbridge first selectman
- Marcia Leclerc, East Hartford mayor
- Eva Magnuszewski, Common Council president of New Britain
- Neil O'Leary, Waterbury mayor
- Curtis Read, Bridgewater first selectman
- Nancy Rossi, West Haven mayor

2018 candidates for office

- Amanda Webster, Democratic nominee for Connecticut representative from the 62nd District

Organizations

- Connecticut Against Gun Violence
- Connecticut League of Conservation Voters
- Everytown for Gun Safety
- Newtown Action Alliance
- Sierra Club of Connecticut

Labor unions

- Connecticut AFL-CIO
- Connecticut State Police Union
Oz Griebel (I)

Newspapers and magazines

- Hartford Courant

=== Fundraising ===
Campaign finance reports as of January 10, 2019
Candidate	Raised	Spent	Cash on hand
Ned Lamont (D)	$15,096,464	$15,909,903	$410
Bob Stefenowski (R)	$3,226,116	$6,535,871	$209
Oz Griebel (I)	$199,606	$503,305	$1,428
Source: Connecticut State Elections Enforcement Commission

=== Debates ===
Dates	Location	Lamont	Stefanowski	Griebel	Link
October 18, 2018	Hartford, Connecticut	Participant	Participant	Participant	Full debate - C-SPAN
October 30, 2018	New Haven, Connecticut	Participant	Participant	Participant	Full debate - C-SPAN

=== Predictions ===
Source	Ranking	As of
The Cook Political Report	Tossup	October 26, 2018
The Washington Post	Tossup	November 5, 2018
FiveThirtyEight	Likely D	November 5, 2018
Rothenberg Political Report	Lean D	November 1, 2018
Sabato's Crystal Ball	Lean D	November 5, 2018
RealClearPolitics	Tossup	November 4, 2018
Daily Kos	Lean D	November 5, 2018
Fox News (Note: The Fox News Midterm Power Rankings uniquely does not contain a category for Safe/Solid races)	Likely D	November 5, 2018
Politico	Lean D	November 5, 2018
Governing	Lean D	November 5, 2018

=== Polling ===
Poll source	Date(s) administered	Sample size	Margin of error	Ned Lamont (D)	Bob Stefanowski (R)	Oz Griebel (I)	Other	Undecided
Gravis Marketing	October 30 – November 1, 2018	681	± 3.8%	46%	37%	9%	–	8%
Sacred Heart University	October 29–31, 2018	500	± 4.3%	38%	40%	9%	1%	12%
Emerson College	October 27–29, 2018	780	± 3.7%	46%	39%	10%	0% (Note: Rod Hanscomb (L) with 0%)	5%
Quinnipiac University	October 22–28, 2018	1,201	± 4.0%	47%	43%	7%	0%	4%
Sacred Heart University	October 13–17, 2018	501	± 4.3%	40%	36%	8%	1%	15%
Public Policy Polling (D-Change Course CT PAC)	October 8–9, 2018	828	–	43%	38%	–	–	19%
Quinnipiac University	October 3–8, 2018	767	± 5.0%	47%	39%	11%	0%	3%
Sacred Heart University	September 12–17, 2018	501	± 4.3%	43%	37%	–	4%	16%
Gravis Marketing	August 24–27, 2018	606	± 4.0%	49%	40%	–	–	12%
Quinnipiac University	August 16–21, 2018	1,029	± 3.9%	46%	33%	4%	2% (Note: Rod Hanscomb (L) with 1%, other with 1%)	14%
Quinnipiac University	August 16–21, 2018	1,029	± 3.9%	53%	37%	–	–	6%
Sacred Heart University	August 16–21, 2018	502	± 4.3%	41%	37%	–	6%	17%

Hypothetical polling

with Ned Lamont and Mark Boughton

Poll source	Date(s) administered	Sample size	Margin of error	Ned Lamont (D)	Mark Boughton (R)	Undecided
Tremont Public Advisors	May 3–5, 2018	550	± 4.5%	50%	40%	11%

with Ned Lamont and Erin Stewart

Poll source	Date(s) administered	Sample size	Margin of error	Ned Lamont (D)	Erin Stewart (R)	Undecided
Tremont Public Advisors	May 3–5, 2018	550	± 4.5%	44%	46%	10%

with Susan Bysiewicz and Erin Stewart

Poll source	Date(s) administered	Sample size	Margin of error	Susan Bysiewicz (D)	Erin Stewart (R)	Undecided
Tremont Public Advisors	May 3–5, 2018	550	± 4.5%	40%	50%	10%

with Susan Bysiewicz and Mark Boughton

Poll source	Date(s) administered	Sample size	Margin of error	Susan Bysiewicz (D)	Mark Boughton (R)	Undecided
Tremont Public Advisors	May 3–5, 2018	550	± 4.5%	42%	47%	11%

with generic Democrat and Republican

Poll source	Date(s) administered	Sample size	Margin of error	Generic Democrat	Generic Republican	Undecided
Tremont Public Advisors	May 3–5, 2018	550	± 4.5%	43%	50%	7%

=== Results ===
Connecticut's gubernatorial election, 2018
Party	Candidate	Votes	%	±%
Democratic	Ned Lamont	676,649	48.10%	−0.36%
Working Families	Ned Lamont	17,861	1.27%	−1.00%
Total	Ned Lamont	694,510	49.37%	-1.36%
Republican	Bob Stefanowski	624,750	44.41%	−1.71%
Independent Party	Bob Stefanowski	25,388	1.80%	−0.24%
Total	Bob Stefanowski	650,138	46.21%	−1.95%
Griebel-Frank for CT Party	Oz Griebel	54,741	3.89%	N/A
Libertarian	Rod Hanscomb	6,086	0.43%	N/A
Amigo Constitution Liberty	Mark Greenstein	1,254	0.09%	N/A
Write-in	Lee Whitnum	74	0.01%	N/A
Total votes		1,406,803	100.00%	N/A
Democratic hold				

==== By county ====
Lamont won four of eight counties, while Stefenowski won the other four.

County	Ned Lamont Democratic		Bob Stefenowski Republican		Other parties Independent		Total votes cast		
County	Fairfield	188,334	53.01%	160,641	45.22%	6,283	Total votes cast	1.77%	355,258
Hartford	179,182	51.74%	144,218	41.64%	22,930	6.62%	346,330		
Litchfield	32,125	37.61%	49,280	57.69%	4,015	4.70%	85,420		
Middlesex	36,483	45.78%	38,678	48.54%	4,524	5.68%	79,685		
New Haven	160,406	49.39%	153,865	47.38%	10,485	3.23%	324,756		
New London	50,417	47.38%	49,364	46.39%	6,625	6.23%	106,406		
Tolland	29,992	45.13%	31,882	47.98%	4,576	6.89%	66,450		
Windham	17,571	41.42%	22,210	52.35%	2,643	6.23%	42,424		
Total	694,510	49.37%	650,138	46.22%	62,081	4.41%	1,406,729		

Counties that flipped from Democratic to Republican

- Middlesex (largest town: Middletown)

==== By congressional district ====
Lamont won three of five congressional districts, while Stefenowski won two, both of which were held by Democrats.

District	Ned Lamont Democratic		Bob Stefenowski Republican		Other parties Independent		Total votes cast	Representative
District	#	%	#	%	#	%	Total votes cast	Representative
1st	146,577	52.21%	115,799	41.25%	18,375	6.54%	280,751	John B. Larson
2nd	131,943	44.67%	145,057	49.11%	18,361	6.22%	295,361	Joe Courtney
3rd	142,570	51.64%	124,877	45.23%	8,634	3.13%	276,081	Rosa DeLauro
4th	149,528	53.50%	125,583	44.93%	4,395	1.57%	279,506	Jim Himes
5th	123,892	45.03%	138,822	50.46%	12,390	4.50%	275,104	Elizabeth Esty
Totals	694,510	49.37%	650,138	46.22%	62,155	4.41%	1,406,803	

== See also ==
- 2018 United States gubernatorial elections
