= Connecticut's 114th House of Representatives district =

American legislative district

Connecticut's 114th State House of Representatives district
Representative
Mary Welander; D

Connecticut's 114th House of Representatives district elects one member of the Connecticut House of Representatives. It encompasses parts of Derby, Orange, and Woodbridge. It has been represented by Democrat Mary Welander since 2021.

== List of representatives ==
Representative	Party	Years	District home	Note
John D. Prete	Democratic	1967 – 1971	West Haven	Later elected to the State Senate
Robert A. Johnson	Democratic	1971 – 1973	West Haven	
John D. McHugh	Republican	1973 – 1974	Orange	Redistricted from the 117th District
Wilda Hamerman	Democratic	1974 – 1977	Orange	
William E. Taber Jr.	Republican	1977 – 1979	Orange	
Patrick B. O'Sullivan III	Democratic	1979 – 1981	Orange	
Alan Schlesinger	Republican	1981 – 1993	Derby	Later served as Mayor of Derby
Ellen Scalettar	Democratic	1993 – 1999	Woodbridge	
Themis Klarides	Republican	1999 – 2021	Derby	Served as Minority Leader of the Connecticut House of Representatives
Mary Welander	Democratic	2021 – present	Orange	

== Recent elections ==
=== 2020 ===
2020 Connecticut State House of Representatives election, District 114
Party	Candidate	Votes	%
Democratic	Mary Welander	7,081	50.75
Republican	Dan DeBarba	6,309	45.22
Working Families	Mary Welander	283	2.03
Independent Party	Dan DeBarba	279	2.00
Total votes		13,952	100.00
Democratic gain from Republican			

=== 2018 ===
2018 Connecticut House of Representatives election, District 114
Party	Candidate	Votes	%
Republican	Themis Klarides (Incumbent)	6,249	54.4
Democratic	Mary Welander	5,246	45.6
Total votes		11,495	100.00
Republican hold			

=== 2016 ===
2016 Connecticut House of Representatives election, District 114
Party	Candidate	Votes	%
Republican	Themis Klarides (Incumbent)	8,993	85.14
Working Families	Aldon Hynes	1,569	14.86
Total votes		11,495	100.00
Republican hold			

=== 2014 ===
2014 Connecticut House of Representatives election, District 114
Party	Candidate	Votes	%
Republican	Themis Klarides (Incumbent)	5,487	62.4
Democratic	Aldon Hynes	2,759	31.4
Independent Party	Themis Klarides (Incumbent)	362	4.1
Working Families	Aldon Hynes	186	2.1
Total votes		8,794	100.00
Republican hold			

=== 2012 ===
2012 Connecticut House of Representatives election, District 114
Party	Candidate	Votes	%
Republican	Themis Klarides (Incumbent)	7,472	63.9
Democratic	Aldon Hynes	4,225	36.1
Total votes		11,697	100.00
Republican hold			
