= Ruth N. Edelman =

American politician

Member of the Wyoming House of Representatives from the Sheridan County district
- In office 1939–1941 Serving with Basil Dean, George Messick, Robert J. Thirwell

Personal details
- Party: Republican
- Occupation: Politician

Ruth Nelson Edelman was an American politician from Sheridan, Wyoming, who served a single term in the Wyoming House of Representatives. She was elected in 1938, and represented Sheridan County from 1939 to 1941 (Note: According to the Wyoming Legislature, Edelman only served in 1939.) as a Republican in the 25th Wyoming Legislature.

== See also ==
- Della Herbst, American politician who also represented the Sheridan County district in the Wyoming House of Representatives

== Notes ==
Wyoming House of Representatives
Preceded by —	Member of the Wyoming House of Representatives from the Sheridan County district 1939–1941; Served alongside: Basil Dean, George Messick, Robert J. Thirwell	Succeeded by —
