= Ellen Scalettar =

American politician

Member of the Connecticut House of Representatives from the 114th district
- In office 1993 – January 4, 1999
- Preceded by: Alan Schlesinger
- Succeeded by: Themis Klarides

Personal details
- Born: New York, U.S.
- Party: Democratic
- Education: City College of New York (BA) University of Maryland School of Law (JD)

Ellen Scalettar is an American lawyer and politician who served in the Connecticut House of Representatives from 1993 to 1999, representing the 114th district.

Scalettar studied at City College of New York and at University of Maryland School of Law, where she earned her Juris Doctor. Prior to her involvement in Connecticut politics, Scalettar worked as a private practice lawyer and as counsel to the Environmental Protection Agency.

== Political career ==
In 1992, Scalettar was elected to represent the 114th district in the Connecticut House of Representatives after her predecessor, Alan Schlesinger, chose to run for mayor of Derby, Connecticut. She began her first term in 1993 and served until 1999.

Scalettar remained active in state and local politics following her service in the Connecticut House of Representatives. From 1999 to 2000, she was an assistant Connecticut State Treasurer. In 2008, she was elected to the Board of Selectmen in Woodbridge, Connecticut, and in 2013, she was elected first selectwoman. She served two terms in the position before announcing in 2017 that she would not run for a third term and planned to teach at Yale Law School.

== Personal life ==
She is Jewish.
