= Alan Schlesinger =

American politician (born 1958)

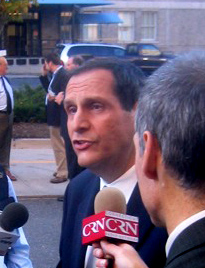
- Schlesinger after a U.S. Senate debate on October 18, 2006.

Mayor of Derby, Connecticut
- In office January 3, 1994 – January 1, 1998
- Preceded by: Gino S. DiMauro Jr.
- Succeeded by: Marc J. Garofalo

Member of the Connecticut House of Representatives from the 114th district
- In office January 1981 – January 1993
- Preceded by: Patrick B. O'Sullivan III
- Succeeded by: Ellen Scalettar

Personal details
- Born: January 4, 1958 (age 68)
- Party: Republican
- Education: University of Pennsylvania (BS); University of Connecticut (JD)
- Profession: Attorney

Alan Schlesinger (born January 4, 1958) is an American attorney, entrepreneur, and Republican politician. He has previously served as the mayor of Derby, Connecticut from 1994 to 1998 and as a member of the Connecticut House of Representatives from 1981 to 1993. He campaigned unsuccessfully for the Republican nomination in Connecticut's 5th congressional district in 1984, 1990, and 1998.

Schlesinger was the unsuccessful Republican nominee for the United States Senate in 2006, finishing third behind third-party winner Joe Lieberman and Democrat Ned Lamont. After his defeat, Schlesinger moved to Florida and considered running for Congress from there in 2008 and 2010. In 2013, he announced that he was running in Florida's 18th congressional district in the 2014 elections; however, he finished in second place for the Republican nomination behind Carl Domino.

== Early career ==
After graduating from Amity Regional High School, which serves Orange, Woodbridge, and Bethany, Schlesinger earned a bachelor's degree from the Wharton School of the University of Pennsylvania in Economics, and later a J.D. from the University of Connecticut School of Law. He then entered private law practice, starting the law firm of Schlesinger and Barbara in Shelton. From 1979 to 1981, he was a member of the Board of Selectmen of Orange before his election as a State Representative. He would serve six terms in the Connecticut House of Representatives. In 1992, instead of seeking re-election to his state House seat, Schlesinger sought the Republican nomination for the 17th Senate district. Although he won the party endorsement at the district convention on July 16, he lost the Republican primary to public relations consultant Richard Bisi 47-53%. Bisi then went on to lose the general election against Democrat nominee Joe Crisco.

Schlesinger was then elected as mayor of Derby in 1993, defeating incumbent Mayor Gino S. DiMauro Jr. He served in that capacity from 1994 until 1998. He chose not to run for re-election in 1997 and was succeeded by Democrat Marc J. Garofalo. Schlesinger ran against Garofalo in 1999 but was defeated. He ran unsuccessfully for the Republican Congressional nomination from the Fifth District three times: in 1984 (defeated by then State Rep. John G. Rowland), 1990 (defeated by then Waterbury Alderman Gary Franks), and 1998 (defeated by then State Senator Mark Nielsen). Both Rowland and Franks went on to win election to the Congressional seat, and Nielsen became counsel to Massachusetts Governor Mitt Romney after two unsuccessful attempts to win the seat.

== 2006 U.S. Senate campaign ==
In April 2006, Schlesinger announced his intention to run for the U.S. Senate seat held by Joe Lieberman of the Democratic Party, with a pledge to spend $500,000 of his personal funds on the campaign. Schlesinger received strong criticism for his gambling at Connecticut casinos under the alias Alan Gold. He was accused of using the alias to avoid detection as a card counter. Schlesinger maintained that he only used the alias to protect his privacy as a public official. Card counting is not an illegal activity but many casinos exercise their right to remove card counters from their businesses. Many contended that the scandal would jeopardize Schlesinger's Senate campaign, and fellow Republicans, such as Governor of Connecticut Jodi Rell, suggested that he withdraw. State party chairman George Gallo said he felt Schlesinger "cleared the air" after he gave a press conference after the story broke, and said that he had not asked Schlesinger to step aside.

On July 21, the Hartford Courant reported Schlesinger had been sued twice by New Jersey casinos for gambling debts but had settled out of court, paying back both debts with interest. He supports a campaign program of immigration, tax, social security, Medicare, and spending reform. He self-described as a moderate conservative, and among other issue stances, expressed his opposition to affirmative action and amnesty for illegal immigrants. While claiming himself to be pro-choice, he supported mandatory parental notification before a minor can have an abortion. Schlesinger said that he would have supported the United States invasion of Iraq in 2003 but that by now he supported pushing the Iraqi government to take over the military operations. He said that he can reach out to independents, as he did to win in Derby, a city where Republicans were outnumbered 4 to 1. Schlesinger stated: "I've won nine elections, taken down three Democratic incumbents, and I've always been a fiscal conservative and I've always been a problem solver. For 20 years, I've been helping people at the state level and the local level."

Throughout the campaign, Schlesinger was considered a longshot, and many Republicans declined to support him, turning instead to Lieberman, who ran and ultimately won as an independent candidate after losing the Democratic Party's nomination in an August primary. Upon his victory, although he received much more support from independents and Republicans than Democrats, Lieberman announced he would caucus with the Democratic majority in the Senate in the 110th United States Congress. President George W. Bush had declined to endorse Schlesinger's candidacy. White House Press Secretary Tony Snow also stated that the Connecticut Republican Party suggested that "we not make an endorsement in that race and so we're not."

== Move to Florida ==
After his defeat, Schlesinger became involved in Florida politics. He previously lived there part-time in Palm Beach County and moved there full-time. He considered running for Florida's 22nd congressional district against Democratic incumbent Ron Klein in 2008 and for Florida's 19th congressional district in the 2010 special election to replace Democrat Robert Wexler, who had resigned, but ultimately did not run in either race. In 2013, Schlesinger announced his candidacy for Congress in Florida's 18th congressional district, centered around Palm Beach. The incumbent was Democrat Patrick Murphy.

In an article published on August 4, 2014, by George Bennett of the Palm Beach Post, Schlesinger stated that an internal poll conducted by Cherry Communications showed that 53% of potential voters in the Republican Primary were undecided at the time, so he decided to contribute $100,000 more to his campaign efforts. Schlesinger also said that the same poll showed Carl Domino remains the front-runner of the race but that he was in second place and the "only one that's within striking distance". The Republican Primary for the Florida's 18th congressional district currently featured four other candidates besides Domino and Schlesinger: Beverly Hires, Brian Lara, Calvin Turnquest and Nick Wukoson. Schlesinger finished in second place in the August 26 primary with 24% of the vote, while Domino won with 38%.

== Personal life ==
He is Jewish.

Connecticut House of Representatives
Preceded by Patrick B. O'Sullivan III	Member of the Connecticut House of Representatives from the 114th district 1981–1993	Succeeded by Ellen Scalettar
Political offices
Preceded by Gino S. DiMauro Jr.	Mayor of Derby, Connecticut; 1994–1998	Succeeded by Marc J. Garofalo
Party political offices
Preceded by Philip Giordano	Republican nominee for U.S. Senator from Connecticut (Class 1); 2006	Succeeded by Linda McMahon
