= Della Herbst =

American politician

Member of the Wyoming House of Representatives
- In office 1983–1987

Member of the Wyoming Senate
- In office 1987–1990s?

Personal details
- Born: February 26, 1935 (age 91) Plainview, Minnesota, U.S.
- Party: Democratic
- Relations: Lorraine Christianson (Sister), Vern Wilson (Brother), Ronald Wilson (Brother)
- Children: 3
- Occupation: Politician

Della Herbst (born February 26, 1935) was an American politician in the state of Wyoming. She served in the Wyoming House of Representatives and the Wyoming Senate as a member of the Democratic Party. A homemaker, she was married to John Herbst. She was also the Mayor of Sheridan, Wyoming from 1993 to 1996.

== See also ==
- Ruth N. Edelman, American politician who also represented the Sheridan County district in the Wyoming House of Representatives
