= 2022 Connecticut gubernatorial election =

- November 8, 2022
- Turnout: 57.62% (▼7.61%)
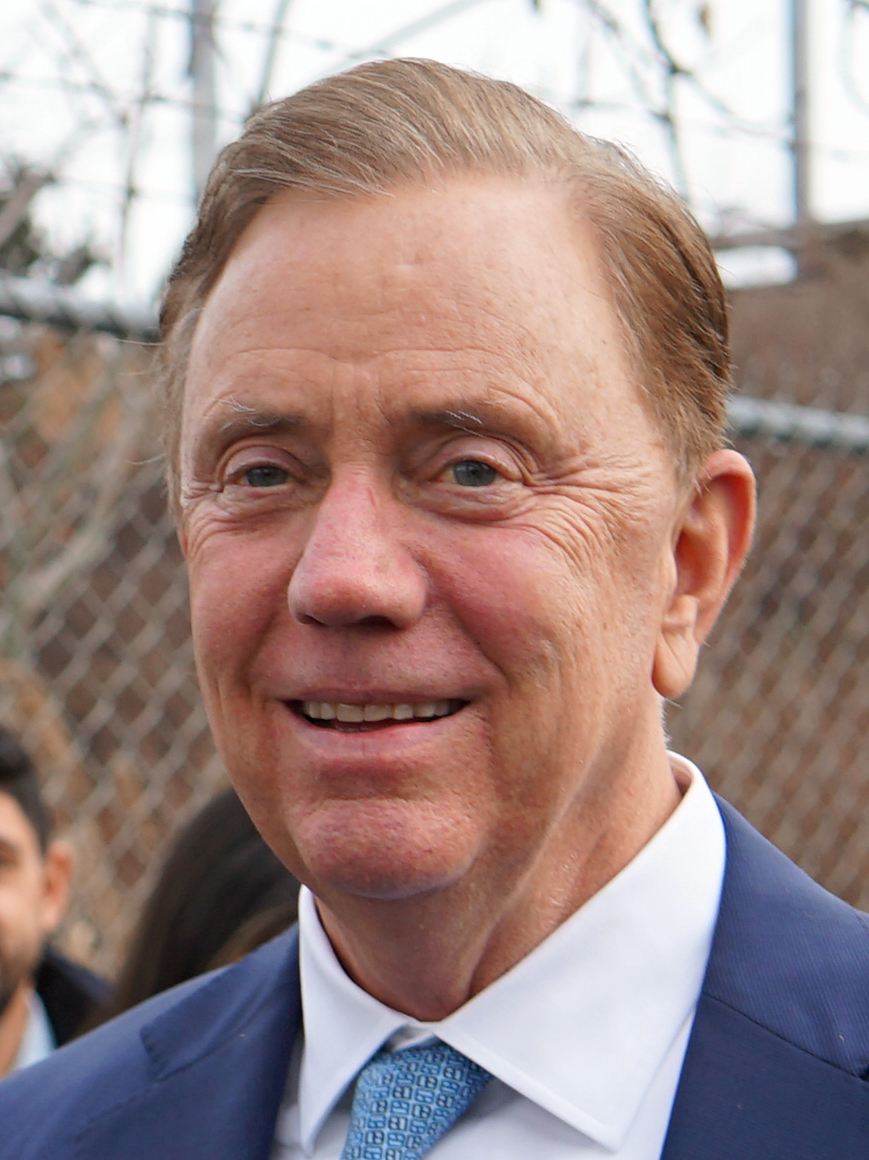

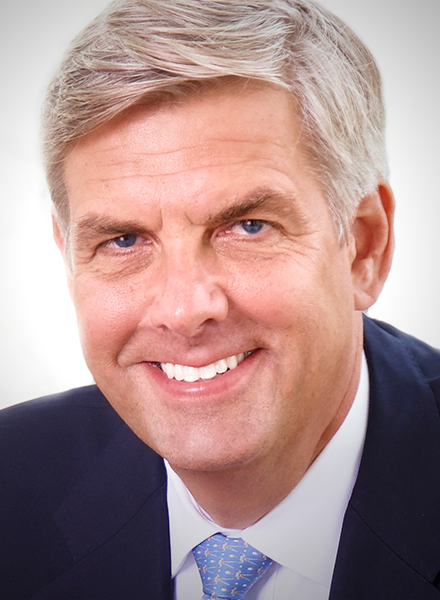
Nominee	Ned Lamont	Bob Stefanowski
Party	Democratic	Republican
Alliance	Working Families; Griebel-Frank for CT Party
Running mate	Susan Bysiewicz	Laura Devlin
Popular vote	710,186	546,209
Percentage	55.97%	43.05%
- Lamont: 40–50% 50–60% 60–70% 70–80% 80–90% Stefanowski: 40–50% 50–60% 60–70%
Governor before election
Ned Lamont
Democratic
Elected Governor
Ned Lamont
Democratic

The 2022 Connecticut gubernatorial election took place on November 8, 2022, to elect the governor of Connecticut. Incumbent Democratic Governor Ned Lamont ran for election to a second term in office. The race simultaneously took place with the election to the state's Class III Senate seat. This election featured a rematch of the previous 2018 gubernatorial election, pitting Lamont against Republican Bob Stefanowski, whom he previously defeated by 3.2% of the vote. This time Lamont won re-election by a wider margin, becoming the first Democrat to win a gubernatorial election by more than 5 points in the state since 1986.

This was the first time that Tolland County voted Democratic in a gubernatorial election since 1994, Darien since 1912, Wilton since 1884, and New Canaan since 1882.

== Democratic convention ==
=== Governor ===
==== Candidates ====
===== Nominee =====
- Ned Lamont, incumbent governor

=== Lieutenant governor ===
==== Candidates ====
===== Nominee =====
- Susan Bysiewicz, incumbent lieutenant governor

== Republican convention ==
=== Governor ===
==== Candidates ====
===== Nominee =====
- Bob Stefanowski, financial executive and nominee for governor in 2018

===== Eliminated at convention =====
- Susan Patricelli Regan

===== Declined =====
- Themis Klarides, former Minority Leader of the Connecticut House of Representatives (running for U.S. Senate)
- Jayme Stevenson, Darien First Selectman and candidate for lieutenant governor in 2018 (running for U.S. House)
- Erin Stewart, Mayor of New Britain and candidate for governor and lieutenant governor in 2018

=== Lieutenant governor ===
==== Candidates ====
===== Nominee =====
- Laura Devlin, state representative

== Third-party candidates and independent candidates ==
=== Libertarian Party ===
- Aaron Lewis, founder of The Scribe's Institute
  - Running mate: Kevin Skulczyck

=== Green Party ===
- Michelle Louise Bicking, clinical social worker
  - Running mate: Cassandra Martineau, social justice activist

=== Independent Party of Connecticut ===
In 2022, the Independent Party nominated its own candidate for governor for the first time ever. In every previous gubernatorial election since its creation, the party had always cross-endorsed the Republican nominee.

- Rob Hotaling, technology and business leader
  - Running mate: Dr. Stewart “Chip” Beckett, veterinarian, former chairman Capitol Region Council of Governments, Chairman Glastonbury Town Council

=== Working Families Party ===
The Working Families Party endorsed Lamont and Bysiewicz, giving them access to an additional ballot line. Official designee

- Ned Lamont, incumbent governor
  - Running mate: Susan Bysiewicz, incumbent lieutenant governor

=== Griebel-Frank for CT Party ===
The Griebel-Frank for CT Party, which secured 54,741 votes in the 2018 election and is now affiliated with the Forward Party, gained a ballot line for 2022. In September 2022, the party endorsed Lamont and Bysiewicz, giving them access to an unprecedented three ballot lines for the election. Official designee

- Ned Lamont, incumbent governor
  - Running mate: Susan Bysiewicz, incumbent lieutenant governor

== General election ==
=== Predictions ===
Source	Ranking	As of
The Cook Political Report	Solid D	October 28, 2022
Inside Elections	Solid D	March 4, 2022
Sabato's Crystal Ball	Likely D	January 26, 2022
Politico	Lean D	August 12, 2022
RCP	Lean D	January 10, 2022
Fox News	Likely D	May 12, 2022
538	Solid D	September 20, 2022
Elections Daily	Safe D	November 7, 2022

=== Endorsements ===
Ned Lamont (D)

State officials

- Mark Boughton, Commissioner of the Connecticut Department of Revenue Services (2021–present) and former mayor of Danbury (2002–2020) (Republican)
- Mae Flexer, state senator for the 29th district (2015–present)
- Susan Johnson, state senator for the 49th district (2009–present)

Local officials

- Luke Bronin, Mayor of Hartford, Connecticut (2018–present)

Political parties

- Democratic Party of Connecticut
- Griebel-Frank for CT Party (affiliated with the Forward Party)
- Working Families Party

Labor unions

- Connecticut AFL–CIO
- National Education Association
Bob Stefanowski (R)

State officials

- Chris Christie, Governor of New Jersey (2010–2018)
- Pete Ricketts, Governor of Nebraska (2015–2023)
- Chris Sununu, Governor of New Hampshire (2017–present)
- Glenn Youngkin, Governor of Virginia (2022–present)

Organizations

- Connecticut Chapter of the Fraternal Order of Police

Political parties

- Connecticut Republican Party

Newspapers

- Republican-American

=== Fundraising ===
Campaign finance reports as of January 10, 2023
Candidate	Raised	Spent	Cash on hand
Ned Lamont (D)	$25,518,245	$26,087,401	$355,916
Bob Stefanowski (R)	$12,902,700	$14,498,162	$17,840
Source: Connecticut State Elections Enforcement Commission

=== Polling ===
Aggregate polls

Source of poll aggregation	Dates administered	Dates updated	Ned Lamont (D)	Bob Stefanowski (R)	Other (Note: Calculated by taking the difference of 100% and all other candidates combined.)	Margin
Real Clear Politics	September 7–21, 2022	September 28, 2022	53.7%	39.3%	7.0%	Lamont +14.4
FiveThirtyEight	May 11 – November 8, 2022	November 8, 2022	52.9%	38.5%	8.6%	Lamont +14.4
270ToWin	October 16–25, 2022	November 8, 2022	51.5%	39.0%	9.5%	Lamont +12.5
Average			52.7%	38.9%	8.4%	Lamont +13.8

Graphical summary

Poll source	Date(s) administered	Sample size (Note: Key: A – all adults RV – registered voters LV – likely voters V – unclear)	Margin of error	Ned Lamont (D)	Bob Stefanowski (R)	Other	Undecided
Long Island University	October 24–26, 2022	1,004 (A)	± 3.0%	55%	24%	8% (Note: "Not planning to vote" with 5%; "Another candidate" with 3%)	13%
McLaughlin & Associates (R) (Note: Poll conducted for Stefanowski's campaign.)	October 23–24, 2022	500 (LV)	± 4.5%	49%	43%	4% (Note: Hotaling (I) with 4%)	4%
McLaughlin & Associates (R)	October 23–24, 2022	500 (LV)	± 4.5%	50%	46%	–	4%
Quinnipiac University	October 19–23, 2022	1,879 (LV)	± 2.3%	56%	41%	2% (Note: "Refused" with 2%)	1%
Emerson College	October 19–21, 2022	1,000 (LV)	± 3.0%	52%	41%	2% (Note: Hotaling (I) with 1%; "Someone else" with 1%)	5%
Emerson College	October 19–21, 2022	1,000 (LV)	± 3.0%	53%	43%	4% (Note: Hotaling (I) with 2%; "Someone else" with 2%)	–
SurveyUSA	October 15–18, 2022	718 (LV)	–	52%	34%	4% (Note: Hotaling (I) with 4%)	10%
Fabrizo, Lee & Associates (R) (Note: This poll was sponsored by The Connecticut Examiner.)	October 10–13, 2022	1,200 (LV)	± 2.8%	46%	40%	5% (Note: Hotaling with 5%)	10%
Fabrizo, Lee & Associates (R)	October 10–13, 2022	1,200 (LV)	± 2.8%	50%	43%	–	7%
Western New England University	September 15–21, 2022	766 (RV)	± 3.2%	51%	38%	2% (Note: "Refused" with 2%)	8%
Western New England University	September 15–21, 2022	626 (LV)	± 4.8%	55%	40%	2% (Note: "Refused" with 2%)	3%
Quinnipiac University	September 15–19, 2022	1,911 (LV)	± 2.2%	57%	40%	1% (Note: "Refused" with 1%)	2%
Emerson College	September 7–9, 2022	1,000 (LV)	± 3.0%	49%	38%	4%	9%
Quinnipiac University	May 19–23, 2022	1,660 (RV)	± 2.4%	51%	43%	<1% (Note: "Someone else" (volunteered response) with <1%)	6%
Emerson College	May 10–11, 2022	1,000 (RV)	± 3.0%	51%	38%	–	12%
Sacred Heart University	March 24 – April 11, 2022	1,000 (A)	± 3.0%	48%	30%	0%	22%
Public Policy Polling (D) (Note: This poll was sponsored by Democrats for Education Reform CT)	October 21–22, 2021	729 (LV)	± 3.6%	52%	36%	–	12%

Hypothetical polling

Ned Lamont vs. Themis Klarides

Poll source	Date(s) administered	Sample size	Margin of error	Ned Lamont (D)	Themis Klarides (R)	Undecided
Public Policy Polling (D)	October 21–22, 2021	729 (LV)	± 3.6%	52%	32%	16%

Ned Lamont vs. generic opponent

Poll source	Date(s) administered	Sample size	Margin of error	Ned Lamont (D)	Generic Opponent	Undecided
Public Policy Polling (D)	October 21–22, 2021	729 (LV)	± 3.6%	50%	41%	9%

Generic Democrat vs. generic Republican

Poll source	Date(s) administered	Sample size	Margin of error	Generic Democrat	Generic Republican	Other	Undecided
Fabrizo Lee (R)	October 10–13, 2022	1,200 (LV)	–	46%	42%	1% (Note: "Refused" with 1%)	11%

=== Results ===
2022 Connecticut gubernatorial election
Party	Candidate	Votes	%	±%
Democratic	Ned Lamont	691,146	54.47%	+6.37%
Working Families	Ned Lamont	16,175	1.27%	+0.00%
Griebel-Frank for CT	Ned Lamont	2,865	0.23%	−3.66%
Total	Ned Lamont (incumbent)	710,186	55.97%	+6.60%
Republican	Bob Stefanowski	546,209	43.05%	−3.16%
Independent Party	Robert Hotaling	12,400	0.98%	−0.82%
Green	Michelle Louise Bicking (write-in)	98	0.00%	N/A
Total votes		1,268,893	100.0%	
Turnout		1,292,847	57.57%	
Registered electors		2,245,844		
Democratic hold				

==== By county ====
Lamont won six out of all eight counties, while Stefanowski only won two.

County	Ned Lamont Democratic		Bob Stefanowski Republican		Other parties Independent		Total votes cast
County	#	%	#	%	#	%	Total votes cast
Fairfield	185,900	58.8%	128,434	40.6%	2,056	0.6%	316,390
Hartford	185,124	59.6%	121,948	39.3%	3,313	1.1%	310,385
Litchfield	36,591	44.8%	44,282	54.2%	858	1.0%	81,731
Middlesex	41,052	54.9%	32,940	44.0%	830	1.1%	74,822
New Haven	157,023	54.9%	126,124	44.1%	2,723	1.0%	285,870
New London	55,174	54.9%	43,902	43.7%	1,353	1.3%	100,429
Tolland	31,348	52.4%	27,748	46.4%	753	1.3%	59,849
Windham	18,264	46.3%	20,688	52.5%	474	1.2%	39,426
Totals	710,476	55.97%	546,066	43.05%	12,360	0.98%	1,268,902

==== Counties that flipped from Republican to Democratic ====
- Middlesex (largest town: Middletown)
- Tolland (largest town: Vernon)

==== By congressional district ====
Lamont won all five congressional districts.

District	Ned Lamont Democratic		Bob Stefanowski Republican		Other parties Independent		Total votes cast	Representative
District	#	%	#	%	#	%	Total votes cast	Representative
1st	103,281	60.83%	64,555	38.02%	1,960	1.15%	169,796	John B. Larson
2nd	104,030	53.02%	89,650	45.69%	2,517	1.29%	196,197	Joe Courtney
3rd	108,548	56.42%	82,101	42.66%	1,772	0.92%	192,421	Rosa DeLauro
4th	96,180	60.29%	62,389	39.10%	979	0.61%	159,548	Jim Himes
5th	78,655	50.17%	76,554	48.84%	1,550	0.99%	156,759	Jahana Hayes
Totals	710,186	55.97%	546,209	43.05%	12,498	0.98%	1,268,893	

== See also ==
- 2022 United States gubernatorial elections

== Notes ==
Partisan clients
