= Themis Klarides =

American politician (born 1965)

Minority Leader of the Connecticut House of Representatives
- In office January 7, 2015 – January 6, 2021
- Preceded by: Lawrence F. Cafero
- Succeeded by: Vincent Candelora

Member of the Connecticut House of Representatives from the 114th district
- In office January 4, 1999 – January 6, 2021
- Preceded by: Ellen Scalettar
- Succeeded by: Mary Welander

Personal details
- Born: August 3, 1965 (age 60) Seymour, Connecticut, U.S.
- Party: Republican
- Spouse: Gregory Butler (m. 2020)
- Relatives: Nicole Klarides-Ditria (sister)
- Education: Trinity College (BA); Quinnipiac University (JD)

Themis Klarides (born August 3, 1965) is an American attorney and politician from the state of Connecticut. She served in the Connecticut House of Representatives, serving as House Minority Leader from 2015 through 2021. In that position, she was the highest ranking woman in the legislature. She was also the first woman to lead Republican members in the House of Representatives.

== Early life and education ==
Klarides, a resident of Derby, Connecticut, is a native of Seymour, Connecticut. Her parents, Peter and Theodora Klarides, were immigrants from Greece who owned a local supermarket. She graduated from Trinity College and the Quinnipiac University School of Law. Prior to a career in politics and law, Klarides worked as a model and competed as a body builder, as well as appearing as a ring girl on WWE's flagship program Monday Night Raw.

== Professional career ==
Klarides is admitted to practice law in Connecticut and the U.S. District Court for the District of Connecticut. She is a member of the Association for Conflict Resolution, the Connecticut Bar Association and the New Haven County Bar Association. As of October 2024, she practices for Marino, Zabel & Schellenberg, PLLC in the area of municipal law.

As a member of the Walter Camp Football Foundation, Klarides is committed to improving education for all of Connecticut’s children. In 2010, Klarides was given the annual “Champion of Youth” award by the Connecticut Coalition of Boys & Girls Clubs. She also received the 2010 “Children’s Champion” award given annually by the Connecticut Early Childhood Alliance

She has worked closely with The Umbrella, Center for Domestic Violence Services (A program of BHcare), working to assist victims of domestic violence and providing volunteer legal assistance to women and children at the shelter for victims of domestic violence.

Klarides has received several awards from Mothers Against Drunk Driving (MADD), and received their Government Leaders Against Drunk Driving Award in 2016 for her efforts in passing legislation aimed at tightening restrictions against drunk driving offenders.

In 2018, Klarides received an award from the Jewish Federation Association of Connecticut for her work concerning holocaust and genocide education.

Since 2006, she has served on Griffin Hospital’s the Board of Directors and in 2016 was named Second Vice Chair.

She is a former member of the Derby Planning and Zoning Commission and a former member of the Board of Finance in Seymour.

== 2022 Connecticut Senate election ==
On May 26, 2021, Klarides filed paperwork to explore a potential candidacy for Governor of Connecticut in 2022. On January 30, 2022, a week after Businessman and 2018 Republican Gubernatorial Nominee Bob Stefanowski announced his bid for the Republican gubernatorial nomination, Klarides announced a run for Connecticut's Class III Senate seat, then-held by Democratic Senator Richard Blumenthal. She did not win the Republican primary.

== Political career ==
Klarides was elected to the House of Representatives as a Republican in 1998 from the 114th District, serving the towns of Derby, Orange, and Woodbridge. She has been re-elected every term since. She served as the Deputy Minority leader from 2007 to 2014, when she was selected by the membership of her caucus to become the first female leader for the House Republicans effective with the 2015 session. As the House Minority Leader, she has become a leading advocate for fiscal restraint, regulatory reform, job creation and tax relief. She has been an outspoken critic of Governor Malloy and the Democratic tax policies that resulted in the two largest tax increases in state history.

=== Positions ===
Klarides has long advocated for reforms to Connecticut's sex offender registry. In 2015, she championed a bill that created a committee to review the state's sex offender registry laws and regulations. Her position is to have a registry that significantly increases the level of detail on an offender's profile.

The Radiological Society of Connecticut honored her in 2016 for her work in preventable healthcare services for women.

In 2017, Klarides led House Republicans in passing a bipartisan budget that included a bonding cap, a revenue cap, and a volatility cap. These measures resulted in the rebuilding of Connecticut's rainy day fund, as well as the additional payments made in 2021 towards the state's pension liabilities.

In 2019, Klarides argued against removing qualified immunity for police officers during debate on the Police Accountability Act. Klarides voted against the Police Accountability Act.

In 2018, Governor Malloy proposed implementing tolls to provide revenue for the Special Transportation Fund. Klarides worked to defeat the proposal, and called it her signature achievement in the 2018 legislative session. In 2019, Governor Lamont made a push for tolls in Connecticut that failed to pass the legislature, with Klarides called one of "the biggest opponents of tolls".

In 2022, Klarides said she did not vote for President Donald Trump in the 2020 U.S. presidential election.

=== Election history ===
Year	Office	District	Democratic		Republican		Working Families		Independent	
1998	Connecticut State Representative	114th	Patricia M. Pearson	46.1%	Themis Klarides	53.3%			Daniel V. Presnick	0.6%
2000	Connecticut State Representative	114th	William M. Spader, Jr.	42.1%	Themis Klarides	57.3%			Daniel V. Presnick	0.6%
2002	Connecticut State Representative	114th			Themis Klarides	100.0%				
2004	Connecticut State Representative	114th			Themis Klarides	100.0%				
2006	Connecticut State Representative	114th	Suzanne Mizzoni	33.1%	Themis Klarides	66.9%				
2008	Connecticut State Representative	114th	Marc J. Garofalo	44.7%	Themis Klarides	55.3%				
2010	Connecticut State Representative	114th	Joshua D. Hershman	39.0%	Themis Klarides	61.0%				
2012	Connecticut State Representative	114th	Aldon Hynes	36.1%	Themis Klarides	63.9%				
2014	Connecticut State Representative	114th	Aldon Hynes	33.5%	Themis Klarides	66.5%				
2016	Connecticut State Representative	114th			Themis Klarides	85.1%	Aldon Hynes	14.9%		
2018	Connecticut State Representative	114th	Mary Welander	45.6%	Themis Klarides	54.4%				

== Personal life ==
Klarides married Gregory Brian Butler on September 20, 2020 in Orange, Connecticut.

Gregory Brian Butler currently serves as Executive Vice President and General Counsel at the utility company Eversource.

Klarides dated professional wrestler Shawn Michaels in 1995.

Connecticut House of Representatives
Preceded by Ellen Scalettar	Member of the Connecticut House of Representatives from the 114th district 1999–2021	Succeeded by Mary Welander
Preceded by Lawrence F. Cafero	Minority Leader of the Connecticut House of Representatives; 2015–2021	Succeeded by Vincent Candelora
