= Bob Stefanowski =

American politician (born 1962)

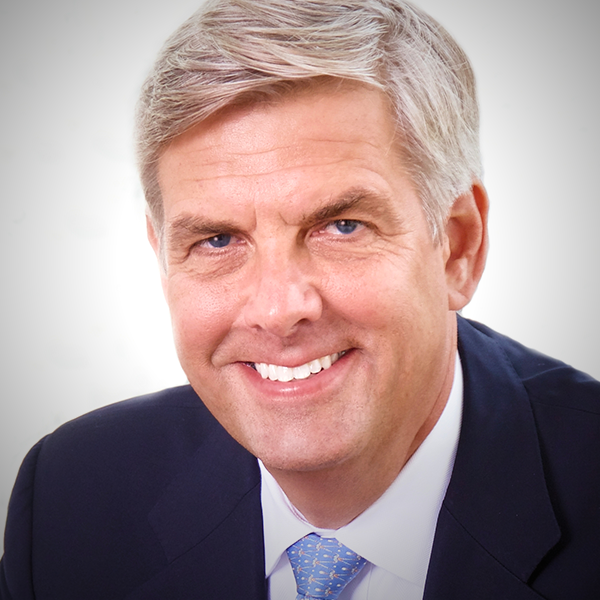
- Stefanowski in 2018
- Born: Robert Vincent Stefanowski; May 21, 1962 (age 64); New Haven, Connecticut, U.S.
- Education: Fairfield University (BS); Cornell University (MBA)
- Political party: Republican (2016–present)
- Other political affiliations: Democratic (before 2016)
- Spouse: Amy Stefanowski
- Children: 3
- Website: Campaign website

Robert Vincent Stefanowski (born May 21, 1962) is an American businessman and politician.

Born and raised in North Haven, Connecticut, he is a former business executive of General Electric, 3i Group plc, UBS, and Dollar Financial Group. He resides in Madison, Connecticut.

Stefanowski was the Republican Party nominee for Governor of Connecticut in 2018 and 2022.

== Early life ==
Stefanowski's father, also named Bob, was the scoreboard assistant for the Yale Bowl. Stefanowski graduated from North Haven High School in 1980. He earned a B.S. in accounting from Fairfield University in 1984 and an MBA from Cornell University in 1992.

Stefanowski began as an auditor in Hartford, Connecticut for PricewaterhouseCoopers after graduating from Fairfield University.

== Business career ==
Stefanowski's tenure at General Electric began in 1994 where he held multiple senior roles through 2007. In 2003, Stefanowski became president and CEO of GE Commercial & Industrial Finance and then proceeded in 2004–2005 to serve as president and CEO of GE Telecom, Media & Technology Finance. Stefanowski worked at the GE Capital headquarters in Norwalk, Connecticut.

From 2008 to 2011, Stefanowski was chairman and managing partner of 3i Group plc in London, England. He then served as chief financial officer of UBS, where he restructured the Investment Bank to meet Basel III regulatory requirements.

From 2014 to 2017 he served as CEO of Dollar Financial Group in London and Philadelphia, Pennsylvania.

From early 2019 to present, Stefanowski has been employed by and in senior leadership and decision-making positions with Neom, a controversial planned futuristic development in the northwest of Saudi Arabia totally owned by the Saudi Government Wealth Fund, PIF.

== Political career ==
=== 2018 campaign for governor ===
In September 2017, Stefanowski announced his candidacy for the Republican nomination for governor of Connecticut in 2018. He campaigned on phasing out the state income tax, corporate income tax, reducing business entity taxes, and eliminating the gift tax and the estate tax, in addition to using zero-based budgeting and creating a Taxpayer Bill of Rights. Stefanowski's tax-cut proposals were backed by Republican economic commentators Arthur Laffer and Larry Kudlow. During his campaign, Stefanowski pledged to oppose further gun-control measures in Connecticut.

His campaign ran television commercials, beginning in January 2018, in the Hartford-New Haven and New York media markets; his ads criticized Democratic governor Dannel P. Malloy, promoting Stefanowski's economic proposals (co-authored with Laffer) and criticizing Malloy's acceptance of publicly funded elections. The Wall Street Journal reported that Stefanowski funded his campaign with a combination of fundraising and his own money, but that he had declined to state how much of his own money he would spend.

He received endorsements from former Republican competitor Peter Lumaj, state representative Noreen Kokoruda, state senator Len Suzio, former U.S. Comptroller General David M. Walker, Middletown Planning and Zoning Commissioner Tyrell Brown, Middletown Board of Education member Edward Ford, Jr., and Shelton Mayor Mark Lauretti.

At the May 2018 state Republican convention at Foxwoods Resort Casino in Mashantucket, Connecticut, the party endorsed Danbury Mayor Mark Boughton; Stefanowski attended the convention but bypassed the formal vote, opting not to place his name into nomination. Stefanowski secured a spot on the Republican primary ballot by collecting the requisite number of signatures.

In August 2018 primary, Stefanowski won the Republican nomination, receiving 29.4% of the vote, surpassing Boughton (21.3%), David Stemerman (18.3%), Tim Herbst (17.6%), and Steve Obsitnik (13.4%). Following Stefanowski's nomination, on August 15, 2018, Donald Trump endorsed the campaign.

In the November 2018, general election, Stefanowski was narrowly defeated by Democrat Ned Lamont.

=== 2022 campaign for governor ===
On January 19, 2022, Stefanowski declared his intent to run for governor again in the 2022 election. He won the Republican nomination at convention on May 6, 2022, with Laura Devlin selected as his running mate. In the November 2022, general election, Stefanowski was defeated by Democrat Ned Lamont again in a rematch by a larger margin.

== Electoral history ==
Connecticut gubernatorial election, 2018 — Republican primary
Party	Candidate	Votes	%
Republican	Bob Stefanowski	42,119	29.4
Republican	Mark D. Boughton	30,505	21.3
Republican	David Stemerman	26,276	18.3
Republican	Tim Herbst	25,144	17.6
Republican	Steve Obsitnik	19,151	13.4
Total votes		143,195	100.0

Connecticut gubernatorial election, 2018 — general election
Party	Candidate	Votes	%
Democratic	Ned Lamont	694,510	49.37
Republican	Bob Stefanowski	650,138	46.21
Independent	Oz Griebel	54,741	3.89
Libertarian	Rod Hanscomb	6,086	0.43
Total votes		1,406,803	100.0
Democratic hold			

Connecticut gubernatorial election, 2022 — general election
Party	Candidate	Votes	%
Democratic	Ned Lamont (incumbent)	710,186	55.97
Republican	Bob Stefanowski	546,209	43.05
Independent Party	Robert Hotaling	12,400	0.98
Green	Michelle Louise Bicking (write-in)	98	0.0
Total votes		1,268,893	100.0
Democratic hold			

== Personal life ==
Stefanowski lives in Madison with his wife, Amy, and his three daughters.

His first book Making M&A Deals Happen was published by McGraw Hill Publishing in February 2007. He is a Wharton Fellow, and has served as adjunct faculty to NYU Stern, London Business School, Cambridge University, and as a visiting professor of management practice at Oxford University.

Stefanowski is a Certified Public Accountant (CPA) and Chartered Financial Analyst (CFA).

== See also ==
- 2018 United States gubernatorial elections
- 2018 Connecticut gubernatorial election
- 2022 United States gubernatorial elections
- 2022 Connecticut gubernatorial election

Party political offices
Preceded by Tom Foley	Republican nominee for Governor of Connecticut; 2018, 2022	Succeeded by Ryan Fazio
