= 2008 United States House of Representatives elections in Connecticut =

- November 4, 2008

All 5 Connecticut seats to the United States House of Representatives
	Majority party	Minority party
Party	Democratic	Republican
Last election	4	1
Seats won	5	0
Seat change	▲1	▼1
Popular vote	1,006,915	504,785
Percentage	65.29%	32.73%
Swing	▲4.94%	▼6.34%

Democratic
40–50%
50–60%
60–70%
70–80%
80–90%
90–100%
Republican
40–50%
50–60%
60–70%

The 2008 congressional elections in Connecticut were held on November 4, 2008, to determine who would represent the state of Connecticut in the United States House of Representatives, coinciding with the presidential election. Representatives are elected for two-year terms; those elected will serve in the 111th Congress from January 3, 2009, until January 3, 2011. The Primary election was held on August 12.

Connecticut has five seats in the House, apportioned according to the 2000 United States census. Its 2007-2008 congressional delegation consisted of four Democrats and one Republican. In the 2008 elections, District 4 changed from Republican to Democratic, so Connecticut's congressional delegation to the 111th Congress consists of five Democrats, giving Connecticut an all-Democratic congressional delegation for the 1st time since 1967. This election also marked the last time any seat in the Connecticut congressional delegation changed partisan control. This marked the first time since the founding of the Republican Party in 1854 that they failed to hold any House seat in New England.

Prior to the election, CQ Politics forecasted districts 2, 4, and 5 to be at some risk for the incumbent party.

== Overview ==
United States House of Representatives elections in Connecticut, 2008
Party	Votes	Percentage	Seats	+/–
Democratic	924,061	59.92%	5	+1
Working Families^{[A]}	82,854	5.37%	5	+1
Republican	504,785	32.73%	0	–1
Green	25,376	1.65%	0	0
Independent	3,082	0.20%	0	0
Libertarian	2,049	0.13%	0	0
Write-in candidates	42	0.00%	0	0
Valid votes	1,542,249	93.76%	—	—
Invalid or blank votes	102,596	6.24%	—	—
Totals	1,644,845	100.00%	5	—
Voter turnout	78.14%			

^{A} The Working Families Party endorsed all the Democratic candidates on a fusion ticket. In the previous election, it only endorsed one Democratic candidate.

=== By district ===
District	Incumbent	2008 Status	Democratic	Republican	Green	Libertarian	Other Party
1	John B. Larson	Re-election	John B. Larson	Joe Visconti	Stephen E. D. Fournier		
2	Joe Courtney	Re-election	Joe Courtney	Sean Sullivan	G. Scott Deshefy	Daniel J. Reale	Todd Vachon
3	Rosa DeLauro	Re-election	Rosa DeLauro	Bo Itshaky	Ralph Ferrucci		
4	Christopher Shays	Re-election	Jim Himes	Christopher Shays	Richard Duffee	Chris Angle	
5	Chris Murphy	Re-election	Chris Murphy	David Cappiello	Harold Burbank		Tom Winn

== District 1 ==
2008 Connecticut's 1st congressional district election
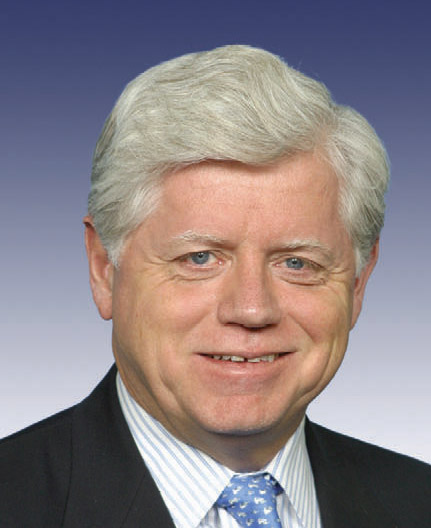

Nominee	John B. Larson^{[A]}	Joe Visconti
Party	Democratic	Republican
Popular vote	211,493	76,860
Percentage	71.6%	26.0%
- Municipality results Larson: 50–60% 60–70% 70–80% 80–90% Visconti: 40–50%
U.S. Representative before election
John B. Larson^{[A]}
Democratic
Elected U.S. Representative
John B. Larson
Democratic

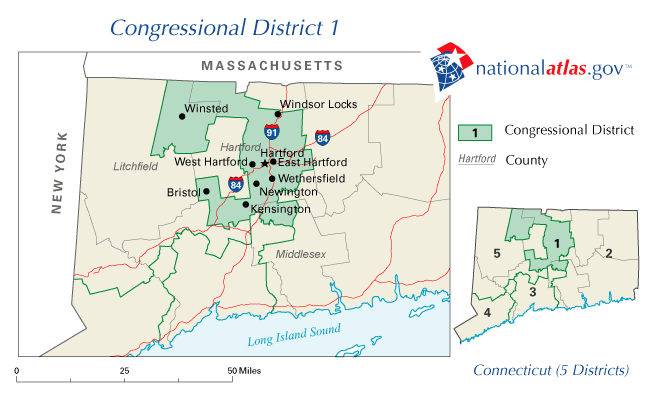

This district covers much of central Connecticut and includes municipalities within Hartford, Litchfield, and Middlesex counties. Five-term incumbent John B. Larson faced Republican Joe Visconti and Green Party candidate Stephen E. D. Fournier.

- Larson's campaign website
- Visconti's campaign website
- Fournier's campaign website
- Race ranking and details from CQ Politics
- Campaign contributions from OpenSecrets

=== Predictions ===
Source	Ranking	As of
The Cook Political Report	Safe D	November 6, 2008
Rothenberg	Safe D	November 2, 2008
Sabato's Crystal Ball	Safe D	November 6, 2008
Real Clear Politics	Safe D	November 7, 2008
CQ Politics	Safe D	November 6, 2008

=== Results ===
Incumbent John B. Larson retained his seat with over 71 percent of the vote.

Connecticut's 1st congressional district election, 2008
Party	Candidate	Votes	%
Democratic	John B. Larson (incumbent)^{[A]}	211,493	71.6
Republican	Joe Visconti	76,860	26.0
Green	Stephen E. D. Fournier	7,201	2.4
Write-In	Matthew Coleman	3	0.0
Total votes		295,557	100.0
Democratic hold			

^{A} Includes 17,000 votes from the Working Families Party line, which endorsed Larson on a fusion ticket.

== District 2 ==
2008 Connecticut's 2nd congressional district election

Nominee	Joe Courtney^{[A]}	Sean Sullivan
Party	Democratic	Republican
Popular vote	212,148	104,574
Percentage	65.7%	32.4%
- Municipality results Courtney: 50–60% 60–70% 70–80%
U.S. Representative before election
Joe Courtney^{[A]}
Democratic
Elected U.S. Representative
Joe Courtney
Democratic

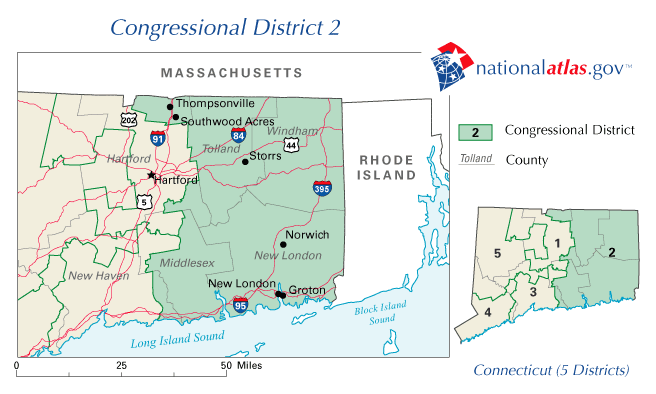

This district covers eastern Connecticut, including New London and Norwich. In the closest U.S. House race of 2006, Democrat Joe Courtney unseated three-term incumbent Republican Rob Simmons by only 82 votes. Courtney's chance at reelection increased when Simmons decided against a rematch. Former Naval Submarine Base New London base commander Sean Sullivan was the Republican candidate. Third-party challengers included former State Department Of Environmental Protection scientist G. Scott Deshefy for the Green Party and Todd Vachon for the Socialist Party, running as a write-in candidate.

- Courtney's campaign website
- Sullivan's campaign website
- Deshefy's campaign website
- Vachon's campaign website
- Race ranking and details from CQ Politics
- Campaign contributions from OpenSecrets

=== Predictions ===
Source	Ranking	As of
The Cook Political Report	Safe D	November 6, 2008
Rothenberg	Safe D	November 2, 2008
Sabato's Crystal Ball	Safe D	November 6, 2008
Real Clear Politics	Safe D	November 7, 2008
CQ Politics	Likely D	November 6, 2008

=== Results ===
Joe Courtney was reelected with a substantially larger margin than in 2006, winning nearly 66 percent of the vote.

Connecticut's 2nd congressional district election, 2008
Party	Candidate	Votes	%
Democratic	Joe Courtney (incumbent)^{[A]}	212,148	65.7
Republican	Sean Sullivan	104,574	32.4
Green	G. Scott Deshefy	6,300	2.0
Write-In	Todd Vachon	19	0.0
Total votes		323,041	100.00
Democratic hold			

^{A} Includes 13,164 votes from the Working Families Party line, which endorsed Courtney on a fusion ticket.

== District 3 ==
2008 Connecticut's 3rd congressional district election
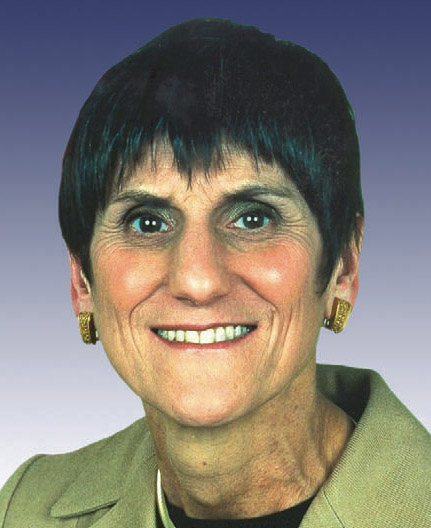

Nominee	Rosa DeLauro^{[A]}	Bo Itshaky
Party	Democratic	Republican
Popular vote	230,172	58,583
Percentage	77.5%	19.7%
- Municipality results Delauro: 60–70% 70–80% 80–90% >90%
U.S. Representative before election
Rosa DeLauro^{[A]}
Democratic
Elected U.S. Representative
Rosa DeLauro
Democratic

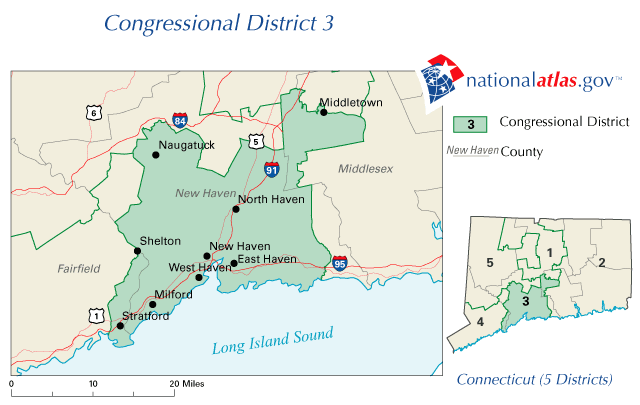

This district is centered on the city of New Haven and its immediate suburbs. The district has been represented by Democrat Rosa DeLauro since 1991. Her challengers in this election included Republican Bo Itshaky and Green Ralph Ferrucci.

- DeLauro's campaign website
- Itshaky's campaign website
- Race ranking and details from CQ Politics
- Campaign contributions from OpenSecrets

=== Predictions ===
Source	Ranking	As of
The Cook Political Report	Safe D	November 6, 2008
Rothenberg	Safe D	November 2, 2008
Sabato's Crystal Ball	Safe D	November 6, 2008
Real Clear Politics	Safe D	November 7, 2008
CQ Politics	Safe D	November 6, 2008

=== Results ===
Rosa DeLauro was easily reelected to a tenth term, receiving over 77 percent of the vote.

Connecticut's 3rd congressional district election, 2008
Party	Candidate	Votes	%
Democratic	Rosa DeLauro (incumbent)^{[A]}	230,172	77.5
Republican	Bo Itshaky	58,583	19.7
Green	Ralph Ferrucci	8,163	2.7
Total votes		296,918	100.00
Democratic hold			

^{A} Includes 25,411 votes from the Working Families Party line, which endorsed DeLauro on a fusion ticket.

== District 4 ==
2008 Connecticut's 4th congressional district election

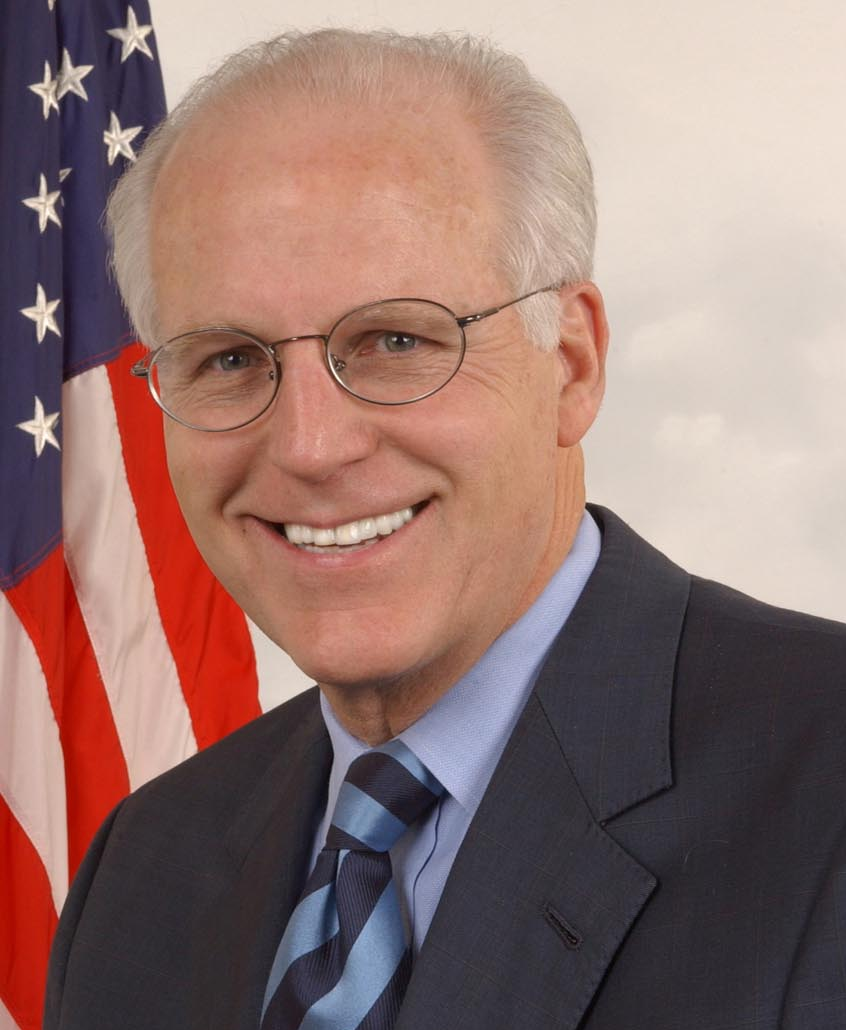
Nominee	Jim Himes	Chris Shays
Party	Democratic	Republican
Popular vote	158,475	146,854
Percentage	51.3%	47.6%
- Municipality results Himes: 50–60% 70–80% Shays: 50–60% 60–70%
U.S. Representative before election
Chris Shays
Republican
Elected U.S. Representative
Jim Himes
Democratic

This district includes portions of Fairfield and New Haven counties in southwestern Connecticut. Democratic nominee Jim Himes, a former Goldman Sachs executive, won against Republican incumbent Chris Shays and third-party candidates Richard Duffee, who withdrew from the 2006 race, and Michael Anthony Carrano.

Shays won 51% of the vote in 2006 and 52% in 2004 in a district that went to John Kerry with 53% in 2004 (CPVI=D+5). In September, 2007, Shays indicated that if he was not given the top Republican seat on the Governmental Oversight Committee, he would retire. The only Republican House member in New England, he was expected to be a top target of Democrats.

Democrat Himes announced his candidacy in April 2007. 2006 U.S. Senate candidate Ned Lamont was considered a potential candidate, although he lost in this district to incumbent Senator Joe Lieberman, whom Shays had endorsed. Other possible Democratic candidates included state Senators Bob Duff and Andrew MacDonald. Former professional hockey player Mike Richter, once considered a possible candidate, announced that he was not interested in running in 2008. It was thought Lowell P. Weicker Jr. might try to reclaim his old seat.

- Shay's campaign website
- Himes' campaign website
- Duffee's campaign website
- Race ranking and details from CQ Politics
- Campaign contributions from OpenSecrets

=== Predictions ===
Source	Ranking	As of
The Cook Political Report	Tossup	November 6, 2008
Rothenberg	Tilt D (flip)	November 2, 2008
Sabato's Crystal Ball	Lean D (flip)	November 6, 2008
Real Clear Politics	Tossup	November 7, 2008
CQ Politics	Tossup	November 6, 2008

=== Results ===
Jim Himes defeated incumbent Christopher Shays, receiving slightly more than 51 percent of the vote. With Himes' victory, the Democrats now control all five of Connecticut's House seats, as well as all other House seats in New England.

Connecticut's 4th congressional district election, 2008
Party	Candidate	Votes	%
Democratic	Jim Himes^{[A]}	158,475	51.3
Republican	Chris Shays (incumbent)	146,854	47.6
Libertarian	Michael Anthony Carrano	2,049	0.7
Green	Richard Duffee	1,388	0.4
Write-In	Eugene Flanagan	10	0.0
Total votes		308,776	100.00
Democratic gain from Republican			

^{A} Includes 9,130 votes from the Working Families Party line, which endorsed Himes on a fusion ticket.

== District 5 ==
2008 Connecticut's 5th congressional district election
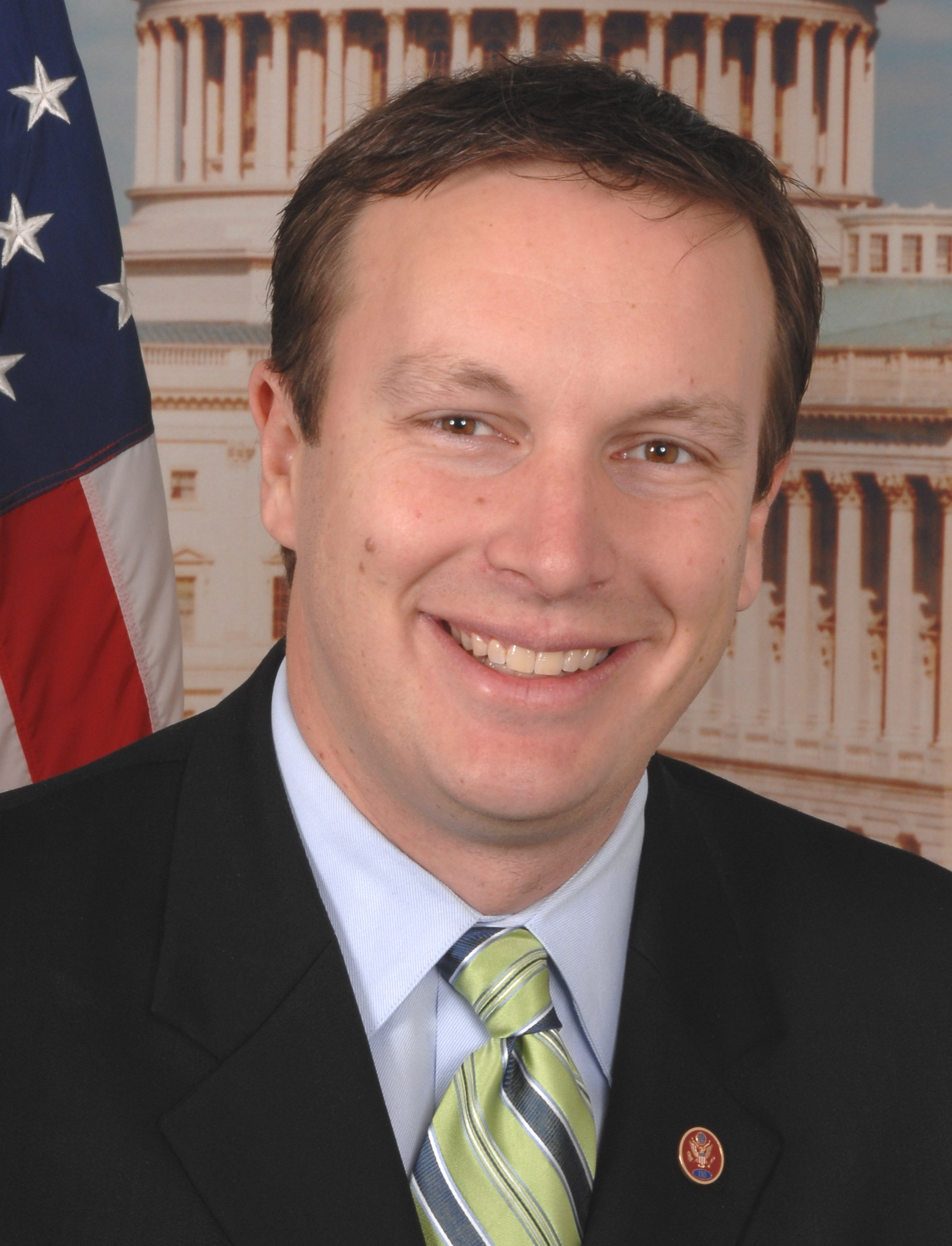

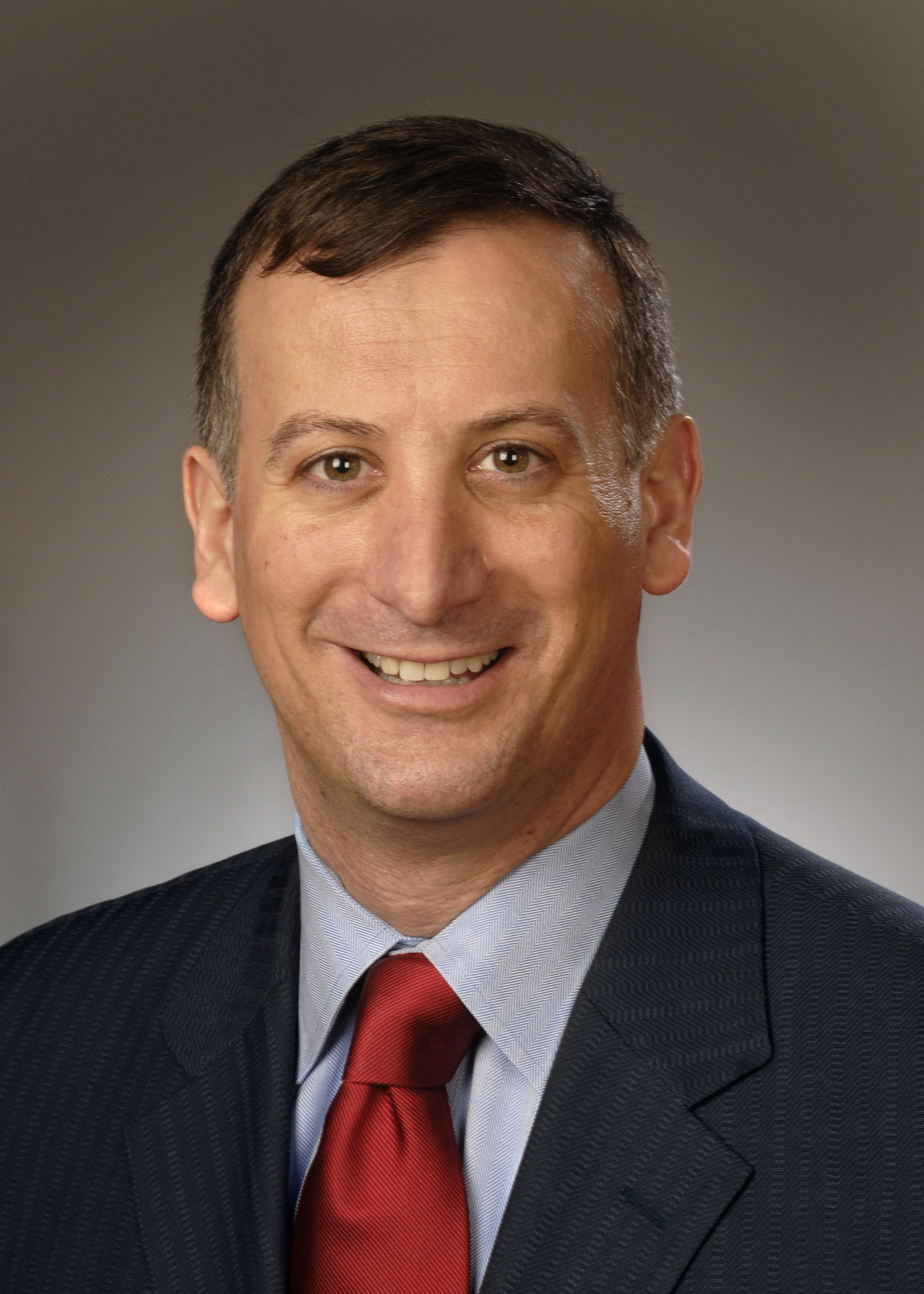
Nominee	Chris Murphy	David Cappiello
Party	Democratic	Republican
Alliance	Working Families
Popular vote	179,327	117,914
Percentage	59.9%	39.4%
- Municipality results Murphy: 40–50% 50–60% 60–70% 70–80% Cappiello: 40–50% 50–60%
U.S. Representative before election
Chris Murphy
Democratic
Elected U.S. Representative
Chris Murphy
Democratic

This district includes all of Northwestern Connecticut, and runs from Meriden and New Britain in Central Connecticut, to Waterbury, the Litchfield Hills, and the Farmington River Valley.

Freshman Democrat Chris Murphy unseated 24-year incumbent Nancy Johnson with 56% of the vote in 2006. Nonetheless, the district is arguably Connecticut's most conservative (CPVI=D+4), and some considered Murphy vulnerable. State Senator David Cappiello was the Republican candidate. Tony Nania also considered a run, but withdrew from consideration for the Republican nomination in May. GOP state chairman Chris Healy dismissed claims that Murphy's large campaign warchest of $420,000 in the first quarter of 2007 may scare off potential challengers, as Cappiello filed as a candidate in April 2007.

National Republicans ran radio ads in the summer of 2007 claiming Murphy has adopted special interest fundraising politics he had claimed to oppose. In addition, Cappiello accused Murphy of missing important votes.

Third-party candidates included Canton attorney Harold Burbank for the Green Party and Watertown resident Tom Winn, running as an independent candidate.

- Murphy's campaign website
- Cappiello's campaign website
- Burbank's campaign website
- Winn's campaign website
- Race ranking and details from CQ Politics
- Campaign contributions from OpenSecrets

=== Predictions ===
Source	Ranking	As of
The Cook Political Report	Safe D	November 6, 2008
Rothenberg	Safe D	November 2, 2008
Sabato's Crystal Ball	Safe D	November 6, 2008
Real Clear Politics	Safe D	November 7, 2008
CQ Politics	Lean D	November 6, 2008

=== Results ===
Chris Murphy retained his seat, receiving just under 60 percent of the vote.

Connecticut's 5th congressional district election, 2008
Party	Candidate	Votes	%
Democratic	Chris Murphy (incumbent)^{[A]}	179,327	59.9
Republican	David Cappiello	117,914	39.4
Independent	Thomas L. Winn	3,082	1.0
Green	Harold H. Burbank II	2,324	0.8
Write-In	Walter Gengarelly	10	0.0
Total votes		299,575	100.00
Democratic hold			

^{A} Includes 18,149 votes from the Working Families Party line, which endorsed Murphy on a fusion ticket.

Preceded by 2006 elections	United States House elections in Connecticut; 2008	Succeeded by 2010 elections
