= Otterness =

Otterness is a surname. Notable people with the surname include:

- A. K. Otterness, American writer
- Tom Otterness (born 1952), American sculptor
- Naomi Otterness (1941–2023), American politician
