= Connecticut's 2nd congressional district =

U.S. House district for Connecticut

Coordinates: 41°39′13″N 72°12′23″W

- Interactive map of district boundaries since January 3, 2023
- Representative: Joe Courtney; D–Vernon
- Area: 2,143 mi^{2} (5,550 km^{2})
- Distribution: 67.77% urban; 33.23% rural
- Population (2025): 732,098
- Median household income: $101,900
- Ethnicity: 78.0% White; 9.3% Hispanic; 4.4% Two or more races; 3.7% Asian; 3.7% Black; 0.9% other
- Cook PVI: D+4

Connecticut's 2nd congressional district is a congressional district in the U.S. state of Connecticut. Located in the eastern part of the state, the district includes all of New London County, Tolland County, and Windham County, along with parts of Hartford, Middlesex, and New Haven counties. Principal cities include Enfield, Norwich, New London, and Groton.

The district is currently represented by Democrat Joe Courtney. With a Cook Partisan Voting Index rating of D+4, it is one of the least Democratic districts in Connecticut, a state with an all-Democratic congressional delegation.

== Composition ==
For the 118th and successive Congresses (based on redistricting following the 2020 census), Connecticut's 2nd district contains all or portions of five planning regions and 64 municipalities.

Capitol Planning Region (15)

Andover, Bolton, Columbia, Coventry, Ellington, Enfield, Glastonbury (part; also 1st), Hebron, Mansfield, Marlborough, Somers, Stafford, Suffield, Tolland, Vernon, Willington

Lower Connecticut River Valley Planning Region (12)

Chester, Clinton, Deep River, East Haddam, East Hampton, Essex, Haddam, Killingworth, Lyme, Old Lyme, Old Saybrook, Westbrook

Northeastern Connecticut Planning Region (16)

All 16 municipalities

South Central Connecticut Planning Region (1)

Madison

Southeastern Connecticut Planning Region (20)

All 20 municipalities

=== Voter registration ===
Voter registration and party enrollment as of October 31, 2023
Party	Active	Inactive	Total	Percentage
Democratic	144,072	13,769	157,841	29.85%
Republican	115,845	9,243	125,088	23.66%
Minor Parties	8,840	948	9,788	1.85%
Unaffiliated	211,538	24,486	236,024	44.64%
Total	480,295	48,446	528,741	100%

== Recent election results from statewide races ==
Year	Office	Results
2008	President	Obama 59% - 40%
2010	Senate	Blumenthal 55% - 43%
2010	Governor	Foley 51% - 47%
2012	President	Obama 57% - 43%
2012	Senate	Murphy 54% - 46%
2014	Governor	Foley 50% - 47%
2016	President	Clinton 49% - 45%
2016	Senate	Blumenthal 61% - 36%
2018	Senate	Murphy 55% - 44%
2018	Governor	Stefanowski 49% - 45%
2018	Attorney General	Hatfield 52% - 47%
2020	President	Biden 55% - 43%
2022	Senate	Blumenthal 55% - 45%
2022	Governor	Lamont 53% - 46%
2022	Secretary of the State	Thomas 53% - 45%
2022	Treasurer	Russell 50% - 47%
2022	Comptroller	Scanlon 53% - 47%
2022	Attorney General	Tong 55% - 44%
2024	President	Harris 53% - 45%
2024	Senate	Murphy 55% - 43%

== Recent elections ==
=== 1992 ===
US House election, 1992
Party	Candidate	Votes	%	±%
Democratic	Samuel Gejdenson (incumbent)	123,291	51%	
Republican	Edward W. Munster	119,416	49%	
Democratic hold		Swing		
Turnout		242,707	100%	

=== 1994 ===
US House election, 1994
Party	Candidate	Votes	%	±%
Democratic	Samuel Gejdenson (incumbent)	79,188	43%	
Republican	Edward W. Munster	79,167	43%	
A Connecticut Party (1990)	David Bingham	27,716	14%	
Democratic hold		Swing		
Turnout		186,071	100%	

=== 1996 ===
US House election, 1996
Party	Candidate	Votes	%	±%
Democratic	Samuel Gejdenson (incumbent)	115,175	52%	
Republican	Edward W. Munster	100,332	45%	
Independence Party of America	Dianne G. Ondusko	6,477	3%	
Natural Law	Thomas E. Hall	1,263	0.4%	
Democratic hold		Swing		
Turnout		223,258	100%	

=== 1998 ===
US House election, 1998
Party	Candidate	Votes	%	±%
Democratic	Samuel Gejdenson (inc.)	99,567	61%	
Republican	Gary M. Koval	57,860	35%	
Independence Party of America	Dianne G. Ondusko	5,116	3%	
Term Limits	Paul W. Cook	658	0.4%	
Democratic hold		Swing		
Turnout		163,201	100%	

=== 2000 ===
US House election, 2000
Party	Candidate	Votes	%	±%
Republican	Rob Simmons	114,380	51%	
Democratic	Samuel Gejdenson (incumbent)	111,520	49%	
Republican gain from Democratic		Swing		
Turnout		225,900	100%	

=== 2002 ===
US House election, 2002
Party	Candidate	Votes	%	±%
Republican	Rob Simmons (incumbent)	117,434	54%	
Democratic	Joe Courtney	99,674	46%	
Republican hold		Swing		
Turnout		217,108	100%	

=== 2004 ===
US House election, 2004
Party	Candidate	Votes	%	±%
Republican	Rob Simmons (inc.)	165,558	54%	
Democratic	James Sullivan	139,987	46%	−
Republican hold		Swing		
Turnout		305,545	100%	

=== 2006 ===
US House election, 2006: Connecticut District 2
Party	Candidate	Votes	%	±%
Democratic	Joe Courtney	121,248	50%	
Republican	Rob Simmons (incumbent)	121,158	50%	
Democratic gain from Republican		Swing		
Turnout		242,413	100%	

=== 2008 ===
US House election, 2008: Connecticut District 2
Party	Candidate	Votes	%	±%
Democratic	Joe Courtney (incumbent)	212,411	66%	
Republican	Sean Sullivan	104,469	32%	
Green	G. Scott Deshefy	6,287	2%	
Democratic hold		Swing		
Turnout		323,167	100%	

=== 2010 ===
US House election, 2010: Connecticut District 2
Party	Candidate	Votes	%	±%
Democratic	Joe Courtney (incumbent)	147,748	60%	
Republican	Janet Peckinpaugh	95,671	39%	
Green	G. Scott Deshefy	3,344	1%	
Democratic hold		Swing		
Turnout		246,763	100%	

=== 2012 ===
Connecticut 2nd Congressional District Election, 2012
Party	Candidate	Votes	%	±%
Democratic	Joe Courtney (incumbent)	204,691	68%	
Republican	Paul Formica	87,828	29%	
Green	Colin Bennett	3,269	2%	
Libertarian	Daniel Reale	3,504	1%	
Democratic hold		Swing		
Turnout		299,652	100%	

=== 2014 ===
Connecticut 2nd Congressional District Election, 2014
Party	Candidate	Votes	%	±%
Democratic	Joe Courtney (incumbent)	141,948	62%	
Republican	Lori Hopkins-Cavanagh	80,837	36%	
Green	William Clyde	2,602	1%	
Libertarian	Daniel Reale	2,549	1%	
Democratic hold		Swing		
Turnout		227,936	100%	

=== 2016 ===
Connecticut 2nd Congressional District Election, 2016
Party	Candidate	Votes	%	±%
Democratic	Joe Courtney (incumbent)	207,584	63%	
Republican	Daria Novak	111,587	34%	
Green	Jonathan Pelto	5,332	2%	
Libertarian	Daniel Reale	5,016	1%	
Democratic hold		Swing		
Turnout		329,519	100%	

=== 2018 ===
Connecticut 2nd Congressional District Election, 2018
Party	Candidate	Votes	%	±%
Democratic	Joe Courtney (incumbent)	179,731	62%	
Republican	Dan Postemski	102,483	35%	
Green	Michelle Louise Bicking	3,595	1%	
Libertarian	Dan Reale	3,305	1%	
Democratic hold		Swing		
Turnout		289,114	100%	

=== 2020 ===
Connecticut 2nd Congressional District Election, 2020
Party	Candidate	Votes	%	±%
Democratic	Joe Courtney (incumbent)	217,982	59.37%	
Republican	Justin Anderson	140,340	38.2%	
Green	Cassandra Martineau	4,949	1.35%	
Libertarian	Dan Reale	3,901	1.06%	
Democratic hold		Swing		
Turnout		367,181	100%	

=== 2022 ===
Connecticut 2nd Congressional District Election, 2022
Party	Candidate	Votes	%	±%
Democratic	Joe Courtney (incumbent)	165,946	58.2	
Republican	Mike France	114,506	40.2	
Green	Kevin Blacker	2,439	0.9	
Libertarian	William Hall	2,140	0.7	
Total votes		285,031	100.0	
Democratic hold				

=== 2024 ===
Connecticut 2nd Congressional District Election, 2024
Party	Candidate	Votes	%	±%
Democratic	Joe Courtney (incumbent)	218,162	58.0	−0.2
Republican	Mike France	157,878	42.0	+1.8
Total votes		376,040	100.0	
Democratic hold				

== List of members representing the district ==
District organized from Connecticut's at-large congressional district in 1837.

Member (Residence)	Party	Years of service	Cong ress	Electoral history	Location
District created March 4, 1837
Samuel Ingham (Saybrook)	Democratic	March 4, 1837 – March 3, 1839	25th	Redistricted from the at-large district and re-elected in 1837. Lost re-election.	
William L. Storrs (Middletown)	Whig	March 4, 1839 – June, 1840	26th	Elected in 1839. Resigned when appointed Associate Justice of the Connecticut Supreme Court.	
Vacant		June, 1840 – December 7, 1840	26th		
William Whiting Boardman (New Haven)	Whig	December 7, 1840 – March 3, 1843	26th 27th	Elected in special election due to Storrs resignation. Retired.	
John Stewart (Middle Haddam)	Democratic	March 4, 1843 – March 3, 1845	28th	Elected in 1843. Lost re-election.	
Samuel Dickinson Hubbard (Middletown)	Whig	March 4, 1845 – March 3, 1849	29th 30th	Elected in 1845. Re-elected in 1847. Retired.	
Walter Booth (Meriden)	Free Soil	March 4, 1849 – March 3, 1851	31st	Elected in 1849. Lost re-election.	
Colin M. Ingersoll (New Haven)	Democratic	March 4, 1851 – March 3, 1855	32nd 33rd	Elected in 1851. Re-elected in 1853. Retired.	
John Woodruff (New Haven)	American	March 4, 1855 – March 3, 1857	34th	Elected in 1855. Lost re-election.	
Samuel Arnold (Haddam)	Democratic	March 4, 1857 – March 3, 1859	35th	Elected in 1857. Retired.	
John Woodruff (New Haven)	Republican	March 4, 1859 – March 3, 1861	36th	Elected in 1859. Retired.	
James E. English (New Haven)	Democratic	March 4, 1861 – March 3, 1865	37th 38th	Elected in 1861. Re-elected in 1863. Retired.	
Samuel L. Warner (Middletown)	Republican	March 4, 1865 – March 3, 1867	39th	Elected in 1865. Retired.	
Julius Hotchkiss (Middletown)	Democratic	March 4, 1867 – March 3, 1869	40th	Elected in 1867. Retired.	
Stephen Wright Kellogg (Waterbury)	Republican	March 4, 1869 – March 3, 1875	41st 42nd 43rd	Elected in 1869. Re-elected in 1871. Re-elected in 1873. Lost re-election.	
James Phelps (Essex)	Democratic	March 4, 1875 – March 3, 1883	44th 45th 46th 47th	Elected in 1875. Re-elected in 1876. Re-elected in 1878. Re-elected in 1880. Retired.	
Charles Le Moyne Mitchell (New Haven)	Democratic	March 4, 1883 – March 3, 1887	48th 49th	Elected in 1882. Re-elected in 1884. Retired.	
Carlos French (Seymour)	Democratic	March 4, 1887 – March 3, 1889	50th	Elected in 1886. Retired.	
Washington F. Willcox (Chester)	Democratic	March 4, 1889 – March 3, 1893	51st 52nd	Elected in 1888. Re-elected in 1890. Retired.	
James P. Pigott (New Haven)	Democratic	March 4, 1893 – March 3, 1895	53rd	Elected in 1892. Lost re-election.	
Nehemiah D. Sperry (New Haven)	Republican	March 4, 1895 – March 3, 1911	54th 55th 56th 57th 58th 59th 60th 61st	Elected in 1894. Re-elected in 1896. Re-elected in 1898. Re-elected in 1900. Re-elected in 1902. Re-elected in 1904. Re-elected in 1906. Re-elected in 1908. Retired.	
Thomas L. Reilly (Meriden)	Democratic	March 4, 1911 – March 3, 1913	62nd	Elected in 1910. Redistricted to the 3rd district.	
Bryan F. Mahan (New London)	Democratic	March 4, 1913 – March 3, 1915	63rd	Elected in 1912. Lost re-election.	
Richard P. Freeman (New London)	Republican	March 4, 1915 – March 3, 1933	64th 65th 66th 67th 68th 69th 70th 71st 72nd	Elected in 1914. Re-elected in 1916. Re-elected in 1918. Re-elected in 1920. Re-elected in 1922. Re-elected in 1924. Re-elected in 1926. Re-elected in 1928. Re-elected in 1930. Lost re-election.	
William L. Higgins (South Coventry)	Republican	March 4, 1933 – January 3, 1937	73rd 74th	Elected in 1932. Re-elected in 1934. Lost re-election.	
William J. Fitzgerald (Norwich)	Democratic	January 3, 1937 – January 3, 1939	75th	Elected in 1936. Lost re-election.	
Thomas R. Ball (Old Lyme)	Republican	January 3, 1939 – January 3, 1941	76th	Elected in 1938. Lost re-election.	
William J. Fitzgerald (Norwich)	Democratic	January 3, 1941 – January 3, 1943	77th	Elected in 1940. Lost re-election.	
John D. McWilliams (Norwich)	Republican	January 3, 1943 – January 3, 1945	78th	Elected in 1942. Lost re-election.	
Chase G. Woodhouse (New London)	Democratic	January 3, 1945 – January 3, 1947	79th	Elected in 1944. Lost re-election.	
Horace Seely-Brown Jr. (Pomfret Center)	Republican	January 3, 1947 – January 3, 1949	80th	Elected in 1946. Lost re-election.	
Chase G. Woodhouse (Sprague)	Democratic	January 3, 1949 – January 3, 1951	81st	Elected in 1948. Lost re-election.	
Horace Seely-Brown Jr. (Pomfret Center)	Republican	January 3, 1951 – January 3, 1959	82nd 83rd 84th 85th	Elected in 1950. Re-elected in 1952. Re-elected in 1954. Re-elected in 1956. Lost re-election.	
Chester Bowles (Essex)	Democratic	January 3, 1959 – January 3, 1961	86th	Elected in 1958. Retired when appointed Under Secretary of State	
Horace Seely-Brown Jr. (Pomfret Center)	Republican	January 3, 1961 – January 3, 1963	87th	Elected in 1960. Retired after running for US Senate	
William St. Onge (Putnam)	Democratic	January 3, 1963 – May 1, 1970	88th 89th 90th 91st	Elected in 1962. Re-elected in 1964. Re-elected in 1966. Re-elected in 1968. Died.	
Vacant		May 1, 1970 – November 3, 1970	91st		
Robert H. Steele (Vernon)	Republican	November 3, 1970 – January 3, 1975	91st 92nd 93rd	Elected to finish St. Onge's term. Re- elected in 1970. Re-elected in 1972. Retired after running for Governor of Connecticut.	
Chris Dodd (North Stonington)	Democratic	January 3, 1975 – January 3, 1981	94th 95th 96th	Elected in 1974. Re-elected in 1976. Re-elected in 1978. Retired when elected to the US Senate	
Sam Gejdenson (Bozrah)	Democratic	January 3, 1981 – January 3, 2001	97th 98th 99th 100th 101st 102nd 103rd 104th 105th 106th	Elected in 1980. Re-elected in 1982. Re-elected in 1984. Re-elected in 1986. Re-elected in 1988. Re-elected in 1990. Re-elected in 1992. Re-elected in 1994. Re-elected in 1996. Re-elected in 1998. Lost re-election.	
Rob Simmons (Stonington)	Republican	January 3, 2001 – January 3, 2007	107th 108th 109th	Elected in 2000. Re-elected in 2002. Re-elected in 2004. Lost re-election.	
Rob Simmons (Stonington)	Republican	January 3, 2001 – January 3, 2007	107th 108th 109th	Elected in 2000. Re-elected in 2002. Re-elected in 2004. Lost re-election.	2003–2013
Joe Courtney (Vernon)	Democratic	January 3, 2007 – present	110th 111th 112th 113th 114th 115th 116th 117th 118th 119th	Elected in 2006. Re-elected in 2008. Re-elected in 2010. Re-elected in 2012. Re-elected in 2014. Re-elected in 2016. Re-elected in 2018. Re-elected in 2020. Re-elected in 2022. Re-elected in 2024. Re-elected in 2026.	2003–2013
Joe Courtney (Vernon)	Democratic	January 3, 2007 – present	110th 111th 112th 113th 114th 115th 116th 117th 118th 119th	Elected in 2006. Re-elected in 2008. Re-elected in 2010. Re-elected in 2012. Re-elected in 2014. Re-elected in 2016. Re-elected in 2018. Re-elected in 2020. Re-elected in 2022. Re-elected in 2024. Re-elected in 2026.	2013–2023
Joe Courtney (Vernon)	Democratic	January 3, 2007 – present	110th 111th 112th 113th 114th 115th 116th 117th 118th 119th	Elected in 2006. Re-elected in 2008. Re-elected in 2010. Re-elected in 2012. Re-elected in 2014. Re-elected in 2016. Re-elected in 2018. Re-elected in 2020. Re-elected in 2022. Re-elected in 2024. Re-elected in 2026.	2023–present
