= 1988 United States House of Representatives elections in Connecticut =

- November 8, 1988

All 6 Connecticut seats to the United States House of Representatives
- Turnout: 81.4%
| | Majority party | Minority party |
|---|---|---|
| Party | Republican | Democratic |
| Last election | 3 | 3 |
| Seats won | 3 | 3 |
| Seat change | Steady | Steady |
| Popular vote | 676,817 | 660,360 |
| Percentage | 50.48% | 49.26% |
| Swing | ▲6.18% | ▼6.37% |
Municipality results
Republican
50–60%
60–70%
70–80%
80-90%
Democratic
50–60%
60–70%
70–80%
80–90%

The 1988 United States House of Representatives elections in Connecticut were held on November 8, 1988, to elect the six members of the U.S. House, one from each of the state's congressional districts, to represent Connecticut in the 101st Congress. These elections coincided with the 1988 U.S. presidential election, a U.S. Senate election, as well as elections to the General Assembly.

As no district changed partisan control, the Republicans and Democrats retained the 3–3 split in the state's congressional delegation.

== Overview ==
United States House of Representatives elections in Connecticut, 1988
| Party | Votes | Percentage | Seats | +/– |
|---|---|---|---|---|
| Republican | 676,817 | 50.48% | 3 | 0 |
| Democratic | 660,360 | 49.26% | 3 | 0 |
| War Against AIDS | 2,379 | 0.18% | 0 | 0 |
| Independent | 1,054 | 0.08% | 0 | 0 |
| Totals | 1,340,610 | 100.00% | 6 | — |

Popular vote
| Republican | 50.48% |
| Democratic | 49.26% |

House seats
| Republican | 50.0% |
| Democratic | 50.0% |

== District 1 ==
1988 Connecticut's 1st congressional district election
- Turnout: 81.6%
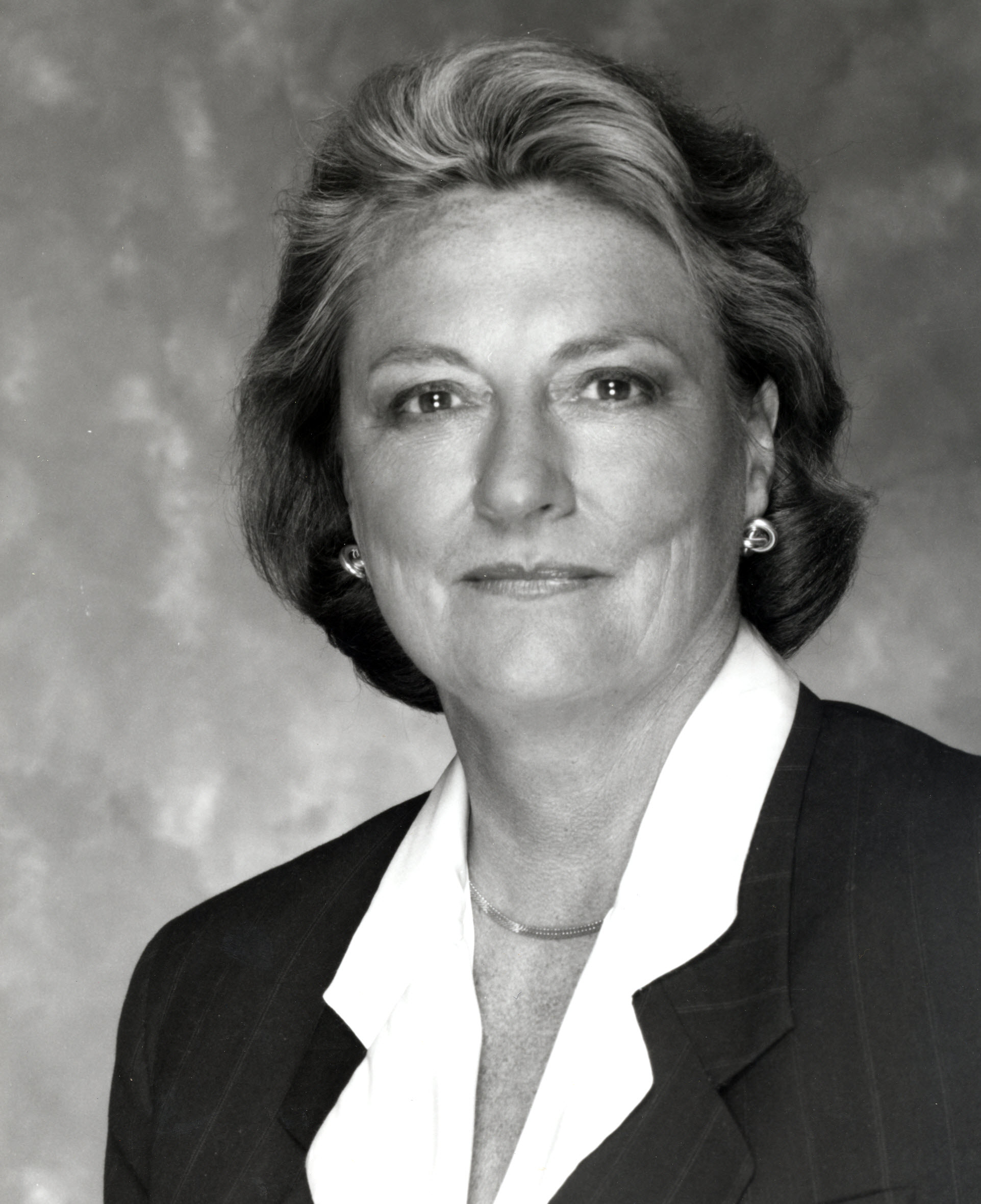

| Nominee | Barbara B. Kennelly | Mario Robles Jr. |
| Party | Democratic | Republican |
| Popular vote | 176,463 | 51,985 |
| Percentage | 77.24% | 22.76% |
- Municipality results Kennelly 70–80% 80-90%
U.S. Representative before election
Barbara B. Kennelly
Democratic
Elected U.S. Representative
Barbara B. Kennelly
Democratic

Incumbent Democrat Barbara B. Kennelly, who was originally elected in a 1982 special election, defeated Republican nominee Mario Robles Jr., a nuclear safety expert from Windsor.

Results

1988 Connecticut's 1st congressional district election
| Party | Candidate | Votes | % |
|---|---|---|---|
| Democratic | Barbara B. Kennelly (incumbent) | 176,463 | 77.24% |
| Republican | Mario Robles Jr. | 51,985 | 22.76% |
| Total votes | | 228,448 | 100.00% |
| Democratic hold | | | |

== District 2 ==
1988 Connecticut's 2nd congressional district election
- Turnout: 82.0%
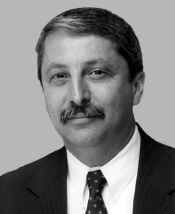

| Nominee | Sam Gejdenson | Glenn Carberry |
| Party | Democratic | Republican |
| Popular vote | 143,326 | 81,965 |
| Percentage | 63.62% | 36.38% |
- Municipality results Gejdenson 50–60% 60–70% 70–80% Carberry 50–60%
U.S. Representative before election
Sam Gejdenson
Democratic
Elected U.S. Representative
Sam Gejdenson
Democratic

Incumbent Democrat Sam Gejdenson, originally elected in 1980, defeated Republican nominee Glenn T. Carberry, an attorney from Norwich.

Results

1988 Connecticut's 2nd congressional district election
| Party | Candidate | Votes | % |
|---|---|---|---|
| Democratic | Sam Gejdenson (incumbent) | 143,326 | 63.62% |
| Republican | Glenn Carberry | 81,965 | 36.38% |
| Total votes | | 225,291 | 100.00% |
| Democratic hold | | | |

== District 3 ==
1988 Connecticut's 3rd congressional district election
- Turnout: 78.6%
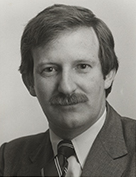

| Nominee | Bruce Morrison | Gerard B. Patton |
| Party | Democratic | Republican |
| Popular vote | 147,394 | 74,275 |
| Percentage | 66.49% | 33.51% |
- Municipality results Morrison 50–60% 60–70% 70–80% 80-90%
U.S. Representative before election
Bruce Morrison
Democratic
Elected U.S. Representative
Bruce Morrison
Democratic

Incumbent Democratic congressman Bruce Morrison, originally elected in 1982, defeated Gerard B. Patton, a state representative from the 119th district.

Results

1988 Connecticut's 3rd congressional district election
| Party | Candidate | Votes | % |
|---|---|---|---|
| Democratic | Bruce Morrison (incumbent) | 147,394 | 66.49% |
| Republican | Gerard B. Patton | 74,275 | 33.51% |
| Total votes | | 221,669 | 100.00% |
| Democratic hold | | | |

== District 4 ==
1988 Connecticut's 4th congressional district election
- Turnout: 80.4%
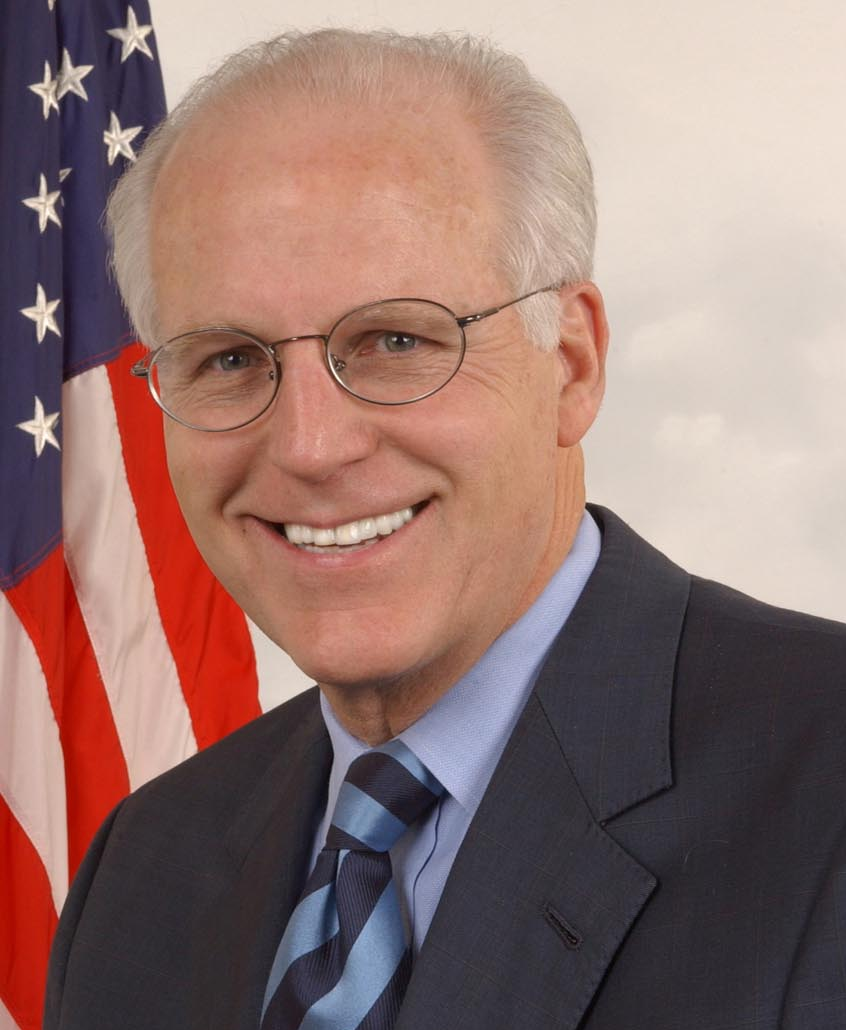

| Nominee | Chris Shays | Roger Pearson |
| Party | Republican | Democratic |
| Popular vote | 147,843 | 55,751 |
| Percentage | 71.78% | 27.07% |
U.S. Representative before election
Chris Shays
Republican
Elected U.S. Representative
Chris Shays
Republican

Incumbent Republican Chris Shays, originally elected in 1987, defeated Democratic nominee Roger Pearson, the former First Selectman of Greenwich.

=== Democratic primary ===
The Democratic convention met on August 1, 1988, at Bridgeport city hall to select the nominee for the 4th district. Roger Pearson, the former First selectman of Greenwich, won a majority of delegate votes on the first ballot, defeating two other candidates. One of the candidates, Carl Shanahan scored above the 20% threshold needed to wage a primary but decided against it. This was the only contested congressional nomination this cycle.

==== Nominee ====
- Roger J. Pearson, former First Selectman of Greenwich (1983–1985)

==== Defeated at convention ====
- W. Carl Shanahan Jr., cable television executive from Stamford
- John C. Loeser, IBM executive from Stamford

==== Convention ====
August 1 Democratic convention
| Candidate | Round 1 | |
| Candidate | Votes | % |
|---|---|---|
| Roger Pearson | 107 | 55.7% |
| W. Carl Shanahan Jr. | 79 | 41.2% |
| John Loeser | 6 | 3.1% |
| Inactive Ballots | 0 ballots | |

=== General election ===
==== Results ====
1988 Connecticut's 4th congressional district election
| Party | Candidate | Votes | % |
|---|---|---|---|
| Republican | Chris Shays (incumbent) | 147,843 | 71.78% |
| Democratic | Roger Pearson | 55,751 | 27.07% |
| War Against AIDS | Nicholas J. Tarzia | 2,379 | 1.15% |
| Total votes | | 205,973 | 100.00% |
| Republican hold | | | |

== District 5 ==
1988 Connecticut's 5th congressional district election
- Turnout: 83.3%
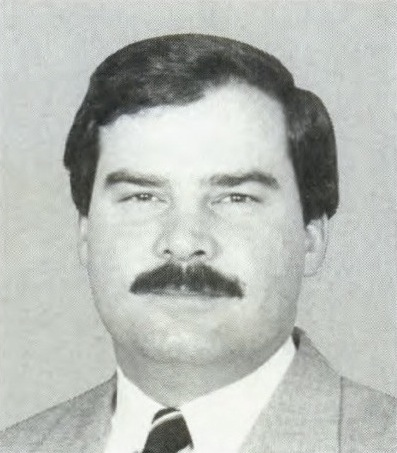

| Nominee | John G. Rowland | Joseph Marinan Jr. |
| Party | Republican | Democratic |
| Popular vote | 163,729 | 58,612 |
| Percentage | 73.64% | 26.36% |
U.S. Representative before election
John G. Rowland
Republican
Elected U.S. Representative
John G. Rowland
Republican

Incumbent Republican congressman John G. Rowland, originally elected in 1984, defeated Democratic nominee Joseph J. Marinan Jr., the former mayor of Meriden.

Results

1988 Connecticut's 5th congressional district election
| Party | Candidate | Votes | % |
|---|---|---|---|
| Republican | John G. Rowland (incumbent) | 163,729 | 73.64% |
| Democratic | Joseph Marinan Jr. | 58,612 | 26.36% |
| Total votes | | 222,341 | 100.00% |
| Republican hold | | | |

== District 6 ==
1988 Connecticut's 6th congressional district election
- Turnout: 82.7%
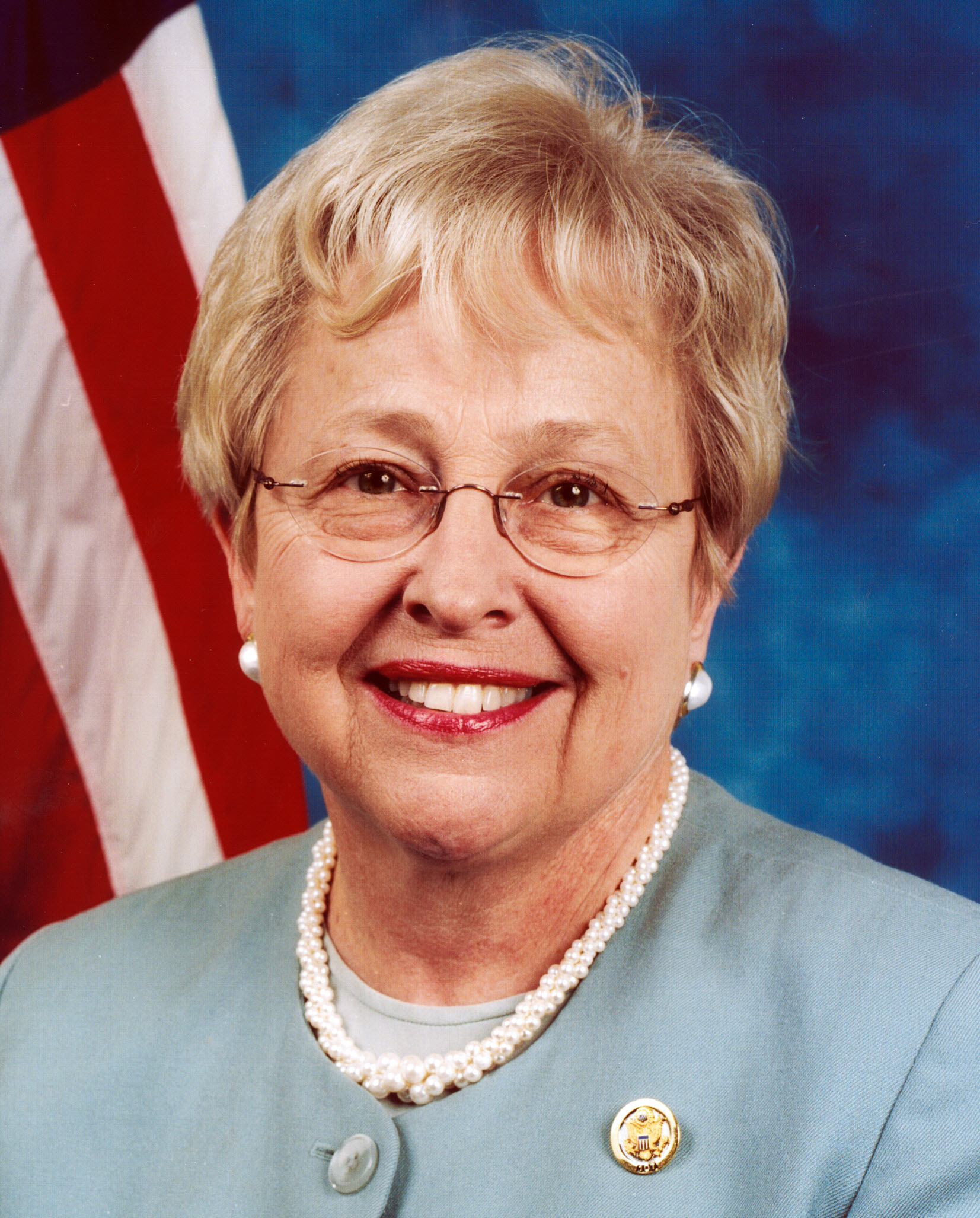

| Nominee | Nancy Johnson | James L. Griffin |
| Party | Republican | Democratic |
| Popular vote | 157,020 | 78,814 |
| Percentage | 66.28% | 33.27% |
- Municipality results Johnson 50–60% 60–70% 70–80% 80-90%
U.S. Representative before election
Nancy Johnson
Republican
Elected U.S. Representative
Nancy Johnson
Republican

Incumbent Republican congresswoman Nancy Johnson, originally elected in 1982, defeated Democratic nominee James L. Griffin, an insurance executive from Bristol.

Results

1988 Connecticut's 6th congressional district election
| Party | Candidate | Votes | % |
|---|---|---|---|
| Republican | Nancy L. Johnson (incumbent) | 157,020 | 66.28% |
| Democratic | James L. Griffin | 78,814 | 33.27% |
| Independent | Louis J. Marietta | 1,054 | 0.45% |
| Total votes | | 236,888 | 100.00% |
| Republican hold | | | |
