= Naomi Otterness =

American politician (1941–2023)

Member of the Connecticut House of Representatives from the 42nd district
- In office 1979–1983
- Preceded by: Kenneth E. Stober
- Succeeded by: Glenn N. Arthur

Personal details
- Born: Naomi Wastila; October 28, 1941 Superior, Wisconsin, U.S.
- Died: November 8, 2023 (aged 82) Ledyard, Connecticut, U.S.
- Party: Democratic
- Spouse: Ivan Otterness
- Children: 2
- Education: University of Wisconsin; University of Southern California

Naomi Otterness (October 28, 1941 – November 8, 2023) was an American politician who served in the Connecticut House of Representatives from 1979 to 1983, representing the 42nd district as a Democrat.

== Personal life and education ==
Otterness was born Naomi Wastila on October 28, 1941, in Superior, Wisconsin. She attended the University of Wisconsin, where she majored in chemistry and education, and she later attended graduate school at the University of Southern California (USC), where she researched organophosphorus compounds. While studying at USC, she met her husband, Ivan Otterness. In 1971, they moved to Ledyard, Connecticut, and together they had two children.

Otterness died of cancer on November 8, 2023, in Ledyard. She was 82.

== Political career ==
Otterness began her political career in Ledyard. She was part of the Ledyard Parks and Recreation committee, and in 1975, Governor Ella Grasso appointed Otterness to serve on the State Board of Directors of the Connecticut Voluntary Action Center.

Otterness was first elected to the Connecticut House of Representatives in 1978, and she served two terms representing the 42nd district as a Democrat. She ran for reelection in 1982, but was defeated by Republican candidate Glenn N. Arthur.

Following her service in the House of Representatives, Otterness worked as a legislative aide to Sam Gejdenson, a position she held from 1982 to 1999.
