= 1994 United States House of Representatives elections in Connecticut =

U.S. Election

- November 8, 1994

All 6 Connecticut seats to the United States House of Representatives
- Turnout: 65.1%
| | Majority party | Minority party |
|---|---|---|
| Party | Republican | Democratic |
| Last election | 3 | 3 |
| Seats won | 3 | 3 |
| Seat change | Steady | Steady |
| Popular vote | 516,134 | 506,272 |
| Percentage | 48.28% | 47.35% |
| Swing | ▼0.44% | ▲2.45% |

Republican
30–40%
40–50%
50–60%
60–70%
70–80%
80–90%
Democratic
40–50%
50–60%
60–70%
70–80%
80–90%

The 1994 United States House of Representatives elections in Connecticut were held on November 8, 1994, to elect the six members of the U.S. House, one from each of the state's congressional districts, to represent Connecticut in the 104th Congress. These elections coincided with a gubernatorial election and a U.S. Senate election, as well as elections to the state legislature.

In a national year which would become known as the Republican Revolution, all incumbents ran for and won re-election.

== Overview ==
United States House of Representatives elections in Connecticut, 1994
| Party | Votes | Percentage | Seats | +/– |
|---|---|---|---|---|
| Republican (Note: Votes cast on the A Connecticut Party line for candidates cross-endorsed by that party (Barbara Kennelly, Susan Johnson, James H. Maloney and Charlotte Koskoff) are included in the totals of the candidates' major party. The A Connecticut Party total reflects only votes for its own nominee, David Bingham, in the 2nd district.) | 516,134 | 48.28% | 3 | 0 |
| Democratic | 506,272 | 47.35% | 3 | 0 |
| A Connecticut | 27,716 | 2.59% | 0 | 0 |
| Concerned Citizens | 16,379 | 1.53% | 0 | 0 |
| Libertarian | 1,976 | 0.19% | 0 | 0 |
| Natural Law | 688 | 0.06% | 0 | 0 |
| Write-in candidates | 2 | 0.00% | 0 | 0 |
| Totals | 1,069,167 | 100.00% | 6 | — |

Popular vote
| Republican | 48.28% |
| Democratic | 47.35% |

House seats
| Republican | 50% |
| Democratic | 50% |

== District 1 ==
1994 Connecticut's 1st congressional district election
- Turnout: 67.6%
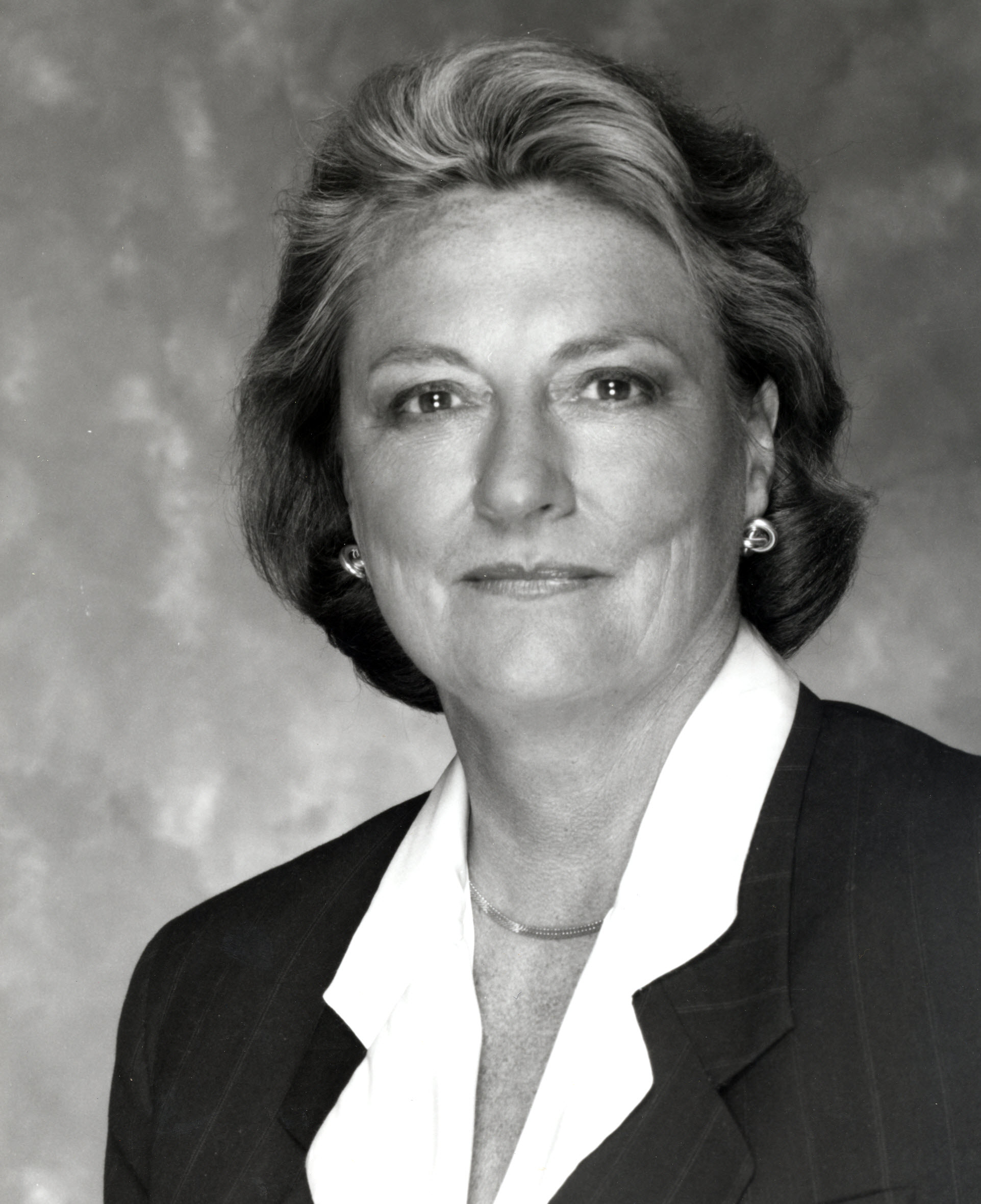

| Nominee | Barbara Kennelly | Douglas T. Putnam |
| Party | Democratic | Republican |
| Alliance | A Connecticut |
| Popular vote | 138,637 | 46,865 |
| Percentage | 73.4% | 24.8% |
- Municipality results Kennelly 60–70% 70–80% 80–90%
U.S. Representative before election
Barbara Kennelly
Democratic
Elected U.S. Representative
Barbara Kennelly
Democratic

Incumbent Democrat Barbara Kennelly, who was originally elected in a 1982 special election, defeated Republican challenger Douglas T. Putnam, a vice-president of Advance Inc.

Results

1994 Connecticut's 1st congressional district election
| Party | Candidate | Votes | % |
|---|---|---|---|
| Democratic | Barbara Kennelly | 88,946 | 47.09% |
| A Connecticut Party | Barbara Kennelly | 49,691 | 26.30% |
| Total | Barbara Kennelly (incumbent) | 138,637 | 73.39% |
| Republican | Douglas T. Putnam | 46,865 | 24.81% |
| Concerned Citizens | John F. Forry III | 3,405 | 1.80% |
| Total votes | | 188,907 | 100.00% |
| Democratic hold | | | |

== District 2 ==
1994 Connecticut's 2nd congressional district election
- Turnout: 67.0%
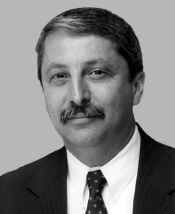

| Nominee | Sam Gejdenson | Edward W. Munster | David Bingham |
| Party | Democratic | Republican | A Connecticut |
| Popular vote | 79,188 | 79,167 | 27,716 |
| Percentage | 42.56% | 42.55% | 14.89% |
- Municipality results Gejdenson 40–50% 50–60% 60–70% Munster 30–40% 40–50% 50–60%
U.S. Representative before election
Sam Gejdenson
Democratic
Elected U.S. Representative
Sam Gejdenson
Democratic

In what would be one of the closest congressional elections in Connecticut history, and the closest race of the 1994 House election cycle, incumbent Democrat Sam Gejdenson, originally elected in 1980, narrowly won a rematch against Republican nominee Edward W. Munster, a former state Senator from Haddam and candidate for this seat in 1992, and A Connecticut Party nominee David Bingham, a physician from Salem.

On election day, it appeared that Gejdenson had won by two votes, and in a recount he had apparently won by four votes. After a ruling by the Connecticut Supreme Court on December 16, Gejdenson was declared the winner by a margin of 21 votes.

Results

1994 Connecticut's 2nd congressional district election
| Party | Candidate | Votes | % |
|---|---|---|---|
| Democratic | Sam Gejdenson (incumbent) | 79,188 | 42.56% |
| Republican | Edward W. Munster | 79,167 | 42.55% |
| A Connecticut Party | David Bingham | 27,716 | 14.89% |
| Write-in | Howard E. Proper Lamchick | 2 | 0.00% |
| Total votes | | 186,073 | 100.00% |
| Democratic hold | | | |

== District 3 ==
1994 Connecticut's 3rd congressional district election
- Turnout: 62.5%
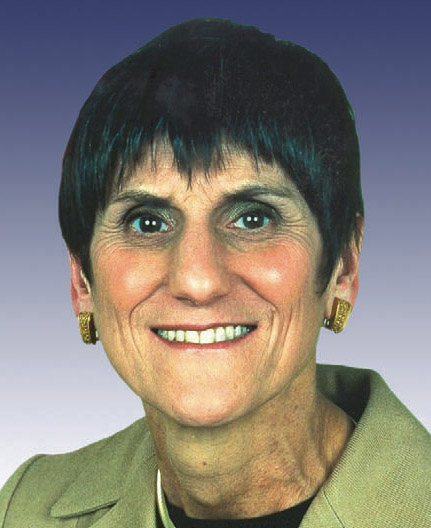

| Nominee | Rosa DeLauro | Susan Johnson |
| Party | Democratic | Republican |
| Alliance | | A Connecticut |
| Popular vote | 111,261 | 64,094 |
| Percentage | 63.45% | 36.55% |
- Municipality results DeLauro 50–60% 60–70% 80–90%
U.S. Representative before election
Rosa DeLauro
Democratic
Elected U.S. Representative
Rosa DeLauro
Democratic

Incumbent Democrat Rosa DeLauro, originally elected in 1990, defeated Republican nominee Susan Johnson, a lawyer from Hamden and professor at Teikyo Post University.

Results

1994 Connecticut's 3rd congressional district election
| Party | Candidate | Votes | % |
|---|---|---|---|
| Democratic | Rosa DeLauro (incumbent) | 111,261 | 63.45% |
| Total | Susan Johnson | 64,094 | 36.55% |
| Republican | Susan Johnson | 53,110 | 30.29% |
| A Connecticut Party | Susan Johnson | 10,984 | 6.26% |
| Total votes | | 175,355 | 100.00% |
| Democratic hold | | | |

== District 4 ==
1994 Connecticut's 4th congressional district election
- Turnout: 58.4%
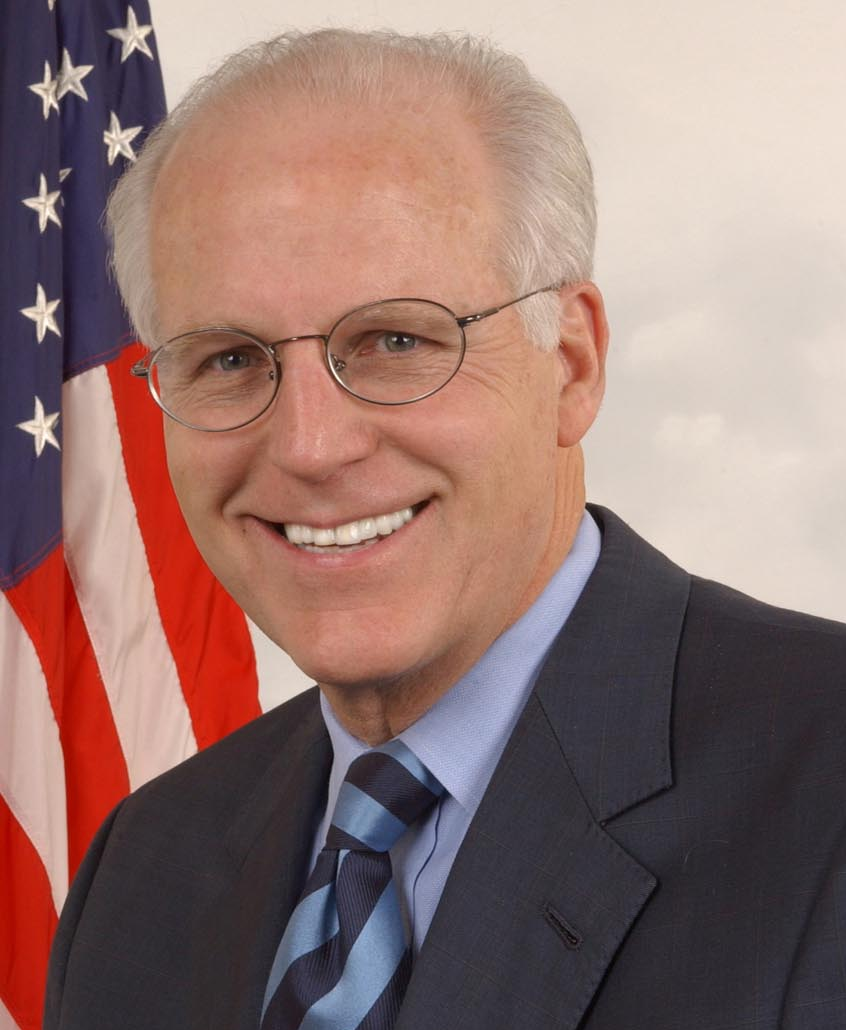

| Nominee | Chris Shays | Jonathan D. Kantrowitz |
| Party | Republican | Democratic |
| Popular vote | 109,436 | 34,962 |
| Percentage | 74.42% | 23.77% |
- Municipality results Shays 50–60% 70–80% 80–90%
U.S. Representative before election
Chris Shays
Republican
Elected U.S. Representative
Chris Shays
Republican

Incumbent Republican Chris Shays, originally elected in a 1987 special election, defeated Democratic nominee and Fairfield businessman Jonathan D. Kantrowitz with 74.4% of the vote.

Results

1994 Connecticut's 4th congressional district election
| Party | Candidate | Votes | % |
|---|---|---|---|
| Republican | Chris Shays (incumbent) | 109,436 | 74.42% |
| Democratic | Jonathan D. Kantrowitz | 34,962 | 23.77% |
| Libertarian | Irving Sussman | 1,976 | 1.34% |
| Natural Law | Terry M. Nevas | 688 | 0.47% |
| Total votes | | 147,062 | 100.00% |
| Republican hold | | | |

== District 5 ==
1994 Connecticut's 5th congressional district election
- Turnout: 65.7%
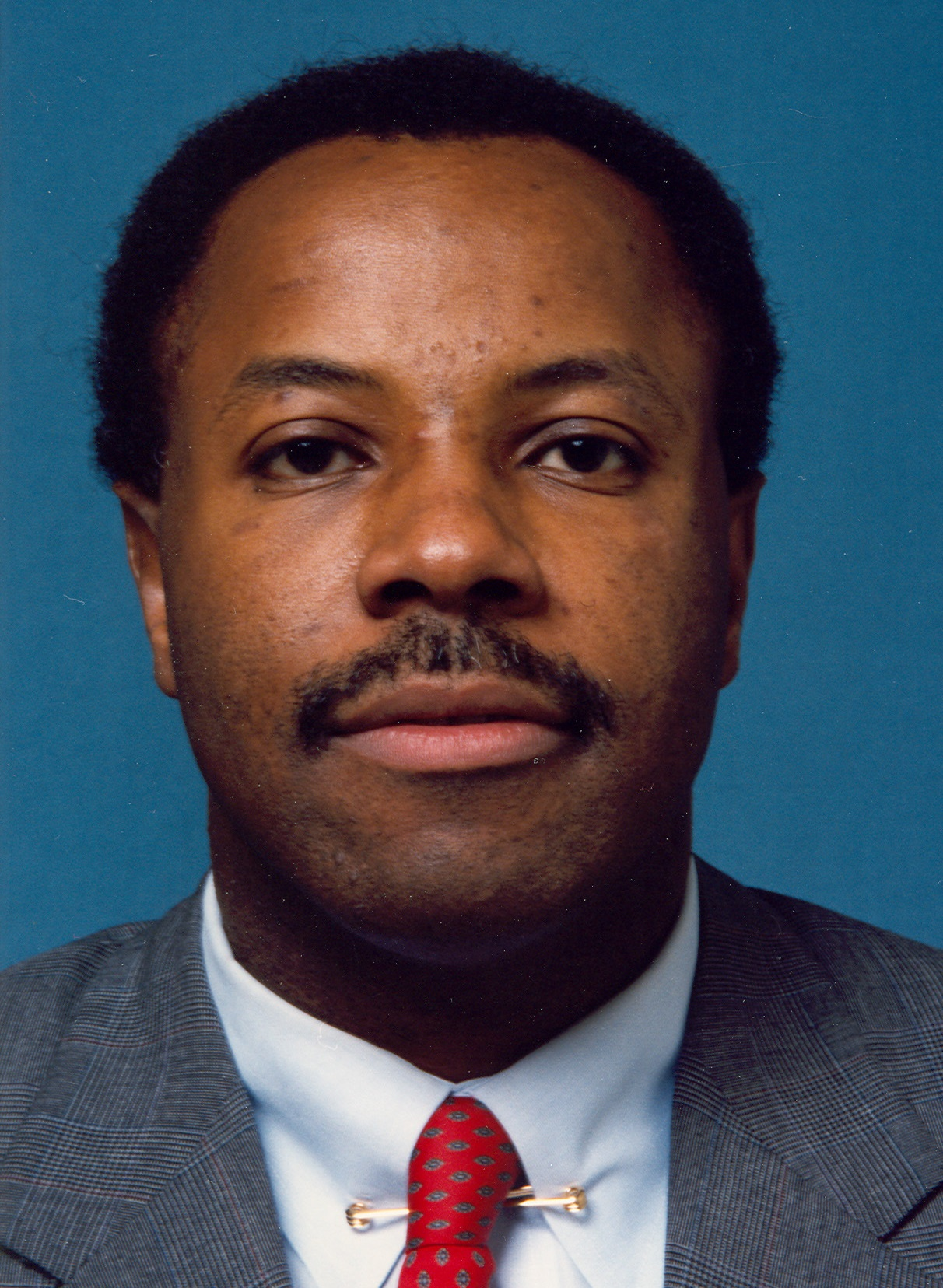

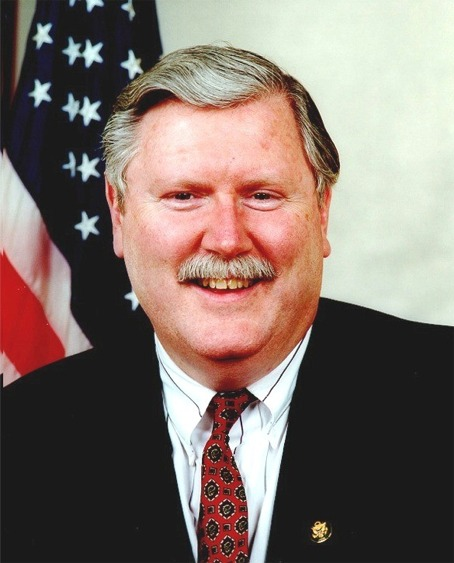
| Nominee | Gary Franks | James H. Maloney |
| Party | Republican | Democratic |
| Alliance | | A Connecticut |
| Popular vote | 93,471 | 81,523 |
| Percentage | 52.20% | 45.53% |
- Municipality results Franks 40–50% 50–60% 60–70% Maloney 40–50% 50–60%
U.S. Representative before election
Gary Franks
Republican
Elected U.S. Representative
Gary Franks
Republican

Incumbent Republican Gary Franks won re-election to a third term, defeating Democratic nominee and state Senator James H. Maloney.

=== Democratic primary ===
==== Candidates ====
===== Nominee =====
- James H. Maloney, state Senator for the 24th district from Danbury

===== Eliminated in primary =====
- Thomas S. Luby, state Representative for the 82nd district from Meriden and House Majority Leader

==== Convention ====
July 18, 1994 Democratic convention
| Candidate | Round 1 | |
| Candidate | Votes | % |
|---|---|---|
| James H. Maloney | 137 | 67.2% |
| Thomas S. Luby | 67 | 32.8% |
| Inactive Ballots | 1 ballot | |

==== Primary results ====
Results by municipality: Maloney: 50–60%; 60–70%; 70–80%; 80–90%; Luby: 50–60%; 60–70%; 70–80%

September 13, 1994 Democratic primary
| Party | Candidate | Votes | % |
|---|---|---|---|
| Democratic | James H. Maloney | 12,100 | 54.66% |
| Democratic | Thomas S. Luby | 10,035 | 45.34% |
| Total votes | | 22,135 | 100.00% |

=== General election ===
==== Results ====
1994 Connecticut's 5th congressional district election
| Party | Candidate | Votes | % |
|---|---|---|---|
| Republican | Gary Franks (incumbent) | 93,471 | 52.20% |
| Total | James H. Maloney | 81,523 | 45.53% |
| Democratic | James H. Maloney | 57,579 | 32.16% |
| A Connecticut Party | James H. Maloney | 23,944 | 13.37% |
| Concerned Citizens | Rosita Rodriguez | 4,059 | 2.27% |
| Total votes | | 179,053 | 100.00% |
| Republican hold | | | |

== District 6 ==
1994 Connecticut's 6th congressional district election
- Turnout: 69.2%
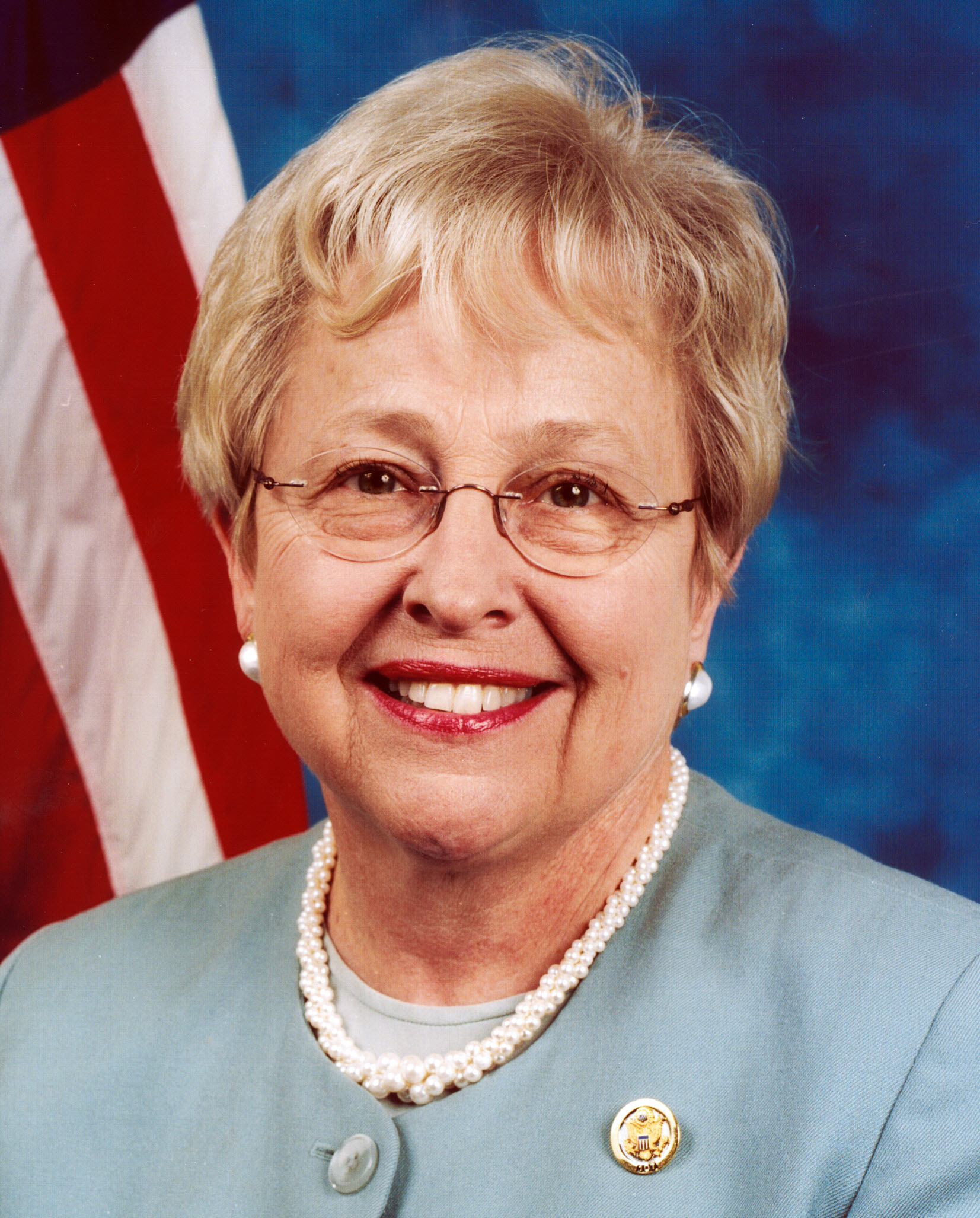

| Nominee | Nancy Johnson | Charlotte Koskoff |
| Party | Republican | Democratic |
| Alliance | | A Connecticut |
| Popular vote | 123,101 | 60,701 |
| Percentage | 63.88% | 31.50% |
- Municipality results Johnson 50–60% 60–70% 70–80% Koskoff 40–50%
U.S. Representative before election
Nancy Johnson
Republican
Elected U.S. Representative
Nancy Johnson
Republican

Incumbent Republican Nancy Johnson, originally elected in 1982, defeated Democratic nominee Charlotte Koskoff with 63.9% of the vote.

Results

1994 Connecticut's 6th congressional district election
| Party | Candidate | Votes | % |
|---|---|---|---|
| Republican | Nancy Johnson (incumbent) | 123,101 | 63.88% |
| Total | Charlotte Koskoff | 60,701 | 31.50% |
| Democratic | Charlotte Koskoff | 44,159 | 22.92% |
| A Connecticut Party | Charlotte Koskoff | 16,542 | 8.58% |
| Concerned Citizens | Patrick J. Danford | 8,915 | 4.62% |
| Total votes | | 192,717 | 100.00% |
| Republican hold | | | |
