= Keith Denning =

American politician

Member of the Connecticut House of Representatives from the 42nd district
- In office January 4, 2023 – January 8, 2025
- Preceded by: Mike France
- Succeeded by: Savet Constantine

Personal details
- Born: Columbus, Indiana, U.S.
- Party: Democratic
- Spouse: Christine
- Children: 1
- Education: IPFW (RN); Wake Forest University (CRNA)
- Occupation: Retired Nurse Anesthetist

Keith Denning is an American politician who served in the Connecticut House of Representatives for the 42nd district since 2023.

== Biography ==
Denning has been a nurse anesthetist since 1983.

In January 2024, Denning announced that he would not seek re-election.
