= Mary McGrattan =

American politician

Member of the Connecticut House of Representatives from the 42nd district
- In office 1993–2003
- Preceded by: Glenn N. Arthur
- Succeeded by: Bob Congdon

Personal details
- Born: June 16, 1940 (age 86) New York City, U.S.
- Party: Democratic
- Spouse: Robert McGrattan
- Children: 9

Mary K. McGrattan (born June 16, 1940) is an American politician from Connecticut. From 1983 to 1991, she was mayor of Ledyard. From 1993 to 2003, she served in the Connecticut House of Representatives, where she represented the 42nd district as a Democrat. During her tenure, she lived in Gales Ferry, a village in Ledyard.
