= Connecticut's 42nd House of Representatives district =

American legislative district

Connecticut's 42nd State House of Representatives district
Representative
Savet Constantine; D

Connecticut's 42nd House of Representatives district elects one member of the Connecticut House of Representatives. It currently consists of the town of Wilton and parts of New Canaan and Ridgefield. It has been represented by Democrat Savet Constantine since 2025.

== List of representatives ==
List of representatives from Connecticut's 42nd State House district
Representative	Party	Years	District home	Note
Victor Tudan	Democratic	1967–1973	Windsor	Seat created
Kenneth E. Stober	Republican	1973–1979	Ledyard	
Naomi Otterness	Democratic	1979–1983	Ledyard	
Glenn N. Arthur	Republican	1983–1993	Gales Ferry	
Mary McGrattan	Democratic	1993–2003	Gales Ferry	
Bob Congdon	Republican	2003–2005	Preston	
Tom Reynolds	Democratic	2005–2013	Gales Ferry	
Timothy Russell Bowles	Democratic	2013–2015	Preston	
Mike France	Republican	2015–2023	Gales Ferry	
Keith Denning	Democratic	2023–2025	Wilton	
Savet Constantine	Democratic	2025–	Wilton	

== Recent elections ==
=== 2022 ===
2022 Connecticut State House of Representatives election, 42nd District
Party	Candidate	Votes	%
Democratic	Keith Denning	5,514	52.39
Republican	Kim Healy	4,838	45.97
Independent Party	Kim Healy	173	1.64
Total votes		10,525	100.00
Democratic gain from Republican			

=== 2020 ===
2020 Connecticut State House of Representatives election, District 42
Party	Candidate	Votes	%
Republican	Mike France (incumbent)	6,013	50.75
Democratic	Matt Green	5,134	43.33
Independent Party	Mike France (incumbent)	311	2.62
Working Families	Matt Green	294	2.48
Petitioning	Robert W. Lawrence	96	0.81
Total votes		11,848	100.00
Republican hold			

=== 2018 ===
2018 Connecticut House of Representatives election, District 42
Party	Candidate	Votes	%
Republican	Mike France (Incumbent)	5,085	56.7
Democratic	Elizabeth Schwebel	3,880	43.3
Total votes		8,965	100.00
Republican hold			

=== 2016 ===
2016 Connecticut House of Representatives election, District 42
Party	Candidate	Votes	%
Republican	Mike France	7,591	100.00
Republican hold			

=== 2014 ===
2014 Connecticut House of Representatives election, District 42
Party	Candidate	Votes	%
Republican	Mike France	3,585	51.00
Democratic	Timothy Bowles (Incumbent)	2,891	41.1
Independent Party	Mike France	328	4.7
Working Families	Timothy Bowles (Incumbent)	232	3.3
Total votes		7,036	100.00
Republican gain from Democratic			

=== 2012 ===
2012 Connecticut House of Representatives election, District 42
Party	Candidate	Votes	%
Democratic	Timothy Bowles (Incumbent)	4,785	52.2
Republican	Elizabeth Schwebel	4,388	47.8
Total votes		9,173	100.00
Democratic hold			
