= Mike France (politician) =

American politician (born 1962)

Member of the Connecticut House of Representatives from the 42nd district
- In office January 7, 2015 – January 4, 2023
- Preceded by: Timothy Bowles
- Succeeded by: Keith Denning (redistricting)

Personal details
- Born: October 22, 1962 (age 63) Memphis, Tennessee, U.S.
- Party: Republican
- Education: University of Southern California (BS); Naval Postgraduate School (MS); Eastern Connecticut State University (MS)

Mike France (born October 22, 1962) is an American politician who served in the Connecticut House of Representatives from the 42nd district from 2015 to 2023. France was the Republican nominee for Connecticut's 2nd congressional district in 2022 and 2024, losing to incumbent Joe Courtney.

France is a candidate for the Republican nomination to the same seat in 2026.

== Early life and Navy career ==
France was chosen in 1993 to become an Engineering Duty Officer and attended the Naval Postgraduate School in Monterey, California, where he earned a Master of Science degree in Electrical Engineering and the degree of Electrical Engineer. He began his career as a Damage Control Assistant aboard USS Mars and later served as Combat System Officer and Navigator aboard USS Reeves, doing three deployments to the Indian Ocean and Persian Gulf in support of Operation Desert Storm and Operation Southern Watch. After graduate school he transferred to Portsmouth Naval Shipyard, where he eventually became Project Superintendent for an $18 million overhaul of USS Dolphin. In 2002 he transferred to Supervisor of Shipbuilding in Groton, Connecticut, working as the Program Manager's Representative for the Virginia class submarine's Non Propulsion Electronics System. He retired from the Navy in 2005 after twenty years of active duty service.

== Civilian career ==
Following his retirement, France was hired as a Senior Systems Engineer by Progeny Systems Corporation, a local defense contractor. In August 2005 he earned a Master of Science degree in Organizational Management from Eastern Connecticut State University. He was promoted to Engineering Manager in 2008 and served through 2018 as the Joint Interoperability certification lead for the Program Executive Officer, Submarines.

=== Local government ===
In November 2011 France was elected to the Ledyard Town Council and was assigned to chair its Finance Committee. He served 3 years on the town council in total. During his time serving, in November 2012, he was arrested in Gales Ferry and charged with second degree breach of peace following a family dispute reported by his teenage daughter.

== Connecticut House of Representatives ==
France was first elected to the Connecticut House of Representatives from the 42nd district, defeating incumbent Timothy Bowles, and took office on January 7, 2015. He ran unopposed for reelection in 2016 and again won reelection in 2018 and 2020, serving four terms until January 4, 2023, when he was succeeded by Keith Denning following redistricting. For the 2021 to 2022 legislative session he was appointed ranking member of the Appropriations Committee. He also served as Ranking Member on the Government Administration and Elections Committee and sat on the Planning and Development Committee, and he chaired the Connecticut General Assembly Conservative Caucus, a group of legislators promoting a limited government and individual liberty agenda that he helped found in 2017.

== Campaigns for Congress ==
In 2022, France won the Republican nomination for Connecticut's 2nd congressional district and faced incumbent Democrat Joe Courtney in the general election on November 8, along with Green Party candidate Kevin Blacker and Libertarian William Hall. Courtney won with 58.22 percent of the vote to France's 40.17 percent. France ran again in 2024 in a rematch with Courtney. During that campaign, in October 2024, a social media post from his campaign about breast cancer self examination drew criticism from Democrats as inappropriate, and his campaign clarified it had been intended as an awareness message modeled on a widely praised advertising campaign. Courtney won the November 2024 general election with about 58 percent of the vote to France's 42 percent.
