= Savet Constantine =

American politician

Member of the Connecticut House of Representatives from the 42nd district
- Incumbent
- Assumed office January 8, 2025
- Preceded by: Keith Denning

Personal details
- Party: Democratic Party
- Website: https://www.savetforthe42nd.com/

Savet Constantine is an American politician and member of the Connecticut House of Representatives since 2025 from the 42nd district, which consists of the town of Wilton and parts of New Canaan and Ridgefield. She lives in Wilton with her husband and two children. Constantine is a marketing executive and has served as president of Wilton PTA.
