= A. K. Otterness =

American science fiction author

A.K. Otterness (born in San Pedro) is an American science fiction author mostly known for his coining of the term Post Pop Pulp. In the early 1990s, he wrote short stories for Horrortech, a small Los Angeles Zine, and assisted in producing a video documentary on the gasoline drinking street children in Ecuador. The short story Resistives published in the illustrated compilation of new fiction MnemoniComix in 1994 is one of many sources cited in the West Coast hackable consumer product alteration movement of the 1990s. In 1995, he moved to Prague for two years before settling in New York. He was a speaker at the Hybrid Theory Conferences at Yale University in 1998, 2000, and 2001.

== Works ==
- Tales from Inside the Boerarrium Vol. I (2007)
  - Boerarrium (1997)
  - The Blue (1994)
  - FogFascists (1992)
  - Integrand (1994)
  - Egg Creetor (1995)
  - Fear of Ze (1994)
  - The Klotho Trigger (1996)
  - Tram-X (1995)
  - Plantaddict (1995)
  - The Static Transcription (1993)
