= Sean Sullivan (naval officer) =

American lawyer and naval officer

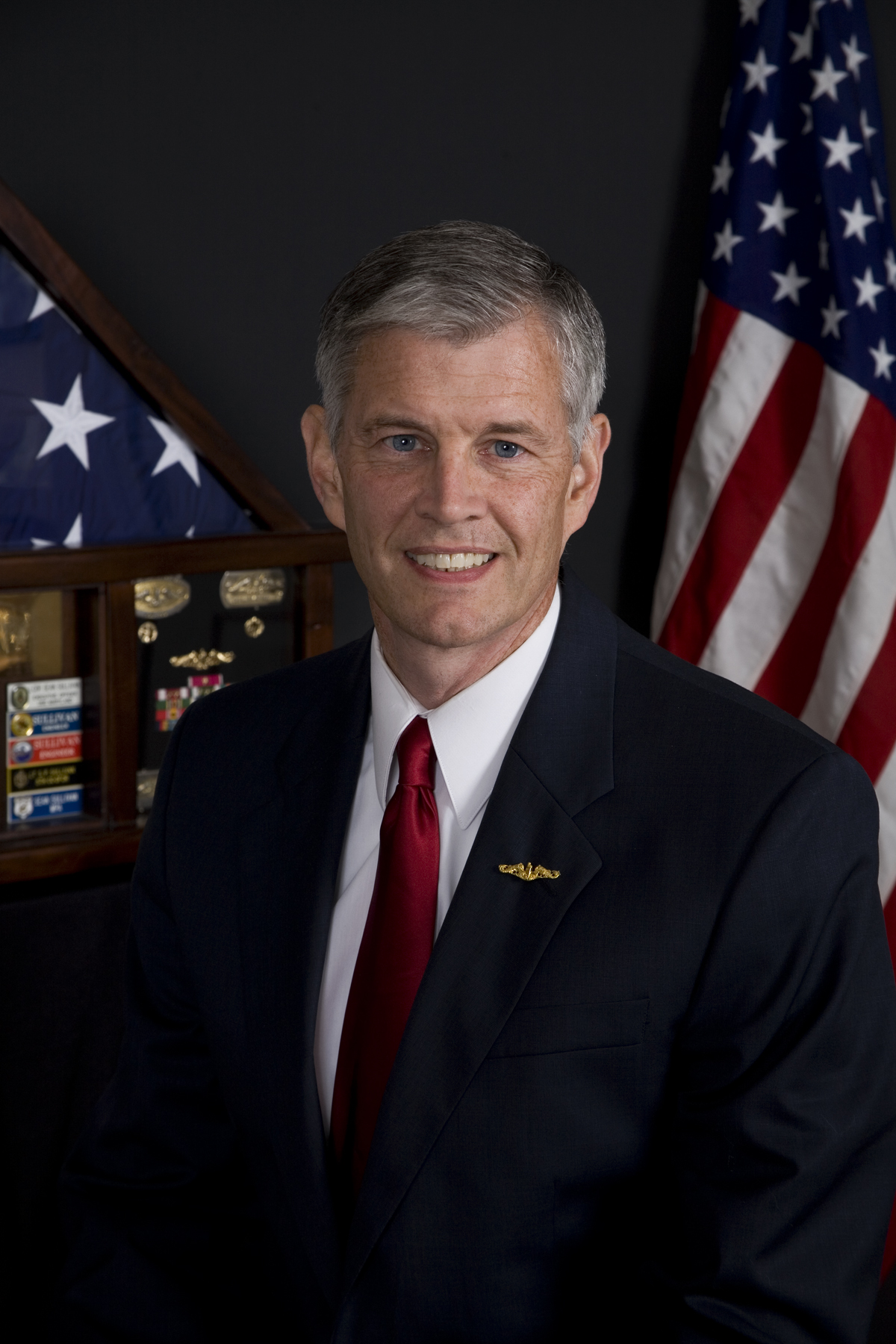
- Sean Sullivan wearing his Submarine Warfare insignia.

Chairman of the Defense Nuclear Facilities Safety Board
- In office January 23, 2017 – February 4, 2018
- President: Donald Trump
- Preceded by: Joyce L. Connery
- Succeeded by: Joseph B. Hamilton (acting)

Member of the Defense Nuclear Facilities Safety Board
- In office August 2, 2012 – February 4, 2018
- President: Barack Obama; Donald Trump
- Preceded by: Larry W. Brown

Member of the Ledyard Town Council
- In office 2009–2012

Personal details
- Born: Sean Patrick Sullivan; November 30, 1958 (age 67) Bridgeport, Connecticut, U.S.
- Party: Republican
- Spouse: Sharon Sullivan
- Education: United States Naval Academy (BS); Naval War College (MA); University of Connecticut (JD)

Military service
- Branch/service: United States Navy
- Years of service: 1976 – 2006
- Rank: Captain
- Commands: USS Jefferson City; Naval Submarine Base New London
- Battles/wars: Gulf War

Sean Patrick Sullivan (born November 30, 1958) is an American lawyer, politician, a retired submarine commander and was commanding officer of the Naval Submarine Base New London. He was the Republican candidate for the United States Congress in Connecticut's 2nd congressional district in 2008.

== Career ==
Sullivan was appointed to the United States Naval Academy in 1976 by recommendation of Senator Lowell Weicker. Upon graduation magna cum laude with a degree in Engineering, he joined the United States Navy submarine force and served there for nearly two decades. He became commander of the USS Jefferson City in 1996. By the time of his retirement from the Navy, he achieved the rank of Captain and was Commanding Officer of the Naval Submarine Base in New London.

He has served on Ledyard's Board of education, the Military Affairs Committee of The Chamber of Commerce of Eastern Connecticut, and is on Governor M. Jodi Rell's Commission of the Economic Diversification of Eastern Connecticut. He holds a M.A. in National Security Affairs from the Naval War College and a J.D. from the University of Connecticut School of Law.

He is an associate lawyer with the firm Brown Jacobson P.C. in Norwich, Connecticut.

He was elected and served on the Ledyard Town Council in Connecticut from 2009 to 2012.

In 2012 he was nominated by President Barack Obama to serve as a member of the Defense Nuclear Facilities Safety Board. He was confirmed by the United States Senate on August 2, 2012 and was sworn in. He was appointed Chairman of the board by President Donald Trump on January 23, 2017 and served as Chairman until he resigned on February 4, 2018.

== 2008 congressional campaign ==
Sullivan accepted the Connecticut Republican Party's nomination to run against Joe Courtney for Connecticut's 2nd congressional district seat on May 9, 2008.

A poll released by the University of Connecticut on September 30, 2008 showed Courtney leading the race among likely voters fifty percent to twenty-three percent with twenty-four percent undecided. Sullivan had the loyalty of two-thirds of registered Republicans but Courtney had 86% of registered Democrats and a two-to-one lead among independents.

Sullivan lost the election to Courtney by a two-to-one margin.

=== Stances on issues ===
Sullivan is a proponent of spending control in Washington and places the blame for increased spending on Congress rather than on President Bush. He believes health care should be administered by the states even if funding comes from the Federal Government. He advocates increasing use of naval power to stabilize the situation in Afghanistan rather than increasing ground troop levels.

He is a strong advocate for nuclear power and supports removing political obstacles to building new plants.
