= Rob Simmons =

American politician (born 1943)

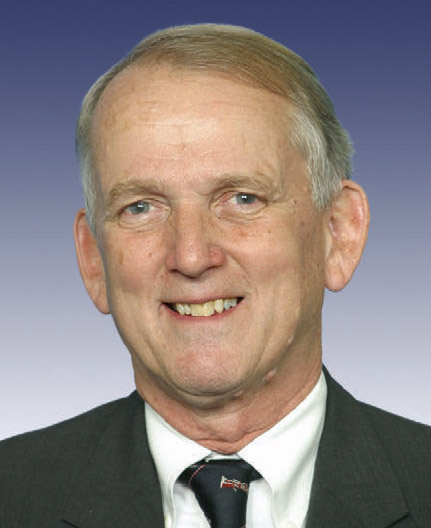

First Selectman of Stonington
- In office November 16, 2015 – November 18, 2019
- Preceded by: George Crouse (acting)
- Succeeded by: Danielle Chesebrough

Member of the U.S. House of Representatives from Connecticut's 2nd district
- In office January 3, 2001 – January 3, 2007
- Preceded by: Sam Gejdenson
- Succeeded by: Joe Courtney

Member of the Connecticut House of Representatives from the 43rd district
- In office 1991–2001
- Preceded by: Frank Turek
- Succeeded by: Diana Urban

Personal details
- Born: Robert Ruhl Simmons; February 11, 1943 (age 83) New York City, New York, U.S.
- Party: Republican
- Spouse: Heidi Simmons
- Education: Haverford College (BA); Harvard University (MPA)
- Awards: Bronze Star (2)

Military service
- Branch/service: United States Army
- Years of service: 1965–1968 (active); 1969–2000 (reserve)
- Rank: Colonel
- Battles/wars: Vietnam War

Robert Ruhl Simmons (born February 11, 1943) is an American politician and retired U.S. Army colonel who served as a member of the United States House of Representatives from 2001 to 2007, representing Connecticut's 2nd congressional district as a Republican.

Simmons unsuccessfully ran as a candidate for the Republican nomination for U.S. Senator from Connecticut in 2010.

Simmons was formerly Chairman of the Yankee Institute for Public Policy. On November 3, 2015, he was elected First Selectman in his hometown of Stonington, Connecticut, which he once represented in Congress. He defeated the incumbent, George Crouse. He did not seek reelection in 2019.

== Military career ==
Simmons was born in New York City and attended Haverford College, graduating in 1965. He enlisted in the United States Army as a private, serving in active duty from 1965 to 1969. He graduated from Infantry Officer Candidate School in 1967 and became a commissioned officer. He fought in the Vietnam War and earned two Bronze Star Medals for his service. He was in Vietnam for 19 months.

Simmons served in the United States Army Reserve as a Military Intelligence Officer from 1969 to 2003, retiring at the rank of full colonel. He led the 434th Military Intelligence Detachment (Strategic) affiliated with Yale University, and in this capacity led the writing of the "Open Source Intelligence Guide for the Military Intelligence Officer." Under his command, the unit was selected as the best small unit in the U.S. Army Reserve in 1996 by the Reserve Officers Association.

== Early political career ==
Simmons joined the Central Intelligence Agency in 1969, working as an Operations Officer for a decade, including five years on assignment overseas in East Asia. He ran the Phu Yen Province Interrogation Center from November 1970 to June 1972, according to an article by Douglas Valentine in Everything You Know is Wrong, and he "mounted numerous paramilitary and psychological warfare operations against" the Viet Cong. Simmons was awarded the CIA's Agency Seal Medal in 1985. In 1979, he earned a Master of Public Administration from Harvard's John F. Kennedy School of Government.

In 1979, he became a staff member for Senator John Chafee of Rhode Island, and then the Staff Director for the United States Senate Select Committee on Intelligence in 1981 under the chairmanship of Senator Barry Goldwater (R-AZ).

Simmons then became a professor of political science at Yale College and at the University of Connecticut. In 1991, he became a member of the Connecticut House of Representatives, replacing incumbent Frank Turek who died in office. He represented the 43rd district before running for Congress.

== U.S. Congressional tenure ==
=== Overview ===
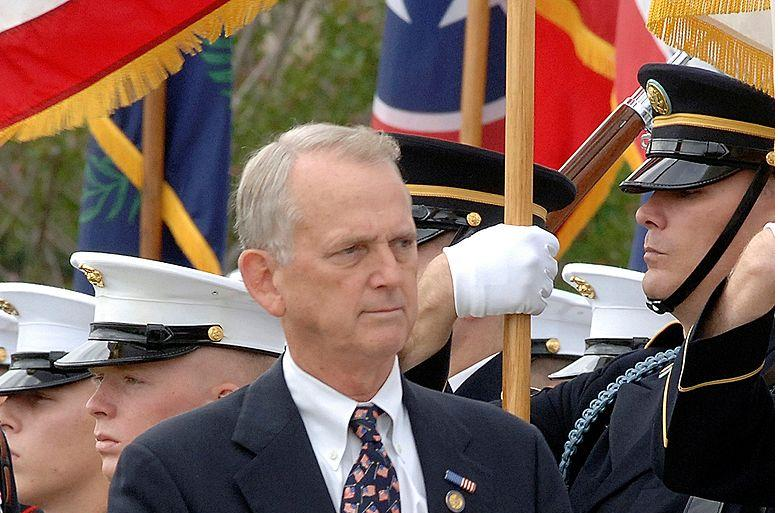
Rob Simmons at a POW–MIA memorial event in 2006

Simmons was a member of the House Armed Services Committee and was involved in issues concerning the district's major defense presence at the Electric Boat submarine shipyard in Groton and the nearby Naval Submarine Base New London. In 2005, the Base Realignment and Closure Commission (BRAC) targeted the United States Navy's Groton submarine base for closure. Simmons led the successful fight to save the base and the BRAC removed it from its closure list on August 24, 2005.

Simmons also served on the House Homeland Security Committee as chairman of the Subcommittee on Intelligence, Information Sharing, and Terrorism Risk Assessment. He was a strong advocate of improved intelligence-sharing among federal, state, and local authorities. Simmons also championed Open Source Intelligence (OSINT) on Capital Hill, where he helped to legally define open source intelligence in the 2006 National Defense Authorization Act, requiring the Department of Defense to establish an OSINT program. He also spearheaded an effort to establish an open source intelligence unit at the Department of Homeland Security.

=== Electoral history ===
Connecticut's 2nd congressional district, 2000:

- Rob Simmons (R) – 114,380 (50.63%)
- Sam Gejdenson (D) – 111,520 (49.37%)

Connecticut's 2nd congressional district, 2002:

- Rob Simmons (R) – 117,434 (54.09%)
- Joe Courtney (D) – 99,674 (45.91%)

Connecticut's 2nd congressional district, 2004:

- Rob Simmons (R) – 165,558 (54.18%)
- Jim Sullivan (D) – 139,987 (45.82%)

Connecticut's 2nd congressional district, 2006:

- Joe Courtney (D) – 121,248 (50.02%)
- Rob Simmons (R) – 121,165 (49.98%)

=== Elections ===
In 2000, Simmons ran for the United States House of Representatives defeating ten-term Democratic incumbent Sam Gejdenson by only 2,000 votes.

Despite being in the most Democratic GOP-held seat in the nation and being targeted by the Democratic Congressional Campaign Committee as a possible pickup in 2002, Simmons fought off a challenge from Democrat Joe Courtney, a former state representative from Vernon, winning 54% to 46%.

In 2004, Simmons defeated his Democratic challenger, Norwich City Councilman Jim Sullivan, by a margin of 54% to 46%.

In 2005, the NRCC listed Simmons as one of their most vulnerable members and his seat was widely seen as a possible Democratic pickup in 2006. Courtney was once again the Democratic nominee in 2006 and the race was considered a toss-up.

On election night Simmons trailed Courtney by 167 votes out of over 242,000 votes cast. This margin was small enough to trigger an automatic recount under Connecticut law. During this recount, elections officials discovered several errors in the original vote. The recount concluded on November 14 giving Courtney an 83-vote victory over Simmons.

As Simmons fared far better than other defeated Republican incumbents it was speculated he would try for a political comeback in 2008, which he did not rule out in conceding the 2006 election to Courtney. However, on March 4, 2007, on an episode of Face the State, he stated that he would not challenge Courtney in 2008. Simmons was the last Republican to garner even 40 percent of the vote in this district until 2022.

== Post congressional career ==
=== Business advocate ===
On February 26, 2007, Simmons was nominated by Connecticut Governor M. Jodi Rell to become the State's first Business Advocate. The Office of the Business Advocate was established as part of the Governor's 2006 "Jobs for the 21st Century" Act (PA 06–83), for the purpose of providing centralized assistance to businesses in the state, and to pro-actively provide assistance to businesses of broader economic significance to the State. He served until December 2008.

=== 2010 U.S. Senate campaign ===
On March 15, 2009, Simmons announced his intention to challenge Senator Chris Dodd for the United States Senate in 2010. A May 2009 poll showed Simmons leading Dodd by six points, with the lead growing to 13 points in a December 2009 poll. Sen. Chris Dodd however announced in January 2010 that he would not be seeking re-election to the U.S. Senate due to high pressure from the Democratic Party leaders, falling poll numbers, and controversy over business dealings with Countrywide Financial.

While Simmons originally led in the polls early on, Linda McMahon gained traction on him in the primary and won at the Republican convention. McMahon, a billionaire, spent more than $22 million through the primary, while Simmons spent under $3 million. Simmons was deeply disappointed by his loss and later suspended his campaign. In late July – two weeks before the primary – however, he re-entered the race by airing TV ads, participating in debates, and accepting interviews with editorial boards. Simmons, however, went on to lose the primary to McMahon. General election polls showed Simmons as the more electable candidate, and McMahon would lose the election by 12%.

== Later career ==
In 2014, he controversially endorsed Democrat Andrew Maynard for re-election to the Connecticut State Senate, despite the fact that Maynard was incapable of fulfilling his duties due to a brain injury that he had suffered. This was done so that Senator Maynard would be able to enjoy the retirement benefits of a state employee, which he otherwise would not have been entitled to as a four-term senator. On the Lee Elci Show radio program, Simmons reflected on how Maynard had introduced his daughter and her husband.

=== Stonington First Selectman ===
In 2015, Simmons was elected First Selectman of Stonington, Connecticut. He was sworn into office on November 16, 2015. In 2019, he did not seek reelection for First Selectman. He was succeeded by Danielle Chesebrough. She took over on November 18, 2019.

== Personal life ==
Simmons is married to the former Edith Heidi Paffard. They have a son, Robert, and a daughter, Jane. He is an Episcopalian.

U.S. House of Representatives
Preceded by Sam Gejdenson	Member of the U.S. House of Representatives from Connecticut's 2nd congressional district 2001–2007	Succeeded by Joe Courtney
U.S. order of precedence (ceremonial)
Preceded by James H. Maloney as Former U.S. Representative	Order of precedence of the United States as Former US Representative	Succeeded by Elizabeth Esty as Former U.S. Representative
