= Sam Gejdenson =

American politician (born 1948)

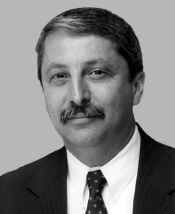

Member of the U.S. House of Representatives from Connecticut's 2nd district
- In office January 3, 1981 – January 3, 2001
- Preceded by: Chris Dodd
- Succeeded by: Rob Simmons

Member of the Connecticut House of Representatives from the 48th district
- In office January 8, 1975 – January 3, 1979
- Preceded by: James Brannen
- Succeeded by: Marty Masters

Personal details
- Born: May 20, 1948 (age 78) Eschwege, Germany
- Party: Democratic
- Spouse: Betsy Henley-Cohn
- Education: Mitchell College; University of Connecticut (BA)

Samuel Gejdenson (born May 20, 1948) is a former United States representative for Connecticut's 2nd congressional district.

== Early life and education ==
Born in a displaced persons camp in Eschwege, Allied-occupied Germany, Gejdenson was the child of a Belarusian father and Lithuanian mother. Gejdenson grew up on a dairy farm in Bozrah, Connecticut, near Norwich. He attended Mitchell College for two years and finished his studies at the University of Connecticut.

From 1970 to 1973, he worked for the FIA Company.

== Political career ==
He was elected as a Democrat to the Connecticut House of Representatives that same year and served two terms. He then worked as the president of the Montessori School in Norwich, Connecticut.

=== Congress ===
Gejdenson won a seat in the United States House of Representatives in November 1980. During his tenure, there was strong disagreement whether or not Gejdenson was a strong advocate for the submarine manufacturer and submarine base located in his congressional district. Twice Gejdenson was offered a seat on the Armed Services Committee, but declined it. Gejdenson's supporters claimed the congressman didn't need to be on the committee to be effective.

Gejdenson served as Chairman of the Subcommittee on Oversight and Investigations of the House Interior Committee (now House Resources Committee). In that capacity, he conducted oversight over the Nuclear Regulatory Commission and the Bureau of Indian Affairs. Beginning in 1989, Gejdenson assumed the Chairmanship of the Subcommittee on International Economic Policy and Trade of the House Foreign Affairs Committee (now International Relations Committee).

Gejdenson focused his subcommittee's work on promoting American exports and streamlining export controls to facilitate high-tech exports. In 1999, Gejdenson became the ranking Democratic member of the full International Relations Committee, where he was a key player in writing legislation cracking down on international human trafficking and to authorize the activities of the State Department.

During his tenure, Gejdenson had a number of very close campaigns for re-election, only crossing the 60 percent mark three times. In 1992, state Senator Edward Munster held Gejdenson to 50 percent of the vote. In 1994, as the Democrats lost control of the House of Representatives, a Gejdenson–Munster rematch produced only a 21-vote victory for Gejdenson. Munster formally challenged the results, which were upheld by the Republican-controlled House Government Reform and Oversight Committee by a vote of 2-1. Munster challenged Gejdenson a third time in 1996, this time coming up six percentage points short.

== Defeat ==
In November 2000, Gejdenson unexpectedly lost his bid for re-election to the 107th Congress to state Representative Rob Simmons. Three major issues may have caused this defeat. In 1998, he had prominently written a counter-letter urging President Clinton to continue his peacemaking. The American Israel Public Affairs Committee, which had circulated a letter among congressmen to oppose putting any pressure on Israel, opposed his re-election despite the fact that he was Jewish. It was alleged that Gejdenson had moved out of the district. It was also alleged by author Jeffrey Benedict that Gejdenson had been an advocate of letting the Pequot Indians build the Foxwoods Casino.

== Post-Congress ==
Gejdenson now resides in Branford, CT and is involved in international trade with his own company, Sam Gejdenson International. He endorsed Joe Courtney in the 2006 election for the seat he once held, in which Courtney defeated Simmons in an extremely close race. Gejdenson is on the board of directors of the National Democratic Institute and was a Commissioner on the United States Commission on International Religious Freedom from 2012-2014.

== See also ==
- List of Jewish members of the United States Congress

U.S. House of Representatives
Preceded by Chris Dodd	Member of the U.S. House of Representatives from Connecticut's 2nd congressional district 1981–2001	Succeeded by Rob Simmons
Preceded by Vic Fazio	Ranking Member of the House Administration Committee; 1997–1999	Succeeded by Steny Hoyer
Preceded by Lee Hamilton	Ranking Member of the House International Relations Committee; 1999–2001	Succeeded by Tom Lantos
U.S. order of precedence (ceremonial)
Preceded by Bob Brady as Former U.S. Representative	Order of precedence of the United States as Former U.S. Representative	Succeeded by Mike Capuano as Former U.S. Representative
