= Joe Courtney (politician) =

American lawyer and politician (born 1953)

Joe Courtney AO
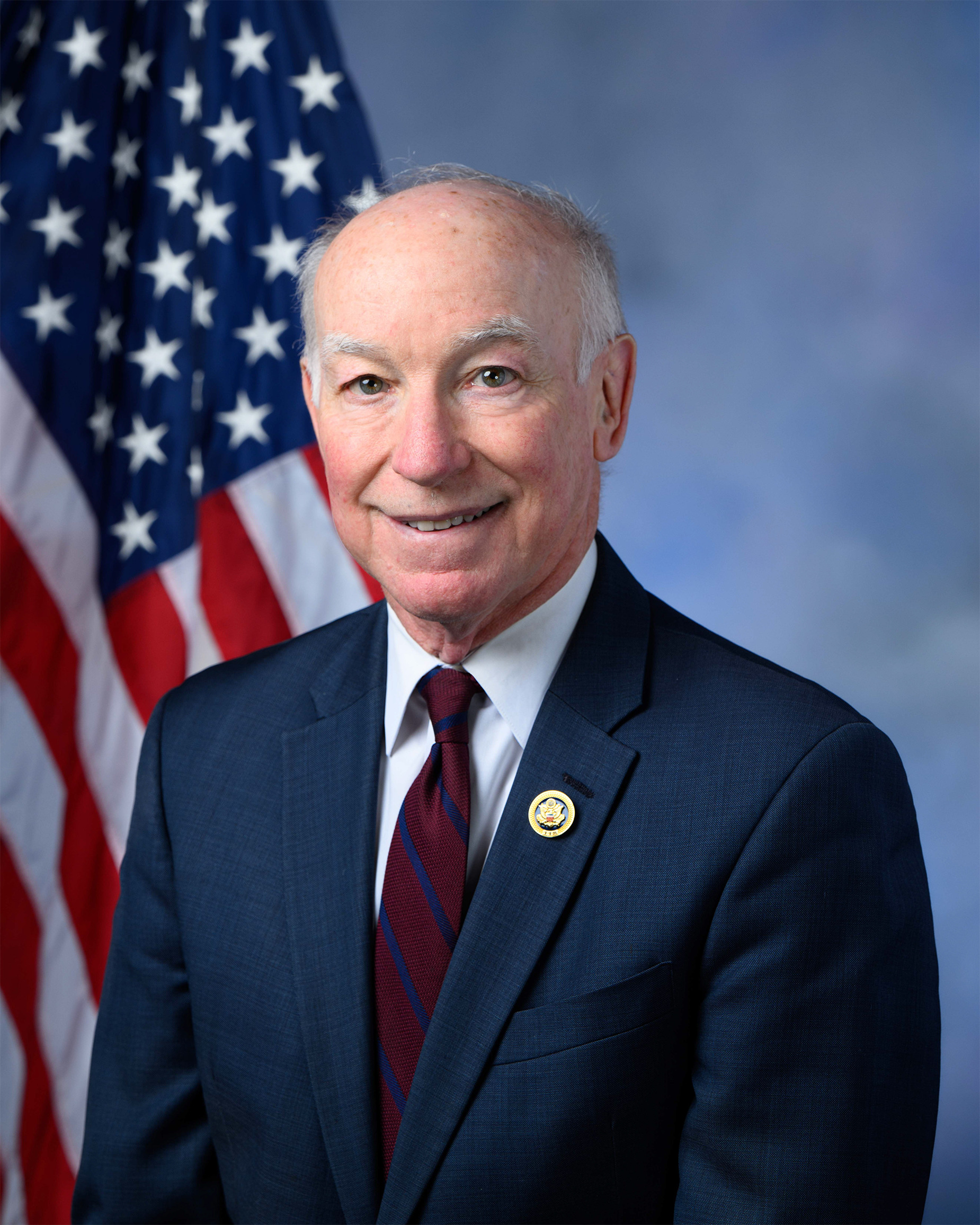
- Official portrait, 2024

Member of the U.S. House of Representatives from Connecticut's 2nd district
- Incumbent
- Assumed office January 3, 2007
- Preceded by: Rob Simmons

Member of the Connecticut House of Representatives from the 56th district
- In office January 7, 1987 – January 4, 1995
- Preceded by: Robert Hurd
- Succeeded by: Thomasina Clemons

Personal details
- Born: Joseph David Courtney; April 6, 1953 (age 73) West Hartford, Connecticut, U.S.
- Party: Democratic
- Spouse: Audrey Courtney
- Children: 2
- Education: Tufts University (BA); University of Connecticut (JD)
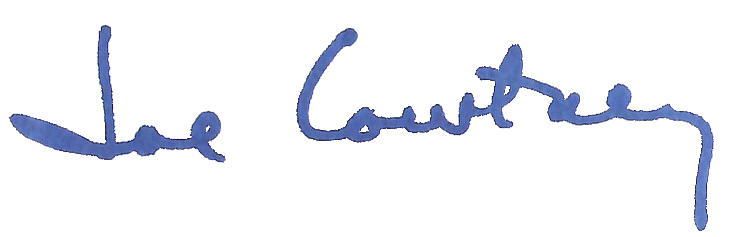
- Signature
- Website: House website Campaign website
- Courtney's voice Courtney supporting the finalized FY2017 National Defense Authorization Act. Recorded December 2, 2016

Joseph David Courtney (born April 6, 1953) is an American lawyer and politician serving as the U.S. representative for Connecticut's 2nd congressional district since 2007. His district encompasses most of the eastern third of the state, including Norwich and New London. A member of the Democratic Party, Courtney served as the Connecticut state representative for the 56th district from 1987 to 1995 and Vernon town attorney from 2003 until 2006.

== Early life and education ==
Courtney grew up in suburban Hartford. In 1975, he graduated with a Bachelor of Arts degree from Tufts University. He earned a Juris Doctor from the University of Connecticut School of Law in 1978.

== Early career ==
After graduating from law school, Courtney worked as a public defender for three years. He became a partner in the law firm Flaherty, Meisler and Courtney, and also served as Town Attorney in Vernon, Connecticut, where he lives.

From 1987 to 1994, Courtney served in the Connecticut House of Representatives, representing Connecticut's 56th district. He chaired the Public Health and Human Service Committee and oversaw the Blue Ribbon Commission on Universal Health Insurance. In 1994, Connecticut Magazine honored him for his bipartisan efforts in the state house.

In 1998, after four years out of office, Courtney made an unsuccessful bid for lieutenant governor. In 2002, he ran for Congress against incumbent Republican Rob Simmons. Courtney did not announce his candidacy or raise money until September 2001; by that time, Simmons had more than $500,000 in campaign funding. Simmons defeated Courtney in the November election, 54% to 46%.

== U.S. House of Representatives ==
=== Elections ===
==== 2006 ====
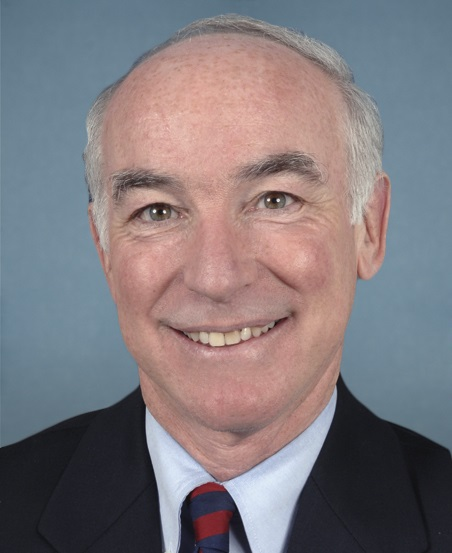
Courtney during the 110th Congress

Courtney challenged Simmons again in 2006, in a race that political strategists projected would be very close. Courtney was declared the winner on Election Day; initial tallies showed him ahead by 167 votes, out of more than 242,000 votes. Under Connecticut law the race qualified for an automatic re-canvass because the winning margin was less than 0.5%. When the recount concluded on November 14, Courtney had 91 votes more than Simmons. The Washington Post later said that the final margin was 83 votes. It was the tightest congressional race of 2006.

==== 2008 ====
Courtney's 2008 Republican challenger was the former commanding officer of the Naval Submarine Base New London, Sean Sullivan. Courtney won the election by a two-to-one margin.

On May 21, 2008, Courtney announced his endorsement of then-U.S. Senator Barack Obama for president.

==== 2010 ====
Courtney was reelected, defeating Republican Janet Peckinpaugh, Green Party nominee Scott Deshefy, and Libertarian Party write-in Dan Reale.

==== 2014 ====
Courtney defeated Republican Lori Hopkins-Cavanagh, a business owner and radio show host from New London, Connecticut.

==== 2016 ====
In 2016, Courtney defeated Republican Daria Novak, Green Party candidate Jonathan Pelto and Libertarian Dan Reale. Novak co-hosted a weekly cable television show, "American Political Zone", and a nationally syndicated radio show, "Vernuccio-Novak Report."

==== 2018 ====
In April 2018, Dan Postemski, an Iraq War veteran and chair of the Hampton Republican Town Committee, announced his plans to challenge Courtney in the 2018 election. Postemski said that he wanted "to bring common sense to budgeting" and that he was "a strong supporter of the 2nd amendment" and would "fight to the death to save it." In a reference to Courtney's participation in a gun-control sit-in, Postemski said, "Joe Courtney has literally sat down on the job, right on the floor of the House. That’s not how a leader makes change." Courtney was reelected by more than 20 points.

=== Tenure ===
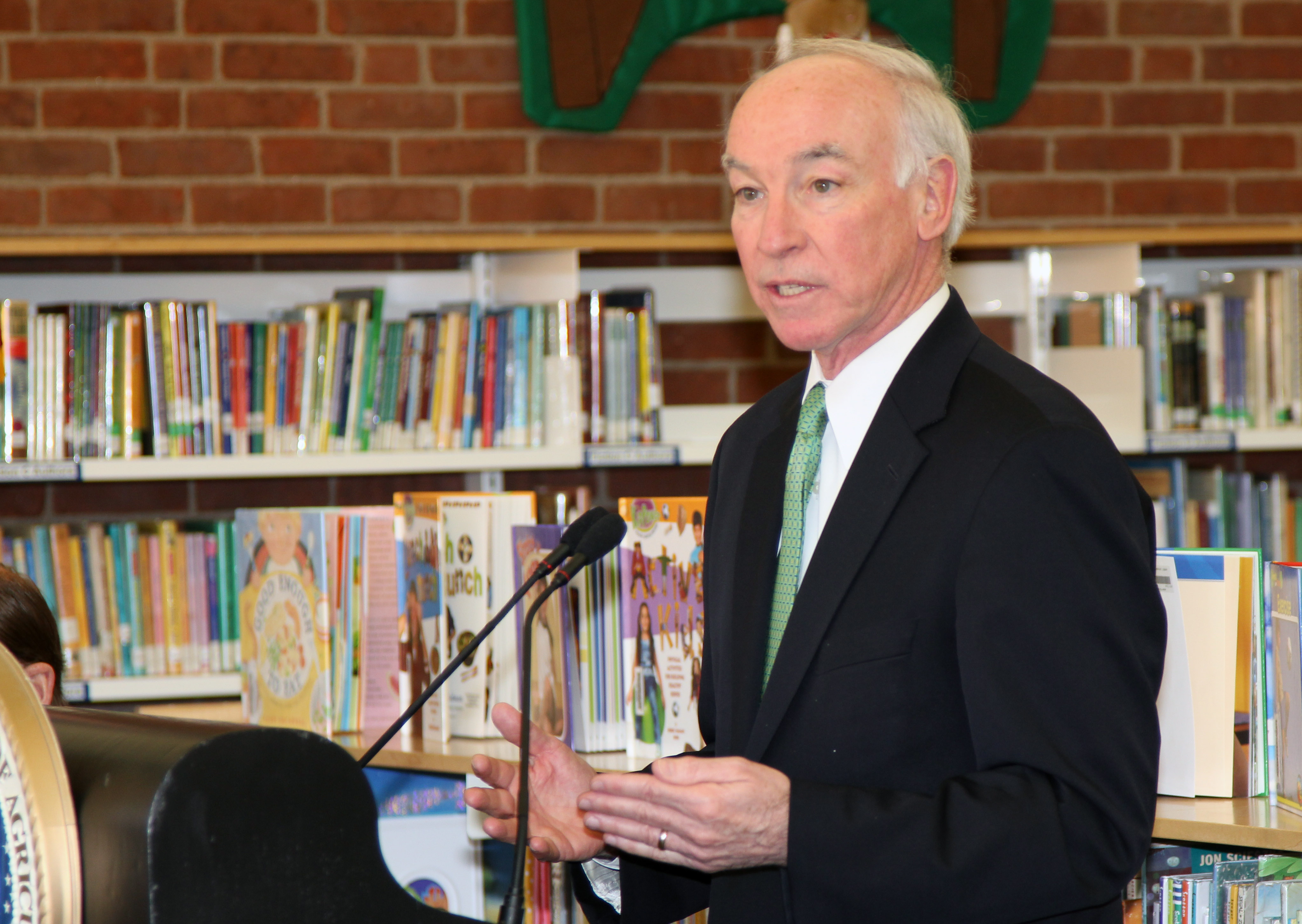
Courtney in 2013

In August 2009, Courtney was criticized for holding a teleconference with voters about health care instead of an in-person town hall. Richard Hanley, graduate journalism director at Quinnipiac University, complained that part of Courtney's job "is to wade into the muck of the process as it is, not as we would like it to be."

Courtney has branded himself as bipartisan and has blamed various government crises on failure to "support a real compromise." In 2012, he said that though recent budget cuts to education were a "little heavy" and the Budget Control Act "ham-handed," he voted for them in a spirit of compromise. "It took guys like me to cross the aisle and make sure we didn't fall off the tracks there as a country," Courtney said.

After seeing Steven Spielberg's film Lincoln in February 2013, Courtney wrote Spielberg a letter pointing out that although the film showed Connecticut House members voting against the 13th Amendment, which abolished slavery, in fact the state's entire congressional delegation had supported the amendment. He asked Spielberg for some kind of acknowledgment of the error, perhaps on the DVD. "It's important that people be aware who saw this movie that we were a state that lost soldiers, were staunch supporters of Lincoln in both elections and, in the case of the Democrat from New Haven, actually voted against his party in support of the amendment," said Courtney, who made his letter public. "The state's good name, I personally feel, was tarnished a bit." His criticism, in the words of the Washington Post, "played well back home in Connecticut", where it occasioned "a number of grateful newspaper editorials", but "set off alarms in showbiz circles: Ballots had just gone out to Oscar voters. Was the congressman trying to influence the Academy Awards in favor of another contender?" The Post noted that "Courtney had a debt to Ben Affleck", who had campaigned for him and whose film Argo was up against Lincoln for Best Picture.

In March 2015, after receiving two phone calls at home from scammers impersonating IRS agents demanding payment of owed taxes, Courtney warned his constituents to be wary of such scams.

A golf game Courtney played with President Obama was highlighted on NPR in June 2015.

In response to purported Republican hostility toward Muslims, Democratic National Committee Vice Chair Debbie Wasserman Schultz urged Democratic members of Congress to invite Muslims as their guests to Obama's State of the Union address in January 2016. Accordingly, Courtney invited Mohammed Qureshi, president of the Baitul Aman Mosque, an Ahmadiyya house of worship in Connecticut. The invitation garnered considerable media attention.

=== Political positions ===
As of 2023, Courtney was ranked the most bipartisan Member of Congress from Connecticut, according to the Lugar Center.

==== AUKUS Security Agreement ====
Through his work as Chair and then Ranking Member of the Seapower and Projection Forces Subcommittee, Rep. Courtney has advanced the AUKUS security agreement between the United States, the United Kingdom, and Australia.

In the 2023 National Defense Authorization Act, Courtney successfully co-lead a bipartisan amendment with Rep. Mike Ghallager to establish a joint training pipeline for Australian Navy servicemembers to skill up alongside U.S. Navy sailors in the mechanics of Virginia-class nuclear-powered submarines.

In the 2024 National Defense Authorization Act, Courtney again successfully lead bipartisan efforts to authorize the historic sale of three Virginia-class nuclear-powered submarines to the Australian Government, the training of Australian private sector defense personnel, the integration of Australian financial contributions into the U.S. defense industrial base, and the sharing of technology and information between the three AUKUS nations to safely streamline security cooperation. The sale of Virginia-class submarines will mark the first time since the launch of the USS Nautilus in 1958 that the U.S. will sell conventionally-armed, nuclear-powered submarines to another nation.

==== Order of Australia ====
In October 2024, Rep. Courtney was appointed as an Honorary Officer in the General Division of the Order of Australia (the equivalent of the Knight Bachelor in Australia's previous Imperial Awards) for his extraordinary service to Australia in the advancement of the AUKUS security agreement and his leadership as Co-Chair of the Friends of Australia Congressional Caucus, a bipartisan caucus which seeks to "expand and enrich the strong United States-Australian partnership".

In November 2024, Courtney was presented with an official award for his appointment into the Order of Australia. He joined a select group of non-Australian citizens to receive this honor, including Senator Roy Blunt, former Co-Chair of the Friends of Australia Caucus, Admiral Harry Harris, former U.S. Ambassador to South Korea and Commander of the Indo-Pacific Command, and General David Petraeus, former Director of the Central Intelligence Agency.

==== Taxes ====
In 2019, Courtney introduced H.R. 748, the Middle Class Health Benefits Tax Repeal Act – a bill to remove the 40% excise tax on certain employer-sponsored health insurance plans. After the bill passed the House by a 419-6 vote, Courtney released a statement about out-of-pocket costs being too “unaffordable for families, even those with insurance.”

In 2024, Courtney wrote an op-ed in Roll Call stating he will stand against renewed calls to tax employers sponsored insurance by the Republican Study Committee and Project 2025.

==== Gun control ====
Along with other members of Congress who demanded that the House pass stricter gun-control legislation, Courtney took part in a sit-in on the House floor on June 22, 2016.

==== Health care ====
In 2010, Courtney was the leading voice in the House against the so-called "Cadillac tax" on high-dollar health plans, part of the funding proposed for the Patient Protection and Affordable Care Act.

==== Inflation ====
Courtney plans to lower the cost of living by “holding giant grocery corporations accountable for inexcusably raising costs at the expense of US farmers while they rake in record profits.” He also voted to expand the Low-Income Housing Tax Credit to create more housing and lower the cost of prescription drugs.

==== Iraq War ====
In March 2008, Courtney called U.S. policy in Iraq "two-headed." While the Bush administration asked troops "to serve and sacrifice on behalf of Iraq's fledgling government," Iraqi leaders were friendly with Iran. "The White House," he wrote, "needs to work with Congress to construct a reasonable long term security agreement with Iraq that address Iraq's relations with Iran."

==== Iran nuclear deal ====
On August 6, 2015, Courtney issued a statement in support of Obama's Iran deal, officially known as the Joint Comprehensive Plan of Action. "I believe that the Joint Comprehensive Plan of Action is the best option for our nation and the international community to prevent Iran from gaining a nuclear weapons capability," he wrote.

When President Trump decided to withhold certification of the Iran nuclear agreement, Courtney issued a statement in which he claimed that Trump's move "directly contradicts the opinion of our nation's highest military leadership" and "puts us at odds with our closest allies such as the U.K., France and Germany, and undermines our country's ability to credibly execute a multilateral diplomatic resolution of the crisis in the Korean peninsula."

==== Israel ====
Courtney supports supplying Israel with weapons to defend itself, but also believes any U.S. aid must comply with the Foreign Assistance Act (FAA) which prohibits the U.S. from providing offensive arms to a country that restricts humanitarian aid. Courtney also supports the UN approved ceasefire plan to ensure a just and lasting peace in the region.

==== Military ====
Courtney is known for his success at delivering funding for his district's submarine bases, and has acquired the nickname "Two-Sub Joe" for having made possible the construction of two new submarines. In 2016, the Hartford Courant endorsed him primarily because he had "brought home defense jobs."

==== Prescription drugs ====
CT Public reported that Courtney supported a provision of the Inflation Reduction Act passed in 2022 to give Medicare authority to negotiate prescription drug prices, beginning with 10 drugs in 2026. Courtney is also a cosponsor of the Lowering Drug Costs for American Families Act, a bill to extend lower drug prices to all Americans with private insurance as well as Medicare beneficiaries.

==== Reproductive healthcare ====
CT Mirror reported that he voted to codify Roe v. Wade as a State Representative in Connecticut and cosponsored the Women’s Health Protection Act of 2023 as a U.S. Representative to restore Roe v. Wade nationwide.

==== Trump travel ban ====
In March 2017, Courtney protested Trump's revised executive order temporarily restricting travel from six Muslim-majority countries. He maintained that America's "moderate allies from Muslim-majority nations" had "repeatedly warned President Trump that these rash orders damage our standing to lead the anti-ISIS coalition" and that the executive order would result in a "backlash...overseas." Courtney added that the U.S. is "a nation of opportunity and a nation of immigrants, and this blanket ban on entry from six nations could mean that best and the brightest from those countries, and other Muslim-majority countries will no longer view the United States as an option for making a better life. This ban is not only a prize propaganda tool for terrorists who want to hurt us, it hurts American prestige abroad, and harms American businesses, schools, and institutions that rely on the hard work of immigrants from around the world, including these six countries."

==== Syria ====
In 2023, Courtney voted against H.Con.Res. 21 which directed President Joe Biden to remove U.S. troops from Syria within 180 days.

=== Committee assignments ===
For the 119th Congress:

- Committee on Armed Services
  - Subcommittee on Seapower and Projection Forces (Ranking Member)
  - Subcommittee on Tactical Air and Land Forces
- Committee on Education and Workforce
  - Subcommittee on Health, Employment, Labor, and Pensions
  - Subcommittee on Higher Education and Workforce Development

=== Caucus memberships ===
- Congressional Arts Caucus
- Congressional Equality Caucus
- Afterschool Caucuses
- Blue Collar Caucus
- Congressional NextGen 9-1-1 Caucus
- Congressional Ukraine Caucus
- Veterinary Medicine Caucus

== Election history ==
=== 2006 ===
US House election, 2006: Connecticut District 2
| Party | Candidate | Votes | % |
|---|---|---|---|
| Democratic | Joe Courtney | 121,248 | 50.02% |
| Republican | Rob Simmons (incumbent) | 121,165 | 49.98% |
| Turnout | | 242,413 | 100% |

=== 2008 ===
US House election, 2008: Connecticut District 2
| Party | Candidate | Votes | % |
|---|---|---|---|
| Democratic | Joe Courtney (incumbent) | 212,148 | 65.7% |
| Republican | Sean Sullivan | 104,574 | 32.4% |
| Green | G. Scott Deshefy | 6,300 | 1.9% |
| Write-in | | 19 | 0.0% |
| Turnout | | 323,041 | 100% |

=== 2010 ===
US House election, 2010: Connecticut District 2
| Party | Candidate | Votes | % |
|---|---|---|---|
| Democratic | Joe Courtney (incumbent) | 147,748 | 59.9% |
| Republican | Janet Peckinpaugh | 95,671 | 38.8% |
| Green | G. Scott Deshefy | 3,344 | 1.4% |
| Turnout | | 246,763 | 100% |

=== 2012 ===
Connecticut 2nd Congressional District Election, 2012
| Party | Candidate | Votes | % |
|---|---|---|---|
| Democratic | Joe Courtney (incumbent) | 204,708 | 68.2% |
| Republican | Paul Formica | 88,103 | 29.4% |
| Green | Colin Bennett | 3,638 | 1.2% |
| Libertarian | Daniel Reale | 3,511 | 1.2% |
| Turnout | | 299,960 | 100% |

=== 2014 ===
Connecticut 2nd Congressional District Election, 2014
| Party | Candidate | Votes | % |
|---|---|---|---|
| Democratic | Joe Courtney (incumbent) | 141,948 | 61.6% |
| Republican | Lori Hopkins-Cavanagh | 83,386 | 36.2% |
| Green | William Clyde | 2,602 | 1.1% |
| Libertarian | Daniel Reale | 2,543 | 1.1% |
| Turnout | | 230,479 | 100% |

=== 2016 ===
Connecticut 2nd Congressional District Election, 2016
| Party | Candidate | Votes | % |
|---|---|---|---|
| Democratic | Joe Courtney (incumbent) | 208,818 | 63.2% |
| Republican | Daria Novak | 111,149 | 33.7% |
| Green | Jonathan Pelto | 5,332 | 1.6% |
| Libertarian | Daniel Reale | 4,949 | 1.5% |
| Turnout | | 330,257 | 100% |

=== 2018 ===
Connecticut 2nd Congressional District Election, 2018
| Party | Candidate | Votes | % |
|---|---|---|---|
| Democratic | Joe Courtney (incumbent) | 179,731 | 62.2% |
| Republican | Dan Postemski | 102,483 | 35.4% |
| Green | Michelle Louise Bicking | 3,595 | 1.2% |
| Libertarian | Dan Reale | 3,305 | 1.1% |
| Turnout | | 289,114 | 100% |

=== 2020 ===
Connecticut 2nd Congressional District Election, 2020
| Party | Candidate | Votes | % |
|---|---|---|---|
| Democratic | Joe Courtney (incumbent) | 217,982 | 59.4% |
| Republican | Justin Anderson | 140,340 | 38.2% |
| Green | Cassandra Martineau | 4,949 | 1.35% |
| Libertarian | Dan Reale | 3,901 | 1.06% |
| Turnout | | 367,181 | 100% |

=== 2022 ===
Connecticut 2nd Congressional District Election, 2022
| Party | Candidate | Votes | % |
|---|---|---|---|
| Democratic | Joe Courtney (incumbent) | 165,946 | 58.2% |
| Republican | Mike France | 114,506 | 40.2% |
| Green | Kevin Blacker | 2,439 | 0.9% |
| Libertarian | William Hall | 2,140 | 0.7% |
| Total votes | | 285,031 | 100% |

=== 2024 ===
Connecticut 2nd Congressional District Election, 2024
| Party | Candidate | Votes | % |
|---|---|---|---|
| Democratic | Joe Courtney (incumbent) | 218,162 | 58.0% |
| Republican | Mike France | 157,878 | 42.0% |
| Write-in | | 7 | 0.00% |
| Total votes | | 376,047 | 100% |

Party political offices
| Preceded by Joe Ganim | Democratic nominee for Lieutenant Governor of Connecticut; 1998 | Succeeded by George Jepsen |
U.S. House of Representatives
| Preceded by Rob Simmons | Member of the U.S. House of Representatives from Connecticut's 2nd congressional district 2007–present | Incumbent |
U.S. order of precedence (ceremonial)
| Preceded by Steve Cohen | United States representatives by seniority 58th | Succeeded by Hank Johnson |
| Preceded by Hank Johnson | Order of precedence of the United States | Succeeded by Yvette Clarke |
