= 2024 United States House of Representatives elections in Connecticut =

- November 5, 2024

All 5 Connecticut seats to the United States House of Representatives
	Majority party	Minority party
Party	Democratic	Republican
Last election	5	0
Seats won	5	0
Seat change	Steady	Steady
Popular vote	1,000,415	687,319
Percentage	58.85%	40.43%
Swing	▲1.65%	▼1.30%

Democratic
40–50%
50–60%
60–70%
70–80%
80–90%
Republican
50–60%
60–70%

The 2024 United States House of Representatives elections in Connecticut were held on November 5, 2024, to elect the five U.S. representatives from the state of Connecticut, one from each of the state's five congressional districts. The elections coincided with the 2024 U.S. presidential election, other elections to the House of Representatives, elections to the United States Senate, and various state and local elections. The primary elections took place on August 13, 2024.

== Overview ==
=== By district ===
Results of the 2024 United States House of Representatives elections in Connecticut by district:

District	Democratic		Republican		Others†		Total		Result
District	Votes	%	Votes	%	Votes	%	Votes	%	Result
District 1	208,649*	63.1%	115,065	34.8%	6,768	2.0%	330,482	100.0%	Democratic hold
District 2	218,162	58.0%	157,878	42.0%	7	0.002%	376,047	100.0%	Democratic hold
District 3	193,684	58.88%	135,113*	41.08%	126	0.04%	328,923	100.0%	Democratic hold
District 4	200,791	61.1%	122,793	37.3%	5,273	1.6%	328,857	100.0%	Democratic hold
District 5	180,268*	53.40%	157,258	46.58%	79	0.02%	337,605	100.0%	Democratic hold
Total	1,001,554*	58.8%	688,107*	40.4%	12,253	0.7%	1,701,914	100.0%	

- *Includes votes for candidates on more than one party line
- † Does not include fusion vote counts -- see individual districts for details

== District 1 ==
2024 Connecticut's 1st congressional district election
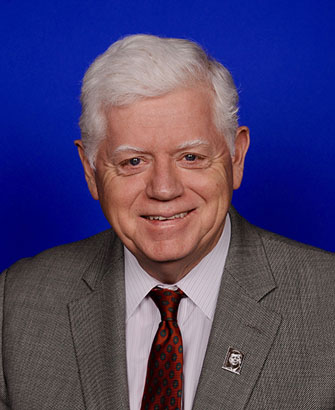

Nominee	John Larson	Jim Griffin
Party	Democratic	Republican
Alliance	Working Families
Popular vote	208,649	115,065
Percentage	63.13%	34.82%
- Municipality results Larson 40–50% 50–60% 60–70% 70–80% 80–90% Griffin 50–60% 60–70%
U.S. Representative before election
John Larson
Democratic
Elected U.S. Representative
John Larson
Democratic

The 1st district is located in the north-central part of the state and includes the capital city, Hartford. The incumbent was Democrat John Larson, who was re-elected with 61.3% of the vote in 2022.

=== Democratic primary ===
==== Nominee ====
- John Larson, incumbent U.S. representative

==== Endorsements ====
John Larson

Organizations

- AIPAC
- Humane Society Legislative Fund

Labor unions

- National Education Association

==== Fundraising ====
Campaign finance reports as of December 31, 2023
Candidate	Raised	Spent	Cash on hand
John Larson (D)	$726,215	$747,425	$343,260
Source: Federal Election Commission

=== Republican primary ===
==== Nominee ====
- Jim Griffin

=== General election ===
==== Predictions ====
Source	Ranking	As of
The Cook Political Report	Solid D	February 2, 2023
Inside Elections	Solid D	March 10, 2023
Sabato's Crystal Ball	Safe D	February 23, 2023
Elections Daily	Safe D	June 8, 2023
CNalysis	Solid D	November 16, 2023

==== Results ====
2024 Connecticut's 1st congressional district election
Party	Candidate	Votes	%
Democratic	John Larson (incumbent)	208,649	63.13
Republican	Jim Griffin	115,065	34.82
Green	Mary L. Sanders	6,768	2.05
Total votes		330,482	100.00
Democratic hold			

== District 2 ==
2024 Connecticut's 2nd congressional district election
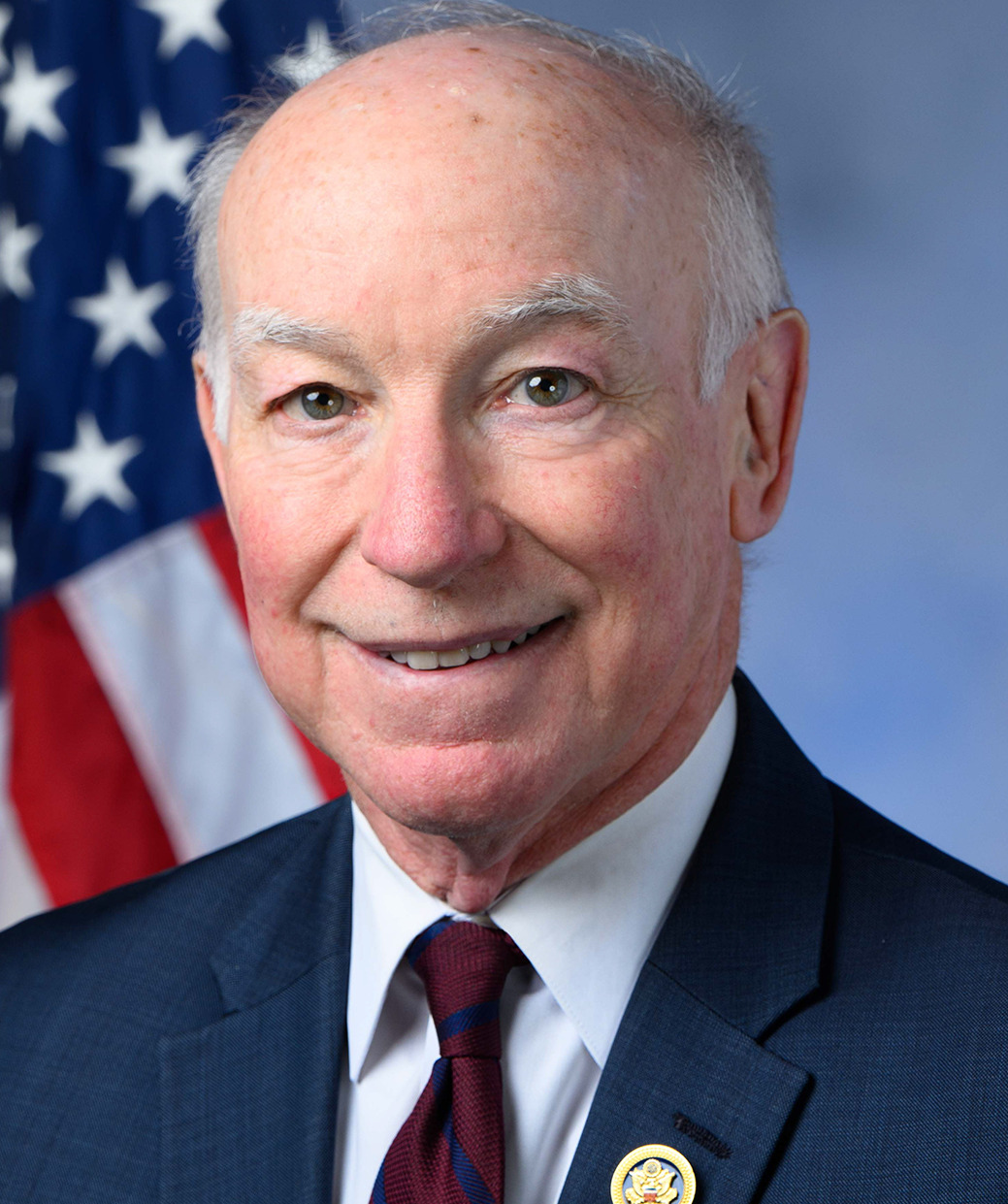

Nominee	Joe Courtney	Mike France
Party	Democratic	Republican
Popular vote	218,162	157,878
Percentage	58.01%	41.98%
- Municipality results Courtney 50–60% 60–70% 70–80% France 50–60% 60–70%
U.S. Representative before election
Joe Courtney
Democratic
Elected U.S. Representative
Joe Courtney
Democratic

The 2nd district is located in the eastern part of the state and includes New London and Groton. The incumbent was Democrat Joe Courtney, who was re-elected with 58.2% of the vote in 2022.

=== Democratic primary ===
==== Nominee ====
- Joe Courtney, incumbent U.S. representative

==== Endorsements ====
Joe Courtney

Organizations

- AIPAC
- Humane Society Legislative Fund
- J Street PAC
- Sierra Club

Labor unions

- National Education Association

==== Fundraising ====
Campaign finance reports as of December 31, 2023
Candidate	Raised	Spent	Cash on hand
Joe Courtney (D)	$525,911	$264,504	$433,514
Source: Federal Election Commission

=== Republican primary ===
==== Nominee ====
- Mike France, former state representative (2015–2023) and nominee for this district in 2022

==== Endorsements ====
Mike France

Organizations

- Log Cabin Republicans PAC

==== Fundraising ====
Campaign finance reports as of December 31, 2023
Candidate	Raised	Spent	Cash on hand
Mike France (R)	$221,721 (Note: $10,000 of this total was self-funded by France)	$168,776	$61,795
Source: Federal Election Commission

=== General election ===
==== Predictions ====
Source	Ranking	As of
The Cook Political Report	Solid D	February 2, 2023
Inside Elections	Solid D	March 10, 2023
Sabato's Crystal Ball	Safe D	February 23, 2023
Elections Daily	Safe D	June 8, 2023
CNalysis	Solid D	November 16, 2023

==== Results ====
2024 Connecticut's 2nd congressional district election
Party	Candidate	Votes	%
Democratic	Joe Courtney (incumbent)	218,162	58.01
Republican	Mike France	157,878	41.98
Write-in		7	0.00
Total votes		376,047	100.00
Democratic hold			

== District 3 ==
2024 Connecticut's 3rd congressional district election
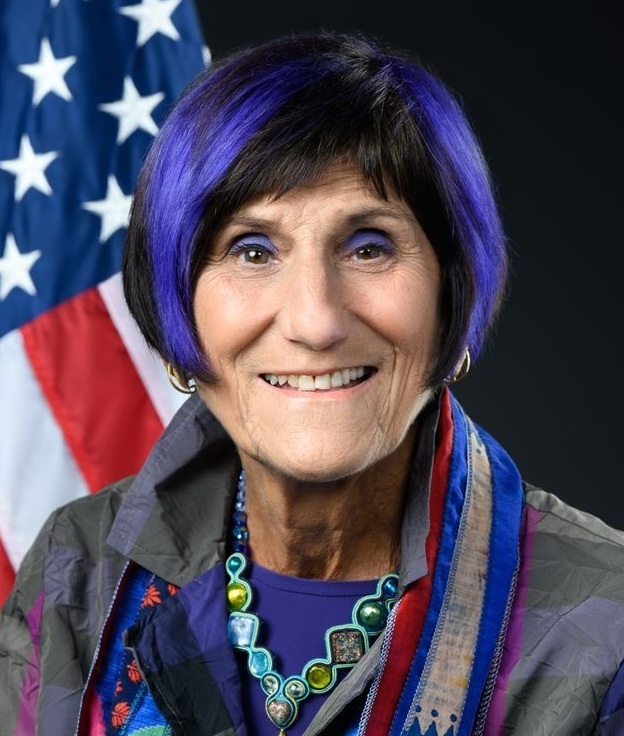

Nominee	Rosa DeLauro	Michael Massey
Party	Democratic	Republican
Popular vote	193,684	135,113
Percentage	58.88%	41.07%
- Municipality results DeLauro 50–60% 60–70% 70–80% 80–90% Massey 50–60% 60–70%
U.S. Representative before election
Rosa DeLauro
Democratic
Elected U.S. Representative
Rosa DeLauro
Democratic

The 3rd district is located in the south-central part of the state and includes New Haven. The incumbent was Democrat Rosa DeLauro, who was re-elected with 56.8% of the vote in 2022.

=== Democratic primary ===
==== Nominee ====
- Rosa DeLauro, incumbent U.S. representative

==== Endorsements ====
Rosa DeLauro

U.S representatives

- Gabby Giffords, U.S. representative from Arizona's 8th congressional district (2007–2012)

Organizations

- AIPAC
- Everytown for Gun Safety Action Fund
- Feminist Majority PAC
- Giffords
- Humane Society Legislative Fund
- J Street PAC
- Natural Resources Defense Council
- Planned Parenthood Action Fund
- Population Connection Action Fund

Labor unions

- National Education Association

==== Fundraising ====
Campaign finance reports as of December 31, 2023
Candidate	Raised	Spent	Cash on hand
Rosa DeLauro (D)	$756,046	$673,282	$196,219
Source: Federal Election Commission

=== Republican primary ===
==== Nominee ====
- Michael Massey

=== General election ===
==== Predictions ====
Source	Ranking	As of
The Cook Political Report	Solid D	February 2, 2023
Inside Elections	Solid D	March 10, 2023
Sabato's Crystal Ball	Safe D	February 23, 2023
Elections Daily	Safe D	June 8, 2023
CNalysis	Solid D	November 16, 2023

==== Results ====
2024 Connecticut's 3rd congressional district election
Party	Candidate	Votes	%
Democratic	Rosa DeLauro (incumbent)	193,684	58.88
Republican	Michael Massey	130,095	39.55
Independent Party	Michael Massey	5,018	1.52
Total	Michael Massey	135,113	41.07
Write-in		126	0.04
Total votes		328,923	100.00
Democratic hold			

== District 4 ==
2024 Connecticut's 4th congressional district election
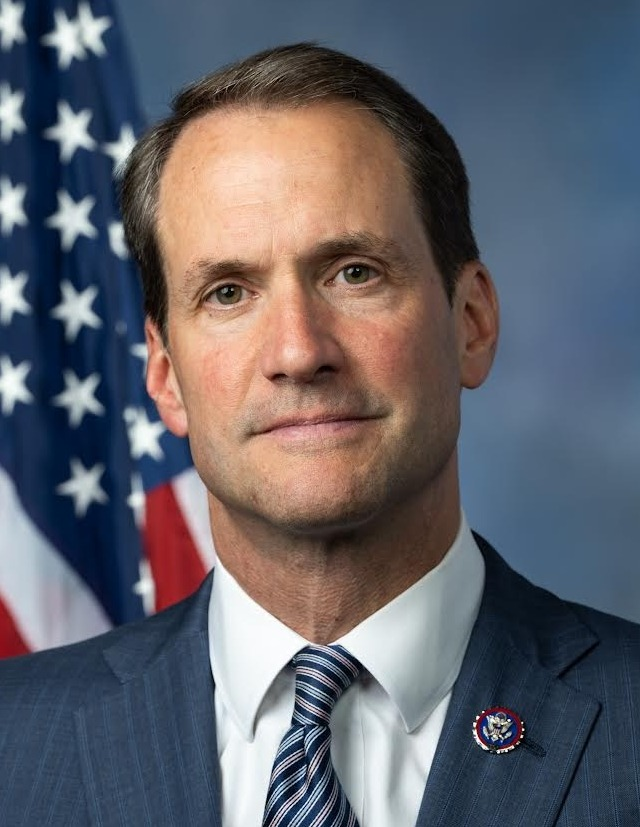

Nominee	Jim Himes	Michael Goldstein
Party	Democratic	Republican
Popular vote	200,791	122,793
Percentage	61.06%	37.34%
- Municipality results Himes 50–60% 60–70% 70–80% Goldstein 50–60%
U.S. Representative before election
Jim Himes
Democratic
Elected U.S. Representative
Jim Himes
Democratic

The 4th district is located in the south western part of the state and includes Greenwich and Stamford. The incumbent was Democrat Jim Himes, who was re-elected with 59.4% of the vote in 2022.

=== Democratic primary ===
==== Nominee ====
- Jim Himes, incumbent U.S. representative

==== Endorsements ====
Jim Himes

Organizations

- AIPAC
- Humane Society Legislative Fund

Labor unions

- National Education Association

==== Fundraising ====
Campaign finance reports as of June 30, 2024
Candidate	Raised	Spent	Cash on hand
Jim Himes (D)	$1,564,132	$948,007	$2,275,422
Source: Federal Election Commission

=== Republican primary ===
==== Nominee ====
- Michael Goldstein, member of the Greenwich Representative Town Meeting from the 10th district (2023–present) and candidate for this district in 2020 and 2022

==== Eliminated in primary ====
- Bob MacGuffie, self-published author

==== Fundraising ====
Campaign finance reports as of December 31, 2023
Candidate	Raised	Spent	Cash on hand
Bob MacGuffie (R)	$32,307	$5,215	$27,092
Michael Goldstein (R)	$1,103	$43	$1,060
Dan Miressi (R)	$252	$9.89	$242.11
Source: Federal Election Commission

==== Results ====
Republican primary results
Party	Candidate	Votes	%
Republican	Michael Goldstein	4,312	53.7
Republican	Bob MacGuffie	3,713	46.3
Total votes		8,025	100.0

=== General election ===
==== Predictions ====
Source	Ranking	As of
The Cook Political Report	Solid D	February 2, 2023
Inside Elections	Solid D	March 10, 2023
Sabato's Crystal Ball	Safe D	February 23, 2023
Elections Daily	Safe D	June 8, 2023
CNalysis	Solid D	November 16, 2023

==== Results ====
2024 Connecticut's 4th congressional district election
Party	Candidate	Votes	%
Democratic	Jim Himes (incumbent)	200,791	61.06
Republican	Michael Goldstein	122,793	37.34
Independent Party	Benjamin Wesley	5,273	1.60
Total votes		328,857	100.00
Democratic hold			

== District 5 ==
2024 Connecticut's 5th congressional district election
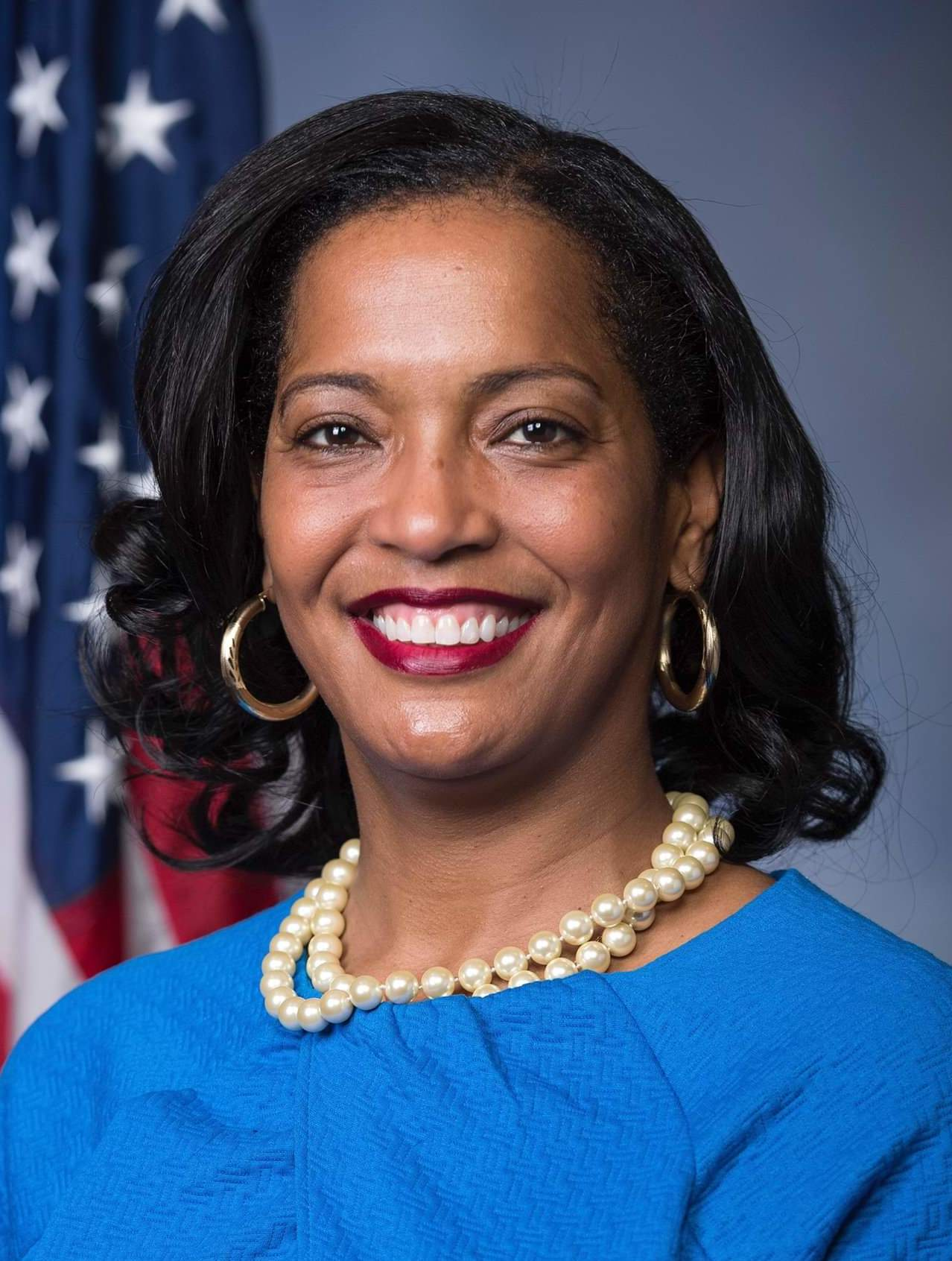

Nominee	Jahana Hayes	George Logan
Party	Democratic	Republican
Alliance	Working Families
Popular vote	179,129	156,470
Percentage	53.40%	46.58%
- Municipality results Hayes 50–60% 60–70% 70–80% Logan 50–60% 60–70%
U.S. Representative before election
Jahana Hayes
Democratic
Elected U.S. Representative
Jahana Hayes
Democratic

The 5th district is located in the north western part of the state and includes Danbury and Waterbury. The incumbent was Democrat Jahana Hayes, who was re-elected with 50.4% of the vote in 2022.

=== Democratic primary ===
==== Nominee ====
- Jahana Hayes, incumbent U.S. representative

==== Endorsements ====
Jahana Hayes

Governors

- Gretchen Whitmer, governor of Michigan (2019–present)

U.S representatives

- Seth Moulton, MA-06 (2015–present)

Organizations

- EMILY's List
- Everytown for Gun Safety Action Fund
- Feminist Majority PAC
- Giffords
- Humane Society Legislative Fund
- J Street PAC
- Jewish Democratic Council of America
- League of Conservation Voters
- NARAL Pro-Choice America
- National Women's Political Caucus
- Planned Parenthood Action Fund
- Population Connection Action Fund
- Sierra Club

Labor unions

- National Education Association

Political parties

- Connecticut Democratic Party

==== Fundraising ====
Campaign finance reports as of December 31, 2023
Candidate	Raised	Spent	Cash on hand
Jahana Hayes (D)	$1,185,884	$515,486	$1,030,641
Source: Federal Election Commission

=== Republican primary ===
==== Nominee ====
- George Logan, former state senator and nominee for this district in 2022

==== Endorsements ====
George Logan

U.S representatives

- Mike Johnson, speaker of the House (2023–present) from LA-04 (2017–present)

Organizations

- Congressional Leadership Fund
- Log Cabin Republicans PAC
- Tea Party Express
- U.S. Chamber of Commerce (post-primary)

==== Fundraising ====
Campaign finance reports as of December 31, 2023
Candidate	Raised	Spent	Cash on hand
Michelle Botelho (R)	$8,853	$4,542	$7,410
George Logan (R)	$426,326	$66,691	$371,731
Source: Federal Election Commission

=== General election ===
==== Predictions ====
Source	Ranking	As of
The Cook Political Report	Lean D	February 2, 2023
Inside Elections	Lean D	March 10, 2023
Sabato's Crystal Ball	Lean D	February 23, 2023
Elections Daily	Likely D	March 22, 2024
CNalysis	Very Likely D	November 16, 2023

=== Polling ===
Jahana Hayes vs. George Logan

Poll source	Date(s) administered	Sample size (Note: Key: A – all adults RV – registered voters LV – likely voters V – unclear)	Margin of error	Jahana Hayes (D)	George Logan (R)	Undecided
Emerson College (Note: Poll commissioned by The Hill, Nexstar, WCTX and WTNH)	October 24–26, 2024	620 (LV)	± 3.9%	49%	45%	6%
Emerson College (Note: Poll commissioned by The Hill, WCTX and WTNH)	October 9–11, 2024	725 (LV)	± 3.6%	49%	46%	6% (Note: "Someone else" with 1%)
Public Opinion Strategies (Note: Poll commissioned by Logan's campaign)	November 11–13, 2023	400 (LV)	± 4.9%	43%	41%	16%

==== Results ====
2024 Connecticut's 5th congressional district election
Party	Candidate	Votes	%
Democratic	Jahana Hayes	171,337	50.75
Working Families	Jahana Hayes	8,931	2.65
Total	Jahana Hayes (incumbent)	180,268	53.40
Republican	George Logan	157,258	46.58
Write-in		79	0.02
Total votes		337,605	100.00
Democratic hold			

== Notes ==
Partisan clients
