= Joseph Crisco Jr. =

American politician (1934–2025)

Member of the Connecticut Senate from the 17th district
- In office January 6, 1993 – January 4, 2017
- Preceded by: Gary A. Hale
- Succeeded by: George Logan

Personal details
- Born: June 2, 1934 New Haven, Connecticut, U.S.
- Died: February 14, 2025 (aged 90)
- Party: Democratic
- Spouse: Pat Crisco
- Children: 6
- Education: Trinity College; University of Connecticut (BSc)

Joseph Crisco Jr. (June 2, 1934 – February 14, 2025) was an American politician who served in the Connecticut State Senate from 1993 to 2017, representing the 17th district.

Crisco held a Bachelor of Science degree in accounting from the University of Connecticut and studied at the graduate level at Trinity College in Hartford. Raised in New Haven, he lived in Woodbridge.

Crisco was first elected to the 17th district of the Connecticut Senate in 1992, serving for twelve terms until 2017 when he lost re-election to George Logan. He died on February 14, 2025, age 90.
