= Connecticut's 5th congressional district =

U.S. House district for Connecticut

Coordinates: 41°41′40″N 73°12′36″W

- Interactive map of district boundaries since January 3, 2023
- Representative: Jahana Hayes; D–Wolcott
- Area: 1,282 mi^{2} (3,320 km^{2})
- Distribution: 85.79% urban; 14.21% rural
- Population (2025): 737,745
- Median household income: $99,864
- Ethnicity: 63.3% White; 20.9% Hispanic; 6.7% Black; 4.1% Two or more races; 3.8% Asian; 1.2% other
- Cook PVI: D+3

Connecticut's 5th congressional district is a congressional district in the U.S. state of Connecticut. Located in the western part of the state and spanning across parts of Fairfield, Litchfield, New Haven, and Hartford Counties, the district runs from Meriden and New Britain in central Connecticut, westward to Danbury and the surrounding Housatonic Valley, encompassing the Farmington Valley, Upper Naugatuck River Valley, and the Litchfield Hills. The district also includes most of Waterbury.

The district is currently represented by Democrat Jahana Hayes. With a Cook Partisan Voting Index rating of D+3, it is the least Democratic district in Connecticut, a state with an all-Democratic congressional delegation.

== History ==
In the early 20th century, the 5th congressional district included Waterbury, Litchfield County, and the Naugatuck Valley. It did not include any portion of Fairfield or Hartford counties and did not include the City of Meriden.

From 1964 to 1990, the 5th congressional district included many towns in Fairfield County which are now located in the 4th congressional district, such as Wilton, Monroe, Ridgefield, and Shelton. It also included the lower Naugatuck River Valley towns of Ansonia, Derby, Seymour, and Naugatuck which are now in the 3rd congressional district.

The current 5th congressional district was created in 2002 due to reapportionment following the 2000 U.S. census. Due to slow population growth, Connecticut lost a seat and the old Waterbury-based 5th district was merged with the New Britain-based 6th district. However, the merged district contained more of the old 6th's territory.

Although historically Republican, the 5th congressional district has been trending Democratic since 2004. John Kerry carried the district with 49.3% of the vote, a margin of 1,112 votes in the 2004 presidential election. Barack Obama carried the district in 2008 with 56.3% of the vote and in 2012 with 53.5% of the vote.

== Composition ==
For the 118th and successive Congresses (based on redistricting following the 2020 census), Connecticut's 5th district contains portions of four planning regions and 40 municipalities.

Capitol Planning Region (6)

Avon, Canton, Farmington, New Britain, Plainville, Simsbury

Naugatuck Valley Planning Region (10)

Bethlehem, Cheshire, Middlebury, Plymouth, Southbury, Thomaston, Waterbury (part; also 3rd), Watertown, Wolcott, Woodbury

Northwest Hills Planning Region (16)

Burlington, Canaan, Cornwall, Goshen, Harwinton, Kent, Litchfield, Morris, Norfolk, North Canaan, Roxbury, Salisbury, Sharon, Torrington (part; also 1st) Warren, Washington

South Central Connecticut Planning Region (1)

Meriden

Western Connecticut Planning Region (7)

Bridgewater, Brookfield, Danbury, New Fairfield, New Milford, Newtown, Sherman

=== Voter registration ===
Voter registration and party enrollment as of October 30, 2012
| Party | Active voters | Inactive voters | Total voters | Percentage |
|---|---|---|---|---|
| Democratic | 108,601 | 4,720 | 113,321 | 29.96% |
| Republican | 89,242 | 3,554 | 92,796 | 24.53% |
| Minor parties | 3,728 | 152 | 3,880 | 1.03% |
| Unaffiliated | 159,433 | 8,782 | 168,215 | 44.489% |
| Total | 361,004 | 17,208 | 378,212 | 100% |

== Recent election results from statewide races ==
| Year | Office | Results |
|---|---|---|
| 2008 | President | Obama 56% - 42% |
| 2010 | Senate | Blumenthal 50% - 49% |
| 2010 | Governor | Foley 55% - 44% |
| 2012 | President | Obama 54% - 46% |
| 2012 | Senate | Murphy 51% - 49% |
| 2014 | Governor | Foley 52% - 44% |
| 2016 | President | Clinton 50% - 46% |
| 2016 | Senate | Blumenthal 58% - 40% |
| 2018 | Senate | Murphy 55% - 44% |
| 2018 | Governor | Stefanowski 50% - 45% |
| 2018 | Attorney General | Hatfield 51% - 48% |
| 2020 | President | Biden 55% - 44% |
| 2022 | Senate | Blumenthal 52% - 48% |
| 2022 | Governor | Lamont 50% - 49% |
| 2022 | Secretary of the State | Thomas 50% - 48% |
| 2022 | Treasurer | Arora 50% - 47% |
| 2022 | Comptroller | Fay 50.5% - 49.5% |
| 2022 | Attorney General | Tong 52% - 47% |
| 2024 | President | Harris 52% - 46% |
| 2024 | Senate | Murphy 55% - 44% |

== Recent elections ==
Connecticut's 5th Congressional District Election, 2006
| Party | Candidate | Votes | % | ±% |
|---|---|---|---|---|
| Democratic | Chris Murphy | 122,980 | 56% | |
| Republican | Nancy Johnson (incumbent) | 94,824 | 44% | |
| Democratic gain from Republican | | Swing | | |
| Turnout | | 217,804 | 100% | |

Connecticut's 5th Congressional District Election, 2008
| Party | Candidate | Votes | % | ±% |
|---|---|---|---|---|
| Democratic | Chris Murphy (incumbent) | 178,377 | 59% | |
| Republican | David Cappiello | 117,585 | 39% | |
| Independent | Thomas Winn | 3,066 | 1% | |
| Democratic hold | | Swing | | |
| Turnout | | 301,345 | 100% | |

Connecticut's 5th Congressional District Election, 2010
| Party | Candidate | Votes | % | ±% |
|---|---|---|---|---|
| Democratic | Chris Murphy (incumbent) | 122,879 | 54% | |
| Republican | Sam Caligiuri | 104,402 | 46% | |
| Democratic hold | | Swing | | |
| Turnout | | 227,281 | 100% | |

Connecticut's 5th Congressional District Election, 2012
| Party | Candidate | Votes | % | ±% |
|---|---|---|---|---|
| Democratic | Elizabeth Esty | 142,201 | 52% | |
| Republican | Andrew Roraback | 133,256 | 48% | |
| Democratic hold | | Swing | | |
| Turnout | | 275,457 | 100% | |

Connecticut's 5th Congressional District Election, 2014
| Party | Candidate | Votes | % | ±% |
|---|---|---|---|---|
| Democratic | Elizabeth Esty (incumbent) | 113,564 | 53% | |
| Republican | Mark Greenberg | 97,767 | 46% | |
| Independent | John Pistone | 1,970 | 1% | |
| Democratic hold | | Swing | | |
| Turnout | | 213,301 | 100% | |

Connecticut's 5th Congressional District Election, 2016
| Party | Candidate | Votes | % | ±% |
|---|---|---|---|---|
| Democratic | Elizabeth Esty (incumbent) | 179,252 | 58% | |
| Republican | Clay Cope | 129,801 | 42% | |
| Democratic hold | | Swing | | |
| Turnout | | 309,053 | 100% | |

Connecticut's 5th Congressional District Election, 2018
| Party | Candidate | Votes | % |
|---|---|---|---|
| Democratic | Jahana Hayes | 151,225 | 55.9 |
| Republican | Manny Santos | 119,426 | 44.1 |
| Independent | John Pistone (write-in) | 13 | 0.0 |
| Total votes | | 270,664 | 100.0 |
| Democratic hold | | | |

Connecticut's 5th Congressional District Election, 2020
| Party | Candidate | Votes | % |
|---|---|---|---|
| Democratic | Jahana Hayes (incumbent) | 192,484 | 55.1% |
| Republican | David X. Sullivan | 151,988 | 43.5% |
| Independent | Bruce Walczak | 5,052 | 1.4% |
| Total votes | | 349,524 | 100.0 |
| Democratic hold | | | |

Connecticut's 5th Congressional District Election, 2022
| Party | Candidate | Votes | % |
|---|---|---|---|
| Democratic | Jahana Hayes (incumbent) | 127,483 | 50.39% |
| Republican | George Logan | 125,641 | 49.61% |
| Total votes | | 253,124 | 100.0 |
| Democratic hold | | | |

Connecticut's 5th Congressional District Election, 2024
| Party | Candidate | Votes | % |
|---|---|---|---|
| Democratic | Jahana Hayes (incumbent) | 180,268 | 53.4% |
| Republican | George Logan | 157,258 | 46.6% |
| Total votes | | 337,526 | 100.0 |
| Democratic hold | | | |

Connecticut's 5th Congressional District Election, 2026
| Party | Candidate | Votes | % |
|---|---|---|---|
| Democratic | Jahana Hayes (incumbent) | TBD | TBD |
| Republican | Chris Shea | TBD | TBD |
| Independent | Jonathan DeBarros (write-in) | TBD | TBD |
| Total votes | | TBD | TBD |
| Democratic hold | | | |

== List of members representing the district ==
District organized from Connecticut's at-large congressional district in 1837.

| Representative | Party | Service | Cong ress(es) | Electoral history | Location |
|---|---|---|---|---|---|
District created March 4, 1837
| Lancelot Phelps (Hitchcockville) | Democratic | March 4, 1837 – March 3, 1839 | 25th | redistricted from the at-large district and re-elected in 1837. Retired. | |
| Truman Smith (Litchfield) | Whig | March 4, 1839 – March 3, 1843 | 26th 27th | Elected in 1839. Re-elected in 1840. Retired. | |
District eliminated following the 1840 census
District organized from Connecticut's at-large congressional district in 1913
| William Kennedy (Naugatuck) | Democratic | March 4, 1913 – March 3, 1915 | 63rd | Elected in 1912. Lost re-election. | |
| James P. Glynn (Winsted) | Republican | March 4, 1915 – March 3, 1923 | 64th 65th 66th 67th | Elected in 1914. Re-elected in 1916. Re-elected in 1918. Re-elected in 1920. Lost re-election. | |
| Patrick B. O'Sullivan (Derby) | Democratic | March 4, 1923 – March 3, 1925 | 68th | Elected in 1922. Lost re-election. | |
| James P. Glynn (Winsted) | Republican | March 4, 1925 – March 6, 1930 | 69th 70th 71st | Elected in 1924. Re-elected in 1926. Re-elected in 1928. Died. | |
| Vacant | | March 6, 1930 – November 4, 1930 | 71st | | |
| Edward W. Goss (Waterbury) | Republican | November 4, 1930 – January 3, 1935 | 71st 72nd 73rd | Elected to finish Glynn's term. Re-elected in 1930. Re-elected in 1932. Lost re-election. | |
| J. Joseph Smith (Prospect) | Democratic | January 3, 1935 – November 4, 1941 | 74th 75th 76th 77th | Elected in 1934. Re-elected in 1936. Re-elected in 1938. Re-elected in 1940. Resigned when appointed Judge of the U.S. Court of Appeals. | |
| Vacant | | November 4, 1941 – January 20, 1942 | 77th | | |
| Joseph E. Talbot (Naugatuck) | Republican | January 20, 1942 – January 3, 1947 | 77th 78th 79th | Elected to finish Smith's term. Re-elected in 1942. Re-elected in 1944. Retired to run for Governor of Connecticut. | |
| James T. Patterson (Watertown) | Republican | January 3, 1947 – January 3, 1959 | 80th 81st 82nd 83rd 84th 85th | Elected in 1946. Re-elected in 1948. Re-elected in 1950. Re-elected in 1952. Re-elected in 1954. Re-elected in 1956. Lost re-election. | |
| John S. Monagan (Waterbury) | Democratic | January 3, 1959 – January 3, 1973 | 86th 87th 88th 89th 90th 91st 92nd | Elected in 1958. Re-elected in 1960. Re-elected in 1962. Re-elected in 1964. Re-elected in 1966. Re-elected in 1968. Re-elected in 1970. Lost re-election. | |
| Ronald A. Sarasin (Beacon Falls) | Republican | January 3, 1973 – January 3, 1979 | 93rd 94th 95th | Elected in 1972. Re-elected in 1974. Re-elected in 1976. Retired to run for Governor of Connecticut. | |
| William R. Ratchford (Danbury) | Democratic | January 3, 1979 – January 3, 1985 | 96th 97th 98th | Elected in 1978. Re-elected in 1980. Re-elected in 1982. Lost re-election. | |
| John G. Rowland (Waterbury) | Republican | January 3, 1985 – January 3, 1991 | 99th 100th 101st | Elected in 1984. Re-elected in 1986. Re-elected in 1988. Retired to run for Governor of Connecticut. | |
| Gary Franks (Waterbury) | Republican | January 3, 1991 – January 3, 1997 | 102nd 103rd 104th | Elected in 1990. Re-elected in 1992. Re-elected in 1994. Lost re-election. | |
| James H. Maloney (Danbury) | Democratic | January 3, 1997 – January 3, 2003 | 105th 106th 107th | Elected in 1996. Re-elected in 1998. Re-elected in 2000. Lost re-election. | |
| Nancy Johnson (New Britain) | Republican | January 3, 2003 – January 3, 2007 | 108th 109th | Redistricted from the 6th district and re-elected in 2002. Re-elected in 2004. Lost re-election. | 2003–2013 |
| Chris Murphy (Cheshire) | Democratic | January 3, 2007 – January 3, 2013 | 110th 111th 112th | Elected in 2006. Re-elected in 2008. Re-elected in 2010. Retired to run for U.S. Senator. | 2003–2013 |
| Elizabeth Esty (Cheshire) | Democratic | January 3, 2013 – January 3, 2019 | 113th 114th 115th | Elected in 2012. Re-elected in 2014. Re-elected in 2016. Retired. | 2013–2023 |
| Jahana Hayes (Wolcott) | Democratic | January 3, 2019 – present | 116th 117th 118th 119th | Elected in 2018. Re-elected in 2020. Re-elected in 2022. Re-elected in 2024. Re-elected in 2026. | 2013–2023 |
| Jahana Hayes (Wolcott) | Democratic | January 3, 2019 – present | 116th 117th 118th 119th | Elected in 2018. Re-elected in 2020. Re-elected in 2022. Re-elected in 2024. Re-elected in 2026. | 2023–present |

== See also ==
- Connecticut's congressional districts
- List of United States congressional districts
