= 2020 United States House of Representatives elections in Connecticut =

- November 3, 2020

All 5 Connecticut seats to the United States House of Representatives
	Majority party	Minority party
Party	Democratic	Republican
Last election	5	0
Seats won	5	0
Seat change	Steady	Steady
Popular vote	1,060,231	682,662
Percentage	59.83%	38.52%
Swing	▼1.81%	▲0.74%

Democratic
40–50%
50–60%
60–70%
70–80%
80–90%
Republican
40–50%
50–60%
60–70%

The 2020 United States House of Representatives elections in Connecticut was held on November 3, 2020, to elect the five U.S. representatives from the state of Connecticut, one from each of the state's five congressional districts. The elections coincided with the 2020 U.S. presidential election, other elections to the House of Representatives, elections to the United States Senate, and various state and local elections.

== Overview ==
The table below shows the total number and percentage of votes, as well as the number of seats won by each political party in the election for the United States House of Representatives in Connecticut.

United States House of Representatives elections in Connecticut, 2020
Party	Votes	Percentage	Seats
Democratic	1,022,792	57.69%	5
Working Families Party	38,176	2.15%	0
Subtotal Democratic & WFP	1,060,968	59.84%	5
Republican	676,650	38.17%	0
Independent Party of Connecticut	16,729	0.94%	0
Subtotal Republican & IPOC	693,379	39.11%	0
Green Party	14,658	0.83%	0
Libertarian	3,903	0.22%	0
Others	19	< 0.01%	0
Total	1,772,927	100.00%	5

- The Democratic candidates in the First, Second, Third and Fifth Districts were cross-endorsed by the Connecticut Working Families Party.
- The Republican candidates in the Third, Fourth and Fifth Districts were cross-endorsed by the Independent Party of Connecticut.

Popular vote
Democratic	59.84%
Republican	39.11%
Other	1.05%

House seats
Democratic	100.00%

=== By district ===
District	Democratic		Republican		Others†		Total		Result
District	Votes	%	Votes	%	Votes	%	Votes	%	Result
District 1	222,668*	63.76%	122,111	34.96%	4,458	1.28%	349,237	100.0%	Democratic hold
District 2	218,119*	59.38%	140,356	38.21%	8,872	2.41%	367,347	100.0%	Democratic hold
District 3	203,265*	58.73%	137,598*	39.76%	5,240	1.51%	346,103	100.0%	Democratic hold
District 4	224,432	62.22%	136,274*	37.78%	10	<0.01%	360,716	100.0%	Democratic hold
District 5	192,484*	55.07%	157,040*	44.93%	0	N/A	349,524	100.0%	Democratic hold
Total	1,060,968	59.84%	693,379	39.11%	18,580	1.05%	1,772,927	100.0%	

- *Includes votes for major party candidates on more than one party line
- † Does not include fusion vote counts -- see individual districts for details

== District 1 ==
2020 Connecticut's 1st congressional district election
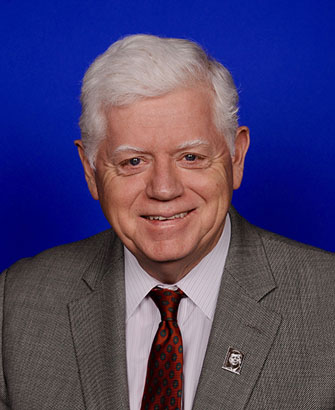

Nominee	John B. Larson	Mary Fay
Party	Democratic	Republican
Alliance	Working Families
Popular vote	222,668	122,111
Percentage	63.8%	35.0%
- Larson: 40–50% 50–60% 60–70% 70–80% 80–90% >90% Fay: 40–50% 50–60% 60–70%
U.S. Representative before election
John B. Larson
Democratic
Elected U.S. Representative
John B. Larson
Democratic

The 1st district encompasses Hartford and the surrounding areas. The incumbent was Democrat John B. Larson, who was re-elected with 63.9% of the vote in 2018.

=== Democratic primary ===
==== Candidates ====
===== Declared =====
- John B. Larson, incumbent U.S. representative

=== Republican primary ===
==== Candidates ====
===== Declared =====
- Mary Fay, West Hartford town councilwoman
- James Griffin

==== Primary results ====
Republican primary results
Party	Candidate	Votes	%
Republican	Mary Fay	8,908	57.3
Republican	Jim Griffin	6,624	42.7
Total votes		15,532	100.0

=== General election ===
==== Debate ====
2020 Connecticut's 1st congressional district debate
No.	Date	Host	Moderator	Link	Republican	Democratic	Green
Key: P Participant A Absent N Not invited I Invited W Withdrawn							
Key: P Participant A Absent N Not invited I Invited W Withdrawn					John B. Larson	Mary Fay	Tom McCormick
1	Oct. 22, 2020	League of Women Voters of Greater Hartford; West Hartford Community Interactive	Carole Mulready		P	P	P

==== Predictions ====
Source	Ranking	As of
The Cook Political Report	Safe D	July 2, 2020
Inside Elections	Safe D	June 2, 2020
Sabato's Crystal Ball	Safe D	July 2, 2020
Politico	Safe D	April 19, 2020
Daily Kos	Safe D	June 3, 2020
RCP	Safe D	June 9, 2020
Niskanen	Safe D	June 7, 2020

==== Results ====
2020 Connecticut's 1st congressional district election
Party	Candidate	Votes	%
Democratic	John B. Larson	213,001	61.0
Working Families	John B. Larson	9,667	2.8
Total	John B. Larson (incumbent)	222,668	63.8
Republican	Mary Fay	122,111	35.0
Green	Tom McCormick	4,458	1.3
Total votes		349,237	100.0
Democratic hold			

== District 2 ==
2020 Connecticut's 2nd congressional district election
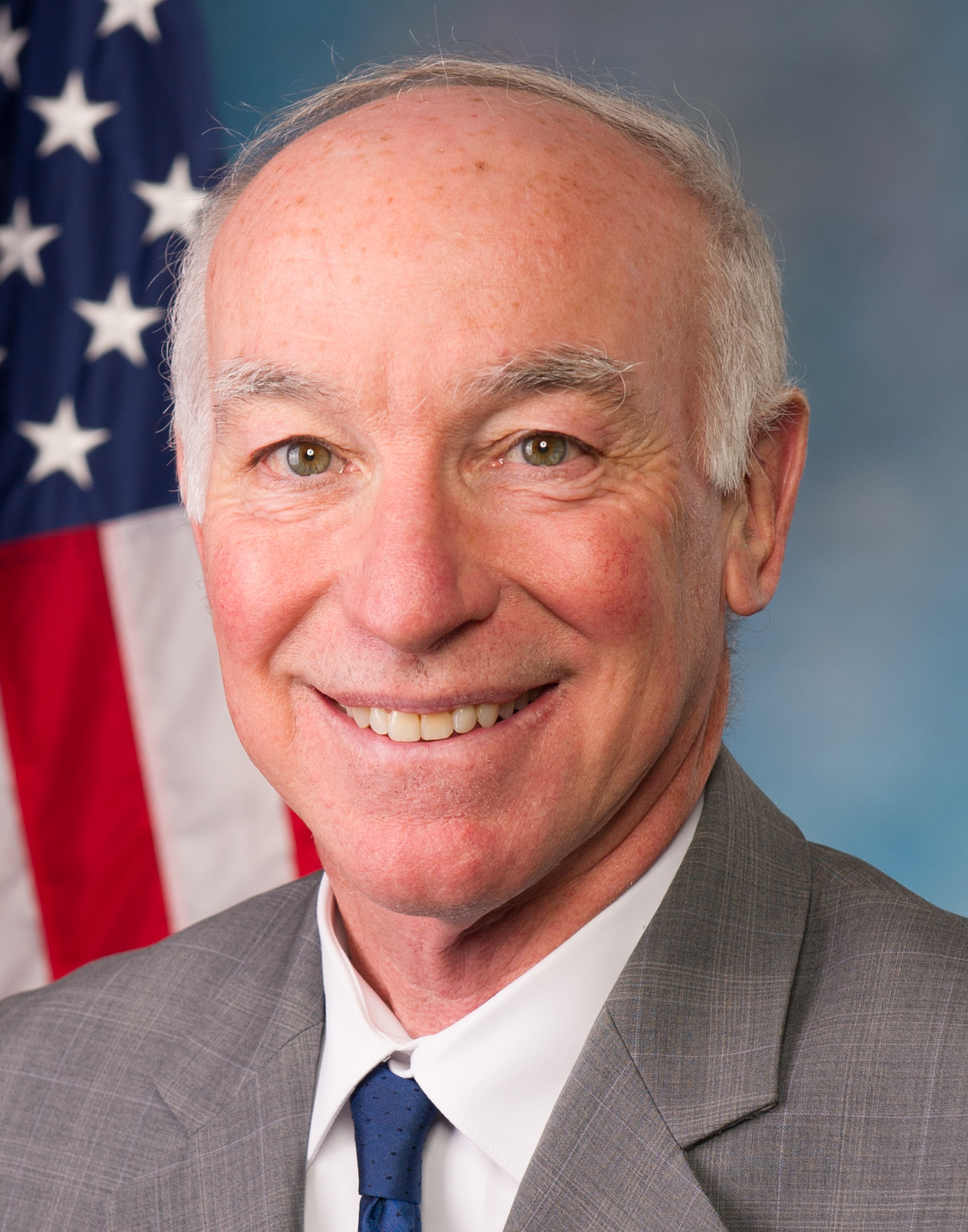

Nominee	Joe Courtney	Justin Anderson
Party	Democratic	Republican
Alliance	Working Families
Popular vote	218,119	140,356
Percentage	59.4%	38.2%
- Municipality results Courtney: 40–50% 50–60% 60–70% 70–80% Anderson: 40–50% 50–60%
U.S. Representative before election
Joe Courtney
Democratic
Elected U.S. Representative
Joe Courtney
Democratic

The 2nd congressional district takes in eastern Connecticut, including Enfield, Norwich, New London, and Groton. The incumbent was Democrat Joe Courtney, who was re-elected with 62.2% of the vote in 2018.

=== Democratic primary ===
==== Candidates ====
===== Declared =====
- Joe Courtney, incumbent U.S. representative

=== Republican primary ===
==== Declared ====
- Justin Anderson, former lieutenant colonel of the Connecticut Army National Guard
- Tom Gilmer, commercial roofer, building project manager (withdrawn) (Note: Tom Gilmer (R–Madison) withdrew from the race on the day of the primary following his arrest. His name could not be dropped from the ballot as the deadline to do so had already passed, but the state party has said it would have appointed someone else to the seat should Gilmer have won the election.)

==== Primary results ====
Republican primary results
Party	Candidate	Votes	%
Republican	Justin Anderson	9,238	50.05
Republican	Tom Gilmer (withdrawn)	9,221	49.95
Total votes		18,459	100.0

=== General election ===
==== Predictions ====
Source	Ranking	As of
The Cook Political Report	Safe D	July 2, 2020
Inside Elections	Safe D	June 2, 2020
Sabato's Crystal Ball	Safe D	September 3, 2020
Politico	Safe D	October 11, 2020
Daily Kos	Safe D	June 3, 2020
RCP	Safe D	June 9, 2020
Niskanen	Safe D	June 7, 2020

==== Results ====
2020 Connecticut's 2nd congressional district election
Party	Candidate	Votes	%
Democratic	Joe Courtney	207,303	56.4
Working Families	Joe Courtney	10,816	3.0
Total	Joe Courtney (incumbent)	218,119	59.4
Republican	Justin Anderson	140,356	38.2
Green	Cassandra Martineau	4,960	1.4
Libertarian	Dan Reale	3,903	1.0
Write-in		9	0.0
Total votes		367,347	100.0
Democratic hold			

== District 3 ==
2020 Connecticut's 3rd congressional district election
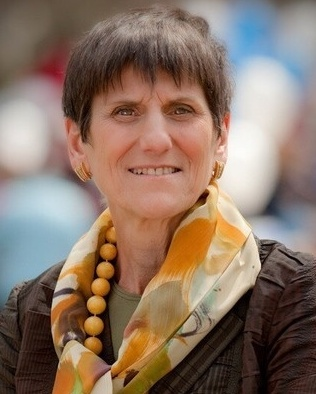

Nominee	Rosa DeLauro	Margaret Streicker
Party	Democratic	Republican
Alliance	Working Families	Independent Party
Popular vote	203,265	137,596
Percentage	58.7%	39.8%
- DeLauro: 40–50% 50–60% 60–70% 70–80% 80–90% >90% Streicker: 40–50% 50–60% 60–70%
U.S. Representative before election
Rosa DeLauro
Democratic
Elected U.S. Representative
Rosa DeLauro
Democratic

The 3rd district is located in the south central part of the state and takes in New Haven and its surrounding suburbs. The incumbent was Democrat Rosa DeLauro, who was re-elected with 64.6% of the vote in 2018.

=== Democratic primary ===
==== Candidates ====
===== Declared =====
- Rosa DeLauro, incumbent U.S. representative

=== Republican primary ===
==== Candidates ====
===== Declared =====
- Margaret Streicker, real estate executive

=== General election ===
==== Predictions ====
Source	Ranking	As of
The Cook Political Report	Safe D	July 2, 2020
Inside Elections	Safe D	June 2, 2020
Sabato's Crystal Ball	Safe D	July 2, 2020
Politico	Safe D	April 19, 2020
Daily Kos	Safe D	June 3, 2020
RCP	Safe D	June 9, 2020
Niskanen	Safe D	June 7, 2020

==== Results ====
2020 Connecticut's 3rd congressional district election
Party	Candidate	Votes	%
Democratic	Rosa DeLauro	194,259	56.1
Working Families	Rosa DeLauro	9,006	2.6
Total	Rosa DeLauro (incumbent)	203,265	58.7
Republican	Margaret Streicker	131,568	38.0
Independent Party	Margaret Streicker	6,030	1.8
Total	Margaret Streicker	137,596	39.8
Green	Justin Paglino	5,240	1.5
Total votes		346,101	100.0
Democratic hold			

== District 4 ==
2020 Connecticut's 4th congressional district election
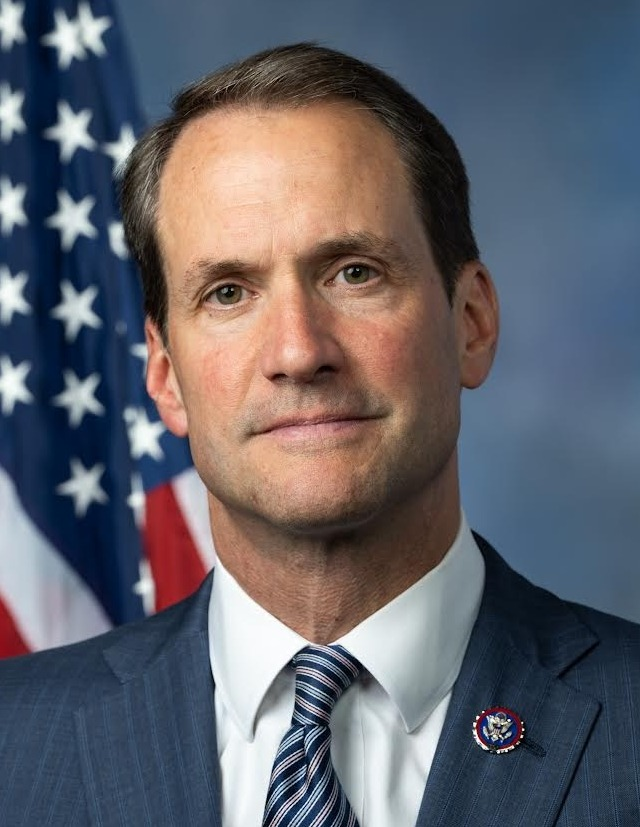

Nominee	Jim Himes	Jonathan Riddle
Party	Democratic	Republican
Popular vote	223,832	130,627
Percentage	62.2%	36.3%
- Himes: 40–50% 50–60% 60–70% 70–80% 80–90% Riddle: 40–50% 50–60% 60–70%
U.S. Representative before election
Jim Himes
Democratic
Elected U.S. Representative
Jim Himes
Democratic

The 4th district is located in southwestern Connecticut, stretching from Greenwich to Bridgeport. The incumbent was Democrat Jim Himes, who was re-elected with 61.2% of the vote in 2018.

=== Democratic primary ===
==== Candidates ====
===== Declared =====
- Jim Himes, incumbent U.S. representative

=== Republican primary ===
==== Candidates ====
===== Declared =====
- Jonathan Riddle, financial executive

=== General election ===
==== Debate ====
2020 Connecticut's 4th congressional district debate
No.	Date	Host	Moderator	Link	Democratic	Republican
Key: P Participant A Absent N Not invited I Invited W Withdrawn						
Key: P Participant A Absent N Not invited I Invited W Withdrawn					Jim Himes	Jonathan Riddle
1	Oct. 18, 2020	League of Women Voters of Connecticut; League of Women Voters of New Canaan; League of Women Voters of Norwalk; League of Women Voters of Stamford; Westport Library	Kay Maxwell		P	P

==== Predictions ====
Source	Ranking	As of
The Cook Political Report	Safe D	July 2, 2020
Inside Elections	Safe D	June 2, 2020
Sabato's Crystal Ball	Safe D	July 2, 2020
Politico	Safe D	April 19, 2020
Daily Kos	Safe D	June 3, 2020
RCP	Safe D	June 9, 2020
Niskanen	Safe D	June 7, 2020

==== Results ====
2020 Connecticut's 4th congressional district election
Party	Candidate	Votes	%
Democratic	Jim Himes (incumbent)	223,832	62.2
Republican	Jonathan Riddle	130,627	36.3
Independent	Brian Merlen	5,656	1.6
Write-in		10	0.0
Total votes		360,125	100.0
Democratic hold			

== District 5 ==
2020 Connecticut's 5th congressional district election
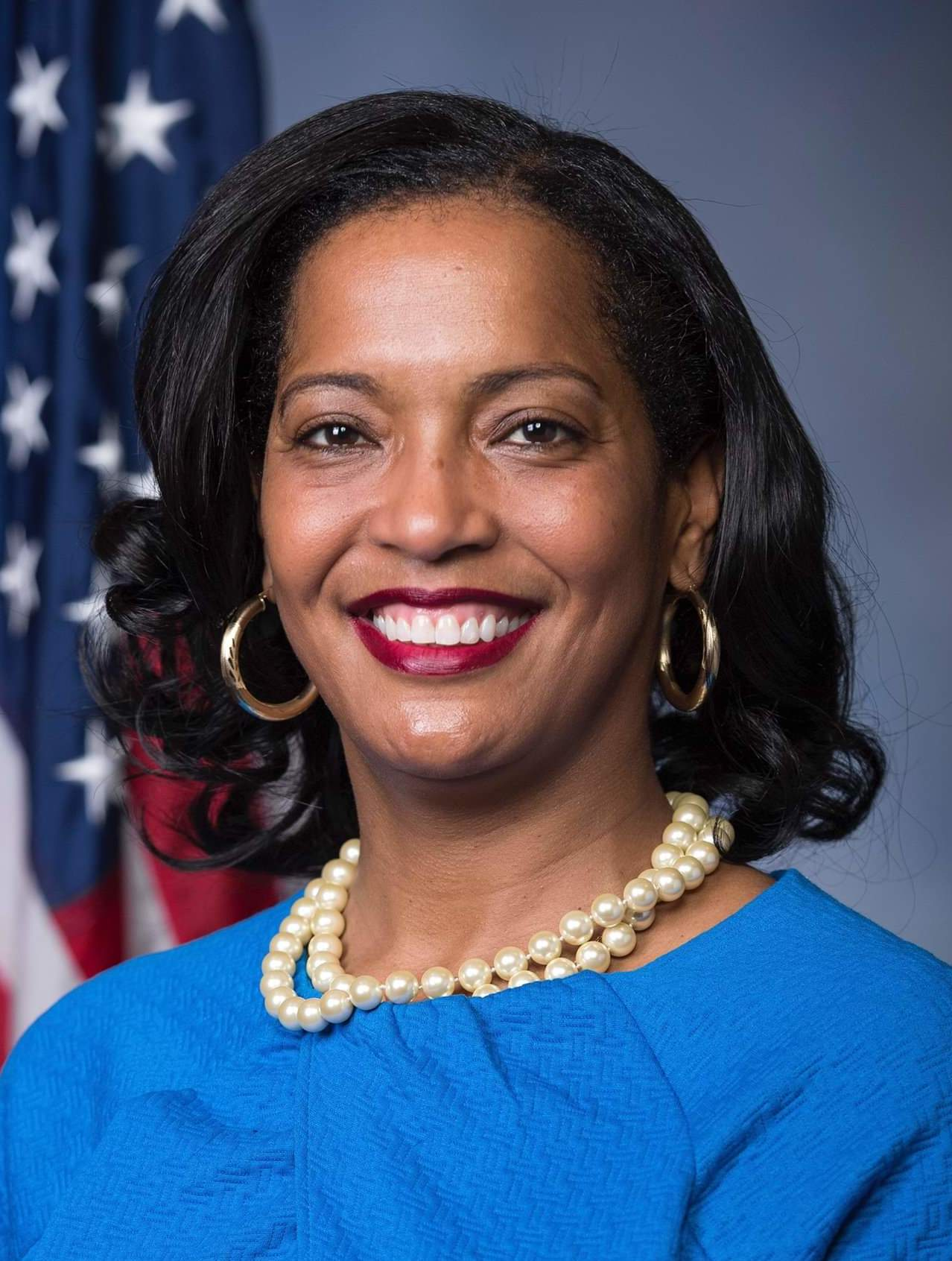

Nominee	Jahana Hayes	David X. Sullivan
Party	Democratic	Republican
Alliance	Working Families
Popular vote	192,484	151,988
Percentage	55.1%	43.5%
- Hayes: 40–50% 50–60% 60–70% 70–80% 80–90% Sullivan: 40–50% 50–60% 60–70%
U.S. Representative before election
Jahana Hayes
Democratic
Elected U.S. Representative
Jahana Hayes
Democratic

The 5th district is based in the northwestern region of the state, including the cities of Danbury, New Britain, Meriden, and most of Waterbury. The incumbent was Democrat Jahana Hayes, who was elected with 55.9% of the vote in 2018.

=== Democratic primary ===
==== Candidates ====
===== Declared =====
- Jahana Hayes, incumbent U.S. representative

==== Endorsements ====
Jahana Hayes

Former US executive branch officials

- Barack Obama, former president of the United States (2009–2017)

Organizations

- EMILY's List
- League of Conservation Voters
- Sierra Club

=== Republican primary ===
==== Candidates ====
===== Declared =====
- David X. Sullivan, former assistant U.S. attorney for the District of Connecticut

===== Withdrawn =====
- Pete Barresi, aircraft maintenance manager
- Robert F. Hyde, U.S. Marine Corps veteran
- Ryan Meehan, businessman and military veteran
- Ruben Rodriguez, former Waterbury city plan commissioner and candidate for the Connecticut House of Representatives in 2014

=== General election ===
==== Predictions ====
Source	Ranking	As of
The Cook Political Report	Safe D	July 2, 2020
Inside Elections	Safe D	June 2, 2020
Sabato's Crystal Ball	Safe D	July 2, 2020
Politico	Likely D	October 11, 2020
Daily Kos	Safe D	June 3, 2020
RCP	Safe D	October 24, 2020
Niskanen	Safe D	June 7, 2020

==== Results ====
2020 Connecticut's 5th congressional district election
Party	Candidate	Votes	%
Democratic	Jahana Hayes	183,797	52.6
Working Families	Jahana Hayes	8,687	2.5
Total	Jahana Hayes (incumbent)	192,484	55.1
Republican	David X. Sullivan	151,988	43.5
Independent	Bruce Walczak	5,052	1.4
Total votes		349,524	100.0
Democratic hold			
