= Jorge Cabrera (politician) =

American politician

Member of the Connecticut State Senate from the 17th district
- Incumbent
- Assumed office January 6, 2021
- Preceded by: George Logan

Personal details
- Born: April 16, 1974 (age 52)
- Party: Democratic
- Children: 2
- Education: Quinnipiac University (BA)

Jorge Cabrera is an American politician serving as a member of the Connecticut State Senate from the 17th district. Elected in November 2020, he assumed office on January 6, 2021.

== Early life and education ==
Cabrera was raised in Connecticut. He earned a Bachelor of Arts degree in political science from Quinnipiac University.

== Career ==
After serving as a legislative aide for Representative Moira K. Lyons, Cabrera worked for the United Brotherhood of Carpenters and Joiners of America. He later joined the United Food and Commercial Workers as an International Representative, American Federation of Teachers Connecticut and currently works in Business Development for IUPAT DC 11 in Middletown. In 2018, Cabrera ran for the Connecticut State Senate against Republican Senator George Logan and lost by 77 votes. Cabrera ran again in 2020 and won. He assumed office on January 6, 2021. He was re-elected in 2022 and 2024

== Personal life ==
Cabrera is of Puerto Rican descent.
