= Connecticut's congressional districts =

U.S. House districts in the state of Connecticut

Map of Connecticut's congressional districts from 2023 Interactive map version

Connecticut is divided among five congressional districts from which citizens elect the state's representatives to the United States House of Representatives. After the re-apportionment following the 2000 census, Connecticut lost one representative, reducing the state's delegation from six to five. The redistricting process was shared between the Republican governor at the time, John G. Rowland, and the Democratic-controlled General Assembly. Before the census, the state's House delegation was split evenly between Republicans and Democrats, and the solution finally agreed upon by the redistricting committee would ensure an even match-up between incumbents, the 6th district's Nancy L. Johnson, a Republican, and the 5th district's James H. Maloney, a Democrat. In the 2002 elections, Johnson defeated Maloney by a surprisingly large margin in the new 5th district.

Since the 2008 elections, all five of Connecticut's representatives are Democrats. Christopher Shays, previously the only Republican in the state's congressional delegation, lost his re-election bid in 2008.

== Current districts and representatives ==
This is a list of United States representatives from Connecticut, their terms, their district boundaries, and the district political ratings, according to the CPVI. The delegation has a total of 5 members, all of whom are members of the Democratic party.

Current U.S. representatives from Connecticut
District	Member (Residence)	Party	Incumbent since	CPVI (2025)	District map
1st	John B. Larson (East Hartford)	Democratic	January 3, 1999	D+12	Map of Connecticut's 1st congressional district
2nd	Joe Courtney (Vernon)	Democratic	January 3, 2007	D+4	Map of Connecticut's 2nd congressional district
3rd	Rosa DeLauro (New Haven)	Democratic	January 3, 1991	D+8	Map of Connecticut's 3rd congressional district
4th	Jim Himes (Cos Cob)	Democratic	January 3, 2009	D+13	Map of Connecticut's 4th congressional district
5th	Jahana Hayes (Wolcott)	Democratic	January 3, 2019	D+3	Map of Connecticut's 5th congressional district

== Historical results ==
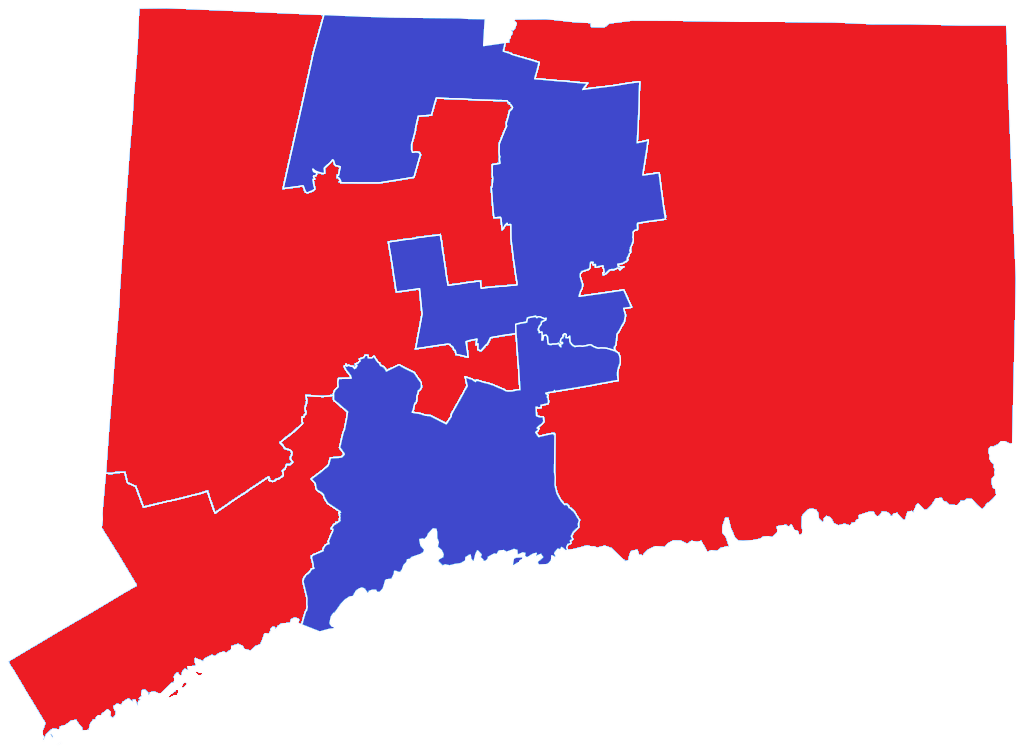
2002

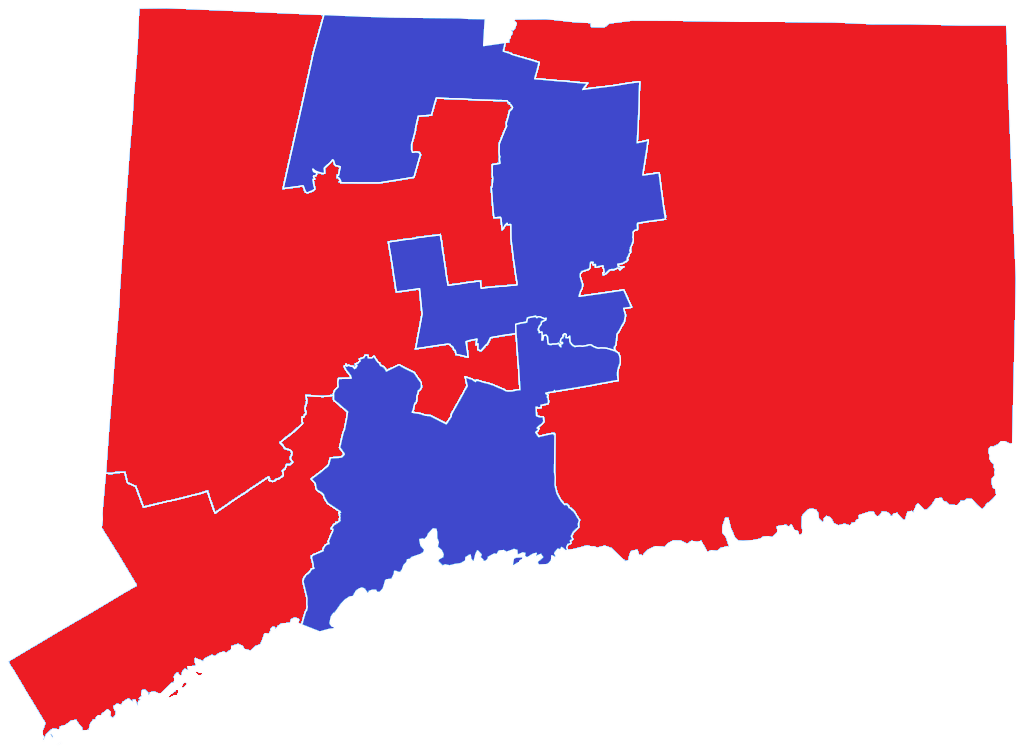
2004

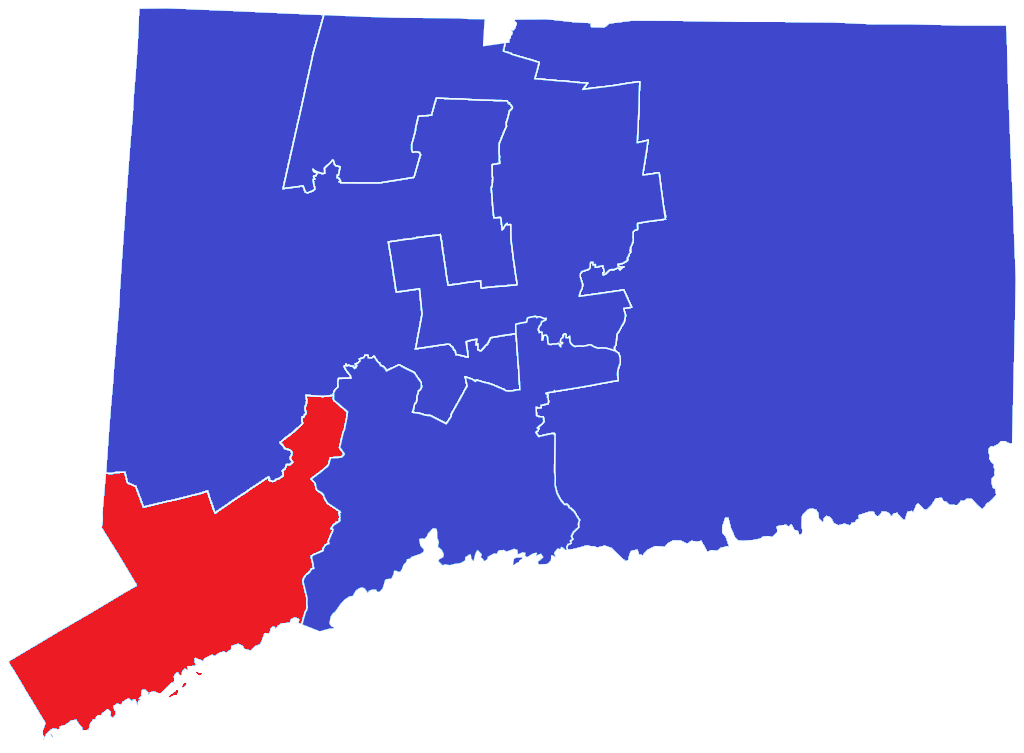
2006

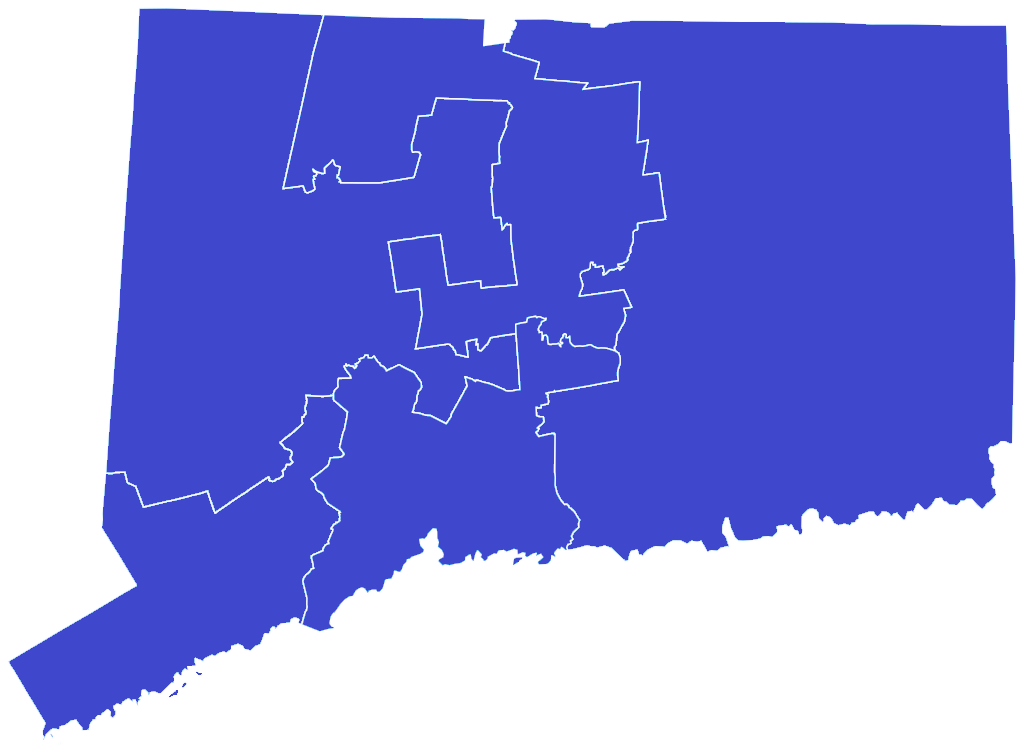
2008

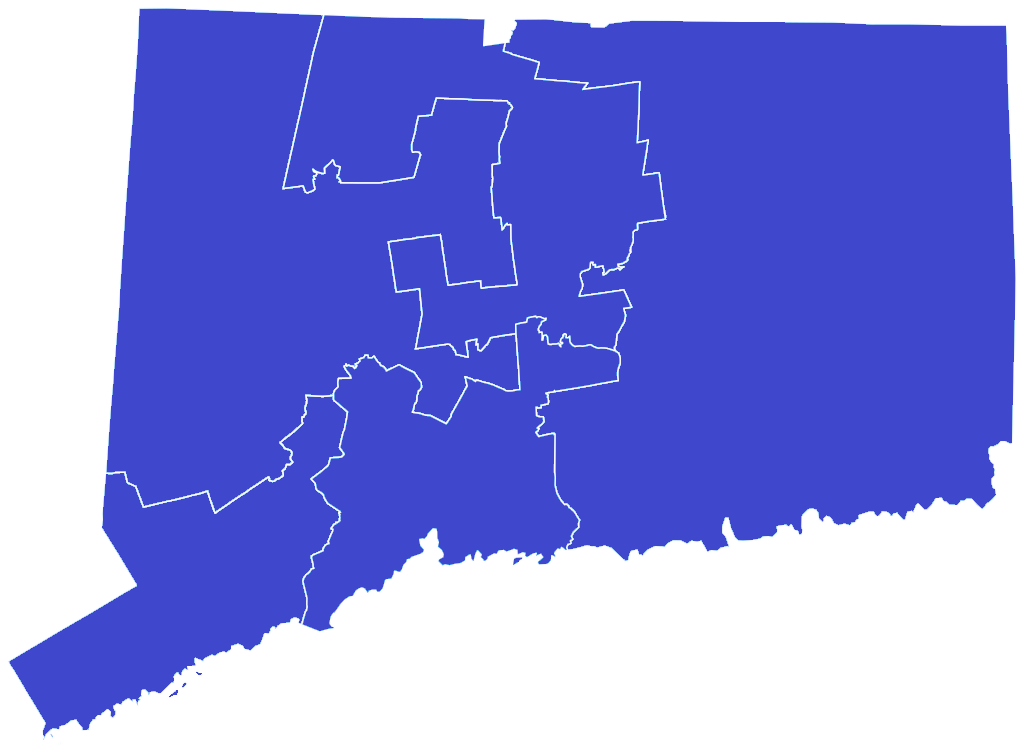
2010

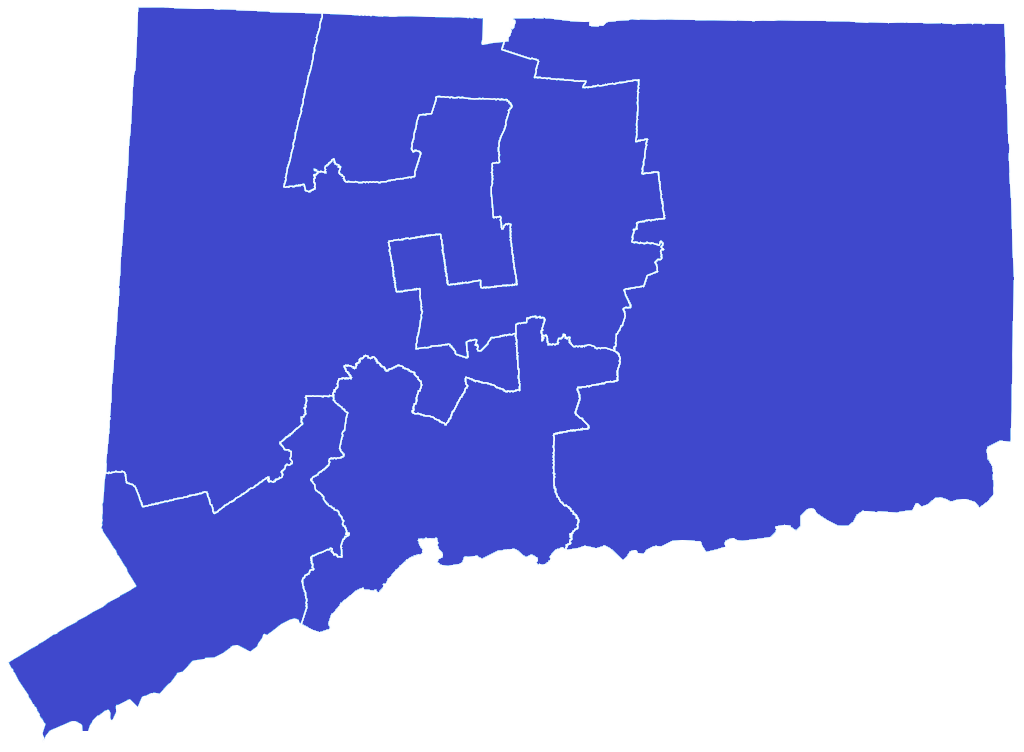
2012

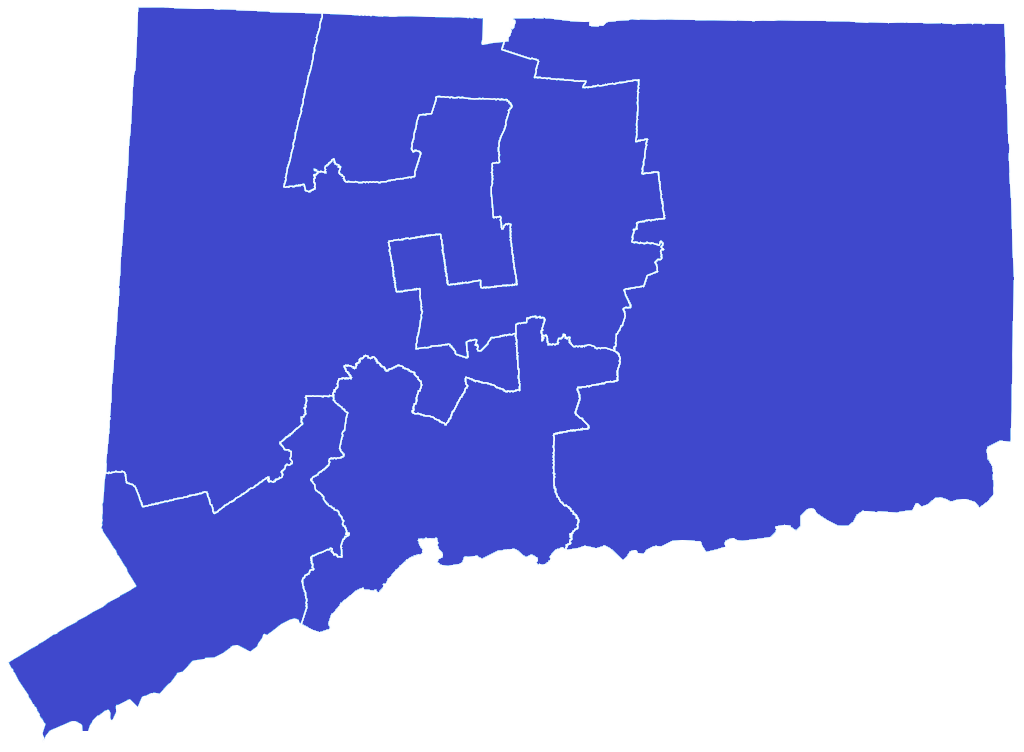
2014

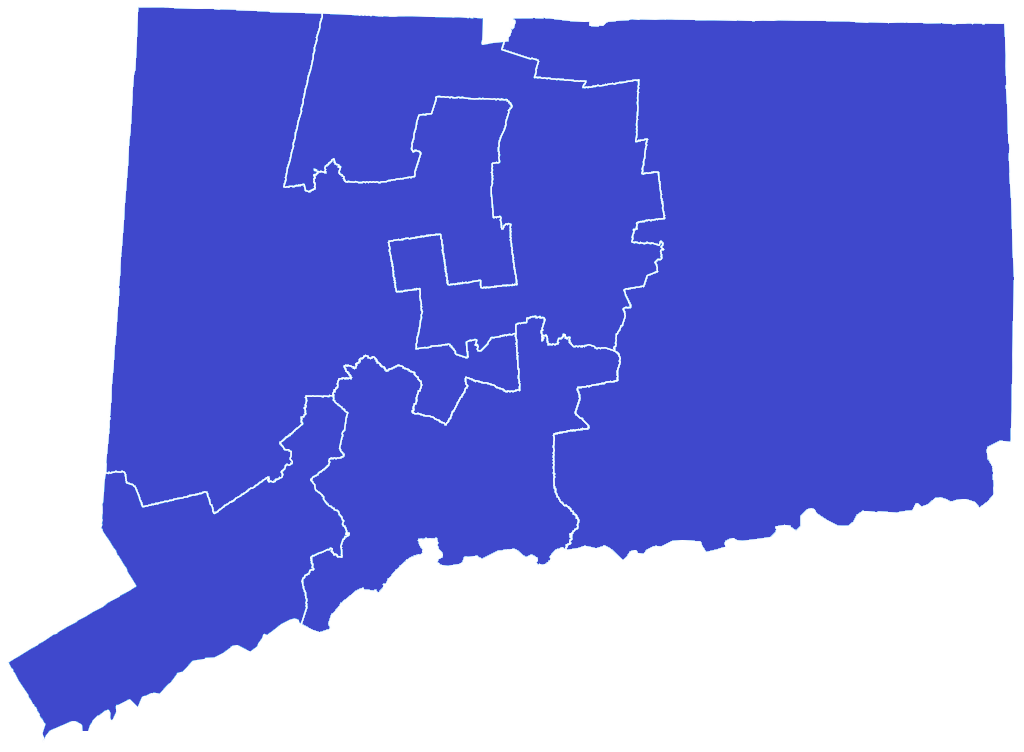
2016

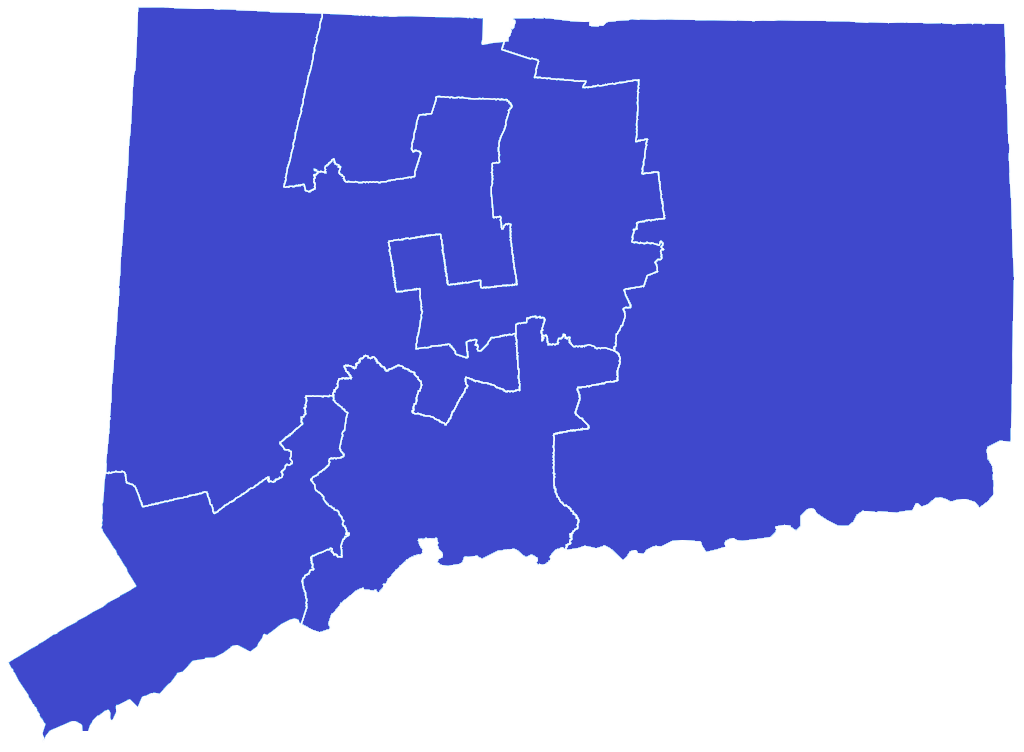
2018

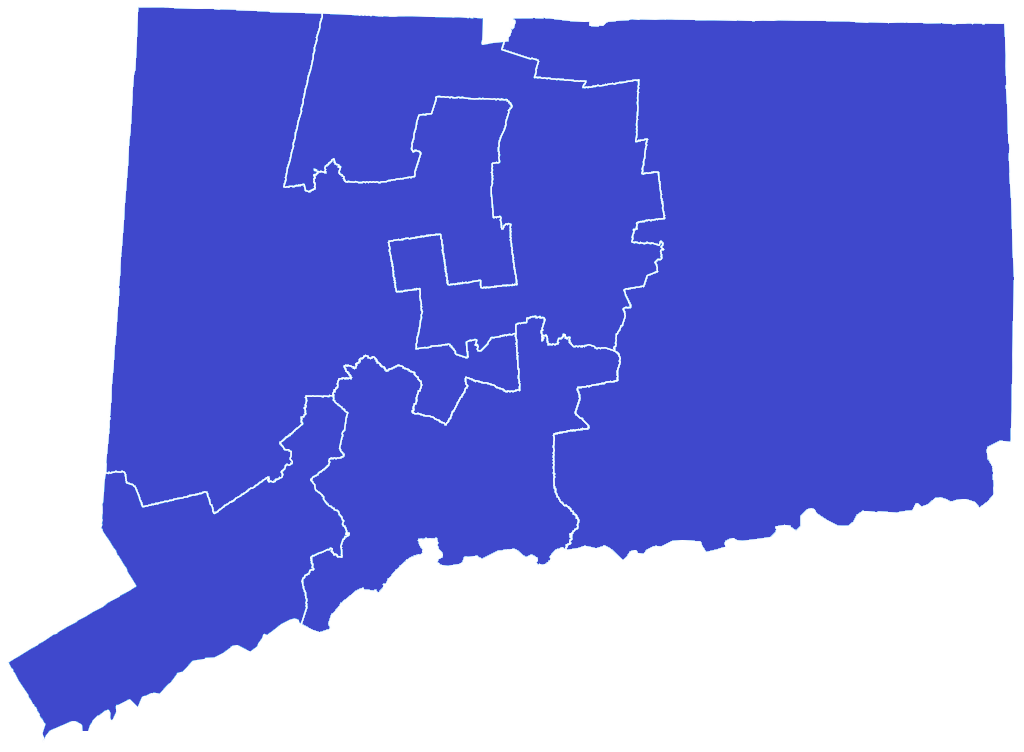
2020

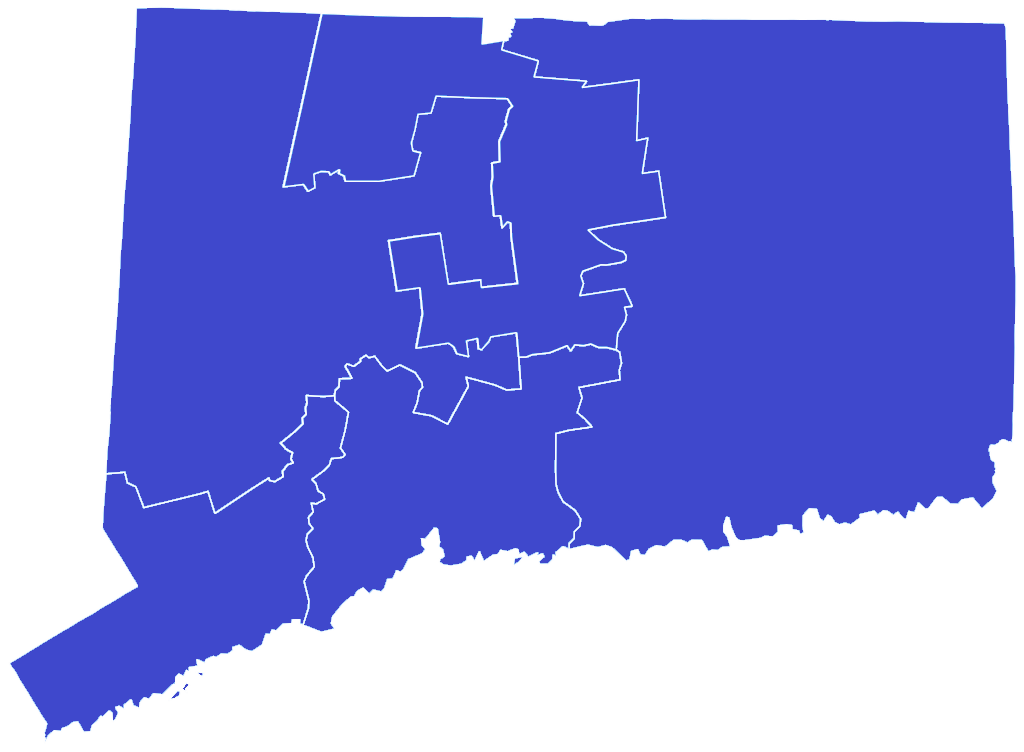
2022

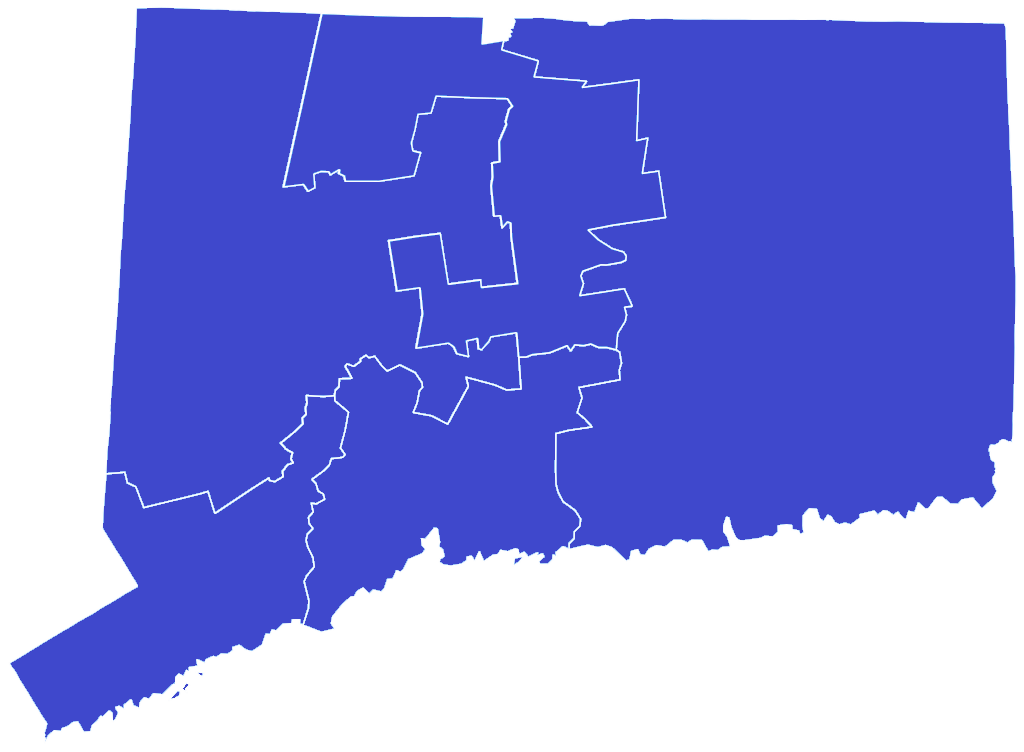
2024

== District profiles ==
=== First district ===
The 1st district still comprises the greater part of the Hartford metropolitan area. Hartford, the capital of Connecticut, is still the population center and focal point of the district, which also includes wealthy West Hartford, the center of Greater Hartford's Jewish and Asian-American communities, and working-class East Hartford, home of Pratt and Whitney. After the re-apportionment, however, the district was shifted westward, and now includes sections of northern Litchfield County, once represented by the old 6th district, as well as stretching southward, to take in a portion of Middletown, and southwest, to include Bristol and Southington. Long severed from the wealthier and more moderate Hartford suburbs in the Farmington Valley, the 1st district is reliably and strongly Democratic. Hartford casts large pluralities for the Democratic candidate in all races, and the former mill towns which surround the capital, such as East Hartford and Middletown, have largely retained their ethnic Democratic heritage.

Congressman John B. Larson, the former President pro tempore of the Connecticut Senate from East Hartford, has represented the 1st district since 1999. He succeeded Barbara B. Kennelly, who had unsuccessfully challenged Governor John G. Rowland during that election cycle. Larson was elected House Democratic Caucus Vice Chairman in 2006, and became Caucus Chairman at the start of the 111th United States Congress; he served in the latter role for four years, before leaving that role due to term limits. Larson's victory resurrected a political career temporarily suspended by a crushing defeat in the 1994 Democratic primary for Governor, in which he lost to comptroller Bill Curry, despite receiving the endorsement of the state party convention. Larson won the election in 1998 with 58% of the vote, and has been re-elected ever since, receiving no less than 60% during each election cycle.

=== Second district ===
The 2nd district takes in nearly half of the state, geographically, and has long been the voice in Washington for largely rural Eastern Connecticut. The redistricting process maintained the approximate historical area of the district, despite state Democrats' hope to draw the Republican representative at the time, Rob Simmons, out of a seat by partitioning the area between the heavily Democratic districts centered on Hartford and New Haven. Since the 108th Congress, the 2nd district seeps into the eastern parts of Hartford county, reaching into the suburbs north of Hartford such as Suffield, as well as some towns to the capital's east, like Glastonbury which it shares with the 1st. The redistricting committee intended to more or less retain the partisan balance of the district, which heavily favored Democrats to begin with, and swapped Middletown for Enfield, similarly sized towns with similarly Democratic heritages. The demographics of the 2nd district vary widely, ranging from the liberal and culturally diverse population centers of New London, Norwich, and Windham, to the blue-collar towns of Enfield and Vernon, to the wealthy (and traditionally Republican) towns along the coast like Old Saybrook and Mystic where many millionaires from both Connecticut and New York maintain vacation homes. Statistically, Democrats dominate the 2nd district, although Republicans have recently fared well here in both congressional and statewide elections. New London, Norwich, and the students from the University of Connecticut in Storrs consistently vote for Democrats in overwhelming margins. Former Republican strongholds along the coast and in the wealthier Hartford suburbs have been trending Democratic recently as the GOP has become increasingly conservative and regional, although most voters here have little difficulty differentiating between the national party and local moderate Republicans.

In 2006, former Democratic state representative Joe Courtney of Vernon defeated popular incumbent Republican Rob Simmons by a razor-thin margin of 83 votes. A disastrous year for Republicans nationwide, rather than any substantive dissatisfaction with Simmons, was the likely factor behind Courtney's victory. Simmons had defeated ten-term incumbent Sam Gejdenson in 2000, and had won reelection by eight-point margins in 2002 and 2004, the former against Courtney.

=== Third district ===
The 3rd district envelops the greater part of New Haven County, surrounding the city of New Haven, the district's population center, regional hub of southern Connecticut, and home to Yale University. The district is the most diverse region of Connecticut, with many Irish, Italian, Polish, Jewish, Greek, Asian, and African-American communities. More recently, New Haven as a growing population of Ecuadorians. Since reapportionment, the 3rd district now also includes the entirety of the Naugatuck Valley, a crucial component of the former 5th district. While the district does take in some of Connecticut's wealthy coastal towns such as Guilford, most of the coastal towns in the 3rd are eminently middle-class, like Milford and Stratford. The district also notably encompasses the core area of Connecticut's large Italian-American community, from the area around Wooster Street in New Haven, to the neighborhood of Town Plot in Waterbury, Connecticut, to the many suburbs like Hamden, Milford, West Haven, East Haven, and North Haven. The area is also home to large numbers of Irish-American communities. The state's largest Portuguese-American community, in Naugatuck, is also located in the 3rd district, as well as one of the oldest African-American communities in the Newhallville area of New Haven. The New Haven area retains an overwhelmingly Democratic heritage for the most part, although Republicans have made significant successful inroads in the communities of the suburbs. Waterbury, Connecticut's 5th largest city, is a Democratic but very conservative city, where many of the Italian, Irish, and Lebanese voters have become increasingly comfortable voting for Republicans. After long remaining the focal point of the old 5th district, Waterbury was placed largely in the new 5th; yet, the considerably Republican and Italian neighborhood of Town Plot excised and lopped onto the 3rd, to the dismay of 5th district Republicans.

The representative from the 3rd district is Rosa DeLauro, the scion of an influential political family from New Haven. Before being elected in 1990, DeLauro worked as a political activist for liberal causes and an influential fundraiser for state and national Democrats, serving as chief of staff to Senator Chris Dodd and Executive Director of EMILY's List, a pro-choice PAC. Both of her parents were New Haven Alderman, and her husband, Stan Greenberg, is a highly reputed consultant and pollster. DeLauro has faced little opposition since 1990, when she barely defeated young state legislator Tom Scott of Milford, an anti-tax Republican who made DeLauro's strong support of a woman's right to choose a central issue in the campaign. While Republicans almost captured the 1990 open seat being vacated by Bruce Morrison in his unsuccessful campaign for Governor, and had actually held it for one term in the 1980s, the 3rd district has become more Democratic since the Bill Clinton years.

=== Fourth district ===
The 4th district is the political region of Connecticut "Gold Coast"—the string of prosperous towns and cities along the shore of Fairfield County, home of many very wealthy Manhattan business elite and celebrities. While rich communities like Greenwich, New Canaan, Stamford, Darien, Ridgefield, Fairfield, Wilton and Westport may typify the luxurious stereotypes of this area of Connecticut, the district is also home to one of the poorest cities in the United States, Bridgeport, the largest city in Connecticut. Before the redistricting, the 4th included exclusively the few towns on the Long Island Sound from New York to Bridgeport; it now extends northward and eastward to take in the suburbs of Danbury as well as many towns that once constituted the heart of the old 5th district. In so doing, the reapportioned district after 2002 followed many Republican natives of lower Fairfield County who had relocated further into Connecticut for economic reasons.

The representative of the 4th district is Jim Himes who worked for 12 years at Goldman Sachs Group Inc. before leaving to head Enterprise Community Partners, a group that worked to combat urban poverty. Himes defeated longtime Republican incumbent Chris Shays in the November 2008 election.

The district has a long history of moderate and independent Congressmen, with Shays succeeding Representatives such as Stewart McKinney (who had died from AIDS, in 1987) and Lowell P. Weicker (who became estranged from the Republican Party following his service on the Senate Watergate Committee). Shays, widely regarded as a social moderate, fended off strong challenges from Westport Selectman Diane Farrell in 2004 and 2006, before local demographic shifts and a national mood favoring Democratic candidates resulted in his narrow defeat. Potential Republican candidates include Lieutenant Governor Michael Fedele from Stamford, State Senator (and son of the former Congressman) John P. McKinney of Southport, and state House Minority Leader Lawrence Cafero of Norwalk.

=== Fifth district ===
The 5th district is an approximate combination of the former 5th and 6th districts before the 2000 census. The district was designed as the result of a compromise among the redistricting committee as an evenly divided territory into which a Republican and a Democratic incumbent were both drawn. The new 5th largely maintained the distinguishing feature of the old 5th – the I-84 corridor connecting Danbury to Waterbury, and then stretching southeastward to Meriden. And similar to the old 6th district, the 5th takes in most of Litchfield County and the towns of the Farmington Valley in Hartford County. In the presidential politics the district is the most amenable in the state to backing Republicans, as it voted slightly for John Kerry in 2004 and Al Gore in 2000, but on the whole provides both parties with no overwhelming advantage. The suburbs of Waterbury, the small towns in Litchfield County, and the Farmington Valley are all traditionally Republican and generally conservative outposts. Meriden and the city of New Britain, located at the eastern fringe of the district, are both strongly Democratic towns that reliably give large pluralities to the Democratic candidate.

Previously, it was held by Elizabeth Esty of Cheshire from 2013-2019. She declined to run for a 4th term in 2018 due to a scandal in which she was accused of failing to protect her female staff members from her former chief-of-staff, who was alleged to have physically assaulted and harassed another staff member. Before that, it was held by current senator Chris Murphy, a former state Senator and representative originally from Southington. Prior to the 2006 election, Murphy moved across the border to the 5th district town of Cheshire, and scored a 56–44% upset victory against 24-year Republican incumbent Nancy L. Johnson of New Britain. The representative for the 5th district is Jahana Hayes, who was narrowly re-elected in 2022, in one of the closest house elections in the state since 2006.

== Historical and present district boundaries ==
Table of United States congressional district boundary maps in the State of Connecticut, presented chronologically. All redistricting events that took place in Connecticut between 1973 and 2013 are shown.

Year	Statewide map
1973–1983	
1983–1993	
1993–2003	
2003–2013	
2013-2023	

== See also ==
- List of United States congressional districts
