= Connecticut's 17th State Senate district =

American legislative district

Senator
Jorge Cabrera; D

Connecticut's 17th State Senate district elects one member of the Connecticut State Senate. It consists of the communities of Ansonia, Derby, Beacon Falls, Bethany, and parts of Hamden, Naugatuck, and Woodbridge. It has been represented by Jorge Cabrera since 2021.

== Recent elections ==
=== 2020 ===
2020 Connecticut State Senate election, District 17
Party	Candidate	Votes	%
Democratic	Jorge Cabrera	23,810	49.61
Republican	George Logan (incumbent)	21,441	44.68
Independent Party	George Logan (incumbent)	1,517	3.16
Working Families	Jorge Cabrera	1,224	2.55
Total votes		47,992	100.00
Democratic gain from Republican			

=== 2018 ===
2018 Connecticut State Senate election, District 17
Party	Candidate	Votes	%
Total	George Logan (incumbent)	18,531	50.1
Republican	George Logan	17,544	47.4
Independent	George Logan	987	2.7
Total	Jorge Cabrera	18,446	49.9
Democratic	Jorge Cabrera	17,623	47.7
Working Families	Jorge Cabrera	823	2.2
Total votes		36,977	100.0
Republican hold			

=== 2016 ===
2016 Connecticut State Senate election, District 17
Party	Candidate	Votes	%
Republican	George Logan	21,602	50.92
Democratic	Joseph Crisco (incumbent)	20,769	49.08
Total votes		47,992	100.00
Republican gain from Democratic			

=== 2014 ===
2014 Connecticut State Senate election, District 17
Party	Candidate	Votes	%
Republican	Philip Tripp	11,958	42.4
Independent	Philip Tripp	902	3.2
Democratic	Joe Crisco (Incumbent)	14,382	51.00
Working Families	Joe Crisco	985	3.5
Total votes		28,227	100.0
Democratic hold			

=== 2012 ===
2012 Connecticut State Senate election, District 17
Party	Candidate	Votes	%
Democratic	Joseph Crisco (incumbent)	26,994	71.2
Republican	Tony Szeqczyk	10,944	28.8
Total votes		47,992	100.00
Democratic hold			
