= Under Secretary of Agriculture for Marketing and Regulatory Programs =

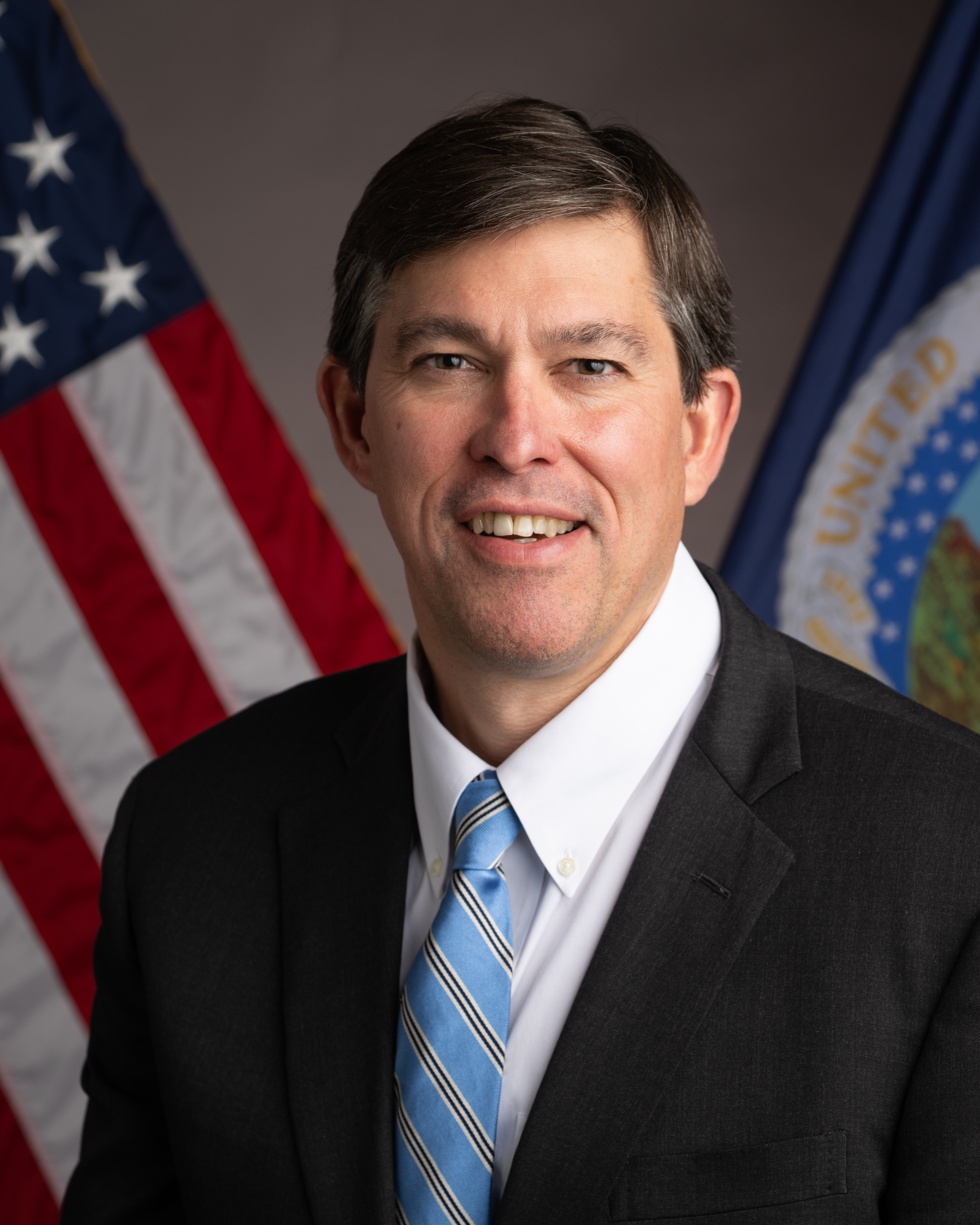
- Incumbent; Dudley Hoskins since September 23, 2025
- USDA
- Abbreviation: MRP
- Member of: Cabinet
- Reports to: US Secretary of Agriculture
- Appointer: The president with Senate advice and consent
- Precursor: Assistant Secretary of Agriculture for Marketing and Regulatory Programs
- Formation: 1998
- First holder: Michael V. Dunn

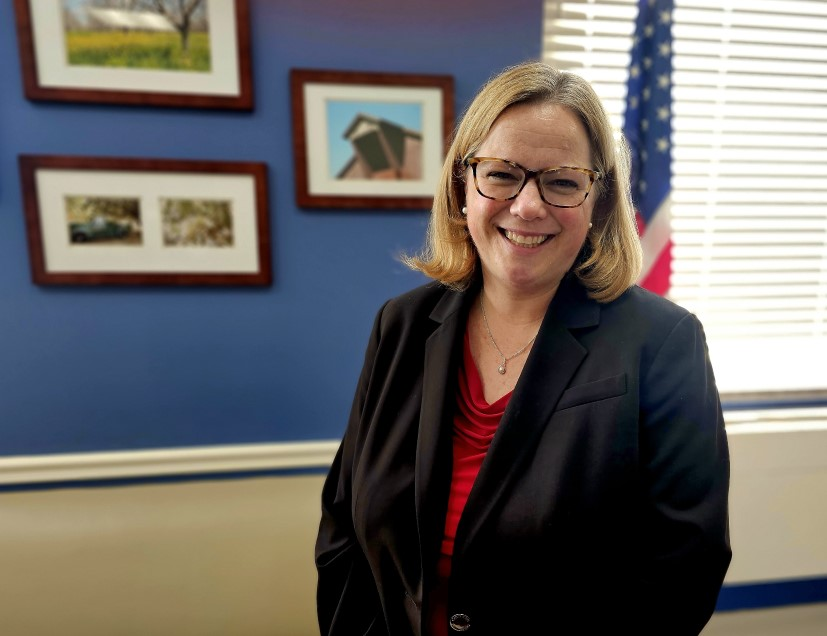
Former Under Secretary Jennifer Moffitt

The under secretary for marketing and regulatory programs is a high-ranking position within the United States Department of Agriculture that supervises policy development and day-to-day operations of the Animal and Plant Health Inspection Service, the Agricultural Marketing Service, and the Grain Inspection, Packers, and Stockyards Administration. The three agencies were appropriated over $800 million by Congress in fiscal year 2004.

The Agricultural Marketing Service administers programs that attempt to facilitate the fair marketing of U.S. agricultural products. The Animal and Plant Health Inspection Service attempts to safeguard America's resources from exotic invasive pests and diseases and monitor and manage agricultural pests and diseases existing in the United States. It also resolves and manages trade issues related to animal or plant health, and ensures the humane care and treatment of animals. The Grain Inspection, Packers and Stockyards Administration attempts to facilitate the marketing of livestock, poultry, meat, cereals, oilseeds, and related agricultural products, and promote fair and competitive trading practices.

In April 2021, Jenny Lester Moffitt was nominated as under secretary. The previous under secretary, Greg Ibach, was confirmed by the U.S. Senate on October 26, 2017. Previous incumbent Bruce I. Knight was confirmed by the U.S. Senate on August 6, 2006. Former under secretaries include Bill Hawks, who served from April 2001 until June 2005, Islam "Isa" A. Siddiqui, whose recess appointment was announced by President Bill Clinton on December 29, 2000, and Michael V. Dunn, who served from November 1998 until April 2000.

The position was created by the Department of Transportation and Related Agencies Appropriations Act of 1999, which was signed on October 21, 1998, by President Clinton. Prior to this act, there had been an Assistant Secretary of Agriculture for Marketing and Regulatory Programs, which was abolished. The under secretary is appointed by the president with the confirmation of the Senate.
