= Jennifer Moffitt =

American farmer and government official (born 1980)

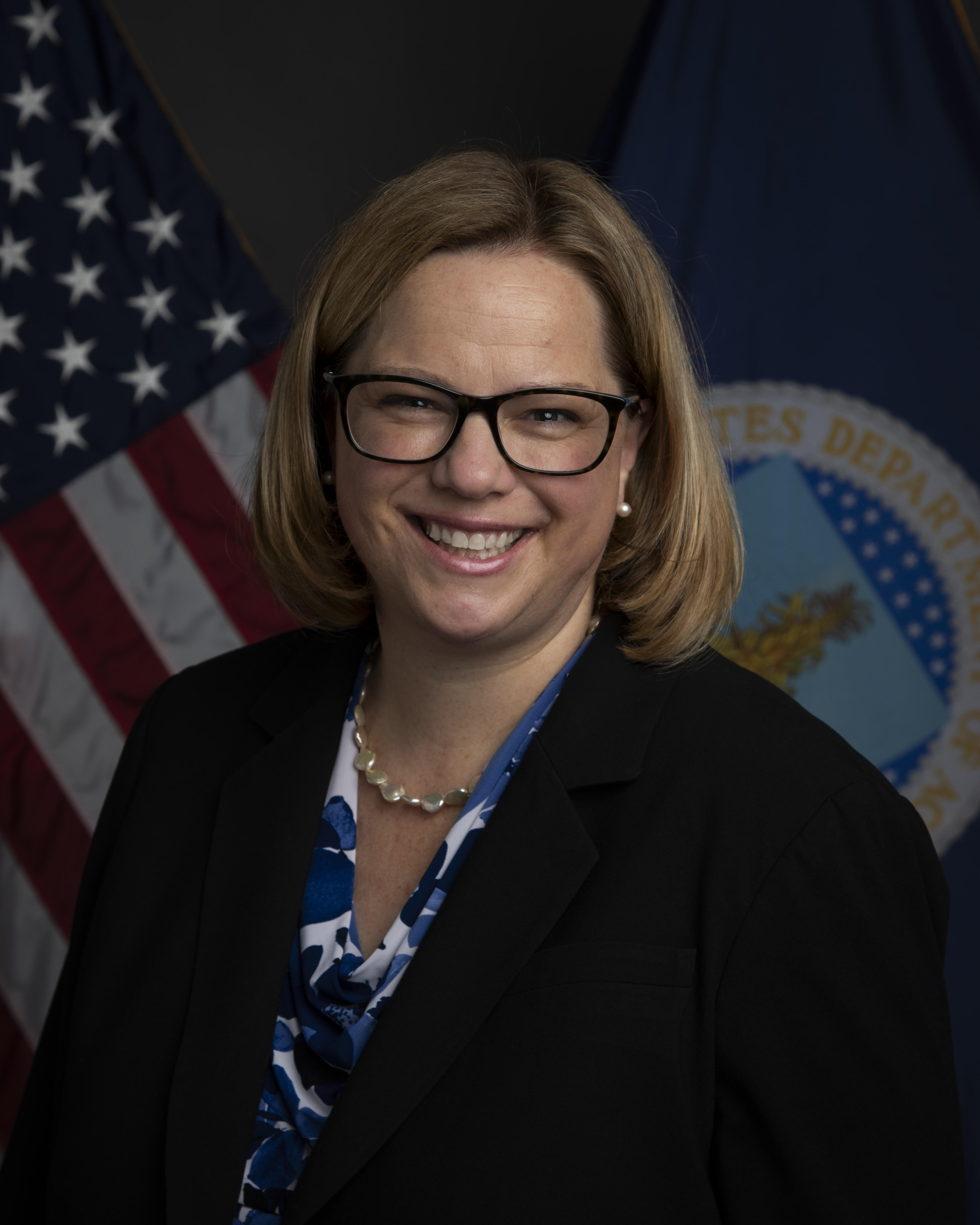

Under Secretary of Agriculture for Marketing and Regulatory Programs
- In office August 13, 2021 – January 20, 2025
- President: Joe Biden
- Leader: Tom Vilsack
- Preceded by: Greg Ibach
- Succeeded by: Dudley Hoskins

Undersecretary of the California Department of Food and Agriculture
- In office February 2018 – August 2021
- Governor: Jerry Brown; Gavin Newsom

Deputy Secretary of the California Department of Food and Agriculture
- In office January 2015 – February 2018
- Appointed by: Jerry Brown

Personal details
- Born: 1980 (age 45–46)
- Education: Brown University

Jennifer Lester Moffitt (born 1980) is an American organic farmer and government official from California who served as Under Secretary of Agriculture for Marketing and Regulatory Programs at the United States Department of Agriculture in the Biden administration; she was the first woman to hold this position. Moffitt previously served as the Undersecretary at the California Department of Food and Agriculture. She is currently Vice President of Farmland Protection and Strategic Priorities at American Farmland Trust.

== Early life and education ==
Moffitt grew up on her family's organic farm in Winters, California. She was active in 4-H and the National FFA Organization, raising market lambs and earning a State FFA degree. Moffitt graduated from Brown University and is also an alumna of the California Agricultural Leadership Foundation.

== Career ==
After college, Moffitt worked at American Farmland Trust. From 2005-2015, she worked for her family's organic walnut farm and processing operation, leading sales and marketing efforts and serving as the farm's Managing Director. During her tenure, the farm was recognized with the Governor's Environmental and Economic Leadership Award for their sustainable farming and management practices.

In 2011, Governor Jerry Brown appointed Moffitt to serve on the Central Valley Regional Water Quality Control Board. In 2015, Governor Brown appointed Moffitt to serve as Deputy Secretary for Policy at the California Department of Food and Agriculture; she was promoted to Undersecretary in 2018. In 2019, she was reappointed to serve as Undersecretary by Governor Gavin Newsom.

=== California Department of Food and Agriculture ===
As Deputy Secretary, Moffitt led a number of efforts to elevate climate-smart agriculture, including the CA Healthy Soils Initiative and California Natural and Working Lands Strategy. She also established the California Farm Demonstration Network and helped develop the state's first Short-Lived Climate Pollutant Reduction Plan and Transformative Climate Communities and Sustainable Agricultural Land Conservation program.

As Undersecretary, she led additional strategic initiatives and policy development to protect and promote California agriculture, including the launch of the Global Soil Health Challenge, the CA Water Resilience Portfolio, and the US Climate Alliance. During the pandemic, Moffitt served as a key member of the Governor's COVID-19 response team, developing guidelines for industry and providing resources to farmer and farmworker communities.

On April 27, 2021, President Joe Biden announced Moffitt to be his nominee to be the Under Secretary of Agriculture for Marketing and Regulatory Programs. Secretary of the California Department of Food and Agriculture Karen Ross endorsed the nomination. On April 28, 2021, Moffit's nomination was sent to the Senate. On July 26, 2021, her nomination was reported favorably out of committee. On August 11, 2021, Moffitt was confirmed by the Senate by voice vote.

=== U.S. Department of Agriculture ===
As Under Secretary, Moffitt provided leadership for the Agricultural Marketing Service (AMS) and the Animal and Plant Health Inspection Service (APHIS), working to build a more reliable, resilient, and equitable food system by strengthening agricultural markets and ensuring the health and welfare of animals and plants. During her tenure, she oversaw the implementation of USDA's Food Systems Transformation Initiative, Competition Initiative, and Organic Transition Initiative. In 2023, Moffitt led the U.S. delegation to the U.N. Food Systems Summit in Rome and represented USDA at the inaugural Africa Climate Summit and the African Food Systems Summit. In 2024, Moffitt led the U.S. delegation to the World Organisation for Animal Health General Assembly to celebrate the organization's 100th anniversary.

In recognition of her work at USDA, Moffitt received the 2024 Organic Champion Award from the Organic Trade Association and a 2024 IDFA Leadership Award from the International Dairy Foods Association. She was also inducted into the Winters Joint Unified School District Hall of Fame.

=== American Farmland Trust ===
In 2025, it was announced that Moffitt would be returning to American Farmland Trust as a Senior Fellow where her work will focus on enhancing the vitality of rural America by supporting farmers and ranchers in building diverse, profitable, and resilient farming operations now and into the future. As Senior Fellow, Moffitt help envision and launch AFT's "Thriving Farms and Ranches" initiative and co-authored "In Support of America's Farmers and Ranchers: A Call to Action". In 2026, Moffitt was promoted to Vice President of Farmland Protection and Strategic Priorities, where she leads AFT's efforts to protect farmland and keep farming viable. Her work focuses on advancing direct conservation and land transfer initiatives, strengthening capacity building efforts, elevating information and knowledge sharing strategies, and creating new and better markets so that farmers and ranchers can remain on the land, now and into the future.

== Personal life ==
Moffitt is the daughter of Russ and Kathy Lester and has four sisters. She is married to Gregory Moffitt, an educator and former school principal. Moffitt currently lives in Washington, DC with her husband and their teenage daughter.
