= George Logan (Connecticut politician) =

American politician (born 1969)

Member of the Connecticut Senate from the 17th district
- In office January 5, 2017 – January 5, 2021
- Preceded by: Joseph Crisco Jr.
- Succeeded by: Jorge Cabrera

Personal details
- Born: George S. Logan; March 5, 1969 (age 57) New Haven, Connecticut, U.S.
- Party: Republican
- Education: Trinity College (BS); University of Bridgeport (MS)

George S. Logan (born March 5, 1969) is an American politician and member of the Republican Party. He served as a member of the Connecticut State Senate from 2017 to 2021. He was the Republican nominee for Connecticut's 5th congressional district in the 2022 United States House of Representatives elections in Connecticut, ultimately losing to Jahana Hayes by less than one percentage point.

== Childhood ==
George Logan was born in New Haven, Connecticut. His parents were born and raised in Guatemala, and they immigrated to the United States as adults in the mid-1960s; three of his grandparents were originally from Jamaica, while the fourth was originally from Nicaragua.

== Education ==
Logan graduated from Notre Dame High School. He earned a Bachelor of Science degree in engineering from Trinity College and a Master of Science in mechanical engineering from the University of Bridgeport.

== Career ==
Before serving as a legislator, he was an engineer and executive for the Aquarion Water Company. After his election to the Senate, he served as the Director of Environmental Management for the company until 2020. Since 2020, Logan has been the Director of Community Relations at Aquarion.

== Political career ==
=== State Senate ===
He served as a member of the Connecticut State Senate representing Connecticut's 17th district in the State Senate. Logan was first elected in 2016, upsetting 24-year incumbent Democrat Joseph Crisco Jr. He was the first black Republican elected to the state's Senate. In 2018, he was reelected, after a recount, over labor union activist Jorge Cabrera. On November 3, 2020, he was narrowly defeated by Cabrera in a rematch. He conceded on November 5.

=== 2022 U.S. House campaign ===
On July 21, 2021, Logan announced a run for the 2022 United States House of Representatives elections in Connecticut challenging Democratic incumbent Jahana Hayes in Connecticut's 5th congressional district. Logan lost by 2,004 votes out of 253,672; an automatic recount would have taken place if the margin were under 1,250 votes. The Hartford Courant attributed his defeat to Hayes's winning performance in the relatively affluent middle-class suburbs of the Northwest Corner and the Farmington Valley. Those areas were previously reliably won by Nancy Johnson, the most recent Republican to represent the 5th district.

=== 2024 U.S. House campaign ===
On October 2, 2023, Logan announced his campaign for Connecticut's 5th congressional district in the 2024 United States House of Representatives elections. He lost to Hayes in a rematch.

== Personal life ==
Logan is the frontman for the Jimi Hendrix tribute band Electric Lady Band USA, which often plays in Connecticut venues such as Toad's Place in New Haven. He is married and has two children. He is fluent in Spanish, and is a self-described Afro-Latino.
