= Jahana Hayes =

American educator and politician (born 1973)

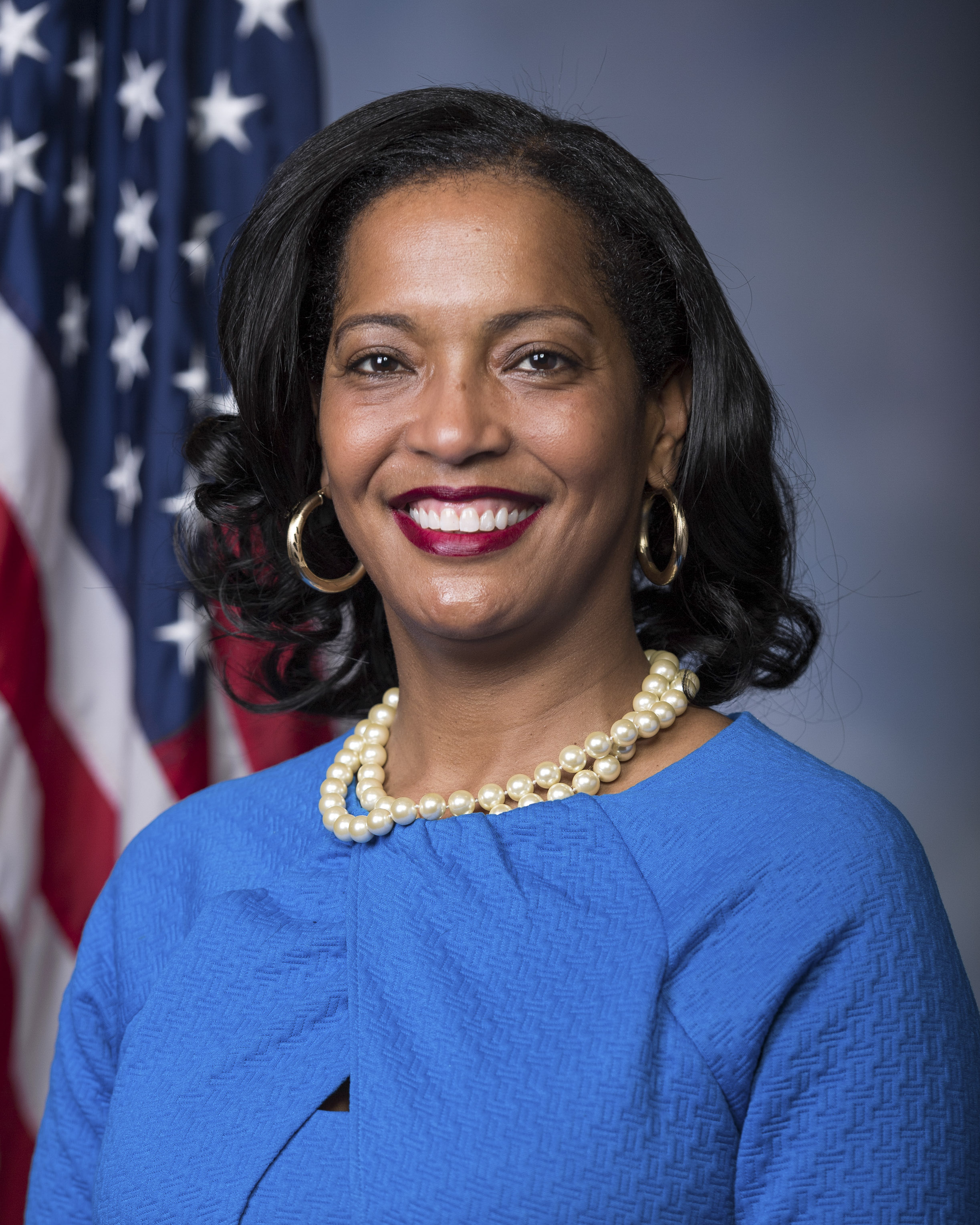
- Official portrait, 2018

Member of the U.S. House of Representatives from Connecticut's 5th district
- Incumbent
- Assumed office January 3, 2019
- Preceded by: Elizabeth Esty

Personal details
- Born: Jahana Flemming; March 8, 1973 (age 53) Waterbury, Connecticut, U.S.
- Party: Democratic
- Spouse: Milford Hayes
- Children: 4
- Education: Naugatuck Valley Community College (AA); Southern Connecticut State University (BA); University of Saint Joseph (MA); University of Bridgeport (SYC)
- Website: House website Campaign website
- Hayes's voice Hayes on student mental health following the COVID-19 pandemic. Recorded September 29, 2022

Jahana Hayes (née Flemming: born March 8, 1973) is an American politician serving as the U.S. representative for Connecticut's 5th congressional district since 2019. The district, once represented by U.S. Senator Chris Murphy, comprises much of the state's northwestern portion, including New Britain, Danbury, and Waterbury. A member of the Democratic Party, Hayes became the first Black woman elected to represent Connecticut in Congress. She was recognized as the National Teacher of the Year in 2016.

== Early life and education ==
Hayes was born on March 8, 1973, in Waterbury, Connecticut, and grew up in public housing projects in that city. Hayes became a teen mother prior to graduating from high school. She earned an associate degree at Naugatuck Valley Community College and a bachelor's degree at Southern Connecticut State University. In 2012, Hayes earned a master's degree in curriculum and instruction at the University of Saint Joseph. In 2014, she earned her Sixth-Year Diploma from the University of Bridgeport School of Education.

== Teaching career ==
Hayes's first job was at the Southbury Training School in Connecticut. She went on to teach government and history at John F. Kennedy High School in Waterbury. She also chaired the Kennedy SOAR Review Board, a "school within a school" that provided advanced instruction for gifted students, and was a co-adviser of HOPE, a student-service club at Kennedy. In 2015, she was John F. Kennedy Teacher of the Year and then the Waterbury School District Educator of the Year. In 2016 she was named National Teacher of the Year.

After winning the award, Hayes told The Washington Post: "I really think that we need to change the narrative, change the dialogue about what teaching is as a profession. We've spent a lot of time in the last few years talking about the things that are not working. We really need to shift our attention to all the things that are working." Appearing on Ellen DeGeneres's talk show, Hayes said she "teaches kindness." After receiving the award, she addressed the annual meeting of the National Education Association.

== U.S. House of Representatives ==
=== Elections ===
==== 2018 ====
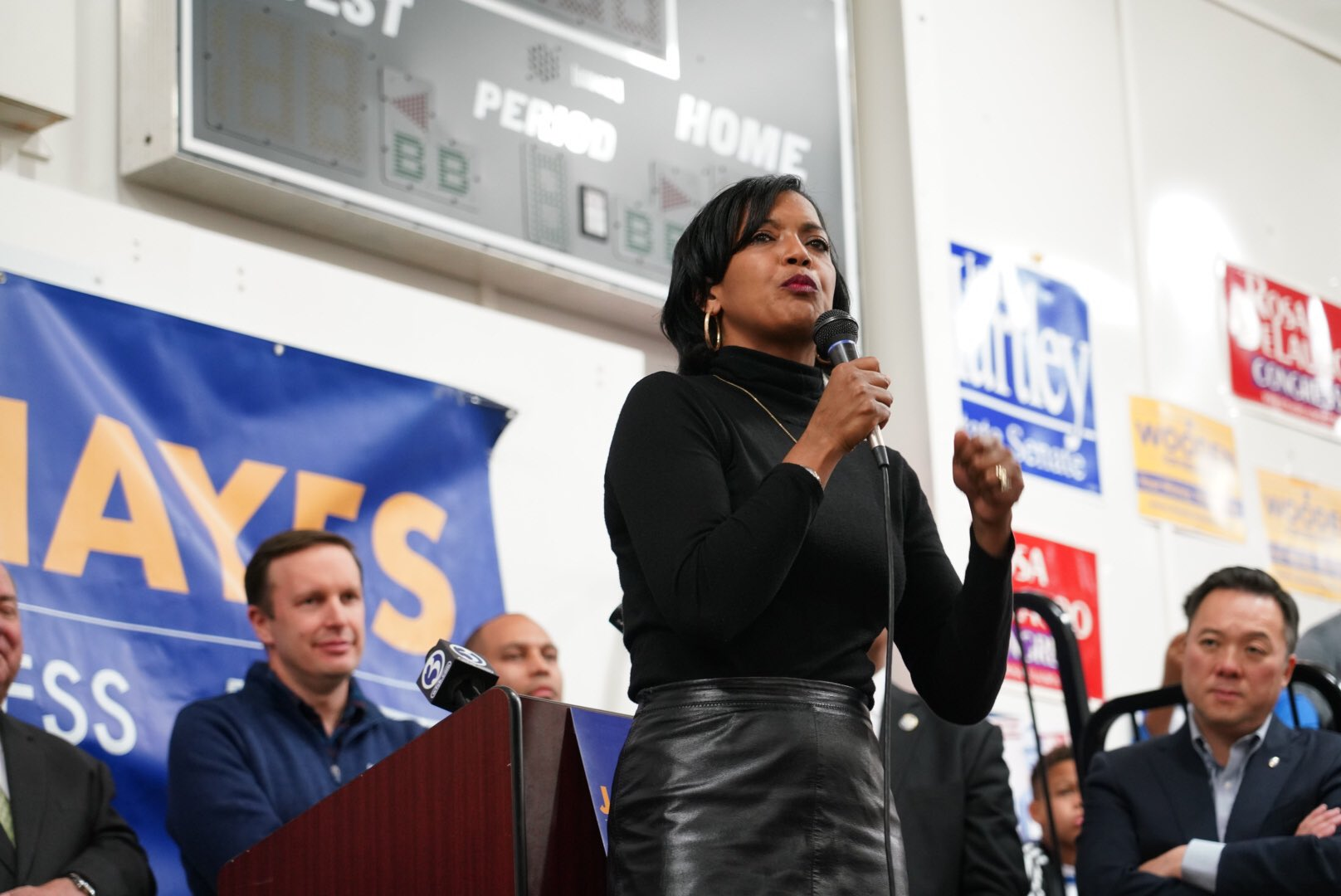
Hayes speaking at a 2018 campaign event with Senator Chris Murphy

In 2018, Hayes ran for the Democratic nomination for Connecticut's 5th congressional district.

Hayes won the primary on August 14, beating Simsbury First Selectman Mary Glassman, who was endorsed by the Connecticut Democratic Party, 62% to 38%. In the November general election, she faced Republican Manny Santos, a former mayor of Meriden.

Hayes supports public education and teachers' unions, and has credited her "union brothers and sisters" with playing a role in her success. In the 2018 election, she was endorsed by the Connecticut Education Association. Her candidacy was also supported by the Connecticut Working Families Party (CTWFP).

On November 6, Hayes declared victory, becoming the first black Democratic House member from Connecticut. She and Ayanna Pressley of Massachusetts's 7th congressional district were the first women of color to be elected to Congress from New England.

==== 2020 ====
Hayes was reelected, defeating the Republican nominee, former federal prosecutor David X. Sullivan, with 55.1% of the vote.

==== 2022 ====
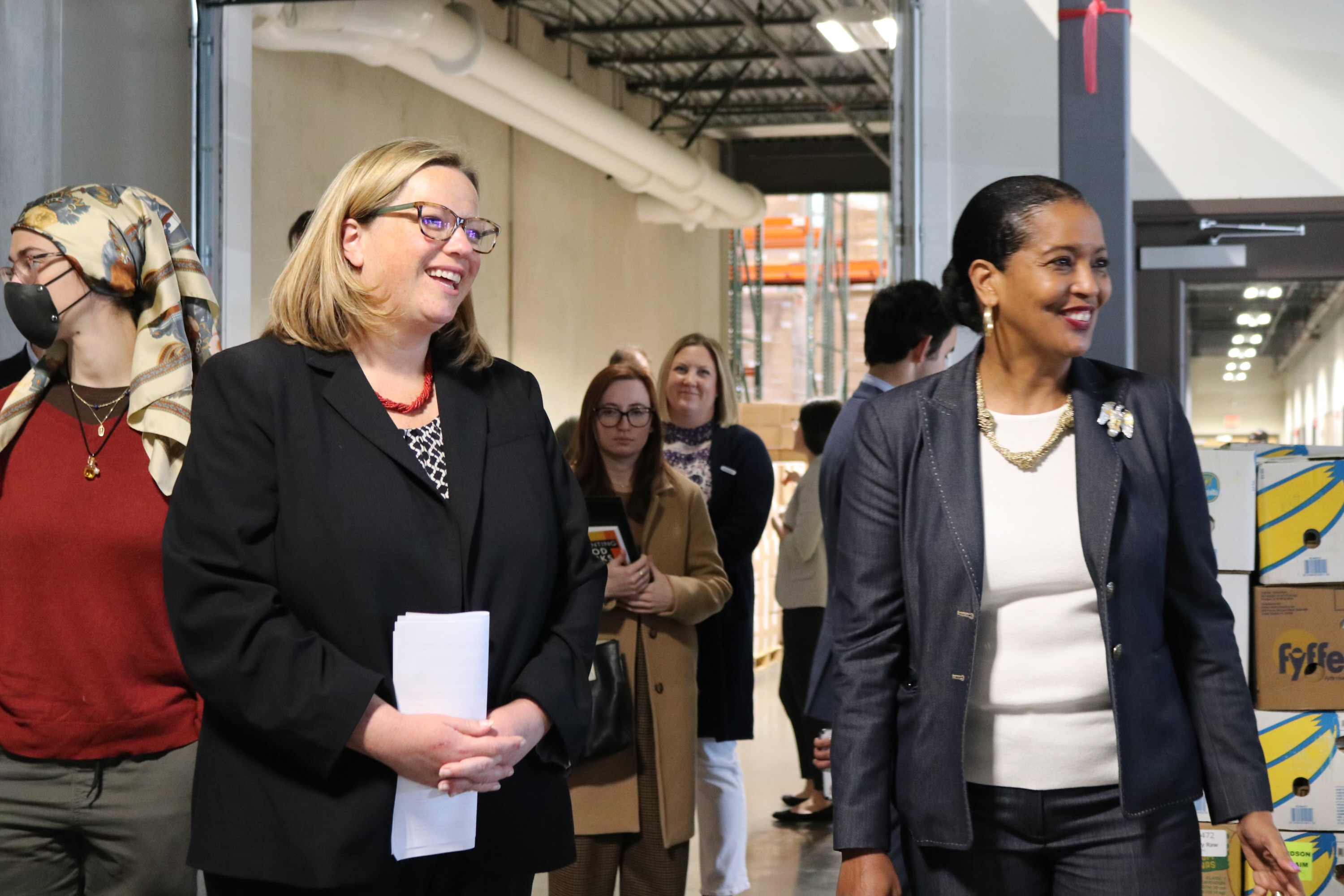
Hayes with USDA Undersecretary Jennifer Moffitt in 2022

Hayes ran for reelection in 2022 and faced the most competitive election of her career. She narrowly defeated Republican state Senator George Logan in the general with a margin of 0.8%.

She was questioned during the campaign about the ethics of hiring two of her children to work and receive a salary as campaign staffers.

==== 2024 ====
In 2024, Hayes defeated Republican nominee George Logan in a rematch of the 2022 election.

=== Tenure ===
Hayes was sworn into office on January 3, 2019, as the U.S. representative for Connecticut's 5th congressional district. During the 116th Congress, she was appointed to the Education and Labor and Agriculture committees. In December 2019, she voted for the first impeachment of Donald Trump. A year later, she voted for Trump's second impeachment following the attack on the U.S. Capitol.

After the 2020 elections, Hayes was reported to be on the shortlist for Secretary of Education in the incoming Biden administration, though the role eventually went to Connecticut State Commissioner of Education Miguel Cardona. At the start of her second term, Hayes circulated a letter to the Republican House leadership urging it not to place Representative Marjorie Taylor Greene on the House Education Committee, citing Greene's claims that mass school shootings, including the Sandy Hook Elementary School shooting, which occurred in Hayes's district, were false flag operations.

In May 2023, during her third term, Hayes was among the 46 Democrats who voted against final passage of the Fiscal Responsibility Act of 2023 in the House. The following month, during the United States House Committee on Education and the Workforce hearings on a proposed federal ban on transgender athletes, she criticized the bill, stating, "We are talking about a very small percentage ... So this hearing, this legislation, these conversations further put a target on the backs of these students who are already in the scariest times of their lives."

=== Committee assignments ===
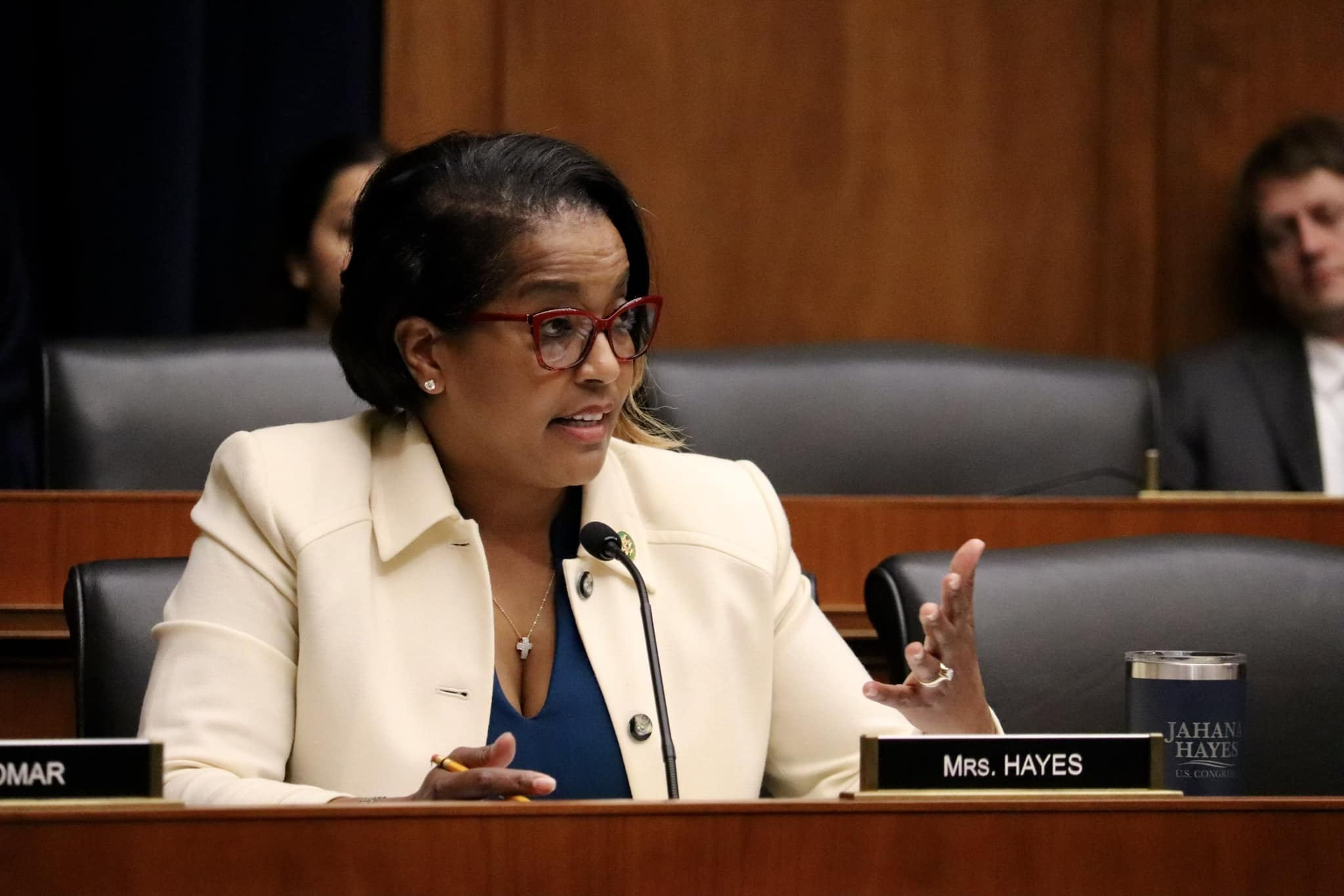
Hayes on the Education and Workforce Committee, 2024

For the 119th Congress:

- Committee on Agriculture
  - Subcommittee on Livestock, Dairy, and Poultry
  - Subcommittee on Nutrition and Foreign Agriculture (Ranking Member)
- Committee on Education and Workforce
  - Subcommittee on Early Childhood, Elementary, and Secondary Education
  - Subcommittee on Health, Employment, Labor, and Pensions

=== Caucus memberships ===
Hayes's caucus memberships include:

- Black Maternal Health Caucus
- New Democrat Coalition
- Congressional Equality Caucus
- Congressional Black Caucus (Educating for the Future Task Force, chair)
- Gun Violence Prevention Task Force (deputy whip)
- Friends of Ireland Caucus (co-chair)
- College Affordability Caucus (chair)

== Political positions ==
In 2025, Hayes was one of 46 House Democrats who joined Republicans to vote for the Laken Riley Act. The bill requires mandatory detention without bail of undocumented immigrants charged with a crime, even if they are not convicted.

== Personal life ==
Hayes is married to her husband, Milford, who is a police detective. They live in Wolcott, north of Waterbury, with their four children.

== Electoral history ==
Democratic primary results, Connecticut 2018
Party	Candidate	Votes	%
Democratic	Jahana Hayes	24,693	62.27%
Democratic	Mary Glassman	14,964	37.73%
Total votes		39,657	100%

Connecticut's 5th congressional district results, 2018
Party	Candidate	Votes	%
Democratic	Jahana Hayes	142,901	52.80%
Working Families	Jahana Hayes	8,324	3.08%
Total	Jahana Hayes	151,225	55.87%
Republican	Manny Santos	115,146	42.54%
Independent Party	Manny Santos	4,280	1.58%
Total	Manny Santos	119,426	44.12%
Write-in		13	0.01%
Total votes		270,664	100%
Democratic hold			

Connecticut's 5th congressional district results, 2020
Party	Candidate	Votes	%
Democratic	Jahana Hayes	183,797	52.58%
Working Families	Jahana Hayes	8,687	2.49%
Total	Jahana Hayes (incumbent)	192,484	55.07%
Republican	David X. Sullivan	151,988	43.48%
Independent Party	Bruce W. Walczak	5,052	1.45%
Total votes		349,524	100%
Democratic hold			

Connecticut's 5th congressional district results, 2022
Party	Candidate	Votes	%
Democratic	Jahana Hayes	123,818	48.81%
Working Families	Jahana Hayes	4,020	1.58%
Total	Jahana Hayes (incumbent)	127,838	50.39%
Republican	George Logan	123,342	48.62%
Independent Party	George Logan	2,492	0.98%
Total	George Logan	125,834	49.61%
Total votes		253,672	100%
Democratic hold			

2024 Connecticut's 5th congressional district election
Party	Candidate	Votes	%
Democratic	Jahana Hayes	170,243	50.72%
Working Families	Jahana Hayes	8,886	2.65%
Total	Jahana Hayes (incumbent)	179,129	53.36%
Republican	George Logan	156,470	46.61%
Write-in		79	0.02%
Total votes		335,678	100%
Democratic hold			

== See also ==
- List of African-American United States representatives
- Women in the United States House of Representatives

U.S. House of Representatives
Preceded by Elizabeth Esty	Member of the U.S. House of Representatives from Connecticut's 5th congressional district 2019–present	Incumbent
U.S. order of precedence (ceremonial)
Preceded by Josh Harder	United States representatives by seniority 207th	Succeeded by Chrissy Houlahan
