= Farmington Valley =

Large populated valley in Hartford County, Connecticut, US

Geography
- Location: Connecticut
- Population centers: Parts of Avon, Canton, Farmington, Granby, Simsbury
- Borders on: Northwest Hills (Connecticut) (west), Talcott Mountain (east)

The Farmington Valley is located along the western boundary of Hartford County in Connecticut, bordering Litchfield County immediately to the west. It is defined by the Farmington River, which runs through it. Physiographically, the valley is lowlands and floodplain flanked by the Litchfield Hills on the west (which itself is the northern terminus of the larger Mid-Atlantic Highlands Region) and Talcott Mountain on the east (a section of the more extensive Metacomet Ridge).

The term Farmington Valley, as used in the local vernacular, refers primarily to the towns of Farmington, Avon, Simsbury, Canton and Granby. However, when defined by the course of the Farmington River, or by its entire watershed, the term can refer to large areas of land across the north central portion of Connecticut and into southern Massachusetts.

== Education ==
The Farmington Valley is home to five individual school districts, the Avon Public Schools, Canton Public Schools, Granby Public Schools, Farmington Public Schools, and Simsbury Public Schools.

There are multiple boarding schools located in the valley including, Avon Old Farms, Miss Porter's School, the Ethel Walker School, and the Westminster School.

== Healthcare ==
=== Hospitals ===
The University of Connecticut Health Center is the major hospital serving the Farmington Valley.
