= 2008 United States presidential election in Connecticut =

- November 4, 2008
- Turnout: 78.14%

Nominee	Barack Obama	John McCain
Party	Democratic	Republican
Home state	Illinois	Arizona
Running mate	Joe Biden	Sarah Palin
Electoral vote	7	0
Popular vote	997,773	629,428
Percentage	60.59%	38.22%

Obama
40–50%
50–60%
60–70%
70–80%
80–90%
90–100%
McCain
40–50%
50–60%
President before election
George W. Bush
Republican
Elected President
Barack Obama
Democratic

The 2008 United States presidential election in Connecticut took place on November 4, 2008, and was part of the 2008 United States presidential election. Voters chose seven representatives, or electors to the Electoral College, who voted for president and vice president.

Connecticut was won by Democratic nominee Barack Obama with a 22.4% margin of victory. Connecticut was one of the six states that had every county—including traditionally Republican Litchfield County—go for Obama, the others being Hawaii, Massachusetts, New Hampshire, Rhode Island, and Vermont. Connecticut has not voted for a Republican presidential nominee since 1988 when the state was carried by George H. W. Bush over Michael Dukakis. As of the 2024 presidential election, this is the last election in which Litchfield County voted for the Democratic candidate, also making it the last time any presidential candidate has won every single county in the state.

To date, this is the last time that the city of Torrington and the towns of Barkhamsted, Colebrook, New Hartford, Preston, Scotland, Thompson, and Winchester voted Democratic. The town of Warren would not vote Democratic again until 2024.

== Primaries ==
- 2008 Connecticut Democratic presidential primary
- 2008 Connecticut Republican presidential primary

== Campaign ==
=== Predictions ===
There were 16 news organizations who made state-by-state predictions of the election. Here are their last predictions before election day:

Source	Ranking
D.C. Political Report	Likely D
Cook Political Report	Solid D
The Takeaway	Solid D
Electoral-vote.com	Solid D
Washington Post	Solid D
Politico	Solid D
RealClearPolitics	Solid D
FiveThirtyEight	Solid D
CQ Politics	Solid D
The New York Times	Solid D
CNN	Safe D
NPR	Solid D
MSNBC	Solid D
Fox News	Likely D
Associated Press	Likely D
Rasmussen Reports	Safe D

=== Polling ===
Barack Obama won every single poll taken in the state, and every one of them by a double-digit margin of victory.

=== Fundraising ===
John McCain raised a total of $3,966,985. Barack Obama raised $9,727,617.

=== Advertising and visits ===
Obama spent $730,335 while McCain spent nothing on the state. Neither campaign visited the state.

== Analysis ==
Connecticut is a part of New England, an area of the country that has in recent decades become a Democratic stronghold. The state went Republican in most of the elections from 1948 to 1988, the exceptions being the three in the 1960s. However, following Bill Clinton's narrow victory in the state in 1992, it has not been seriously contested by Republicans since. McCain ceded the state to Obama early on, despite the endorsement of the state's incumbent Senator Joe Lieberman, a Democrat-turned-Independent who still caucused with the Democrats but backed McCain for president in 2008.

In 2006, Democrats knocked off two incumbent Republicans and picked up two U.S. House seats in CT-02 and CT-05 (Joe Courtney and Chris Murphy, respectively). Although then-Governor M. Jodi Rell and Lieutenant Governor Michael Fedele were both moderate Republicans, all other statewide offices were held by Democrats. Democrats also enjoyed a supermajority status in both chambers of the Connecticut state legislature.

In 2008, Democrat Jim Himes defeated incumbent Republican Christopher Shays, who was at the time the only Republican member of the U.S. House from New England, for the U.S. House seat in Connecticut's 4th congressional district. This was largely because Obama carried the district with a staggering 60% of the vote—one of his best performances in a Republican-held district. Shays' defeat meant that for the first time in almost 150 years, there were no Republican Representatives from New England. In no other part of the country is a major political party completely shut out. At the state level, Democrats picked up 6 seats in the Connecticut House of Representatives and 1 seat in the Connecticut Senate.

== Results ==
2008 United States presidential election in Connecticut
Party	Candidate	Votes	Percentage	Electoral votes
Democratic	Barack Obama	997,773	60.59%	7
Republican	John McCain	629,428	38.22%	0
Independent	Ralph Nader	19,162	1.16%	0
Constitution (Write-in)	Chuck Baldwin (Write-in)	311	0.02%	0
Green (Write-in)	Cynthia A. McKinney (Write-in)	90	0.01%	0
Socialist (Write-in)	Brian Moore (Write-in)	19	0.00%	0
Socialist Workers (Write-in)	Roger Calero (Write-in)	10	0.00%	0
Totals		1,646,793	100.00%	7
Voter turnout (voting age population)				62.1%

=== By county ===
County	Barack Obama Democratic		John McCain Republican		Various candidates Other parties		Margin		Total votes cast
County	#	%	#	%	#	%	#	%	Total votes cast
Fairfield	242,936	58.72%	167,736	40.54%	3,059	0.74%	75,200	18.18%	413,741
Hartford	268,721	65.11%	138,984	33.67%	5,023	1.21%	129,737	31.44%	412,728
Litchfield	51,041	51.57%	46,173	46.66%	1,752	1.77%	4,868	4.91%	98,966
Middlesex	52,984	60.72%	32,918	37.73%	1,351	1.55%	20,066	22.99%	87,253
New Haven	233,589	61.01%	144,650	37.78%	4,647	1.22%	88,939	23.23%	382,886
New London	74,776	59.88%	48,491	38.83%	1,607	1.29%	26,285	21.05%	124,874
Tolland	45,043	59.67%	29,266	38.76%	1,182	1.57%	15,777	20.91%	75,501
Windham	28,673	56.39%	21,210	41.72%	961	1.89%	7,463	14.67%	50,844
Totals	997,773	60.59%	629,428	38.22%	19,592	1.19%	368,345	22.37%	1,646,793

Counties that flipped from Republican to Democratic

- Litchfield (largest borough: Litchfield)

=== By congressional district ===
Barack Obama carried all five of Connecticut's congressional districts.

District	McCain	Obama	Representative
1st	33%	66%	John Larson
2nd	40%	58%	Joe Courtney
3rd	36%	62%	Rosa DeLauro
4th	40%	60%	Chris Shays (110th Congress)
4th	40%	60%	Jim Himes (111th Congress)
5th	42%	56%	Chris Murphy

== Electors ==
Technically the voters of Connecticut cast their ballots for electors: representatives to the Electoral College. Connecticut is allocated 7 electors because it has 5 congressional districts and 2 senators. All candidates who appear on the ballot or qualify to receive write-in votes must submit a list of 7 electors, who pledge to vote for their candidate and their running mate. Whoever wins the majority of votes in the state is awarded all sevenelectoral votes. Their chosen electors then vote for president and vice president. Although electors are pledged to their candidate and running mate, they are not obligated to vote for them. An elector who votes for someone other than their candidate is known as a faithless elector.

The electors of each state and the District of Columbia met on December 15, 2008, to cast their votes for president and vice president. The Electoral College itself never meets as one body. Instead the electors from each state and the District of Columbia met in their respective capitols.

The following were the members of the Electoral College from the state. All 7 were pledged to Barack Obama and Joe Biden:

1. Shirley Steinmetz
2. Nicholas Paindiris
3. Andrea Jackson-Brooks
4. Jim Ezzes
5. Lorraine McQueen
6. Deborah McFadden
7. Ken Delacruz

== See also ==
- United States presidential elections in Connecticut
- Presidency of Barack Obama
