= Justice Beardsley =

Justice Beardsley may refer to:

- Herman R. Beardsley (1800–1878), associate justice of the Vermont Supreme Court
- Samuel Beardsley, justice of the New York Supreme Court (the trial court of New York)
- Sidney Burr Beardsley (1823–1890), associate justice of the Connecticut Supreme Court
