= Connecticut's 4th congressional district =

U.S. House district for Connecticut

Coordinates: 41°11′49″N 73°23′19″W

- Interactive map of district boundaries since January 3, 2023
- Representative: Jim Himes; D–Cos Cob
- Area: 539 mi^{2} (1,400 km^{2})
- Distribution: 95.76% urban; 4.24% rural
- Population (2025): 745,862
- Median household income: $126,726
- Ethnicity: 56.9% White; 21.6% Hispanic; 11.4% Black; 5.5% Asian; 3.5% Two or more races; 1.1% other
- Cook PVI: D+13

Connecticut's 4th congressional district is a congressional district in the U.S. state of Connecticut. Located in the panhandle, the district is largely suburban and extends from Bridgeport, the largest city in the state, to Greenwich – an area largely coextensive with the Connecticut side of the New York metropolitan area. The district also extends inland, toward Danbury and toward the Lower Naugatuck Valley.

The district is currently represented by Democrat Jim Himes. With a Cook Partisan Voting Index rating of D+13, it is the most Democratic district in Connecticut, a state with an all-Democratic congressional delegation. It is also the wealthiest district in the state of Connecticut and the sixteenth wealthiest district in the United States, with 30.6 percent of households earning over $200,000, per a 2024 study.

Historically, the 4th was a classic "Yankee Republican" district. However, it has not supported a Republican for president since 1988, and has swung increasingly Democratic at the national level since the 1990s. This culminated in 2020, when Joe Biden won it with 64 percent of the vote, his best showing in the state.

However, even as the district swung increasingly Democratic at the national level, Republicans usually held this district without serious difficulty until the turn of the millennium. In 2004, however, Democrat Diane Farrell held longtime incumbent Chris Shays to only 52 percent of the vote, the closest race in the district in 30 years. Shays fended off an equally spirited challenge from Farrell in 2006 before losing to Himes in 2008. Himes has held the seat ever since.

== Composition ==
For the 118th and successive Congresses (based on redistricting following the 2020 census), Connecticut's 4th district contains portions of three planning regions and 18 municipalities.

Greater Bridgeport Planning Region (5)

Bridgeport, Easton, Fairfield, Monroe, Trumbull

Naugatuck Valley Planning Region (2)

Oxford, Shelton (part; also 3rd)

Western Connecticut Planning Region (11)

Darien, Greenwich, New Canaan, Norwalk, Redding, Ridgefield, Stamford, Weston, Westport, Wilton

=== Voter registration ===
Voter registration and party enrollment as of October 30, 2012
Party	Active	Inactive	Total	Percentage
Democratic	141,355	9,427	150,782	36.17%
Republican	98,663	5,106	103,769	24.89%
Minor Parties	3,737	312	4,049	0.97%
Unaffiliated	146,218	12,043	158,261	37.97%
Total	389,973	26,888	416,861	100.00%

== Recent election results from statewide races ==
Year	Office	Results
2008	President	Obama 60% - 39%
2010	Senate	Blumenthal 52% - 47%
2010	Governor	Malloy 50% - 49%
2012	President	Obama 56% - 44%
2012	Senate	Murphy 54% - 46%
2014	Governor	Malloy 50% - 49%
2016	President	Clinton 60% - 36%
2016	Senate	Blumenthal 62% - 36%
2018	Senate	Murphy 63% - 36%
2018	Governor	Lamont 54% - 44%
2018	Attorney General	Tong 58% - 42%
2020	President	Biden 65% - 34%
2022	Senate	Blumenthal 61% - 39%
2022	Governor	Lamont 60% - 39%
2022	Secretary of the State	Thomas 58% - 40%
2022	Treasurer	Russell 53% - 45%
2022	Comptroller	Scanlon 57% - 43%
2022	Attorney General	Tong 59% - 40%
2024	President	Harris 61% - 38%
2024	Senate	Murphy 62% - 37%

== Recent elections ==
=== 1987 (special) ===
Connecticut 4th congressional district election, 1987: Connecticut District 4
Party	Candidate	Votes	%	±%
Republican	Christopher Shays	50,518	57%	
Democratic	Christine Niedermeier	37,293	42%	
Republican hold		Swing		
Turnout		87,811	100%	

=== 1988 ===
Connecticut 4th congressional district election, 1988: Connecticut District 4
Party	Candidate	Votes	%	±%
Republican	Christopher Shays (incumbent)	147,843	72%	
Democratic	Roger J. Pearson	55,751	27%	
Republican hold		Swing		
Turnout		203,594	100%	

=== 1990 ===
Connecticut 4th congressional district election, 1990: Connecticut District 4
Party	Candidate	Votes	%	±%
Republican	Christopher Shays (incumbent)	105,682	77%	
Democratic	Al Smith	32,352	23%	
Republican hold		Swing		
Turnout		138,034	100%	

=== 1992 ===
Connecticut 4th congressional district election, 1992: Connecticut District 4
Party	Candidate	Votes	%	±%
Republican	Christopher Shays (incumbent)	147,816	67%	
Democratic	Dave Schropfer	58,666	27%	
A Connecticut Party (1990)	Al Smith	11,679	5%	
Natural Law	Ronald M. Fried	1,445	1%	
Republican hold		Swing		
Turnout		219,606	100%	

=== 1994 ===
Connecticut 4th congressional district election, 1994: Connecticut District 4
Party	Candidate	Votes	%	±%
Republican	Christopher Shays (incumbent)	109,436	74%	
Democratic	Jonathan Kantrowitz	34,962	24%	
Libertarian	Irving Sussman	1,976	1%	
Natural Law	Terry M. Nevas	688	0.47%	
Republican hold		Swing		
Turnout		147,062	100%	

=== 1996 ===
Connecticut 4th congressional district election, 1996: Connecticut District 4
Party	Candidate	Votes	%	±%
Republican	Christopher Shays (incumbent)	121,949	60%	
Democratic	William Finch	75,902	38%	
Libertarian	Edward H. Tonkin	2,815	1%	
Natural Law	Terry M. Nevas	1,046	1%	
Republican hold		Swing		
Turnout		201,712	100%	

=== 1998 ===
Connecticut 4th congressional district election, 1998: Connecticut District 4
Party	Candidate	Votes	%	±%
Republican	Christopher Shays (incumbent)	94,767	69%	
Democratic	Jonathan Kantrowitz	40,988	28%	
Libertarian	Marshall C. Harrison	1,449	1%	
Republican hold		Swing		
Turnout		137,204	100%	

=== 2000 ===
Connecticut 4th congressional district election, 2000: Connecticut District 4
Party	Candidate	Votes	%	±%
Republican	Christopher Shays (incumbent)	119,155	58%	
Democratic	Stephanie Sanchez	84,472	41%	
Libertarian	Daniel Gislao	2,034	1%	
Independent	Frank M. Don	1,097	0.53%	
Republican hold		Swing		
Turnout		206,758	100%	

=== 2002 ===
Connecticut 4th congressional district election, 2002: Connecticut District 4
Party	Candidate	Votes	%	±%
Republican	Christopher Shays (incumbent)	113,197	64%	
Democratic	Stephanie Sanchez	62,491	36%	
Republican hold		Swing		
Turnout		175,688	100%	

=== 2004 ===
Connecticut 4th congressional district election, 2004: Connecticut District 4
Party	Candidate	Votes	%	±%
Republican	Christopher Shays (incumbent)	149,891	52%	
Democratic	Diane Farrell	136,481	48%	
Republican hold		Swing		
Turnout		286,372	100%	

=== 2006 ===
Connecticut 4th congressional district election, 2006: Connecticut District 4
Party	Candidate	Votes	%	±%
Republican	Christopher Shays (incumbent)	106,510	51%	
Democratic	Diane Farrell	99,450	48%	
Libertarian	Phil Maymin	3,058	1%	
Republican hold		Swing		
Turnout		209,018	100%	

=== 2008 ===
Connecticut 4th congressional district election, 2008: Connecticut District 4
Party	Candidate	Votes	%	±%
Democratic	Jim Himes	159,694	51%	
Republican	Christopher Shays (incumbent)	147,356	47%	
Libertarian	Michael A. Carrano	2,036	1%	
Green	Richard Z. Duffee	1,377	0.44%	
Turnout		310,463	100%	
Democratic gain from Republican		Swing		

=== 2010 ===
Connecticut 4th congressional district election, 2010: Connecticut District 4
Party	Candidate	Votes	%	±%
Democratic	Jim Himes (incumbent)	115,351	53%	
Republican	Dan Debicella	102,030	47%	
Turnout		217,381	100%	
Democratic hold		Swing		

=== 2012 ===
Connecticut 4th Congressional District Election, 2012
Party	Candidate	Votes	%	±%
Democratic	Jim Himes (incumbent)	174,461	60%	
Republican	Steve Obsitnik	117,463	40%	
Turnout		291,924	100%	
Democratic hold		Swing		

=== 2014 ===
Connecticut 4th Congressional District Election, 2014
Party	Candidate	Votes	%	±%
Democratic	Jim Himes (incumbent)	106,873	54%	
Republican	Dan Debicella	91,922	46%	
Turnout		198,800	100%	
Democratic hold		Swing		

=== 2016 ===
Connecticut 4th Congressional District Election, 2016
Party	Candidate	Votes	%	±%
Democratic	Jim Himes (incumbent)	185,928	60%	
Republican	John Shaban	123,630	40%	
Turnout		309,558	100%	
Democratic hold		Swing		

=== 2018 ===
Connecticut 4th Congressional District Election, 2018
Party	Candidate	Votes	%	±%
Democratic	Jim Himes (incumbent)	168,726	61%	
Republican	Harry Arora	106,921	38%	
Turnout		275,651	100%	
Democratic hold		Swing		

=== 2020 ===
Connecticut 4th Congressional District Election, 2020
Party	Candidate	Votes	%	±%
Democratic	Jim Himes (incumbent)	223,832	62%	
Republican	Jonathan Riddle	130,627	36%	
Independent	Brian Merlen	5,656	1%	
Write-in	N/A	10	0%	
Turnout		360,125	100%	
Democratic hold		Swing		

=== 2022 ===
Connecticut 4th Congressional District Election, 2022
Party	Candidate	Votes	%	±%
Democratic	Jim Himes (incumbent)	140,262	59.4%	−2.6
Republican	Jayme Stevenson	95,822	40.6%	+4.6
Turnout		236,084	100%	
Democratic hold		Swing		

=== 2024 ===
Connecticut 4th Congressional District Election, 2024
Party	Candidate	Votes	%	±%
Democratic	Jim Himes (incumbent)	200,791	61.1%	+1.7
Republican	Michael Goldstein	122,793	37.3%	−3.3
Independent	Benjamin Wesley	5,273	1.6%	
Turnout		328,857	100%	
Democratic hold		Swing		

== List of members representing the district ==
Member (Residence)	Party	Years of service	Cong ress(es)	Electoral history	Location
District created March 4, 1837
Thomas T. Whittlesey (Danbury)	Democratic	March 4, 1837 – March 3, 1839	25th	Redistricted from the at-large district and re-elected in 1837. Lost re-election.	
Thomas B. Osborne (Fairfield)	Whig	March 4, 1839 – March 3, 1843	26th 27th	Elected in 1839. Re-elected in 1840. Retired.	
Samuel Simons (Bridgeport)	Democratic	March 4, 1843 – March 3, 1845	28th	Elected in 1843. Retired.	
Truman Smith (Litchfield)	Whig	March 4, 1845 – March 3, 1849	29th 30th	Elected in 1845. Re-elected in 1847. Retired to run for U.S. senator.	
Thomas B. Butler (Norwalk)	Whig	March 4, 1849 – March 3, 1851	31st	Elected in 1849. Lost re-election.	
Origen S. Seymour (Litchfield)	Democratic	March 4, 1851 – March 3, 1855	32nd 33rd	Elected in 1851. Re-elected in 1853. Retired to become judge of the Connecticut Superior Court.	
William W. Welch (Norfolk)	American	March 4, 1855 – March 3, 1857	34th	Elected in 1855. Retired.	
William D. Bishop (Bridgeport)	Democratic	March 4, 1857 – March 3, 1859	35th	Elected in 1857. Lost re-election.	
Orris S. Ferry (Norwalk)	Republican	March 4, 1859 – March 3, 1861	36th	Elected in 1859. Lost re-election.	
George C. Woodruff (Litchfield)	Democratic	March 4, 1861 – March 3, 1863	37th	Elected in 1861. Lost re-election.	
John Henry Hubbard (Litchfield)	Republican	March 4, 1863 – March 3, 1867	38th 39th	Elected in 1863. Re-elected in 1865. Lost re-election.	
William Henry Barnum (Lime Rock)	Democratic	March 4, 1867 – May 18, 1876	40th 41st 42nd 43rd 44th	Elected in 1867. Re-elected in 1869. Re-elected in 1871. Re-elected in 1873. Re-elected in 1875. Resigned when elected U.S. senator.	
Vacant		May 18, 1876 – December 4, 1876	44th		
Levi Warner (Norwalk)	Democratic	December 4, 1876 – March 3, 1879	44th 45th	Elected to finish Barnum's term. Also elected to the next term in 1876. Retired.	
Frederick Miles (Chapinville)	Republican	March 4, 1879 – March 3, 1883	46th 47th	Elected in 1878. Re-elected in 1880. Retired.	
Edward Woodruff Seymour (Litchfield)	Democratic	March 4, 1883 – March 3, 1887	48th 49th	Elected in 1882. Re-elected in 1884. Retired.	
Miles T. Granger (Canaan)	Democratic	March 4, 1887 – March 3, 1889	50th	Elected in 1886. Retired.	
Frederick Miles (Chapinville)	Republican	March 4, 1889 – March 3, 1891	51st	Elected in 1888. Lost re-election.	
Robert E. De Forest (Bridgeport)	Democratic	March 4, 1891 – March 3, 1895	52nd 53rd	Elected in 1890. Re-elected in 1892. Lost re-election.	
Ebenezer J. Hill (Norwalk)	Republican	March 4, 1895 – March 3, 1913	54th 55th 56th 57th 58th 59th 60th 61st 62nd	Elected in 1894. Re-elected in 1896. Re-elected in 1898. Re-elected in 1900. Re-elected in 1902. Re-elected in 1904. Re-elected in 1906. Re-elected in 1908. Re-elected in 1910. Lost re-election.	
Jeremiah Donovan (South Norwalk)	Democratic	March 4, 1913 – March 3, 1915	63rd	Elected in 1912. Lost re-election.	
Ebenezer J. Hill (Norwalk)	Republican	March 4, 1915 – September 27, 1917	64th 65th	Elected in 1914. Re-elected in 1916. Died.	
Vacant		September 27, 1917 – November 6, 1917	65th		
Schuyler Merritt (Stamford)	Republican	November 6, 1917 – March 3, 1931	65th 66th 67th 68th 69th 70th 71st	Elected to finish Hill's term. Re-elected in 1918. Re-elected in 1920. Re-elected in 1922. Re-elected in 1924. Re-elected in 1926. Re-elected in 1928. Lost re-election.	
William L. Tierney (Greenwich)	Democratic	March 4, 1931 – March 3, 1933	72nd	Elected in 1930. Lost re-election.	
Schuyler Merritt (Stamford)	Republican	March 4, 1933 – January 3, 1937	73rd 74th	Elected in 1932. Re-elected in 1934. Lost re-election.	
Alfred N. Phillips (Stamford)	Democratic	January 3, 1937 – January 3, 1939	75th	Elected in 1936. Lost re-election.	
Albert E. Austin (Old Greenwich)	Republican	January 3, 1939 – January 3, 1941	76th	Elected in 1938. Lost re-election.	
Le Roy D. Downs (South Norwalk)	Democratic	January 3, 1941 – January 3, 1943	77th	Elected in 1940. Lost re-election.	
Clare Boothe Luce (Greenwich)	Republican	January 3, 1943 – January 3, 1947	78th 79th	Elected in 1942. Re-elected in 1944. Retired.	
John Davis Lodge (Westport)	Republican	January 3, 1947 – January 3, 1951	80th 81st	Elected in 1946. Re-elected in 1948. Retired to run for Governor of Connecticut.	
Albert P. Morano (Greenwich)	Republican	January 3, 1951 – January 3, 1959	82nd 83rd 84th 85th	Elected in 1950. Re-elected in 1952. Re-elected in 1954. Re-elected in 1956. Lost re-election.	
Donald J. Irwin (Norwalk)	Democratic	January 3, 1959 – January 3, 1961	86th	Elected in 1958. Lost re-election.	
Abner W. Sibal (Norwalk)	Republican	January 3, 1961 – January 3, 1965	87th 88th	Elected in 1960. Re-elected in 1962. Lost re-election.	
Donald J. Irwin (Norwalk)	Democratic	January 3, 1965 – January 3, 1969	89th 90th	Elected in 1964. Re-elected in 1966. Lost re-election.	
Lowell Weicker (Greenwich)	Republican	January 3, 1969 – January 3, 1971	91st	Elected in 1968. Retired to run for U.S. senator.	
Stewart McKinney (Westport)	Republican	January 3, 1971 – May 7, 1987	92nd 93rd 94th 95th 96th 97th 98th 99th 100th	Elected in 1970. Re-elected in 1972. Re-elected in 1974. Re-elected in 1976. Re-elected in 1978. Re-elected in 1980. Re-elected in 1982. Re-elected in 1984. Re-elected in 1986. Died.	
Vacant		May 7, 1987 – August 18, 1987	100th		
Christopher Shays (Bridgeport)	Republican	August 18, 1987 – January 3, 2009	100th 101st 102nd 103rd 104th 105th 106th 107th 108th 109th 110th	Elected to finish McKinney's term. Re-elected in 1988. Re-elected in 1990. Re-elected in 1992. Re-elected in 1994. Re-elected in 1996. Re-elected in 1998. Re-elected in 2000. Re-elected in 2002. Re-elected in 2004. Re-elected in 2006. Lost re-election.	
Christopher Shays (Bridgeport)	Republican	August 18, 1987 – January 3, 2009	100th 101st 102nd 103rd 104th 105th 106th 107th 108th 109th 110th	Elected to finish McKinney's term. Re-elected in 1988. Re-elected in 1990. Re-elected in 1992. Re-elected in 1994. Re-elected in 1996. Re-elected in 1998. Re-elected in 2000. Re-elected in 2002. Re-elected in 2004. Re-elected in 2006. Lost re-election.	1993–2003 [data missing]
Christopher Shays (Bridgeport)	Republican	August 18, 1987 – January 3, 2009	100th 101st 102nd 103rd 104th 105th 106th 107th 108th 109th 110th	Elected to finish McKinney's term. Re-elected in 1988. Re-elected in 1990. Re-elected in 1992. Re-elected in 1994. Re-elected in 1996. Re-elected in 1998. Re-elected in 2000. Re-elected in 2002. Re-elected in 2004. Re-elected in 2006. Lost re-election.	2003–2013
Jim Himes (Cos Cob)	Democratic	January 3, 2009 – present	111th 112th 113th 114th 115th 116th 117th 118th 119th	Elected in 2008. Re-elected in 2010. Re-elected in 2012. Re-elected in 2014. Re-elected in 2016. Re-elected in 2018. Re-elected in 2020. Re-elected in 2022. Re-elected in 2024. Re-elected in 2026.	2003–2013
Jim Himes (Cos Cob)	Democratic	January 3, 2009 – present	111th 112th 113th 114th 115th 116th 117th 118th 119th	Elected in 2008. Re-elected in 2010. Re-elected in 2012. Re-elected in 2014. Re-elected in 2016. Re-elected in 2018. Re-elected in 2020. Re-elected in 2022. Re-elected in 2024. Re-elected in 2026.	2013–2023
Jim Himes (Cos Cob)	Democratic	January 3, 2009 – present	111th 112th 113th 114th 115th 116th 117th 118th 119th	Elected in 2008. Re-elected in 2010. Re-elected in 2012. Re-elected in 2014. Re-elected in 2016. Re-elected in 2018. Re-elected in 2020. Re-elected in 2022. Re-elected in 2024. Re-elected in 2026.	2023–present

== See also ==
- Connecticut's congressional districts
- List of United States congressional districts
