= Frederick Miles =

American politician

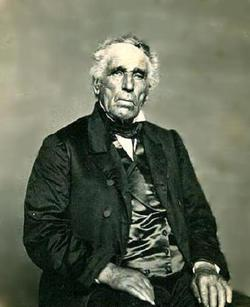

Member of the United States House of Representatives from Connecticut's 4th congressional district
- In office March 4, 1879 – March 3, 1883
- Preceded by: Levi Warner
- Succeeded by: Edward Woodruff Seymour
- In office March 4, 1889 – March 3, 1891
- Preceded by: Miles T. Granger
- Succeeded by: Robert E. De Forest

Member of the Connecticut Senate
- In office 1877–1879

Personal details
- Born: December 19, 1815 Goshen, Connecticut, US
- Died: November 20, 1896 (aged 80) Salisbury, Connecticut, US
- Party: Republican

Frederick Miles (December 19, 1815 – November 20, 1896) was a Republican member of the United States House of Representatives from Connecticut's 4th congressional district from 1879 to 1883 and from 1889 to 1891. He had previously served in the Connecticut Senate from 1877 to 1879.

== Early life ==
He was born in Goshen, Connecticut, where he attended the common schools and pursued an academic course. He engaged in mercantile pursuits in Goshen until 1857 before moving to Twin Lakes, Connecticut, and later, in 1858, to Salisbury, Connecticut, and engaged in the manufacture of iron.

== Political career ==
Miles was a member of the Connecticut Senate from 1877 until February 1879, when he resigned. He was elected to the Forty-sixth and Forty-seventh Congresses (March 4, 1879 – March 3, 1883) but he declined a nomination for reelection. Miles was again elected to the Fifty-first Congress (March 4, 1889 – March 3, 1891) but was an unsuccessful candidate for re - election in 1890 to the Fifty-second Congress.

== Later life and death ==
After leaving Congress, he resumed business activities and died near Salisbury, Connecticut in 1896. He was buried in Salisbury Cemetery.

U.S. House of Representatives
Preceded by Miles T. Granger	Member of the U.S. House of Representatives from Connecticut's 4th congressional district 1889 – 1891	Succeeded by Robert E. De Forest
Preceded by Levi Warner	Member of the U.S. House of Representatives from Connecticut's 4th congressional district 1879 – 1883	Succeeded by Edward Woodruff Seymour
Connecticut State Senate
Preceded by.	Member of the Connecticut Senate; 1877–1879	Succeeded by.
