= Robert E. De Forest =

American politician

Robert Elliott De Forest
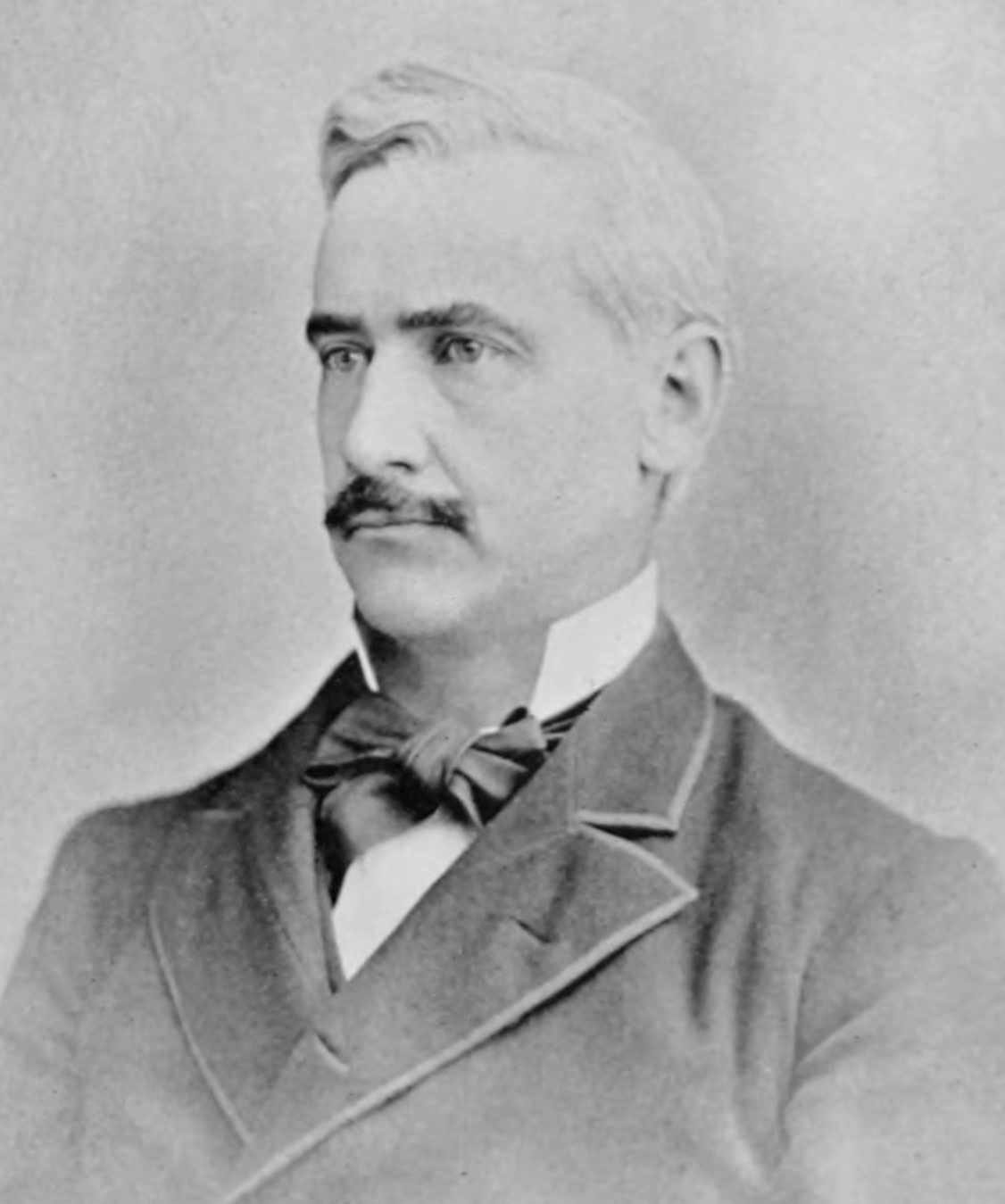

Member of the United States House of Representatives from Connecticut's 4th congressional district
- In office March 4, 1891 – March 3, 1895
- Preceded by: Frederick Miles
- Succeeded by: Ebenezer J. Hill

Mayor of Bridgeport, Connecticut
- In office 1878 – , 1889 –

Member of the Connecticut Senate
- In office 1882–

Member of the Connecticut House of Representatives
- In office 1880–

Personal details
- Born: February 20, 1845 Guilford, Connecticut, US
- Died: October 1, 1924 (aged 79) Bridgeport, Connecticut, US
- Resting place: Mountain Grove Cemetery
- Party: Democratic
- Education: Guilford Academy (1863); Yale College (1867)
- Occupation: lawyer

Robert Elliott De Forest (February 20, 1845 – October 1, 1924) was a Democratic member of the United States House of Representatives from Connecticut's 4th congressional district. He served as the mayor of Bridgeport, Connecticut in 1878, and again in 1889. He also served in the Connecticut Senate and Connecticut House of Representatives.

== Early life ==
He was born in Guilford, Connecticut and attended the common schools. He was graduated from Guilford Academy in 1863 and from Yale College in 1867. He moved to Royalton, Vermont, in 1867 and became an instructor in the Royalton Academy. He studied law. He was admitted to the bar in 1870 and commenced practice in Bridgeport, Connecticut.

== Political career ==
He served as prosecuting attorney for Bridgeport in 1872. He served as judge of the court of common pleas for Fairfield County in 1874-1877.

He served as mayor of Bridgeport in 1878.

He served as member of the State house of representatives in 1880.

He served in the State senate in 1882.

He was Corporation counsel for Bridgeport.

De Forest was again elected mayor in 1889 and 1890.

De Forest was elected to the Fifty-second and Fifty-third Congresses (March 4, 1891 – March 3, 1895). He served as chairman of the Committee on Reform in the Civil Service (Fifty-third Congress). He was an unsuccessful candidate for reelection in 1894 to the Fifty-fourth Congress.

He served two terms as judge of the common pleas court. He resumed the practice of law in Bridgeport, Connecticut, where he died October 1, 1924.

He was interred in Mountain Grove Cemetery.

U.S. House of Representatives
Preceded by Frederick Miles	Member of the U.S. House of Representatives from Connecticut's 4th congressional district 1891 – 1895	Succeeded by Ebenezer J. Hill
Political offices
Preceded by.	Mayor of Bridgeport, Connecticut; 1889	Succeeded by.
Connecticut State Senate
Preceded by.	Member of the Connecticut Senate; 1882	Succeeded by.
Connecticut House of Representatives
Preceded by.	Member of the Connecticut House of Representatives; 1880	Succeeded by.
Political offices
Preceded by.	Mayor of Bridgeport, Connecticut; 1878	Succeeded by.
