= Jim Marpe =

American politician

James S. Marpe

First Selectman of Westport, Connecticut
- In office November 18, 2013 – November 15, 2021
- Preceded by: Gordon Joseloff
- Succeeded by: Jennifer Tooker

Personal details
- Born: Ohio, United States
- Party: Connecticut Republican Party
- Education: Case Western Reserve University (BS); University of Pennsylvania (MBA)

Jim Marpe is an American businessman and politician, who served two terms as First Selectman of Westport, Connecticut from 2013 to 2021. A Republican, Marpe previously served on the Westport Public Schools Board of Education, included as acting chairman, and as an executive at Accenture.

Marpe oversaw an expansion of senior citizen services, restoration of parks and recreation facilities, and Westport's response to the COVID-19 pandemic.
