= Miles T. Granger =

American judge and politician (1817–1895)

Miles Tobey Granger
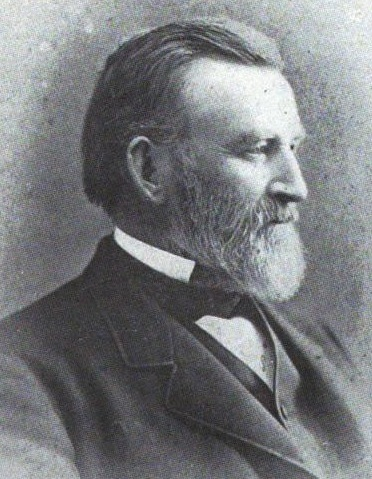

Member of the United States House of Representatives from Connecticut's 4th congressional district
- In office March 4, 1887 – March 3, 1889
- Preceded by: Edward Woodruff Seymour
- Succeeded by: Frederick Miles

Judge of the Connecticut Supreme Court of Errors
- In office 1876–1887
- Succeeded by: Sidney Burr Beardsley

Member of the Connecticut Senate
- In office 1866–

Member of the Connecticut House of Representatives
- In office 1857–

Personal details
- Born: August 12, 1817 New Marlborough, Massachusetts, U.S.
- Died: October 21, 1895 (aged 78) North Canaan, Connecticut, U.S.
- Resting place: Lower Cemetery
- Party: Democratic
- Spouse: Sarah C. Ferguson
- Children: Bertha, Samuel, Mary, Josie, Kittie, Carrie
- Education: Wesleyan University (1842)
- Occupation: Lawyer, judge

Miles Tobey Granger (August 12, 1817 – October 21, 1895) was a judge of the Supreme Court of Errors (now called the Connecticut Supreme Court) in 1876 and served until March 1, 1887, when he resigned. He was a Democratic member of the United States House of Representatives from Connecticut's 4th congressional district from 1887 to 1889. He served as member of the Connecticut House of Representatives in 1857, and in the Connecticut Senate in 1866 and 1867.

== Early life ==
Granger was born in New Marlboro, Massachusetts, Granger moved with his parents to Canaan, Connecticut, in 1819. He pursued common-school and academic studies, and graduated from Wesleyan University, Middletown, Connecticut, in 1842, and there became a member of the Mystical Seven.

He moved to Louisiana in 1843 where he taught for a private family in West Feliciana Parish, and he was admitted to the bar of Wilkinson County, Mississippi, in April 1845.

He returned to Canaan, Connecticut, and was admitted to the bar in Litchfield County in October 1845 and practiced law in Canaan 1847-1867. After 1849, he was a Probate Judge, District of Canaan for fifteen of eighteen years.

On October 21, 1846, he married Miss Sarah C. Ferguson of Sheffield, Massachusetts. They had six children, Bertha I., Samuel F., Mary F., Josie, Kittie M., Carrie Tobey.

Granger served as member of the Connecticut House of Representatives in 1857, and in the Connecticut Senate in 1866 and 1867.

From 1867 to 1876, he was a judge of the Superior Court of Connecticut, and Granger was elected judge of the Supreme Court of Errors (now the Supreme Court of Connecticut) in 1876 and served until March 1, 1887, when he resigned.

Granger was elected to the Fiftieth Congress (March 4, 1887 – March 3, 1889). He was not a candidate for renomination in 1888.

Granger was elected State referee in 1893 and served until his death in North Canaan, Connecticut, October 21, 1895, where he was interred in the Lower Cemetery.

U.S. House of Representatives
Preceded by Edward Woodruff Seymour	Member of the U.S. House of Representatives from Connecticut's 4th congressional district 1887 – 1889	Succeeded by Frederick Miles
Political offices
Preceded by.	Member of the Connecticut Supreme Court; 1876 – March 1, 1887	Succeeded by.
Preceded by.	Member of the Connecticut Senate; 1866	Succeeded by.
Preceded by.	Member of the Connecticut House of Representatives; 1857	Succeeded by.
