= Edward W. Seymour =

American judge (1832–1892)

Edward Woodruff Seymour
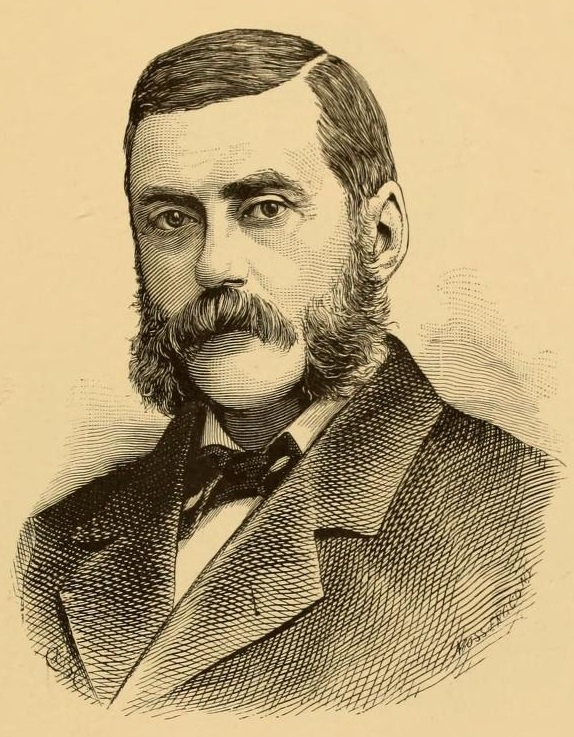
- From 1888's Evening Post Annual.

Justice of the Connecticut Supreme Court
- In office 1889–1892
- Preceded by: Sidney Burr Beardsley
- Succeeded by: Simeon E. Baldwin

Member of the United States House of Representatives from Connecticut's 4th congressional district
- In office March 4, 1883 – March 3, 1887
- Preceded by: Frederick Miles
- Succeeded by: Miles T. Granger

Member of the Connecticut Senate
- In office 1876–

Member of the Connecticut House of Representatives
- In office 1859–1860
- In office 1870–1871

Personal details
- Born: August 30, 1832 Litchfield, Connecticut
- Died: October 16, 1892 (aged 60) Litchfield, Connecticut
- Resting place: East Cemetery
- Party: Democratic
- Education: Yale College (1853)
- Occupation: lawyer

Edward Woodruff Seymour (August 30, 1832 – October 16, 1892) was a Democratic member of the United States House of Representatives from Connecticut, son of Origen Storrs Seymour, great-nephew of Horatio Seymour.

Born in Litchfield, Connecticut, Seymour attended the public schools and was graduated from Yale College in 1853. He studied law. He was admitted to the bar in 1856 and practiced in Litchfield and Bridgeport, Connecticut.

He served as member of the State house of representatives from 1859 to 1860, and from 1870 to 1871. He served in the State senate in 1876.

Seymour was elected as a Democrat to the Forty-eighth and Forty-ninth Congresses (March 4, 1883 – March 3, 1887). He resumed the practice of his profession.

He was appointed as a judge of the Connecticut Supreme Court in 1889.

He died in Litchfield, Connecticut, on October 16, 1892. He was interred in East Cemetery.

== See also ==
- Seymour-Conkling family

U.S. House of Representatives
Preceded by Frederick Miles	Member of the U.S. House of Representatives from Connecticut's 4th congressional district 1883 – 1887	Succeeded by Miles T. Granger
