= 2006 United States House of Representatives elections in Connecticut =

- November 7, 2006

All 5 Connecticut seats to the United States House of Representatives
| | Majority party | Minority party |
|---|---|---|
| Party | Democratic | Republican |
| Last election | 2 | 3 |
| Seats won | 4 | 1 |
| Seat change | ▲2 | ▼2 |
| Popular vote | 648,655 | 419,895 |
| Percentage | 60.35% | 39.07% |
| Swing | ▲5.35% | ▼5.02% |

Democratic
50–60%
60–70%
70–80%
80–90%
90–100%
Republican
40–50%
50–60%
60–70%

The 2006 United States House of Representatives elections in Connecticut were held on November 7, 2006, to elect the five members of the U.S. House, one from each of the state's congressional districts, to represent Connecticut in the 110th Congress. The elections coincided with a state gubernatorial election and a U.S. Senate election, as well as congressional elections in other states.

Four Democrats and one Republican were elected in these elections; two of the Democratic victories resulted from the defeats of incumbent Republicans. The Representatives elected in these elections served in Congress from January 3, 2007, until January 3, 2009. As of 2026, this is the last election in which a Republican won a congressional district in Connecticut.

== Overview ==
United States House of Representatives elections in Connecticut, 2006
| Party | Votes | Percentage | Seats | +/– |
|---|---|---|---|---|
| Democratic † | 648,655 | 60.35% | 4 | +2 |
| Republican | 419,895 | 39.07% | 1 | –2 |
| Green | 3,090 | 0.29% | 0 | 0 |
| Libertarian | 3,058 | 0.28% | 0 | 0 |
| Write-in candidates | 43 | <0.01% | 0 | 0 |
| Totals | 1,074,741 | 100.00% | 5 | — |

† Includes 5,794 votes received on the line of the Connecticut Working Families Party, which cross-endorsed the Democratic candidate in the Fifth District, Chris Murphy.

== District 1 ==
2006 Connecticut's 1st congressional district election
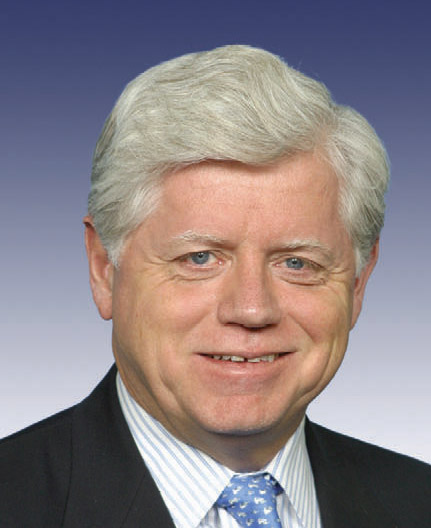

| Nominee | John B. Larson | Scott MacLean |
| Party | Democratic | Republican |
| Popular vote | 154,539 | 53,010 |
| Percentage | 74.4% | 25.5% |
- Municipality results Larson: 50–60% 60–70% 70–80% 80–90% >90%
U.S. Representative before election
John B. Larson
Democratic
Elected U.S. Representative
John B. Larson
Democratic

Incumbent Democrat John B. Larson faced Republican challenger Scott MacLean in the election; Larson was re-elected with 74.44 percent of the vote.

=== Predictions ===
| Source | Ranking | As of |
|---|---|---|
| The Cook Political Report | Safe D | November 6, 2006 |
| Rothenberg | Safe D | November 6, 2006 |
| Sabato's Crystal Ball | Safe D | November 6, 2006 |
| Real Clear Politics | Safe D | November 7, 2006 |
| CQ Politics | Safe D | November 7, 2006 |

Results

Connecticut's First Congressional District election, 2006
| Party | Candidate | Votes | % |
|---|---|---|---|
| Democratic | John B. Larson (incumbent) | 154,539 | 74.44 |
| Republican | Scott MacLean | 53,010 | 25.54 |
| Write-In | Stephen Fournier | 43 | 0.02 |
| Total votes | | 207,592 | 100 |
| Democratic hold | | | |

== District 2 ==
2006 Connecticut's 2nd congressional district election
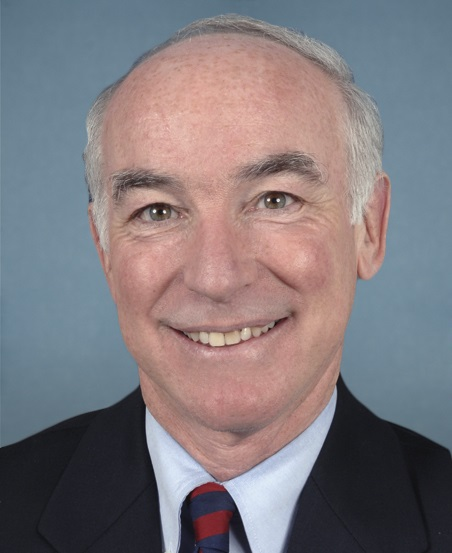

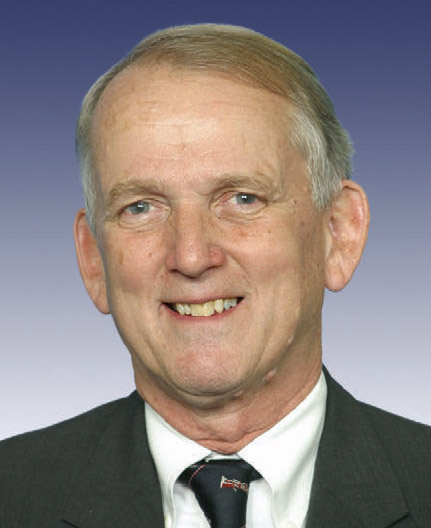
| Nominee | Joe Courtney | Rob Simmons |
| Party | Democratic | Republican |
| Popular vote | 121,248 | 121,165 |
| Percentage | 50.02% | 49.98% |
- Municipality results Courtney: 50–60% 60–70% 70–80% Simmons: 50–60% 60–70%
U.S. Representative before election
Rob Simmons
Republican
Elected U.S. Representative
Joe Courtney
Democratic

Incumbent Republican Rob Simmons faced Democratic challenger Joe Courtney in the election in a rematch of their 2002 race; Courtney narrowly defeated Simmons by only 83 votes. This was the closest House race in 2006.

=== Predictions ===
| Source | Ranking | As of |
|---|---|---|
| The Cook Political Report | Tossup | November 6, 2006 |
| Rothenberg | Tossup | November 6, 2006 |
| Sabato's Crystal Ball | Tilt D (flip) | November 6, 2006 |
| Real Clear Politics | Lean R | November 7, 2006 |
| CQ Politics | Lean R | November 7, 2006 |

Results

Connecticut's Second Congressional District election, 2006
| Party | Candidate | Votes | % |
|---|---|---|---|
| Democratic | Joe Courtney | 121,248 | 50.017 |
| Republican | Rob Simmons (incumbent) | 121,165 | 49.983 |
| Total votes | | 242,413 | 100 |
| Democratic gain from Republican | | | |

== District 3 ==
2006 Connecticut's 3rd congressional district election
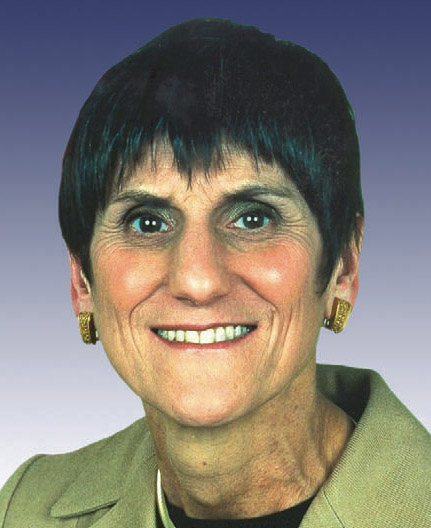

| Nominee | Rosa DeLauro | Joseph Vollano |
| Party | Democratic | Republican |
| Popular vote | 150,436 | 44,386 |
| Percentage | 76.0% | 22.4% |
- Municipality results DeLauro: 60–70% 70–80% 80–90%
U.S. Representative before election
Rosa DeLauro
Democratic
Elected U.S. Representative
Rosa DeLauro
Democratic

Incumbent Democrat Rosa L. DeLauro faced Republican challenger Joseph Vollano in the election; DeLauro was re-elected with 76 percent of the vote.

=== Predictions ===
| Source | Ranking | As of |
|---|---|---|
| The Cook Political Report | Safe D | November 6, 2006 |
| Rothenberg | Safe D | November 6, 2006 |
| Sabato's Crystal Ball | Safe D | November 6, 2006 |
| Real Clear Politics | Safe D | November 7, 2006 |
| CQ Politics | Safe D | November 7, 2006 |

Results

Connecticut's Third Congressional District election, 2006
| Party | Candidate | Votes | % |
|---|---|---|---|
| Democratic | Rosa L. DeLauro (incumbent) | 150,436 | 76.01 |
| Republican | Joseph Vollano | 44,386 | 22.43 |
| Green | Daniel G. Sumrall | 3,089 | 1.56 |
| Total votes | | 197,911 | 100 |
| Democratic hold | | | |

== District 4 ==
2006 Connecticut's 4th congressional district election
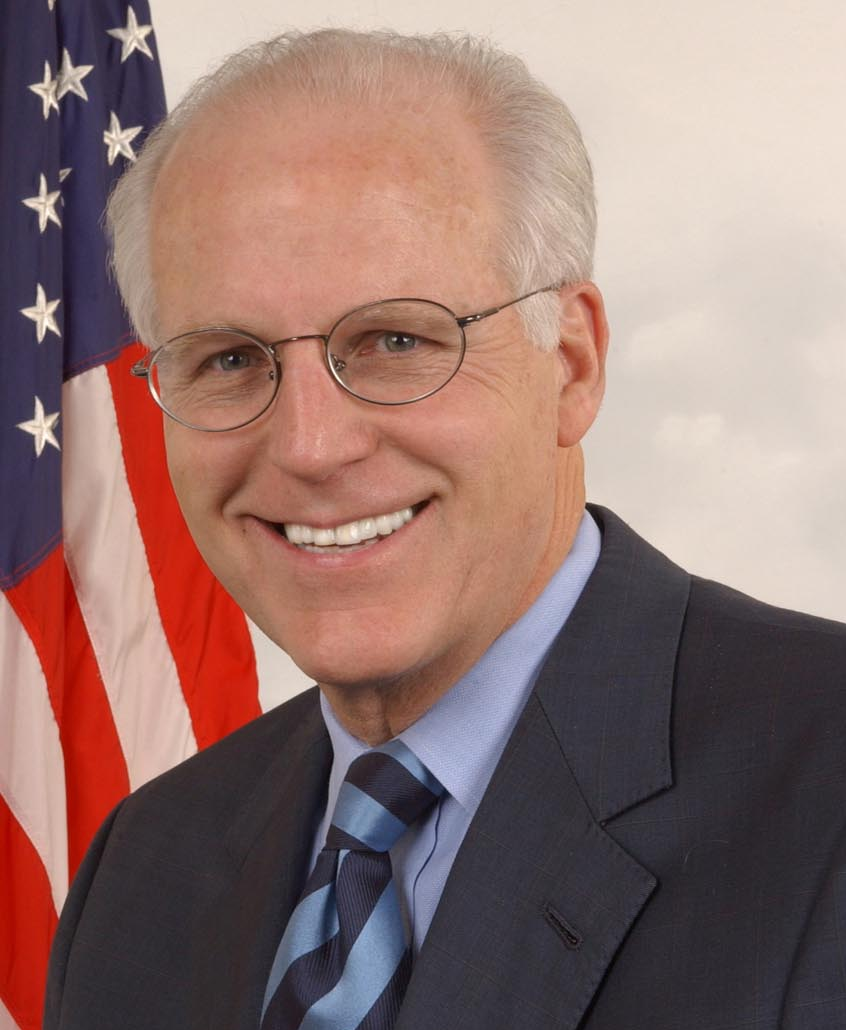

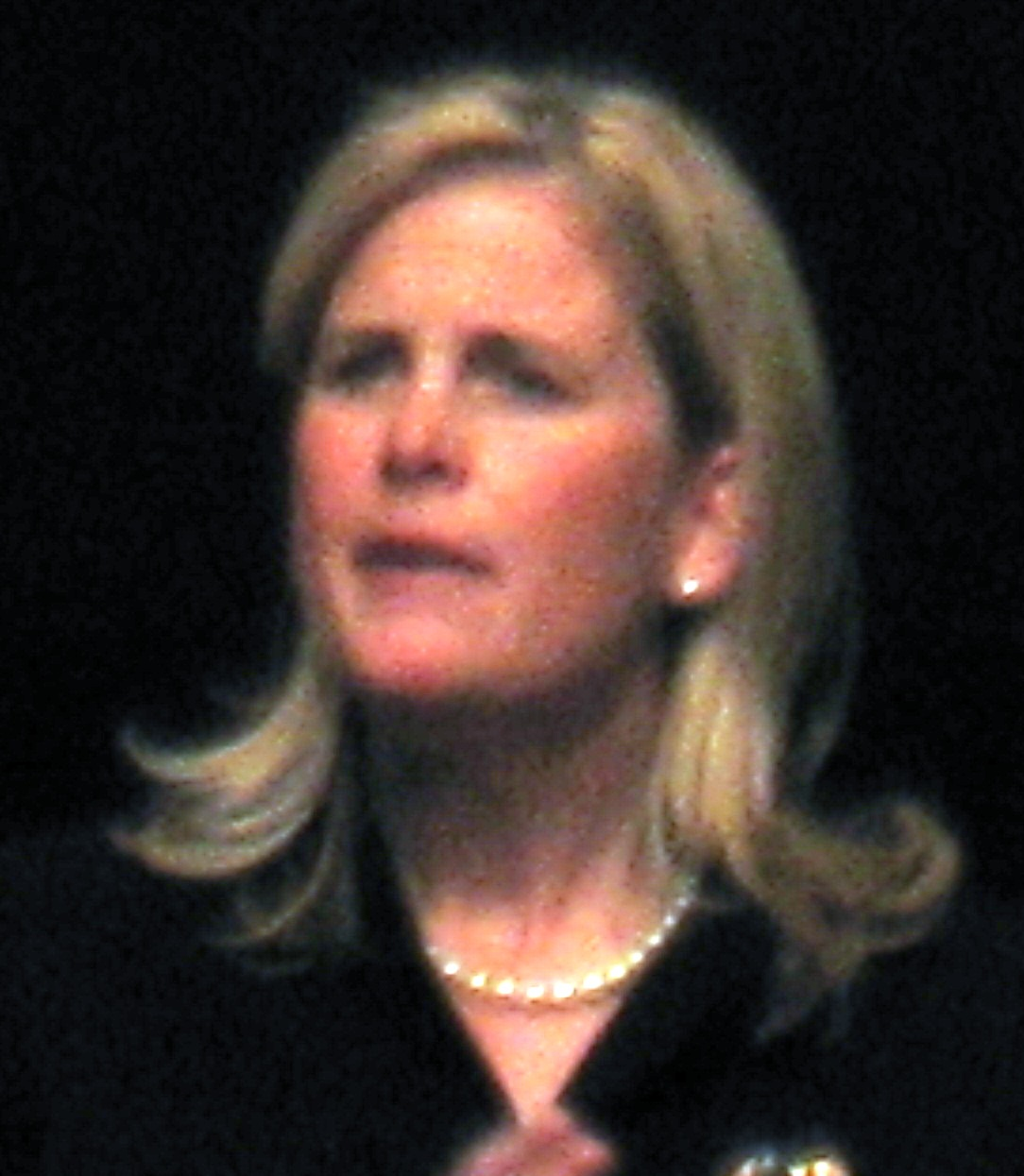
| Nominee | Chris Shays | Diane Farrell |
| Party | Republican | Democratic |
| Popular vote | 106,510 | 99,450 |
| Percentage | 51.0% | 47.6% |
- Municipality results Shays: 40–50% 50–60% 60–70% Farrell: 50–60% 60–70%
U.S. Representative before election
Chris Shays
Republican
Elected U.S. Representative
Chris Shays
Republican

Incumbent Republican Christopher Shays faced Democratic challenger Diane Farrell in the election; Shays was re-elected with 50.96 percent of the vote.

=== Endorsements ===
Diane Farrell (D)

Individuals

- Wesley Clark, general, 2004 Democratic presidential candidate

==== Predictions ====
| Source | Ranking | As of |
|---|---|---|
| The Cook Political Report | Tossup | November 6, 2006 |
| Rothenberg | Tossup | November 6, 2006 |
| Sabato's Crystal Ball | Tilt D (flip) | November 6, 2006 |
| Real Clear Politics | Tossup | November 7, 2006 |
| CQ Politics | Tossup | November 7, 2006 |

Results

Connecticut's Fourth Congressional District election, 2006
| Party | Candidate | Votes | % |
|---|---|---|---|
| Republican | Christopher Shays (incumbent) | 106,510 | 50.96 |
| Democratic | Diane Farrell | 99,450 | 47.58 |
| Libertarian | Phil Maymin | 3,058 | 1.46 |
| Green | Vacancy in nomination | 1 | 0.00 |
| Total votes | | 209,019 | 100 |
| Republican hold | | | |

== District 5 ==
2006 Connecticut's 5th congressional district election
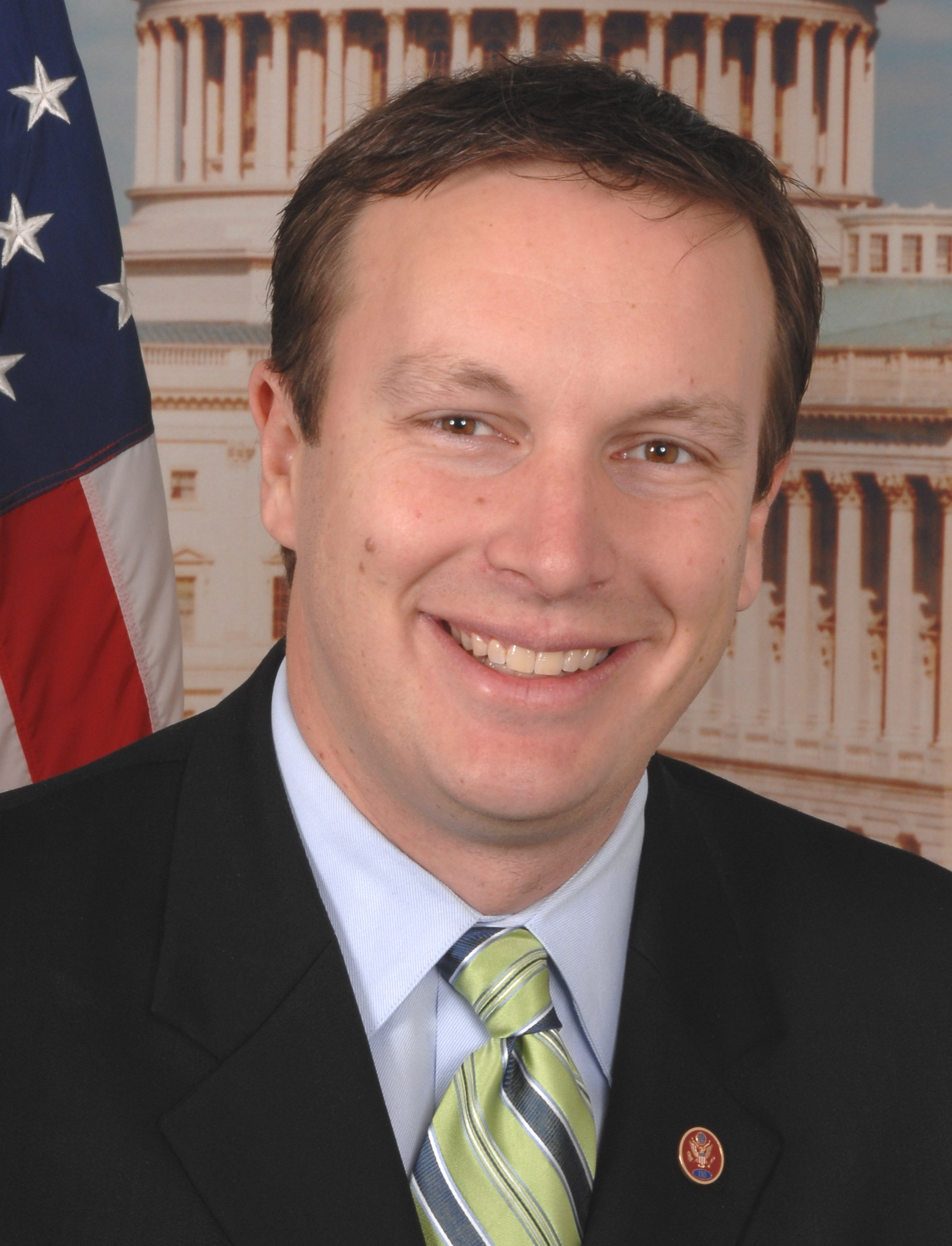

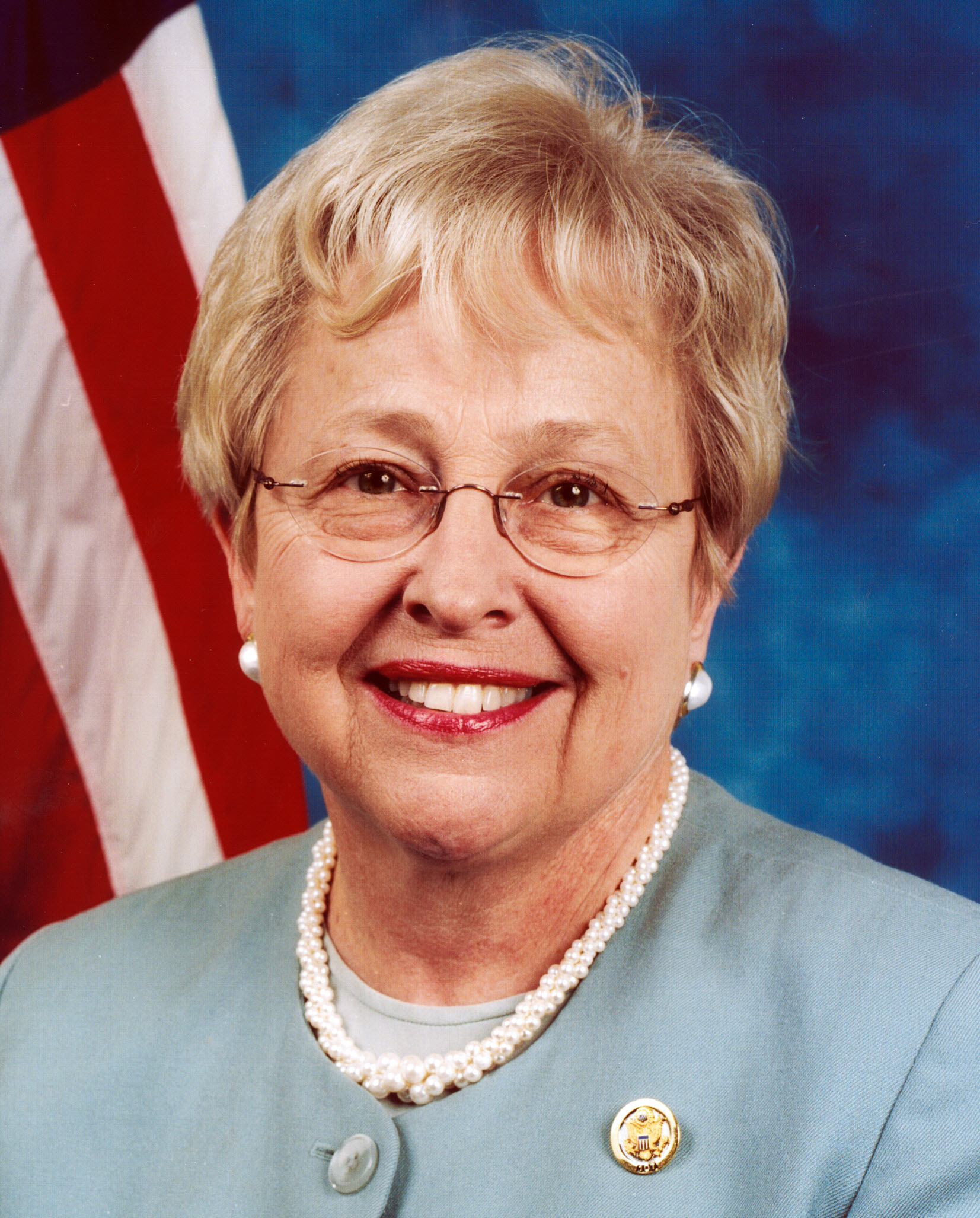
| Nominee | Chris Murphy | Nancy L. Johnson |
| Party | Democratic | Republican |
| Alliance | Working Families |
| Popular vote | 122,980 | 94,824 |
| Percentage | 56.5% | 43.5% |
- Municipality results Murphy: 50–60% 60–70% 70–80% Johnson: 50–60%
U.S. Representative before election
Nancy L. Johnson
Republican
Elected U.S. Representative
Chris Murphy
Democratic

Incumbent Republican Nancy L. Johnson faced Democratic challenger Chris Murphy in the election; Murphy defeated the incumbent with 56.46 percent of the vote.

=== Endorsements ===
Chris Murphy (D)

Individuals

- Wesley Clark, general, 2004 Democratic presidential candidate

Debates
Link to Debate Complete Video of Debate - October 14, 2006

==== Predictions ====
| Source | Ranking | As of |
|---|---|---|
| The Cook Political Report | Tossup | November 6, 2006 |
| Rothenberg | Tilt D (flip) | November 6, 2006 |
| Sabato's Crystal Ball | Tilt D (flip) | November 6, 2006 |
| Real Clear Politics | Tossup | November 7, 2006 |
| CQ Politics | Tossup | November 7, 2006 |

Results

Connecticut's Fifth Congressional District election, 2006
| Party | Candidate | Votes | % |
|---|---|---|---|
| Democratic | Chris Murphy | 122,980^{WF} | 56.46 |
| Republican | Nancy L. Johnson (incumbent) | 94,824 | 43.54 |
| Total votes | | 217,804 | 100 |
| Democratic gain from Republican | | | |

^{WF} Murphy also ran on the line of the Connecticut Working Families Party in the election, and received 5,794 of his votes on it. His Democratic and Working Families totals have been aggregated to reach 122,980.
