= Levi Warner =

American politician (1831–1911)

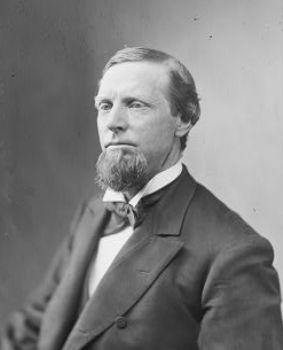

Member of the United States House of Representatives from Connecticut's 4th congressional district
- In office December 4, 1876 – March 3, 1879
- Preceded by: William Henry Barnum
- Succeeded by: Frederick Miles

Personal details
- Born: October 10, 1831 Wethersfield, Connecticut, US
- Died: April 12, 1911 (aged 79) Norwalk, Connecticut, US
- Resting place: Riverside Cemetery
- Party: Democratic
- Education: Yale College; Dane Law School
- Occupation: lawyer

Levi Warner (October 10, 1831 – April 12, 1911) was a Democratic member of the United States House of Representatives from Connecticut's 4th congressional district from 1876 to 1879.

== Early life and family ==
His brother was Samuel Larkin Warner who was also a United States Representative from Connecticut. He was born in Wethersfield, Connecticut where he completed preparatory studies. Later, he attended the law department of Yale College and Dane Law School, Cambridge, Massachusetts. He was admitted to the bar in 1859 and commenced practice in Fairfield County, Connecticut before moving to Norwalk, Connecticut in 1858 and continuing the practice of law.

== Political career ==
Warner was elected to the Forty-fourth Congress to fill the vacancy caused by the resignation of William H. Barnum. He was reelected to the Forty-fifth Congress and served from December 4, 1876, to March 3, 1879. He was not a candidate for renomination in 1878. After leaving Congress, he resumed the practice of law. He died in Norwalk, Connecticut in 1911 and was buried in Riverside Cemetery.

U.S. House of Representatives
Preceded by William Henry Barnum	Member of the U.S. House of Representatives from Connecticut's 4th congressional district December 4, 1876 – March 3, 1879	Succeeded by Frederick Miles
