= Diane Farrell =

American politician

Diane G. Farrell
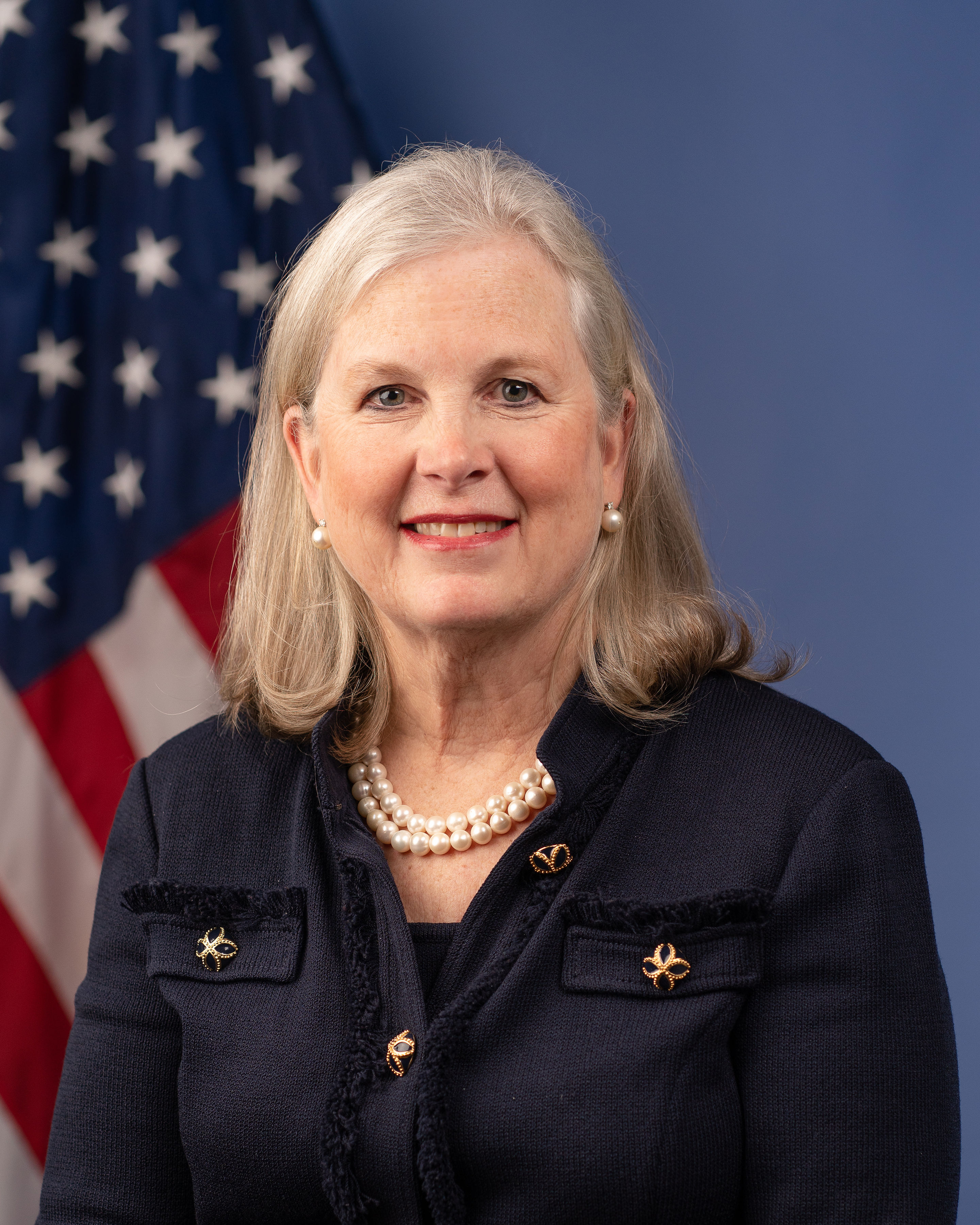

First Selectwoman of Westport, Connecticut
- In office 1997–2005
- Preceded by: Joseph Arcudi
- Succeeded by: Gordon Joseloff

Personal details
- Born: August 10, 1955 (age 71) New Rochelle, New York
- Party: Democratic
- Spouse: Winslow Farrell Jr.
- Website: Farrell for Congress

Diane Catherine Goss Farrell (born August 10, 1955) currently serves as the Acting Deputy Under Secretary for International Trade in Washington, D.C. In this role, she oversees the daily operations of the International Trade Administration (ITA), which has an annual budget of $483 million with approximately 2,100 trade and investment professionals—based in more than 100 U.S. cities and 70 markets around the world. Farrell is a former Democratic candidate for Connecticut's 4th congressional district in 2004 and 2006.

She was appointed by President George W. Bush to become a member of the board of directors of the Export-Import Bank of the United States and confirmed by the United States Senate on August 1, 2007, for a term ending on January 20, 2011.

Farrell is a former elementary school teacher who later worked in the advertising industry and first became engaged in school politics when her children entered the public schools in Westport, Connecticut. Prior to running for elective office, she attended the Women's Campaign School at Yale University.

== Personal life ==
A native of New Rochelle, New York, she was three years old when her family moved to Westport in 1958. She graduated from Massachusetts' Wheaton College with a major in American Government and a minor in elementary education in 1977. In 1978, she married Karr Winslow Farrell Jr. They have two daughters, Hilary (born 1983) and Margaret (born 1986).

== Political career ==
Diane Farrell served two terms as Westport's First Selectwoman, a position equivalent to that of Mayor. She was first elected in 1997 with 59% of the vote and was reelected, with 70% of the vote, in 2001. Farrell's campaign website says she was elected to office on both occasions with the support not only of her fellow Democrats, but also a significant group of independents and Republicans. A strong mayor form of government, she managed multi-million dollar budgets within the Consumer Price Index and maintained the town’s AAA bond rating at a time when significant infrastructure investment was taking place. She oversaw the construction of schools, a municipal waste water treatment plant, affordable housing, and other necessary facilities.

In 2002, she was elected chair of Fairfield County's South Western Regional Metropolitan Planning Organization, which is responsible for managing development and sprawl. As a select member of the National League of Cities Transportation and Infrastructure Steering and Policy Committee, she helped set policy goals for transportation and infrastructure initiatives in support of cities and towns across the United States.

Next, Farrell served on the Board of Directors at the Export Import Bank of the United States (U.S. Exim Bank). A Presidential appointee, confirmed by the U.S. Senate, she was responsible for voting on the transactions in excess of $10 million as well as on significant policy matters. Her portfolio responsibilities included small business, India, Southeast Asia, and portions of Latin America. In addition, she was named a member of the White House Business Council. During her tenure at U.S. Exim Bank, India transactions expanded and diversified as aircraft sales and conventional and green energy projects, among others, led to India becoming the second largest country by U.S. dollar allocation in the bank’s overall portfolio.

Following her tenure at U.S. Exim Bank, Farrell worked at the U.S. India Business Council (USIBC). As Executive Vice President, she oversaw business advocacy policy and government relations.

She most recently served as the Deputy Assistant Secretary for Asia, where she was the principal advisor to the Assistant Secretary for Global Markets on all matters concerning international economics, trade, investment, and commercial policy programs and agreements with respect to Asia. In this role, she also oversaw planning and execution of Commerce commercial diplomacy and export promotion strategies at United States Missions in Region Asia.

== Congressional campaigns ==
=== 2004 ===
Farrell announced that she would challenge 17-year incumbent Republican Christopher Shays for the representation of Connecticut's fourth congressional district. She lost the seat by about four percent. However, she was widely regarded as having made considerable progress, as she won towns beside traditionally Democratic blue-collar Bridgeport. She won her home town of Westport, as well as Stamford and Norwalk, but was narrowly defeated in several others. Farrell decided against running again for the post of First Selectwoman of the Town of Westport, and filed papers with the Federal Election Commission to raise funds for a 2006 congressional run.

=== 2006 ===
On November 7, 2006, incumbent Representative Christopher Shays defeated Diane Farrell by a margin of approximately 3%. The final tally was 106,558 (51%) for Shays, 99,993 (48%) for Farrell. This was comparable to the result in 2004, when Farrell also received 48% of the vote.

Connecticut 4th congressional district election, 2006: Connecticut District 4
Party	Candidate	Votes	%	±%
Republican	Christopher Shays (incumbent)	106,510	51%	
Democratic	Diane Farrell	99,450	48%	
Libertarian	Phil Maymin	3,058	1%	
Republican hold		Swing		
Turnout		209,018	100%	

== See also ==
- List of United States political appointments that crossed party lines
