= Gordon Joseloff =

American politician and journalist (1945–2020)

Gordon F. Joseloff

First Selectman of Westport, Connecticut
- In office 2005–2013
- Preceded by: Diane G. Farrell
- Succeeded by: Jim Marpe

Personal details
- Born: May 13, 1945 New York, New York, U.S.
- Died: November 9, 2020 (aged 75) Westport, Connecticut, U.S.
- Party: Democratic Party of Connecticut
- Education: McBurney School; Syracuse University
- Awards: Emmy Award

Gordon F. Joseloff (May 13, 1945 – November 9, 2020) was an American Emmy Award-winning journalist and First Selectman of Westport, Connecticut. A former foreign correspondent for CBS News in New York, Tokyo, and Moscow, and United Press International, he was also the founding editor and publisher of WestportNow, a local news and information website he established in 2003.

Joseloff was elected as First Selectman of Westport in 2005 with almost 60 percent of the vote and re-elected in 2009 with almost 52 percent. He earlier served 14 years on the Westport Representative Town Meeting (RTM), the town's legislative body, including 10 as its moderator, or president.
