= Sidney Burr Beardsley =

American judge (1823–1890)

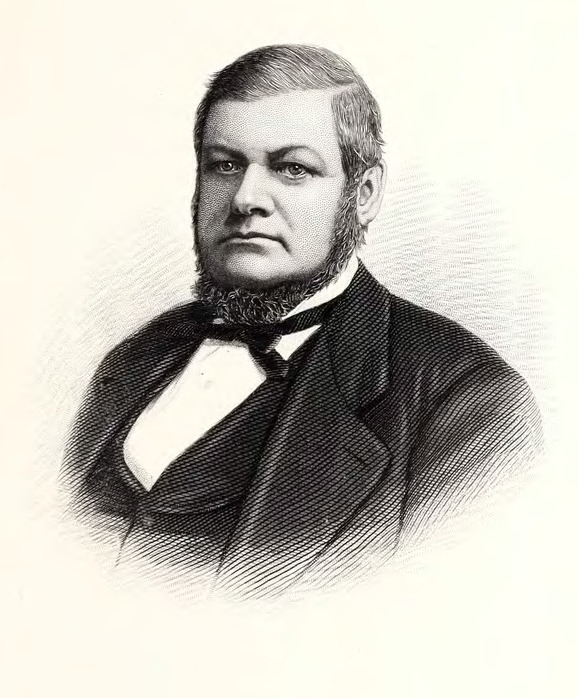
- Born: 20 August 1822; Monroe
- Died: 21 April 1890; Bridgeport

Sidney Burr Beardsley (August 20, 1822 – April 21, 1890) was a justice of the Connecticut Supreme Court from 1887 to 1889.

== Education and career ==
Born in Monroe, Connecticut, his father Cyrus H. Beardsley was speaker of the Connecticut House of Representatives in 1856, and for several years a judge of the County Court of Fairfield County. Beardsley prepared for college and entered Yale College, but did not graduate, afterwards receiving an honorary degree, studied law, and was admitted to the bar of Fairfield County in 1843. He began the practice of law in Norwalk, but soon after moved to Bridgeport, where he resided until his death. He "acquired a prominent position in his profession, and a large and lucrative practice". He was elected to the Connecticut State Senate in 1858, and was induced to run for Congress in 1869 on the Republican ticket against William Henry Barnum, afterwards United States Senator. Beardsley carried his city of Bridgeport and most of the towns of his county, but was defeated upon the whole vote.

== Judicial service ==
In 1874, Beardsley accepted a seat on the bench of the Superior Court, proffered with the support of state senator Nathan Wheeler. On February 15, 1887, Governor Phineas C. Lounsbury nominated Beardsley to a seat on the state supreme court vacated by the retirement of Justice Miles T. Granger, after Judge Edward I. Sanford of New Haven declined the appointment. Beardsley resigned from the bench in June 1889, effective November 1, 1889, due to poor health; he was succeeded by Edward Woodruff Seymour.

== Personal life and death ==
He married Ann Eliza Daskam of Norwalk, with whom he had a son and two daughters. Beardsley died at Bridgeport where he had resided most of his professional life at age 67.

Political offices
| Preceded by Miles T. Granger | Justice of the Connecticut Supreme Court; 1887–1889 | Succeeded by Edward Woodruff Seymour |
