= 2008 Connecticut Democratic presidential primary =

- February 5, 2008

60 delegates to the Democratic National Convention (48 pledged, 12 unpledged) The number of pledged delegates received is determined by the popular vote

Candidate	Barack Obama	Hillary Clinton
Home state	Illinois	New York
Delegate count	26	22
Popular vote	179,742	165,426
Percentage	50.70%	46.66%
- County results Clinton: 40–50% 50–60% Obama: 50–60%

The 2008 Connecticut Democratic presidential primary took place on Super Tuesday, February 5, 2008, with 48 delegates at stake. The winner in each of Connecticut's five congressional districts was awarded all of that district's delegates, totaling 31. Another 17 delegates were awarded to the statewide winner, Barack Obama. The 48 delegates represented Connecticut at the Democratic National Convention in Denver, Colorado. Twelve other unpledged delegates, known as superdelegates, also attended the convention and cast their votes as well.

Connecticut held a closed primary, meaning only registered Democrats could vote.

== Campaign ==
The Connecticut Legislature voted to move Connecticut's presidential primaries to February 5 in order to increase the state's stature in the presidential nominating process, as many other states also did for the primaries of both parties. Largely due to a close Democratic race, the legislature's dream came true, as both Hillary Clinton and Barack Obama devoted much attention in the state through television advertising, and even campaigned in the state the day before the primary:

- Clinton campaigned in New Haven, conducting a round-table discussion at Yale University. She had campaigned in Hartford one week earlier.
- Barack Obama held a large rally at the XL Center (formerly the Hartford Civic Center) in Hartford, attracting over 16,000 people.

Going into Super Tuesday, the state was viewed as a toss-up and was seen as an important bellwether for the overall race on Super Tuesday. The predictions were right as the results gave Obama a narrow victory over Clinton; the second-closest race on Super Tuesday (only in Missouri was the race closer). Connecticut was considered an upset by the media and the Clinton campaign due to Connecticut's close proximity to Clinton's home state of New York.

== Polling ==
Up until late January 2008, New York Senator Hillary Clinton seemed clearly favored to win the Connecticut primary, taking a wide lead over her second closest rival, Illinois Senator Barack Obama, in every poll. However, a poll on January 27, 2008, showed a tie between Clinton and Obama. After that, polls showed a close race. Clinton took a 13-point lead over Obama in one poll, but Obama led by 2 and 4 in 2 more polls. The final poll showed Obama leading Clinton with 48% to 46%.

== Results ==
The turnout of almost 355,000 voters shattered the previous record for a primary election in the state, even topping the bitterly contested 2006 Connecticut Democratic U.S. Senate Primary between Joe Lieberman and Ned Lamont.

2008 Connecticut Democratic Presidential Primary Results
Party	Candidate	Votes	Percentage	Delegates
Democratic	Barack Obama	179,742	50.70%	26
Democratic	Hillary Clinton	165,426	46.66%	22
Democratic	John Edwards	3,424	0.97%	0
Democratic	Uncommitted	3,038	0.86%	0
Democratic	Christopher Dodd	912	0.26%	0
Democratic	Dennis Kucinich	846	0.24%	0
Democratic	Joe Biden	440	0.12%	0
Democratic	Bill Richardson	436	0.12%	0
Democratic	Mike Gravel	275	0.08%	0
Totals		354,539	100.00%	48
Voter turnout		%		—

== Analysis ==
Barack Obama's narrow win in the Connecticut Democratic Primary can be traced to a number of factors. According to the exit polls, 82 percent of voters in the Connecticut Democratic Primary were Caucasian and they narrowly favored Clinton by a margin of 49-48 compared to the 9 percent of African American voters who backed Obama by a margin of 74-24 and the 6 percent of Hispanic/Latino voters who also backed Obama by a margin of 53–43. Obama won all age groups except senior citizens ages 65 and over who narrowly backed Clinton by a margin of 50–47. Obama also won more affluent voters making over $50,000 while Clinton won less affluent voters making less than $50,000. Obama also won higher-educated voters (college graduates 57–42; postgraduate studies 58–41) while less-educated voters backed Clinton (some college or associate degree 53–43; high school graduates 55–41). While registered Democrats narrowly favored Clinton 50–48, Independents largely favored Obama by a margin of 62–32; he also won all ideological groups. Pertaining to religion, Obama won all major denominations except Roman Catholics who backed Clinton with a 59–39 margin – Obama won Protestants 61–36, other Christians 63–33, Jews 61–38, other religions 65–32, and atheists/agnostics 52–47.

While all counties in Connecticut were extremely close, Obama won six of the state's eight counties – Clinton won New London and Windham counties in Eastern Connecticut.

2008 Connecticut Democratic presidential primary
Demographic subgroup	Obama	Clinton	% of total vote
Total vote	51	47	100
Sex
Male	59	39	41
Female	45	53	59
Candidate quality that matters most
Can bring about needed change	71	27	52
Cares about people like me	59	37	11
Has the right experience	5	93	25

== See also ==
- 2008 Connecticut Republican presidential primary
- 2008 Democratic Party presidential primaries
