= 2008 Connecticut Republican presidential primary =

- February 5, 2008
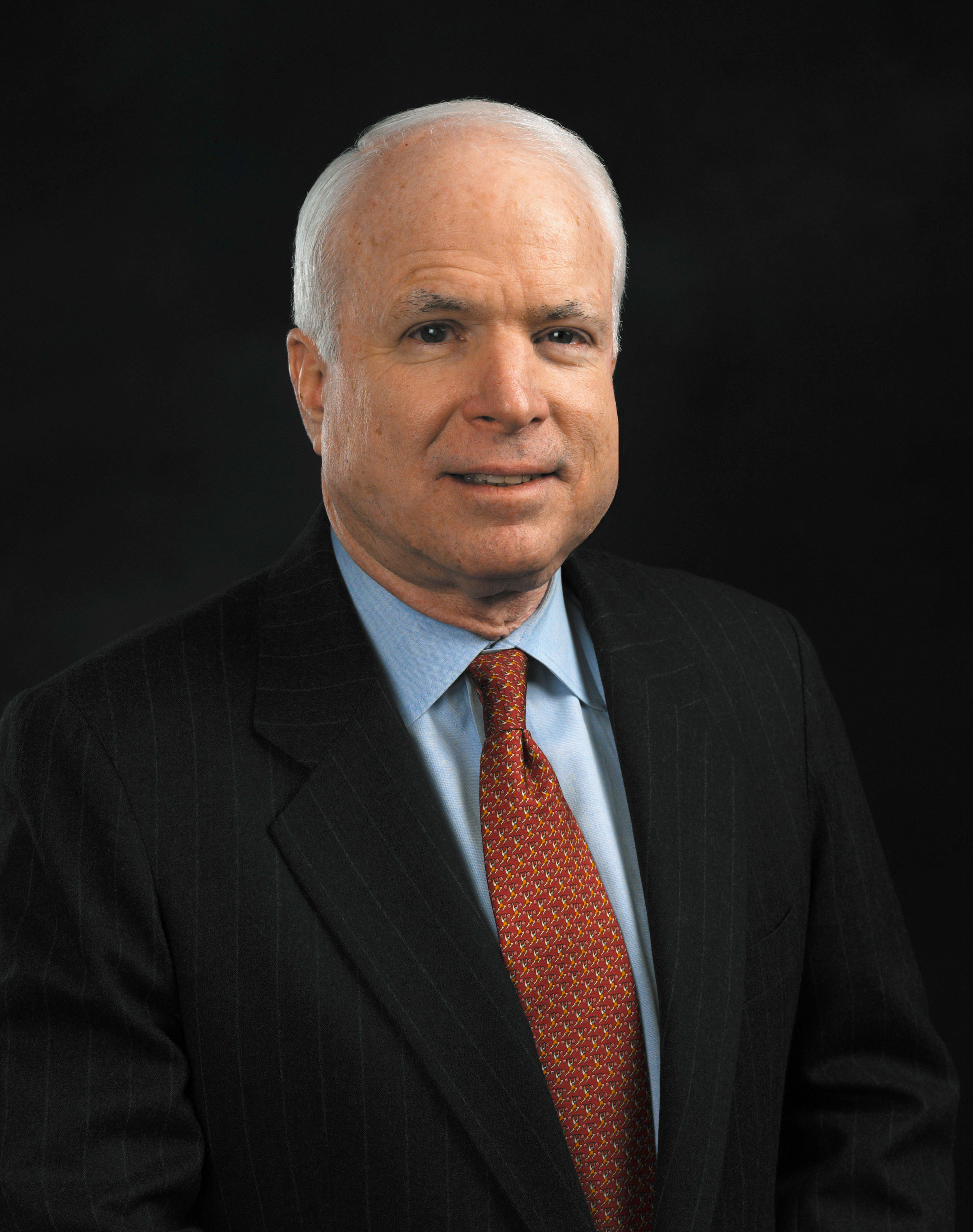

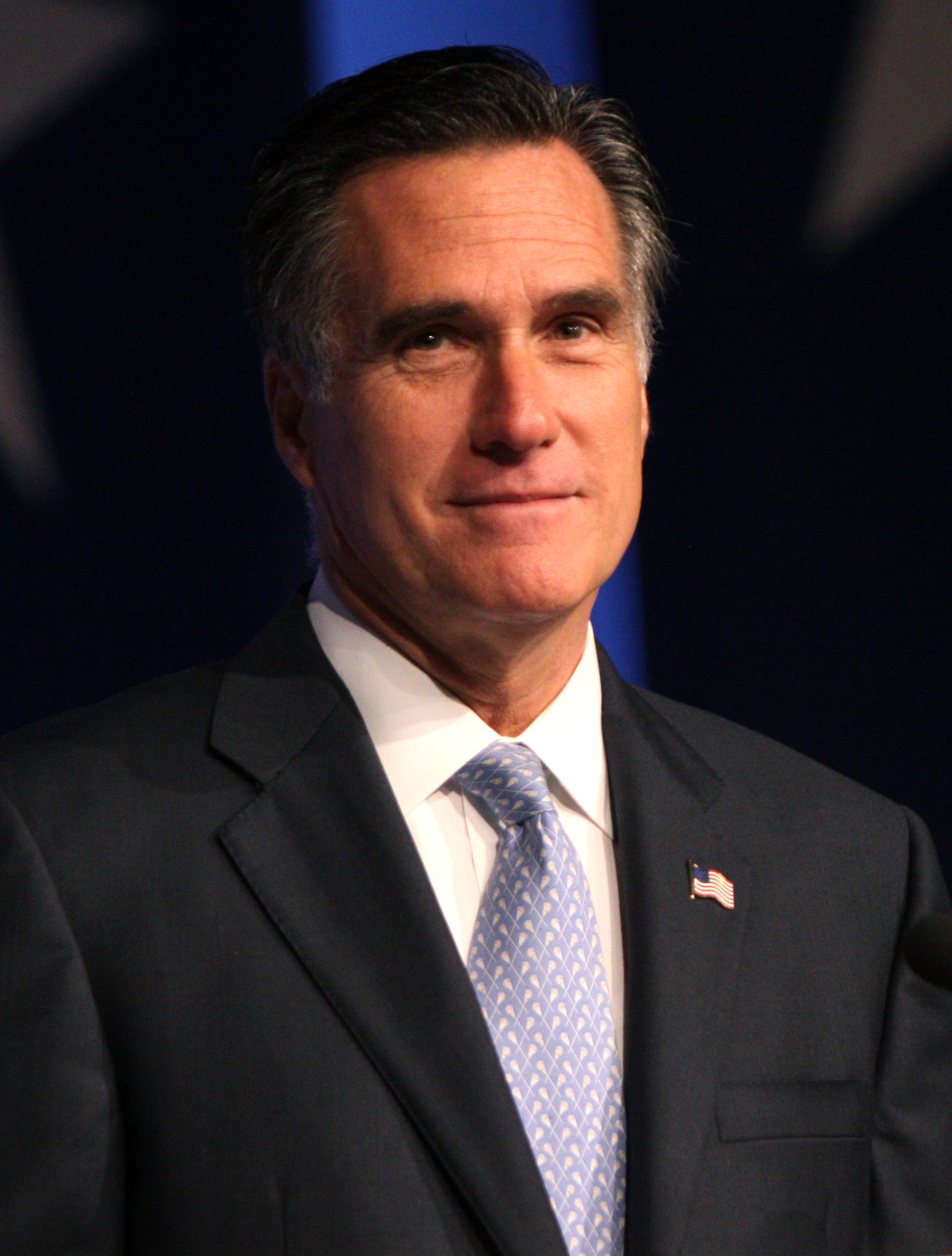

Candidate	John McCain	Mitt Romney	Mike Huckabee
Party	Republican	Republican	Republican
Home state	Arizona	Massachusetts	Arkansas
Delegate count	27	0	0
Popular vote	78,836	49,891	10,607
Percentage	52.00%	32.91%	7.00%
- John McCain

The 2008 Connecticut Republican presidential primary was held on February 5, 2008 (Super Tuesday) as the process by which the U.S. state of Connecticut selected the recipient of 27 of the state's 30 delegates to the Republican National Convention in the process to elect the Republican candidate for the 44th president of the United States. It was a closed primary, restricted to enrolled members of the Republican Party.

== Candidates ==
The following is the order in which Republican candidates appeared on Connecticut's Republican primary ballot on February 5, 2008:

- Rudolph Giuliani, Fred Thompson, Mitt Romney, John McCain, Duncan Hunter, Ron Paul, Mike Huckabee, and Alan Keyes.

By law, "uncommitted" appeared below the list of candidates on the ballots for both parties in Connecticut.

Candidates who dropped out after December 27, 2007, remained on the ballot in Connecticut. Colorado Congressman Tom Tancredo was the only Republican candidate listed as a likely contender in November who withdrew early enough to be removed from the ballot. California Congressman Duncan Hunter, former Tennessee Senator Fred Thompson, and former New York City Mayor Rudy Giuliani withdrew after the December 27 cut-off date, and therefore remained on the ballot.

== History ==
Although the February 5, 2008 primary was the eighth presidential cycle since Connecticut replaced local primaries with a statewide primary in 1977, it was only the sixth primary to feature Republican candidates due to the unchallenged incumbents of Ronald Reagan in 1984 and George W. Bush in 2004. With John McCain having won the 2008 Republican nomination, Connecticut had selected the eventual Republican nominee in 67 percent of past primaries.

The February 5 primary was the first time Connecticut used the optical scan voting system for a primary. The state had first used the technology statewide in the 2007 municipal elections.

== Results ==
Official Results
Candidate	Votes	Percentage	Delegates
John McCain	78,836	52.00%	27
Mitt Romney	49,891	32.91%	0
Mike Huckabee	10,607	7.00%	0
Ron Paul	6,287	4.15%	0
Rudy Giuliani*	2,470	1.63%	0
John Nicah Jr (write-in)	2,462	1.62%	0
Fred Thompson*	538	0.35%	0
Alan Keyes	376	0.25%	0
Duncan Hunter*	137	0.09%	0
Total	151,605	100%	27

* Candidate dropped out of the race before the primary

Turnout was 36.7% of registered Republicans.

== See also ==
- 2008 Connecticut Democratic presidential primary
- 2008 Republican Party presidential primaries
