= Chris Shays =

American politician (born 1945)

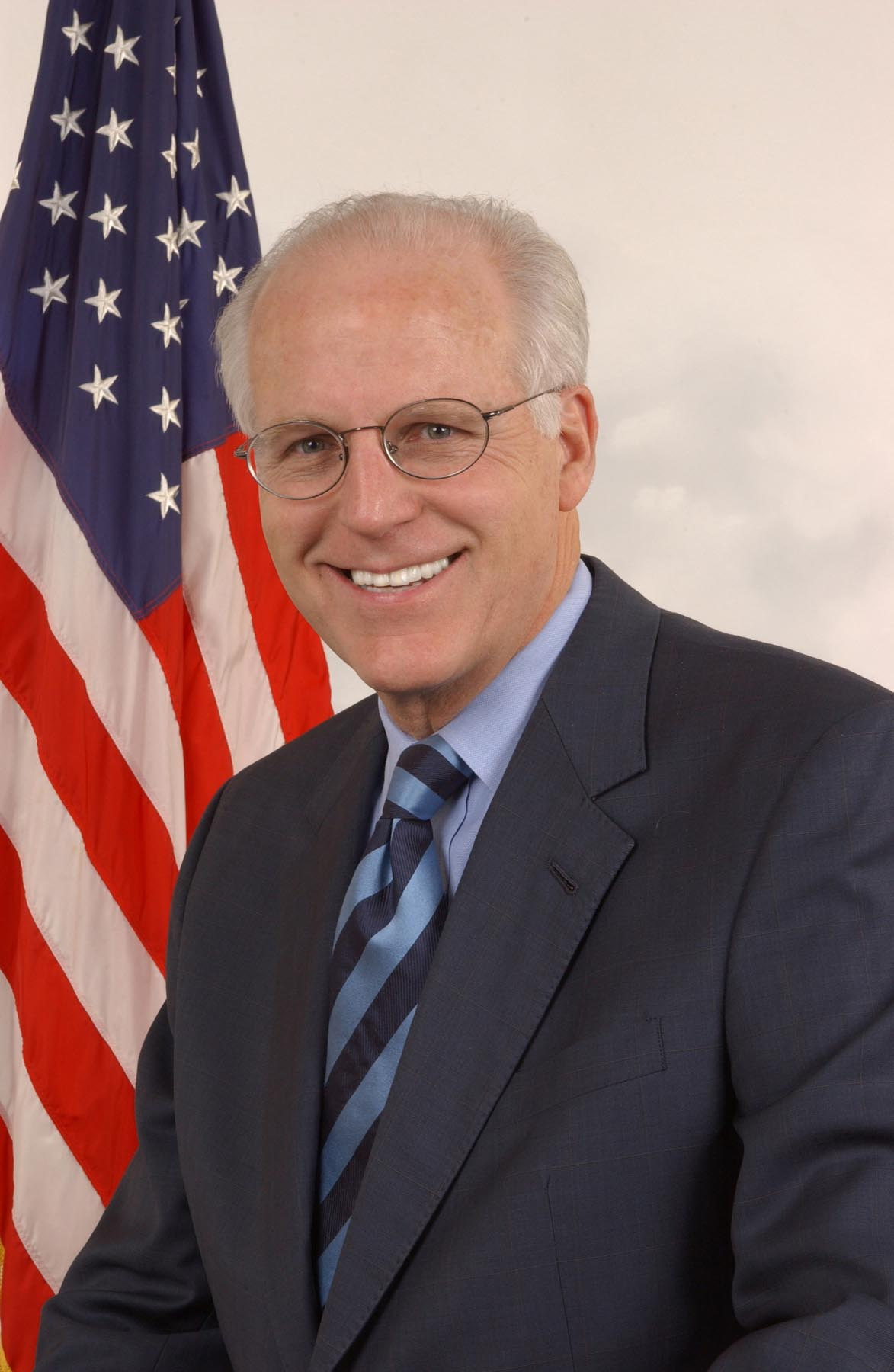

Member of the U.S. House of Representatives from Connecticut's 4th district
- In office August 18, 1987 – January 3, 2009 (Note: Shays's official service begins on the date of the special election, while he was not sworn in until September 9, 1987.)
- Preceded by: Stewart McKinney
- Succeeded by: Jim Himes

Member of the Connecticut House of Representatives from the 147th district
- In office January 8, 1975 – September 8, 1987
- Preceded by: James Bingham
- Succeeded by: Christopher Burnham

Personal details
- Born: Christopher Hunter Shays; October 18, 1945 (age 81) Stamford, Connecticut, U.S.
- Party: Republican
- Spouse: Betsi DeRaismes (m. 1968; died 2025)
- Children: 1
- Education: Principia College (BA); New York University (MBA, MPA)
- Shays's voice Shays discussing bipartisan consensus on the 9/11 Commission's recommendations. Recorded October 7, 2004

Christopher Hunter Shays (born October 18, 1945) is an American politician. He previously served in the United States House of Representatives as representative of the 4th District of Connecticut from 1987 to 2009. He is a member of the Republican Party.

Shays was the only Republican congressman from New England elected to the 110th United States Congress in the 2006 midterm elections. His loss to Jim Himes in the 2008 election made New England's House delegation entirely Democratic in the 111th Congress. He was the most senior member of the House of Representatives to be defeated in the 2008 election.

In 2009, Shays was appointed to co-chair the Commission on Wartime Contracting. The commission is an independent, bipartisan legislative commission established to study wartime contracting in Iraq and Afghanistan. Created in Section 841 of the National Defense Authorization Act for Fiscal Year 2008, this eight-member commission is mandated by Congress to study federal agency contracting for the reconstruction, logistical support of coalition forces, and the performance of security functions in Iraq and Afghanistan. He co-chaired the government watchdog commission that identified and raised alarm over $60 billion of waste, fraud, and abuse in wartime contingency contracting and presented to Congress reforms to address this wasteful spending.

Shays was a candidate for the 2012 Republican U.S. Senate nomination to replace retiring Connecticut senator Joe Lieberman. However, he lost the August 14 primary to Linda McMahon. To date, he is the last Republican to have represented Connecticut in Congress.

== Background ==
Shays was born in Stamford, Connecticut, the son of Margaret "Peggy" (née Oliver) and Thurston Crane Shays. His maternal grandmother was born in Scotland. He grew up in Darien, and graduated from Darien High School in 1964. He attended the Christian Science Principia College in Elsah, Illinois, and received both a Master of Business Administration and a Master of Public Administration from New York University. He lives in the Black Rock section of Bridgeport, Connecticut. Shays has always remained a Christian Scientist—a system of thought and practice derived from the writings of Mary Baker Eddy and the Bible—throughout his life.

Shays married Betsi DeRaismes in 1968. They served together in the Peace Corps in Fiji from 1968 to 1970. They have one daughter.

=== Connecticut General Assembly ===
At the age of 29, Shays was first elected to the Connecticut House where he served from 1975 to 1987. He served simultaneously as the ranking member of both the Appropriations Committee and the Committee on Finance, Revenue, and Bonding. He also served as a member of the Judiciary Committee. He served six days in jail on a contempt charge when he was a member of the Connecticut Legislature protesting judicial corruption.

=== Member of the United States Congress ===
In 1987, Shays won a special election to fill the vacant seat of the late Congressman Stewart McKinney. He represented the 4th congressional district (southwestern Connecticut) until losing to Jim Himes in 2008.

During his 21 years in Congress, Christopher served on the Government Reform, Financial Services, Budget and Homeland Security committees and was the first congressman to enter Iraq after the war.

=== Police incident ===
In 2007, during an incident at the Capitol, a staff member under Shays' supervision attempted to bring a family through a restricted-access door. When a United States Capitol Police officer intervened and prevented their entry, Shays engaged in a heated exchange with the officer. He raised his voice, using profanities, and attempted to inspect the officer's badge for identification. Following the incident, Shays publicly acknowledged his regret for his behavior and accepted full responsibility for his actions.

== Voting record ==
Shays is a moderate Republican. From 1990 onward, Shays voted with the Republican majority 76.8% of the time, voted with the Democratic majority 57.9% of the time and missed 2.5% of the votes. A U.S. News & World Report analysis of Shays' voting record found that he is a moderate, having voted historically more often with liberals than with conservatives, although it noted he voted with Congressional Republicans 80% of the time in 2002.

Shays is labeled by his supporters as a "maverick" and "independent thinker", while conservative detractors regard him as a RINO ("Republican In Name Only"). He and Marty Meehan were the lead sponsors of the House version of the Bipartisan Campaign Reform Act, which President George W. Bush signed into law in 2002. Shays is pro-choice on abortion but voted for the Partial-Birth Abortion Ban Act. Shays was endorsed by the Brady Campaign for his support for gun control and was one of only six Republicans to vote against banning lawsuits against gun manufacturers and distributors in 2005. Despite having voted in favor of the Defense of Marriage Act in 1996, Shays voted against the Federal Marriage Amendment in both 2004 and 2006 that would constitutionally ban same-sex marriage, and co-sponsored a bill to overturn the military's "Don't Ask, Don't Tell" policy that prohibited LGBT troops from serving openly. He was one of the few Republicans to oppose amending the Constitution to ban flag-burning. In 1999 he was one of 20 Republicans to vote against an ultimately failed bill to ban physician-assisted suicide. Shays has long been known for environmental regulations, and was endorsed in the past by the League of Conservation Voters. He also advocates humane treatment of animals and ending discrimination in the workplace. Shays was also one of only four Republicans to vote against all four articles of impeachment against President Bill Clinton.

In April 2005, he broke with most of his party over House Majority Leader Tom DeLay's alleged ethics violations. January 2011, DeLay was convicted of money laundering and sentenced to three years in prison but was freed on bail while appealing his conviction. His comments in 2005 made Shays the first Republican to say DeLay should step down from the Majority Leader post. He fought to maintain the Republican Party rule that requires an indicted leader to step down — the rule that ultimately resulted in Tom DeLay's resignation. Shays stated that he should resign, saying, "Tom's conduct is hurting the Republican Party, is hurting this Republican majority and it is hurting any Republican who is up for re-election."

Shays is a member of or supported by the Republican Main Street Partnership, The Republican Majority for Choice, Republicans for Environmental Protection, It's My Party Too, and the Congressional Wildlife Refuge Caucus.

=== Views on Iraq ===
Shays voted in favor of the 2003 congressional resolution authorizing the use of force in Iraq. In 2003, he was the first U.S. Congressman to visit Iraq after the outbreak of war and he has traveled to Iraq 21 times overall, more than any other U.S. legislator.

From 2003 until August 24, 2006, Shays was a "stalwart supporter" of the War in Iraq, and of a continued U.S. military presence there. Shays has faced a continued political challenge to his views in a district where recent polls show a solid majority of voters disapprove of the 2003 US decision to invade Iraq.

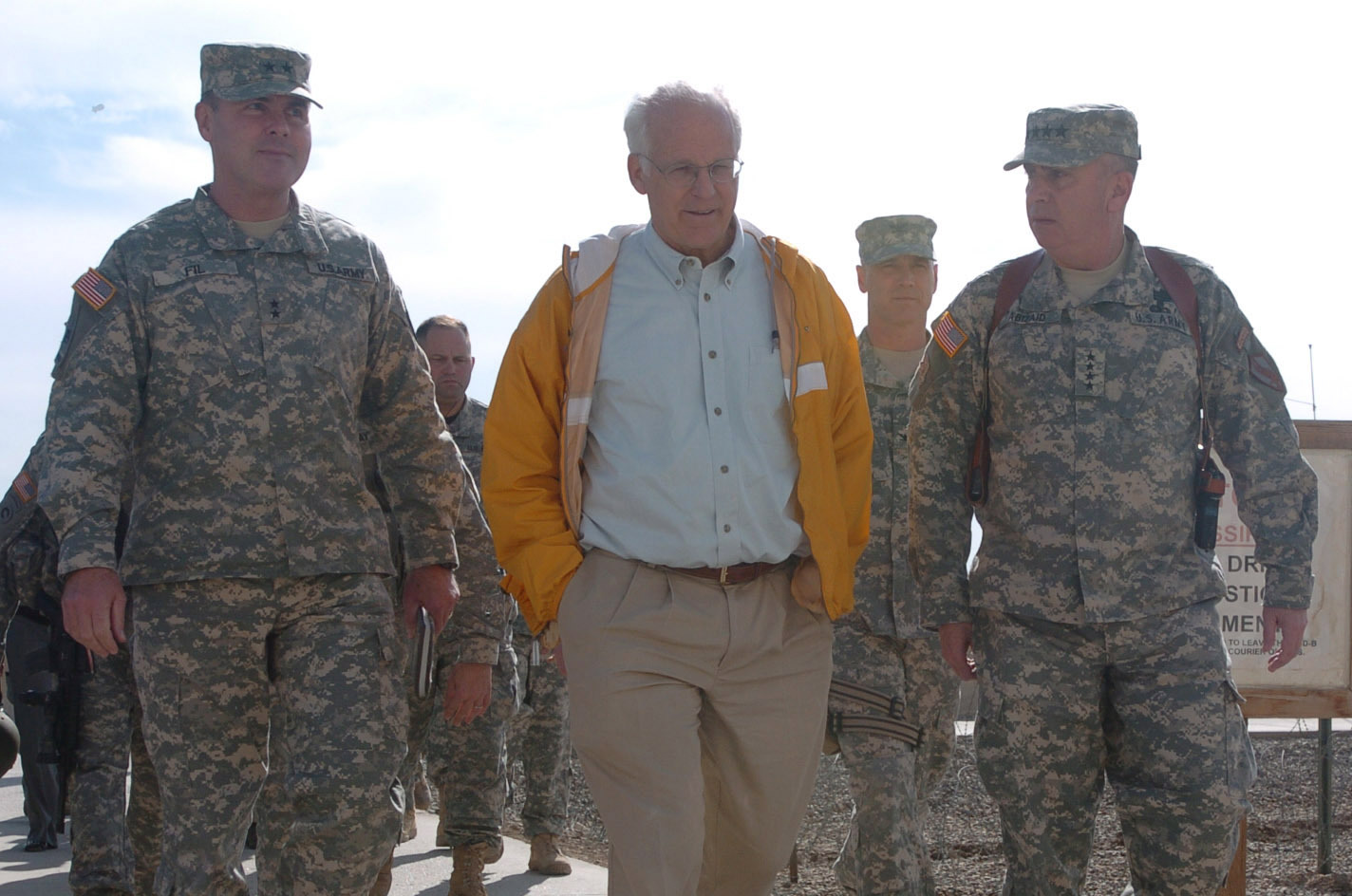
Shays visited troops in Iraq 21 times between 2003 and 2009

On April 10, 2003, Shays told the Connecticut Post that "'The successes to date are extraordinary. The war plan has been nearly flawless. Now we need to make sure the peace plan rises to the same level,' Shays said. 'If we are able to help them form a government quickly, we will be viewed as liberators. If we are there too long, we will be viewed basically as conquerors.'" On August 19, 2004, Shays told reporters, "We're on the right track now." On June 24, 2005, Shays said "We've seen amazing progress [in Iraq]." On July 27, 2005, Shays said on a local radio program that he was optimistic about the future of Iraq, and that he opposed any timetable for troop withdrawal. On June 11, 2006 Shays told the Hartford Courant that his position on the war was a matter of principle and he was not going to stop talking about it.

On October 11, 2006, at a debate Shays sparked outrage from critics with comments about the Abu Ghraib torture and prisoner abuse scandal. "Now I've seen what happened in Abu Ghraib, and Abu Ghraib was not torture. It was outrageous, outrageous involvement of National Guard troops from [Maryland] who were involved in a sex ring and they took pictures of soldiers who were naked, and they did other things that were just outrageous. But it wasn't torture."

Upon returning from an August 2006 Iraq trip, Shays became the first Congressional Republican to call for a timetable for withdrawal of U.S. troops from Iraq. Shays said he was still a supporter of the war, but supported a timetable in order to "encourage some political will on the part of Iraqis".

Shays has staunchly disputed media claims that he has flip-flopped his position on Iraq. "I am not distancing myself from the President," he told the Los Angeles Times on August 25, 2006. That same day, he told other reporters, "I totally support the war," and Shays supported the President's decision to deploy more than 20,000 additional United States combat troops to Iraq on February 17, 2007, when he voted in favor of the surge.

On February 16, 2007, Shays voted against H. Con. Res. 63 (which disapproved of increasing troop levels in Iraq), claiming that "The resolution sends the wrong message to the President, to our troops, and to our enemies" On July 13, 2007 Shays called on Congress to approve withdrawing virtually all American troops from Iraq by December 2008. "I believe we need a timeline. I believe the president's wrong," said Shays. Shays' latest plan marks the first time he has specified dates. On April 13, 2008, Shays defended President Bush's Iraq policy to a town meeting in his home district, telling them, "I support the President on Iraq."

== Elections ==
Shays served as a member of the Connecticut House of Representatives from 1975 to 1987, representing part of Stamford (he has since moved to Bridgeport). Just a few months after starting his seventh term in the state house, Shays entered a special election for the 4th District after 16-year incumbent Stewart McKinney died of AIDS, and won with 57 percent of the vote. He won the seat in his own right in 1988 and was reelected nine times.

From 1988 to 2002, Shays was reelected fairly handily, never dropping below 57 percent of the vote even as the 4th turned more Democratic at the national level. The district, once a classic "Yankee Republican" district, swung heavily Democratic along with the rest of Connecticut from the early 1990s onward; the last Republican presidential candidate to carry it was George H. W. Bush in 1988. However, in 2004, Westport First Selectwoman Diane Farrell held him to only 52 percent of the vote, his closest contest in two decades.

=== 2006 election ===
Shays at a political debate held at Fairfield University in October 2006

In 2006, Shays was in "the fight of his political life", facing a rematch with Farrell. According to U.S. News & World Report, "With money pouring in from the district and from national groups (Farrell expects to raise close to $3 million, Shays a bit less) and unregulated political interest groups targeting Shays with automated calls and negative telemarketing designed as polls, this one already has the odor of ugly." According to the U.S. News report, Farrell says that, in 2002, Shays voted in support of Bush's post-9/11 agenda 80% of the time, but other analyses of his voting record revealed that historically he voted more often with liberals.

Despite the strong challenge from Farrell, Shays was re-elected to Congress in the 2006 election by a slim margin of 6,645 votes (3%). Shays lost Bridgeport, Stamford, Norwalk, Westport, and Weston to Farrell, but her margin in those communities was insufficient to overcome Shays' lead in the more Republican towns in the district.

After the defeats of Nancy Johnson and Rob Simmons, Shays was the only Republican member of the Connecticut congressional delegation, and the only Republican House member from New England.

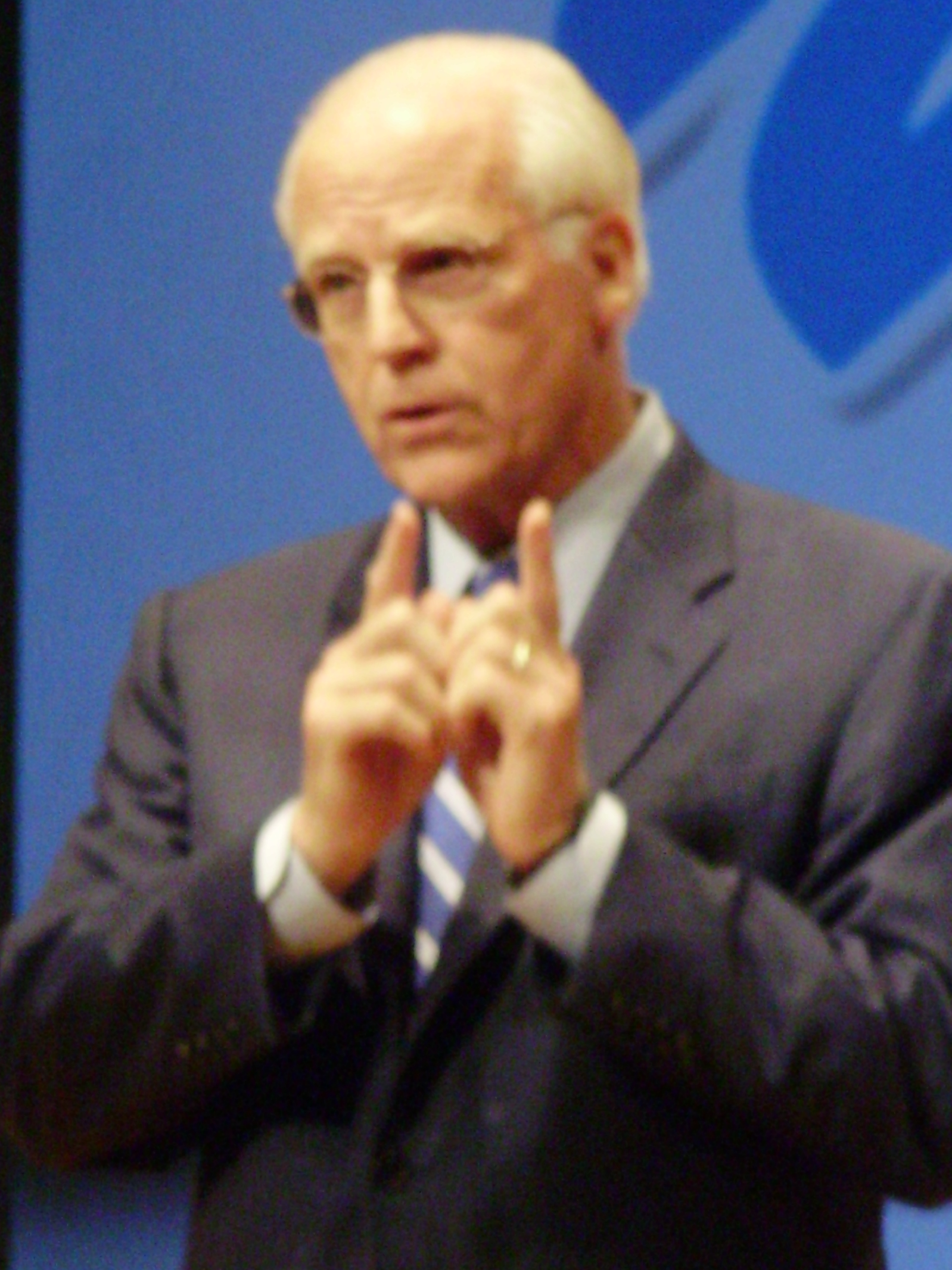
Shays at a debate at Fairfield University

=== 2008 election ===
In the 2008 election, Shays faced Democratic nominee Jim Himes, an affordable housing executive and businessman; Libertarian nominee M.A. Carrano, an experimental philosopher, systems consultant and author; and Green Party nominee Richard Duffee. Shays was defeated by Himes 51% to 48%. Himes was likely assisted by Barack Obama's landslide victory in the 4th; Obama carried the district with 60% of the vote, one of the largest margins for a Republican-held district. Shays' defeat resulted in there being no Republicans representing New England in the House for the first time since the GOP's inception in the 1850s.

Shays carried 14 of the 17 towns in his district. However, Himes took the three largest towns—Bridgeport, Norwalk and Stamford. Ultimately, Shays could not overcome a landslide loss in Bridgeport, the largest city in the district, where he won only 19% of the vote.

== 2012 U.S. Senate candidacy ==
Shays officially entered the 2012 U.S. Senate race on August 22, 2011, to replace retiring senator Joe Lieberman. At the Connecticut State Republican Convention, Linda McMahon earned the endorsement of the state Republican Party by a delegate vote of 658 to 351 over Shays. The two were the only candidates to qualify for the primary, which would take place on August 14, 2012.

A series of independent polls had shown Shays defeating or in dead heat with the top Democratic contenders in the general election, while those same polls show McMahon losing handily to each of the top Democratic contenders. The Shays campaign asserted the former Congressman showed more electability than McMahon, due to her loss in an open Senate seat contest in 2010 by a large margin despite spending $50 million of her own money, also citing her high unfavorable numbers among state voters, and the weak fundraising numbers of the McMahon campaign.

Despite support among Independents and even some Democrats, Shays faced a significant obstacles in the primary trailing in both campaign funds and poll results. Outspent by more than $60 million, Shays was defeated by a three-to-one margin in the primary. She faced Democratic Representative Chris Murphy in the general election and lost, marking her second consecutive defeat in two years.

== Subsequent career ==
In 2013, Shays was a signatory to an amicus curiae brief submitted to the Supreme Court in support of same-sex marriage during the Hollingsworth v. Perry case. He was mentioned as a potential candidate for Governor of Connecticut in 2014, but ultimately did not enter that race.

In the 2016 Republican presidential primary, Shays originally endorsed Ohio Governor John Kasich. After Donald Trump won the Republican primary, he announced in August 2016 that he would vote for Democratic nominee Hillary Clinton in the general election.

He served as a Fellow at the Harvard Institute of Politics in Spring 2017.

He endorsed Joe Biden, for President of the United States of America in the 2020 United States elections.

In 2020, Shays, along with over 130 other former Republican national security officials, signed a statement that asserted that President Trump was unfit to serve another term, and "To that end, we are firmly convinced that it is in the best interest of our nation that Vice President Joe Biden be elected as the next President of the United States, and we will vote for him."

In August 2024, he joined the "Republicans for Harris" group along with other former Republican officials in opposition to Trump.

== Former committee assignments ==
- Oversight and Government Reform Committee
  - Subcommittee on National Security and Foreign Affairs (Ranking Member)
  - Subcommittee on Domestic Policy
- Financial Services Committee
  - Subcommittee on Capital Markets, Insurance, and Government Sponsored Enterprises
  - Subcommittee on Housing and Community Opportunity
- Homeland Security Committee
  - Subcommittee on Intelligence, Information Sharing and Terrorism Risk Assessment
- Co-founded the Congressional National Service Caucus
- Co-Chair of the Congressional Arts Caucus
- Co-Chair and Co-Founder of the Congressional Friends of Animals Caucus
- Co-Chair of the Nonproliferation Task Force

== See also ==
- Factions in the Republican Party (United States)

== Notes ==
U.S. House of Representatives
Preceded by Stewart McKinney	Member of the U.S. House of Representatives from Connecticut's 4th congressional district 1987–2009	Succeeded by Jim Himes
U.S. order of precedence (ceremonial)
Preceded by Jack Kingston as Former U.S. Representative	Order of precedence of the United States as Former U.S. Representative	Succeeded by Dutch Ruppersberger as Former U.S. Representative
