= Not My Dog =

2026 American family film

- Directed by: Danny LeGare
- Written by: Danny LeGare
- Produced by: Danny LeGare
- Starring: Rylie Pennington; Eric Roberts; Dan Lauria; Marika Domińczyk; Jeremy London; Robert Ri'chard
- Production company: Trash Panda Pictures
- Release dates: August 1, 2026 (Vermont Film Festival); September 11, 2026 (United States)
- Running time: 81 minutes
- Country: United States
- Language: English

Not My Dog is a 2026 American family film written and directed by Danny LeGare. Rylie Pennington plays a twelve-year-old girl who is followed through her small Connecticut town by a stray black German Shepherd. Eric Roberts, Dan Lauria, Marika Domińczyk, Jeremy London and Robert Ri'chard appear in supporting roles. The film was shot in Vernon, Connecticut, and released on digital platforms on September 11, 2026.

== Premise ==
Bridget, a twelve-year-old girl who would rather stay home, is sent to bring lunch to her father's barbershop. A stray black German Shepherd starts following her and will not leave. She spends the day trying to lose him, telling everyone she meets that he is not her dog, and ends up naming him Nudge. Along the way she runs into a chess player, a street performer, a bully, a neighbor who wants the dog gone, and an animal control officer.

== Cast ==
- Rylie Pennington as Bridget
- Eric Roberts as Chuck
- Dan Lauria as Mr. Tucker
- Marika Domińczyk as Mrs. Athelia
- Jeremy London as Carl
- Robert Ri'chard as Sammy
- Mark Famiglietti as Frank, Bridget's father
- Ashley Ottesen as Lisa, Bridget's mother
- Sal Rendino as Officer Phil
- Analise Scarpaci as Jessie
- Inkosi as Nudge

== Production ==
LeGare founded Trash Panda Pictures, an independent studio in Vernon, Connecticut, to make films for tween audiences. He wrote the stray as a black German Shepherd because of black dog syndrome, the belief that black dogs in shelters are adopted less often than lighter ones, and because German Shepherds in films are usually police or military dogs. "I really wanted to do something where we could rework that narrative of this dog can actually be a really loving, really kind, really fun dog to be around," he told CT Insider.

Nudge is played by Inkosi, a trained protection dog, in his first film role. Pennington, who lives in Goodyear, Arizona, was twelve when the film was made and had not led a feature film before. Analise Scarpaci wrote an original song for the film, "Unlikely Friends", which she performs with Pennington.

Filming took place in the Rockville section of Vernon, including a barbershop on West Main Street, Henry Park, residential streets and the mill complex that houses the New England Motorcycle Museum. The production used six-hour shooting days built around its child and animal performers.

== Release ==
Not My Dog screened at the Vermont Film Festival on August 1, 2026, and premiered in New York City on August 31. It was released on digital platforms in the United States on September 11, 2026, including Amazon Prime Video, Apple TV and YouTube Movies. The producers committed five percent of net proceeds to animal rescue partners, including the 15/10 Foundation.

== Reception ==
Alan Ng of Film Threat scored the film 7.5 out of 10 and wrote, "When all Hollywood wants to do is throw dark subject matter at kids, LeGare's tale is a breath of fresh air." Christie Cronan of Common Sense Media gave it three stars out of five, recommended it for ages eight and up and called it "a gentle, family-friendly drama"; she noted some mild name-calling and a scene in which a character feeds the dog chocolate. Karen Snyder of The Knockturnal wrote that although the film is aimed at tweens, "it is a film that audiences of all ages can enjoy." Bheema Bachus of Incluvie rated it four out of five.
