= Florence Mill =

- U.S. National Register of Historic Places
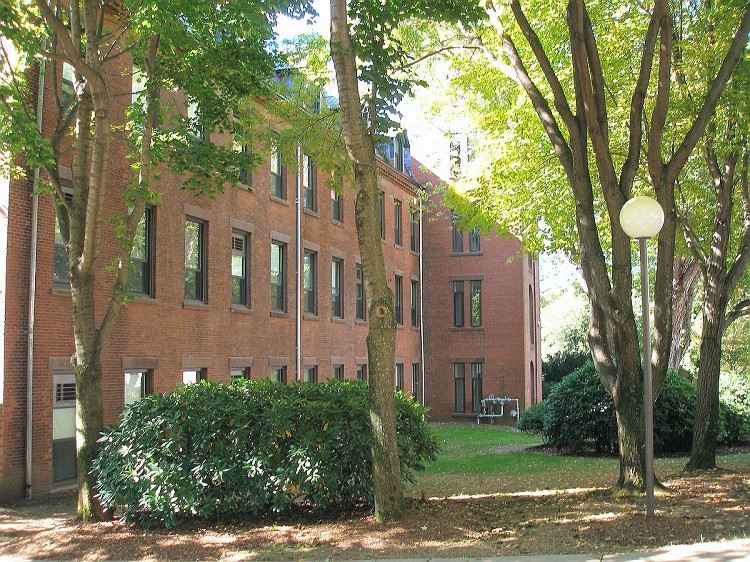
- Florence Mill in 2006

- Location within Connecticut Location within the United States
- Location: 121 West Main Street, Rockville, Connecticut
- Coordinates: 41°51′52″N 72°27′15″W
- Area: 6.4 acres (2.6 ha)
- Built: 1864
- Architectural style: Second Empire, Italianate, Queen Anne
- NRHP reference No.: 78002858
- Added to NRHP: July 18, 1978

The Florence Mill, known later as the U. S. Envelope Building, is a former industrial facility located at 121 West Main Street in the Rockville section of Vernon, Connecticut. Developed in stages between 1864 and 1916, it exhibits changes in mill construction technology over that period, include a rare early example of Second Empire architecture. Now converted into senior housing, it was listed on the National Register of Historic Places in 1978.

== Description and history ==
The former Florence Mill complex is located in Vernon's industrial Rockland section, on the south side of West Main Street opposite its junction with Ward Street. It is set on 6.4 acres (2.6 ha) of land between West Main Street and the Hockanum River, which historically provided its power. Its main building is a four-story brick structure, more than 200 feet (61 m) in length, with a Second Empire-style mansard roof and an Italianate tower. To this are appended a number of later buildings, also built out of brick, with later industrial Italianate features.

The Florence Mill was built in 1864 to replace an earlier textile mill which was destroyed by fire. In 1881, it was described as the largest brick building in Rockville, and continued in the production of textiles. It was purchased in 1881 by White & Corbin, who expanded the building several times, making it the largest manufacturing plant in the United States for the manufacture of envelopes. The building was used for this purpose by White & Corbin and its successors (including the U. S. Envelope Company), until 1975. Currently, the building is used as an independent living retirement home and has 113 apartments.

== See also ==
- National Register of Historic Places listings in Tolland County, Connecticut
