= Shenipsit Lake =

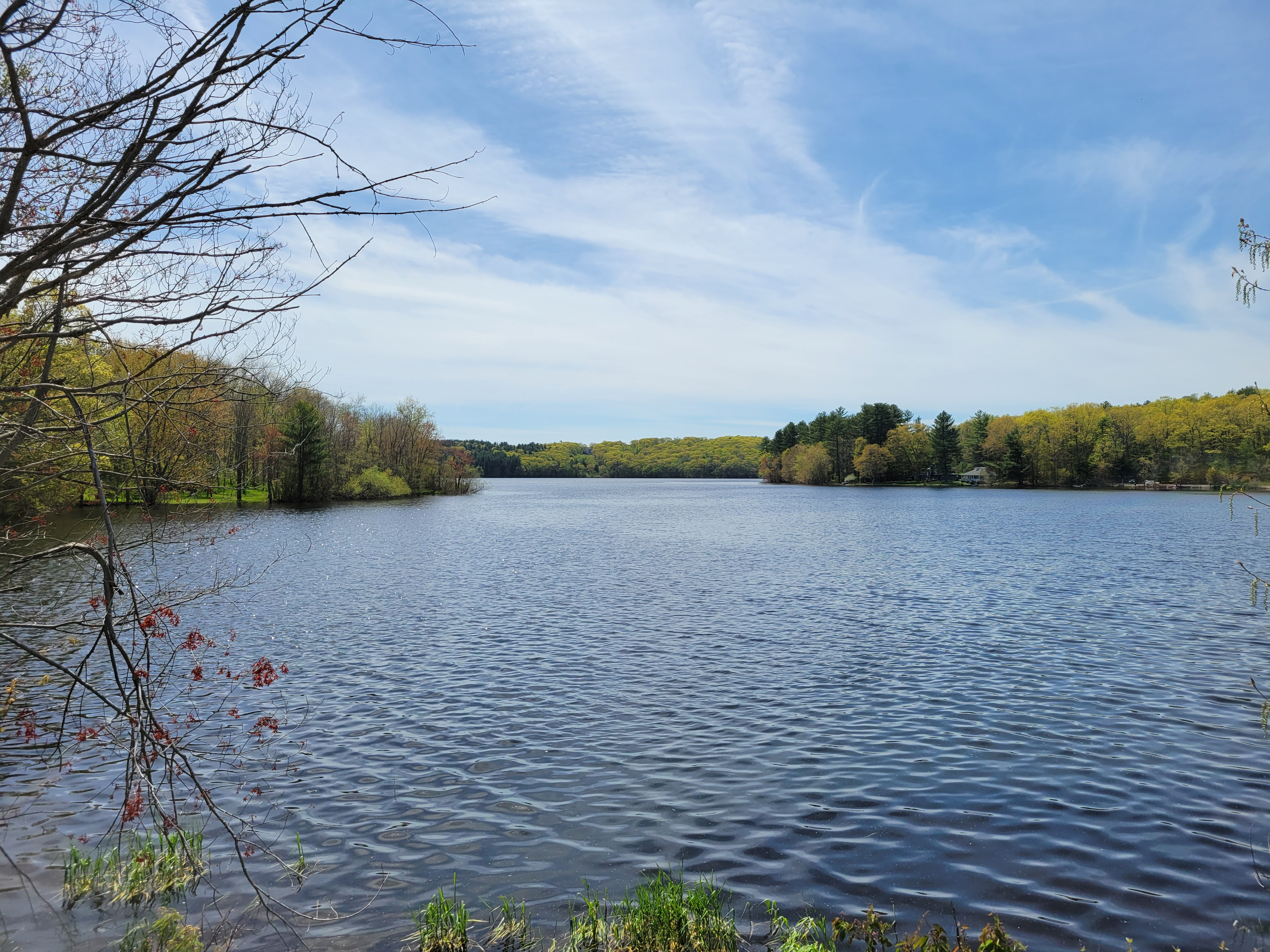
- Shenipsit Lake

- Location within Connecticut Location within the United States
- Location: Tolland County, Connecticut
- Coordinates: 41°53′4.7″N 72°25′34″W
- Type: natural lake, reservoir
- Primary outflows: Hockanum River
- Basin countries: United States
- Surface area: 522.8 acres (2.116 km^{2})

Shenipsit Lake (or Snipsic lake; shin-ip-SIT), known locally as "The Snip", is a natural lake used as a water storage facility with a water size of 522.8 acres (2.116 km^{2}) located in Tolland County, Connecticut, bordering the towns of Ellington, Tolland and the Rockville section of Vernon, Connecticut, at 41°53′4.7″N 72°25′34″W. It is the source of the Hockanum River.

== History ==
Native American trails pass directly by Shenipsit Lake. The trails were used by early European settlers to proceed from the East towards the Connecticut River. The trail exists in parts unpaved near the lake.
