= Saxony Mill =

- U.S. National Register of Historic Places
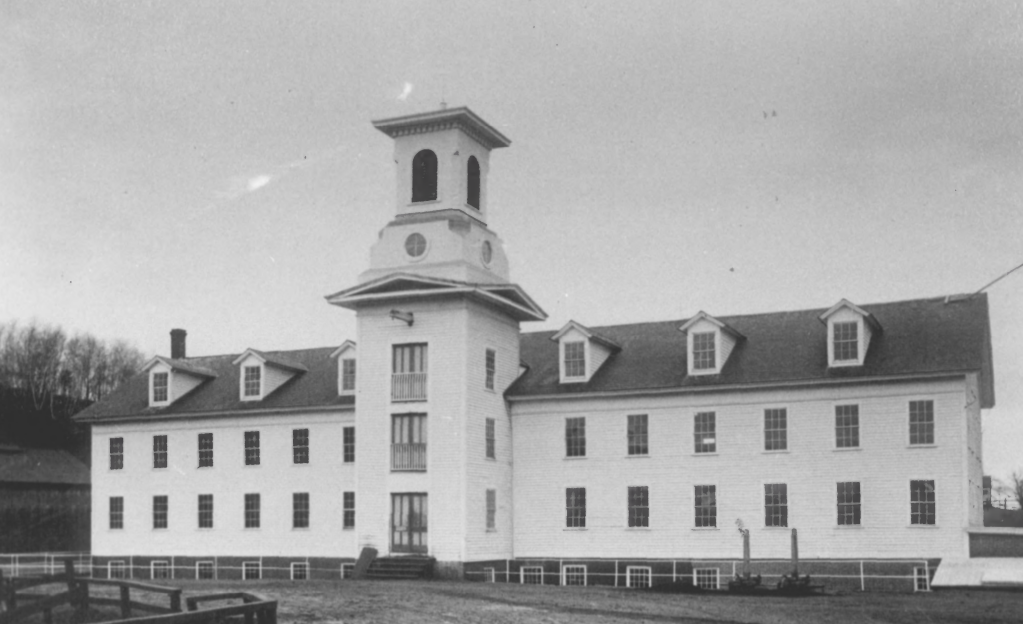
- c. 1895 photo

- Location within Connecticut Location within the United States
- Location: 66 West Street, Rockville, Connecticut
- Coordinates: 41°51′58″N 72°27′56″W
- Area: 3 acres (1.2 ha)
- Built: 1836
- Architectural style: Greek Revival
- NRHP reference No.: 83003592
- Added to NRHP: November 10, 1983

The Saxony Mill was a historic textile mill complex at 66 West Street in Rockville section of Vernon, Connecticut. With a construction history dating to 1836, it was one of the oldest surviving wood-frame textile mills in the state prior to a 1994 fire which led to its demolition. The mill complex was added to the National Register of Historic Places in 1983.

== Description and history ==
The Saxony Mill complex stood at the western end of Rockville's industrial area, occupying the lowest water privilege in the town on the Hockanum River. It was located at the western end of West Main Street, at its junction with West Street. The site is now a public park. The mill consisted of seven connected structures, most of brick and masonry, built between 1836 and the 1970s. The main (original) mill building was a 2 1/2-story wood-frame structure with a distinctive five-story bell tower rising from the center of its front facade. The remaining structures, all built with load-bearing masonry walls, were added after c. 1870.

The oldest portion of the mill, the northern section of the main building, was built in 1836. The Saxony Mill Company was founded in 1838 as a joint-stock company organized by that mill's proprietors. The mill at first produced satinet, a woolen material developed as a less-expensive alternative to fine woolens which were then only available from England. The mill went through a series of owners who used the complex in different aspects of textile production until 1951, when most of Rockville's mills were closed. The main mill was enlarged in 1861, and various additions were made in the early decades of the 20th century. Most recently operated by Plastifoam, a suspicious fire on July 25, 1994, did extensive damage to the then-vacant building and surrounding buildings, and disrupted power to thousands of people. The remaining structure was demolished a short time later. The site is now a municipal park.

== See also ==
- National Register of Historic Places listings in Tolland County, Connecticut
