= Stuart J. Murphy =

American writer

Stuart J. Murphy (born 1942) is a visual learning specialist and children’s book author. Murphy was born and raised in Rockville, Connecticut, and studied illustration at the Rhode Island School of Design (RISD).

Before co-founding Ligature, a Chicago-based design firm that developed Social Studies, Reading, Science, and Math textbook programs for educational publishers with his business partner Richard Anderson in 1980, Murphy worked as Art Director at Ginn and Company, a Boston-based publisher. While at Ginn, he took a company-sponsored sabbatical to advise on art restorations in Venice, Italy in 1973-74.

In 1995, the first three books in Murphy’s 63 book MathStart series were published by HarperCollins Children’s Books. MathStart books teach mathematical skills such as identifying patterns, skip counting and solving for unknowns through a combination of storytelling and visual learning strategies. The series is divided into 3 levels for children ages Pre-K through Grade 4. Taken separately, the 21 Level 1 books comprise one of the largest Pre-K math series available.

The MathStart books have received many honors, including being named a Top Ten Nonfiction Series for Young Children by Booklist magazine, a publication of the American Library Association, in and awards from The Bank Street College of Education and The Oppenheim Toy Portfolio. Murphy’s story on negative numbers, Less Than Zero, was named a "Best Book of the Year" by AAAS Science Books & Films magazine. MathStart stories have been translated into Spanish, Korean, Arabic and Chinese and in 2013, sales topped 10 million books.

The Main Street Kids’ Club, an original musical based on six of the MathStart books, was workshopped at Northwestern University under the aegis of Rives Collins. Playwright and director Scott Ferguson, who also adapted and directed School House Rock Live! led the workshop, collaborating with composer Michael Mahler on music. Music Theatre International (MTI) coordinates licensing for regional theaters and school tours.

Murphy’s second series, Stuart J. Murphy’s I See I Learn, focuses on Social, Emotional, Health and Safety and Cognitive skills for children in Pre-K and Grade 1. Published by Charlesbridge, the stories feature the students in Miss Cathy’s class at Ready Set Pre-K in See-and-Learn City. Visual learning strategies and a special section for parents and teachers called “A Closer Look” support the learning. Each book has been vetted by a team of early childhood experts.

The series is also available as an educational program with teacher guides, videos and games through Pearson Education as I See I Learn at School.

Murphy has been a featured speaker at several educational conferences including NCTM, NCSM, IRA, NAEYC and NHSA. He also served on the executive committee for the Advisory Council to the Arts in Education Program at the Harvard Graduate School of Education and is an Honorary Trustee of the Rhode Island School of Design after serving 19 years on the Board.

Murphy lives with his wife Nancy in Boston, Massachusetts and Prota, Italy. They have two children and three grandchildren. The elder two have MathStart books named after them (Jack the Builder and Mighty Maddie), while the youngest, Camille, provided the inspiration for her namesake character in the I See I Learn books.

Related Reading:

• How to Read a Book Using Visual Learning Strategies by Stuart J. Murphy (handout)

• Math Boring? Not at All! The New York Times Editorial, MathStart and the Importance of Early Childhood Education by Stuart J. Murphy (vizlearning post)

• Preparing Preschoolers for the Common Core by Stuart J. Murphy (BookLinks magazine)
