= New England Motorcycle Museum =

Museum in Connecticut, U.S.

- Location in Rockville, Connecticut
- Established: 2018
- Location: 200 West Main Street, Rockville, Connecticut, U.S.
- Coordinates: 41.865546°N 72.460127°W
- Type: Motorcycle
- Visitors: 10,000 (2019)
- Owner: Ken Kaplan
- Website: www.newenglandmotorcyclemuseum.org

The New England Motorcycle Museum is a motorcycle museum located in Rockville, Connecticut.

== History ==
The museum is in the Hockanum Mill, a 207-year-old textile mill that had been abandoned in 1951. In 2013, Ken Kaplan, founder of the museum, purchased the 11-acre property and began to restore to use to house his computer company and motorcycle dealership, and to establish a motorcycle museum. The restoration of the building took just under seven years. The exterior and interior of the building had to be restored, and debris on the property had to be removed. Fifteen 50-gallon drums of lead paint chips and arsenic were removed from the building. Over $6.5 million has been spent on opening the museum, including $4 million in state loans and donations from the Town of Vernon. The museum grand opening was held on August 25, 2018.

== Collection ==
The New England Motorcycle Museum has nearly 200 vintage motorcycles, dating from 1920 to 2021, making the museum the largest collection of vintage motorcycles in the Northeast, and one of the largest motorcycle museums in the country. The museum contains motorcycle memorabilia as well as a motorcycle library.
