= The Tower on Fox Hill =

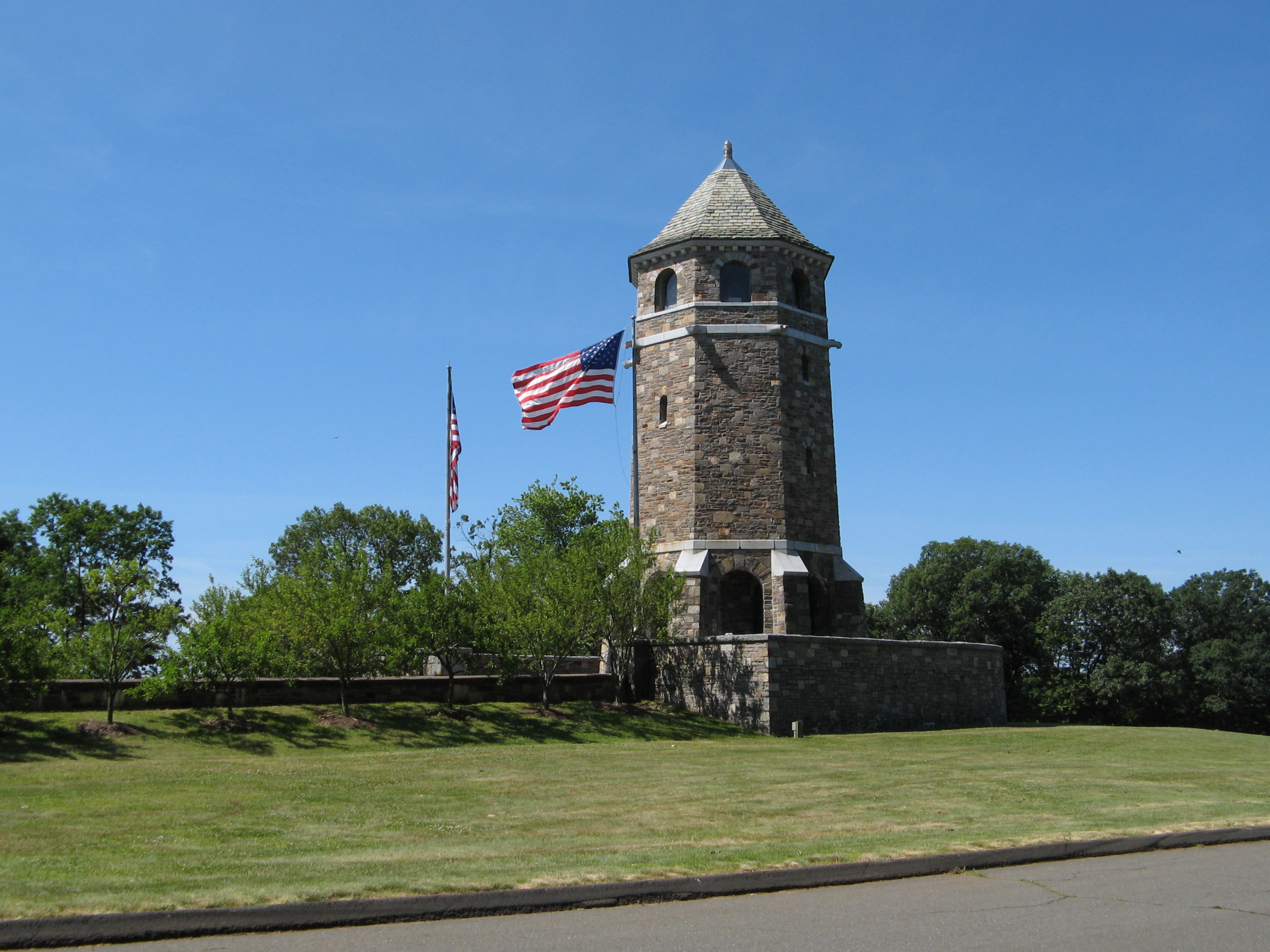
- The Tower on Fox Hill, Vernon, Connecticut
- Location: Fox Hill in Rockville, Connecticut
- Coordinates: 41.8632°N 72.4443°W
- Type: Tower
- Material: Brick
- Length: 220 feet (67 m)
- Height: 72 feet (22 m)
- Beginning date: 1937
- Completion date: 1939
- Opening date: August 5, 1939
- Dedicated to: Veterans of Vernon, Connecticut

Tower on Fox Hill (also known locally as the War Memorial Tower) is a building located at the summit of Fox Hill in Rockville, Connecticut. The current tower, 72 feet (22 m) high, stands on the site of a former 60-foot (18 m) tower, which stood briefly during the late 19th century.

== History ==
In colonial times, when Native Americans still controlled the area, the Podunk used the hill as a lookout. They were competing with the Nipmuc and Mohegan for control of the areas around Mischenipsit Lake.

Fox Hill commands a broad view of the Connecticut River Valley. Weather permitting, Mount Tom, Mount Holyoke and Talcott Mountain may be seen from it by the naked eye. At the time, the hill was without trees and growth. Each year, the Podunk burned the undergrowth as part of the forest management that they practiced. They also burned wood for fires, and European-American settlers cut down any large trees for firewood. The cleared land was used by colonists as pastureland. Early photographs of Fox Hill show some small trees only at the summit.

In 1878 Richard Alonzo Jeffrey of Meriden erected a wooden observation tower on the hill. It was 20-feet-square at the base and extended sixty feet (18 m) upward; a 10-square-foot (0.93 m^{2}) platform was constructed at the top. The walls of the ground floor were enclosed, and ice cream and refreshments were sold. The upper platforms were open. A telescope was available and a 15¢ admission fee was charged to climb the tower and use the 'spy glass.'

Jeffrey's Tower was very popular. On February 3, 1880, a severe blizzard destroyed the structure. It was not rebuilt and the broken timbers became overgrown with vines and bushes. The first floor remained standing. The noted still life painter Charles Ethan Porter, whose sister Cynthia had married R. A. Jeffrey, used it as his studio around 1889. He used it as a shelter for painting during the winter or when it rained.

After Porter died in 1923, the small structure fell into total disrepair. Its remains gradually disappeared under overgrowth. During the next 60 years two homes were built on the south side of the summit.

The Memorial Tower was constructed in 1937 and completed in 1939, as a collaborative WPA project to hire workers during the Great Depression and invest in projects to benefit local cities. It is dedicated to the veterans of all wars from the Town of Vernon. The dedication took place on August 5, 1939. The building cost approximately $75,000. The United States Work Projects Administration supplied the labor and materials. The town, city, and individuals contributed the rest.

The War Memorial Tower is 72 feet (22 m) high, resting on solid rock. Its promenade is 220 feet (67 m) long. The tower is made of native stone. An observation platform is located near the top of the tower. Bronze tablets bearing the names and inscriptions of three branches of the United States military – Army, Navy and Marine Corps – are fixed to the walls.

The tower is now part of Henry Park (named after E. Stevens Henry, the first landowner after purchase from the Podunk). It is maintained by the Vernon-Rockville Parks and Recreation Department.

It is currently the highest man-made point in Vernon, Connecticut.
