= William Churchill Hammond =

American organist, choirmaster and educator

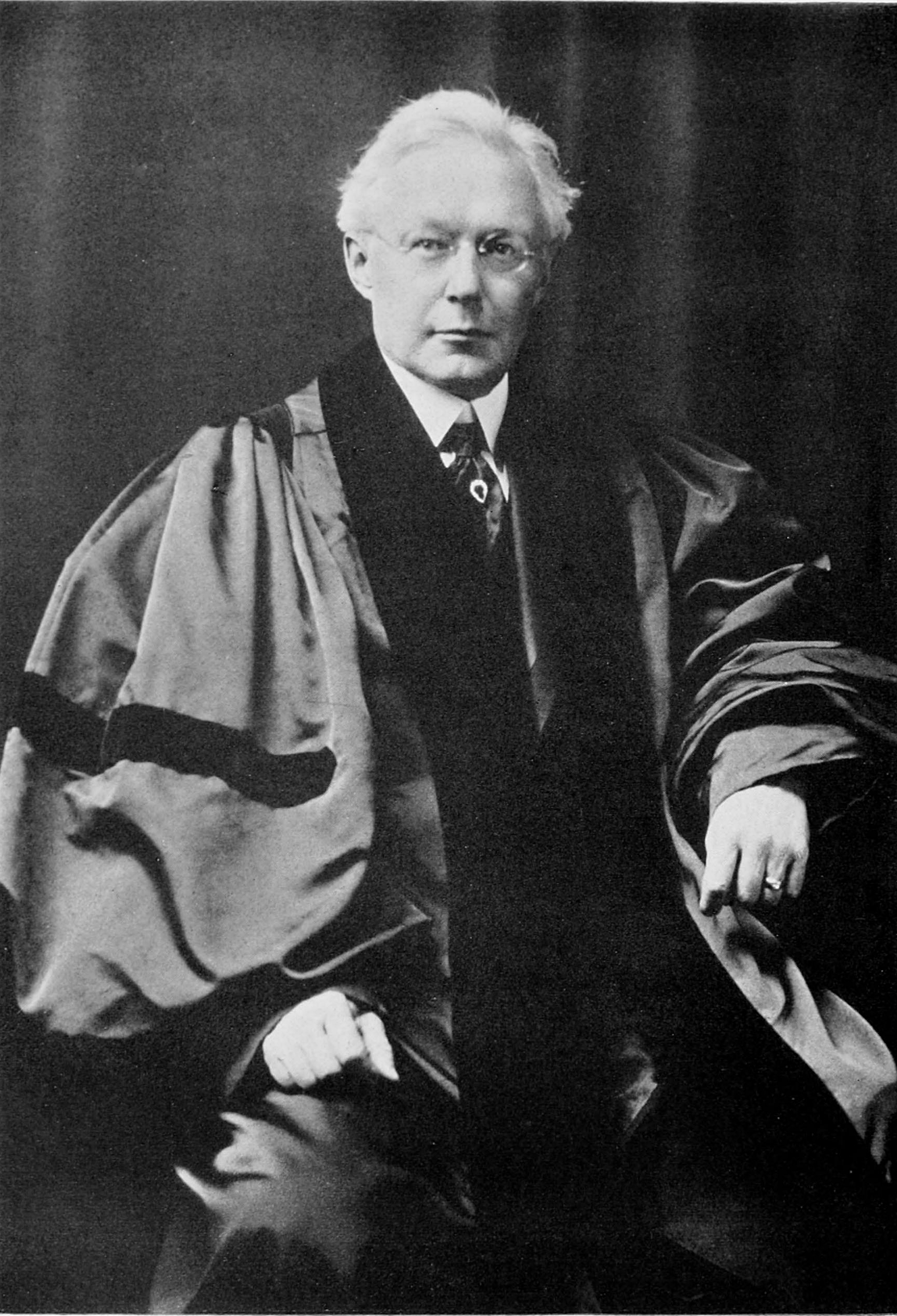
- Hammond in academic regalia, c. 1916
- Born: November 25, 1860; Rockville, Connecticut, U.S.
- Died: April 15, 1949 (aged 88); Holyoke, Massachusetts
- Occupations: Organist, choirmaster, educator
- Years active: 1876–1949
- Spouse: Fanny Bliss Reed (m. 1898)

William Churchill Hammond (November 25, 1860 – April 15, 1949) was an American organist, choirmaster, and music educator. He is noted for being one of the founding members of the American Guild of Organists, and for a lengthy tenure on the faculty of Mount Holyoke College.

Hammond was born in Rockville, Connecticut. In 1885, at the age of 25 he became organist and music director of Holyoke's Second Congregational Church, (Note: Presently known as the United Congregational Church of Holyoke.) a post that he served for nearly 60 years. He married Fannie Reed, daughter of Second Congregational's pastor. Among his pupils was John Shea, who would later write Notre Dame's Victory March, first playing it for his former teacher on the congregational church's organ in 1908.

He first joined the faculty of Smith College. In 1899 he joined faculty of Mount Holyoke College (as one of the first two male faculty) and remained there for over 40 years. In 1924 he received an honorary Doctor of Music degree from Mount Holyoke, in 1935 he established a music major, and in 1936 he resigned the position of chair of the music department.

Throughout his career Hammond himself would give more than 1,200 local recitals as well as organize and tour Mount Holyoke's Carol Choir to venues across the country, including the White House.

Hammond was also a collector of folklore songs, arranging and publishing Christmas carols through the New Haven Carol Society for more than 35 years, as well as most notably being the first musician to formally put the American folk-tune White's Air into print.

In December 1942, Holyoke's daily newspaper Transcript-Telegram awarded Hammond with its third William G. Dwight Distinguished Service to Holyoke award.
