= Hockanum River =

River in Connecticut, United States

Coordinates: 41°50′55″N 72°29′32″W

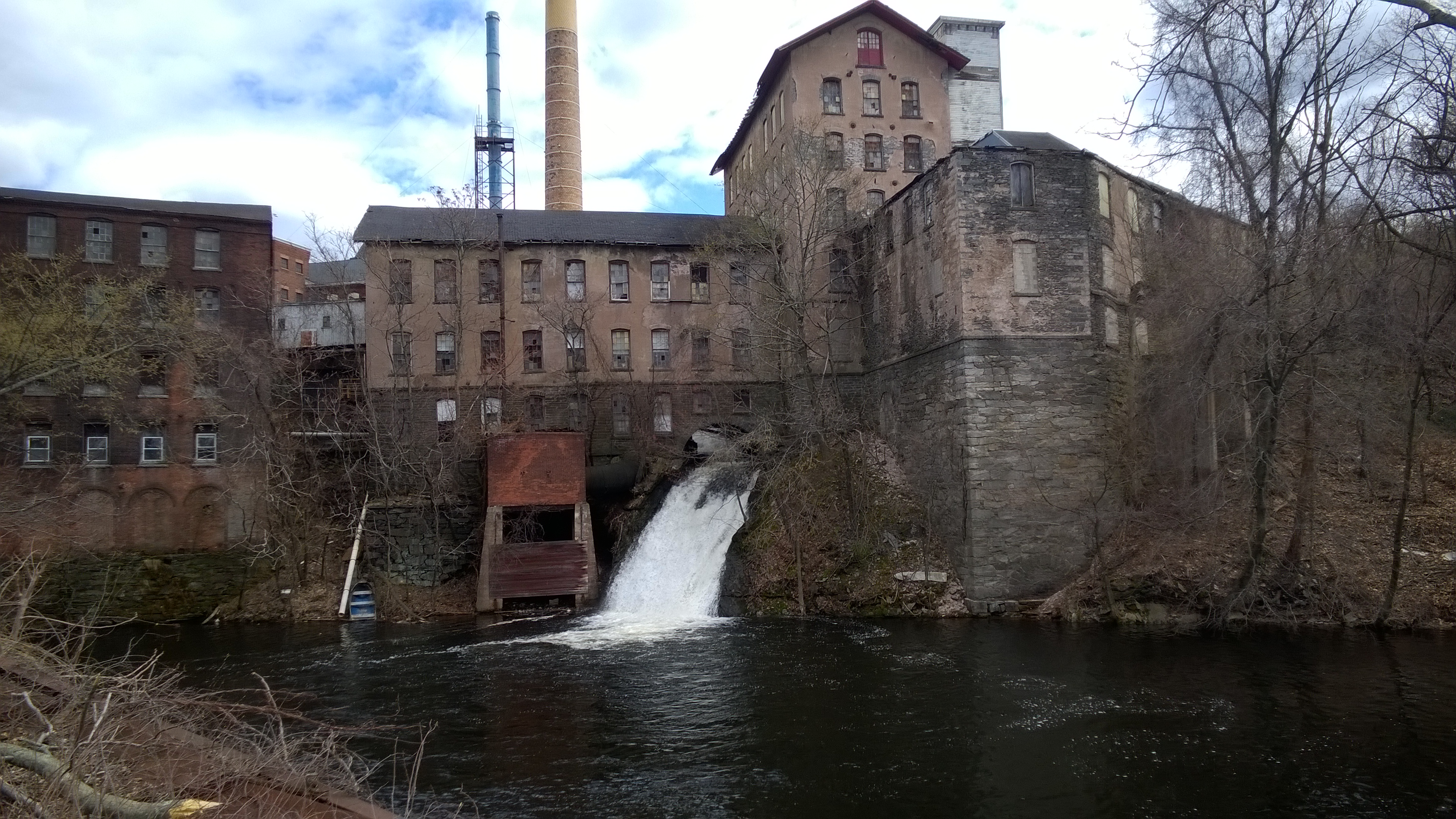
The Hockanum River flowing through a textile mill in Downtown Rockville, Connecticut.

The Hockanum River is a river in Connecticut, United States. Hockanum is derived from the Native American Podunk people Algonquin language word meaning "hook-shaped", so named because of the course of the river. The Hockanum neighborhood in East Hartford is named after it.

It rises at the outlet of Shenipsit Lake in Rockville, then flows through Vernon, Ellington, Manchester, and East Hartford. Its mouth on the Connecticut River is immediately north of the Charter Oak Bridge and south of and across from the mouth of the Park River.

The Hockanum River runs for about 22.6 miles (36.4 km) until it spills into the Connecticut River. There is a popular paddling route that follows the river for 13 miles (21 km). It begins at the bridge at Pleasant View Drive, one mile west of Vernon Center, and continues to the Connecticut River. This river run is mostly quickwater with one Class II whitewater area that eventually fades to flatwater and tidal water at its mouth at the Connecticut River.

Historically used for industry, the river has in recent years had hiking trails and linear parks developed along its banks. The banks of the river are slowly being cleaned up after years of pollution and dumping.

== See also ==
- List of rivers of Connecticut
