= Charles Ethan Porter =

American artist (1847–1923)

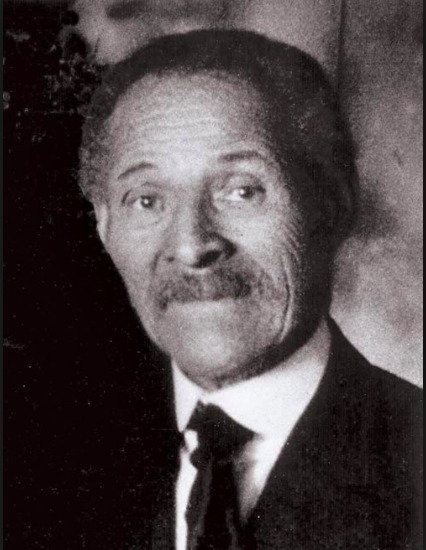
- Born: 1847; Hartford, Connecticut
- Died: March 6, 1923
- Education: National Academy of Design; Ecole des Arts Decoratifs
- Occupation: Visual artist
- Known for: Still life painting
- Notable work: Untitled (Cracked Watermelon), Metropolitan Museum of Art

Charles Ethan Porter (1847 – March 6, 1923) was an American painter who specialized in still life painting. A student at the National Academy of Design in New York City, he was one of the first African Americans to exhibit there. He was the only African-American artist at the turn of that century who painted in still life and the first known professional Black artist to concentrate on still life.

== Early life and education ==
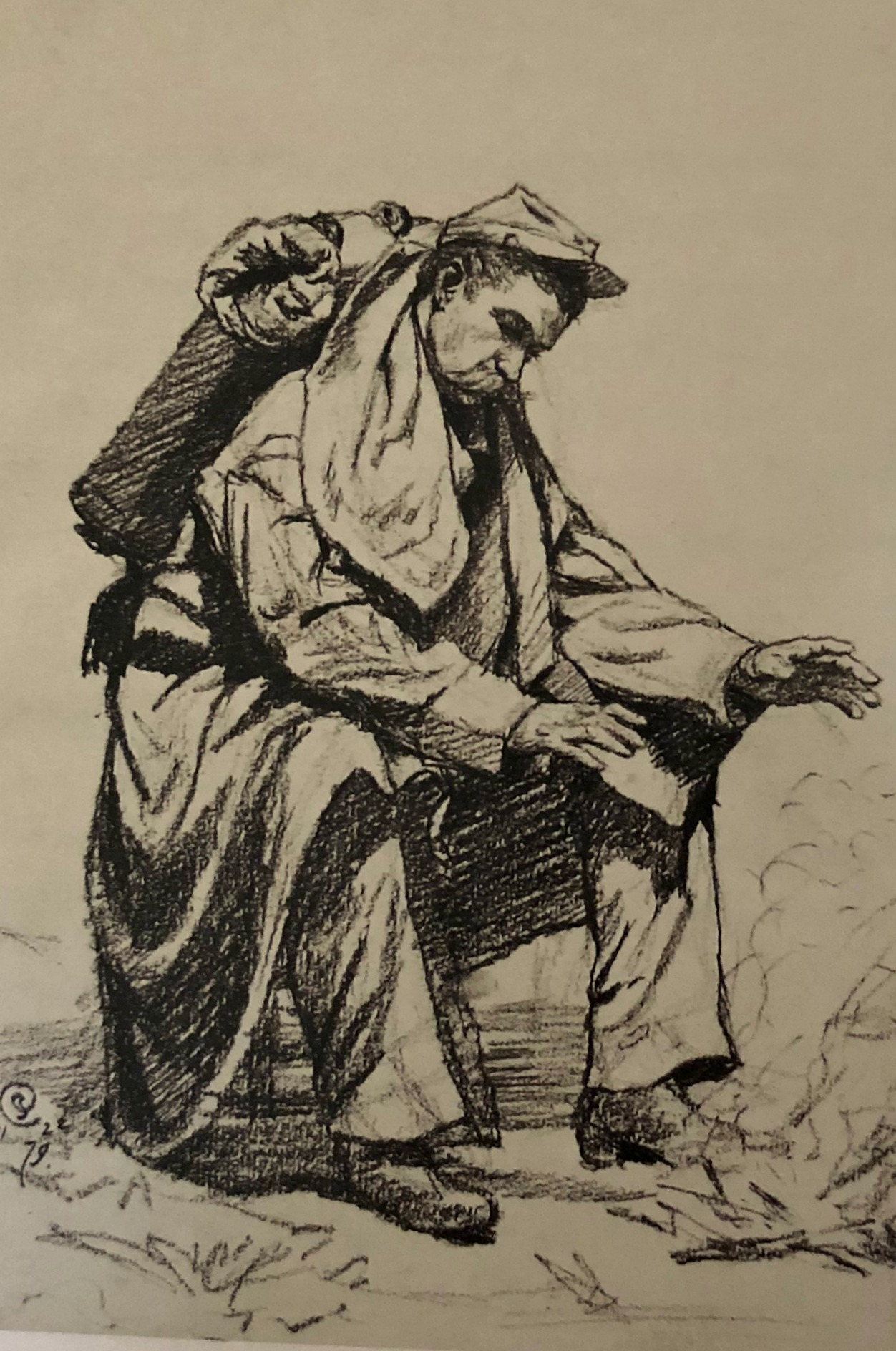
Civil war soldier, 1872

Porter was born most likely in 1847 in Hartford, Connecticut. (Note: Porter's birthdate has been cited by different sources as "1847", "1848" or "1849". On source uses Porter's brother Joseph's birthdate as Porter's. (Porter's mother, Mary Porter listed her son's birthdate as April 19, 1848 when she filled out an application for a War Department Parents pension (for Porter's brother). Porter's gravestone lists 1849 as his birth, his obituary indicates 1847 (listed age as 76). In 1881, in Paris, Porter signed a document listing his birth as 1847.) His father was possibly a mill worker and his mother worked as a servant. Porter's family moved to what was then the nearby village of Rockville (now part of Vernon, Connecticut) by the early 1850s. The family suffered many losses when Porter was young. They endured poverty and tragedy just a few years after moving to Rockville. Porter lost seven of his siblings to illness and one to war between 1858 and 1868.

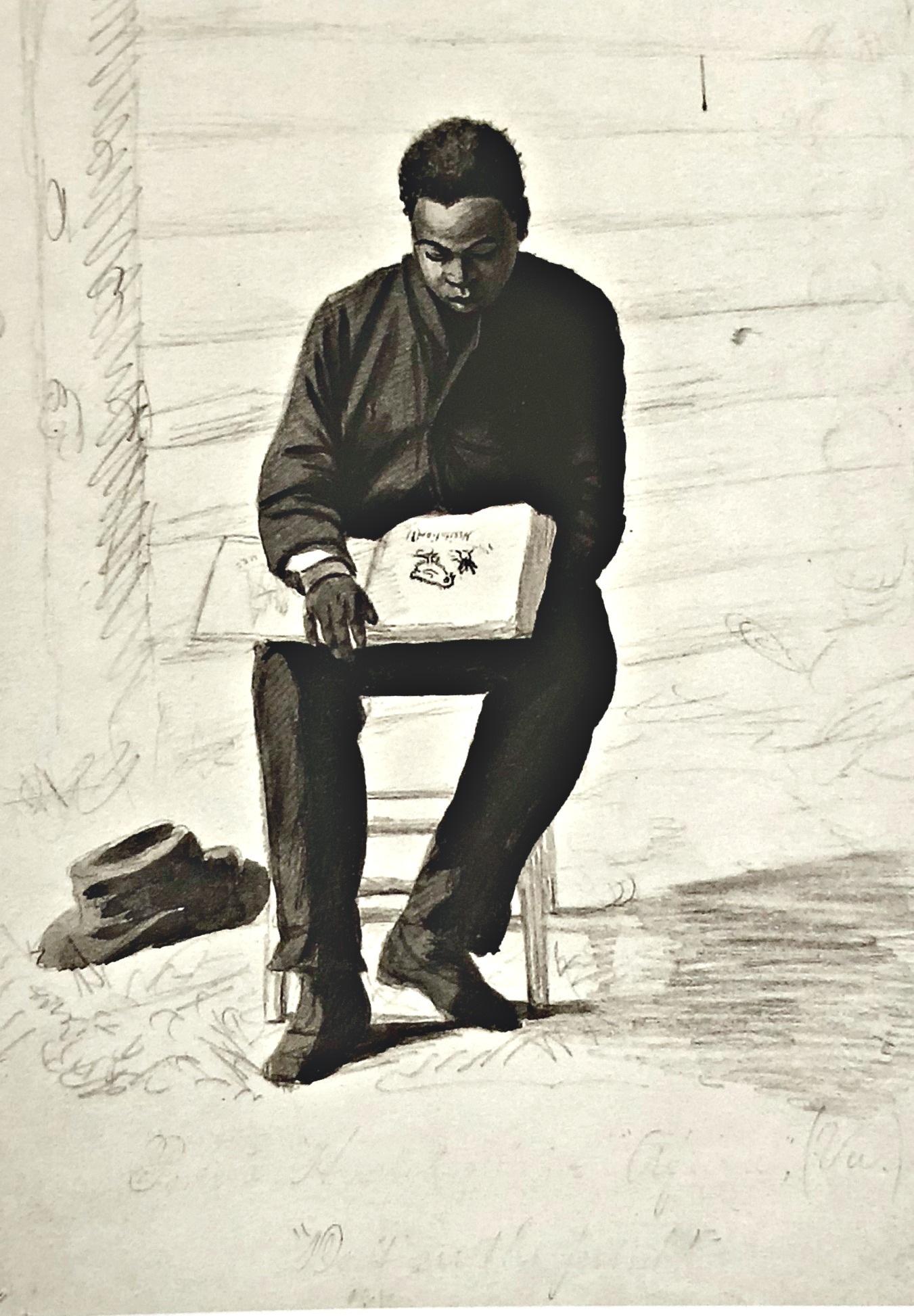
Boy and Book, c 1880

Porter's brothers, Joseph and William, enlisted in the Union Army in 1863. Joseph joined the 29th Connecticut Infantry Regiment (Colored) and William joined the 14th Rhode Island Heavy Artillery (Colored). Joseph was killed in Virginia in 1864, and was buried in Rockville just days before his regiment returned home. William became seriously ill with malaria and was granted a disability discharge in January 1865.

Porter was his family's first child to attend high school, graduating in 1865. Porter left Rockville in 1868 to study painting in Wilbraham, Massachusetts, a town twenty miles north of Rockville. At first people denied him, as he was black, but he got accepted at one point. In 1870, after two years of art study at Wesleyan Academy (now known as the Wilbraham & Monson Academy), Porter enrolled at the prestigious National Academy of Design in October 1869, becoming the first African-American admitted to the school.

Porter attended the art school until the spring of 1873. While at the school, and for the first time, Porter began exhibiting his work. A painting titled Autumn Leaves was shown in the school's summer exhibition. In May 1870, Porter was among eight art students whose drawings, as part of a large school exhibition, were given special mention in the New York Times. Porter received widespread praise and attention for his work during his four years at the National Academy, earning the support of prominent benefactors such as Frederic Edwin Church and famous author Mark Twain, who lived in Hartford.

== Career ==
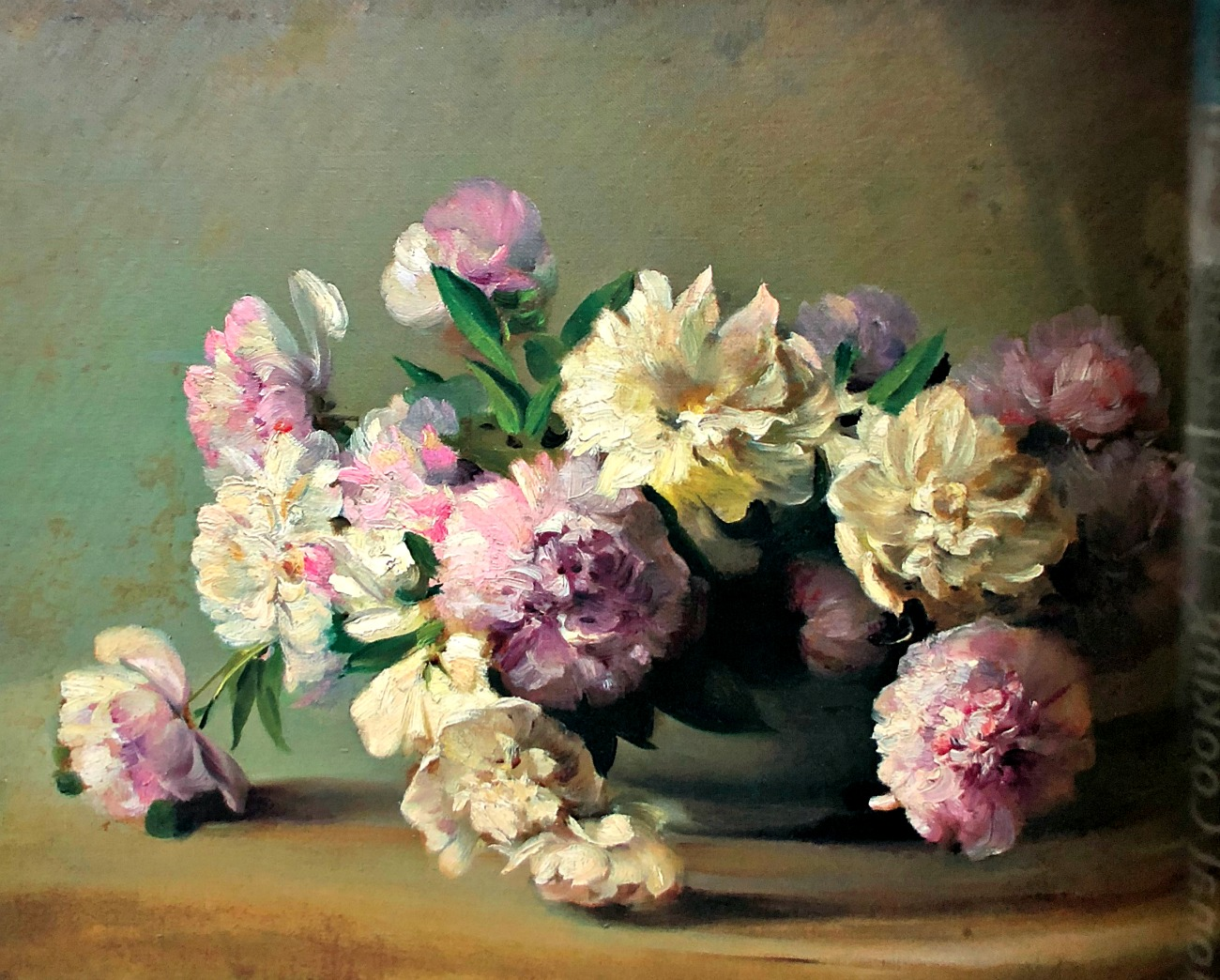
Peonies in a Bowl, 1885,

In the fall of 1873, Porter studied art with Joseph Oriel Eaton, a prominent portrait and landscape painter, for a year. Every year, he studied and painted in New York City from fall through spring but returned to Rockville in the summer to paint and teach art classes. From 1873 to 1875, Porter started to sell his work. One painting sold for $175, a high price for that time and for the artist's level of experience. Little else is known about Porter during this period. Art collectors were losing interest in American artists and traveling overseas, buying contemporary French art and Old Masters. Many young American artists, during the economic downturn, began studying overseas in the 1870s. Sales by American artists would not recover until the 1890s.

In 1878, Porter moved to Hartford, Connecticut and established a studio. The city was experiencing tremendous growth, and its wealthy citizens were interested in art and culture and had the money to begin or add to art collections. Porter's traditional academic art education made him a standout compared to the many self-taught artists who had recently moved to Hartford. He was one of the few artists at the time, and the only man, to specialize in still life painting. While in Hartford, Porter created many of the still life paintings that he is known for today. A number of his paintings of fruit were not typical of the period, as they did not include tableware, porcelain, and glassware and unusual touches such as insects. His apple paintings were a commercial success and he painted apples for much of his career.

Porter spent a good deal of time outdoors. He was very interested in nature, which is reflected in his paintings of butterflies, dead birds, insects, and plants. In 1879, his work gained the attention of influential landscape painter Frederic Edwin Church. Church visited Porter, purchased a few paintings, and declared Porter to "have no superior as a colorist in the United States." Church encouraged Porter to study and paint landscapes. In 1880, Porter visited the Adirondacks for two months of sketching and painting. He declared at the time that he would focus his work primarily on landscapes, except for commissioned still life paintings.

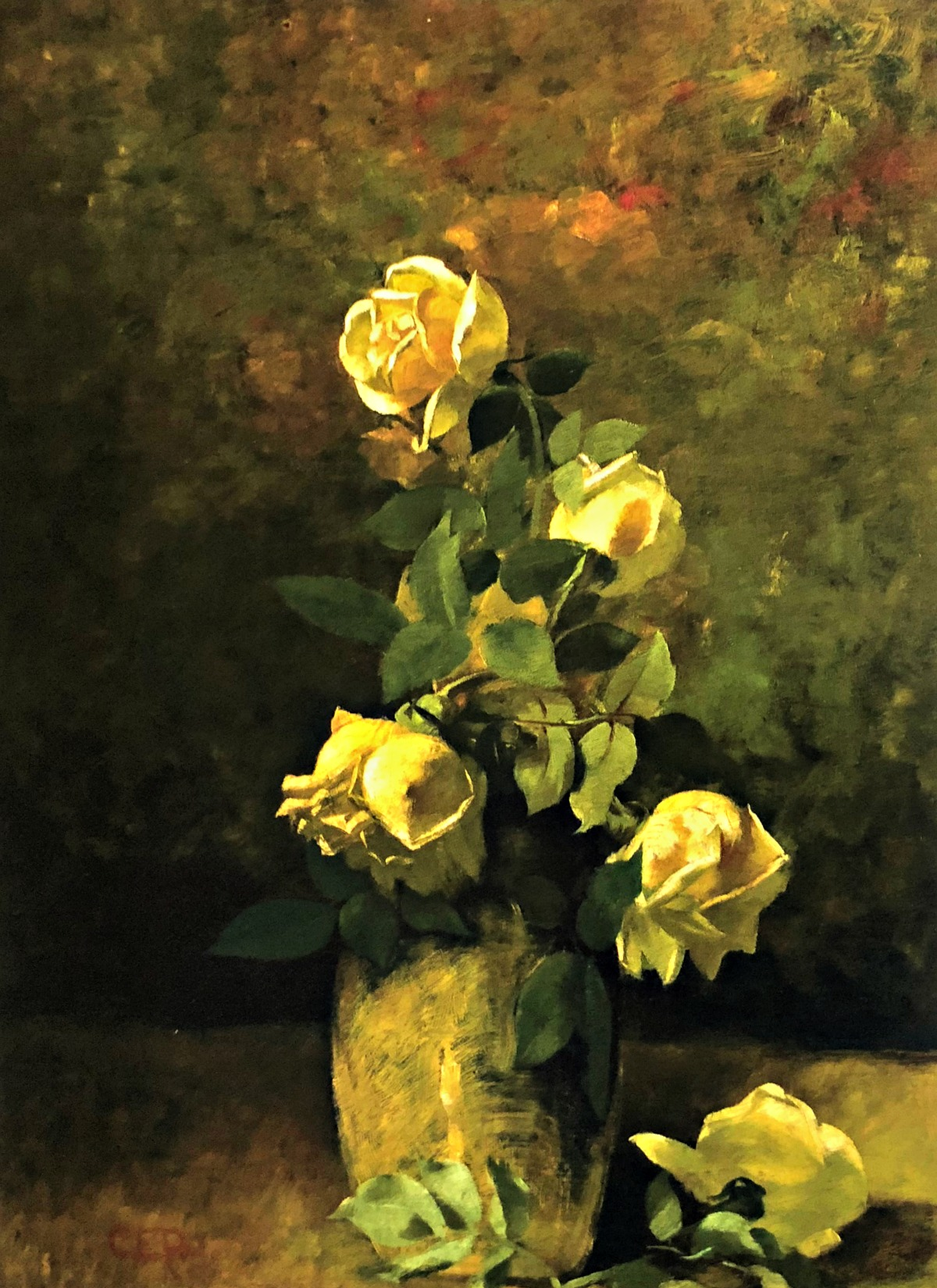
Yellow Roses in a Vase, 1890

On March 19, 1881, the Hartford Daily Courant reported that Porter was planning to move to Europe for two years to study art. The article stated that Porter would be selling at auction his entire inventory of paintings. Half of the paintings sold immediately for a total of $1062; additional sales resulted in a total of $1800. In early November 1881, Porter sailed for Liverpool. After an art tour of London, he traveled to Paris, with letters of introduction from Hartford's most prominent citizens, including Samuel Clemens, the author known as Mark Twain.

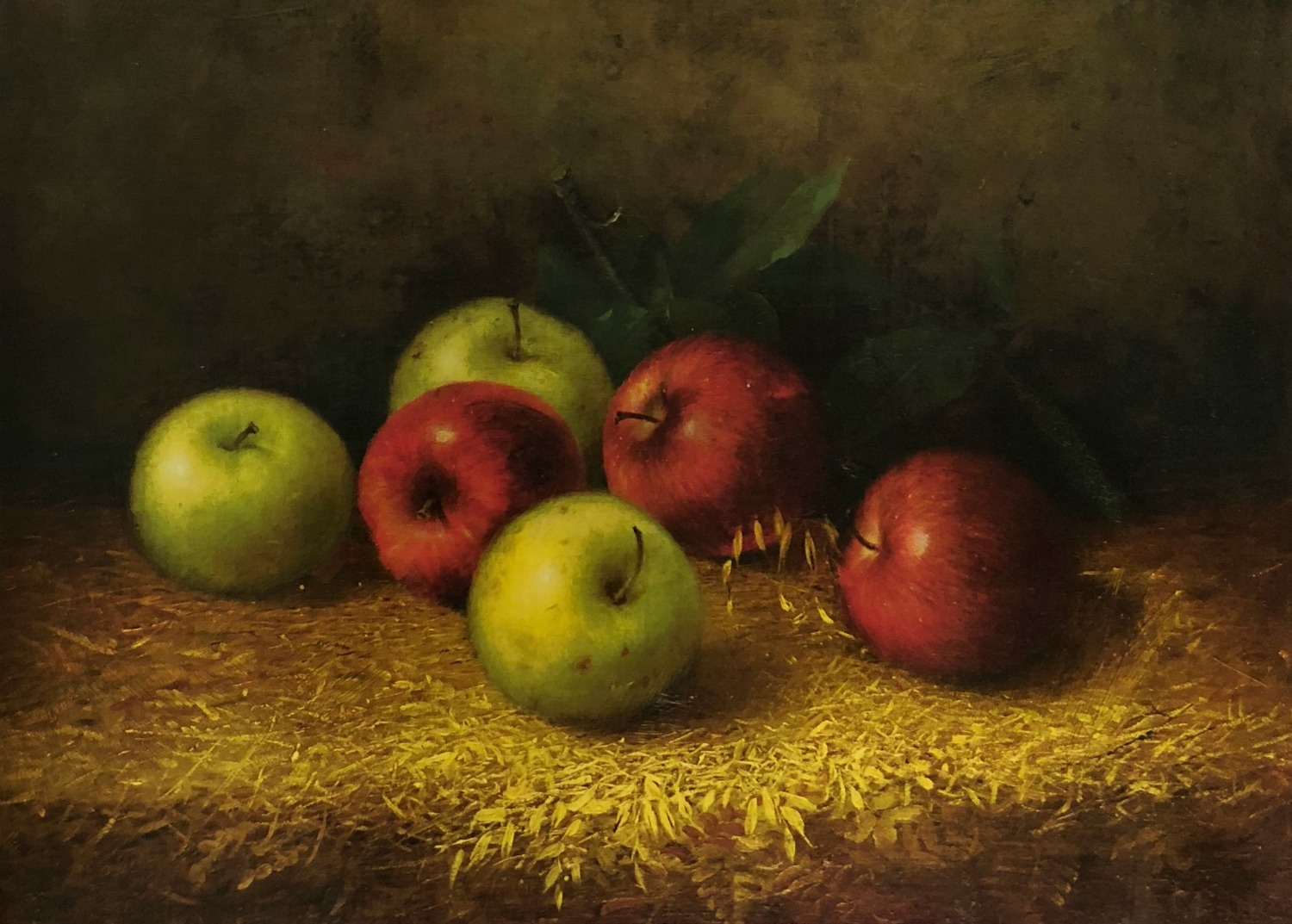
Apples on the ground, 1878

In Paris he studied the works of the influential artists of the Barbizon school of painting. He enrolled in the Ecole des Arts Decoratifs, where he studied until 1884, when he ran out of money and returned to Hartford. He struggled to blend into Parisian society as a Methodist and African-American. In December 1884, he hosted an art exhibition and auction of 100 paintings from his time in France. His new work was praised by the Hartford Evening Post, but the auction did not get the attendance or make the sales that Porter had hoped for.

In early 1885, Porter returned to New York City and opened a studio. He exhibited his work at the National Academy of Design and continued to paint. He spent the summer of 1885 in Rockville, Connecticut, teaching art and painting landscapes. By November 1886, Porter was back in Hartford again. He partnered with local artist Daniel Wentworth to hold auctions in 1887 and 1888, Wentworth contributing landscapes and Porter contributing primarily still lifes. The paintings sold for prices ranging from $6 to $100.

By 1889, Porter had left Hartford for the last time. He spent most of the year in New York City and summers in Rockville, Connecticut until 1897, when he settled permanently in Rockville. The quality of Porter's work declined after 1900 and interest in his work subsided. Porter died on March 6, 1923, at the age of 75.

== Legacy ==
Porter’s art began to regain interest among art historians and collectors in the 1980s. The first museum show featuring his work debuted in 2008, organized by the New Britain Museum of American Art, and his paintings have entered public collections including the Metropolitan Museum of Art, Smithsonian American Art Museum, Birmingham Museum of Art, San Antonio Museum of Art, Connecticut Museum of Culture and History, and Wadsworth Athenaeum.

== Image gallery ==
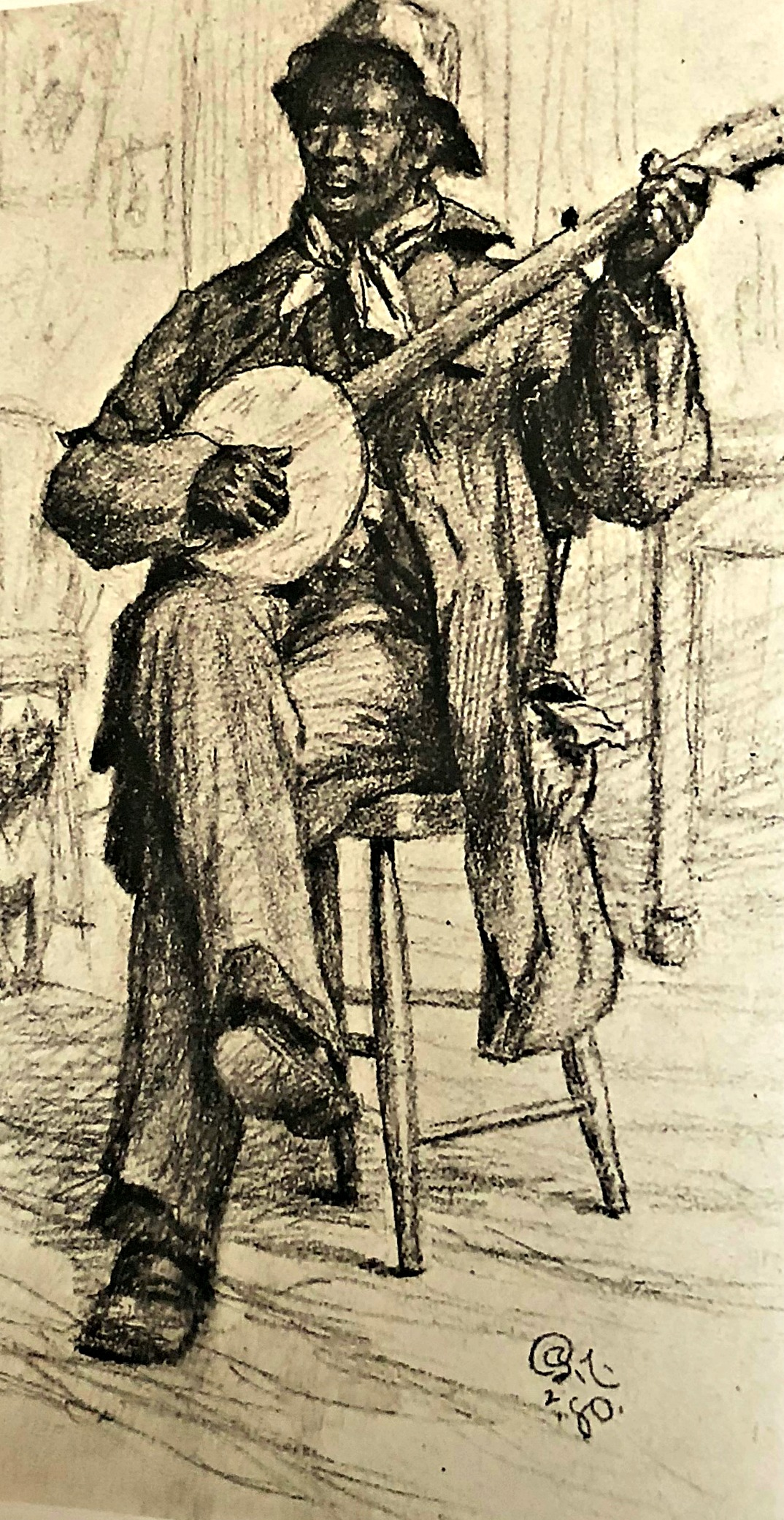
Banjo player, c 1880

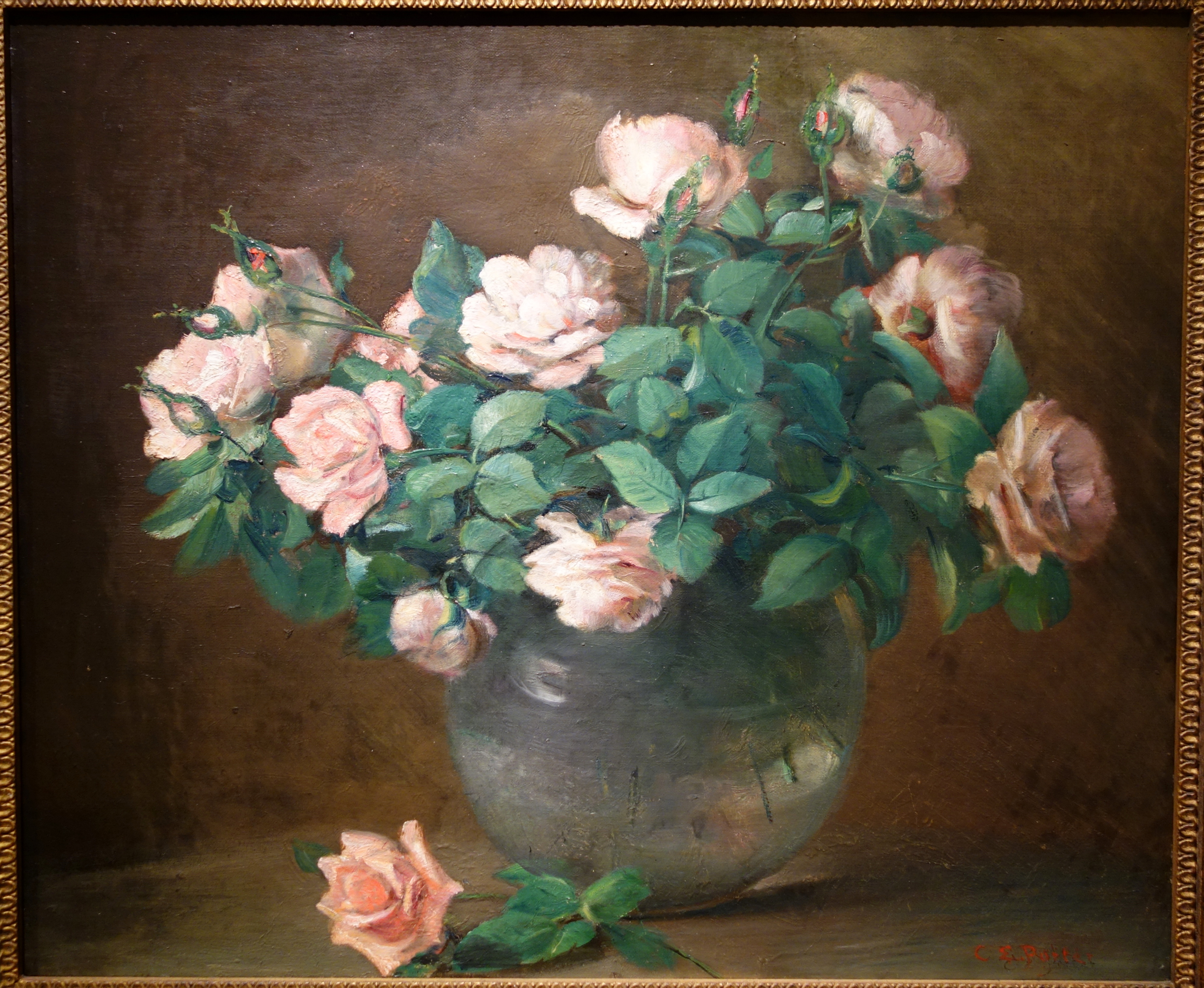
Roses, 1882

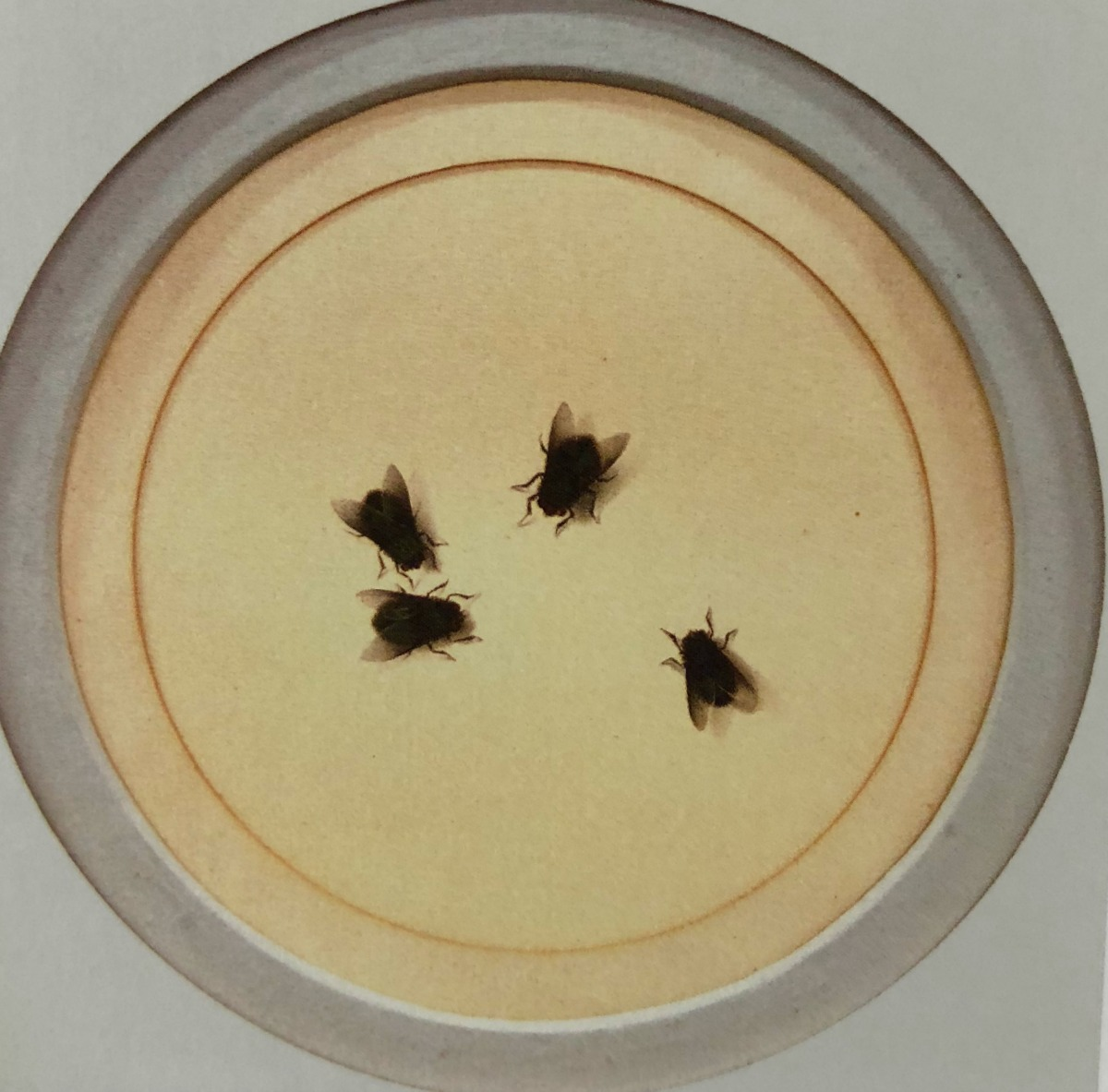
Flies on a Plate, 1878

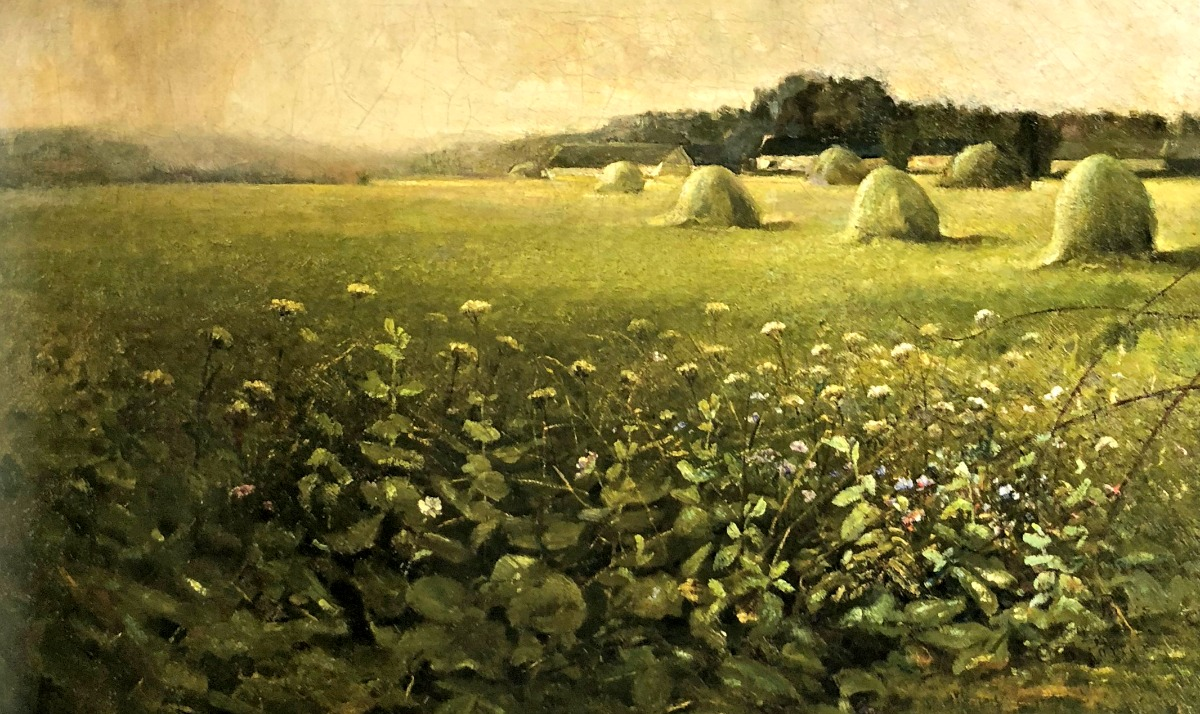
Landscape with Grain Stacks, c 1882

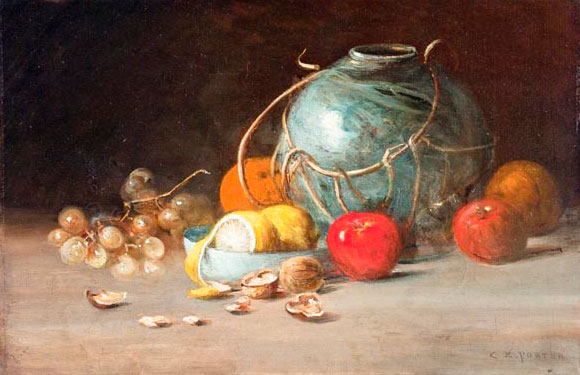
Still Life c. 1880

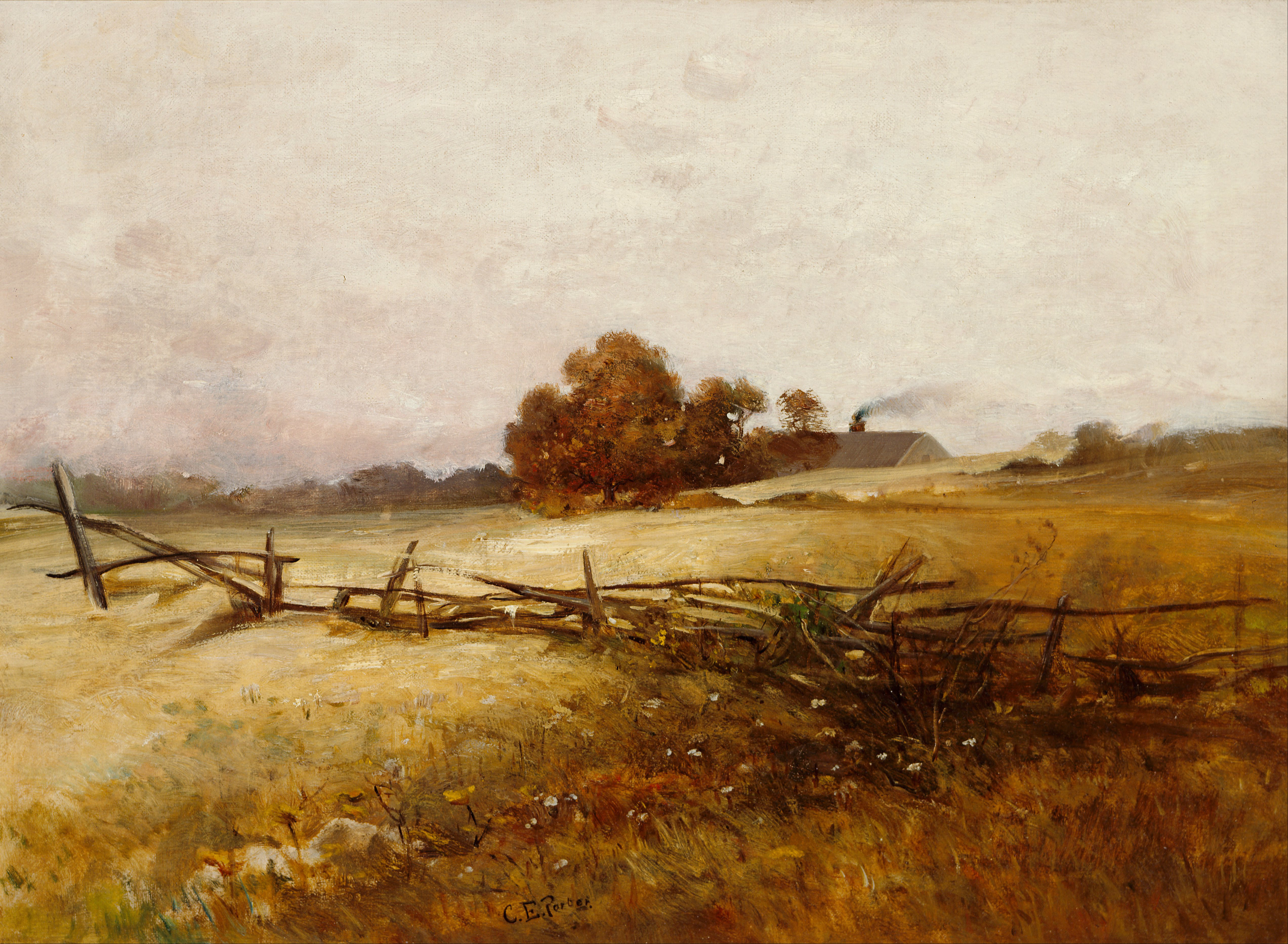
Autumn Landscape, c 1891

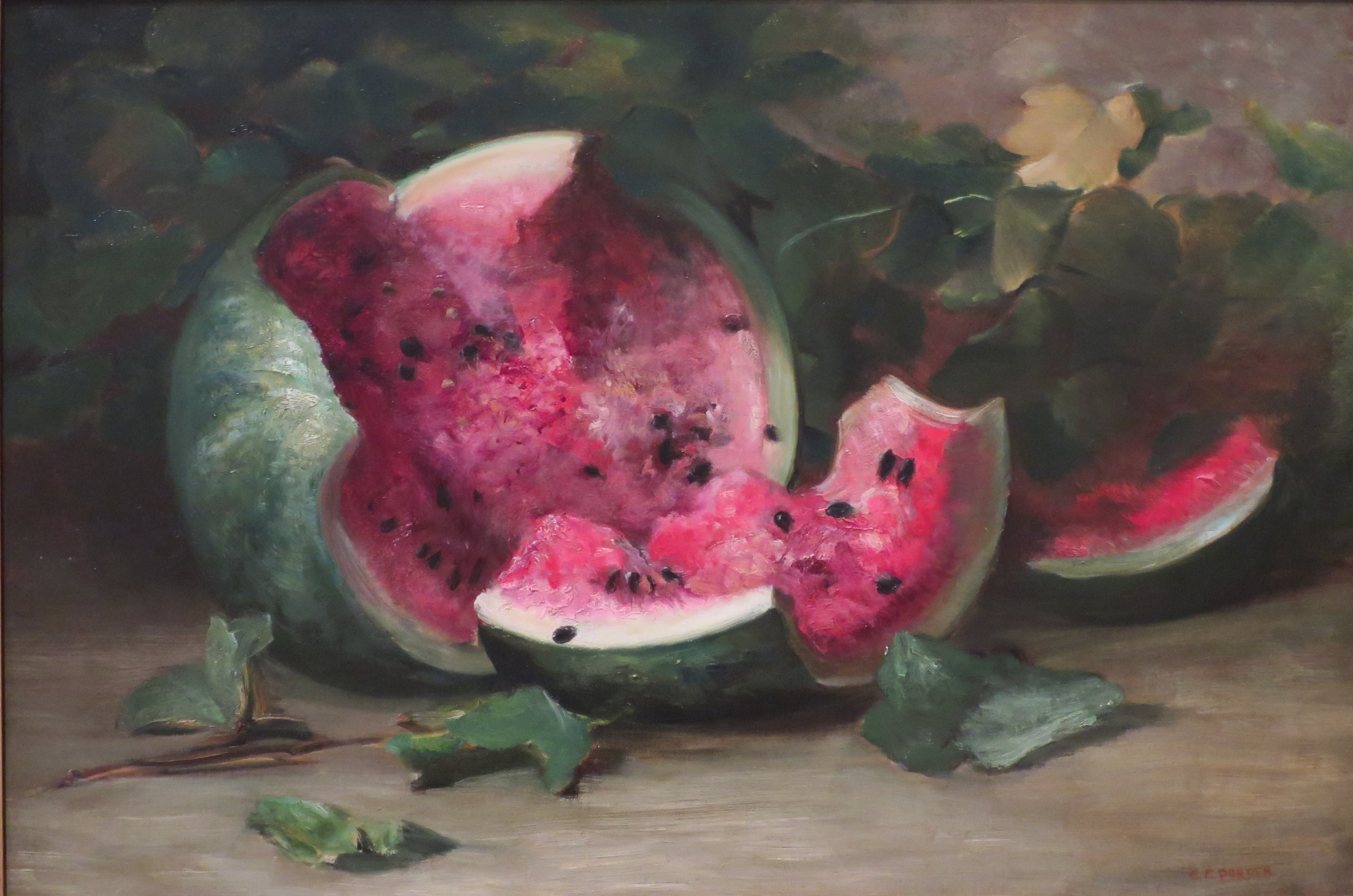
Untitled (Cracked Watermelon), 1890

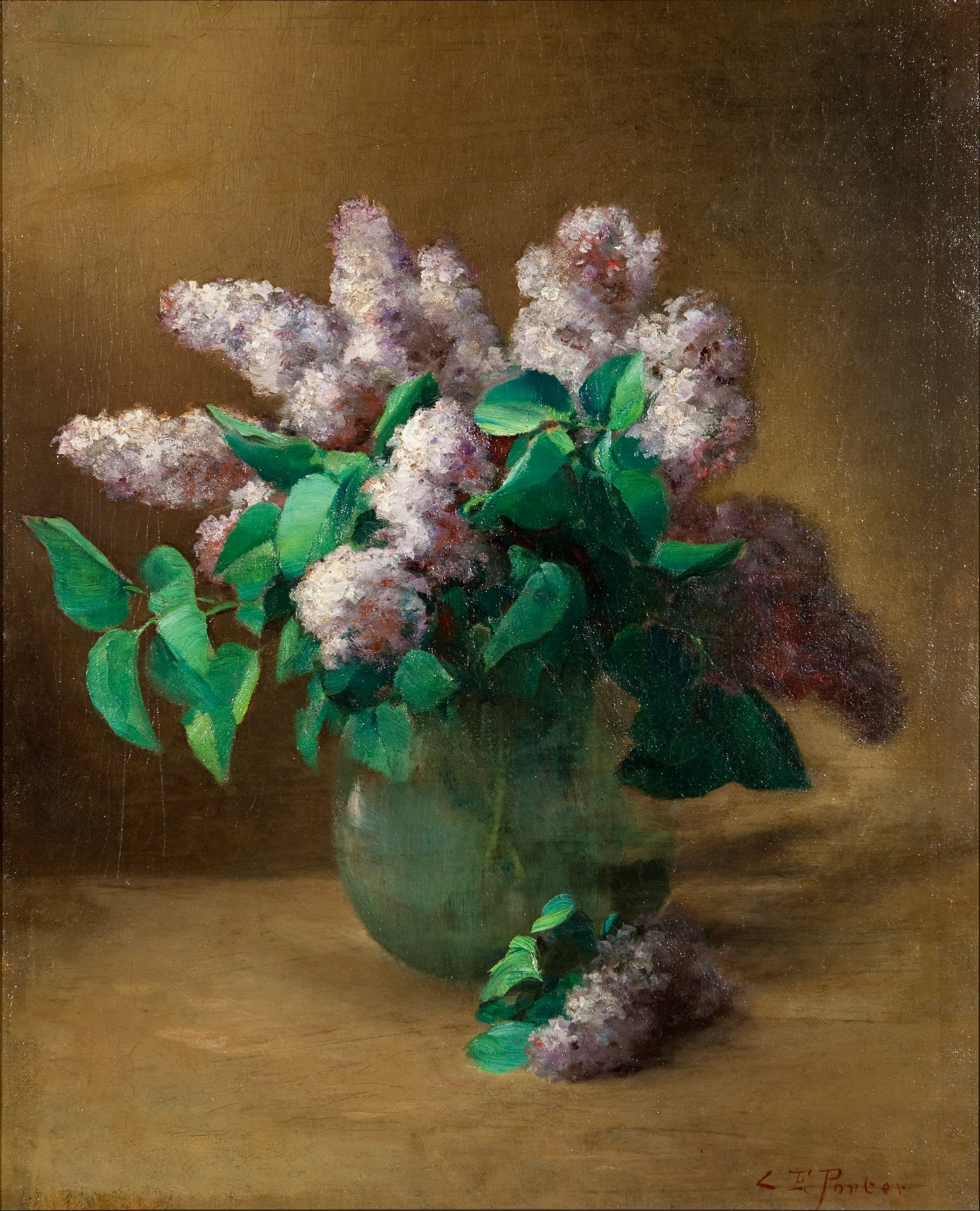
Lilacs, 1890

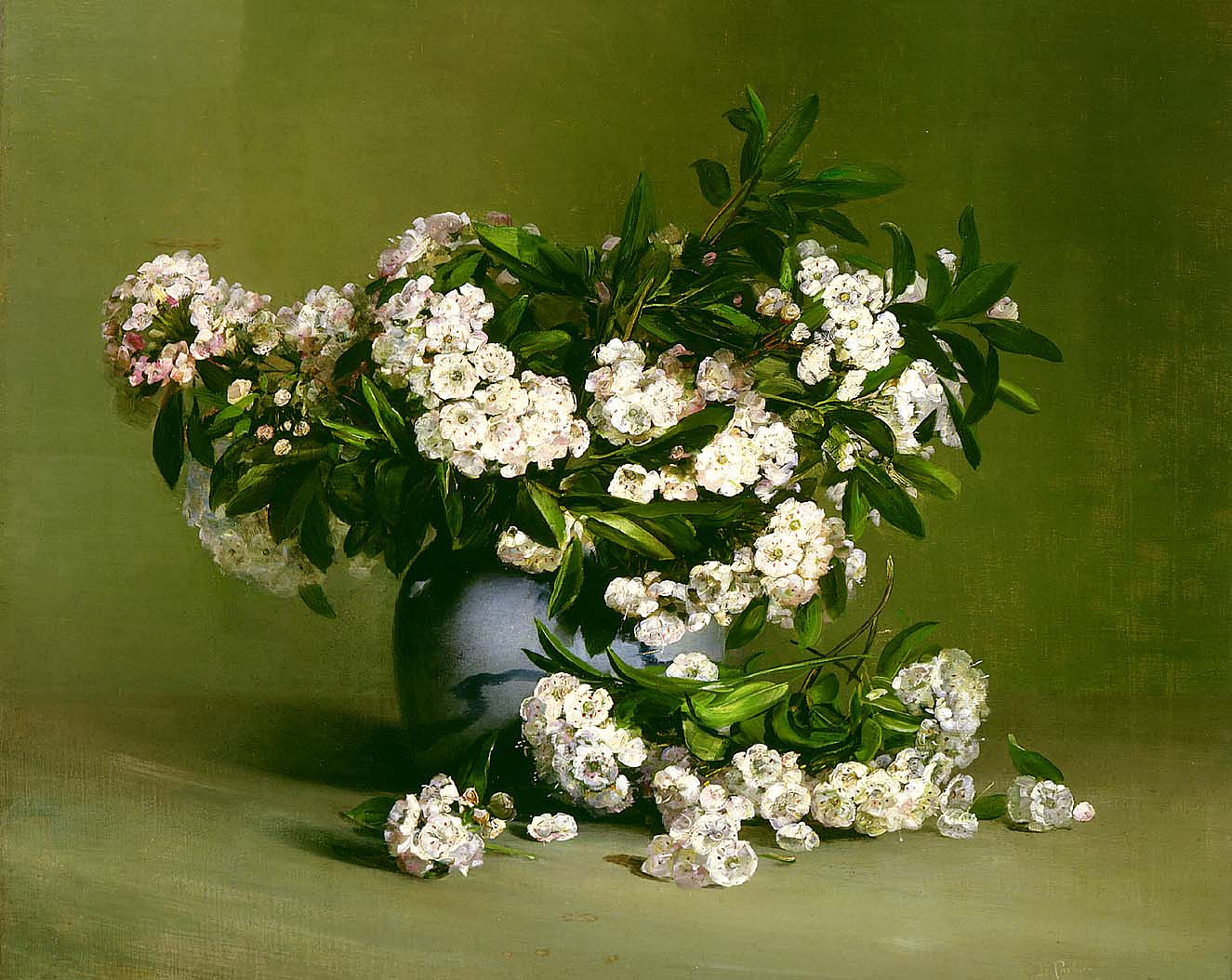
Mountain Laurel, 1888

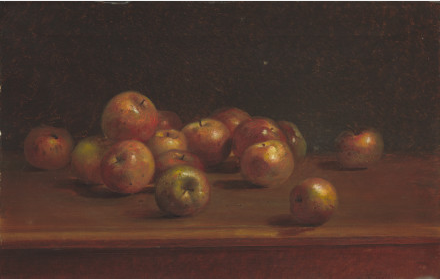
Still Life with Apples, 1886

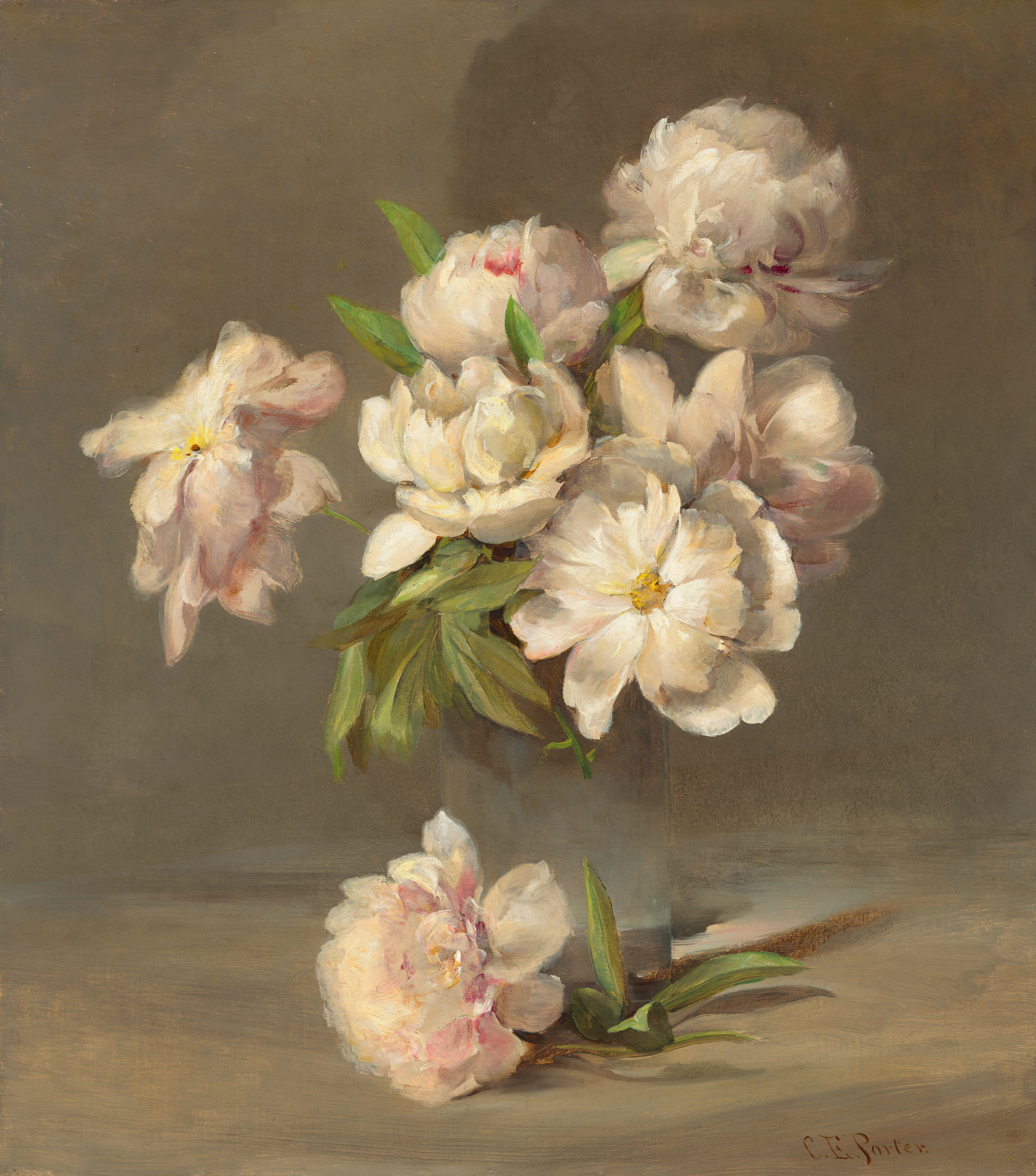
Peonies in a Vase, circa 1885
