= Rockville, Connecticut =

Census-designated place in Connecticut, United States

- Census-designated place
- Village of Rockville
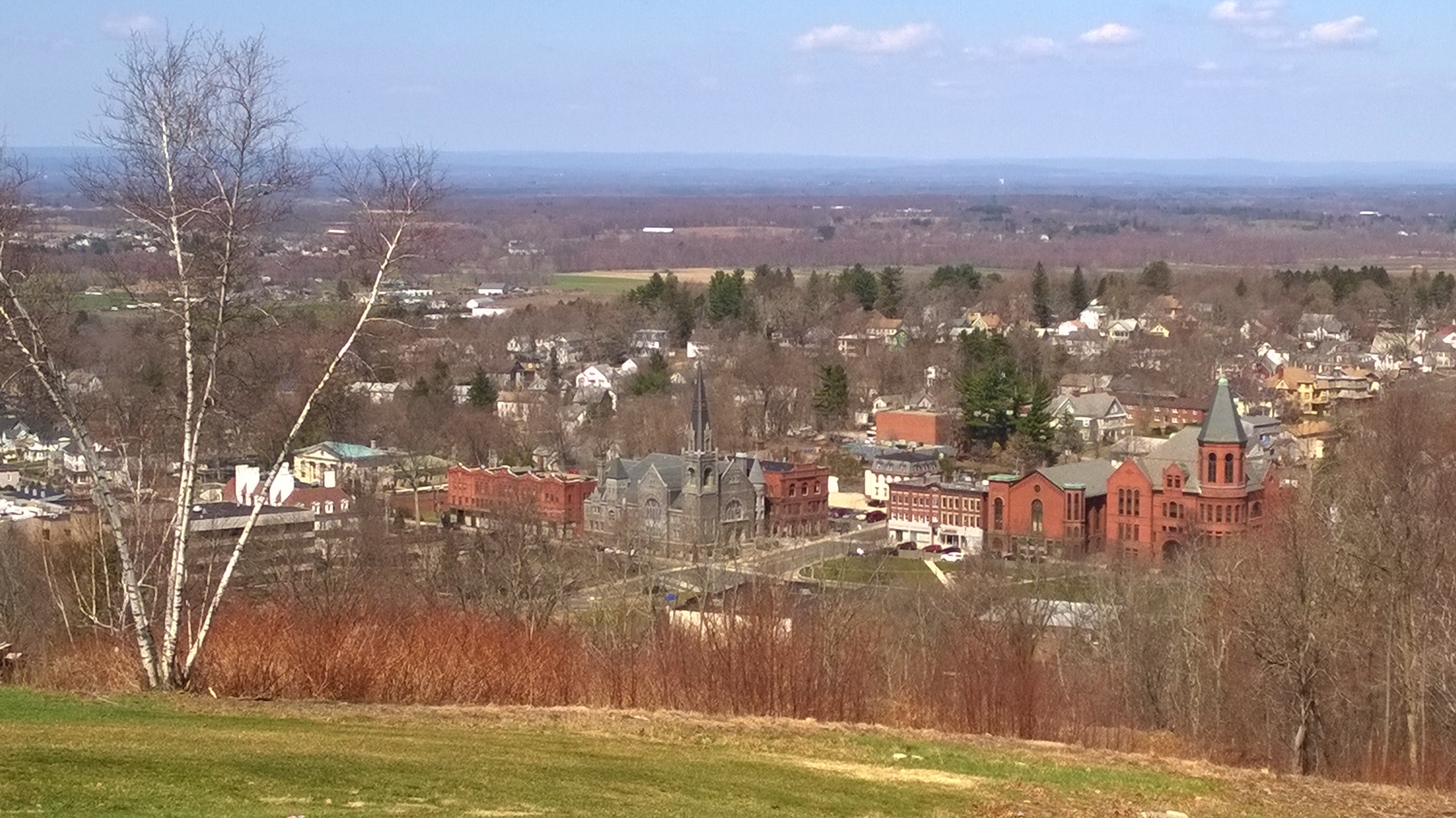
- Downtown Rockville from Fox Hill in 2015
- Etymology: "Going to the Rock"
- Location in Tolland County, then Tolland County's location in Connecticut
- Coordinates: 41.8673°N 72.4483°W
- Country: United States
- State: Connecticut
- County: Tolland
- Region: Capitol Planning
- Town: Vernon

Area
  - Total: 1.881 sq mi (4.87 km^{2})
  - Land: 1.826 sq mi (4.73 km^{2})
  - Water: 0.055 sq mi (0.14 km^{2})
- Elevation: 367 ft (112 m)

Population (2020)
  - Total: 7,920
  - Density: 4,337/sq mi (1,675/km^{2})
- Time zone: UTC-5 (Eastern Time Zone)
  - Summer (DST): UTC-4 (Eastern Daylight Time)
- Postal Code: 06066
- Area code: 860
- FIPS code: 09-65230
- GNIS feature ID: 2377857
- Rockville Historic District
- U.S. National Register of Historic Places
- U.S. Historic district
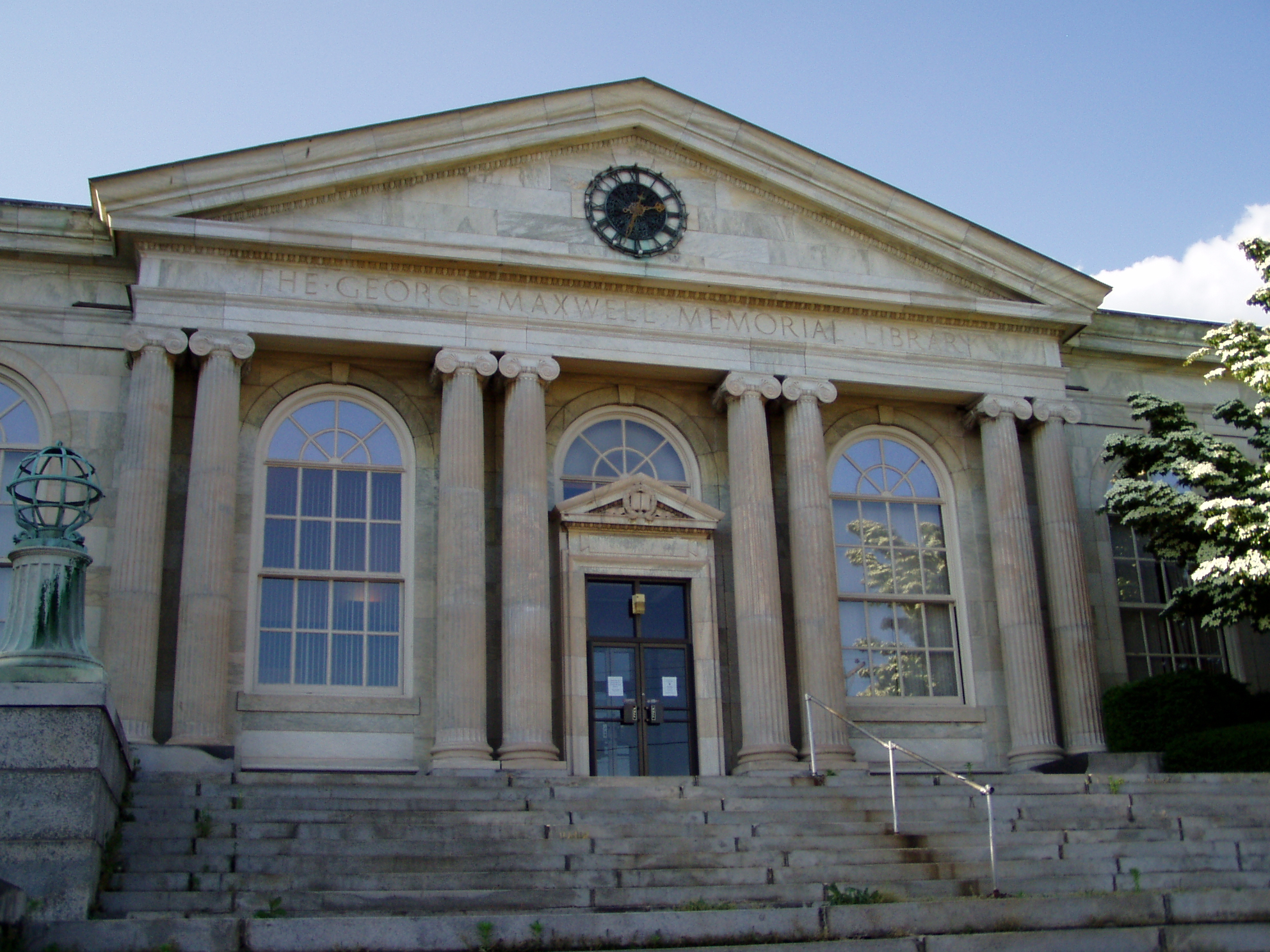
- George Maxwell Memorial Library, photograph from 2006

- Location within Connecticut Location within the United States
- Location: Roughly bounded by Snipsic Street, Davis Avenue, West and South Streets, Rockville, Connecticut
- Coordinates: 41°51′51″N 72°27′4″W
- Area: 550 acres (220 ha)
- Architect: Platt, Charles A. et al
- Architectural style: Greek Revival, Late Victorian, Classical Revival
- NRHP reference No.: 84001173
- Added to NRHP: September 13, 1984
- Website: rockvillect.org

Rockville is a census-designated place and a village of the town of Vernon in Tolland County, Connecticut, United States. The village is part of the Capitol Planning Region. The population was 7,920 at the 2020 census. Incorporated as a city in 1889, it has been consolidated with the town of Vernon since 1965.

== Geography ==
According to the United States Census Bureau, the CDP has a total area of 1.881 square miles (4.87 km^{2}), of which 1.826 square miles (4.73 km^{2}) is land and 0.055 square miles (0.14 km^{2}) (2.9%) is water.

== History ==
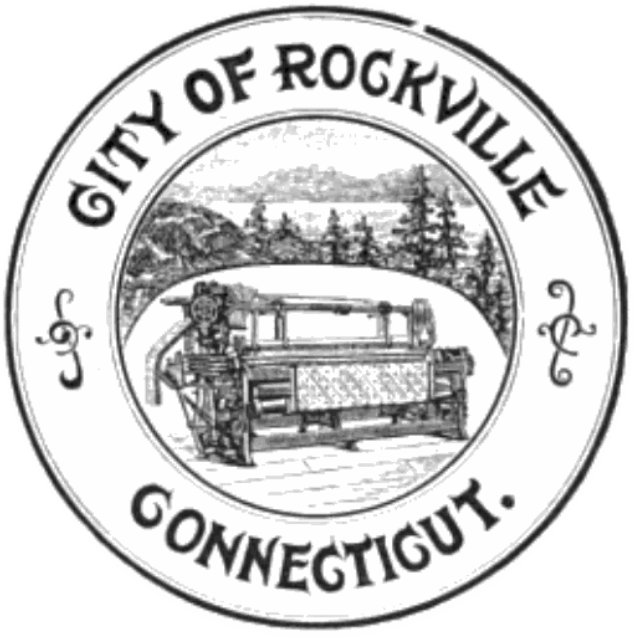
Old municipal seal of Rockville, when it was classified as a city.

=== Early settlement ===
In 1726, Samuel Grant traded his farm in Bolton for 500 acres (2.0 km^{2}) in the northern part of Bolton. This included the area which is now known as "Rockville" and for about the next century it was a nameless village. A prominent feature of the area is the Shenipsit Lake, or "The Snip" as it is currently affectionately called by the residents. The Snip feeds the Hockanum River which cascades 254 feet over 1.5 miles (2.4 km). The river was used by the farmers for a grist mill, a saw mill, an oil mill and even a distillery starting c. 1740.

=== Rock Mill ===
In 1821, Colonel Francis McLean built the first textile mill in what is now Rockville in partnership with George and Allyn Kellogg and Ralph Talcott, next to a spot known as "the Rock" with capital of $16,000. Francis McLean had partnered previously with some others in the Warburton Mill in Talcottville. "The Rock" was a natural dam of solid stone that made a high falls on the Hockanum River. In what is now the center of Rockville, he dammed up the Hockanum River and built a water-powered mill known as the "Rock Mill", which was possibly also known as the McLean Woolen Factory. By 1823 his mill was in full operation. The new mill was 80 by 30 feet, and its product was blue and blue-mix satinet. In 1826 power looms were introduced.

The mill attracted people to this area and by 1836 the population grew to 440 consisting of 61 families including 89 children under the age of 10.

=== Name ===
Mail service was brought once a day by stagecoach from Vernon Center, which was the post office and place for voting for the town. In 1837, according to old records, "an amateurish notice was posted on the Rock Mill announcing a public meeting in the lecture room of the village to decide in a democratic way the most suitable name for the vicinity". In order to have their own post office the town needed a permanent name.

- The following were some of the recommendations for naming the town.
  - Frankfort – in honor of Francis Mclean builder of the "Rock Mill"
  - Vernon Falls
  - Grantville – in honor of Samuel Grant the first settler
  - Hillborough – because the terrain is so hilly

Simon Chapman, who ran a boarding house for mill workers, submitted the name "Rockville" as common expression understood by the surrounding areas was "Going to the Rock". Thus, Rockville became the official name. It was not until 1842, however, that Rockville actually acquired its own post office.

== Rockville Historic District ==
Most of Rockville has been designated as part of the Rockville Historic District. The district is roughly bounded by Shenipsit Street, Davis Avenue, West Street and South Street was added in 1984 to the National Register of Historic Places. The district includes 842 buildings and one other structure. It includes examples of Greek Revival, Late Victorian, and Classical Revival architecture. The historic district includes 842 buildings and one other structure over 550 acres (2.2 km^{2}).

The Kellogg House had been used by the State Department of Children and Families to house troubled youth under a contract with Community Solutions, Inc. This arrangement ended on May 2, 2006, after a long history of documented mismanagement by both agencies. The facility is now used for adult transitional housing.

Elm Street, Park Street, and one block of Prospect Street surround a small town park named Talcott Park. The houses represent a variety of Victorian architectural styles ranging from early nineteenth century Greek Revival through the Gothic Revival and Italianate styles down to the Victorian eclecticism of the 1880s and 1890s. The mill owners usually built their houses in the downtown area.

The surviving buildings grouped around Central Park are a continuing reminder of the wealth brought by the woolen industry and the town's aspirations to be a leading city in the state during the 19th century.

On or about November 1, 2007, the light fixtures that sat beside the library steps were stolen. Both fixtures were made of copper shaped into globes. They weighed over one hundred pounds each and were installed as part of the original construction.

Buildings of architectural or historic interest in Rockville include:

- St. Bernard Church
- Memorial Building housing currently the New England Civil War Museum and the Grand Army of the Republic Hall as well as the town offices for Vernon.
- Old Rockville High School and East School
- (#10 and #12) Ellington Avenue
- Francis T. Maxwell House also known as Maxwell Court
- Rockville National Bank
- Union Congregational Church
- Citizen's Block
- Rockville Methodist Episcopal Church
- Memorial Building
- Fitch Block
- George Maxwell Memorial Library
- Kellogg House
- Turn Halle
- Erhardt Linck's Hall
- 70 Village Street
- George Sykes House (first)
- Hockanum Mill
- Saxony Mill
- Springville Mill
- Florence Mill
- Henry Huhnken's Saloon
- New England Yard
- Castle Sunset
- The Tower on Fox Hill
- Baptist Church, since destroyed to make room for a bigger parking lot for Rockville General Hospital.
- Maple Street School

=== Gallery ===
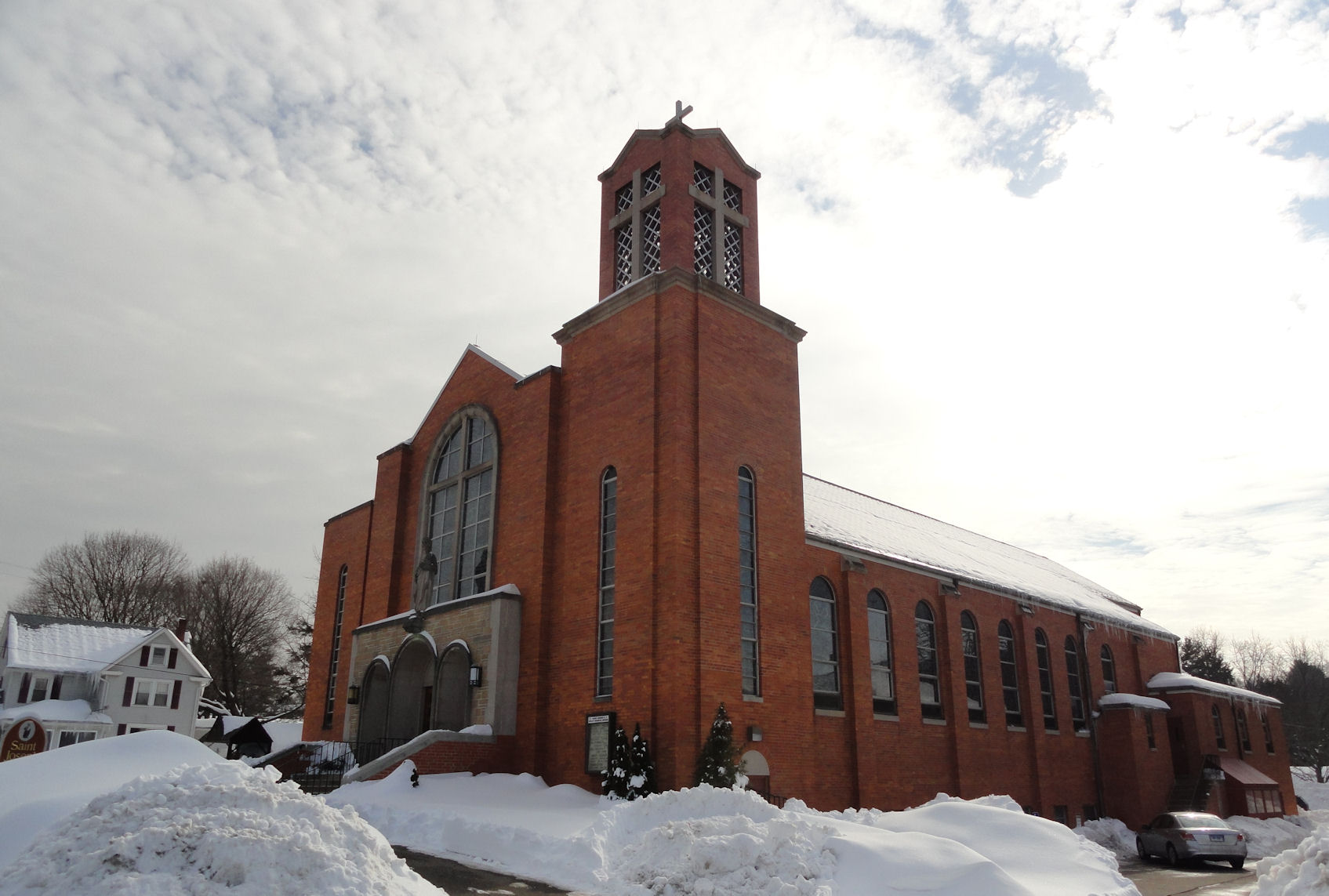
St. Joseph's Church in downtown.

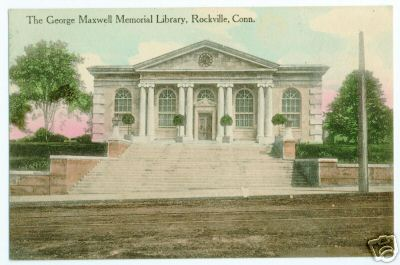
George Maxwell Memorial Library, postcard mailed in 1911.

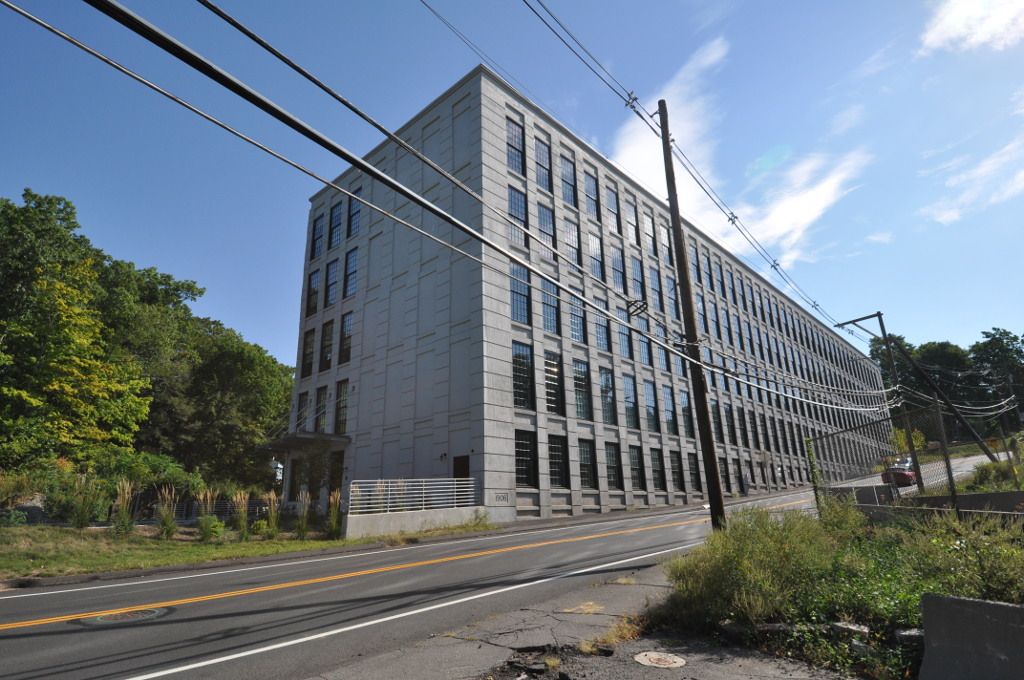
Minterburn Mill after becoming an apartment complex.

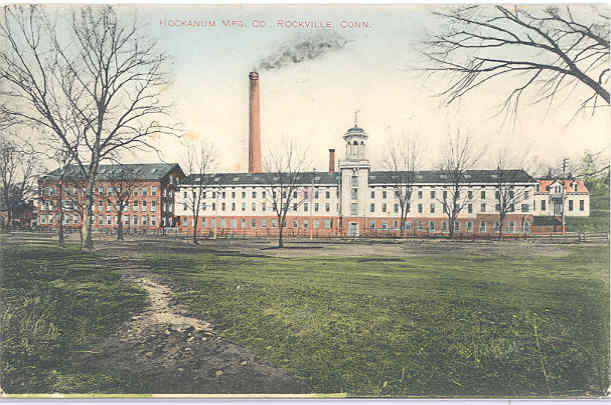
Hockanum Manufacturing Co., c. 1909.

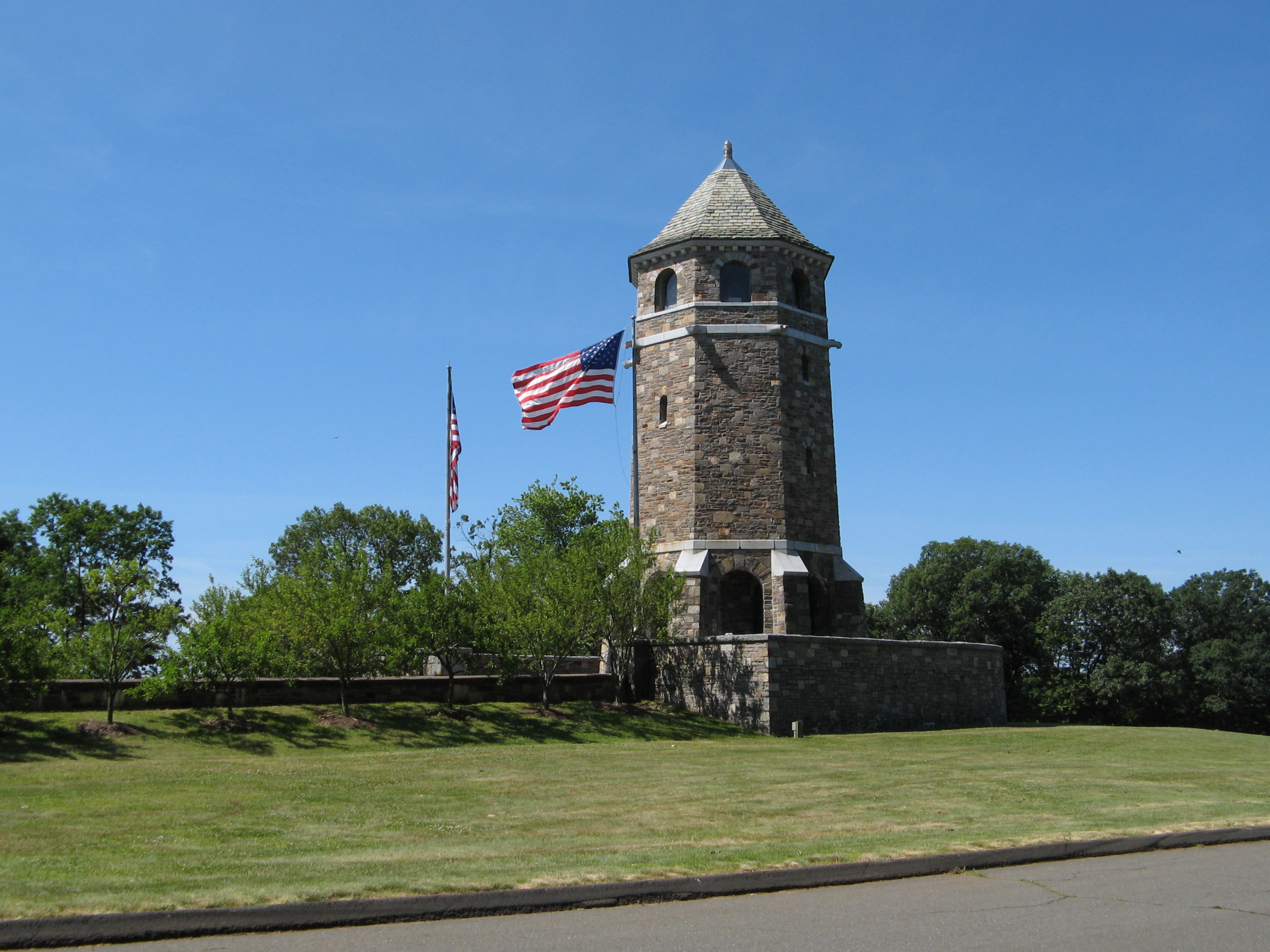
The Tower on Fox Hill, the village's highest peak.

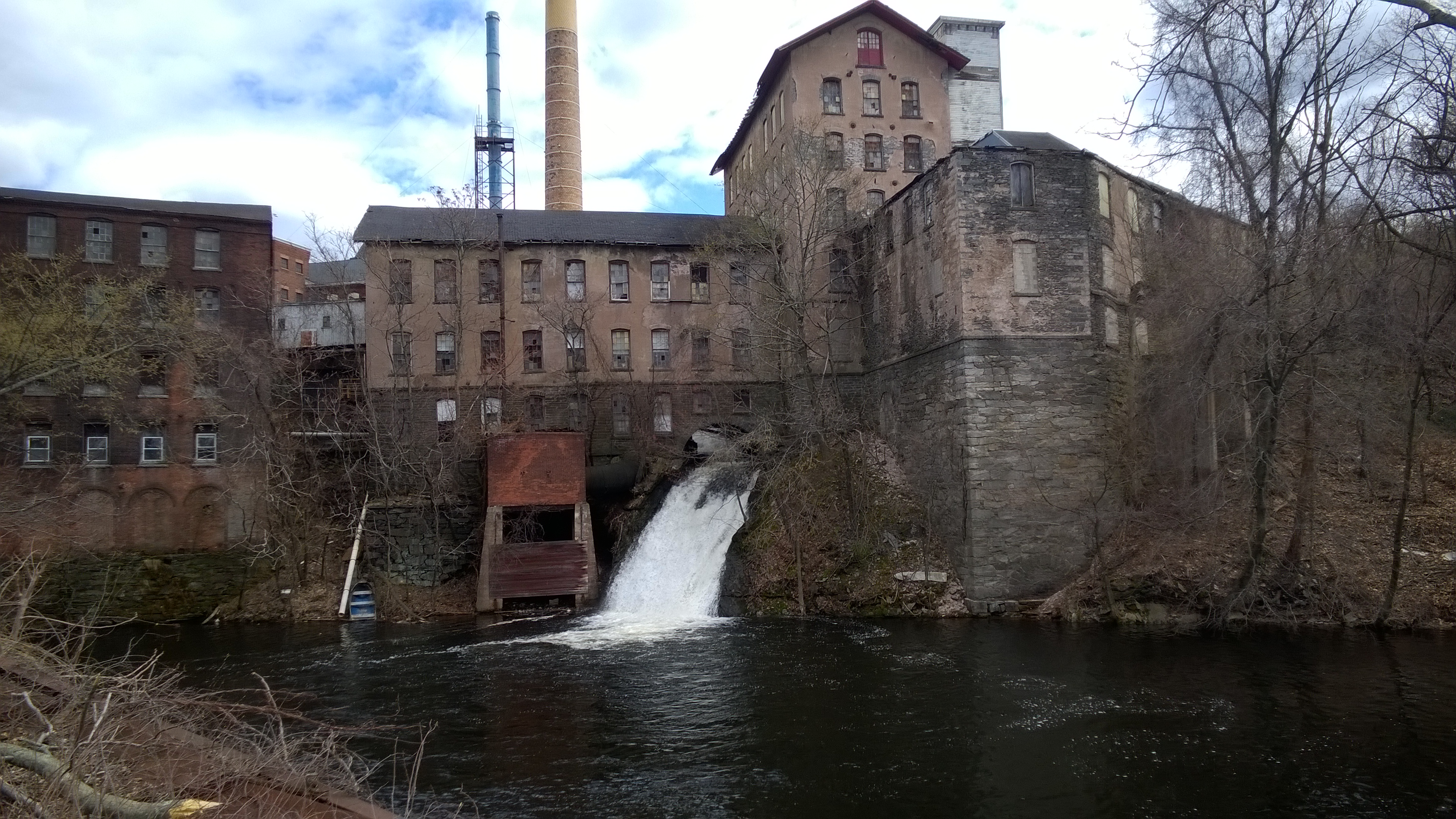
The Hockanum Mill today.

== Demographics ==
=== 2020 census ===
As of the 2020 census, Rockville had a population of 7,920. The median age was 35.4 years. 22.0% of residents were under the age of 18 and 13.5% of residents were 65 years of age or older. For every 100 females there were 93.4 males, and for every 100 females age 18 and over there were 92.4 males age 18 and over.

99.7% of residents lived in urban areas, while 0.3% lived in rural areas.

There were 3,588 households in Rockville, of which 27.2% had children under the age of 18 living in them. Of all households, 23.7% were married-couple households, 27.8% were households with a male householder and no spouse or partner present, and 37.4% were households with a female householder and no spouse or partner present. About 42.8% of all households were made up of individuals and 14.1% had someone living alone who was 65 years of age or older.

There were 3,971 housing units, of which 9.6% were vacant. The homeowner vacancy rate was 1.2% and the rental vacancy rate was 5.4%.

Racial composition as of the 2020 census
| Race | Number | Percent |
|---|---|---|
| White | 5,056 | 63.8% |
| Black or African American | 1,056 | 13.3% |
| American Indian and Alaska Native | 32 | 0.4% |
| Asian | 309 | 3.9% |
| Native Hawaiian and Other Pacific Islander | 9 | 0.1% |
| Some other race | 501 | 6.3% |
| Two or more races | 957 | 12.1% |
| Hispanic or Latino (of any race) | 1,407 | 17.8% |

=== 2010 census ===
As of the 2010 census, there were 7,474 people, 3,292 households, and 1,681 families residing in the CDP. The population density was 4,419.9 inhabitants per square mile (1,706.5/km^{2}). There were 3,682 housing units at an average density of 1,947.9 per square mile (752.1/km^{2}). The racial makeup of the CDP was 76.0% White (70.8% non-Hispanic white), 11.7% African American, 0.4% Native American, 3.3% Asian, 0.1% Pacific Islander, 4.5% from other races, and 4.1% from two or more races. Hispanic or Latino of any race were 12.2% of the population.

There were 3,292 households, out of which 26.8% had children under the age of 18 living with them, 25.6% were married couples living together, 19.6% had a female householder with no husband present, and 48.9% were non-families. 39.2% of all households were made up of individuals, and 14.0% had someone living alone who was 65 years of age or older. The average household size was 2.24 and the average family size was 2.98.

In the CDP, the population was spread out, with 26.5% under the age of 20, 17.8% from 20 to 29, 19.8% from 30 to 44, 23.9% from 45 to 64, and 12.1% who were 65 years of age or older. The median age was 33.7 years. For every 100 females, there were 90.9 males. For every 100 females age 18 and over, there were 87.7 males.

=== Income and poverty ===
The median income for a household in the CDP was $40,451, and the median income for a family was $40,714. Males working year-round and full-time had a median income of $48,159 versus $37,865 for females. The per capita income for the CDP was $23,079. About 24.5% of families and 22.6% of the population were below the poverty line, including 37.1% of those under age 18 and 16.0% of those age 65 or over.

== Notable people ==
- Jahine Arnold (born 1973), NFL wide receiver
- Stephen Farrell (1863–1933), world champion sprinter and track coach
- Stephanie A. Gallagher (born 1972), United States District Judge
- Alice Belle Garrigus (1858–1949), Evangelist & Founder-Pentecostal Assemblies of Newfoundland & Labrador, Born in Rockville
- William Churchill Hammond (1860–1949), organist and music educator, born in Rockville.
- William George Allen (1861–1928), creator and first patent owner of "Allen Wrench/Key"-style tool, as well as founder of "Allen" brand (and accompanying manufacturing company) and a World War I veteran, initially born in Rockville, died in Hartford at the age of 67.
- Edward Stevens Henry (1836–1921), U.S. Congressman
- Morgan Lewis (1906–1968), songwriter and Broadway theatre composer
- Dwight Loomis (1821–1903), U.S. Congressman
- Dwight Marcy (1840–1887), Connecticut State Representative
- Mary Mattingly (born 1979), visual artist
- Ralph Murphy (1895–1967), film director
- Stuart J. Murphy (born 1942), children's book author
- Kenneth North (1930–2010), U.S. Air Force brigadier general
- Bob Pease (1940–2011), analog integrated circuit design expert and technical author
- Charles Phelps (1852–1940), lawyer, state legislator, and Connecticut's first attorney general
- Gene Pitney (1940–2006), internationally known singer/songwriter, member of Rock & Roll Hall of Fame, born in Hartford, raised in Rockville
- Charles Ethan Porter (1847–1923), artist
- Bill Romanowski (1966–present), NFL linebacker, born in Vernon, graduated from Rockville High School in 1984
- Antoni Sadlak (1908–1969), U.S. Congressman

== See also ==
- National Register of Historic Places listings in Tolland County, Connecticut
