= St. Bernard Church (Rockville, Connecticut) =

Historic church in Connecticut, United States

Coordinates: 41°52′04.55″N 72°26′45.27″W

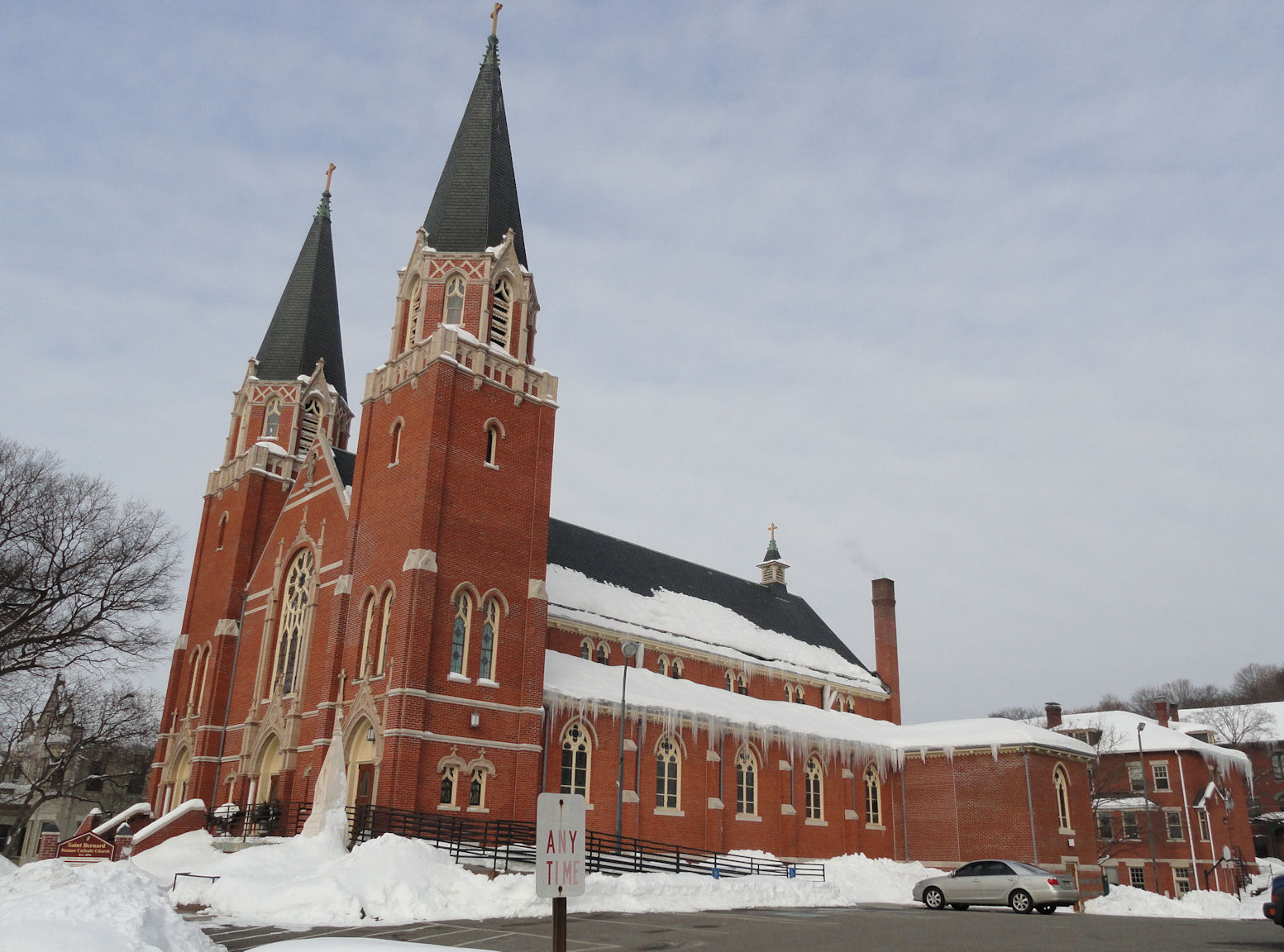
- St. Bernard Church, January 2011
- St. Bernard Church
- Location: 25 St. Bernard Terrace; Rockville, Connecticut
- Country: United States
- Denomination: Roman Catholic

History
- Founded: 1854
- Dedicated: September 20, 1908

Architecture
- Architect: Joseph A. Jackson

Administration
- Province: Hartford
- Diocese: Norwich

Clergy
- Bishop: Most Rev. Michael R. Cote
- Priest(s): Reverend Steve Gulino, Reverend Alexander Pandolfe
- Pastor: Reverend Richard Ricard

St.Bernard is a Roman Catholic church in Rockville, Connecticut, part of the Diocese of Norwich.

== History ==
In 1848, 15 Catholic residents of Rockville met in a house owned by the Paper Mill Company to celebrate the first Mass.

By 1853, the influx of Catholic residents was such that the group needed a larger facility. Skinner Hall located over the meat market on Market Street became the last place to attend Mass before congregation acquired the present site. In 1854, the Parish of St. Bernard was established with Rev. Peter Egan as the pastor and by 1856 the first church had been completed.

In 1904, the church was destroyed in a disastrous fire and the congregation used the Town Hall as a temporary place of worship while the new church was under construction.

The cornerstone of the present St. Bernard's Church was laid during a ceremony five months after the fire. Shortly thereafter the chapel in the basement was dedicated and used for Mass and other services until the upper church was completed. The new church was dedicated on September 20, 1908.

== Buildings ==
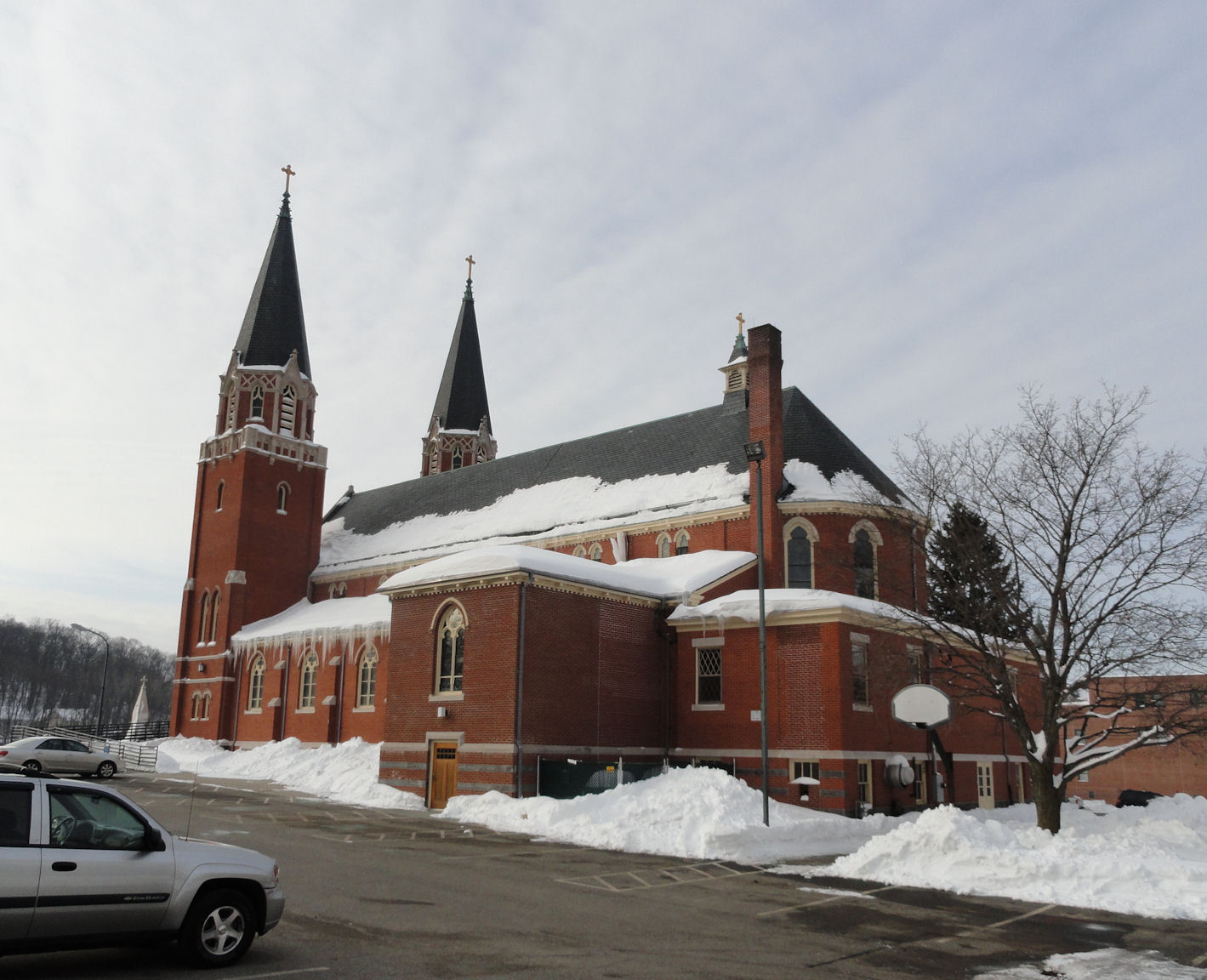
St. Bernard Church, Rockville Connecticut as seen from behind

The 1908 Gothic Revival church building was designed by noted church architect Joseph A. Jackson of New York City. Jackson had designed the parish school in 1895. The parish convent was designed by the firm of Whiton & McMahon of Hartford, Connecticut. All three buildings are listed as significant contributing properties of the City of Rockville Historic District.

== Music ==
St. Bernard Church contains one of the earliest Austin organs, Opus 205, with two manuals and eight ranks. The instrument deteriorated over time and in 2008 it gave way to a digital instrument built by the Rodgers Organ Company of Hillsboro, Oregon. The pipes from the original Austin organ have been retained and it is hoped that at some future time the new organ can be configured to make use of this historic instrument.
