= Vernon, Connecticut =

- Town
- Town of Vernon
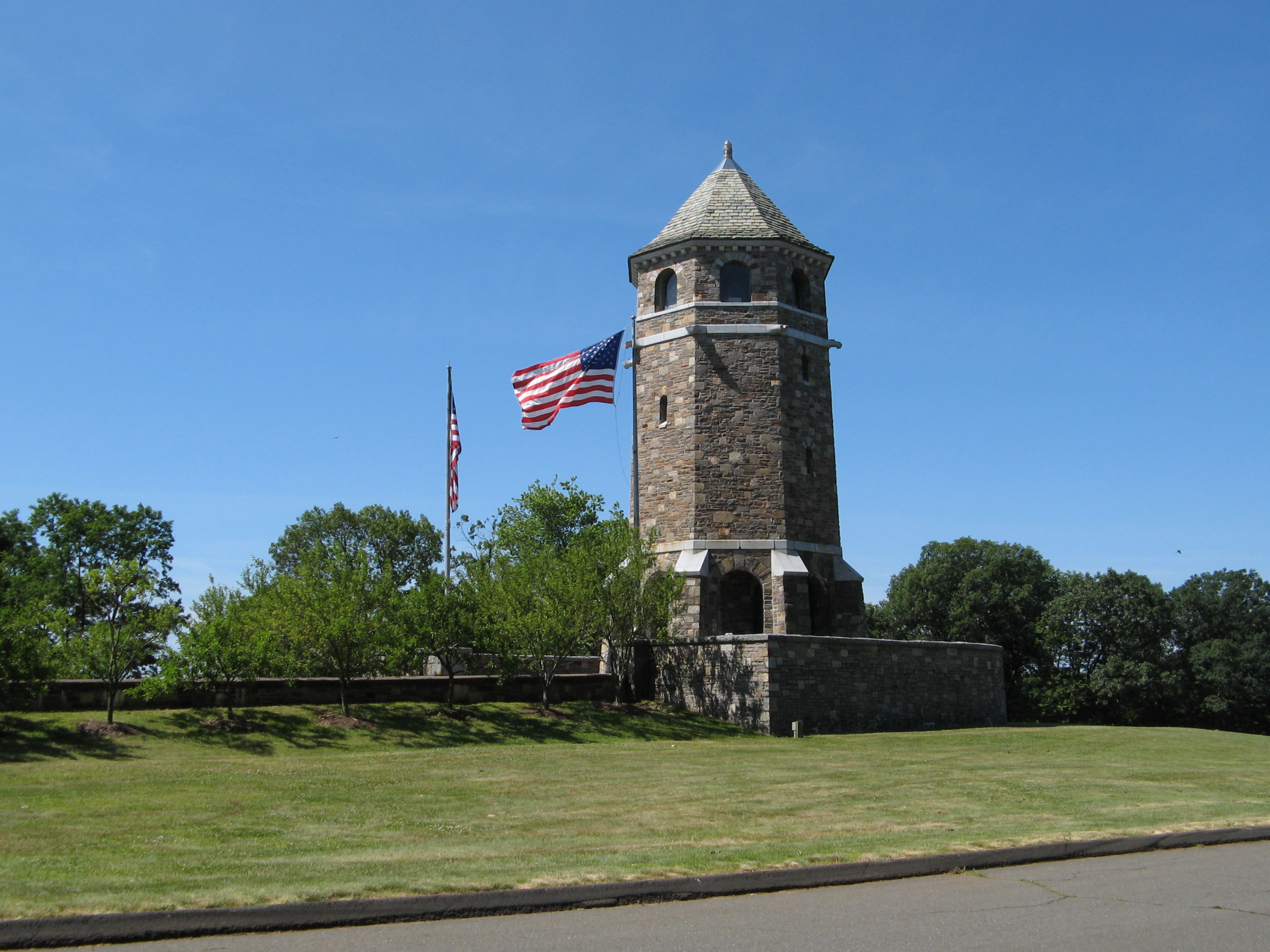
- The Tower on Fox Hill in Henry Park

- Flag Seal
- Motto: The Crossroads for Opportunity
- Coordinates: 41°50′13″N 72°27′38″W
- Country: United States
- U.S. state: Connecticut
- County: Tolland
- Region: Capitol Region
- Incorporated: 1808

Government
  - Type: Mayor-council
  - Mayor: Daniel A. Champagne

Area
  - Total: 18.1 sq mi (46.9 km^{2})
  - Land: 17.7 sq mi (45.8 km^{2})
  - Water: 0.39 sq mi (1.0 km^{2})
- Elevation: 390 ft (119 m)

Population (2020)
  - Total: 30,215
  - Density: 1,709/sq mi (659.7/km^{2})
- Time zone: UTC−5 (EST)
  - Summer (DST): UTC−4 (EDT)
- ZIP Code: 06066
- Area codes: 860/959
- FIPS code: 09-78250
- GNIS feature ID: 0213520
- Website: www.vernon-ct.gov

Vernon (/ˈvɜːrnɪn/ VER-nin) is the most populous town in Tolland County, Connecticut, United States. The town is part of the Capitol Planning Region. The population was 30,215 at the 2020 census. Vernon contains the smaller villages of Talcottville and Dobsonville, as well as the former City of Rockville.

== History ==
Vernon was incorporated in October 1808, from Bolton. Vernon was named after George Washington's Mount Vernon estate. Vernon contains the former city of Rockville, incorporated in January 1889 and consolidated in January 1965.

== Geography ==
According to the United States Census Bureau, the town has a total area of 18.1 square miles (47 km^{2}), of which 17.7 square miles (46 km^{2}) is land and 0.3 square miles (0.78 km^{2}) (1.88%) is water.

== Demographics ==
Historical population
Census	Pop.	Note	%±
1810	827		—
1820	966		16.8%
1830	1,164		20.5%
1840	1,430		22.9%
1850	2,900		102.8%
1860	3,838		32.3%
1870	5,446		41.9%
1880	6,915		27.0%
1890	8,808		27.4%
1900	8,483		−3.7%
1910	9,087		7.1%
1920	8,898		−2.1%
1930	8,703		−2.2%
1940	8,978		3.2%
1950	10,115		12.7%
1960	16,961		67.7%
1970	27,237		60.6%
1980	27,974		2.7%
1990	29,841		6.7%
2000	28,063		−6.0%
2010	29,179		4.0%
2020	30,215		3.6%
U.S. Decennial Census

At the 2000 census, there were 28,063 people, 12,269 households and 7,275 families living in the town. The population density was 1,582.8 inhabitants per square mile (611.1/km^{2}). There were 12,867 housing units at an average density of 725.7 per square mile (280.2/km^{2}). The racial makeup of the town was 89.95% White, 3.99% African American, 0.24% Native American, 2.65% Asian, 0.04% Pacific Islander, 1.22% from other races, and 1.91% from two or more races. Hispanic or Latino of any race were 3.58% of the population.

There were 12,269 households, out of which 26.5% had children under the age of 18 living with them, 45.3% were married couples living together, 10.5% had a female householder with no husband present, and 40.7% were non-families. Of all households, 33.0% were made up of individuals, and 10.6% had someone living alone who was 65 years of age or older. The average household size was 2.26 and the average family size was 2.90.

Of the population, 22.1% was under the age of 18, 7.7% from 18 to 24, 32.4% from 25 to 44, 23.9% from 45 to 64, and 13.9% who were 65 years of age or older. The median age was 38 years. For every 100 females there were 91.6 males. For every 100 females age 18 and over, there were 89.1 males.

The median income for a household in the town was $47,816, and the median income for a family was $59,599. Males had a median income of $43,620 versus $31,515 for females. The per capita income for the town was $25,150. About 4.1% of families and 5.9% of the population were below the poverty line, including 7.9% of those under age 18 and 6.1% of those age 65 or over.

== City of Rockville ==
Most of Rockville has been designated as part of the Rockville Historic District. The district is roughly bounded by Shenipsit Street, Davis Avenue, West Street and South Street was added in 1984 to the National Register of Historic Places. The district includes 842 buildings and one other structure. It includes examples of Greek Revival, Late Victorian, and Classical Revival architecture. The historic district includes 842 buildings and one other structure over 550 acres (2.2 km^{2}). The Population of this part of Vernon is 7,474.

Buildings of architectural or historic interest in Rockville include:

- St. Bernard Church
- Memorial Building housing the New England Civil War Museum and the Grand Army of the Republic Hall as well as the town offices for Vernon.
- Old Rockville High School and East School
- Saxony Mill
- Florence Mill
- The Tower on Fox Hill

== Education ==
=== Elementary schools ===
- Lake Street School
- Maple Street School
- Northeast School
- Center Road School
- Skinner Road School

=== Middle and secondary schools ===
- Vernon Center Middle School

=== Secondary schools ===
- Rockville High School

== Economy ==
Top employers in Vernon according to the town's 2023 Comprehensive Annual Financial Report

#	Employer	# of Employees
1	Town of Vernon	834
2	Rockville General Hospital	414
3	Visiting Nurses and Health Services	343
4	Stop & Shop	287
5	Vernon Manor	186
6	ShopRite	169
7	TJ Maxx & Home Goods	168
8	Fox Hill Nursing and Rehabilitation	157
9	Rein's Deli	132
10	State of Connecticut	123

== Emergency Services ==
=== Fire ===
Fire protection for the Town of Vernon is provided by the Town of Vernon Fire Department, formed in 1980 when the Vernon Fire District and the Rockville Fire Department merged. The Town of Vernon Fire Department (TVFD) is an all volunteer fire department that operates out of five fire stations as well as a Public Safety Building which houses EMS operations, department administration, the Office of Emergency and Risk Management, as well as the town's Emergency Operations Center.

The department operates five engine companies, one heavy rescue, one squad (engine rescue) and two tower ladders. The department also has an EMS Division which operates BLS (Basic Life Support) transport ambulances. The TVFD is dispatched by Tolland County Mutual Fire Service (Station TN).

== Points of interest ==
- Arts Center East
- Belding Wildlife Property
- Gene Pitney Exhibit in Town Hall
- New England Civil War Museum
- Rails to Trails
- Rockville Community Alliance
- Rockville Farmers Market
- Rockville Public Library
- Talcottville Historic District
- Talcottville Ravine
- Valley Falls Park
- Vernon Historical Society
- Victorian Homes
- Henry Park/Fox Hill Tower

== Notable people ==
- Jahine Arnold (born 1973), former NFL wide receiver
- Lucille Barkley, film actress in the 1940s and 1950s, died in Vernon
- Kevin Brown, current member of the Connecticut House of Representatives from the 56th district, which encompasses parts of the town of Vernon.
- Joe Courtney, current U.S. congressman from Connecticut's 2nd congressional district
- Stephen Farrell (1863–1933), world champion sprinter and track coach
- George L. Graziadio, Jr., business and property developer born in Vernon
- Marie Herbst, politician and former mayor of Vernon
- Ross A. Hull, radio engineer, lived and died in Vernon
- Martin Kellogg, former president of the University of California, was born in Vernon
- Morgan Lewis (1906–1968), songwriter and Broadway theatre composer
- Dwight Loomis (1821–1903), U.S. Representative
- Dwight Marcy, politician and attorney in Vernon
- Kenneth North (1930–2010), U.S. Air Force brigadier general
- Bob Pease (1940–2011), analog integrated circuit design expert and technical author
- Jim Penders, head coach of the Connecticut Huskies baseball team, was born in Vernon
- M. William Phelps, investigative journalist and crime writer, lives in Vernon
- Gene Pitney (1941–2006), internationally known singer/songwriter, member of the Rock & Roll Hall of Fame, born in Hartford, raised in Rockville
- Charles Ethan Porter (c. 1847–1923), an African-American still-life painter, lived in the Rockville neighborhood as a child
- Bill Romanowski, was born in Vernon; he is a former professional American football player and four-time Super Bowl champion
- Christian Sharps, inventor of the Sharps rifle, spent the final years of his life farming in Vernon
- Eliza Talcott, American missionary to Japan and co-founder of Kobe College
- Katie Taylor, Irish boxer and former footballer
- Teephlow, West African poet and rapper from Ghana; currently resides in Vernon
- Mark Warner, former Governor of Virginia and current U.S. Senator, was raised in Vernon
