= 1994 Connecticut Secretary of the State election =

1994 Connecticut Secretary of State election
- November 8, 1994

Nominee	Miles S. Rapoport	Andrea Scott
Party	Democratic	Republican
Alliance	A Connecticut Party
Popular vote	493,995	491,758
Percentage	50.1%	49.9%
- Rapoport: 50–60% 60–70% 70–80% Scott: 50–60% 60–70% 70–80%
Secretary of State before election
Pauline R. Kezer
Republican
Elected Secretary of State
Miles S. Rapoport
Democratic

The 1994 Connecticut Secretary of the State election took place on November 8, 1994, to elect the Secretary of the State of Connecticut. Incumbent Republican Pauline R. Kezer did not seek re-election to a second term, instead opting to run for governor.

Democratic nominee and state representative from the 18th district Miles S. Rapoport narrowly defeated Republican nominee Andrea Scott by 2,237 votes, a margin of just 0.22%. As of 2026, this was the last time the Secretary of the State of Connecticut changed partisan control.

== Republican primary ==
=== Candidates ===
==== Nominee ====
- Andrea Scott, candidate for secretary of the state in 1990 and member of the State Commission on Human Rights and Opportunities

== Democratic primary ==
=== Candidates ===
==== Nominee ====
- Miles S. Rapoport, state representative from the 18th district (1984–1994)

==== Eliminated in primary ====
- Julia H. Tashjian, former secretary of the state (1983–1991) and candidate for state representative from the 61st district in 1974

=== Endorsements ===
Miles S. Rapoport

State legislators

- Mary Mushinsky, state representative from the 85th district (1981–present)

Organizations

- Connecticut Chapter of the Sierra Club
- Connecticut Citizen Action Group
- National Organization for Women
- National Abortion Rights Action League

Labor unions

- Connecticut AFL-CIO
- Connecticut Education Association
- New England Health Care Employees Union
Julia H. Tashjian

Organizations

- Greater Bridgeport Women's Club
- United States Veterans political action committee

=== Results ===
The Democratic primary was held on September 13, 1994. State Representative Miles S. Rapoport defeated former Secretary of the State Julia H. Tashjian in a closer-than-expected race. Tashjian ran for re-election in 1990 but was defeated by Republican nominee Pauline R. Kezer. Tashjian was accused of benefiting from having her name next to state comptroller and gubernatorial candidate Bill Curry on the ballot, who exceeded expectations in the Democratic primary. Tashjian dismissed these claims, saying "Maybe Bill Curry benefitted a little bit from me. I went out there and met the voters."

Rapoport declared victory around 11:30 pm Tuesday night while Tashjian initially refused to concede the close race.

Democratic primary results
Party	Candidate	Votes	%
Democratic	Miles S. Rapoport	77,253	52.53%
Democratic	Julia H. Tashjian	69,801	47.47%
Total votes		147,054	100.0%

== Third-party candidates and independent candidates ==
=== A Connecticut Party ===
A Connecticut Party endorsed Rapoport, giving him access to an additional ballot line. Rapoport received just over a quarter of his total vote share under A Connecticut Party. Official designee

- Miles S. Rapoport, state representative from the 18th district (1984–1994)

== General election ==
=== Results ===
1994 Connecticut Secretary of the State election
Party	Candidate	Votes	%	±%
Democratic	Miles S. Rapoport	366,380	37.17%	
A Connecticut Party	Miles S. Rapoport	127,615	12.95%	
Total	Miles S. Rapoport	493,995	50.11%	
Republican	Andrea Scott	491,758	49.89%	
Total votes		985,753	100.0%	
Democratic gain from Republican				

=== By congressional district ===
Rapoport and Scott each won three of six congressional districts.

District	Scott	Rapoport	Representative
1st	41%	59%	Barbara Kennelly
2nd	46%	54%	Sam Gejdenson
3rd	48%	52%	Rosa DeLauro
4th	58%	42%	Chris Shays
5th	58%	42%	Gary Franks
6th	51%	49%	Nancy Johnson
