= 2018 Connecticut Secretary of the State election =

2018 Connecticut Secretary of State election
- November 6, 2018
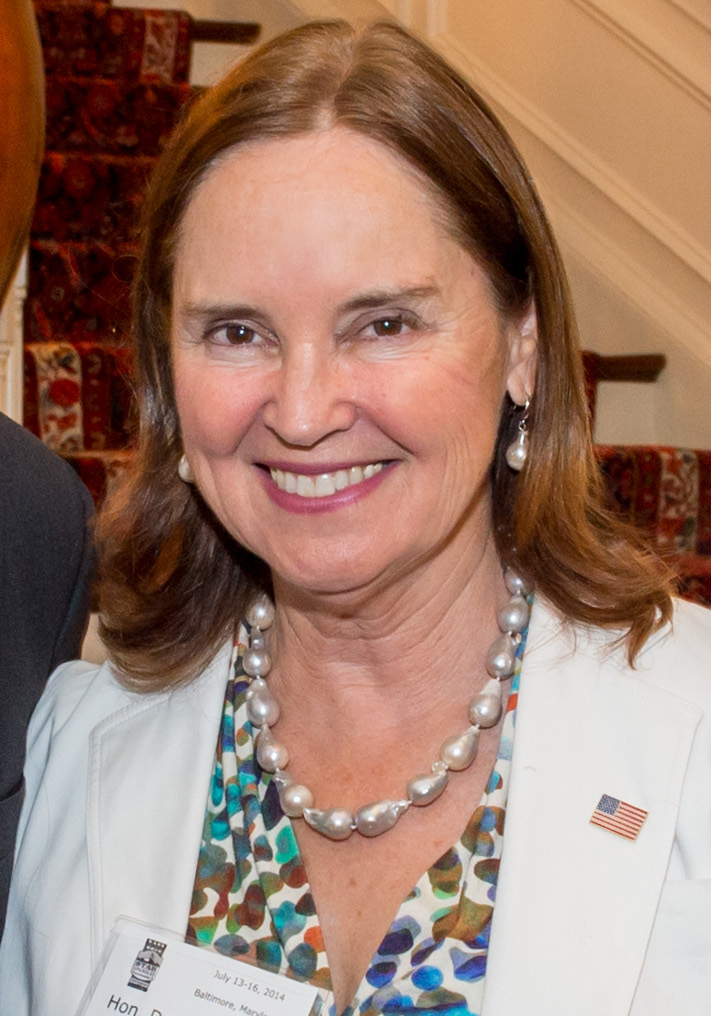

Nominee	Denise Merrill	Susan Chapman
Party	Democratic	Republican
Alliance	Working Families	Independent Party
Popular vote	764,067	580,779
Percentage	55.9%	42.5%
- Merrill: 40–50% 50–60% 60–70% 70–80% 80–90% 90–100% Chapman: 40–50% 50–60% 60–70%
Secretary of State before election
Denise Merrill
Democratic
Elected Secretary of State
Denise Merrill
Democratic

The 2018 Connecticut Secretary of the State election took place on November 6, 2018, to elect the next Secretary of the State of Connecticut. Incumbent Democrat Denise Merrill won re-election to a third term.

== Democratic primary ==
=== Candidates ===
==== Nominee ====
- Denise Merrill, incumbent secretary of the state (2011–2022)

== Republican primary ==
=== Candidates ===
==== Nominee ====
- Susan Chapman, candidate for first selectman of Fairfield in 2017

== Third-party candidates and independent candidates ==
=== Working Families ===
The Working Families Party endorsed Merrill, giving her access to a second ballot line.

Official designee

- Denise Merrill, incumbent secretary of state (2011–2022)

=== Independent Party of Connecticut ===
The Independent Party of Connecticut endorsed Chapman, giving her access to a second ballot line.

Official designee

- Susan Chapman, candidate for first selectman of Fairfield in 2017

=== Green Party ===
==== Nominee ====
- S. Michael DeRosa, nominee for secretary of the state in 2006, 2010, and 2014, U.S. House of Representatives from CT-01 in 2012 and 2016, and perennial candidate for state senator from the 1st district

=== Libertarian Party ===
==== Nominee ====
- Heather Lynn Sylvestre Gwynn

== General election ==
=== Predictions ===
Source	Ranking	As of
Governing	Likely D	October 11, 2018

=== Results ===
2018 Connecticut Secretary of the State election
Party	Candidate	Votes	%	±%
Democratic	Denise Merrill	735,743	53.80%	+5.71%
Working Families	Denise Merrill	28,324	2.07%	−0.79%
Total	Denise Merrill (incumbent)	764,067	55.87%	+4.91%
Republican	Susan Chapman	557,616	40.77%	−3.36%
Independent Party	Susan Chapman	23,163	1.69%	−0.93%
Total	Susan Chapman	580,779	42.46%	−4.29%
Green	S. Michael DeRosa	12,469	0.91%	−1.39%
Libertarian	Heather Lynn Sylvestre Gwynn	10,361	0.76%	N/A
Total votes		1,367,668	100.0%	
Democratic hold				

==== By congressional district ====
Merrill won all five congressional districts.

District	Merrill	Chapman	Representative
1st	60%	38%	John B. Larson
2nd	53%	45%	Joe Courtney
3rd	58%	40%	Rosa DeLauro
4th	57%	42%	Jim Himes
5th	52%	46%	Elizabeth Esty (115th Congress)
5th	52%	46%	Jahana Hayes (116th Congress)
