= 2014 Connecticut Secretary of the State election =

2014 Connecticut Secretary of State election
- November 4, 2014
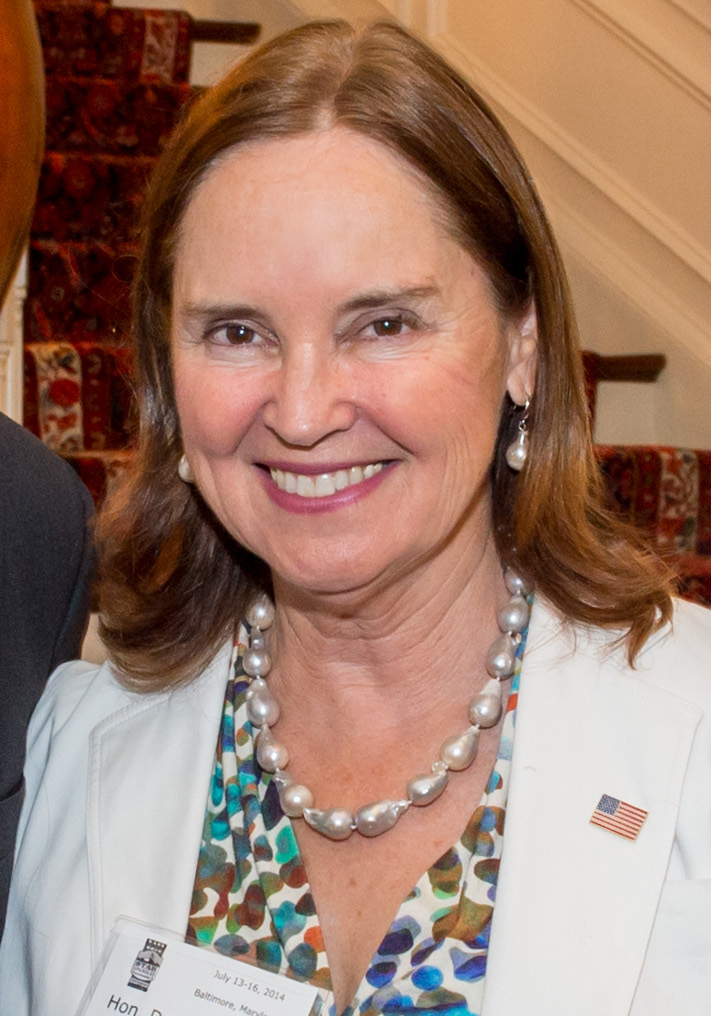

Nominee	Denise Merrill	Peter Lumaj
Party	Democratic	Republican
Alliance	Working Families	Independent Party
Popular vote	533,543	489,515
Percentage	51.0%	46.8%
- Merrill: 40–50% 50–60% 60–70% 70–80% 80–90% Lumaj: 40–50% 50–60% 60–70% 70–80%
Secretary of State before election
Denise Merrill
Democratic
Elected Secretary of State
Denise Merrill
Democratic

The 2014 Connecticut Secretary of the State election took place on November 4, 2014, to elect the next Secretary of the State of Connecticut. Incumbent Democrat Denise Merrill won re-election to a second term.

== Democratic primary ==
=== Candidates ===
==== Nominee ====
- Denise Merrill, incumbent secretary of the state (2011–2022)

== Republican primary ==
=== Candidates ===
==== Nominee ====
- Peter Lumaj, attorney and candidate for U.S. Senate in 2012

== Third-party candidates and independent candidates ==
=== Working Families ===
The Working Families Party endorsed Merrill, giving her access to a second ballot line. Official designee

- Denise Merrill, incumbent secretary of state (2011–2022)

=== Independent Party of Connecticut ===
The Independent Party of Connecticut endorsed Lumaj, giving him access to a second ballot line. Official designee

- Peter Lumaj, attorney and candidate for U.S. Senate in 2012

=== Green Party ===
==== Nominee ====
- S. Michael DeRosa, nominee for secretary of the state in 2006 and 2010, U.S House of Representatives from CT-01 in 2012, and perennial candidate for state senator from the 1st district

== General election ==
=== Results ===
2014 Connecticut Secretary of the State election
Party	Candidate	Votes	%	±%
Democratic	Denise Merrill	503,579	48.09%	−2.48%
Working Families	Denise Merrill	29,964	2.86%	+0.56%
Total	Denise Merrill (incumbent)	533,543	50.95%	-1.92%
Republican	Peter Lumaj	462,039	44.13%	+0.32%
Independent Party	Peter Lumaj	27,476	2.62%	+1.30%
Total	Peter Lumaj	489,515	46.75%	+2.94%
Green	S. Michael DeRosa	24,038	2.30%	+1.07%
Total votes		1,367,668	100.0%	
Democratic hold				

==== By congressional district ====
Merrill won three of five congressional districts, with the remaining two going to Lumaj, both of which elected Democrats.

District	Merrill	Lumaj	Representative
1st	55%	43%	John B. Larson
2nd	48.8%	48.6%	Joe Courtney
3rd	56%	42%	Rosa DeLauro
4th	48.6%	49.4%	Jim Himes
5th	46%	51%	Elizabeth Esty
