= 2010 Connecticut Secretary of the State election =

2010 Connecticut Secretary Election

2010 Connecticut Secretary of State election
- November 2, 2010
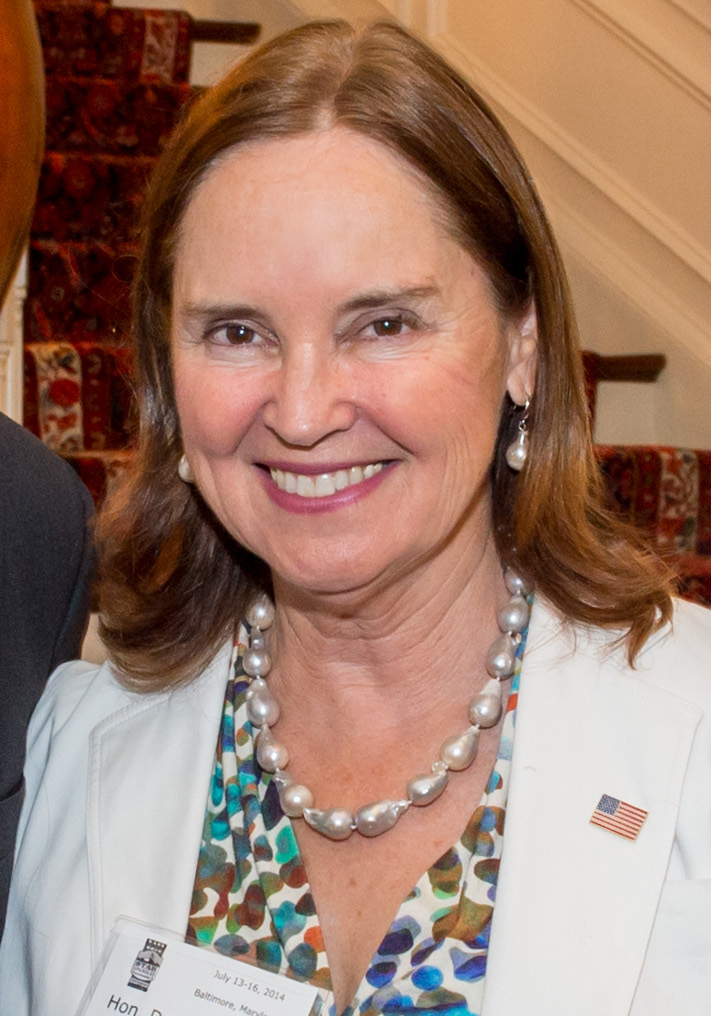

Nominee	Denise Merrill	Jerry Farrell Jr.
Party	Democratic	Republican
Alliance	Working Families
Popular vote	584,313	484,163
Percentage	52.9%	43.8%
- Merrill: 40–50% 50–60% 60–70% 70–80% 80–90% Farrell: 40–50% 50–60% 60–70% 70–80%
Secretary of State before election
Susan Bysiewicz
Democratic
Elected Secretary of State
Denise Merrill
Democratic

The 2010 Connecticut Secretary of the State election took place on November 2, 2010, to elect the Secretary of the State of Connecticut. Incumbent Democrat Susan Bysiewicz did not seek re-election to a 4th term, instead opting to run for Governor of Connecticut.

Democratic nominee and Majority Leader of the Connecticut House of Representatives Denise Merrill defeated Republican nominee Jerry Farrell Jr.

== Democratic primary ==
=== Candidates ===
==== Nominee ====
- Denise Merrill, state representative from the 54th district (1993–2011) and House Majority Leader (2009–2011)

==== Eliminated in primary ====
- Gerry Garcia, member of the New Haven Board of Alders

=== Results ===
Democratic primary results
Party	Candidate	Votes	%
Democratic	Denise Merrill	107,003	62.95%
Democratic	Gerry Garcia	62,978	37.05%
Total votes		169,981	100.0%

== Republican primary ==
=== Candidates ===
==== Nominee ====
- Jerry Farrell Jr, commissioner of the Connecticut Department of Consumer Protection (2006–2011), member of the Wallingford Town Council, and candidate for state representative from the 85th district in 2000

== Third-party candidates and independent candidates ==
=== Working Families ===
The Working Families Party endorsed Merrill, giving her access to a second ballot line. Official designee

- Denise Merrill, state representative from the 54th district (1993–2011) and House Majority Leader (2009–2011)

=== Independent Party of Connecticut ===
==== Nominee ====
- Michael J. Telesca, candidate for state representative from the 73rd district in 2006, Waterbury registrar of voters in 2004, and Democratic candidate for town clerk of Waterbury in 2001

=== Green Party ===
==== Nominee ====
- S. Michael DeRosa, nominee for secretary of the state in 2006 and perennial candidate for state senator from the 1st district

=== Libertarian Party ===
==== Nominee ====
- Ken Mosher, nominee for secretary of the state in 2006 and 1998, and state treasurer in 2002

== General election ==
=== Results ===
2010 Connecticut Secretary of the State election
Party	Candidate	Votes	%	±%
Democratic	Denise Merrill	558,914	50.57%	−19.21%
Working Families	Denise Merrill	25,399	2.30%	N/A
Total	Denise Merrill (incumbent)	584,313	52.87%	-16.91
Republican	Jerry Farrell Jr.	484,163	43.81%	+17.39%
Independent Party	Michael J. Telesca	14,530	1.32%	N/A
Green	S. Michael DeRosa	13,566	1.23%	−0.02%
Libertarian	Ken Mosher	8,631	0.78%	−0.47%
Total votes		1,105,203	100.0%	
Democratic hold				

==== By congressional district ====
Merrill won all five congressional districts.

District	Merrill	Farrell Jr.	Representative
1st	58%	39%	John B. Larson
2nd	52%	44%	Joe Courtney
3rd	56%	41%	Rosa DeLauro
4th	49%	48%	Jim Himes
5th	49%	48%	Chris Murphy
