= 2014 Connecticut elections =

A general election was held in the U.S. state of Connecticut on November 4, 2014. All of Connecticut's executive officers were up for election as well as all of Connecticut's five seats in the United States House of Representatives. Primary elections were held on August 26, 2014.

== Governor and lieutenant governor ==
Incumbent Democratic Governor Dannel Malloy and Lieutenant Governor Nancy Wyman are running for re-election to a second term in office. The Republican nominees are former U.S. Ambassador to Ireland and nominee for governor in 2010 Thomas C. Foley and Groton Town Councilor Heather Bond Somers.

Connecticut gubernatorial election, 2014
Party	Candidate	Votes	%
Democratic	Dannel Malloy/Nancy Wyman (incumbent)	554,314	50.7
Republican	Thomas C. Foley/Heather Bond Somers	526,295	48.2
Independent	Joe Visconti/Chester Harris	11,456	1.0
n/a	Write-ins	708	0.1
Total votes		1,092,773	100.0
Democratic hold			

== Attorney General ==
Incumbent Democratic Attorney General George Jepsen is running for re-election to a second term in office.

The Republican nominee is attorney and candidate for the U.S. Senate in 2012 Kie Westby. Also running is Stephen Fournier of the Green Party, an attorney and former member of the Hartford Board of Education who was his party's nominee for Connecticut's 1st congressional district in 2008 and for attorney general in 2010.

=== Polling ===
Poll source	Date(s) administered	Sample size	Margin of error	George Jepsen (D)	Kie Westby (R)	Stephen Fournier (G)	Undecided
Public Policy Polling	October 2–5, 2014	861	± 3.3%	45%	30%	9%	16%

=== Results ===
Connecticut Attorney General election, 2014
Party	Candidate	Votes	%
Democratic	George Jepsen (incumbent)	590,225	56.7
Republican	Kie Westby	427,869	41.1
Green	Stephen Fournier	22,361	2.1
Total votes		1,040,455	100.0
Democratic hold			

== Secretary of the State ==
Incumbent Democratic Secretary of the State Denise Merrill is running for re-election to a second term in office.

The Republican nominee is Peter Lumaj, an Albanian-born attorney and candidate for the U.S. Senate in 2012. Also running is Mike DeRosa of the Green Party, a perennial candidate for public office.

=== Polling ===
Poll source	Date(s) administered	Sample size	Margin of error	Denise Merrill (D)	Peter Lumaj (R)	Undecided
Public Policy Polling	October 2–5, 2014	861	± 3.3%	42%	33%	25%

=== Results ===
Connecticut Secretary of State election, 2014
Party	Candidate	Votes	%
Democratic	Denise Merrill (incumbent)	533,543	51.0
Republican	Peter Lumaj	489,515	46.7
Green	Mike DeRosa	24,038	2.3
Total votes		1,047,096	100.0
Democratic hold			

== Treasurer ==
Incumbent Democratic State Treasurer Denise L. Nappier is running for re-election to a fifth term in office.

The Republican nominee is Timothy Herbst, an attorney and the Trumbull Town First Selectman. Financier, movie producer and political activist Bob Eick had also been running for the Republican nomination. At the Republican State Convention on May 17, Herbst won the endorsement with 70.3% of the vote to Eick's 29.6%. Despite Eick having polled enough votes to appear on the primary ballot, he withdrew and did not force a primary election.

Rolf Maurer of the Green Party, a perennial candidate for public office, is running a write-in campaign. He is also the Green Party nominee for comptroller.

=== Polling ===
Poll source	Date(s) administered	Sample size	Margin of error	Denise L. Nappier (D)	Timothy Herbst (R)	Undecided
Public Policy Polling (D)	October 2–5, 2014	861	± 3.3%	45%	37%	18%

=== Results ===
Connecticut Treasurer election, 2014
Party	Candidate	Votes	%
Democratic	Denise Nappier (incumbent)	533,182	50.9
Republican	Tim Herbst	514,402	49.1
n/a	Write-ins	119	0.0
Total votes		1,047,703	100.0
Democratic hold			

== Comptroller ==
Incumbent Democratic State Comptroller Kevin Lembo is running for re-election to a second term in office.

Two Republicans ran for their party's nomination: Marine Corps veteran and former Republican legislative intern Angel Cadena and accountant Sharon J. McLaughlin. At the Republican State Convention on May 17, McLaughlin won the endorsement with 63.8% of the vote. Cadena received 36.1%, assuring him of a place on the primary ballot.

Republican primary results
Party	Candidate	Votes	%
Republican	Sharon J. McLaughlin	53,373	75.61
Republican	Angel Cadena	17,214	24.39
Total votes		70,587	100

Also running is Rolf Maurer of the Green Party, a perennial candidate for public office, who is also running a write-in campaign for treasurer.

=== Polling ===
Poll source	Date(s) administered	Sample size	Margin of error	Kevin Lembo (D)	Sharon McLaughlin (R)	Rolf Maurer (G)	Undecided
Public Policy Polling	October 2–5, 2014	861	± 3.3%	38%	33%	12%	17%

=== Results ===
Connecticut Comptroller election, 2014
Party	Candidate	Votes	%
Democratic	Kevin Lembo (incumbent)	538,280	52.3
Republican	Sharon McLaughlin	473,752	46.0
Green	Rolf Maurer	17,458	1.7
Total votes		1,029,490	100.0
Democratic hold			

Results by county Lembo: 40–50%; 50–60%; McLaughlin: 50–60%

Results by municipality Lembo: 40–50%; 50–60%; 60–70%; 70–80%; 80–90%; McLaughlin: 40–50%; 50–60%; 60–70%; 70–80%

== United States House of Representatives ==
All of Connecticut's five seats in the United States House of Representatives were up for election in 2014. The Democratic Party won all of them. No districts changed hands.
