= Andy Fleischmann =

American politician

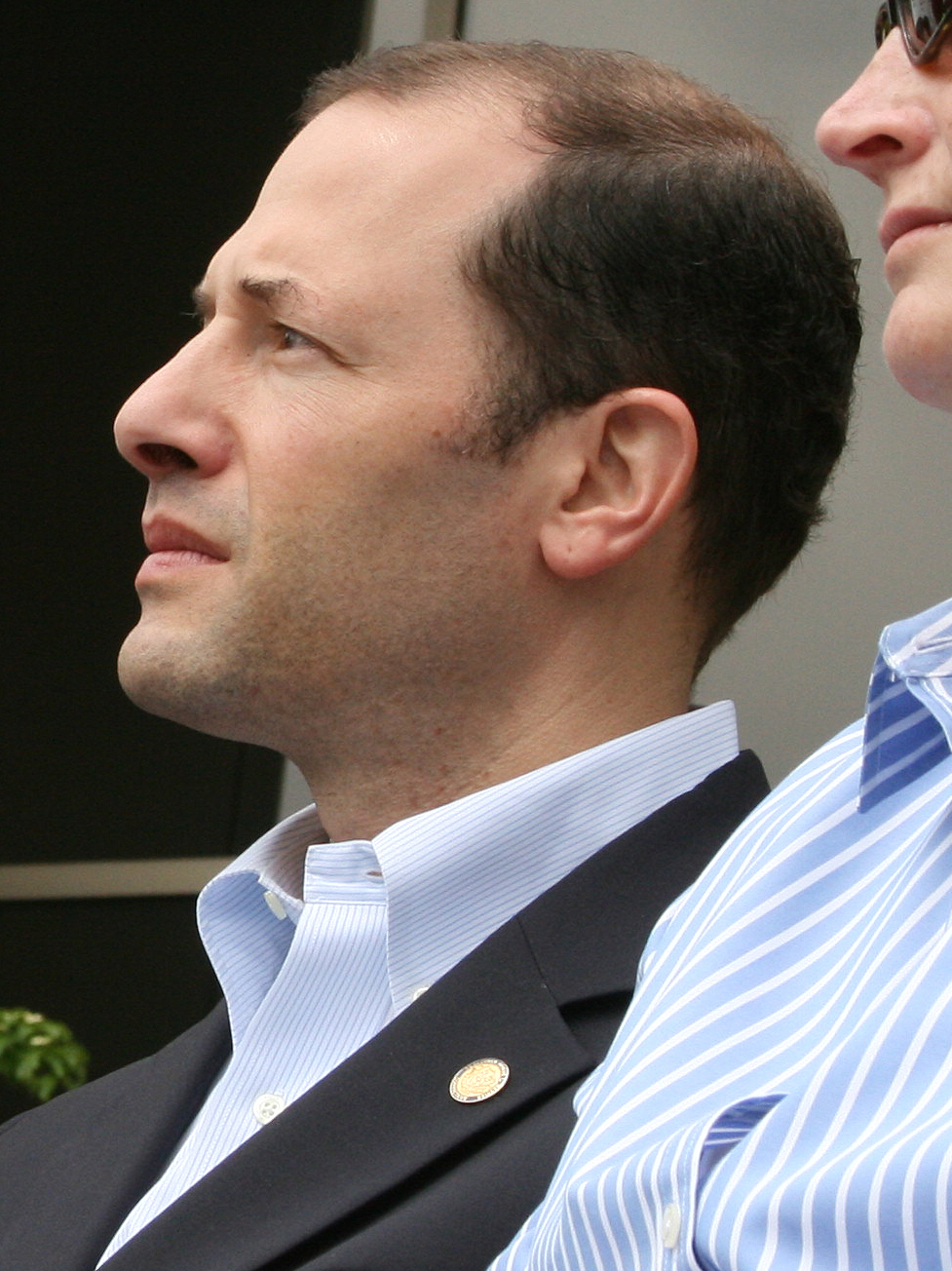

Member of the Connecticut House of Representatives from the 18th district
- In office January 1995 – January 9, 2019
- Preceded by: Miles S. Rapoport
- Succeeded by: Jillian Gilchrest

Personal details
- Party: Democratic
- Spouse: Caroline Shaffery
- Education: Princeton University (A.B.); Stanford University (M.A.)
- Occupation: President & CEO, Nutmeg Big Brothers Big Sisters
- Website: www.housedems.ct.gov/Fleischmann

Andrew Mark Fleischmann was a Democratic member of the Connecticut House of Representatives, who represented the 18th Assembly District, which consists of portions of West Hartford, Connecticut, United States.

A graduate of Hall High School in West Hartford, Fleischmann attended Princeton University and graduated cum laude with an A.B. from the Woodrow Wilson School of Public and International Affairs with Phi Beta Kappa honors. He completed a 158-page long senior thesis titled "The Community Action Program and Black Political Power." He received a master's degree in history from Stanford University, with a concentration on modern U.S. public policy.

Representative Miles S. Rapoport launched a successful bid for Connecticut Secretary of State in 1994. Fleischmann defeated five primary election opponents to become the Democratic candidate to succeed Rapoport in the 18th Assembly District and won the general election that November. He was re-elected in 1996, 1998, 2000, 2002, 2004, 2006, 2008, 2010, 2012, 2014, and 2016.

In 2010, House Majority Leader Denise Merrill launched a successful bid for Connecticut Secretary of State. Flesichmann narrowly lost a bid to Brendan Sharkey to succeed Merrill as House Majority Leader in the 2011 legislative session.

Fleischmann was Chairman of the House Education Committee and of the House Appropriations Subcommittee for Elementary and Secondary Education. He had given particular attention to strengthening state funding for public schools, increasing academic rigor for students and educators alike, and protecting children from harmful pesticides. When he served on the Government Administration and Elections Committee, he was a leading proponent of campaign finance reform - a set of statutory changes that set up Connecticut's Citizens' Election Program - allowing candidates to collect only small contributions ($5-$100) from individuals, and then receive a public grant for their campaign. He had opposed subsequent efforts to undermine this system since its creation in 2005.

Fleischmann, a 12-term incumbent, ran for re-election in 2018 but was defeated in the Democratic primary by Jillian Gilchrest.

Fleischmann serves as president and CEO of Nutmeg Big Brothers Big Sisters, an affiliate of Big Brothers Big Sisters of America. Fleischmann and his wife live in West Hartford with their two daughters.
