= Tiffani McGinnis =

American politician

Member-elect of the Connecticut House of Representatives from the 18th district
- Assuming office January 2027
- Succeeding: Jillian Gilchrest

Personal details
- Party: Democratic
- Website: Campaign website

Tiffani McGinnis is an American politician. A member of the Democratic Party, she is the member-elect for the 18th district of the Connecticut House of Representatives. She succeeded Jillian Gilchrest, who ran for Congress, at the 2026 election.
