= Jonathan Pelto =

American politician

Member of the Connecticut House of Representatives from the 54th district
- In office 1985–1995
- Preceded by: Dorothy Goodwin
- Succeeded by: Denise Merrill

Personal details
- Party: Democratic

Jonathan W. Pelto is an American politician from the state of Connecticut. A member of the Democratic Party, he served in the Connecticut House of Representatives.

== Political career ==
Pelto began working in politics by stuffing envelopes for George McGovern's 1972 presidential campaign at the age of 11. In 1980, at the age of 18, Pelto managed field operations for Sam Gejdenson's successful election to the United States House of Representatives. In 1984, he worked as the Connecticut campaign chair for Gary Hart's presidential campaign, helping Hart defeat eventual nominee Walter Mondale in the Connecticut primary election. That year, he was elected to the Connecticut House of Representatives. He served as the Connecticut Democratic Party political director in 1990. He opted not to run for reelection in 1994, retiring to the private sector. He resigned from the State House in September 1993. He opened a consulting firm, called Impact Strategies Inc., when he left the state legislature.

Unhappy with the tenure of Governor Dannel Malloy, Johnathan Pelto and his running mate took the needed steps to be legitimate "Write-In" candidate for governor. They had a number of interviews and blog postings during the campaign, but they did not get the needed signatures to receive an official placement on the ballot. In the end, Pelto received 568 votes of the 1,081,317 cast for Governor. Malloy received 554,314, while Foley received 526,295. Write-in candidates Daniel R Gait running mate Jason D Smith received 108 votes, while two other teams received 32 votes combined.

In 2016, Pelto has been nominated and is running for Representative in U.S. Congress representing Connecticut for the Green Party, competing against Joe Courtney (D), Daria Novak (R), and Daniel Reale (L).

== Personal life ==
Pelto and his wife, Nicole, have two daughters named Mara and Aliza. He also teaches at Quinnipiac University.
