= Jillian Gilchrest =

American politician from Connecticut

Member of the Connecticut House of Representatives from the 18th district
- Incumbent
- Assumed office January 9, 2019
- Preceded by: Andy Fleischmann
- Succeeded by: Tiffani McGinnis (elect)

Personal details
- Born: Jillian Marie Spies; March 21, 1982 (age 44)
- Party: Democratic
- Spouse: Evan Gilchrest
- Children: 2
- Education: University of Connecticut (BA, MSW)

Jillian Marie Gilchrest (born March 21, 1982) is an American politician who was a member of the Connecticut House of Representatives from the 18th district in Hartford County.

== Early life ==
Gilchrest earned a BA in Women's Studies from the University of Connecticut in 2004. She would later earn a master's degree in social work from the University of Connecticut School of Social Work.

== Career ==
Gilchrest was elected to the West Hartford Public Schools board of education in 2013. Gilchrest served as the Director of Health Professional Outreach for the Connecticut Coalition Against Domestic Violence, Executive Director of NARAL Pro-Choice Connecticut, and Director of Policy & Communications for the Connecticut Alliance to End Sexual Violence.In August 2025, Gilchrest announced that she would run for the U.S. House of Representatives in Connecticut's 1st congressional district, challenging Democratic incumbent John B. Larson.

=== 2026 congressional campaign ===
Democratic primary results
Party	Candidate	Votes	%
Democratic	Luke Bronin	30,362	54.2
Democratic	John Larson (incumbent)	18,444	33.0
Democratic	Jillian Gilchrest	4,518	8.1
Democratic	Ruth Fortune	2,647	4.7
Total votes		55,971	100.0

=== 2018 Election ===
Connecticut House: General Election 2018: 18th District
Party	Candidate	Votes	%
Democratic	Jillian Gilchrest	7,608	71.9
Republican	Mary Fay	2,977	28.1

Connecticut House: Democratic Primary 2018: 18th District
Party	Candidate	Votes	%
Democratic	Jillian Gilchrest	1,707	52.3
Democratic	Andy Fleischmann (incumbent)	1,558	47.7

=== 2020 Election ===
Connecticut House: General Election 2020: 18th District
Party	Candidate	Votes	%
Democratic	Jillian Gilchrest	9,030	72.7
Republican	Rick Bush	3,387	27.3

=== 2022 Election ===
Connecticut House: General Election 2022: 18th District
Party	Candidate	Votes	%
Democratic	Jillian Gilchrest	7,676	100.0

== Political views ==
=== Connecticut family medical leave act (CFMLA) ===
Gilchrest voted in favor of the Connecticut family medical leave act signed into law one June 25, 2019 by Connecticut Governor Ned Lamont. The bill passed the house on May 31, 2019, by a 79–69 vote. Connecticut will join California, Massachusetts, New Jersey, New York, Rhode Island, Washington and the District of Columbia in implementing a paid-family-leave insurance program. The bill provides employees with up to 12 weeks of paid leave in a 12-month period to care for themselves, family members—including a spouse, parents, in-laws, children, siblings, grandparents, and grandchildren—and anyone else whose close association, whether by blood or affinity, is the equivalent of a family member. Employees will fund the paid-family-leave program by contributing 0.5 percent of their income via a mandatory payroll tax, with contributions commencing in January 2021. Employers make no contributions toward the program. State government employees who belong to unions are exempt, a fact that did not go unnoticed by private business opponents to the bill.

=== Gun control ===
In 2020 Gilchrest proposed a bill H.B. 5040, which would require gun owners to pay a 35 percent ammunition tax. In the previous legislative session she proposed a 50 percent ammunition tax, that ended up being unsuccessful. The bill would use money raised from the ammunition tax to fund statewide gun violence prevention and intervention efforts.

=== Police accountability movement 2020 ===
In July 2020, all three West Hartford representatives, Tammy Exum, Joe Verrengia and Gilchrest, voted in favor of the police accountability act passed by the Connecticut House of Representatives. The bill includes a provision that would allow citizens to file civil lawsuits against police, eliminating the qualified immunity which protects officers from being sued in states courts.

=== Reproductive Freedom Defense Act ===
In 2022, Gilchrest cosponsored House Bill 5414, along with Rep. Matt Blumenthal, with whom she had cofounded the General Assembly's Reproductive Freedom Caucus that year. The bill, signed into law by Governor Ned Lamont shortly after passage as the Reproductive Freedom Defense Act, was a response to the Texas Heartbeat Act and similar legislation passed in other states to restrict abortion access in anticipation of the Supreme Court's Dobbs v. Jackson Women's Health Organization decision, which overruled Roe v. Wade, and held that there is no constitutional right to abortion, allowing states to ban it outright, as several did in its immediate aftermath. It allows those who provide or facilitate the provision of abortions in Connecticut and are sued under laws like that in Texas to countersue in Connecticut for equivalent damages, prevents the state and its courts from assisting in the investigation or prosecutions of any abortions in other states that would be legal in Connecticut, or extraditing Connecticut residents charged in other states for such acts. It also expands abortion services available in Connecticut by allowing certain non-physicians to perform suction and medication abortions.
