= Maura Melley =

American lawyer and civil servant

Maura L. Melley

Secretary of the State of Connecticut
- In office January 29, 1982 – January 5, 1983
- Governor: William A. O'Neill
- Preceded by: Barbara B. Kennelly
- Succeeded by: Julia Tashjian

Personal details
- Party: Democratic Party
- Education: University of St. Joseph (BA); Western New England University (JD)
- Occupation: Lawyer, insurance executive, civil servant

Maura L. Melley is an American lawyer, insurance executive, and civil servant who served 11 months as Secretary of the State of Connecticut from 1982 to 1983. Governor William A. O'Neill appointed her to the office effective January 29, 1982 to fill the vacancy caused by the resignation of Barbara B. Kennelly, who had been elected to the US House of Representatives.

A Democrat from Wethersfield, Melley had served as corporate division manager and deputy secretary of the state under Kennelly since 1979. O'Neill made the appointment with the understanding that Melley would not seek a full term.

She has served as director of government relations for The Hartford Insurance Group as of 1986 and vice president of public affairs for Phoenix Home Life Mutual Insurance Company from 1992 to 2002. She was elected chair of the board of trustees at Saint Joseph's College in 1994. She was instrumental in the redevelopment of the Adriaen's Landing district of Hartford.

Melley graduated from Windsor High School and received her bachelor's degree from St. Joseph's College in West Hartford in 1973. She received the college's Distinguished Alumni Award in 1983. Melley went on to receive a Juris Doctor degree from Western New England College School of Law in 1978. She was 30 years old when sworn in as Secretary of the State.

Political offices
Preceded by Barbara B. Kennelly	Secretary of State of Connecticut; 1982–1983	Succeeded by Julia Tashjian
