= Bob Eick =

Bob Eick is a financier, movie producer, former political candidate, and activist from Connecticut. He is best known for his work as the executive producer of the Blair Witch Project. Eick currently resides in Wilton, Connecticut.

Eick was born in Bridgeport, Connecticut, to a working-class family of predominantly Hungarian, English, and German descent, and grew up in neighboring Fairfield. He is an alumnus of Roger Ludlowe High School, Boston College, and New York University. He is a former partner in CRT Capital Group, a Stamford, Connecticut-based investment firm. Bob Eick also produces independent films including The Blair Witch Project, one of the most financially successful independent films of all time.

In 2014, Eick announced that he was a candidate for the Republican nomination for Connecticut State Treasurer in the 2014 elections. Eick has criticized the record of incumbent Democratic State Treasurer Denise Nappier. He proposed reforms in Connecticut's pension fund management. At the Republican State Convention on May 17, Eick received 29.6% of the vote to attorney and the Trumbull Town First Selectman Timothy Herbst's 70.3%. Despite Eick having polled enough votes to appear on the primary ballot, he withdrew and did not force a primary election.

He was elected in the 1990s to the Fairfield Planning and Zoning Commission.
