= Samuel Carmody =

American politician

Member-elect of the Connecticut House of Representatives from the 85th district
- Assuming office January 2027
- Succeeding: Mary Mushinsky

Personal details
- Born: Samuel Carmody; 1986 (age 39–40)
- Party: Democratic
- Education: Albertus Magnus College (attended)
- Website: Campaign website

Samuel Carmody is an American politician. A member of the Democratic Party, he is the member-elect for the 85th district of the Connecticut House of Representatives. He was elected at the 2026 election. He is the Vice-Chair of the Wallingford Town Council.
