= Mary Mushinsky =

American politician (born 1951)

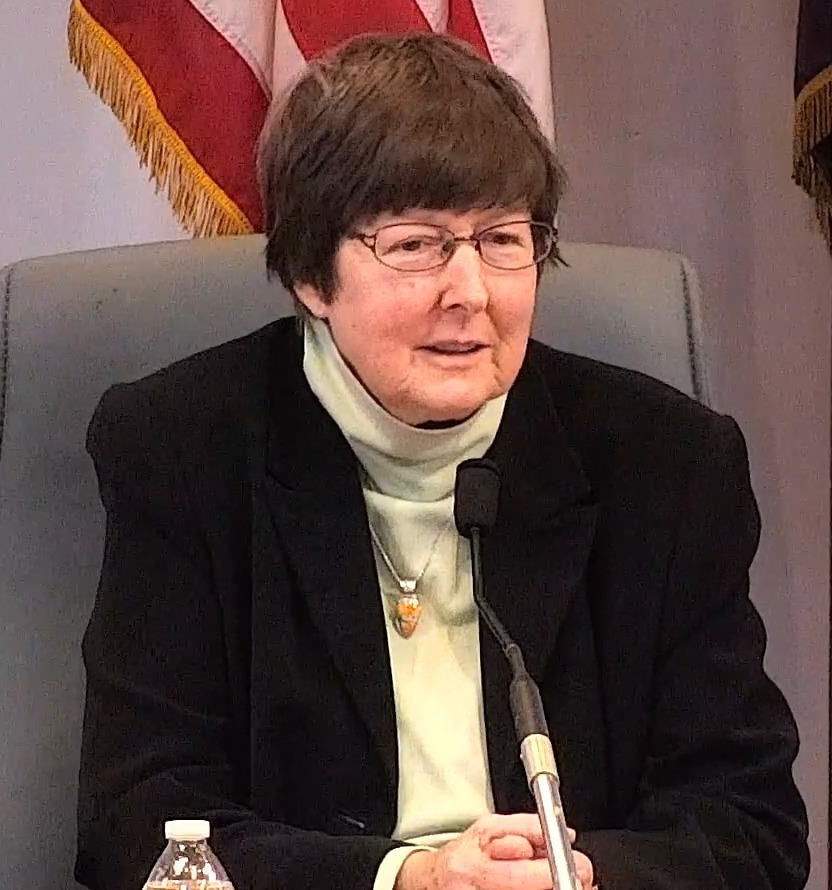
- Mushinsky in 2023

Member of the Connecticut House of Representatives from the 85th district
- In office January 7, 1981 – January 6, 2027
- Preceded by: Michael S. Kraskowski
- Succeeded by: Samuel Carmody (elect)

Personal details
- Born: October 7, 1951 (age 75) New Haven, Connecticut, U.S.
- Party: Democratic
- Spouse: Martin J. Waters
- Children: 2
- Education: Southern Connecticut State University (BA); Wesleyan University (MA)

Mary M. Mushinsky (born October 7, 1951) is an American politician who has served in the Connecticut House of Representatives from the 85th district since 1981.

In 1992, she was awarded the Sierra Club Distinguished Service Award, which honors persons in public service for strong and consistent commitment to conservation. Mushinsky was a member of the Environment Committee and in 1990, as chair of that committee, Mushinsky introduced a bill that is believed to be the first bill passed in the United States to use the term "climate change". During the 2021–22 session, she served as a deputy speaker of the Connecticut House of Representatives.

As of 2026, Mushinsky is the longest-serving member in the history of the Connecticut House of Representatives. She announced in February 2026 that she would not run for reelection in the fall.
