= Connecticut Citizen Action Group =

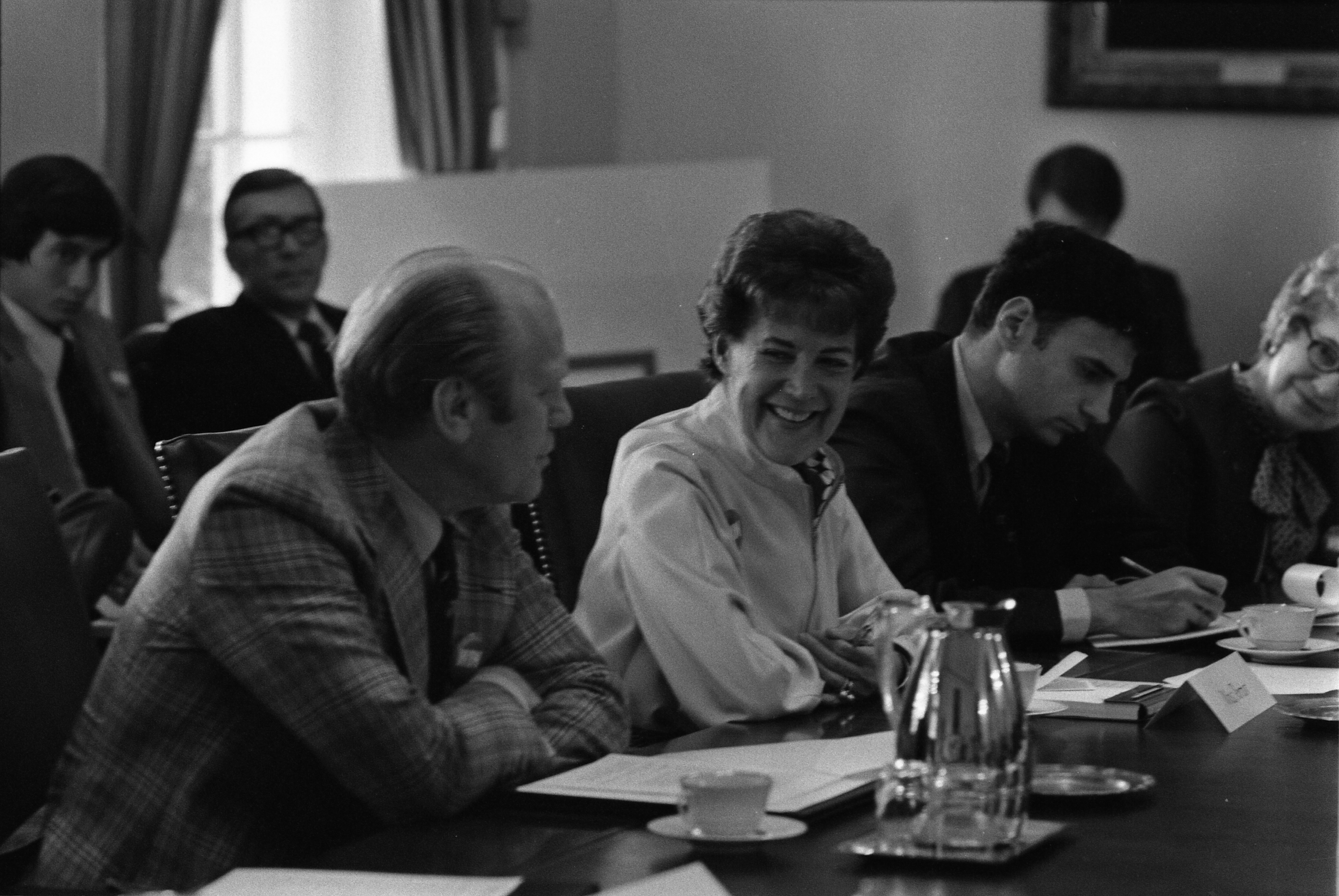
President Gerald Ford (left) with Sylvia Porter (center) and Ralph Nader (right) at a meeting of the Citizens Action Committee to End Inflation on October 12, 1974

The Connecticut Citizen Action Group (CCAG) is a public advocacy group prominent in Connecticut politics. Founded by politician and consumer advocate Ralph Nader and future Congressman Toby Moffett in 1970, CCAG seeks to promote social, economic, and environmental justice. Past leadership included Miles S. Rapoport, who led the group from 1979 to 1984.

The organization has done extensive campaigning for clean elections, consumer protection, universal healthcare, environmental protection, and against government corruption and war. It is Connecticut's oldest and largest non-profit public interest group, with over 20,000 citizen members within the state.

Some of CCAG's past legislative victories include obtaining expiration dates on dairy products in 1972, passage of the nations second "bottle bill" (five cent returnables on bottles and cans) in 1978, blocking the Interstate 84 expansion to Rhode Island in 1983, passage of the HUSKY (Health Care for Uninsured Kids and Youth) medical program in 1997, and the 2005 passage of the Citizens Election Program.

They are not affiliated with any political party and have no set ideology, but regularly endorse electoral candidates and political movements.

The organization is currently based in the West End of Hartford, Connecticut, and regularly runs a team of canvassers.
