= 1990 Connecticut Secretary of the State election =

1990 Connecticut Secretary of State election
- November 6, 1990
Nominee	Pauline R. Kezer	Julia H. Tashjian
Party	Republican	Democratic
Popular vote	490,153	446,253
Percentage	52.3%	47.7%
- Kezer: 50–60% 60–70% 70–80% 80–90% Tashjian: 50–60% 60–70% 70–80% Tie: 50%
Secretary of State before election
Julia H. Tashjian
Democratic
Elected Secretary of State
Pauline R. Kezer
Republican

The 1990 Connecticut Secretary of the State election took place on November 6, 1990, to elect the Secretary of the State of Connecticut. Republican nominee Pauline R. Kezer defeated two-term incumbent Democrat Julia H. Tashjian. As of 2026, this was the last time a Republican was elected Secretary of the State of Connecticut.

== Democratic primary ==
=== Candidates ===
==== Nominee ====
- Julia H. Tashjian, incumbent secretary of the state (1983–1991)

== Republican primary ==
=== Candidates ===
==== Nominee ====
- Pauline R. Kezer, state representative from the 22nd district (1979–1987)

== General election ==
=== Results ===
1990 Connecticut Secretary of the State election
Party	Candidate	Votes	%	±%
Republican	Pauline R. Kezer	490,153	52.34%	
Democratic	Julia H. Tashjian (incumbent)	446,253	47.66%	
Total votes		936,406	100.0%	
Republican gain from Democratic				
