= Julia Tashjian =

American politician (1938–2013)

69th Secretary of the State of Connecticut
- In office January 3, 1983 – January 3, 1991
- Governor: William O'Neill
- Preceded by: Maura Melley
- Succeeded by: Pauline R. Kezer

Personal details
- Born: June 8, 1938 Pawtucket, Rhode Island
- Died: May 9, 2013 (aged 74)
- Party: Democratic

Julia H. Tashjian (June 8, 1938 – May 9, 2013) was an American politician.

Born in Pawtucket, Rhode Island, Tashjian moved with her family to Connecticut and went to school in Hartford, Connecticut. She lived in Windsor, Connecticut from 1966 until her death. Tashjian was a member of the Democratic Party. Tashjian served as the Secretary of State of Connecticut from 1983 to 1991, losing her 1990 reelection campaign to Republican Party nominee Pauline R. Kezer. Tashjian ran again for Secretary of State in 1994 but lost the Democratic primary to Miles S. Rapoport.

Party political offices
Preceded by Barbara B. Kennelly	Democratic nominee for Secretary of the State of Connecticut; 1982, 1986, 1990	Succeeded by Miles S. Rapoport
Political offices
Preceded by Maura Melley	Secretary of State of Connecticut; 1983–1991	Succeeded by Pauline R. Kezer
