= 1998 Connecticut Secretary of the State election =

1998 Connecticut Secretary of State election
- November 3, 1998
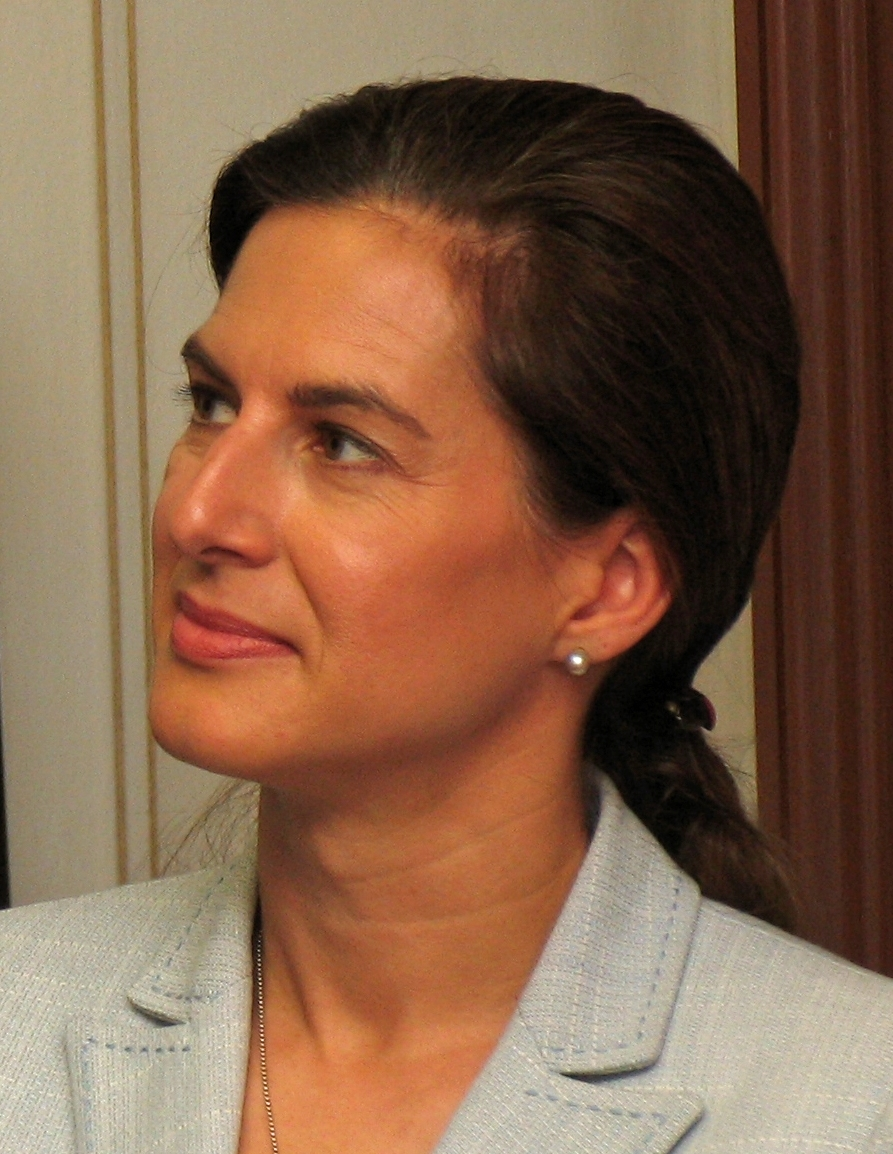

| Nominee | Susan Bysiewicz | Ben Andrews |
| Party | Democratic | Republican |
| Popular vote | 531,644 | 358,060 |
| Percentage | 59.1% | 39.8% |
- Bysiewicz: 40–50% 50–60% 60–70% 70–80% Andrews: 40–50% 50–60% 60–70% 70–80%
Secretary of State before election
Miles S. Rapoport
Democratic
Elected Secretary of State
Susan Bysiewicz
Democratic

The 1998 Connecticut Secretary of the State election took place on November 3, 1998, to elect the Secretary of the State of Connecticut. Incumbent Democrat Miles S. Rapoport did not seek re-election to a second term, instead opting to run for the open CT-01 seat in the U.S. House of Representatives.

Democratic nominee and state representative from the 100th district Susan Bysiewicz defeated Republican nominee Ben Andrews.

== Democratic primary ==
=== Candidates ===
==== Nominee ====
- Susan Bysiewicz, attorney and state representative from the 100th district (1993–1999)

==== Eliminated in primary ====
- Ellen Scalettar, state representative from the 114th district (1993–1999)

=== Convention ===
The Democratic statewide nominating convention was held on July 19, 1998.

The convention was a competitive race between two state representatives, Ellen Scalleter from the 114th district and Susan Bysiewicz from the 100th district. According to NYT, "Ms. Bysiewicz's aides swarmed the convention floor in headsets and sunny yellow T-shirts today, while Ms. Scalletar treated delegates to dessert and breakfast, ran a shuttle bus and decorated the area around the convention with bouquets of lilies and life-size cardboard cutouts of herself."

Scaletter won the party's endorsement with 58% of the vote to Bysiewicz's 42%. Bysiewicz pledged to her supporters that she would continue her campaign into the primary race in September. After the convention, Scaletter met with Bysiewicz but failed to convince her to avoid a potentially expensive primary race.

=== Results ===
The Democratic primary was held on September 18, 1998. Susan Bysiewicz narrowly defeated state party-endorsed Ellen Scaletter in an upset.

Democratic primary results
| Party | Candidate | Votes | % |
|---|---|---|---|
| Democratic | Susan Bysiewicz | 51,435 | 51.91% |
| Democratic | Ellen Scaletter * | 47,652 | 48.09% |
| Total votes | | 99,087 | 100.0% |

* Indicates party endorsement

== Republican primary ==
=== Candidates ===
==== Nominee ====
- Ben Andrews, former president of the Connecticut chapter of the NAACP and candidate for state representative from the 1st district in 1978

== Third-party candidates and independent candidates ==
=== Libertarian Party ===
==== Nominee ====
- Kenneth F. Mosher

=== Write-in candidates ===
- Abraham 'Abe' Ziskis

== General election ==
=== Results ===
1998 Connecticut Secretary of the State election
| Party | Candidate | Votes | % | ±% |
|---|---|---|---|---|
| Democratic | Susan Bysiewicz | 531,644 | 59.10% | |
| Republican | Ben Andrews | 358,060 | 39.80% | |
| Libertarian | Kenneth F. Mosher | 9,920 | 1.10% | |
| Write-in | Abraham 'Abe' Ziskis | 10 | 0.00% | |
| Total votes | | 899,634 | 100.0% | |
| Democratic hold | | | | |

=== By congressional district ===
Bysiewicz won all six congressional districts, including two that elected Republicans.

| District | Bysiewicz | Andrews | Representative |
|---|---|---|---|
| 1st | 68% | 31% | Barbara Kennelly (105th Congress) |
| 1st | 68% | 31% | John Larson (106th Congress) |
| 2nd | 64% | 35% | Sam Gejdenson |
| 3rd | 62% | 37% | Rosa DeLauro |
| 4th | 50% | 49% | Chris Shays |
| 5th | 51% | 48% | James Maloney |
| 6th | 58% | 41% | Nancy Johnson |

== Aftermath ==
In October 2003 former Republican nominee Ben Andrews was convicted following a corruption trial. The investigation determined that he had bribed former state treasurer, Paul J. Silvester, by directing $750,000 of a $1.5 million consulting fee in exchange for Silvester's investment of $150 million in pension money in a private equity fund, Landmark Partners, based in Simsbury.

Andrews was also convicted of lying to federal agents and of conspiracy to launder money. He continued to maintain his innocence up until his sentencing to 30 months in federal prison in 2005. He began his sentence in 2007 and was released in 2009.
