= 2006 Connecticut Secretary of the State election =

2006 Connecticut Secretary of State election
- November 7, 2006
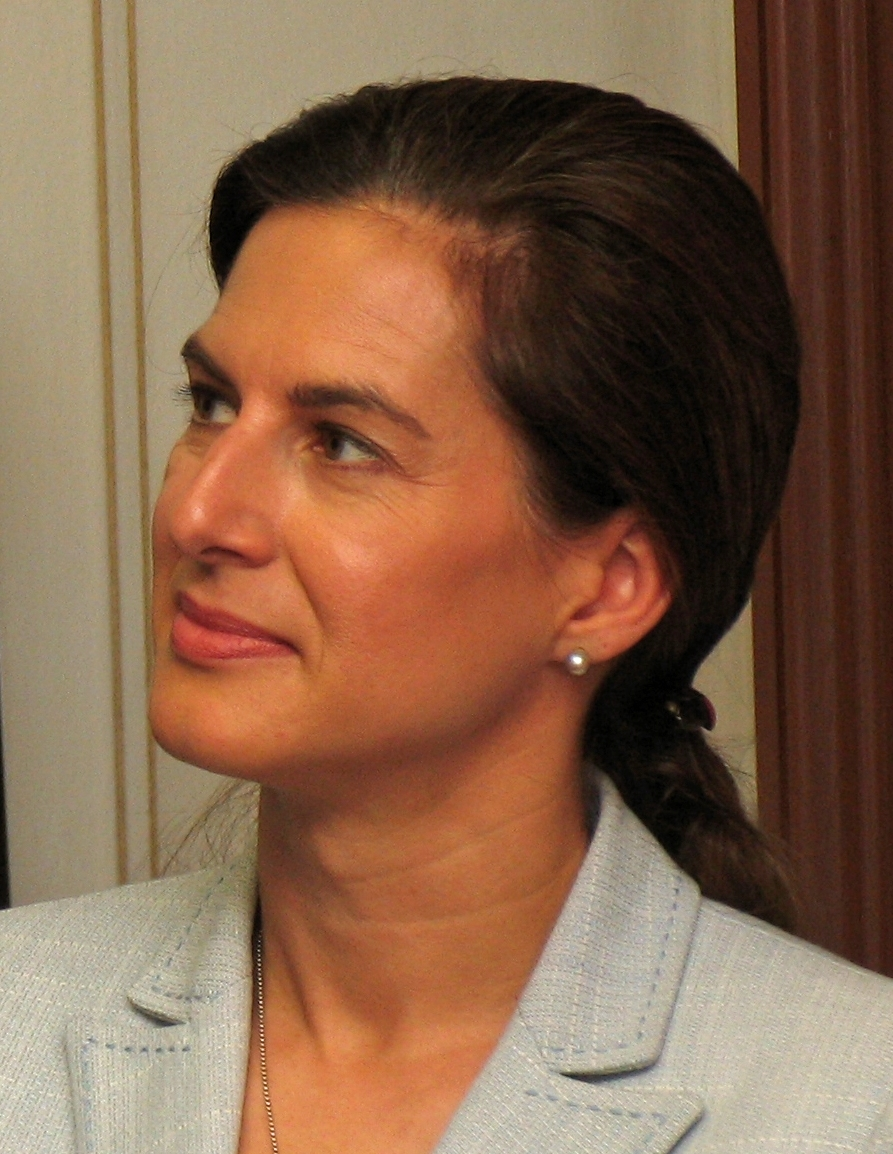

Nominee	Susan Bysiewicz	Richard J. Abbate
Party	Democratic	Republican
Popular vote	729,070	276,033
Percentage	69.8%	26.4%
- Bysiewicz: 40–50% 50–60% 60–70% 70–80% 80–90% Abbate: 40–50% 60–70%
Secretary of State before election
Susan Bysiewicz
Democratic
Elected Secretary of State
Susan Bysiewicz
Democratic

The 2006 Connecticut Secretary of the State election took place on November 7, 2006, to elect the Secretary of the State of Connecticut. Incumbent Democrat Susan Bysiewicz won re-election to a third term, defeating Republican nominee Richard J. Abbate.

== Democratic primary ==
=== Candidates ===
==== Nominee ====
- Susan Bysiewicz, incumbent secretary of the state (1999–2011)

== Republican primary ==
=== Candidates ===
==== Nominee ====
- Richard J. Abbate, president of the Registrars of Voters Association of Connecticut (2002–2006), Cheshire registrar of voters (1996–2006), and president of Connecticut Sports Development Group, Inc. (1992–1996)

== Third-party candidates and independent candidates ==
=== Green Party ===
==== Nominee ====
- S. Michael DeRosa, perennial candidate for state senator from the 1st district

=== Libertarian Party ===
==== Nominee ====
- Ken Mosher, nominee for secretary of the state in 1998 and state treasurer in 2002

=== Concerned Citizens Party ===
==== Nominee ====
- Jean Marie Burness

== General election ==
=== Results ===
2006 Connecticut Secretary of the State election
Party	Candidate	Votes	%	±%
Democratic	Susan Bysiewicz (incumbent)	729,070	69.78%	+5.56%
Republican	Richard J. Abbate	276,033	26.42%	−7.90
Green	S. Michael DeRosa	17,851	1.71%	N/A
Libertarian	Ken Mosher	13,043	1.25%	−0.21%
Concerned Citizens	Jean Marie Burness	8,874	0.85%	N/A
Total votes		1,044,871	100.0%	
Democratic hold				

==== By congressional district ====
Bysiewicz won all five congressional districts, including one that elected a Republican.

District	Bysiewicz	Abbate	Representative
1st	77%	19%	John B. Larson
2nd	73%	23%	Rob Simmons (109th Congress)
2nd	73%	23%	Joe Courtney (110th Congress)
3rd	73%	23%	Rosa DeLauro
4th	57%	39%	Christopher Shays
5th	67%	29%	Nancy L. Johnson (109th Congress)
5th	67%	29%	Chris Murphy (110th Congress)
