= Miles S. Rapoport =

American politician and nonprofit executive (born 1949)

Secretary of the State of Connecticut
- In office 1995–1999
- Governor: John G. Rowland
- Preceded by: Pauline R. Kezer
- Succeeded by: Susan Bysiewicz

Member of the Connecticut House of Representatives from the 18th district
- In office 1984–1994
- Preceded by: Joan R. Kemler
- Succeeded by: Andy Fleischmann

Personal details
- Born: October 15, 1949 (age 77) Great Neck, New York, US
- Party: Democratic Party
- Education: New York University (BA)
- Occupation: Politician, nonprofit CEO

Miles S. Rapoport (born October 15, 1949) is an American politician who served as Secretary of the State of Connecticut from 1995 to 1999. A progressive Democrat, he went on to serve as president of Demos and Common Cause.

== Early life and education ==
Rapoport was born in Great Neck, New York, to Carl and Florence (Rosenberg) Rapoport. He attended Harvard University for two years before transferring to New York University, graduating with a BA in economics and political science in 1971.

A progressive activist, Rapoport participated in protests against apartheid and the Vietnam War while in college. After receiving his degree, he worked for Massachusetts Fair Share, a public advocacy group. In 1979, Rapoport moved to Connecticut to lead the Connecticut Citizen Action Group, a public advocacy group founded by Ralph Nader.

== Political career ==
Rapoport won election to the Connecticut House of Representatives in 1984, unseating a conservative Democratic incumbent, Joan R. Kemler, in the 18th District of West Hartford. In the House, he campaigned successfully for a progressive state income tax, campaign finance reform, and improved access to the ballot. He also sponsored laws that banned political contributions by lobbyists during legislative sessions, tightened disclosure rules for lobbyists, and allowed citizens to register to vote when they renewed their driver's licenses. He served as an assistant majority leader of the House from 1987 to 1992. As of 1994, he served on the boards of the National Association of Jewish Legislators and the Jewish Funds for Justice.

In 1994, Rapoport ran for the office of Connecticut secretary of state, vowing to expand ballot access for Connecticut's citizens. He narrowly defeated former secretary of state Julia Tashjian in the Democratic primary, winning 53% to 47% after outspending Tashjian 6 to 1 and receiving more than 20 endorsements, including from the state's three largest unions. Endorsed by A Connecticut Party, Rapoport eked out a general election win over Republican nominee Andrea Scott of New Haven, a clerk in the Connecticut House of Representatives. Rapoport received 493,995 votes to Scott's 491,758—a margin of well under 1%.

Instead of seeking reelection as secretary of state, Rapoport ran for an open seat in the US Congress being vacated by Barbara B. Kennelly, who was running for governor. Rapoport came second in the Democratic primary for Connecticut's 1st congressional district in September 1998. Despite support from liberal activists and organized labor, Rapoport's 18,189 votes fell short of the 19,877 votes garnered by moderate Democrat John B. Larson, who went on to win the general election. Following his election defeat, Rapoport formed his own nonprofit advocacy group, Democracy Works, to advance democratic participation, campaign finance reform, and poverty reduction.

== Nonprofit leadership ==
Rapoport was president of liberal think tank Demos (2001–2014) and watchdog group Common Cause (2014–2017). As president of Demos, he served as publisher of The American Prospect. He is currently in his fourth year as the inaugural recipient of the Senior Practice Fellowship in American Democracy at the Ash Center for Democratic Governance and Innovation at the Harvard Kennedy School.

With E. J. Dionne, Rapoport co-authored 100% Democracy: The Case for Universal Voting, to be published by The New Press in March 2022. Publishers Weekly praised the book as a "cogent call for rethinking the electoral process."

== Personal life ==
Rapoport is married to Sandra "Sam" Luciano, a professor at Capital Community College in Hartford. The couple has one son together, Ross Rapoport.

Party political offices
Preceded by Julia Tashjian	Democratic nominee for Secretary of the State of Connecticut; 1994	Succeeded by Susan Bysiewicz
Political offices
Preceded by Pauline R. Kezer	Secretary of the State of Connecticut; 1995–1999	Succeeded by Susan Bysiewicz
