= 2012 United States Senate election in Connecticut =

- November 6, 2012
- Turnout: 60.9% (voting eligible)
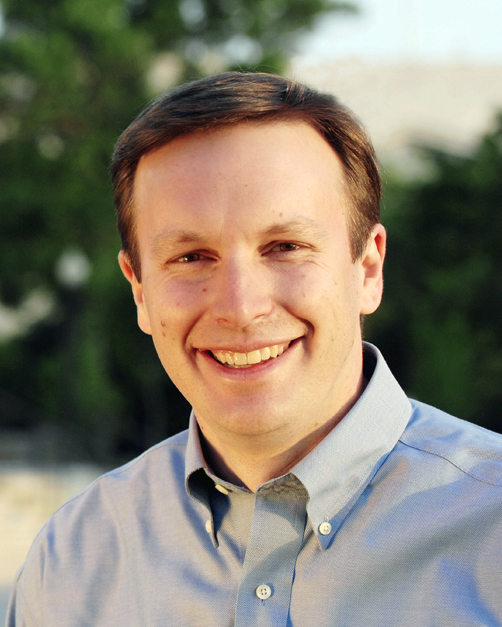

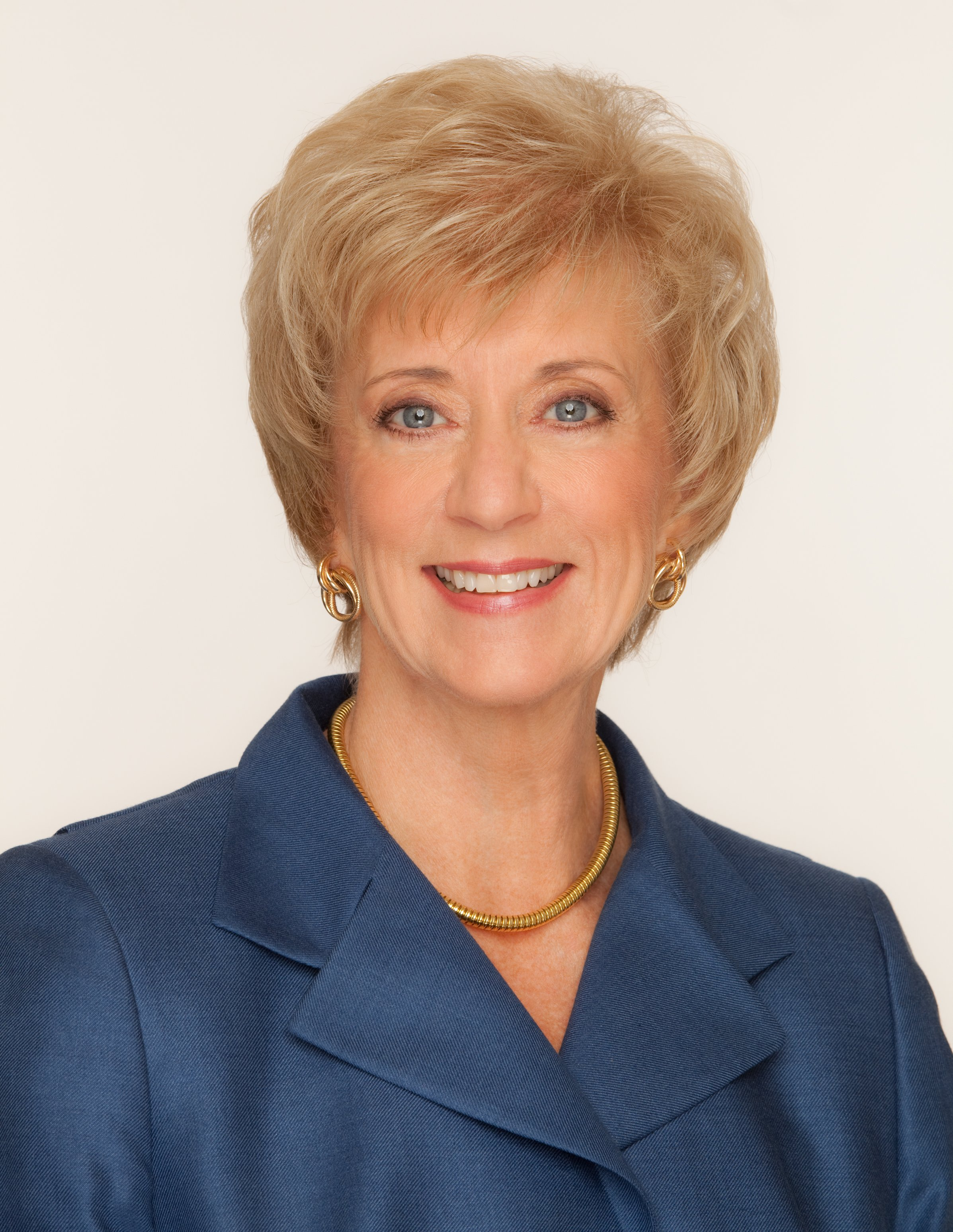
Nominee	Chris Murphy	Linda McMahon
Party	Democratic	Republican
Alliance	Working Families	Independent
Popular vote	828,761	651,089
Percentage	54.82%	43.07%
- Murphy: 40–50% 50–60% 60–70% 70–80% 80–90% McMahon: 40–50% 50–60% 60–70%
U.S. senator before election
Joe Lieberman
Independent
Elected U.S. Senator
Chris Murphy
Democratic

The 2012 United States Senate election in Connecticut was held on November 6, 2012, in conjunction with the 2012 U.S. presidential election, other elections to the United States Senate in other states, elections to the United States House of Representatives, and various state and local elections. Primaries to elect Senate candidates from the Republican and Democratic parties were held on Tuesday, August 14, 2012.

Incumbent U.S. Senator Joe Lieberman, an independent who caucused with the Democratic Party, decided to retire instead of running for re-election to a fifth term. U.S Representative Chris Murphy defeated businesswoman and future Secretary of Education Linda McMahon, marking two defeats for her in two years.

Elected at the age of 39, Chris Murphy would be the youngest senator in the 113th United States Congress. He was sworn in on January 3, 2013, marking the first time since 1967 that Connecticut had an entirely Democratic congressional delegation.

== Background ==
In the 2006 election, incumbent Joe Lieberman was defeated in the Democratic primary by businessman Ned Lamont and formed his own party, Connecticut for Lieberman, winning re-election. Lieberman promised to remain in the Senate Democratic Caucus, but had since stood against the Democrats on many significant issues, including his endorsement of Republican 2008 presidential nominee John McCain over Barack Obama. As a result, Lieberman's poll numbers among Democrats dropped significantly.

Connecticut Attorney General Richard Blumenthal was reportedly considering a run against Lieberman, but instead ran for and won Connecticut's other Senate seat in 2010 after U.S. Senator Christopher Dodd announced his retirement.

Lieberman had publicly floated the possibility of running as a Democrat, Republican, or independent. However, on January 19, 2011, he announced that he would not run for another term.

== Democratic primary ==
=== Candidates ===
==== Declared ====
- Susan Bysiewicz, former Connecticut secretary of state
- Chris Murphy, U.S. representative
- Sylvester Salcedo, attorney
- Lee Whitnum, anti-AIPAC activist and software engineer

==== Withdrawn ====
- Matthew Oakes, activist (endorsed Murphy)
- William Tong, state representative (running for re-election; endorsed Murphy)

=== Debates ===
The first Democratic debate took place on February 23, 2012, with Murphy, Bysiewicz, and Tong participating. The first televised debate was held on April 5, with Murphy, Bysiewicz, Tong, Oakes, and Whitnum participating. A debate was held at UConn on April 9, with the five candidates participating. A debate sponsored by WFSB took place on April 15, with all five taking part.

=== Convention ===
Delegates of the Connecticut Democratic Party endorsed Chris Murphy at their state party convention held on May 12. Murphy was the choice of 1,378 delegates (76 percent), while Susan Bysiewicz won 444 delegates (24 percent), enough to qualify for the August 14 primary. Matthew Oakes received the support of one delegate from Hartford. Lee Whitnum's name was not placed in nomination.

=== Endorsements ===
Chris Murphy

Politicians

- Bill Clinton, 42nd president of the United States
- George Jepsen, Connecticut attorney general
- Kevin Lembo, Connecticut comptroller
- Dan Malloy, Connecticut governor
- Denise Merrill, Connecticut secretary of state
- Matthew Oakes, former U.S. Senate candidate
- Barack Obama, 44th president of the United States
- William Tong, state representative and former U.S. Senate candidate
- Nancy Wyman, Connecticut lieutenant governor

Organizations

- AFL-CIO (American Federation of Labor and Congress of Industrial Organizations)
- Connecticut High School Democrats
- NARAL Pro-Choice America
Susan Bysiewicz
- EMILY's List

=== Polling ===
Poll source	Date(s) administered	Sample size	Margin of error	Susan Bysiewicz	Chris Murphy	William Tong	Other	Undecided
Public Policy Polling	March 17–20, 2011	400	±4.9%	38%	40%	—	—	21%
Quinnipiac	September 8–13, 2011	447	±4.6%	26%	36%	1%	2%	35%
Public Policy Polling	September 22–25, 2011	400	±4.9%	33%	39%	8%	—	19%
Quinnipiac	March 14–19, 2012	640	±3.9%	25%	37%	4%	5%	29%
Quinnipiac	May 29 – June 3, 2012	538	±4.2%	20%	50%	—	5%	24%
Public Policy Polling	July 26–29, 2012	400	±4.9%	32%	49%	—	—	18%

=== Results ===
Results by county: Murphy—70–80% Murphy—60–70% Murphy—50–60%

Democratic primary results
Party	Candidate	Votes	%
Democratic	Chris Murphy	89,283	67.4%
Democratic	Susan Bysiewicz	43,135	32.6%
Total votes		132,418	100.0%

== Republican primary ==
=== Candidates ===
==== Declared ====
- Brian Hill, attorney
- Peter Lumaj, attorney
- Linda McMahon, businesswoman and nominee for the U.S. Senate in 2010
- Chris Shays, former U.S. representative
- Kie Westby, attorney

==== Declined ====
- John Ratzenberger, actor

=== Debates ===
A debate sponsored by the Norwich Bulletin took place on April 19, 2012, with McMahon, Shays, Lumaj, Hill, and Westby in attendance. The debate was not televised. The first televised debate took place on April 22, 2012, sponsored by WFSB. All five candidates participated.

=== Convention ===
Delegates of the Connecticut Republican Party endorsed Linda McMahon at their state party convention held on May 18. McMahon was the choice of 730 delegates (60 percent), while Chris Shays won 389 delegates (32 percent), enough to qualify for the August 14 primary. Brian K. Hill, Peter Lumaj, and Kie Westby did not meet the 15 percent threshold necessary to automatically qualify for the primary, receiving the support of 62, 22, and 5 delegates, respectively. Hill pursued a post-convention attempt to petition his way onto the primary ballot, but fell short of the 8,319 signatures required, and suspended his campaign in June.

=== Endorsements ===
Chris Shays

Politicians

- Penny Bacchiochi, Connecticut state representative from the 52nd district
- Roy Blunt, U.S. senator (R-MO), and former congressman
- Sam Caligiuri, former state senator, and 2010 nominee for Connecticut's 5th congressional district
- Michael Fedele, former Connecticut lieutenant governor
- Mark Lauretti, mayor of Shelton, Connecticut
- John McCain, U.S. senator (R-AZ), and 2008 Republican presidential nominee
- John McKinney, minority leader of the Connecticut Senate
- Dick Morris, political author and Fox News commentator who previously worked as a pollster, political campaign consultant, and general political consultant and former adviser to President Bill Clinton
- Peter Schiff, economist noted for predicting the housing bubble, and 2010 Senate candidate
- Rob Simmons, former U.S. representative for Connecticut's 2nd congressional district

Organizations

- AFL-CIO (American Federation of Labor and Congress of Industrial Organizations)
- League of Conservation Voters

Newspapers

- The Norwich Bulletin's editorial board
Linda McMahon

Politicians

- Mark Boughton, mayor of Danbury and Republican nominee for lieutenant governor in 2010

Organizations

- GOProud
Brian K. Hill

Politicians

- Herman Cain, former CEO of Godfather's Pizza and former 2012 presidential candidate

Organizations

- Republican Liberty Caucus

=== Polling ===
Poll source	Date(s) administered	Sample size	Margin of error	Jason McCoy	Linda McMahon	Chris Shays	Other	Undecided
Quinnipiac	September 8–13, 2011	332	±5.4%	—	50%	35%	2%	12%
Public Policy Polling	September 22–25, 2011	400	±4.9%	3%	60%	27%	—	10%
Quinnipiac	March 14–19, 2012	429	±4.7%	—	51%	42%	1%	6%
Quinnipiac	May 29 – June 3, 2012	381	±5.0%	—	59%	30%	1%	9%
Public Policy Polling	July 26–29, 2012	400	±4.9%	—	68%	20%	—	12%

=== Results ===
Results by county: McMahon—80–90% McMahon—70–80% McMahon—60–70%

Republican primary results
Party	Candidate	Votes	%
Republican	Linda McMahon	83,413	72.7%
Republican	Chris Shays	31,305	27.3%
Total votes		114,718	100.0%

== General election ==
=== Candidates ===
- Linda McMahon (Republican, Independent), businesswoman and nominee for the U.S. Senate in 2010
- Chris Murphy (Democratic, Working Families), U.S. representative
- Paul Passarelli (Libertarian)

=== Campaign ===
Susan Bysiewicz was the first to declare herself as a candidate. However, by March 2011, Chris Murphy had raised over $1 million to Bysiewicz's $500,000. Murphy had won election to Connecticut's 5th congressional district, which is considered Republican-leaning, and he promoted himself as the most electable candidate against a Republican challenger. Bysiewicz, the former secretary of state of Connecticut, enjoyed high name recognition while a statewide officeholder, and had a formidable face-off with Murphy. William Tong, a state representative, joined the race touting his biography as the son of Chinese immigrants working at a Chinese restaurant. In January East Hartford resident Matthew John Oakes announced his candidacy. Oakes pointed to his real-life experience being a disabled American, victim of crime, and civil rights activist, growing up in the inner city and being a political outsider.

Wide speculation continued on Linda McMahon, who had lost in a widely publicized race for senator in 2010. She lost the election decisively, but had strong finances and a well-established political organization. McMahon met with her former campaign consultant to review her 2010 results, and said she was leaning towards running. She planned to make a decision regarding another run after the start of 2012. Former Congressman Chris Shays joined in August 2011, promoting his involvement in Iraq and Afghanistan's military contracting. Shays campaign had also gained traction from a series of independent polls showing him beating or in a dead heat with the top Democratic contenders in the general election, while those same polls showed McMahon losing handily to each of the top Democratic contenders. The Shays campaign quickly capitalized on these polls, arguing for the former congressman's electability while questioning McMahon's electability due to her loss in an open Senate seat contest in 2010 by a large margin despite spending $50 million of her own money. The Shays campaign also cited her high unfavorable numbers among state voters, and the weak fundraising numbers of the McMahon campaign.

In July 2012, Shays declared that he would not support McMahon if she won the primary. He said that he had "never run against an opponent that I have respected less—ever—and there are a lot of candidates I have run against," adding, "I do not believe that Linda McMahon has spent the time, the energy to determine what [being] a senator really means." He also said that during the last debate he had with McMahon, "I thought she was embarrassingly clueless... I think she is a terrible candidate and I think she would make a terrible senator." Although he said he would not support Chris Murphy, he expected him to win the Democratic nomination and the general election.

In September 2012, the records of the McMahons' 1976 bankruptcy and specifics of nearly $1 million in unpaid debts from the proceeding were published. Within days, the candidate and her husband announced the "intention to reimburse all private individual creditors that can be located".

=== Debates ===
- Complete video of debate, October 7, 2012
- Complete video of debate, October 11, 2012
- Complete video of debate, October 16, 2012
- Complete video of debate, October 18, 2012

=== Fundraising ===
Candidate (party)	Receipts	Disbursements	Cash on hand	Debt
Chris Murphy (D)	$10,543,456	$10,436,219	$107,239	$189,925
Linda McMahon (R)	$50,956,502	$50,262,442	$351,464	$1,250,000
Source: Federal Election Commission

==== Top contributors ====
Chris Murphy	Contribution	Linda McMahon	Contribution
Moveon.org	$112,864	Morgan Stanley	$31,050
Yale University	$69,101	Linda McMahon for Senate	$26,174
League of Conservation Voters	$47,388	General Electric	$24,250
Koskoff, Koskoff & Bieder	$44,916	Ott International	$15,000
Travelers Companies	$41,000	Thor Industries	$12,500
Massachusetts Mutual Life Insurance Company	$40,650	JPMorgan Chase & Co.	$11,231
Sullivan & Cromwell	$36,500	Ceci Brothers Inc.	$10,000
Comcast Corporation	$36,000	Invemed Associates	$10,000
Shipman & Goodwin	$35,511	Midstream Partners	$10,000
Northeast Utilities	$34,789	Tudor Investment Corporation	$10,000
Source: OpenSecrets

==== Top industries ====
Chris Murphy	Contribution	Linda McMahon	Contribution
Retired	$1,041,795	Financial institutions	$121,717
Lawyers/law firms	$861,258	Retired	$81,949
Financial institutions	$580,370	Misc. business	$55,302
Real estate	$319,466	Manufacturing & distributing	$46,500
Leadership PACs	$302,500	Misc. finance	$38,050
Insurance industry	$302,025	Business services	$28,932
Health professionals	$285,150	Real estate	$27,000
Democratic/Liberal	$267,018	Republican/Conservative	$25,630
Universities	$232,951	Candidate committees	$24,874
Business services	$228,550	Lawyers/law firms	$24,372
Source: OpenSecrets

=== Predictions ===
Source	Ranking	As of
The Cook Political Report	Tossup	November 1, 2012
Sabato's Crystal Ball	Lean D (flip)	November 5, 2012
Rothenberg Political Report	Lean D (flip)	November 2, 2012
Real Clear Politics	Lean D (flip)	November 5, 2012

=== Polling ===
Poll source	Date(s) administered	Sample size	Margin of error	Chris Murphy (D)	Linda McMahon (R)	Other	Undecided
Public Policy Polling	March 17–20, 2011	822	±3.4%	54%	38%	—	9%
Quinnipiac	September 8–13, 2011	1,230	±2.8%	49%	38%	—	11%
Public Policy Polling	September 22–25, 2011	592	±4.0%	50%	43%	—	6%
Quinnipiac	March 14–19, 2012	1,622	±2.4%	52%	37%	—	9%
Quinnipiac	May 29 – June 3, 2012	1,408	±2.6%	46%	43%	—	9%
Public Policy Polling	July 26–29, 2012	771	±3.5%	50%	42%	—	8%
Rasmussen Reports	August 21, 2012	500	±4.5%	46%	49%	—	5%
Public Policy Polling	August 22–23, 2012	881	±3.3%	48%	44%	—	8%
Quinnipiac	August 22–26, 2012	1,472	±2.6%	46%	49%	—	4%
Univ. of Connecticut/Hartford Courant	September 11–16, 2012	517	±4.0%	37%	33%	1%	28%
Public Policy Polling	September 24–26, 2012	801	±3.5%	48%	42%	—	10%
Quinnipiac University Poll	September 28 – October 2, 2012	1,696	±2.5%	47%	48%	—	5%
Rasmussen Reports	October 7, 2012	500	±4.5%	51%	46%	2%	1%
Siena Research Institute	October 4–14, 2012	552	±4.2%	46%	44%	—	8%
Univ. of Connecticut/Hartford Courant	October 11–16, 2012	574	±4%	44%	38%	—	17%
Public Policy Polling/LCV	October 15–16, 2012	1,015	±3.1%	48%	44%	—	8%
Mason-Dixon	October 15–17, 2012	625	±4%	44%	44%	—	12%
SurveyUSA	October 19–21, 2012	575	±4.2%	47%	43%	3%	4%
Rasmussen Reports	October 21, 2012	500	±4.5%	48%	47%	2%	3%
Quinnipiac	October 19–22, 2012	1,412	±2.6%	49%	43%	1%	7%
Rasmussen Reports	October 28, 2012	500	±4.5%	51%	45%	1%	3%
Public Policy Polling	November 1–2, 2012	1,220	±2.8%	52%	43%	—	4%

Hypothetical polling

With Mark Boughton

Poll source	Date(s) administered	Sample size	Margin of error	Susan Bysiewicz (D)	Mark Boughton (R)	Undecided
Public Policy Polling	March 17–20, 2011	822	±3.4%	44%	34%	22%

Poll source	Date(s) administered	Sample size	Margin of error	Chris Murphy (D)	Mark Boughton (R)	Undecided
Public Policy Polling	March 17–20, 2011	822	±3.4%	52%	29%	19%

With Susan Bysiewicz

Poll source	Date(s) administered	Sample size	Margin of error	Susan Bysiewicz (D)	Linda McMahon (R)	Undecided
Public Policy Polling	March 17–20, 2011	822	±3.4%	50%	39%	12%
Quinnipiac	September 8–13, 2011	1,230	±2.8%	46%	38%	12%
Public Policy Polling	September 22–25, 2011	592	±4.0%	47%	46%	7%
Quinnipiac	March 14–19, 2012	1,622	±2.4%	49%	39%	9%
Quinnipiac	May 29 – June 3, 2012	1,408	±2.6%	42%	46%	9%
Public Policy Polling	July 26–29, 2012	771	±3.5%	45%	42%	13%

With Michael Fedele

Poll source	Date(s) administered	Sample size	Margin of error	Susan Bysiewicz (D)	Michael Fedele (R)	Undecided
Public Policy Polling	March 17–20, 2011	822	±3.4%	45%	35%	20%

Poll source	Date(s) administered	Sample size	Margin of error	Chris Murphy (D)	Michael Fedele (R)	Undecided
Public Policy Polling	March 17–20, 2011	822	±3.4%	51%	29%	20%

With Scott Frantz

Poll source	Date(s) administered	Sample size	Margin of error	Susan Bysiewicz (D)	Scott Frantz (R)	Undecided
Public Policy Polling	March 17–20, 2011	822	±3.4%	45%	30%	24%

Poll source	Date(s) administered	Sample size	Margin of error	Chris Murphy (D)	Scott Frantz (R)	Undecided
Public Policy Polling	March 17–20, 2011	822	±3.4%	51%	27%	22%

With Joe Lieberman

Poll source	Date(s) administered	Sample size	Margin of error	Joe Lieberman (I)	Chris Murphy (D)	Peter Schiff (R)	Undecided
Public Policy Polling	September 30 – October 2, 2010	810	±3.4%	19%	39%	25%	17%

Poll source	Date(s) administered	Sample size	Margin of error	Joe Lieberman (I)	Chris Murphy (D)	Jodi Rell (R)	Undecided
Research 2000	January 11–13, 2010	600	±4.0%	23%	25%	47%	2%
Research 2000	January 11–13, 2010	810	±3.4%	33%	47%	—	20%
Public Policy Polling	September 30 – October 2, 2010	810	±3.4%	17%	37%	29%	17%

Poll source	Date(s) administered	Sample size	Margin of error	Joe Lieberman (I)	Ned Lamont (D)	Jodi Rell (R)	Undecided
Research 2000	March 23–25, 2008	600	±4.0%	25%	30%	42%	2%
Research 2000	September 8–10, 2009	600	±4.0%	26%	26%	46%	2%

Poll source	Date(s) administered	Sample size	Margin of error	Joe Lieberman (I)	Ned Lamont (D)	Alan Schlesinger (R)	Undecided
Research 2000	March 31 – April 2, 2008	600	±4.0%	37%	51%	7%	5%
Research 2000	June 30 – July 2, 2008	600	±4.0%	36%	51%	7%	6%
Research 2000	November 11–13, 2008	600	±4.0%	34%	59%	3%	2%

With Chris Shays

Poll source	Date(s) administered	Sample size	Margin of error	Susan Bysiewicz (D)	Chris Shays (R)	Undecided
Quinnipiac	September 8–13, 2011	1,230	±2.8%	40%	42%	16%
Public Policy Polling	September 22–25, 2011	592	±4.0%	37%	48%	16%
Quinnipiac	March 14–19, 2012	1,622	±2.4%	42%	43%	13%
Quinnipiac	May 29 – June 3, 2012	1,408	±2.6%	40%	44%	11%
Public Policy Polling	July 26–29, 2012	771	±3.5%	40%	43%	17%

Poll source	Date(s) administered	Sample size	Margin of error	Chris Murphy (D)	Chris Shays (R)	Undecided
Quinnipiac	September 8–13, 2011	1,230	±2.8%	43%	37%	17%
Public Policy Polling	September 22–25, 2011	592	±4.0%	43%	39%	18%
Quinnipiac	March 14–19, 2012	1,622	±2.4%	41%	40%	17%
Quinnipiac	May 29 – June 3, 2012	1,408	±2.6%	45%	37%	15%
Public Policy Polling	July 26–29, 2012	771	±3.5%	47%	38%	15%

With Rob Simmons

Poll source	Date(s) administered	Sample size	Margin of error	Susan Bysiewicz (D)	Rob Simmons (R)	Undecided
Public Policy Polling	March 17–20, 2011	822	±3.4%	42%	39%	19%
Public Policy Polling	September 22–25, 2011	592	±4.0%	41%	42%	17%

Poll source	Date(s) administered	Sample size	Margin of error	Chris Murphy (D)	Rob Simmons (R)	Undecided
Public Policy Polling	March 17–20, 2011	822	±3.4%	49%	34%	18%
Public Policy Polling	September 22–25, 2011	592	±4.0%	45%	36%	20%

Poll source	Date(s) administered	Sample size	Margin of error	William Tong (D)	Rob Simmons (R)	Undecided
Public Policy Polling	September 22–25, 2011	592	±4.0%	32%	39%	29%

With William Tong

Poll source	Date(s) administered	Sample size	Margin of error	William Tong (D)	Linda McMahon (R)	Undecided
Public Policy Polling	September 22–25, 2011	592	±4.0%	38%	45%	17%
Quinnipiac	March 14–19, 2012	1,622	±2.4%	39%	43%	9%

Poll source	Date(s) administered	Sample size	Margin of error	William Tong (D)	Chris Shays (R)	Undecided
Public Policy Polling	September 22–25, 2011	592	±4.0%	27%	46%	27%
Quinnipiac	March 14–19, 2012	1,622	±2.4%	25%	50%	21%

=== Results ===
County flips: Democratic Flip from Independent / Republican Flip from Independent

United States Senate election in Connecticut, 2012
Party	Candidate	Votes	%	±%
Democratic	Chris Murphy	792,983	52.45%	+12.72%
Working Families	Chris Murphy	35,778	2.37%	N/A
Total	Chris Murphy	828,761	54.82%	+15.09%
Republican	Linda McMahon	604,569	39.99%	+30.37%
Independent Party	Linda McMahon	46,520	3.08%	N/A
Total	Linda McMahon	651,089	43.07%	+33.45%
Libertarian	Paul Passarelli	25,045	1.66%	N/A
Write-in		6,869	0.45%	+0.45%
Total votes		1,511,764	100.00%	N/A
Democratic gain from Independent Democrat				

==== By county ====
County	Chris Murphy Democratic		Linda McMahon Republican		Various candidates Other parties		Total votes cast	
County	Fairfield	202,539	52.34%	179,440	46.37%	4,984	1.29%	386,963
Hartford	224,187	59.17%	148,754	39.26%	5,953	1.57%	378,894	
Litchfield	39,577	44.28%	48,316	54.05%	1,492	1.67%	89,385	
Middlesex	43,591	53.96%	35,474	43.91%	1,716	2.12%	80,781	
New Haven	199,779	57.62%	141,408	40.78%	5,530	1.59%	346,717	
New London	60,595	55.43%	46,056	42.13%	2,667	2.44%	109,318	
Tolland	35,781	52.4%	30,877	45.22%	1,621	2.37%	68,279	
Windham	22,712	50.97%	20,764	46.6%	1,082	2.43%	44,558	
Total	828,761	54.82%	651,089	43.07%	31,914	2.11%	1,511,764	

Counties that flipped from Independent to Democratic

- Fairfield (largest town: Bridgeport)
- Hartford (largest town: Hartford)
- Middlesex (largest town: Middletown)
- New Haven (largest town: New Haven)
- New London (largest town: Norwich)
- Tolland (largest town: Vernon)
- Windham (largest town: Windham)

Counties that flipped from Independent to Republican

- Litchfield (largest city: Torrington)

==== By congressional district ====
Murphy won all five congressional districts.

District	Murphy	McMahon	Representative
1st	60%	39%	John B. Larson
2nd	53%	45%	Joe Courtney
3rd	60%	39%	Rosa DeLauro
4th	52%	46%	Jim Himes
5th	51%	48%	Elizabeth Esty

== See also ==
- 2012 United States Senate elections
- 2012 United States House of Representatives elections in Connecticut
