= Pauline R. Kezer =

American politician (born 1942)

Secretary of the State of Connecticut
- In office 1991–1995
- Governor: Lowell Weicker
- Preceded by: Julia Tashjian
- Succeeded by: Miles S. Rapoport

Member of the Connecticut House of Representatives from the 22nd district
- In office 1979–1987
- Preceded by: Joseph M. Pugliese
- Succeeded by: Eugene Millerick

Personal details
- Born: Pauline Ryder; February 4, 1942 (age 84) Waltham, Massachusetts, U.S.
- Party: Republican Party
- Spouse: Kenneth Kezer
- Education: Colby College (BA)
- Occupation: Politician

Pauline Ryder Kezer (born February 4, 1942) is an American politician who served as Secretary of the State of Connecticut from 1991 to 1995. She previously served in the Connecticut General Assembly. Since August 2014 she has served as president of the Alden Kindred of America, which owns and operates the John and Priscilla Alden Family Sites.

== Early life and education ==
Kezer was born Pauline Ryder to a working-class family in Waltham, Massachusetts, on February 4, 1942. She attended Waltham High School and received a Bachelor of Arts degree in psychology, with a minor in biology, from Colby College. She met her future husband, Kenneth Kezer, while both were attending high school. In 1964, the couple married and moved to Plainville, Connecticut. Ken Kezer coached baseball for 41 years and football for 21 years at New Britain High School.

Pauline Kezer worked as a science teacher from 1964 to 1979 and volunteered for the local Republican Party. She started out in local politics by helping to found the Plainville Inland Wetlands Commission and later chairing the commission.

== Political career ==
In 1978, with the support of state senator Nancy Johnson, Kezer won the Republican primary and went on to score an upset general election victory in her Democratic-leaning Connecticut House of Representatives district. She served in the House from 1979 to 1986, when she resigned in order to run for the office of Secretary of State. She lost to Democratic incumbent Julia Tashjian. While in the House, Kezer served as assistant majority and minority leader for six years, as president of the Connecticut Order of Women Legislators, and as chair of the New England Caucus of Women Legislators.

From 1987 to 1989, she served as vice chair of the Connecticut Republican Party. In 1990, she was a Fellow at the Institute of Politics at Harvard Kennedy School. In 1990, she ran again for Secretary of State, this time defeating Julia Tashjian by a margin of 5% of the vote despite being outspent 5–1 during the campaign. Kezer served a full four-year term as Secretary of State from 1991 to 1995. As secretary, she operated the office at a budgetary surplus each year, reduced the waiting time for information requests from 6 months to 5 days, and computerized many of the state's business records as well as voter lists.

In 1994, Kezer opted to run for governor in 1994 rather than seek reelection. Considered a moderate Republican, she backed abortion rights and campaign finance reform but vowed as governor to veto any state budget that did not cut spending by 10%. Running as an outsider, Kezer campaigned hard and clashed with influential Republicans rapidly coalescing around John G. Rowland's candidacy. Kezer lost the Republican primary to Rowland, who won 68% of the vote to Kezer's 32%.

== Later career ==
Following her departure from political office, Kezer was CEO of the Hartford Ballet from September 1995 to June 1997. She was appointed as an assistant state treasurer, serving from 1997 to 1999, and founded a small independent consulting firm, Kezer Consulting, for several years. In 2004, she was elected president of the state chapter of the Susan G. Komen Breast Cancer Foundation. She had a long history with the association and helped found the Connecticut Race for the Cure in 1992. In addition, she served nine years on the National Board of Directors for the Girl Scouts of the USA and served as president, vice president, and treasurer of the New Britain YWCA.

Kezer taught a course on Women, Advocacy, and Political Change at Central Connecticut State University and is a member of the Governor William A. O'Neill Archives Committee at CCSU's Center for Social Policy. She is a trustee and vice president of the Katharine Hepburn Cultural Arts Center and is a member of the Old Saybrook Republican Town Committee.

== Personal life ==
Kezer and her husband have three daughters: Anne, Pam, and Cindy. Kezer survived breast cancer in 1999. She and her husband live in Old Saybrook, Connecticut.

Party political offices
Preceded by Michael L. Werner	Republican nominee for Secretary of the State of Connecticut; 1986, 1990	Succeeded by Andrea Scott
Political offices
Preceded by Julia Tashjian	Secretary of State of Connecticut; 1991–1995	Succeeded by Miles S. Rapoport
