= Connecticut Education Association =

Teachers association

The Connecticut Education Association (CEA) is the largest union of public school teachers in the US state of Connecticut, with approximately 43,000 members. The CEA, headquartered in Hartford, is a state affiliate of the National Education Association, the largest labor union in the United States.

== Structure and operation ==
CEA's members are public school teachers, including preschool through grade 12 teachers in Connecticut public schools as well as retired teachers and college students preparing to become teachers. CEA has more than 160 local affiliates and is governed by a board of directors of approximately 35 elected members. The board meets regularly throughout the year to set goals, approve policy, and implement specific measures adopted by CEA's highest-policy making body, the Representative Assembly (RA).

== Accomplishments ==
CEA actively lobbies the state legislature, advocating for increased funding for public schools. In the first quarter of 2025, the CEA's spending on lobbying of the Connecticut state government ranked third among all organizations.
