= Susan Bysiewicz =

American politician (born 1961)

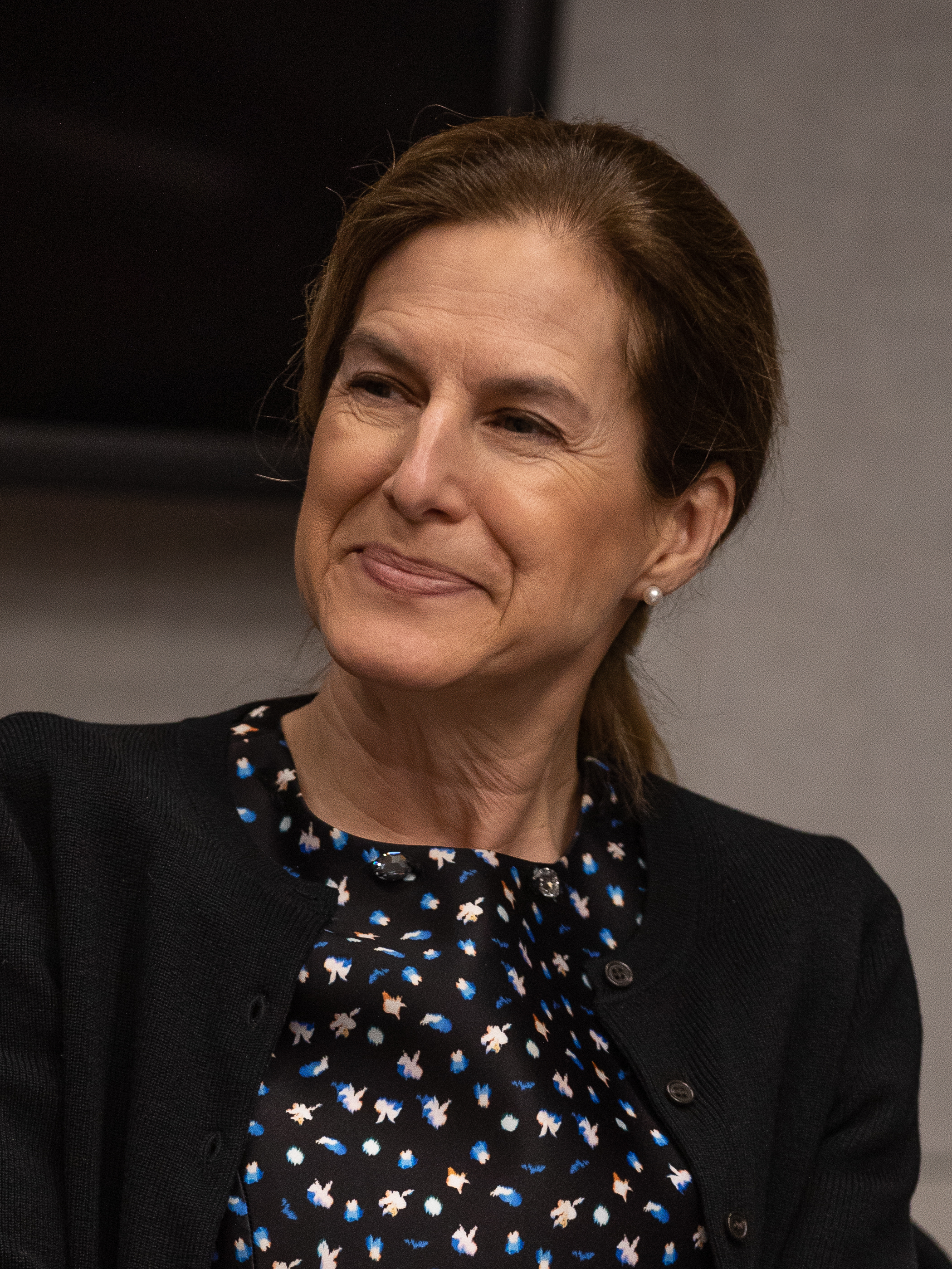
- Bysiewicz in 2023

109th Lieutenant Governor of Connecticut
- Incumbent
- Assumed office January 9, 2019
- Governor: Ned Lamont
- Preceded by: Nancy Wyman

72nd Secretary of the State of Connecticut
- In office January 3, 1999 – January 3, 2011
- Governor: John G. Rowland; Jodi Rell
- Preceded by: Miles S. Rapoport
- Succeeded by: Denise Merrill

Member of the Connecticut House of Representatives from the 100th district
- In office January 3, 1993 – January 3, 1999
- Preceded by: David Lavine
- Succeeded by: Theodore Raczka

Personal details
- Born: September 29, 1961 (age 64) New Haven, Connecticut, U.S.
- Party: Democratic
- Spouse: David Donaldson
- Children: 3
- Education: Yale University (BA); Duke University (JD)

Susan Bysiewicz (/ˈbaɪzəwɪts/ BYE-zə-wits; born September 29, 1961) is an American politician and attorney who has served as the 109th lieutenant governor of Connecticut since 2019. She previously served as the 72nd secretary of the state of Connecticut from 1999 to 2011 and a member of the Connecticut House of Representatives from 1993 to 1999.

She was briefly a candidate for governor of Connecticut in 2010, before dropping out to run for Connecticut Attorney General. She was disqualified from running for the office by the Connecticut Supreme Court and announced in 2011 that she was running for the United States Senate in the 2012 election to replace the retiring Joe Lieberman but lost the Democratic primary to U.S. Representative Chris Murphy, who went on to win the general election.

In 2018, Bysiewicz filed papers to run for governor of Connecticut but withdrew shortly before the Democratic Convention, in order to run for lieutenant governor as Ned Lamont's running mate. She was nominated for lieutenant governor during the state primary.

== Early life, education and law career ==
Bysiewicz was born September 29, 1961, in New Haven and raised on a farm. The daughter of Stan and Shirley Bysiewicz, she was raised by a Catholic family of Polish and Greek descent in Middletown, Connecticut. She received her Bachelor of Arts from Yale University and her Juris Doctor from Duke University School of Law. During law school, she wrote Ella: A Biography of Governor Ella Grasso. Bysiewicz practiced law in New York City for two years as an associate of White & Case (1986–88). In 1988 she became associated with the Hartford firm of Robinson & Cole, L.L.C. where she practiced for four years, and then joined the legal department of Aetna where she was employed from 1992 to 1994.

== Connecticut House of Representatives (1993–1999) ==
=== Elections ===
After the redistricting that followed the 1990 Federal Census, she decided to run in the newly redrawn Connecticut's 100th Assembly District, and defeated Republican Joseph Milardo by a margin of 61–39%. She was a part of the largest Freshman class of the state legislature since 1974. In 1994, she won re-election to a second term with 67% of the vote. In 1996, she won re-election to a third term with 66% of the vote.

=== Tenure ===
Bysiewicz was elected state representative for the 100th Assembly District of Connecticut for three successive terms starting in 1992, representing until 1998 about 22,000 constituents living in parts of the towns of Middletown (64% of her constituents) and Middlefield (10%), and throughout the town of Durham (26%).

In the House, she investigated the political power of County Sheriffs, Connecticut's last vestige of patronage politics at the local level. The sheriffs were political positions within Connecticut county governments, which were eliminated in 1960. Democrats controlled the Hartford County Sheriff's Department, for example, and of the 288 deputy and special deputy sheriffs working, the Program Review and Investigations Committee found just two Republicans.

=== Committee assignments ===
- Connecticut Ethics Commission (Co-Chairwoman)
- House Government Administration Committee (Chairwoman)
- House Elections Committee
- House Judicial Committee

== Connecticut Secretary of the State (1999–2011) ==
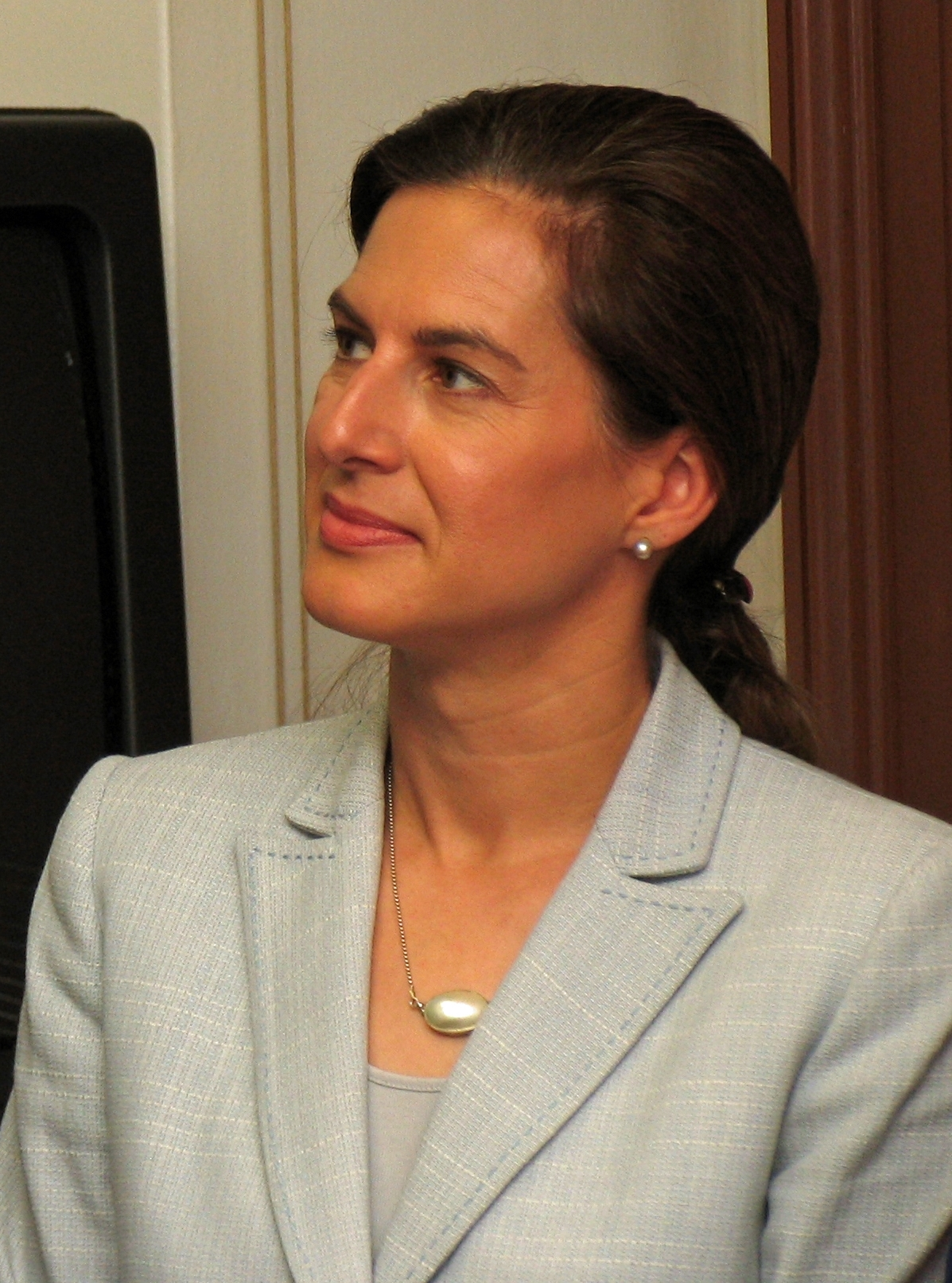
Bysiewicz in 2009

In 1998, Bysiewicz sought the Democratic nomination for Secretary of the State. At the state Democratic Convention, she lost the party's endorsement to Representative Ellen Scalettar, but won enough delegates' votes to qualify to run for the nomination in a primary. During the primary campaign, she charged her opponent opposed Megan's Law and was soft on sex offenders. She won both the nomination, and, in the general election in November, the office itself. She won re-election in 2002, but in 2005, while serving, she announced her candidacy for the Democratic nomination for the gubernatorial election of 2006. She withdrew from that race in September 2005, and on November 7, 2006, won a third term (running through 2010) as Secretary of the State.

In her time as the chief elections officer and business registrar of the state, she has made technology a focus of her administration. Bysiewicz developed Connecticut's first electronic filing system for voter registration to prevent fraud and encourage registration. She also instituted an electronic business searching system called CONCORD that allows users to search a database of all the registered companies in the State of Connecticut. In 2006-07, she implemented new voting technology including adoption of the optical scan machine and a vote-by-phone procedure so that Connecticut voters with disabilities are able to vote securely and independently. She advocated with success at the legislature for the passage of a constitutional amendment that would allow 17-year-olds to vote in primaries.

=== Public record investigation ===
On February 7, 2010, the Hartford Courant reported that Attorney General Blumenthal was investigating whether Bysiewicz violated the law by using e-mail addresses obtained by her office in their official duties for campaign use—soliciting campaign support and donations. In September, both Blumenthal and Chief State's Attorney Kevin Kane concluded that she had not broken the law, and that no charges were warranted.

== 2010 elections ==
=== Gubernatorial campaign ===
On January 27, 2009, Bysiewicz made public her intention to seek the Democratic nomination for governor of Connecticut in the 2010 election.

That February, Quinnipiac University conducted a poll in which they asked: "If the Democratic primary for governor were being held today and the candidates were Dannel Malloy, Susan Bysiewicz and Jim Amann, for whom would you vote?" Of the Democrats who responded, 44% said they would vote for Secretary of the State Susan Bysiewicz, 12% said they would vote for Stamford Mayor Dannel Malloy and 4% said they would vote for James Amann, former Speaker of the House.

In a poll conducted by the Susan Bysiewicz gubernatorial exploratory committee in October 2009, support for incumbent governor Jodi Rell fell to 47% in a head-to-head contest with Susan Bysiewicz, who received 41% of the respondents' vote. When asked how they would vote if the election was held between Rell and Stamford Mayor Dannel Malloy, poll respondents said they would vote 52% for Rell and 31% for Malloy. In Bridgeport alone, those taking part in the poll were asked who they would vote for if the primary were held that day and they said Bysiewicz 31.44 percent, Malloy 14.56 percent.

In January 2010 Bysiewicz dropped her bid for governor, choosing to run for attorney general. On January 21, 2010, Quinnipiac University released its results a poll of the primary for attorney general which found that Susan Bysiewicz had a 52-point lead (Bysiewicz 62, Jepsen 10, Undecided 24, 593 Democratic Voters, MOE +/- 4%).

=== Attorney general campaign ===
After Bysiewicz announced her bid for attorney general, a number of observers questioned her legal qualification to hold the post, citing a state statute that requires the attorney general to have spent ten years in "active practice" of law. Bysiewicz claimed that her years managing the Secretary of the State's office should be applied against this requirement. She sought an opinion from the current attorney general, Richard Blumenthal on the issue. Blumenthal responded that he believed the law to be valid, but the question as to whether Bysiewicz met the requirements had to be decided by the courts or the legislature.

Bysiewicz also had to explain filing a form seeking a waiver of a state fee, when she claimed not to be actively practicing law. Her spokesperson said she had made a mistake. While Bysiewicz vowed to continue her campaign despite the qualifications controversy prominent Republicans suggested she was "cooked" and "delusional."

Under deposition on March 31, 2010, Bysiewicz admitted that "she has never argued a case before a judge and couldn't remember being in a courtroom to observe litigation since law school." On May 5, 2010, Superior Court Judge Michael Sheldon ruled that Bysiewicz was legally qualified to run for state attorney general. However, when the case reached the Connecticut Supreme Court on May 18, Justice Flemming L. Norcott Jr. handed down the court's 7-0 unanimous ruling that Bysiewicz failed to meet the requirements of General Statutes Section 3-124, which outlines the qualifications for state attorney general. In consequence, Bysiewicz was unable run for attorney general in 2010, leaving former State Senator George Jepsen the sole remaining Democratic candidate in the race, which he subsequently won.

==== Early call of gubernatorial election ====
On November 3, one day after the general election, Bysiewicz announced that Democratic candidate Dannel Malloy was the unofficial winner of the race, beating Republican Tom Foley. Later that evening the Associated Press, who had also called the race largely based on Bysiewicz's announcement, "un-called" the race when it found that Foley actually led in its vote count. One major reason for the election discrepancies was the conduct of the election in Bridgeport, where local officials ordered an inadequate number of ballots to meet turnout.

President Obama had paid a last minute visit to the City of Bridgeport, and introduced Dannel Malloy, and the resulting increase in ballot requirements took the local election board by surprise. Bridgeport Democratic Registrar of Voters Santa Ayala, one of two officials responsible for ordering the ballots, noted that other communities ran out of ballots. She disputed the widely quoted figure of 21,000 ordered ballots, but didn't provide an alternative number. Ayala said, "We base the number of ballots we order on prior elections. The Republican and Democratic registrars agreed on that number.". Bysiewicz cited these counting delays—including a bag of uncounted ballots found after Election Day—caused by the ballot shortages in Bridgeport for the confusion; despite her role as Chief Elections Officer she denied bearing any responsibility for the ballot shortages. Bysiewicz said she had directed local officials to order enough ballots but had not monitored Bridgeport officials to ensure the directive was followed, as she had no legal authority to do so.

Bysiewicz answered Tom Foley directly, on a local Connecticut NPR radio program, who complained that she had improperly announced a winner. Bysiewicz argued that she had made it clear the results were "unofficial", and that she was merely "sharing information"; she promised to send Foley any information he required upon his request.

She had planned to announce the official winner of the election on Friday, November 5, after receiving all of the official ballot results. Late in the afternoon of Friday, November 5, Bysiewicz announced Dannel Malloy as the official winner in the gubernatorial election by a much larger vote total of 5,637 votes, which differed from the early results announcement two days earlier when she declared Malloy the unofficial winner by 3,103 votes.

== 2012 U.S. Senate election ==
On January 18, 2011, Bysiewicz announced her candidacy in the 2012 election for the U.S. Senate seat which had been held by Joe Lieberman, who retired at the end of that term. Her campaign was endorsed by numerous elected officials as well as the political action committee EMILY's List. Bysiewicz was subsequently defeated by US Representative Chris Murphy, who defeated Republican Linda McMahon in the general election.

Two years later, Bysiewicz returned to private practice, joining the newly established New York and Stamford law firm of Pastore Shofi & Dailey, where she headed their new Glastonbury office. Her practice concentration consisted of "corporate law and finance, banking, securities and contract negotiation." Bysiewicz said that while she did not have "any immediate plans to pursue public office" she would not rule out re-entering politics.

== Lieutenant Governor of Connecticut (2019–present) ==
On April 18, 2017, Bysiewicz announced that she was forming an exploratory committee for a possible race for Connecticut's 13th senate district. She said that since the election in 2016 of Len Suzio, the first Republican elected in the district which encompasses the cities of Middletown and Meriden for several decades, she had been prevailed on by many Democrats eager to regain the seat. (The 2016 election tied the state senate at 18-18.) Bysiewicz attacked Suzio as an "extremist" pointing to his sponsorship of a bill requiring parental notification for minors seeking abortion.

On April 3, 2018, she announced her intention to run for Governor of Connecticut. In early May Bysiewicz received the endorsement of the Democratic PAC EMILY's List. Despite the access to a national donor's network and assistance on social media and other platforms that the PAC provided, Bysciewicz dropped out of the governor's race the week before the state Democratic convention and teamed with candidate Ned Lamont to run on a ticket as his running mate. To do so, however, would require that both she and Lamont obtain the party's nominations, and as of the date of the announcement, May 15, 2018, Bridgeport mayor Joseph P. Ganim and former commissioner of the state Department of Veterans Affairs Sean Connolly were seeking places on the party's primary ballot for governor and state senator Gary Winfield of New Haven and Eva Bermudez Zimmerman, a union organizer from Newtown, planned to contest the nomination for lieutenant governor.

Bysiewicz is the chair of the Connecticut Complete Count Committee for the 2020 Census, and of the Governor's Council on Women and Girls, a platform for women engaged in politics and public policy.

== Personal life ==
Bysiewicz met her husband, David Donaldson, while she was attending law school at Duke. Donaldson ran his father's insurance business in Manchester, now the Bysiewicz/Donaldson Agency. The couple has three children, daughters Ava and Leyna, who attended Wesleyan University, and son Tristan, who was graduated from Middletown High School.

Party political offices
Preceded by Miles S. Rapoport	Democratic nominee for Secretary of the State of Connecticut; 1998, 2002, 2006	Succeeded by Denise Merrill
Preceded by Nancy Wyman	Democratic nominee for Lieutenant Governor of Connecticut; 2018, 2022	Most recent
Political offices
Preceded by Miles S. Rapoport	Secretary of State of Connecticut; 1999–2011	Succeeded by Denise Merrill
Preceded by Nancy Wyman	Lieutenant Governor of Connecticut; 2019–present	Incumbent
