= Connecticut's 54th House of Representatives district =

American legislative district

Connecticut's 54th State House of Representatives district
Representative
Gregory Haddad; D

Connecticut's 54th House of Representatives district elects one member of the Connecticut House of Representatives. Its current representative is Democrat Gregory Haddad. The district consists of the towns of Mansfield, which includes the Storrs campus of the University of Connecticut, and Chaplin, which was added to the district in 2001.

== List of representatives ==
List of Representatives from Connecticut's 54th State House District
Representative	Party	Years	District home	Note
Jotham G. Reynolds	Republican	1967–1971	Woodstock	Seat created
Charles C. Grab	Republican	1971–1973	Canterbury	
Audrey P. Beck	Democratic	1973–1975	Mansfield	Elected State Senator
Dorothy Goodwin	Democratic	1975–1985	Mansfield	Did not seek reelection
Jonathan Pelto	Democratic	1985–1995	Mansfield	Did not seek reelection
Denise Merrill	Democratic	1995–2011	Mansfield	Elected secretary of the state of Connecticut
Gregory Haddad	Democratic	2011–	Mansfield	Incumbent

== Recent elections ==
State election 2010 candidates: House District 54
Party	Candidate	Votes	%	±%
Democratic	Gregory Haddad	3,737	58.4	−41.6
Republican	Christopher R. Paulhus	1,461	22.8	+22.8
Independent	Jason J. Ortiz	909	14.2	+14.2
Working Families	Gregory Haddad	193	3.0	+3.0
Buckman for Connecticut	Brien T. Buckman	98	1.5	+1.5
Majority		2,276	35.6	−64.4
Turnout		6,398		
Democratic hold		Swing	-38.6	

State election 2008: House District 54
Party	Candidate	Votes	%	±%
Democratic	Denise Merrill	8,781	100.0	
Majority		8,781	100.0	+0.0
Turnout		10,392		
Democratic hold		Swing	-38.4	

State election 2006: House District 54
Party	Candidate	Votes	%	±%
Democratic	Denise Merrill	5,592	94.5	+0.0
Working Families	Denise Merrill	324	5.5	+0.0
Majority		5,916	100.0	+11.0
Turnout		5,916		
Democratic hold		Swing	+5.5	

State election 2004: House District 54
Party	Candidate	Votes	%	±%
Democratic	Denise Merrill	6,312	94.5	+24.8
Working Families	Magdalena L. Russell	367	5.5	+5.5
Majority		5,945	89.0	+35.1
Turnout		6,679		
Democratic hold		Swing	+19.3	

State election 2002: House District 54
Party	Candidate	Votes	%	±%
Democratic	Denise Merrill	3,959	76.9	−23.1
Republican	John B. Thacher	1,186	23.1	+23.1
Majority		2,773	53.9	−57.9
Turnout		5,145		
Democratic hold		Swing	-23.1	

State election 2000: House District 54
Party	Candidate	Votes	%	±%
Democratic	Denise Merrill	4,506	100.0	+0.0
Majority		4,506	100.0	+0.0
Turnout		4,506		
Democratic hold		Swing	+0.0	

State election 1998: House District 54
Party	Candidate	Votes	%	±%
Democratic	Denise Merrill	3,384	100.0	+0.0
Majority		3,384	100.0	+0.0
Turnout		3,384		
Democratic hold		Swing	+0.0	

State election 1996: House District 54
Party	Candidate	Votes	%	±%
Democratic	Denise Merrill	4,748	100.0	+45.1
Majority		4,748	100.0	+0.0
Turnout		4,748		
Democratic hold		Swing	+23.0	

State election 1994: House District 54
Party	Candidate	Votes	%	±%
Democratic	Denise Merrill	2,740	54.9	+5.3
Republican	David Dyer	1,147	23.0	−7.1
A Connecticut Party (1990)	Denise Merrill	1,103	22.1	+1.8
Majority		2,696	54.0	+14.2
Turnout		4,990		
Democratic hold		Swing	+7.1	

State election 1992: House District 54
Party	Candidate	Votes	%	±%
Democratic	Jonathan Pelto	3,468	49.6	−50.4
Republican	Richard Pellegrine	2,103	30.1	+30.1
A Connecticut Party (1990)	Jonathan Pelto	1,415	20.3	+20.3
Majority		2,780	39.8	−60.2
Turnout		6,986		
Democratic hold		Swing		

State election 1990: House District 54
Party	Candidate	Votes	%	±%
Democratic	Jonathan Pelto	3,577	100.0	+31.5
Majority		3,577	100.0	+36.9
Turnout		3,577		
Democratic hold		Swing	+31.5	

State election 1988: House District 54
Party	Candidate	Votes	%	±%
Democratic	Jonathan Pelto	4,487	68.5	+3.2
Republican	Jason W. Bartlett	2,067	31.5	−3.2
Majority		2,420	36.9	+6.3
Turnout		6,554		
Democratic hold		Swing	+3.2	

State election 1986: House District 54
Party	Candidate	Votes	%	±%
Democratic	Jonathan Pelto	2,748	65.3	+11.7
Republican	Edwin E. Passmore	1,460	34.7	−11.7
Majority		1,288	30.6	+23.4
Turnout		4,208		
Democratic hold		Swing	+11.7	

State election 1984: House District 54
Party	Candidate	Votes	%	±%
Democratic	Jonathan Pelto	3,610	53.6	+2.3
Republican	George E. Whitham	3,128	46.4	−2.3
Majority		482	7.2	+4.6
Turnout		6,738		
Democratic hold		Swing	+2.3	

State election 1982: House District 54
Party	Candidate	Votes	%	±%
Democratic	Dorothy C. Goodwin	2,364	51.3	−11.7
Republican	George E. Whitham	2,244	48.7	+11.7
Majority		120	2.6	−23.4
Turnout		4,608		
Democratic hold		Swing	-11.7	

State election 1980: House District 54
Party	Candidate	Votes	%	±%
Democratic	Dorothy C. Goodwin	3,714	63.0	−4.7
Republican	George E. Whitham	2,182	37.0	+4.7
Majority		1,532	26.0	−9.5
Turnout		5,896		
Democratic hold		Swing	-4.7	

State election 1978: House District 54
Party	Candidate	Votes	%	±%
Democratic	Dorothy C. Goodwin	2,697	67.7	+3.6
Republican	Emily F. Albee	1,284	32.3	−3.6
Majority		1,413	35.5	+7.2
Turnout		3,981		
Democratic hold		Swing	+3.6	

State election 1976: House District 54
Party	Candidate	Votes	%	±%
Democratic	Dorothy C. Goodwin	3,473	64.1	−1.1
Republican	Robert Fisk, Jr.	1,942	35.9	+1.1
Majority		1,531	28.3	−2.2
Turnout		5,415		
Democratic hold		Swing	-1.1	

State election 1974: House District 54
Party	Candidate	Votes	%	±%
Democratic	Dorothy C. Goodwin	2,846	65.2	−4.8
Republican	Suzanne S. Taylor	1,517	34.8	+4.8
Majority		1,329	30.5	−9.5
Turnout		4,363		
Democratic hold		Swing	-4.8	

State election 1972: House District 54
Party	Candidate	Votes	%	±%
Democratic	Audrey P. Beck	4,278	70.0	
Republican	Jeffrey P. Ossen	1,834	30.0	
Majority		2,444	40.0	
Turnout		6,112		
Democratic hold		Swing		
