= Connecticut's 18th House of Representatives district =

American legislative district

Connecticut's 18th State House of Representatives district
Representative
Jillian Gilchrest; D

Connecticut's 18th House of Representatives district elects one member of the Connecticut House of Representatives. Its current representative is Jillian Gilchrest. The district consists of part of the town of West Hartford.

== List of representatives ==
List of Representatives from Connecticut's 18th State House District
Representative	Party	Years	District home	Note
Vincent A. Genovesi	Republican	1967–1969	Manchester	Seat created
Donald S. Genovesi	Republican	1969–1973	Manchester	
David H. Neiditz	Democratic	1973–1975	West Hartford	
Joan R. Kemler	Democratic	1975–1985	West Hartford	Appointed 77th Connecticut State Treasurer
Miles S. Rapoport	Democratic	1985–1995	West Hartford	Elected secretary of the State of Connecticut
Andy Fleischmann	Democratic	1995–2019	West Hartford	
Jillian Gilchrest	Democratic	2019–2025	West Hartford	

== Recent elections ==
Democratic Primary, August 11, 2026: House District 18
Party	Candidate	Votes	%	±%
Democratic	Tiffani McGinnis			

State Election 2022: House District 18
Party	Candidate	Votes	%	±%
Democratic	Jillian Gilchrest	6,265	100	
Democratic hold		Swing		

State Election 2020: House District 18
Party	Candidate	Votes	%	±%
Democratic	Jillian Gilchrest	8,412	73.1	
Republican	Rick Bush	3,097	26.9	
Turnout		11,509	100%	
Democratic hold		Swing		

State Election 2018: House District 18
Party	Candidate	Votes	%	±%
Democratic	Jillian Gilchrest	7,555	71.9	
Republican	Mary Fay	2,950	28.1	
Turnout		10,505	100%	
Democratic hold		Swing		

Democratic Primary, August 14, 2018: House District 18
Party	Candidate	Votes	%	±%
Democratic	Jillian Gilchrest	1,707	52.3	
Democratic	Andy Fleischmann	1,558	47.7	
Majority		149	4.6	
Turnout		3,265		

Republican Primary, August 14, 2018: House District 18
Party	Candidate	Votes	%	±%
Republican	Mary Fay			

State Election 2016: House District 18
Party	Candidate	Votes	%	±%
Democratic	Andy Fleischmann	7,474	64.8	
Republican	Robert Levine	4,052	35.2	
Turnout		11,526		
Democratic hold		Swing		

State Election 2014: House District 18
Party	Candidate	Votes	%	±%
Democratic	Andy Fleischmann		100	
Democratic hold		Swing		

State Election 2012: House District 18
Party	Candidate	Votes	%	±%
Democratic	Andy Fleischmann	8,260	100	
Turnout		8,260		
Democratic hold		Swing		

State Election 2010: House District 18
Party	Candidate	Votes	%	±%
Democratic	Andy Fleischmann	5,784	67.4	
Republican	Ethan Goldman	2,790	32.6	
Turnout		8,574		
Democratic hold		Swing		

State Election 2008: House District 18
Party	Candidate	Votes	%	±%
Democratic	Andy Fleischmann	8,088	73.3	
Republican	Thomas Knox	2,938	26.7	
Turnout		11,026		
Democratic hold		Swing		
