= Connecticut's 85th House of Representatives district =

American legislative district

Connecticut's 85th State House of Representatives district
Representative
| Mary Mushinsky; D |

Connecticut's 85th House of Representatives district elects one member of the Connecticut House of Representatives. It encompasses parts of Wallingford and has been represented by Democrat Mary Mushinsky since 1981.

== List of representatives ==
List of Representatives from Connecticut's 85th State House District
| Representative | Party | Years | District home | Note |
|---|---|---|---|---|
| Edward F. Bradley | Democratic | 1967–1969 | Waterbury | Seat created |
| Thomas J. McNellis | Democratic | 1969–1973 | Waterbury | |
| Thomas J. McKenna | Republican | 1973–1975 | Wallingford | |
| Thomas W. Grasser | Democratic | 1975–1977 | Wallingford | |
| Thomas J. McKenna | Republican | 1977–1979 | Wallingford | |
| Michael S. Kraskowski | Democratic | 1979–1981 | Wallingford | |
| Mary Mushinsky | Democratic | 1981–2027 | Wallingford | |
| Samuel Carmody | Democratic | 2027– | Wallingford | (elect) |

== Recent elections ==
=== 2020 ===
2020 Connecticut State House of Representatives election, District 85
| Party | Candidate | Votes | % |
|---|---|---|---|
| Democratic | Mary Mushinsky (incumbent) | 6,057 | 51.15 |
| Republican | Weston Ulbrich | 5,383 | 45.46 |
| Independent Party | Weston Ulbrich | 203 | 1.71 |
| Working Families | Mary Mushinsky (incumbent) | 198 | 1.67 |
| Total votes | | 11,841 | 100.00 |
| Democratic hold | | | |

=== 2018 ===
2018 Connecticut House of Representatives election, District 85
| Party | Candidate | Votes | % |
|---|---|---|---|
| Democratic | Mary Mushinsky (Incumbent) | 5,100 | 55.7 |
| Republican | Don Crouch | 4,051 | 44.3 |
| Total votes | | 9,151 | 100.00 |
| Democratic hold | | | |

=== 2016 ===
2016 Connecticut House of Representatives election, District 85
| Party | Candidate | Votes | % |
|---|---|---|---|
| Democratic | Mary Mushinsky (Incumbent) | 5,646 | 57.49 |
| Republican | Serge Mihaly | 4,174 | 42.51 |
| Total votes | | 9,820 | 100.00 |
| Democratic hold | | | |

=== 2014 ===
2014 Connecticut House of Representatives election, District 85
| Party | Candidate | Votes | % |
|---|---|---|---|
| Democratic | Mary Mushinsky (Incumbent) | 3,607 | 50.8 |
| Republican | Frank P. Apuzzo | 2,955 | 41.6 |
| Working Families | Mary Mushinsky (Incumbent) | 298 | 4.2 |
| Independent Party | Frank P. Apuzzo | 243 | 3.4 |
| Total votes | | 7,103 | 100.00 |
| Democratic hold | | | |

=== 2012 ===
2012 Connecticut House of Representatives election, District 85
| Party | Candidate | Votes | % |
|---|---|---|---|
| Democratic | Mary Mushinsky (Incumbent) | 6,082 | 62.2 |
| Republican | Gregory N. Bachand | 3,700 | 37.8 |
| Total votes | | 9,782 | 100.00 |
| Democratic hold | | | |
