= Denise Merrill =

American politician (born 1948)

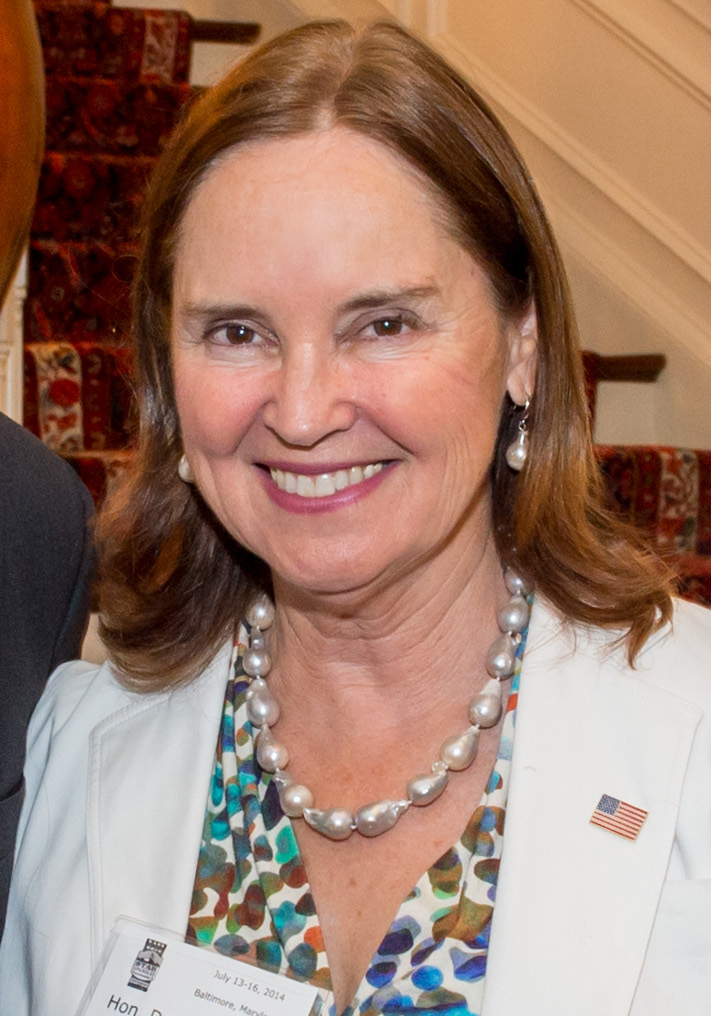

73rd Secretary of the State of Connecticut
- In office January 5, 2011 – June 30, 2022
- Governor: Dan Malloy; Ned Lamont
- Preceded by: Susan Bysiewicz
- Succeeded by: Mark Kohler

Majority Leader of the Connecticut House of Representatives
- In office January 7, 2009 – January 5, 2011
- Preceded by: Christopher Donovan
- Succeeded by: Brendan Sharkey

Member of the Connecticut House of Representatives from the 54th district
- In office November 10, 1993 – January 5, 2011
- Preceded by: Jonathan Pelto
- Succeeded by: Gregory Haddad

Personal details
- Born: October 8, 1948 (age 77) San Mateo, California, U.S.
- Party: Democratic
- Education: University of Connecticut (BA); Alliant International University, San Francisco
- Website: Government website

Denise W. Merrill (born October 8, 1948) is an American politician who most recently served as the Connecticut Secretary of the State from 2011 to 2022. A member of the Democratic Party, Merrill was previously a member of the Connecticut House of Representatives.

== Education ==
Merrill graduated from the University of Connecticut. She attended but did not graduate from the San Francisco Law School, now merged with Alliant International University, and was admitted to the State Bar of California.

== Career ==
=== Connecticut House of Representatives ===
Merrill was first elected to office in 1993 in a special election and served as the House Majority Leader after being elected to that position prior to the 2009 legislative session and until becoming Secretary of the State. Previously, Merrill had served as the House Chair on the Appropriations Committee from 2005 to 2008. In the State House she represented Fifty-Fourth Assembly District, which includes the towns of Mansfield and Chaplin.

=== Secretary of State ===
Following the state Democratic primary held on August 10, 2010, Merrill became her party's nominee for Secretary of the State for the November 2010 election. She went on to defeat Republican candidate Jerry Farrell Jr. on November 2. As a serving Secretary of State, she is a part of the National Association of Secretaries of State and was also elected its president for the 2016–2017 term.

On June 23, 2021, she announced her intent not to seek re-election in 2022.

On June 28, 2022, Merrill announced her resignation effective June 30, in order to spend more time caring for her ailing husband.

=== Other work ===
She currently serves on the Board of Advisors of Let America Vote, an organization founded by former Missouri Secretary of State Jason Kander that aims to end voter suppression.

== Personal life ==
Merrill is also a classically trained pianist. She has three grown children and five grandchildren.

== Electoral history ==
Connecticut House of Representatives 54th District Election, 1994
Party	Candidate	Votes	%
Democratic*	Denise Merrill	3,843	77.01
Republican	David Dyer	1,147	22.99

*Merrill was also nominated on A Connecticut Party line.

Connecticut House of Representatives 54th District Election, 1996
Party	Candidate	Votes	%
Democratic	Denise Merrill (inc.)	4,748	100.00

Connecticut House of Representatives 54th District Election, 1998
Party	Candidate	Votes	%
Democratic	Denise Merrill (inc.)	3,384	100.00

Connecticut House of Representatives 54th District Election, 2000
Party	Candidate	Votes	%
Democratic	Denise Merrill (inc.)	4,506	100.00

Connecticut House of Representatives 54th District Election, 2002
Party	Candidate	Votes	%
Democratic	Denise Merrill (inc.)	3,959	76.95
Republican	John Thatcher, III	1,186	23.05

Connecticut House of Representatives 54th District Election, 2004
Party	Candidate	Votes	%
Democratic	Denise Merrill (inc.)	6,312	94.51
Working Families	Magdalena Russell	367	5.49

Connecticut House of Representatives 54th District Election, 2006
Party	Candidate	Votes	%
Democratic*	Denise Merrill (inc.)	5,916	100.00
Write-in	James Sargent	2	0.00

*Merrill was also listed on the Working Families Party line.

Connecticut House of Representatives 54th District Election, 2008
Party	Candidate	Votes	%
Democratic	Denise Merrill (inc.)	8,781	100.00

Connecticut Secretary of State Democratic Primary Election, 2010
Party	Candidate	Votes	%
Democratic	Denise Merrill	107,003	62.95
Democratic	Gerry Garcia	62,978	37.05

Connecticut Secretary of State Election, 2010
Party	Candidate	Votes	%
Democratic*	Denise Merrill	584,313	52.87
Republican	Jerry Farrell, Jr.	484,163	43.81
Independent	Michael Telesca	14,530	1.31
Green	Michael DeRosa	13,566	1.23
Libertarian	Ken Mosher	8,631	0.78

*Merrill was also listed on the Working Families Party line.

Connecticut Secretary of State Election, 2014
Party	Candidate	Votes	%
Democratic*	Denise Merrill (inc.)	533,543	50.95
Republican*	Peter Lumaj	489,515	46.75
Green	Michael DeRosa	24,038	2.30

*Merrill was also listed on the Working Families Party line; Lumaj was also listed on the Independent Party line.

Connecticut Secretary of State Election, 2018
Party	Candidate	Votes	%
Democratic*	Denise Merrill (inc.)	764,067	55.87
Republican*	Susan Chapman	580,779	42.47
Green	Michael DeRosa	12,469	0.91
Libertarian	Heather Lynn Sylvestre Gwynn	10,361	0.76

*Merrill was also listed on the Working Families Party line; Chapman was also listed on the Independent Party line.

Party political offices
Preceded by Susan Bysiewicz	Democratic nominee for Secretary of the State of Connecticut; 2010, 2014, 2018	Succeeded by Stephanie Thomas
Connecticut House of Representatives
Preceded by Jonathan Pelto	Member of the Connecticut House of Representatives from the 54th district 1993–2011	Succeeded by Gregory Haddad
Preceded by Christopher Donovan	Majority Leader of the Connecticut House of Representatives; 2009–2011	Succeeded by Brendan Sharkey
Political offices
Preceded by Susan Bysiewicz	Secretary of State of Connecticut; 2011–2022	Succeeded by Mark Kohler
