= Connecticut Green Party =

Connecticut affiliate of the Green Party

Green Party of Connecticut
- Chair people: Keith Foster; Ronna Stuller
- Headquarters: PO BOX 44, North Haven, Connecticut 06473
- Membership (2026): ▲1,435
- Ideology: Green politics
- Political position: Left-wing
- National affiliation: Green Party of the United States
- Colors: Green
- Seats in the U.S. Senate: 0 / 2
- Seats in the U.S. House: 0 / 5
- Connecticut Senate: 0 / 36
- Connecticut House of Representatives: 0 / 151
- Other elected officials: 10 (July 2025)

Website
- ctgreenparty.org

The Green Party of Connecticut (GPCT) is the Connecticut affiliate of the Green Party of the United States. It is governed by three co-chairs, who must not be of the same gender, all of whom are elected at their Annual Meeting each May. The party is committed to grassroots democracy, social justice, non-violence and ecological wisdom. Those are also the four pillars of Green politics.

== History ==
Ralph Nader, one of the more well-known Green Party figures in the United States, is from Connecticut, though he has never been a party member. For the 2006 election year, the Connecticut Green Party endorsed Cliff Thornton to run for governor, and Ralph Ferrucci to run for U.S. Senate. The Connecticut Greens also endorsed Daniel Sumrall and Richard Duffee to run for Congress in the 3rd and 4th districts respectively.

In the 2007 elections, two party members were elected. In New Haven, Allan Brison was elected alderman in the 10th Ward (386 votes to 283). In Windham, party Co-chair Jean deSmet was elected First Selectman. DeSmet is the first Green Party candidate in the state to win a top municipal office.

In 2017, the CTGP saw numerous victories at the polls, and established their first minority caucus in a municipal legislature in the state party's history with the election of four Greens to the Waterford Representative Town Meeting.

== Elected officials ==
As of November 2017, the following members hold elected office (with term expiration date):

- Colleen Ann Reidy, Thompsonville Fire Commission, Enfield (May 2018)
- Daphne Dixon, Zoning Board of Appeals Alternate, Fairfield (Nov. 2019)
- Rob Barstow, Zoning Board of Appeals Alternate, Marlborough (Nov. 2021)
- Mirna Martinez, Board of Education, New London (Nov. 2019)
- Joseph DeGregorio, Board of Finance, New Milford (Nov. 2019)
- Leif Smith, Constable, Redding (Nov. 2019)
- Billy Gene Collins, Zoning Board of Appeals Alternate, Waterford (Nov. 2019)
- Carl D'Amato, Representative Town Meeting, District 4, Waterford (Nov. 2019)
- Andrew Frascarelli, Representative Town Meeting, District 1, Waterford (Nov. 2019)
- Joshua Steele Kelly, Representative Town Meeting, District 3, Waterford (Nov. 2019)
- Baird Welch-Collins, Representative Town Meeting, District 2, Waterford (Nov. 2019)
- Darcy Van Ness, Zoning Board of Appeals Alternate, Waterford (Nov. 2021)
- Cassandra Martineau, Zoning Board of Appeals Alternate, Willimantic (Nov. 2021)
- Dagmar Noll, town council, Willimantic (Nov. 2021)
- Douglas Lary, Board of Finance, Windham (Nov. 2021)
- Michael Westerfield, Board of Assessment Appeals, Windham (Nov. 2019)
