= 1930 Connecticut Attorney General election =

- November 4, 1930
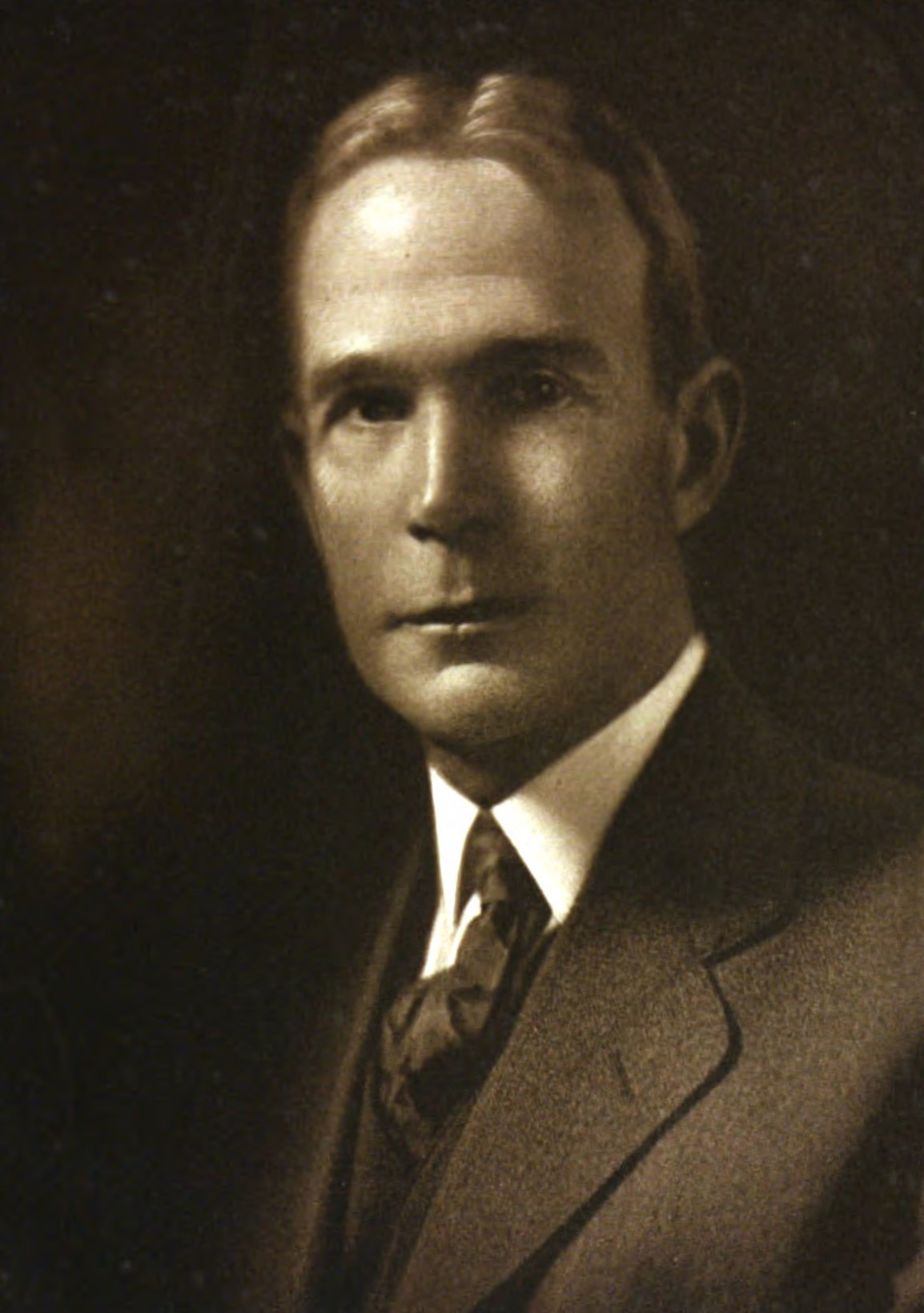

Nominee	Warren Booth Burrows	David A. Wilson
Party	Republican	Democratic
Popular vote	216,172	208,174
Percentage	50.9%	49.1%
- Burrows: 50–60% 60–70% 70–80% 80–90% Wilson: 50–60% 60–70% No Data/Vote
Attorney General before election
Benjamin W. Alling
Republican
Elected Attorney General
Warren Booth Burrows
Republican

The 1930 Connecticut Attorney General election was held on November 4, 1930, in order to elect the Attorney General of Connecticut. Republican nominee and former Judge of the United States District Court for the District of Connecticut Warren Booth Burrows defeated Democratic nominee and future state party chairman David A. Wilson.

== General election ==
On election day, November 4, 1930, Republican nominee Warren Booth Burrows won the election by a margin of 7,998 votes against his opponent Democratic nominee David A. Wilson, thereby retaining Republican control over the office of Attorney General. Burrows was sworn in as the 8th Attorney General of Connecticut on January 7, 1931.

=== Results ===
Connecticut Attorney General election, 1930
Party	Candidate	Votes	%
Republican	Warren Booth Burrows	216,172	50.94%
Democratic	David A. Wilson	208,174	49.06%
Total votes		424,346	100.00%
Republican hold			
