= 1926 Connecticut Attorney General election =

- November 2, 1926

Nominee	Benjamin W. Alling	Frederick M. McCarthy
Party	Republican	Democratic
Popular vote	192,516	106,167
Percentage	64.5%	35.5%
- Alling: 50–60% 60–70% 70–80% 80–90% 90–100% McCarthy: 50–60%
Attorney General before election
Frank E. Healy
Republican
Elected Attorney General
Benjamin W. Alling
Republican

The 1926 Connecticut Attorney General election was held on November 2, 1926, in order to elect the Attorney General of Connecticut. Republican nominee and incumbent member of the Connecticut House of Representatives Benjamin W. Alling defeated Democratic nominee and former member of the Connecticut State Senate Frederick M. McCarthy.

== General election ==
On election day, November 2, 1926, Republican nominee Benjamin W. Alling won the election by a margin of 86,349 votes against his opponent Democratic nominee Frederick M. McCarthy, thereby retaining Republican control over the office of Attorney General. Alling was sworn in as the 7th Attorney General of Connecticut in 1927.

=== Results ===
Connecticut Attorney General election, 1926
Party	Candidate	Votes	%
Republican	Benjamin W. Alling	192,516	64.45%
Democratic	Frederick M. McCarthy	106,167	35.55%
Total votes		298,683	100.00%
Republican hold			
