= 1938 Connecticut Attorney General election =

- November 8, 1938
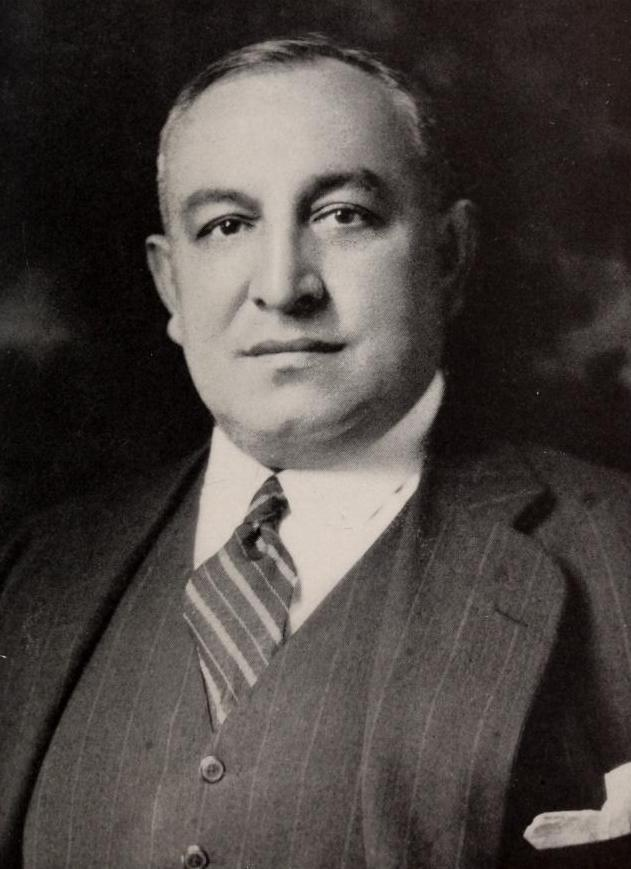

Nominee	Francis A. Pallotti	Charles J. McLaughlin	Harry Schwartz
Party	Republican	Democratic	Socialist
Popular vote	270,023	248,477	102,857
Percentage	43.5%	40.0%	16.5%
- Pallotti: 40–50% 50–60% 60–70% 70–80% 80–90% McLaughlin: 30-40% 40–50% 50–60% 60–70% Schwartz: 40-50%
Attorney General before election
Charles J. McLaughlin (Acting)
Democratic
Elected Attorney General
Francis A. Pallotti
Republican

The 1938 Connecticut Attorney General election was held on November 8, 1938, in order to elect the Attorney General of Connecticut. Republican nominee and former Secretary of the State of Connecticut Francis A. Pallotti defeated Democratic nominee and incumbent acting Attorney General Charles J. McLaughlin and Socialist nominee Harry Schwartz.

== General election ==
On election day, November 8, 1938, Republican nominee Francis A. Pallotti won the election by a margin of 21,546 votes against his foremost opponent Democratic nominee Charles J. McLaughlin, thereby gaining Republican control over the office of Attorney General. Pallotti was sworn in as the 12th Attorney General of Connecticut on January 4, 1939.

=== Results ===
Connecticut Attorney General election, 1938
Party	Candidate	Votes	%
Republican	Francis A. Pallotti	270,023	43.46%
Democratic	Charles J. McLaughlin (incumbent)	248,477	39.99%
Socialist	Harry Schwartz	102,857	16.55%
Total votes		621,357	100.00%
Republican gain from Democratic			
