= 1902 Connecticut Attorney General election =

- November 4, 1902

Nominee	William A. King	Noble E. Pierce
Party	Republican	Democratic
Popular vote	84,225	70,025
Percentage	54.6%	45.4%
- King: 50–60% 60–70% 70–80% 80–90% Pierce: 50–60% 60–70%
Attorney General before election
Charles Phelps
Republican
Elected Attorney General
William A. King
Republican

The 1902 Connecticut Attorney General election was held on November 4, 1902, in order to elect the Attorney General of Connecticut. Republican nominee and incumbent member of the Connecticut House of Representatives William A. King defeated Democratic nominee Noble E. Pierce.

== General election ==
On election day, November 4, 1902, Republican nominee William A. King won the election by a margin of 14,200 votes against his opponent Democratic nominee Noble E. Pierce, thereby retaining Republican control over the office of Attorney General. King was sworn in as the 2nd Attorney General of Connecticut in 1903.

=== Results ===
Connecticut Attorney General election, 1902
Party	Candidate	Votes	%
Republican	William A. King	84,225	54.60%
Democratic	Noble E. Pierce	70,025	45.40%
Total votes		154,250	100.00%
Republican hold			
