= 1942 Connecticut Attorney General election =

- November 3, 1942
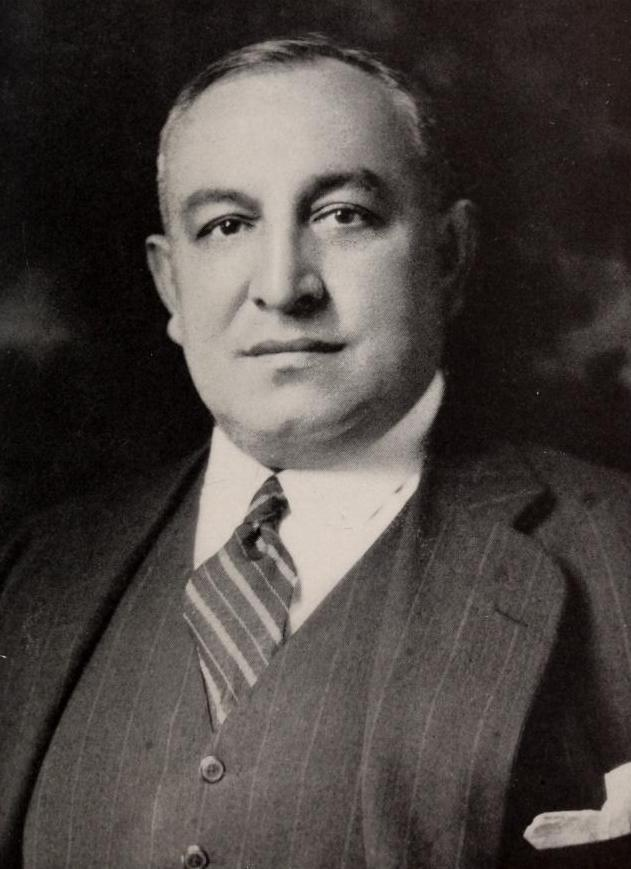

Nominee	Francis A. Pallotti	Reinhart L. Gideon
Party	Republican	Democratic
Popular vote	281,794	258,914
Percentage	49.6%	45.5%
- Pallotti: 40–50% 50–60% 60–70% 70–80% 80–90% Gideon: 40–50% 50–60% 60–70%
Attorney General before election
Francis A. Pallotti
Republican
Elected Attorney General
Francis A. Pallotti
Republican

The 1942 Connecticut Attorney General election was held on November 3, 1942, in order to elect the Attorney General of Connecticut. Republican nominee and incumbent Attorney General Francis A. Pallotti defeated Democratic nominee Reinhart L. Gideon and Socialist nominee Harry Schwartz.

== General election ==
On election day, November 3, 1942, Republican nominee Francis A. Pallotti won re-election by a margin of 12,880 votes against his foremost opponent Democratic nominee Reinhart L. Gideon, thereby retaining Republican control over the office of Attorney General. Pallotti was sworn in for his second term on January 4, 1943.

=== Results ===
Connecticut Attorney General election, 1942
Party	Candidate	Votes	%
Republican	Francis A. Pallotti (incumbent)	281,794	49.56%
Democratic	Reinhart L. Gideon	258,914	45.53%
Socialist	Harry Schwartz	27,943	4.91%
Total votes		568,651	100.00%
Republican hold			
