= 1934 Connecticut Attorney General election =

- November 6, 1934

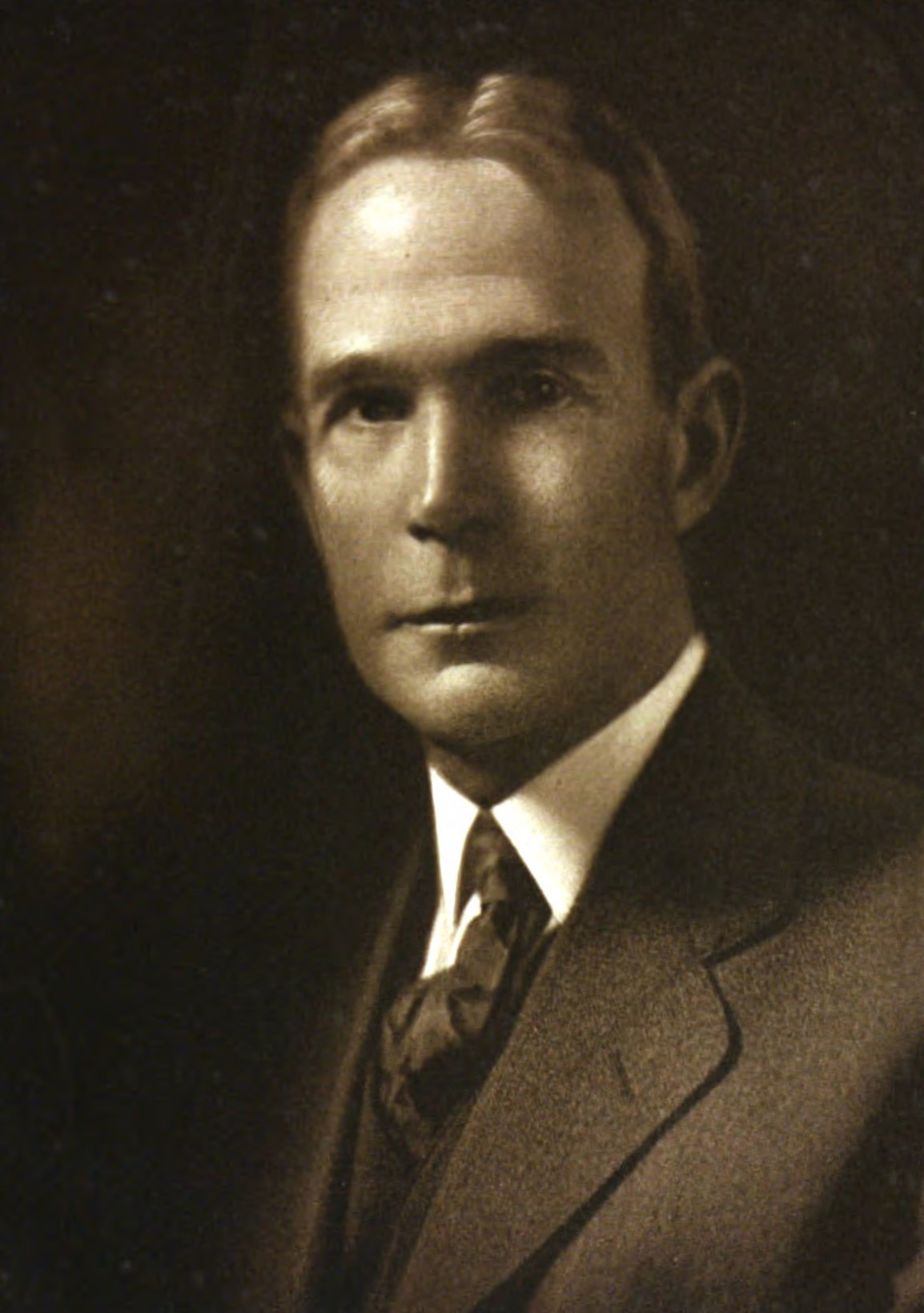
Nominee	Edward J. Daly	Warren Booth Burrows
Party	Democratic	Republican
Popular vote	263,033	250,495
Percentage	51.2%	48.8%
- Daly: 50–60% 60–70% Burrows: 50–60% 60–70% 70–80% 80–90% Tie: 50%
Attorney General before election
Warren Booth Burrows
Republican
Elected Attorney General
Edward J. Daly
Democratic

The 1934 Connecticut Attorney General election was held on November 6, 1934, in order to elect the Attorney General of Connecticut. Democratic nominee Edward J. Daly defeated Republican nominee and incumbent Attorney General Warren Booth Burrows.

== General election ==
On election day, November 6, 1934, Democratic nominee Edward J. Daly won the election by a margin of 12,538 votes against his opponent Republican nominee Warren Booth Burrows, thereby gaining Democratic control over the office of Attorney General. Daly was sworn in as the 9th Attorney General of Connecticut on January 7, 1935.

=== Results ===
Connecticut Attorney General election, 1934
Party	Candidate	Votes	%
Democratic	Edward J. Daly	263,033	51.22%
Republican	Warren Booth Burrows (incumbent)	250,495	48.78%
Total votes		513,527	100.00%
Democratic gain from Republican			
