= 1922 Connecticut Attorney General election =

- November 7, 1922

Nominee	Frank E. Healy	Benjamin Slade
Party	Republican	Democratic
Popular vote	170,980	146,764
Percentage	53.8%	46.2%
- Healy: 50–60% 60–70% 70–80% 80–90% Slade: 50–60% 60–70%
Attorney General before election
Frank E. Healy
Republican
Elected Attorney General
Frank E. Healy
Republican

The 1922 Connecticut Attorney General election was held on November 7, 1922, in order to elect the Attorney General of Connecticut. Republican nominee and incumbent Attorney General Frank E. Healy defeated Democratic nominee Benjamin Slade.

== General election ==
On election day, November 7, 1922, Republican nominee Frank E. Healy won re-election by a margin of 24,216 votes against his opponent Democratic nominee Benjamin Slade, thereby retaining Republican control over the office of Attorney General. Healy was sworn in for his second term in 1923.

=== Results ===
Connecticut Attorney General election, 1922
Party	Candidate	Votes	%
Republican	Frank E. Healy (incumbent)	170,980	53.81%
Democratic	Benjamin Slade	146,764	46.19%
Total votes		317,744	100.00%
Republican hold			
