= 2018 Connecticut Attorney General election =

- November 6, 2018
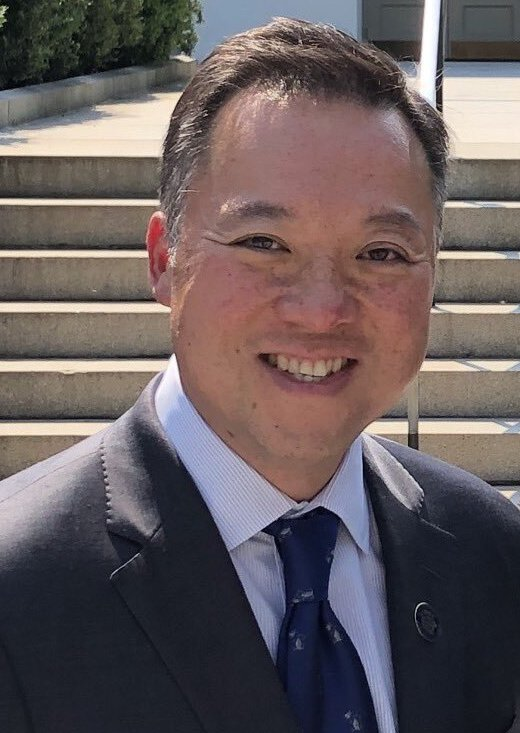

| Nominee | William Tong | Susan Hatfield |
| Party | Democratic | Republican |
| Alliance | Working Families | Independent Party |
| Popular vote | 715,340 | 633,360 |
| Percentage | 52.48% | 46.47% |
- Tong: 40–50% 50–60% 60–70% 70–80% 80–90% >90% Hatfield: 40–50% 50–60% 60–70% 70–80%
Attorney General before election
George Jepsen
Democratic
Elected Attorney General
William Tong
Democratic

The 2018 Connecticut Attorney General election took place on November 6, 2018, to elect the attorney general of Connecticut.

Incumbent Connecticut Attorney General George Jepsen did not seek re-election. Democratic nominee and state representative William Tong defeated Republican nominee Susan Hatfield.

== Democratic primary ==
On August 14, 2018, State representative William Tong won the Democratic primary, defeating US attorney Chris Mattei and state senator Paul Doyle.

=== Results ===
Democratic primary results
| Party | Candidate | Votes | % |
|---|---|---|---|
| Democratic | William Tong | 119,574 | 57.43 |
| Democratic | Chris Mattei | 53,822 | 25.85 |
| Democratic | Paul Doyle | 34,822 | 16.72 |
| Total votes | | 208,218 | 100.0 |

== Republican primary ==
On August 14, 2018, assistant state's attorney Susan Hatfield won the Republican primary, defeating former state representative John Shaban.

=== Results ===
Republican primary results
| Party | Candidate | Votes | % |
|---|---|---|---|
| Republican | Susan Hatfield | 106,076 | 79.33 |
| Republican | John Shaban | 27,639 | 20.67 |
| Total votes | | 133,715 | 100.0 |

== General election ==
William Tong won the general election on November 6, 2018, with a 6.01% margin of victory.

=== Predictions ===
| Source | Ranking | As of |
|---|---|---|
| Governing | Lean D | October 26, 2018 |

=== Endorsements ===
William Tong (D)

Organizations

- Hearst Connecticut Group

Newspapers

- Hartford Courant
- Stamford Advocate
Susan Hatfield (R)

Organizations

- ~~Connecticut Citizens Defense League~~

=== Results ===
2018 Connecticut Attorney General election
| Party | Candidate | Votes | % |
|---|---|---|---|
| Democratic | William Tong | 691,496 | 50.73% |
| Working Families | William Tong | 23,844 | 1.75% |
| Total | William Tong | 715,340 | 52.48% |
| Republican | Susan Hatfield | 605,504 | 44.42% |
| Independent Party | Susan Hatfield | 27,856 | 2.04% |
| Total | Susan Hatfield | 633,360 | 46.47% |
| Green | Peter Goselin | 14,358 | 1.05% |
| Total votes | | 1,363,058 | 100.0 |
| Democratic hold | | | |

==== By congressional district ====
Tong won three of the five congressional districts, while Hatfield won the other two, both of which elected Democrats.

| District | Tong | Hatfield | Representative |
|---|---|---|---|
| 1st | 56% | 43% | John B. Larson |
| 2nd | 47% | 52% | Joe Courtney |
| 3rd | 55% | 44% | Rosa DeLauro |
| 4th | 57% | 42% | Jim Himes |
| 5th | 48% | 51% | Elizabeth Esty (115th Congress) |
| 5th | 48% | 51% | Jahana Hayes (116th Congress) |
