= List of mayors of Vernon, Connecticut =

Term Year	Mayor Name	Party	Reference
1965–1967	Thomas J. McCusker	Democratic	
1967–1969	John E. Grant	Republican	
1969–1975	Frank J. McCoy	Republican	
1975–1977	Thomas A. Benoit	Democratic	
1977–1979	Frank J. McCoy	Republican	
1979–1987	Marie Herbst	Democratic	
1987–1989	Stephen C. Marcham	Democratic	
1989–1993	John F. Drost	Democratic	
1993–1995	Edward C. Slattery	Republican	
1995–1997	Tony Muro	Democratic	
1997–1999	Joe Grabinski	Republican	
1999–2001	Stephen C. Marcham	Democratic	
2001–2003	Diane Wheelock	Republican	
2003–2007	Ellen L. Marmer	Democratic	
2007–2011	Jason L. McCoy	Republican	
2011–2013	George F. Apel	Republican	
2013–present	Daniel A. Champagne	Republican	
