= 2014 Connecticut Attorney General election =

- November 4, 2014
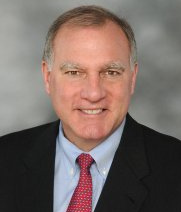

Nominee	George Jepsen	Kie Westby
Party	Democratic	Republican
Alliance	Working Families	Independent
Popular vote	590,225	427,869
Percentage	56.7%	41.1%
- Jepsen: 40–50% 50–60% 60–70% 70–80% 80–90% 90-100% Westby: 40–50% 50–60% 60–70%
Attorney General before election
George Jepsen
Democratic
Elected Attorney General
George Jepsen
Democratic

The 2014 Connecticut Attorney General election took place on November 4, 2014, to elect the Attorney General of Connecticut. Incumbent Democratic Attorney General George Jepsen won re-election to a second term, defeating Republican nominee Kie Westby.

== Democratic primary ==
=== Candidates ===
==== Nominee ====
- George Jepsen, incumbent attorney general

== Republican primary ==
=== Candidates ===
==== Nominee ====
- Kie Westby, attorney, candidate for Attorney General of Connecticut in 2010 and U.S. Senate in 2012

== Third-party candidates and independent candidates ==
=== Green Party ===
Nominee

- Stephen Fournier, attorney, former Green Party co-chair, nominee for U.S. House of Representatives in 2008 and Attorney General of Connecticut in 2010

=== Independent Party of Connecticut ===
The Independent Party of Connecticut endorsed Westby, giving him access to an additional ballot line.

Official designee

- Kie Westby, attorney, candidate for Attorney General of Connecticut in 2010 and U.S. Senate in 2012

=== Working Families Party ===
The Working Families Party endorsed Jepsen, giving him access to an additional ballot line.

Official designee

- George Jepsen, incumbent attorney general

== General election ==
=== Results ===
2014 Connecticut Attorney General election
Party	Candidate	Votes	%	±%
Democratic	George Jepsen	556,994	53.53%	+1.90%
Working Families	George Jepsen	33,231	3.19%	+1.11%
Total	George Jepsen (incumbent)	590,225	56.73%	+3.02%
Republican	Kie Westby	406,936	39.11%	−4.48%
Independent Party	Kie Westby	20,933	2.01%	+0.65%
Total	Kie Westby	427,869	41.12%	−2.47%
Green	Stephen Fournier	22,361	2.15%	+0.81%
Total votes		1,040,455	100.0%	
Democratic hold				

==== By congressional district ====
Jepsen won all five congressional districts.

District	Jepsen	Westby	Representative
1st	63%	35%	John B. Larson
2nd	55%	42%	Joe Courtney
3rd	62%	36%	Rosa DeLauro
4th	52%	47%	Jim Himes
5th	52%	46%	Elizabeth Esty

== See also ==
- Connecticut Attorney General
