= Democratic Party of Connecticut =

Connecticut affiliate of the Democratic Party

- Chairperson: Roberto Alves
- Governor: Ned Lamont
- Lieutenant Governor: Susan Bysiewicz
- Senate President pro tempore: Martin Looney
- House Speaker: Matthew Ritter
- Headquarters: Hartford, Connecticut
- Membership (2025): 878,453
- Colors: Blue
- State House: 102 / 151
- State Senate: 25 / 36
- Statewide executive offices: 6 / 6
- U.S. House of Representatives: 5 / 5
- U.S. Senate: 2 / 2

Election symbol

Website
- www.ctdems.org

The Connecticut Democratic State Central Committee (CT Dems) is the affiliate of the Democratic Party in the state of Connecticut. Its chair is Roberto L. Alves.

It is the dominant party in the state. Connecticut Democrats control both chambers of the state legislature, all constitutional state offices, all five of Connecticut's seats in the United States House of Representatives, and both of its seats in the United States Senate.

== Current elected officials ==
=== Members of Congress ===
==== U.S. Senate ====
Democrats have controlled both of Connecticut's seats in the U.S. Senate since 1988: (Note: Joe Lieberman won the 1988 election as a Democrat. Lieberman left the party and became an Independent in 2006 but continued to caucus with Senate Democrats until his retirement in 2012.)

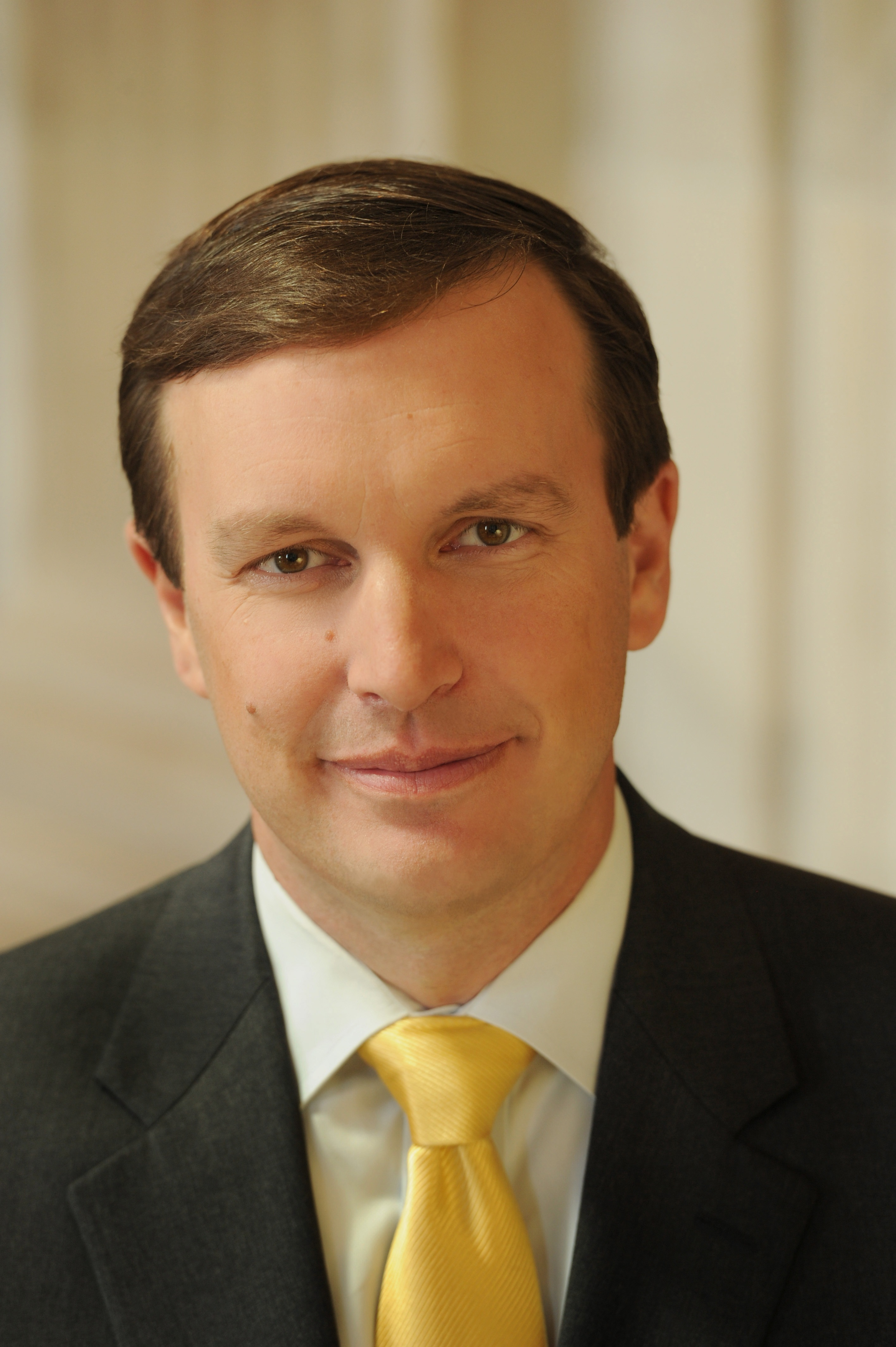
Junior U.S. Senator Chris Murphy

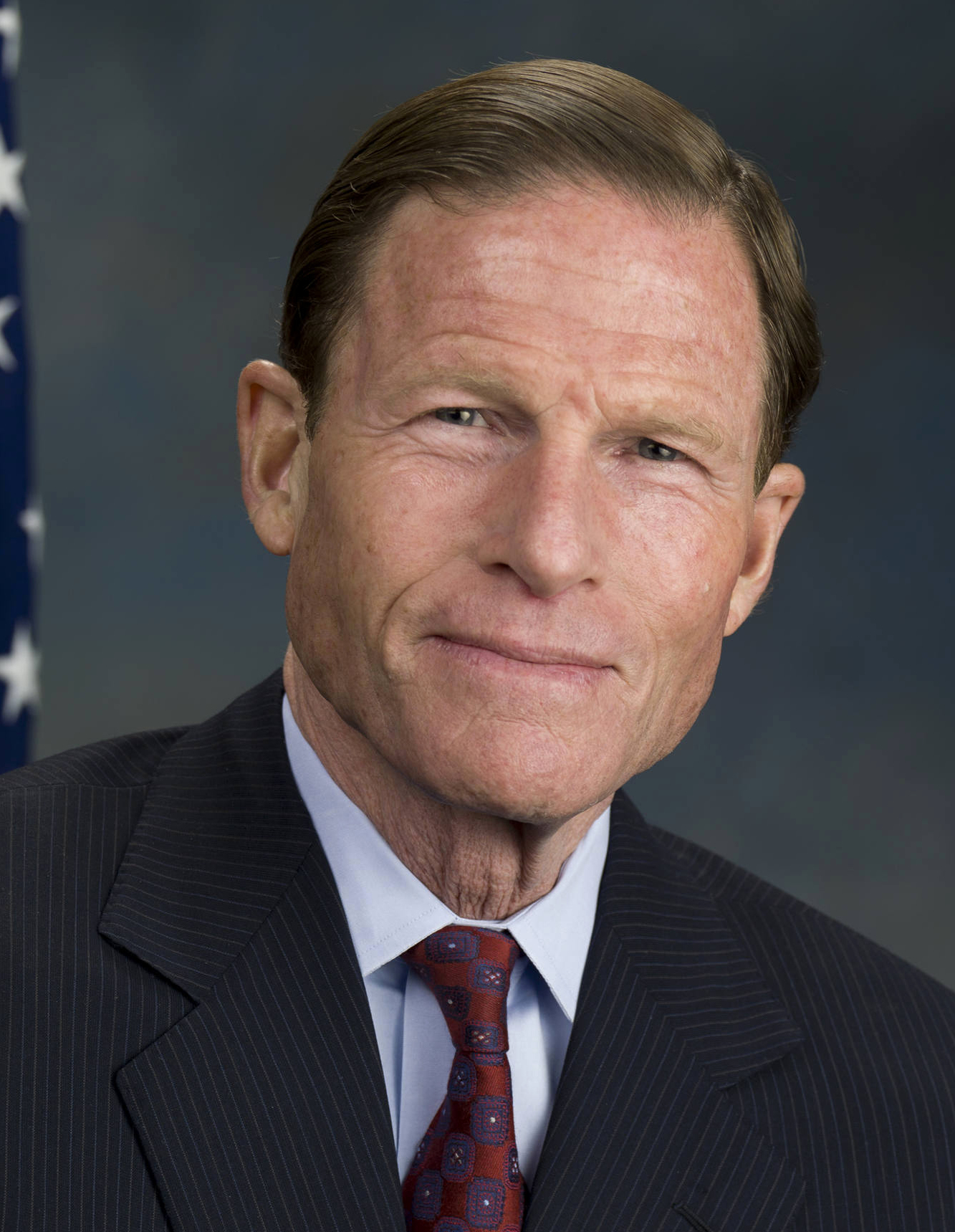
Senior U.S. Senator Richard Blumenthal

==== U.S. House of Representatives ====
Democrats have controlled all five seats Connecticut is apportioned in the U.S. House of Representatives since 2008:

District	Member	Photo
1st	John B. Larson	
1st	Luke Bronin (elect)	framless
2nd	Joe Courtney	
3rd	Rosa DeLauro	
4th	Jim Himes	
5th	Jahana Hayes	

==== Statewide offices ====
Democrats have controlled all six of the elected statewide offices since 2010:

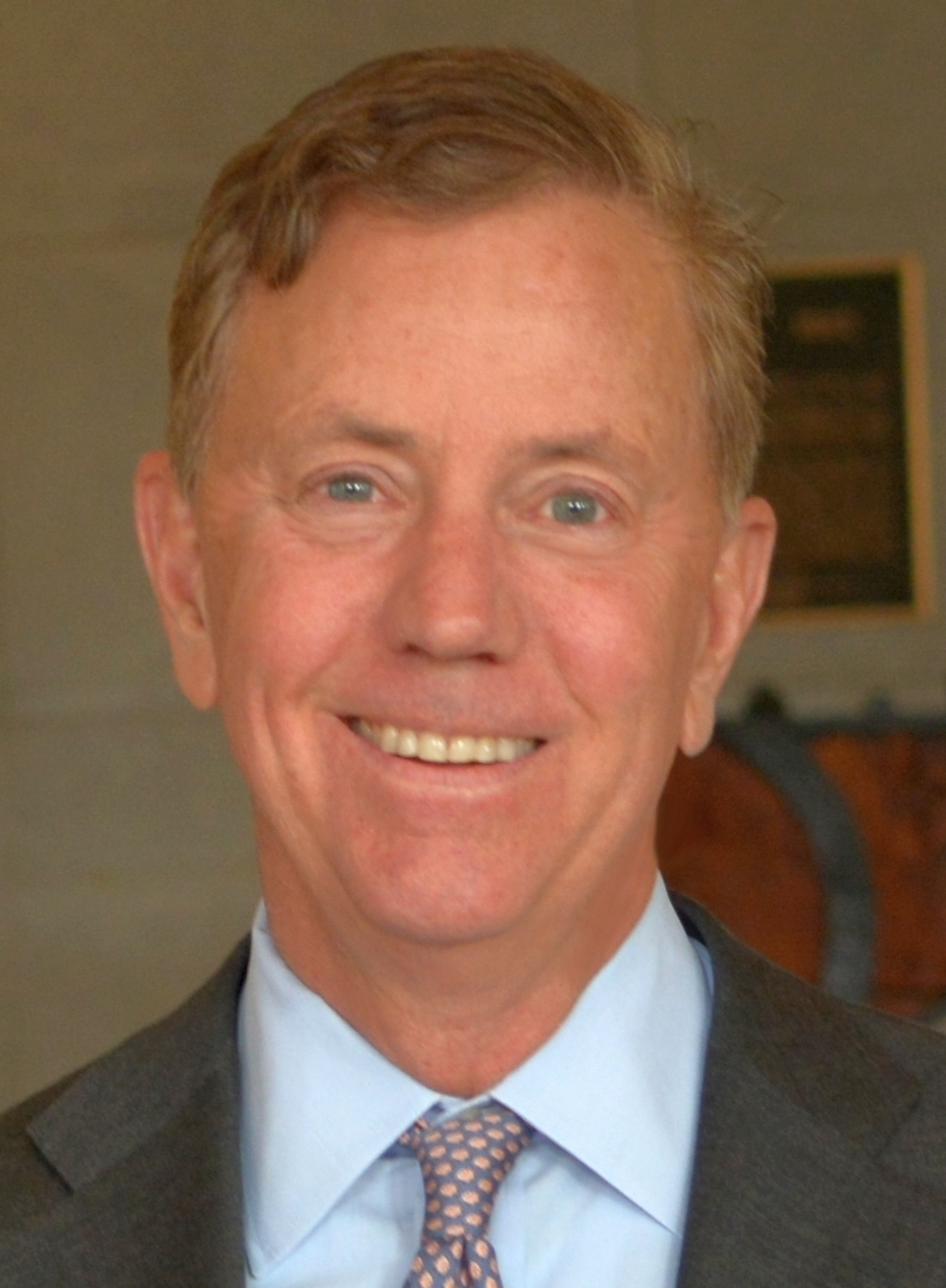
Governor Ned Lamont

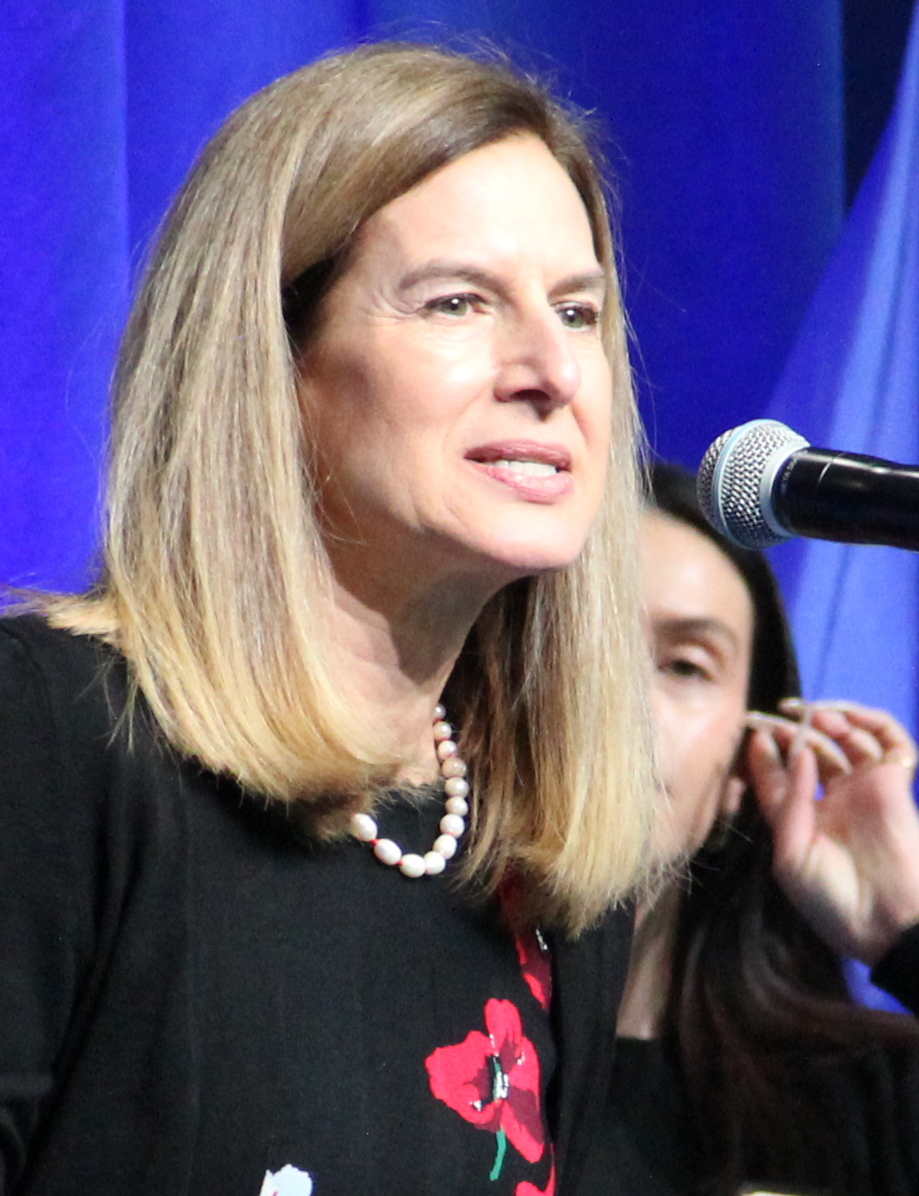
Lieutenant Governor Susan Bysiewicz

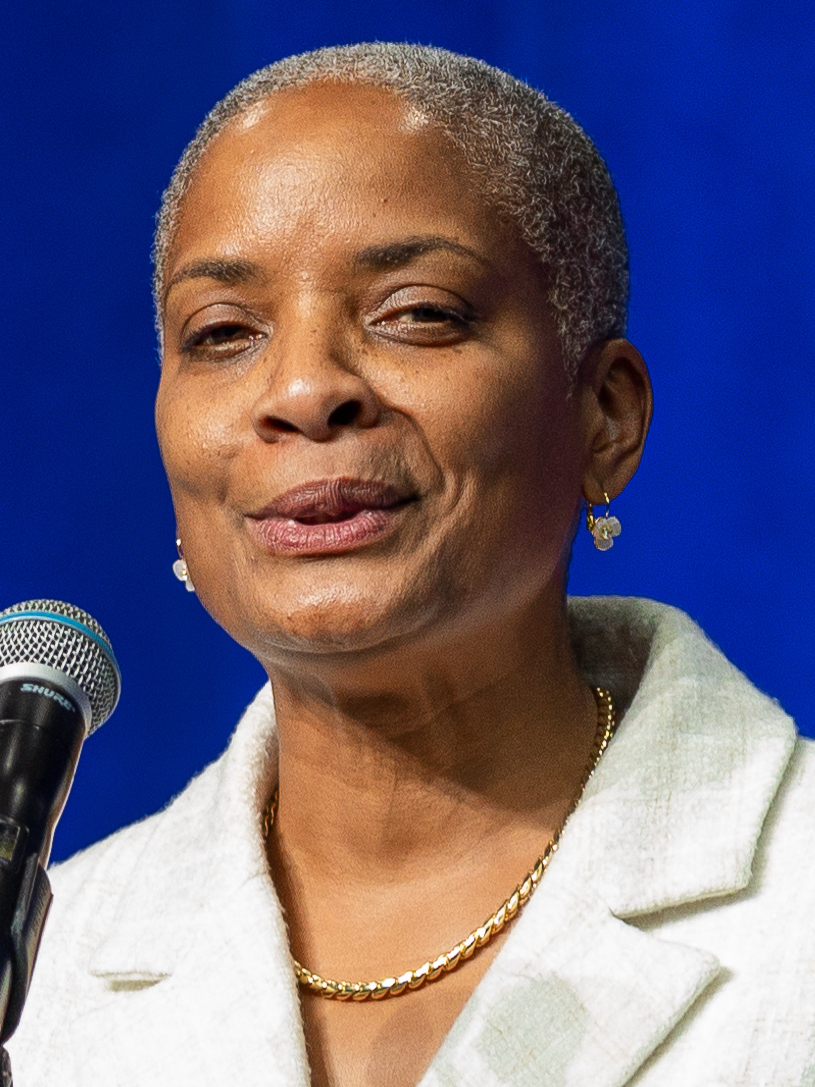
Secretary of the State Stephanie Thomas

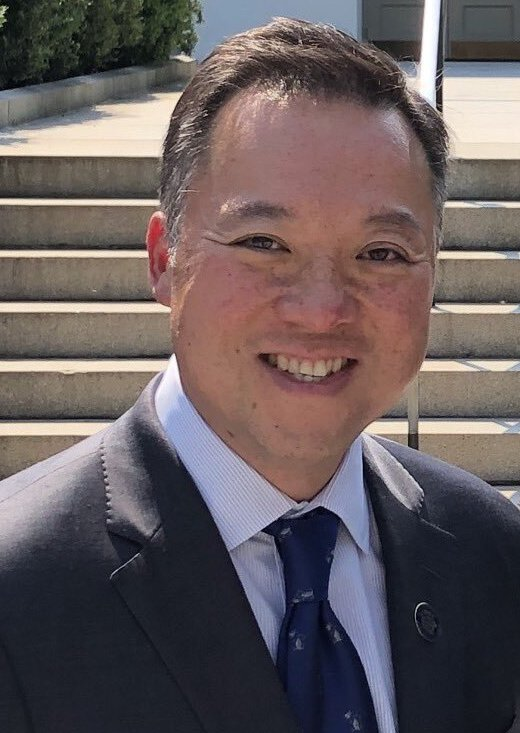
Attorney General William Tong
- State Treasurer: Erick Russell
- State Comptroller: Sean Scanlon

==== State legislature leaders ====
- Senate President Pro Tempore: Martin Looney
  - Senate Majority Leader: Bob Duff
- Speaker of the House: Matthew Ritter
  - House Majority Leader: Jason Rojas

=== Municipal ===
The following Democrats hold prominent mayoralties in Connecticut:

- Bridgeport: Joe Ganim (1)
- Stamford: Caroline Simmons (2)
- New Haven: Justin Elicker (3)
- Hartford: Arunan Arulampalam (4)
- Waterbury: Paul Pernerewski (5)
- Norwalk: Harry Rilling (6)

== List of chairs of the Connecticut Democratic Party ==
Chairman	Town	Tenure
Roberto Alves	Danbury	2025–present
Nancy DiNardo	Trumbull	2020–2025
Nancy Wyman	Tolland	2019–2020
Nick Balletto	Guilford	2015–2019
Nancy DiNardo	Trumbull	2005–2015
George Jepsen	Greenwich	2003–2005
John W. Olsen	Greenwich	2001–2002
Edward L. Marcus	Branford	1992–2001
John Droney	West Hartford	1986–1992
Timothy Moynihan	East Hartford	1985–1986
James M. Fitzgerald	East Hartford	1980–1985
John N. Dempsey Jr.	Hartford	1978–1980
William A. O'Neill	East Hampton	1975–1978
John M. Bailey	Hartford	1946–1975
John A. McGuire	Wallingford	1946
Adrian W. Maher	Stratford	1944–1945
John M. Dowe	Danielson	1942–1944
John T. McCarthy	Newtown	1940–1942
J. Francis Smith	Waterbury	1934–1940
David A. Wilson	Hartford	1932–1934
Patrick B. O'Sullivan	Orange	1930–1931
James J. Walsh	Meriden	1925–1930
Edward M. Yoemans	Andover	1922–1925
David E. Fitzgerald	New Haven	1914–1922
George Forster	Rockville	1912–1914
Charles W. Comstock	Norwich	1906–1912
John J. Walsh	Norwalk	1902–1906
Charles F. Thayer	Norwich	1900–1902
Melbert B. Cary	Ridgefield	1898–1900
Alexander Troup	New Haven	1897–1898
Clinton B. Davis	Higganum	1895–1897

== Election results ==
=== Federal ===
==== U.S. House ====
Election	Votes	%	Seats (CT)	±	%
2016	990,139	62.86	5 / 5	0	6.33
2018	849,341	61.64	5 / 5	0	0.84
2020	1,060,231	59.83	5 / 5	0	1.81
2022	721,526	57.20	5 / 5	0	2.63
2024	1,000,415	58.85	5 / 5	0	1.65
2026	807,959	62.84	5 / 5	0	3.99

=== State ===
==== Executive offices ====
Governor
Election	Candidate	Votes	%	Result
1950	Chester Bowles	419,404	47.73%	Lost ✗
1954	Abraham Ribicoff	463,643	49.50%	Won ✓
1958	Abraham Ribicoff	607,012	62.29%	Won ✓
1962	John N. Dempsey	549,027	52.31%	Won ✓
1966	John N. Dempsey/Attilio R. Frassinelli	561,599	55.68%	Won ✓
1970	Emilio Daddario/Hugh C. Curran	500,561	46.23%	Lost ✗
1974	Ella Grasso/Robert K. Killian	643,490	58.35%	Won ✓
1978	Ella Grasso/William A. O'Neill	613,109	59.15%	Won ✓
1982	William A. O'Neill/Joseph J. Fauliso	578,264	53.35%	Won ✓
1986	William A. O'Neill/Joseph J. Fauliso	575,638	54.93%	Won ✓
1990	Bruce Morrison/Sandra Bender	236,641	20.74%	Lost ✗
1994	Bill Curry/Joe Ganim	375,133	32.70%	Lost ✗
1998	Barbara B. Kennelly/Joe Courtney	354,187	35.44%	Lost ✗
2002	Bill Curry/George Jepsen	448,984	43.89%	Lost ✗
2006	John DeStefano Jr./Mary Glassman	398,220	69.56%	Lost ✗
2010	Dannel Malloy/Nancy Wyman	567,278	49.51%	Won ✓
2014	Dannel Malloy/Nancy Wyman	554,314	50.73%	Won ✓
2018	Ned Lamont/Susan Bysiewicz	694,510	49.37%	Won ✓
2022	Ned Lamont/Susan Bysiewicz	710,186	55.97%	Won ✓
2026	Ned Lamont/Susan Bysiewicz	771,936	59.57%	Won ✓

Attorney General
Election	Candidate	Votes	%	Result
2014	George Jepsen	590,225	56.7%	Won ✓
2018	William Tong	715,340	52.48%	Won ✓
2022	William Tong	713,894	50.07%	Won ✓
2026	William Tong	807,844	63.24%	Won ✓

Secretary of State
Election	Candidate	Votes	%	Result
2014	Denise Merrill	533,543	51.0%	Won ✓
2018	Denise Merrill	764,067	55.9%	Won ✓
2022	Stephanie Thomas	687,714	55.22%	Won ✓
2026	Stephanie Thomas	809,177	63.46%	Won ✓

== See also ==
- Political party strength in Connecticut
