= 1898 Connecticut Attorney General election =

- November 8, 1898
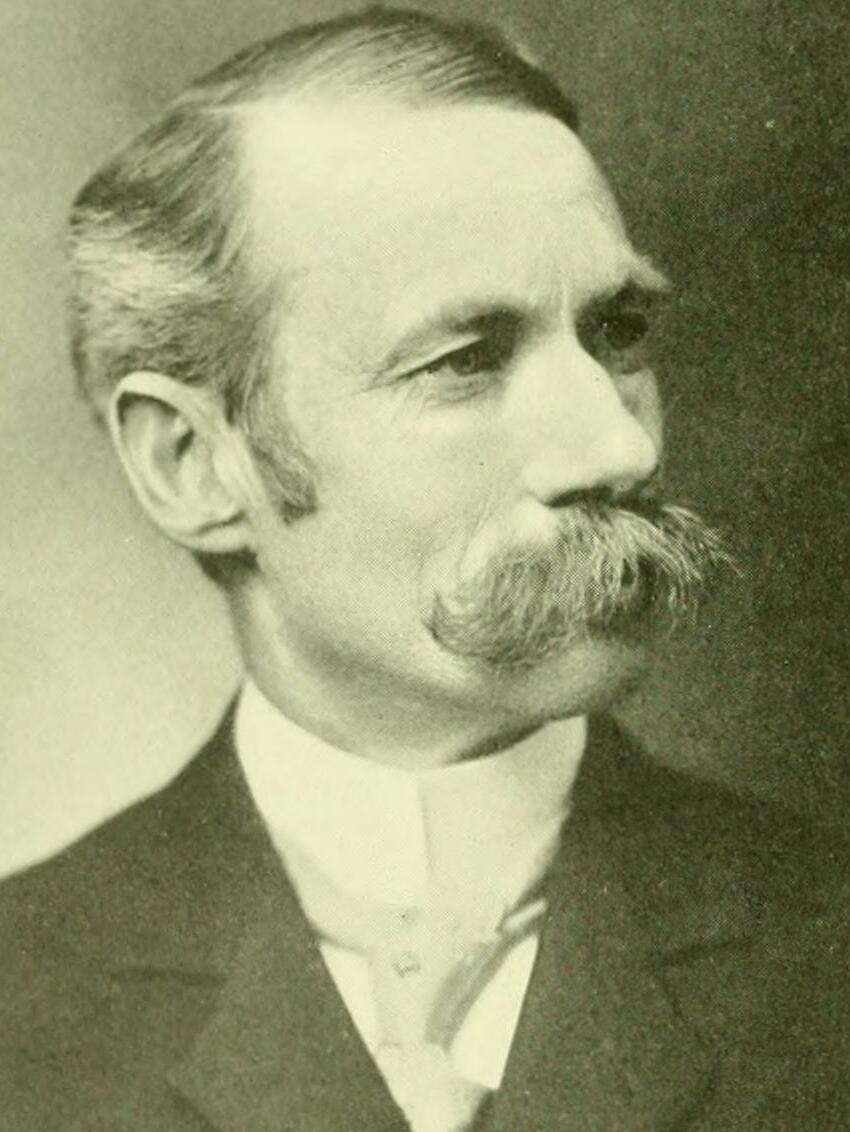

| Nominee | Charles Phelps | Levi N. Blydenburgh |
| Party | Republican | Democratic |
| Popular vote | 81,797 | 63,464 |
| Percentage | 56.3% | 43.7% |
- Phelps: 50–60% 60–70% 70–80% 80–90% Blydenburgh: 50–60% 60–70% 70–80%
Attorney General before election
Office established
Elected Attorney General
Charles Phelps
Republican

The 1898 Connecticut Attorney General election was held on November 8, 1898, in order to elect the first Attorney General of Connecticut upon the creation of the office by the Connecticut General Assembly in 1897. Republican nominee and incumbent Secretary of the State of Connecticut Charles Phelps defeated Democratic nominee and former member of the Connecticut State Senate Levi N. Blydenburgh.

== General election ==
On election day, November 8, 1898, Republican nominee Charles Phelps won the election by a margin of 18,333 votes against his opponent Democratic nominee Levi N. Blydenburgh, thereby gaining Republican control over the office of Attorney General. Phelps was sworn in as the 1st Attorney General of Connecticut in 1899.

=== Results ===
Connecticut Attorney General election, 1898
| Party | Candidate | Votes | % |
|---|---|---|---|
| Republican | Charles Phelps | 81,797 | 56.31% |
| Democratic | Levi N. Blydenburgh | 63,464 | 43.69% |
| Total votes | | 145,261 | 100.00% |
| Republican gain from | | | |
