= 2026 Connecticut Attorney General election =

- November 3, 2026
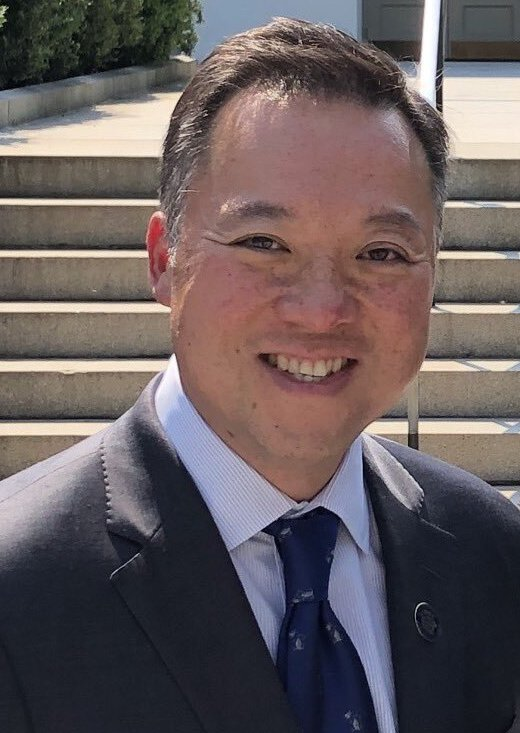

Candidate	William Tong	John Bolton
Party	Democratic	Republican
Alliance	Working Families
Popular vote	807,844	469,545
Percentage	63.24%	36.76%
- Tong: 50–60% 60–70% 70–80% 80–90% 90–100% Bolton: 50–60% 60–70%
Attorney General before election
William Tong
Democratic
Elected Attorney General
William Tong
Democratic

The 2026 Connecticut Attorney General election was held on November 3, 2026, to elect the Connecticut Attorney General. Democratic Incumbent William Tong won re-election to a third term.

== Democratic primary ==
=== Candidates ===
==== Nominee ====
- William Tong, incumbent attorney general

== Republican primary ==
=== Candidates ===
==== Nominee ====
- John Bolton (Note: No relation to former National Security Advisor John Bolton), attorney, member of the Westport planning and zoning commission, and nominee for state representative in 2024

== General election ==
=== Polling ===
Poll source	Date(s) administered	Sample size (Note: Key: A – all adults RV – registered voters LV – likely voters V – unclear)	Margin of error	William Tong (D)	John Bolton (R)	Other	Undecided
University of New Hampshire	September 17–21, 2026	540 (LV)	± 4.2%	57%	30%	—	13%

=== Results ===
2026 Connecticut Attorney General election
Party	Candidate	Votes	%	±%
Democratic	William Tong	767,127	60.05	N/A
Working Families	William Tong	40,717	3.19	N/A
Total	William Tong (incumbent)	807,844	63.24	+6.17
Republican	John Bolton	469,545	36.76	−4.66
Total votes		1,277,389	100.00	
