= Roberto Alves =

Roberto Alves may refer to:

- Roberto Alves (footballer) (born 1997), Swiss footballer
- Roberto Alves (politician) (born 1983), American politician
