= Marie Herbst =

American politician (1928–2015)

Member of the Connecticut Senate from the 35th district
- In office 1987–1993
- Preceded by: James D. Giulietti
- Succeeded by: Tony Guglielmo

Mayor of Vernon, Connecticut
- In office 1979–1987
- Preceded by: Frank J. McCoy
- Succeeded by: Stephen C. Marcham

Personal details
- Born: Marie Antoinette DeCarlo; May 26, 1928
- Died: April 15, 2015 (aged 86)
- Party: Democratic
- Spouse: Paul Edward Herbst
- Children: 5
- Education: Albany State Teachers College (B.A.); Columbia Teachers College (M.A.); University of Connecticut

Marie Antoinette Herbst (May 26, 1928 – April 15, 2015) was an American politician from Connecticut. From 1979 to 1987, she served as mayor of Vernon, Connecticut, the first woman to hold the position. From 1987 to 1993, she served in the Connecticut State Senate, representing the 35th district as a Democrat.

== Personal life and education ==
Herbst was born Marie Antoinette DeCarlo on May 26, 1928. She attended Albany State Teachers College, where she earned a bachelor's degree; Columbia Teachers College, where she earned a master's degree; and the University of Connecticut, where she earned a degree in education. She worked as a teacher in East Windsor, Connecticut's public school system. She married her husband, Paul Edward Herbst, on August 9, 1952. Together, they had five children.

Herbst died on April 15, 2015. She was 86.

== Political career ==
Herbst was elected mayor of Vernon, Connecticut, in 1978. She was the first woman to hold the position, and she served until 1987, when she was elected to the Connecticut State Senate.

Herbst served three terms in the Senate, representing the 35th district as a Democrat. She ran for reelection in 1992, but was defeated by Republican candidate Tony Guglielmo.

Herbst remained active in local politics following her service in the Senate. She served nine terms on the Vernon Town Council before retiring in 2013.

Political offices
Preceded by Frank J. McCoy	Mayor of Vernon, Connecticut; 1979–1987	Succeeded by Stephen C. Marcham
Connecticut State Senate
Preceded by James D. Giulietti	Member of the Connecticut State Senate from the 35th district 1987–1993	Succeeded by Tony Guglielmo
