= 2022 Connecticut Attorney General election =

- November 8, 2022
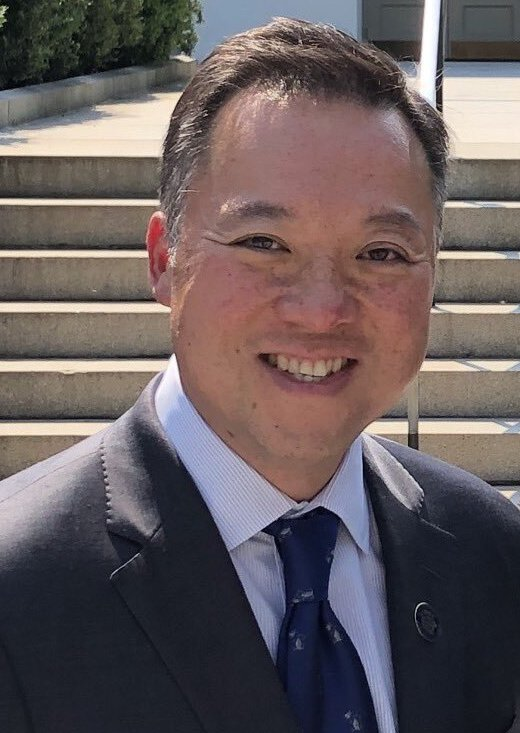

Nominee	William Tong	Jessica Kordas
Party	Democratic	Republican
Popular vote	713,894	518,128
Percentage	57.07%	41.42%
- Tong: 40–50% 50–60% 60–70% 70–80% 80-90% Kordas: 40–50% 50–60% 60–70%
Attorney General before election
William Tong
Democratic
Elected Attorney General
William Tong
Democratic

The 2022 Connecticut Attorney General election took place on November 8, 2022, to elect the Attorney General of Connecticut. Incumbent Connecticut Attorney General William Tong won re-election to a second term. Tong outperformed all other statewide Democrats and was the only statewide candidate in Connecticut to win by a margin greater than 15 percent in 2022.

== Democratic primary ==
=== Candidates ===
==== Nominee ====
- William Tong, incumbent attorney general

=== Endorsements ===
William Tong

Labor unions

- Connecticut AFL–CIO

== Republican primary ==
=== Candidates ===
==== Nominee ====
- Jessica Kordas, attorney

== General election ==
=== Predictions ===
Source	Ranking	As of
Sabato's Crystal Ball	Safe D	September 14, 2022
Elections Daily	Safe D	November 1, 2022

=== Results ===
2022 Connecticut Attorney General election
Party	Candidate	Votes	%	±%
Democratic	William Tong (incumbent)	713,894	57.07%	+4.59%
Republican	Jessica Kordas	518,128	41.42%	−5.05%
Independent Party	A.P. Pascarella	11,788	0.94%	N/A
Green	Ken Krayeske	7,103	0.57%	−0.48%
Total votes		1,250,913	100.0%	
Democratic hold				

==== By county ====
County	William Tong Democratic		Jessica Kordas Republican		Other parties Independent		Total votes cast
County	#	%	#	%	#	%	Total votes cast
Fairfield	178,918	57.31%	128,775	41.25%	4,509	1.45%	312,202
Hartford	188,330	61.6%	113,076	36.98%	4,346	1.43%	305,752
Litchfield	38,004	47.14%	41,524	51.5%	1,096	1.36%	80,624
Middlesex	42,110	56.9%	30,778	41.59%	1,119	1.51%	74,007
New Haven	160,221	56.94%	116,756	41.5%	4,391	1.56%	281,368
New London	55,323	56.04%	41,535	42.07%	1,863	1.89%	98,721
Tolland	32,247	54.33%	26,180	44.11%	923	1.55%	59,350
Windham	18,741	48.19%	19,504	50.15%	644	1.66%	38,889
Totals	713,894	57.07%	518,128	41.42%	18,891	1.51%	1,250,913

Counties that flipped from Republican to Democratic

- Middlesex (largest town: Middletown)
- Tolland (largest town: Vernon)
- New London (largest town: Norwich)

==== By congressional district ====
Tong won all five congressional districts.

District	Tong	Kordas	Representative
1st	63%	36%	John B. Larson
2nd	55%	44%	Joe Courtney
3rd	58%	40%	Rosa DeLauro
4th	59%	40%	Jim Himes
5th	52%	47%	Jahana Hayes

== See also ==
- Connecticut Attorney General
