= Tony Guglielmo =

American politician (born 1940)

Member of the Connecticut State Senate from the 35th district
- In office January 6, 1993 – January 9, 2019
- Preceded by: Marie Herbst
- Succeeded by: Dan Champagne
- Constituency: represents Ashford, Chaplin, Coventry, Eastford, Ellington (part), Hampton, Pomfret, Stafford, Tolland, Union, Vernon, Willington, and Woodstock

Personal details
- Born: October 3, 1940 (age 85)
- Party: Republican
- Spouse: Doris Guglielmo

Tony Guglielmo (born October 13, 1940) is a Republican former member of the Connecticut Senate, representing the 35th District from 1993 to 2019. He announced his retirement on February 16, 2018. The 35th district represents northeastern Connecticut, including the towns of Ashford, Chaplin, Coventry, Eastford, Ellington (part), Hampton, Pomfret, Stafford, Tolland, Union, Vernon, Willington, and Woodstock. He previously served on the Small Business Administration Advisory Council and the Council on Aging.

Guglielmo holds a B.A. in political science from the University of Connecticut and a M.A. in history from Trinity College in Hartford. He is president and co-owner of the Penny-Hanley & Howley Co. Inc. independent insurance agency in Stafford, and he has served as a past board member of the Connecticut Association for the Prevention of Child Abuse, Connecticut Student Loan Association, Tolland Bank, and the Johnson Memorial Hospital.

Guglielmo also served in the US Army and National Guard from 1963 to 1968.

== See also ==
- Connecticut Senate
