= Jason L. McCoy =

American lawyer and former mayor

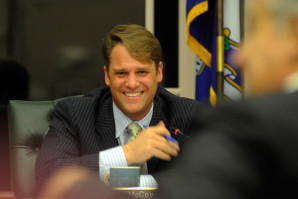

Mayor of Vernon, Connecticut
- In office November 7, 2007 – November 22, 2011
- Preceded by: Ellen L. Marmer
- Succeeded by: George F. Apel

Personal details
- Born: Vernon, Connecticut, U.S.
- Party: Republican
- Education: University of Connecticut (BA); Western New England University School of Law (JD)
- Profession: Attorney

Jason L. McCoy is the former mayor of Vernon, Connecticut, and a trial lawyer. In 2007, McCoy was elected to his first term. McCoy was next re-elected as mayor. He had served on the Vernon Town Council and was the deputy mayor of Vernon from 2005 to 2007. In 2009, McCoy was one of six mayors in Connecticut chosen by the Governor M. Jodi Rell to work closely with state officials and lawmakers to identify savings and recommend mandate relief to help close Connecticut's state budget shortfall. McCoy served as mayor of a municipality that holds town meetings to pass the mayor's yearly proposed municipal budget, which can then be sent to referendum for approval by privately cast ballot. During McCoy's two terms (four years) as mayor of Vernon he proposed and passed four municipal budgets. The Town of Vernon municipal budgets during McCoy's terms as mayor resulted in the municipal tax rate or mil rate needed to fund the municipal budget being reduced in the 2008–09, 2009–10 budgets, the 2010–11 tax rate or mil rate remained the same. In the 2011–12 budget the tax rate was cut which resulted in a taxes cut to the taxpayers in the Town of Vernon, Connecticut. The 2011–12 budget proposal was passed and adopted at the annual town meeting as opposed to being sent to referendum.

Mayor McCoy declined being placed in nomination at the Republican convention for the 2010 Connecticut attorney general election.

In the 2010 gubernatorial election, several Bridgeport polling places ran out of ballots. Based upon McCoy's observation of the election day election administration in Bridgeport, he was a vocal critic of Bridgeport's handling of unofficial ballots in the election between former United States Ambassador to Ireland Republican candidate Thomas C. Foley and former Stamford Mayor Dan Malloy.

In December 2010, McCoy advanced a policy proposal that was adopted by the Town Council and the Board of Education to consolidate management services for town and school board buildings and grounds under the municipal public works department to lower the overall cost of services, reduce duplication, and increase buying power for the benefit of Vernon taxpayers.

At the end of January 2011, after consulting with a structural engineer, McCoy declared a state of emergency in Vernon after winter storm Ella, which caused excess snow to accumulate on the 700,000 square feet (65,000 m^{2}) of municipal rooftops, placing the buildings in eminent danger of collapse. As a result of the declaration, McCoy made a formal request to Homeland Security for assistance from the National Guard, and was given authorization by the Governor to call the Connecticut National Guard into Vernon to assist municipal workers with snow removal from the municipal building roofs. The request by McCoy was the first of its type in Connecticut, triggering other municipalities to test their roofs resulting in shut downs of other municipal buildings in other municipalities due to roof failures for the protection of their citizens.

McCoy announced his candidacy to seek the office of U.S. Senate in the United States Senate election in Connecticut, 2012, an open seat being vacated by Connecticut U.S. Senator Joe Lieberman. The announcement was made on WFSB Face the State.

McCoy at the end of his second term as mayor of Vernon handled a natural disaster after an October 28, 2011, Nor'easter hit Connecticut leaving Vernon and many municipalities in Connecticut in the state of emergency where citizens were trapped in their homes by downed Connecticut Light and Power electrical lines entangled in trees and vegetation blocking state and municipal roads leaving citizens trapped without electrical service for 14 days. Connecticut Light and Power did not send crews to Vernon remove over 215 power lines blocking the state and local roadways in Vernon.

On February 8, 2012, the State of Connecticut Freedom of Information Commission found that the mayor and Town of Vernon respondents failed to prove that respondents performed "programming or formatting functions" within the meaning of §1-212(b)(1), G.S. because the respondents engaged in "search and retrieval" within the meaning of §1-212(b)(1) therefore respondents could not charge a fee of $950.00 for "programming or formatting functions" because it was only a search and retrieval function performed for a member of the public for copies of public records. Therefore, the statutorily-permitted fee for "search and retrieval," of the requested records is $0.00. The requestor had sought copies of all written or electronically transmitted correspondence sent to or from mayor staffer a recent college graduate according to a Hartford Courant article. The respondent had claimed to engage in programming-related functions in order to do the programming necessary to generate computer-stored documents responsive to the complainants' request as an "outside contractor" in fulfilling the FOI request, and could charge the requestor a fee for searching and retrieving records at his hourly attorney rate or the hourly rate as a mayor. The Connecticut General Statutes Sec. 1-212(b)(1), charging any fee for "searching or retrieving" is not permitted unless an "outside contractor" provides the agency with computer storage and retrieval services. It was concluded that under the FOI Act, the respondent was not permitted to charge the private hourly rate or the hourly pay for the mayor's position for the search and retrieval that was done. Rather, the respondent was permitted to charge only the maximum permissible fee of fifty cents per page as set forth in §1-212(a).

During his tenure as mayor, Attorney Jason L. McCoy continued the practice of law as a lawyer trying jury trials to verdict McCoy is a member of American Association for Justice and the Connecticut Trial Lawyers Association Board of Governors. He has published written material and presented the material to lawyers in Connecticut and nationally. McCoy has published written material entitled "Bringing a Gun Shot Case—Pitfalls and Insurance" at the American Association for Justice annual convention in Boston Massachusetts. Attorney Jason L. McCoy was the Moderator on Monday, February 20, 2006 at Association of Trial Lawyers of America (ATLA) Winter Convention, in Honolulu, Track II "Keeping Our Roads Safe: Litigating Motor Vehicle and Interstate Trucking Cases". Attorney Jason L. McCoy was the co-chairman of "Making a Federal Case of It: Feeling Confident in Federal Court, Connecticut Civil Justice Foundation, May 18, 2007" where he published written material and presented "Deposition, Documents & Discovery at Trial", on November 29, 2007 for the National Business Institute Continuing Legal Education for Professionals seminar related to Personal Injury Cases in Hartford Connecticut he presented at the "Calculating and Proving Damages" seminar on his written material "Working With Economic On Damages", he co-chaired "Responding to Legal Emergencies" for the Connecticut Civil Justice Foundation on October 13, 2006, where he published written material and presented "Notice Requirements: Don't Get Caught Short!", he presented "Focus Groups You CAN Afford" where he presented written material and clips of footage from some of the focus groups on April 25, 2005 to the Connecticut Civil Justice Foundation at the Spring Dinner, and on October 23, 2009 at the Annual Legal Support Staff seminar he published written material and presented on the use of "Vendors and Tools That Streamline and Help Litigation".
