= Nancy DiNardo =

American politician

Chair of the Connecticut Democratic Party
- In office June 11, 2020 – January 22, 2025
- Preceded by: Nancy Wyman
- Succeeded by: Roberto Alves
- In office January 19, 2005 – February 1, 2015
- Preceded by: George Jepsen
- Succeeded by: Nick Balletto

Personal details
- Born: 1949 or 1950 (age 76–77)
- Party: Democratic
- Education: Emmanuel College, Massachusetts (BA); Fairfield University (MA)

Nancy DiNardo (born 1949 or 1950) is an American politician, teacher, and businesswoman from Connecticut. She was the current Chairwoman of the Democratic Party of Connecticut and was first woman to hold that position. She served in that position from 2005 until 2015 and from 2020 to 2025. In the intervening five years, she served as Vice-Chairwoman.

== Career ==
DiNardo served as the chairperson of the party's Trumbull Town Committee for nearly 20 years. DiNardo was employed as an educator in the Bridgeport school system for 30 years.

DiNardo has worked for Trumbull's board of health, finance, and police commission. She was treasurer of Bridgeport Mayor Joseph Ganim's 1994 gubernatorial campaign.

On November 27, 2024, DiNardo announced she would step down as state party chair. Governor Ned Lamont soon endorsed the Mayor of Danbury, Roberto Alves, to fill her role.

Party political offices
| Preceded by George Jepsen | Chair of the Connecticut Democratic Party; 19 January 2005 – 1 February 2015 | Succeeded by Nick Balletto |
| Preceded by Nancy Wyman | Chair of the Connecticut Democratic Party; 11 June 2020 – 22 January 2025 | Succeeded by Roberto Alves |
