= Roberto Alves (politician) =

Portuguese-born American politician

Mayor of Danbury
- Incumbent
- Assumed office November 30, 2023
- Preceded by: Dean Esposito

Chair of the Connecticut Democratic Party
- Incumbent
- Assumed office January 22, 2025
- Preceded by: Nancy DiNardo

Personal details
- Born: Roberto Alves Lopes; August 30, 1983 (age 43) Fafe, Portugal
- Citizenship: United States (since 2017); Portugal; Brazil
- Party: Democratic
- Spouse: Robyn Caroline Wicks (m. 2012)
- Children: 2
- Education: Danbury High School
- Website: Government website

Roberto Lopes Alves (born August 30, 1983) is a Portuguese-born American businessman and politician serving as the current mayor of the city of Danbury, Connecticut, since November 2023. Alves has also served as chair of the Democratic Party of Connecticut since January 2025.

== Early life and education ==
Alves was born August 30, 1983 in Fafe in the Braga district of Portugal, the oldest of three children, to Antonio Augusto Alves (1959–2023) and Isaura Alves (née Lopes), into a Catholic family. He has two younger sisters.

His paternal family was originally from Fafe while his mother was born in Brazil to Portuguese parents from Braga and Viana do Castelo. His family moved to Danbury, Connecticut in 1989 by way of Rio de Janeiro, Brazil, when he was five years old. He was initially undocumented after overstaying a tourist visa.

He graduated from Danbury Public Schools.

== Career ==
After obtaining citizenship in 2017, Alves ran for town council, but lost. He ran again in 2019, and was elected as one of six to an at-large multi-member district for one two-year term. In 2021 he ran for mayor against Republican Dean Esposito, but lost. He ran against Esposito again in 2023, and was elected as the first Latino mayor of the city of Danbury. He was also the first Democrat to be elected mayor since Gene Eriquez in 1999. On November 27, 2024, Nancy DiNardo announced her retirement as Connecticut State Democratic Party Chair. That same day, Connecticut Governor Ned Lamont endorsed Alves to become the next chair. He was later elected to this position unanimously.

== Personal life ==
He is married to his wife Robyn Caroline Wicks. They have two children. On September 23, 2025, it was announced that Alves had been diagnosed with Lymphoma cancer. Alves became a naturalized U.S. citizen in 2017.

Party political offices
Preceded by Nancy DiNardo	Chair of the Connecticut Democratic Party; 2025–present	Incumbent
