= William Tong =

American politician

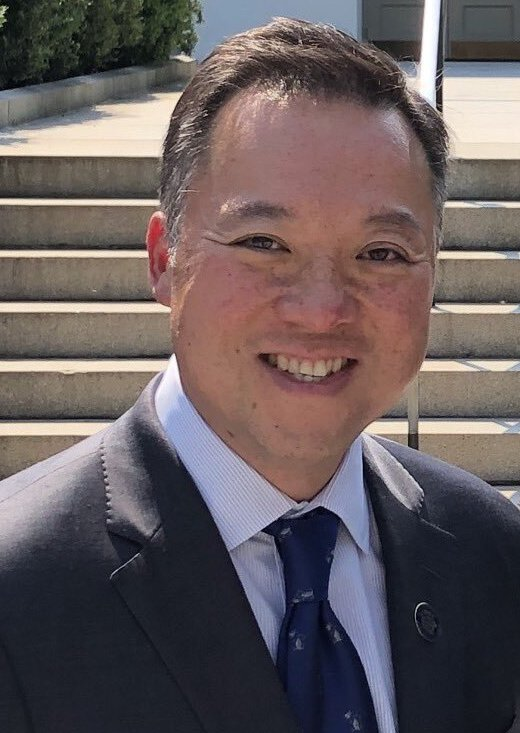

25th Attorney General of Connecticut
- Incumbent
- Assumed office January 9, 2019
- Governor: Ned Lamont
- Preceded by: George Jepsen

Member of the Connecticut House of Representatives from the 147th district
- In office January 3, 2007 – January 9, 2019
- Preceded by: Donald Sherer
- Succeeded by: Matt Blumenthal

Personal details
- Born: William Morten Tong; May 2, 1973 (age 53) Hartford, Connecticut, U.S.
- Party: Democratic
- Spouse: Elizabeth Hotchkiss
- Children: 3
- Education: Brown University (BA); University of Chicago (JD)

William Morten Tong (Chinese: 湯偉麟; pinyin: Tāng Wěilín, born May 2, 1973) is an American lawyer and progressive politician who is the 25th and current Attorney General of Connecticut. Born in Hartford, Connecticut, Tong attended Brown University and the University of Chicago Law School. He began his career as an attorney with the law firms Simpson Thacher & Bartlett and Finn Dixon & Herling. In 2006, Tong entered politics upon winning election to the Connecticut House of Representatives to represent the 147th district, which includes most of North Stamford. He served six terms in the House from 2007 to 2019. During this period, Tong chaired the banking committee from 2011 to 2015 and the judiciary committee from 2015 to 2019.

In 2018, Tong was elected attorney general of Connecticut. He took office on January 9, 2019, as the first Asian Pacific-American attorney general and constitutional officer elected statewide in Connecticut's history.

== Early life and education ==
William Tong grew up in West Hartford, Connecticut. His father, Ady, left China for Hong Kong during the Chinese Civil War, and his mother, Nancy, was a Taiwanese American who immigrated to the U.S. from Taiwan in the 1960s.

Tong graduated from the elite boarding school, Phillips Academy in Andover, Massachusetts. He received an undergraduate degree in classics with honors from Brown University in 1995. He earned a J.D. from the University of Chicago Law School in 2000.

== Legal career ==
Before his election as attorney general, Tong practiced law for 18 years as a litigator in both state and federal courts, first at Simpson Thacher & Bartlett in New York City and then at Finn Dixon & Herling LLP in Stamford.

== Public service ==
=== 2018 state attorney general campaign ===
In late 2017, Tong formed an exploratory committee to seek the Democratic nomination for Connecticut Attorney General in the 2018 election after incumbent George Jepsen announced he would not seek reelection.

Tong won the first contested Democratic convention for attorney general on May 20, 2018, with 63.3% of the vote, defeating three other candidates. He went on to win the first contested Democratic primary for attorney general on August 14, beating two other candidates with 57.3% of the vote.

Tong defeated Republican nominee Sue Hatfield in the general election by 78,394 votes, 6% of the total. According to the attorney general's office, he became the first elected Asian-American statewide official in Connecticut upon taking office.

=== Consumer protection ===
As attorney general, Tong is leading a coalition of 49 states in suing the major generic drug manufacturers for price fixing, which Tong called the “largest private sector cartel” in history during a May 12, 2019 segment on the CBS news program "60 Minutes."

Tong is also on the national executive committee of attorneys general who are leading the investigation and litigation to confront the opioid crisis, including Connecticut’s case against Purdue Pharma.

Tong was a part of a small group of state attorneys general who led the investigation against Equifax relating to a massive data breach in which millions of Americans' personal and confidential information was compromised, including more than 1.5 million residents of Connecticut. Equifax eventually agreed to a $700 million settlement, including $425 million in direct consumer relief and close to $5 million to the State of Connecticut.

=== "Firewall" against the Trump administration ===
During the 2018 campaign, Tong pledged to be a “firewall” against President Donald Trump and his policies. He joined other state attorneys general in challenging Trump, including his attempts to build a border wall and to add a citizenship question to the census. Tong has been a defender of the environment, taking numerous legal actions to protect clean air and water and to confront climate change.

=== State representative ===
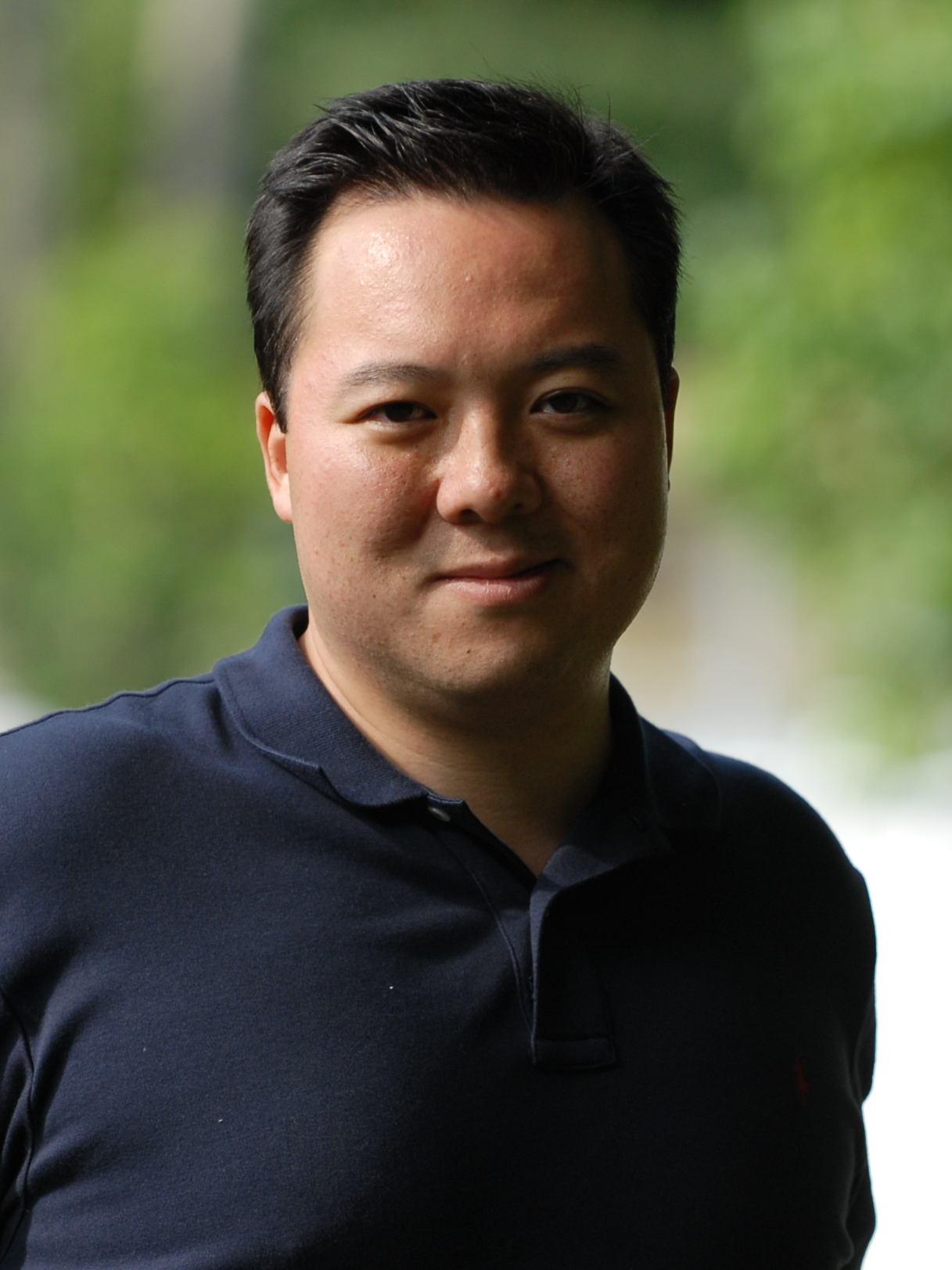
Tong as a state representative in 2007

From 2015 to 2019, Tong chaired the House Judiciary Committee. As chair, he was a key leader in Connecticut’s efforts to pass gun legislation.

As a freshman legislator, Tong wrote and passed the Lost and Stolen Firearms law to fight gun trafficking. After the tragedy at Sandy Hook, he played an integral role in overhauling Connecticut's gun laws. He then wrote and passed Lori Jackson's Law, a domestic violence gun law that requires the subject of a temporary restraining order to surrender all firearms and ammunition for at least 14 days. In 2018, Tong wrote and passed the law banning bump stocks.

During his 12 years in the House, Tong wrote and passed several laws to reform the criminal justice system, including Connecticut’s Second Chance Society law, which overhauled Connecticut's Criminal Justice Information System by eliminating mandatory minimum sentences for nonviolent drug possession crimes that have resulted in the mass incarceration of young people, particularly in Connecticut's cities.

Tong also helped write and pass legislation to protect homeowners in foreclosure in the wake of the 2008 financial crisis and to hold teachers and school officials accountable for failing to report instances of abuse and sexual misconduct by teachers and administrators involving students.

=== 2013 Stamford mayoral campaign ===
In February 2013, Tong announced his bid for mayor of Stamford after Mayor Michael Pavia announced he would not seek reelection. He lost the Democratic primary to David Martin by less than 200 votes.

=== 2012 U.S. Senate campaign ===
In May 2011, Tong announced he would seek the Democratic nomination for the U.S. Senate seat being vacated by Joe Lieberman. He faced Susan Bysiewicz, former secretary of state and now Connecticut's lieutenant governor, and Chris Murphy, the eventual winner, in the Democratic primary. He dropped out of the race a year later and endorsed Murphy.

The Tong campaign raised more than $550,000 in the quarter ending June 30, 2011. The final Federal Election Commission contribution tally was $1,063,993 for Team Tong.

=== Consideration for U.S. Attorney for the District of Connecticut ===
On March 7, 2009, it was reported that Tong was being considered by a panel assembled by former U.S. Senators Chris Dodd and Joe Lieberman to screen candidates for United States Attorney. On November 14, 2009, the Hartford Courant reported that the panel assembled had forwarded four names to the White House and President Barack Obama for consideration; Tong was a finalist on that list.

Party political offices
| Preceded by George Jepsen | Democratic nominee for Attorney General of Connecticut; 2018, 2022, 2026 | Most recent |
Legal offices
| Preceded by George Jepsen | Attorney General of Connecticut; 2019–present | Incumbent |
