= 2010 Connecticut Attorney General election =

2010 Connecticut attorney general election
- November 2, 2010
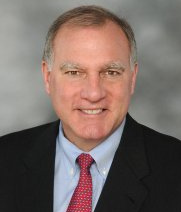

Nominee	George Jepsen	Martha Dean
Party	Democratic	Republican
Alliance	Working Families
Popular vote	591,725	480,310
Percentage	53.7%	43.6%
- Jepsen: 40–50% 50–60% 60–70% 70–80% 80–90% Dean: 40–50% 50–60% 60–70%
Attorney general before election
Richard Blumenthal
Democratic
Elected Attorney general
George Jepsen
Democratic

The 2010 Connecticut attorney general election was held on Tuesday, November 2, 2010, to elect the 24th attorney general of the state of Connecticut. Five-term incumbent attorney general Richard Blumenthal declined to seek re-election in 2010, instead opting to run for Connecticut's open U.S. Senate seat held by the retiring Christopher Dodd. Blumenthal's decision not to seek a sixth term set-up the first open race for attorney general in the state since Blumenthal's election in 1990.

At their May 2010 state convention, Democratic candidate George Jepsen won the endorsement of his party outright and did not face a primary challenger. The Republican candidate, Martha Dean, secured her party's nomination via a primary election defeat of Ross Garber on August 10.

== Candidates ==
=== Democratic ===
==== Announced ====
- Former State Senate Majority Leader George Jepsen

==== Declined ====
- Incumbent attorney general Richard Blumenthal
- Waterbury Mayor Michael Jarjura
- State Representative Cameron Staples

==== Disqualified ====
- Secretary of the State Susan Bysiewicz

==== Primary polling ====
Poll source	Dates administered	Susan Bysiewicz	George Jepsen	Michael Jarjura
Quinnipiac	March 9–15, 2010	54%	10%	—
Quinnipiac	January 14–19, 2010	62%	10%	3%

=== Republican ===
==== Announced ====
- Martha Dean, attorney from Avon and 2002 Republican attorney general nominee
- Ross Garber, attorney from Glastonbury and 2002 Republican nominee for state treasurer
- Kie Westby, attorney from Southbury
- State Representative Arthur O'Neill of Southbury

==== Declined ====
- Mayor Jason L. McCoy from Vernon, who later took his name out of consideration at the convention and nominated Ross Garber
- State Senator Andrew Roraback
- John Pavia, attorney from Easton, originally intended to seek the nomination, however, took his name out of consideration prior to the state convention

==== Primary polling ====
Poll source	Dates administered	Martha Dean	Andrew Roraback	John Pavia
Quinnipiac	March 9–15, 2010	9%	13%	8%

=== Other parties ===
- Green Party: Stephen Fournier

== Early campaign ==
On January 6, 2010, five-term Connecticut United States Senator Christopher Dodd announced that he would not seek re-election in 2010. On this same day, Richard Blumenthal, the 23rd and incumbent state attorney general, announced that he would not run for re-election for the state's top legal office and would instead seek the Democratic nomination for Dodd's Senate seat. Blumenthal had previously been considered a likely Democratic candidate for the 2012 Senate race, when incumbent Independent Democrat Joe Lieberman's seat is next up.

Blumenthal's decision not to seek re-election set-up the first open race for attorney general in the state since his election in 1990.

A week after Blumenthal's announcement, on January 13, 2010, Democratic Secretary of the State Susan Bysiewicz announced that she would run for her party's nomination for attorney general. Bysiewicz had previously declined seeking re-election to the Secretary of the State's office to instead run in the 2010 gubernatorial election, but dropped her candidacy when she switched to run for attorney general.

There was controversy about whether Bysiewicz was legally qualified to run for attorney general in Connecticut, as state law requires the attorney general to be "an attorney of law of at least 10 years' active practice" in the state. Bysiewicz worked at New York law firm White and Case for two years, then in Connecticut at Robinson and Cole from 1988 to 1992 and Aetna Insurance from 1992 to 1994, totaling six years of Connecticut practice. Her campaign stated that Bysiewicz was qualified to hold the attorney general position because her service as Secretary of the State counted toward the 10-year requirement, although she "acknowledged during a [March 31, 2010] deposition that she has virtually no experience as a litigator and has never argued a case before a judge."

On May 5, 2010, Superior Court Judge Michael Sheldon ruled that Bysiewicz was legally qualified to run for state attorney general. However, when the case reached the Connecticut Supreme Court on May 18, Justice Flemming L. Norcott, Jr. handed down the court's 7-0 unanimous ruling that Bysiewicz failed to meet the requirements of General Statutes Section 3–124, which outlines the qualifications for state attorney general. As a consequence, Bysiewicz could not run for attorney general in 2010, which left former State Senator George Jepsen the sole remaining Democratic candidate in the race.

== Nominations ==
George Jepsen won the Democratic nomination by acclamation at the party's state convention held on May 22, 2010.

Four Republicans contested their party's nomination at their May 22 state convention, with the convention endorsing Martha Dean. Ross Garber, whose sister-in-law is Democrat Susan Bysiewicz, attracted sufficient support to qualify for an August 10, 2010 primary and challenged Dean for the nomination. Dean then defeated Garber in the GOP primary.

=== Republican primary ===
Republican primary results
Party	Candidate	Votes	%
Republican	Martha Dean	68,309	60.50
Republican	Ross Garber	44,603	39.50
Total votes		112,912	100

== General election ==
=== Debates ===
On September 23, 2010, Martha Dean and George Jepsen participated in a debate sponsored by the Connecticut Law Tribune and the University of Connecticut School of Law in Hartford. In the debate, Dean stated that "ending the job-killing practices of the attorney general and restoring common sense to the office of attorney general" were priorities in the election, and that the size of the office and the scope of lawsuits filed by it should be reduced. Jepsen argued that Dean's desire to reduce the office's role might be counterproductive, and criticized her for wishing to join about 20 other states in challenging the federal government on the federal healthcare reforms enacted earlier in the year.

Dean and Jepsen met again for a second debate on October 11 at the Quinnipiac University School of Law in Hamden.

=== Polling ===
Poll source	Dates administered	George Jepsen (D)	Martha Dean (R)
Suffolk University	October 19–20, 2010	40%	28%

=== Martha Dean lawsuit ===
Claiming that Jepsen was not qualified to hold office, Dean filed a lawsuit on October 26 requesting the courts remove Jepsen from the following week's ballot. Dean's rationale for bringing the lawsuit forward was based on Jepsen's admission that he did not have a background in litigation and the fact that he lacked admission to argue cases before the U.S. Court of Appeals for the Second Circuit and the U.S. Supreme Court. One day after the election, on November 3, Superior Court judge Julia Aurigemma granted a dismissal of the lawsuit, stating in her decision that, "In this case, there is no statutory authority that authorizes [Dean] to bring her ... action prior to the election." Reacting to the decision, Dean said that the campaign was "evaluating the decision and our options and will take whatever steps are necessary to ensure that Connecticut has an attorney general who is fully qualified to vigorously represent the state's interests in court." In his reaction, Jepsen said that the lawsuit had been a "publicity stunt" and that he "was never worried about the merits of the case in court."

=== Results ===
2010 Connecticut Attorney General election
Party	Candidate	Votes	%
Democratic	George Jepsen	568,857	51.6
Working Families	George Jepsen	22,868	2.1
Total	George Jepsen	591,725	53.7
Republican	Martha Dean	480,310	43.6
Independent Party	Stephen E.D. Fournier	15,011	1.4
Green	Stephen E.D. Fournier	14,748	1.3
Total	Stephen E.D. Fournier	29,759	2.7
Total votes		1,101,794	100
Democratic hold			

==== By congressional district ====
Jepsen won four of five congressional districts, with Dean winning the remaining one, which elected a Democrat.

District	Jepsen	Dean	Representative
1st	60%	37%	John B. Larson
2nd	52%	45%	Joe Courtney
3rd	59%	39%	Rosa DeLauro
4th	50%	48%	Jim Himes
5th	48.5%	48.6%	Chris Murphy
