= George Jepsen =

American lawyer and politician (born 1954)

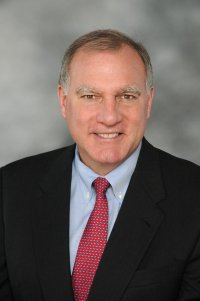

24th Attorney General of Connecticut
- In office January 5, 2011 – January 9, 2019
- Governor: Dan Malloy
- Preceded by: Richard Blumenthal
- Succeeded by: William Tong

Chair of the Connecticut Democratic Party
- In office December 13, 2002 – January 2005
- Preceded by: John Olsen
- Succeeded by: Nancy DiNardo

Majority Leader of the Connecticut State Senate
- In office January 8, 1997 – 2003
- Preceded by: James T. Fleming
- Succeeded by: Martin Looney

Member of the Connecticut State Senate from the 27th district
- In office January 9, 1991 – January 2003
- Preceded by: Richard Blumenthal
- Succeeded by: Andrew McDonald

Member of the Connecticut House of Representatives from the 148th district
- In office January 7, 1987 – January 9, 1991
- Preceded by: Richard Cunningham
- Succeeded by: Anne McDonald

Personal details
- Born: November 23, 1954 (age 71) Hattiesburg, Mississippi, U.S.
- Party: Democratic
- Spouse: Diana Sousa
- Children: 2
- Education: Dartmouth College (BA); Harvard University (MPP, JD)
- Website: Government website

George Christian Jepsen (born November 23, 1954) is an American lawyer and politician who served as the 24th attorney general of Connecticut from 2011 to 2019.

Jepsen was a State Senator from Connecticut's 27th Senate district, representing Stamford and part of Darien, and served in the Connecticut Senate from 1991 to 2003. During his time in the Senate, he served as Senate Majority Leader from 1997 to 2003. Prior to that, he served in the Connecticut House of Representatives from 1987 to 1991, representing part of Stamford in Connecticut's 148th House district. After leaving the State Senate, he became Chairman of the Connecticut State Democratic Party from 2003 to 2005.

== Early life and education ==
Jepsen was born in Hattiesburg, Mississippi. A Phi Beta Kappa graduate of Dartmouth College, he earned his J.D. degree from Harvard Law School with honors and also earned a master's degree in public policy from the Kennedy School of Government. To help pay for his education, he worked as a teaching fellow in constitutional law for former Watergate prosecutor Archibald Cox.

== Career ==
Following graduation, Jepsen worked as staff counsel for Carpenters Local Union 210 for Western Connecticut for nearly ten years, which included such responsibilities as negotiating contracts for wages and benefits, representing injured workers, ensuring job safety, and advocating for different bidding practices. In private practice, Jepsen was employed at several Connecticut's law firms, which included work with the probate court, estate planning, representing small business in contract negotiations, government compliance, and real estate transactions. He also served as a defendant in criminal and civil courts.

=== Connecticut General Assembly (1987–2003) ===
In 1984, Jepsen attempted to primary Democratic Senator of the 27th district Anthony Truglia. Endorsed by Stamford Mayor Thom Serrani and former House Speaker Ernst N. Abate, he lost 51% to 49%.

Jepsen served 16 years in the Connecticut General Assembly, first as State Representative from the 148th House District and then as a State Senator from Connecticut's 27th Senate District, the last six as Majority Leader. As a legislator, Jepsen worked in a variety of areas including clean energy, gun safety, and civil rights. Jepsen assisted in the development of laws that reformed HMO and insurance practices. As Senate Majority Leader, Jepsen worked to develop bills that protect Connecticut's natural assets. Jepsen co-authored the Open Space Trust Fund, an initiative that sets aside $10 million in funding for the purchase of open space. Jepsen worked to pass legislation to revitalize blighted areas in brownfields, including efforts to expand state financial assistance to re-developers. This was incentivized by tax credits to businesses that invested in redevelopment of contaminated properties in the state. Jepsen helped the passage of legislation to replace Connecticut's "Sooty Six" power plants with more ecological plants that have lower level of CO2 emissions. These six old coal-burning plants were contributing to Connecticut's unique air pollution problem and rise in asthma rates. This initiative also involved new funding to upgrade sewage treatment plants for cleaner rivers.

As Senate Majority Leader, Jepsen became a national leader against the National Rifle Association. He helped pass legislation prohibiting the sale or possession of assault weapons, mandating trigger locks, and necessitating tougher background checks. This work was nationally recognized by the Brady Campaign and the Million Mom March. Jepsen worked to ban sexual orientation discrimination, strengthen hate crime laws, and expand Connecticut's living will laws. Jepsen supported health insurance reform to improve covered services for mental illness and emergency room conditions. He helped mandate that health insurers cover the costs of mammograms and birth control and helped pass legislation to outlaw "drive-through" mastectomies and childbirth deliveries, so insurers cover at least a 48-hour hospital stay.

=== 2010–2018 Connecticut Attorney General ===
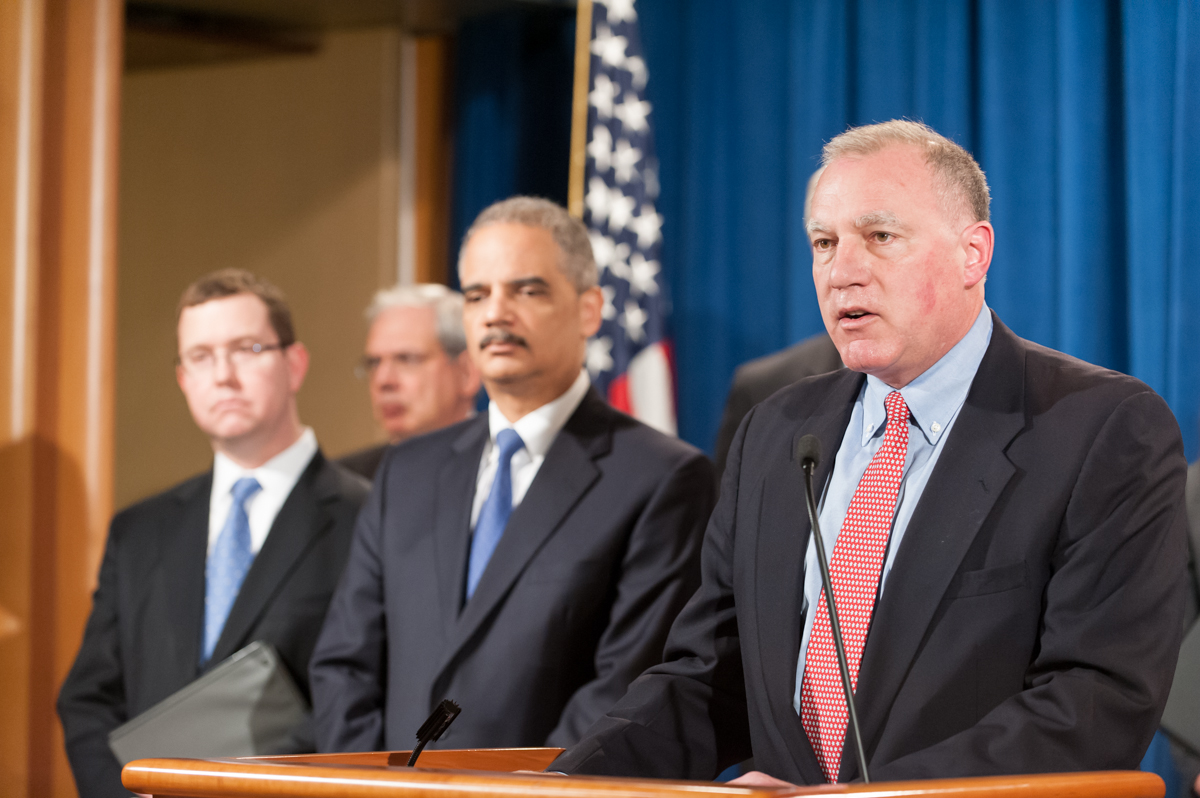
George Jepsen speaking at a Department of Justice presentation.

Jepsen announced on January 6, 2010, that he would form an exploratory committee for Attorney General, receiving the Democratic Party's endorsement on May 22. On July 12 Jepsen announced he had qualified for public financing in the Citizens Election Program. On November 2, 2010, he was elected as attorney general of Connecticut

Jepsen was reelected in 2014, defeating Republican opponent Kie Westby.

== Electoral history ==
Connecticut State Senate 27th District Democratic primary, 1984
Party	Candidate	Votes	%
Democratic	Anthony Truglia (Inc.)	3,826	51.39
Democratic	George Jepsen	3,619	48.61

Connecticut House of Representatives 148th District Election, 1986
Party	Candidate	Votes	%
Democratic	George Jepsen	2,779	53.72
Republican	Marie Hawe	2,394	46.28

Connecticut House of Representatives 148th District Election, 1988
Party	Candidate	Votes	%
Democratic	George Jepsen (inc.)	4,263	55.28
Republican	James Rubino	3,448	44.72

Connecticut State Senate 27th District Election, 1990
Party	Candidate	Votes	%
Democratic	George Jepsen	11,827	52.10
Republican	Werner Depuy	10,082	44.41
Petition	Richard Cunningham	793	3.49

Connecticut State Senate 27th District Election, 1992
Party	Candidate	Votes	%
Democratic*	George Jepsen (inc.)	18,692	54.12
Republican	Nick Pavia	15,843	45.88

*Jepsen was also listed on the A Connecticut Party line.

Connecticut State Senate 27th District Election, 1994
Party	Candidate	Votes	%
Democratic	George Jepsen (inc.)	11,545	60.82
Republican	Mike Morris	7,438	39.18

Connecticut State Senate 27th District Election, 1996
Party	Candidate	Votes	%
Democratic	George Jepsen (inc.)	19,212	63.97
Republican	Vincent Mobilio	10,820	36.03

Connecticut State Senate 27th District Election, 1998
Party	Candidate	Votes	%
Democratic	George Jepsen (inc.)	13,071	66.76
Republican	Joseph Valdes	6,509	33.24

Connecticut State Senate 27th District, 2000
Party	Candidate	Votes	%
Democratic	George Jepsen (inc.)	19,732	66.69
Republican	Joseph Bongiorno	9,855	33.31

Connecticut Attorney General Election, 2010
Party	Candidate	Votes	%
Democratic*	George Jepsen	591,725	53.71
Republican	Martha Dean	480,310	43.59
Green*	Stephen Fournier	29,759	2.70

*Jepsen was also listed on the Working Families Party line; Fournier was also listed on the Independent Party line.

Connecticut Attorney General Election, 2014
Party	Candidate	Votes	%
Democratic*	George Jepsen (inc.)	590,225	56.73
Republican*	Kie Westby	427,869	41.12
Green	Stephen Fournier	22,361	2.15

*Jepsen was also listed on the Working Families Party line; Westby was also listed on the Independent Party line.

Connecticut House of Representatives
Preceded by Richard Cunningham	Member of the Connecticut House of Representatives from the 148th district 1987–1991	Succeeded by Anne McDonald
Connecticut State Senate
Preceded by Richard Blumenthal	Member of the Connecticut State Senate from the 27th district 1991–2003	Succeeded by Andrew McDonald
Preceded by James T. Fleming	Majority Leader of the Connecticut State Senate; 1997–2003	Succeeded by Martin Looney
Party political offices
Preceded by Richard Blumenthal	Democratic nominee for Connecticut Attorney General; 2010, 2014	Succeeded by William Tong
Preceded by Joe Courtney	Democratic nominee for Lieutenant Governor of Connecticut; 2002	Succeeded by Mary Glassman
Preceded by John Olsen	Chair of the Connecticut Democratic Party; 2003–2005	Succeeded by Nancy DiNardo
Legal offices
Preceded by Dick Blumenthal	Attorney General of Connecticut; 2011–2019	Succeeded by William Tong
