= Charles Phelps (politician) =

American attorney and politician (1852–1940)

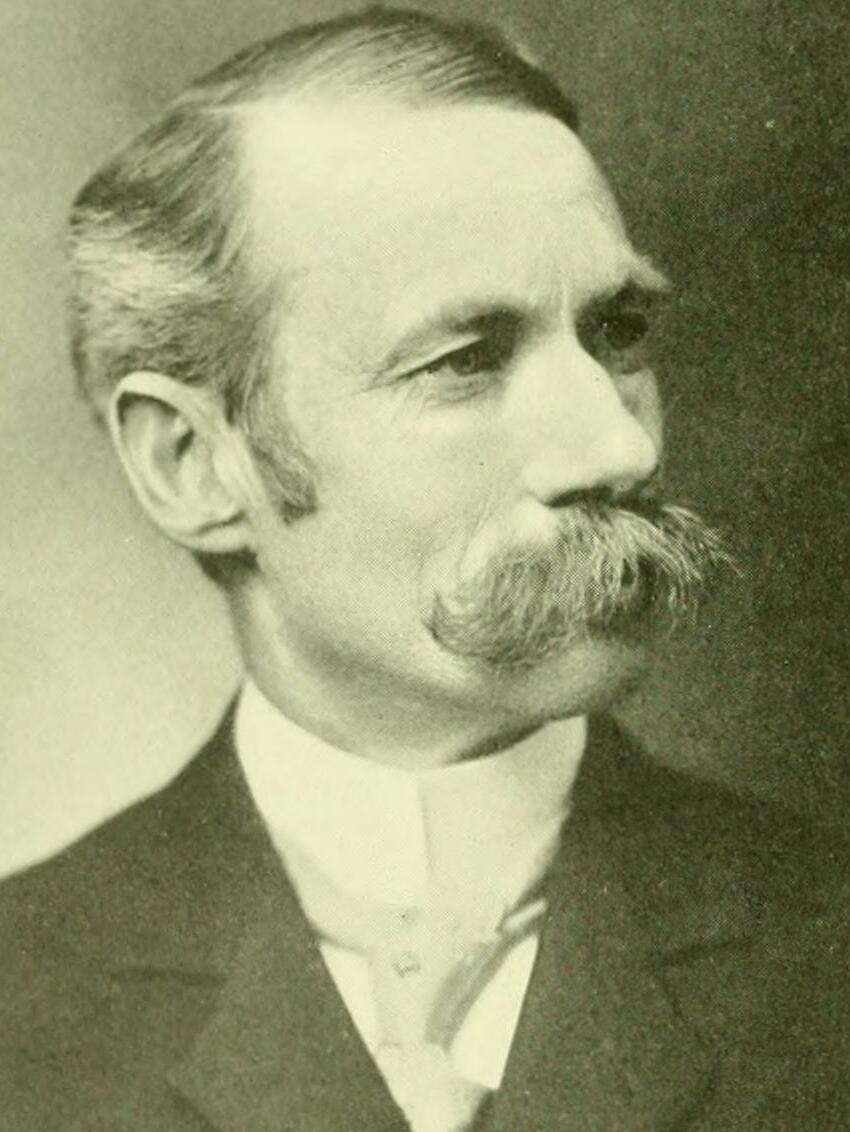

Connecticut Attorney General
- In office 1899–1903
- Preceded by: Office established
- Succeeded by: William A. King

Secretary of the State of Connecticut
- In office 1897–1899
- Preceded by: William C. Mowry
- Succeeded by: Huber Clark

Member of the Connecticut General Assembly
- In office 1885–1897

Personal details
- Born: 1852 East Hartford, Connecticut, US
- Died: February 3, 1940 (aged 87) Daytona Beach, Florida, US
- Party: Republican
- Education: Wesleyan University (BA, MA)
- Occupation: Lawyer, politician
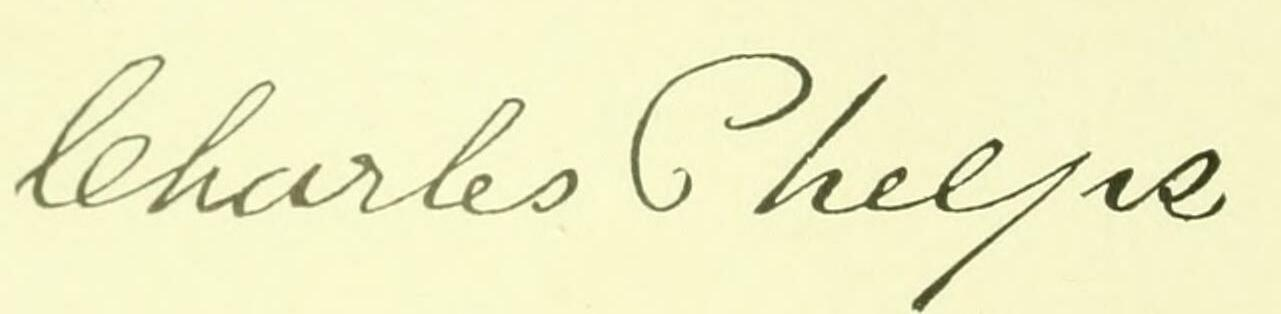
- Signature

Charles Phelps (1852–1940) was an American lawyer and politician who served as the first Connecticut attorney general from 1899 to 1903. He also served as Connecticut secretary of state (1897–99), a member of the Connecticut State Senate representing the 23rd district (1893–97) and the Connecticut House of Representatives (1885–1893), and coroner (1883–99) and district attorney for Tolland County (1904–15).

== Early life and education ==
Phelps was born in East Hartford, Connecticut, on August 10, 1852, to parents Benjamin C. Phelps, a Methodist minister who served as chaplain and librarian of the Connecticut State Prison in Wethersfield, and Sarah Parker Humphrey. He attended East Greenwich Academy, earned his bachelor's degree from Wesleyan University in 1875, and was admitted to the Connecticut bar in 1877. Wesleyan later awarded him a Master of Arts degree.

== Career ==
Phelps practiced law throughout his adult life. He served as counsel (1890–92) and prosecutor (1890–97) for the town of Rockville. He was the first coroner of Tolland County, serving for sixteen years before stepping down to become the state's attorney general. After leaving state service, Phelps served as district attorney for Tolland County for over a decade. He was also a delegate to the 1902 state constitutional convention.

Phelps was a member of the American Bar Association and the Connecticut Bar Association, serving as president of the latter association from 1914 to 1916. He was also president of the Tolland County Bar Association. He became a director of the Rockville National Bank in 1903 and its vice president in 1915. He was a trustee of Rockville Public Library and trustee and president of the George Sykes Manual Training School.

Phelps was a lifelong member of the Republican Party. He was also a member of Psi Upsilon and the Freemasons.

The Charles Phelps House, a Georgian Revival mansion built in 1905, is part of the Rockville Historic District.

== Personal life ==
Phelps married Leila Loomis Bill (1861–1888) in 1881. Twelve years after his first wife's death, he married Elsie Edith Sykes (1870–1965) in 1900.

Phelps died in Daytona Beach, Florida, on February 3, 1940, at the age of 87. He was interred at Grove Hill Cemetery in Rockville.

Political offices
Preceded by None	Connecticut Attorney General; 1899–1903	Succeeded by William A. King
Preceded by William C. Mowry	Secretary of the State of Connecticut; 1897–1899	Succeeded by Huber Clark
