= Francis A. Pallotti =

American politician

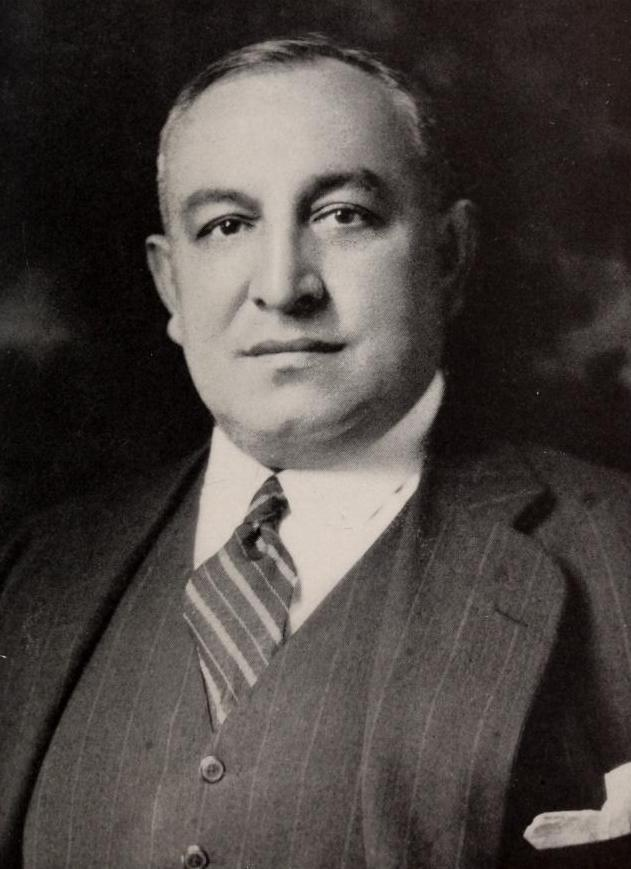
- Pallotti in 1940

12th Attorney General of Connecticut
- In office January 4, 1939 – January 3, 1945
- Governor: Raymond E. Baldwin; Robert A. Hurley
- Preceded by: Dennis P. O'Connor
- Succeeded by: William L. Hadden

50th Secretary of the State of Connecticut
- In office January 3, 1923 – January 2, 1929
- Governor: Charles A. Templeton; John H. Trumbull
- Preceded by: Donald J. Warner
- Succeeded by: William L. Higgins

Personal details
- Born: August 21, 1886 Hartford, Connecticut, U.S.
- Died: December 21, 1946 (aged 60) New Haven, Connecticut, U.S.
- Party: Republican
- Education: College of the Holy Cross (BA); Yale University (LLB)

Francis A. Pallotti (August 21, 1886 – December 21, 1946) was an American politician who served as the Secretary of the State of Connecticut from 1923 to 1929 and as the Attorney General of Connecticut from 1939 to 1945.

A Republican from Hartford, Connecticut, Pallotti graduated with a Bachelor of Arts from the College of the Holy Cross in 1908 and earned his Bachelor of Laws (LLB) from Yale Law School in 1911. He also served as a judge of the Hartford city police court from 1917 to 1921.
