= Benjamin W. Alling =

American politician (1879–1950)

7th Attorney General of Connecticut
- In office 1927–1931
- Governor: John H. Trumbull
- Preceded by: Frank E. Healy
- Succeeded by: Warren B. Burrows

Member of the Connecticut House of Representatives from New Britain
- In office 1922–1926

Personal details
- Born: November 7, 1879 Hartford, Connecticut, U.S.
- Died: February 24, 1950 (aged 70) New Britain, Connecticut, U.S.
- Party: Republican
- Education: Dartmouth College; Harvard Law School

Benjamin W. Alling (November 7, 1879 – February 24, 1950) was an American politician who served in the Connecticut House of Representatives from the New Britain district from 1922 to 1926 and as the Attorney General of Connecticut from 1927 to 1931.
