= Warren Booth Burrows =

American judge (1877–1952)

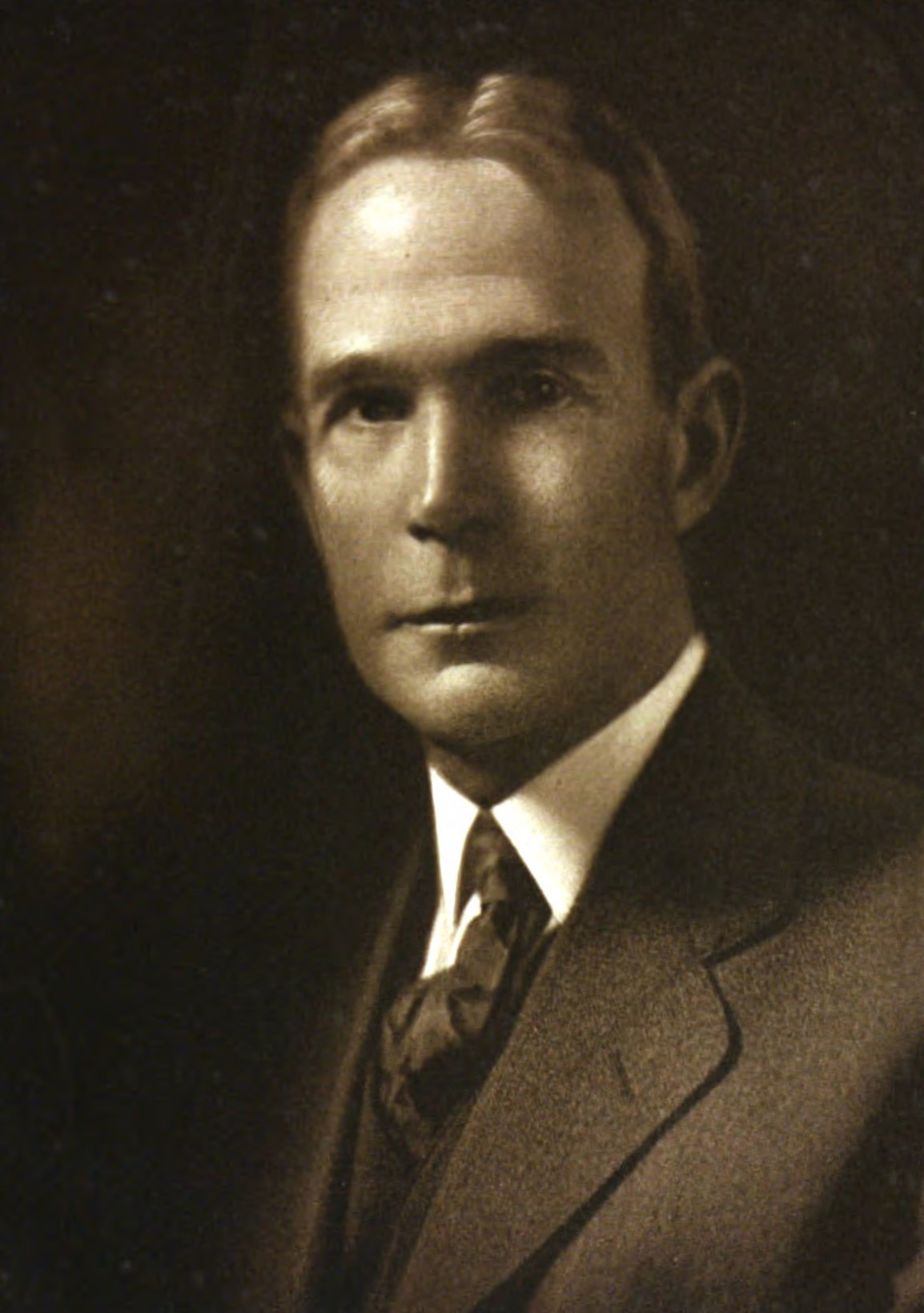

8th Attorney General of Connecticut
- In office January 7, 1931 – January 2, 1935
- Governor: Wilbur Lucius Cross
- Preceded by: Benjamin W. Alling
- Succeeded by: Edward J. Daly

Judge of the United States District Court for the District of Connecticut
- In office February 16, 1928 – October 20, 1930
- Appointed by: Calvin Coolidge
- Preceded by: Seat established by 44 Stat. 1348
- Succeeded by: Carroll C. Hincks

Member of the Connecticut House of Representatives
- In office 1925-1927

Personal details
- Born: Warren Booth Burrows; September 14, 1877 Poquonock Bridge, Connecticut, U.S.
- Died: December 8, 1952 (aged 75) Poquonock Bridge, Connecticut, U.S.
- Education: University of Michigan Law School (LL.B.)

Warren Booth Burrows (September 14, 1877 – December 8, 1952) was a United States district judge of the United States District Court for the District of Connecticut and the 8th Attorney General of Connecticut.

== Education and career ==
Born in Poquonock Bridge, Connecticut, Burrows received a Bachelor of Laws from University of Michigan Law School in 1904. He was in private practice of law in New London, Connecticut from 1905 to 1906. He was an assistant state's attorney of New London from 1906 to 1916. He was state's attorney of New London from 1917 to 1927. He was a member of the Connecticut House of Representatives from 1925 to 1927 and the Connecticut Senate from 1927 to 1928.

== Federal judicial service ==
Burrows was nominated by President Calvin Coolidge on February 3, 1928, to the United States District Court for the District of Connecticut, to a new seat authorized by 44 Stat. 1348. He was confirmed by the United States Senate on February 16, 1928, and received his commission the same day. His service terminated on October 20, 1930, due to his resignation.

== Later career and death ==
Following his resignation from the federal bench, Burrows served as the 8th Attorney General of Connecticut from 1931 to 1935. He died in Poquonock Bridge on December 8, 1952.

== Sources ==
Legal offices
Preceded by Seat established by 44 Stat. 1348	Judge of the United States District Court for the District of Connecticut; 1928–1930	Succeeded by Carroll C. Hincks
Preceded by Benjamin W. Alling	8th Attorney General of Connecticut; 1931–1935	Succeeded by Edward J. Daly
