= Connecticut Attorney General =

Attorney general for the U.S. state of Connecticut

- Seal of the attorney general

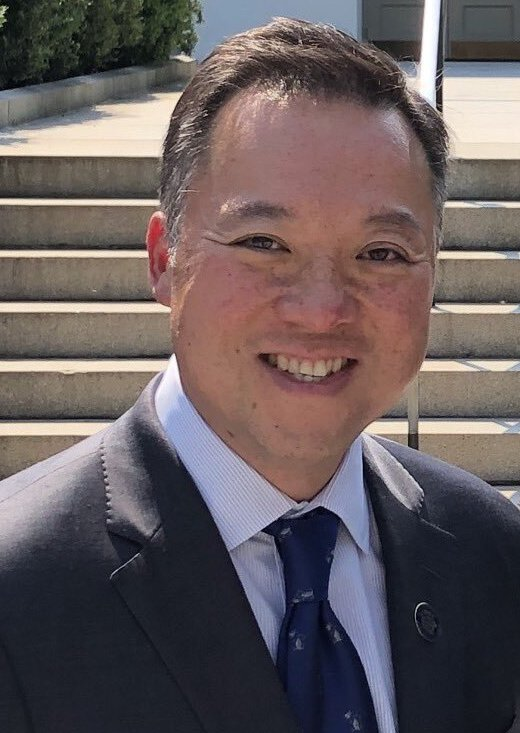
- Incumbent; William Tong since January 9, 2019
- Department of Law
- Style: The Honorable
- Term length: Four years No limit
- Constituting instrument: Constitution of Connecticut, Executive Law
- Formation: 1897
- First holder: Charles Phelps
- Succession: Election by joint session of Connecticut General Assembly
- Website: portal.ct.gov/ag

The Connecticut attorney general is the state attorney general of Connecticut.

The attorney general is elected to a four-year term. According to state statute, eligibility for the office requires being "an attorney at law of at least ten years' active practice at the bar of this state." A State Supreme Court ruling from 2010, Bysiewicz v. Dinardo Et Al. (SC 18612) attempted to clarify this statute. The court's ruling sets a de facto 10-year residency requirement for candidates and bars those with no litigation experience, although "litigation experience" was left undefined. These requirements are stronger than other states in the area. In New York, the only requirements are being a resident for five years and at least 30 years old. In Massachusetts, the only requirements are being admitted to the state bar and having US citizenship for five years.

The Office of the Attorney General was officially created by the Connecticut General Assembly in 1897. The current attorney general is William Tong, a Democrat serving since January 9, 2019.

Unlike other states, the Connecticut Attorney General is not responsible for criminal prosecution in Connecticut. In Connecticut the Attorney General generally exercises only civil jurisdiction. The Connecticut Division of Criminal Justice is responsible for the investigation and prosecution of all criminal matters in the State of Connecticut overseen by the Chief State's Attorney.

== List of attorneys general ==
Parties

Democratic (12) Republican (13)

| Image | Name | Town | Political party | Term |
|---|---|---|---|---|
| | Charles Phelps | Vernon | Republican | 1899–1903 |
| | William A. King | Windham | Republican | 1903–1907 |
| | Marcus H. Holcomb | Southington | Republican | 1907–1910 |
| | John H. Light | Norwalk | Republican | 1910–1915 |
| | George E. Hinman | Windham | Republican | 1915–1919 |
| | Frank E. Healy | Windsor Locks | Republican | 1919–1927 |
| | Benjamin W. Alling | New Britain | Republican | 1927–1931 |
| | Warren B. Burrows | Groton | Republican | 1931–1935 |
| | Edward J. Daly | Hartford | Democratic | 1935–1937 |
| | Charles J. McLaughlin | West Hartford | Democratic | 1937–1938 |
| | Dennis P. O'Connor | Hartford | Democratic | 1938–1939 |
| | Francis A. Pallotti | Hartford | Republican | 1939–1945 |
| | William L. Hadden | West Haven | Republican | 1945–1951 |
| | George C. Conway | Guilford | Republican | 1951–1953 |
| | William L. Beers | New Haven | Republican | 1953–1955 |
| | John J. Bracken | Hartford | Republican | 1955–1959 |
| | Albert L. Coles | Bridgeport | Democratic | 1959–1963 |
| | Harold M. Mulvey | New Haven | Democratic | 1963–1968 |
| | Robert K. Killian | Hartford | Democratic | 1968–1975 |
| | Carl R. Ajello | Ansonia | Democratic | 1975–1983 |
| | Joe Lieberman | Stamford | Democratic | 1983–1989 |
| | Clarine Nardi Riddle | New Haven | Democratic | 1989–1991 |
| | Richard Blumenthal | Greenwich | Democratic | 1991–2011 |
| | George Jepsen | Hartford | Democratic | 2011–2019 |
| | William Tong | Stamford | Democratic | 2019– |

== See also ==
- 2010 Connecticut Attorney General election
- 2014 Connecticut Attorney General election
- 2018 Connecticut Attorney General election
- 2022 Connecticut Attorney General election
