= Francis R. Richmond =

American architect (1851–1907)

Francis Richard Richmond
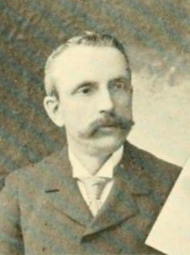
- Francis R. Richmond, circa 1896
- Born: April 20, 1851; Shelburne Falls, Massachusetts
- Died: November 6, 1907 (aged 56); Springfield, Massachusetts
- Occupation: Architect

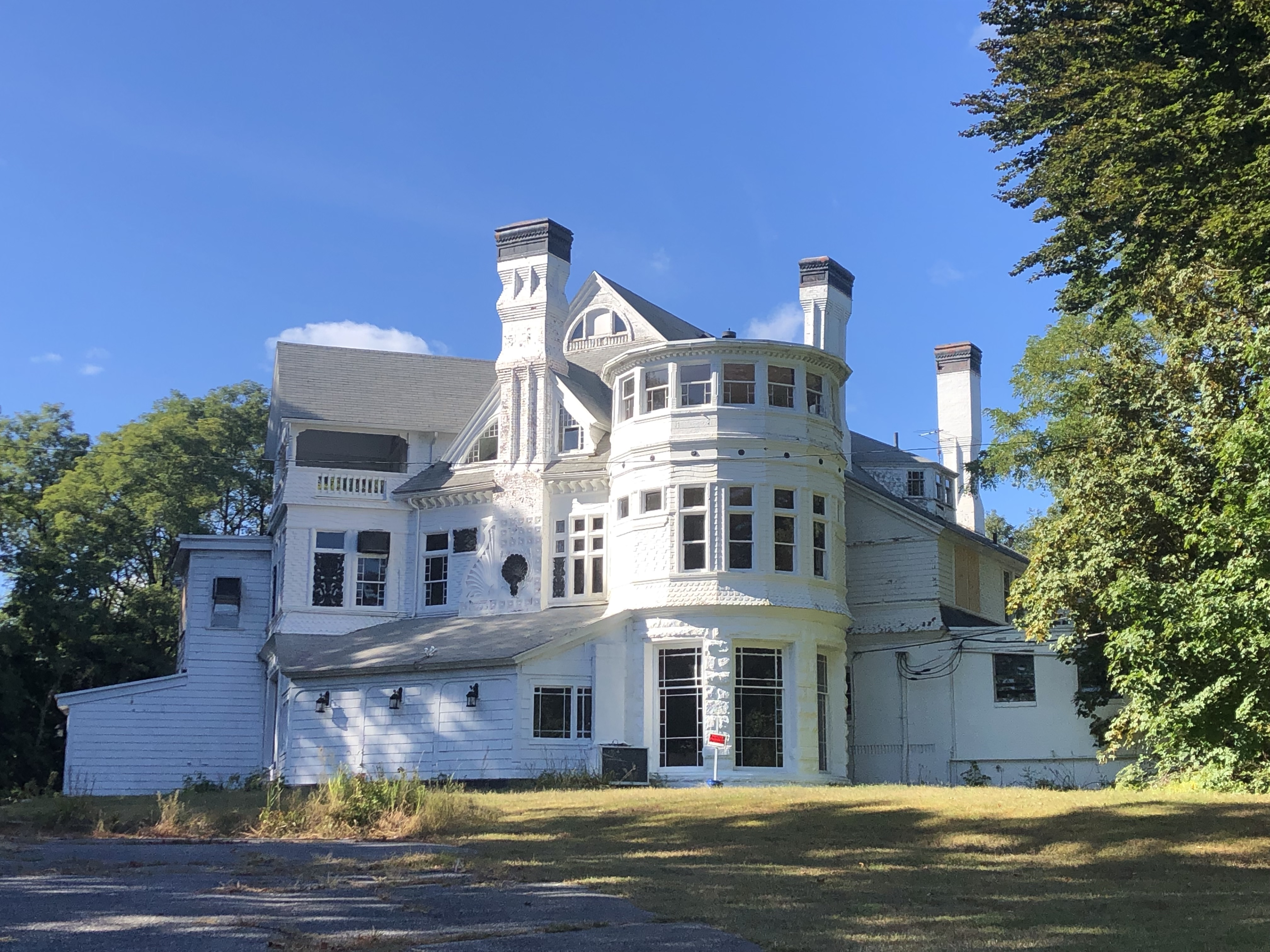
The country house of Daniel B. Wesson, co-founder of Smith & Wesson, in Northborough, Massachusetts, designed by Richmond & Seabury in 1883 and completed in 1886.

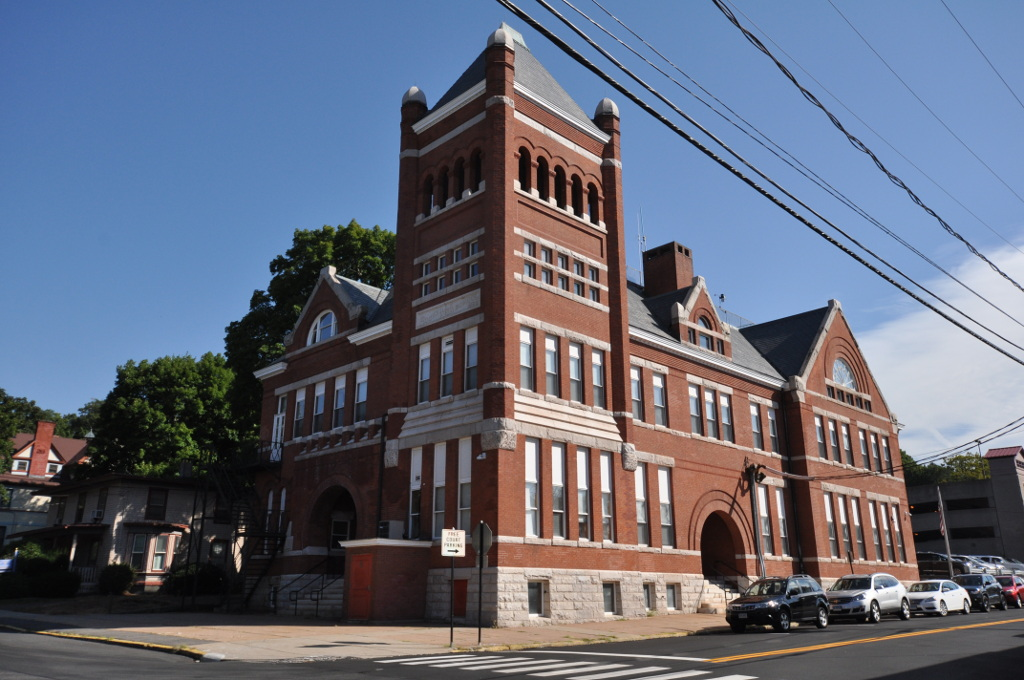
The former Rockville High School in Rockville, Connecticut, designed by F. R. Richmond in 1892.

Francis R. Richmond (1851-1907) was an American architect practicing in Springfield, Massachusetts.

== Life and career ==
Francis Richard Richmond was born April 20, 1851, in Shelburne Falls, Massachusetts to Otis Abiathar Richmond and Laura Elmer (Ware) Richmond. He was educated in the public schools and academy of Townshend, Vermont and trained as a carpenter in Amherst. As a young man he moved to Springfield, where he was educated in architecture in the office of Eugene C. Gardner. He remained with Gardner until 1882, when he formed a partnership with B. Hammett Seabury, practicing as Richmond & Seabury. They worked together until 1890, when the partnership was dissolved and each opened an independent office. Richmond practiced in Springfield until his death in 1907.

== Personal life ==
Richmond was married, and had four children. He was a member of the Masons and the Odd Fellows. In 1896 he was a representative from the 8th Hampden district in the Massachusetts House of Representatives as a Democrat.

The Richmond family home was at 20 Greenleaf Street in the Forest Park neighborhood, which Richmond had built in 1893.

Richmond died November 6, 1907, at the age of 56.

== Legacy ==
Richmond was the architect of at least four buildings that have been listed on the United States National Register of Historic Places, and others contribute to listed historic districts.

== Architectural works ==
Richmond's work was designed in the popular styles of the day. During his partnership with Seabury his buildings relied on Queen Anne models, as well as the contemporary works of H. H. Richardson. Later, in the aftermath of the World's Columbian Exposition in 1893, Richmond turned towards Classical, Renaissance and Colonial sources.

=== List of architectural works ===
(Note: Projects dated before 1890 are credited to Richmond & Seabury.)

- Hope Congregational Church, Springfield, Massachusetts (1882–83, burned 1931)
- "The Cliffs" for Daniel B. Wesson, (Note: Later known as White Cliffs.) Northborough, Massachusetts (1883–86)
- Oak Street School, Springfield, Massachusetts (1883, burned)
- "Pecousic Villa" for Everett H. Barney, Springfield, Massachusetts (1883–85, demolished 1959)
- Chapel and gate, Oak Grove Cemetery, Springfield, Massachusetts (1884)
- Meriden High School (former), Meriden, Connecticut (1884–85)
- W C A Boarding House, Springfield, Massachusetts (1884, NRHP 1983, demolished 2015)
- House for Justin Spaulding, (Note: Now the Office of Admissions of Elms College.) Chicopee, Massachusetts (1885–86)
- School for Christian Workers Building, Springfield, Massachusetts (1885–86 and 1889, demolished)
- National Needle Company Factory, Springfield, Massachusetts (1886)
- House for Andrew L. Fennessy, Springfield, Massachusetts (1887–88, burned 1968)
- Tapley School (former), Springfield, Massachusetts (1887)
- Worker housing for the Otis Company, Ware, Massachusetts (1887)
- Center School, East Longmeadow, Massachusetts (1888–89, demolished 1971)
- Memorial Building, (Note: Home to Vernon town offices as well as the New England Civil War Museum.) Rockville, Connecticut (1888–89)
- Jefferson Avenue School (former), Springfield, Massachusetts (1888)
- Palmer High School (former), Palmer, Massachusetts (1888)
- Second Congregational Church, Manchester, Connecticut (1888–89)
- Alden Street School (former), Springfield, Massachusetts (1889)
- Rockville National Bank Building, Rockville, Connecticut (1889)
- Bridge Street School, Suffield, Connecticut (1890, demolished)
- Chicopee High School (former), Chicopee, Massachusetts (1890–91, burned 1916)
- North Main Street Fire Station (former), Springfield, Massachusetts (1892)
- Rockville High School (former), Rockville, Connecticut (1892, NRHP 1981)
- Masonic Temple, Springfield, Massachusetts (1892–93, altered)
- Stacy Building, Springfield, Massachusetts (1893, NRHP 1983)
- Alvord School (former), Chicopee, Massachusetts (1894)
- Memorial Church Parish House, Springfield, Massachusetts (1894–95)
- South Main Street School (former), Springfield, Massachusetts (1895, NRHP 1985)
- Springfield Industrial Institute, Springfield, Massachusetts (1895, demolished)
- Additions to the Ocean House, (Note: Addition of the two rear wings.) Watch Hill, Rhode Island (1897 and 1902, demolished 2005)
- Eastern Avenue School (former), Springfield, Massachusetts (1898)
- Davis Street School, Greenfield, Massachusetts (1901–02, demolished)
- Westminster Apartments, Springfield, Massachusetts (1901)
- Springfield Homestead Building, Springfield, Massachusetts (1903)
- Palmer National and Savings Banks Building, Palmer, Massachusetts (1904–05, demolished)
- Thorndike School (former), Palmer, Massachusetts (1904)
- Odd Fellows Building, Springfield, Massachusetts (1905, demolished)
- Three Rivers School (former), Palmer, Massachusetts (1907)

== Gallery of architectural works ==
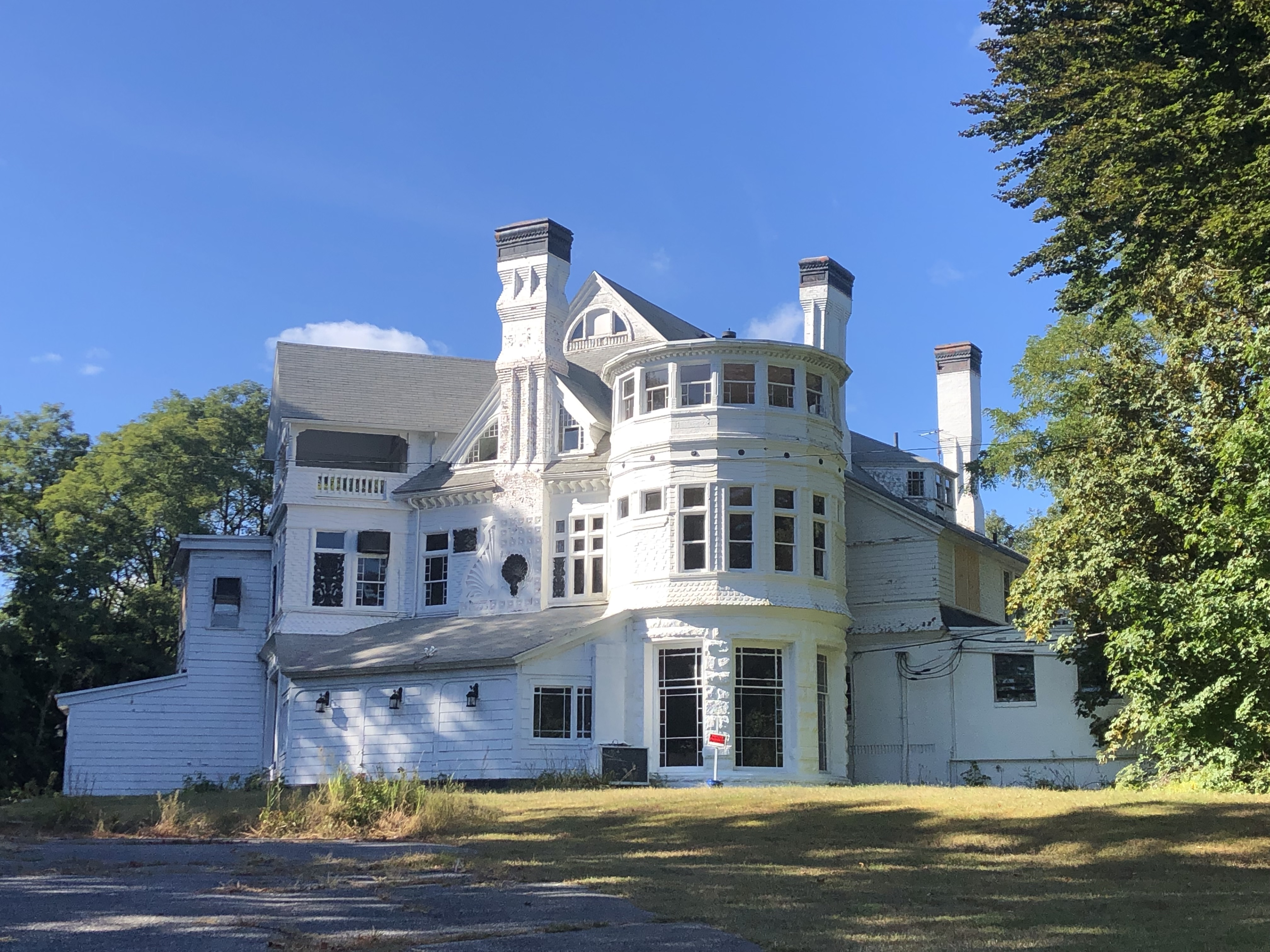
The Cliffs, Northborough, Massachusetts, 1883-86.

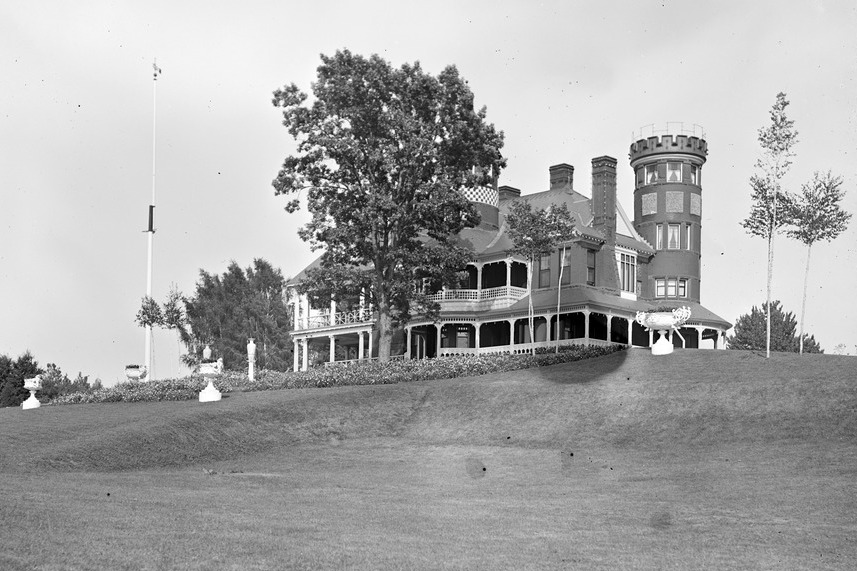
Pecousic Villa, Springfield, Massachusetts, 1883-85.

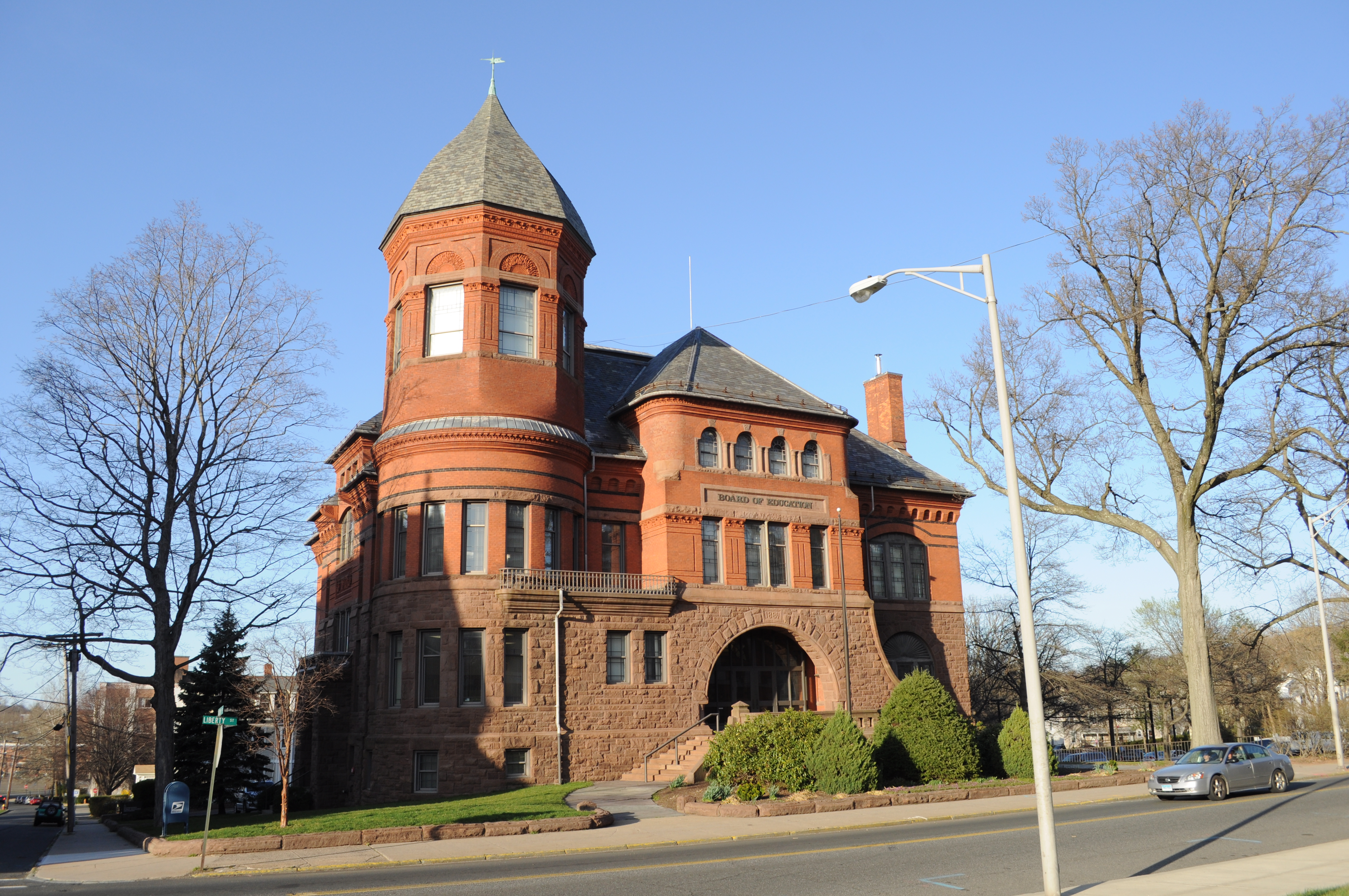
Meriden High School, Meriden, Connecticut, 1884-85.

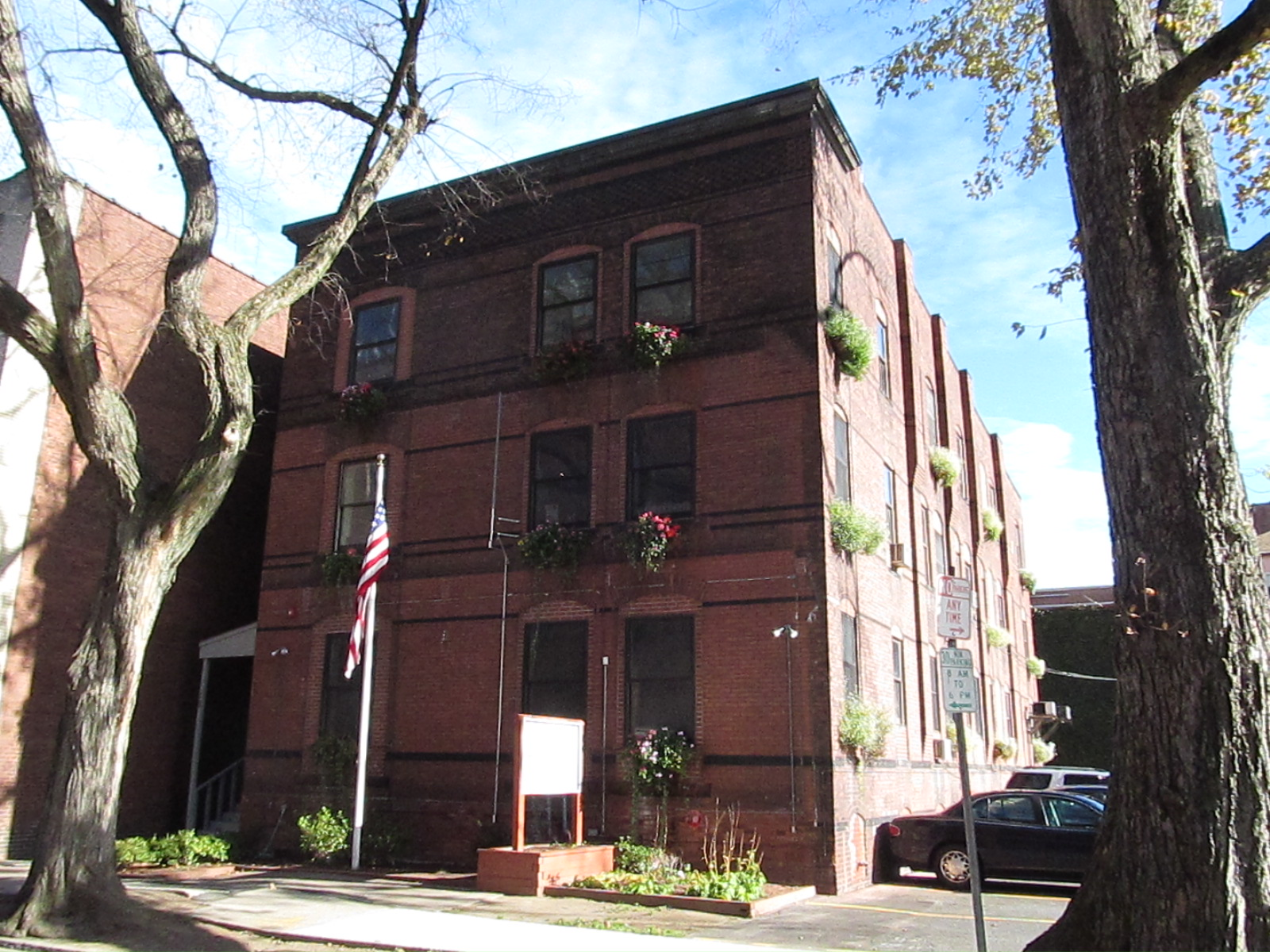
W C A Boarding House, Springfield, Massachusetts, 1884.

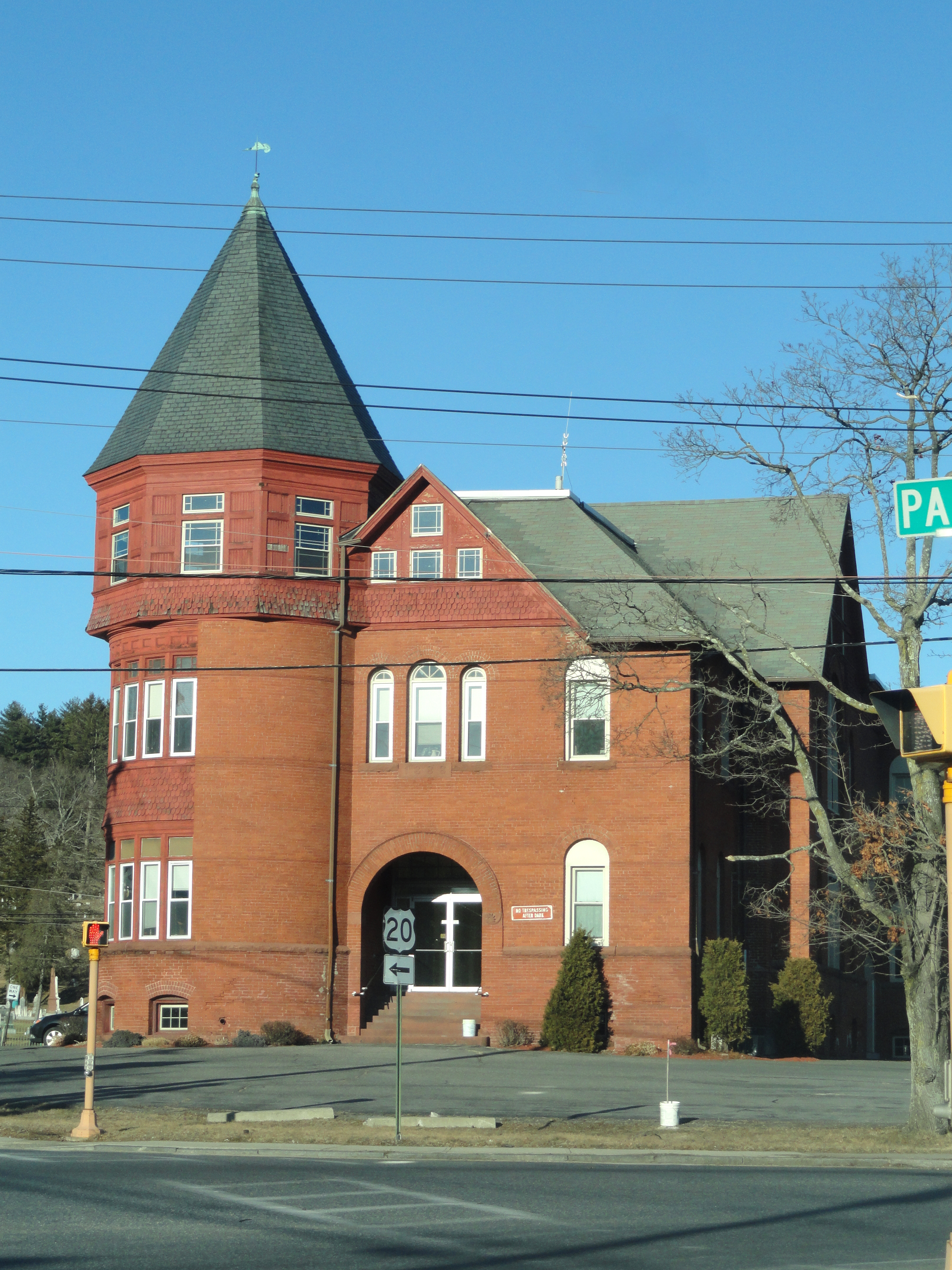
Palmer High School, Palmer, Massachusetts, 1888.

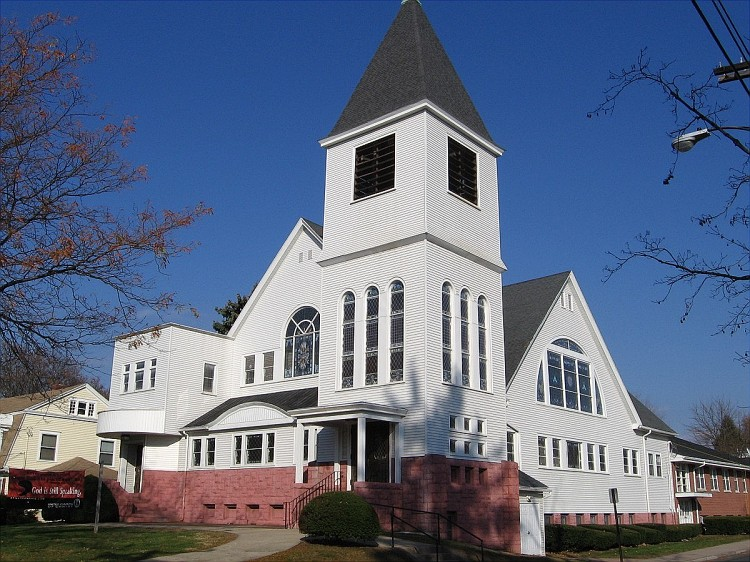
Second Congregational Church, Manchester, Connecticut, 1888-89.

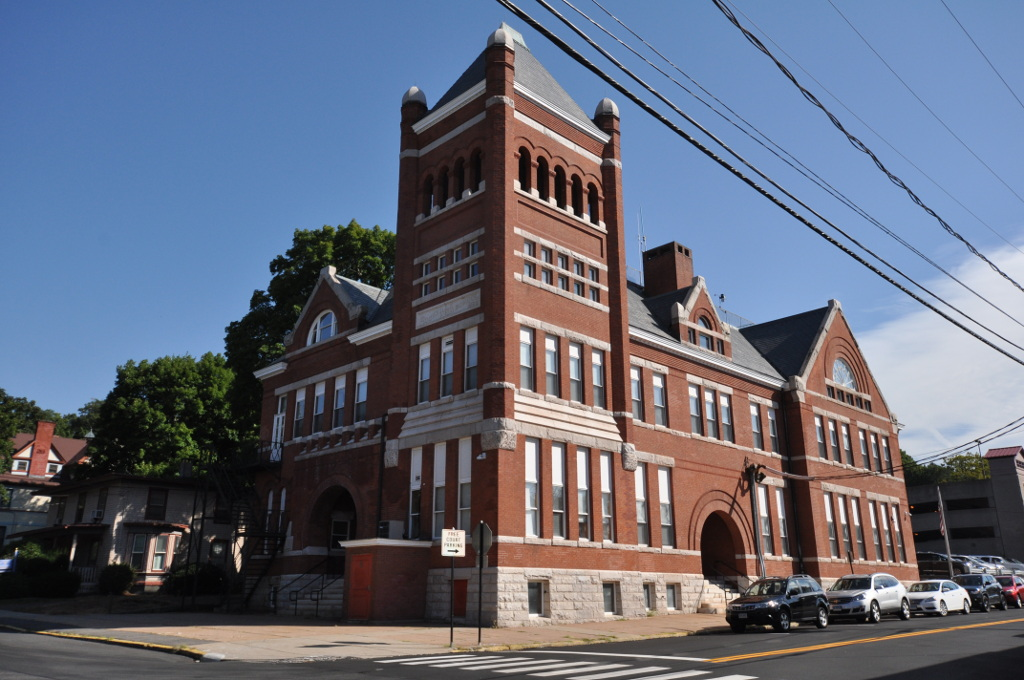
Rockville High School, Rockville, Connecticut, 1892.

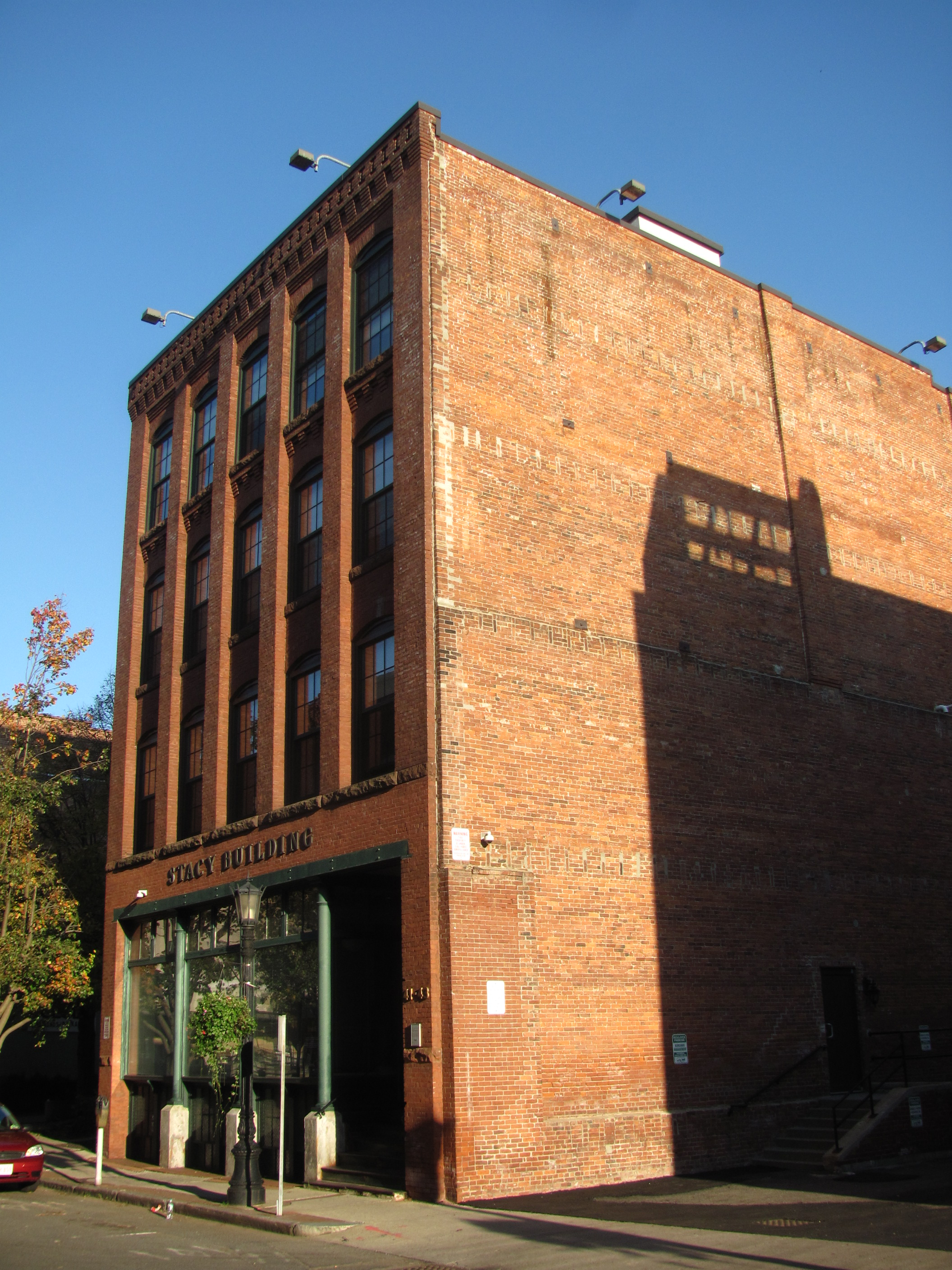
Stacy Building, Springfield, Massachusetts, 1893.

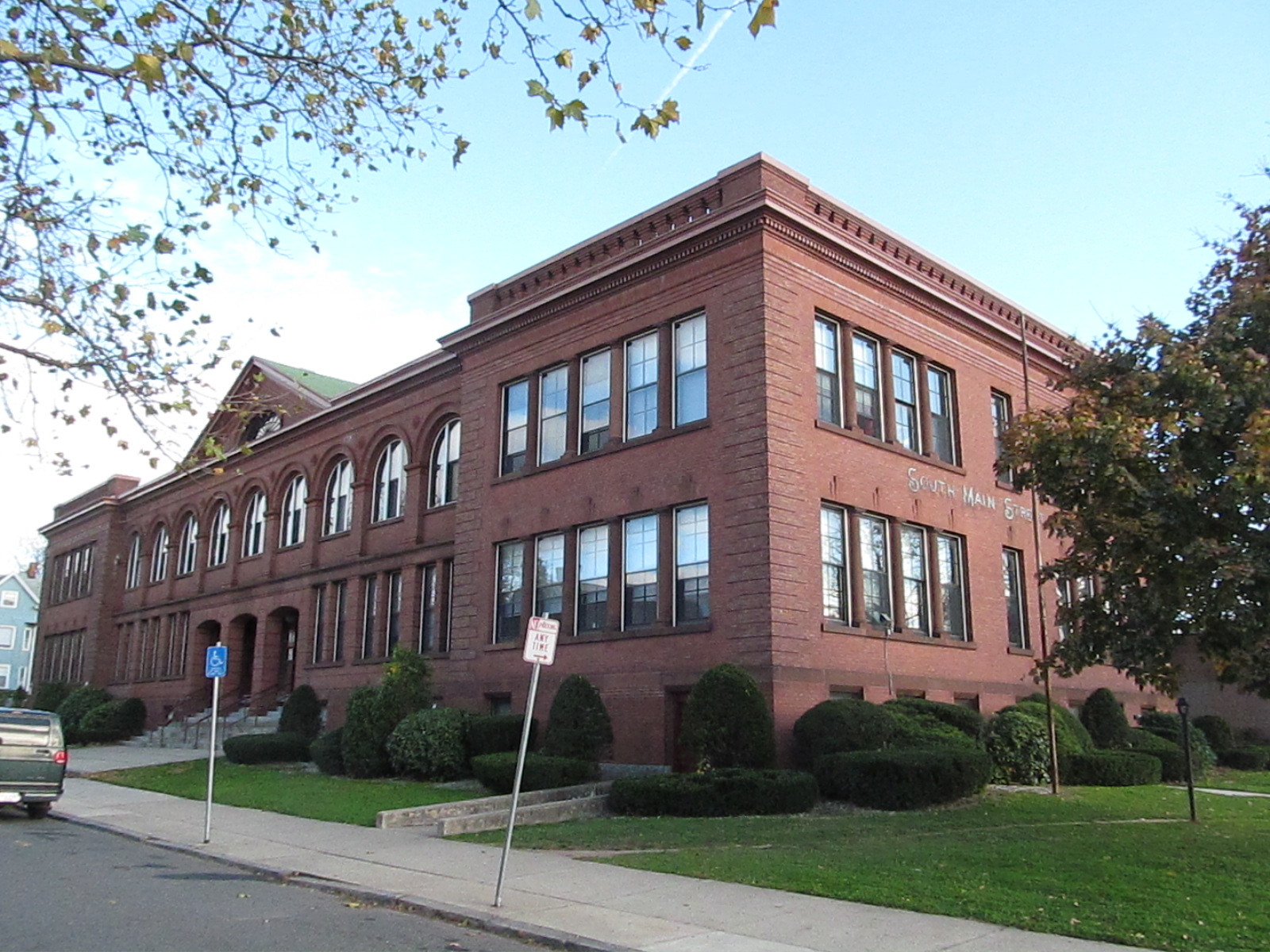
South Main Street School, Springfield, Massachusetts, 1895.

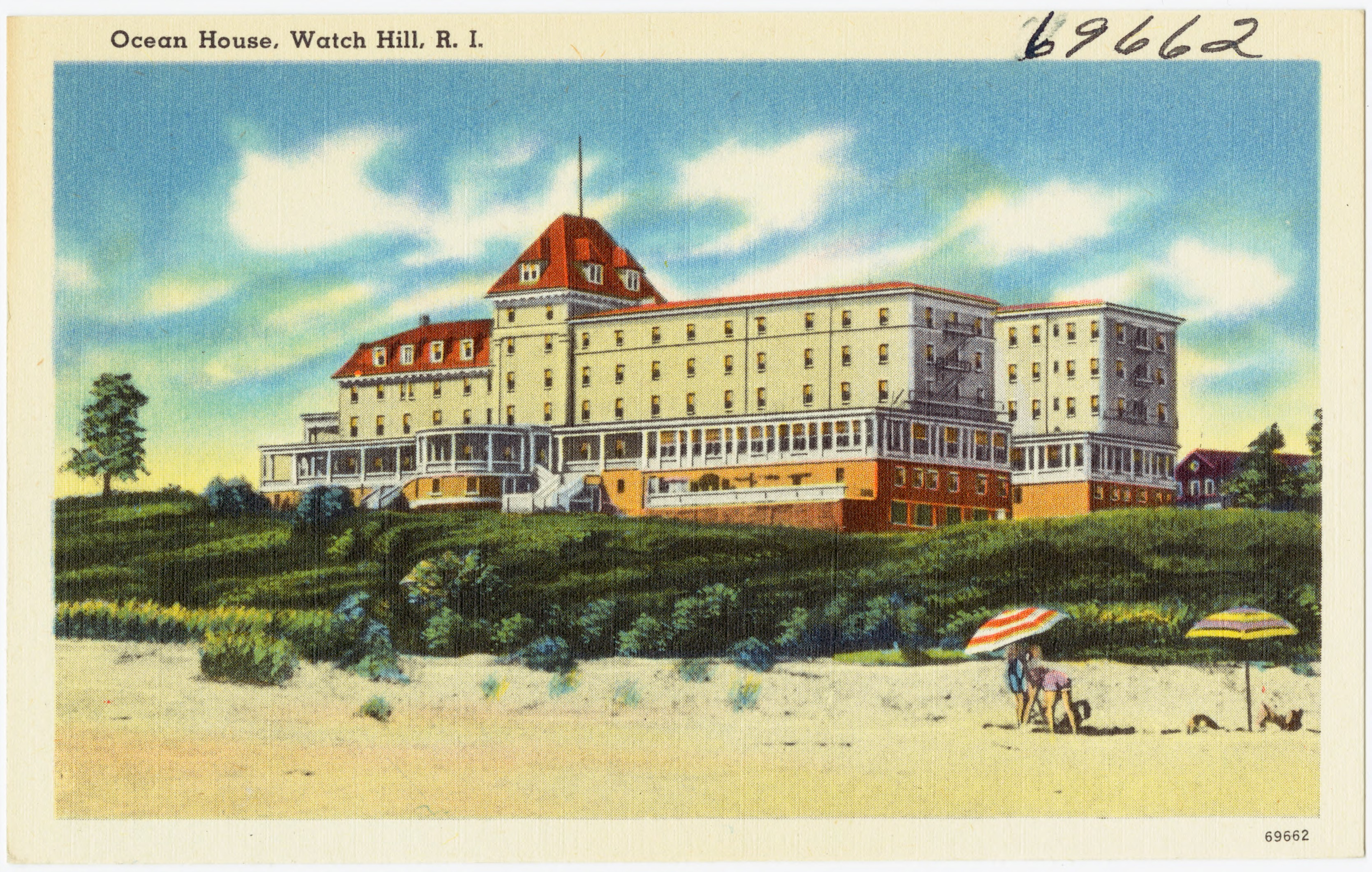
Additions to the Ocean House, Watch Hill, Rhode Island, 1897 and 1902.

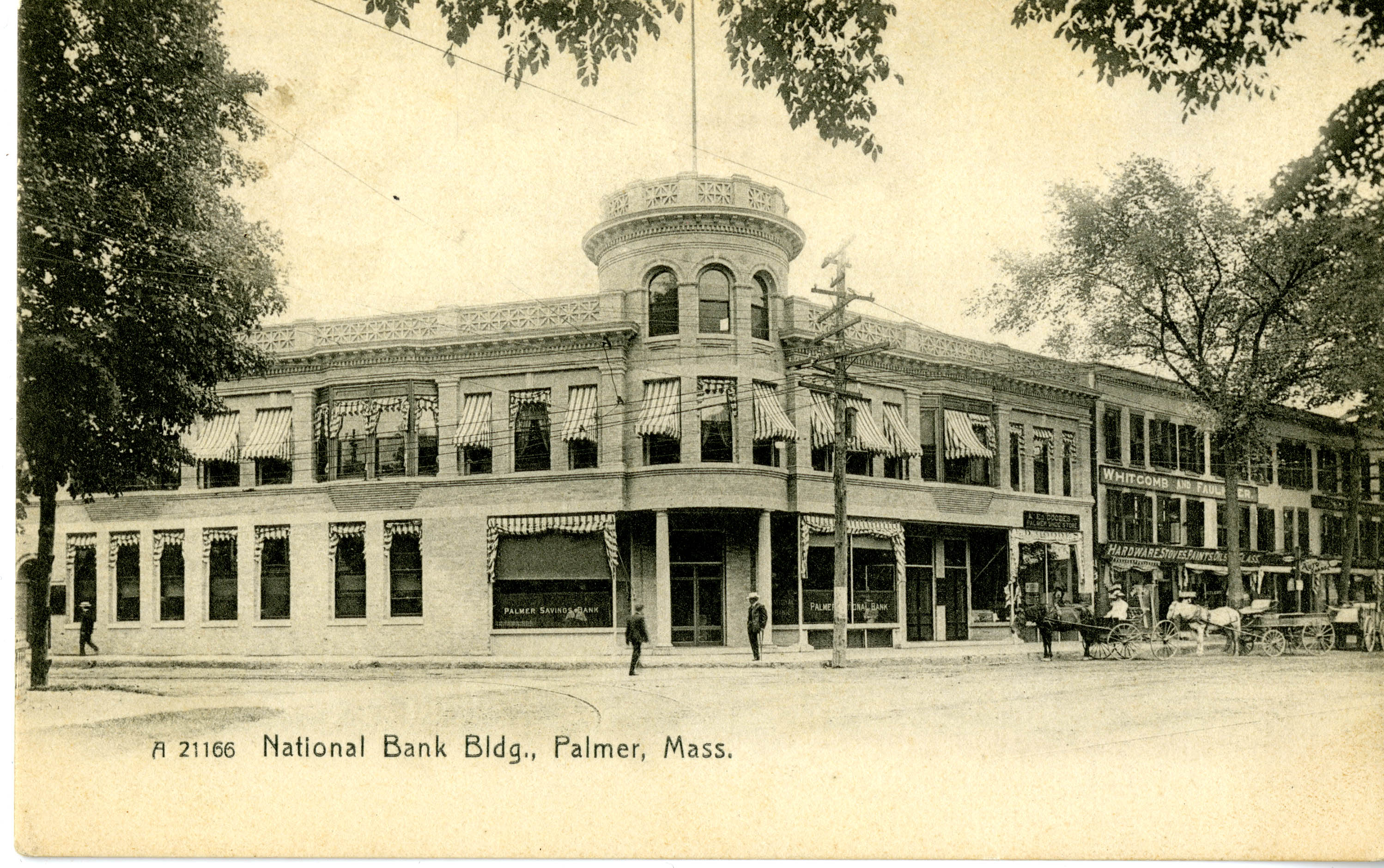
Palmer National and Savings Banks Building, Palmer, Massachusetts, 1904-05.
