= Bible Normal College =

The Bible Normal College of Hartford, Connecticut was a training school for Sunday school teachers. It started in 1885 as part of the School for Christian Workers in Springfield, Massachusetts; in 1889, it became the first American seminary to accept women. In 1897, it moved to Hartford, sharing the resources of the Hartford Seminary but remaining legally distinct.

Its name became the Hartford School of Religious Pedagogy and later The Hartford School of Religious Education and in 1913, federated itself with the Hartford Seminary and the Hartford School of Missions (later renamed the Kennedy School of Missions). The three schools, together with the Institute of Church and Community legally merged in 1961 to become the Hartford Seminary Foundation.
