= Chad Floyd =

American architect

John Paul Chadwick Floyd, usually credited as Chad Floyd, is an American architect (born November 11, 1944) and a founding partner of Centerbrook Architects & Planners of Essex, Connecticut. Floyd’s work consists of academic, arts, civic, and residential projects. He is a member of the College of Fellows of the American Institute of Architects and a fellow of the Institute of Urban Design.

== Education and early career ==
Floyd graduated from Yale College in 1966 and from the Yale School of Architecture in 1973. He received a Winchester Fellowship from Yale and a National Endowment for the Arts grant to study celebration spaces in 1974. He has been recognized for the use of interactive techniques, including live television, to engage citizens in urban design and in architecture.

== Centerbrook ==
Founded in 1975, Centerbrook grew out of a firm established by Charles W. Moore, formerly the Dean of the Yale School of Architecture. Centerbrook was named Firm of the Year by the American Institute of Architects in 1998.

== Notable projects ==
- Thompson Exhibition Building, Mystic Seaport Museum, Connecticut
- Eugene O'Neill Theater Center expansion, Connecticut
- Palmer Events Center, Texas
- Hood Museum of Art at Dartmouth, New Hampshire
- Addison Gallery of American Art, Phillips Academy Andover, New Hampshire
- Health Care REIT Headquarters, Ohio
- Krieble Gallery at Florence Griswold Museum, Connecticut
- Norton Museum of Art, Florida
- Tuck School of Business at Dartmouth College

== National recognition ==
- AIA Honor Award for Architecture, Hood Museum of Art, Dartmouth College, New Hampshire, 1987
- AIA Honor Award for Urban Architecture, Watkins Glen Waterfront Plan, New York, 1988
- AIA Honor Award for Architecture, Seneca Pier Pavilion, Watkins Glen, New York, 1989
- AIA Honor Award for Interiors, House in the Country, 1993
- Residential Architect Design Awards, Grand Award, Floyd House, Essex, Connecticut, 2006
- Architectural Digest, Top Architects, Adler House, 2008
