= Stacy Building =

- U.S. National Register of Historic Places
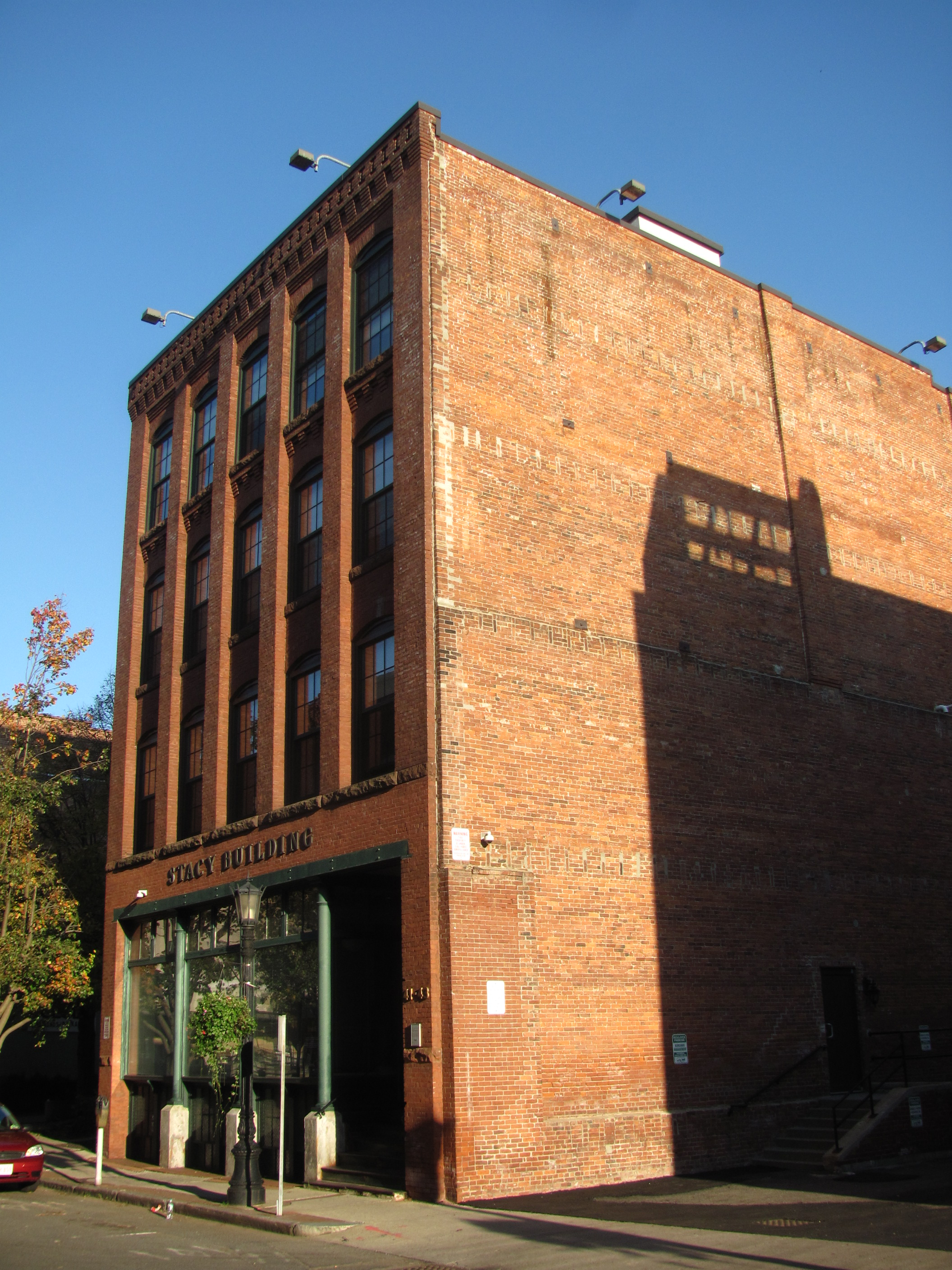
- Stacy Building

- Location within Massachusetts Location within the United States
- Location: Springfield, Massachusetts
- Coordinates: 42°6′17″N 72°35′35″W
- Built: 1893
- Architect: Francis R. Richmond
- MPS: Metro Center Springfield MRA
- NRHP reference No.: 83000768
- Added to NRHP: May 27, 1983

The Stacy Building is a historic building at 41-43 Taylor Street in Springfield, Massachusetts, in the district of Metro Center known as the Club Quarter. On September 20, 1893, Springfielders Charles and Frank Duryea road-tested the first-ever American-built, gasoline-powered car in Springfield, which they had built at the Stacy Building. The first Duryea Motor Wagons were all built by hand at the Stacy Building on Taylor Street in Springfield. Despite the September 20 road-test on Howard Bemis's Springfield farm, the Springfield Republican newspaper did get the story until the Duryea brothers' 2nd public road-test on November 10, 1893.

In 1895, the Duryea Motor Wagon won America's first-ever road race - a 54-mile race from Chicago to Evanston, Illinois, beating out European companies like Daimler Benz. Following this, demand for Duryea automobiles soared. In 1896, the Duryea Motor Wagon Company became the first company to manufacture and sell gasoline-powered automobiles. The Duryea Brothers produced thirteen cars by hand in the company's first year - all at the Stacy Building. The company's motto was "there is no better motorcar." Immediately, Duryeas were purchased by luminaries of the time, including George Vanderbilt. Two months after buying one of the first, manufactured cars - New York City motorist Henry Wells hit a bicyclist with his new Duryea; the rider suffered a broken leg, Wells spent a night in jail, and the United States' first traffic accident was recorded.

Outside of the Stacy Building - in what is now (as then) Springfield's Club Quarter - next to what is currently the popular Alumni Club at 90 Worthington Street, there is a model of an 1893 Duryea Motor Wagon - mere feet from the Stacy Building, where the Duryea Brothers invented and manufactured their history-changing machine.

== See also ==
- National Register of Historic Places listings in Springfield, Massachusetts
- National Register of Historic Places listings in Hampden County, Massachusetts
