= South Main Street School =

United States historic place and school building

- U.S. National Register of Historic Places
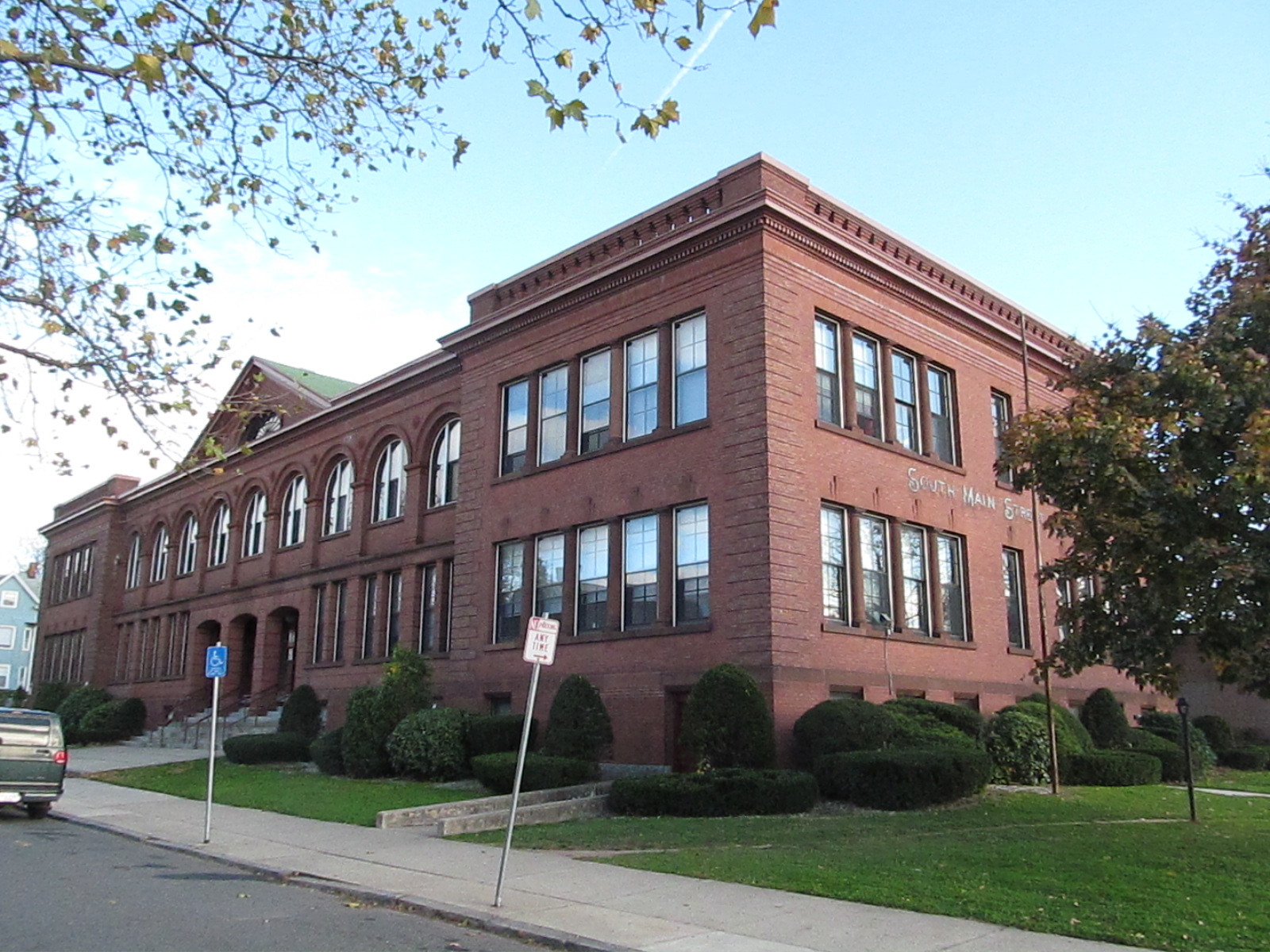
- South Main Street School

- Location within Massachusetts Location within the United States
- Location: 11 Acushnet Ave., Springfield, Massachusetts
- Coordinates: 42°5′31″N 72°34′46″W
- Area: 1 acre (0.40 ha)
- Built: 1895
- Architect: Francis R. Richmond
- Architectural style: Renaissance
- NRHP reference No.: 85000025
- Added to NRHP: January 3, 1985

The South Main Street School is an historic school building at 11 Acushnet Avenue in the South End of Springfield, Massachusetts, United States. Built in 1895, it is a good local example of Renaissance Revival architecture, and a major work of local architect Francis R. Richmond. It served as an elementary school into the 1970s, and has been converted to residential use. The building was listed on the National Register of Historic Places in 1985.

== Description and history ==
The South Main Street School is located about 1 mile (1.6 km) south of downtown Springfield, in its South End neighborhood at the southeast corner of South Main Street and Acushnet Avenue. It is a two-story brick building, covered by a broad hip roof with a center gable section. The main facade, facing Acushnet Avenue, has nine central bays flanked by classroom wings that have bands of five sash windows on each level. The central section has three entrance bays at its center, the entries recessed under segmented arches. The upper-floor bays have round-arch windows articulated by brick pilasters. Building corners have brick quoining, a dentillated cornice, and a low balustrade on the flanking end wings.

The school was constructed in 1895 in response to rising enrollments. It replaced a three-room schoolhouse, built c. 1840, that was nearby. The new school was built by contractors A.A. and S.T. Ball and was completed in 1897. The architect was Francis R. Richmond, who had designed several other school buildings for the city. The building served as an elementary school into the mid-1970s, and was briefly used for special education classes thereafter. It was finally vacated by the school system in 1982.

== See also ==
- National Register of Historic Places listings in Springfield, Massachusetts
- National Register of Historic Places listings in Hampden County, Massachusetts
