= W C A Boarding House =

Historic building in Massachusetts, U.S.

- U.S. National Register of Historic Places
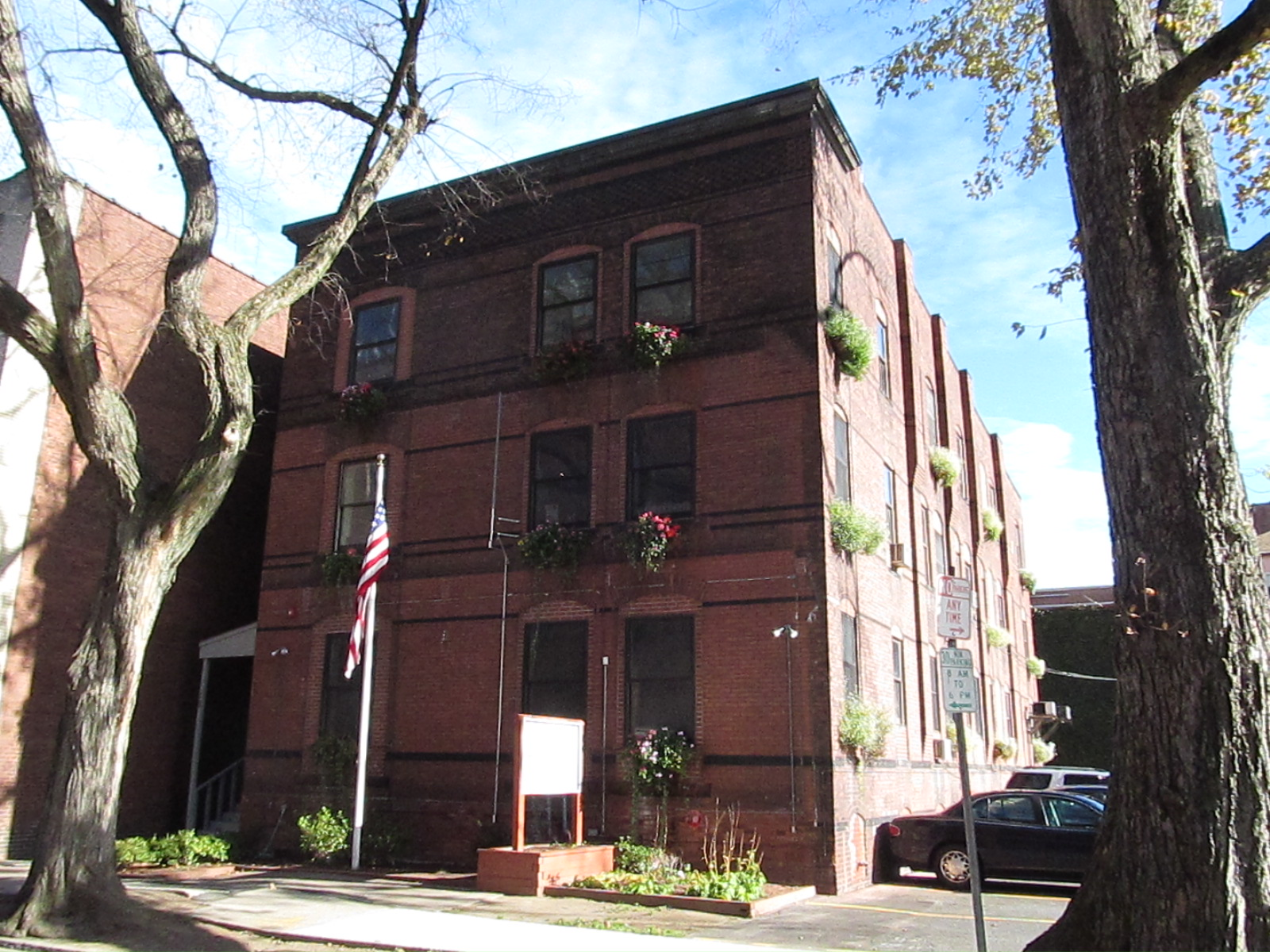
- W C A Boarding House, 2012

- Location within Massachusetts Location within the United States
- Location: 19 Bliss St., Springfield, Massachusetts
- Coordinates: 42°5′59″N 72°35′14″W
- Area: less than one acre
- Built: 1884
- Built by: C. H. Scott
- Architect: Richmond & Seabury
- Architectural style: Stick/Eastlake, Queen Anne
- MPS: Downtown Springfield MRA
- NRHP reference No.: 83000776
- Added to NRHP: February 24, 1983

The W C A Boarding House was a historic boarding house at 19 Bliss Street in Springfield, Massachusetts. Built in 1884 by the Women's Christian Association (WCA), it was one of Springfield's few surviving boarding house structures from the 19th century. The building was listed on the National Register of Historic Places in 1983. It was demolished to make way for the MGM Springfield casino.

== Description and history ==
The W C A Boarding House was located on the east side of Bliss Street, a right-of-way that formerly ran between Main Street and East Columbus Avenue, roughly dividing the area developed for the MGM casino. It was a three-story brick building with a flat roof. It was a stylistically restrained version of Queen Anne architecture, with some patterned brickwork and corbelled brick piers between the window bays. Windows were originally set in segmented-arch openings, and the building at one time sported a three-story Eastlake-style wooden porch.

The building was built in 1884 by the Women's Christian Association (WCA), a social welfare organization that was a predecessor to the Young Women's Christian Association. The architects were Richmond & Seabury, and the builder was C. H. Scott, both of Springfield.

The building was used by the WCA as a space for boarding respectable working-class single women. With the construction of a new facility in 1910, the property was operated as a private boarding house. From 1962 the building housed the Springfield Rescue Mission, a social welfare agency. It was demolished about 2012.

== See also ==
- National Register of Historic Places listings in Springfield, Massachusetts
- National Register of Historic Places listings in Hampden County, Massachusetts
