= Centerbrook Architects & Planners =

Centerbrook Architects & Planners is an American architecture firm founded in 1975 and based in Centerbrook, Connecticut. Centerbrook is one of 37 active firms nationwide to have won the Architecture Firm Award, annually bestowed by the American Institute of Architects.

== History ==
The forerunner to Centerbrook was Moore Grover Harper, named after partners Charles Moore, William H. Grover and Robert L. Harper. Moore, noted for his postmodern architectural designs, turned the firm over to Grover, Harper, Glenn Arbonies, Jeff Riley, Mark Simon and Chad Floyd. The firm changed its name to Centerbrook in 1984. Today Centerbrook has 60 employees and is led by principals Riley, Simon, Floyd, Jim Childress and Todd Andrews.

== Work ==
Centerbrook has designed built projects in 27 U.S. states, Canada and China. Its portfolio includes Rhode Island's Ocean House, one of only 13 triple Five Star resorts in the world; the Biomass Heating Facility at Hotchkiss School, named a Top 100 project by ArchDaily; and the Mystic Seaport Museum Thompson Exhibition Building, a Top 100 wood project in the U.S. by ArchDaily.

Selected Projects:
Ocean House, Rhode Island
Mystic Seaport Museum, Thompson Exhibition Building
Yale University, Kroon Hall, Yale School of Forestry & Environmental Studies
Jackson Laboratory for Genomic Medicine
Fairfield University Art Museum
Hotchkiss School Biomass Heating Facility
Quinnipiac University, People's United Center
Cold Spring Harbor Laboratory Hillside Research Campus
Addison Gallery of American Art, Phillips Academy Andover
Norton Museum of Art expansion
Adler Residence
Lakewood House
Essex, Connecticut residence
Museum & Archives, LancasterHistory
Casa Ambar, Cabo San Lucas

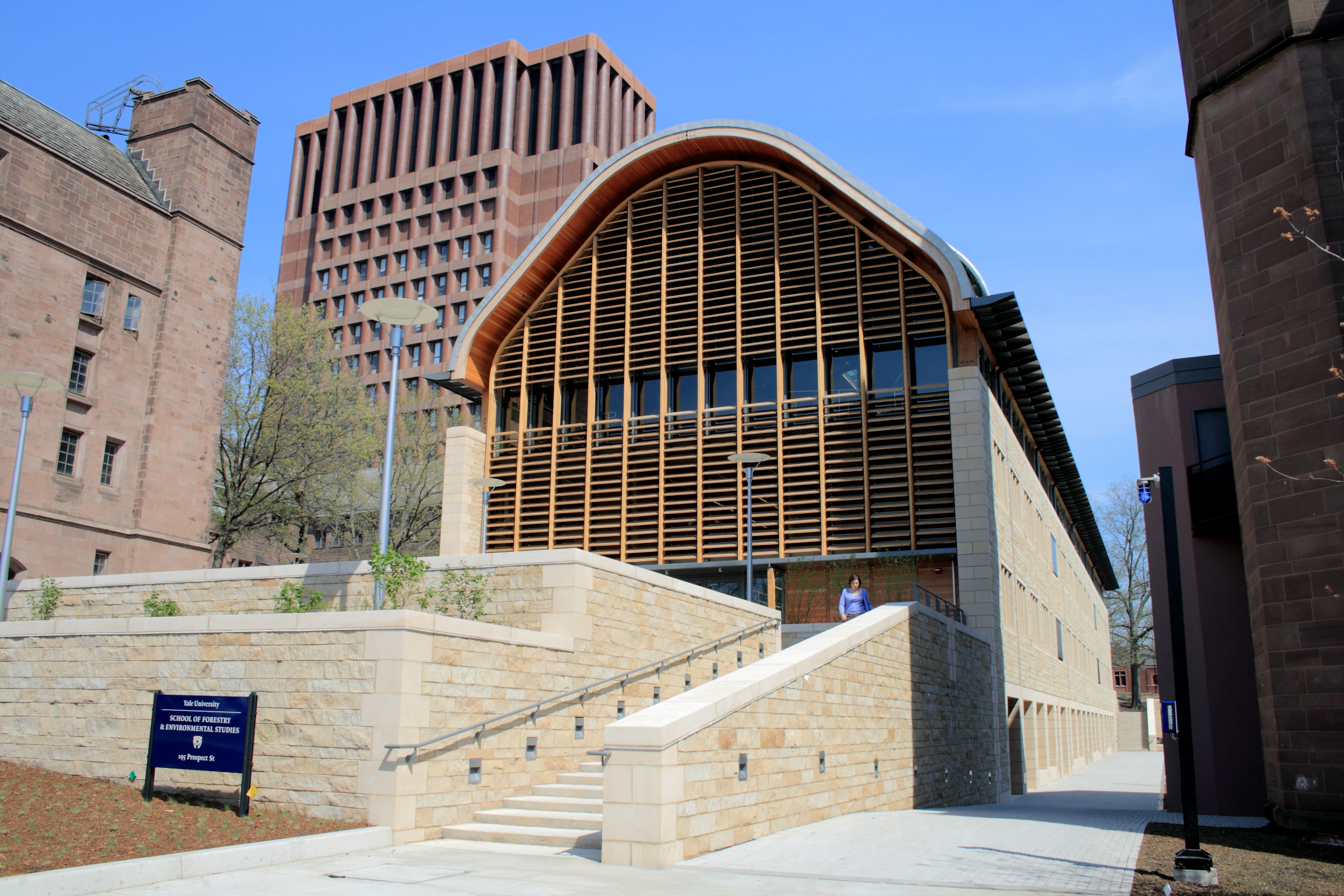
Yale University: Kroon Hall, School of Forestry & Environmental Studies

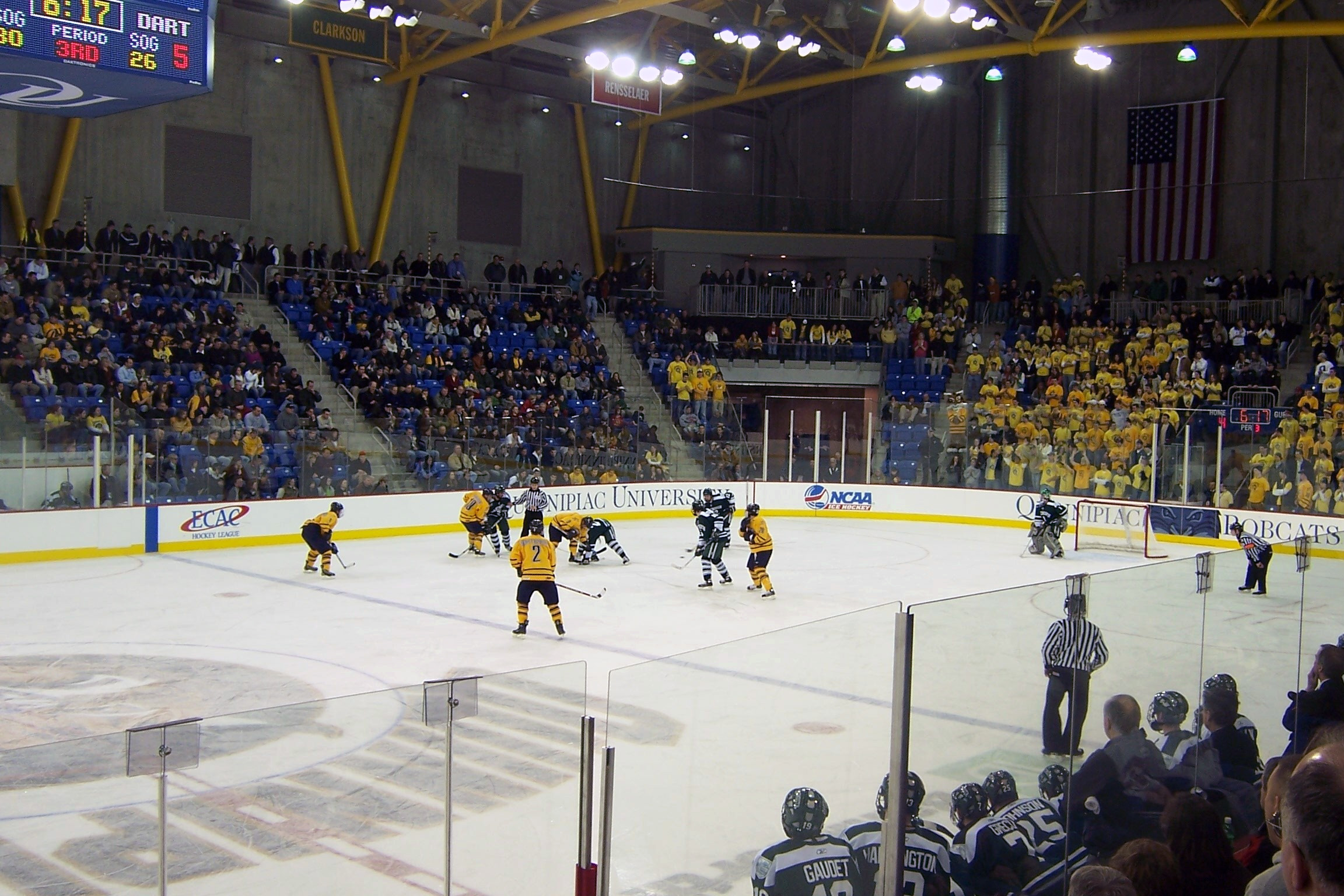
Quinnipiac University: People's United Center

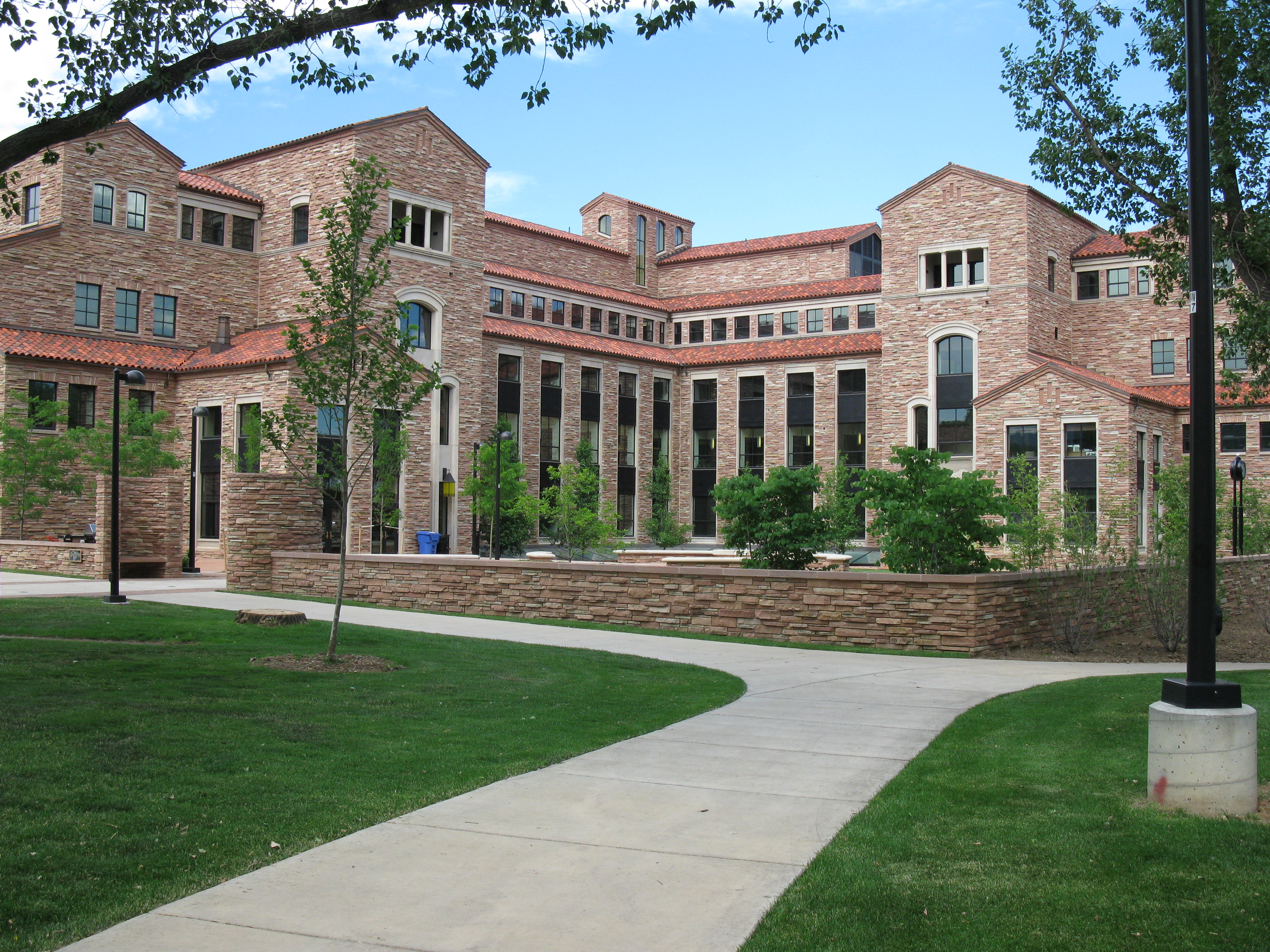
University of Colorado Boulder: Wolf School of Law Building

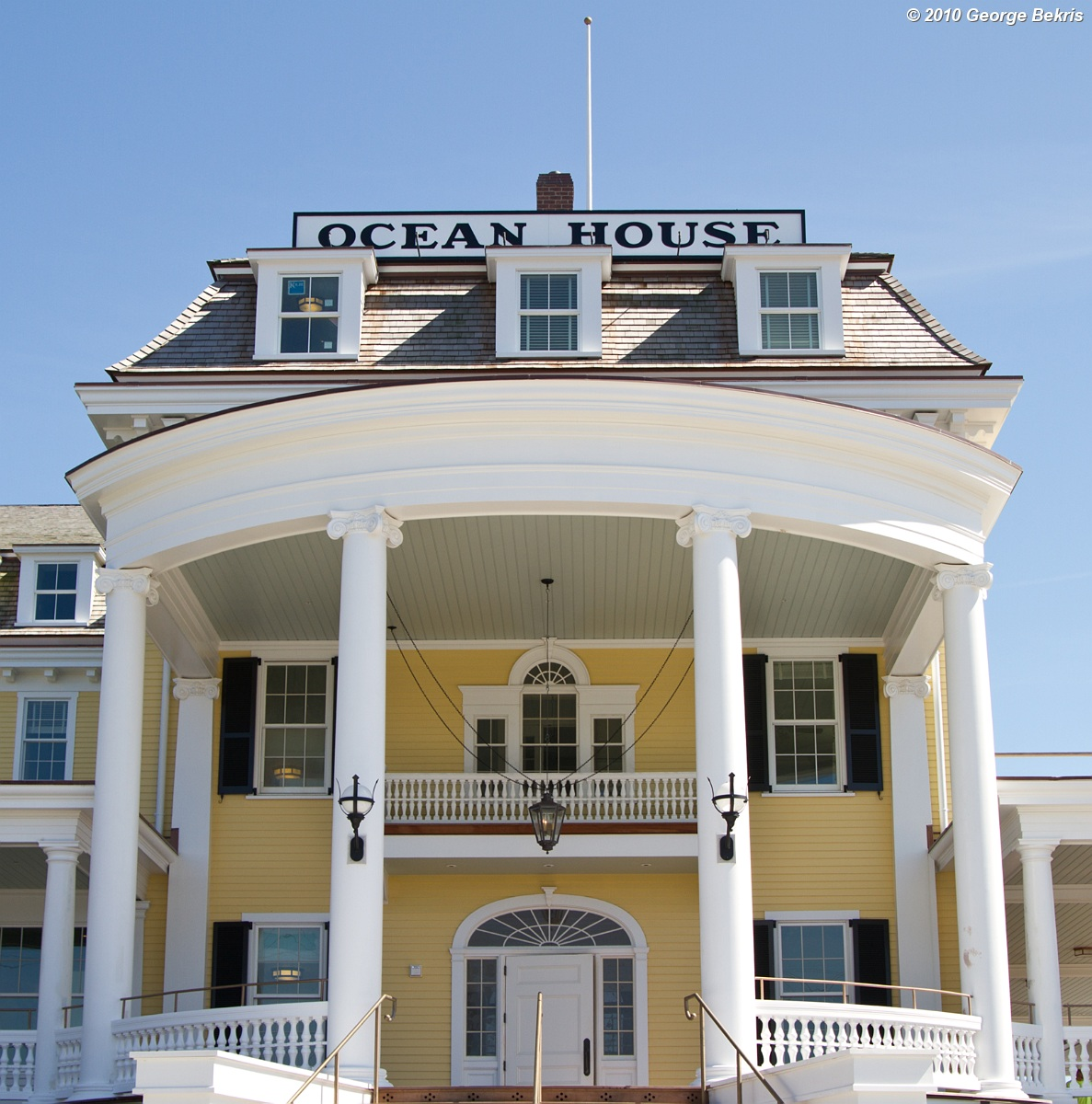
Ocean House

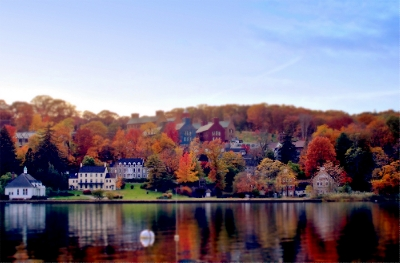
Cold Spring Harbor Laboratory

== Awards ==
In addition to the 1998 Architecture Firm Award, Centerbrook projects have earned more than 380 honors, including 149 from the American Institute of Architects (AIA). Centerbrook has earned 13 national and 25 regional AIA awards.
