= Old Rockville High School and East School =

- U.S. National Register of Historic Places
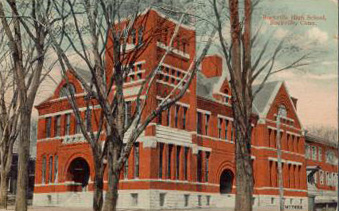
- Old Rockville High School

- Location within Connecticut Location within the United States
- Location: School and Park Streets, Rockville, Connecticut
- Coordinates: 41°52′08″N 72°26′52″W
- Area: 1.6 acres (0.65 ha)
- Built: 1870
- Architect: Francis R. Richmond
- Architectural style: Italianate, Romanesque Revival
- NRHP reference No.: 81000614
- Added to NRHP: April 27, 1981

The Old Rockville High School and East School are a pair of historic former school buildings at School and Park Streets in the Rockville section of Vernon, Connecticut. Built in 1892 and 1870 respectively, the two buildings are good examples of late 19th-century school architecture, and the former high school is a particularly good example of Richardsonian Romanesque design. The buildings were listed on the National Register of Historic Places in 1981. The high school now houses school administration offices, and the East School houses court offices.

== Description and history ==
The Old Rockville High School and East School are located in the commercial downtown area of Rockville, on the north side of School Street extending eastward from the junction with Park Street. The high school is located at the corner, while the East School is separated from that building by a parking lot and parking garage. The high school is an asymmetrical masonry structure, built mainly out of red brick with granite trim. It exhibits most of the elements typical of Richardsonian Romanesque architecture, including large round-arch openings, bands of windows headed by stone lintels, and a four-story pyramidal tower. The East School is also of brick construction, but is considerably more plain, with a paired brackets in its gabled eaves, and a portico supported by paneled posts rising to rounded arches.

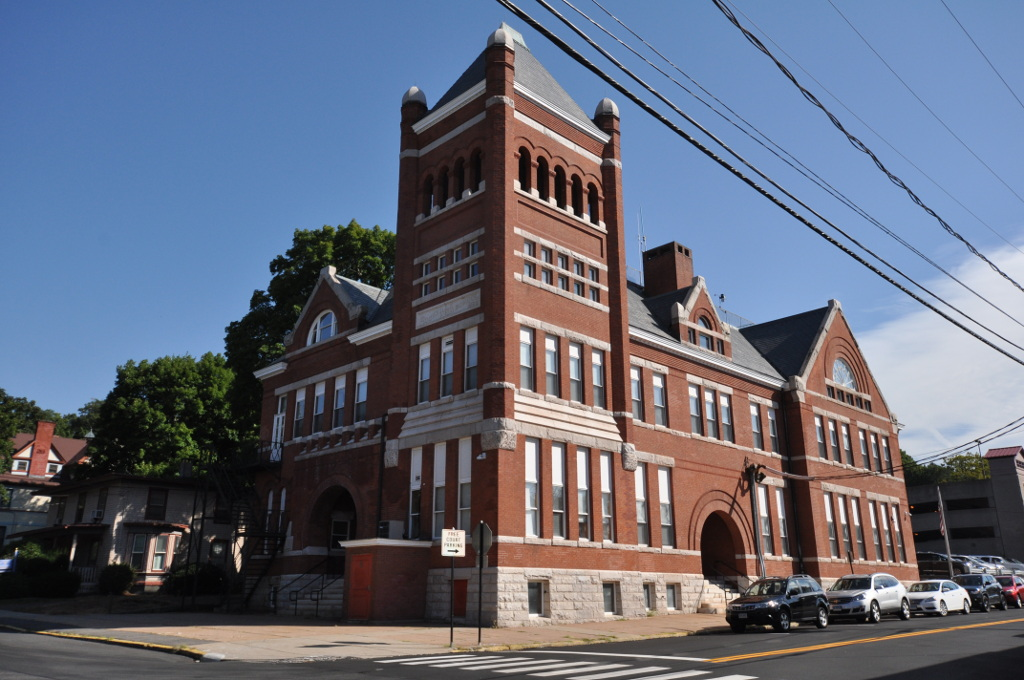
The old high school in 2016

The East School was built in 1870, during a period of rapid growth in Rockville caused by the post-Civil War economic boom, and was designed to relieve crowding pressure on smaller district schools. The high school was built in 1892, to a design by Francis Richmond of Springfield, Massachusetts. The era in which it was built also coincided with Rockville's continuing economic prosperity, and was built to provide a higher level of education called for by the area's employers. Although it was state of the art at the time of its construction, it served the town as a high school only until 1924, and now houses school administrative offices.

== See also ==
- National Register of Historic Places listings in Tolland County, Connecticut
