= School for Christian Workers =

School in Springfield, Massachusetts, US

The School for Christian Workers was a school established by Rev. David Allen Reed in Springfield, Massachusetts, United States, in 1885 to prepare young men for work as Sunday school superintendents, secretaries of Young Men's Christian Associations, pastors, lay assistants, Bible colporteurs, and lay home mission workers.

The school was organized as four departments: a school for YMCA administrators, a French Protestant school, a technical school, and a school for religious pedagogy; by 1890, each department split off into an independent institution.

The YMCA departments, Secretarial (YMCA management) and Physical (physical education), split off to become the International Young Men's Christian Association Training School in 1890 which later became Springfield College.

The religious education part took the name Bible Normal College in 1897, and relocated to Hartford Seminary. The two institutions remained legally separate, but shared resources until their final merger in 1961.

The technical school became the Christian Industrial and Technical School in 1890; it trained future missionaries in carpentry, blacksmithing, foundry work, typesetting, and bookbinding; it was renamed to the Springfield Industrial Institute in 1895 and closed in 1898.
