= Springfield Industrial Institute =

Defunct school in Massachusetts, USA

The Springfield Industrial Institute in Winchester Park, Springfield, Massachusetts trained future missionaries in carpentry, blacksmithing, foundry work, typesetting, and bookbinding. It was founded in 1887 by Daniel B. Wesson as an outgrowth of the School for Christian Workers; it was originally named the New England Industrial and Technological School, and changed its name in 1890 to the Christian Industrial and Technical School.

The school had a relationship with the Elektron Manufacturing Company.

It changed its name to the Springfield Industrial Institute in 1895.

It was discontinued in 1898, and its building was leased by the Mechanic Arts High School (Springfield, Massachusetts) (later called the Technical High School) until it built its own building.
