= Ocean House, Rhode Island =

Hotel in Westerly, RI

Ocean House
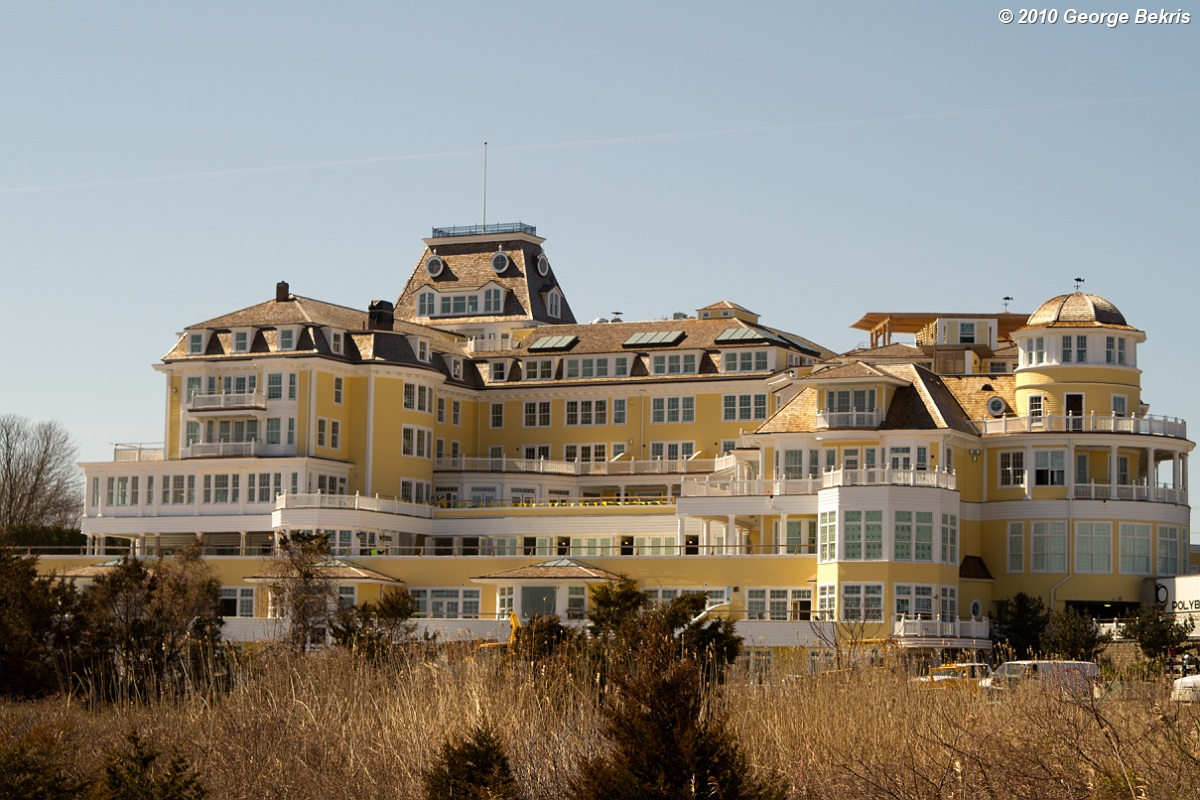
- Interactive map of the Ocean House area

General information
- Location: 1 Bluff Avenue; Watch Hill, RI 02891
- Coordinates: 41°18′37.3″N 71°51′13.2″W

Technical details
- Floor area: 152,165 square feet (14,136.6 m^{2})

Design and construction
- Architects: Centerbrook Architects & Planners (2010 Redevelopment)
- Developer: Charles M. Royce (2010 Redevelopment)

Website
- http://www.oceanhouseri.com/

Ocean House is a large, Victorian-style waterfront hotel originally constructed in 1868 on Bluff Avenue in Watch Hill, Rhode Island. The original 1868 hotel closed in 2003; it was demolished in 2005 and a new facility opened in 2010 on the same site which retained much of the original structure's form and appearance, as well as the original name. Both the original and its reconstruction are noted for their rambling Victorian architecture and distinctive yellow siding.

The original Ocean House was the last waterfront Victorian-era hotel on mainland Rhode Island.

== History ==
The original Ocean House was built in 1868. It was smaller than the other hotels located in Watch Hill, but it expanded with numerous additions over the years.

In March, 2004, Girouard Associates of New Canaan, Connecticut purchased the facility from heirs of the Louis D. Miller family, which had owned the hotel since 1938. Girouard Associates intended to raze Ocean House and build five large oceanfront homes, but a protest ensued. A new buyer was ultimately found, and the spirit of the original building was preserved even though the actual building was not.

The motion picture American Aristocracy starring Douglas Fairbanks was filmed at the Ocean House in 1916.

== Closing, protest, and demolition ==
Factors related to the closing of the original Ocean House included its lack of modern amenities, its dilapidated condition, and its non-compliance with current building codes. The original Ocean House operated seasonally, open roughly three months a year, and the building lacked a heating, air conditioning, and ventilation system. In the last years of its operation, the top two floors were unused and only 59 rooms were serviceable out of its original 159. The aging facility lacked requisite amenities, service functions, egress requirements, handicapped accessibility requirements, and parking to meet modern codes. A newspaper article described its final condition: "Grand staircases lead nowhere. Rainwater seeps through the walls and runs down wired-in-place gutters. The oak elevator is broken."

The 138 year-old building was not compliant with current building and life safety codes. Its timber structure had been compromised by indiscriminate installation of electric, gas, and plumbing utilities, as well as a reconfiguration of rooms to include private bathrooms. Rhode Island's fire codes were revised and more rigorously enforced after the 2003 Station nightclub fire, rendering the deficiencies insurmountable at Ocean House. Current life-safety standards required installation of interior structural shear walls, new hurricane-rated windows with new frames, a new concrete foundation with steel tie-downs throughout, stripping off all interior and exterior lead paint, and removal of interior mold requiring demolition of interior finishes.

In 2004, the Ocean House was not permitted to open because of code deficiencies; the original hotel ceased operations in 2003 and was sold. The community learned in March 2004 that a developer from out of town planned to raze Ocean House and build five homes in its place, so organizers began a campaign to save the building and preserve the site's public oceanfront access and beach. These organizers included representatives from Preserve Rhode Island, Rhode Island Historical Preservation, and Heritage Commission, as well as the National Trust. Another buyer was found who deemed it economically and physically unfeasible to make the building functional and code compliant, but he promised to rebuild it from the ground up. The original building was demolished and a new facility constructed on site.

== Reconstruction ==
Project architects met resistance with the demolition of Ocean House, but they successfully argued for reconstruction. They suggested a building modeled after the original Ocean House as it was at its zenith, around 1908. This would permit a 49-room hotel appropriate in scale to its adjacent streets, while expanding toward the beach where 23 condominiums could be accommodated. It also would enable it to have the amenities and service functions that could make the project functionally and economically feasible.

The original Ocean House structure was demolished in December 2005 and the subsequent facility opened in 2010.

The new design by Centerbrook Architects is 50,000 square feet larger than the original at 156,000 square feet. It reconstructs much of the original massing and restores certain original details that had been removed during the ongoing operation of the facility, such as the original mansard roof and lobby fireplace. It also incorporates new elements, including subterranean facilities and two new wings extending from the main building, which also shield neighboring residential areas from hotel activities.

The original facility was documented and overall dimensions and heights were preserved, including the size and location of windows. Actual pieces of the original building were salvaged and the design replicates columns, capitals, and woodwork. Materials within human reach are wood, while detailing which is out of reach is made of synthetic materials that are more easy to maintain.

The new facility features 49 guest rooms and 23 residential condominium suites, as well as meeting rooms, spa, lap pool, fitness center, and restaurants. The design also accommodates service functions requisite to a modern facility: up to date kitchens, loading docks, mechanical rooms, fire egress requirements (e.g., redundant stairs), and staff facilities.

== Gallery ==
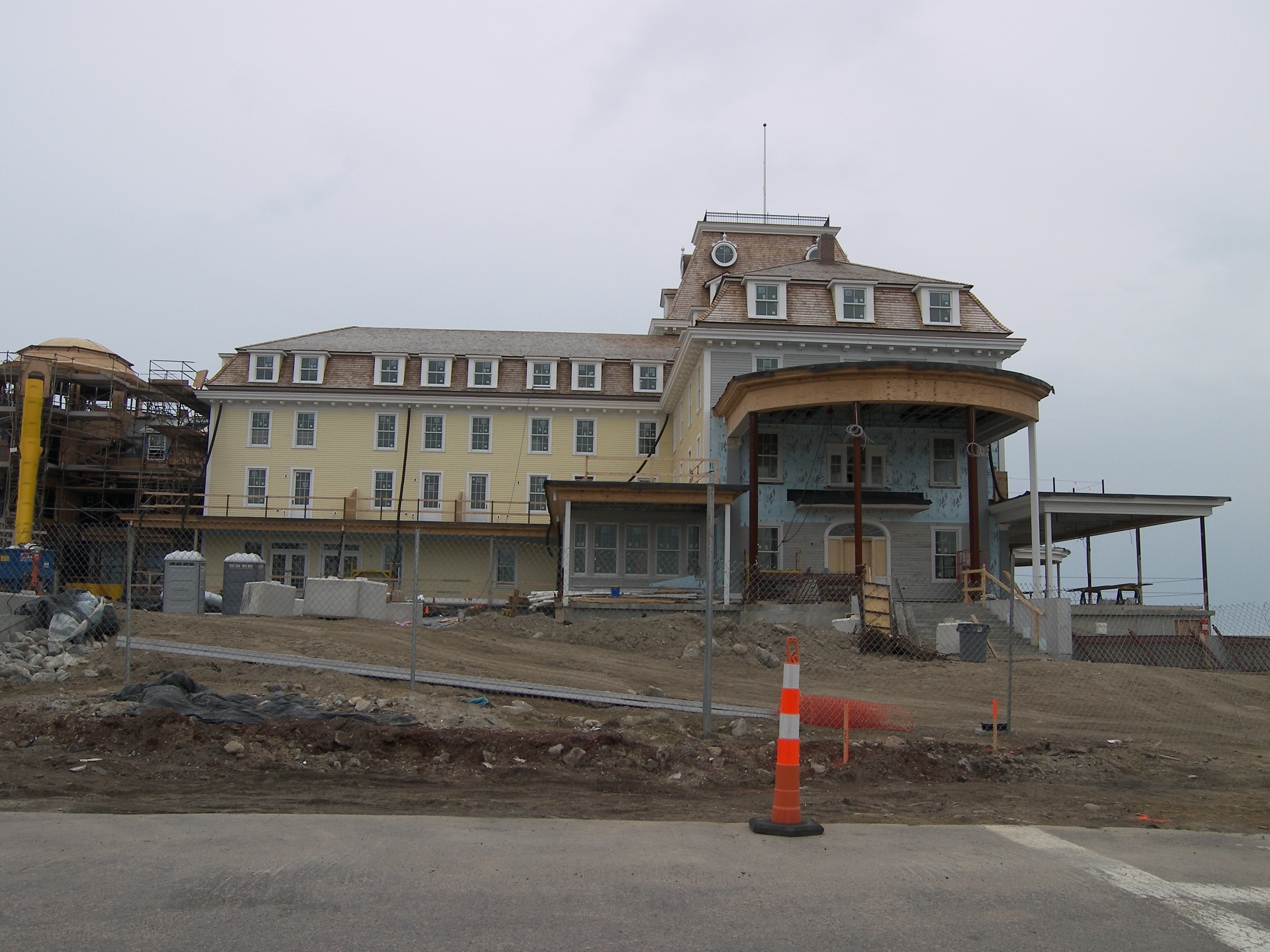
The New Ocean House progress in May 2009

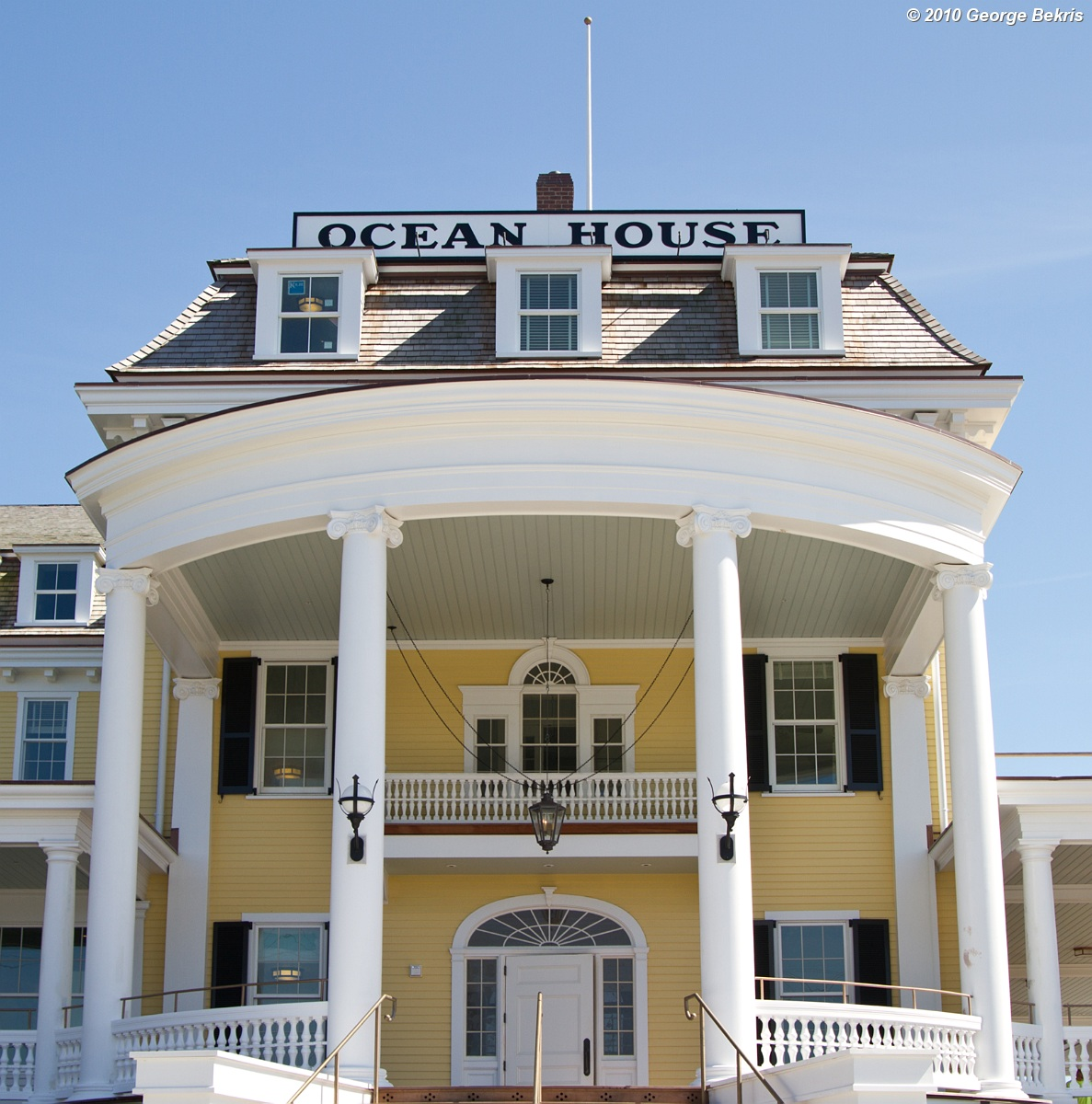
April 2010

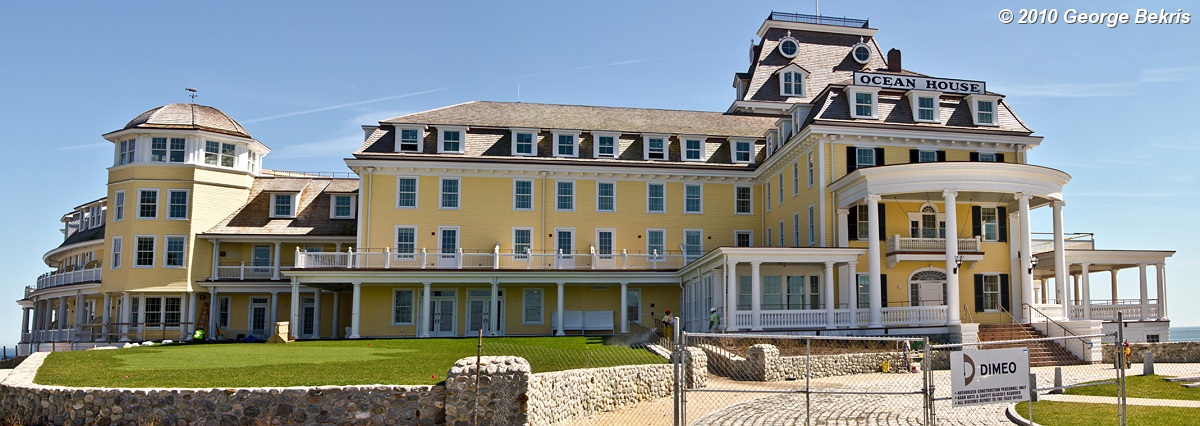
April 2010

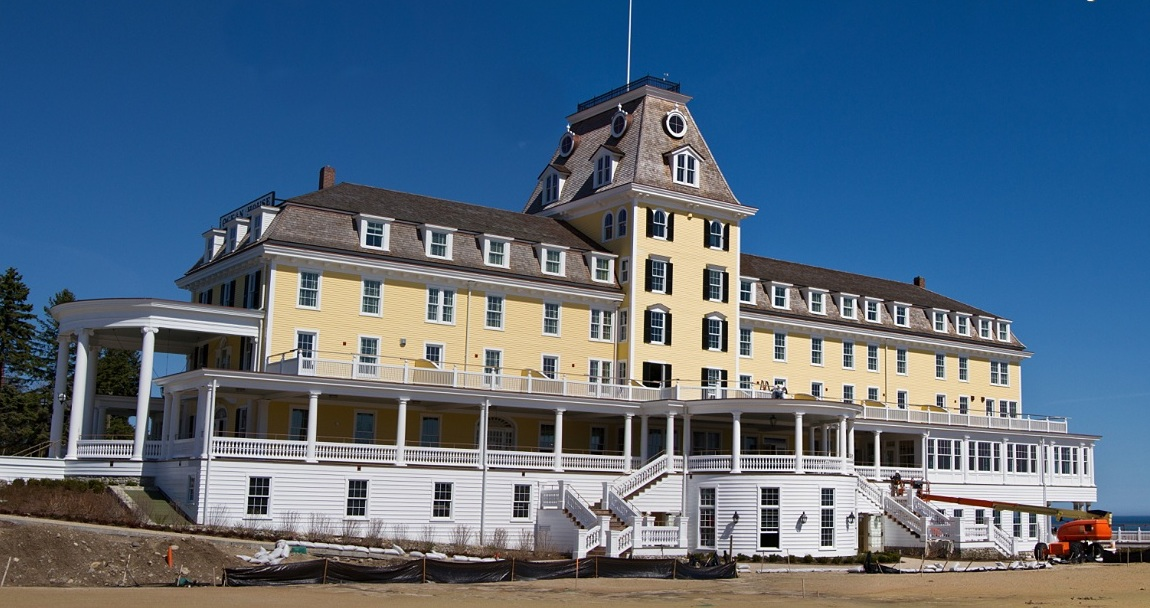
April 2010
