= 2026 United States state auditor elections =

- November 3, 2026

23 state auditor offices (Note: Seat tallies and popular vote do not include states that do not elect state auditors or territorial state auditors.)
	Majority party	Minority party
Party	Republican	Democratic
Seats before	19	13
Seats after	18	14
Seat change	▼1	▲1
Seats up	11	12
Seats won	10	13
- Democratic hold Democratic gain Republican hold Republican gain No election

The 2026 United States state auditor elections were held on November 3, 2026, to elect the state auditor of twenty-three U.S. states. The previous elections for this group of states took place in 2022, except in Vermont, whose auditor serves two-year terms and was elected in 2024.

These elections will take place concurrently with various other federal, state, and local elections.

== Partisan composition ==
Going into these elections, this class of state auditors is made up of 12 Democrats and 11 Republicans. There are two states that were won by Donald Trump in 2024 with Democratic auditors, Iowa at R+13.2 and South Carolina at R+17.8, while Republicans do not serve as auditors in any states won by Kamala Harris.

== Retirements ==
Map of retirements: Republican incumbent ran Democratic incumbent ran Republican incumbent term-limited Democratic incumbent retired No election

There are eight incumbent state auditors (five Democrats and three Republicans) retiring, of which three incumbent state auditors (three Republicans) are term-limited. The remaining five incumbent state auditors (five Democrats) have announced they are not seeking reelection.

=== Democratic ===
1. Illinois: Susana Mendoza is retiring.
2. Iowa: Rob Sand is retiring to run for governor.
3. Minnesota: Julie Blaha is retiring.
4. South Carolina: Brian J. Gaines is retiring.
5. Vermont: Doug Hoffer is retiring.

=== Republican ===
1. Ohio: Keith Faber is term-limited after 2 terms.
2. Oklahoma: Cindy Byrd is term-limited after 2 terms.
3. South Dakota: Rich Sattgast is term-limited after 2 terms.

== Race summary ==
State	Auditor	Party	First elected	Last race	Status	Candidates
Alabama	Andrew Sorrell	Republican	2022	85.0% R	Incumbent re-elected.	▌ ✓ Andrew Sorrell (Republican); ▌Violet Edwards (Democratic)
Arkansas	Dennis Milligan	Republican	2022	66.8% R	Incumbent re-elected.	▌ ✓ Dennis Milligan (Republican)
California	Malia Cohen	Democratic	2022	55.4% D	Incumbent re-elected.	▌ ✓ Malia Cohen (Democratic); ▌Herb Morgan (Republican)
Connecticut	Sean Scanlon	Democratic	2022	55.1% D	Incumbent re-elected.	▌ ✓ Sean Scanlon (Democratic); ▌Jen Tooker (Republican)
Delaware	Lydia York	Democratic	2022	54.2% D	Incumbent re-elected.	▌ ✓ Lydia York (Democratic); ▌April Callaway (Republican); ▌Austin Cassidy (Independent Party)
Idaho	Brandon Woolf	Republican	2012 (appointed)	69.5% R	Incumbent re-elected.	▌ ✓ Brandon Woolf (Republican); ▌Rakesh Mohan (Democratic)
Illinois	Susana Mendoza	Democratic	2016 (special)	57.1% D	Incumbent retired. Democratic hold.	▌ ✓ Margaret Croke (Democratic); ▌Bryan Drew (Republican)
Indiana	Elise Nieshalla	Republican	2023 (appointed)	60.1% R	Incumbent lost re-election. Democratic gain.	▌ ✓ Jessica Bailey (Democratic); ▌Elise Nieshalla (Republican); ▌John Schick (Libertarian)
Iowa	Rob Sand	Democratic	2018	50.1% D	Incumbent retired to run for governor. Democratic hold.	▌ ✓ Taylor Wettach (Democratic); ▌Chris Cournoyer (Republican)
Maryland	Brooke Lierman	Democratic	2022	61.6% D	Incumbent re-elected.	▌ ✓ Brooke Lierman (Democratic); ▌Sonya Dunn (Republican)
Massachusetts	Diana DiZoglio	Democratic	2022	54.9% D	Incumbent re-elected.	▌ ✓ Diana DiZoglio (Democratic); ▌Al Ozonoff (Libertarian)
Minnesota	Julie Blaha	DFL	2018	47.5% DFL	Incumbent retired. Democratic hold.	▌ ✓ Zack Filipovich (DFL); ▌Scott Jensen (Republican); ▌Jay Reeves (Forward Independence)
Missouri	Scott Fitzpatrick	Republican	2022	59.4% R	Incumbent re-elected.	▌ ✓ Scott Fitzpatrick (Republican); ▌Quentin Wilson (Democratic); ▌Dustin Coffell (Libertarian)
Nebraska	Mike Foley	Republican	2022	68.5% R	Incumbent re-elected.	▌ ✓ Mike Foley (Republican); ▌John Knight (America First)
Nevada	Andy Matthews	Republican	2022	50.1% R	Incumbent lost re-election. Democratic gain.	▌ ✓ Michael MacDougall (Democratic); ▌Andy Matthews (Republican)
New Mexico	Joseph Maestas	Democratic	2022	61.9% D	Incumbent re-elected.	▌ ✓ Joseph Maestas (Democratic); ▌Joshua Lawrence (Republican)
New York	Tom DiNapoli	Democratic	2007 (appointed)	57.3% D	Incumbent re-elected.	▌ ✓ Tom DiNapoli (Democratic); ▌Joseph Hernandez (Republican)
Ohio	Keith Faber	Republican	2018	58.7% R	Incumbent term-limited. Republican hold.	▌ ✓ Frank LaRose (Republican); ▌Annette Blackwell (Democratic)
Oklahoma	Cindy Byrd	Republican	2018	100% R (Note: Byrd ran unopposed in 2022)	Incumbent term-limited. Republican hold.	▌ ✓ Melissa Capps (Republican)
South Carolina	Brian J. Gaines	Democratic	2023 (appointed)	98.2% R (Note: Eckstrom, Gaines's predecessor, was re-elected against write-in opposition in 2022)	Incumbent retired. Republican gain.	▌ ✓ Mike Burkhold (Republican); ▌Tiffany Boozer (Democratic)
South Dakota	Rich Sattgast	Republican	2018	62.7% R	Incumbent term-limited. Republican hold.	▌ ✓ Catherine Barranco (Republican); ▌Tom Cool (Democratic)
Vermont	Doug Hoffer	Democratic	2012	60.6% D/P	Incumbent retired. Democratic hold.	▌ ✓ Tim Ashe (Democratic); ▌Ivar Kronick (Republican)
Wyoming	Kristi Racines	Republican	2018	100% R (Note: Racines ran unopposed in 2022)	Incumbent re-elected.	▌ ✓ Kristi Racines (Republican)

== Alabama ==
Alabama State Auditor election
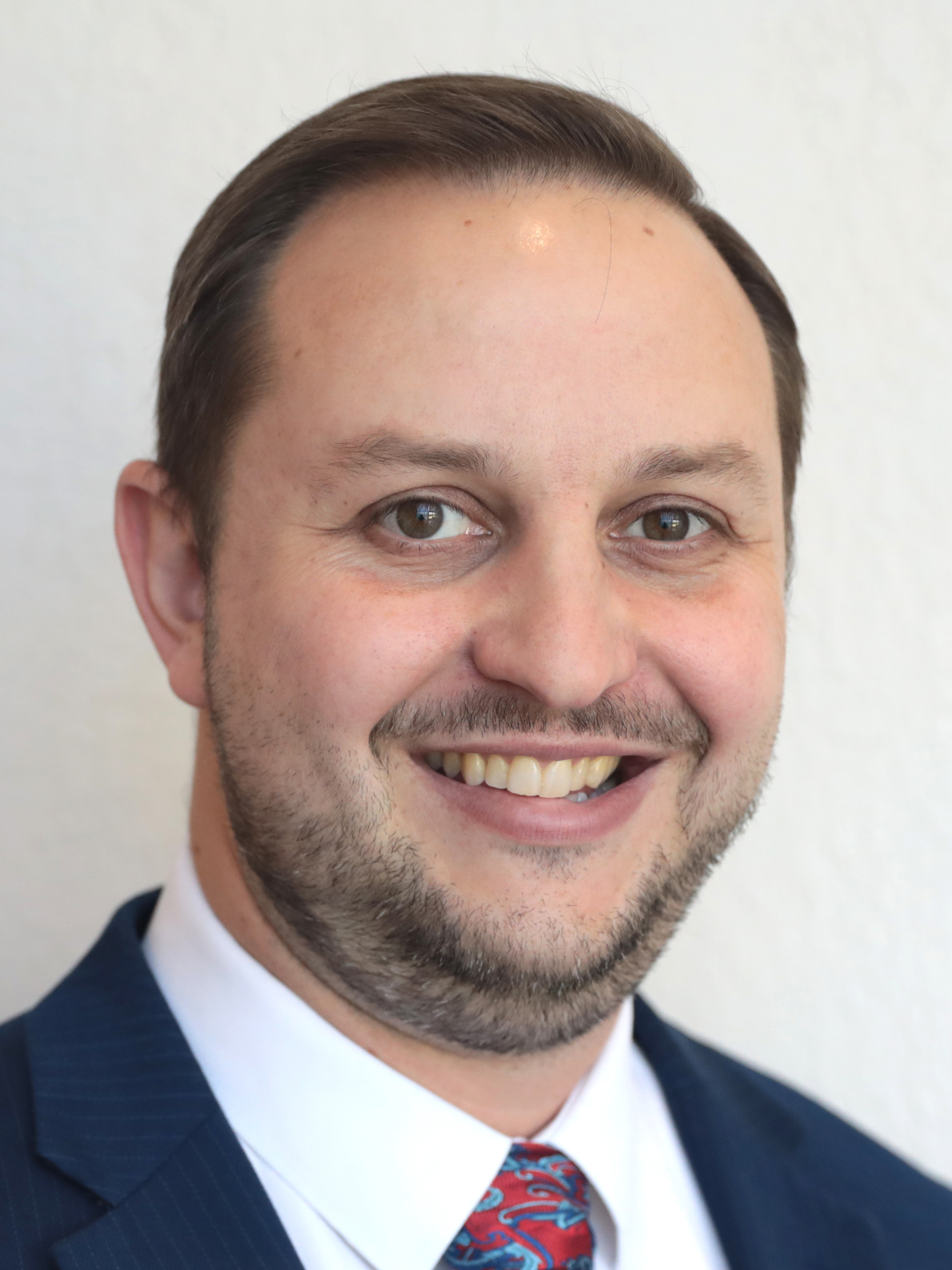

Candidate	Andrew Sorrell	Violet Edwards
Party	Republican	Democratic
Incumbent State Auditor
Andrew Sorrell
Republican

One-term incumbent Republican Andrew Sorrell is eligible to seek re-election. After initially choosing instead to run for Secretary of State, on January 5, 2025, he announced his decision to withdraw from that race and instead seek re-election to a second term. Attorney Derek Chen, and former Kay Ivey communications director Josh Pendergrass are also running as Republicans.

== Arkansas ==
Arkansas State Auditor election
Nominee	Dennis Milligan
Party	Republican
Incumbent State Auditor
Dennis Milligan
Republican

One-term incumbent Republican Dennis Milligan is running for re-election.

== California ==
California State Controller election
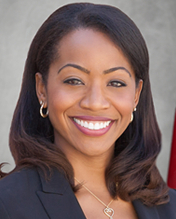

Candidate	Malia Cohen	Herb Morgan
Party	Democratic	Republican
Incumbent Controller
Malia Cohen
Democratic

One-term incumbent Democrat Malia Cohen is running for re-election. She is being challenged by Republican Herb Morgan.

== Connecticut ==
Connecticut State Comptroller election
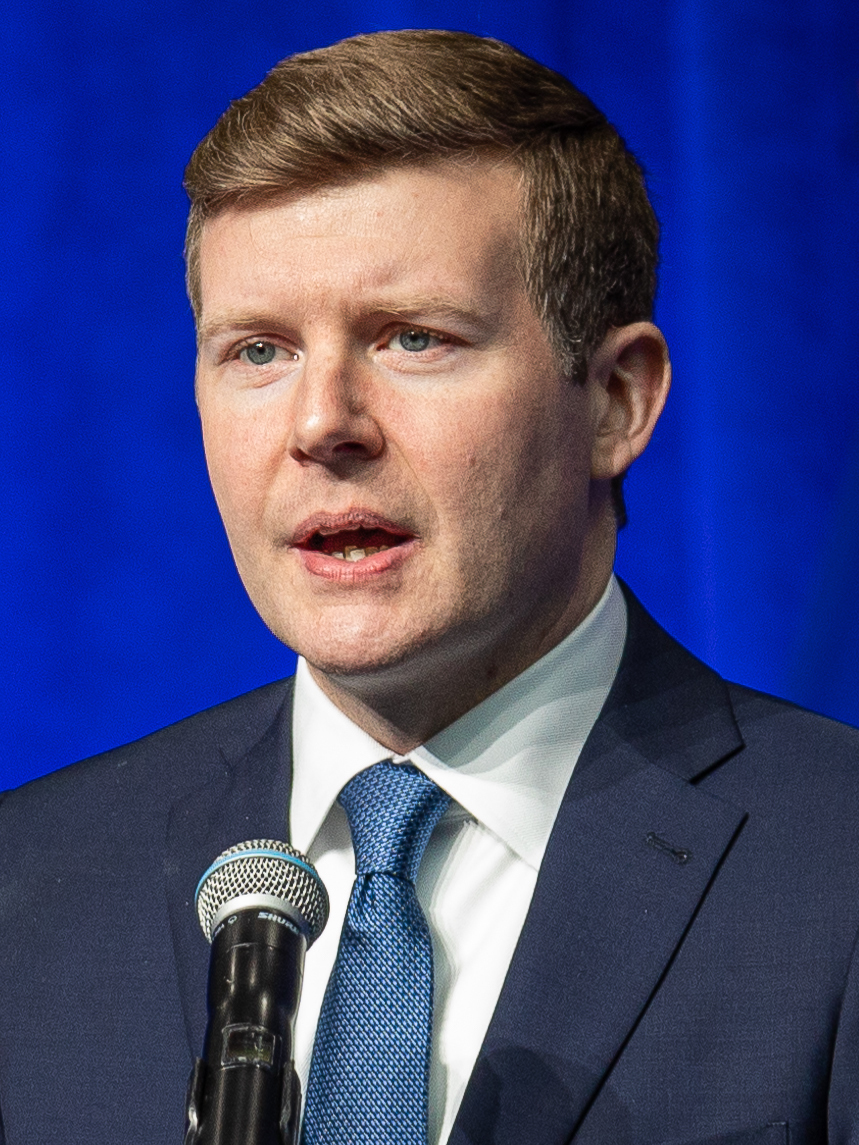

Nominee	Sean Scanlon	Jen Tooker
Party	Democratic	Republican
Incumbent State Comptroller
Sean Scanlon
Democratic

One-term incumbent Democrat Sean Scanlon is running for re-election. Former Westport first-selectwoman Jen Tooker announced her candidacy for the Republican nomination on January 30, 2026.

== Delaware ==
Delaware State Auditor election
Nominee	Lydia York	April Callaway
Party	Democratic	Republican
Incumbent State Auditor
Lydia York
Democratic

One-term incumbent Democrat Lydia York is seeking re-election. She is facing off against Republican nominee April Callaway.

== Idaho ==
Idaho State Controller election
Nominee	Brandon Woolf	Rakesh Mohan
Party	Republican	Democratic
Incumbent State Controller
Brandon Woolf
Republican

Four-term incumbent Republican Brandon Woolf is running for re-election. He is being challenged by Democrat Rakesh Mohan.

== Illinois ==
Illinois State Comptroller election
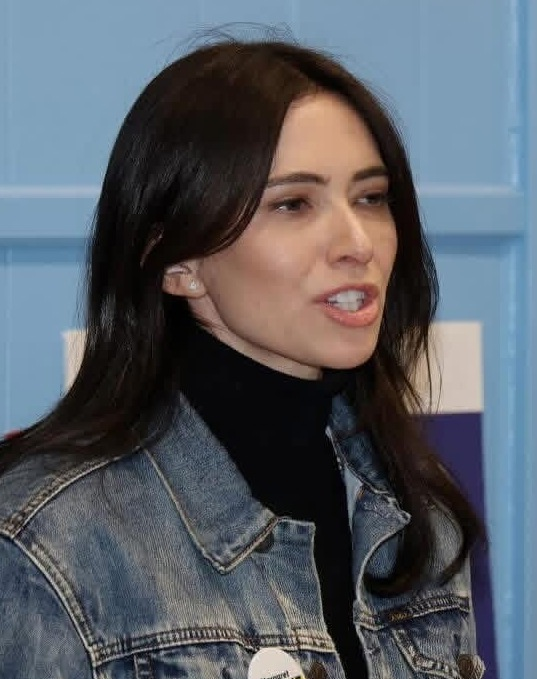

Nominee	Margaret Croke	Bryan Drew
Party	Democratic	Republican
Incumbent State Comptroller
Susana Mendoza
Democratic

Three-term incumbent Democrat Susana Mendoza is retiring.

Democratic candidates include state representative Margaret Croke, Champaign County auditor George Danos, former state senator Rickey Hendon, state representative Stephanie Kifowit, Lake County treasurer Holly Kim, and state senator Karina Villa. While Republican candidate Bryan Drew is running for this position.

== Indiana ==
Indiana State Auditor election
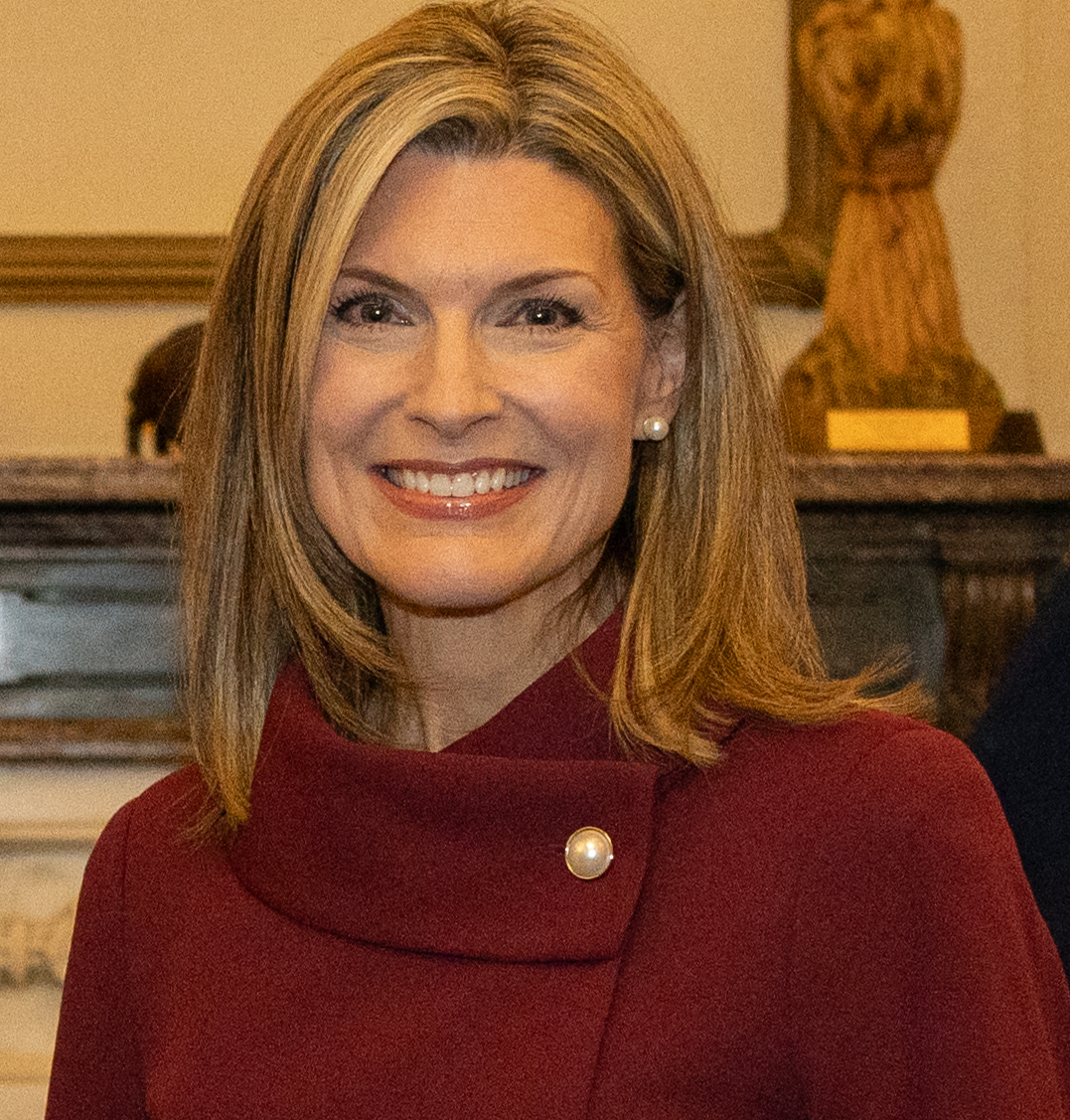

Nominee	Elise Nieshalla	Jessica Bailey
Party	Republican	Democratic
Auditor before election
Elise Nieshalla
Republican
Elected Auditor
TBD

One-term appointed incumbent Republican Elise Nieshalla is running for re-election. Democrat Jessica Bailey is running against her.

== Iowa ==
Iowa State Auditor election

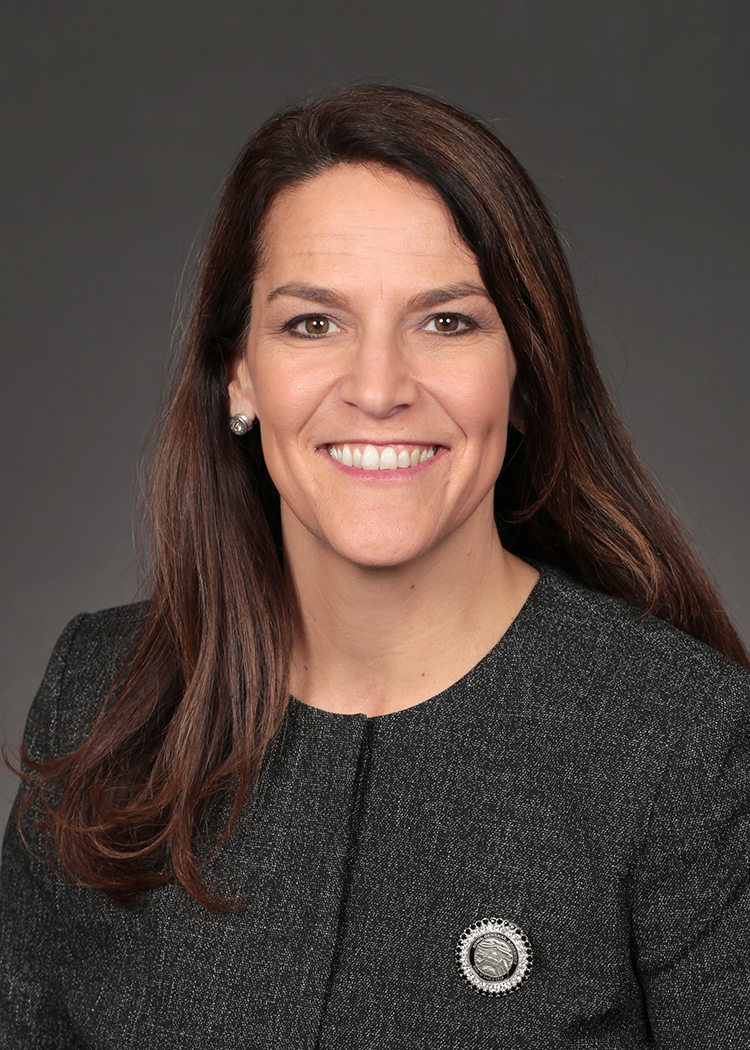
Nominee	Taylor Wettach	Chris Cournoyer
Party	Democratic	Republican
Incumbent State Auditor
Rob Sand
Democratic

Two-term incumbent Democrat Rob Sand is retiring to run for Governor. On April 28, 2025, Iowa Lieutenant Governor Chris Cournoyer and Iowa County supervisor Abigail Maas, both Republicans, have filed paperwork to run for State Auditor. Democrat Taylor Wettach and Republican Chris Cournoyer both won their respective primaries and will face each other in the general election.

== Maryland ==
Maryland Comptroller election

Nominee	Brooke Lierman	Sonya Dunn
Party	Democratic	Republican
Incumbent Comptroller
Brooke Lierman
Democratic

One-term incumbent Democrat Brooke Lierman is running for re-election. Sonya Dunn, a businesswoman and media personality, is running for the Republican nomination.

== Massachusetts ==
Massachusetts State Auditor election
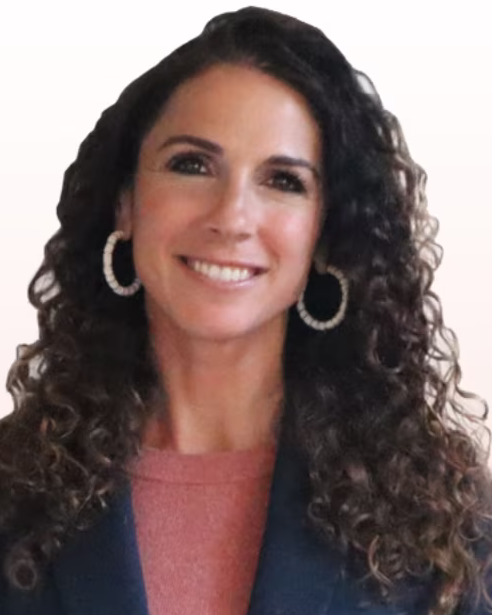

Nominee	Diana DiZoglio	Al Ozonoff
Party	Democratic	Libertarian
State Auditor before election
Diana DiZoglio
Democratic
Elected State Auditor
TBD

One-term incumbent Democrat Diana DiZoglio is running for re-election.

== Minnesota ==
Minnesota State Auditor election
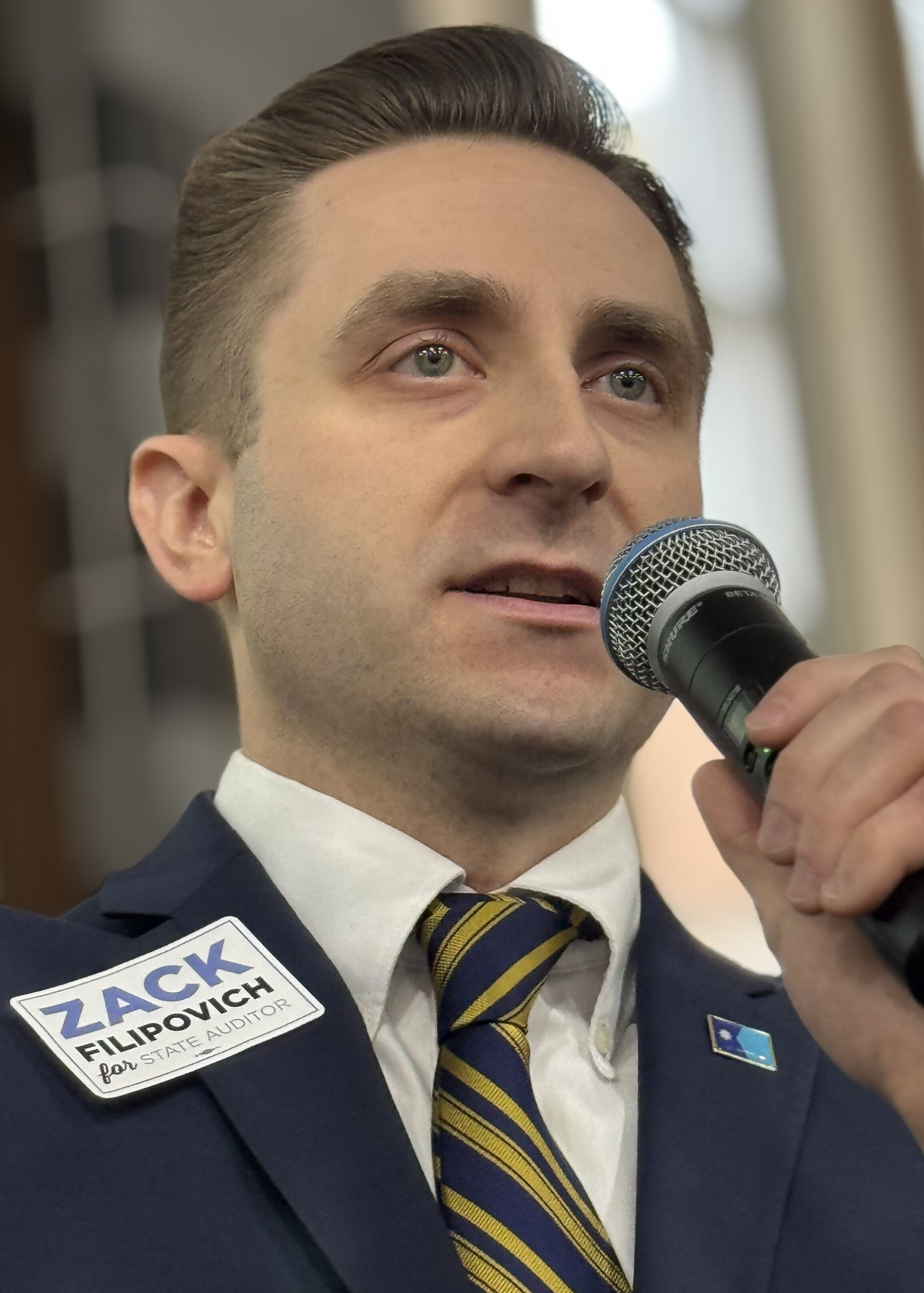

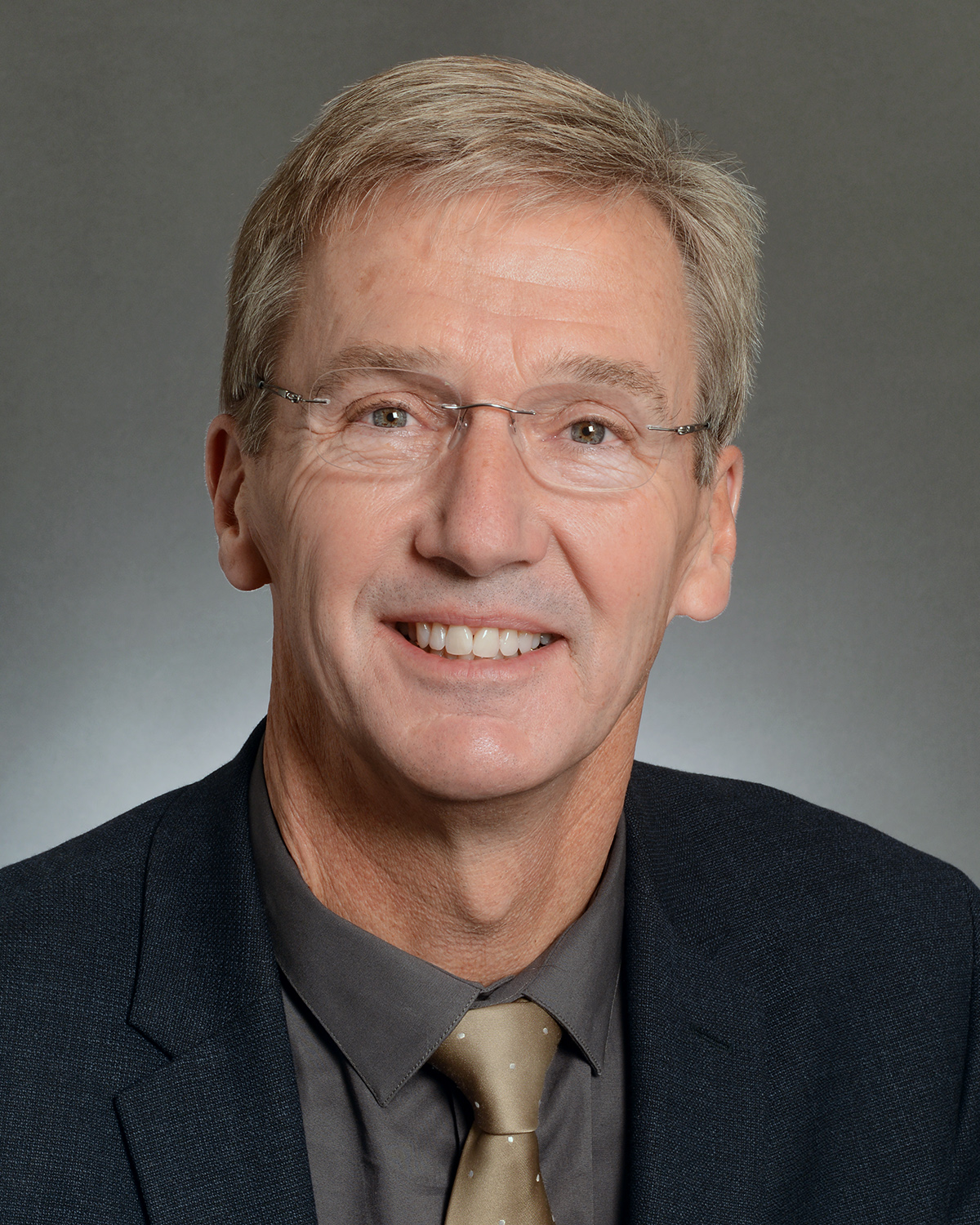
Nominee	Zack Filipovich	Scott Jensen
Party	Democratic (DFL)	Republican
State Auditor before election
Julie Blaha
Democratic (DFL)
Elected State Auditor
TBD

Two-term incumbent Democrat Julie Blaha is retiring.

State representative Dan Wolgamott and former Fergus Falls mayor Ben Schierer are running for the DFL nomination. Duluth city councilor Zack Filiopvich is also seen as a potential candidate. On the Republican side, state representative Elliott Engen and 2022 nominee Ryan Wilson are considering runs.

== Missouri ==
Missouri State Auditor election
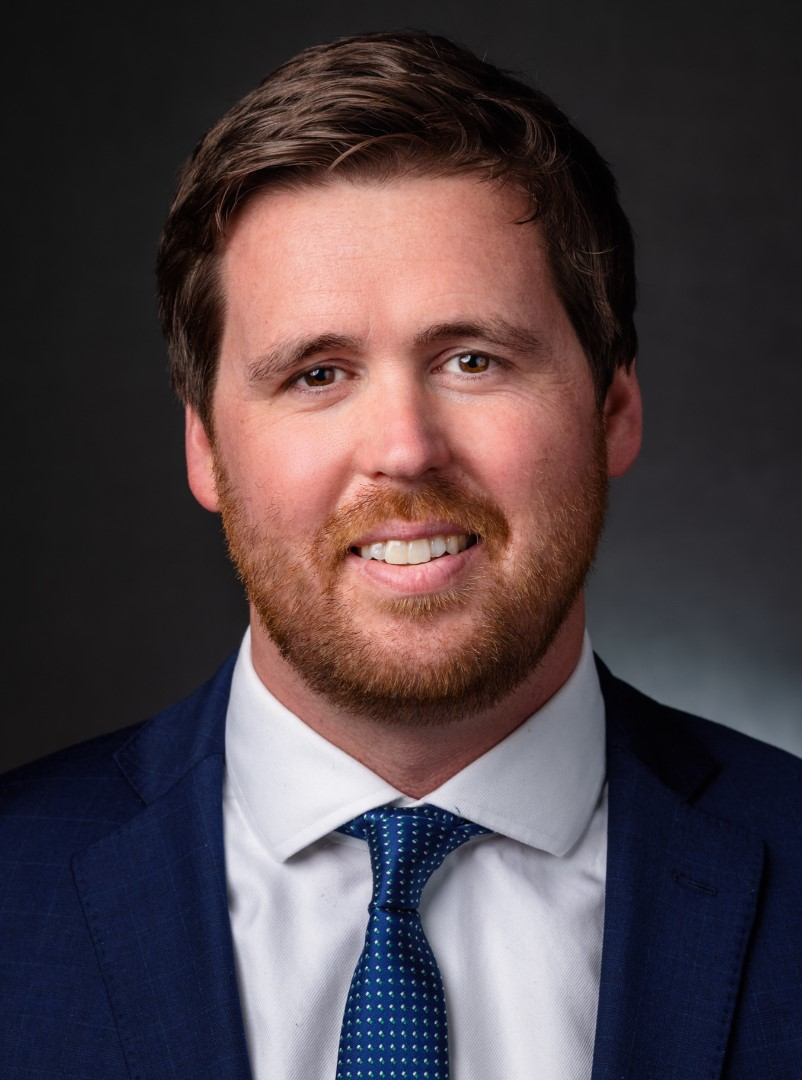

Nominee	Scott Fitzpatrick	Quentin Wilson
Party	Republican	Democratic
Incumbent State Auditor
Scott Fitzpatrick
Republican

One-term incumbent Republican Scott Fitzpatrick is running for re-election. Greg Upchurch and Quentin Wilson, both Democrats, have filed to run for office, as has Mike Carter, a Republican.

== Nebraska ==
Nebraska State Auditor election
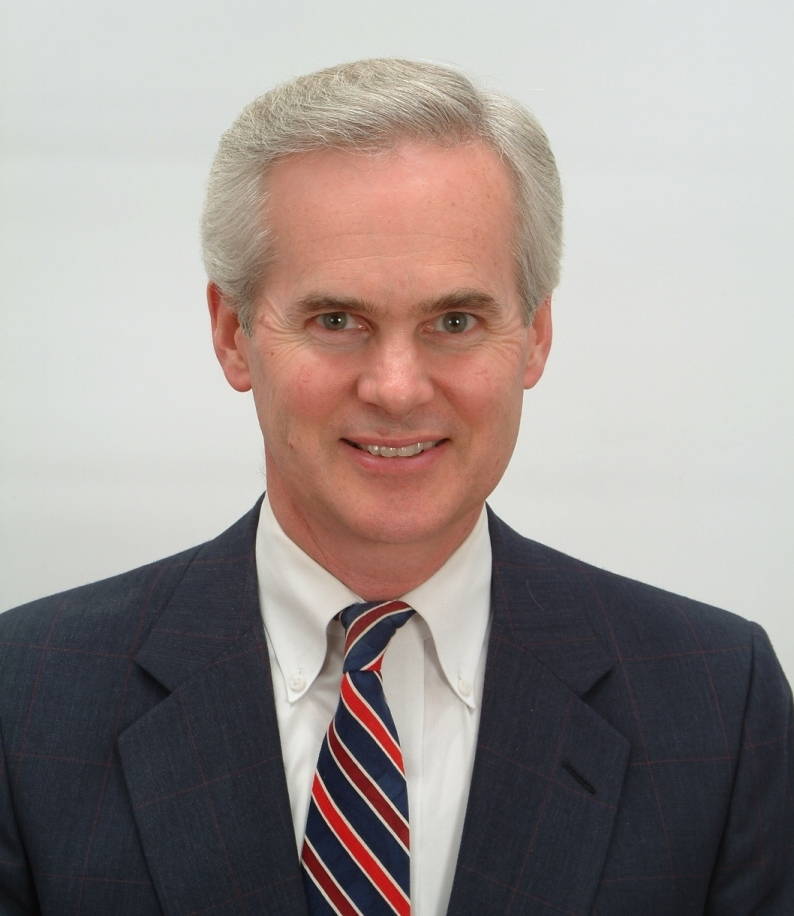

Nominee	Mike Foley	John Knight
Party	Republican	America First
Incumbent State Auditor
Mike Foley
Republican

One-term incumbent Republican Mike Foley is running for re-election.

== Nevada ==
Nevada State Controller election
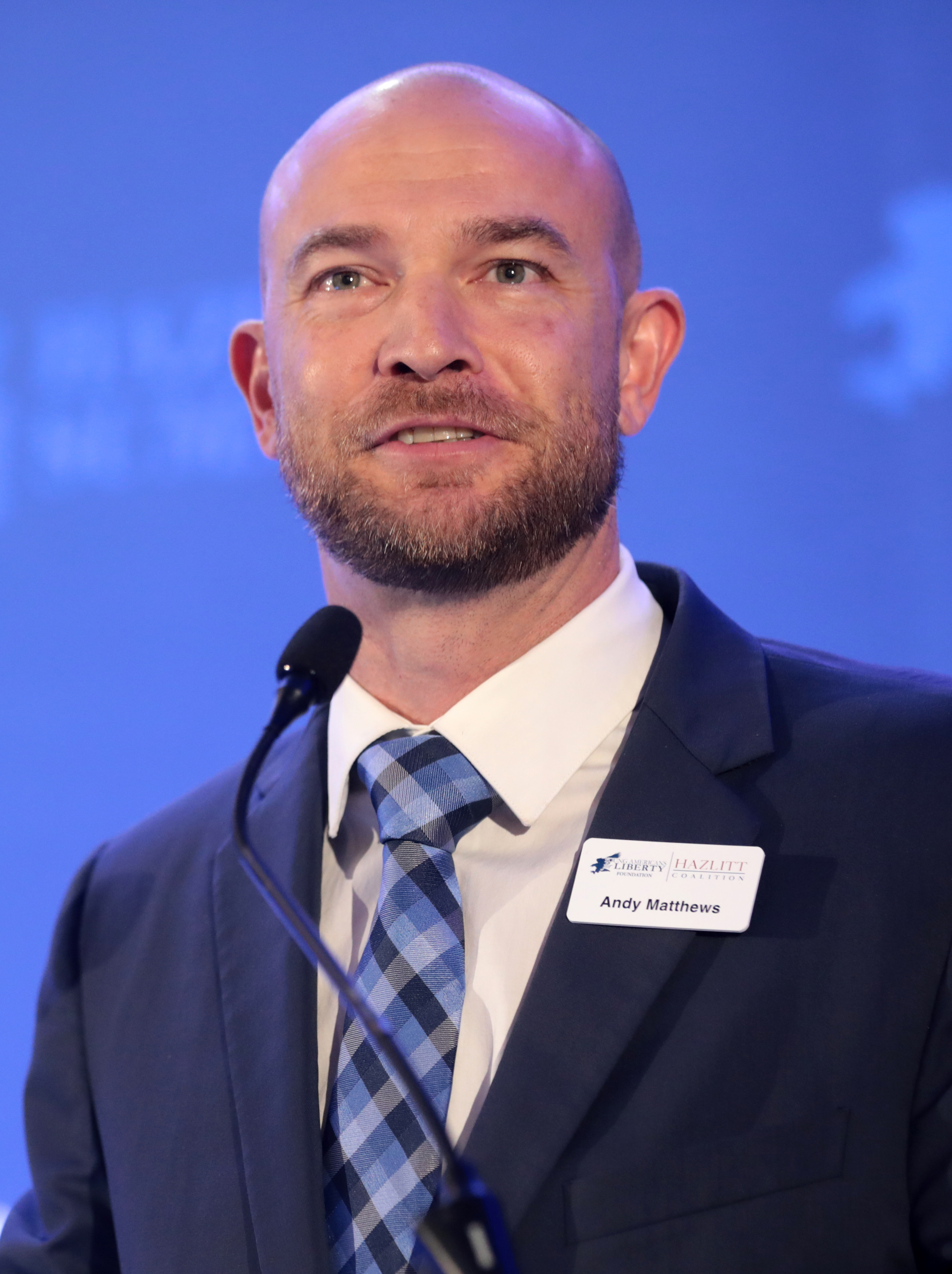

Candidate	Andy Matthews	Michael MacDougall
Party	Republican	Democratic
Incumbent State Controller
Andy Matthews
Republican

One-term incumbent Republican Andy Matthews is seeking re-election.

Teacher Michael MacDougall is running as a Democrat.

== New Mexico ==
New Mexico State Auditor election
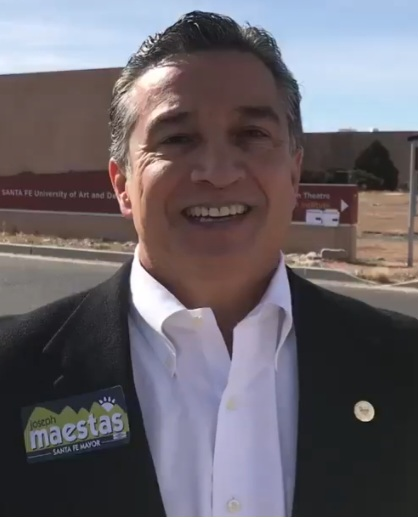

Nominee	Joseph Maestas	Joshua Lawrence
Party	Democratic	Republican
Incumbent State Auditor
Joseph Maestas
Democratic

One-term incumbent Democrat Joseph Maestas is seeking re-election. He is being challenged by Republican Joshua Lawrence.

== New York ==
New York State Comptroller election

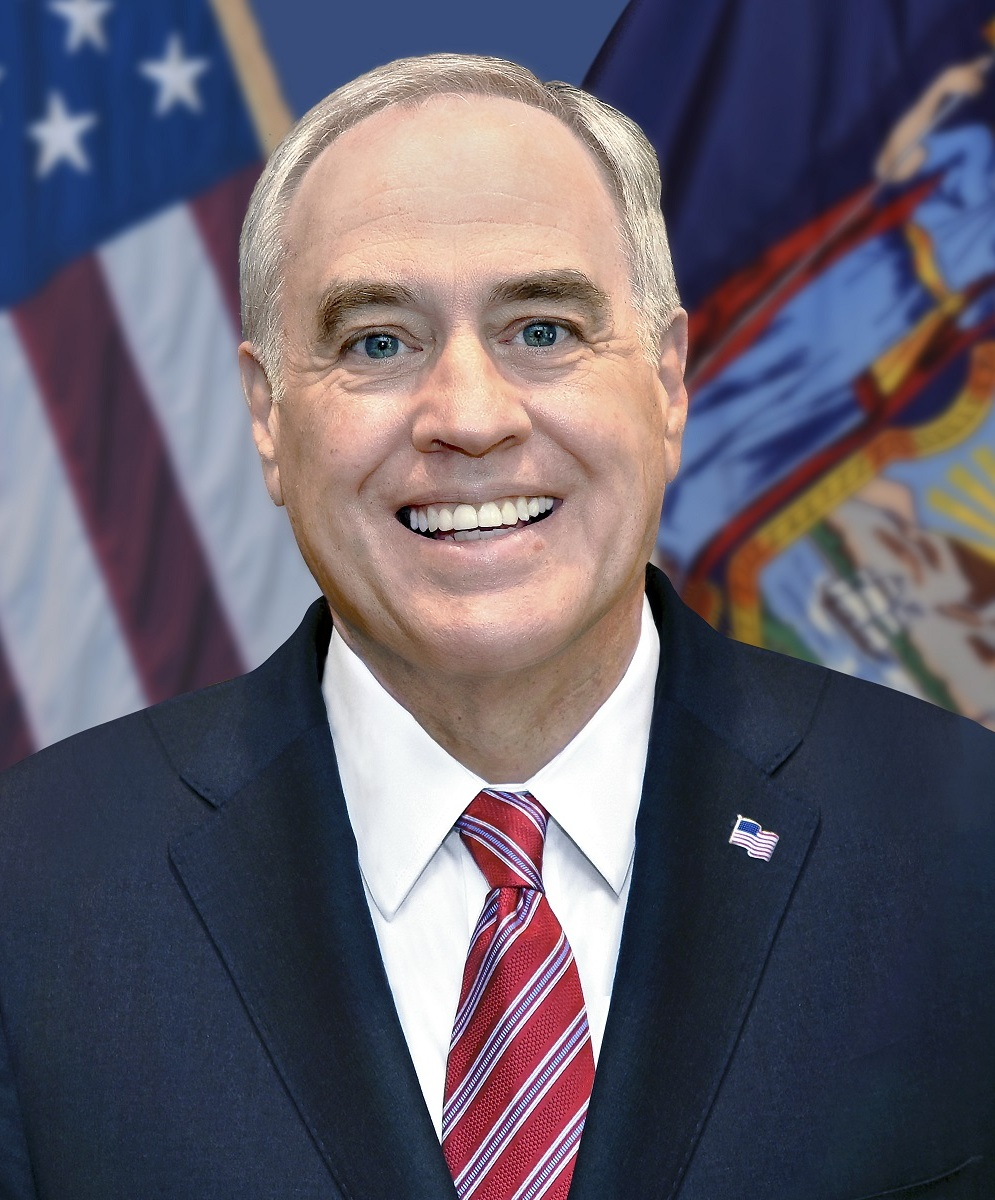

Nominee	Thomas DiNapoli	Joseph Hernandez
Party	Democratic	Republican
Alliance	Working Families	Conservative
Incumbent Comptroller
Thomas DiNapoli
Democratic

Four-term incumbent Democrat Thomas DiNapoli is running for re-election. He is being challenged by Republican biotechnology entrepreneur Joseph Hernandez.

== Ohio ==
Ohio State Auditor election
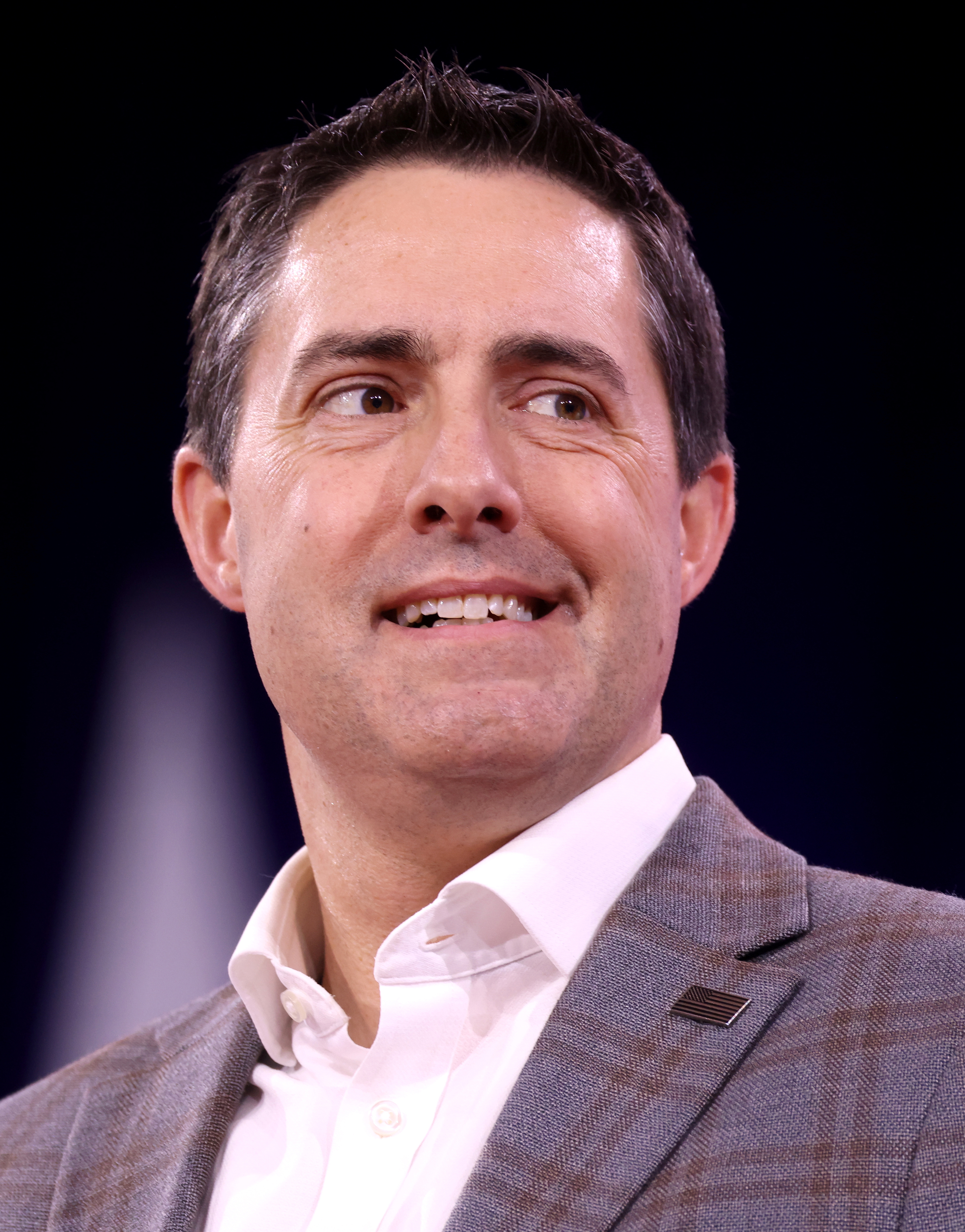

Nominee	Frank LaRose	Annette Blackwell
Party	Republican	Democratic
Incumbent State Auditor
Keith Faber
Republican

Two-term incumbent Republican Keith Faber is term-limited. Secretary of State Frank LaRose is running for the Republican nomination.

== Oklahoma ==
Oklahoma State Auditor election
Nominee	Melissa Capps
Party	Republican
State Auditor before election
Cindy Byrd
Republican
Elected State Auditor
Melissa Capps
Republican

Two-term incumbent Republican Cindy Byrd is term-limited. Republican Deputy State Auditor Melissa Capps ran for the position and was the only candidate to do so, winning by default.

== South Carolina ==
South Carolina State Comptroller election
Nominee	Tiffany Boozer	Mike Burkhold
Party	Democratic	Republican
Incumbent State Comptroller
Brian J. Gaines
Democratic

One-term appointed incumbent Democrat Brian J. Gaines has chosen not to run for a full term. Republican businessman Mike Burkhold in running for the Republican nomination. Tiffany Boozer won the Democratic nomination.

== South Dakota ==
South Dakota State Auditor election
Candidate	Catherine Barranco	Tom Cool
Party	Republican	Democratic
Incumbent State Auditor
Rich Sattgast
Republican

Two-term incumbent Republican Rich Sattgast is term-limited. Republican Sioux Falls city councilmember David Barranco is running for the Republican nomination with Sattgast's support. However, following his death, his wife, Cathrine Barranco, announced a bid and won the nomination. Democrat Tom Cool is challenging her.

== Vermont ==
Vermont Auditor of Accounts election
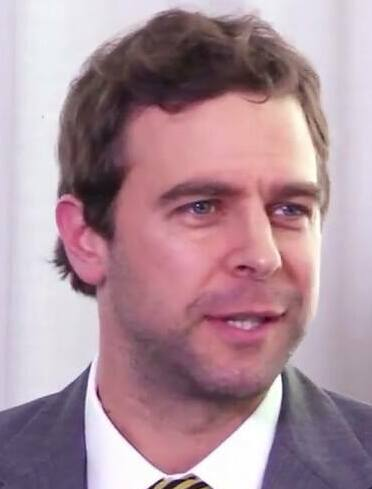

Nominee	Tim Ashe	Ivar Kronick
Party	Democratic	Republican
Incumbent Auditor of Accounts
Doug Hoffer
Democratic

Seven-term incumbent Democrat/Progressive Doug Hoffer is retiring.

== Wyoming ==
Wyoming State Auditor election
Nominee	Kristi Racines
Party	Republican
State Auditor before election
Kristi Racines
Republican
Elected State Auditor
Kristi Racines
Republican

Two-term incumbent Republican Kristi Racines is running for re-election.
