= 2022 United States state auditor elections =

- November 8, 2022

23 state auditor offices (Note: Seat tallies and popular vote do not include states that do not elect state auditors or territorial state auditors.)
	Majority party	Minority party
Party	Republican	Democratic
Seats before	17	15
Seats after	19	13
Seat change	▲2	▼2
Seats up	10	13
Seats won	12	11
- Democratic hold Republican hold Republican gain No election

The 2022 United States state auditor elections were held on November 8, 2022, to elect the state auditor of twenty-three U.S. states. The previous elections for this group of states took place in 2018, except in Vermont, whose auditor serves two-year terms and was elected in 2020.

These elections took place concurrently with various other federal, state, and local elections. They were one of only two slates of statewide elections in 2022 in which the Republicans made net gains, the other being the treasurer elections.

== Partisan composition ==
Going into these elections, this class of state auditors was made up of thirteen Democrats and ten Republicans. Democrats were defending two states won by Donald Trump in 2020 (Iowa and Missouri), while Republicans did not hold any states won by Joe Biden.

== Race summary ==
State	Auditor	Party	First elected	Last race	Status	Candidates
Alabama	Jim Zeigler	Republican	2014	60.4% R	Incumbent term-limited. Republican hold.	▌ ✓ Andrew Sorrell (Republican) 85.0%; ▌Leigh Lachine (Libertarian) 15.0%
Arkansas	Andrea Lea	Republican	2018	72.4% R	Incumbent term-limited. Republican hold.	▌ ✓ Dennis Milligan (Republican) 66.8%; ▌Diamond Arnold-Johnson (Democratic) 29.0%; ▌Simeon Snow (Libertarian) 4.2%
California	Betty Yee	Democratic	2014	65.5% D	Incumbent term-limited. Democratic hold.	▌ ✓ Malia Cohen (Democratic) 55.3%; ▌Lanhee Chen (Republican) 44.7%
Connecticut	Natalie Braswell	Democratic	2021 (appointed)	55.1% D	Interim appointee retired.	▌ ✓ Sean Scanlon (Democratic) 55.1%; ▌Mary Fay (Republican) 44.9%
Delaware	Dennis Greenhouse	Democratic	1982; 1989 (resigned); 2022 (appointed)	57.9% D	Interim appointee retired.	▌ ✓ Lydia York (Democratic) 54.2%; ▌Janice Lorrah (Republican) 45.8%
Idaho	Brandon Woolf	Republican	2012 (appointed)	100.0% R (Note: Woolf ran unopposed in 2018)	Incumbent re-elected.	▌ ✓ Brandon Woolf (Republican) 69.5%; ▌Dianna David (Democratic) 26.8%
Illinois	Susana Mendoza	Democratic	2016 (special)	59.9% D	Incumbent re-elected.	▌ ✓ Susana Mendoza (Democratic) 57.1%; ▌Shannon Teresi (Republican) 41.0%; ▌Deirdre McCloskey (Libertarian) 1.9%
Indiana	Tera Klutz	Republican	2017 (appointed)	55.5% R	Incumbent re-elected.	▌ ✓ Tera Klutz (Republican) 60.1%; ▌ZeNai Brooks (Democratic) 36.4%
Iowa	Rob Sand	Democratic	2018	51.0% D	Incumbent re-elected.	▌ ✓ Rob Sand (Democratic) 50.1%; ▌Todd Halbur (Republican) 49.8%
Maryland	Peter Franchot	Democratic	2006	72.1% D	Incumbent retired to run for governor. Democratic hold.	▌ ✓ Brooke Lierman (Democratic) 61.6%; ▌Barry Glassman (Republican) 38.3%
Massachusetts	Suzanne Bump	Democratic	2010	62.1% D	Incumbent retired. Democratic hold.	▌ ✓ Diana DiZoglio (Democratic) 55.1%; ▌Anthony Amore (Republican) 37.7%; ▌Gloria Caballero-Roca (Green-Rainbow) 2.9%; ▌Dominic Giannone (Workers Party) 2.2%; ▌Daniel Riek (Libertarian) 2.0%
Minnesota	Julie Blaha	DFL	2018	49.4% DFL	Incumbent re-elected.	▌ ✓ Julie Blaha (DFL) 47.5%; ▌Ryan Wilson (Republican) 47.1%; ▌Tim Davis (Legal Marijuana Now) 3.6%; ▌Dominic Giannone (Grassroots–LC) 1.8%
Missouri	Nicole Galloway	Democratic	2015 (appointed)	50.4% D	Incumbent retired. Republican gain.	▌ ✓ Scott Fitzpatrick (Republican) 59.4%; ▌Alan Green (Democratic) 37.6%; ▌John Hartwig (Libertarian) 3.0%
Nebraska	Charlie Janssen	Republican	2014	57.6% R	Incumbent retired. Republican hold.	▌ ✓ Mike Foley (Republican) 68.5%; ▌Leroy Lopez (Legal Marijuana Now) 19.3%; ▌Gene Siadek (Libertarian) 12.2%
Nevada	Catherine Byrne	Democratic	2018	50.6% D	Incumbent retired. Republican gain.	▌ ✓ Andy Matthews (Republican) 50.1%; ▌Ellen Spiegel (Democratic) 45.9%; ▌None of These Candidates 2.5%; ▌Jed Profeta (Libertarian) 1.5%
New Mexico	Brian Colón	Democratic	2022	57.6% D	Incumbent retired to run for attorney general. Democratic hold.	▌ ✓ Joseph Maestas (Democratic) 61.9%; ▌Travis Sanchez (Libertarian) 38.1%
New York	Thomas DiNapoli	Democratic	2007 (appointed)	66.9% D	Incumbent re-elected.	▌ ✓ Thomas DiNapoli (Democratic) 57.3%; ▌Paul Rodriguez (Republican) 42.7%
Ohio	Keith Faber	Republican	2018	49.7% R	Incumbent re-elected.	▌ ✓ Keith Faber (Republican) 58.7%; ▌Taylor Sappington (Democratic) 41.3%
Oklahoma	Cindy Byrd	Republican	2018	75.2% R	Incumbent re-elected.	▌ ✓ Cindy Byrd (Republican) 100.0%
South Carolina	Richard Eckstrom	Republican	2002	97.8% R (Note: Eckstrom was re-elected against write-in opposition in 2018)	Incumbent re-elected.	▌ ✓ Richard Eckstrom (Republican) 98.2%
South Dakota	Rich Sattgast	Republican	2018	64.0% R	Incumbent re-elected.	▌ ✓ Rich Sattgast (Republican) 62.7%; ▌Stephanie Marty (Democratic) 31.9%; ▌Rene Meyer (Libertarian) 5.5%
Vermont	Doug Hoffer	Democratic	2012	84.0% D/P	Incumbent re-elected.	▌ ✓ Doug Hoffer (Democratic) 65.3%; ▌Richard Morton (Republican) 34.6%
Wyoming	Kristi Racines	Republican	2018	73.7% R	Incumbent re-elected.	▌ ✓ Kristi Racines (Democratic) 98.7%

== Closest races ==
States where the margin of victory was under 1%:

1. Iowa, 0.3%
2. Minnesota, 0.4%

States where the margin of victory was between 1% and 5%:

1. Nevada, 4.2%

States where the margin of victory was under 10%:

1. Delaware, 8.4%

Blue denotes races won by Democrats. Red denotes races won by Republicans.
