= 2026 Idaho State Controller election =

- November 3, 2026
Nominee	Brandon Woolf	Rakesh Mohan
Party	Republican	Democratic
- Woolf: 50–60% 60–70% 70–80% 80–90% Mohan: 50–60% 60–70%
Incumbent State Controller
Brandon Woolf
Republican

The 2026 Idaho State Controller election was held on November 3, 2026, to elect the Idaho State Controller. Incumbent Republican State Controller Brandon Woolf was re-elected to a fourth full term in office; becoming the first controller to do so since Joe Williams in 1974. Woolf was challenged by Democratic nominee Rakesh Mohan.

Primary elections were held on May 19th, 2026. Primaries for both parties were uncontested.

== Republican primary ==
=== Candidates ===
==== Nominee ====
- Brandon Woolf, incumbent state controller

=== Results ===
Republican primary results
Party	Candidate	Votes	%
Republican	Brandon Woolf (incumbent)	187,668	100.0
Total votes		187,668	100.0

== Democratic primary ==
=== Candidates ===
==== Nominee ====
- Rakesh Mohan, visiting clinical professor at Boise State University's School of Public Service

=== Results ===
Democratic primary results
Party	Candidate	Votes	%
Democratic	Rakesh Mohan	42,938	100.0
Total votes		42,938	100.0

== See also ==
- 2026 United States state auditor elections
- 2026 Idaho elections
