= 2026 Wyoming State Auditor election =

- November 3, 2026
Nominee	Kristi Racines
Party	Republican
State Auditor before election
Kristi Racines
Republican
Elected State Auditor
Kristi Racines
Republican

The 2026 Wyoming State Auditor election took place on November 3, 2026, to elect the Wyoming State Auditor. Incumbent Republican State Auditor Racines won re-election to a third term in office unopposed.

== Republican primary ==
=== Candidates ===
==== Nominee ====
- Kristi Racines, incumbent state auditor

=== Results ===
Republican primary results
Party	Candidate	Votes	%
Republican	Kristi Racines (incumbent)	107,024	100.0
Total votes		107,024	100.0

== See also ==
- 2026 United States state auditor elections
- 2026 Wyoming elections
