= 2026 New Mexico State Auditor election =

- November 3, 2026
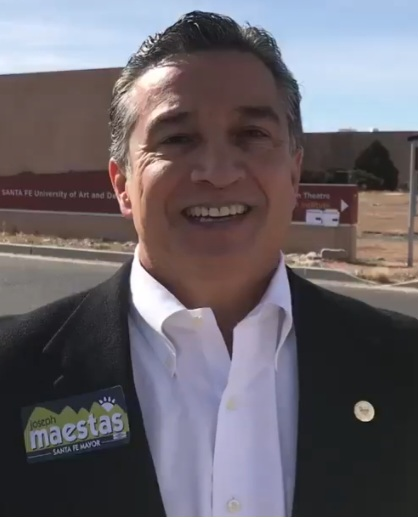

Nominee	Joseph Maestas	Joshua Lawrence
Party	Democratic	Republican
Popular vote	431,580	281,424
Percentage	60.5%	39.5%
State Auditor before election
Joseph Maestas
Democratic
Elected State Auditor
Joseph Maestas
Democratic

The 2026 New Mexico State Auditor election took place on November 3, 2026, to elect the New Mexico State Auditor. Incumbent Democratic State Auditor Maestas won re-election to a second term in office. Primary elections were held on June 2, 2026.

== Democratic primary ==
=== Candidates ===
==== Nominee ====
- Joseph Maestas, incumbent state auditor

=== Results ===
Democratic primary results
Party	Candidate	Votes	%
Democratic	Joseph Maestas (incumbent)	182,150	100.0
Total votes		182,150	100.0

== Republican primary ==
=== Candidates ===
==== Nominee ====
- Joshua Lawrence (write-in)

=== Results ===
Republican primary results
Party	Candidate	Votes	%
Republican	Joshua Lawrence (write-in)	29,268	100.0
Total votes		29,268	100.0

== Third parties ==
=== Candidates ===
==== Declared ====
- Jason Vaillancourt (Libertarian)

==== Disqualified ====
- Michael Vigil (Forward)

== General election ==
=== Results ===
2026 New Mexico State Auditor election
Party	Candidate	Votes	%	±%
Democratic	Joseph Maestas (incumbent)	431,580	60.5	
Republican	Joshua Lawrence	281,424	39.5	
Total votes		713,004	100.0	

== See also ==
- 2026 United States state auditor elections
- 2026 New Mexico elections
