= Donna Jones (American politician) =

American politician from Idaho (1939–2022)

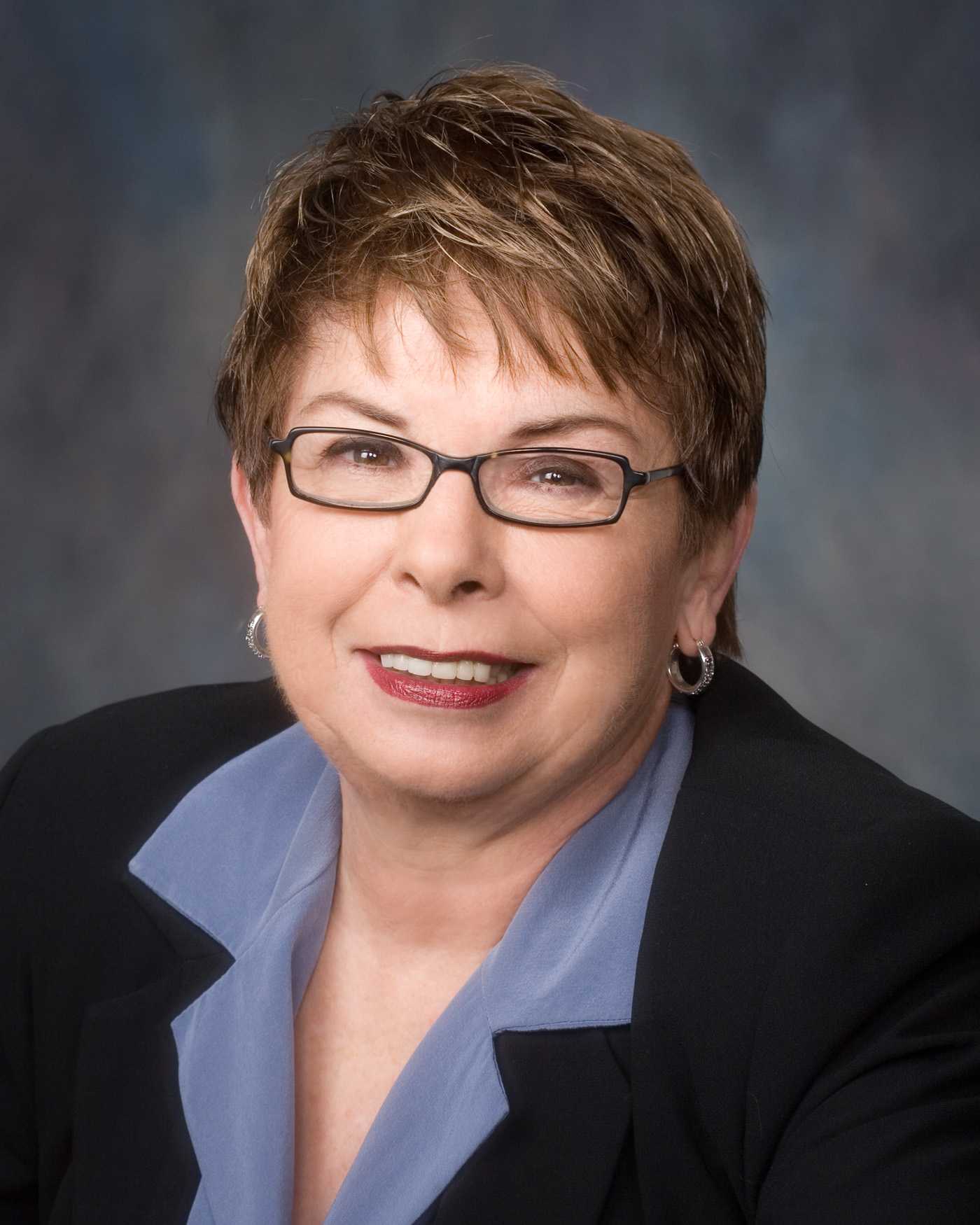

20th Controller of Idaho
- In office January 1, 2007 – October 15, 2012
- Governor: Butch Otter
- Preceded by: Keith Johnson
- Succeeded by: Brandon Woolf

Member of the Idaho House of Representatives from District 9 Seat B
- In office December 1, 1992 – 1998
- Preceded by: Judy Danielson
- Succeeded by: Tom Limbaugh

Member of the Idaho House of Representatives from District 10 Seat B
- In office 1989 – December 1, 1992
- Preceded by: Mary Hartung
- Succeeded by: Dorothy Reynolds

Member of the Idaho House of Representatives from District 13 Seat A
- In office April 20, 1987 – 1989
- Preceded by: Mike Strasser

Personal details
- Born: January 14, 1939
- Died: July 8, 2022 (aged 83)
- Party: Republican
- Spouse: Don Jones (deceased)

Donna M. Jones (January 14, 1939 – July 8, 2022) was an American politician. She served as the 20th Idaho state controller from November 7, 2006 to October 15, 2012.

Jones previously served twelve years in the Idaho House of Representatives which culminated in her being the first woman selected to chair the House Revenue and Taxation Committee. Jones was the first woman elected to serve as Idaho State Controller.

== Early life and career ==
=== Early years ===
Donna M. Jones was born at Brush, Colorado on January 14, 1939. She spent her early childhood at Rago, Colorado, which is located on the northeastern plains of the state about 20 miles outside of Akron, Colorado. Her father, Virgil Dale “Jim” Wolfe, was a farmer and operated a country store with her mother, Margaret Elizabeth “Libby” Wolfe (McDaniel). “Libby” was also the post mistress in Rago, Colorado.

Jones is the youngest of three children. Her sister, Arlene, the middle child, died at the age of 9 in 1945. Her older brother Darrel “Doc” Wolfe resided in Payette, Idaho until his death in the spring of 2014.

The Wolfe family moved to Middleton, Idaho in 1950 so “Doc” could attend college at the College of Idaho in Caldwell, Idaho, and to be closer to “Libby’s” sister who resided in Roswell, Idaho. In 1956 Donna married her high school sweetheart, Donald Jones.

== Career ==
She entered the workforce in 1958 as a sales consultant for the Party Plan Jewelry Company, selling Sarah Coventry jewelry. By 1959 she had moved into a management position, and was responsible for the sales training of new recruits in the Boise valley market.

In 1967 Donna and her husband Don purchased the local NAPA franchise in Payette, Idaho, Payette Auto Parts. In 1976 they expanded the business by opening a second auto parts store in New Plymouth, Idaho. They sold both stores in 1979.

In 1980 Jones was licensed to sell real estate in Idaho, and shortly afterwards in Oregon. By 1982 she had obtained brokerage licenses in both Idaho and Oregon. In 1984 Jones earned the GRI (Graduate of Realtors Institute) designation, and in 1987 she earned the CRS (Certified Residential Specialist) designation. In 1990 she opened her own real estate brokerage firm, ERA Preferred Properties, in Payette, Idaho. She retains her real estate brokerage license (on inactive status).

From October 1, 1998, through October 1, 2006, Jones served as executive director of the Idaho Real Estate Commission, the state regulatory body that educates, licenses, and regulates real estate licensees.

== Political career ==
=== Idaho State House of Representatives, 1987-1999 ===
In November 1986, the people of Idaho approved H.J.R 4, which banned floterial districts. However, legislative district boundaries in Idaho were not changed until the legislature adopted the recommendations of the state's redistricting committee, which was charged with using the decennial census results to redraw district boundaries prior to the 1992 election.

On April 20, 1987, Idaho Governor Cecil Andrus, a Democrat, appointed Jones, a Republican, to represent floterial District 13 in the Idaho House of Representatives. Jones replaced Mike Strasser, who had moved out of state for work-related reasons.

Jones stood for election in 1988, and retained her seat.

In 1989, four-term State Senator Roger Fairchild resigned his seat in District 10, and Governor Andrus appointed the District 10 Representative, Mary Hartung, to fill the Senate vacancy. Andrus then asked Jones to fill the District 10 House vacancy.

Jones was elected to the House seat for District 10 in 1990. In 1992, due to reapportionment, she ran for, and won, District 9. She was re-elected to the District 9 seat in 1994 and 1996.

Jones resigned her legislative seat in 1998 and accepted a position as executive director of the Idaho Real Estate Commission. Prior to resigning, Jones had already won the 1998 Republican primary election for the seat. Governor Dirk Kempthorne appointed Thomas Limbaugh to fill Jones’ vacancy. (Limbaugh won the general election.)

=== House Revenue and Taxation Committee ===
From 1997 to 1998 Jones chaired the House Revenue and Taxation Committee. She was appointed to this position by then-speaker of the Idaho House Mike Simpson, and was the first woman to hold the post.

=== State controller's office ===
Jones challenged incumbent state Controller, Keith Johnson in the 2002 Republican primary election. In the three-way race she finished second to Johnson by 4,052 votes, losing by 3.2%.

In the 2006 Republican primary Jones returned and vied for the open State Controller's seat against Royce C. Chigbrow. Jones won this primary race by 22,429 votes, a margin of 18.8%.

In the 2006 general election Jones faced Democratic candidate Jackie Groves Twilegar, and won by 73,969 votes, a margin of 17.06%.

Jones was involved in a serious automobile accident on May 25, 2012. She resigned on October 15, 2012, as a direct result of injuries sustained from the accident. She was succeeded by her chief of staff, Brandon D. Woolf.

== Community Involvement ==
Nationally, Jones has served on the board of directors and as Treasurer for the Association of Real Estate License Law Officials (ARELLO). She has held office as the American Legislative Exchange Council's (ALEC) Idaho Chairman and served on the organization's national Board of Directors, as well as being named an Outstanding ALEC Leader. Donna has also been recognized by the Idaho March of Dimes as an Outstanding Woman of the Year.

Jones is an Idaho Certified Public Manager and served on the Idaho Hispanic Commission, Idaho Housing & Finance Association Advisory Board, Idaho Permanent Building Fund Advisory Council, and Multi-State Tax Commission.

As a member of the National Association of State Auditors, Comptrollers and Treasurers (NASACT), Jones serves as the Vice Chairman of the International Committee, and sits on the Annual Conference Program Committee, Financial Management and Intergovernmental Affairs Committee (FMIAC), Governmental Accounting Standards and Market Oversight (GASMO) Committee, Committee on Outreach, and the Leadership Conference Task Force.

== Personal life ==
Don and Donna were married on June 9, 1956, in Middleton, Idaho, at the Methodist church. They have two daughters and a son. Don died on January 11, 2000. Jones died on July 8, 2022.

Political offices
| Preceded by Keith Johnson | Idaho State Controller; 2007–2012 | Succeeded by Brandon D Woolf |
