= Benjamin Gallagher =

American politician

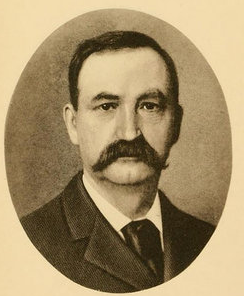

1st Auditor of the Wyoming Territory
- In office December 11, 1869 – June 4, 1870
- Succeeded by: James H. Hayford

Personal details
- Born: August 6, 1840 Pleasant Grove, Iowa, U.S.
- Died: March 23, 1900 (aged 59) Omaha, Nebraska, U.S.
- Resting place: Holy Sepulchre Cemetery, Omaha, Nebraska, U.S.
- Party: Democratic
- Other political affiliations: People's
- Spouse: Winifred Agnes Keogh
- Children: 2
- Parents: George Gallagher (father); Lavinia Zion (mother)

Benjamin Gallagher (August 6, 1840 – March 23, 1900) was an American politician who served as the 1st Auditor of the Wyoming Territory as a Democrat.

== Life ==
On August 6, 1840 Benjamin Gallagher was born in Pleasant Grove, Iowa to Lavinia Zion and George Gallagher. In 1862 he moved to the Nebraska Territory where he was appointed as post trader at Fort McPherson and later to Cheyenne in the Wyoming Territory. On May 25, 1869 he served as one of the Grand Jurors on the first court of Cheyenne and later ran as a member of the People's Party for city council before joining the Democratic Party. He was appointed as Auditior of the Territory by Territorial Governor John Allen Campbell and took the oath of office on December 11, 1869 and served until June 4, 1870. He later moved back to Omaha, Nebraska and in the 1890s became a supporter of the free silver movement.

In 1896 he suffered a stroke and would later suffer another one, but survived both. On March 23, 1900 he suffered a third stroke and died at his home in Omaha, Nebraska at age 59.
