= Valerie Espinoza =

American politician

Member of the New Mexico Public Regulation Commission from the 3rd district
- In office January 1, 2013 – January 1, 2021
- Preceded by: Douglas J. Howe
- Succeeded by: Joseph Maestas

Personal details
- Party: Democratic
- Education: Northern New Mexico College (AAS); College of Santa Fe (BA)

Valerie Espinoza is an American politician from New Mexico. She was a member of the New Mexico Public Regulation Commission from the 3rd district, covering all of Los Alamos and Taos Counties, and parts of Bernalillo, Mora, Rio Arriba, San Miguel, Sandoval, and Santa Fe Counties.

From 1979 to 1984, Espinoza served several positions in the office of the New Mexico Secretary of State, including supervisor of the Notary Public Division. She then worked at Los Alamos National Laboratory from 1984 to 2004, rising to executive office administrator for deputy associate laboratory director. She earned an A.A.S. in human services from Northern New Mexico College in 1993 and graduated from the College of Santa Fe (now Santa Fe University of Art and Design) with a B.A. in organizational psychology in 1997.

Espinoza was elected Clerk of Santa Fe County in 2004, serving two terms. In addition, she hosts "Santa Fe County Today," a public access government affairs show on SFC-TV (Channel 16). In June 2012, Espinoza won the Democratic nomination for Public Regulation Commissioner from the 3rd district, defeating three other candidates, with 38%. She was elected unopposed in the general elections in both 2012 and 2016. She was chosen to be Vice Chair in 2013 and 2014 and became Chair of the Commission in 2016. In addition, she chaired the Commission's Wildfire Task Force.
