= 2026 California State Controller election =

American election

- November 3, 2026
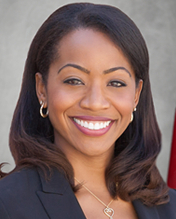

Candidate	Malia Cohen	Herb Morgan
Party	Democratic	Republican
Popular vote	8,526,505	4,477,513
Percentage	65.6%	34.4%
- Cohen: 50–60% 60–70% 70–80% 80–90% Morgan: 50–60% 60–70% 70–80%
Controller before election
Malia Cohen
Democratic
Elected Controller
Malia Cohen
Democratic

The 2026 California State Controller election was held on November 3, 2026, to elect the California state controller. The nonpartisan top-two primary election will take place on June 2, 2026. Incumbent Democrat Malia Cohen was elected in 2022 with 55.35% to Republican opponent Lanhee Chen's 44.65%. This margin was the closest of the 2022 statewide elections in California. After previously mulling a run for state treasurer, Cohen decided to run for reelection to a second term. Republican Herb Morgan also ran.

== Candidates ==
=== Democratic Party ===
==== Advanced to general ====
- Malia Cohen, incumbent California State Controller (2023–present)

=== Republican Party ===
==== Advanced to general ====
- Herb Morgan, CIO of Cantor Fitzgerald

=== Peace and Freedom Party ===
==== Eliminated in primary ====
- Meghann Adams, union president of SMART Local 1741 (2020–present) and candidate for state treasurer in 2022

== Primary election ==
=== Endorsements ===
Meghann Adams (PFP)

Political parties

- Green Party of California
- Peace and Freedom Party
Malia Cohen (D)

Labor unions

- California Faculty Association
- California Federation of Labor Unions
- California Nurses Association
- Los Angeles County Federation of Labor
- SEIU California
- SEIU United Healthcare Workers West
- International Brotherhood of Teamsters California and Local 665

Organizations

- Black Women Organized for Political Action PAC
- Sierra Club California and Angeles Chapter
- Stonewall Democratic Club
- Vote Mama

Political parties

- California Democratic Party

Newspapers

- Bay Area Reporter
- San Francisco Chronicle
- Sun-Reporter
Herb Morgan (R)

Organizations

- California Rifle and Pistol Association

Political parties

- California Republican Party
- Unity Party of America and California

Newspapers

- McClatchy Media California (Note: The Sacramento Bee, The Modesto Bee, The Fresno Bee, Merced Sun-Star, and The Tribune)

=== Results ===
Results by county Cohen: 40–50%; 50–60%; 60–70%; 70–80%; Morgan: 40–50%; 50–60%; 60–70%; 70–80%

Blanket primary results
Party	Candidate	Votes	%
Democratic	Malia Cohen (incumbent)	4,909,613	56.80
Republican	Herb Morgan	3,244,252	37.53
Peace and Freedom	Meghann Adams	489,663	5.67
Total votes		8,643,528	100.00

==== By county ====
County	Malia Cohen Democratic		Herb Morgan Republican		Meghann Adams Peace and Freedom		Margin		Total
County	#	%	#	%	#	%	#	%	Total
Alameda	272,859	72.93%	71,973	19.24%	29,281	7.83%	200,886	53.70%	374,113
Alpine	289	60.97%	164	34.60%	21	4.43%	125	26.37%	474
Amador	5,086	33.67%	9,537	63.14%	481	3.18%	-4,451	-29.47%	15,104
Butte	25,072	42.93%	30,673	52.52%	2,657	4.55%	-5,601	-9.59%	58,402
Calaveras	5,526	33.32%	10,559	63.66%	501	3.02%	-5,033	-30.34%	16,586
Colusa	1,294	31.81%	2,640	64.90%	134	3.29%	-1,346	-33.09%	4,068
Contra Costa	192,991	65.61%	87,575	29.77%	13,597	4.62%	105,416	35.84%	294,163
Del Norte	2,487	40.01%	3,482	56.02%	247	3.97%	-995	-16.01%	6,216
El Dorado	28,603	39.76%	41,514	57.71%	1,823	2.53%	-12,911	-17.95%	71,940
Fresno	76,684	45.36%	84,058	49.73%	627	4.91%	-7,374	-4.36%	169,041
Glenn	1,588	25.76%	4,332	70.28%	244	3.96%	-2,744	-44.52%	6,164
Humboldt	22,938	60.31%	12,478	32.81%	2,620	6.89%	10,460	27.50%	38,036
Imperial	12,996	55.18%	9,203	39.07%	1,354	5.75%	3,793	16.10%	23,553
Inyo	2,528	45.22%	2,814	50.33%	249	4.45%	-286	-5.12%	5,591
Kern	53,852	38.22%	80,377	57.05%	6,658	4.73%	-26,525	-18.83%	140,887
Kings	7,665	36.22%	12,568	59.38%	932	4.40%	-4,903	-23.17%	21,165
Lake	7,563	47.89%	7,520	47.62%	709	4.49%	43	0.27%	15,792
Lassen	1,450	20.81%	5,317	76.31%	201	2.88%	-3,867	-55.50%	6,968
Los Angeles	1,226,698	61.99%	582,493	29.44%	169,675	8.57%	644,205	32.55%	1,978,866
Madera	11,133	37.06%	17,758	59.12%	1,147	3.82%	-6,625	-22.06%	30,038
Marin	70,148	76.50%	18,316	19.97%	3,232	3.52%	51,832	56.53%	91,696
Mariposa	2,364	36.74%	3,845	59.75%	226	3.51%	-1,481	-23.01%	6,435
Mendocino	14,813	62.95%	7,750	32.94%	968	4.11%	7,063	30.02%	23,531
Merced	20,247	46.45%	20,817	47.76%	2,526	5.79%	-570	-1.31%	43,590
Modoc	607	23.32%	1,901	73.03%	95	3.65%	-1,294	-49.71%	2,603
Mono	1,920	55.08%	1,432	41.08%	134	3.84%	488	14.00%	3,486
Monterey	47,814	62.60%	24,851	32.53%	3,721	4.87%	22,963	30.06%	76,386
Napa	24,833	64.03%	12,680	32.70%	1,269	3.27%	12,153	31.34%	38,782
Nevada	20,953	51.90%	18,020	44.64%	1,398	3.46%	2,933	7.27%	40,371
Orange	357,085	47.52%	364,039	48.45%	30,264	4.03%	-6,954	-0.93%	751,388
Placer	61,844	42.32%	80,591	55.15%	3,690	2.53%	-18,747	-12.83%	146,125
Plumas	2,688	37.53%	4,197	58.59%	278	3.88%	-1,509	-21.07%	7,163
Riverside	250,688	48.51%	243,423	47.11%	22,615	4.38%	7,265	1.41%	516,726
Sacramento	212,399	57.56%	137,850	37.36%	18,752	5.08%	74,549	20.20%	369,001
San Benito	8,483	55.43%	6,234	40.74%	586	3.83%	2,249	14.70%	15,303
San Bernardino	178,198	47.85%	174,873	46.96%	19,338	5.19%	3,325	0.89%	372,409
San Diego	444,730	55.11%	333,638	41.34%	28,607	3.54%	111,092	13.77%	806,975
San Francisco	175,509	72.62%	33,461	13.85%	32,710	13.53%	142,048	58.78%	241,680
San Joaquin	61,693	48.56%	59,588	46.90%	5,761	4.53%	2,105	1.66%	127,042
San Luis Obispo	48,521	51.18%	43,079	45.44%	3,199	3.37%	5,442	5.74%	94,799
San Mateo	130,255	71.00%	45,175	24.63%	8,021	4.37%	85,080	46.38%	183,451
Santa Barbara	61,796	58.93%	38,974	37.17%	4,088	3.90%	22,822	21.76%	104,858
Santa Clara	260,373	66.48%	114,260	29.17%	17,013	4.34%	146,113	37.31%	391,646
Santa Cruz	57,112	73.33%	16,378	21.03%	4,392	5.64%	40,734	52.30%	77,882
Shasta	15,597	30.17%	34,572	66.87%	1,528	2.96%	-18,975	-36.70%	51,697
Sierra	401	34.16%	742	63.20%	31	2.64%	-341	-29.05%	1,174
Siskiyou	5,029	37.19%	7,997	59.15%	495	3.66%	-2,968	-21.95%	13,521
Solano	59,090	59.73%	35,636	36.02%	4,195	4.24%	23,454	23.71%	98,921
Sonoma	110,132	69.59%	39,708	25.09%	8,412	5.32%	70,424	44.50%	158,252
Stanislaus	40,372	42.94%	49,795	52.96%	3,856	4.10%	-9,423	-10.02%	94,023
Sutter	7,371	33.54%	13,717	62.41%	891	4.05%	-6,346	-28.87%	21,979
Tehama	4,082	25.48%	11,416	71.25%	525	3.28%	-7,334	-45.77%	16,023
Trinity	1,435	42.09%	1,819	53.36%	155	4.55%	-384	-11.26%	3,409
Tulare	25,255	36.89%	40,311	58.89%	2,890	4.22%	-15,056	-21.99%	68,456
Tuolumne	7,247	37.50%	11,448	59.25%	628	3.25%	-4,201	-21.74%	19,323
Ventura	117,136	54.78%	88,373	41.33%	8,339	3.90%	28,763	13.45%	213,848
Yolo	36,496	65.04%	16,306	29.06%	3,313	5.90%	20,190	35.98%	56,115
Yuba	5,595	34.34%	10,005	61.41%	692	4.25%	-4,410	-27.07%	16,292
Totals	4,909,613	56.80%	3,244,252	37.53%	489,663	5.67%	1,665,361	19.27%	8,643,528

== General election ==
=== Post-primary endorsements ===
Malia Cohen (D)

Organizations

- Reproductive Freedom for All

=== Results ===
2026 California State Controller election
Party	Candidate	Votes	%	±%
Democratic	Malia Cohen (incumbent)			
Republican	Herb Morgan			
Total votes				

Counties that flipped from Republican to Democratic

- Butte (largest municipality: Chico)
- Fresno (largest municipality: Fresno)
- Inyo (largest municipality: Bishop)
- Kern (largest municipality: Bakersfield)
- Lake (largest municipality: Clearlake)
- Merced (largest municipality: Merced)
- Orange (largest municipality: Anaheim)
- Riverside (largest municipality: Riverside)
- San Bernardino (largest municipality: San Bernardino)
- San Joaquin (largest municipality: Stockton)
- San Luis Obispo (largest municipality: San Luis Obispo)
- Stanislaus (largest municipality: Modesto)
- Tulare (largest municipality: Visalia)

== See also ==
- 2026 California elections
- 2026 United States state auditor elections
