= 2026 California State Treasurer election =

- November 3, 2026
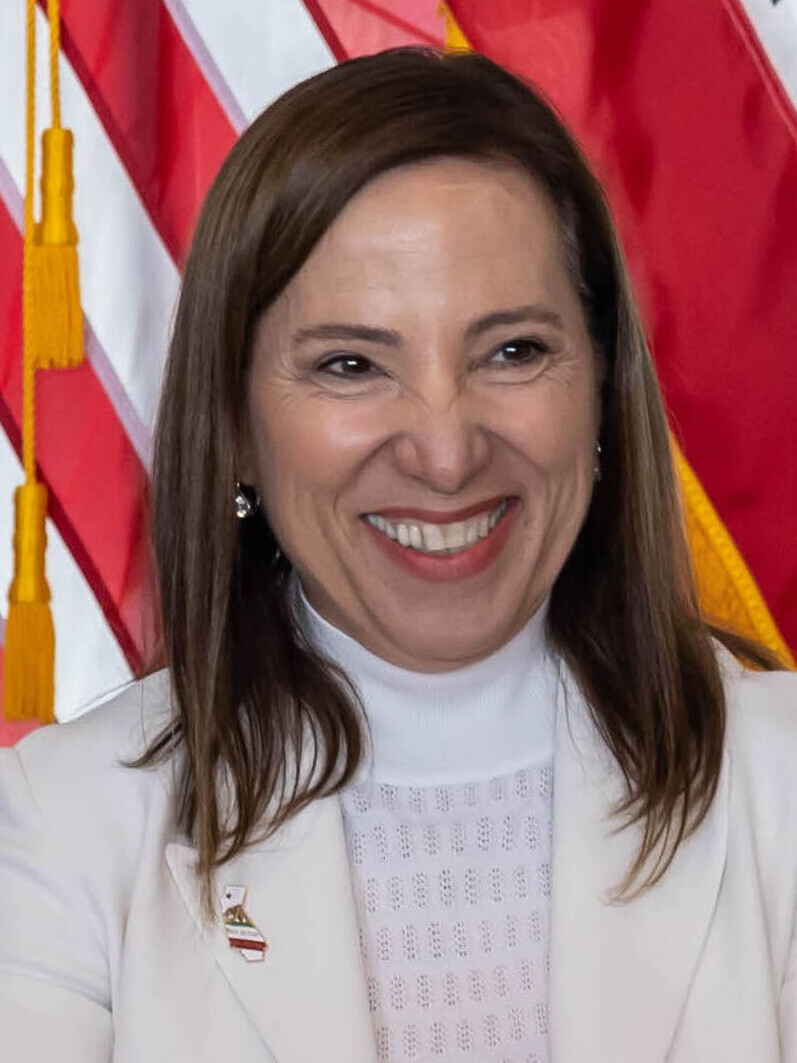

Candidate	Eleni Kounalakis	Jennifer Hawks
Party	Democratic	Republican
Popular vote	8,541,324	4,455,257
Percentage	65.7%	34.3%
- Kounalakis: 50–60% 60–70% 70–80% 80–90% Hawks: 50–60% 60–70% 70–80%
State Treasurer before election
Fiona Ma
Democratic
Elected State Treasurer
Eleni Kounalakis
Democratic

The 2026 California State Treasurer election was held on November 3, 2026, to elect the state treasurer of California. Incumbent Democratic treasurer Fiona Ma was term-limited and could not seek re-election to a third term in office; she instead ran successfully for lieutenant governor.

The filing deadline was March 6, while the top-two primary was held on June 2, with Democrat Eleni Kounalakis, the state's lieutenant governor, advancing to the general election alongside Republican Jennifer Hawks.

== Candidates ==
=== Democratic Party ===
==== Advanced to general ====
- Eleni Kounalakis, lieutenant governor of California (2019–present) (previously ran for governor)

Eliminated in primary

- Anna Caballero, state senator from the 14th district (2018–present)
- Tony Vazquez, member of the California State Board of Equalization (2019–present)

==== Withdrawn ====
- Libby Schaaf, former mayor of Oakland (2015–2023) (endorsed Kounalakis)

==== Declined ====
- Malia Cohen, state controller of California (2023–present) (running for re-election)

=== Republican Party ===
==== Advanced to general ====
- Jennifer Hawks, retired businesswoman

==== Eliminated in primary ====
- David Serpa, runner-up for California's 39th congressional district in 2024

=== Green Party ===
==== Eliminated in primary ====
- Glenn Turner

== Primary election ==
=== Endorsements ===
Anna Caballero (D)

U.S. representatives

- Jim Costa, CA-21 (2005–present)
- Zoe Lofgren, CA-18 (1995–present)
- Mark DeSaulnier, CA-10 (2015–present)

State legislators

- ~~Ben Allen, SD-24 (2014–present)~~ (endorsed Vazquez)
- Bob Archuleta, SD-30 (2018–present) (co-endorsement with Kounalakis and Vazquez)
- Jesse Arreguín, SD-7 (2024–present) (co-endorsement with Schaaf)
- Angelique Ashby, SD-8 (2022–present)
- Jasmeet Bains, AD-35 (2022–present)
- Mia Bonta, AD-18 (2021–present)
- Steven Bradford, former SD-34 (2016–2024)
- Juan Carrillo, AD-39 (2022–present) (co-endorsement with Kounalakis)
- Dave Cortese, SD-15 (2020–present)
- Bill Dodd, former SD-3 (2016–2024)
- María Elena Durazo, SD-26 (2018–present)
- Anamarie Avila Farias, AD-15 (2024–present)
- Lena Gonzalez, former majority leader (2024–2025) from SD-33 (2019–present) (co-endorsement with Kounalakis)
- John Laird, SD-17 (2020–present)
- Monique Limón, president pro tempore (2025–present) from SD-21 (2020–present)
- Jerry McNerney, SD-5 (2024-present)
- Josh Newman, former SD-29 (2016–2018; 2020–2024)
- Blanca Pacheco, AD-64 (2022–present)
- Steve Padilla, SD-18 (2022–present)
- Laura Richardson, SD-34 (2024–present)
- Robert Rivas, speaker (2023-present) from AD-29 (2018–present)
- Blanca Rubio, AD-48 (2016–present) (co-endorsement with Kounalakis)
- Esmeralda Soria, AD-27 (2022–present)
- Henry Stern, SD-27 (2016–present) (co-endorsement with Kounalakis)
- Tom Umberg, SD-34 (2018–present)
- Avelino Valencia, AD-68 (2022–present)

Labor unions

- California Conference of Carpenters
- International Union of Painters and Allied Trades
- United Association Local 246

Newspapers

- Bay Area Reporter
Jennifer Hawks (R)

Political parties

- California Republican Party
- American Independent Party
Eleni Kounalakis (D)

Executive branch officials

- Pete Buttigieg, former U.S. secretary of transportation (2021–2025)

U.S. senators

- Alex Padilla, U.S. senator (2021–present)
- Adam Schiff, U.S. senator (2024–present)

U.S. representatives

- Nancy Pelosi, former Speaker of the House (2007–2011, 2019–2023) from CA-11 (1987–present)

Statewide officials

- Rob Bonta, attorney general of California (2021–present)
- Fiona Ma, state treasurer of California (2019–present)
- Gavin Newsom, governor of California (2019–present)

State legislators

- Dawn Addis, AD-30 (2022–present)
- Bob Archuleta, SD-30 (2018–present) (co-endorsement with Caballero and Vazquez)
- Rebecca Bauer-Kahan, AD-16 (2018–present)
- Josh Becker, SD-13 (2020–present)
- Lisa Calderon, AD-56 (2020–present)
- Juan Carrillo, AD-39 (2022–present)
- Damon Connolly, AD-12 (2022–present)
- Mike Gipson, AD-65 (2014–present)
- Lena Gonzalez, former majority leader (2024–2025) from SD-33 (2019–present) (co-endorsement with Caballero)
- Matt Haney, AD-17 (2022–present)
- John Harabedian, AD-41 (2024–present)
- Gregg Hart, AD-37 (2022–present)
- Melissa Hurtado, SD-16 (2018–present)
- Jacqui Irwin, AD-42 (2014–present)
- Maggy Krell, AD-6 (2024–present)
- Josh Lowenthal, California State Assembly speaker pro tempore (2024–present) AD-69 (2022–present)
- Tina McKinnor, AD-61 (2022–present)
- Stephanie Nguyen, AD-10 (2022–present)
- Blanca Pacheco, AD-64 (2022–present) (co-endorsement with Caballero)
- Diane Papan, AD-21 (2022–present)
- Darshana Patel, AD-76 (2024–present)
- Cottie Petrie-Norris, AD-73 (2018–present)
- Sharon Quirk-Silva, AD-65 (2012–2014, 2016–present)
- Blanca Rubio, AD-48 (2016–present) (co-endorsement with Caballero)
- Susan Rubio, SD-22 (2018–present)
- Catherine Stefani, AD-19 (2024–present)
- Henry Stern, SD-27 (2016–present) (co-endorsement with Caballero)
- Aisha Wahab, SD-10 (2022–present)
- Akilah Weber, SD-39 (2024–present)

Local officials

- Libby Schaaf, former mayor of Oakland (2015–2023)

Labor unions

- California Federation of Teachers
- California Labor Federation
- California Professional Firefighters
- California Teachers Association
- International Brotherhood of Teamsters California and Local 665
- National Union of Healthcare Workers
- UNITE HERE Local 11
- United Food and Commercial Workers

Newspapers

- East Bay Times
- McClatchy Media California (Note: The Sacramento Bee, The Modesto Bee, The Fresno Bee, Merced Sun-Star, and The Tribune)
- The Mercury News
- San Francisco Chronicle
- San Francisco Examiner
- Sun-Reporter
Glenn Turner (G)

Political parties

- Green Party of California
- Peace and Freedom Party
Tony Vazquez (D)

State legislators

- Ben Allen, SD-24 (2014–present) (previously endorsed Caballero)
- Bob Archuleta, SD-30 (2018–present) (co-endorsement with Caballero and Kounalakis)
- Mike Gipson, AD-65 (2014–present)
- John Harabedian, AD-41 (2024–present)
- Tina McKinnor, AD-62 (2022–present)
- Rick Zbur, AD-51 (2022–present)

Local officials

- Joe Baca Jr., Vice Chair of the San Bernardino County Board of Supervisors

Organizations

- Stonewall Democrats
Libby Schaaf (D) (withdrawn)

U.S. senators

- Barbara Boxer, former U.S. senator from California (1993–2017)

State legislators

- Jesse Arreguín, SD-7 (2024–present) (co-endorsement with Caballero)
- Scott Wiener, SD-11 (2016–present)

Local officials

- Darrell Steinberg, former mayor of Sacramento (2016–2024)

=== Results ===
Results by county Kounalakis: 20–30%; 30–40%; 40–50%; 50–60%; 60–70%; Hawks: 20–30%; 30–40%; 40–50%; Caballero: 30–40%; Serpa: 30–40%

Primary election results
Party	Candidate	Votes	%
Democratic	Eleni Kounalakis	3,154,323	36.69
Republican	Jennifer Hawks	2,063,253	24.00
Democratic	Anna Caballero	1,410,005	16.40
Republican	David Serpa	1,106,595	12.87
Democratic	Tony Vazquez	609,482	7.09
Green	Glenn Turner	254,085	2.96
Total votes		8,597,743	100.0

== General election ==
=== Post-primary endorsements ===
Eleni Kounalakis (D)

Political parties

- California Democratic Party

=== Results ===
2026 California State Treasurer election
Party	Candidate	Votes	%	±%
Democratic	Eleni Kounalakis			
Republican	Jennifer Hawks			
Total votes				

Counties that flipped from Republican to Democratic

- Fresno (largest municipality: Fresno)
- Inyo (largest municipality: Bishop)
- Kern (largest municipality: Bakersfield)
- Lake (largest municipality: Clearlake)
- Merced (largest municipality: Merced)
- Orange (largest municipality: Anaheim)
- Riverside (largest municipality: Riverside)
- San Bernardino (largest municipality: San Bernardino)
- San Joaquin (largest municipality: Stockton)
- Stanislaus (largest municipality: Modesto)

== See also ==
- 2026 California elections
- 2026 United States treasurer elections
