= 2026 Nevada State Controller election =

- November 3, 2026

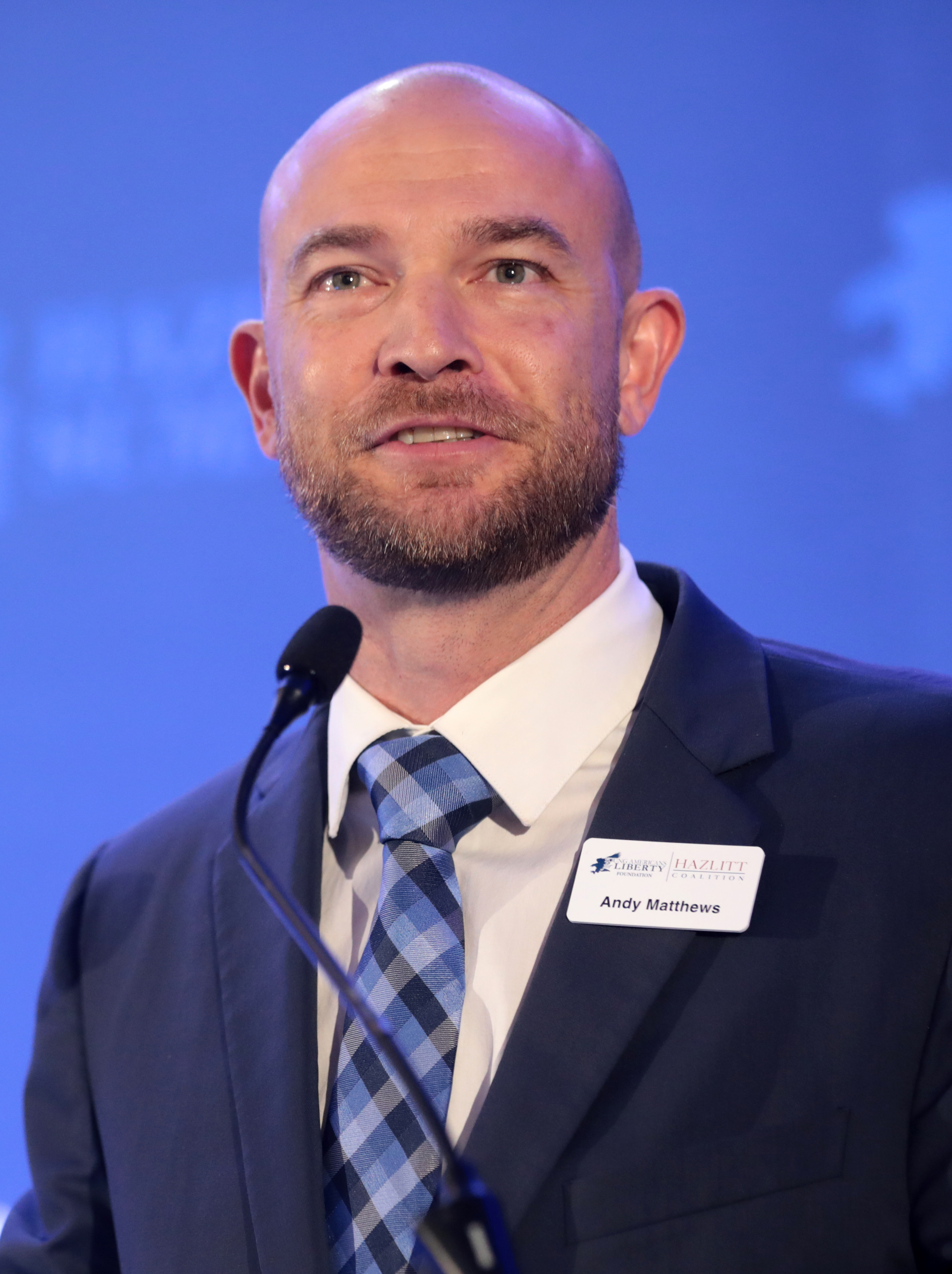
Candidate	Michael MacDougall	Andy Matthews
Party	Democratic	Republican
Popular vote	582,957	464,805
Percentage	54.39%	43.39%
State Controller before election
Andy Matthews
Republican
Elected State Controller
Michael MacDougall
Democratic

The 2026 Nevada State Controller election was held on November 3, 2026, to elect the state controller of Nevada. The primary election was held on June 9. One-term incumbent Republican controller Andy Matthews lost re-election.

== Republican primary ==
=== Candidates ===
==== Nominee ====
- Andy Matthews, incumbent controller

=== Endorsements ===
Andy Matthews

Party chapters

- Clark County Republican Party

== Democratic primary ==
=== Candidates ===
==== Nominee ====
- Michael MacDougall, teacher

==== Eliminated in primary ====
- Robert K. Blackstock, engineer
- Robert Tolle

=== Results ===
Primary results by county: MacDougall: 30–40%; 40–50%; Blackstock: 30–40%; 40–50%

Democratic primary results
Party	Candidate	Votes	%
Democratic	Michael MacDougall	80,627	45.3
Democratic	Robert K. Blackstock	58,895	33.1
None of These Candidates		21,111	11.9
Democratic	Robert Tolle	17,388	9.8
Total votes		178,021	100.0

== General election ==
=== Post-primary endorsements ===
Andy Matthews (R)

Newspapers

- Las Vegas Review-Journal
Declined to endorse

Newspapers

- Las Vegas Sun

=== Polling ===
Poll source	Date(s) administered	Sample size (Note: Key: A – all adults RV – registered voters LV – likely voters V – unclear)	Margin of error	Andy Matthews (R)	Michael MacDougall (D)	Other	Undecided
Noble Predictive Insights	September 22–26, 2026	800 (RV)	± 3.5%	31%	39%	7% (Note: "None of these candidates" with 4%; "Another candidate" with 3%)	23%
Noble Predictive Insights	September 22–26, 2026	708 (LV)	± 3.7%	37%	42%	5% (Note: "None of these candidates" with 3%; "Another candidate" with 2%)	16%

=== Results ===
2026 Nevada State Controller election
Party	Candidate	Votes	%	±%
Democratic	Michael MacDougall			
Republican	Andy Matthews (incumbent)			
None of These Candidates				
Total votes			100.0	
Democratic gain from Republican				
