= Michael MacDougall =

Nevada State Controller (2027-)

Controller-elect of Nevada
- Assuming office January 4, 2027
- Governor: Aaron Ford (elect)
- Succeeding: Andy Matthews

Personal details
- Born: 1993 or 1994 (age 32–33)
- Party: Democratic
- Education: Allegheny College (BA); University of Iowa (MA); University of California, Los Angeles (MA)

Michael MacDougall (born 1993/1994) is an American politician who is the controller-elect of Nevada.

MacDougall earned a bachelor's in political science from Allegheny College, a master's in religious studies from the University of Iowa, and another master's in Near Eastern studies from the University of California, Los Angeles.

MacDougall was the Democratic nominee for Nevada State Controller in the 2026 election. He defeated incumbent Republican comptroller Andy Matthews.

Political offices
Preceded by Andy Matthews	Controller of Nevada; Taking office 2027	Elect
