= 2022 Alabama State Auditor election =

- November 8, 2022
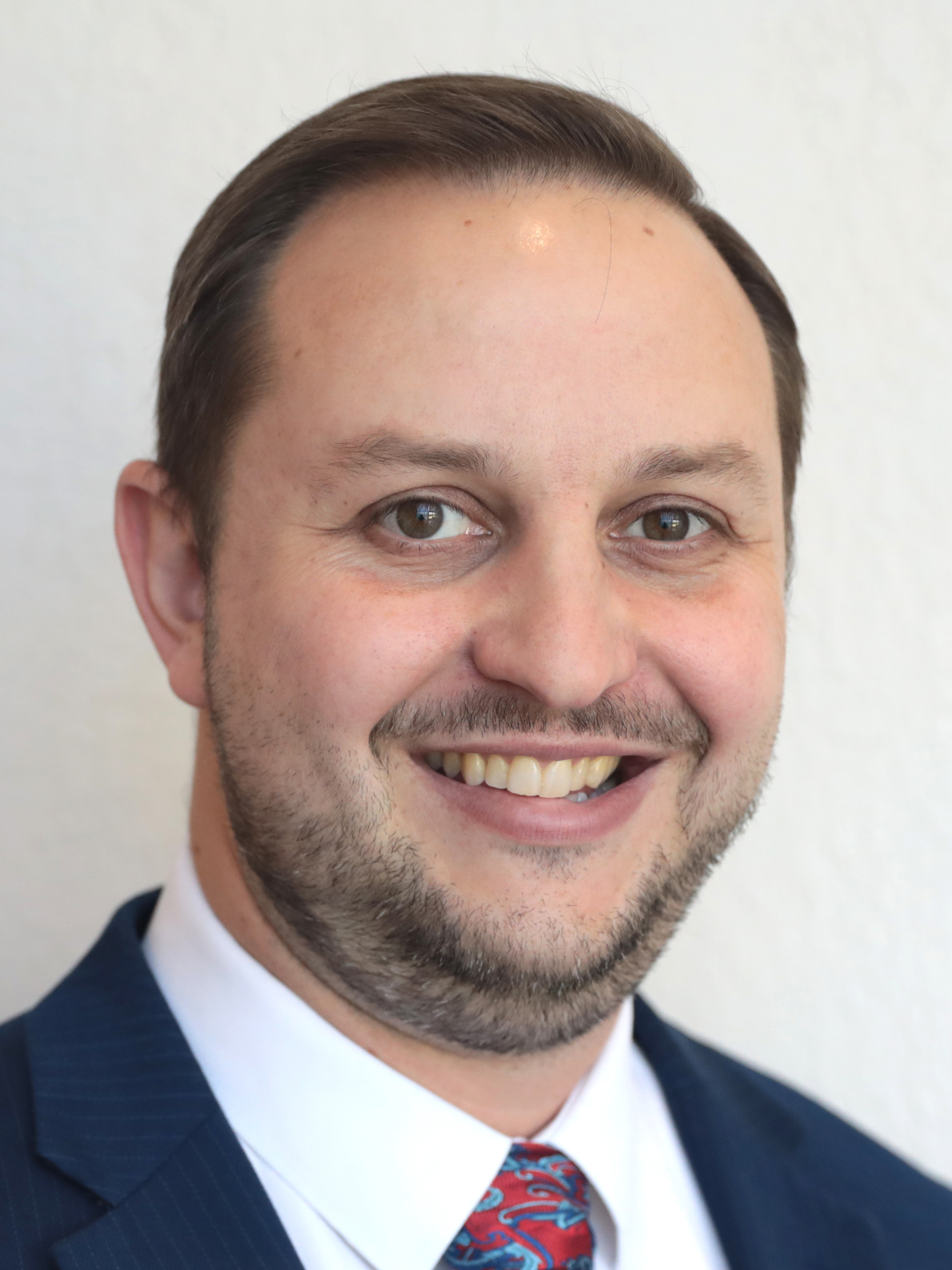

Nominee	Andrew Sorrell	Leigh LaChine
Party	Republican	Libertarian
Popular vote	947,266	166,760
Percentage	85.03%	14.97%
- Sorrell: 40–50% 50–60% 60–70% 70–80% 80–90% >90% LaChine: 40–50% 50–60% 60–70% 70–80% 80–90% >90% Tie: 40–50% No votes
Auditor before election
Jim Zeigler
Republican
Elected Auditor
Andrew Sorrell
Republican

The 2022 Alabama State Auditor election was held on November 8, 2022, to elect the State Auditor of the state of Alabama. Primary elections were held on May 24, with runoffs scheduled for June 21 if no candidate managed to receive a majority of the vote.

Incumbent Republican Auditor Jim Zeigler could not run for a third term due to being term-limited and instead chose to run for Secretary of State. State representative Andrew Sorrell won the general election against Libertarian nominee Leigh LaChine; no Democrats filed to run for this position.

== Republican primary ==
=== Candidates ===
==== Nominee ====
- Andrew Sorrell, state representative from the 3rd district.

==== Eliminated ====
- Stan Cooke, professional counselor and candidate for this seat in 2018. (eliminated in runoff)
- Rusty Glover, former state senator from the 34th district (2006–2018). (eliminated in first round)

=== First round ===
==== Endorsements ====
Stan Cooke

PACS

- FarmPAC
Andrew Sorrell

Organizations

- Alabama Republican Assembly

==== Results ====
Sorrell: 30–40%; 40–50%; 50–60%; 60–70%; 70–80%; Cooke: 30–40%; 40–50%; 50–60%; Glover: 30–40%; 40–50%; 50–60%; 60–70%

Sorrell: 30–40%; 40–50%; 50–60%; 60–70%; 70–80%; 80–90%; >90%; Cooke: 30–40%; 40–50%; 50–60%; 60–70%; 70–80%; 80–90%; >90%; Glover: 30–40%; 40–50%; 50–60%; 60–70%; 70–80%; 80–90%; >90%; Tie: 30–40%; 40–50%; 50%; No votes

Republican primary results
Party	Candidate	Votes	%
Republican	Andrew Sorrell	211,773	39.46%
Republican	Stan Cooke	175,970	32.79%
Republican	Rusty Glover	148,872	27.74%
Total votes		536,615	100%

=== Runoff ===
==== Debate ====
Candidates Cooke and Sorrell squared off in a debate at the Gardendale Civic Center just more than a week ahead of the Republican primary runoff on June 13, 2022. The debate was cosponsored by WYDE-FM and 1819 News.

2022 Alabama State Auditor Republican Primary Runoff Debate
No.	Date	Location	Host	Moderator	Link	Participants		
P Participant A Absent N Non-invitee I Invitee E Eliminated W Withdrawn								
P Participant A Absent N Non-invitee I Invitee E Eliminated W Withdrawn						Cooke	Glover	Sorrell
1	June 13, 2022	Gardendale	WYDE-FM	Becky Garretson; Ray Melick	Facebook	P	E	P

==== Results ====
Sorrell: 50–60%; 60–70%; 70–80%; Cooke: 50–60%; 60–70%

Sorrell: 50–60%; 60–70%; 70–80%; 80–90%; >90%; Cooke: 50–60%; 60–70%; 70–80%; 80–90%; >90%; Tie: 50%; No votes

Republican primary runoff results
Party	Candidate	Votes	%
Republican	Andrew Sorrell	205,006	57.45%
Republican	Stan Cooke	151,815	42.55%
Total votes		356,821	100%

== Libertarian convention ==
No primary was held for the Libertarian Party, and the party instead nominated candidates.

=== Nominee ===
- Leigh LaChine, environmental consultant.

== General election ==
2022 Alabama State Auditor election
Party	Candidate	Votes	%
Republican	Andrew Sorrell	947,266	85.03%
Libertarian	Leigh LaChine	166,760	14.97%
Total votes		1,114,026	100%
Republican hold			

== See also ==
- 2022 Alabama elections
