= Melissa Capps =

American politician

Auditor of Oklahoma
- Elect
- Assuming office January 2027
- Succeeding: Cindy Byrd

Personal details
- Born: 1973 or 1974 (age 52–53)
- Party: Republican
- Education: University of Central Oklahoma (BBA)

Melissa Capps (born 1973/1974) is an American politician who is the Oklahoma State Auditor and Inspector-elect since April 2026. She is a member of the Republican Party.

Political offices
Preceded by Cindy Byrd	Auditor of Oklahoma; Taking office 2027	Elect
