= Idaho state controller =

Idaho State Controller
- Incumbent; Brandon Woolf since October 15, 2012
- First holder: Silas W. Moody
- Website: www.sco.idaho.gov/web/scoweb.nsf

The State Controller of Idaho is a constitutional officer in the executive branch of government of the U.S. state of Idaho. Twenty-one individuals have held the office of state controller or its predecessor office of state auditor since statehood. The incumbent is Brandon Woolf, a Republican.

== Powers and duties ==
The state controller supervises and manages Idaho's fiscal affairs as its chief fiscal officer. As such, the state controller establishes statewide internal pre-audit accounting controls to assure state funds are spent properly, maintains the state's centralized financial management and accounting systems, administers payroll, and pays claims against the state. The state controller also prepares the annual comprehensive financial report of the state of Idaho, operates the Computer Service Center for the whole of state government, and serves as officio secretary of the State Board of Examiners, which examines all claims against the state outside of regular business operations. In addition, the state controller sits on the following boards by virtue of office:

- College Savings Program Board: Provides families with an affordable way to save for college under a 529 college savings plan.
- Deferred Compensation Board: Implements and maintains a deferred compensation program for state employees.
- Information Technology Authority: Reviews and evaluates information technology policies and systems for state agencies.
- State Board of Canvassers: Canvasses and certifies election results.
- State Board of Land Commissioners: Directs and supervises the management of Idaho's public endowment lands that benefit public schools and institutions.

The state controller should not be confused with the separately elected state treasurer, who serves as Idaho's chief banker and investment officer.

== Divisions ==
The state controller is supported by a professional staff organized into four divisions: the Division of Administrative Operations, the Division of Statewide Accounting, the Computer Services Center, and the Division of Statewide Payroll.

=== Division of Administrative Operations ===
The Division of Administrative Operations is responsible for managing the budget, accounts, facilities and human resources of the State Controller's Office. The division also:

- Provides public information services.
- Oversees statewide Business Intelligence Program (IBIS).
- Supports the state controller in his or her various board memberships.

=== Division of Statewide Accounting ===
The Division of Statewide Accounting is responsible for authorizing and validating state payments against an agency's available cash and appropriation before allowing a payment to be generated. To this end, the division:

- Generates state warrants, which are used like checks to pay state employees and other state business obligations
- Maintains the Statewide Accounting and Reporting System (STARS).
- Prepares statewide financial reports, including the annual comprehensive financial report, popular financial report, and legal basis report.
- Implements statewide accounting standards, which conform to generally accepted accounting principles (GAAP).
- Coordinates 1099 MISC filing for state agencies

=== Computer Services Center ===
As a division of the State Controller's Office, the Computer Services Center provides application development, support and other technical services as a central service provider, operates the state's largest mainframe computer and data center, and assists state agencies with technical data processing.

=== Division of Statewide Payroll ===
The Division of Statewide Payroll pays and maintains payroll records for approximately 25,000 state employees, conducts payroll training conferences for government employees, and administers garnishment processing, tax reporting, and electronic fund transfers with vendors.

== Office holders ==
Idaho state controllers
| Officeholder | Party | Assumed office | Left office |
|---|---|---|---|
| Silas W. Moody | Republican | 1/5/1891 | 1/2/1893 |
| Frank C. Ramsey | Republican | 1/2/1893 | 1/7/1897 |
| J.H. Anderson | P-D | 1/7/1897 | 7/2/1899 |
| Bartlett Sinclair | | 1/7/1899 | 1/7/1901 |
| E.W. Jones | P-D-S.R. | 1/7/1901 | 1/5/1903 |
| Theo Turner | Republican | 1/5/1903 | 1/3/1905 |
| Robert S. Bragaw | | 1/2/1905 | 1/4/1909 |
| S.D. Taylor | Republican | 1/4/1909 | 1/6/1913 |
| Fred L. Huston | Republican | 1/6/1913 | 1/1/1917 |
| Clarence Van Deusen | Democratic | 1/1/1917 | 1/6/1919 |
| Edward G. Gallett | Republican | 1/6/1919 | 1/2/1933 |
| Harry C. Parsons | Democratic | 1/2/1933 | 1/2/1939 |
| Calvin E. Wright | Democratic | 1/2/1939 | 1/1/1945 |
| Ernest G. Hansen | Democratic | 1/1/1945 | 1/6/1947 |
| N.P. Nielson | Republican | 1/6/1947 | 4/30/1957 (died in office) |
| Rulon Swensen | Republican | 6/18/1957 (appointed to fill vacancy) | 1/5/1959 |
| Joe R. Williams | Democratic | 1/5/1959 | 2/28/1989 (resigned) |
| J.D. Williams | Democratic | 3/1/1989 (appointed to fill vacancy then elected) | 09/30/2002 |
| Keith Johnson | Republican | 10/1/2002 (appointed to fill vacancy then elected) | 1/1/2007 |
| Donna Jones | Republican | 1/2/2007 | 9/15/2012 |
| Brandon Woolf | Republican | 9/15/2012 | present |
