= Cindy Byrd =

American accountant and politician

Oklahoma State Treasurer-elect
- Assuming office January 2027
- Governor: Mike Mazzei (elect)
- Succeeding: Todd Russ

Auditor of Oklahoma
- In office January 14, 2019 – January 2027
- Governor: Kevin Stitt
- Preceded by: Gary Jones
- Succeeded by: Melissa Capps

Personal details
- Born: Cynthia Perry; January 18, 1973 (age 53) Coalgate, Oklahoma, U.S.
- Party: Republican
- Education: East Central University (BS)

Cynthia D. Byrd (née Perry; born January 18, 1973) is an American accountant and politician who is the Oklahoma State Treasurer-elect. She is currently serving as the Oklahoma State Auditor and Inspector since January 2019.

Byrd is from Coalgate, Oklahoma. She graduated from East Central University in 1997, earning a Bachelor of Science in accounting. In 2003, she became a certified public accountant. In January 2013, Byrd became the deputy state auditor under Gary Jones. She was elected Oklahoma State Auditor in the 2018 elections. She was reelected to a second term in the 2022 elections.

== Early life and career ==
Byrd was born and raised in Coalgate, Oklahoma the daughter of Archie and Mary Eddings. In 1991, she graduated from Coalgate High School and went on to attend East Central University. She graduated with a Bachelor of Science in Accounting in 1996.

In January 1997, Byrd started working for the Oklahoma State Auditor's office and in 2003 she became a certified public accountant. In January 2013, she was promoted to Deputy State Auditor.

== State auditor ==
=== 2018 campaign ===
Cindy Byrd received 49.5% of the vote on the primary held on June 26, 2018. Byrd advanced to the runoff with Charlie Prater. On the runoff held on August 28, 2018 Byrd defeated Prater with 50.2% of the vote. She moved on to the general election where she faced Libertarian candidate, John Yeutter. Byrd received the most votes for a state official in Oklahoma in history, with 818,851 votes. The election also made her the first woman to hold this office in Oklahoma's history.

=== First term ===
- On March 6, 2019 Governor Kevin Stitt sent a letter requesting Byrd audit the Oklahoma Health Care Authority (OHCA). The OHCA is already audited annually by the State Auditor's office.
- On September 20, 2019, the Oklahoma State Board of Education requested Byrd's office audit Seeworth Academy, an Oklahoma City alternative school for at-risk youth. Oklahoma District Attorney David Prater requested access to the audit for potential criminal charges. The Audit was released in November 2021 and found more than $250,000 in “misappropriated” spending and Prater convened a grand jury to examine public corruption at the school.
- In January 2020, Byrd's office opened an audit of Wetumka, Oklahoma after City Manager Donnie Jett and Mayor James Jackson were forced to resign for being under FBI investigation.
- In April 2020, Byrd's office released an audit of Circuit Engineering District 7 and County Energy District Authority finding they were not statutorily authorized to open an asphalt emulsion plant, they did not abide financial agreements regarding a $2.3 million loan, and that the venture was not properly reviewed by the board.
- In December 2020, Byrd's office announced an audit of Pauls Valley, Oklahoma after 317 valid signatures requesting the audit were submitted.
- In July 2021, Byrd's office launched an audit of Western Heights Public Schools in Oklahoma City at the request of the State Board of Education and a 998 signature citizens petition. When the State Board of Education took over the district, 15 bags of shredded documents were found in the administrative buildings dumpster.
- In September 2021, Governor Kevin Stitt requested an audit of the Oklahoma State Department of Education.

==== Epic Charter Schools audit ====
In July 2019, Governor Kevin Stitt and State Superintendent Joy Hofmeister ordered an audit of Epic Charter Schools. In February 2020, Byrd's office subpoenaed Epic Youth Services and in March she sought court orders to comply with the subpoenas. In October, Byrd's office released an audit of Epic Charter School finding the school owed the state $8.9 million and summarized the audit with the remarks “We cannot determine if [Epic Charter Schools] is entitled to the $80 million they received." In December, a second investigation found Epic Charter Schools incorrectly classified as much as $9.73 million. Mike Cantrell resigned from Epic Charter Schools board and was replaced by J.P. Franklin in January 2021 during the investigation. Later in May, Epic Charter Schools cancelled their contract with Epic Youth Services, owned by the schools co-founders Ben Harris and David Chaney. Board member Betsy Brown, J.P. Franklin and Doug Scott were also forced to resign. This was done so Epic Charter Schools could keep their state virtual charter certification after Epic Youth Services refused to cooperate with the audit.

In February 2022, Attorney General John M. O'Connor announced that Oklahoma County District Attorney David Prater would investigate and prosecute any criminal case regarding the Epic Charter Schools investigation. On June 23, 2022, the Oklahoma State Bureau of Investigation arrested Epic co-founders Ben Harris and David Chaney and former CFO Josh Brock. They were charged with racketeering, embezzlement, obtaining money by false pretense, conspiracy to commit a felony, violation of the Computer Crimes Act, submitting false documents to the state, and unlawful proceeds.

==== Oklahoma State Department of Health audit ====
In April 2020, Byrd's office opened an audit into the Oklahoma State Department of Health on the request of Attorney General Mike Hunter. The audit was completed and turned into the Attorney General's office on May 21, 2021, however, five days later Attorney General Mike Hunter resigned. Hunter's replacement, John M. O'Connor decided not to release the audit. On February 9, 2022, Byrd's office released the audit without notifying the Attorney General's office. Byrd stated "I believe all public records should be open and easily accessible to the taxpayers, this audit is an inspection of existing public records. Consequently, my final audit report is neither confidential nor exempt from the Open Records Act. I feel compelled, both legally and ethically, to release the full audit report to the public. Oklahoma taxpayers paid for it — they should get to see it.” The audit found during the COVID-19 pandemic prepayments were made in violation of the Oklahoma Constitution and $5.4 million in goods have still not been received.

=== 2022 campaign ===
In the 2022 Oklahoma elections, Byrd ran for reelection against a Republican primary challenge by Steven McQuillen. Political action committees spent thousands of dollars in Pro-McQuillen or Anti-Byrd ads. Some of the ads attacking Byrd were linked to the Epic Charter Schools co-founders David Chaney and Ben Harris. Byrd defeated McQuillen in the primary election on June 28 and since no other party's candidate filed for the race she was reelected by the Republican primary.

== 2026 campaigns ==
In January 2025, Byrd filed to run for Lieutenant Governor of Oklahoma to succeed the term limited incumbent Matt Pinnell. She later withdrew from the Lieutenant Governor's race and instead filed for the 2026 Oklahoma State Treasurer election. She won the November general election.

== Personal life ==
She married Steve Byrd, also a native of Coalgate, on July 26, 2014. The couple continue to consider Coalgate as their home.

Party political offices
Preceded by Gary Jones	Republican nominee for Auditor of Oklahoma; 2018, 2022	Succeeded by Melissa Capps
Political offices
Preceded by Gary Jones	Auditor of Oklahoma; 2019–present	Incumbent
