= 2022 New Mexico State Auditor election =

- November 8, 2022
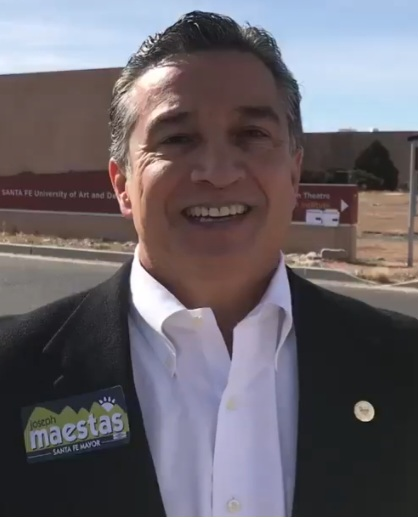

Nominee	Joseph Maestas	Travis Sanchez
Party	Democratic	Libertarian
Popular vote	399,810	245,725
Percentage	61.93%	38.07%
- Maestas: 50–60% 60–70% 70–80% 80–90% >90% Sanchez: 50–60% 60–70% 70–80% 80–90% >90% Tie: 50% No votes
State Auditor before election
Brian Colón
Democratic
Elected State Auditor
Joseph Maestas
Democratic

The 2022 New Mexico State Auditor election took place on November 8, 2022, to elect the next New Mexico State Auditor. Incumbent Democratic Auditor Brian Colón did not seek re-election, and instead opted to unsuccessfully run for Attorney General of New Mexico.

== Democratic primary ==
=== Candidates ===
==== Nominee ====
- Joseph Maestas, chairman of the New Mexico Public Regulation Commission (2021–present) and former mayor of Española (2006–2010)

==== Eliminated in primary ====
- Zackary Quintero, state ombudsmen and candidate for Albuquerque City Council in 2019

=== Results ===
Results by county Maestas: 50–60%; 60–70%; 70–80%; 80–90%; Quintero: 50–60%

Democratic primary results
Party	Candidate	Votes	%
Democratic	Joseph Maestas	74,701	57.27%
Democratic	Zackary Quintero	55,732	42.73%
Total votes		130,433	100.0%

== Libertarian primary ==
Vaillancourt received enough write-in votes to advance to the general election as the Libertarian nominee. However, Vaillancourt withdrew and was replaced on the ballot by Travis Sanchez, the Libertarian nominee for New Mexico Lieutenant Governor.

=== Candidates ===
==== Nominee ====
- Travis Sanchez, territory manager

==== Withdrawn ====
- Robert Vaillancourt

=== Results ===
Libertarian primary results
Party	Candidate	Votes	%
Libertarian	Robert Vaillancourt (write-in)	284	100.0%
Total votes		284	100.0%

== General election ==
=== Results ===
County Flips: Democratic Hold / Libertarian Flip from Republican

2022 New Mexico State Auditor election
Party	Candidate	Votes	%	±%
Democratic	Joseph Maestas	399,810	61.93%	+4.37%
Libertarian	Travis Sanchez	245,725	38.07%	N/A
Total votes		645,535	100.0%	
Democratic hold				

==== By county ====
County	Joseph Maestas Democratic		Travis Sanchez Libertarian		Margin		Total votes cast
County	#	%	#	%	#	%	Total votes cast
Bernalillo	148,759	67.34%	72,144	32.66%	76,615	34.68%	220,903
Catron	541	31.42%	1,181	68.58%	-640	-37.17%	1,722
Chaves	5,402	37.36%	9,058	62.64%	-3,656	-25.28%	14,460
Cibola	3,987	63.84%	2,258	36.16%	1,729	27.69%	6,245
Colfax	2,472	55.79%	1,959	44.21%	513	11.58%	4,431
Curry	3,046	33.81%	5,964	66.19%	-2,918	-32.39%	9,010
De Baca	238	39.53%	364	60.47%	-126	-20.93%	602
Doña Ana	33,369	62.82%	19,748	37.18%	13,621	25.64%	53,117
Eddy	4,910	34.14%	9,473	65.86%	-4,563	-31.72%	14,383
Grant	6,888	65.01%	3,708	34.99%	3,180	30.01%	10,596
Guadalupe	1,118	71.76%	440	28.24%	678	43.52%	1,558
Harding	160	47.48%	177	52.52%	-17	-5.04%	337
Hidalgo	730	53.36%	638	46.64%	92	6.73%	1,368
Lea	3,155	26.74%	8,643	73.26%	-5,488	-46.52%	11,798
Lincoln	2,684	36.04%	4,763	63.96%	-2,079	-27.92%	7,447
Los Alamos	6,271	66.78%	3,120	33.22%	3,151	33.55%	9,391
Luna	2,839	53.34%	2,483	46.66%	356	6.69%	5,322
McKinley	12,905	72.22%	4,965	27.78%	7,940	44.43%	17,870
Mora	1,662	75.07%	552	24.93%	1,110	50.14%	2,214
Otero	6,633	42.04%	9,144	57.96%	-2,511	-15.92%	15,777
Quay	1,035	39.73%	1,570	60.27%	-535	-20.54%	2,605
Rio Arriba	9,561	79.60%	2,450	20.40%	7,111	59.20%	12,011
Roosevelt	1,372	33.16%	2,765	66.84%	-1,393	-33.67%	4,137
San Juan	15,024	42.64%	20,208	57.36%	-5,184	-14.71%	35,232
San Miguel	6,946	78.34%	1,920	21.66%	5,026	56.69%	8,866
Sandoval	33,896	60.49%	22,139	39.51%	11,757	20.98%	56,035
Santa Fe	53,592	80.96%	12,606	19.04%	40,986	61.91%	66,198
Sierra	2,078	47.31%	2,314	52.69%	-236	-5.37%	4,392
Socorro	3,345	60.83%	2,154	39.17%	1,191	21.66%	5,499
Taos	10,559	83.35%	2,110	16.65%	8,449	66.69%	12,669
Torrance	2,021	40.95%	2,914	59.05%	-893	-18.10%	4,935
Union	429	34.27%	823	65.73%	-394	-31.47%	1,252
Valencia	12,183	52.62%	10,970	47.38%	1,213	5.24%	23,153
Totals	399,810	61.93%	245,725	38.07%	154,085	23.87%	645,535

Counties that flipped from Republican to Libertarian

- San Juan (largest city: Farmington)
- Catron (largest city: Reserve)
- Lincoln (largest city: Roidoso)
- Otero (largest city: Alamogordo)
- Sierra (largest city: Truth or Consequences)
- Torrance (largest city: Moriarty)
- Chaves (largest village: Roswell)
- Eddy (largest city: Carlsbad)
- De Baca (largest city: Fort Sumner)
- Curry (largest village: Clovis)
- Harding (largest city: Roy)
- Lea (largest city: Hobbs)
- Quay (largest city: Tucumcari)
- Roosevelt (largest city: Portales)
- Union (largest city: Clayton)

==== By congressional district ====
Maestas won all three congressional districts.

District	Maestas	Sanchez	Representative
1st	63%	37%	Melanie Stansbury
2nd	59%	41%	Yvette Herrell (117th Congress)
2nd	59%	41%	Gabe Vasquez (118th Congress)
3rd	63%	37%	Teresa Leger Fernandez
