= Andy Matthews =

American politician

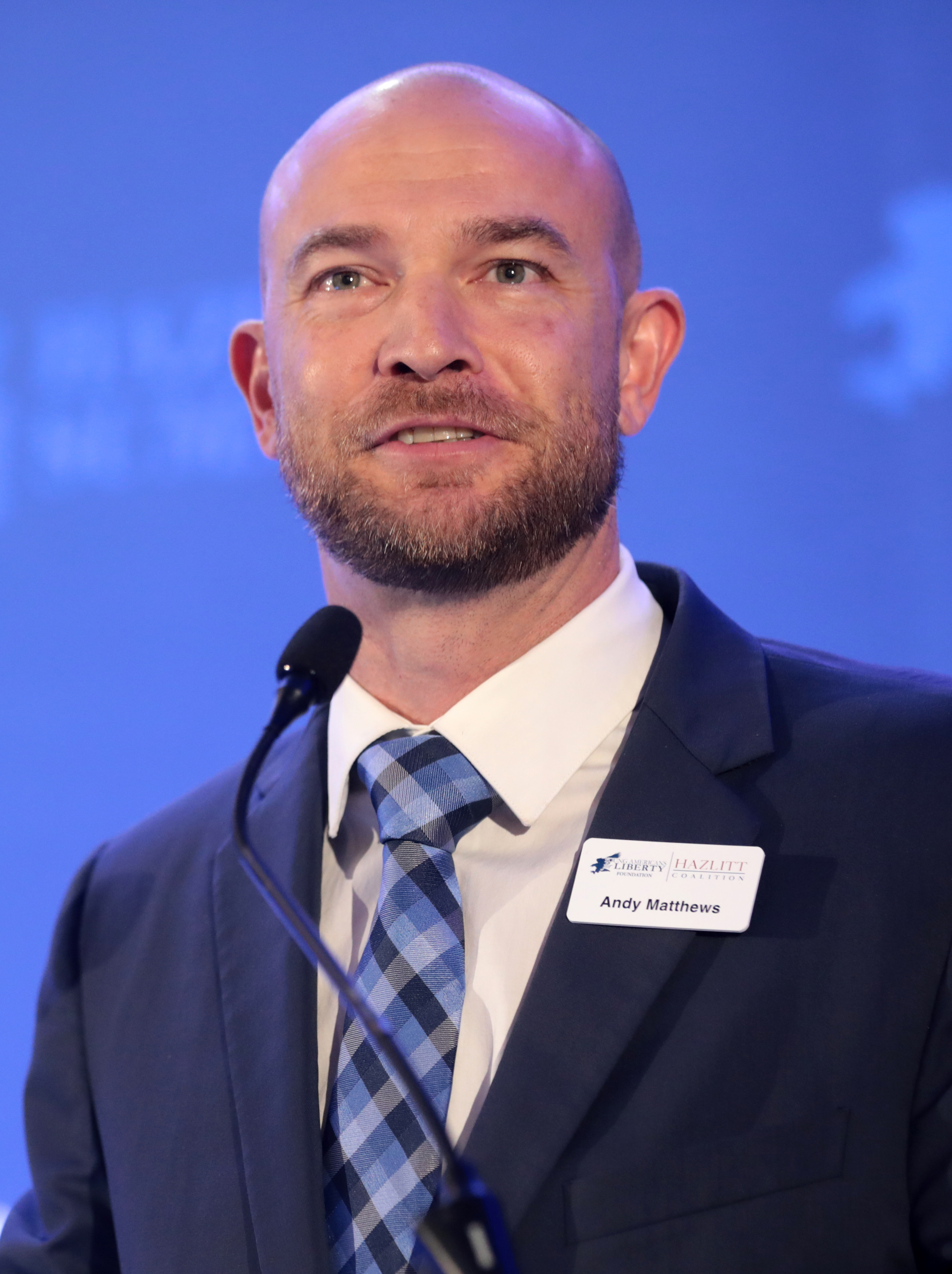
- Matthews in 2022

23rd Controller of Nevada
- Incumbent
- Assumed office January 2, 2023
- Governor: Joe Lombardo
- Preceded by: Catherine Byrne

Member of the Nevada Assembly from the 37th district
- In office November 4, 2020 – November 9, 2022
- Preceded by: Shea Backus
- Succeeded by: Shea Backus

Personal details
- Born: Andrew Thomas Matthews; 1978 (age 47–48) New Bedford, Massachusetts, U.S.
- Party: Republican
- Education: Boston University (BA)
- Website: Campaign website

Andrew Thomas Matthews (born 1978) is an American politician serving as the 23rd controller of Nevada since 2023. A member of the Republican Party, he previously served as a member of the Nevada Assembly representing Nevada's 37th district.

== Education and career ==
A graduate of Boston University, Matthews briefly worked as a sports writer before entering politics in 2005 as a campaign worker in New Jersey. Matthews has worked for the conservative Nevada Policy Research Institute since 2007, starting as the communications director and ultimately becoming president.

He was elected to the Nevada Assembly in 2020 after defeating incumbent Democrat Shea Backus, thus flipping the seat from Democratic to Republican. He previously ran for a seat in the United States House of Representatives in Nevada, but came in fourth in the 2016 Republican primary, finishing behind the winner Danny Tarkanian, as well as second place finisher Michael Roberson, and third place finisher Michele Fiore. He was then hired as executive director of a conservative PAC tied to former Nevada Attorney General Adam Laxalt.

In 2018, Matthews worked for Adam Laxalt's campaign for Governor of Nevada, but Laxalt was defeated by Democrat Steve Sisolak, and Matthews then successfully ran for the Nevada Assembly in the 2020 election. In 2022, Matthews chose not to run for reelection to the Assembly and instead entered the race for Nevada State Controller. He was unopposed in the Republican primary, and faced Democrat Ellen Spiegel in the November general election. Matthews won the election with 50.06% of the vote. In the 2026 Nevada State Controller election, Andy Matthews ran for re-election, but would lose against Democratic challenger Michael MacDougall. This was concurrent with various other Democratic gains across state offices in Nevada.

Political offices
| Preceded by Catherine Byrne | Controller of Nevada; 2023–present | Incumbent |
