= Wyoming State Auditor =

State Auditor of the State of Wyoming
- Seal of Wyoming
- Incumbent; Kristi Racines since 2019
- Style: Her Honor
- Term length: Four years
- Formation: 1890
- Website: sao.wyo.gov

The Wyoming State Auditor is a statewide elected office in Wyoming and serves as the chief accountant and payroll officer for the state. The Auditor, who elected to a 4-year term, protects public money by ensuring that it is properly accounted for in the most efficient and cost effective means at all times. Promoting transparency and financial accountability are the top priorities. The predecessor of the position was the Wyoming Territory Auditor. Wyoming has had a state auditor since achieving statehood in 1890. The current Auditors is Republican Kristi Racines, who assumed office in January 2019.

== List of Auditors of the Wyoming territory ==
#	Image	Name	Term	Party
1		Benjamin Gallagher	1869–1870	Democratic
2		James H. Hayford	1870–1875	Republican
3		Orlando North	1875–1877	Republican
4		Stephen W. Downey	1877–1879	Republican
5		J. S. Nason	1879–1882	Republican
6		Jesse Knight	1882–1884	Republican
7		Perry L. Smith	1884–1886	Republican
8		Mortimer N. Grant	1886–1890	Republican

== List of State Auditors of Wyoming ==
#	Image	Auditor	Term	Party
1		C.W. Burdick	1890–1895	Republican
2		William O. Owen	1895–1899	Republican
3		Leroy Grant	1899–1911	Republican
4		Robert B. Forsyth	1911–1919	Republican
5		Ishmael C. Jefferis	1919–1923	Republican
6		Vincent Carter	1923–1929	Republican
7		Roscoe Alcorn	1929–1935	Republican
8		William M. Jack	1935–1944	Democratic
9		Carl Robinson	1944	Democratic
10		John J. McIntyre	1944–1947	Democratic
11		Everett T. Copenhaver	1947–1955	Republican
12		Minnie A. Mitchell	1955–1967	Republican
13		Everett T. Copenhaver	1967–1973	Republican
14		Edwin J. Witzenburger	1973–1975	Republican
15		James B. Griffith	1975–1987	Republican
16		Jack Sidi	1987–1991	Republican
17		Dave Ferrari	1991–1999	Republican
18		Max Maxfield	1999–2007	Republican
19		Rita Meyer	2007–2010	Republican
20		Cynthia Cloud	2011–2019	Republican
21		Kristi Racines	2019–present	Republican
