= Brandon Woolf =

American politician (born 1972)

21st Controller of Idaho
- Incumbent
- Assumed office October 15, 2012
- Governor: Butch Otter; Brad Little
- Preceded by: Donna Jones

Personal details
- Born: 1972 (age 53–54) Logan, Utah, U.S.
- Party: Republican
- Spouse: Janalee Balls (m. 1994)
- Education: Utah State University (BA); Boise State University (MBA)

Brandon D. Woolf is an American politician. A Republican, he is serving as Idaho's 21st State Controller.

== Biography ==
Woolf, a sixth generation Idahoan, was born in 1972 to Dennis and Liz Woolf of Whitney, Idaho, the oldest of five children.

Woolf graduated from Preston High School (Idaho) in 1991, and then served a two-year church mission in Antwerp, Belgium He graduated cum laude from Utah State University in 1997 with a Bachelor of Arts in Political Science. In 2006, while working full-time at the Idaho State Controller's Office, he earned a Master of Business Administration from Boise State University.

Woolf is a member of the Church of Jesus Christ of Latter-day Saints. Since March 8, 2026, he has served as a stake presidency counselor for the Boise Idaho Young Single Adult Stake.

== Career ==
After graduating from Utah State University he interned at the Idaho State Controller's Office, starting in 1997, and rose through the ranks serving as a training specialist, bureau chief, and division administrator over statewide payroll. In 2011, he was appointed chief of staff for former State Controller Donna M. Jones.

Following Jones’ automobile accident in May 2012, Governor Butch Otter, at her recommendation, appointed him temporary acting State Controller. Following Jones' retirement on October 15, 2012, Woolf was appointed permanent State Controller to serve the remainder of her term, which expired January 2015.

== Electoral history ==
Idaho State Controller Republican primary election, 2014
Party	Candidate	Votes	%
Republican	Brandon Woolf (inc.)	68,609	50.9
Republican	Todd Hatfield	66,126	49.1

Idaho State Controller general election, 2014
Party	Candidate	Votes	%
Republican	Brandon Woolf (inc.)	342,013	100.0

Idaho State Controller general election, 2018
Party	Candidate	Votes	%
Republican	Brandon Woolf	465,105	100.0

Idaho State Controller general election, 2022
Party	Candidate	Votes	%
Republican	Brandon Woolf	405,075	69.5
Democrat	Dianna David	156,232	26.8
Constitution Party	Miste Gardner	21,298	3.7

Political offices
Preceded by Donna Jones	Controller of Idaho; 2012–present	Incumbent
