= Kristi Racines =

American politician

21st Auditor of Wyoming
- Incumbent
- Assumed office January 7, 2019
- Governor: Mark Gordon
- Preceded by: Cynthia Cloud

Personal details
- Born: 1983 or 1984 (age 42–43) Casper, Wyoming, U.S.
- Party: Republican
- Education: University of Wyoming (BA)

Kristi Racines (born c. 1983) is an American politician. A member of the Republican Party, she is currently serving as the 21st Wyoming State Auditor.

== Early life and career ==
Racines was born in Casper, Wyoming, and was raised in Riverton. She graduated from the University of Wyoming with a bachelor's degree in accounting and Spanish. She is a certified public accountant and worked as the chief financial officer and director of human resources for the Wyoming Supreme Court Office of Court Administration, responsible for managing an $80 million budget.

== Wyoming State Auditor ==
In the 2018 elections, Racines ran for Wyoming State Auditor. She defeated Nathan Winters in the primary election, and won the general election. She was sworn into office on January 7, 2019. Racines ran for reelection in the 2022 elections, and won a second term without opposition. She won a third term in 2026 without opposition.

== Personal life ==
Racines and her husband have two children and live in Cheyenne, Wyoming.

Political offices
Preceded by Cynthia Cloud	Auditor of Wyoming; 2019–present	Incumbent
