= Joseph Maestas =

American politician and engineer

Joe Maestas
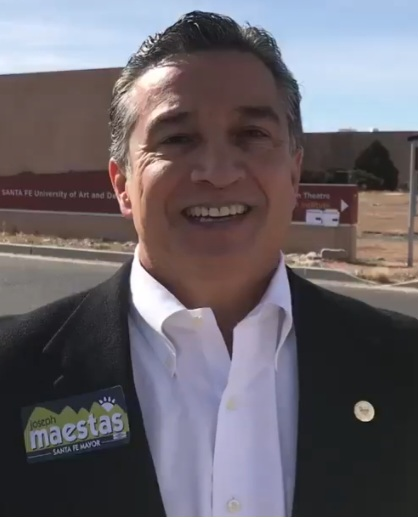

29th Auditor of New Mexico
- Incumbent
- Assumed office January 1, 2023
- Governor: Michelle Lujan Grisham; Deb Haaland (elect)
- Preceded by: Brian Colón

Member of the New Mexico Public Regulation Commission from the 3rd district
- In office January 1, 2021 – January 1, 2023
- Governor: Michelle Lujan Grisham
- Preceded by: Valerie Espinoza
- Succeeded by: Seat abolished

Personal details
- Born: 1960 or 1961 (age 65–66) Santa Fe, New Mexico, U.S.
- Party: Democratic
- Education: University of New Mexico (BS); Arizona State University, Tempe (MS)

Joseph M. Maestas (born 1960/1961) is an American politician and engineer who is the current Auditor of New Mexico. He previously served as a member of the New Mexico Public Regulation Commission. Elected in 2020, he assumed office on January 1, 2021, succeeding Valerie Espinoza. He announced his candidacy for State Auditor on July 19, 2021. He was elected in 2022 and assumed office in January 2023, succeeding Brian Colón.

== Early life and education ==
Maestas was born in Santa Fe, New Mexico and raised on a farm in Santa Cruz, New Mexico. He earned a Bachelor of Science from the University of New Mexico and a Master of Science from Arizona State University, Tempe, both in civil engineering.

== Career ==
For over 30 years, Maestas has worked as an engineer and government regulator. In 2014, he was elected to serve as a member of the Santa Fe City Council for the second district. From 2006 to 2010, he was the mayor of Española, New Mexico. Maestas was also a candidate for mayor of Santa Fe in 2018, losing to Alan Webber.

In the 2020 election, Maestas was a candidate for the third district on the New Mexico Public Regulation Commission. He defeated Brian Harris in the Democratic primary and Libertarian nominee Chris Luchini in the November general election. He assumed office on January 1, 2021.

In 2022, he was elected New Mexico state auditor. He started his four-year term on January 1, 2023.

Political offices
Preceded by Brian Colón	Auditor of New Mexico; 2023–present	Incumbent
