= 2016–17 FC Barcelona Bàsquet season =

Spanish basketball club season

FC Barcelona Lassa
2016–17 season
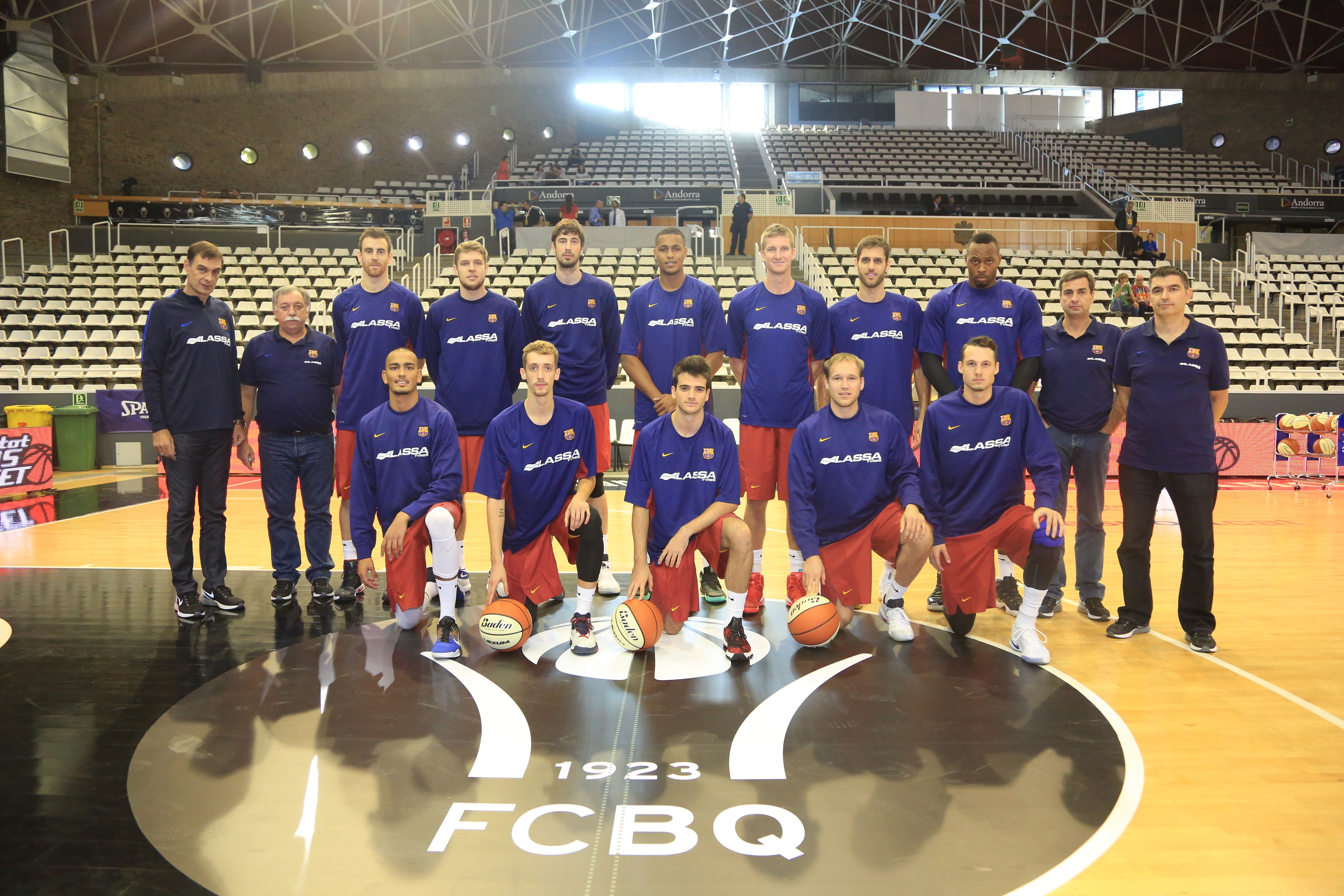
- Barcelona roster in September 2016
- Chairman: Josep Maria Bartomeu
- Head coach: Georgios Bartzokas
- Arena: Palau Blaugrana
- Liga ACB: 6th
- Playoffs: Quarterfinals
- EuroLeague: 11th
- Copa del Rey: Semifinalist
- Supercopa de España: Runners-up
- Highest home attendance: 7,013 vs Real Madrid (18 November 2016)
- Lowest home attendance: 3,037 vs Maccabi Tel Aviv (30 March 2017)
- Average home attendance: 4,931 (in EuroLeague); 4,272 (in Liga ACB)
- Biggest win: 102–65 vs MoraBanc Andorra (26 March 2017)
- Biggest defeat: 63–102 vs Real Madrid (18 November 2016)
Home	Away

The 2016–17 season was FC Barcelona Lassa's 91st in existence and the club's 34th consecutive season in the top flight of Spanish basketball and the 17th consecutive season in the top flight of European basketball. Barcelona is involved in four competitions.

== Players ==
=== Squad information ===
Note: Flags indicate national team eligibility at FIBA-sanctioned events. Players may hold other non-FIBA nationalities not displayed.

FC Barcelona Lassa roster
Players
Coaches

Pos.	No.	Nat.	Name	Ht.	Wt.	Age
F	10	(Spain)	Claver, Víctor	2.06 m (6 ft 9 in)	102 kg (225 lb)	28 – 30 August 1988
C	21	(Senegal)	Diagne, Moussa	2.11 m (6 ft 11 in)	103 kg (227 lb)	23 – 6 March 1994
PF	5	(Kosovo)	Doellman, Justin	2.08 m (6 ft 10 in)	102 kg (225 lb)	32 – 3 February 1985
G/F	20	(Sweden)	Eriksson, Marcus	2.01 m (6 ft 7 in)	94 kg (207 lb)	23 – 5 December 1993
G	25	(Finland)	Koponen, Petteri	1.94 m (6 ft 4 in)	88 kg (194 lb)	29 – 13 April 1988
PG	1	(United States)	Munford, Xavier	1.93 m (6 ft 4 in)	78 kg (172 lb)	24 – 1 June 1992
SG	11	(Spain)	Navarro, Juan Carlos (C)	1.92 m (6 ft 4 in)	90.5 kg (200 lb)	36 – 13 June 1980
SG	24	(United States)	Oleson, Brad	1.91 m (6 ft 3 in)	90.5 kg (200 lb)	34 – 11 April 1983
PG	16	(Serbia)	Peno, Stefan	1.98 m (6 ft 6 in)	91 kg (201 lb)	19 – 3 August 1997
SF	33	(Greece)	Perperoglou, Stratos	2.03 m (6 ft 8 in)	104 kg (229 lb)	32 – 7 August 1984
CG	32	(Bosnia and Herzegovina)	Renfroe, Alex	1.91 m (6 ft 3 in)	79 kg (174 lb)	31 – 23 May 1986
SG	8	(Spain)	Ribas, Pau	1.96 m (6 ft 5 in)	95 kg (209 lb)	30 – 2 March 1987
PG	2	(Montenegro)	Rice, Tyrese	1.85 m (6 ft 1 in)	86 kg (190 lb)	30 – 15 May 1987
C	44	(Croatia)	Tomić, Ante	2.18 m (7 ft 2 in)	120 kg (265 lb)	30 – 17 February 1987
F	14	(Bulgaria)	Vezenkov, Sasha	2.06 m (6 ft 9 in)	102 kg (225 lb)	21 – 6 August 1995

Head coach

- (Greece) Georgios Bartzokas

Assistant coach(es)

- (Greece) Christos Pappas
- (Spain) Josep Maria Berrocal
- (Croatia) Pino Grdović

Legend

- (C) Team captain
- Injured

- Roster
Updated: 18-9-2025

=== Players in ===
No.	Pos.	Nat.	Name	Age	Moving from		Type	Ends	Transfer fee	Date	Source
10	PF	(Spain)	Víctor Claver	27	Lokomotiv Kuban	(Russia)	Agreement with Valencia Basket	2019	€2,000,000	20 July 2016	
2	PG	(Montenegro)	Tyrese Rice	29	Khimki	(Russia)	Transfer	2018	Undisclosed	26 July 2016	
25	G	(Finland)	Petteri Koponen	28	Khimki	(Russia)	Transfer	2019	Undisclosed	16 August 2016	
3	PF	(United States)	Jonathan Holmes	23	Cleveland Cavaliers	(United States)	Contract terminated	2017	Free	4 November 2016	
13	F/C	(Brazil)	Vítor Faverani	28	UCAM Murcia	(Spain)	Transfer	2018	€250,000	15 January 2017	
21	C	(Senegal)	Moussa Diagne	22	Montakit Fuenlabrada	(Spain)	Back from loan	2018	Free	22 January 2017	
1	PG	(United States)	Xavier Munford	24	Greensboro Swarm	(United States)	Transfer	2017	Undisclosed	3 February 2017	

Total spending: ▼€2,250,000

=== Players out ===
No.	Pos.	Nat.	Name	Age	Moving to		Type	Transfer fee	Date	Source
13	PG	(Czech Republic)	Tomáš Satoranský	24	Washington Wizards	(United States)	Contract terminated	Undisclosed	4 July 2016	
10	SF	(Spain)	Álex Abrines	22	Oklahoma City Thunder	(United States)	Contract terminated	€2,000,000	19 July 2016	
21	C	(Senegal)	Moussa Diagne	22	Montakit Fuenlabrada	(Spain)	Loan	Free	4 August 2016	
23	C	(Jamaica)	Samardo Samuels	27	Jiangsu Dragons	(China)	Contract terminated	Undisclosed	16 August 2016	
30	PG	(Puerto Rico)	Carlos Arroyo	36	Leones de Ponce	(Puerto Rico)	End of contract	Free	16 December 2016	
3	PF	(United States)	Jonathan Holmes	24	Canton Charge	(United States)	End of contract	Free	7 January 2017	
6	C	(United States)	Joey Dorsey	33	Free agent		Contract terminated	Free	18 January 2017	
28	C	(Brazil)	Wesley Sena	20	Free agent		Contract terminated	Undisclosed	3 February 2017	
13	F/C	(Brazil)	Vítor Faverani	28	Free agent		Parted ways	Undisclosed	18 May 2017	

Total income: ▲€2,000,000

Total expenditure: ▼€250,000

== Club ==
=== Technical staff ===
Position	Staff
Head coach	Georgios Bartzokas
Assistant coaches	Christos Pappas; Josep Maria Berrocal; Pino Grdovic
Team delegate	Xavier Montolio
Doctor	Xavier Valle
Physiotherapists	Carles Martín; David Urbano
Massage therapist	Eduard Torrent
Equipment manager	Miquel Font

Source: FC Barcelona Lassa

=== Kit ===
Supplier: Nike / Sponsor: Lassa Tyres

Home	Away

== Pre-season and friendlies ==
Win Loss

2 September 2016 1	FC Barcelona Lassa (Spain)	88–80	(Spain) Real Betis Energía Plus	Sant Julià de Vilatorta, Spain
20:00 (CEST)	Scoring by quarter: 24–19, 24–17, 18–25, 22–19
	Pts: Ribas 18; Rebs: Eriksson, Tomić 7 Asts: Perperoglou 6 PIR: Eriksson 21	Boxscore	Pts: Žorić 16; Rebs: Sánchez 5 Asts: Nachbar 5 PIR: three players 15	Arena: Pavelló Esportiu Municipal; Referees: Martín Bertrán, Oyón, Mas

4 September 2016 2	FC Barcelona Lassa (Spain)	80–54	(Spain) MoraBanc Andorra	Sant Julià de Vilatorta, Spain
18:00 (CEST)	Scoring by quarter: 13–11, 20–13, 27–18, 20–12
	Pts: Kurucs 21; Rebs: Oleson 6 Asts: Kurucs, Rice 4 PIR: Rice 15	Boxscore	Pts: Stević 14; Rebs: Antetokounmpo, Stević 6 Asts: Albicy 9 PIR: Stević 16	Arena: Pavelló Esportiu Municipal; Referees: Martín Bertrán, Munar, Mas

11 September 2016 3	FC Barcelona Lassa (Spain)	63–61	(Russia) Zenit Saint Petersburg	Monzón, Spain
12:45 (CEST)	Scoring by quarter: 19–20, 11–13, 12–10, 21–18
		Boxscore

16 September 2016 4	CSKA Moscow (Russia)	100–96(OT)	(Spain) FC Barcelona Lassa	Athens, Greece
18:30 (CEST)	Scoring by quarter: 22–25, 24–19, 18–20, 21–21, Overtime: 15–11
	Pts: De Colo 28; Rebs: Augustine, De Colo 6 Asts: Teodosić 8 PIR: De Colo 35	Boxscore	Pts: Rice 19; Rebs: Tomić 14; Asts: Rice 5 PIR: Tomić 32	Arena: Olympic Sports Center Athens; Attendance: 5,000; Referees: Gkontas, Anastopoulos, Tsrouxa

17 September 2016 5	Maccabi Tel Aviv (Israel)	92–87	(Spain) FC Barcelona Lassa	Athens, Greece
18:30 (CEST)	Scoring by quarter: 21–26, 17–14, 27–28, 27–19
	Pts: Rudd 18; Rebs: Iverson 10; Asts: Mekel 5 PIR: Rudd 22	Boxscore	Pts: Rice 25; Rebs: Tomić, Vezenkov 6 Asts: Tomić 4 PIR: Rice 23	Arena: Olympic Sports Center Athens; Attendance: 8,000; Referees: Piloidis, Karakatsounis, Somos

28 September 2016 6	FC Barcelona Lassa (Spain)	78–52	(Spain) Divina Seguros Joventut	Andorra la Vella, Andorra
18:30 (CEST)	Scoring by quarter: 18–8, 18–15, 24–11, 18–18
	Pts: Eriksson 22; Rebs: Peno 6 Asts: Oleson 4 PIR: Eriksson 23	Boxscore	Pts: Abalde 14; Rebs: three players 4 Asts: Sàbat 4 PIR: Abalde 11	Arena: Poliesportiu d'Andorra; Referees: Martín Bertrán, Cardús, Mas

29 September 2016 7	ICL Manresa (Spain)	63–77	(Spain) FC Barcelona Lassa	Andorra la Vella, Andorra
21:00 (CEST)	Scoring by quarter: 9–25, 17–23, 17–12, 20–17
	Pts: Auda 15; Rebs: Auda 9 Asts: Costa, Cvetković 2 PIR: Auda 22	Boxscore	Pts: Doellman 16; Rebs: Tomić 10; Asts: Perperoglou 5 PIR: Doellman, Tomić 22	Arena: Poliesportiu d'Andorra; Referees: Perea, Munar, Mas

5 October 2016 8	FC Barcelona Lassa (Spain)	89–92	(United States) Oklahoma City Thunder	Barcelona, Spain
20:30 (CEST)	Scoring by quarter: 25–26, 22–19, 21–22, 21–25
	Pts: Claver 25; Rebs: Tomić 6 Asts: Oleson, Peno 6	Boxscore	Pts: Kanter 24; Rebs: Kanter 8 Asts: Westbrook 5	Arena: Palau Sant Jordi; Attendance: 16,236; Referees: Globe, Boland, Radović

== Competitions ==
=== Overall ===
Competition	Started round	Current position / round	Final position / round	First match	Last match
Liga ACB	Matchday 1	6th	Quarterfinals	2 October 2016	27 May 2017
EuroLeague	Matchday 1	11th	11th	14 October 2016	6 April 2017
Copa del Rey	Quarterfinals	—	Semifinals	17 February 2017	18 February 2017
Supercopa de España	Semifinals	—	Runners-up	23 September 2016	24 September 2016

Updated to match played May 27, 2017
Source: Competitions

=== Overview ===
Competition	Record							
Competition	Pld	W	D	L	PF	PA	PD	Win %
Liga ACB	32	22	0	10	2,631	2,426	+205	68.75
EuroLeague	30	12	0	18	2,134	2,232	−98	40.00
Copa del Rey	2	1	0	1	149	146	+3	50.00
Supercopa de España	2	1	0	1	158	172	−14	50.00
Total	66	36	0	30	5,072	4,976	+96	54.55

Last updated: September 18, 2025
Source: Competitions

=== Supercopa de España ===
Win Loss

23 September 2016 Semifinals	Real Madrid	93–99	FC Barcelona Lassa	Vitoria-Gasteiz
21:30 (CEST)	Scoring by quarter: 26–26, 22–21, 22–26, 23–26
	Pts: Llull 27; Rebs: Dončić 8 Asts: Fernández 5 PIR: Llull 22	Boxscore	Pts: Rice 30; Rebs: Tomić 8 Asts: Rice 6 PIR: Rice 34	Arena: Fernando Buesa Arena; Attendance: 9,257; Referees: García González, Jiménez, Peruga

24 September 2016 Final	Herbalife Gran Canaria	79–59	FC Barcelona Lassa	Vitoria-Gasteiz
19:00 (CEST)	Scoring by quarter: 23–17, 27–22, 12–9, 17–11
	Pts: McCalebb 15; Rebs: O'Neale 8 Asts: O'Neale, Oliver 4 PIR: Báez, McCalebb 18	Boxscore	Pts: Claver, Navarro 12; Rebs: Dorsey 8 Asts: Navarro 4 PIR: Claver 18	Arena: Fernando Buesa Arena; Attendance: 9,350; Referees: Martín Bertrán, Conde, Manuel

=== Liga ACB ===
==== League table ====
Pos	Team	Pld	W	L	PF	PA	PD	Qualification or relegation
4	Unicaja	32	22	10	2661	2495	+166	Qualification to playoffs
5	Iberostar Tenerife	32	22	10	2466	2277	+189	Qualification to playoffs
6	FC Barcelona Lassa	32	22	10	2631	2426	+205	Qualification to playoffs
7	Herbalife Gran Canaria	32	21	11	2710	2438	+272	Qualification to playoffs
8	MoraBanc Andorra	32	16	16	2611	2687	−76	Qualification to playoffs

Source: ACB

==== Results summary ====
Overall						Home					Away				
Pld	W	L	PF	PA	PD	W	L	PF	PA	PD	W	L	PF	PA	PD
32	22	10	2631	2426	+205	14	2	1374	1185	+189	8	8	1257	1241	+16

Last updated: September 18, 2025.
Source: Competitive matches

==== Results by round ====
Round	1	2	3	4	5	6	7	8	9	10	11	12	13	14	15	16	17	18	19	20	21	22	23	24	25	26	27	28	29	30	31	32	33	34
Ground	A	R	H	A	H	A	H	A	H	A	H	A	H	H	A	H	A	R	A	H	H	A	H	A	A	H	A	H	A	H	A	H	H	A
Result	W	R	W	L	W	W	W	W	W	L	W	L	W	W	W	W	L	R	W	L	W	L	W	L	W	W	L	W	L	W	W	W	L	W
Position	7	6	5	7	5	4	3	2	2	3	2	4	3	2	2	2	4	3	3	4	4	5	5	6	5	4	6	4	6	5	4	3	6	6

Last updated: September 18, 2025.
Source: Competitive matches
Ground: A = Away; H = Home; R = Rest. Result: L = Loss; W = Win; R = Rest; P = Postponed.

==== Matches ====
Win Loss

2 October 2016 1	ICL Manresa	50–56	FC Barcelona Lassa	Manresa
12:30 (CEST)	Scoring by quarter: 5–9, 10–14, 16–17, 19–16
	Pts: Suggs 14; Rebs: Tomàs 11; Asts: Čakarun, Costa 2 PIR: Čakarun 9	Boxscore	Pts: Tomić 13; Rebs: Tomić 11; Asts: Oleson 3 PIR: Tomić 25	Arena: Nou Congost; Attendance: 3,980; Referees: Perea, Calatrava, Cardús

9 October 2016 3	FC Barcelona Lassa	98–92(OT)	Baskonia	Barcelona
17:00 (CEST)	Scoring by quarter: 23–20, 30–27, 17–20, 14–17, Overtime: 14–8
	Pts: Doellman 24; Rebs: Dorsey 8 Asts: Rice 4 PIR: Doellman 21	Boxscore	Pts: Bargnani 18; Rebs: Hanga 10; Asts: Larkin 8 PIR: Hanga 19	Arena: Palau Blaugrana; Attendance: 5,042; Referees: Jiménez Trujillo, Bultó, Rial

16 October 2016 4	RETAbet Bilbao Basket	92–79	FC Barcelona Lassa	Bilbao
12:30 (CEST)	Scoring by quarter: 27–18, 11–16, 30–26, 24–19
	Pts: Bamforth 25; Rebs: Eric 6 Asts: Borg, Mumbrú 5 PIR: Bamforth 27	Boxscore	Pts: Rice 29; Rebs: Tomić 6 Asts: Rice 6 PIR: Rice 33	Arena: Bilbao Arena; Attendance: 9,703; Referees: Pérez Pérez, Martínez, Serrano

23 October 2016 5	FC Barcelona Lassa	80–58	Real Betis Energía Plus	Barcelona
12:30 (CEST)	Scoring by quarter: 23–14, 20–17, 15–15, 22–12
	Pts: Eriksson 17; Rebs: Tomić 9 Asts: Peno 5 PIR: Tomić 27	Boxscore	Pts: Lockett 13; Rebs: Lockett 7 Asts: Stojanovski 3 PIR: Lockett 18	Arena: Palau Blaugrana; Attendance: 4,091; Referees: Cortés, Araña, Mas Cagide

30 October 2016 6	Montakit Fuenlabrada	75–78	FC Barcelona Lassa	Fuenlabrada
12:30 (CET)	Scoring by quarter: 20–18, 19–27, 18–12, 18–21
	Pts: Paunić 18; Rebs: Diagne 7 Asts: three players 3 PIR: Diagne 20	Boxscore	Pts: Perperoglou 17; Rebs: Vezenkov 8 Asts: Rice 7 PIR: Vezenkov 21	Arena: Fernando Martín; Attendance: 4,749; Referees: Pérez Pizarro, Castillo, Fernández

6 November 2016 7	FC Barcelona Lassa	85–75	Real Madrid	Barcelona
18:30 (CET)	Scoring by quarter: 20–15, 29–18, 18–20, 18–22
	Pts: Tomić 19; Rebs: Tomić 7 Asts: Tomić 5 PIR: Tomić 33	Boxscore	Pts: Draper 13; Rebs: Randolph 8 Asts: Mačiulis 5 PIR: Hunter 16	Arena: Palau Blaugrana; Attendance: 6,581; Referees: García González, Calatrava, Munar

12 November 2016 8	UCAM Murcia	83–99	FC Barcelona Lassa	Murcia
18:30 (CET)	Scoring by quarter: 20–21, 14–20, 22–34, 27–24
	Pts: Campazzo 24; Rebs: Rojas 8 Asts: Campazzo 3 PIR: Campazzo 26	Boxscore	Pts: Koponen, Rice 23; Rebs: three players 6 Asts: Rice 3 PIR: Tomić 25	Arena: Palacio de Deportes; Attendance: 6,906; Referees: Hierrezuelo, Sánchez Monserrat, Pérez Niz

20 November 2016 9	FC Barcelona Lassa	92–80	Movistar Estudiantes	Barcelona
12:30 (CET)	Scoring by quarter: 28–22, 23–10, 20–17, 21–31
	Pts: Eriksson 18; Rebs: Dorsey 13; Asts: Koponen, Rice 6 PIR: Tomić 25	Boxscore	Pts: Jackson 25; Rebs: Jackson, Suton 5 Asts: Cook 4 PIR: Jackson 23	Arena: Palau Blaugrana; Attendance: 4,719; Referees: Peruga, García Ortiz, Aliaga

27 November 2016 10	Unicaja	95–89(OT)	FC Barcelona Lassa	Málaga
18:30 (CET)	Scoring by quarter: 19–15, 17–14, 22–26, 20–23, Overtime: 17–11
	Pts: Fogg 29; Rebs: Musli 7 Asts: Lafayette, Waczyński 4 PIR: Fogg 29	Boxscore	Pts: Koponen 20; Rebs: Tomić 11; Asts: Rice 7 PIR: Tomić 20	Arena: Martín Carpena; Attendance: 9,194; Referees: Cortés, Perea, Rial

4 December 2016 11	FC Barcelona Lassa	79–78	Herbalife Gran Canaria	Barcelona
18:30 (CET)	Scoring by quarter: 23–19, 22–20, 11–20, 23–19
	Pts: Perperoglou 16; Rebs: Dorsey 6 Asts: Renfroe 5 PIR: Perperoglou 16	Boxscore	Pts: Pasečņiks 18; Rebs: O'Neale 8 Asts: McCalebb 9 PIR: Pasečņiks 19	Arena: Palau Blaugrana; Attendance: 5,287; Referees: Martín Bertrán, Manuel, Martínez Díez

11 December 2016 12	MoraBanc Andorra	87–80	FC Barcelona Lassa	Andorra la Vella
18:00 (CET)	Scoring by quarter: 22–18, 20–18, 18–22, 27–22
	Pts: Jelínek 18; Rebs: Antetokounmpo 5 Asts: Albicy 7 PIR: Jelínek 23	Boxscore	Pts: Tomić 21; Rebs: Tomić 9 Asts: Rice, Tomić 4 PIR: Tomić 33	Arena: Poliesportiu d'Andorra; Attendance: 4835; Referees: Hierrezuelo, Castillo, Sanchez Mohedas

18 December 2016 13	FC Barcelona Lassa	79–77	Divina Seguros Joventut	Barcelona
12:30 (CET)	Scoring by quarter: 18–18, 13–21, 30–19, 18–19
	Pts: Vezenkov 18; Rebs: Dorsey, Tomić 7 Asts: Tomić 4 PIR: Tomić 27	Boxscore	Pts: Sàbat 17; Rebs: Jordan 6 Asts: five players 2 PIR: Bogdanović 18	Arena: Palau Blaugrana; Attendance: 4,846; Referees: Conde, Sánchez Monserrat, Fernández

27 December 2016 14	FC Barcelona Lassa	94–82	Valencia Basket	Barcelona
19:15 (CET)	Scoring by quarter: 25–20, 19–10, 27–28, 23–24
	Pts: Rice 25; Rebs: Tomić 7 Asts: Koponen, Tomić 4 PIR: Rice 29	Boxscore	Pts: Martínez, Sikma 15; Rebs: Sikma 5 Asts: Martínez 3 PIR: Sikma 16	Arena: Palau Blaugrana; Attendance: 5,164; Referees: García González, Calatrava, Munar

2 January 2017 15	Tecnyconta Zaragoza	75–86	FC Barcelona Lassa	Zaragoza
20:00 (CET)	Scoring by quarter: 17–19, 17–32, 16–24, 25–11
	Pts: Benzing 20; Rebs: Norel 8 Asts: Gecevičius 4 PIR: Norel 27	Boxscore	Pts: Koponen, Tomić 18; Rebs: Tomić 6 Asts: Oleson 5 PIR: Tomić 25	Arena: Pabellón Príncipe Felipe; Attendance: 8,861; Referees: Hierrezuelo, Araña, Aliaga

8 January 2017 16	FC Barcelona Lassa	100–76	Rio Natura Monbus Obradoiro	Barcelona
12:30 (CET)	Scoring by quarter: 30–22, 25–18, 25–14, 20–22
	Pts: Navarro 18; Rebs: Tomić 8 Asts: Renfroe, Tomić 4 PIR: Tomić 28	Boxscore	Pts: Whittington 20; Rebs: Whittington 5 Asts: McConnell 5 PIR: Whittington 18	Arena: Palau Blaugrana; Attendance: 4,172; Referees: Pérez Pérez, Manuel, Martínez Díez

15 January 2017 17	Iberostar Tenerife	71–60	FC Barcelona Lassa	San Cristóbal de La Laguna
18:30 (CET)	Scoring by quarter: 23–15, 6–18, 20–10, 22–17
	Pts: Bogris 16; Rebs: Bogris 11; Asts: San Miguel 5 PIR: Bogris 24	Boxscore	Pts: Doellman 15; Rebs: Doellman, Tomić 6 Asts: four players 2 PIR: Doellman 21	Arena: Santiago Martín; Attendance: 5,146; Referees: Martín Bertrán, García Ortiz, Zamorano

29 January 2017 19	Baskonia	84–92	FC Barcelona Lassa	Vitoria-Gasteiz
18:30 (CET)	Scoring by quarter: 21–20, 14–21, 21–27, 28–24
	Pts: Larkin, Voigtmann 16; Rebs: Sedekerskis, Voigtmann 5 Asts: Larkin 7 PIR: Larkin 20	Boxscore	Pts: Tomić 21; Rebs: Claver 7 Asts: Rice 8 PIR: Tomić 25	Arena: Fernando Buesa Arena; Attendance: 10,678; Referees: García González, Bultó, Caballero

5 February 2017 20	FC Barcelona Lassa	68–76	RETAbet Bilbao Basket	Barcelona
12:30 (CET)	Scoring by quarter: 20–22, 17–15, 12–11, 19–28
	Pts: Vezenkov 20; Rebs: Tomić 11; Asts: Eriksson 3 PIR: Vezenkov 21	Boxscore	Pts: Mumbrú 17; Rebs: Hervelle 8 Asts: Tabu 8 PIR: Tabu, Todorović 16	Arena: Palau Blaugrana; Attendance: 4,525; Referees: Emilio Pérez Pizarro, Francisco Araña, Rubén Sánchez Mohedas

12 February 2017 21	FC Barcelona Lassa	92–72	ICL Manresa	Barcelona
12:30 (CET)	Scoring by quarter: 33–23, 22–18, 18–20, 19–11
	Pts: Eriksson 21; Rebs: Tomić 9 Asts: Rice 6 PIR: Eriksson 17	Boxscore	Pts: Suggs 14; Rebs: Tomàs 8 Asts: four players 2 PIR: Suggs 19	Arena: Palau Blaugrana; Attendance: 3,401; Referees: Carlos Cortés, Jordi Aliaga, Jacobo Rial

26 February 2017 22	Movistar Estudiantes	83–81(OT)	FC Barcelona Lassa	Madrid
12:30 (CET)	Scoring by quarter: 18–19, 15–16, 23–27, 18–12, Overtime: 9–7
	Pts: Jackson 32; Rebs: Suton 15; Asts: Cook 5 PIR: Jackson 28	Boxscore	Pts: Tomić 18; Rebs: Tomić 9 Asts: Koponen 6 PIR: Tomić 31	Arena: WiZink Center; Attendance: 13,425; Referees: Carlos Peruga, Sergio Manuel, Victor Mas

5 March 2017 23	FC Barcelona Lassa	73–70	UCAM Murcia	Barcelona
12:30 (CET)	Scoring by quarter: 14–15, 24–18, 16–22, 19–15
	Pts: Faverani 16; Rebs: Faverani 8 Asts: Koponen 8 PIR: Faverani 20	Boxscore	Pts: Campazzo 20; Rebs: Rojas, Tumba 8 Asts: Campazzo, Llompart 4 PIR: Campazzo 17	Arena: Palau Blaugrana; Attendance: 3,986; Referees: Emilio Pérez Pizarro, Juan de Dios Oyón, Miguel Ángel Pérez Niz

12 March 2017 24	Real Madrid	76–75	FC Barcelona Lassa	Madrid
18:00 (CET)	Scoring by quarter: 23–23, 24–13, 15–21, 14–18
	Pts: Llull 16; Rebs: Hunter 8 Asts: Llull 7 PIR: Hunter 17	Boxscore	Pts: Perperoglou 16; Rebs: Tomić 8 Asts: Tomić 4 PIR: Tomić 26	Arena: WiZink Center; Attendance: 12,448; Referees: José Antonio Martín Bertrán, Carlos Cortés, Martín Caballero

19 March 2017 25	Divina Seguros Joventut	56–76	FC Barcelona Lassa	Badalona
12:30 (CET)	Scoring by quarter: 18–18, 10–14, 6–29, 22–15
	Pts: Abalde 9 Rebs: Gielo 4 Asts: Jordan, Sàbat 3 PIR: Sàbat 8	Boxscore	Pts: Koponen, Perperoglou 19; Rebs: Tomić 10; Asts: three players 3 PIR: Koponen 22	Arena: Pavelló Olímpic de Badalona; Attendance: 7,243; Referees: Juan Carlos García González, Francisco Araña, Antonio Sacristán

26 March 2017 26	FC Barcelona Lassa	102–65	MoraBanc Andorra	Barcelona
12:30 (CET)	Scoring by quarter: 20–18, 23–13, 20–13, 39–21
	Pts: Vezenkov 18; Rebs: Diagne 12; Asts: seven players 2 PIR: Vezenkov 22	Boxscore	Pts: Shermadini 18; Rebs: Shermadini 5 Asts: Albicy 5 PIR: Burjanadze 22	Arena: Palau Blaugrana; Attendance: 3,423; Referees: Miguel Ángel Pérez Pérez, Luis Miguel Castillo, Anna Cardús

1 April 2017 27	Herbalife Gran Canaria	95–82	FC Barcelona Lassa	Las Palmas
19:00 (CET)	Scoring by quarter: 29–18, 25–19, 21–21, 20–24
	Pts: Kuric, McCalebb 13; Rebs: Hendrix, O'Neale 5 Asts: Oliver 7 PIR: Aguilar 19	Boxscore	Pts: Navarro, Tomić 19; Rebs: Tomić 14; Asts: Rice 4 PIR: Tomić 25	Arena: Gran Canaria Arena; Attendance: 7,966; Referees: Antonio Conde, Fernando Calatrava, Jordi Aliaga

9 April 2017 28	FC Barcelona Lassa	91–88	Tecnyconta Zaragoza	Barcelona
12:30 (CET)	Scoring by quarter: 21–20, 25–20, 26–27, 19–21
	Pts: Vezenkov 21; Rebs: Tomić 10; Asts: Tomić 5 PIR: Vezenkov 22	Boxscore	Pts: Jelovac 25; Rebs: Norel 7 Asts: Bellas, Benzing 3 PIR: Jelovac 30	Arena: Palau Blaugrana; Attendance: 3,363; Referees: Daniel Hierrezuelo, Jorge Martínez, Rubén Sánchez Mohedas

16 April 2017 29	Valencia Basket	76–59	FC Barcelona Lassa	Valencia
18:30 (CET)	Scoring by quarter: 16–14, 19–15, 16–14, 25–16
	Pts: Oriola 14; Rebs: Oriola 7 Asts: Diot 6 PIR: Oriola 19	Boxscore	Pts: Rice, Tomić 13; Rebs: Tomić 11; Asts: Koponen 3 PIR: Tomić 16	Arena: Pavelló Municipal Font de Sant Lluís; Attendance: 8,200; Referees: Emilio Pérez Pizarro, Sergio Manuel, Andrés Fernández Sánchez

23 April 2017 30	FC Barcelona Lassa	89–70	Unicaja	Barcelona
17:00 (CET)	Scoring by quarter: 28–20, 21–15, 20–17, 20–18
	Pts: Tomić 20; Rebs: Tomić 7 Asts: Renfroe, Tomić 4 PIR: Tomić 32	Boxscore	Pts: three players 11; Rebs: Omić 9 Asts: Nedović 5 PIR: Omić 16	Arena: Palau Blaugrana; Attendance: 3,117; Referees: José Antonio Martín Bertrán, Vicente Bultó, Martín Caballero

29 April 2017 31	Real Betis Energía Plus	72–89	FC Barcelona Lassa	Sevilla
19:00 (CET)	Scoring by quarter: 22–24, 16–26, 20–20, 14–19
	Pts: DeVries 17; Rebs: DeVries 6 Asts: Lockett 7 PIR: DeVries 21	Boxscore	Pts: Eriksson 18; Rebs: Claver, Tomić 7 Asts: three players 3 PIR: Eriksson 22	Arena: Palacio Municipal de Deportes San Pablo; Attendance: 6,705; Referees: Antonio Conde, Luis Miguel Castillo, Pedro Munar

7 May 2017 32	FC Barcelona Lassa	87–53	Montakit Fuenlabrada	Barcelona
12:30 (CET)	Scoring by quarter: 16–16, 30–11, 19–16, 22–10
	Pts: Vezenkov 14; Rebs: Tomić 10; Asts: five players 3 PIR: Tomić 24	Boxscore	Pts: Cruz, Popović 10; Rebs: Šmits 8 Asts: Cruz 3 PIR: Popović 9	Arena: Palau Blaugrana; Attendance: 3,274; Referees: Benjamín Jiménez, Francisco Araña, Victor Mas

11 May 2017 33	FC Barcelona Lassa	65–73	Iberostar Tenerife	Barcelona
19:30 (CET)	Scoring by quarter: 15–19, 18–13, 15–21, 17–20
	Pts: Tomić 16; Rebs: Tomić 8 Asts: Perperoglou, Rice 3 PIR: Tomić 22	Boxscore	Pts: Doornekamp 20; Rebs: Doornekamp, Kirksay 6 Asts: White 5 PIR: Doornekamp 24	Arena: Palau Blaugrana; Attendance: 3,597; Referees: Emilio Pérez Pizarro, Vicente Bultó, Antonio Sacristán

14 May 2017 34	Rio Natura Monbus Obradoiro	71–76	FC Barcelona Lassa	Santiago de Compostela
18:00 (CET)	Scoring by quarter: 13–22, 21–14, 18–23, 19–17
	Pts: McConnell 18; Rebs: McConnell 5 Asts: McConnell 7 PIR: McConnell 22	Boxscore	Pts: Rice 16; Rebs: Claver 8 Asts: Rice 5 PIR: Rice 16	Arena: Pavillón Multiusos Fontes do Sar; Attendance: 4,487; Referees: Antonio Conde, Sergio Manuel, Martín Caballero

==== Results overview ====
Win Draw Loss

Opposition	Home score	Away score	Double
Baskonia	98–92	84–92	190–176
Divina Seguros Joventut	79–77	56–76	155-133
Herbalife Gran Canaria	79–78	95-82	161-173
Iberostar Tenerife	65-73	71–60	125-144
ICL Manresa	92-72	50–56	148-122
Montakit Fuenlabrada	87-53	75–78	165-128
MoraBanc Andorra	102-65	87–80	182-152
Movistar Estudiantes	92–80	83-81	173-163
Real Betis Energía Plus	80–58	72-89	169-130
Real Madrid	85–75	76-75	160-151
RETAbet Bilbao Basket	68-76	92–79	147-168
Rio Natura Monbus Obradoiro	100–76	71-76	176-147
Tecnyconta Zaragoza	91-88	75–86	177-163
UCAM Murcia	73-70	83–99	172-153
Unicaja	89-70	95–89	178-165
Valencia Basket	94–82	76-59	153-158

=== ACB Playoffs ===
Win Loss

==== Quarterfinals ====
20 May 2017 1st leg	Valencia Basket	83–61	FC Barcelona Lassa	Valencia
18:00 (CEST)	Scoring by quarter: 15–15, 26–11, 22–15, 20–20
	Pts: Dubljević 16; Rebs: Sikma 9 Asts: San Emeterio 7 PIR: Sikma 17	Boxscore	Pts: Rice 14; Rebs: Tomić 6 Asts: Renfroe, Rice 3 PIR: Rice 11	Arena: Pavelló Municipal Font de Sant Lluís; Attendance: 8,200; Referees: Juan Carlos García González, Sergio Manuel, Rafael Serrano

25 May 2017 2nd leg	FC Barcelona Lassa	91–79	Valencia Basket	Barcelona
20:00 (CEST)	Scoring by quarter: 20–19, 29–13, 24–27, 18–20
	Pts: Renfroe 16; Rebs: Claver, Tomić 7 Asts: Perperoglou, Tomić 4 PIR: Renfroe 21	Boxscore	Pts: Sastre 17; Rebs: four players 3 Asts: Martínez 7 PIR: Martínez 23	Arena: Palau Blaugrana; Attendance: 4,036; Referees: Daniel Hierrezuelo, Francisco Araña, Jorge Martínez

27 May 2017 3rd leg	Valencia Basket	67–64	FC Barcelona Lassa	Valencia
18:00 (CEST)	Scoring by quarter: 19–14, 12–12, 18–21, 18–17
	Pts: San Emeterio 13; Rebs: Dubljević 15; Asts: Diot 6 PIR: San Emeterio 21	Boxscore	Pts: Rice 18; Rebs: Oleson, Perperoglou 7 Asts: Koponen, Tomić 3 PIR: Tomić 20	Arena: Pavelló Municipal Font de Sant Lluís; Attendance: 8,400; Referees: Juan Carlos García González, Antonio Conde, Luis Miguel Castillo

=== EuroLeague ===
==== League table ====
Pos	Team	Pld	W	L	PF	PA	PD
9	(Serbia) Crvena zvezda mts	30	16	14	2203	2196	+7
10	(Lithuania) Žalgiris	30	14	16	2350	2391	−41
11	(Spain) FC Barcelona Lassa	30	12	18	2134	2232	−98
12	(Turkey) Galatasaray Odeabank	30	11	19	2345	2475	−130
13	(Germany) Brose Bamberg	30	10	20	2369	2404	−35

Source: EuroLeague
Rules for classification: All points scored in extra period(s) will not be counted in the standings, nor for any tie-break situation.

==== Results summary ====
Overall						Home					Away				
Pld	W	L	PF	PA	PD	W	L	PF	PA	PD	W	L	PF	PA	PD
30	12	18	2134	2232	−98	9	6	1118	1125	−7	3	12	1016	1107	−91

Last updated: September 18, 2025.
Source: Competitive matches

==== Results by round ====
Round	1	2	3	4	5	6	7	8	9	10	11	12	13	14	15	16	17	18	19	20	21	22	23	24	25	26	27	28	29	30
Ground	A	H	A	H	A	H	A	H	A	H	A	A	A	H	H	A	H	H	A	H	A	H	A	H	H	A	A	H	H	A
Result	W	L	L	W	W	W	L	L	L	W	L	L	L	W	W	L	L	W	L	L	L	L	W	L	W	L	L	W	W	L
Position	4	6	12	9	6	5	8	11	12	10	10	11	12	10	10	11	12	9	10	11	12	12	11	11	11	11	12	11	11	11

Last updated: February 3, 2017.
Source: Competitive matches
Ground: A = Away; H = Home; R = Rest. Result: L = Loss; W = Win; R = Rest; P = Postponed.

==== Matches ====
Win Loss

14 October 2016 1	UNICS (Russia)	63–69	(Spain) FC Barcelona Lassa	Kazan
18:00 (CEST)	Scoring by quarter: 21–23, 15–11, 15–9, 12–26
	Pts: Langford 14; Rebs: Williams 15; Asts: Ponkrashov 6 PIR: Williams 25	[euroleaguebasketball.net/en/euroleague/game-center/2016-17/unics-kazan-fc-barcelona-lassa/E2016/8/ Boxscore]	Pts: Doellman 23; Rebs: Tomić 9 Asts: Rice 9 PIR: Doellman, Tomić 25	Arena: Basket Hall Kazan; Attendance: 5,801; Referees: Saša Pukl (SLO), Piotr Pastusiak (POL), Robert Vyklický (CZE)

21 October 2016 2	FC Barcelona Lassa (Spain)	72–73	(Turkey) Fenerbahçe	Barcelona
21:00 (CEST)	Scoring by quarter: 19–21, 17–19, 15–13, 21–20
	Pts: Rice 19; Rebs: Tomić 8 Asts: Oleson, Rice 6 PIR: Rice 19	[euroleaguebasketball.net/en/euroleague/game-center/2016-17/fc-barcelona-lassa-fenerbahce-istanbul/E2016/14/ Boxscore]	Pts: Dixon, Sloukas 15; Rebs: Udoh 8 Asts: Bogdanović, Sloukas 4 PIR: Udoh 15	Arena: Palau Blaugrana; Attendance: 5,827; Referees: Luigi Lamonica (ITA), Oļegs Latiševs (LAT), Miloš Koljenšić (MNE)

26 October 2016 3	Crvena zvezda mts (Serbia)	76–65	(Spain) FC Barcelona Lassa	Belgrade
19:00 (CEST)	Scoring by quarter: 9–16, 31–15, 20–17, 16–17
	Pts: Gudurić 21; Rebs: Simonović, Kuzmić 5 Asts: Jenkins 7 PIR: Gudurić 30	Boxscore	Pts: Oleson 15; Rebs: Claver 10; Asts: Oleson, Rice 5 PIR: Claver, Oleson 18	Arena: Kombank Arena; Attendance: 18,150; Referees: Borys Ryzhyk (UKR), Tolga Sahin (ITA), Clemens Fritz (GER)

28 October 2016 4	FC Barcelona Lassa (Spain)	78–74	(Germany) Brose Bamberg	Barcelona
21:00 (CEST)	Scoring by quarter: 19–19, 21–19, 19–19, 19–17
	Pts: Rice 18; Rebs: Dorsey 9 Asts: Perperoglou, Rice 6 PIR: Perperoglou 20	Boxscore	Pts: Causeur, Theis 19; Rebs: Melli 6 Asts: Zisis 6 PIR: Causeur 22	Arena: Palau Blaugrana; Attendance: 5,074; Referees: Ilija Belošević (SRB), Damir Javor (SLO), Amit Balak (ISR)

2 November 2016 5	Maccabi Tel Aviv (Israel)	69–79	(Spain) FC Barcelona Lassa	Tel Aviv
18:45 (CET)	Scoring by quarter: 18–20, 16–20, 13–18, 22–21
	Pts: Goudelock 19; Rebs: Smith 6 Asts: Seeley, Weems 4 PIR: Goudelock, Smith 19	Boxscore	Pts: Rice 21; Rebs: Dorsey 11; Asts: Dorsey 4 PIR: Dorsey 23	Arena: Menora Mivtachim Arena; Attendance: 11,060; Referees: Robert Lottermoser (GER), Fernando Rocha (POR), Matej Boltauzer (SLO)

10 November 2016 6	FC Barcelona Lassa (Spain)	92–86	(Lithuania) Žalgiris	Barcelona
21:00 (CET)	Scoring by quarter: 16–12, 20–23, 29–24, 27–27
	Pts: Rice 20; Rebs: Dorsey 10; Asts: Oleson 6 PIR: Rice 23	[euroleaguebasketball.net/en/euroleague/game-center/2016-17/fc-barcelona-lassa-zalgiris-kaunas/E2016/43/ Boxscore]	Pts: Motum 26; Rebs: Lima 8 Asts: Lima, Westermann 6 PIR: Motum 26	Arena: Palau Blaugrana; Attendance: 5,812; Referees: Sreten Radović (CRO), Milivoje Jovčić (SRB), Anee Panther (GER)

16 November 2016 7	Olympiacos (Greece)	59–52	(Spain) FC Barcelona Lassa	Piraeus
19:00 (CET)	Scoring by quarter: 21–16, 11–9, 17–13, 10–14
	Pts: Spanoulis 15; Rebs: Birch 7 Asts: Spanoulis 6 PIR: Spanoulis 17	Boxscore	Pts: Holmes 13; Rebs: Holmes 9 Asts: Koponen 4 PIR: Holmes 19	Arena: Peace and Friendship Stadium; Attendance: 10,875; Referees: Luigi Lamonica (ITA), Oļegs Latiševs (LAT), Tomislav Hordov (CRO)

18 November 2016 8	FC Barcelona Lassa (Spain)	63–102	(Spain) Real Madrid	Barcelona
21:00 (CET)	Scoring by quarter: 17–29, 14–25, 15–21, 17–27
	Pts: Rice 23; Rebs: Vezenkov 10; Asts: Rice 5 PIR: Rice 23	Boxscore	Pts: Llull 20; Rebs: Randolph 11; Asts: Llull 7 PIR: Randolph 25	Arena: Palau Blaugrana; Attendance: 7,013; Referees: Borys Rhyzhyk (UKR), Carmelo Paternico (ITA), Matej Boltauzer (SLO)

25 November 2016 9	Galatasaray Odeabank (Turkey)	78–64	(Spain) FC Barcelona Lassa	Istanbul
18:00 (CET)	Scoring by quarter: 17–16, 22–19, 22–13, 17–16
	Pts: Schilb, Güler 18; Rebs: Pleiß 11; Asts: Güler 7 PIR: Schilb 30	Boxscore	Pts: Rice 22; Rebs: Dorsey 10; Asts: Rice 4 PIR: Rice 16	Arena: Abdi İpekçi Arena; Attendance: 10,433; Referees: Sreten Radović (CRO), Robert Lottermoser (GER), Petri Mäntylä (FIN)

2 December 2016 10	FC Barcelona Lassa (Spain)	72–57	(Greece) Panathinaikos Superfoods	Barcelona
21:00 (CET)	Scoring by quarter: 19–19, 17–12, 21–9, 15–17
	Pts: Tomić 16; Rebs: Claver, Tomić 6 Asts: Rice, Doellman 4 PIR: Tomić 18	Boxscore	Pts: Feldeine, N. Calathes 13; Rebs: Nichols 7 Asts: Feldeine 4 PIR: Singleton 17	Arena: Palau Blaugrana; Attendance: 6,296; Referees: Luigi Lamonica (ITA), Milivoje Jovčić (SRB), Tomislav Hordov (CRO)

9 December 2016 11	Anadolu Efes (Turkey)	72–68	(Spain) FC Barcelona Lassa	Istanbul
18:00 (CET)	Scoring by quarter: 21–15, 15–13, 18–17, 18–23
	Pts: Granger 16; Rebs: Honeycutt 9 Asts: Granger 5 PIR: Brown 18	Boxscore	Pts: Rice 22; Rebs: Claver 8 Asts: Rice 7 PIR: Rice 19	Arena: Abdi İpekçi Arena; Attendance: 8,644; Referees: Borys Ryzhyk (UKR), Damir Javor (SLO), Aare Halliko (EST)

16 December 2016 12	CSKA Moscow (Russia)	92–76	(Spain) FC Barcelona Lassa	Moscow
18:30 (CET)	Scoring by quarter: 24–11, 20–31, 27–23, 21–11
	Pts: Higgins 23; Rebs: five players 3 Asts: Teodosić 11; PIR: Teodosić 26	Boxscore	Pts: Claver 17; Rebs: Vezenkov 9 Asts: Renfroe 4 PIR: Claver 24	Arena: Megasport Arena; Attendance: 11,273; Referees: Sreten Radović (CRO), Carmelo Paternico (ITA), Matej Boltauzer (SLO)

21 December 2016 13	Baskonia (Spain)	65–62	(Spain) FC Barcelona Lassa	Vitoria-Gasteiz
20:30 (CET)	Scoring by quarter: 9–16, 15–14, 23–15, 18–17
	Pts: Beaubois 19; Rebs: Voigtmann 8 Asts: Luz 3 PIR: Beaubois 18	Boxscore	Pts: Tomić 18; Rebs: Claver 8 Asts: Rice 8 PIR: Tomić 27	Arena: Fernando Buesa Arena; Attendance: 14,236; Referees: Fernando Rocha (POR), Oļegs Latiševs (LAT), Jakub Zamojski (POL)

23 December 2016 14	FC Barcelona Lassa (Spain)	89–75	(Italy) EA7 Emporio Armani Milan	Barcelona
21:00 (CET)	Scoring by quarter: 32–19, 17–16, 23–16, 17–24
	Pts: Tomić 19; Rebs: Dorsey 10; Asts: Rice 11; PIR: Tomić 32	Boxscore	Pts: Sanders 27; Rebs: three players 4 Asts: Hickman 8 PIR: Sanders 29	Arena: Palau Blaugrana; Attendance: 4,911; Referees: Ilija Belošević (SRB), Sašo Petek (SLO), Amit Balak (ISR)

30 December 2016 15	FC Barcelona Lassa (Spain)	81–77	(Turkey) Darüşşafaka Doğuş	Barcelona
21:00 (CET)	Scoring by quarter: 19–22, 16–18, 24–17, 22–20
	Pts: Tomić 16; Rebs: Dorsey 6 Asts: Navarro, Tomić 5 PIR: Tomić 23	Boxscore	Pts: Anderson 21; Rebs: Anderson, Žižić 6 Asts: Wilbekin 3 PIR: Anderson 23	Arena: Palau Blaugrana; Attendance: 5,248; Referees: Carmelo Paternico (ITA), Matej Boltauzer (SLO), Jurgis Laurinavičius (LTU)

5 January 2017 16	Brose Bamberg (Germany)	85–65	(Spain) FC Barcelona Lassa	Bamberg
20:00 (CET)	Scoring by quarter: 18–17, 22–14, 19–16, 26–18
	Pts: Strēlnieks, Miller 20; Rebs: Melli 13; Asts: Causeur, McNeal 5 PIR: Melli 30	Boxscore	Pts: Rice 19; Rebs: Doellman, Oleson 5 Asts: Rice, Navarro 4 PIR: Rice 15	Arena: Brose Arena; Attendance: 6,150; Referees: Fernando Rocha (POR), Borys Rhyzhyk (UKR), Mario Majkić (SLO)

12 January 2017 17	FC Barcelona Lassa (Spain)	67–69	(Greece) Olympiacos	Barcelona
21:00 (CET)	Scoring by quarter: 20–17, 13–12, 21–27, 13–13
	Pts: Koponen 16; Rebs: Tomić 9 Asts: Rice 5 PIR: Koponen 14	Boxscore	Pts: Printezis 16; Rebs: Printezis 9 Asts: Lojeski 4 PIR: Printezis 20	Arena: Palau Blaugrana; Attendance: 5,173; Referees: Luigi Lamonica (ITA), Milivoje Jovčić (SRB), Sašo Petek (SLO)

19 January 2017 18	FC Barcelona Lassa (Spain)	89–78	(Turkey) Anadolu Efes	Barcelona
21:00 (CET)	Scoring by quarter: 16–15, 17–19, 30–19, 26–25
	Pts: Koponen 20; Rebs: Faverani 8 Asts: Rice 9 PIR: Faverani 23	Boxscore	Pts: Paul 25; Rebs: Dunston 8 Asts: Granger 3 PIR: Paul 17	Arena: Palau Blaugrana; Attendance: 3,389; Referees: Christos Christodoulou (GRE), Ilija Belošević (SRB), Anne Panther (GER)

24 January 2017 19	Panathinaikos Superfoods (Greece)	71–65	(Spain) FC Barcelona Lassa	Athens
19:45 (CET)	Scoring by quarter: 15–13, 21–16, 18–17, 17–19
	Pts: Bourousis 14; Rebs: Bourousis 11; Asts: James 4 PIR: Bourousis 31	Boxscore	Pts: Rice 12; Rebs: Tomić 10; Asts: Rice 5 PIR: Doellman 13	Arena: Olympic Sports Center Athens; Attendance: 10,179; Referees: Sreten Radović (CRO), Emin Moğulkoç (TUR), Carmelo Paternico (ITA)

27 January 2017 20	FC Barcelona Lassa (Spain)	79–93	(Spain) Baskonia	Barcelona
19:00 (CET)	Scoring by quarter: 20–21, 23–32, 20–30, 16–10
	Pts: Rice 15; Rebs: Tomić 7 Asts: Koponen 5 PIR: Vezenkov 22	Boxscore	Pts: Larkin 18; Rebs: Hanga 7 Asts: Larkin, Laprovíttola 5 PIR: Larkin, Hanga 21	Arena: Palau Blaugrana; Attendance: 5,208; Referees: Robert Lottermoser (GER), Milivoje Jovčić (SRB), Piotr Pastusiak (POL)

2 February 2017 21	Žalgiris (Lithuania)	89–85	(Spain) FC Barcelona Lassa	Kaunas
19:00 (CET)	Scoring by quarter: 18–24, 21–14, 22–23, 28–24
	Pts: Lekavičius, Ulanovas 17; Rebs: Lekavičius 5 Asts: Westermann 6 PIR: Lekavičius, Ulanovas 25	Boxscore	Pts: Navarro 17; Rebs: Tomić 6 Asts: Rice 7 PIR: Faverani 17	Arena: Žalgirio Arena; Attendance: 12,347; Referees: Ilija Belošević (SRB), Oļegs Latiševs (LAT), Tomislav Hordov (CRO)

10 February 2017 22	FC Barcelona Lassa (Spain)	62–69	(Turkey) Galatasaray Odeabank	Barcelona
21:00 (CET)	Scoring by quarter: 16–10, 12–16, 22–19, 12–24
	Pts: Vezenkov 18; Rebs: Perperoglou 12; Asts: Rice 7 PIR: Vezenkov, Koponen 15	Boxscore	Pts: Tyus 19; Rebs: Tyus, Schilb 9 Asts: Schilb 5 PIR: Tyus 28	Arena: Palau Blaugrana; Attendance: 4,585; Referees: Saša Pukl (SLO), Fernando Rocha (POR), Miloš Koljenšić (MNE)

23 February 2017 23	EA7 Emporio Armani Milan (Italy)	78–83	(Spain) FC Barcelona Lassa	Assago
20:45 (CET)	Scoring by quarter: 22–22, 23–19, 10–24, 23–18
	Pts: Abass 14; Rebs: Cinciarini 5 Asts: Kalnietis 6 PIR: Cinciarini 17	Boxscore	Pts: Tomić 19; Rebs: Tomić 9 Asts: Rice 6 PIR: Tomić 24	Arena: Mediolanum Forum; Attendance: 9,688; Referees: Emin Moğulkoç (TUR), Piotr Pastusiak (POL), Seffi Shemmesh (ISR)

3 March 2017 24	FC Barcelona Lassa (Spain)	61–85	(Russia) CSKA Moscow	Barcelona
21:00 (CET)	Scoring by quarter: 4–29, 20–19, 23–18, 14–19
	Pts: Vezenkov 14; Rebs: Diagne 5 Asts: Koponen 3 PIR: Vezenkov 21	Boxscore	Pts: de Colo 21; Rebs: Higgins 6 Asts: Jackson 6 PIR: de Colo 20	Arena: Palau Blaugrana; Attendance: 5,088; Referees: Robert Lottermoser (GER), Oļegs Latiševs (LAT), Mario Majkić (SLO)

9 March 2017 25	FC Barcelona Lassa (Spain)	70–62	(Russia) UNICS	Barcelona
21:00 (CET)	Scoring by quarter: 24–20, 12–14, 19–10, 15–18
	Pts: Perperoglou 13; Rebs: Faverani 6 Asts: Oleson, Rice 4 PIR: Claver 15	Boxscore	Pts: Antipov 12; Rebs: Clarke 5 Asts: Colom 8 PIR: Antipov 15	Arena: Palau Blaugrana; Attendance: 3,681; Referees: Saša Pukl (SLO), Tomislav Hordov (CRO), Renaud Geller (BEL)

17 March 2017 26	Darüşşafaka Doğuş (Turkey)	67–56	(Spain) FC Barcelona Lassa	Istanbul
18:00 (CET)	Scoring by quarter: 11–13, 32–9, 10–20, 14–14
	Pts: Clyburn 15; Rebs: Žižić 13; Asts: Wilbekin 5 PIR: Žižić 21	Boxscore	Pts: Perperoglou 16; Rebs: Tomić 9 Asts: Rice 4 PIR: Perperoglou 21	Arena: Volkswagen Arena; Attendance: 4,926; Referees: Damir Javor (SLO), Petri Mäntylä (FIN), Robert Vyklický (CZE)

22 March 2017 27	Real Madrid (Spain)	85–69	(Spain) FC Barcelona Lassa	Madrid
21:00 (CET)	Scoring by quarter: 22–13, 19–14, 23–24, 21–18
	Pts: Llull 21; Rebs: Dončić 6 Asts: Llull 6 PIR: Llull 32	Boxscore	Pts: Tomić, Rice 12; Rebs: Tomić 10; Asts: Rice 4 PIR: Tomić 16	Arena: WiZink Center; Attendance: 11,759; Referees: Luigi Lamonica (ITA), Emin Moğulkoç (TUR), Miloš Koljenšić (MNE)

24 March 2017 28	FC Barcelona Lassa (Spain)	67–54	(Serbia) Crvena zvezda mts	Barcelona
21:00 (CET)	Scoring by quarter: 17–18, 15–11, 20–14, 15–11
	Pts: Perperoglou 17; Rebs: Claver 10; Asts: three players 3 PIR: Perperoglou 21	Boxscore	Pts: three players 8 Rebs: Simonović 8 Asts: Simonović 3 PIR: Simonović 14	Arena: Palau Blaugrana; Attendance: 3,629; Referees: Christos Christodoulou (GRE), Piotr Pastusiak (POL), Sérgio Silva (POR)

30 March 2017 29	FC Barcelona Lassa (Spain)	76–71	(Israel) Maccabi Tel Aviv	Barcelona
21:00 (CEST)	Scoring by quarter: 23–13, 17–19, 18–22, 18–17
	Pts: Tomić 15; Rebs: Tomić 6 Asts: Tomić 6 PIR: Tomić 23	Boxscore	Pts: Mekel 18; Rebs: Simpson 12; Asts: Mekel 7 PIR: Mekel 22	Arena: Palau Blaugrana; Attendance: 3,037 (tentative); Referees: Sreten Radović (CRO), Elias Koromilas (GRE), Uroš Obrknežević

6 April 2017 30	Fenerbahçe (Turkey)	68–65(OT)	(Spain) FC Barcelona Lassa	Istanbul
19:45 (CEST)	Scoring by quarter: 11–15, 19–16, 14–15, 14–12, Overtime: 10–7
	Pts: Bogdanović 15; Rebs: Udoh 15; Asts: Sloukas 5 PIR: Udoh 27	Boxscore	Pts: Rice 19; Rebs: Tomić, Claver 7 Asts: Tomić, Perperoglou 4 PIR: Claver 18	Arena: Fenerbahçe Ülker Sports Arena; Attendance: 11,790 (tentative); Referees: Fernando Rocha (POR), Ioannis Foufis (GRE), Tomislav Hodrov (CRO)

==== Results overview ====
Win Draw Loss

Opposition	Home score	Away score	Double
(Turkey) Anadolu Efes	89–78	72–68	157–150
(Spain) Baskonia	79–93	65–62	141–158
(Germany) Brose Bamberg	78–74	85–65	143–159
(Serbia) Crvena zvezda mts	67–54	76–65	132–130
(Russia) CSKA Moscow	92–76	61–85	137–177
(Turkey) Darüşşafaka Doğuş	81–77	67–56	137–144
(Italy) EA7 Emporio Armani Milan	89–75	78–83	172–153
(Turkey) Fenerbahçe	72–73	68–65	137–141
(Turkey) Galatasaray Odeabank	62–69	78–64	126–147
(Israel) Maccabi Tel Aviv	76–71	69–79	145–140
(Greece) Olympiacos	67–69	59–52	119–128
(Greece) Panathinaikos Superfoods	72–57	71–65	137–128
(Spain) Real Madrid	63–102	85–69	132–187
(Russia) UNICS	70–62	63–69	139–125
(Lithuania) Žalgiris	92–86	89–85	177–175

=== Copa del Rey ===
Win Loss

17 February 2017 Quarterfinals	FC Barcelona Lassa	82–70	Unicaja	Vitoria-Gasteiz
21:30 (CET)	Scoring by quarter: 17-22, 11-11, 30-18, 24-19
	Pts: Rice 20; Rebs: Tomić 6 Asts: Rice 7 PIR: Eriksson 23	Boxscore	Pts: Nedović 16; Rebs: Suárez 7 Asts: Nedović 3 PIR: Nedović 18	Arena: Fernando Buesa Arena; Attendance: 14,535; Referees: Juan Carlos García González, Emilio Pérez Pizarro, Sergio Manuel

18 February 2017 Semifinals	FC Barcelona Lassa	67–76	Valencia Basket	Vitoria-Gasteiz
21:00 (CET)	Scoring by quarter: 17-19, 21-10, 13-30, 16-17
	Pts: Tomić 17; Rebs: Tomić 15; Asts: Renfroe 6 PIR: Tomić 33	Boxscore	Pts: San Emeterio 16; Rebs: Sikma 8 Asts: van Rossom 3 PIR: San Emeterio 18	Arena: Fernando Buesa Arena; Attendance: 15,412; Referees: Juan Carlos García González, Emilio Pérez Pizarro, Carlos Cortés

== Individual awards ==
=== Lliga Catalana ===
Finals MVP

- (Kosovo) Justin Doellman

=== Liga ACB ===
Player of the Round

- (Croatia) Ante Tomić – Round 5, Round 7, Round 30
- (Montenegro) Tyrese Rice – Round 14

Player of the Month

- (Croatia) Ante Tomić – December

All-Liga ACB Second Team

- (Croatia) Ante Tomić

Best All-Young Team

- (Bulgaria) Aleksandar Vezenkov
