= Del Norte High School (New Mexico) =

High School on New Mexico

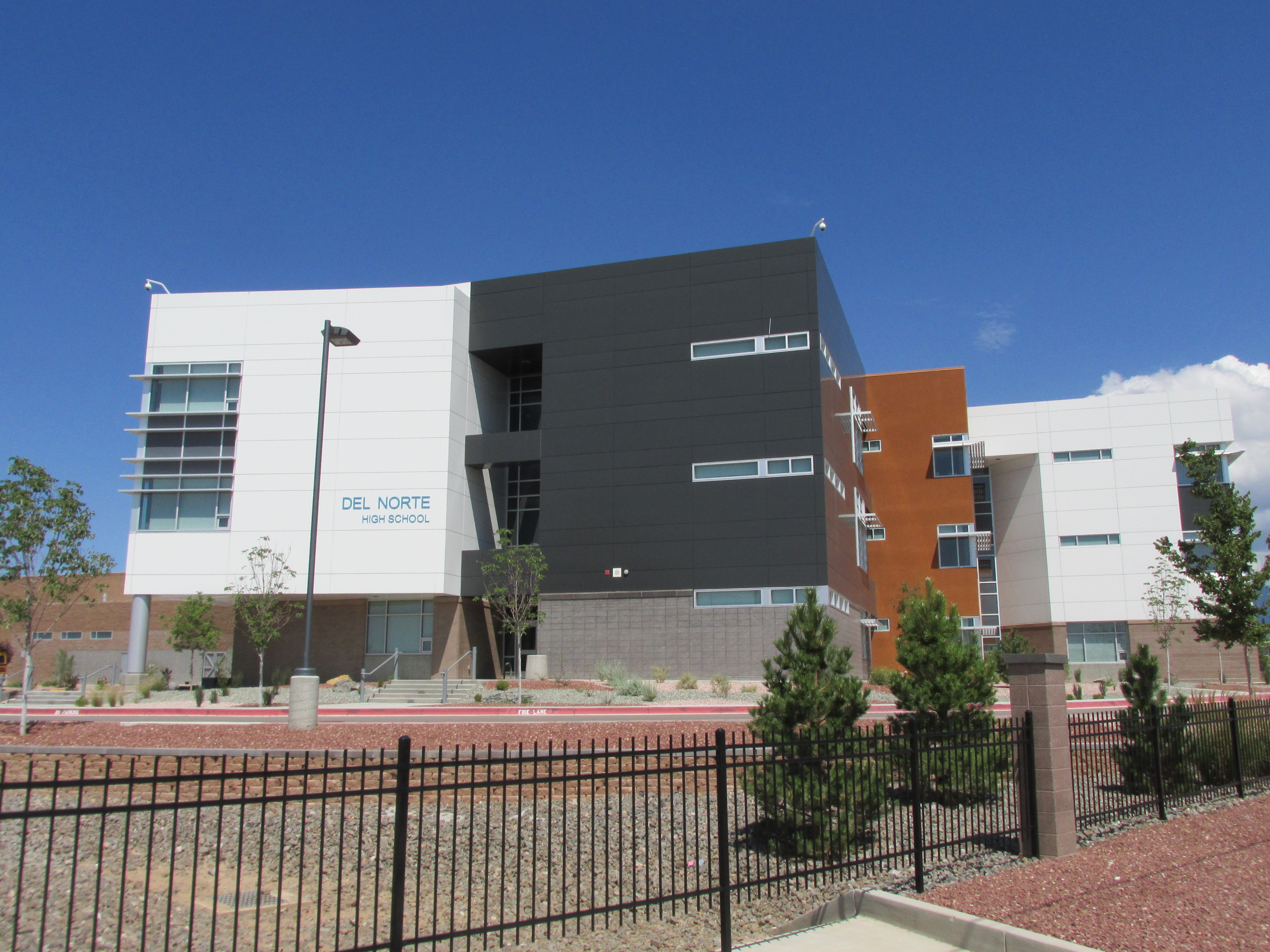

Location
- 5323 Montgomery Blvd. NE; Albuquerque, New Mexico 87109; United States; 35°07′56″N 106°34′59″W

Information
- Type: Public high school
- Motto: The Right Way, The Knight Way
- Established: 1964; 62 years ago
- Principal: Edward Bortot
- Staff: 69.50 (FTE)
- Enrollment: 1,066 (2023–24)
- Student to teacher ratio: 15.34
- Colors: Turquoise; Black; White
- Athletics conference: NMAA, AAAA Dist. 5
- Mascot: Knight
- Website: delnorte.aps.edu

Del Norte High School is a public high school in the northeast heights of Albuquerque, New Mexico, established in 1964. The school is situated on a 45.2-acre (183,000 m^{2}) campus (Albuquerque Public Schools District), and has an enrollment of 1,066 students.

== Academics ==
=== School grade ===
The New Mexico Public Education Department (NMPED) replaced the federal No Child Left Behind Act and AYP school rating tests in 2010 with a grading algorithm that uses several testing criteria including student standardized test scores and graduation rates.

School Year	Grade from NMPED
2010–11	B

=== Student body statistics ===
2023–2024:

Ethnicity
Hispanic	59%
American Indian/Alaskan Native	18%
White	10%
Black	4.1%
Asian	3.5%
Multiracial	4.6%

== Reconstruction ==
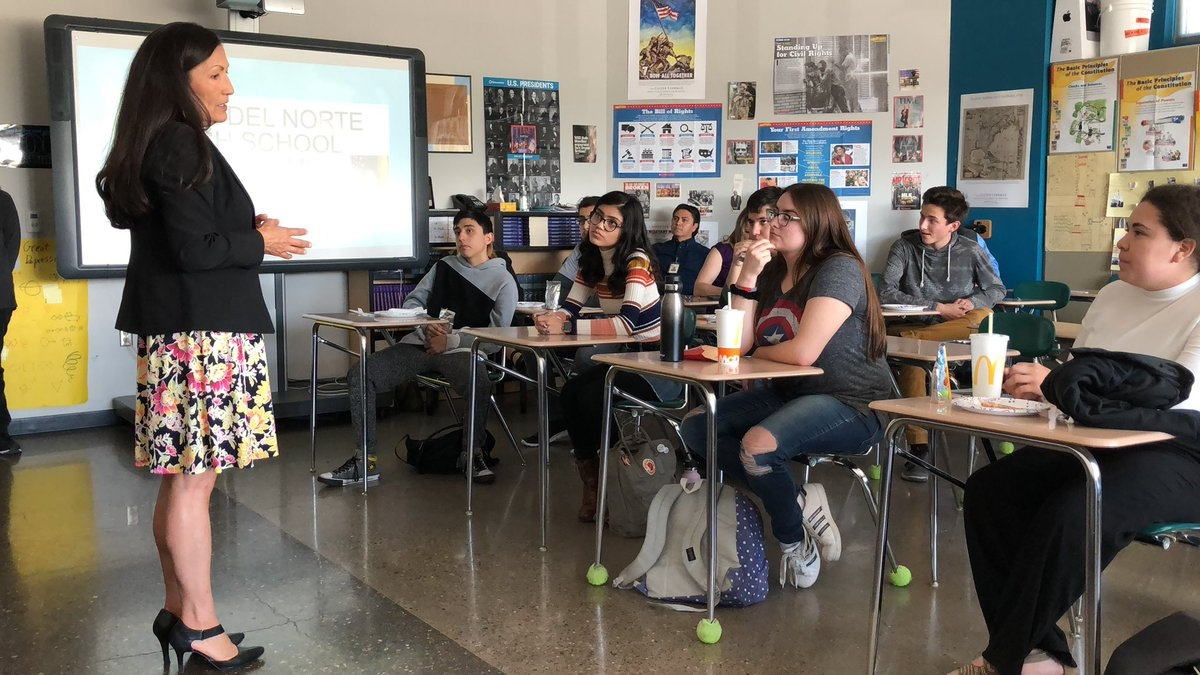
Congressmember Deb Haaland addressing students in 2019.

Construction of the new main building was completed in May, 2012. During the "A Knight to Remember" event in June, 2012, public tours of the new buildings were given by students and staff.

== Athletics ==
DNHS competes in the New Mexico Activities Association 5A-District 2, which also includes Bernalillo High School, Capital High School, Espanola Valley High School and Los Alamos High School.

DNHS has won 11 State Championships from NMAA sanctioned sports and events:

NMAA STATE CHAMPIONSHIPS
Season	Sport	Number of Championships	Year		
Fall	Cross Country, Boys	2	1982, 1966		
Fall	Football	1	1974		
Fall	Wrestling	1	2001		
Spring	Co-ed Cheerleading	1	2008		
Spring	Baseball	1	1982		
Spring	Softball	2	1989, 1984		
Spring	Track & Field, Boys	3	1990, 1969, 1967		
Spring	Basketball	1	2021	Total	11

== Notable alumni ==
- Scott Bamforth, Professional basketball player, school's all-time leading scorer
- Leah Clark, voice actress affiliated with Funimation
- Darren Dalton, actor (class of 1983)
- Mark L. Donald, Navy SEAL combat corpsman, one of the most decorated heroes of the War on Terror (class of 1985)
- Carlos Etheredge, NFL tight end
- Karen Montoya, member of the New Mexico Public Regulation Commission
- Diego Sanchez, NMAA Wrestling State Champion; professional mixed martial artist, Won The Ultimate Fighter 1, currently competing in the UFC's Lightweight Division
- Lauren Sánchez, News Anchor and actress (class of 1987)
- French Stewart, actor (class of 1982)
- Alisa Valdes-Rodriguez, Best selling author

== In popular culture ==
Del Norte High School is mentioned in the novel Killing Mr. Griffin by Lois Duncan as the high school where the main characters go to school.
