= Theresa Becenti-Aguilar =

American politician

Member of the New Mexico Public Regulation Commission from the 4th district
- In office January 1, 2019 – January 1, 2023
- Preceded by: Lynda Lovejoy
- Succeeded by: Position abolished
- In office July 6, 2010 – January 1, 2015
- Preceded by: Carol K. Sloan
- Succeeded by: Lynda Lovejoy

Personal details
- Born: Navajo Nation
- Party: Democratic

Theresa Becenti‐Aguilar is an American politician. She served as a member of the New Mexico Public Regulation Commission from the 4th district, which includes all of Cibola, McKinley and San Juan Counties and parts of Bernalillo, Rio Arriba, Sandoval, Santa Fe, and Socorro Counties.

== Early life and education ==
Born and raised in Coyote Canyon on the Navajo Nation Indian Reservation, Becenti-Aguilar earned an accounting certificate from Santa Fe Business College and a paralegal certificate from Santa Fe Community College. In addition, she is a New Mexico Certified Advocate in Public Ethics, earned through New Mexico State University's Cooperative Extension Service.

== Career ==
Becenti-Aguilar interned with the Bureau of Land Management before working for Tom Udall, first during his tenure as attorney general of New Mexico, then in the United States House of Representatives as a constituent services representative for tribal relations. In November 2006, she was hired as Native American liaison to the New Mexico Public Regulation Commission, the first to hold the position.

In June 2010, Becenti-Aguilar won the Democratic nomination for public regulation commissioner from the 4th district, defeating three other candidates, with 36%. When incumbent Commissioner Carol Sloan was removed from office by the New Mexico Supreme Court following felony convictions for battery and burglary, Governor Bill Richardson appointed Becenti-Aguilar to the seat and was subsequently elected in November with 55%.

Becenti-Aguilar lost renomination in 2014 to former commissioner and State Senator Lynda Lovejoy 46-32%, with a third candidate taking 22%. Becenti-Aguilar ran again in 2018, narrowly defeating Lovejoy and Janene Yazzie, 35-33-32%. She subsequently won the general election unopposed. Becenti-Aguilar's service on the commission ended December 31, 2022 after a constitutional amendment converting the commission from an elected to an appointed body went into effect.

== See also ==
- Native American women in politics
