= Mark L. Donald =

Retired United States Navy SEAL (born 1967)

- Born: 1967 (age 58–59)
- Military career
- Allegiance: United States of America
- Branch: United States Navy; United States Marine Corps
- Service years: 1985–2009
- Rank: Lieutenant
- Unit: United States Navy SEALs
- Wars: Global War on Terrorism; Iraq War; Operation Enduring Freedom
- Awards: Navy Cross; Silver Star; Bronze Star with Combat "V"

Mark L. Donald (born 1967) is a retired United States Navy SEAL, hospital corpsman, and physician assistant who served in the United States Navy. Donald is one of the few American warriors to have earned three high-level combat valor medals for displaying the highest levels of battlefield heroism on more than one occasion. Donald, a recipient of the Navy Cross and Silver Star awards in support of Operation Enduring Freedom during the fall of 2003 and the Bronze Star with V device denoting combat heroism for Operation Iraqi Freedom during the spring of 2003, is one of the most decorated heroes of the war on terror.

== Career ==
Donald a 1985 Del Norte High School (New Mexico) graduate, enlisted in the United States Marine Corps at the age 17. He graduated from Marine Corps Recruit Depot San Diego before completing Amphibious Reconnaissance School, Army Airborne and Navy SCUBA School. Donald was interested in medicine and after learning the Marines did not have medical training, transferred into the Navy to study medicine and become a Navy SEAL corpsman. Donald received orders to Basic Underwater Demolition/SEAL training (BUD/S) at Naval Amphibious Base Coronado. After months of training, Donald graduated with BUD/S class 159 in 1989 and received his first operational assignment to SEAL TEAM TWO at Naval Amphibious Base Little Creek, Va. Following advanced SEAL operator training and completion of six month probationary period, he received the NEC 5326 as a Combatant Swimmer (SEAL), entitled to wear the Special Warfare insignia. In 1996 he was selected for the Intra-service Physician Assistant Program. Donald graduated in 1999 from the University of Nebraska–Lincoln with a Bachelor of Science and a commission as a Medical Service Corps Officer. He earned a master's degree in physician assistant studies from the University of Nebraska–Lincoln.

In 2003, Donald's convoy came under attack. During the attack, Donald returned fire, attended the wounded, arranged for medical evacuations, and took command of a disorganized Afghan army squad he ordered to break the ambush. He continued to provide emergency medical treatment until medical evacuations were completed. Donald was awarded the Navy Cross and Silver Star for his heroic actions in 2003. His military decorations also include the Bronze Star with "V" for combat heroism, the Purple Heart, the Honduran Medal of Merit and various other personal, unit and campaign awards.

Donald wrote about his experience as a combat medic and his struggles with posttraumatic stress disorder in Battle Ready: Memoir of a SEAL Warrior. He is President of JIC Global, a Virginia-based consulting firm specializing in global health, workforce development and cross-cultural outreach strategies.

=== Prohibited release ===
In 2008, the Navy Times investigated a medical officer who had been secretly awarded a Navy Cross after receiving a redacted version of the award citation. Initially, it was believed to be a case of "stolen valor", but the Navy Times ran the article after a reporter noted that seven service members were cited in Navy records as receiving a Navy Cross but only six were identified. Donald's citation, was not classified; however, his name had been redacted from the Navy Cross as well as the Silver Star he was awarded for each action. In 2008, a spokeswoman for the Navy Secretary Donald C. Winter told the Navy Times that the name had been redacted to protect the individual and their family. Donald agreed to an interview with the Navy Times in 2009 after his name and assignment were leaked. Donald's story is the first known case of "prohibited release" of an award citation.

=== Awards and decorations ===
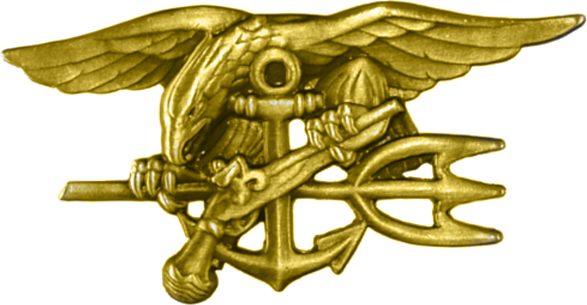

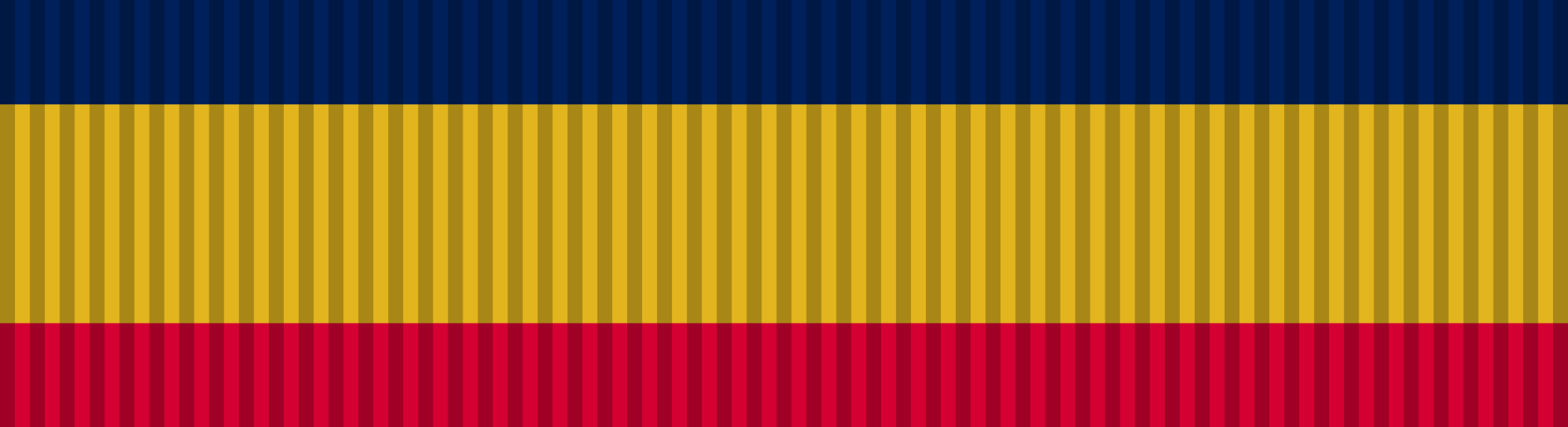

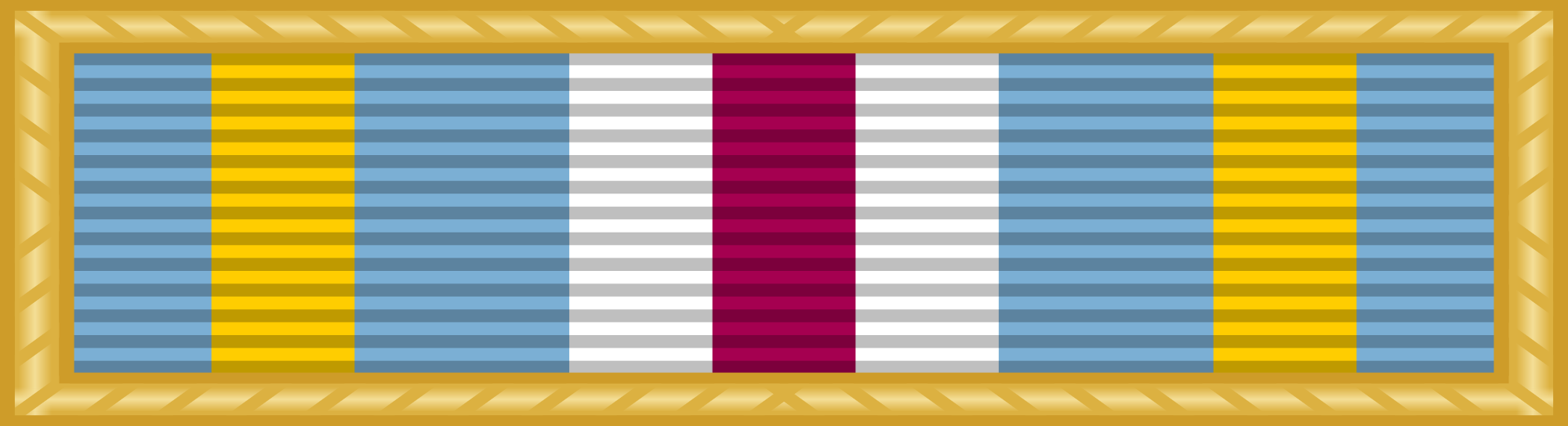

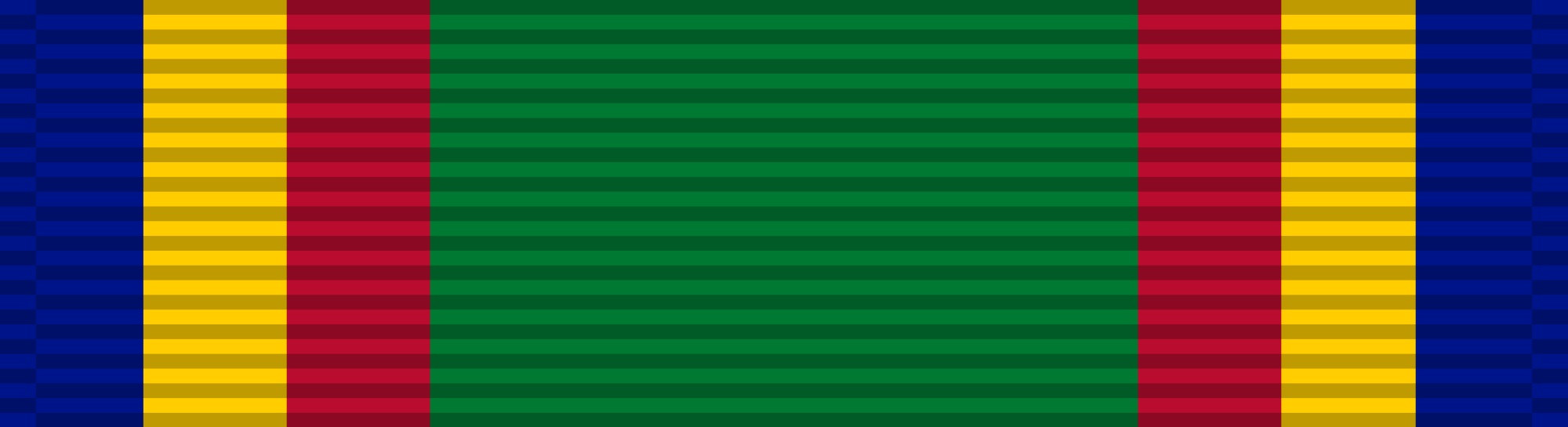

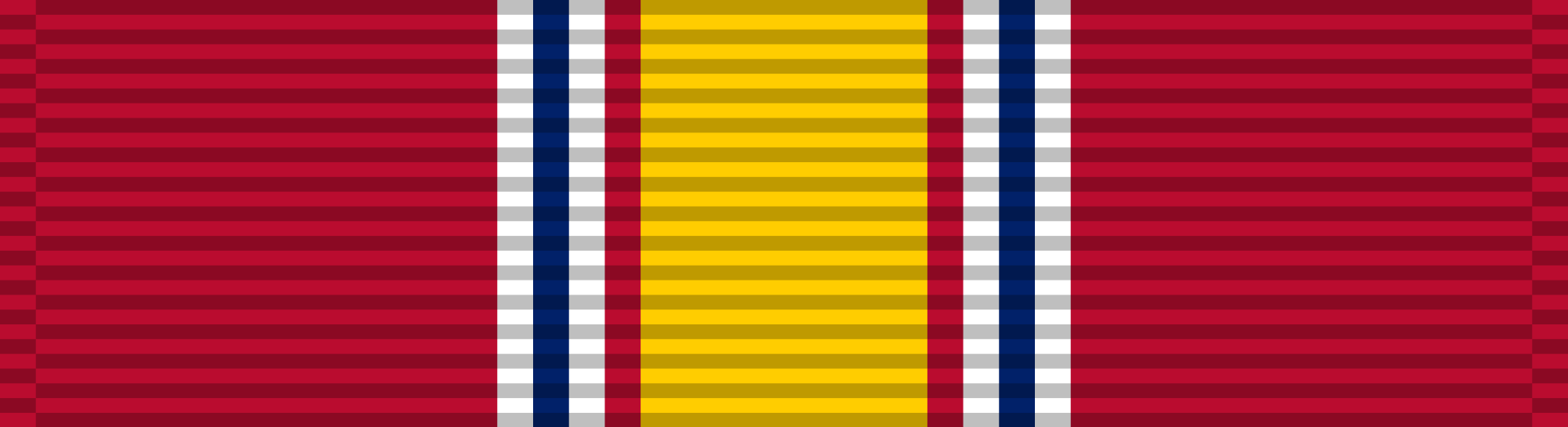

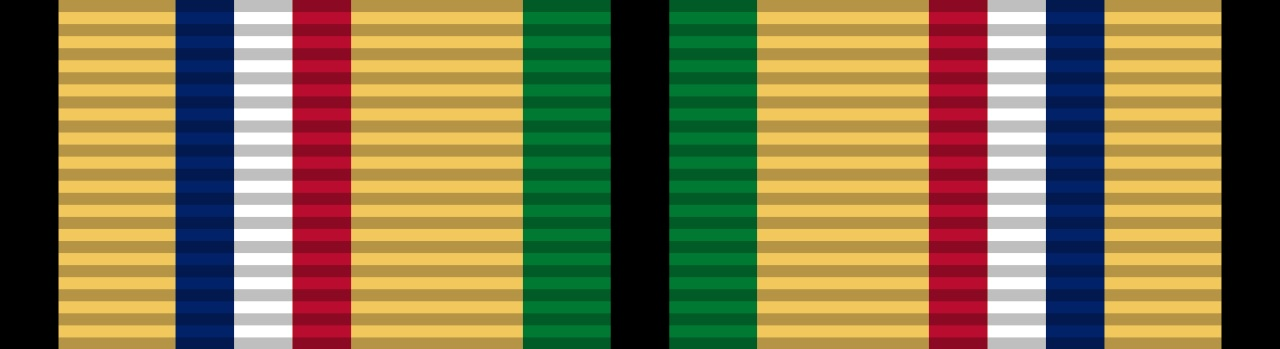

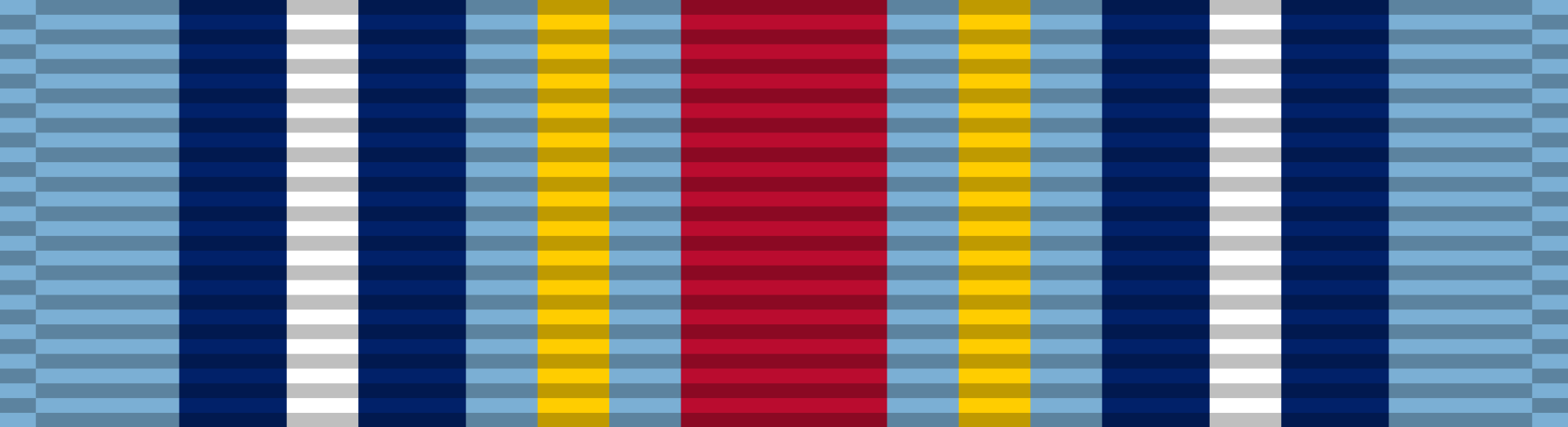

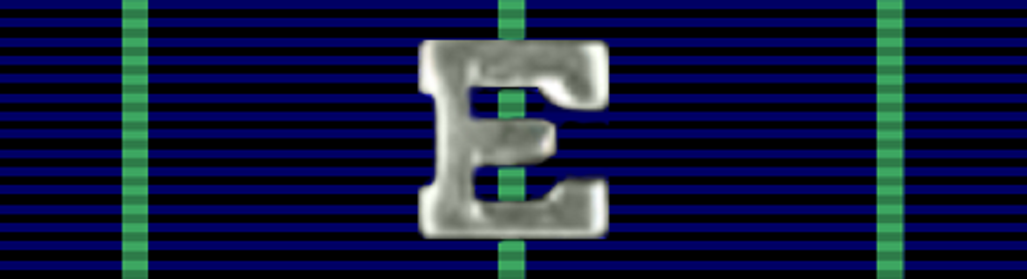

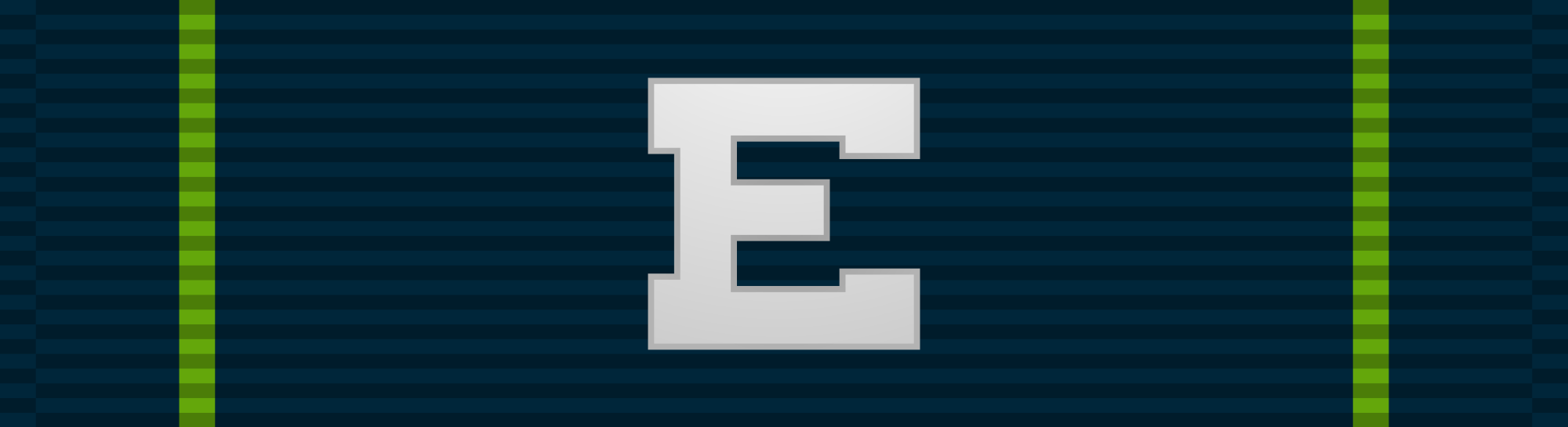

Badge	Special Warfare Insignia			
1st Row	Navy Cross			
2nd Row	Silver Star	Bronze Star Medal w/ Combat "V" device	Purple Heart	Meritorious Service Medal
3rd Row	Navy and Marine Corps Commendation Medal w/ one 5/16 inch star	Navy and Marine Corps Achievement Medal w/ Combat "V" device and one 5/16 inch star	Combat Action Ribbon w/ one 5/16 inch star	Presidential Unit Citation
4th Row	Joint Meritorious Unit Award	Navy Unit Commendation	Navy Good Conduct Medal	National Defense Service Medal
5th Row	Southwest Asia Service Medal	Afghanistan Campaign Medal	Iraq Campaign Medal	Global War on Terrorism Expeditionary Medal
6th Row	Global War on Terrorism Service Medal	Sea Service Deployment Ribbon w/ 4 bronze 3/16 Service star	Navy Rifle Marksmanship Medal	Navy Pistol Marksmanship Medal
Badge	Navy and Marine Corps Parachutist Insignia			

== Navy Cross Citation ==
Navy Cross

The President of the United States

Takes Pleasure in Presenting The Navy Cross To

Mark L. Donald

Lieutenant, United States Navy

For Services as Set Forth in the Following Citation:

For extraordinary heroism as Medical Officer assigned to a Joint Operational Unit conducting combat operations against Al Qaida and Taliban enemy forces in support of Operation ENDURING FREEDOM, in October 2003. Lieutenant Donald was part of a multi-vehicle mounted patrol ambushed by extremely heavy fire from rocket-propelled grenades and small arms. When two rocket-propelled grenades exploded immediately in front of his vehicle, Lieutenant Donald exited the vehicle and began returning fire. While under heavy and continuous machine gun fire he pulled the wounded Afghan commander to relative safety behind the vehicle's engine block. He left his position, completely exposing himself to the small arms fire, and pulled a wounded American trapped behind the steering wheel to cover behind the vehicle. He covered the wounded with his own body while returning fire and providing care. In the process, multiple bullets passed through his clothing and equipment. Identifying wounded Afghan personnel in the two lead vehicles, Lieutenant Donald moved to their aid under heavy fire and began medical treatment. After treating the wounded, he took charge of an Afghan squad in disarray, deployed them to break the ambush, and continued to treat numerous critically injured personnel, while arranging for their prompt medical evacuation. That afternoon, while sweeping an area of earlier action, a U.S./Afghan element was ambushed by a platoon-sized enemy force near Lieutenant Donald's position. Knowing personnel were gravely wounded, Lieutenant Donald without hesitation and with complete disregard for his own safety ran 200 meters between opposing forces exposing him to withering and continuous heavy machine gun and small arms fire to render medical treatment to two wounded personnel, one Afghan and one American. He placed himself between the casualties and the extremely heavy enemy fire now directed at him and began emergency medical treatment. Still under intense enemy fire, wounded by shrapnel, and knowingly within dangerously close range of attacking U.S. Army AH-64 Apache helicopter rockets, he organized the surviving Afghan soldiers and led a 200-meter fighting withdrawal to friendly positions. Lieutenant Donald coordinated the medical evacuation of wounded soldiers and withdrew overland back to base before treating his own wounds. By his heroic display of decisive and tenacious leadership, unyielding courage in the face of constant enemy fire, and utmost devotion to duty, Lieutenant Donald reflected great credit upon himself and upheld the highest traditions of the United States Naval Service.

== Silver Star Citation ==
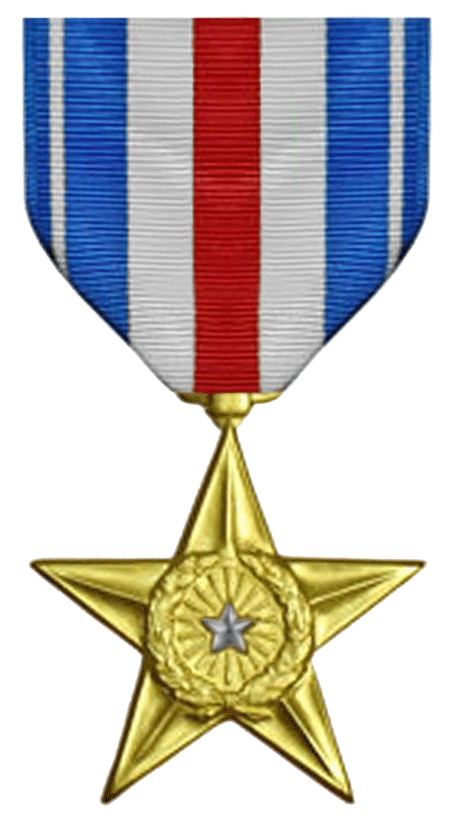
Silver Star Medal

The President of the United States

Takes Pleasure in Presenting The Silver Star To

Mark L. Donald

Lieutenant, United States Navy

For Services as Set Forth in the Following Citation:

For conspicuous gallantry and intrepidity in action while assigned to a joint operational unit conducting combat operations against Al Qa'ida and Taliban forces in support of Operation ENDURING FREEDOM. In November 2003, Lieutenant Donald was part of a multiple vehicle mounted patrol caught in an ambush by extremely heavy rocket-propelled grenades and small arms fire. The vehicle immediately in front of Lieutenant Donald's was disabled by enemy fire, trapping his vehicle in the kill zone. Lieutenant Donald exited his vehicle and immediately provided covering fire for the rest of his team members as they exited the vehicle. He took charge of the Afghan soldiers from two stopped vehicles, organized them while under enemy fire, and directed their effective fire against the ambushers. He coordinated the extraction of the trapped patrol members with the rest of the patrol, and provided covering fire as they trapped Afghan soldiers re-mounted the vehicles. Under extremely heavy enemy machine gun fire, Lieutenant Donald placed himself in the driver's seat of the lead vehicle. Despite a rapidly increasing volume of enemy fire, Lieutenant Donald led the trapped soldiers 300 meters out of the kill zone to a position of cover. He then coordinated covering fire and led a further movement under enemy fire to a position of relative safety. Lieutenant Donald immediately began emergency medical care for a wounded Afghan soldier and arranged prompt medical evacuation. By his heroic display of decisive leadership, unyielding courage in the face of constant enemy fire, and utmost devotion to duty, Lieutenant Donald reflected great credit upon himself and upheld the highest traditions of the United States Naval Service.
