= Sandy R. Jones =

American politician

Member of the New Mexico Public Regulation Commission from the 5th district
- In office January 1, 2015 – January 1, 2019
- Preceded by: Ben L. Hall
- Succeeded by: Stephen Fischmann
- In office January 1, 2007 – January 1, 2011
- Preceded by: E. Shirley Baca
- Succeeded by: Ben L. Hall

Personal details
- Born: Corrales, New Mexico
- Party: Democratic
- Occupation: Businessman

Sandy R. Jones is an American politician from New Mexico. He is a former member of the New Mexico Public Regulation Commission from the 5th district, covering all of Catron, Doña Ana, Grant, Hidalgo, Luna, Sierra, and Valencia Counties and parts of Lincoln, Otero, Socorro, and Torrance Counties.

== Early life and education ==
Born and raised on his family's farm in Corrales, New Mexico, Jones was active in 4-H and Future Farmers of America and graduated from West Mesa High School in Albuquerque.

== Career ==
Jones was an assistant chief and training officer with Corrales Volunteer Fire Department for five years. For thirty years, he has owned and operated a road construction company. In 1992, he and his family moved to Williamsburg, New Mexico.

In 2006, Jones ran for Public Regulation Commissioner from the 5th district, defeating incumbent E. Shirley Baca in the Democratic primary, and subsequently won the general election over Republican nominee C. Earl Greer. He was chosen to be chairman of the commission in 2009. In 2010, he ran for commissioner of public lands, but lost the Democratic primary to former Commissioner Ray Powell.

Jones again ran for Public Regulation Commission in 2014, narrowly winning the Democratic primary 50.3-49.7% over Merrie Lee Soules, and defeating incumbent Republican Ben L. Hall in the general election 51-49%. He was again chosen to chair the commission in 2017. Running for a third term in 2018, he lost the Democratic primary to former state Senator Stephen Fischmann 52-48%.
