= Karen Montoya =

American politician

Member of the New Mexico Public Regulation Commission from the 1st district
- In office January 1, 2013 – January 1, 2017
- Preceded by: Jason A. Marks
- Succeeded by: Cynthia B. Hall

Bernalillo County Assessor
- In office January 1, 2007 – January 1, 2013
- Preceded by: Mark J. Carrillo
- Succeeded by: Tanya Giddings

Personal details
- Born: c. 1965
- Party: Democratic

Karen Louise Montoya is an American politician from New Mexico. She is a former member of the New Mexico Public Regulation Commission from the 1st district, covering parts of Bernalillo County.

Montoya graduated from Del Norte High School in Albuquerque in 1984. She completed coursework at the University of New Mexico, Albuquerque Technical Vocational Institute, and the International Association of Assessing Officers to qualify in becoming a certified appraiser in New Mexico. She began work in the Bernalillo County Assessor's Office in 1991, serving as chair of the County Valuation Protest Board, and in 2004 became a senior appraiser in the New Mexico Property Tax Division. She was first elected Bernalillo County Assessor in 2006, and re-elected in 2010.

In 2012, Montoya entered the race for Public Regulation Commissioner from the 1st district to succeed Jason Marks, who was term limited. Two months before the Democratic primary, a state district judge removed Montoya from the ballot for failing to provide the district she was running in on her nominating petition, however the state Supreme Court reversed that decision on appeal. She won the primary, besting government attorney Cynthia B. Hall and state Representative Al Park 36-33-31%, and went on to defeat Republican nominee Christopher Ocksrider in the general election 55-45%. Montoya was chosen to be Chairwoman of the Commission in 2015. Running for a second term in 2016, she lost the Democratic primary to 2012 runner-up Cynthia Hall 57-43%.
