= Ben L. Hall =

American politician

Member of the New Mexico Public Regulation Commission from the 5th district
- In office January 1, 2011 – January 1, 2015
- Preceded by: Sandy R. Jones
- Succeeded by: Sandy R. Jones

Personal details
- Party: Republican
- Occupation: Businessman

Ben L. Hall is an American politician who served as a member of the New Mexico Public Regulation Commission from the 5th district, covering all of Catron, Doña Ana, Grant, Hidalgo, Luna, Sierra, and Valencia Counties and parts of Lincoln, Otero, Socorro, and Torrance Counties.

== Education ==
Hall graduated from Ruidoso High School and attended New Mexico Western College for one semester.

== Career ==
He served three terms in the New Mexico House of Representatives and two terms on the Lincoln County Commission. For forty years, he owned and operated a general building construction company.

In 2010, Hall entered the race for Public Regulation Commissioner from the 5th district, seeking to succeed Sandy R. Jones, a Democrat. He won the Republican nomination over three other candidates with 36%, and defeated the Democratic nominee, Doña Ana County Commissioner Bill McCamley, 51-49% in the general election. He was chosen to be Chairman of the Commission in 2013 and served as president of the Western Conference of Public Utility Commissioners the same year. Running for a second term in 2014, he lost to his predecessor, Jones, 51-49%. He again ran in 2018, narrowly winning the Republican nomination over two other candidates with 36%, but lost the general election to former Democratic state Senator Stephen Fischmann 54-46%.
