= Stephen Fischmann =

American politician

Member of the New Mexico Public Regulation Commission from the 5th district
- In office January 1, 2019 – January 1, 2023
- Preceded by: Sandy R. Jones
- Succeeded by: Position abolished

Member of the New Mexico Senate from the 37th district
- In office January 13, 2009 – January 15, 2013
- Preceded by: Leonard Lee Rawson
- Succeeded by: William Soules

Personal details
- Party: Democratic
- Spouse: Gail Katayanagi
- Education: University of California, Los Angeles (B.A., M.B.A.)

Stephen H. Fischmann is an American politician from New Mexico. He was a member of the New Mexico Public Regulation Commission from the 5th district, covering all of Catron, Doña Ana, Grant, Hidalgo, Luna, Sierra, and Valencia Counties and parts of Lincoln, Otero, Socorro, and Torrance Counties.

== Education ==
Fischmann graduated from the University of California, Los Angeles in 1976 with a B.A. in political science and earned his MBA from the same institution in 1979. He was a general manager at Levi Strauss & Co. for 20 years before engaging in real estate brokering and property inspection in the San Francisco Bay Area.

== Career ==
After retiring to Southern New Mexico, he became a founding member of the Quality Growth Alliance and chairman of the Southwest Energy Alliance, a group that promotes clean and affordable energy initiatives.

== Political career ==
A Democrat, Fischmann ran for New Mexico Senate against Republican Senator Leonard Lee Rawson in 2008, narrowly winning 51-49%. He served one term representing the 37th district before retiring. In 2018, he ran for Public Regulation Commissioner from the 5th district, defeating incumbent Sandy R. Jones 52-48% in the Democratic primary. He won the general election over the Republican nominee, former Commissioner Ben L. Hall, 54-46%. Fischmann's service on the commission ended January 1, 2023, after a constitutional amendment converting the commission from an elected body to an appointed body went into effect.
