= Cynthia B. Hall =

American politician (born 1951)

Commissioner of the New Mexico Public Regulation Commission from the 1st district
- In office January 1, 2017 – January 1, 2023
- Preceded by: Karen Montoya
- Succeeded by: Position abolished

Commissioner of the Bernalillo County Planning Commission
- In office 2006–2008

Personal details
- Born: Cynthia Mitchell Black; December 7, 1951 (age 74)
- Party: Democratic
- Spouse: Alan Hall
- Education: Washington University in St. Louis (BA); Saint Louis University (MS); Southwestern Law School (JD); University of New Mexico (EMBA)

Cynthia Black Hall (born December 7, 1951) is an American politician, attorney, and scientist from New Mexico. She was a member of the New Mexico Public Regulation Commission from the 1st district, covering parts of Bernalillo County.

== Education ==
Hall graduated from Washington University in St. Louis in 1973 with a Bachelor of Arts degree in biology, and from Saint Louis University in 1977 with a Master of Science in physiology.

She received her Juris Doctor from Southwestern Law School in 1983, and attended one year of an executive MBA at the UNM Anderson School of Management in 2010 and 2011.

== Career ==
Hall has worked as a laboratory research technician, graduate teaching assistant, nurse instructor, contract researcher, and research supervisor.

After service as a law clerk and briefly working in private law, Hall served in a number of governmental legal positions, including assistant counsel at the New Mexico Department of Energy and Minerals, licensing bureau chief at the New Mexico Regulation and Licensing Department, and assistant staff counsel at the New Mexico Public Service Commission. She was an assistant counsel in the office of the General Counsel of the Navy from 1988 to 1990, and an attorney in the general counsel's office of Sandia National Laboratories from 1990 to 1994. She began work for the New Mexico Public Regulation Commission as an associate general counsel from 2008 to 2010, than as staff attorney in the Insurance Division from 2010 to 2012.

In 2012, Hall entered the race for Public Regulation Commissioner from the 1st district to succeed Jason Marks, who was term limited. She came second in the Democratic primary behind Bernalillo County Assessor Karen Montoya, taking 33% to Montoya's 36% and state Representative Al Park's 31%. She challenged Montoya again in 2016, this time defeating her 57-43%, and winning the general election unopposed. Hall's service on the commission ended December 31, 2022 after a constitutional amendment converting the commission from an elected to an appointed body went into effect.
