= Moussa Diagne =

Spanish-Senegalese basketball player

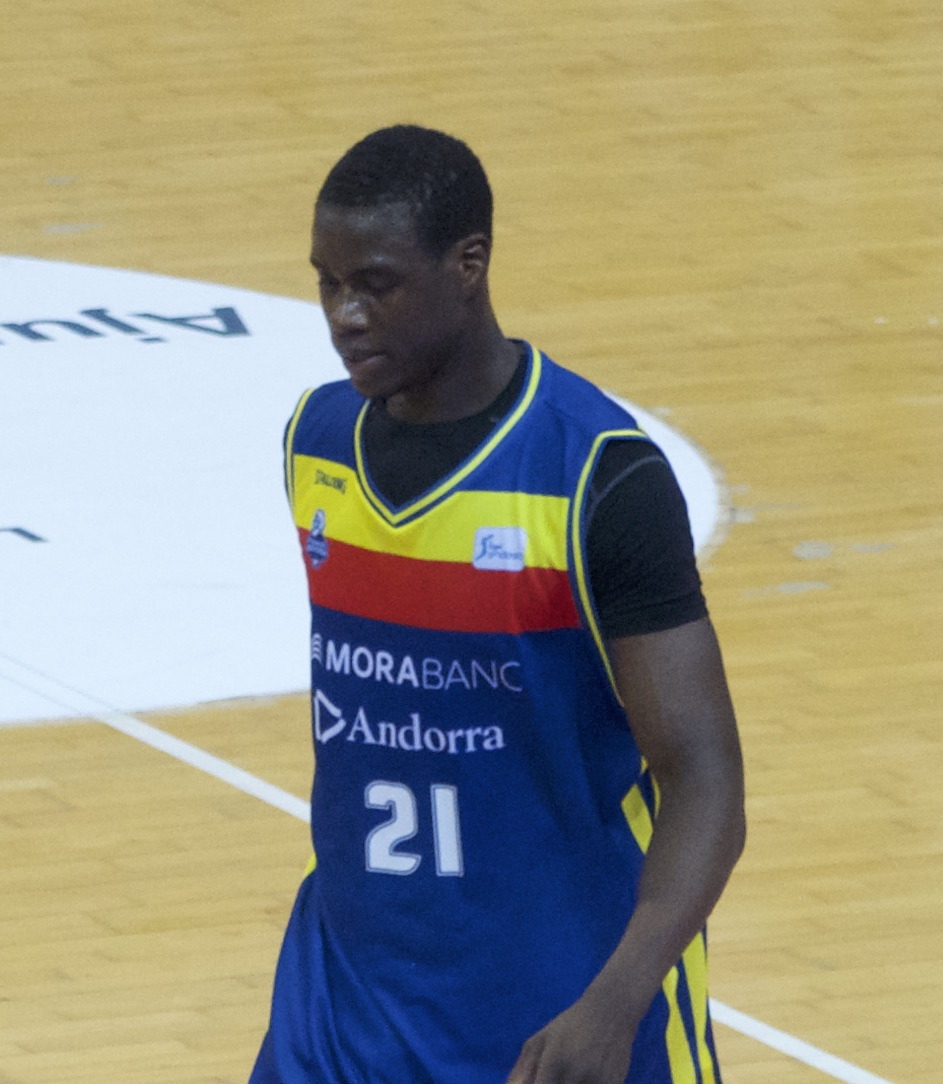

No. 21 – UCAM Murcia
- Position: Center
- League: Liga ACB

Personal information
- Born: March 6, 1994 (age 32) Guédiawaye, Senegal
- Listed height: 6 ft 11 in (2.11 m)
- Listed weight: 225 lb (102 kg)

Career information
- NBA draft: 2015: undrafted
- Playing career: 2012–present

Career history
- 2012–2015: Fuenlabrada
- 2012: →Óbila
- 2015–2018: FC Barcelona
- 2016–2017: →Fuenlabrada
- 2017–2018: →Andorra
- 2018–2022: Andorra
- 2022–2023: Canarias
- 2023–present: UCAM Murcia

Career highlights
- FIBA Intercontinental Cup champion (2023)

Cheikh Moussa Diagné Ly (born March 6, 1994) is a Senegalese professional basketball player for UCAM Murcia of the Liga ACB. He is a center, but he can also play as a power forward. He was listed as one of the top international prospects for the 2015 NBA draft, but went undrafted.

== Early life ==
Diagne was born on March 6, 1994, and was brought up in Guédiawaye, Senegal. He was discovered at a basketball camp in Rufisque by head coach David Sanz of the Spanish amateur basketball powerhouse, Baloncesto Torrejón. In the spring of 2011, at age 17, Diagne moved to Madrid, Spain in an attempt to compete with Torrejón. He only had little experience playing the game prior to arriving in Europe, however. Diagne played in local tournaments and the Spanish fourth division.

== Professional career ==
After Diagne finished developing his talents with Torrejón, in 2013, he was signed by the Liga ACB's Baloncesto Fuenlabrada. Despite joining Fuenlabrada, Diagne played with the Ávila-based professional club, Óbila CB, of the LEB Plata, for the majority of his first year. He also competed in Eurobasket Summer League for La Serna. Despite being a slight prospect for the event, he withdrew from the 2014 NBA draft.

On July 21, 2015, Diagne signed a three-year deal with the Spanish club FC Barcelona Lassa.

On August 8, 2017, FC Barcelona loaned him to MoraBanc Andorra for the 2017–18 season. On June 29, 2018, Barcelona parted ways with him.

On July 20, 2018, Diagne signed a two-year deal with the Spanish club MoraBanc Andorra.

On August 2, 2022, he signed with Tenerife of the Liga ACB.
