= Jonathan Holmes (basketball) =

American basketball player

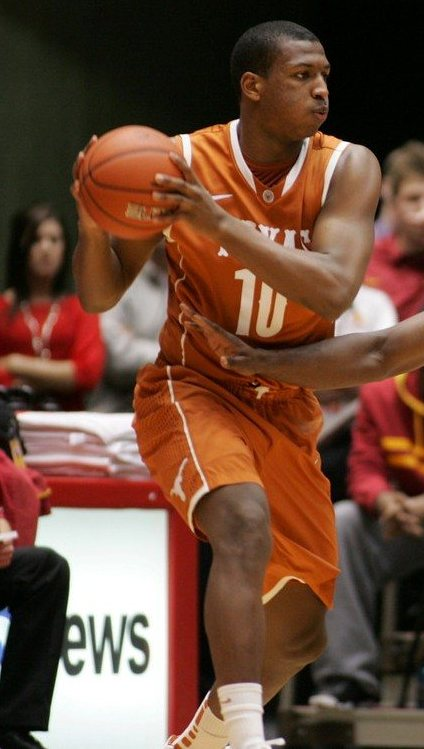
- Holmes with Texas, 2012

Personal information
- Born: December 9, 1992 (age 33) San Antonio, Texas, U.S.
- Listed height: 6 ft 8 in (2.03 m)
- Listed weight: 240 lb (109 kg)

Career information
- High school: Antonian College Prep (San Antonio, Texas)
- College: Texas (2011–2015)
- NBA draft: 2015: undrafted
- Playing career: 2016–2022
- Position: Power forward / center

Career history
- 2016–2017: FC Barcelona Lassa
- 2017: Canton Charge
- 2017–2018: Maine Red Claws
- 2018: Hapoel Tel Aviv
- 2019: Yokohama B-Corsairs
- 2020: Real Canoe NC
- 2021: Kumanovo
- 2021–2022: KK Šentjur

Career highlights
- Second-team All-Big 12 (2014)
- Stats at Basketball Reference
Medals
Men's basketball
Representing United States
FIBA AmeriCup
Gold medal – first place	2017 Argentina

Jonathan Alexander Holmes (born December 9, 1992) is an American former professional basketball player. He played college basketball for the Texas Longhorns.

== High school career ==
Holmes attended Antonian College Prep in San Antonio, Texas. As a junior in 2009–10, he averaged 24.2 points, 9.8 rebounds and 3.2 blocks per game while leading Antonian to the TAPPS 5A state semifinals. As a senior in 2010–11, he averaged 23.4 points, 8.7 rebounds and 2.9 blocks per game while helping Antonian to a 16–13 mark.

== College career ==
Holmes played four seasons of college basketball for the University of Texas, averaging 9.2 points and 5.9 rebounds in 23.1 minutes over 127 career games. He was named All-Big 12 Second Team and team MVP as a junior after averaging 12.8 points, 7.2 rebounds and 1.3 blocks on 50.5% shooting, and was an All-Big 12 Honorable mention as a senior with averages of 10.3 points, 6.1 rebounds and 1.0 blocks per game.

== Professional career ==
After going undrafted in the 2015 NBA draft, Holmes joined the Boston Celtics for the 2015 NBA Summer League. In eight games (seven starts) for the Celtics, he averaged 10 points and five rebounds in 20 minutes per game. On August 13, 2015, he signed with the Los Angeles Lakers. However, he was later waived by the Lakers on October 23, 2015, after appearing in two preseason games. During his second preseason game, he tore his right labrum and was ruled out for six months.

In July 2016, Holmes joined the Memphis Grizzlies for the 2016 NBA Summer League. In five games for the Grizzlies, he averaged 6.6 points, 6.2 rebounds and 1.4 blocks in 23.2 minutes per game. On September 26, 2016, he signed with the Cleveland Cavaliers. However, he was later waived by the Cavaliers on October 20 after appearing in six preseason games. On November 1, he was acquired by the Canton Charge of the NBA Development League as an affiliate player of the Cavaliers, and three days later, he left Canton to sign a two-month contract with FC Barcelona Lassa. Following the expiration of his contract, he parted ways with Barcelona on January 7, 2017. In 10 games, he averaged 7.7 points and 3.7 rebounds in 18.1 minutes per game.

On January 11, 2017, Holmes was reacquired by the Canton Charge and the next day, he made his debut for the Charge in a 109–105 loss to the Santa Cruz Warriors, recording two rebounds in eight minutes off the bench. He was traded by the Charge to the Maine Red Claws on September 25, 2017.

On August 6, 2018, Holmes signed with the Israeli team Hapoel Tel Aviv for the 2018–19 season. However, on November 10, 2018, Holmes parted ways with Hapoel after appearing in six games.

For the 2019–20 season, Holmes joined the Austin Spurs of the G League for training camp, but did not make the final roster. He joined Kumanovo of the Macedonian league in 2021, averaging 11.9 points, 6.1 rebounds, 1.5 assists and 1.3 steals per game. On November 30, 2021, Holmes signed with KK Šentjur of the Premier A Slovenian Basketball League.

== International career ==
Holmes was a member of the senior United States national team at the 2017 FIBA AmeriCup, where he won a gold medal.

== Personal life ==
Holmes is the son of Daryl and Angela Holmes. His father, Daryl, played football at the University of Nebraska–Lincoln, lettering in 1980 as a defensive end. Holmes' older sister, Amber, played basketball for four years at Southeast Missouri State (2009–12), while his younger brother, Sterling, attended Richland College in Dallas, then transferred to Texas Lutheran University in Seguin.
