= Scott Bamforth =

American-Kosovan basketball player (born 1989)

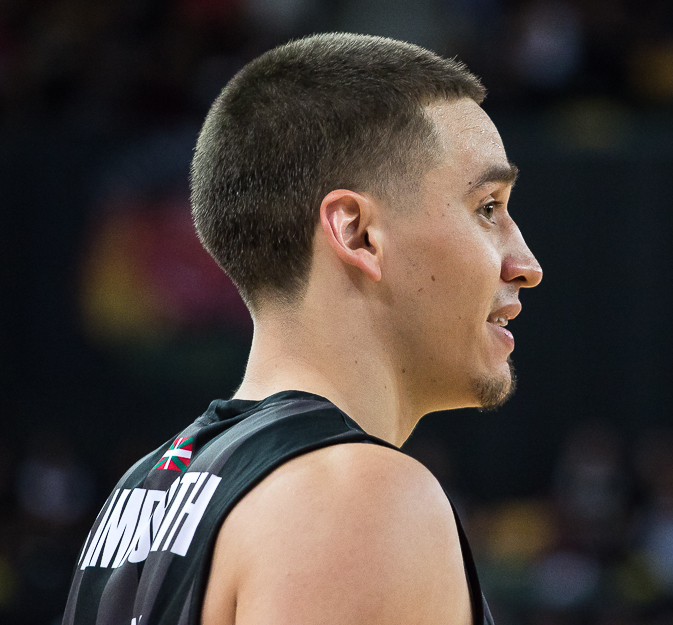

No. 4 – Fuerza Regia de Monterrey
- Position: Shooting guard
- League: LNBP

Personal information
- Born: August 12, 1989 (age 37) Albuquerque, New Mexico, U.S.
- Listed height: 6 ft 2 in (1.88 m)
- Listed weight: 190 lb (86 kg)

Career information
- High school: Del Norte (Albuquerque, New Mexico)
- College: Western Nebraska CC (2008–2009); Weber State (2010–2013)
- NBA draft: 2013: undrafted
- Playing career: 2013–present

Career history
- 2013–2014: Sevilla
- 2014–2015: UCAM Murcia
- 2015–2016: Sevilla
- 2016–2017: Bilbao Basket
- 2017–2019: Dinamo Sassari
- 2019–2020: Budućnost
- 2020–2022: Le Mans
- 2022–2023: Río Breogán
- 2023–2024: Victoria Libertas Pesaro
- 2024–2025: Granada
- 2025: Fuerza Regia de Monterrey
- 2026: Golden Eagle Ylli
- 2026–present: Fuerza Regia de Monterrey

Career highlights
- Liga Unike winner (2026); LNB Pro A Three-point Contest champion (2022); FIBA Europe Cup champion (2019); 2× First-team All-Big Sky (2011, 2013); Second-team All-Big Sky (2012); Big Sky Newcomer of the Year (2011)

Scott Douglas Bamforth (born August 12, 1989) is an American-Kosovan professional basketball player for Fuerza Regia de Monterrey of the Liga Nacional de Baloncesto Profesional (LNBP). He played college basketball at Western Nebraska CC and Weber State. Standing at 6 ft 2 in (1.88 m), he plays at the shooting guard position.

In 2022, the Albuquerque Journal said that Bamforth had "[strung] together one of the most accomplished professional basketball careers ever for a New Mexico-born player".

== Early life ==
Bamforth was born on August 12, 1989, in Albuquerque, New Mexico, to John Bamforth and Elizabeth Vallejos. He is of Mexican descent through his mother. After his father died of a heart attack when he was 12 years old in 2002, Bamforth was left to care for his ill mother, often missing school to tend to her daily needs. "I pretty much stopped going to school," he said. "It was take care of my mom and go to practice and that was about it." She eventually moved to Hatch, New Mexico, about three hours away to live with her mother, leaving Bamforth alone in Albuquerque. She later died of liver damage in December 2004, and Bamforth moved in with a friend of the family.

== High school career ==
Bamforth attended Del Norte High School in Albuquerque, where he starred on the basketball team. As a junior, he led the Knights to a No. 1 seed in the class 4A state tournament, as well as their first-ever appearance in the state championship game, where he scored 15 points in a loss to district rival St. Pius X. Bamforth earned first-team all-state honors after guiding the team to a school-record 23 wins.

Bamforth served as team captain as a senior, once again leading the Knights to the No. 1 seed in the class 4A state tournament, though they were upset in the quarterfinals by Capital High School. He averaged 23.5 points, 7.8 rebounds, and 3.5 assists per game, earning first-team all-state honors and an invitation to the New Mexico North-South All-Star Game, where he scored 17 points.

Bamforth left Del Norte as the school's all-time leading scorer with 1,259 points, (Note: Bamforth's scoring record was surpassed by Shane Douma-Sanchez in 2022.) as well as the leader in both three-point and free throw shooting percentage. However, he was not recruited by any NCAA Division I programs and instead walked on at Western Nebraska Community College, a junior college in Scottsbluff, Nebraska.

== College career ==
=== Western Nebraska Community College ===
Bamforth was redshirted at Western Nebraska Community College for the 2007–08 season. "I am very happy I didn't play my first year," he later said. "It was hard not playing, and it was the first time that I didn't play in a season. But it was good because I learned a lot of things." In his first season in 2008–09, Bamforth hit 88 three-pointers and averaged 18.4 points, 4.6 rebounds and 2.3 assists per game, earning all-NJCAA Region 9 honors. The following year, he was named a preseason third-team NJCAA All-American. However, Bamforth suffered a dislocated elbow in the fifth game of the season, forcing him to miss the rest of the season. He transferred to Weber State, signing his National Letter of Intent in November 2009.

=== Weber State ===
I signed there because I think it is the perfect fit for me. I am really excited because it has always been a goal to play Division I. That is why you come to junior college — to get that chance. I was lucky enough to get it.

— Bamforth after signing with Weber State in November 2009.

Despite tearing his labrum during the first week of his sophomore season with Weber State, Bamforth ranked fourth in the nation with a 48.8 three-point shooting percentage, earning Big Sky Conference Newcomer of the Year honors.

Bamforth played in 99 games overall for the Wildcats, with career averages of 13.6 points, 3.2 rebounds and 2.5 assists per game. He finished 11th in scoring in school history. He earned all-conference honors each season, and set a school record with 259 career made 3-pointers, as well as the single-season record of 103. Both records were previously owned by Damian Lillard.

In March 2013, he was named to the Weber State Men's Basketball 50th Anniversary Team, as one of the school's best 50 players in its history.

== Professional career ==
Bamforth signed with Spanish team Baloncesto Sevilla in August 2013. He averaged 10.9 points and 4.3 rebounds per game in 37 games.

In August 2014, Bamforth signed with UCAM Murcia on a one-year contract, and went on to average 8.9 points and 2.2 rebounds per game in 29 games.

Bamforth rejected an offer from Baloncesto Fuenlabrada, and instead returned to Baloncesto Sevilla in August 2015 on a two-year contract.

Bamforth signed for Le Mans Sarthe Basket of the French LNB Pro A for a one-year contract on June 22, 2020. He averaged 15.8 points and 3.6 assists per game. Bamforth re-signed with Le Mans Sarthe on June 24, 2021. He won the LNB Pro A Three-point Contest in December after filling in for an injured Nicolas Lang, scoring 24 points in the final round to beat Brandon Jefferson for the title.

Bamforth signed with Rio Breogán of the Spanish Liga ACB on August 2, 2022.

On July 17, 2023, he signed with Victoria Libertas Pesaro of the Italian Lega Basket Serie A (LBA).

On April 14, 2024, he signed with Covirán Granada of the Liga ACB.

=== The Basketball Tournament (TBT) (2016–present) ===
In the summers of 2016 and 2017, Bamforth played in The Basketball Tournament on ESPN for The Wasatch Front (Weber State Alumni). He competed for the $2 million prize in 2017, and for The Wasatch Front, he scored 27 points in their first round loss to Team Challenge ALS 97–81.

For the 2022 tournament, Bamforth joined The Enchantment, a team consisting mostly of former New Mexico Lobos players. Despite being the only non-Lobo alumni on the team, he was the only player originally from New Mexico.

== Personal life ==
Bamforth met his wife, Kendra, during their time at Western Nebraska Community College. She had his first son in November 2011, named Kingzton. However, Kendrea was diagnosed with pre-eclampsia, which required an emergency C section 34 weeks into the pregnancy. When Kingzton was born, he stopped breathing and turned blue. Doctors had to resuscitate the newborn. "I thought they both pretty much were going to die because that's what they told me from the start could happen. It seemed like forever," he later said. They both survived, and in the following game against Northern New Mexico, he made five three-pointers and then made seven in a career-best 28 point performance against Utah State four days after that. The couple had two more sons: Jaxzton and Bryzton.

Bamforth has continued his friendship with former college teammate Damian Lillard.
