= New Mexico Public Regulation Commission =

U.S. state government agency

The New Mexico Public Regulation Commission or NMPRC is an independent state agency created by the New Mexico Constitution. It is charged with ensuring safe operations and reliable utility services at fair, just, and reasonable rates consistent with the State’s legal, economic, environmental, and social policies. The agency, through its Pipeline Safety Bureau, is responsible for conducting safety compliance inspections and enforcing state and federal pipeline safety regulations for intrastate gas, hazardous liquid, and CO_{2} pipeline facilities.

== History ==
The New Mexico Public Regulation Commission historically regulated the insurance industry through the Division of Insurance, appointing an Insurance Superintendent who was a NMPRC employee with statutory powers. On July 1, 2013, the Insurance Division separated from the NMPRC and became an independent state agency, the Office of the Superintendent of Insurance. The PRC was also once responsible for investigating arsons and training local fire departments through its Office of the State Fire Marshal, which is now a division of the New Mexico Department of Homeland Security and Emergency Management.

Until June 30, 2024, the NMPRC was responsible for the regulation of the motor carrier industry in New Mexico. Those responsibilities are now part of the New Mexico Department of Transportation.

== Commissioners ==
Prior to January 1, 2023, the NMPRC consisted of five commissioners elected by district for staggered four-year terms. Following approval by the voters of a 2020 constitutional amendment, the NMPRC became a three-member body appointed by the governor with Senate advice and consent for staggered six-year terms. Thus, the current duly appointed public regulation commissioners along with their technical advisors are as follows:

Commissioner	Appointment	Term Expires	Technical Advisor
Gabriel Aguilera (Chair)	2023	2027	Kai Filion
Greg Nibert	2025	2031	Angelah Magofna
Patrick O'Connell	2023	2029	Mclee Kerolle

== List of Public Regulation Commissioners ==
Years	Districts				
Years	District 1	District 2	District 3	District 4	District 5
1999	Herb H. Hughes (R)	Bill Pope (R) (Note: Resigned on March 16, 2001.)	Jerome D. Block Sr. (D)	Lynda Lovejoy (D)	Tony Schaefer (R)
2000	Herb H. Hughes (R)	Bill Pope (R)	Jerome D. Block Sr. (D)	Lynda Lovejoy (D)	Tony Schaefer (D) (Note: Changed party affiliation from Republican to Democratic on October 1, 1999.)
2001	Herb H. Hughes (R)	Bill Pope (R)	Jerome D. Block Sr. (D)	Lynda Lovejoy (D)	Tony Schaefer (D)
2001	Herb H. Hughes (R)	Rory McMinn (R) (Note: Appointed by Governor Johnson on May 1, 2001.)	Jerome D. Block Sr. (D)	Lynda Lovejoy (D)	Tony Schaefer (D)
2002	Herb H. Hughes (R)	Rory McMinn (R)	Jerome D. Block Sr. (D)	Lynda Lovejoy (D)	Tony Schaefer (D)
2003	Herb H. Hughes (R)	David W. King (R)	Jerome D. Block Sr. (D)	Lynda Lovejoy (D)	E. Shirley Baca (D)
2004	Herb H. Hughes (R)	David W. King (R)	Jerome D. Block Sr. (D)	Lynda Lovejoy (D)	E. Shirley Baca (D)
2005	Jason A. Marks (D)	David W. King (R)	Ben Ray Luján (D)	Lynda Lovejoy (D)	E. Shirley Baca (D)
2006	Jason A. Marks (D)	David W. King (R)	Ben Ray Luján (D)	Lynda Lovejoy (D)	E. Shirley Baca (D)
2007	Jason A. Marks (D)	David W. King (R)	Ben Ray Luján (D)	Carol K. Sloan (D) (Note: Removed by New Mexico Supreme Court on June 23, 2010.)	Sandy R. Jones (D)
2008	Jason A. Marks (D)	David W. King (R)	Ben Ray Luján (D)	Carol K. Sloan (D)	Sandy R. Jones (D)
2009	Jason A. Marks (D)	David W. King (R)	Jerome D. Block Jr. (D) (Note: Resigned on October 7, 2011.)	Carol K. Sloan (D)	Sandy R. Jones (D)
2010	Jason A. Marks (D)	David W. King (R)	Jerome D. Block Jr. (D)	Carol K. Sloan (D)	Sandy R. Jones (D)
2010	Jason A. Marks (D)	David W. King (R)	Jerome D. Block Jr. (D)	Theresa Becenti-Aguilar (D) (Note: Appointed by Governor Richardson and took oath on July 6, 2010.)	Sandy R. Jones (D)
2011	Jason A. Marks (D)	Patrick H. Lyons (R)	Jerome D. Block Jr. (D)	Theresa Becenti-Aguilar (D)	Ben L. Hall (R)
2011	Jason A. Marks (D)	Patrick H. Lyons (R)	Doug Howe (I) (Note: Appointed by Governor Martinez and took oath on November 7, 2011.)	Theresa Becenti-Aguilar (D)	Ben L. Hall (R)
2012	Jason A. Marks (D)	Patrick H. Lyons (R)	Doug Howe (I)	Theresa Becenti-Aguilar (D)	Ben L. Hall (R)
2013	Karen Montoya (D)	Patrick H. Lyons (R)	Valerie Espinoza (D)	Theresa Becenti-Aguilar (D)	Ben L. Hall (R)
2014	Karen Montoya (D)	Patrick H. Lyons (R)	Valerie Espinoza (D)	Theresa Becenti-Aguilar (D)	Ben L. Hall (R)
2015	Karen Montoya (D)	Patrick H. Lyons (R)	Valerie Espinoza (D)	Lynda Lovejoy (D)	Sandy R. Jones (D)
2016	Karen Montoya (D)	Patrick H. Lyons (R)	Valerie Espinoza (D)	Lynda Lovejoy (D)	Sandy R. Jones (D)
2017	Cynthia B. Hall (D)	Patrick H. Lyons (R)	Valerie Espinoza (D)	Lynda Lovejoy (D)	Sandy R. Jones (D)
2018	Cynthia B. Hall (D)	Patrick H. Lyons (R)	Valerie Espinoza (D)	Lynda Lovejoy (D)	Sandy R. Jones (D)
2019	Cynthia B. Hall (D)	Jefferson Byrd (R)	Valerie Espinoza (D)	Theresa Becenti-Aguilar (D)	Stephen Fischmann (D)
2020	Cynthia B. Hall (D)	Jefferson Byrd (R)	Valerie Espinoza (D)	Theresa Becenti-Aguilar (D)	Stephen Fischmann (D)
2021	Cynthia B. Hall (D)	Jefferson Byrd (R)	Joseph Maestas (D)	Theresa Becenti-Aguilar (D)	Stephen Fischmann (D)
2022	Cynthia B. Hall (D)	Jefferson Byrd (R)	Joseph Maestas (D)	Theresa Becenti-Aguilar (D)	Stephen Fischmann (D)

Years	Commissioner 1	Commissioner 2	Commissioner 3	Governor
2023	Gabriel Aguilera (D)	James Ellison (I)	Patrick O'Connell (D)	Michelle Lujan Grisham (D)
2024	Gabriel Aguilera (D)	James Ellison (I)	Patrick O'Connell (D)	Michelle Lujan Grisham (D)
2025	Gabriel Aguilera (D)	Greg Nibert (R)	Patrick O'Connell (D)	Michelle Lujan Grisham (D)

== See also ==
- List of company registers
