= Orcutt (surname) =

Orcutt is a surname. Notable people with the name include:

- Beth Orcutt, American oceanographer
- Bill Orcutt (born 1962), American guitarist and composer
- Charles Russell Orcutt (1864–1929), American botanist
- Ed Orcutt (born 1963), American politician
- Geil Orcutt (1916–2001), American politician
- Guy Orcutt (1917–2006), American econometrician
- Hortense May Orcutt (1874–1936), American educator
- John Orcutt, American geophysicist
- Maureen Orcutt (1907–2007), American amateur golfer and reporter
- Samuel Orcutt, American historian and genealogist
- William Dana Orcutt (1870-1953), American book designer, typeface designer, historian, and author
- William Warren Orcutt (1869–1942), American petroleum geologist
