= 1992 United States House of Representatives elections in Connecticut =

- November 3, 1992

All 6 Connecticut seats to the United States House of Representatives
- Turnout: 83.9%
	Majority party	Minority party
Party	Republican	Democratic
Last election	3	3
Seats won	3	3
Seat change	Steady	Steady
Popular vote	699,155	644,424
Percentage	48.72%	44.90%
Swing	▼3.92%	▼2.28%

Republican
30–40%
40–50%
50–60%
60–70%
70–80%
80–90%
Democratic
40–50%
50–60%
60–70%
70–80%
80–90%

The 1992 United States House of Representatives elections in Connecticut were held on November 3, 1992, to elect the six members of the U.S. House, one from each of the state's congressional districts, to represent Connecticut in the 103rd Congress. These elections coincided with the Presidential election and a U.S. Senate election, as well as elections to the state legislature.

The elections took place after the decennial 1990 United States census. Connecticut maintained its number of congressional districts, and the redistricted map was adopted on November 27, 1991. The elections were also on the backdrop of the election of Connecticut Governor Lowell Weicker in 1990, marking the start of the A Connecticut Party. This was the first election in which the party ran candidates on the federal level.

All incumbents ran for and won re-election. As no district changed partisan control, that meant the 3-3 split between the Democrats and Republicans was maintained.

== Overview ==
United States House of Representatives elections in Connecticut, 1992
Party	Votes	Percentage	Seats	+/–
Republican	699,155	48.72%	3	0
Democratic (Note: Of the Democratic total, there were only 501,887 votes cast for the Democratic party, while the additional 142,537 were votes for the A Connecticut Party who co-nominated 3 of the Democratic candidates.)	644,424	44.90%	3	0
A Connecticut	65,701	4.58%	0	0
Concerned citizens	20,211	1.41%	0	0
Natural Law	2,309	0.16%	0	0
Independent	1,677	0.12%	0	0
Petitioning candidate	1,661	0.11%	0	0
Write-in candidates	25	0.00%	0	0
Totals	1,435,163	100.00%	6	—

Popular vote
Republican	48.72%
Democratic	44.90%
A Connecticut	4.58%

House seats
Republican	50%
Democratic	50%

== District 1 ==
1992 Connecticut's 1st congressional district election
- Turnout: 81.2%
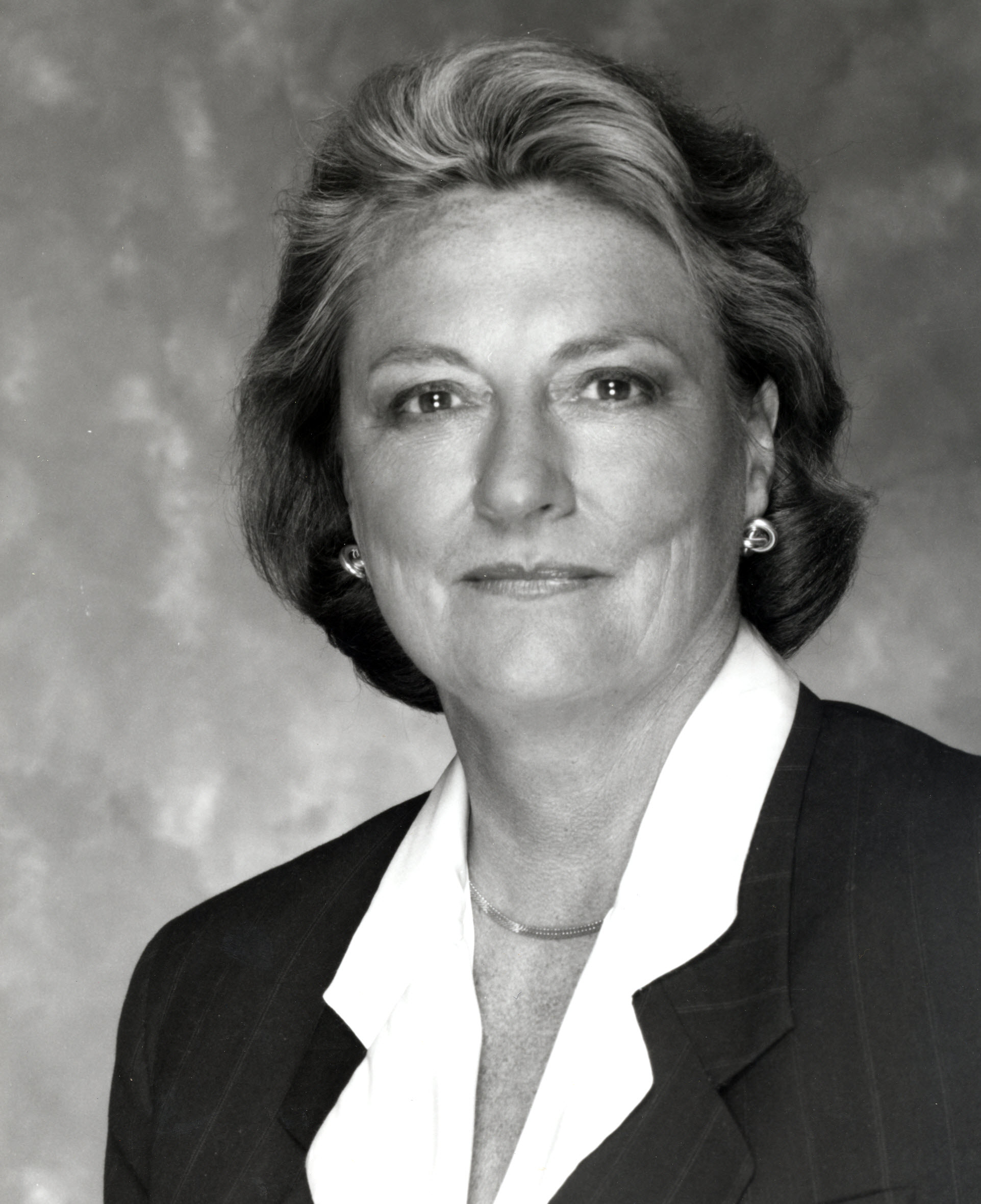

Nominee	Barbara Kennelly	Philip L. Steele
Party	Democratic	Republican
Alliance	A Connecticut
Popular vote	164,735	75,113
Percentage	67.12%	30.60%
- Municipality results Kennelly 50–60% 60–70% 70–80% 80–90%
U.S. Representative before election
Barbara B. Kennelly
Democratic
Elected U.S. Representative
Barbara B. Kennelly
Democratic

Incumbent Democrat Barbara B. Kennelly, who was originally elected in 1981, faced Republican opponent Philip L. Steele. She won re-election with 67.1% of the vote.

=== Republican primary ===
==== Candidates ====
===== Nominee =====
- Philip L. Steele, Hartford lawyer and brother of Robert H. Steele

===== Eliminated in primary =====
- Robert F. Ludgin, former Hartford deputy mayor (Democratic)

==== Convention ====
July 22, 1992 Republican convention
Candidate	Round 1	
Candidate	Votes	%
Robert F. Ludgin	49	50.5%
Philip L. Steele	48	49.5%
Inactive Ballots	0 ballots	

==== Primary results ====
September 15, 1992 Republican primary
Party	Candidate	Votes	%
Republican	Philip L. Steele	9,723	68.82%
Republican	Robert F. Ludgin	4,406	31.18%
Total votes		14,129	100.00%

=== General election ===
==== Results ====
Connecticut's First Congressional District election, 1992
Party	Candidate	Votes	%
Total	Barbara Kennelly (incumbent)	164,735	67.12%
Democratic	Barbara Kennelly	112,838	45.97%
A Connecticut Party	Barbara Kennelly	51,897	21.14%
Republican	Philip L. Steele	75,113	30.60%
Concerned Citizens	Gary R. Garneau	5,577	2.27%
Write-in	Tom Hall	5	0.00%
Total votes		245,430	100.00%
Democratic hold			

== District 2 ==
1992 Connecticut's 2nd congressional district election
- Turnout: 85.4%
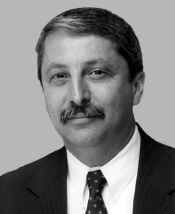

Nominee	Sam Gejdenson	Edward W. Munster
Party	Democratic	Republican
Alliance	A Connecticut
Popular vote	123,291	119,416
Percentage	50.80%	49.20%
- Municipality results Gejdenson 50–60% 60–70% 70–80% Munster 50–60%
U.S. Representative before election
Sam Gejdenson
Democratic
Elected U.S. Representative
Sam Gejdenson
Democratic

Incumbent Democrat Sam Gejdenson, originally elected in 1980, went up against Republican nominee Edward W. Munster, a State Senator from Haddam. Gejdenson narrowly won re-election to a seventh term with 50.8% of the vote, although Munster initially refused to concede.

=== Republican primary ===
==== Candidates ====
===== Nominee =====
- Edward W. Munster, state Senator from the 33rd district

===== Eliminated in primary =====
- Glenn T. Carberry, nominee for this seat in 1988

===== Eliminated at convention =====
- Merja Lehtinen, magazine editor

==== Convention ====
July 24, 1992 Republican convention
Candidate	Round 1	
Candidate	Votes	%
Glenn T. Carberry	84	52.50%
Edward W. Munster	70	43.75%
Merja Lehtinen	6	3.75%
Inactive Ballots	0 ballots	

==== Primary results ====
September 15, 1992 Republican primary
Party	Candidate	Votes	%
Republican	Edward W. Munster	8,928	53.66%
Republican	Glenn T. Carberry	7,709	46.34%
Total votes		16,637	100.00%

=== General election ===
==== Results ====
Connecticut's Second Congressional District election, 1992
Party	Candidate	Votes	%
Total	Sam Gejdenson (incumbent)	123,291	50.80%
Democratic	Sam Gejdenson	83,197	34.28%
A Connecticut Party	Sam Gejdenson	40,094	16.52%
Republican	Edward W. Munster	119,416	49.20%
Total votes		242,707	100.00%
Democratic hold			

== District 3 ==
1992 Connecticut's 3rd congressional district election
- Turnout: 80.8%
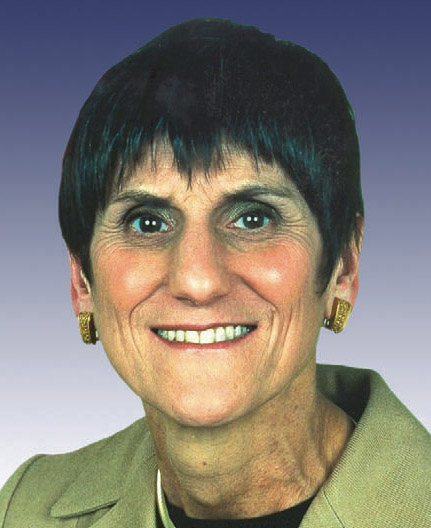

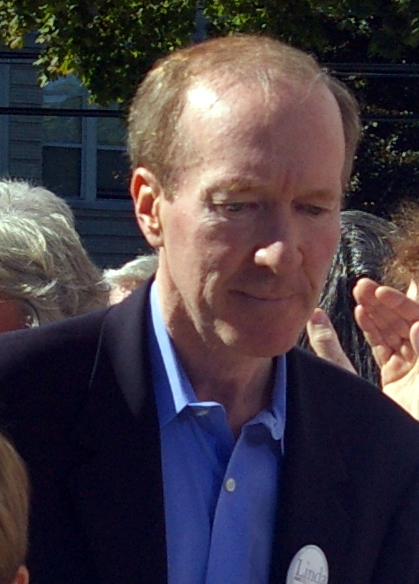
Nominee	Rosa DeLauro	Tom Scott
Party	Democratic	Republican
Alliance	A Connecticut
Popular vote	162,568	84,952
Percentage	65.68%	34.32%
- Municipality results DeLauro 50–60% 60–70% 80–90%
U.S. Representative before election
Rosa DeLauro
Democratic
Elected U.S. Representative
Rosa DeLauro
Democratic

Incumbent Democrat Rosa DeLauro faced Republican challenger and former State Senator Tom Scott. DeLauro won re-election to a second term with 65.68% of the vote. This was a significant overperformance compared her previous election result in 1990, in which she only narrowly won with 52% to 48% of the vote against Scott.

Results

Connecticut's Third Congressional District election, 1992
Party	Candidate	Votes	%
Total	Rosa DeLauro (incumbent)	162,568	65.68%
Democratic	Rosa DeLauro	112,022	45.26%
A Connecticut Party	Rosa DeLauro	50,546	20.42%
Republican	Tom Scott	84,952	34.32%
Write-in	William "Bill" Russell	9	0.00%
Write-in	Peter J. Krala	2	0.00%
Total votes		247,531	100.00%
Democratic hold			

== District 4 ==
1992 Connecticut's 4th congressional district election
- Turnout: 84.0%
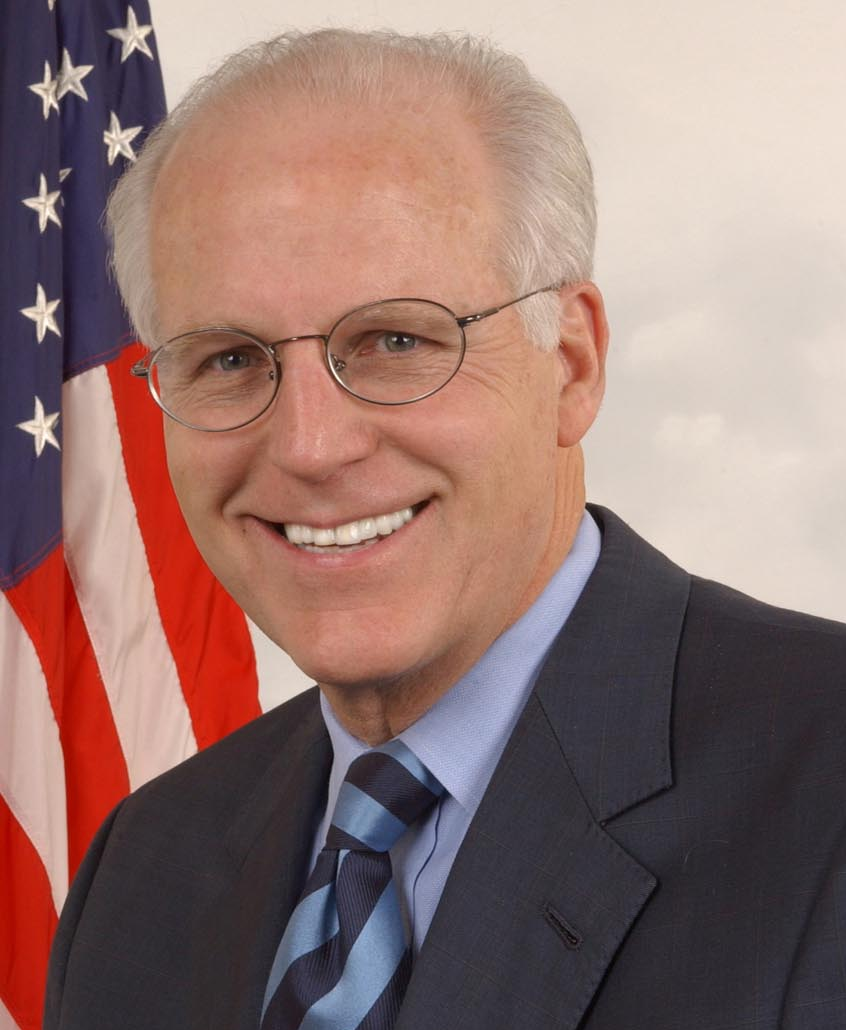

Nominee	Chris Shays	Dave Schropfer
Party	Republican	Democratic
Popular vote	147,816	58,666
Percentage	67.31%	26.71%
- Municipality results Shays 40–50% 60–70% 70-80% 80-90%
U.S. Representative before election
Chris Shays
Republican
Elected U.S. Representative
Chris Shays
Republican

Incumbent Republican Christopher Shays, originally elected in 1987, faced Stamford Board of Finance member Dave Schropfer (D) and Darien attorney Al Smith (ACP). He won re-election with 67.3% of the vote.

=== Democratic primary ===
==== Nominee ====
- Dave Schropfer, international marketing consultant from Stamford

==== Eliminated at convention ====
- Al Smith, candidate for this seat in 1990

==== Convention ====
July 20, 1992 Democratic convention
Candidate	Round 1	
Candidate	Votes	%
Dave Schropfer	167	82.27%
Al Smith	36	17.73%
Inactive Ballots	0 ballots	

=== General election ===
==== Results ====
Connecticut's Fourth Congressional District election, 1992
Party	Candidate	Votes	%
Republican	Chris Shays (incumbent)	147,816	67.31%
Democratic	Dave Schropfer	58,666	26.71%
A Connecticut Party	Al Smith	11,679	5.32%
Natural Law	Ronald M. Fried	1,445	0.66%
Write-In	Edward H. Tonkin	9	0.00%
Total votes		219,615	100.00%
Republican hold			

== District 5 ==
1992 Connecticut's 5th congressional district election
- Turnout: 85.8%
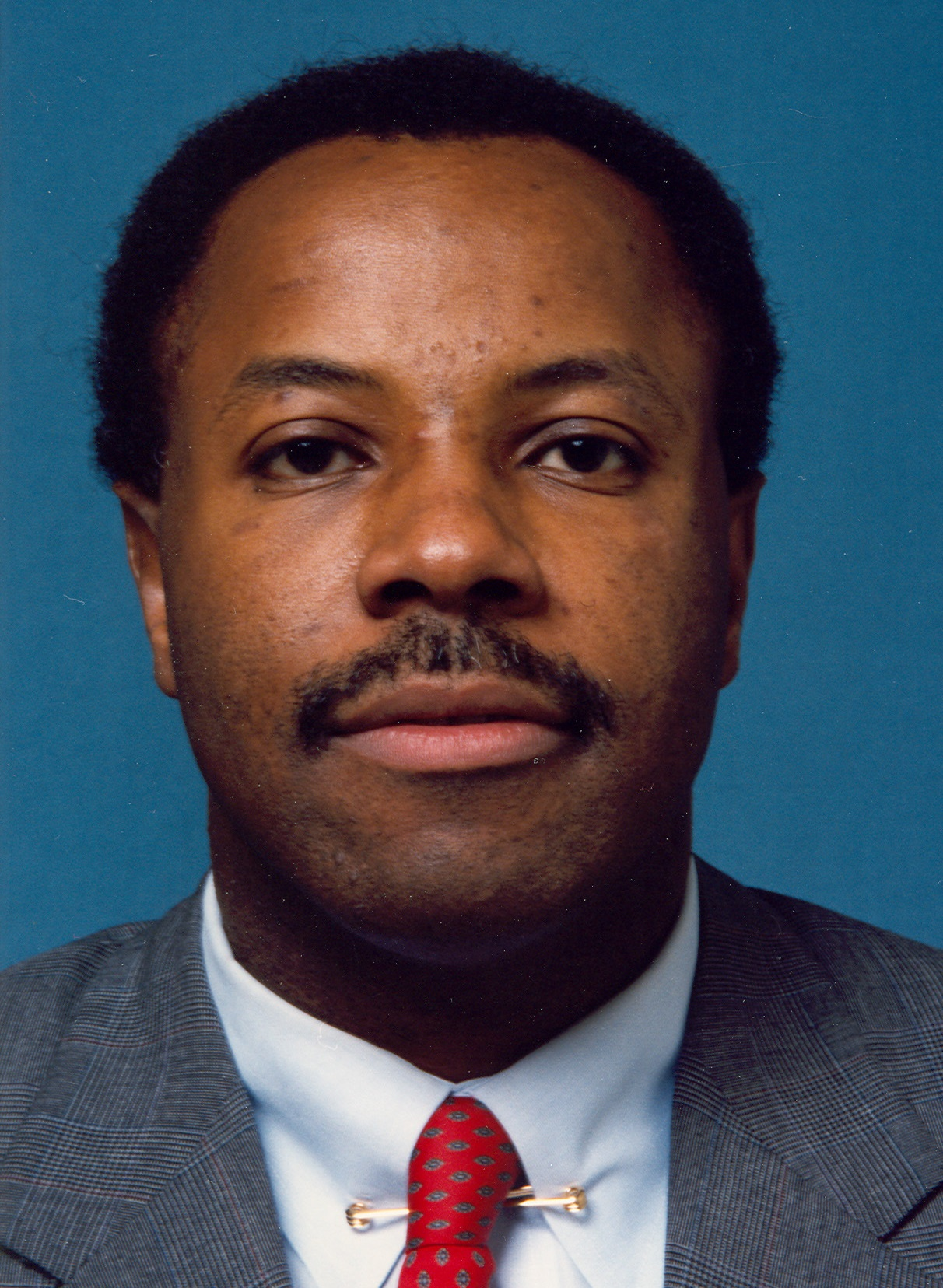

Nominee	Gary Franks	James Lawlor	Lynn Taborsak
Party	Republican	Democratic	A Connecticut
Popular vote	104,891	74,791	54,022
Percentage	43.65%	31.13%	22.48%
- Municipality results Franks 30–40% 40–50% 50–60% Lawlor 40–50%
U.S. Representative before election
Gary Franks
Republican
Elected U.S. Representative
Gary Franks
Republican

Incumbent Republican Gary Franks, the only Black Republican in congress at the time, defeated Waterbury Probate Judge James Lawlor (D) and Democratic state representative from Danbury Lynn Taborsak (ACP).

Taborsak was previously a Democratic candidate for this district, but was nominated by the A Connecticut Party on July 23, during the primary election campaign.

=== Democratic primary ===
==== Candidates ====
===== Nominee =====
- James J. Lawlor, Waterbury Probate Judge

===== Eliminated in primary =====
- Lynn Taborsak, state Representative for the 109th district from Danbury

===== Eliminated at convention =====
- Joseph Heyman, former member of the Ridgefield Planning and Zoning Commission and chairman of CityCenter Danbury from Ridgefield

===== Withdrew =====
- Mel Thompson, political consultant from Derby

==== Convention ====
July 20, 1992 Democratic convention
Candidate	Round 1	
Candidate	Votes	%
James J. Lawlor	118	59.3%
Lynn Taborsak	74	37.2%
Joseph Heyman	7	3.5%
Inactive Ballots	1 ballot	

==== Primary results ====
Results by municipality: Lawlor: 60–70%; 70–80%; Taborsak: 50–60%; 60–70%; 70–80%; 80–90%; >90%

September 15, 1992 Democratic primary
Party	Candidate	Votes	%
Democratic	James Lawlor	13,623	51.44%
Democratic	Lynn Taborsak	12,858	48.56%
Total votes		26,481	100.00%

=== General election ===
==== Results ====
Connecticut's Fifth Congressional District election, 1992
Party	Candidate	Votes	%
Republican	Gary Franks (incumbent)	104,891	43.65%
Democratic	James J. Lawlor	74,791	31.13%
A Connecticut Party	Lynn Taborsak	54,022	22.48%
Concerned Citizens	Rosita Rodriguez	5,090	2.12%
Natural Law	Bernard A. Levas	864	0.36%
Petitioning candidate	David G. LaPointe	625	0.26%
Total votes		240,283	100.00%
Republican hold			

== District 6 ==
1992 Connecticut's 6th congressional district election
- Turnout: 86.5%
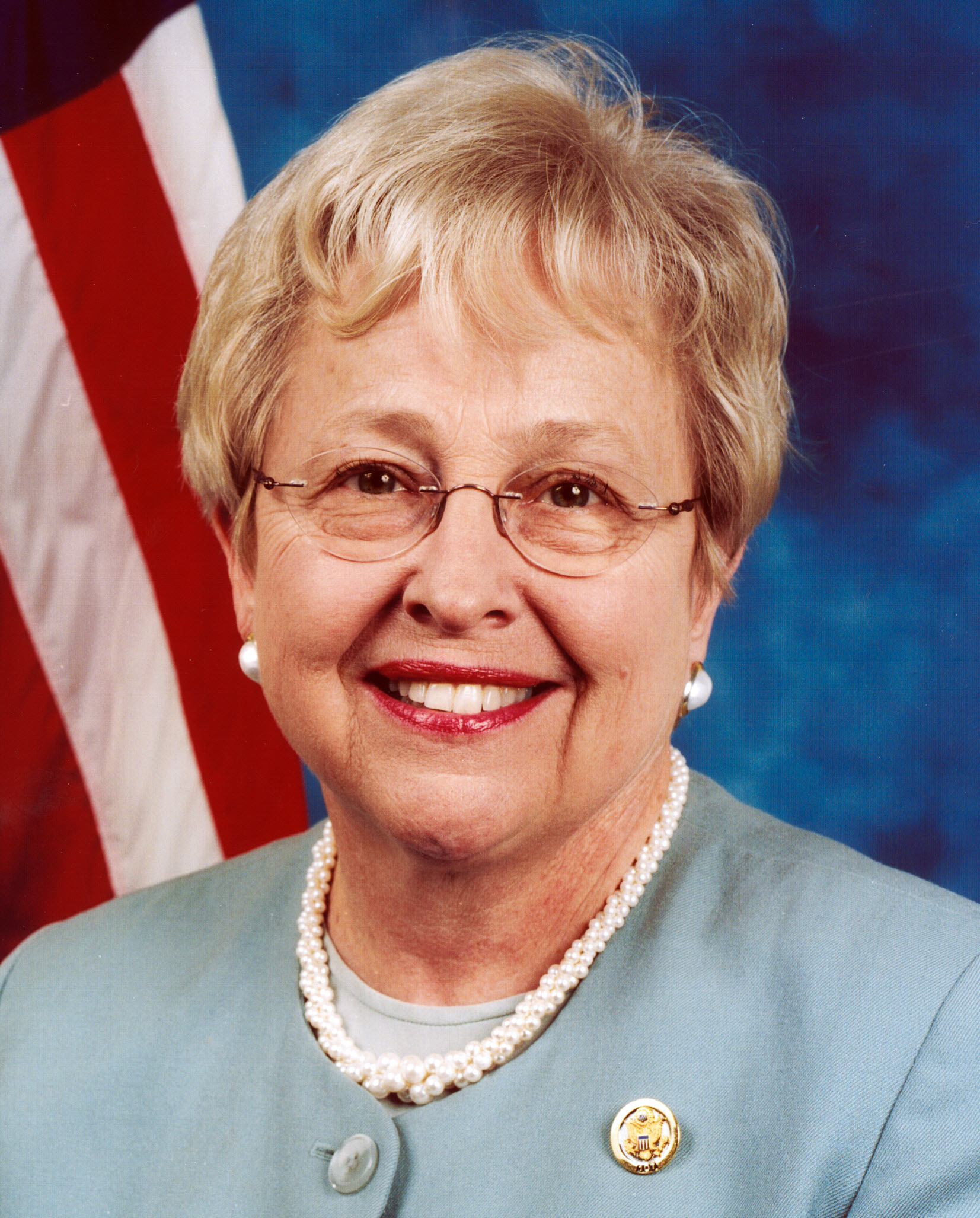

Nominee	Nancy Johnson	Eugene F. Slason
Party	Republican	Democratic
Popular vote	166,967	60,373
Percentage	69.69%	25.20%
- Municipality results Johnson 50–60% 60–70% 70-80% 80-90%
U.S. Representative before election
Nancy Johnson
Republican
Elected U.S. Representative
Nancy Johnson
Republican

Incumbent Republican Nancy Johnson faced Democratic challenger Eugene F. Slason. She won re-election with 69.7% of the vote.

Results

Connecticut's Fifth Congressional District election, 1992
Party	Candidate	Votes	%
Republican	Nancy Johnson (incumbent)	166,967	69.69%
Democratic	Eugene F. Slason	60,373	25.20%
Concerned Citizens	Daniel W. Plawecki	9,544	3.98%
Independent	Charles Pearl	1,677	0.70%
Petitioning candidate	Ralph C. Economu	1,036	0.43%
Total votes		239,597	100.00%
Republican hold			
