= Geil Orcutt =

American politician (1916–2001)

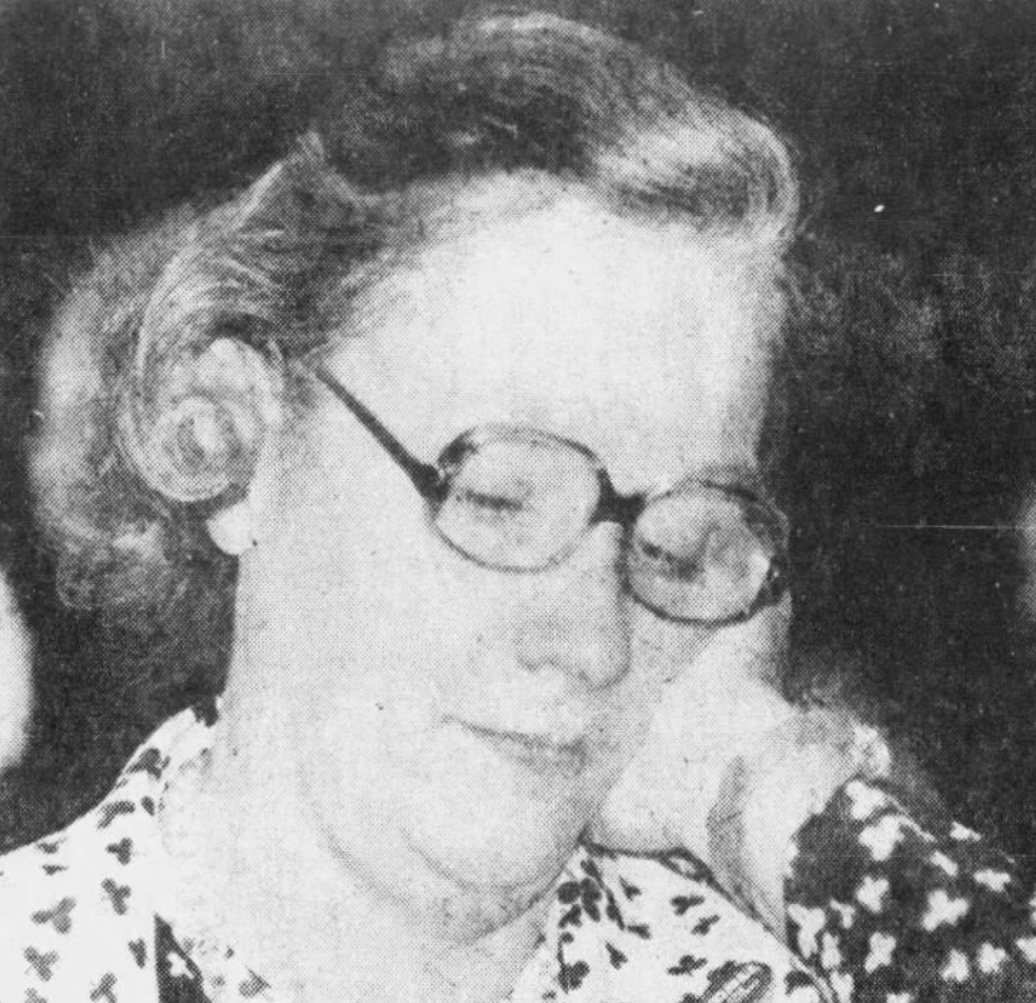
- Orcutt in 1976

Member of the Connecticut House of Representatives from the 98th district
- In office 1975–1983
- Preceded by: Mary Griswold
- Succeeded by: Francis X. O'Neill Jr.

Personal details
- Born: Geil Harriet Duffendack; November 3, 1916 Chicago, Illinois, U.S.
- Died: December 25, 2001 (aged 85)
- Party: Democratic
- Spouse: Guy Orcutt (m. 1941)
- Children: 4, including Alice Nakamura and Harriet Orcutt Duleep
- Relatives: Emi Nakamura (granddaughter)
- Education: University of Michigan; Chicago Theological Seminary

Geil Harriet Orcutt (November 3, 1916 – December 25, 2001) was an American politician who served in the Connecticut House of Representatives from 1975 to 1983, representing the 98th district as a Democrat.

== Personal life ==
Geil Harriet Duffendack was born on November 3, 1916, in Chicago, Illinois, to Ora and Cora Duffendack. She graduated from the University of Michigan, and from the Chicago Theological Seminary, where she earned a master's degree in religious education. She married Guy Orcutt on June 24, 1941. Guy became an econometrician and professor, and they later moved to New Haven, Connecticut, when he took a teaching position at Yale University. They had four children: Guy, James, and economists Alice Nakamura and Harriet Orcutt Duleep. Economist Emi Nakamura is their granddaughter.

== Political career ==
Orcutt was first elected to the Connecticut House of Representatives in 1974, and she served four terms representing the 98th district as a Democrat. She did not run for reelection in 1982.

== Death ==
Orcutt died on December 25, 2001, at age 85.
