= Frary =

Frary is a surname. Notable people with the surname include:

- Donald Paige Frary (1893–1919), American professor and author
- Frank P. Frary (1856–1911), American politician
- Michael Frary (1918–2005), American artist
- Ralph Frary (1876–1925), American baseball player and umpire
