= 2026 Connecticut State Comptroller election =

- November 3, 2026
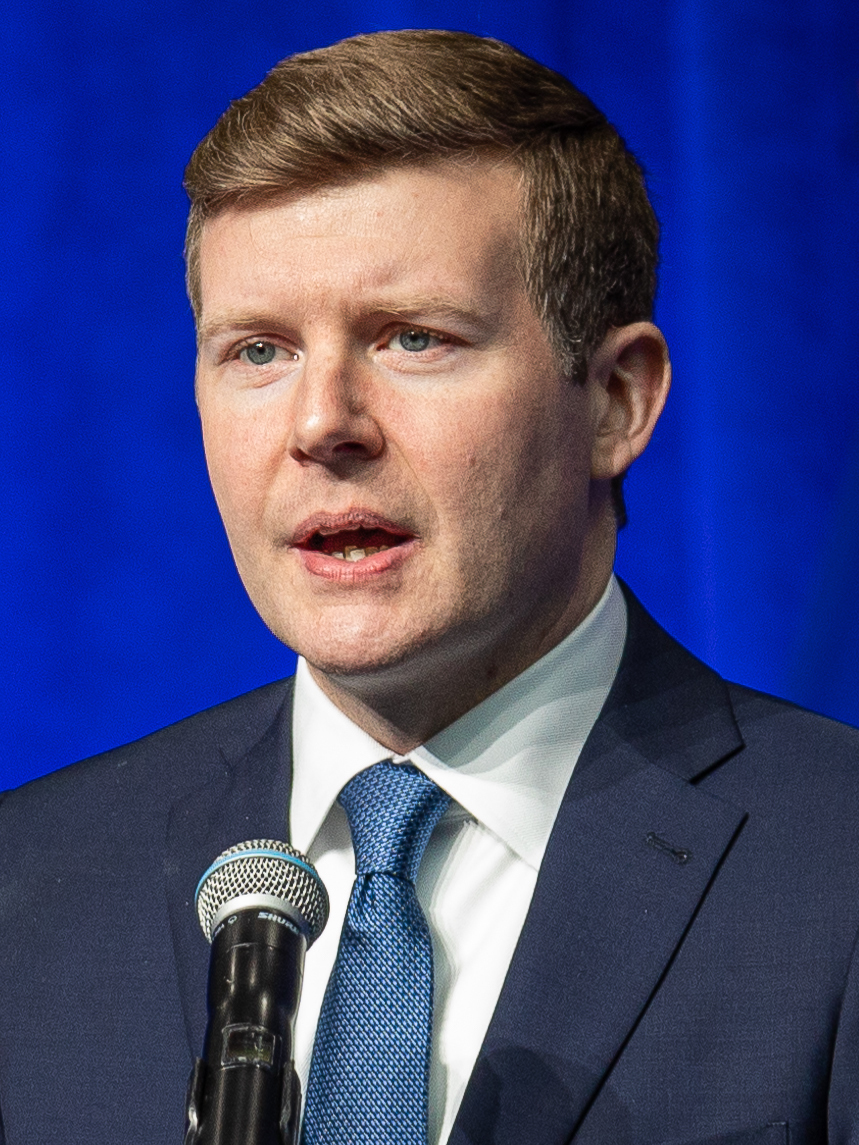

Nominee	Sean Scanlon	Jen Tooker
Party	Democratic	Republican
Alliance	Parties: Working Families; Independent
Popular vote	802,185	470,706
Percentage	63.02%	36.98%
- Scanlon: 50–60% 60–70% 70–80% 80–90% >90% Tooker: 50–60% 60–70%
State Comptroller before election
Sean Scanlon
Democratic
Elected State Comptroller
Sean Scanlon
Democratic

The 2026 Connecticut State Comptroller election was held on November 3, 2026, to elect the State Comptroller of Connecticut. Primary elections were held on August 11, 2026.

Incumbent Democrat Sean Scanlon, who was elected in 2022 with 55.1% of the vote, ran for re-election to a second term in office.

== Democratic primary ==
=== Candidates ===
==== Nominee ====
- Sean Scanlon, incumbent state comptroller

== Republican primary ==
=== Candidates ===
==== Nominee ====
- Jen Tooker, former Westport first selectwoman

== General election ==
=== Results ===
2026 Connecticut State Comptroller election
Party	Candidate	Votes	%	±%
Democratic	Sean Scanlon	744,378	58.48	+6.28
Working Families	Sean Scanlon	33,769	2.65	+1.15
Independent Party	Sean Scanlon	24,038	1.89	+0.45
Total	Sean Scanlon (incumbent)	802,185	63.02	+7.88
Republican	Jennifer S. Tooker	470,706	36.98	−7.88
Total votes		1,272,891	100.00	
