= Alice Nakamura =

American-Canadian economist and writer

Alice O. Nakamura
- Born: Alice Orcutt; 1945 (age 80–81); Boston, Massachusetts, U.S.
- Education: University of Wisconsin–Madison (BA); Johns Hopkins University (PhD)
- Spouse: Masao Nakamura
- Children: 2, including Emi Nakamura
- Parent(s): Guy Orcutt; Geil Orcutt
- Scientific career
- Fields: Economics
- Workplaces: University of Alberta
- Website: http://www.alicenakamura.com/

Alice Orcutt Nakamura (born 1945) is an American-Canadian economist and writer. She is a fellow of the Canadian Economics Association, which is the highest honour of the association. She is currently a professor of finance and management science at the University of Alberta where she has taught since 1972. Nakamura was the first female president of the Canadian Economics Association in 1994–1995. She was also the president of the International Association for Research on Income and Wealth from 2014 to 2016.

Nakamura is the daughter of economist Guy Orcutt and politician Geil Orcutt, and the sister of economist Harriet Orcutt Duleep. She is married to Masao Nakamura (current professor at the University of British Columbia) and is the mother of Emi Nakamura (current professor at the University of California, Berkeley).

== Education and work ==
Alice Nakamura obtained her Bachelor of Science in Economics with a minor in Political Science from the University of Wisconsin-Madison in 1973. She pursued her Ph.D. in Economics with a doctoral minor in Sociology from Johns Hopkins University in 1973.

Today, she is best known for her focus on labour economics, quality management, official statistics, and genomic statistics. She also focuses much of her research on productivity and price measurement, employment, employment earnings and compensation policies as well as social policies and taxation, economic methodology and microanalytic simulation. Some of her most recent works include "Sourcing Substitution and Related Price Index Biases" wherein she alongside Erwin Diewert, John Greenlees, Leonard Nakamura and Marshall Reinsdorf explains how price indexes have become increasingly biased in business settings, "The impact of upstream firms' waste output on downstream firms' performance in Japan" wherein she (alongside Hitoshi Hayami and Masao Nakamura) uses input-output analysis to determine levels of waste materials of the Japanese manufacturing industries, and "Building the Innovation Union: Lessons from the 2008 Financial Crisis" wherein Nakamura (with Leonard Nakamura and Masao Nakamura) uses examples from the Great Depression and the 2008 Financial Crisis to argue that it is necessary to extend the EU efforts of innovation for tangible goods to innovation for processes and regulatory processes.

== Scholarship ==
Alice Nakamura has written and edited 14 books and journal issues and is the author of 82 refereed articles and book chapters. She was also the first woman to publish in the American Economic Review (the second undergraduate student, after Robert Heibroner's first publication over 25 years prior). Alice Nakamura writes many of her works in cooperation with her husband, Masao Nakamura.

=== "Difficulties Assessing Multifactor Productivity for Canada" (2012) ===
In 2012, Alice Nakamura collaborated with some colleagues from the University of Alberta to assess data produced by Statistics Canada.

Together with Michael Harper and Lu Zhang, Alice Nakamura investigates why Canada's Mutlifactor Productivity Index (MPF) which is estimated by Statistics Canada was lower in 2011 than in 1977 (94.8 and 97.6 respectively) although many policies were introduced to improve Canada's productivity. Together with other economists, Nakamura argues that the MPF estimated by Statistics Canada is reflective of the nations' actual productivity. They contend that Statistics Canada use fragile sources to calculate the MPF where small over or understatements lead to irregularities in the measurement.

By bringing attention to the transparency of the Bureau of Labour Statistics of the United States, Nakamura and colleagues indicate that the Canadian productivity debate would benefit from similar levels of transparency. They also present large differences between the MFP found for Canada and the United States while hypothesising that given their similar economies and histories their MFPs should be much more similar.

They conclude that this is very likely due to errors and misestimates in the procedures used to calculate the MFP and that much more research is needed to settle this debate.

=== "Price Dynamics, Retail Chains and Inflation Measurement" (2011) ===
Together with her daughter Emi Nakamura, and Leonard Nakamura, Alice Nakamura examined price dynamics in retail chains and inflation measurement in the United States. They examined weekly price changes in hundreds of grocery stores. This work is particularly unique because it includes such a large data set, reaching tens of millions observations every year from 2001 to 2005.

They focus on the chain drift problem, which is the bias caused by price bouncing (from temporary sales) which over time leads to an overall drift in price of the product.

In this paper, they compare the prices of Coffee, Cold Cereal and Soft Drinks across and within chains. They include prices of these products during retail sales as well as the frequency of these sales. Using this data, they then calculate price indices and come to the finding that these affect measures of inflation as well as future forecasts. These price indices are affected by temporary sales. Nakamura et al. conclude that the characteristics of the retailer are key in pricing dynamics and thereby emphasise on the importance of using such a large sample size.

They find that price dynamics are more similar within chains and therefore the chain drift problem will appear to be alleviated the chain drift bias. However, Nakamura et al. suggest that in order to solve the chain drift problem, drift-free indexes such as those used in Germany, Italy or Spain should be used.

=== "Wal-Mart Innovation and Productivity: A Viewpoint" (2011) ===
Alice Nakamura collaborated with Richard Freeman, Leonard Nakamura, Marc Prud'homme and Amanda Pyman to analyse Wal-Mart, the biggest private sector employer in Canada and one of the most important retailers in the United States.

In the United States, one fourth of all productivity comes from the retail sector, and a sixth of this is attributable to Wal-Mart. It is also an important player in imports from China, Russia, Australia and Canada and continues to grow its productivity.

They use the MGI (McKinsey Global Institute) report which indicates that within the merchandise sector, Wal-Mart contributed to around a third of the productivity improvement between 1987 and 1995 and that Wal-Mart stands out because of its high productivity which puts it far ahead of its competitors. However they also criticise the MGI's ability to accurately measure productivity because the only product for which measurements were taken from was pharmaceuticals wholesaling.

Wal-Mart is the leader in a number of domains, including data warehousing, data enabled supply chain coordination, product codes and bar code labels, RFID (Radio Frequency Identification) use, and E-recruiting. Nakamura and colleagues use these points to demonstrate Walmart's high productivity.

They draw on research from Basker, who found that Wal-Mart prices decline as the association grows, and that there has been a long-run increase in retail jobs, but a decline in wholesale jobs. This is because Wal-Mart typically manages its own warehousing and the workers working in this sector are likely counted as retail workers. Other workers may also lose their jobs at competitive companies as Wal-Mart continues to expand, which is another reason for the decline in wholesale employees.

Nakamura and colleagues then focus on Wal-Mart in Canada: In Canada, retailers tend to be smaller, and therefore more vulnerable to the rising productivity of Wal-Mart. By analysing Wal-Mart's productivity, they find some support that the introduction and spreading of Wal-Mart in Canada increased employment and labour productivity in the country. They also note however that there may not be enough data to make accurate conclusions such as those of the United States.

Wal-Mart also benefits from receiving discounted shipping rates, and possibly special prices from producers, which decreases its unit input costs to below those of its competitors.

Lastly, Nakamura and colleagues raise some of the measurement issues made by the MGI, which could have effect on the accuracy of their analysis. Nevertheless, they note that Wal-Mart has made major jumps toward higher productivity, and are now benefiting from this by carrying a large percentage of the retail market share in both, the US and Canada.

=== "Aging Female and Foreign Workers, and Japanese Labour Markets: an International Perspective" (2011) ===
Alice Nakamura writes this chapter alongside her husband Masao Nakamura and Atsushi Seike in the book entitled 'Changing Japanese Business, Economy and Society'.

In this chapter, Nakamura and colleagues give an overview of the Japanese economy and point out areas for improvement in an international context.

After World War 2 there were a number of economic protests throughout Japan, but the economy fully recovered by 1960, and flourished until 1990. Since 1990, Japan has been in a long recession, characterised by its inability to redirect capital towards increasing productivity and high unemployment rates. Therefore, it has been difficult for Japan to compete with US and European firms, who through trade agreements such as NAFTA and the EU have gained the comparative advantage in the production of many goods.

Nakamura sheds light on Japan's ageing population which in theory should reduce unemployment rates but in reality increases taxes paid by, and number of people outside the workforce supported by workers.

The Japanese work culture is characterised by lifetime employment, which leads to high investment in human capital, multi-task skills within the firm and minimum concern about job loss. Seniority based wages are also a defining factor of Japanese work culture, and have the advantage that workers keep long-run consequences of their work in mind. However, Nakamura emphasises that these cultural aspects often do not apply to women or older workers. This is because firms generally do not consider hiring those in the middle of their careers, and women therefore often do not return to the workforce after bearing children because they are unable to find a job. Where the United States have taken steps to decrease discrimination towards female workers, Nakamura believes that Japan has not paid sufficient attention to this issue.

Japan specialises in precision work and high standards of quality control, but faces high costs in maintenance and recently there have been increases in disparities between these domains and what is deemed competitive at the economic market. Japan has lost its comparative advantage in manufacturing, and therefore has increased its need to re-assess and change these systems.

== Awards ==
- 1996: Honorary Doctor of Law, awarded by the University of Western Ontario
- 1994: Francis Winspear Professor of Business, University of Alberta
- 1992: J. Gordin Kaplan Award for Excellence in Research
- 1984-1985: McCalla Research Professorship, University of Alberta

== Group membership ==
- Member of the Axworthy Social Security Reform Task Force
- Statistics Canada Price Measurement Advisory Committee
- Co-chair of the Canadian Employment Research Forum (CERF)

== Selected works ==
- ———; Nakamura, Masao (1981). "On the Relationships Among Several Specification Error Tests Presented by Durbin, Wu and Hausman". Econometrica. 49 (6): 1583–1588. doi:10.2307/1911420. JSTOR 1911420.
- ———; Nakamura, Masao (1992). "The Econometrics of Female Labor Supply and Children". Econometric Reviews. 11 (1): 1–71. doi:10.1080/07474939208800217.
- Nakamura, Masao; ——— (1981). "A Comparison of the Labor Force Behavior of Married Women in the United States and Canada, with Special Attention to the Impact of Income Taxes". Econometrica. 49 (2): 451–489. doi:10.2307/1913321. JSTOR 1913321. PMID 12313554.
- ———; Nakamura, Masao (1983). "Part-time and Full-time Work Behavior of Married Women: A Model with a Doubly Truncated Dependent Variable". Canadian Journal of Economics. 16 (2): 229–257. doi:10.2307/134998. JSTOR 134998.
- ———; Nakamura, Masao; Cullen, Dallas (1979). "Job Opportunities, the Offered Wage and the Labor Supply of Married Women". American Economic Review. 69 (5): 787–805. JSTOR 1813647.
- Diewert, W. Erwin; ——— (2003). "Index Number Concepts, Measures and Decompositions of Productivity Growth". Journal of Productivity Analysis. 19 (2–3): 127–160. doi:10.1023/A:1022897231521. S2CID 154810096.
