= 2022 Connecticut State Comptroller election =

- November 8, 2022
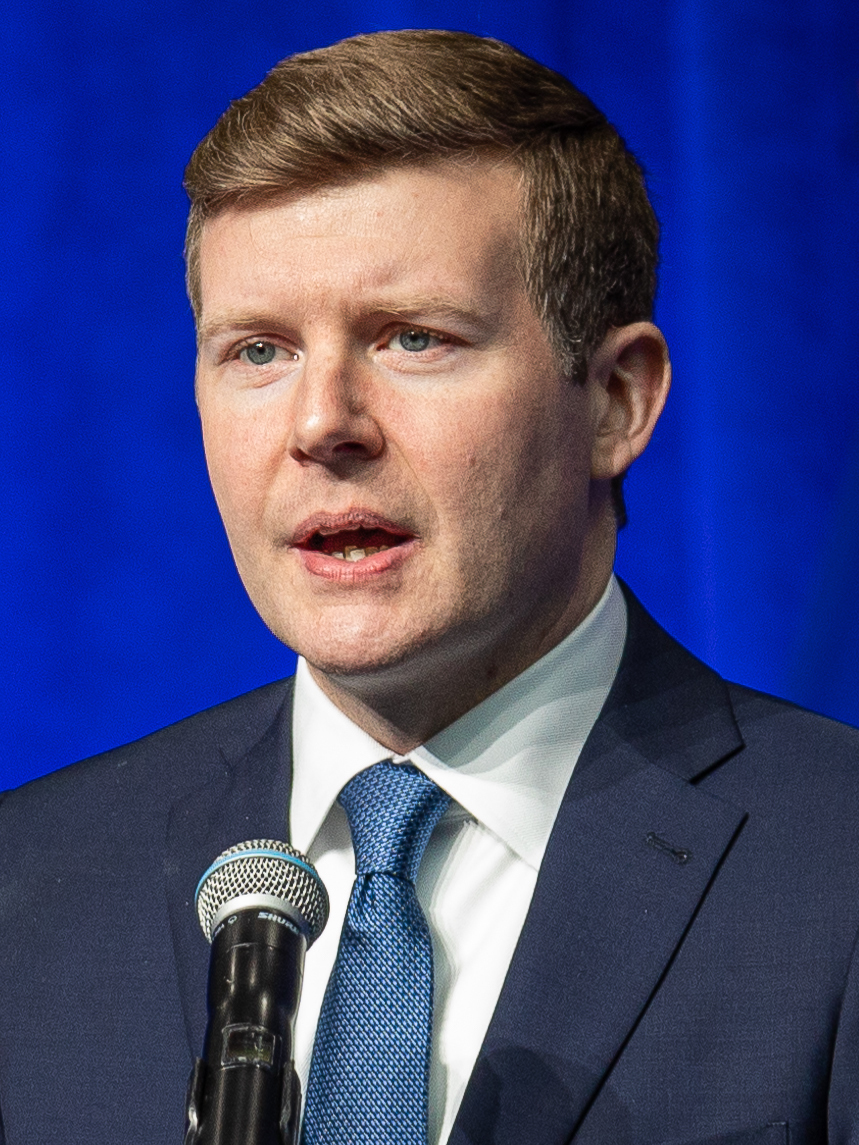

Nominee	Sean Scanlon	Mary Fay
Party	Democratic	Republican
Alliance	Working Families; Independent
Popular vote	681,856	554,678
Percentage	55.1%	44.9%
- Scanlon: 50–60% 60–70% 70–80% 80–90% Fay: 50–60% 60–70%
Comptroller before election
Natalie Braswell
Democratic
Elected Comptroller
Sean Scanlon
Democratic

The 2022 Connecticut State Comptroller election took place on November 8, 2022, to elect the next Connecticut State Comptroller. Incumbent Democrat Natalie Braswell was appointed to the position by Governor Ned Lamont after the resignation of Kevin Lembo. She did not seek a full term.

== Democratic primary ==
=== Candidates ===
==== Declared ====
- Sean Scanlon, state representative (2015–present)

==== Declined ====
- Natalie Braswell, incumbent comptroller

=== Endorsements ===
Sean Scanlon

Organizations

- Connecticut Working Families Party
- Democratic Party of Connecticut

Labor unions

- Connecticut AFL–CIO

== Republican primary ==
=== Candidates ===
==== Declared ====
- Mary Fay, member of the West Hartford town council

=== Endorsements ===
Mary Fay

Organizations

- Connecticut Republican Party

== General election ==
=== Results ===
2022 Connecticut State Comptroller election
Party	Candidate	Votes	%	±%
Democratic	Sean Scanlon	645,450	52.20%	−0.76%
Working Families	Sean Scanlon	18,513	1.50%	−0.62%
Independent Party	Sean Scanlon	17,893	1.44%	−0.21%
Total	Sean Scanlon	681,856	55.14%	+0.06%
Republican	Mary Fay	554,678	44.86%	+1.68%
Total votes		1,236,534	100.0%	
Democratic hold				

==== By county ====
County	Sean Scanlon Democratic		Mary Fay Republican		Total votes cast
County	#	%	#	%	Total votes cast
Fairfield	173,616	56.15%	135,565	43.85%	309,181
Hartford	177,890	58.88%	124,221	41.12%	302,111
Litchfield	35,496	44.49%	44,295	55.51%	79,791
Middlesex	39,845	54.5%	33,268	45.5%	73,113
New Haven	153,790	55.35%	124,068	44.65%	277,858
New London	53,065	54.43%	44,428	45.57%	97,493
Tolland	30,431	51.9%	28,202	48.1%	58,633
Windham	17,723	46.21%	20,631	53.79%	38,354
Totals	681,856	55.14%	554,678	44.86%	1,236,534

==== By congressional district ====
Scanlon won four of five congressional districts with Fay winning the remaining one, which elected a Democrat.

District	Scanlon	Fay	Representative
1st	60%	40%	John B. Larson
2nd	53%	47%	Joe Courtney
3rd	57%	43%	Rosa DeLauro
4th	57%	43%	Jim Himes
5th	49.5%	50.5%	Jahana Hayes
