= James E. Dyer =

American politician (1946–2011)

Mayor of Danbury, Connecticut
- In office 1979–1987
- Preceded by: Donald Boughton
- Succeeded by: Joseph H. Sauer Jr.

Member of the Connecticut House of Representatives from the 110th district
- In office 1977–1979
- Preceded by: Donald F. Esposito
- Succeeded by: Paul J. Garavel

Personal details
- Born: James Edmund Dyer; September 20, 1946 Danbury, Connecticut, U.S.
- Died: July 28, 2011 (aged 64)
- Party: Democratic
- Education: Western Connecticut State University

James Edmund Dyer (September 20, 1946 – July 28, 2011) was an American politician from Connecticut.

Born in Danbury, Connecticut, Dyer graduated from Western Connecticut State University. A Democrat, Dyer served in the Connecticut House of Representatives and as mayor of Danbury from 1979 to 1987. Dyer defeated incumbent Mayor Donald Boughton in 1979. Dyer lost reelection in 1987.
