= Bob Godfrey (politician) =

American politician

Speaker pro tempore of the Connecticut House of Representatives
- Incumbent
- Assumed office January 3, 2017
- Preceded by: Position established

Member of the Connecticut House of Representatives from the 110th district
- Incumbent
- Assumed office January 4, 1989
- Preceded by: Paul J. Garavel

Personal details
- Born: September 11, 1948 (age 77) Danbury, Connecticut, U.S.
- Party: Democratic
- Education: Fordham University (BA); University of Connecticut, Hartford (JD)

Bob Godfrey (born September 11, 1948) is the Deputy Speaker of the state of Connecticut's General Assembly. A leader of the Council of State Governments, he served as its Eastern Regional Conference Chairman in 2005, National Vice Chair in 2009, as National Chairman-Elect in 2010, and its National Chairman in 2011.

A Democrat, Godfrey has represented the 110th District (Danbury) in the General Assembly for 12 terms. In addition to serving as Deputy Speaker, he is a member of the Judiciary Committee, the Government, Administration and Elections Committee, as well as the Legislative Management Committee.

An attorney, he is a graduate of Fordham University in New York and obtained his Juris Doctor at the University of Connecticut School of Law. He previously served on the Danbury Common Council and the United States Naval Reserve. Active with the Greater Danbury Chamber of Commerce, he managed a family-owned pet shop.

Connecticut House of Representatives
Preceded by Paul J. Garavel	Member of the Connecticut House of Representatives from the 110th district 1989–present	Incumbent
Political offices
New office	Speaker pro tempore of the Connecticut House of Representatives; 2017–present	Incumbent
