= Charles Seymour =

American academic administrator (1885–1963)

- Seymour, c. 1930

15th President of Yale University
- In office 1937–1951
- Preceded by: James Rowland Angell
- Succeeded by: Alfred Whitney Griswold

Personal details
- Born: January 1, 1885 New Haven, Connecticut, U.S.
- Died: August 11, 1963 (aged 78) Chatham, Massachusetts, U.S.
- Education: King's College, Cambridge (BA); Yale University (BA, PhD)

Charles Seymour (January 1, 1885 – August 11, 1963) was an American academic, historian and the 15th President of Yale University from 1937 to 1951. As an academic administrator, he was instrumental in establishing Yale's residential college system. His writing focused on the diplomatic history of World War I.

== Early life and education ==
Seymour was born in New Haven, Connecticut, the son of Thomas Day Seymour, who taught classics at Yale, and Sarah Hitchcock Seymour. His paternal grandfather, Nathan Perkins Seymour, was the great-great grandson of Thomas Clap, who was President of Yale in the 1740s. His paternal grandmother, Elizabeth Day, was the grandniece of Jeremiah Day, who was Yale's president from 1817 through 1846. An ancestor of his mother, the former Sarah Hitchcock, was awarded an honorary degree at Yale's first graduation ceremonies in 1702.

Seymour was awarded a Bachelor of Arts at King's College, Cambridge in 1904; and he earned a second BA from Yale in 1908. He went on to earn a PhD from Yale in 1911. In 1908, he was also tapped as a member of the Skull and Bones Society and in 1919 he was founding member of the Council on Foreign Relations.

== Career ==
Seymour's teaching experience began at Yale in 1911 when he was made an instructor in history. He was made a full professor in 1918; and when he eventually left teaching, he had risen amongst the faculty to become Sterling Professor of History (1922–1927). He taught history at Yale from 1911 though 1937, when he became president of the university.

Seymour served as the chief of the Austro-Hungarian Division of the American Commission to Negotiate Peace in 1919. He was also the U.S. delegate on the Romanian, Yugoslav and Czechoslovak territorial commissions in 1919.

In 1933, he delivered the Albert Shaw Lectures on Diplomatic History at Johns Hopkins University on the subject of American Diplomacy during the First World War.

Seymour served for ten years as the university's provost (1927–1937). During this period, Yale College was re-organized into a system of ten residential colleges, instituted in 1933 with the help of a grant by Yale graduate Edward S. Harkness, who admired the college systems at Oxford and Cambridge. Seymour became the first Master of Berkeley College.

Seymour was elected to the American Academy of Arts and Sciences in 1938 and the American Philosophical Society in 1939.

At age 52, Seymour succeeded James Rowland Angell as the university's 15th president in October 1937. After his retirement in July 1950, he would be succeeded by Alfred Whitney Griswold.

After his retirement as president, Seymour continued his involvement with the university as curator of the papers of Edward M. House at the Yale University Library.

He died in Chatham, Massachusetts in 1963 after a long illness. His son, Charles Seymour Jr., was a professor of art history at Yale.

== Selected works ==
- 1915 – Electoral Reform in England and Wales: The Development and Operation of the Parliamentary Franchise, 1832–1885. New Haven: Yale University Press.
- 1916 – The Diplomatic Background of the War, 1870–1914. New Haven: Yale University Press.
- 1918 – How the World Votes: The Story of Democratic Development in Elections with Donald Paige Frary. Springfield, Massachusetts: C. A. Nichols. OCLC 557198
- 1921 – Woodrow Wilson and the World War. New Haven: Yale University Press.
- 1926 – The Intimate Papers of Colonel House. New York: Houghton Mifflin. OCLC 476286
- 1934 – American Diplomacy During the World War. Baltimore: Johns Hopkins Press. [reprinted by Greenwood Press, Westport Connecticut, 1975: ISBN 978-0-8371-7746-5
- 1935 – American Neutrality, 1914–17: Essays on the Causes of American Intervention in the World War. OCLC 257742593
- 1921 – What Really Happened in Paris: the story of the Peace Conference, 1918–1919 with Edward House. New York: Charles Scribner's Sons.
- 1963 – Letters from the Paris Peace Conference. New Haven

Academic offices
Preceded by James Rowland Angell	President of Yale University; 1937–1951	Succeeded by Alfred Whitney Griswold
