= Connecticut's 110th House of Representatives district =

American legislative district

Connecticut's 110th State House of Representatives district
Representative
Bob Godfrey; D

Connecticut's 110th House of Representatives district elects one member of the Connecticut House of Representatives. It encompasses parts of Danbury and has been represented by Democrat Bob Godfrey since 1989.

== List of representatives ==
List of representatives from Connecticut's 110th State House district
Representative	Party	Years	District home	Note
Edward S. Gudelski	Democratic	1967–1973	New Haven	Seat created
Donald F. Esposito	Democratic	1973–1977	Danbury	
James E. Dyer	Democratic	1977–1981	Danbury	
Paul J. Garavel	Democratic	1981–1989	Danbury	
Bob Godfrey	Democratic	1989–	Danbury	

== Recent elections ==
=== 2022 ===
2022 Connecticut State House of Representatives election, 110th District
Party	Candidate	Votes	%
Democratic	Bob Godfrey (incumbent)	2,090	62.15
Republican	Eric Gleissner	1,273	37.85
Total votes		3,363	100.0

=== 2020 ===
2020 Connecticut State House of Representatives election, District 110
Party	Candidate	Votes	%
Democratic	Bob Godfrey (incumbent)	4,013	65.57
Republican	Erin M. Domenech	1,808	29.54
Working Families	Bob Godfrey (incumbent)	194	3.17
Independent Party	Erin M. Domenech	105	1.72
Total votes		6,120	100.00
Democratic hold			

=== 2018 ===
2018 Connecticut House of Representatives election, District 110
Party	Candidate	Votes	%
Democratic	Bob Godfrey (Incumbent)	2,497	72.8
Republican	Erin Domenech	933	27.2
Total votes		3,430	100.00
Democratic hold			

=== 2016 ===
2016 Connecticut House of Representatives election, District 110
Party	Candidate	Votes	%
Democratic	Bob Godfrey (Incumbent)	3,514	62.38
Republican	Emanuela Palmares	2,119	37.62
Total votes		5,633	100.00
Democratic hold			

=== 2014 ===
2014 Connecticut House of Representatives election, District 110
Party	Candidate	Votes	%
Democratic	Bob Godfrey (Incumbent)	1,759	64.2
Republican	Frank Goncalves	834	30.4
Working Families	Bob Godfrey (Incumbent)	146	5.3
Total votes		2,739	100.00
Democratic hold			

=== 2012 ===
2012 Connecticut House of Representatives election, District 110
Party	Candidate	Votes	%
Democratic	Bob Godfrey (Incumbent)	3,429	73.4
Republican	Scott DeMuth	1,244	26.6
Total votes		4,673	100.00
Democratic hold			
