= Joseph Taborsak =

American politician

Member of the Connecticut House of Representatives from the 109th district
- In office January 3, 2007 – January 9, 2013
- Preceded by: Lewis Wallace
- Succeeded by: David Arconti

Personal details
- Born: January 23, 1975 (age 51) Danbury, Connecticut, U.S.
- Party: Democratic
- Parent: Lynn Taborsak

Joseph Taborsak (born January 23, 1975) is an American politician who served in the Connecticut House of Representatives from the 109th district from 2007 to 2013. He is the son of politician Lynn Taborsak.
