= Lucien DiMeo =

American politician

Member of the Connecticut House of Representatives from the 103rd district
- In office January 6, 1993 – January 8, 1997
- Preceded by: Peter M. Lerner
- Succeeded by: Craig Henrici

Member of the Connecticut House of Representatives from the 98th district
- In office January 6, 1971 – January 3, 1973
- Preceded by: Milton I. Caplan
- Succeeded by: Mary Griswold

Personal details
- Born: March 30, 1930 Hamden, Connecticut
- Died: April 23, 2022 (aged 92) Branford, Connecticut
- Party: Republican

Lucien DiMeo (March 30, 1930 – April 23, 2022) was an American politician who served in the Connecticut House of Representatives from the 98th district from 1971 to 1973 and from the 103rd district from 1993 to 1997.

He died on April 23, 2022, in Branford, Connecticut at age 92.
