= Patricia Widlitz =

American politician (born 1945)

Member of the Connecticut House of Representatives from the 98th district
- In office January 4, 1995 – January 7, 2015
- Preceded by: Janet Poss
- Succeeded by: Sean Scanlon

Personal details
- Born: July 30, 1945 (age 81) Middletown, Connecticut, U.S.
- Party: Democratic
- Education: Central Connecticut State University (BS)

Patricia Widlitz (born July 30, 1945) is an American politician who served in the Connecticut House of Representatives from the 98th district from 1995 to 2015. She is Jewish.
