= Moira Rader =

American politician

Member of the Connecticut House of Representatives from the 98th district
- Incumbent
- Assumed office 2023
- Preceded by: Sean Scanlon

Personal details
- Born: 1970 (age 55–56)
- Party: Democratic
- Education: Villanova University (BA); Columbia University (MS)
- Profession: Estate agent

Moira Rader (born 1970) is a Democratic member of the Connecticut House of Representatives serving in the 98th district since 2022.
