= A. Whitney Griswold =

American historian and educator (1906–1963)

16th President of Yale University
- In office 1950–1963
- Preceded by: Charles Seymour
- Succeeded by: Kingman Brewster Jr.

Personal details
- Born: October 27, 1906 Morristown, New Jersey, U.S.
- Died: April 19, 1963 (aged 56) New Haven, Connecticut, U.S.
- Spouse: Mary Griswold (m. 1930)
- Relations: Eli Whitney (ancestor)
- Education: Yale University (BA, PhD)

Alfred Whitney Griswold (October 27, 1906 – April 19, 1963) was an American historian and educator. He served as 16th president of Yale University from 1951 to 1963, during which he built much of Yale's modern scientific research infrastructure, especially on Science Hill.

== Early life ==
Griswold was born in Morristown, New Jersey, the son of Elsie Montgomery (Whitney) and Harold Ely Griswold. He graduated from Hotchkiss School in 1925, before earning his B.A. from Yale University in 1929, where he edited the campus humor magazine The Yale Record.

A member of the Griswold family, he was a descendant, on his mother's side, of Eli Whitney, and of six colonial governors of Connecticut on his father's side. As an undergraduate, Griswold, along with a handful of students and faculty members, founded the Yale Political Union.

== Career ==
He taught English for a year, then changed to history, which he taught at Yale from 1933, becoming an assistant professor in 1938, an associate professor in 1942, and a full professor in 1947. Griswold earned a Ph.D. in the new field of history, the arts and letters, writing the first dissertation in American studies in 1933. The American cult of success was the dissertation's subject, informed in part by Griswold's brief time on Wall Street between his graduation and the stock market crash of 1929.

Although Griswold previously had shown little interest in world affairs, in 1935 he joined the Yale Institute of International Studies and turned his attention to the history of foreign policy, working with Samuel Flagg Bemis. Bemis was a specialist on Latin America, so for insight on the Far East Griswold relied heavily on books by Tyler Dennett. Griswold's 1938 book, The Far Eastern Policy of the United States, for many years was the most influential work in the field. He had changed from being an ardent internationalist in his undergraduate years to becoming a non-interventionist in the late 1930s. He avoided calling himself an isolationist because of its negative connotations. He was an ardent liberal New Dealer, and feared that involvement in world affairs would lead to war and war would undermine American liberalism. He wanted American foreign-policy to focus on the Western Hemisphere, and ignore the problems in Europe and Asia.

By 1938, Griswold had broken with Roosevelt because of the president's increasing involvement in European and Asian affairs. He said that Washington should abandon its policy befriending China and instead establish friendlier relationships with Japan. He was deeply suspicious of Britain, which he believed was trying to trick or maneuver Roosevelt into pulling the United States into a world war. He opposed Lend Lease aid to Britain when it was facing Hitler alone. However, in the summer of 1941, he decided Hitler was America's greatest enemy and Hitler's alliance with Japan made any agreement with Tokyo impossible.

Griswold later authored Farming and Democracy (1948), Essays on Education (1954), In the University Tradition (1957), and Liberal Education and the Democratic Ideal (1959).

=== President of Yale University ===
In 1950, Griswold became president of Yale University, serving until his death in 1963. Griswold was unaware of his imminent rise to the presidency. The day of his elevation, he told his wife, "Thank God we're not in that racket", after they had lunched with a friend, the president of Mount Holyoke College. As president, Griswold is credited with tripling the university endowment to $375 million, building 26 new buildings and establishing research fellowships for young scholars, particularly in the sciences. He was arguably Yale's first modern president, and was widely quoted in the national media for his views on foreign affairs, amateur athletics, academic freedom, and in defense of the liberal arts against government intrusion. Griswold also worked in successful collaboration with Nathan Pusey, his counterpart at Harvard, to maintain amateurism in athletics among universities known now as the Ivy League.

The decision to create the eleventh and twelfth residential colleges at Yale, known as Morse College and Ezra Stiles College, was made by Griswold. In 1952, he established Master of Arts programs in teaching, affiliated with the traditional liberal arts departments. During World War II he headed special U.S. Army training programs in languages and civil affairs.

Ben Kiernan is the current A. Whitney Griswold Professor of History at Yale.

== Quotes ==
On ideas and the banishment of books:

Books won't stay banned. They won't burn. Ideas won't go to jail. In the long run of history, the censor and the inquisitor have always lost. The only sure weapon against bad ideas is better ideas. The source of better ideas is wisdom. The surest path to wisdom is a liberal education. —Alfred Whitney Griswold, Essays on Education

On coeducation at Yale:

By keeping in step with the male,/
we proceed at the pace of the snail./
Said the Dean of Admission,/
"Let's switch our position/
and get some fast women at Yale!"

== Personal life ==
Griswold married Mary Brooks (1906–1997) on June 10, 1930, in Scranton, Pennsylvania. His former home, at 237 East Rock Road in New Haven, is a contributing property in the Prospect Hill Historic District.

Griswold died of colon cancer in New Haven, Connecticut, and is buried in Grove Street Cemetery.

== Notes ==
Academic offices
Preceded by Charles Seymour	President of Yale University; 1950–1963	Succeeded by Kingman Brewster Jr.
