= Connecticut's 109th House of Representatives district =

House of Representatives district

Connecticut's 109th State House of Representatives district
Representative
Farley Santos; D

Connecticut's 109th House of Representatives district elects one member of the Connecticut House of Representatives. It encompasses parts of Danbury and has been represented by Democrat Farley Santos since 2023.

== List of representatives ==
List of representatives from Connecticut's 109th State House district
Representative	Party	Years	District home	Note
Mary Griswold	Democratic	1967–1973	New Haven	Seat created
William R. Ratchford	Democratic	1973–1975	Danbury	
Joseph Walkovich	Democratic	1975–1985	Danbury	
Lynn Taborsak	Democratic	1985–1993	Danbury	
Donald Boughton	Republican	1993–1997	Danbury	
Lewis Wallace	Democratic	1997–2007	Danbury	
Joseph Taborsak	Democratic	2007–2013	Danbury	
David Arconti	Democratic	2013–2023	Danbury	
Farley Santos	Democratic	2023–	Danbury	

== Recent elections ==
=== 2022 ===
2022 Connecticut State House of Representatives election, 109th District
Party	Candidate	Votes	%
Democratic	Farley Santos	2,998	53.48
Republican	Jesy Fernandez	2,487	44.36
Independent Party	Farley Santos	121	2.16
Total votes		6,117	100.0

=== 2020 ===
2020 Connecticut State House of Representatives election, District 109
Party	Candidate	Votes	%
Democratic	David Arconti (incumbent)	5,169	58.18
Republican	Michael Henry	3,273	36.84
Working Families	David Arconti (incumbent)	298	3.35
Independent Party	Michael Henry	144	1.62
Total votes		8,884	100.00
Democratic hold			

=== 2018 ===
2018 Connecticut House of Representatives election, District 109
Party	Candidate	Votes	%
Democratic	David Arconti (Incumbent)	3,807	63.8
Republican	Veasna Rouen	2,164	36.2
Total votes		5,971	100.00
Democratic hold			

=== 2016 ===
2016 Connecticut House of Representatives election, District 109
Party	Candidate	Votes	%
Democratic	David Arconti (Incumbent)	5,320	65.24
Republican	Veasna Rouen	2,835	34.76
Total votes		8,155	100.00
Democratic hold			

=== 2014 ===
2014 Connecticut House of Representatives election, District 109
Party	Candidate	Votes	%
Democratic	David Arconti (Incumbent)	2,722	57.3
Republican	Josh Stanley	1,680	35.4
Working Families	David Arconti (Incumbent)	205	4.3
Independent Party	Josh Stanley	144	3.0
Total votes		4,751	100.00
Democratic hold			

=== 2012 ===
2012 Connecticut House of Representatives election, District 109
Party	Candidate	Votes	%
Democratic	David Arconti	4,432	59.3
Republican	Andrew R. Wetmore	3,040	40.7
Total votes		7,472	100.00
Democratic hold			
