= Mary Griswold =

American politician (died 1997)

Member of the Connecticut House of Representatives from the 98th district
- In office 1973–1975
- Preceded by: Lucien DiMeo
- Succeeded by: Geil Orcutt

Member of the Connecticut House of Representatives from the 109th district
- In office 1967–1973
- Preceded by: Seat created
- Succeeded by: William R. Ratchford

Personal details
- Born: Mary Morgan Brooks; 1905 or 1906 Scranton, Pennsylvania, U.S.
- Died: November 15, 1997 (aged 91) Westwood, Massachusetts, U.S.
- Party: Democratic
- Spouse: Alfred Whitney Griswold (m. 1930; died 1963)
- Children: 4
- Education: The Masters School; Smith College

Mary Morgan Brooks Griswold (1905 or 1906 – November 15, 1997) was an American politician who served in the Connecticut House of Representatives. A Democrat, she represented the 109th district from 1967 to 1973, and the 98th district from 1973 to 1975. She was married to Alfred Whitney Griswold, president of Yale University from 1951 to 1963.

== Personal life and education ==
Mary Morgan Brooks was born in 1905 or 1906 in Scranton, Pennsylvania. She attended The Masters School in Dobbs Ferry, New York, and Smith College in Northampton, Massachusetts. She married Alfred Whitney Griswold on June 10, 1930. Together, they lived in New Haven, Connecticut, and had four children.

== Political career ==
A Democrat, Griswold was first elected to the Connecticut House of Representatives in 1966, and she served three terms representing the newly created 109th district. In 1972, Connecticut redistricted, and Griswold was reelected to represent the 98th district. She served one term and was succeeded in 1975 by fellow Democrat Geil Orcutt.

== Death ==
Griswold died on November 15, 1997, in Westwood, Massachusetts. She was 91.
