= Lynn Taborsak =

American politician

Member of the Connecticut House of Representatives from the 109th district
- In office 1985–1993
- Preceded by: Joseph Walkovich
- Succeeded by: Donald Boughton

Personal details
- Born: 1943 or 1944 Danbury, Connecticut, U.S.
- Party: Democratic; A Connecticut Party
- Children: Joseph Taborsak

Lynn H. Taborsak (born 1943 or 1944) is an American politician who served in the Connecticut House of Representatives from 1985 to 1993, representing the 109th district as a Democrat. In 1992, she unsuccessfully ran to represent Connecticut's 5th congressional district in the U.S. Congress as a member of A Connecticut Party. Republican incumbent Gary Franks won the election. In 2012, she unsuccessfully ran for mayor of Danbury. Republican incumbent Mark D. Boughton defeated her. She previously worked as a schoolteacher and a plumber and is the mother of politician Joseph Taborsak.
