= 2018 Connecticut State Comptroller election =

- November 6, 2018

Nominee	Kevin Lembo	Kurt Miller
Party	Democratic	Republican
Alliance	Working Families	Independent
Popular vote	746,806	585,510
Percentage	55.1%	43.2%
- Lembo: 40–50% 50–60% 60–70% 70–80% 80–90% 90–100% Miller: 40–50% 50–60% 60–70%
Comptroller before election
Kevin Lembo
Democratic
Elected Comptroller
Kevin Lembo
Democratic

The 2018 Connecticut State Comptroller election took place on November 6, 2018, to elect the next Connecticut State Comptroller. Incumbent Democrat Kevin Lembo was re-elected to a third term, defeating Republican nominee Kurt Miller.

== Democratic primary ==
=== Candidates ===
==== Nominee ====
- Kevin Lembo, incumbent state comptroller (2011–2021)

== Republican primary ==
=== Candidates ===
==== Nominee ====
- Kurt Miller, first selectman of Seymour

==== Lost in primary ====
- Mark Greenberg, businessman from Litchfield

=== Results ===
Republican primary results
Party	Candidate	Votes	%
Republican	Kurt Miller	68,846	52.44%
Republican	Mark Greenberg	62,440	47.56%
Total votes		131,286	100.0%

== Third party candidates ==
=== Working Families ===
The Working Families Party endorsed Lembo, giving him access to a second ballot line. Official designee

- Kevin Lembo, incumbent state comptroller

=== Independent Party of Connecticut ===
The Independent Party of Connecticut endorsed Miller, giving him access to a second ballot line. Official designee

- Kurt Miller, first selectman of Seymour

=== Libertarian Party ===
==== Nominee ====
- Paul Passarelli, CEO of Solar and Thermal Systems, Inc. and nominee for U.S. Senator in 2012

=== Green Party ===
==== Nominee ====
- Edward Heflin, entrepreneur and candidate for state senator from the 36th district in 2016

== General election ==
=== Results ===
2018 Connecticut State Comptroller election
Party	Candidate	Votes	%	±%
Democratic	Kevin Lembo	718,033	52.96%	+0.67%
Working Families	Kevin Lembo	28,773	2.12%	−0.80%
Total	Kevin Lembo (incumbent)	746,806	55.08%	+2.79%
Republican	Kurt Miller	563,099	41.53%	−4.49%
Independent Party	Kurt Miller	22,411	1.65%	−1.08%
Total	Kurt Miller	585,510	43.18%	−2.84%
Libertarian	Paul Passarelli	13,165	0.97%	N/A
Green	Edward Heflin	10,360	0.76%	−0.94%
Total votes		1,355,838	100.0%	
Democratic hold				

==== By congressional district ====
Lembo won all five congressional districts.

District	Lembo	Miller	Representative
1st	60%	39%	John B. Larson
2nd	52%	46%	Joe Courtney
3rd	57%	41%	Rosa DeLauro
4th	56%	43%	Jim Himes
5th	51%	47%	Elizabeth Esty (115th Congress)
5th	51%	47%	Jahana Hayes (116th Congress)
