= Janet Poss =

American politician (died 2019)

Member of the Connecticut House of Representatives from the 98th district
- In office 1991–1995
- Preceded by: Francis X. O'Neill Jr.
- Succeeded by: Patricia Widlitz

Personal details
- Born: Janet Champney; 1922 or 1923 Bedford, Massachusetts, U.S.
- Died: February 24, 2019 (aged 96)
- Party: Democratic
- Spouse: Eliasz Poss
- Children: 2
- Education: Boston College

Janet Poss (née Champney; 1922 or 1923 – February 24, 2019) was an American politician who served in the Connecticut House of Representatives from 1991 to 1995, representing the 98th district as a Democrat.

== Personal life ==
Janet Champney was born in Bedford, Massachusetts. She attended Boston College and worked at Columbia University before moving to Guilford, Connecticut, in 1964 with her husband, Eliasz Poss, and their two sons. She remained a resident of Guilford until her death.

== Political career ==
=== Connecticut House of Representatives ===
Poss was elected to the Connecticut House of Representatives in 1990, and she served two terms representing the 98th district as a Democrat. She did not run for reelection in 1994, and her successor, Patricia Widlitz, who would serve from 1995 to 2015, ran for the seat at Poss' encouragement. Widlitz, who had previously chaired Poss' second campaign, remarked that Poss "insisted on chairing my campaign".

==== 1991 income tax vote ====
In 1991, Connecticut faced a projected 1991-92 budget deficit of over $1 billion, which Governor Lowell Weicker proposed addressing with budget cuts and the implementation of a personal income tax. The income tax was passed in August 1991 but was widely unpopular, leading to one of the largest protests in state history on October 5, 1991, when over 40,000 people gathered at the Connecticut State Capitol to demand repeal. Poss supported the income tax and stated that she would not vote for a repeal unless a viable alternative for addressing the budget were presented. She and other supporters of the tax were notably subject to harassment, death threats, and political violence over the issue throughout 1991.

On October 3, 1991, an unknown perpetrator fired a gun at Poss' house while she, her husband, and her son David were home. The bullet traveled through an exterior door and across the living room before lodging in the staircase. The family heard the noise from another room and investigated, but found no evidence of the shot until October 5, when David noticed the bullet hole in the door. Poss stated that the incident was "obviously" due to her vote for the income tax, but she was undeterred and remarked "If this is the extent of the intimidation, it only makes me feel more strong-minded to do what I think is right". Poss subsequently received a phone call during which she was told, "I'm sorry they shot at your house. I wish they shot you."

== Death ==
Poss died on February 24, 2019. She was 96.
