= David Arconti =

American politician

Member of the Connecticut House of Representatives from the 109th district
- In office January 9, 2013 – 2023
- Preceded by: Joseph Taborsak
- Succeeded by: Farley Santos

Personal details
- Born: September 22, 1986 (age 39) Danbury, Connecticut, U.S.
- Party: Democratic

David A. Arconti Jr. (born September 22, 1986) is an American politician who has served in the Connecticut House of Representatives from the 109th district since 2013.

On July 25th, he was nominated by Connecticut governor Ned Lamont to be commissioner of the Connecticut Public Utilities Regulatory Authority after its incumbent commissioner, John W. "Jack" Betkoski III, faced controversy over clashing with its chairperson, Marissa Gillett.
