= Farley Santos =

American politician

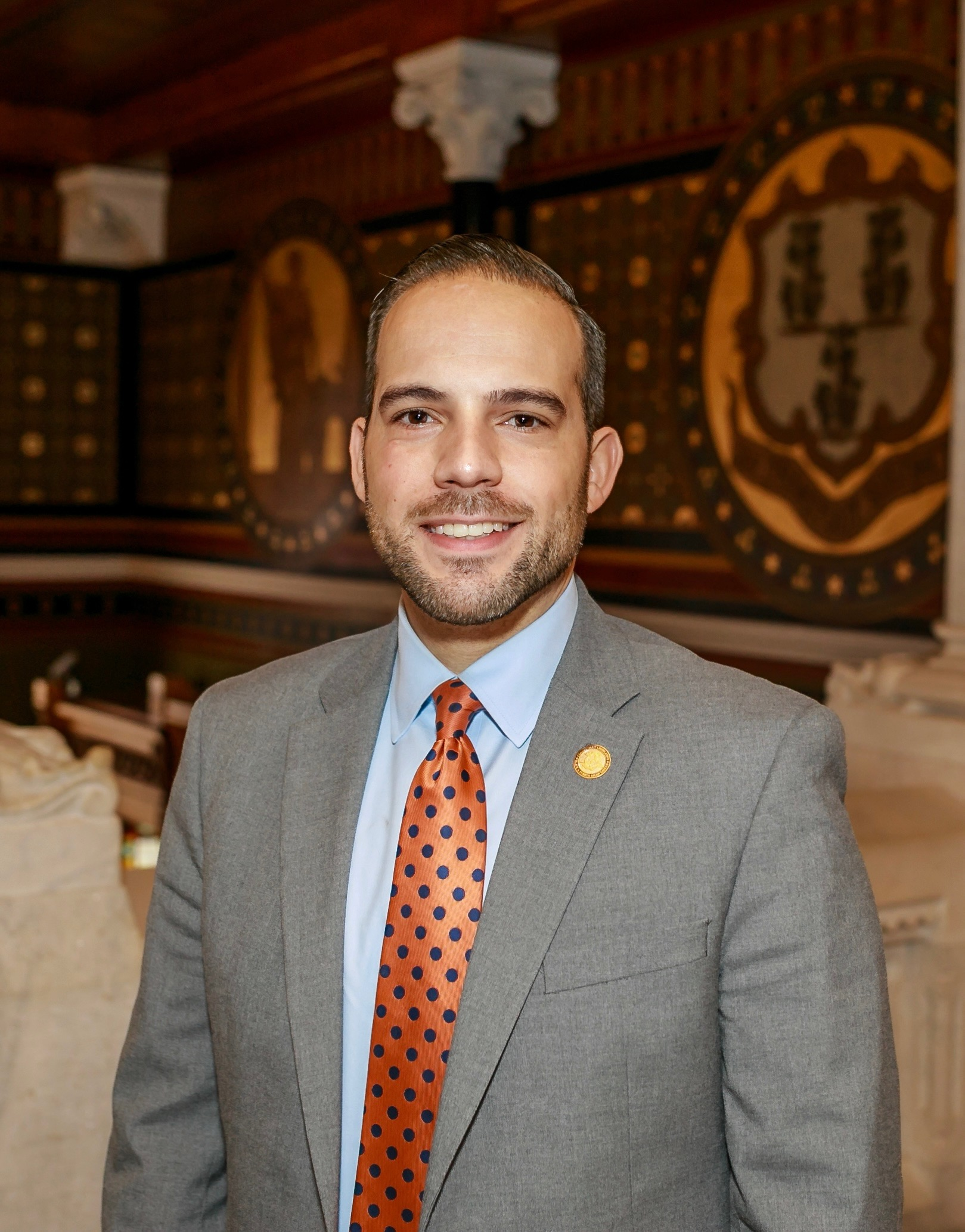
- Farley Santos

Member of the Connecticut House of Representatives from the 109th district
- Incumbent
- Assumed office 2023
- Preceded by: David Arconti

Personal details
- Born: 1989 (age 36–37) Brazil
- Party: Democrat

Farley Santos (born 1989) is an American politician. He is a Democratic member of the Connecticut House of Representatives serving in the 109th district since 2022. In December 2023, Santos was appointed, in addition to his elected office, by Roberto L. Alves, Mayor of Danbury, Connecticut, as Community Relations and Constituent Services Advisor. In June 2024, he was elevated to a different role in Mayor Alves' office. He currently serves as Economic and Community Development Advisor.
