= Connecticut's 98th House of Representatives district =

American legislative district

Connecticut's 98th State House of Representatives district
Representative
Moira Rader; D

Connecticut's 98th House of Representatives district elects one member of the Connecticut House of Representatives. It encompasses parts of Branford and Guilford and has been represented by Democrat Moira Rader since 2022.

== List of representatives ==
List of representatives from Connecticut's 98th State House district
Representative	Party	Years	District home	Note
Milton I. Caplan	Democratic	1967–1971	Hamden	Seat created
Lucien DiMeo	Republican	1971–1973	Hamden	
Mary Griswold	Democratic	1973–1975	New Haven	
Geil Orcutt	Democratic	1975–1983	New Haven	
Francis X. O'Neill Jr.	Republican	1983–1991	East Hartford	
Janet Poss	Democratic	1991–1995	Guilford	
Patricia Widlitz	Democratic	1995–2015	Guilford	
Sean Scanlon	Democratic	2015–2023	Guilford	
Moira Rader	Democratic	2023–	Guilford	

== Recent elections ==
=== 2020 ===
2020 Connecticut State House of Representatives election, District 98
Party	Candidate	Votes	%
Democratic	Sean Scanlon (incumbent)	10,464	90.72
Working Families	Sean Scanlon (incumbent)	1,070	9.28
Total votes		11,534	100.00
Democratic hold			

=== 2018 ===
2018 Connecticut House of Representatives election, District 98
Party	Candidate	Votes	%
Democratic	Sean Scanlon	9,434	100.00
Democratic hold			

=== 2016 ===
2016 Connecticut House of Representatives election, District 98
Party	Candidate	Votes	%
Democratic	Sean Scanlon	10,599	100.00
Democratic hold			

=== 2014 ===
2014 Connecticut House of Representatives election, District 98
Party	Candidate	Votes	%
Democratic	Sean Scanlon	5,421	52.1
Republican	Cindy Cartier	4,469	43.0
Independent Party	Cindy Cartier	269	2.6
Working Families	Sean Scanlon	240	2.3
Total votes		10,339	100.00
Democratic hold			

=== 2012 ===
2012 Connecticut House of Representatives election, District 98
Party	Candidate	Votes	%
Democratic	Patricia Widlitz (Incumbent)	9,031	100.00
Democratic hold			
