= Arthur Smithies =

American economist

- Born: December 12, 1907; Lindisfarne, Tasmania, Australia
- Died: September 9, 1981 (aged 73); Cambridge, Massachusetts, USA
- Education: University of Tasmania; University of Oxford; Harvard University
- Spouse: Katharine Hermione Ripman (m. 1935)
- Children: 2
- Scientific career
- Fields: Economics
- Doctoral advisor: Joseph Schumpeter
- Doctoral students: Guy Orcutt; Thomas Schelling; Herbert Gintis; James Duesenberry; Otto Eckstein

Arthur Smithies (December 12, 1907 – September 9, 1981) was an American economist.

== Early life and education ==
Arthur Smithies was born in Lindisfarne, Tasmania on December 12, 1907 to John Smithies Hilda Annie Smithies (née Stephenson).

After graduating from The Hutchins School, Smithies received a Bachelor of Laws from the University of Tasmania (1929), a Bachelor of Arts from Magdalen College, Oxford (1932), and a Doctor of Philosophy from Harvard University (1934).

== Career ==
Smithies worked at the Commonwealth Bureau of Census and Statistics, Canberra (1935–1938), the University of Michigan (1938–1943), the Bureau of the Budget in Washington, DC (1943–1938), where he managed the Marshall Plan, and Harvard University (1948–1978), where he chaired the economics department (1950–55, 1959–61) and was master of the Kirkland House (1965–74), retiring in 1978. He was the editor of The Quarterly Journal of Economics (1957–65), and founded the Journal of Economic Abstracts (1962).

As an economist, Smithies aligned with Keynesian economics and studied macroeconomics, location theory, and Schumpeterian economics.

== Personal life ==
Smithies married Katharine Hermione Ripman on February 22, 1935, with whom he eventually had two daughters. He became a naturalized US citizen in 1943.

Smithies died from myocardial infarction on September 9, 1981; he was living in Cambridge, Massachusetts at the time.

== Sources and further reading ==
- Obituary, New York Times, 11 September 1981
- Obituary, Harvard Crimson, 14 September 1981
- History of Economic Thought
