= Sean Scanlon (politician) =

American politician (born 1986)

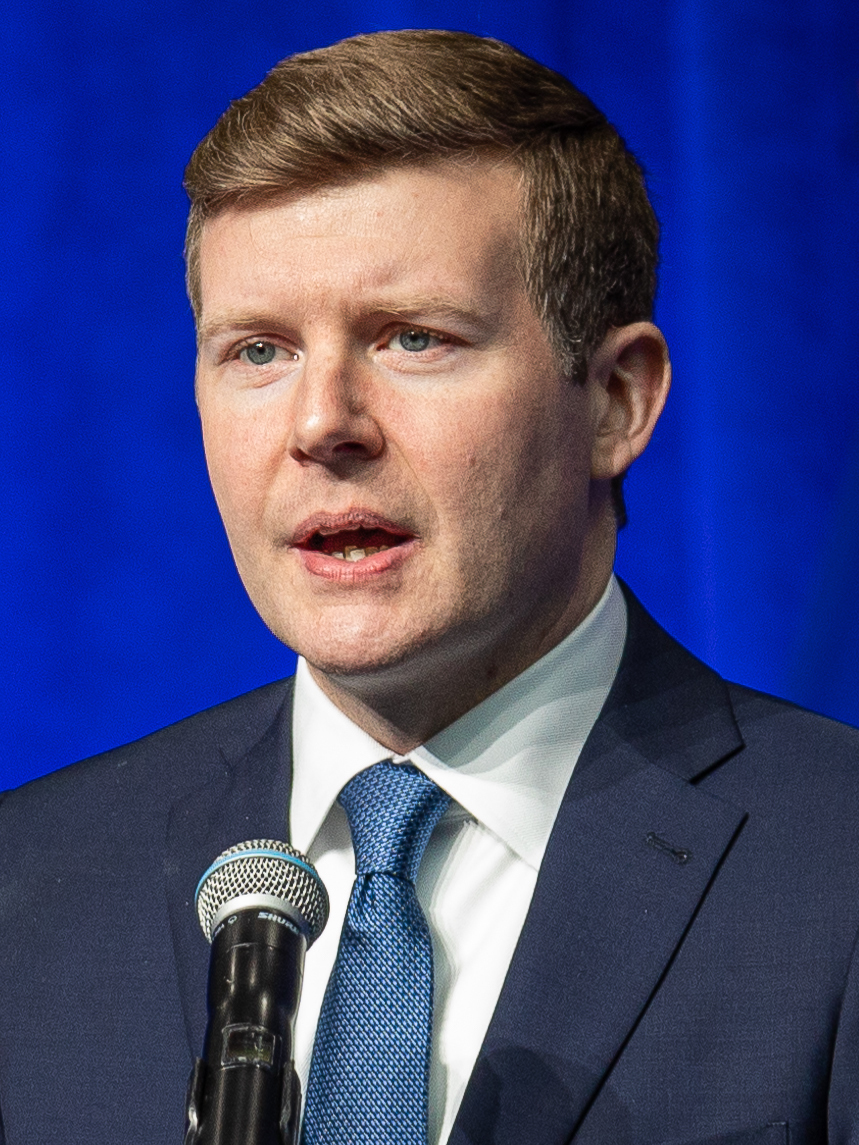
- Scanlon in 2023

67th Comptroller of Connecticut
- Incumbent
- Assumed office January 4, 2023
- Governor: Ned Lamont
- Preceded by: Natalie Braswell

Member of the Connecticut House of Representatives from the 98th district
- In office January 7, 2015 – January 4, 2023
- Preceded by: Patricia Widlitz
- Succeeded by: Moira Rader

Personal details
- Born: Sean Matthew Scanlon; December 20, 1986 (age 39) New Haven, Connecticut, U.S.
- Party: Democratic
- Spouse: Meghan Scanlon (m. 2017)
- Children: 2
- Education: Boston College (BA)

Sean Matthew Scanlon (born December 20, 1986) is an American politician who is the current Comptroller of Connecticut. Scanlon previously served in the Connecticut House of Representatives from the 98th district.

== Early life and career ==
Scanlon was born on December 20, 1986, in New Haven, Connecticut, to Kathy (nee LaValle) and John Scanlon. Scanlon's mother was a small business owner and his father was a retired New York City Police officer.

After graduating from Boston College in 2008, Scanlon worked as a Victim Advocate in the office of the New York County District Attorney before serving as an aide to Chris Murphy from 2009 to 2019.

Since November 2019, Scanlon has served as Executive Director of Tweed New Haven Airport As Executive Director, Scanlon negotiated a $100 million deal to expand the length of the airport's runway, build a new terminal and welcome a new air carrier to New Haven.

== Connecticut Legislature ==
=== Elections ===
In 2014, at age 27, Scanlon was elected to the Connecticut House of Representatives 54%-46%. He ran unopposed in 2016, 2018 and 2020.

=== Tenure ===
During his first term, Scanlon led the legislature's effort to combat Connecticut's opioid epidemic and became a leading voice on issues of mental health and addiction. As a freshman legislator he worked to pass legislation requiring education for doctors and other prescribers on prescription drug abuse, cracked down on "doctor shopping" for prescription drugs, and allowed pharmacists to prescribe life-saving anti-overdose drugs like Narcan over the counter.

In 2016 Scanlon wrote and sponsored legislation making Connecticut the second state in the nation to limit first-time opioid prescriptions to a seven day supply with exemptions for chronic pain as a way of reducing the number of unused and expired drugs in our communities.

=== Insurance and Real Estate Committee ===
In his second term Scanlon became chairman of the Insurance and Real Estate committee.

During four years as co-chairman, Sean wrote and passed legislation protecting people with pre-existing conditions from insurance discrimination establishing the lowest monthly co-pay cap for insulin in the nation at $25 preventing insurance companies from covering mental health different than physical health requiring health insurance plans to cover ten "Essential Health Benefits" such as maternity care and hospital visits creating Connecticut's first prescription drug price transparency law requiring drug companies to justify large price increases and instituting the first insurance and consumer safety standards for ride-share services like Uber and Lyft

=== Gun Safety ===
In 2018, Scanlon worked with constituents Kristin and Mike Song to introduce Ethan's Law in honor of their 15 year old son Ethan Song who was killed in a tragic gun accident. The bill became the first bipartisan gun safety legislation in recent history.

=== Finance, Revenue and Bonding Committee ===
At the start of his fourth term became chairman of the legislature's Finance, Revenue and Bonding committee

In his first term as chairman, Scanlon pushed for the creation of a state child tax credit and helped negotiate a bipartisan, no tax increase state budget

== State Comptroller campaign ==
On 4 April 2022, Scanlon announced his candidacy for state comptroller in the 2022 election.

Party political offices
Preceded by Kevin Lembo	Democratic nominee for Comptroller of Connecticut; 2022, 2026	Most recent
Political offices
Preceded by Natalie Braswell	Comptroller of Connecticut; 2023–present	Incumbent
