= Kevin Lembo =

American politician (born 1963)

Comptroller of Connecticut
- In office January 5, 2011 – December 31, 2021
- Governor: Dan Malloy; Ned Lamont
- Preceded by: Nancy Wyman
- Succeeded by: Natalie Braswell

Personal details
- Born: September 6, 1963 (age 62) Paterson, New Jersey, U.S.
- Party: Democratic
- Spouse: Charles Frey
- Children: 3
- Education: Charter Oak State College (BA); California State University (MPA)

Kevin P. Lembo (born September 6, 1963) is a Democratic elected official who served as the Connecticut State Comptroller, the statewide elected official responsible for reporting on state finances, administering health care plans for public employees and retirees, and paying the state's bills. He took office on January 5, 2011 and resigned effective December 31, 2021. Lembo is the first openly gay individual to be elected to statewide office in Connecticut.

== Biography ==
In 2004, Lembo became Connecticut's first State Healthcare Advocate, and was reconfirmed to the position in 2008. Along with Nancy Wyman, his predecessor in the Comptroller's office, he was co-chair of the state SustiNet healthcare plan.

In 2010, Lembo won the endorsement of the Connecticut Democratic Party at their state convention, and later defeated Waterbury, CT mayor Michael Jarjura in the August 10, 2010 Democratic primary. In the November 2 general election, he defeated Republican candidate Jack Orchulli. Lembo won a second term by defeating Republican Sharon McLaughlin in 2014. After declining to pursue a run for governor in 2018, Lembo won a third term as Comptroller by defeating Republican Kurt Miller of Seymour in a landslide victory.

As Comptroller, Lembo has launched several transparency websites and won a political victory when Governor Dannel Malloy, a Democrat, signed an Executive Order creating a database of state business tax credits at Lembo's insistence. In 2013, the Council on Freedom of Information awarded Lembo the Bice Clemow Freedom of Information Award in recognition of his commitment to transparency.

Lembo and Malloy clashed frequently. Lembo opposed several of Malloy's economic development projects including a $22 million grant to Bridgewater Associates, the largest hedge fund in the world. Lembo also voted against a $10 million study regarding highway tolls. The two have also disagreed numerous times over the status of Connecticut's financial outlook.

Lembo co-chaired the Connecticut Retirement Security Board in 2016, earning passage of legislation aimed at giving private-sector workers access to retirement savings accounts if one is not offered by their employer. The program is estimated to serve approximately 600,000 Connecticut workers.

In 2018, Lembo authored legislation forcing pharmaceutical corporations to disclose details of how they set prescription drug prices. The bill passed the General Assembly unanimously. As Comptroller, he has often clashed with drug companies, banning compound drug sales that cost millions of dollars per year and uncovering a kickback scheme that has resulted in a lawsuit by the State Attorney General.

In 2019, Lembo and a coalition of health care reform advocates, fought for the creation of a public health care option. The effort ultimately failed when Cigna, a major insurance carrier in the state, threatened to leave Connecticut if a public option became law, as revealed by Lembo to the Hartford Courant. Although Lembo and several allies continued to support the bill, other Democratic supporters abandoned the policy, leading to its demise in the legislature.

Lembo was targeted by the anti-gay American Family Association in 2016 after removing them from a state-sponsored charitable giving campaign. The AFA responded by flooding the Comptroller's Office with phone calls and emails.

On December 3, 2021, Lembo announced his resignation, effective December 31, due to a heart condition.

== Personal life and education ==
Lembo is married to Charles Frey and lives in Guilford, Connecticut. They have three adult children. Lembo and Frey are also licensed foster parents. The adoption of the couple's oldest children resulted in a lawsuit against the state of New York after a judge denied the finalization of the adoption because Lembo and Frey were an unmarried same-sex couple.

Lembo earned a B.A. at Charter Oak State College in 2002, and a Master's in Public Administration from California State University in 2004.

== Awards ==
In 2004, Lembo was commissioned as a Kentucky colonel for his work as an advocate for children in foster care. For his work promoting open government, he received the Bice Clemow Award from the Connecticut Council on Freedom of Information in 2013. Lembo earned the AARP Legislative Achievement Award in 2016 for his leadership of the Connecticut Retirement Security Board. GLAD gave Lembo its Social Justice Award in 2017. The Norwich, CT chapter of the NAACP honored Lembo with its 2019 Robertsine Duncan Memorial Award given to an individual or organization for outstanding efforts to ensure quality education for children while being an advocate on behalf of the community, city and state.

== Electoral history ==
Connecticut Comptroller Democratic Primary Election, 2010
Party	Candidate	Votes	%
Democratic	Kevin Lembo	117,185	70.00
Democratic	Michael Jarjura	50,218	30.00

Connecticut Comptroller Election, 2010
Party	Candidate	Votes	%
Democratic*	Kevin Lembo	577,547	53.56
Republican	Jack Orchulli	459,474	42.61
Independent	Hugh Dolan	17,701	1.64
Green	Colin Bennett	13,288	1.23
Libertarian	Joshua Katz	10,328	0.96

*Lembo was also listed on the Working Families Party line.

Connecticut Comptroller Election, 2014
Party	Candidate	Votes	%
Democratic*	Kevin Lembo (inc.)	538,280	52.29
Republican*	Sharon McLaughlin	473,752	46.02
Green	Rolf Maurer	17,458	1.70

*Lembo was also listed on the Working Families Party line; McLaughlin was also listed on the Independent Party line.

Connecticut Comptroller Election, 2018
Party	Candidate	Votes	%
Democratic*	Kevin Lembo	746,806	56.0%
Republican	Kurt Miller	563,099	42.23%
Libertarian	Paul Passarelli	13,165	< 1%
Green	Edward Heflin	10,360	< 1%

*Lembo was also listed on the Working Families Party line.

Party political offices
Preceded by Nancy Wyman	Democratic nominee for Connecticut State Comptroller; 2010, 2014, 2018	Succeeded by Sean Scanlon
Political offices
Preceded by Nancy Wyman	Comptroller of Connecticut; 2011–2021	Succeeded by Natalie Braswell
