= Donald Paige Frary =

American academic and writer (1893–1919)

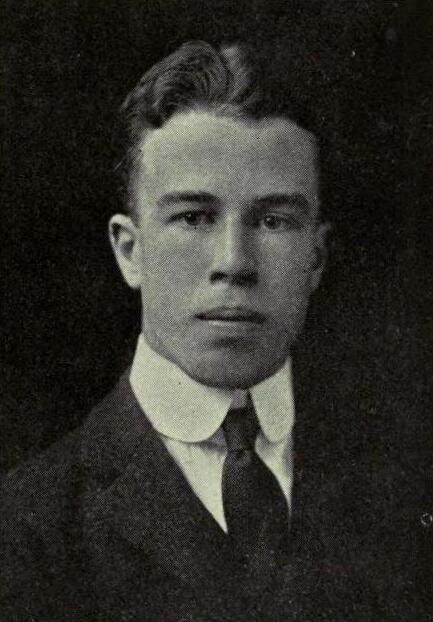
- Frary in a 1914 publication
- Born: August 9, 1893; Charlemont, Massachusetts, U.S.
- Died: April 6, 1919 (aged 25); Paris, France
- Occupations: Educator; writer

Donald Paige Frary (August 9, 1893 – April 6, 1919) was an American professor and writer.

== Early life ==
Donald Paige Frary was born on August 9, 1893, in Charlemont, Massachusetts, Caroline Louise (née Paige) to Edward Sanderson Frary. His father owned Frary Spool Company. The family also lived in Waterbury, Vermont. They moved to Berlin, New York, where he attended Berlin High School and Worcester Academy. He graduated from Yale University in 1914. He was a member of Beta Theta Pi and a member of the Yale orchestra. He won a Berkeley premium and Donald Annis prize. He was a contributor to Lit and the Hartford Courant. Frary taught for a year in China and then took up post-graduate studies in history and economics at Yale.

== Career ==
Frary was a professor at Yale. He specialized in international affairs. During his tenure at Yale Frary completed two books that established him as one of the pre-eminent scholars on the subject of Eastern Europe. His third book, "How the World Votes," co-authored with fellow Yale professor Charles Seymour, garnered considerably more critical praise, so much so that nearly a century later it is still considered one of the best books on the electoral process. He was appointed as an aide in the United States Department of State. He was chosen as a member of the Paris Peace Conference, 1919 by President Woodrow Wilson due to his knowledge of events in Bulgaria. He served as secretary to Colonel Edward M. House during the conference.

== Personal life ==
Frary lived in Berlin. He died of Spanish influenza and pneumonia on April 6, 1919, at an American hospital in Paris.

== Works ==
- Elections and Democracy in Russia, 1917
- Magyars and Jugoslavs, 1918
- How the World Votes: The Story of Democratic Development in Elections, 1918 (co-authored with Charles Seymour)

=== Further reading ===
- The Frary Family in America: 1637–1980, by Margaret Murphy and Anne Frary Lepak, The Frary Family Association, 1980.
- The Frary Family in America: A Continuation, by Anne Frary Lepak, The Frary Family Association, 1985.
