= CityCenter Danbury =

Redevelopment project in Connecticut, US

Official logo of the project

CityCenter Danbury is a redevelopment project located in the downtown core of Danbury, Connecticut. The special taxing district was formed by Main Street's merchants in the late 1980s with the goal of bringing more people and businesses into the Danbury city center, and to revitalize the downtown core.

== Background ==
The local economy fell in the early 1990s, and the city hired a consultant to look at plans to cluster retailers into the downtown core to hopefully compete with shopping malls for the consumers' dollars.

A broad revitalization of the city's center began in 1996. Achievements include the redevelopment of the former police station; the revamped retail center on Crosby Street developed by BRT Corp.; and the Danbury Ice Arena, which was built in 1999 and expanded in 2004.
