= Guy Orcutt =

American econometrician

Guy H. Orcutt
- Born: July 5, 1917; Wyandotte, Michigan
- Died: March 5, 2006 (aged 88); Bowie, Maryland
- Education: University of Michigan
- Known for: Cochrane–Orcutt estimation
- Spouse: Geil Orcutt (m. 1941; died 2001)
- Children: Alice Nakamura; Harriet Orcutt Duleep
- Scientific career
- Fields: Econometrics
- Doctoral advisor: Arthur Smithies
- Doctoral students: Edwin Kuh; John R. Meyer; Alice Rivlin

Guy Henderson Orcutt (July 5, 1917 – March 5, 2006) was an American econometrician. He was a long-time faculty member at the University of Wisconsin–Madison, and is known for developing the Cochrane–Orcutt estimation procedure.

A native of Michigan, Orcutt earned his bachelor's, master's and doctorate degree from the University of Michigan. He married Geil Orcutt on June 24, 1941.

In 1959 he was elected as a Fellow of the American Statistical Association.
