= Natalie Braswell =

American lawyer and public servant

Interim Chancellor Connecticut State Colleges and Universities
- Incumbent
- Assumed office June 15, 2026
- Governor: Ned Lamont
- Preceded by: Lloyd Blanchard

Comptroller of Connecticut
- In office December 31, 2021 – January 4, 2023
- Governor: Ned Lamont
- Preceded by: Kevin Lembo
- Succeeded by: Sean Scanlon

Personal details
- Party: Democratic
- Education: University of Connecticut (BA, MPA, JD)

Natalie A. Braswell is an American lawyer and public servant who served as Connecticut State Comptroller, one of the state's six constitutional officers and its chief fiscal guardian. Braswell was Connecticut's first African-American comptroller. She was appointed to fill the year-long unexpired term of Kevin Lembo. In May 2026, she was appointed the interim chancellor of the Connecticut State Community College.

== Early life ==
Braswell attended the University of Connecticut, from which she received a BA in political science in 2000, an MPA in public administration in 2002, and a JD in 2007.

== Career ==
Braswell began her career working as an associate attorney with the law office of Updike, Kelly & Spacey in Hartford from 2007 to 2011. From 2011 to 2021, she worked as general counsel and assistant comptroller under Kevin Lembo. Her duties included managing all legal affairs for the Office of the State Comptroller, negotiating and preparing contracts, overseeing procurement processes, and serving as the office's ethics liaison. She has taught legal practice as an adjunct professor at UConn School of Law and served on the school's foundation board and its diversity, equity, and belonging committee. She served as vice president of the George W. Crawford Black Bar Association from 2007 to 2011. She is a member of the Connecticut Bar Association.

Starting in March 2021, Braswell became chief of legal, planning and regulatory affairs at the Connecticut Department of Energy and Environmental Protection. She is a Democrat. Governor Ned Lamont appointed Braswell to be comptroller effective December 31, 2021, after Kevin Lembo resigned due to ill health. Following the example of Governor William A. O'Neill, Lamont appointed Braswell as a caretaker after she committed not to seek a full four-year term. She served until the next comptroller, Sean Scanlon, assumed office on January 3, 2023.

In May 2026, she was appointed the interim chancellor of the Connecticut State Community College.

== Personal life ==
Braswell lives with her husband, Robert, and daughter, Gabby, in Bloomfield, Connecticut.

== See also ==
- List of Connecticut State University System executives

Political offices
Preceded by Kevin Lembo	Comptroller of Connecticut; 2021–2023	Succeeded by Sean Scanlon
