= Donald Boughton =

American politician

Member of the Connecticut House of Representatives from the 109th district
- In office January 6, 1993 – January 8, 1997
- Preceded by: Lynn Taborsak
- Succeeded by: Lewis Wallace

Personal details
- Born: April 15, 1935 Danbury, Connecticut
- Died: November 2, 2011 (aged 76) Danbury, Connecticut
- Party: Republican

Donald Boughton (April 15, 1935 – November 2, 2011) was an American politician who served in the Connecticut House of Representatives from the 109th district from 1993 to 1997.

He died on November 2, 2011, in Danbury, Connecticut at age 76.
