= Harriet Orcutt Duleep =

American labor economist

- Born: 1953 (age 72–73)

Academic background
- Education: University of Michigan (BA); Massachusetts Institute of Technology (PhD)
- Doctoral advisor: Jerry Hausman; Lester Thurow

Academic work
- Institutions: College of William and Mary; Social Security Administration; Urban Institute

Harriet Orcutt Duleep (born 1953) is a research professor with The Thomas Jefferson Program in Public Policy of the College of William and Mary.

== Research ==
Duleep's dozens of published papers have included such topics as immigration, mortality, and women's labor force behavior. She is an expert on immigration to the United States, and has published many studies on the impact of immigration on the Social Security System.

Her work (with Seth Sanders) has shown that improving wages for Asian Americans in the United States in the 20th Century were due to the easing of employer prejudices. She has written and spoken about the importance of family-linked immigration for economic growth in the United States.

=== Selected works ===
- Duleep, Harriet Orcutt, and Mark C. Regets. "Immigrants and human-capital investment." American Economic Review 89, no. 2 (1999): 186–191.
- Duleep, Harriet Orcutt. "Measuring the effect of income on adult mortality using longitudinal administrative record data." Journal of Human Resources (1986): 238–251.
- Duleep, Harriet Orcutt, and Seth Sanders. "The decision to work by married immigrant women." ILR Review 46, no. 4 (1993): 677–690.
- Duleep, Harriet Orcutt. "Measuring socioeconomic mortality differentials over time." Demography 26, no. 2 (1989): 345–351.
- Duleep, Harriet Orcutt, and Mark C. Regets. "Measuring immigrant wage growth using matched CPS files." Demography 34, no. 2 (1997): 239–249.
