= Shomrim =

Shom(e)rim may refer to:

- Shomrim (neighborhood watch group), Orthodox Jewish civilian volunteer patrols
- Shomrim Society, fraternal organization of Jewish police officers
- Shomer, a custodian in Jewish law, singular of shomrim
- Shemira, the Jewish custom of watching over a dead body before burial; watchers are known as shomrim
- Hashomer (Hebrew: השומר, "The Watchman"), a Jewish defense organization in Palestine
- Hashomer Hatzair youth movement
