= Margin for Error (play) =

1939 play by Clare Boothe Luce

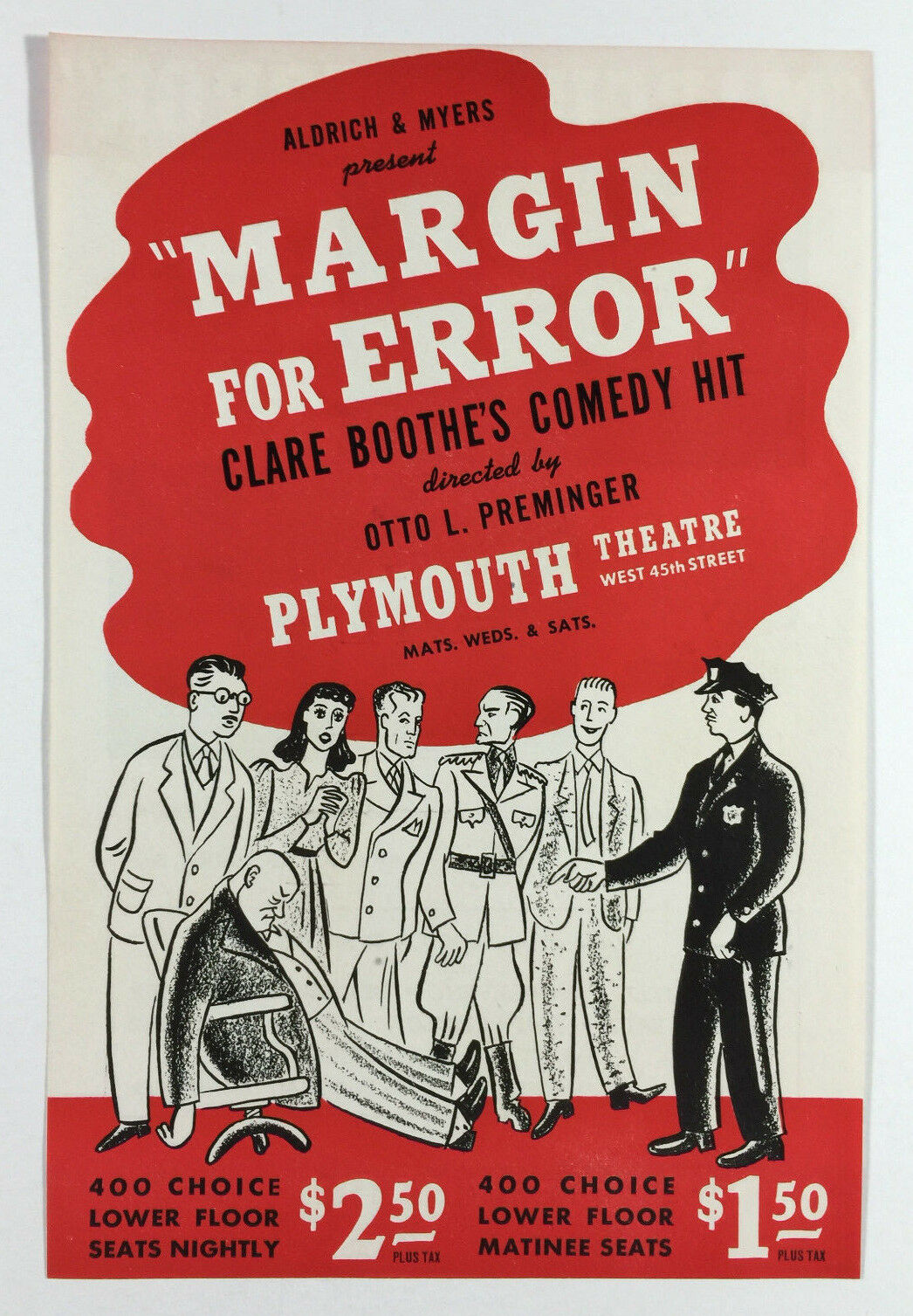
- Flyer for the Broadway production
- Original language: English
- Written by: Clare Boothe Luce
- Genre: Satire

Premiere
- Date: November 3, 1939
- Place: Plymouth Theatre

Margin for Error is a two-act play written in 1939 by Clare Boothe Luce. It is a satire of Nazism, and was staged on Broadway shortly after World War II began in Europe. The plot is a whodunit about the murder of a German consul in the United States. The play was adapted as a movie of the same name in 1943.

== History ==
Otto Preminger directed and starred as the German consul in the Broadway production which was produced by Richard Aldrich. After a preview in Princeton, New Jersey in October, the play opened on November 3, 1939, at the Plymouth Theatre, where it ran for 264 performances. Preminger reprised the role for a national tour in the summer of 1940.

== Plot ==
Officer Finkelstein, a Jewish policeman, is assigned to protect Karl Baumer, the consul for Nazi Germany in an American city. While hosting a group of people listening to a radio broadcast of a speech by Adolf Hitler, Baumer is apparently murdered. Finkelstein's investigation discovers that each of the others present has a motive for murdering Baumer. Dr. Jennings paid to get relatives out of Germany, only to discover Baumer has cheated him. Sophie Baumer hated her husband's cruelty and amorality. Baumer threatened to expose the Jewish ancestry of Baron Max von Alvenstor, and planned to kill Otto Horst. Thomas Denny, an American journalist, hates Baumer's Nazi ideology. All the suspects are found to be innocent; Baumer accidentally drank poison that he had prepared to murder one of his guests.

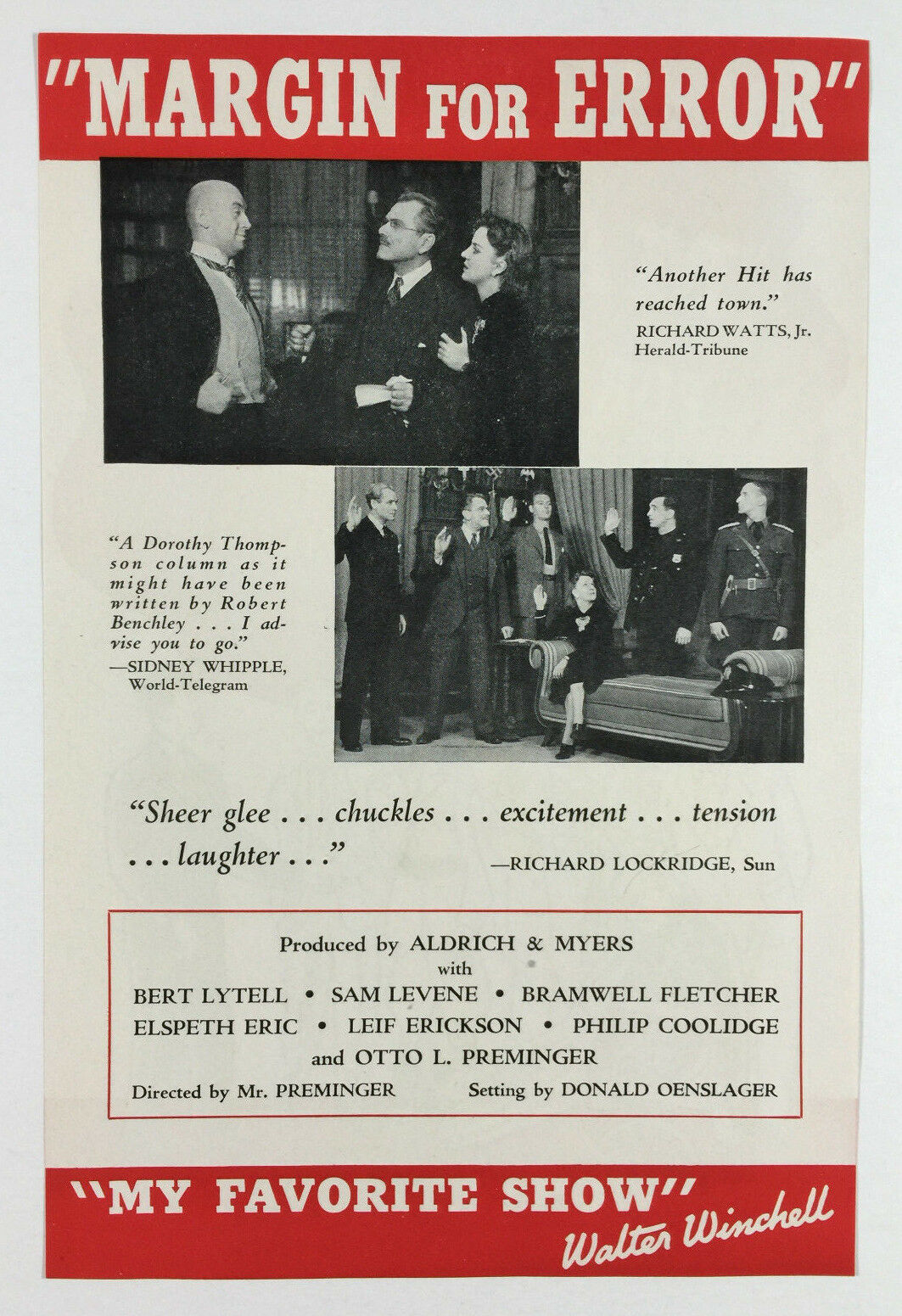
Margin For Error flyer side 2, original Broadway production

== Cast and characters ==
The characters and cast from the Broadway production are given below:

Opening night cast
Character	Broadway cast
Otto B. Horst	Philip Coolidge
Baron Max von Alvenstor	Bramwell Fletcher
Officer Finkelstein	Sam Levene
Frieda	Evelyn Wahle
Dr. Jennings	Bert Lytell
Sophie Baumer	Elspeth Eric
Karl Baumer	Otto Preminger
Thomas S. Denny	Leif Erickson
Captain Mulrooney	Edward J. McNamara

== Adaptations ==
20th Century Fox purchased the screen rights for approximately $25,000 in the spring of 1941. The studio shelved the project for about a year, but William Goetz, serving as interim studio head while Darryl F. Zanuck was fulfilling his military duty, greenlighted the project in April 1942. Ernst Lubitsch was initially assigned to direct. Goetz wanted Preminger to reprise his role of Baumer, but Preminger insisted he wanted to direct as well. Preminger convinced Goetz by offering to direct for free and to withdraw from directing (but remain as Baumer) if Goetz was unhappy with his work at the end of the first week of filming. Preminger hired Samuel Fuller to rewrite the script. The film was released in 1943, with comedian Milton Berle as Finkelstein. Preminger did play Baumer, and Edward McNamara also reprised the role of Mulrooney.
