= Johnny Broderick =

American police detective

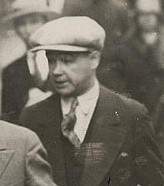
- Broderick in 1927
- Born: January 16, 1896; Gashouse District, Manhattan, New York City
- Died: January 16, 1966 (aged 70); Middletown, New York, US
- Resting place: Long Island National Cemetery, Farmingdale, New York
- Other names: Broadway Johnny, The Boff
- Relatives: Marion McShea (wife), Marion Farinon (daughter)
- Police career
- Department: New York City Police Department (NYPD)
- Service years: 1923–1947
- Rank: 1923: Appointed Patrolman; 1923: Promoted to Detective Third Grade; 1925; Promoted to Detective Second Grade; 1926: Promoted to Detective First Grade; 1934: Demoted to Patrolman; 1934: promoted to Detective Third Grade; 1935: Promoted to Detective Second Grade; 1939: Promoted to Detective First Grade

Johnny Broderick (January 16, 1896 (some sources say 1894, 1895, or 1897) – January 16, 1966) was a New York City Police Department detective who became known in the 1920s and 1930s as one of the city's toughest officers, patrolling the Broadway Theater District and policing strikes as head of the NYPD's Industrial Squad, sometimes personally beating gangsters and suspects.

In his career as a detective between 1923 and 1947, Broderick built a reputation for physical courage, for assaulting gangsters like Jack "Legs" Diamond and "Two-Gun" Crowley, and for facing down armed gunmen in a prison break at The Tombs prison.

Broderick was a "celebrity detective" whose exploits were a favorite of gossip columnists and the press. He and his sometime partner Johnny Cordes were probably the best known officers in the NYPD in the era between the two world wars. A character based on Broderick was the subject of the 1936 film Bullets or Ballots, with the Broderick character played by Edward G. Robinson. He was also portrayed in a comic book about police, and a film, TV series, and Broadway musical based on his life were once contemplated.

Broderick won eight medals for valor during his career, but he was dogged by accusations of excessive force. The Industrial Squad under his command was accused of corruption and brutality toward strikers, with Broderick himself accused of taking bribes, and he once beat a prisoner in his custody so badly that he was permanently crippled. He would sometimes beat up innocent people, and brutality complaints against him were futile. He was finally forced into retirement by Mayor William O'Dwyer for associating with gangsters.

== Early life ==
John Joseph Broderick was born on Manhattan's East 25th Street, in the impoverished Gashouse District, the son of Margaret Kendall and Michael Broderick. At the age of 12 he left parochial school to drive a brick truck, and then a coal truck, to support his mother after the death of his father. He served in the U.S. Navy in World War I and worked as a bodyguard for Samuel Gompers, the labor leader. He joined the New York City Fire Department in April 1922 but found that boring. Having taken both the Fire and Police Department examinations, in January of the following year he joined the New York City Police Department.

In their 2001 book NYPD, James Lardner and Thomas A. Reppetto describe Broderick as a "Gashouse district tough guy" and "former labor slugger".

== Career ==
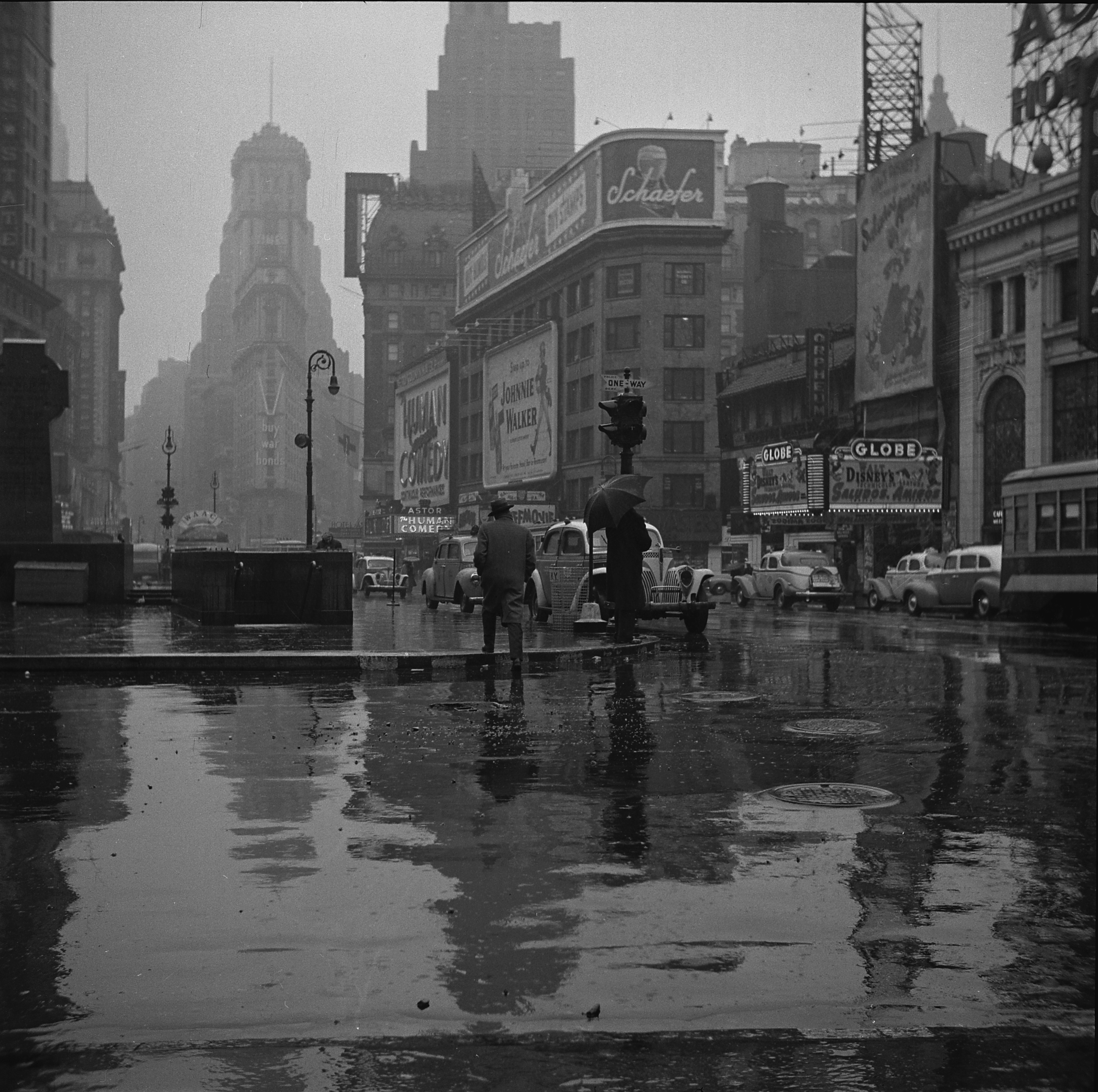
Times Square in 1943, when Johnny Broderick patrolled the area.

Broderick joined the NYPD on January 16, 1923, and he became a detective third grade on April 2 of that year, obtaining in less than four months a promotion that would usually take five years. The New York Herald Tribune called his swift appointment as detective "extraordinary luck or influence or both." He continued to rise rapidly in rank. He was promoted to detective second grade in May 1925 and detective first grade in March 1926. The Daily News reported years later that "no few of Detective Broderick's contemporaries [felt] that he plainly had an angel somewhere in the city." In 1934 it was reported that before joining the police department he was a chauffeur for a coal merchant who was close to chief inspector William J. Lahey, who was believed to be Broderick's sponsor in the department.

Broderick was put in charge of the Industrial Squad, a plainclothes unit was created in 1917 to monitor the labor movement, to keep it free from political radicals, Communists and racketeers, and to suppress violence during strikes. Broderick "had little patience with labor militants," according to one history of the NYPD in that era, and he led the Industrial Squad in violent confrontations with the fur workers' union, which was led by Communists, and railroad workers insurgents in 1926 and 1927. Strikes in the city's Garment District also turned violent, and in August 1925 Broderick's nose was broken when he tried to disperse a crowd of striking garment workers.

In November 1926 the Gangster Squad was absorbed by the Industrial Squad, with Broderick in command. While commander of the Industrial Squad, Broderick received acclaim for his role in quelling an attempted prison break at The Tombs, the Manhattan prison, on November 3, 1926. He faced down two armed convicts, one of them mobster Hyman Amberg, in the Tombs yard after they had already killed two prison officials. Police said that the convicts, who were already wounded, committed suicide as Broderick approached.

He remained in charge of the Gangster and Industrial Squad until 1928, when he received what The New York Times described as "lesser assignments." After Fiorello LaGuardia became mayor in 1934, Broderick and other police officers fell out of favor for connections with the Democratic Tammany Hall political machine. In 1934, by then assigned to the Manhattan District Attorney's office, he was reduced in rank to patrolman, his pay was cut by $1000 and he was transferred to Long Island City by police commissioner John F. O'Ryan. Syndicated columnist Westbrook Pegler said at the time that Broderick "has been busted and sent out to walk a beat because he has enjoyed for some years the endorsement and assistance of some of the most pernicious Tammany politicians in the city. He was reinstated as detective third grade by O'Ryan five months later after meeting with Broderick, saying that the original demotion was a result of "vague criticism regarding their political connections," and that he was viewed by his current commander as a "model cop." He was promoted to detective second grade in 1935 and detective first grade in 1939.

On the Broadway beat, Broderick swiftly gained a reputation for violence. His fists were once described as "huge lethal pistons that could beat a man senseless in half a heartbeat," and to "broderick" became Broadway slang for being knocked out by a single punch. His knuckles were broken many times. Once he knocked out the gangster Francis "Two Gun" Crowley with a single punch, even though Crowley was pointing a gun at him. At the time Crowley was captured by police in May 1931, Broderick attempted to break into the apartment where he was barricaded. He failed and had to be hospitalized. He was said to have demanded that hoodlums tip their hat to him, and once was said to have gone to the funeral of a member of the Hudson Dusters gang and spat in his eye. Broderick would wrap a lead pipe in a newspaper, which allowed him to beat gangsters while it looked like he was giving them a friendly swat with a rolled-up newspaper.

Broderick's exploits were widely reported in the New York media, gaining him celebrity status. His tenth anniversary on the police department was commemorated by a dinner in his honor in January 1933 at the Della Robbia Room of the Vanderbilt Hotel, attended by politicians and civic leaders including Tammany Hall district leader James J. Hines. Entertainment was provided, gratis, by Bill Robinson, Bert Lahr and Harry Richman. Hines was subsequently convicted of racketeering for protecting Harlem numbers rackets run by Dutch Schultz.

Broderick's exploits were a mainstay of the New York newspapers. He tossed hoodlums who had been bothering women through a plate-glass window, one by one, and then arrested them for malicious destruction of property, for which they were sentenced to 30 days in jail. He also disarmed a man who was robbing a crowded restaurant at Columbus Circle with two guns and a knife. He once reputedly responded to a threat from gangster Legs Diamond by emptying a trash bin over his head, and forced him to crawl away. Other accounts of the confrontation hold that Broderick dumped Diamond in the trash bin head-first, while others say that Broderick knocked out Diamond with a single blow, with one account claiming that Diamond was left unconscious for 20 minutes. Broderick's reputation for toughness was such that Jack Dempsey, the heavyweight boxing champion, once said of Broderick that "He's the only I wouldn't want to meet in a fight outside the ring and its rules."

He would offer himself as an informal protection service for crime victims, especially young women, and personally beat up offenders.

Broderick worked often with Johnny Cordes, a two-time winner of the department's medal of honor, and Barney Ruditsky, whose exploits inspired the 1959 TV series The Lawless Years.

Broderick was often selected as a bodyguard for visiting celebrities. President Franklin D. Roosevelt requested that Broderick be his special bodyguard when he visited New York for the 1936 World Series, and he also was bodyguard for Queen Marie of Romania and King Albert of Belgium.

== Allegations of misconduct ==
Throughout his career, beginning with his days in the Industrial Squad, Broderick was a subject of allegations of misconduct, and the Industrial Squad under his command was accused of violence toward strikers and corruption. He sometimes beat up people who were totally innocent, and lawsuits and complaints of brutality were futile because of his public image, honed by favorable media coverage, and connections.

Reporting on Broderick's brief demotion to patrolman in 1934, columnist Westbrook Pegler said that the demotion would do him some good, that he "was excessively tough at times and there were occasions when, pining for action, he bounced around people who were in not particular need of bouncing around." Pegler said that Broderick was selective in whom he would harass, that "there were many low characters in the city, notorious for their activity in the rackets, who were walking right past Detective Broderick on the street and in the lobby of [Madison Square] Garden, whom he did not find any occasion to bounce around." Pegler said he found that "strange."

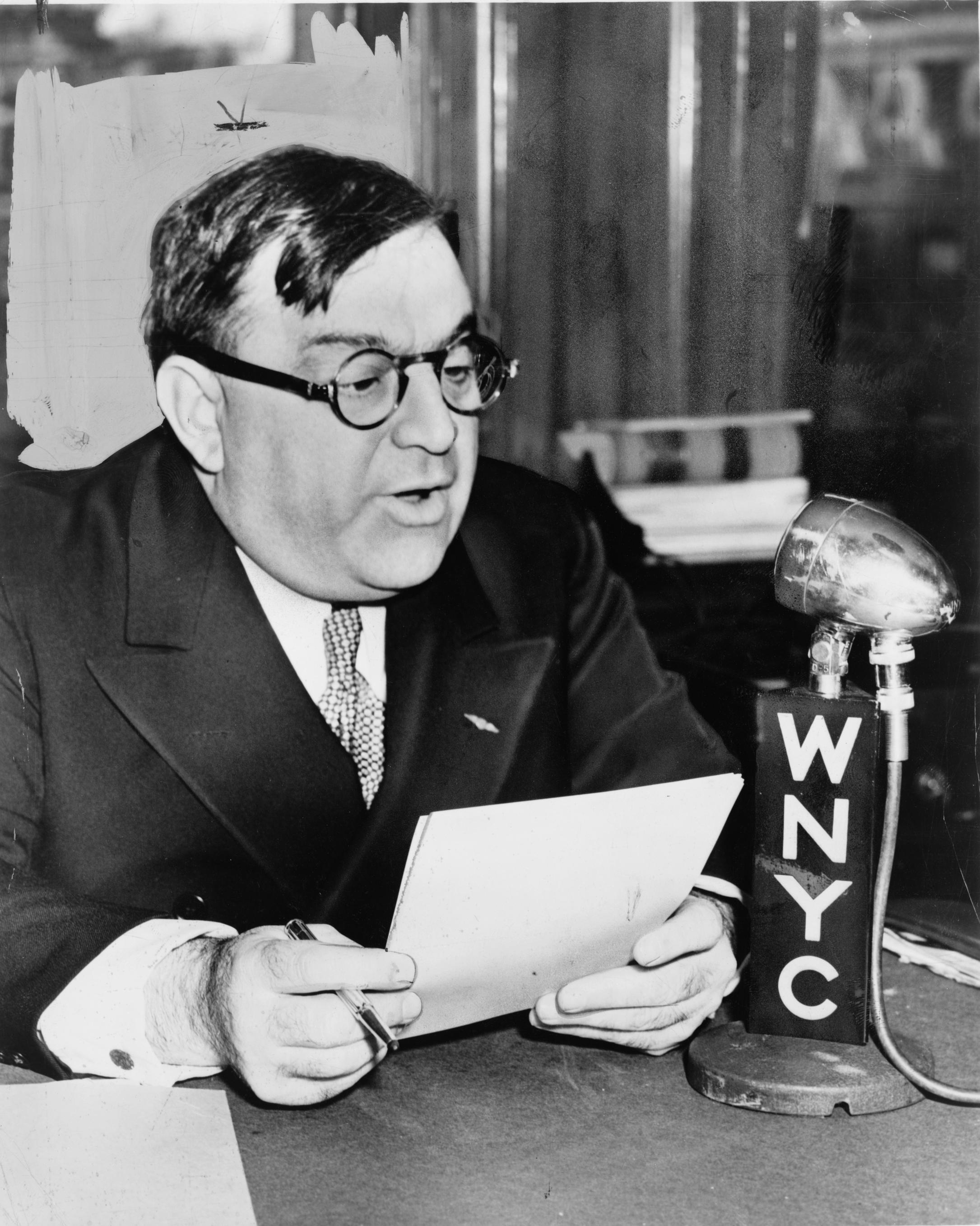
Fiorello LaGuardia accused the Industrial Squad of extorting payoffs from labor and management

In July 1926, Broderick and the Industrial Squad were accused by the American Civil Liberties Union of clubbing and beating striking Interborough Rapid Transit Company workers, injuring 20. Broderick denied the charges, saying the police were acting in self-defense. The squad was accused by the Teamsters Union of beating striking drivers, and it was accused of brutality against striking paper-box makers in 1926. The following year, Broderick's squad was accused of attacking fur industry strikers. In 1928, Broderick and officers from his squad were accused of beating two spectators at a Madison Square Garden bicycle race, sending them to the hospital with broken jaws and internal injuries. In this incident Broderick's career was rescued by favorable press coverage.

In 1927, a furrier's union official, Isidor Shapiro, told a special committee of the American Federation of Labor that his union paid the police $3800 a week in bribes for protection during a 1926 strike. Union officials claimed that non-union workers were beaten while police officers "stood idly by." Shapiro claimed that the "Industrial Squad chief" was paid $100 a week and that ten men in the squad were paid $50 a week. Broderick and the other officers were cleared after an inquiry by a judge. The charges were revived in 1939, when a former Communist, Maurice L. Malkin, accused Broderick and other officers of corruption in testimony before the House Un-American Activities Committee. Malkin testified that the furriers union, which was controlled by Communists in the 1920s, borrowed $1.75 million from racketeer Arnold Rothstein to finance the 1926 strike, and that $110,000 of that went to Broderick and other members of the Industrial Squad, including Barney Ruditsky. The amount that Broderick received was said to be $45,000 and $50,000. No action was taken against Broderick or the other detectives.

As a mayoral candidate in 1929, Fiorello LaGuardia accused the Industrial Squad of extorting payoffs from labor and management, and that "instead of preserving order, this agency has done more to create disorder than anything else." The squad was disbanded in 1933.

In 1937, a justice of the New York State Supreme Court freed a prisoner who had been arrested for parole violation and beaten by Broderick, saying that "the police of the City of New York beat him so badly that he will be a cripple for life. I think this man has more than expiated his crime." The prisoner sustained fractures to the knee and ribs, his jaw was dislocated, and he was not given medical attention while in police custody. Broderick's superiors found no reason to discipline the detective.

== Retirement controversy ==
In September 1946, Broderick was assigned to the office of Mayor William O'Dwyer in an unannounced confidential capacity, a move that many in city government found surprising. After a few months he was abruptly transferred to the Main Office Division, and in July 1947, he retired from the police department.

In 1949, he sought to become a Democratic leader in the Broadway district on Manhattan's west side. One of the two incumbent district leaders Broderick was challenging, Gerald V. Murphy, accused him of having been forced out of the department for associating with gangsters. The charge was confirmed by Manhattan's District Attorney, Frank Hogan, who disclosed that Broderick was forced to retire by Mayor William O'Dwyer after Hogan's office learned that in November 1946 he had accompanied a gambler and ex-convict, Ben Kaye, to Hot Springs, Arkansas, where he "associated with" mobster Owney Madden. Broderick denied the charge, conceding that he was on the same plane as Kaye but that it was a "coincidence." He admitted that he knew Madden and "every gangster in New York. That was my job." His bid to become a district leader failed in the September 1949 primary elections.

In an editorial, the New York Herald Tribune pointed out that the circumstances of Broderick's forced retirement only came to light because he was seeking a new career in politics, and that "voters may wonder how much they are really told about city government, when the Broderick incident demonstrates how discreetly a little embarrassment can be obliterated."

== Personal life ==
In 1931 Broderick was 5 feet 10 inches tall, weighed 170 pounds, and "dresses like Beau Brummel." He neither smoked nor drank, worked out at a gymnasium every day, and kept in top physical condition.

At the time of his demotion in 1934 he was described as having an affluent lifestyle. Though drawing a salary of $4,000 a year, cut to $3,000 as a result of the demotion, he drove a Cadillac, dressed expensively and owned a home in Jackson Heights, Queens.

Broderick was a devoted prizefighting fan, rarely missing a fight at Madison Square Garden. During his days as a detective, Broderick enjoyed listening to his wife play the piano and was described by his New York Times obituary as fond of "monogrammed, cream-colored silk underwear" and that off-duty he was "the gentlest of men." He was said to be upset by his portrayal by Robinson in Bullets or Ballots because Robinson was shown drinking and smoking.

After his retirement he sold his life story to RKO Pictures for $75,000, to be made into a motion picture titled "Broadway's One-Man Riot Squad." A 1948 report said that the screenplay was to be by Herman J. Mankiewicz, who knew Broderick from his days as a newspaper reporter. The film, which was to star Robert Ryan, was never made, and plans to have a television series or musical made about his life persisted through 1959, but did not come to pass.

He died of heart disease on his birthday at his farmhouse outside Middletown, New York, where he raised horses and dogs. He was survived by his wife, the former Marion McShea, his daughter, Marion Farinon, three sisters and nine grandchildren. He was buried in Pine Lawn Cemetery in Massapequa, Long Island. In 1933 it was reported that he had been married for 14 years at the time, and that he had two daughters, Margaret and Marion.

== Legacy ==
The brutal methods used by Broderick and other officers were sanctioned by the police department during their era and praised as "fearless." Beginning in the 1960s, however, New York police sought to curb that kind of conduct. Training programs were established teaching officers to observe the civil rights of suspects and the public. By the 1980s, it was feared that the pendulum had shifted back toward brutality, as complaints of assaults by police climbed. Broderick was cited by The New York Times in 1985 as an exemplar of the old methods of policing.

At the time of his death in 1966, Walter Henning, an assistant chief inspector and a colleague of Broderick's, called him a "man of his time," and said that "under restrictions today, he'd have a difficult time doing the things he did." But during Prohibition, he said, "when these people [gangsters] went in and out of court it was like a revolving door, they had rather be locked up than to meet Johnny."

In his 2011 book American Police a History, 1845–1945, Thomas A. Reppetto, a former Chicago detective commander and ex-president of the Citizens Crime Commission of New York City, said that despite his fearsome reputation Broderick was actually beaten up on several occasions. Broderick's image, he says, "rested to a great extent that Broadway show business figures relied upon him for informal protection," as well as on "rave accounts" of his career by Ed Sullivan, Gene Fowler, Toots Shor and others.

The story "He Lived with Danger" in the issue #26 of All True Crime comic book series is dedicated to Detective Broderick.

Reppetto observed that the "real strength" of Broderick and Cordes was that they "had what the gangster did not, the legal right to use deadly force and the practical power to slug hoods on sight."
