= Max Finkelstein =

American police officer

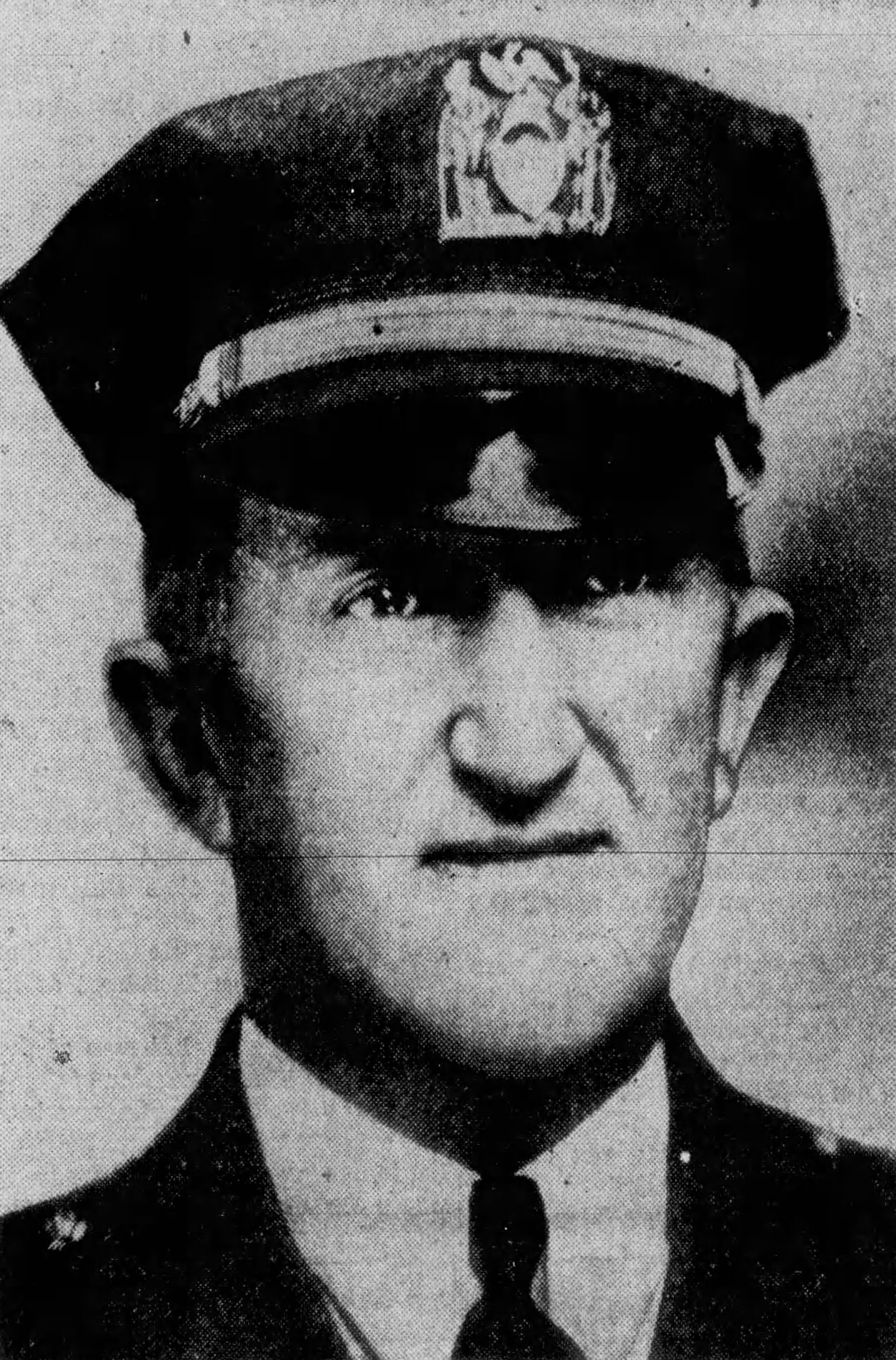
- Finkelstein c. 1940
- Born: March 5, 1884; Russian Empire
- Died: May 3, 1940 (aged 56); East Flatbush, Brooklyn, New York, U.S.
- Resting place: Montefiore Cemetery
- Police career
- Department: New York City Police Department (NYPD)
- Service years: May 29, 1911 – May 3, 1940
- Rank: Captain

Max Finkelstein (March 5, 1884 – May 3, 1940) was a captain in the New York City Police Department.

== Police career ==
As president of Shomrim, a fraternal order of Jewish New York City police officers, he became famous in 1938 when Fiorello H. La Guardia picked him to lead a special squad whose job was to safeguard visiting officials from Nazi Germany and guard the German consulate. A popular belief was that La Guardia's decision to appoint Finkelstein and the other Jewish officers was inspired by actions taken by Theodore Roosevelt, when he was New York City Police Commissioner, who assigned 40 Jewish police officers to protect, and make look "ridiculous", Hermann Ahlwardt, when he gave an anti-semitic speech in New York. While a popular story published by the Times during a later period of anti-Nazism, this story is not supported by news articles of the time and in fact the names of officers printed during Ahlwardt's 1895 visit are Anglo or Irish names, such as Cartright and O'Brien, not generally used by Jews.

The Nazis reacted to Finkelstein's appointment with anger. A photo of Finkelstein appeared on the front page of the Nazi newspaper Der Angriff, which decried the choice of Finkelstein and the other Jewish officers as a "provocation" and wondered how Americans would react if their diplomats in Germany were placed under the protection of black policemen.

== Death ==
In 1940, after 29 "spotless" years with the New York City police, Finkelstein requested retirement. However, after being told "that he would be required to face charges of accepting irregular bail bonds", he committed suicide.

The New York Times reported that 10,000 people "thronged the neighborhood" during Finkelstein's funeral. Finkelstein was interred in Montefiore Cemetery in Queens.

== Depicted on stage and screen ==
Finkelstein's experience guarding Nazi diplomats in New York served as the basis for a character in the 1939 Broadway play Margin for Error by Clare Boothe Luce. The play was made into a film of the same name in 1943. The film was directed by Otto Preminger and the Finkelstein character was played by Milton Berle.
