= Margin for Error =

1943 film by Otto Preminger

- US Theatrical Poster
- Directed by: Otto Preminger
- Written by: Lillie Hayward; Samuel Fuller
- Based on: Margin for Error by Clare Boothe Luce
- Produced by: Ralph Dietrich
- Starring: Joan Bennett; Milton Berle; Otto Preminger
- Cinematography: Edward Cronjager
- Edited by: Louis R. Loeffler
- Music by: Leigh Harline
- Distributed by: 20th Century Fox
- Release date: February 10, 1943
- Running time: 74 minutes
- Country: United States
- Language: English

Margin for Error is a 1943 American drama film directed by Otto Preminger. The screenplay by Lillie Hayward and Samuel Fuller is based on the 1939 play of the same title by Clare Boothe Luce.

== Plot ==
When police officer Moe Finkelstein and his colleague Officer Salomon are ordered to serve as bodyguards to German consul Karl Baumer by the mayor of New York City, Finkelstein turns in his badge, convinced he has to quit the service because the man is a Nazi. Capt. Mulrooney, who appointed them to this job, tells Moe that although the mayor personally is opposed to Adolf Hitler and his regime, the mayor is responsible for the safety of everybody, and he believes that through this assignment Finkelstein can show them the difference between their system and the Nazi one.

Moe quickly discovers Baumer is in trouble with Berlin for having squandered money intended to finance sabotage. His secretary, Baron Max von Alvenstor, has become disenchanted with his boss and refuses to delay the delivery of a damaging financial report to Berlin. Baumer's Czechoslovak wife, Sophia, confesses to Moe that she loathes her husband and married him only to secure her father's release from prison. Also at odds with Baumer is Otto Horst, who has been ordered to procure false identification cards for German saboteurs assigned to blow up an American port at the end of a radio broadcast delivered by Hitler.

Under orders from Berlin to dispense with Horst, Baumer plots to frame Max for the man's murder and tries to enlist Sophia's help, but she warns Horst of the scheme, so he begins to carry a gun for protection. While the Baumers are listening to the radio speech with their guests (Horst, Max, and Dr. Jennings), Horst stabs the Consul with his new knife without the others' noticing it. Then Sophia grabs Horst's gun and kills Baumer. Max urges Sophia to escape before anyone sees her.

Moe discovers the body and begins to question suspects, including Sophia, who readily confesses to the crime, but Max insists it was he who killed Baumer. Moe reveals Baumer not only was shot but was stabbed and poisoned as well. Meanwhile, Max rushes to the port where the saboteurs are concealed and orders them to dismantle the bomb. With only minutes to spare, the bomb is dismantled and the saboteurs are captured. Returning to the consulate, Max identifies Horst as an accomplice to the saboteurs, and Horst is arrested.

A coroner's report determines Baumer died of poisoning. Reconstructing the event, they discover that he put the poison in the whisky glass for Max, but when something hit the window during the demonstration outside, the whisky glass intended for Max was confused with the consul's own brandy glass, so Baumer mistakenly drank from the glass he meant for Max.

== Cast ==
- Edward McNamara as Police Capt. Mulrooney (uncredited)
- Milton Berle as Officer Moe Finkelstein
- Joe Kirk as Officer Solomon
- Joan Bennett as Sophia Baumer (Wife of General Consul of Germany)
- Otto Preminger as Karl Baumer (General Consul of Germany)
- Carl Esmond as Baron Max von Alvenstor (Secretary to the Consul)
- Howard Freeman as Otto Horst (the American Führer)
- Clyde Fillmore as Dr. Jennings
- Poldi Dur as Frieda (as Poldy Dur) personal maid
- Hans Heinrich von Twardowski as Fritz, Butler (uncredited)
- Ludwig Donath as Hitler's Voice (as Louis Donath)
- Ferike Boros as Mrs. Finkelstein (uncredited)
- Ralph Byrd as Pete, the Dice-Playing Soldier (uncredited)
- Don Dillaway as Reporter (uncredited)
- Eddie Dunn as Desk Sergeant (uncredited)
- Byron Foulger as Drug Store Clerk (uncredited)
- Selmer Jackson as Coroner (uncredited)
- Bert Moorhouse as Roulette Croupier (uncredited)
- Allan Nixon as Soldier (uncredited)
- Ted North as Saboteur (uncredited)
- Cyril Ring as Drugstore Clerk (uncredited)
- Barney Ruditsky as Policeman (uncredited)
- Hans Schumm as Karl Müller (uncredited)
- Emmett Vogan as Fingerprint Expert (uncredited)
- Wolfgang Zilzer in a bit part (uncredited)

== Sources ==
The play Margin for Error was based on an incident that occurred in 1938, when New York Mayor Fiorello La Guardia appointed Police Captain Max Finkelstein to head a special squad of Jewish officers tasked with protecting the German consulate in the city from protestors. The police officer character's name was originally Max Finkelstein but was changed to Moe Finkelstein after the real Finkelstein's suicide in May 1940.

== Production ==
Otto Preminger had directed and starred as Baumer in the Broadway production of Claire Booth Luce's play, which opened on November 3, 1939, at the Plymouth Theatre, where it ran for 264 performances, and he reprised the role for a national tour in the summer of 1940.

According to the New York Times, 20th Century Fox purchased the screen rights for $25,000 in the spring of 1941 but temporarily shelved the property because studio executives felt Boothe's "statement of the opposition between fascism and democracy had become self-evident to the point of banality." In April 1942, William Goetz, serving as interim studio head while Darryl F. Zanuck was fulfilling his military duty, greenlighted the project and assigned it to director Ernst Lubitsch. Originally Austrian actor Rudolf Forster was cast as Baumer but he returned to Germany leaving a note "I'm leaving to join Adolf (Hitler)". Goetz wanted Preminger to reprise the role, but Preminger insisted he wanted to direct as well. When Goetz refused, Preminger offered to direct for free and agreed to withdraw from helming the film but remain as Baumer if Goetz was unhappy with his work at the end of the first week of filming, and Goetz agreed.

Preminger thought the screenplay by Lillie Hayward was "awful" and hired newcomer Samuel Fuller, on leave from the United States Army, to help him revise the script. The men agreed Luce's original play, written as a call to arms, had to become a morale booster for a country firmly entrenched in World War II. As such, they presented the story as a flashback to the period prior to America's entry in the war. Principal photography began on September 28, 1942, and at the end of the first week, Goetz told the director he was so pleased with the dailies he was offering him a seven-year contract as director and actor. Preminger requested producing rights as well, and the deal was sealed. He completed filming on November 5, on schedule and only slightly over budget.

== Critical reception ==
Theodore Strauss of The New York Times observed, "Less than brilliant when done on Broadway, the script is now painfully dated. The Nazis certainly are not less villainous, but as they are shown in the film they are much less interesting. Practically every character and situation has long been a cliché of anti-Nazi films generally... There are other examples of worn conventions. Margin for Error tells us nothing new and tells it very dully... As a story the film has practically no suspense. It is not greatly helped by the tediously bombastic style of Otto Preminger as the consul nor by Joan Bennett as his suffering wife. Poor Milton Berle... is forced to forsake his comic antics and make sweet speeches on the benefits of democracy, a role for which Mr. Berle seems way out of line. For that matter, Margin for Error is way out of line as well."

Alexander Larman of Channel 4 rated the film three out of five stars and noted, "Otto Preminger is rightly regarded as one of the most talented émigré directors to have had a successful career in post-war American film. However, Margin For Error, while undeniably entertaining in a B-movie manner, is hardly indicative of his talent, suffering from a plot that alternates between cliche and head-scratching reversals, some unimpressive acting and a limp denouement."
