= Bullets or Ballots =

1936 gangster film by William Keighley

- Theatrical release poster
- Directed by: William Keighley
- Written by: Seton I. Miller; Martin Mooney
- Produced by: Louis F. Edelman (uncredited)
- Starring: Edward G. Robinson; Joan Blondell; Barton MacLane; Humphrey Bogart; Frank McHugh
- Cinematography: Hal Mohr
- Edited by: Jack Killifer
- Music by: Bernhard Kaun
- Production company: First National Pictures
- Distributed by: Warner Bros. Pictures
- Release date: June 6, 1936
- Running time: 82 minutes
- Country: United States
- Language: English

Bullets or Ballots is a 1936 American crime thriller film starring Edward G. Robinson, Joan Blondell, Barton MacLane, and Humphrey Bogart. Robinson plays a police detective who infiltrates a crime gang. This is the first of several films featuring both Robinson and Bogart.

Robinson's character, Johnny Blake, was based on Johnny Broderick, a New York City detective.

Louise Beavers' character is based on Harlem numbers queen Stephanie St. Clair.

== Plot ==
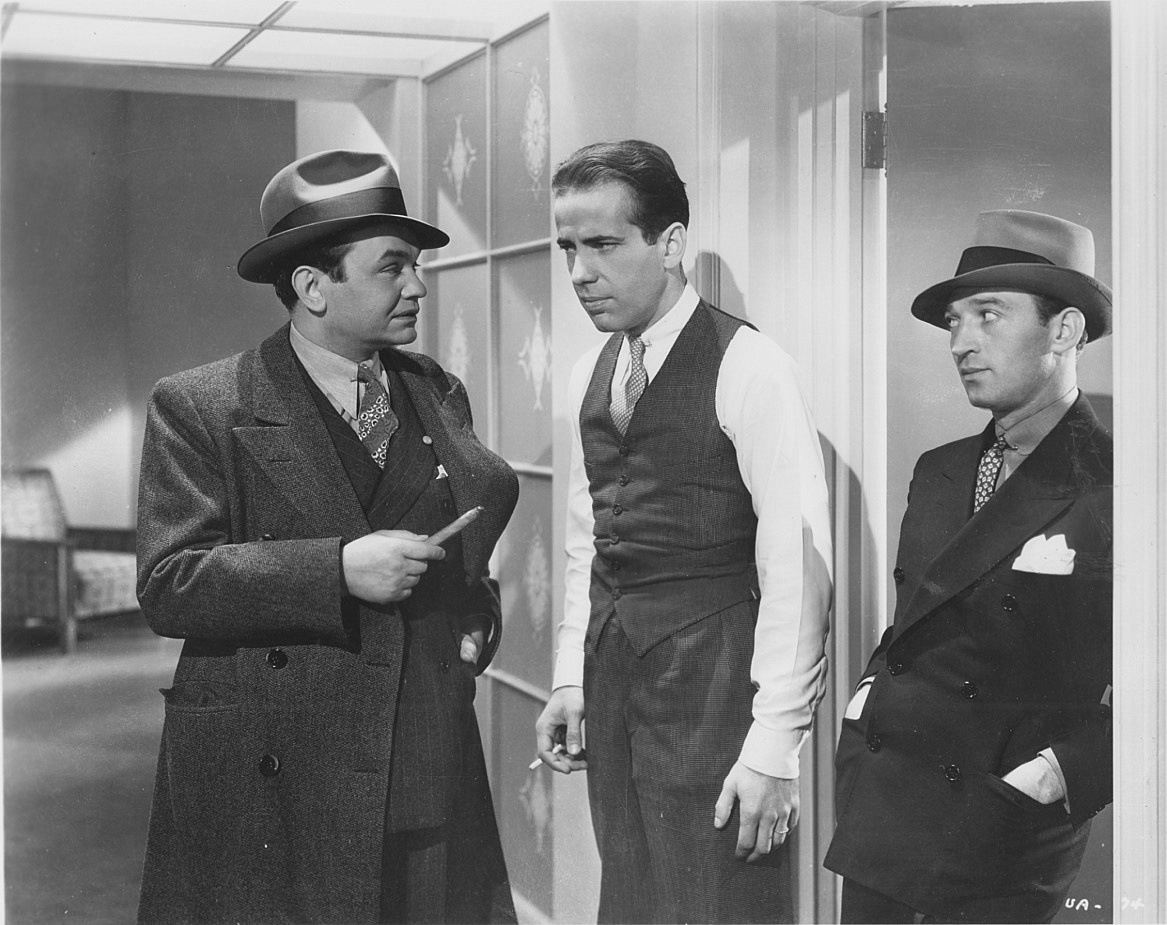
Edward G. Robinson, Humphrey Bogart and George E. Stone in Bullets or Ballots

Detective Johnny Blake is a New York City cop who has made his reputation by cracking down on racketeers. When Blake gets kicked off the force, a powerful crime boss named Al Kruger hires him in an attempt to gain fresh ideas about sidestepping the law and expanding his criminal empire. Masterminding the mob are three very powerful bankers, who are only known by the crime boss. Blake soon gains Kruger's trust and rises through the ranks of the criminal organization, much to the distaste of Bugs Fenner, who believes Blake to be a police informer.

To compensate for a reduction in the mob's revenue, Blake suggests to Kruger that they go into the numbers racket, currently run on a small scale by Blake's girlfriend, Lee Morgan. Kruger follows Blake's proposal, and the mob's money flow is so great that Kruger ignores the other rackets. In reality, Blake is cooperating with Captain Dan McLaren in order to find the leaders of the crime ring. With Blake's information, the police engage in a series of raids on the crime syndicate's operations. Fenner, unhappy with the focus of the rackets, kills Kruger in an attempt to take over as the head of the mob. But Blake has already been granted the title as boss by the leaders, and he takes over control, meeting up with the three bankers.

When Fenner's produce racket gets raided by the police and Blake is seen as the fingerman by a spotter, Fenner attempts to kill Blake, while he waits to deliver money to the bankers. During a gun battle, Fenner is killed and Blake is mortally wounded. He is able to arrive at the bank, leading McLaren to the bankers, who are subsequently arrested.

== Cast ==
The cast of Bullets or Ballots is recorded in Bogey—The Films of Humphrey Bogart.

- Edward G. Robinson as Detective Johnny Blake
- Joan Blondell as Lee Morgan
- Barton MacLane as Al Kruger
- Humphrey Bogart as Nick "Bugs" Fenner
- Frank McHugh as Herman McCloskey
- Joe King as Captain Dan "Mac" McLaren (credited as Joseph King)
- Dick Purcell as Ed Driscoll (credited as Richard Purcell)
- George E. Stone as Wires Kagel
- Joseph Crehan as Grand Jury Spokesman
- Henry O'Neill as Ward Bryant
- Henry Kolker as Mr. Hollister
- Gilbert Emery as Mr. Thorndyke
- Herbert Rawlinson as Mr. Caldwell
- Louise Beavers as Nellie LaFleur (based on Stephanie St Clair, Harlem numbers queen)
- Norman Willis as Louie Vinci

Uncredited

- William Pawley as Crail
- Ralph Remley as Kelly
- Frank Faylen as Gatley - pinball racketeer
- Garry Owen as The Spotter
- Edna Mae Harris as Lee's maid

== Production ==
Edward G. Robinson and Humphrey Bogart went on to make four more films together: Kid Galahad (1937) with Bette Davis and Harry Carey, The Amazing Dr. Clitterhouse (1938), Brother Orchid (1940) with Ralph Bellamy and Key Largo (1948) with Lauren Bacall, Claire Trevor and Lionel Barrymore.

== Reception ==
Writing for The Spectator in 1936, Graham Greene described the film as "a good gangster film of the second class", and praising actor Robinson as having given "a reliable performance".

== Adaptations to other media ==
Bullets or Ballots was adapted as a one-hour radio play on the April 17, 1939, broadcast of Lux Radio Theater with Edward G. Robinson, Mary Astor, and Humphrey Bogart.
