= Barney Ruditsky =

British-born American police officer and private detective

Barnett P. Ruditsky
- Born: December 25, 1898; London, England, UK
- Died: October 18, 1962 (aged 63); Los Angeles, California, USA
- Resting place: Hillside Memorial Park
- Other name: Barney
- Spouses: Mollie Feiner (m. 1923) Reggie Darryl (before 1957)
- Relatives: Martin Phillips (son)
- Police career
- Department: New York City Police Department (NYPD)
- Service years: 1921 - October 19, 1941
- Rank: 1921 - Commissioned as a Patrolman; 1924 - Promoted to Detective
- Badge no.: 5647 (officer)
- Awards: NYPD Combat Cross
- Other work: Private detective, nightclub owner, technical advisor for film and television

Barnett "Barney" P. Ruditsky (December 25, 1898 – October 18, 1962) was a British-born American police officer and private detective.

During his 20-year career on the force Ruditsky was among the NYPD's prominent "celebrity detectives" of the 1920s and 1930s. Ruditsky was associated with many criminal cases during this period, most notably, ending with the break-up of Murder Incorporated in 1940. Years later, he was called to testify before the Kefauver hearings due to his knowledge of the criminal underworld in Southern California and Las Vegas.

He later worked as a private investigator in California, and also served as a technical advisor on a series of crime films for 20th Century Fox in the mid-1940s and The Lawless Years, a television series loosely based on his career.

== Early life ==
Barnett P. Ruditsky was born in London, England on December 25, 1898. He was the son of Blooma (née Marin) and Phillip Ruditsky, a boot finisher. His family lived in South Africa for a time before returning to England. He was Jewish.

In 1908, the Ruditsky family emigrated to the United States and settled on the East Side of Manhattan. At the age of 18, Ruditsky enlisted in the United States Army and saw active service during the 1916 U.S. expedition into Mexico and on the Western Front during the First World War.

== Career in the NYPD ==
Upon his return from France, Ruditsky joined New York City Police Department (NYPD), officially becoming a patrolman in 1921. The young officer soon made a name for himself when, in August 1923, he subdued a much larger man using his nightstick and was praised by both Magistrate Henry M. R. Goodman and The New York Times for the arrest. Ruditsky was made a detective the following year in the gangster-industrial squad, headed by Detective Johnny Broderick. The two men would eventually become one of the Broadway Squad's leading detectives during Prohibition.

On the night of February 21, 1926, he and his wife Mollie stopped the robbery of a confectionery store near their home on Pennsylvania Avenue in Brooklyn. The two were returning from celebrating their wedding anniversary at a theatre and supper club when they noticed the hold-up taking place. Ruditsky managed to overpower one of the robbers, took his gun, and handed it to his wife while he chased down the second robber. Mollie held the first robber at bay while Ruditsky apprehended his accomplice a block and a half away. He then took both men to the nearby Brownsville Police Station. Six months after this incident Ruditsky was promoted to second-grade detective.

In 1928, Ruditsky and fellow detective Harry Hagen disguised themselves as customers in a Turkish bathhouse on Second Street, a known underworld hangout, where they successfully captured the notorious "Poison Ivy" gang. Similarly, he arrested members of the "Pearl Buttons" of West Side Manhattan. It was these cases which first gained Ruditsky fame as a detective.

By the end of the decade Ruditsky and other detectives had earned a sort of celebrity status as "tough-fisted cops", described by The New York Times as "slight of build, but utterly fearless, who, together or separately, battled and beat many an oversized gangster". The exploits of the Ruditsky, Broderick and other detectives were frequently featured in crime magazines and newspapers as they took on such underworld figures as Jack "Legs" Diamond and Dutch Schultz. Ruditsky himself personally arrested Benjamin "Bugsy" Siegel and Abe "Kid Twist" Reles at various points in his career and investigated Louis Buchalter's infamous "Murder, Inc." during the 1930s. Years later, Ruditsky told Senator Estes Kefauver at the hearings on organized crime that he had been "threatened a thousand times ... but I got around them pretty good; nobody got back at me."

Ruditsky was among the 300-man police squad called into action when 2,000 Communist protesters threatened New York City Hall on January 30, 1931. It was the largest force ever assembled to protect City Hall. When the protesters began attack the police, several officers were isolated by the mob and beaten, Ruditsky being among them until he was saved by a fellow officer. In November 1935, Ruditsky was involved in the pursuit of three hold-up men who had robbed nightclub entertainer Frances Faye and her escort Joseph Eichenbaum. The high speed chase began after he commandeered a car and, with detective Thomas Aulbach, followed them until the would-be thieves crashed their car into an elevated pillar at Ninth Avenue and 63rd Street. He chased one of the men on foot and captured him following a shootout. He was presented with the NYPD Combat Cross, the NYPD's second-highest honor, for his actions.

Ruditsky was also assigned to crowd control for the police guarding child star Shirley Temple during her 1938 visit to New York City; the two met again in Hollywood ten years later, when Ruditsky offered to take the young woman along for the police raid that saw actor Robert Mitchum arrested in a "marijuana bust". Temple was tempted but declined the offer. One celebrity with whom he enjoyed a close friendship was musician and big band leader Charlie Barnet. In his autobiography, Those Swinging Years (1992), Barnet described a road trip with Ruditsky:

One of my good friends in New York was Barney Ruditsky, a tough detective. He had participated in the arrest of Louis Lepke, a mobster who had eluded the law for a long time. He and Lepke had grown up together and Barney didn't want to testify against him. While the district attorney was trying to find him to serve a subpoena, he was riding around the country with us in the band bus, the last place anybody would think to look for him.

One night we played a black dance in Washington, D.C. It was in the basement of a building called, I think, The Colonnades. Lena Horne's father was visiting us. Ted Horne was an important gambler from Pittsburgh, where he was the king of Wylie Avenue in the black district. He had a couple of his boys with him when a fight broke out. The cops were outside and afraid to come in. Barney Ruditsky broke off the leg of a chair and with Ted's guys valiantly defended the bandstand while the people sought refuge wherever they could. We finally broke down a door into a back alley and made our way to safety. It was a hell of a brawl, and we were lucky that Ted, his boys, and Barney were there.

Barney also came in handy once when guys in the band and I took three ladies of the evening out of a house in Youngstown on the road with us. Their pimps followed us all the way to Chattanooga, but Barney repulsed them without the beef that would surely have occurred otherwise. Youngstown always seemed a source of trouble.

In 1939, Ruditsky was enmeshed in a bribery scandal stemming from his earlier work in the Industrial Squad, which disbanded in 1933. A former Communist, Maurice L. Malkin, accused Ruditsky, Broderick and other officers of corruption in testimony before the House Un-American Activities Committee. Malkin testified that the furriers union, which was controlled by Communists, borrowed $1.75 million from racketeer Arnold Rothstein to finance a 1926 strike, and that $110,000 of that went to members of the Industrial Squad, including Ruditsky. No action was taken against the officers. Similar charges had been made in 1927 by the American Federation of Labor, and the officers were exonerated.

== Private Eye in Hollywood ==
On October 19, 1941, after twenty years with the NYPD, Ruditsky retired from the force. Shortly after the US entered the Second World War less than two months later, he reenlisted in the United States Army. He was sent to the North African theatre and served as a guard for prisoners of war until being wounded by shrapnel in 1943. While in the military, Ruditsky completed his memoirs, largely about his career in the NYPD, entitled Angel's Corner.

At the end of the war, Ruditsky moved out to Los Angeles, where he opened a private detective firm and a small liquor store and became co-owner of a Sunset Strip nightclub called Sherry's. He was also employed by 20th Century Fox as a technical advisor (and occasional actor) on a series of crime films during the mid-1940s; these included "film noirs" such as Otto Brower's Margin for Error (1943) and Behind Green Lights (1946), and Edwin L. Marin's Nocturne (1946); Ruditsky also spearheaded a Hollywood-based organization to "take the kids off the streets" in an effort to discourage juvenile delinquency. His business ventures brought him into contact with figures in the entertainment industry, law enforcement, and organized crime.

=== Association with gangland figures ===
Despite his reputation in the NYPD, Ruditsky had a poor relationship with the Los Angeles Police Department. The LAPD claimed that his detective agency, the Associated Security Council, collected on bad gambling debts owed to various Las Vegas casinos such as The El Rancho and the Nevada Biltmore; among his clients was one-time nemesis Bugsy Siegel, who now owned the Flamingo and allegedly discussed the underworld financing of the casino with Ruditsky. When Siegel was murdered in 1947, Ruditsky offered his theories to Los Angeles detectives regarding the gangland slaying; a state report by the "Special Crime Study Commission on Organized Crime" stated that Ruditsky was at the crime scene even before police arrived. The details of this meeting were subsequently leaked to syndicated columnist Westbrook Pegler, who exposed Ruditsky's relationship with Siegel, and his image as "a squeaky clean New York cop" was called into question. Ruditsky's nightclub, according to the LAPD, was also a popular hangout for local underworld figures. On at least one occasion he contacted New York mobster Frank Costello, known as "Prime Minister of the Underworld", to assist him in getting a certain type of liquor for his club. Ruditsky routinely checked the street and parking lot for the safety of patrons. In July 1949, Mickey Cohen, a regular at Sherry's, was attacked outside the club and shot in the shoulder in an attempted mob hit. In the aftermath of the attack Ruditsky assisted crime reporter Florabel Muir in searching the area, where they discovered "spent shells and half-eaten sardine sandwiches" on a nearby flight of cement stairs. The next year, Ruditsky was called to testify before the televised Kefauver hearings to discuss his knowledge of organized crime. He specifically shared details about Mickey Cohen and Bugsy Siegel, and described the erratic behavior of Virginia Hill, calling her "psychopathic"; however, he distanced himself from suggestions that he had "improper ties" with the local underworld.

=== Marilyn Monroe and the Wrong Door Raid ===
Though it enjoyed the status of being "Hollywood's most popular detective agency", Ruditsky's firm continued to be linked to questionable activities. In 1954, baseball player Joe DiMaggio, then in the midst of divorce proceedings with film star Marilyn Monroe, hired Ruditsky to discover whether she was having an extramarital affair.

On the evening of November 5, 1954, one of Ruditsky's associates, 21-year-old Phil Irwin, observed Monroe's Cadillac parked at Kilkea Drive and Waring Avenue. Monroe was visiting a friend, actress Sheila Stewart; however, DiMaggio suspected at the time that Monroe was having an affair with her vocal coach Hal Schaefer and that Stewart, one of Schaefer's students, was letting the two use her apartment. Irwin reported to Ruditsky, who phoned DiMaggio, who was dining with Frank Sinatra at an Italian restaurant in Hollywood, the Villa Capri. DiMaggio and Sinatra, along with Sinatra's manager Henry Sanicola and Villa Capri owner Pasquale "Patsy" D'Amore, arrived at the address less than an hour later, where they met with Ruditsky and Irwin. Together, the group entered the two-story apartment building, broke down the door of one of the three rooms, and rushed into the bedroom with a cameraman expecting to catch the couple in bed. Instead, the lights from the flash camera revealed the frightened occupant, 37-year-old secretary Florence Kotz Ross. Realizing their mistake, they quickly fled from the building. The police were called; however, because Kotz Ross was unable to identify the intruders, the case, then thought to be an attempted burglary, remained unsolved and was finally closed by the LAPD almost a year later.

The entire incident came out in the September 1955 issue of Confidential, which called it the "Wrong Door Raid"; it became a legendary story in Hollywood gossip and caused embarrassment for all parties involved. After the story broke, Kotz Ross sued DiMaggio and Sinatra for $200,000; they settled out of court. Two years later, the incident was revisited by a state legislative committee as part of its investigation of the "Hollywood gutter press". Shortly thereafter, California Attorney General Pat Brown brought a criminal libel suit against Confidential. Ruditsky, who was then suffering from heart problems and whose second wife, Reggie, had recently died, was excused from testifying before the investigative committee. The negative publicity created by the "Wrong Door Raid", and the discovery that his detective firm did not have a state license, seriously harmed his reputation. Ruditsky subsequently retired as a P.I., later commenting: "[P]rivate detective work is a dirty, filthy, rotten business".

== Later years and death ==
Though his detective career had ended in scandal, Ruditsky managed to redeem himself though his literary efforts by the late 1950s. After a decade of negotiations, an agreement was made with the National Broadcasting Company (NBC) to create a television series based on his unpublished memoirs. In 1959, The Lawless Years, a half-hour weekly series based on Ruditsky's Angel's Corner, debuted on NBC with Ruditsky being portrayed by James Gregory. Ruditsky himself served as technical adviser on the series, which was widely praised for its attention to detail. He was also a part-time casting director and contacted old criminal associates to portray criminals in the series. His only condition for working on the series was that his stories be kept as accurate and realistic as possible. Although the producers did not show the more graphic details from Angel's Corner, such as the use of ice picks and hot pokers, the events seen on each episode were generally a faithful depiction of Prohibition-era gangland violence. The Lawless Years ran during the summer television season for three years before being canceled in 1961. The show was the first of its kind and inspired the creation of its ABC network rival, the long-running series The Untouchables, based on Eliot Ness's exploits against Al Capone and the Chicago underworld.

Ruditsky died in Los Angeles from a heart attack on October 19, 1962, only nine days after being admitted to Cedars of Lebanon Hospital for surgery to remove a tumor from his colon. He was survived by a son, Martin Phillips of Los Angeles. He was buried at Hillside Memorial Park.

== In popular fiction ==
Barney Ruditsky, a popular police detective in his lifetime, has been portrayed in television, books and comics.

Books

- Ruditsky is a major character in William Heffernan's fictionalized biography Broderick (1983)
- Ruditsky is a minor character in Denise Hamilton's historical novel The Last Embrace (2008)
- Ruditsky is a minor character in Adam Braver's fictionalized biography Misfit (2012)
- Fictional detective Fred Rubinski, a major character in Max Allan Collins' short story "Unreasonable Doubt", is based on Barney Ruditsky.

Comic books;

- Ruditsky appears as himself in the first issue of Mystery Men Comics (August 1939).

Television

- Ruditsky is portrayed by actor James Gregory in the 1950s television series The Lawless Years
- Danny Arnold, creator of the 1970s television series Barney Miller, named the show in honor of his old friend by using his longtime nickname "Barney".

== Bibliography ==
- Angel's Corner (unpublished memoirs, later used as the basis of The Lawless Years)

== Filmography ==
=== Film ===
| Year | Film | Role |
|---|---|---|
| 1943 | Margin for Error | Policeman (uncredited) |
| 1946 | Behind Green Lights | Policeman (uncredited) |
| 1946 | Nocturne | Technical advisor |

=== Television ===
| Series | As director | As writer | As technical advisor |
|---|---|---|---|
| The Lawless Years | — | 27 episodes | 27 episodes |
