= Albert E. Austin =

American surgeon and politician (1877–1942)

Albert Elmer Austin
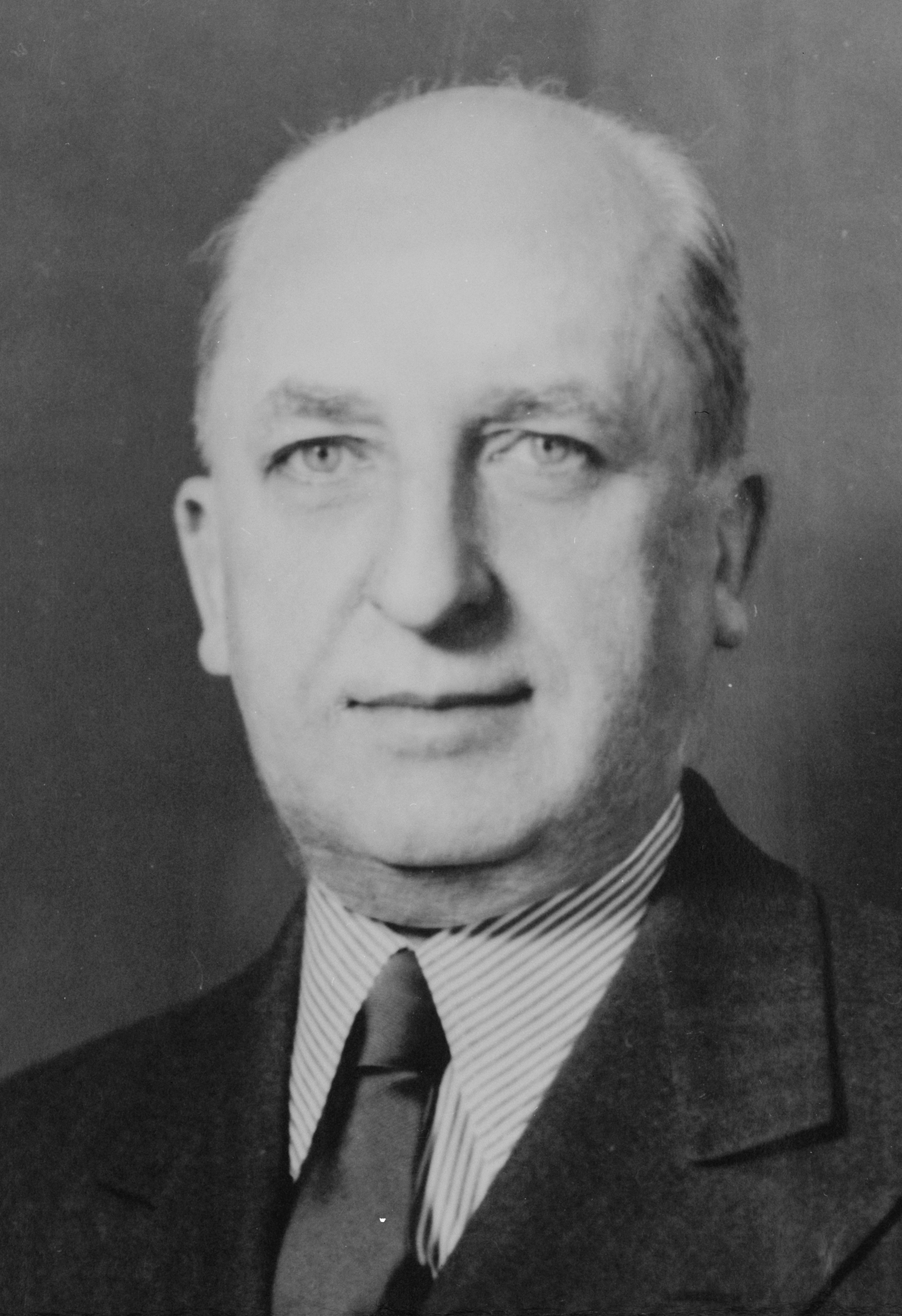
- Austin c. 1930s

Member of the U.S. House of Representatives from Connecticut's 4th district
- In office January 3, 1939 – January 3, 1941
- Preceded by: Alfred N. Phillips
- Succeeded by: Le Roy D. Downs

Member of the Connecticut House of Representatives from Greenwich
- In office 1917–1919 Serving with Henry P. Crawford
- Preceded by: Joseph P. Crosby; E. Belcher Mead
- Succeeded by: James F. Walsh; Frank A. Rooke
- In office 1921–1923 Serving with Charles S. Wills
- Preceded by: James F. Walsh; Frank A. Rooke
- Succeeded by: Elkanah Mead; Frederick A. Hubbard

Personal details
- Born: November 15, 1877 Medway, Massachusetts, U.S.
- Died: January 26, 1942 (aged 64) Greenwich, Connecticut, U.S.
- Party: Republican
- Spouse(s): Anne Tyrell Christy Austin; Anne Clara Snyder Austin; Lillian V. Lounsbury Austin
- Education: Amherst College; Jefferson Medical College
- Occupation: Physician

Albert Elmer Austin (November 15, 1877 – January 26, 1942) was a surgeon and Republican member of the United States House of Representatives from 1939 to 1941 and member of the Connecticut House of Representatives from 1917 to 1919 and from 1921 to 1923. He was the stepfather of Clare Boothe Luce.

== Biography ==
Born in Medway, Massachusetts, Austin attended the public schools and graduated from Amherst College in 1899 and served as member of the faculty of Attleboro High School (Massachusetts) from 1899 to 1900. He graduated from Jefferson Medical College, Philadelphia, Pennsylvania, in 1905. He was married to Anne Tyrell Christy and they divorced in 1916.

During the First World War, Austin served as regimental surgeon in the Two Hundred and Fourteenth Engineers, Fourteenth (Wolverine) Division from 1918 to 1919. He was married on May 17, 1919, to Anne Clara Snyder who was killed in automobile-train accident in Miami, Florida in 1938. She was the mother of Clare Boothe Luce. He married Lillian V. Lounsbury on September 3, 1939.

Austin was a practicing physician in Old Greenwich, Connecticut from 1907 to 1939. He also engaged in banking in Old Greenwich, Connecticut from 1926 to 1942.

Austin was a very active member of Acacia Lodge No. 85 of Ancient, Free and Accepted Masons in Greenwich, Connecticut. He was raised to the sublime degree of a Master Mason on October 31, 1916. He became the worshipful master of the lodge in 1919 and served in such capacity with great achievement and distinction for five years. He led the successful efforts in raising the necessary funds for a permanent masonic temple building in town. For five years he raised the money necessary to purchase the land from Oliver D. Mead's old homestead which is where Havemeyer Place meets Milbank Avenue. Austin was the first to turn the sod on the Mead lot and the building still stands proudly at 28 Havemeyer Place (though the lodge no longer meets there having sold it many decades ago). Austin also served as the first District Deputy of the First Masonic District of the Most Worshipful Grand Lodge of the State of Connecticut. He was also a member of the York Rite and Scottish Rite bodies. In 1939, in recognition for all his efforts for Masonry, public health and in the National Government he was conferred the 33rd degree.

Austin served as member of the Connecticut House of Representatives from 1917 to 1919; and from 1921 to 1923. He was elected as a Republican to the Seventy-sixth Congress and served from January 3, 1939, to January 3, 1941. He was an unsuccessful candidate for reelection in 1940 to the Seventy-seventh Congress.

== Death ==
Austin resumed his medical profession until his death in Greenwich, Connecticut on January 26, 1942, aged 64 years, 72 days. He is interred at Ferncliff Cemetery, Hartsdale, New York. He was a member of the American Medical Association. Learning of Austin's death, the Most Worshipful Grand Lodge of the State of Connecticut wrote a resolution in their proceedings for that year to honor Albert E. Austin. It ended with the following words, "His death brought to an end a busy life spent for the betterment of his fellowman."

U.S. House of Representatives
Preceded by Alfred N. Phillips	Member of the U.S. House of Representatives from Connecticut's 4th congressional district 1939 – 1941	Succeeded by Le Roy D. Downs
