= James Gregory (actor) =

American actor (1911–2002)

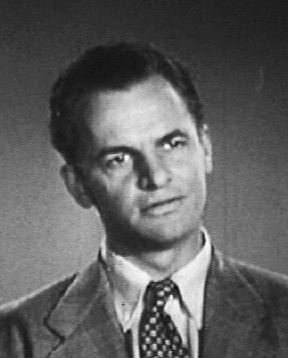
- Gregory in 1948
- Born: December 23, 1911; New York City, U.S.
- Died: September 16, 2002 (aged 90); Sedona, Arizona, U.S.
- Occupation: Actor
- Years active: 1939–1986
- Spouse: Ann Miltner

James Gregory (December 23, 1911 – September 16, 2002) was an American character actor who played roles such as Schaffer in Al Capone (1959), the McCarthy-like Sen. John Iselin in The Manchurian Candidate (1962), General Ursus in Beneath the Planet of the Apes (1970), and Inspector Frank Luger in the television sitcom Barney Miller (1975–1982).

== Career ==
In 1939, he made his Broadway debut in a production of Key Largo. He served from 1941 to 1946 in the United States Navy during World War II. His early acting work included army training films; one such appearance is excerpted in The Atomic Café (1982). He also worked in radio, including a year (1955–1956) on 21st Precinct.

Gregory was the lead in The Lawless Years, a 1920s-era crime drama which aired 45 episodes on NBC. In the series, which ran from 1959 to 1961, he played NYPD Detective Barney Ruditsky.

After his appearance as the McCarthyistic Senator Iselin in The Manchurian Candidate (1962), Gregory starred in the film PT 109 (1963) with Cliff Robertson. He played Dean Martin's spy boss MacDonald, in three of the Matt Helm film series; in the original Star Trek series in the episode "Dagger of the Mind" (1966), as Dr. Tristan Adams; and in the Elvis Presley film Clambake (1967). In the pilot movie for the 1968 Hawaii Five-O series, Gregory became the first actor to portray State Department official Jonathan Kaye, a recurring character on the series.

Gregory portrayed Nick Hannigan on Detective School. He was a semiregular on the TV series Barney Miller as Deputy Inspector Frank Luger. His final acting credit was in a 1986 episode of Mr. Belvedere.

== Personal life and death ==
Gregory was married to Ann Miltner for 58 years. He died of natural causes on September 16, 2002, in Sedona, Arizona, aged 90.

== Selected TV and filmography ==
- The Naked City (1948) as Patrolman Albert Hicks (uncredited)
- The Frogmen (1951) as Chief Petty Officer Lane (uncredited)
- Studio One in Hollywood (1954–1958, TV series) as Mr. Bales / James Metcalf / Mr. Black / Private Alan Pomeroy / Corey / George Monzo / Gasman
- The Scarlet Hour (1956) as Ralph Nevins
- Nightfall (1956) as Ben Fraser
- Alfred Hitchcock Presents (1957) (Season 2 Episode 24: "The Cream of the Jest") as Wayne Campbell
- Alfred Hitchcock Presents (1957) (Season 3 Episode 3: "The Perfect Crime") as John Gregory
- The Young Stranger (1957) as Police Sergeant Shipley
- The Big Caper (1957) as Flood
- Gun Glory (1957) as Grimsell
- Alfred Hitchcock Presents (1958) (Season 3 Episode 33: "Post Mortem") as Mr. Wescott
- Underwater Warrior (1958) as Lieutenant William Arnold, MD
- Onionhead (1958) as Lieutenant Commander Fox (or the Skipper)
- The Twilight Zone (1959–1961, TV series) as Air Force General / Confederate Sergeant
- Lux Playhouse (1959, TV series) as Johnny Warcheck
- Al Capone (1959) as Sergeant Schaefler
- Hey Boy! Hey Girl! (1959) as Father Burton
- The Lawless Years (1959–1961, TV series) as Barney Ruditsky
- Laramie (1959–1963, TV series) as Richards / Father Elliott
- Wagon Train (1960, TV series) as Ricky Bell
- The DuPont Show with June Allyson (1960, TV series) as John Kramer
- General Electric Theater as Swandy Green in "Sarah's Laughter" (1960, TV episode) as Sandy Green
- Frontier Circus (1961, TV series) as Jacob Carno
- The New Breed (1961, TV series) as Father Al
- The Untouchables (1961, TV series) as Walter Trager
- X-15 (1961) as Tom Deparma
- Target: The Corruptors (1962, TV series) as Terran
- The Virginian (1962, TV series) as Slim Jessup
- Two Weeks in Another Town (1962) as Brad Byrd
- The Manchurian Candidate (1962) as Senator John Yerkes Iselin
- Empire (1962, TV series) as Theron Haskell
- Sam Benedict (1963, TV Series) as John Paul Elcott
- The Eleventh Hour (1963, TV series) as Eddie Forman
- PT 109 (1963) as Commander C.R. Ritchie
- Twilight of Honor (1963) as Norris Bixby
- The Alfred Hitchcock Hour (1963) (Season 2 Episode 9: "The Dividing Wall") as Fred Kruger
- Rawhide (1963–1965, TV series) as Lash Whitcomb / Mister Brothers / Owen Spencer
- The Lieutenant (1963–1964, TV series) as Sergeant Horace 'Biff' Capp / Sergeant Horace Capp
- Captain Newman, M.D. (1963) as Colonel Edgar Pyser
- Breaking Point (1964, TV series) as Malcolm
- The Defenders (1964, TV series) as Paul Tasso
- A Distant Trumpet (1964) as Major General Alexander Upton Quaint
- Quick Before It Melts (1964) as Vice Admiral
- Bonanza (1964–1969, TV series) as Sergeant Mike Russell / Mulvaney / Whitney Parker
- The Sons of Katie Elder (1965) as Morgan Hastings
- Gunsmoke (1965–1968, TV series) as John Scanlon / Judge Calvin Strom / Wes Martin
- The Wild, Wild West (1965, TV series) as Ulysses S. Grant
- A Rage to Live (1965) as Dr. O'Brien
- A Man Called Shenandoah (1966, TV series) as Jake Roberts
- The Big Valley four episodes: "Pursuit" and "Ambush" as Simon Carter, "The Challenge" as Senator Jim Bannard, and "The Other Face of Justice" as Harry Bodine
- F Troop (1966–1967, TV series) as Major Duncan / Big Jim Parker
- The Silencers (1966) as MacDonald
- Hogan's Heroes (1966, TV series) as German General Biedenbender
- The Fugitive (1966, TV series) as Pete Crandall
- Star Trek: The Original Series (1966) – Dr. Tristan Adams in S1:E9, "Dagger of the Mind"
- Murderers' Row (1966) as MacDonald
- My Three Sons (1967, TV series) as Cappy Engstrom
- The Virginian (1967, TV series) as Cal Young
- Clambake (1967) as Duster Hayward
- The Ambushers (1967) as MacDonald
- The Secret War of Harry Frigg (1968) as General Homer Prentiss
- The Mod Squad (1968, TV series) as Gus Williams
- The Love God? (1969) as Darrell Evans Hughes
- Hawaii-Five-O (1969) as Jonathan Kaye and Mike Finney
- Beneath the Planet of the Apes (1970) as General Ursus
- The Hawaiians (1970) as Dr. Whipple Sr. (uncredited)
- The Million Dollar Duck (1971) as Rutledge
- Shoot Out (1971) as Sam Foley
- The Late Liz (1971) as Sam Burns
- Ironside (1972, TV series) as TV show host
- Columbo (1972, TV Series) as Coach Rizzo / David L. Buckner
- Mission: Impossible "The Bride" (1972, TV series) as Joe Corvin
- All in the Family (1972, TV Series) as William R. Kirkwood
- Search "Operation Iceman" (1972, TV series) as Ambassador Gordon Essex
- Miracle on 34th Street (1973, TV movie) as Deputy District Attorney Thomas Mara
- M*A*S*H (1974, TV series) as Lieutenant General Robert 'Iron Guts' Kelly
- The Partridge Family (1974, TV series) "Danny Drops Out" as Claude Tubbles
- Police Story (1974, TV series) 4 episodes
- The F.B.I. (1974, TV Series) as Frank Bonner
- Emergency! (1975, TV Series) as Brackett's Father
- Barney Miller (1975–1982, TV series) as Deputy Inspector Frank Luger (66 episodes)
- The Strongest Man in the World (1975) as Chief Blair
- Sanford and Son (1976) as Commander
- The Bastard (1978, TV movie) as Will Campbell
- The Main Event (1979) as Gough
- Detective School (1979, TV series) as Nick Hannigan
- The Comeback Kid (1980, TV movie) as Scotty
- The Great American Traffic Jam (1980, TV movie) as General Caruthers
- The Flight of Dragons (1982) as Bryagh / Smrgol (voice)
- Wait Till Your Mother Gets Home! (1983, TV movie) as Dan Peters
- Mr. Belvedere (1986, TV series) as Mr. Sparks (final appearance)
