= Girl Overboard (1937 film) =

1937 film directed by Sidney Salkow

- Directed by: Sidney Salkow
- Screenplay by: Tristram Tupper
- Story by: Sarah Elizabeth Rodger
- Produced by: Robert Presnell
- Starring: Gloria Stuart; Walter Pidgeon; Billy Burrud
- Cinematography: Ira Morgan
- Edited by: Philip Cahn
- Music by: M. W. Stoloff; John Leipold
- Production company: Universal Pictures
- Release date: February 28, 1937 (US)
- Running time: 58 minutes
- Country: United States
- Language: English

Girl Overboard is a 1937 American mystery film directed by Sidney Salkow from a screenplay by Tristram Tupper based on a story by Sara Elizabeth Rodger. The film stars Gloria Stuart, Walter Pidgeon and Billy Burrud, and was released on February 28, 1937.

== Cast list ==
- Gloria Stuart as Mary Chesbrooke
- Walter Pidgeon as Paul Stacey
- Billy Burrud as Bobby Stacey
- Hobart Cavanaugh as Joe Gray
- Gerald Oliver Smith as Harvey
- Sidney Blackmer as Alex LeMaire
- Jack Smart as Wilbur Jenkins
- David Oliver as Dutch
- Charlotte Wynters as Molly Shane
- Russell Hicks as Sam LeMaire
- R. E. O'Connor as Sergeant Hatton
- Edward McNamara as Captain Murphy
- Charles Wilson as Editor
- Selmer Jackson as Captain Hartman
