= Le Roy D. Downs =

American politician

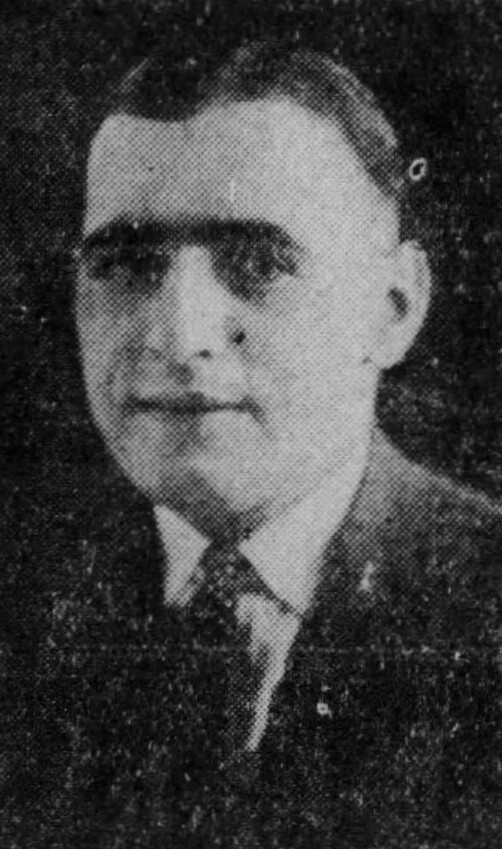
- Downs in 1934

Member of the U.S. House of Representatives from Connecticut's 4th district
- In office January 3, 1941 – January 3, 1943
- Preceded by: Albert E. Austin
- Succeeded by: Clare Boothe Luce

Personal details
- Born: April 11, 1900 Danbury, Connecticut, U.S.
- Died: January 18, 1970 (aged 69) Norwalk, Connecticut, U.S.
- Party: Democratic
- Spouse: Mabel Miller
- Children: 1
- Occupation: Newspaper publisher; politician

Military service
- Allegiance: United States
- Branch: United States Army
- Years of service: 1917–1918
- Rank: corporal
- Conflict: World War I

Le Roy Donnelly Downs (April 11, 1900 – January 18, 1970) was an American politician who was a Democratic U.S. Representative from Connecticut's 4th congressional district from 1941 to 1943.

== Early life and family ==
He was born in Danbury, Connecticut, April 11, 1900. Downs attended the public schools of his native city. He enlisted on August 27, 1917, and served as a corporal in United States Army, with four months' service in France, being discharged on December 21, 1918. He engaged as a newspaper publisher in South Norwalk, Connecticut, in 1923. He married Mabel Miller, with whom he had one son, William.

== Political career ==
He served as chairman and member of the Veterans' Home Building Commission 1931–1938. He served as city clerk of Norwalk, Connecticut from 1933 to 1940.

Downs was elected to the Seventy-seventh Congress (January 3, 1941 – January 3, 1943). He was an unsuccessful for reelection in 1942 to the Seventy-eighth Congress, having been defeated by Republican candidate Clare Boothe Luce. He then resumed the newspaper publishing business.

He served as Comptroller of the city of Norwalk, Connecticut from 1943 to 1944 and War Manpower Director for southwestern Connecticut 1944–1946.

He ran unsuccessfully for mayor of Norwalk in 1949 and 1959.

He served as regional representative for the Veterans' Administration in New York, New Jersey, and Pennsylvania from 1961 until his death, January 18, 1970, in Norwalk, Connecticut. He was interred in Riverside Cemetery.

U.S. House of Representatives
Preceded by Albert E. Austin	Member of the U.S. House of Representatives from Connecticut's 4th congressional district 1941 – 1943	Succeeded by Clare Boothe Luce
