= Shomrim Society =

Fraternal organization of Jewish police

The Shomrim Societies are fraternal organizations of Jewish members of police departments, such as the New York City Police Department and the Chicago Police Department.

== NYPD Shomrim ==
The first Shomrim Society was established in 1924 with 240 of the 700 Jewish members of the New York Police Department with the approval of New York City Police Commissioner Richard Enright. Lieutenant Jacob Kaminsky was the NYPD Shomrim Society's first president, and the society was announced by Dr. Isidore Frank, the Jewish chaplain of the NYPD. It is rumored that a comment made to a young Kaminski, while on patrol, was the spark that started this fraternal and charitable organization. It was suggested that he might feel more at home with a salami, rather than a nightstick, under his arm. At that time only 1% of the department was Jewish.

Shomrim blossomed in New York during the depression years. Civil service jobs provided the only secure means of making a living in those days. The civil service lists of 1935-37 added 400 new Shomrim members. One of Shomrim's early presidents, Max Finkelstein, became famous in 1938 when he was selected by New York Mayor Fiorello H. La Guardia to oversee security for visiting officials from Nazi Germany and to guard the German consulate.

The Shomrim Society is not affiliated with the Shomrim neighborhood watch groups in many Orthodox Jewish neighborhoods.

In 2023, Shomrim Society member Samuel Winsbacher graduated as valedictorian New York Police Department’s training academy.

Today, Shomrim Society members hold many different positions in the NYPD, including almost every rank. The highest ranking uniformed female police officer is a three star chief and she is also the current highest-ranking member of the Shomrim Society.
