= Clare Boothe Luce =

American author and politician (1903–1987)

United States Ambassador to Italy
- In office May 4, 1953 – December 27, 1956
- President: Dwight D. Eisenhower
- Preceded by: Ellsworth Bunker
- Succeeded by: James David Zellerbach

Member of the U.S. House of Representatives from Connecticut's 4th district
- In office January 3, 1943 – January 3, 1947
- Preceded by: Le Roy D. Downs
- Succeeded by: John Lodge

Personal details
- Born: Ann Clare Boothe; March 10, 1903 New York City, U.S.
- Died: October 9, 1987 (aged 84) Washington, D.C., U.S.
- Party: Republican
- Spouses: George Tuttle Brokaw (m. 1923; div. 1929); Henry Luce (m. 1935; died 1967)
- Children: 1

Clare Boothe Luce (née Ann Clare Boothe; March 10, 1903 – October 9, 1987) was an American writer, politician, diplomat, and public intellectual. A versatile author, she is best known for her 1936 hit play The Women, which had an all-female cast. Her writings extended from drama and screen scenarios to fiction, journalism, and war reportage. She served as a U.S. representative from Connecticut's 4th congressional district from 1943 to 1947, and as U.S. Ambassador to Italy from 1953 to 1956. She was married to Henry Luce, publisher of Time, Life, Fortune, and Sports Illustrated. She converted to Catholicism in 1946.

Politically, Luce was a leading conservative in later life and was well known for her anti-communism. In her youth, she briefly aligned herself with the liberalism of President Franklin Roosevelt as a protégé of Bernard Baruch but later became an outspoken critic of Roosevelt. Although she was a strong supporter of the Anglo-American alliance in World War II, she remained outspokenly critical of British colonialism in India.

Luce campaigned for every Republican presidential nominee from Wendell Willkie to Ronald Reagan.

== Early life ==
Luce was born Ann Clare Boothe in New York City on March 10, 1903, the second child of Anna Clara Schneider (also known as Ann Snyder Murphy, Ann Boothe, and Ann Clare Austin) and William Franklin Boothe (also known as "John J. Murphy" and "Jord Murfe"). Her parents were not married and would separate in 1912. Her father, a sophisticated man and a brilliant violinist, instilled in his daughter a love of literature, if not of music, but he had trouble holding a job and spent years as a traveling salesman. Parts of young Clare's childhood were spent in Memphis and Nashville, Tennessee, Chicago, Illinois, and Union City, New Jersey as well as New York City. Clare Boothe had an elder brother, David Franklin Boothe.

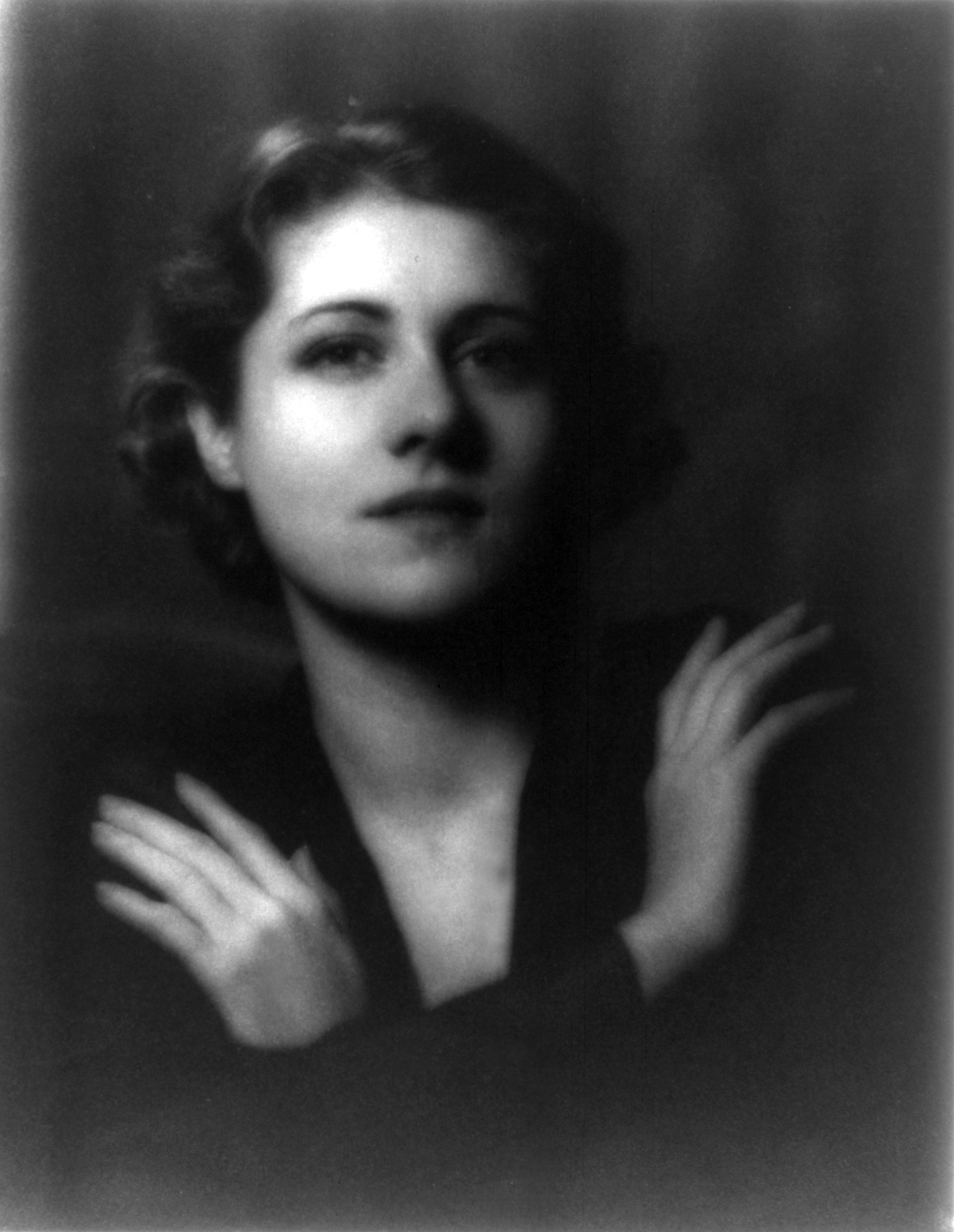
Clare Boothe as a young socialite in the 1920s

She attended the cathedral schools in Garden City and Tarrytown, New York, graduating first in her class in 1919 at 16. Her ambitious mother's initial plan for her was to become an actress. Clare understudied Mary Pickford on Broadway at age 10, and had her Broadway debut in Mrs. Henry B. Harris' production of "The Dummy" in 1914, a detective comedy. She then had a small part in Thomas Edison's 1915 movie, The Heart of a Waif. After a tour of Europe with her mother and stepfather, Dr. Albert E. Austin, whom Ann Boothe married in 1919, she became interested in the women's suffrage movement, and she was hired by Alva Belmont to work for the National Woman's Party in Washington, D.C. and Seneca Falls, New York.

She wed George Tuttle Brokaw, millionaire heir to a New York clothing fortune, on August 10, 1923, at the age of 20. They had one daughter, Ann Clare Brokaw (1924–1944), who was killed in a car accident. According to Boothe, Brokaw was a hopeless alcoholic, and the marriage ended in divorce on May 20, 1929.

On November 23, 1935, she married Henry Luce, the publisher of Time, Life, and Fortune. She thereafter called herself Clare Boothe Luce, a frequently misspelled name that was often confused with that of her exact contemporary Claire Luce, a stage and film actress. As a professional writer, Luce continued to use her maiden name.

In 1939, she commissioned Frida Kahlo to paint a portrait of the late Dorothy Hale. Kahlo produced The Suicide Of Dorothy Hale. Luce was appalled and almost destroyed it; however, Isamu Noguchi dissuaded her. Luce later anonymously donated the painting to the Phoenix Art Museum.

On January 11, 1944, her only child, Ann Clare Brokaw, a 19-year-old senior at Stanford University, was killed in an automobile accident. As a result of the tragedy, Luce explored psychotherapy and religion. After grief counseling with Bishop Fulton Sheen, she was received into the Catholic Church in 1946. She became an ardent essayist and lecturer in celebration of her faith, and she was ultimately honored by being named a Dame of Malta. As a memorial to her daughter, beginning in 1949 she funded the construction of a Catholic church in Palo Alto for use by the Stanford campus ministry. The new Saint Ann Chapel was dedicated in 1951. It was sold by the diocese in 1998 and in 2003 became a church of the Anglican Province of Christ the King.

== Marriage to Henry Luce ==
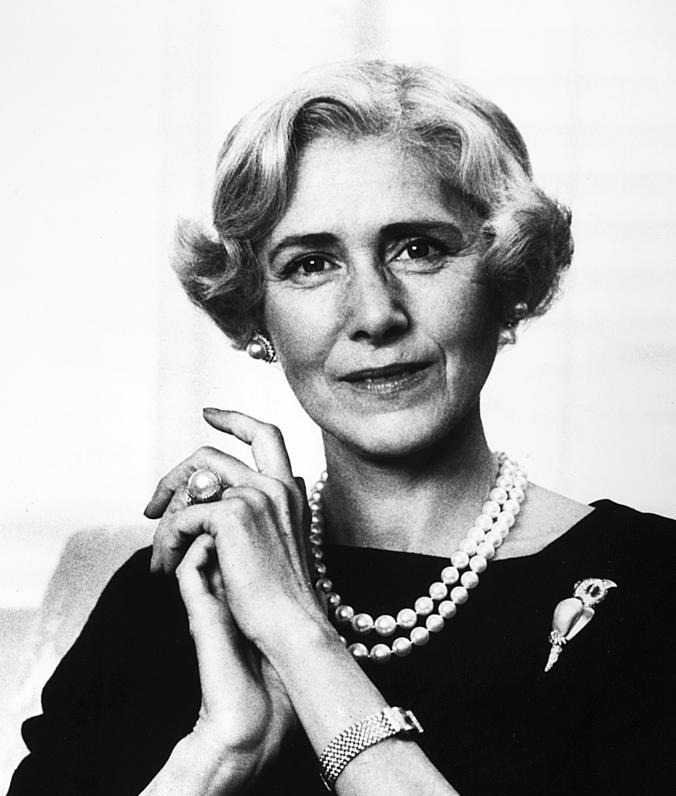
Luce in 1950

The marriage between Clare and Henry was difficult. Henry was by any standard extremely successful, but his physical awkwardness, lack of humor, and newsman's discomfort with any conversation that was not strictly factual put him in awe of his beautiful wife's social poise, wit, and fertile imagination. Clare's years as managing editor of Vanity Fair left her with an avid interest in journalism (she suggested the idea of Life magazine to her husband before it was developed internally). Henry himself was generous in encouraging her to write for Life, but the question of how much coverage she should be accorded in Time, as she grew more famous, was always a careful balancing act for Henry since he did not want to be accused of nepotism.

It has been reported that their marriage was sexually "open". Clare Luce's lovers included Ambassador Joseph P. Kennedy, CIA Director Allen Dulles, Randolph Churchill, General Lucian Truscott, General Charles Willoughby, and Roald Dahl.

Joseph P. Kennedy was the father of several United States politicians. Clare Luce at times provided advice to the campaigns of John F. Kennedy, who became the 35th U.S. president.

Dahl, who became a very successful author after the war, was at the time a young RAF fighter pilot, temporarily assigned to Washington. He was part of a plan developed by spymaster Sir William Stephenson (code name "Intrepid"), intended to weaken American isolationist thinking by influencing, among others, American journalists and politicians. Dahl was

"...instructed to romance Clare, who was thirteen years his senior, to see if, with the right kind of encouragement, she could warm to the British position."

The very tall (6'6") and athletic Dahl later claimed he found his affair with Clare to be so physically demanding that he had begged the British ambassador to relieve him of the task, but the ambassador told him he must continue.

In the early 1960s, both Luces were friends of philosopher, author, and LSD advocate Gerald Heard. They tried LSD one time under his careful supervision. Although taking LSD never turned into a habit for either of the Luces, a friend (and biographer of Clare), Wilfred Sheed, wrote that Clare made use of it at least several times.

The Luces stayed together until Henry's death from a heart attack in 1967. As one of the great "power couples" in American history, they were bonded by their mutual interests and complementary, if contrasting, characters. They treated each other with respect in public, never more so than when he willingly acted as his wife's consort during her years as ambassador to Italy. She was never able to convert him to Catholicism (he was the son of a Presbyterian missionary), but he did not question the sincerity of her faith, often attended Mass with her, and defended her when she was criticized by his fellow Protestants.

In the early years of her widowhood, she retired to the luxurious beach house that she and her husband had planned in Honolulu, but boredom with life in what she called "this fur-lined rut" brought her back to Washington, D.C. for increasingly long periods. She made her final home there in 1983.

== Writing career ==
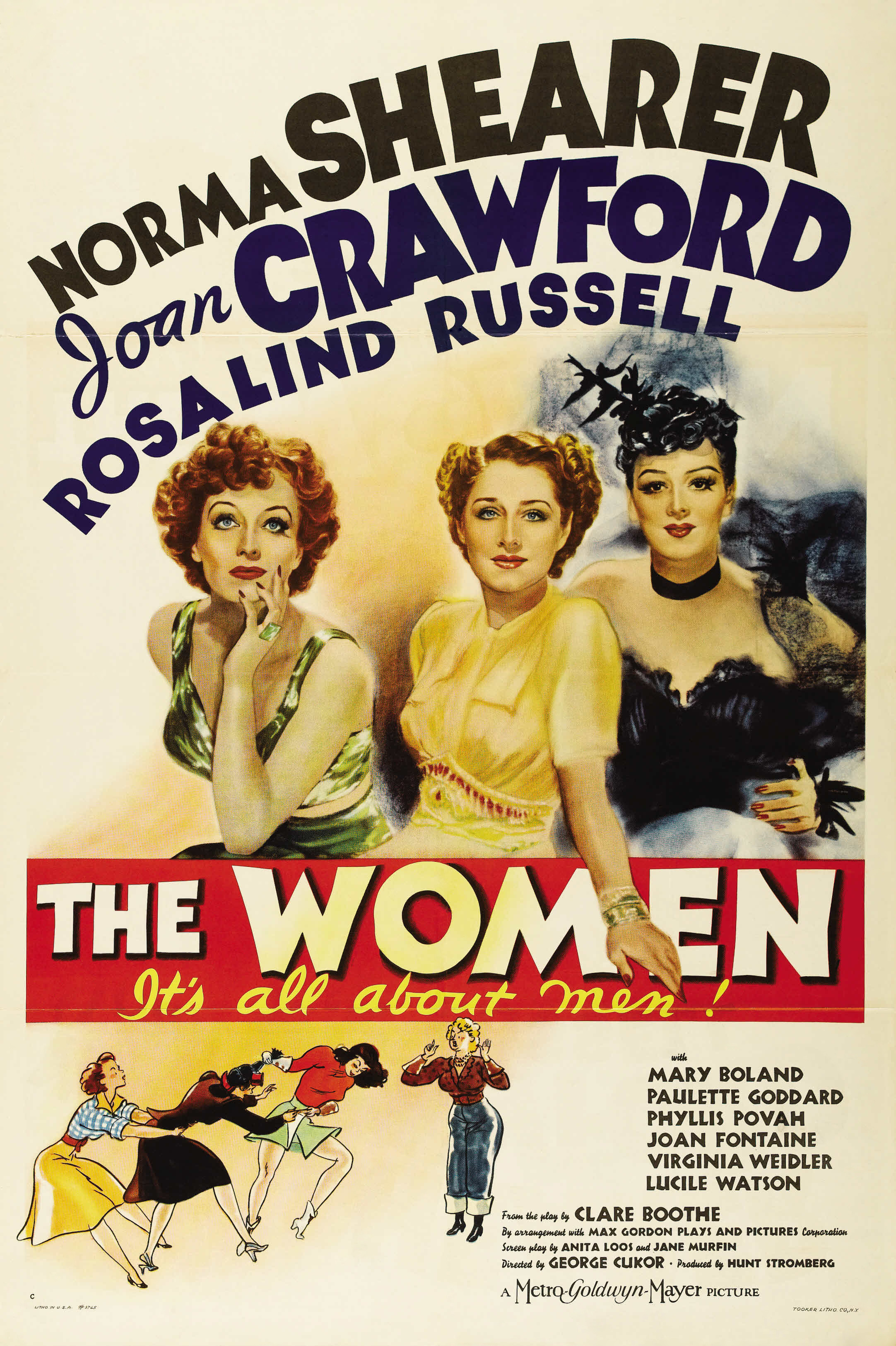
Poster from the 1939 film The Women

Luce published Stuffed Shirts, a volume of short stories, in 1931. Scribner's Magazine compared the work to Evelyn Waugh's Vile Bodies for its bitter humor. The New York Times found it socially superficial, but praised its "lovely festoons of epigrams" and beguiling stylishness: "What malice there may be in these pages has a felinity that is the purest Angoran." The book's device of characters interlinked from story to story was borrowed from Sherwood Anderson's Winesburg, Ohio (1919), but it impressed Andre Maurois, who asked Luce's permission to imitate it. Luce also published many magazine articles. She was also a playwright.

After the failure of her initial stage effort, the marital melodrama Abide With Me (1935), she rapidly followed up with a satirical comedy, The Women. Deploying a cast of no fewer than 40 actresses who discussed men in often scorching language, it became a Broadway smash in 1936 and, three years later, a successful Hollywood movie known for its exclusively female cast. Toward the end of her life, Luce claimed that for half a century, she had steadily received royalties from productions of The Women all around the world. Later in the 1930s, she wrote two more successful, but less durable plays, also both made into movies: Kiss the Boys Goodbye and Margin for Error. The latter work "presented an all-out attack on the Nazis' racist philosophy". Its opening night in Princeton, New Jersey, on October 14, 1939, was attended by Albert Einstein and Thomas Mann. Otto Preminger directed and starred in both the Broadway production and screen adaptation.

Much of Luce's famously acid wit ("No good deed goes unpunished", "Widowhood is a fringe benefit of marriage", "A hospital is no place to be sick") can be traced back to the days when, as a wealthy young divorcee in the early 1930s, she became a caption writer at Vogue and then an associate editor and managing editor of Vanity Fair. She not only edited the works of such humorists as P. G. Wodehouse and Corey Ford but also contributed many comic pieces of her own, signed and unsigned.

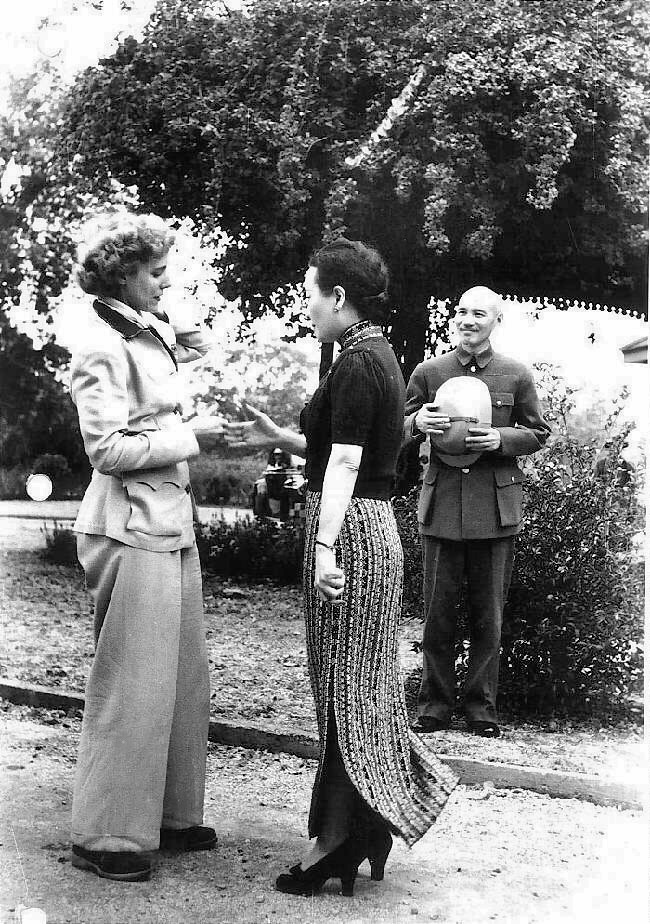
General Chiang Kai-shek and Madame Chiang welcome Clare Boothe Luce, April 1942.

Another branch of Luce's literary career was that of war journalism. Europe in the Spring was the result of a four-month tour of Britain, Belgium, the Netherlands, Italy, and France in 1939–1940 as a correspondent for Life magazine. She described the widening battleground of World War II as "a world where men have decided to die together because they are unable to find a way to live together." In his review of Luce's "lively eyewitness report," Charles C. Clayton commended Luce for being "deadly earnest about the significance to America of what happened to Europe in the spring."

In 1941, Luce and her husband toured China and reported on the status of the country and its war with Japan. Her profile of General Douglas MacArthur was on the cover of Life on December 8, 1941, the day after the Japanese attacked Pearl Harbor. After the United States entered the war, Luce toured military installations in Africa, India, China, and Burma, compiling a further series of reports for Life. She published interviews with General Harold Alexander, commander of British troops in the Middle East, Chiang Kai-shek, Jawaharlal Nehru, and General Stilwell, commander of American troops in the China-Burma-India theater.

Being in the right place at the right time and having easy access to key commanders made her an influential figure on both sides of the Atlantic. She endured bombing raids and other dangers in Europe and the Far East. She did not hesitate to criticize the unwarlike lifestyle of General Sir Claude Auchinleck's Middle East Command. One draft article for Life, noting that the general lived far from the Egyptian front in a houseboat, and mocking RAF pilots as "flying fairies", was discovered by British Customs when she passed through Trinidad in April 1942. It caused such Allied consternation that she briefly faced house arrest. Coincidentally or not, Auchinleck was fired a few months later by Winston Churchill. Her varied experiences in all the major war theaters qualified her for a seat the following year on the House Military Affairs Committee after she was elected to the United States House of Representatives in 1942.

Luce never wrote an autobiography but willed her enormous archive of personal papers to the Library of Congress.

== Political career ==
=== House of Representatives ===
In 1942, Luce won a seat in the United States House of Representatives as a Republican comprising the whole of Fairfield County, Connecticut, the 4th Congressional District. She based her platform on three goals: "One, to win the war. Two, to prosecute that war as loyally and effectively as we can as Republicans. Three, to bring about a better world and a durable peace, with special attention to post-war security and employment here at home." She took up the seat formerly held by her late stepfather, Dr. Albert Austin. An outspoken critic of Roosevelt's foreign policy, Luce was supported by isolationists and conservatives in Congress, and she was appointed early to the prestigious House Military Affairs Committee. Although she was by no means the only female representative on the floor, her beauty, wealth, and penchant for slashing witticisms caused her to be treated patronizingly by colleagues of both sexes. She made a debut in her maiden speech, coining the phrase "globaloney" to disparage Vice President Henry Wallace's recommendation for airlines of the world to be given free access to US airports. She called for repeal of the Chinese Exclusion Act, comparing its "doctrine of race theology" to Adolf Hitler's, advocated aid for war victims abroad, and sided with the administration on issues such as infant-care and maternity appropriations for the wives of enlisted men. Nevertheless, Roosevelt took a dislike to her and campaigned in 1944 to attempt to prevent her re-election, publicly calling her "a sharp-tongued glamor girl of forty." She retaliated by accusing Roosevelt of being "the only American president who ever lied us into a war because he did not have the political courage to lead us into it."

During her second term, Luce was instrumental in the creation of the Atomic Energy Commission and, during the course of two tours of Allied battlefronts in Europe, she campaigned for more support of what she considered to be America's forgotten army in Italy. She was present at the liberation of several Nazi concentration camps in April 1945, and after V-E Day, she began warning against the rise of international Communism as another form of totalitarianism, likely to lead to World War III.

In 1946, she was the co-author of the Luce–Celler Act of 1946, which permitted Indians and Filipinos to immigrate to the US, introducing a quota of 100 immigrants from each country, and allowed them ultimately to become naturalized citizens. In the same year, she joined the board of directors of the American China Policy Association (ACPA). She served as its president in 1947.

Luce did not run for re-election in 1946.

=== Endorsements in the 1952 presidential election ===
Luce returned to politics during the 1952 presidential election.

Boothe led a group of women delegates to the 1952 Republican National Convention who sought to nominate Margaret Chase Smith in the balloting for the vice presidential nominee. Senator Smith, however, requested not to be considered for vice president. Noting that presidential nominee Dwight D. Eisenhower's supporters had coalesced around Richard Nixon for vice president, Luce withdrew her nomination of Smith.

During the general election, Boothe campaigned on behalf of the Eisenhower–Nixon ticket, giving more than 100 speeches on its behalf. Her anti-Communist speeches on the stump, radio, and television were effective in persuading a large number of traditionally Democratic-voting Catholics to switch parties and vote Eisenhower.

=== Ambassador to Italy ===
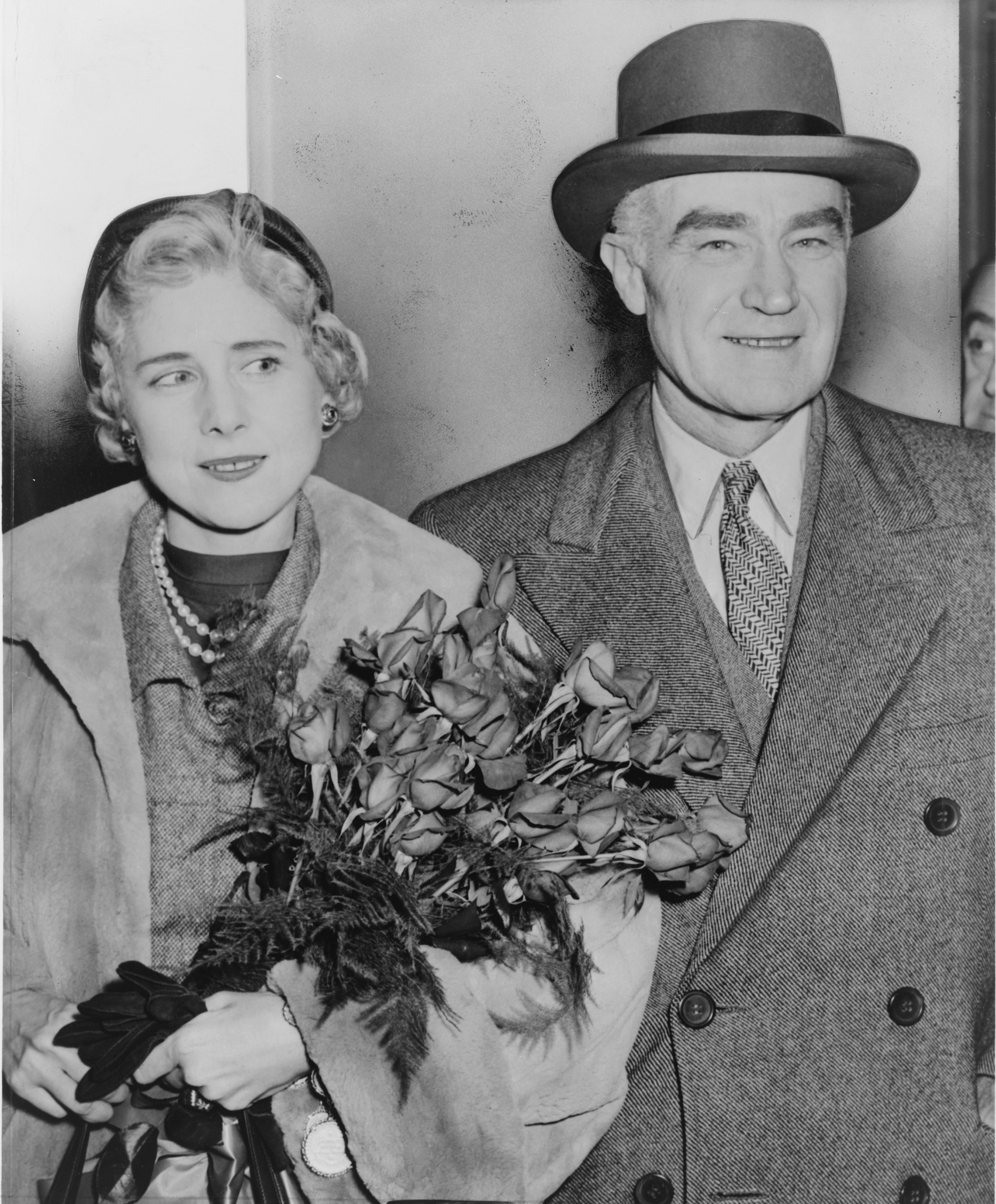
Clare Boothe Luce, ambassador to Italy, with husband Henry Luce (1954)

Eisenhower rewarded Luce for her contributions to his presidential campaign by appointing her as ambassador to Italy, a post that oversaw 1150 employees, 8 consulates, and 9 information centers. She was confirmed by the Senate in March 1953, the first American woman ever to hold such an important diplomatic post.

Italians reacted skeptically at first to the arrival of a female ambassador in Rome, but Luce soon convinced those of moderate and conservative temper that she favored their civilization and religion. "Her admirers in Italy – and she had millions – fondly referred to her as la Signora, 'the lady'." The country's large Communist minority, however, regarded her as a foreign meddler in Italian affairs. Luce was pictured with Monsignor William A. Hemmick, the first American canon of St. Peter's Basilica, in the biography of Hemmick, Patriot Priest.

She was no stranger to Pope Pius XII, who welcomed her as a friend and faithful acolyte. Over the course of several audiences since 1940, Luce had impressed Pius XII as one of the most effective secular preachers of Catholicism in America.

Her principal achievement as ambassador was to play a vital role in negotiating a peaceful solution to the Trieste Crisis of 1953–1954, a border dispute between Italy and Yugoslavia that she saw as potentially escalating into a war between East and West. Her sympathies throughout were with the Christian Democratic government of Giuseppe Pella, and she was influential on the Mediterranean policy of Secretary of State John Foster Dulles, another anticommunist. Although Luce regarded the abatement of the acute phase of the crisis in December 1953 as a triumph for herself, the main work of settlement, finalized in October 1954, was undertaken by professional representatives of the five concerned powers (Britain, France, the United States, Italy, and Yugoslavia) meeting in London.

As ambassador, Luce consistently overestimated the possibility that the Italian left would mount a governmental coup and turn the country communist unless the democratic center was buttressed with generous American aid. A United States Defense Department historical study declassified in 2016 revealed that during her time as ambassador, Luce oversaw a covert financial support program for centrist Italian governments aimed at weakening the Italian Communist Party's hold on labor unions.

Nurturing an image of her own country as a haven of social peace and prosperity, she threatened to boycott the 1955 Venice Film Festival if the American juvenile delinquent film Blackboard Jungle was shown. Around the same time, she fell seriously ill with arsenic poisoning. Sensational rumors circulated that the ambassador was the target of extermination by agents of the Soviet Union. Medical analysis eventually determined that the poisoning was caused by arsenate of lead in paint dust falling from the stucco that decorated her bedroom ceiling. The episode debilitated Luce physically and mentally, and she resigned her post in December 1956. Upon her departure, Rome's Il Tempo concluded "She has given a notable example of how well a woman can discharge a political post of grave responsibility."

In 1957, she was awarded the Laetare Medal by the University of Notre Dame, considered the most prestigious award for American Catholics. In the same year, Luce was appointed to a Rockefeller Foundation panel to formulate a vision of America foreign policy.

She was an appreciator of Italian haute couture and a frequent visitor and client of the ateliers Gattinoni, Ferdinandi, Schuberth, and Sorelle Fontana in Rome.

=== Ambassador to Brazil nomination ===
In April 1959, President Eisenhower nominated a recovered Luce to be the US Ambassador to Brazil. She began to learn enough of the Portuguese language in preparation for the job, but she was by now so conservative that her appointment met with strong opposition from a small number of Democratic senators. Leading the charge was Oregon Senator Wayne Morse. Still, Luce was confirmed by a 79 to 11 vote. Her husband urged her to decline the appointment, noting that it would be difficult for her to work with Morse, who chaired the Senate Subcommittee on Latin American Affairs. Luce eventually sent Eisenhower a letter explaining that she felt that the controversy surrounding her appointment would hinder her abilities to be respected by both her Brazilian and US coworkers. Thus, as she had never left American soil, she never officially took office as ambassador.

=== Political life after office ===
After Fidel Castro led a revolution in Cuba in 1959, Luce and her husband began to sponsor anticommunist groups. This support included funding Cuban exiles in commando speedboat raids against Cuba in the early 1960s. In 1963 the Freedom House-initiated organisation, Citizens Committee for a Free Cuba, was set up, which Luce was a member of. She called for U.S. government intervention Cuba, declaring in October 1962, just before the Cuban Missile Crisis, that "What is now at stake in the decision for intervention or non-intervention in Cuba is the question not only of American prestige but of American survival". Luce's continuing anticommunism as well as her advocacy of conservatism led her to support Senator Barry Goldwater of Arizona as the Republican candidate for president in 1964. She also considered but rejected a candidacy for the United States Senate from New York on the Conservative party ticket. That same year, which also saw the political emergence of future friend Ronald Reagan, marked the voluntary end of Henry Luce's tenure as editor-in-chief of Time. The Luces retired together, establishing a winter home in Arizona and planning a final move to Hawaii. Her husband, Henry, died in 1967 before that dream could be realized, but she went ahead with construction of a luxurious beach house in Honolulu, and, for some years, she led an active life in Hawaii high society.

In 1973, President Richard Nixon named her to the President's Foreign Intelligence Advisory Board (PFIAB). She remained on the board until President Jimmy Carter succeeded President Gerald Ford in 1977. In 1979, she was the first woman to be awarded the Sylvanus Thayer Award by the United States Military Academy at West Point. President Reagan reappointed Luce to PFIAB. She served on the board until 1983.

Luce sat on the board of the directors of the Association of Former Intelligence Officers, founded in 1975. She was involved with the Committee on the Present Danger, founded in 1976.

In 1986, Luce was the recipient of the Golden Plate Award of the American Academy of Achievement.

=== Presidential Medal of Freedom ===
President Reagan awarded her the Presidential Medal of Freedom in 1983. She was the first female member of Congress to receive this award.

Upon presenting her with the Presidential Medal of Freedom, Reagan said this of Luce:

A novelist, playwright, politician, diplomat, and advisor to Presidents, Clare Boothe Luce has served and enriched her country in many fields. Her brilliance of mind, gracious warmth and great fortitude have propelled her to exceptional heights of accomplishment. As a Congresswoman, Ambassador, and Member of the President's Foreign Intelligence Advisory Board, Clare Boothe Luce has been a persistent and effective advocate of freedom, both at home and abroad. She has earned the respect of people from all over the world, and the love of her fellow Americans.

== Death ==
Luce died of brain cancer on October 9, 1987, at age 84, at her Watergate apartment in Washington, D.C. She is buried at Mepkin Abbey, South Carolina, a plantation that she and Henry Luce had once owned and given to a community of Trappist monks. She lies in a grave adjoining her mother, daughter, and husband.

== Legacy ==
=== Conservatism ===
The Clare Boothe Luce Center for Conservative Women (The Luce Center) was founded in 1993 by Michelle Easton.The non-profit mentorship institution seeks to prepare and promote today's young conservative women leaders through internships, national student summits, campus speakers, and firearms training. The Luce Center has hosted numerous speakers at both college campuses and their headquarters.

The Clare Boothe Luce Award, established in 1991, is the Heritage Foundation's highest award for distinguished contributions to the conservative movement. Prominent recipients include Ronald Reagan, Margaret Thatcher, and William F. Buckley Jr.

=== Feminism ===
Revered in her later years as a heroine of the feminist movement, Luce had mixed feelings about the role of women in society. As a congresswoman in 1943, she was invited to co-sponsor a submission of the Equal Rights Amendment, offered by Representative Louis Ludlow of Indiana, but claimed that the invitation got lost in her mail. Luce never ceased to advise women to marry and provide supportive homes for their husbands. (During her ambassadorial years, at a dinner in Luxembourg attended by many European dignitaries, Luce was heard declaiming that all women wanted from men was "babies and security".)

Luce bequeathed a large part of her personal fortune of some $50 million to an academic program, the Clare Boothe Luce Program, designed to encourage the entry of women into technological fields traditionally dominated by men. In 2017, she was inducted into the National Women's Hall of Fame.

=== Clare Boothe Luce Program ===
Since 1989, the Clare Boothe Luce Program (CBLP) has become a source of private funding support for women in science, mathematics, and engineering.

== Publications ==
Plays

- 1935 Abide with Me
- 1936 The Women
- 1938 Kiss the Boys Goodbye
- 1939 Margin for Error
- 1951 Child of the Morning
- 1970 Slam the Door Softly

Screen Stories

- 1949 Come to the Stable

Books

- 1931 Stuffed Shirts
- 1940 Europe in the Spring
- 1952 Saints for Now (editor)

== See also ==
- List of notable brain tumor patients
- Women in the United States House of Representatives

== Notes ==
U.S. House of Representatives
Preceded by Le Roy D. Downs	Member of the U.S. House of Representatives from Connecticut's 4th congressional district 1943–1947	Succeeded by John D. Lodge
Diplomatic posts
Preceded by Ellsworth Bunker	United States Ambassador to Italy; 1953–1956	Succeeded by James David Zellerbach
Preceded by Ellis O. Briggs	United States Ambassador to Brazil; 1959–1959	Succeeded by John M. Cabot
