= Edward McNamara =

American actor (1884–1944)

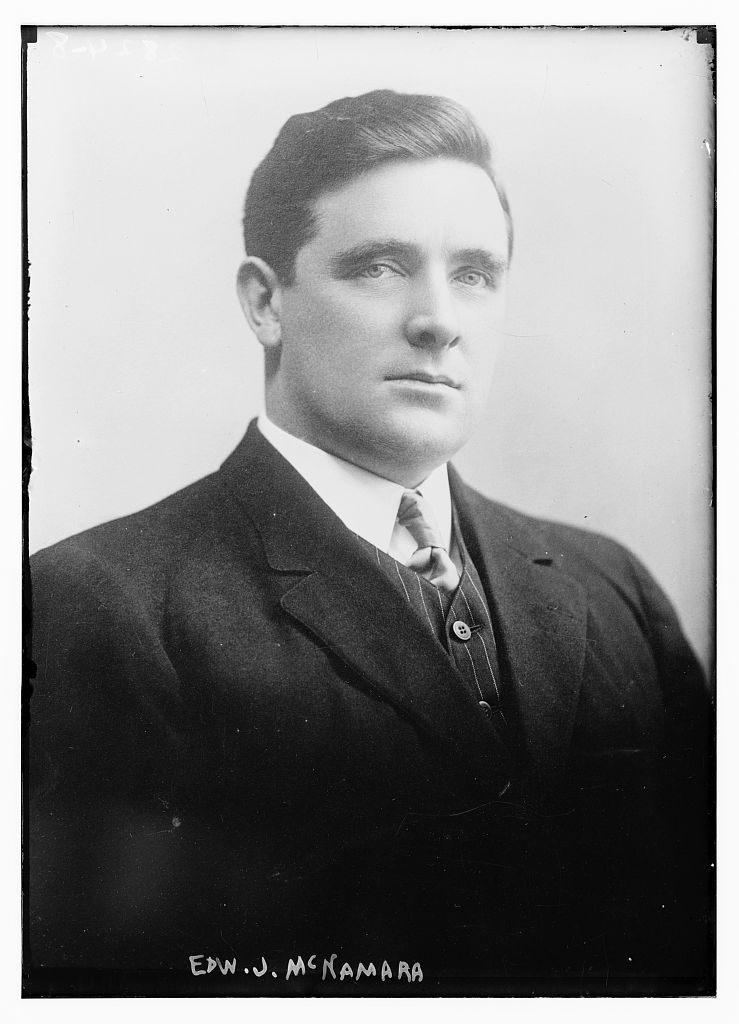
- McNamara in 1913
- Born: Edward James McNamara; August 13, 1884; Paterson, New Jersey, U.S.
- Died: November 10, 1944 (aged 60); Boston, Massachusetts, U.S.
- Resting place: West Tisbury Village Cemetery
- Occupation: Actor
- Years active: 1914–1944

Edward James McNamara (August 13, 1884 - November 10, 1944) was an American Broadway and Hollywood actor. He appeared in several films between 1929 and 1944.

== Early life ==
He was born on August 13, 1884, in Paterson, New Jersey. Rotund in build and with a booming baritone voice, he sang while a police officer in Paterson.

== Career ==
One day in 1914 he was overheard singing "il Pagliacci Prologue" at the Paterson May Festival by German singer Madame Schumann Heink, who lived nearby. She convinced him to seek a professional career in voice. She, along with friend William Hughes (U.S. senator), a United States senator for New Jersey, introduced him to Italian tenor Enrico Caruso. After hearing McNamara sing, Caruso called him "The most natural organ he had ever heard" and urged him to seek a professional teacher to help harness his raw vocal power and talent, to which McNamara responded, "Fine. What teacher?" Caruso replied, "Don't take a chance, I will teach you." Henceforth, McNamara became the only pupil of the world's most legendary voice. He toured the United States with Madame Schumann Heink for six years.

McNamara's Broadway career began in 1926, and his Hollywood career started in 1929. He appeared in 18 films in total, mostly appearing in very brief roles, often ironically as a cop or a "singing policeman", which was his somewhat publicly known nickname in the newspapers. He was a longtime dear friend and traveling companion of actor James Cagney, and Cagney was sure to give him bit parts in four of his films. McNamara was also an honorary member of the "Irish Mafia" boys club, a group of actors during the 1930s of Irish descent including Cagney, Pat O'Brien, Frank McHugh, Spencer Tracy, James Gleason and Allen Jenkins. McNamara never considered show business a career, but merely a way to earn some money and spend time with friends. Cagney later said, "McNamara could have been one of the Metropolitan Opera's greatest stars, had he started younger and given himself over to the task. He was the perfect example of someone who could have had it all, but didn't want to pay the price."

McNamara was a member since 1928 of the Dutch Treat Club and the Players, a high society social club for artists in Manhattan. In 1936, McNamara and friend, Players member and cartoonist Denys Wortman, were the driving forces that convinced Cagney to hide (and eventually move) to Martha's Vineyard, while avoiding Jack Warner during his many contract disputes.

== Death ==
Towards the end of his life, McNamara briefly returned to police work, while still dabbling in acting. He died in 1944 in Boston at the age of 60, after suffering a massive heart attack. He died aboard a train, while he was delivering five racehorses to Cagney in California. Cagney said on McNamara in his autobiography, Cagney on Cagney, "Although the best friend that was ever known, he never kept of good health of himself which always disappointed me deeply." Services were held on Martha's Vineyard at the Congregational Church at West Tisbury and was buried at West Tisbury Village Cemetery.

== Filmography ==
Year	Title	Role	Notes
1929	Lucky in Love	Tim O'More	
1932	I Am a Fugitive from a Chain Gang	Second Warden	Uncredited
1932	Silver Dollar	Pete - Senate Bartender	Uncredited
1932	20,000 Years in Sing Sing	Head Guard Richards	Uncredited
1936	Great Guy	Capt. Hanlon	
1937	Girl Overboard	Captain Murphy	
1937	The League of Frightened Men	Inspector Cramer	
1940	Kitty Foyle	Tim - Hotel Doorman	Uncredited
1941	The Strawberry Blonde	Big Joe	
1941	The Devil and Miss Jones	Police Sergeant	
1941	New York Town	Brody	
1942	Captains of the Clouds	Man Buying Dog Team	Uncredited
1942	My Gal Sal	Policeman	Uncredited
1942	The Gay Sisters	Policeman	Uncredited
1942	The Palm Beach Story	Officer in Penn Station	Uncredited
1943	Margin for Error	Police Capt. Mulrooney	Uncredited
1943	Johnny Come Lately	W.M. Dougherty	
1944	Arsenic and Old Lace	Police Sgt. Brophy	(final film role)
