= The Lawless Years =

American TV crime drama series (1959–1961)

- Genre: Crime drama
- Directed by: Allen H. Miner; James Neilson
- Starring: James Gregory; Robert Karnes; John Vivyan
- Theme music composer: Raoul Kraushaar; William Loose
- Country of origin: United States
- Original language: English
- No. of seasons: 3
- No. of episodes: 47

Production
- Producer: Jack Chertok
- Camera setup: Single-camera
- Running time: 25 mins.
- Production companies: Jack Chertok Television Productions; California National Productions

Original release
- Network: NBC
- Release: April 16, 1959 – September 22, 1961

The Lawless Years is an American crime drama series that aired on NBC from April 16, 1959, to September 22, 1961. The series is the first of its kind, set during the Roaring 20s, preceding The Untouchables by half a season.

== Premise ==
The series depicts the activities of real-life police detective Barney Ruditsky as he fights organized crime in New York City. Its original title was Ruditsky.

The show has "a certain claim to authenticity . . . in its meticulous attention to period detail" and in depicting actual cases on which Ruditsky worked. Unlike other police dramas of its time, The Lawless Years focuses more on character studies than on action.

== Cast ==
=== Main ===
- James Gregory as Barney Ruditsky
- Robert Karnes as Max
- John Dennis as Dutch Schultz
- Norman Alden as Lulu
- Brad Trumbull as Brody
- John Vivyan as Louis Buchalter
- Stanley Adams as Gurrah
- Carol Eve Rossen as Anna
- Paul Richards as Louis 'Louy' Kassoff
- Robert Ellenstein as Legs Diamond
- Henry Corden as Wavey Gordon
- Robert Sampson as Mad Dog Coll
- James Griffith as Jonathan Willis

=== Guest stars ===
- Fred Aldrich
- Tige Andrews
- George Brenlin
- Joe Brooks
- Robert Carricart
- Tommy Cook
- Gertrude Flynn
- Clegg Hoyt
- Jess Kirkpatrick
- Lou Krugman
- Martin Landau
- Ruta Lee
- Dayton Lummis
- Ken Lynch
- Jenny Maxwell
- Ken Mayer
- Joseph Mell
- Frank Mills
- Vic Morrow
- Warren Oates
- James Parnell
- Joseph V. Perry
- Joe Ploski
- Judson Pratt
- Thano Rama
- Burt Reynolds
- Stephen Roberts
- Robert Sampson
- Cosmo Sardo
- Frank J. Scannell
- Alfred Shelly
- Joan Staley
- Harry Dean Stanton
- Barbara Stuart
- Brick Sullivan
- William Swan
- Nita Talbot
- Charles Wagenheim
- Max Wagner
- Jack Weston

== Episodes ==
=== Season 1 ===
No. overall	No. in season	Title	Directed by	Written by	Original release date
1	1	"The Nick Joseph Story (pilot)"	Allen H. Miner	Jo Eisinger	April 16, 1959
2	2	"The Immigrant"	Allen H. Miner	Jo Eisinger	April 23, 1959
3	3	"The Jane Cooper Story"	Allen H. Miner	Peggy O'Shea & Lou Shaw	April 30, 1959
4	4	"The Cutie Jaffe Story"	Allen H. Miner	Allen H. Miner; Based on the Memoirs of: Barney Ruditsky	May 7, 1959
5	5	"The Dutch Schultz Story"	Allen H. Miner	Jo Eisinger; Based on the Memoirs of: Barney Ruditsky	May 14, 1959
6	6	"The Lion and the Mouse"	Allen H. Miner	Allen H. Miner & Arthur E. Orloff	May 21, 1959
7	7	"No Fare"	Allen H. Miner	John Meredyth Lucas	May 28, 1959
8	8	"The Payoff"	Allen H. Miner	John Meredyth Lucas; Based on the Memoirs of: Barney Ruditsky	June 11, 1959
9	9	"The Marie Walters Story"	Allen H. Miner	Jo Eisinger	June 18, 1959
10	10	"The Maxie Gorman Story"	Allen H. Miner	Jo Eisinger	June 25, 1959
11	11	"The Muddy Kasoff Story"	Allen H. Miner	Jo Eisinger	July 2, 1959
12	12	"Framed"	Allen H. Miner	Allen H. Miner; Based on the Memoirs of: Barney Ruditsky	July 16, 1959
13	13	"Four the Hard Way"	Allen H. Miner	Allen H. Miner	July 23, 1959
14	14	"The Tony Morelli Story"	Allen H. Miner	Peggy O'Shea & Lou Shaw	July 30, 1959
15	15	"The Ray Baker Story"	Allen H. Miner	Charles Larson	August 6, 1959
16	16	"Lucky Silva"	Allen H. Miner	John Meredyth Lucas & Allen H. Miner; Based on the Memoirs of: Barney Ruditsky	August 13, 1959
17	17	"The Morrison Story"	Allen H. Miner	Jo Eisinger; Based on the Memoirs of: Barney Ruditsky	August 20, 1959
18	18	"The Poison Ivy Story"	Allen H. Miner	Allen H. Miner; Based on the Memoirs of: Barney Ruditsky	August 27, 1959
19	19	"The Prantera Story"	Allen H. Miner	Charles Larson; Based on the Memoirs of: Barney Ruditsky	September 3, 1959

=== Season 2 ===
No. overall	No. in season	Title	Original release date
20	1	"The Al Brown Story"	October 1, 1959
21	2	"The Big Greeny Story"	October 8, 1959
22	3	"The Art Harris Story"	October 15, 1959
23	4	"The Billy Boy 'Rockabye' Creel Story"	November 5, 1959
24	5	"The Big Man"	November 12, 1959
25	6	"The Joe Angelo Story"	November 19, 1959
26	7	"The Billy Grimes Story"	December 3, 1959
27	8	"The Sonny Rosen Story"	December 17, 1959

=== Season 3 ===
No. overall	No. in season	Title	Original release date
28	1	"The Jack 'Legs' Diamond Story"	May 12, 1961
29	2	"The Sonny Rosen Story II"	May 19, 1961
30	3	"Louy K, part one"	May 26, 1961
31	4	"Louy K, part two: 'Sing Sing'"	June 2, 1961
32	5	"Louy K, part three: 'Birth of the Organization'"	June 9, 1961
33	6	"Louy K, part four: 'Heyday of the Organization'"	June 16, 1961
34	7	"Louy K, part five: 'The Disintegration'"	June 23, 1961
35	8	"The Miles Miller Story"	June 30, 1961
36	9	"The Kid Dropper Story"	July 7, 1961
37	10	"Ginny"	July 14, 1961
38	11	"Little Augie"	July 21, 1961
39	12	"The 'Mad Dog' Coll Story, part one"	July 28, 1961
40	13	"The 'Mad Dog' Coll Story, part two"	August 4, 1961
41	14	"Blood Brothers"	August 11, 1961
42	15	"The Vincent Gorida Story"	August 18, 1961
43	16	"Artie Moon"	August 25, 1961
44	17	"Triple Cross"	September 1, 1961
45	18	"The Jonathan Wills Story"	September 8, 1961
46	19	"Romeo and Rose"	September 15, 1961
47	20	"Ike, the Novelty King"	September 22, 1961

== Production ==
Jack Chertok was the producer. The real Ruditsky served as technical advisor. California National Productions produced the series.

The series was broadcast initially from 8 to 8:30 p.m. Eastern Time on Thursdays. In July 1959 it moved to 8:30-9 p.m. ET on Thursdays, and in October 1959 it moved to 10:30-11 p.m. ET on Thursdays. When it returned in May 1961, it was on from 9 to 9:30 p.m. ET on Fridays.

== Seeking sponsors ==
Episodes' content made finding a sponsor difficult. The series began with no sponsor because the premiere episode had one gangster killing another criminal "by plunging an ice pick into a vital spot." Before that development, the trade publication Variety reported that Philip Morris was the "hottest prospect" to take on the series to advertise its Parliament and Marlboro cigarette brands. Variety added that cigarette company P. Lorillard was also "in there pitching for the story" as a potential co-sponsor with Whitehall Pharmacal.

A week after that article appeared, Variety reported that NBC was offering sponsorship of The Lawless Years for a "special introductory price". The $25,000-per-episode rate was "approximately $20,000 below the actual production cost of each episode." The reduced rate was to be good until the fall season began, at which time the network hoped to increase the per-episode charge to $45,000.

Midas Muffler Company became a sponsor in July 1959, "making its first major buy in network video" as it agreed to sponsor segments of The Lawless Years for July through September.

== Critical response ==
Critic John Crosby praised the look of the program: "the series is beautifully filmed and the settings and costumes and all the outer trimmings are marvelously authentic . . . they comprise a large part of the charm of The Lawless Years." He added that the show's plots were secondary in importance to the 1920s-era settings.

Newspaper journalist Hal Humphrey wrote, "The opening chapters in Ruditsky's hoodlum-infested underworld made gripping drama."
