= Brokaw (disambiguation) =

Brokaw is a surname.

Brokaw may also refer to:

- Brokaw, Wisconsin a village in Marathon County, Wisconsin
- Brokaw Bullet, a two-seat sports airplane designed in the United States for amateur construction

== See also ==
- Brokaw-McDougall House a historic mansion in Tallahassee, Florida Built in 1856
- Brokaw Site a location off of U.S. Route 40 in Richland Township west of St. Clairsville, Ohio
- Brokaw bandgap reference, a voltage reference circuit widely used in integrated circuits, with an output voltage around 1.25 V
