= Brokaw =

Brokaw is a surname. Notable people with the surname include:

- Ann Clare Brokaw (1924–1944), the only child of Clare Boothe Luce and George Tuttle Brokaw
- Charles Brokaw, author of the Thomas Lourds book series
- Chris Brokaw (born 1964), American musician, mostly known for his work with the bands Come and Codeine
- Gary Brokaw (born 1954), retired American basketball player and a basketball coach
- George Tuttle Brokaw (1879–1935), American lawyer and sportsman
- Irving Brokaw (1871–1939), American figure skater, artist, lawyer, and financier
- Isaac Brokaw (1746–1826), New Jersey clockmaker
- Isaac Vail Brokaw (1835–1913), New York City clothing merchant
- Mark Brokaw (died 2025), American stage director
- Norman Brokaw (1927–2016), American talent agent
- Paul Brokaw, expert on integrated circuit design
- Tom Brokaw (born 1940), American television journalist and author notable for hosting NBC Nightly News
