= Isaac Vail Brokaw =

American clothing merchant (1835-1913)

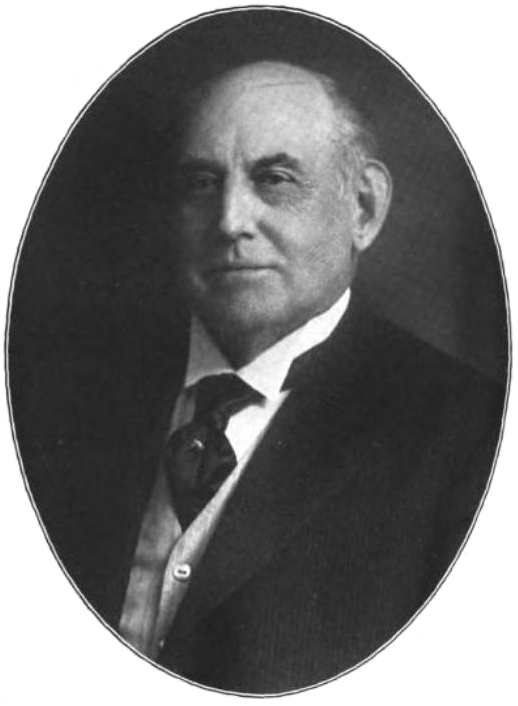
- Born: November 27, 1835; Plainfield, New Jersey, US
- Died: September 29, 1913 (aged 77); Elberon, New Jersey, US
- Political party: Republican
- Spouse: Elvira Tuttle Gould (m. 1860)
- Children: 7, including George and Irving Brokaw

Isaac Vail Brokaw (November 27, 1835 – September 29, 1913) was a pioneer New York City clothing merchant who headed Brokaw Brothers.

== Early life ==
He was born on November 27, 1835, in Plainfield, New Jersey, to Simeon Brokaw (1792–1854) and Prudence Vail (1795–1887). His siblings included Jemima Vail Brokaw (1824–1838) and William Vail Brokaw (1831–1907).

His paternal grandparents were Isaac Brokaw (1759–1838), who fought in the American Revolution, and Maria (née Van Nortwick) Brokaw (1759–1826). His mother's side of the family were the Vail Quakers of New Jersey. He was descended from Bourgeon Broucard, a French Huguenot who settled on Long Island in 1675 and founded the first French Protestant church in New York.

== Career ==
Brokaw went into business with the cloth importing firm of Wilson G. Hunt & Co. In 1856, Brokaw organized a clothing firm with his brother which they called Brokaw Brothers. The business sold:

Boys' and children's outfits in every style; men's garments of all kinds, adapted to all seasons, load the long counters and the immediate shelves of this extensive establishment. Each season finds them changing their make and style to suite the various wants of the time, and nothing which the most fashionable custom houses in the City produce is wanting to the stock of Brokaw Brothers.

Brokaw was a Republican in politics, though he never held office. He was a member of the Union League Club and the Huguenot Society.

After Brokaw's death in 1913, his son Howard became president and head of the clothing firm.

=== Residence ===
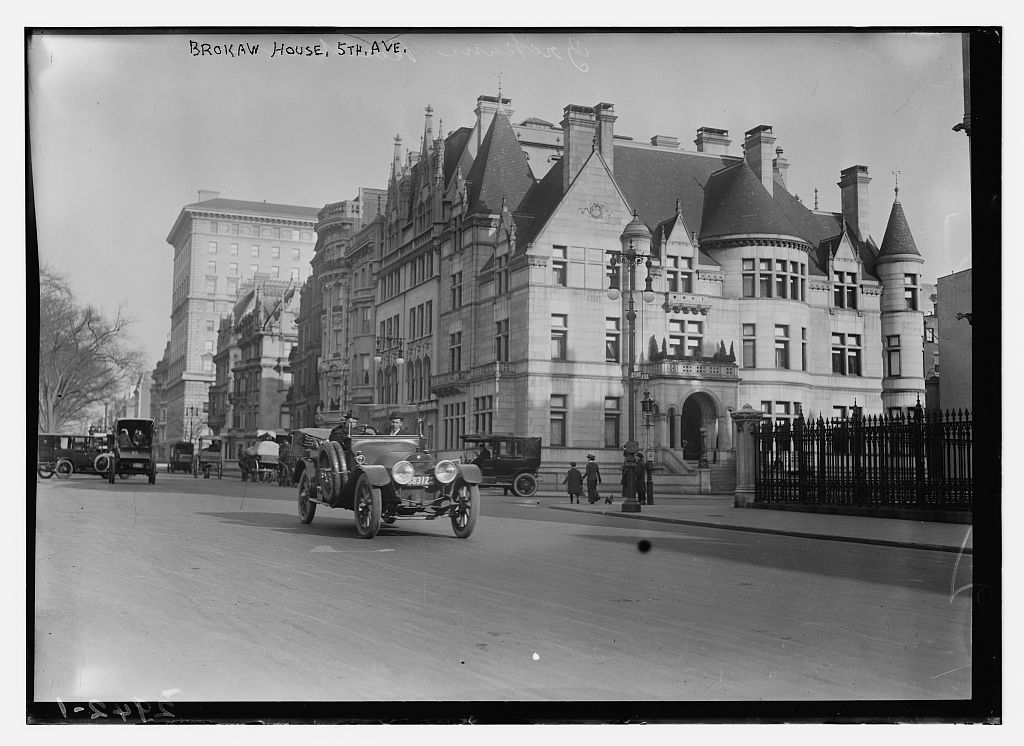
Brokaw home on 5th Avenue

In 1887, Brokaw hired Rose & Stone to build a mansion for him at Fifth Avenue and 79th Street. The grand and imposing mansion was completed in 1891.

In 1905, Brokaw built twin Gothic style adjoining houses at 984 and 985 5th Avenue, designed by Charles Frederic Rose, for Howard and Irving. Henry Mandel attempted to purchase the homes in 1940. The land where the properties were was bought by Bernard Spitzer in 1968.

In 1911, Brokaw built 7 East 79th Street for his daughter, Elvira, designed by Harold Van Buren Magonigle.

After his death, his wife and youngest son, George, lived in the mansion. After his wedding in 1923 to Clare Boothe, they lived in the house together. After his mother's death in 1926, George filed a lawsuit requesting permission to tear down the mansion and erect an apartment house. He also asked that his brothers, Irving and Howard, who opposed the demolition plans, be prevented from interfering with the new building. George won his suit and in November of the same year and filed plans for the construction of a 13‐story building. The Supreme Court, however, reversed its decision on appeal and the plans were dropped. Again in 1928, George sued for permission to tear down the mansion, but lost on grounds that his father's will would be violated.

After George's death in 1935, his daughter inherited half of the house. After the daughter's death in an automobile accident, George's ex-wife, Clare, sold her share to her then husband, Henry Luce. After being designated a landmark by the City of New York, Brokaw's home was torn down in 1964.

=== Philanthropy ===
Following the death of his eldest son, Frederick, in 1891, Brokaw paid for The Brokaw Memorial at Princeton University, in memory of his son's tragic death. The $42,000 gift, made in 1892, was for a memorial athletic grounds. The building was completed and in use by 1896.

In 1893, he donated $50,000 to the Madison Avenue Reformed Church, on the corner of Madison Avenue and Fifty-Seventh Street, so they could build a missionary building. Abbott Eliot Kittredge, then pastor of the Church, was in charge of raising funds to purchase land where the missionary could be built upon.

== Personal life ==
On November 14, 1860, he married Elvira Tuttle Gould (1840–1926), the daughter of Joseph Paxton Gould (1804–1880) and Eloise Elvira Tuttle (1808–1860), in Newark, New Jersey. Her brother was George Tuttle Gould (1837–1906). Together, they were the parents of:

- Frederick Vail Brokaw (1866–1891), a student at Princeton who drowned while trying save a girl.
- Grace Elvira Brokaw (1867–1868), who died young.
- Isaac Irving Brokaw (1871–1939), a noted skater who was married to Lucile Nave (d. 1937).
- Elvira Brokaw (1872–1958), who married Carl Aage Vilhelm Frederick von Fischer-Hansen (1868–1950), a Danish nobleman, in 1896. They divorced in 1911, and in 1914, she married William McNair (1871-1947), also an attorney.
- Howard Crosby Brokaw (1875–1960), who married Edna Goadby Loew (1882–1960) in 1903. They had three daughters.
- Ernest Brokaw (1879–1881), who also died young.
- George Tuttle Brokaw (1879–1935), who married Clare Boothe (1903–1987), in 1923. They divorced in 1929. In 1931, he married Frances Ford Seymour (1908–1950).

He died in Elberon, New Jersey, on September 29, 1913. The Brokaw estate, which was left in a Trust, was valued at $12,318,569 (about $360 million in 2025 dollars) after his death. The entire estate was left to his wife and living children.

=== Descendants ===
Through his son Irving, he was the grandfather of Lucile Brokaw, who married James Duane Pell Bishop, a grandson of Heber R. Bishop, in 1936, Barbara Lucile Brokaw, who married Leonard Jarvis Cushing, and Louise Elvira "Mimi" Brokaw, who married painter Richard Derby Tucker.

Through his daughter Elvira, he was the grandfather of Elvira McNair (1900–1965), who was married to Reginald Lovett Hutchinson (1895–1954) in 1922. They divorced in 1925, and she married William Samuel Fairchild (1892-1940), son of Samuel W. Fairchild. After Fairchild's death in 1940, she married Vicomte Jacques de Sibour (1896–1979), the nephew of Jules Henri de Sibour, in 1949. De Sibour had previously been married to Violette Selfridge, daughter of Harry Gordon Selfridge, with whom he had a son, Jacques de Sibour, Jr. (1928–2005) before their divorce in 1949.

Through his son George and daughter-in-law Clare Boothe Luce, he was the grandfather of Ann Clare Brokaw (1924–1944), who was killed in an automobile accident while a senior at Stanford University, and Frances de Villers "Pan" Brokaw (1931–2008), a half-sister of Jane and Peter Fonda, who later married Francesco Corrias, and became a painter.
