= Don Gregory =

Broadway producer

- Born: Donald Ginsberg; December 3, 1934; Bronx, New York, US
- Died: November 5, 2015 (aged 80); Boca Raton, Florida, US
- Occupation: Theater producer
- Spouse(s): Carolyn Fitzpatrick (divorced); Kaye Romine
- Children: with Fitzpatrick: --David Gregory --Stephanie Gregory Mitchell

Don Gregory (December 3, 1934 – November 5, 2015) was an American Broadway producer.

== Biography ==
Gregory was born Donald Ginsberg to a Jewish family in the Bronx on December 3, 1934, the son of Dorothy (née Sheffrin) and Morris Ginsberg. When he was four years old, his father died and his mother remarried and moved the family to Norwich, Connecticut. He attended the University of Connecticut but left before graduating and moved to California to become an actor. He changed his name so it sounded less "ethnic." In the 1950s, he joined the U.S. Army and after he completed his service, he moved back to New York City where he worked as a talent agent.

In the 1970s, leveraging his pool of clients and connections, he began to produce solo-performer shows that matched a celebrated actor with a celebrated historical personage. They included: Clarence Darrow by David W. Rintels and starring Henry Fonda as Clarence Darrow; and The Belle of Amherst by William Luce starring Julie Harris as Emily Dickinson. In 1980, he paired Richard Burton as King Arthur in Camelot. In 1981, he paired Rex Harrison as Henry Higgins in My Fair Lady; and Richard Harris in a return engagement in Camelot. In 1983, he co-produced Othello with James Earl Jones in the title role and Christopher Plummer as Iago. He also produced Paul Robeson starring James Earl Jones. His other Broadway credits include the 1981 musical Copperfield; Buttons on Broadway with Red Buttons in 1995; and a 2012 revival of the comedy Harvey written by Mary Chase starring Jim Parsons. Off-Broadway credits include Dore Schary's play FDR with Robert Vaughn as Franklin Delano Roosevelt; a revival of The Belle of Amherst starring Joely Richardson; and Nobody Don't Like Yogi, by Tom Lysaght with Ben Gazzara as Yogi Berra.

== Personal life ==
Gregory was married twice. His first wife was Carolyn Fitzpatrick, an Irish Catholic. They had two children: television journalist David Gregory and Stephanie Gregory Mitchell; they later divorced and she remarried (now Carolyn Surtees). In 1981, he remarried to Kaye Romine. He died of a stroke at his home in Boca Raton, Florida on November 5, 2015.
