= Clarence Darrow (film) =

- Genre: Biography; Drama
- Based on: Clarence Darrow for the Defense by Irving Stone
- Written by: David W. Rintels
- Directed by: John Rich
- Starring: Henry Fonda
- Country of origin: United States
- Original language: English

Production
- Producers: Don Gregory; Mike Merrick
- Editors: Ken Baker; Hal Collins; Frank Phillips
- Running time: 81 minutes
- Production company: Dome Productions

Original release
- Network: NBC
- Release: September 4, 1974

Clarence Darrow is a 1974 videotaped television production of a one-person play directed by John Rich, written by David W. Rintels and produced by Don Gregory and Mike Merrick. Henry Fonda portrayed the celebrated defense lawyer Clarence Darrow.
