= Afdera Franchetti =

Italian baroness (1931–2025)

Afdera Franchetti (8 July 1931 – 20 March 2025) was an Italian baroness. Franchetti was the fourth wife of American actor Henry Fonda.

== Background and family ==
The Italian Jewish Franchetti family, from the 18th century, was one of the wealthiest families in the Mediterranean. Afdera Franchetti was the daughter of Baron Raimondo Franchetti, a famous explorer who travelled extensively in Ethiopia and charted hitherto unexplored territories (Dancalia) during the 1920s. On his return from an expedition to Ethiopia, his plane exploded over Cairo in 1935. Raimondo's grandmother was Sara Louise de Rothschild. Her brother, the Baron Raimondo Nanuk Franchetti, was a friend of author Ernest Hemingway, who hunted with him in Caorle Lagoon.

The Franchetti siblings were named Nanuk, Afdera, Lorian and Simba; the last died early of tuberculosis.

== Personal life and death ==
Franchetti claims to have attended the masked ball at Palazzo Labia in 1951, as well as the ball of Baron de Redé at his palace Hôtel Lambert on Île Saint-Louis, Paris. She attended also the famous "Ball of the Kings" at Palazzo Serra di Cassano in 1960 and in one of her last interview to writer and form fashion editor Demetrio Baffa Trasci Amalfitani she said "[...] high society would never again be as seductive as it was [....]" that night.

Franchetti was married to Howard Taylor from 1954 to 1957. They met in Italy on a vacation.

Franchetti was then married to Henry Fonda (1905–1982) from 1957 to 1961. They were introduced to each other by Audrey Hepburn in Italy while he was filming War and Peace with Hepburn and Mel Ferrer. Hepburn had been struggling with infertility and had sought advice from Franchetti's sister, Simba. When she became pregnant straightaway, she felt a certain loyalty to the Franchetti family. She befriended Franchetti, which resulted in her meeting with Fonda. He was 48 and she, 22, when they met. Franchetti was roughly 25 years old when she married Fonda; his eldest child, Jane, was 18 years old. On reflection she says of her time with Fonda: "Look, I was spoiled. You see, I didn’t realize how lucky I was." Her affections were taken by Henry Cubitt, 4th Baron Ashcombe and she left Fonda.

She was a friend to Truman Capote, acquaintance of John F. and Jackie Kennedy and says of Warren Beatty that "He smelled of honey and like Lady Chatterley with her lover, he was the sort of man whose body you wanted to cover in daisy chains."

Franchetti wrote her memoirs, Never Before Midday, for publisher George Weidenfeld.

Afdera Franchetti died in Milan on 20 March 2025, at the age of 93.
