= Henry Fonda =

American actor (1905–1982)

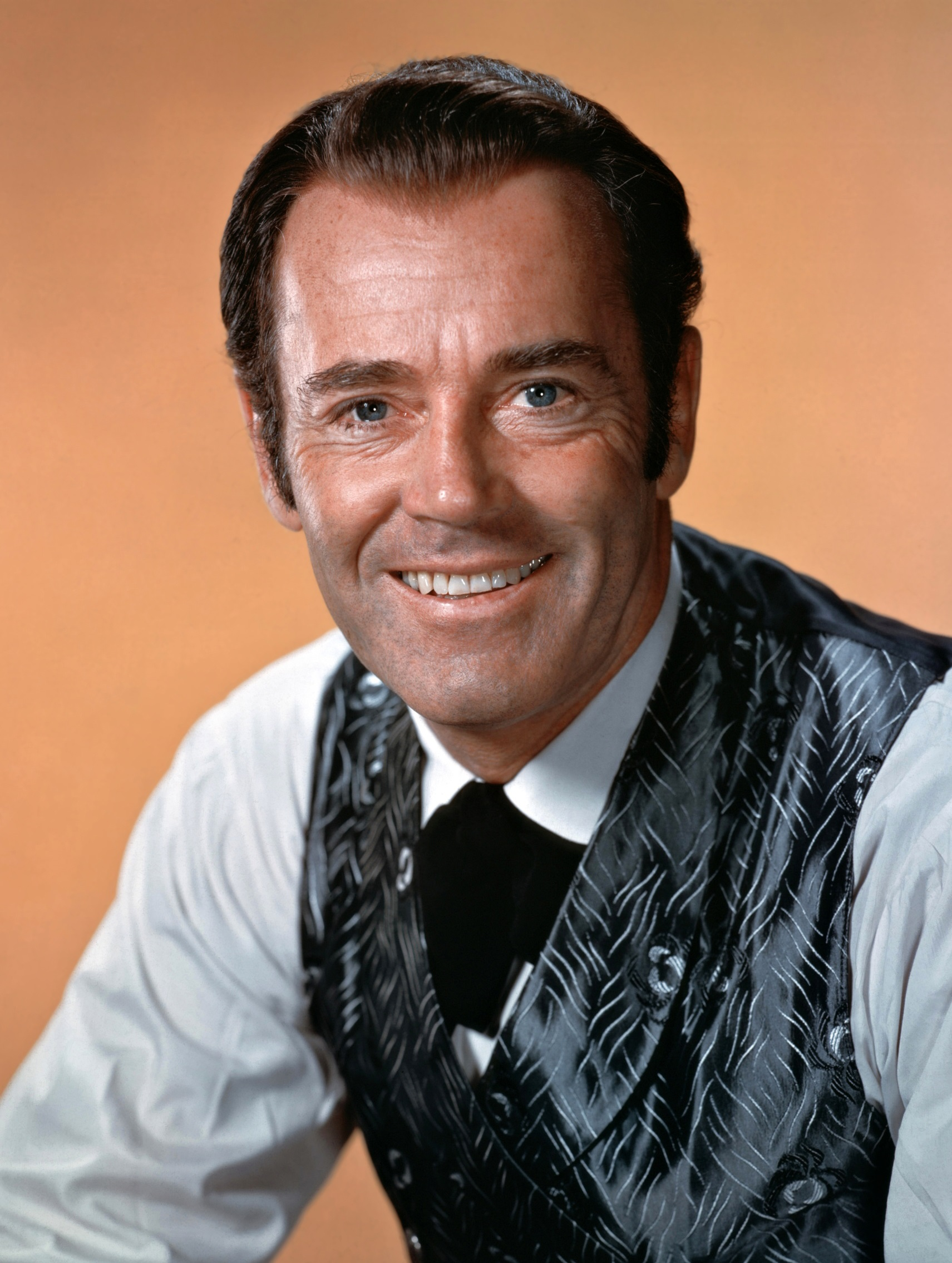
- Fonda in Warlock (1959)
- Born: Henry Jaynes Fonda; May 16, 1905; Grand Island, Nebraska, U.S.
- Died: August 12, 1982 (aged 77); Los Angeles, California, U.S.
- Education: University of Minnesota
- Occupation: Actor
- Years active: 1925–1981
- Political party: Democratic
- Spouses: Margaret Sullavan (m. 1931; div. 1933) Frances Ford Seymour (m. 1936; died 1950) Susan Blanchard (m. 1950; div. 1956) Afdera Franchetti (m. 1957; div. 1961) Shirlee Mae Adams (m. 1965)
- Children: 3, including Jane and Peter
- Relatives: Bridget Fonda (granddaughter); Troy Garity (grandson)
- Military career
- Allegiance: United States
- Branch: United States Navy
- Service years: 1942–1945
- Rank: Lieutenant
- Unit: Air Combat Intelligence
- Conflicts: World War II; Pacific War; Mariana and Palau Islands campaign; Truk Lagoon; Battle of Iwo Jima
- Awards: Bronze Star; Presidential Unit Citation

Henry Jaynes Fonda (May 16, 1905 – August 12, 1982) was an American actor whose career spanned five decades on Broadway and in Hollywood. Known for his work on screen and stage, he often portrayed characters who embodied an everyman image.

Born and raised in Nebraska, Fonda made his mark early as a Broadway actor and made his Hollywood film debut in 1935. He rose to film stardom with performances in films such as Jezebel (1938), Jesse James (1939) and Young Mr. Lincoln (1939). He received a nomination for the Academy Award for Best Actor for his role as Tom Joad in The Grapes of Wrath (1940).

In 1941, Fonda starred opposite Barbara Stanwyck in the screwball comedy classic The Lady Eve. After his service in World War II, he starred in two highly regarded Westerns: The Ox-Bow Incident (1943) and My Darling Clementine (1946), the latter directed by John Ford. He also starred in Ford's Western Fort Apache (1948). During a seven-year break from films, Fonda focused on stage productions, returning to star in the war-boat ensemble movie Mister Roberts in 1955, a role he championed on Broadway. In 1956, at the age of 51, Fonda played the title role of 38-year-old Manny Balestrero in Alfred Hitchcock's thriller The Wrong Man. In 1957, Fonda starred as Juror 8, the hold-out juror, in 12 Angry Men, a film he co-produced and that earned him a BAFTA award for Best Foreign Actor.

Later in his career, Fonda played a range of characters, including a villain in the epic Once Upon a Time in the West (1968) and the lead in the romantic comedy Yours, Mine and Ours with Lucille Ball. He also portrayed military figures, such as a colonel in Battle of the Bulge (1965) and Admiral Nimitz in Midway (1976).

Fonda won the Academy Award for Best Actor at the 54th Academy Awards for his final film role in On Golden Pond (1981), which co-starred Katharine Hepburn and his daughter Jane Fonda. He was too ill to attend the ceremony and died from heart disease five months later.

Fonda was the patriarch of a family of actors, including daughter Jane Fonda, son Peter Fonda, granddaughter Bridget Fonda and grandson Troy Garity. In 1999, he was named the sixth-Greatest Male Screen Legend of the Classic Hollywood Era (stars with a film debut by 1950) by the American Film Institute.

== Ancestry and early life ==
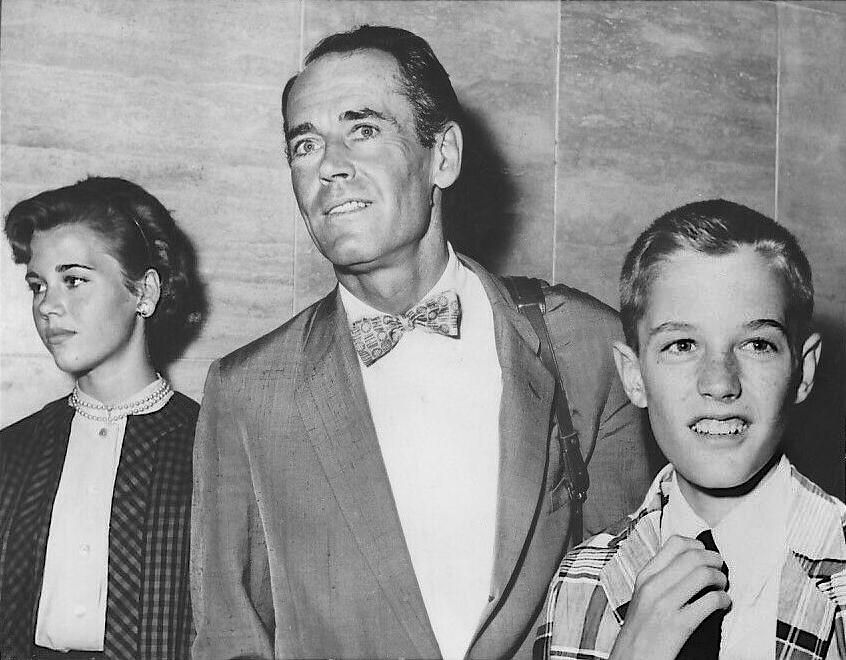
Jane Fonda, Henry Fonda, and Peter Fonda in July 1955

Born in Grand Island, Nebraska, on May 16, 1905, Henry Jaynes Fonda was the son of printer William Brace Fonda, and his wife, Herberta (Jaynes). The family moved to Omaha, Nebraska, in 1906.

Fonda's patriline originates with an ancestor from Genoa, Italy, who migrated to the Netherlands in the 15th century. In 1642, a branch of the Fonda family immigrated to the Dutch colony of New Netherland on the East Coast of North America. They were among the first Dutch population to settle in what is now upstate New York, establishing the town of Fonda, New York. By 1888, many of their descendants had relocated to Nebraska.

Fonda was brought up as a Christian Scientist. The family was close and highly supportive, especially in health matters, as they avoided doctors due to their religion. Despite having a religious background, he later became an agnostic. Fonda was a bashful, short boy who tended to avoid girls, except his sisters, and was a good skater, swimmer, and runner. He worked part-time in his father's print plant and imagined a possible career as a journalist. Later, he worked after school for the phone company. He also enjoyed drawing. Fonda was active in the Boy Scouts of America; Howard Teichmann's biography of Fonda, as well as his son Peter Fonda, stated that he reached the rank of Eagle Scout. However, other sources contradict that claim, some stating that he was instead a ScoutMaster.

When he was 14, he and his father witnessed the brutal lynching of Will Brown from a nearby building during the Omaha race riot of 1919. This enraged the young Fonda and he kept a keen awareness of prejudice for the rest of his life. Remarking on the incident in a 1975 BBC interview, he said: "It was the most horrendous sight I'd ever seen. My hands were wet, there were tears in my eyes. All I could think of was that young black man dangling at the end of a rope." By his senior year in high school, Fonda had grown to more than 6 feet (183 cm) tall, but remained shy. He attended the University of Minnesota, where he majored in journalism, but did not graduate. While at Minnesota he was a member of Chi Delta Xi, a local fraternity, which later became Chi Phi's Gamma Delta chapter on that campus. He took a job with the Retail Credit Company.

== Career ==
=== Early stage work ===
At age 20, Fonda started his acting career at the Omaha Community Playhouse when his mother's friend Dodie Brando (mother of Marlon Brando) recommended that he try out for a juvenile part in You and I, in which he was cast as Ricky. He was fascinated by the stage, learning everything from set construction to stage production, and embarrassed by his acting ability. When he received the lead in Merton of the Movies, he realized the beauty of acting as a profession, as it allowed him to deflect attention from his own tongue-tied personality and create stage characters relying on someone else's scripted words. Fonda decided to quit his job and go east in 1928 to seek his fortune.

He arrived on Cape Cod and played a minor role at the Cape Playhouse in Dennis, Massachusetts. A friend took him to Falmouth, MA where he joined and quickly became a valued member of the University Players, an intercollegiate summer stock company. There, he worked with Margaret Sullavan, his future wife. James Stewart joined the Players a few months after Fonda left, though they were soon to become lifelong friends. Fonda left the Players at the end of their 1931–1932 season after appearing in his first professional role in The Jest, by Sem Benelli. Joshua Logan, a young sophomore at Princeton who had been double-cast in the show, gave Fonda the part of Tornaquinci, "an elderly Italian man with a long white beard and even longer hair." Also in the cast of The Jest with Fonda and Logan were Bretaigne Windust, Kent Smith, and Eleanor Phelps.

Soon after, Fonda headed for New York City to be with his then wife, Margaret Sullavan. The marriage was brief, but when James Stewart came to New York his luck changed. Getting contact information from Joshua Logan, "Jimmy" and "Hank" found they had a lot in common, as long as they didn't discuss politics. The two men became roommates and honed their skills on Broadway. Fonda appeared in theatrical productions from 1926 to 1934. They fared no better than many Americans in and out of work during the early part of the Great Depression, sometimes lacking enough money to take the subway.

=== Entering Hollywood ===
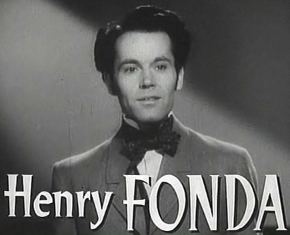
Fonda in Jezebel

Fonda's first break in films when he was hired in 1935 as Janet Gaynor's leading man in 20th Century Fox's screen adaptation of The Farmer Takes a Wife; he reprised his role from the Broadway production of the same name, which had gained him recognition. Suddenly, Fonda was making $3,000 a week (equivalent to $70,000 in 2025) and dining with Hollywood stars such as Carole Lombard. Stewart soon followed him to Hollywood, and they roomed together again, in lodgings next door to Greta Garbo. In 1935 Fonda starred in the RKO film I Dream Too Much with the opera star Lily Pons. The New York Times announced him as "Henry Fonda, the most likable of the new crop of romantic juveniles." Fonda's film career blossomed as he costarred with Sylvia Sidney and Fred MacMurray in The Trail of the Lonesome Pine (1936), the first Technicolor movie filmed outdoors.

Fonda starred with ex-wife Margaret Sullavan in The Moon's Our Home, and a short rekindling of their relationship led to a brief but temporary consideration of remarriage. Fonda got the nod for the lead role in You Only Live Once (1937), also costarring Sidney, and directed by Fritz Lang. He starred opposite Bette Davis, who had chosen him, in the film Jezebel (1938). This was followed by the title role in Young Mr. Lincoln (1939), his first collaboration with director John Ford, and that year he played Frank James in Jesse James (1939) starring Tyrone Power and Nancy Kelly. Another 1939 film was Drums Along the Mohawk, also directed by Ford.

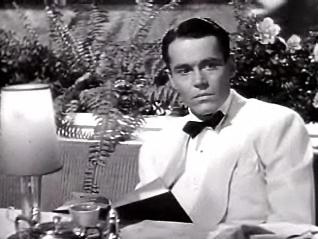
Fonda in The Lady Eve

Fonda's successes led Ford to recruit him to play Tom Joad in the film version of John Steinbeck's novel The Grapes of Wrath (1940). A reluctant Darryl Zanuck, who preferred Tyrone Power, insisted on Fonda's signing a seven-year contract with his studio, Twentieth Century-Fox. Fonda agreed and was ultimately nominated for an Academy Award for his work in the film, which many consider to be his finest role. Fonda starred in Fritz Lang's The Return of Frank James (1940) with Gene Tierney. He then played opposite Barbara Stanwyck in Preston Sturges's The Lady Eve (1941), and again teamed with Tierney in the successful screwball comedy Rings on Her Fingers (1942). Stanwyck was one of Fonda's favorite co-stars, and they appeared in three films together. He was acclaimed for his role in The Ox-Bow Incident (1943).

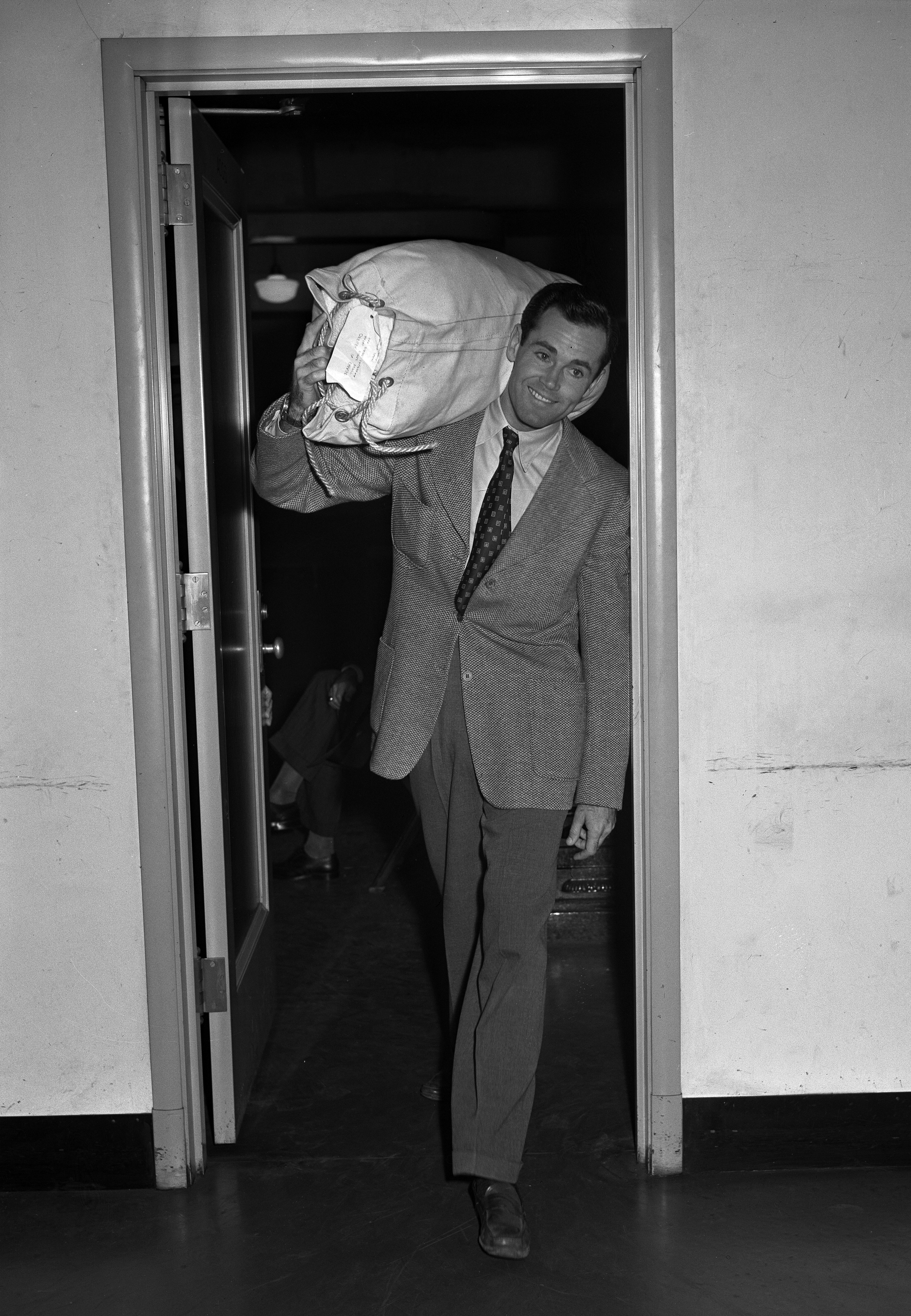
Fonda after enlisting in the United States Navy in November 1942

Fonda enlisted in the United States Navy to fight in World War II, saying, "I don't want to be in a fake war in a studio." Previously, Jimmy Stewart and Fonda had helped raise funds for the defense of Britain. Fonda served for three years, initially as a quartermaster 3rd class on the destroyer USS Satterlee. He was later commissioned as a lieutenant junior grade in Air Combat Intelligence in the Central Pacific and was awarded the Bronze Star Medal and Navy Presidential Unit Citation. Although he had been promoted to full lieutenant, Fonda was discharged from active duty due to being "overage in rank", and transferred to the Naval Reserve, serving three years (1945-1948).

=== Postwar career ===
After the war, Fonda took a break from movies and attended Hollywood parties and enjoyed civilian life. Stewart and Fonda would listen to records and invite Johnny Mercer, Hoagy Carmichael, Dinah Shore, and Nat King Cole over for music, with the latter giving the family piano lessons. Fonda played Wyatt Earp in My Darling Clementine (1946), which was directed by John Ford. Fonda did seven postwar films until his contract with Fox expired, the last being Otto Preminger's Daisy Kenyon (1947), opposite Joan Crawford. He starred in The Fugitive (1947), which was the first film of Ford's new production company, Argosy Pictures. In 1948 he appeared in a subsequent Argosy/Ford production, Fort Apache, as a rigid Army colonel, along with John Wayne and Shirley Temple in her first adult role.

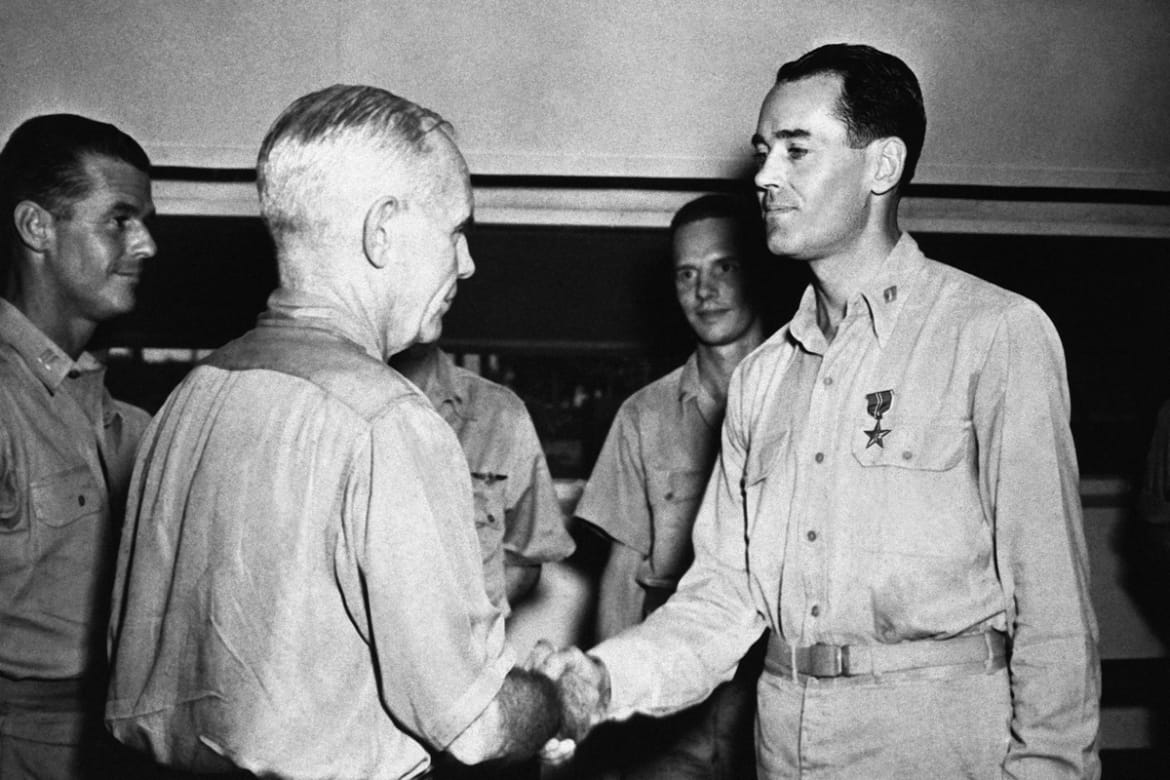
Wearing the bars of a full lieutenant, Fonda is awarded the Bronze Star.

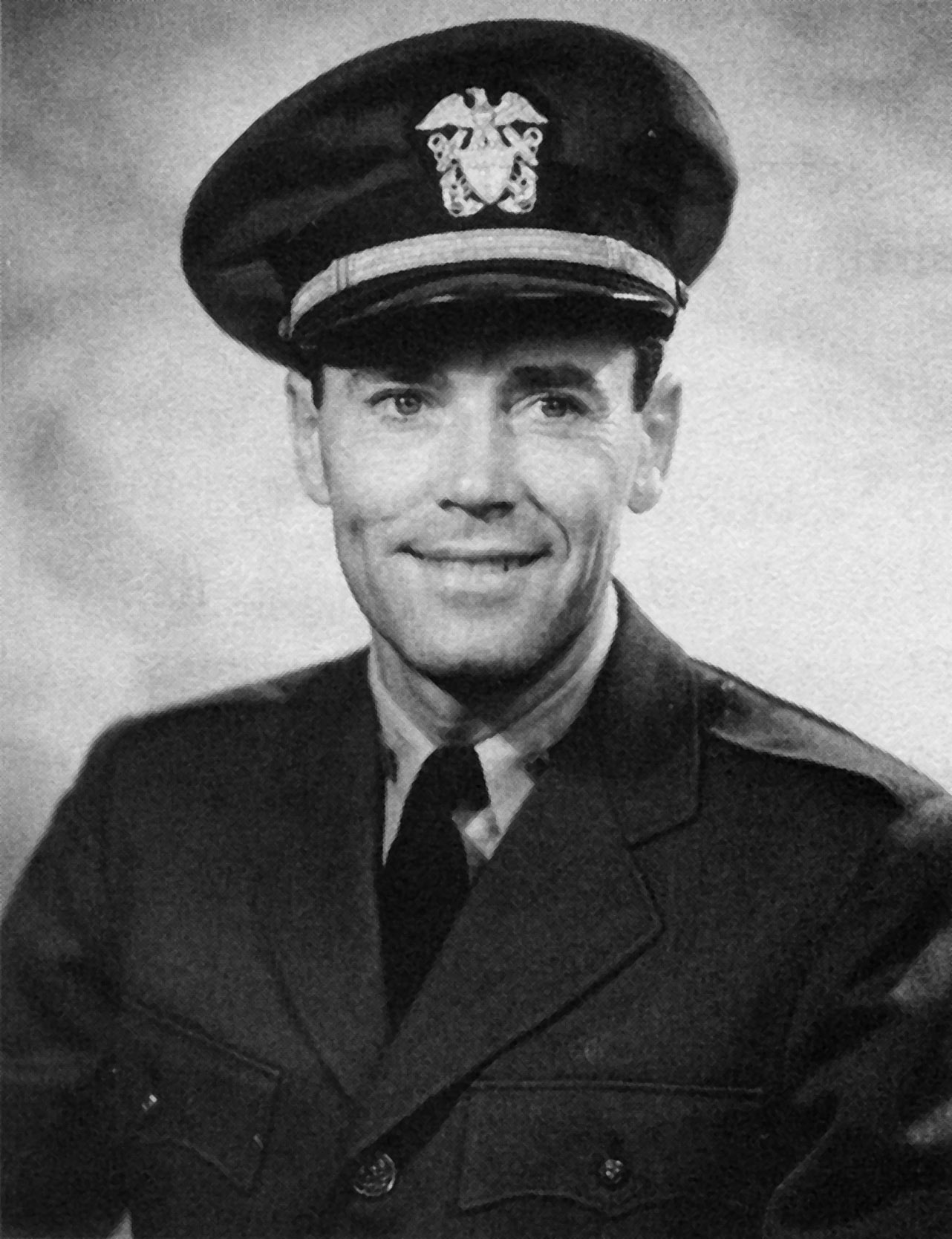
Fonda in Navy uniform

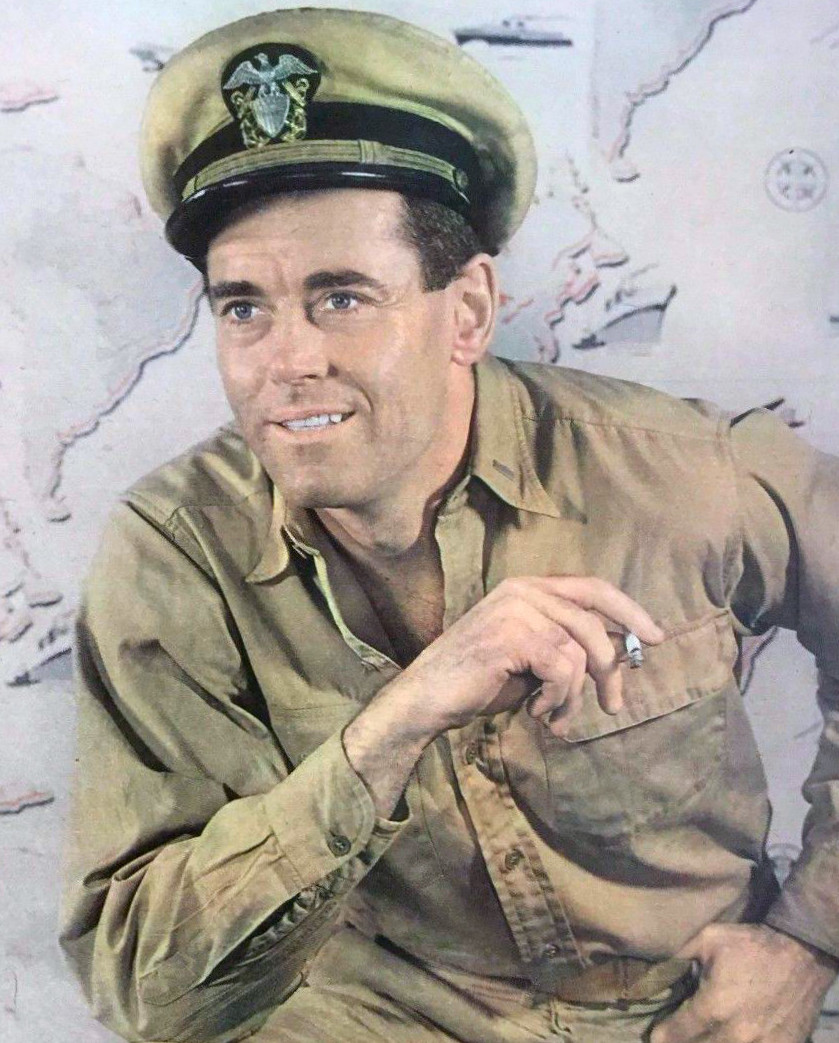
Fonda in Mister Roberts

Refusing another long-term studio contract, Fonda returned to Broadway, wearing his own officer's cap to originate the title role in Mister Roberts, a comedy about the U.S. Navy, during World War II in the South Pacific Ocean where Fonda, a junior officer, Lt. Douglas A. Roberts wages a private war against a tyrannical captain. He won a 1948 Tony Award for the part. Fonda followed that by reprising his performance in the national tour and with successful stage runs in Point of No Return and The Caine Mutiny Court-Martial. After an eight-year absence from films, he starred in the same role in the Mister Roberts (1955 film) version of Mister Roberts with James Cagney, William Powell, and Jack Lemmon, continuing a pattern of bringing his acclaimed stage roles to life on the big screen. On the set of Mister Roberts, Fonda came to blows with director John Ford, who punched him during filming, and Fonda vowed never to work for the director again. While he kept that vow for years, Fonda spoke glowingly of Ford in Peter Bogdanovich's documentary Directed by John Ford and in a documentary on Ford's career alongside Ford and James Stewart. Fonda refused to participate until he learned that Ford had insisted on casting Fonda as the lead in the film version of Mr. Roberts, reviving Fonda's film career after concentrating on the stage for years.

After Mr. Roberts, Fonda was next in Paramount Pictures's production of Leo Tolstoy's epic novel War and Peace (1956) about French Emperor Napoleon's invasion of Russia in 1812, in which he played Pierre Bezukhov opposite Audrey Hepburn; it took two years to shoot. Fonda worked with Alfred Hitchcock in 1956, playing a man falsely accused of robbery in The Wrong Man; the unusual semidocumentary work of Hitchcock was based on an actual incident and partly filmed on location.

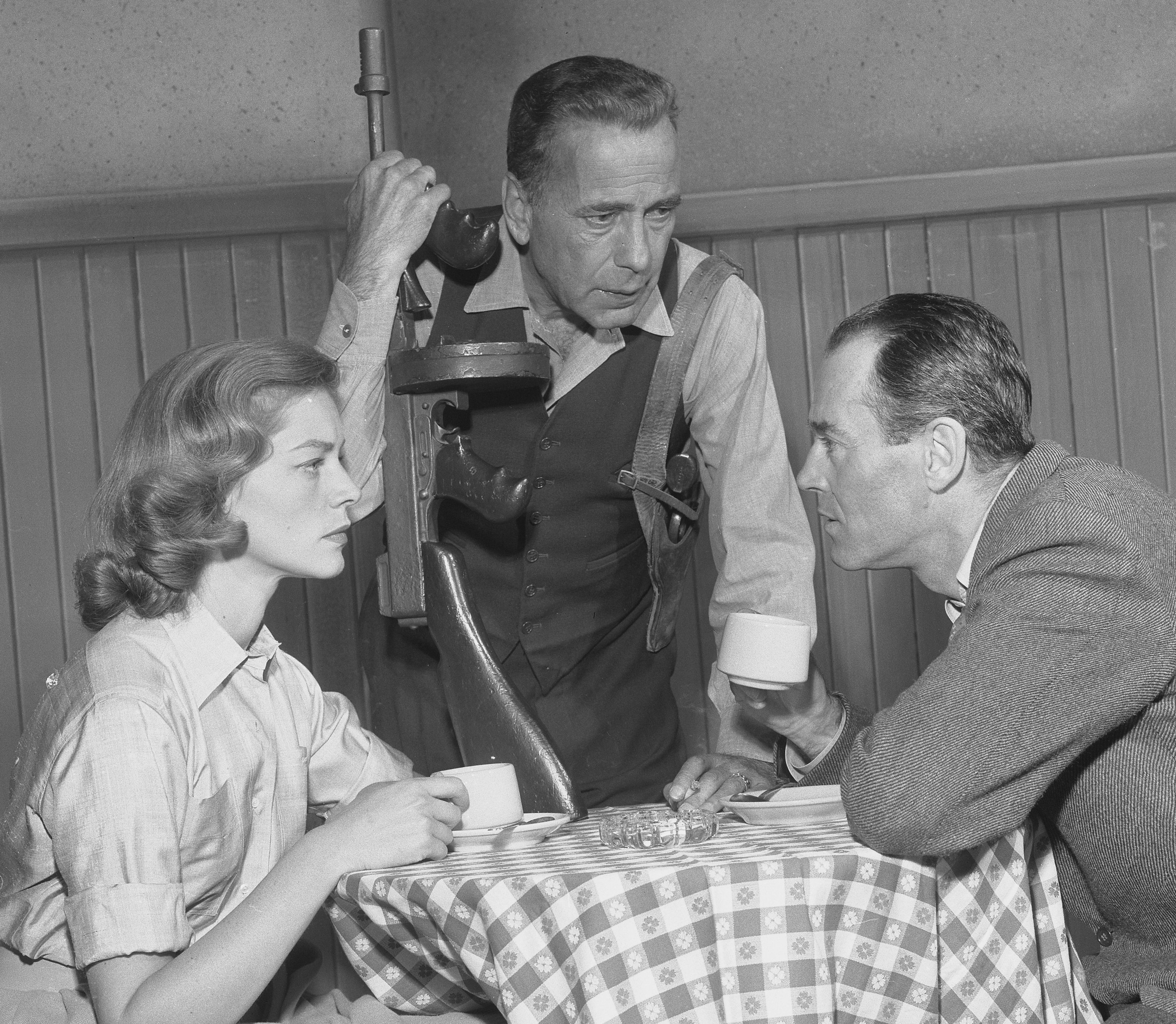
Lauren Bacall, Humphrey Bogart, and Fonda in a live 1955 color television version of The Petrified Forest

In 1957, Fonda made his first foray into producing with 12 Angry Men, in which he also starred. The film was based on a teleplay and a script by Reginald Rose, and directed by Sidney Lumet. The low-budget production was completed in 17 days of filming, mostly in one claustrophobic jury room. It had a strong cast, including also Jack Klugman, Lee J. Cobb, Martin Balsam, and E. G. Marshall. The intense story about twelve jurors deciding the fate of a young man accused of murder was well received by critics worldwide. Fonda shared the Academy Award and Golden Globe nominations with co-producer Reginald Rose, and won the 1958 BAFTA Award for Best Actor for his performance as Juror 8. Early on, the film drew poorly, but after gaining recognition and awards, it proved a success. In spite of the outcome, Fonda vowed that he would never produce a movie again, fearing that failing as a producer might derail his acting career. After acting in the Western movies The Tin Star (1957) and Warlock (1959), Fonda returned to the production seat for the NBC Western television series The Deputy (1959–1961), in which he starred as Marshal Simon Fry. His co-stars were Allen Case and Read Morgan.

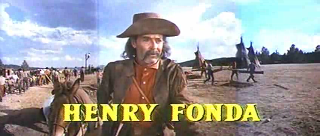
Fonda in How the West Was Won

During the 1960s, Fonda performed in a number of war and Western epics, including 1962's The Longest Day and the Cinerama production How the West Was Won, 1965's In Harm's Way, and Battle of the Bulge. In the Cold War suspense film Fail-Safe (1964), Fonda played the President of the United States who tries to avert a nuclear holocaust through tense negotiations with the Soviets after American bombers are mistakenly ordered to attack the USSR. He also returned to more light-hearted cinema in Spencer's Mountain (1963), which was the inspiration for the 1970s TV series, The Waltons, based on the Great Depression of the 1930s memories of Earl Hamner Jr.

Fonda appeared against type as the villain 'Frank' in 1968's Once Upon a Time in the West. After initially turning down the role, he was convinced to accept it by actor Eli Wallach and director Sergio Leone (who had previously tried to hire him to portray the Man with No Name in his Dollars Trilogy, a role that was later taken on by Clint Eastwood), who flew from Italy to the United States to persuade him to take the part. Fonda had planned on wearing a pair of brown-colored contact lenses, but Leone preferred the paradox of contrasting close-up shots of Fonda's innocent-looking blue eyes with the vicious personality of the character Fonda portrayed.

Fonda's relationship with Jimmy Stewart survived their disagreements over politics – Fonda was a liberal Democrat, and Stewart a conservative Republican. After a heated argument, they avoided talking politics with each other. The two men teamed up for 1968's Firecreek, where Fonda again played the heavy. In 1970, Fonda and Stewart co-starred in the Western The Cheyenne Social Club, in which they humorously argued politics. They had first appeared together on film in On Our Merry Way (1948), an episodic comedy which also starred William Demarest and Fred MacMurray and featured a grown-up Carl "Alfalfa" Switzer, who had acted as a child in the Our Gang movie serials of the 1930s.

=== Later career ===
Despite approaching his seventies, Fonda continued to work in theater, television and film through the 1970s. In 1970, Fonda appeared in three films; the most successful was The Cheyenne Social Club. The other two films were Too Late the Hero, in which Fonda played a secondary role, and There Was a Crooked Man, about Paris Pitman Jr. (played by Kirk Douglas) trying to escape from an Arizona prison.

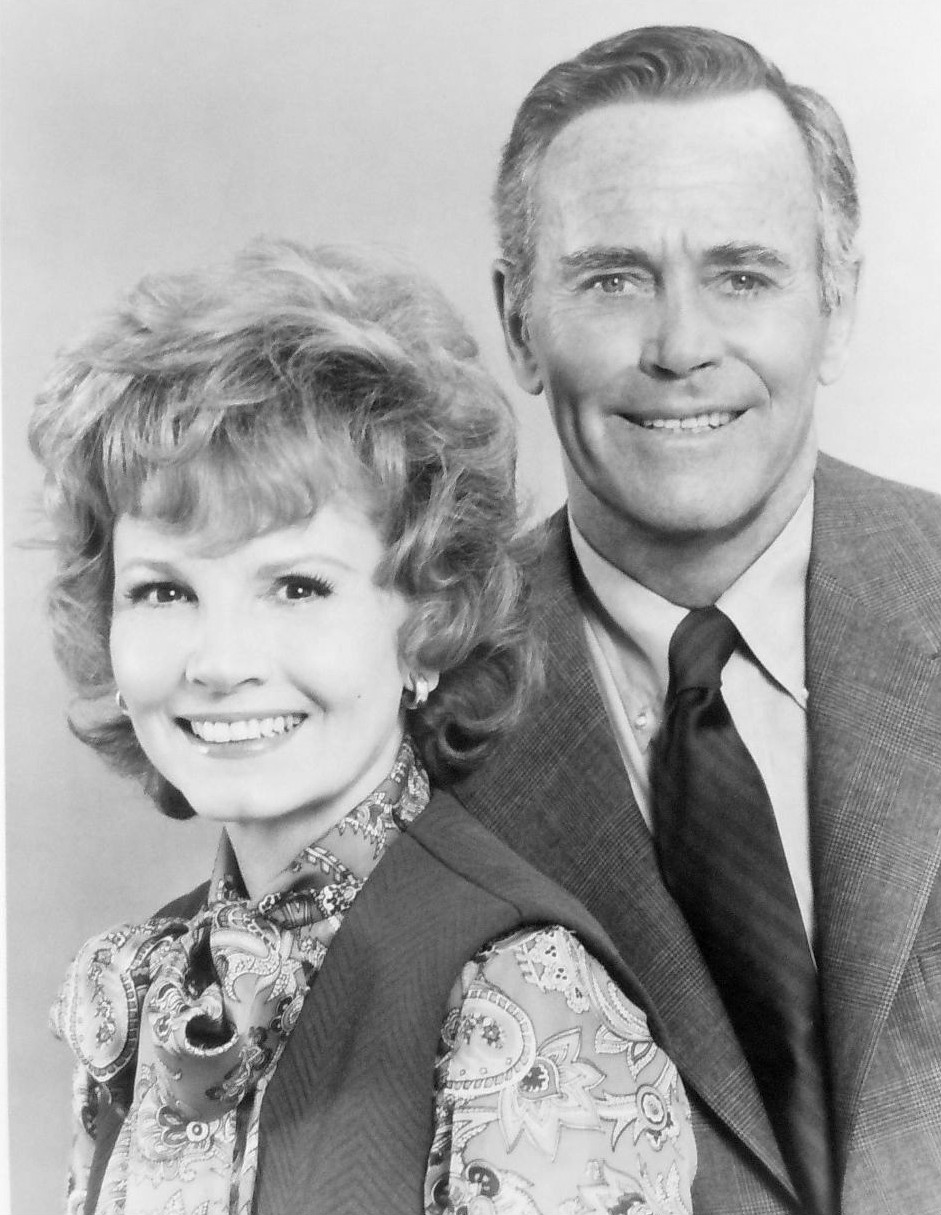
Janet Blair and Fonda in The Smith Family, 1971

Fonda returned to both foreign and television productions, which provided career sustenance through a decade in which many aging screen actors suffered waning careers. He starred in the ABC television series The Smith Family between 1971 and 1972. A television film adaptation of John Steinbeck's novel, 1973's The Red Pony, earned Fonda an Emmy nomination. After the unsuccessful Hollywood melodrama, Ash Wednesday, he filmed three Italian productions released in 1973 and 1974. The most successful of these, My Name Is Nobody, presented Fonda in a rare comedic performance as an old gunslinger whose plans to retire are dampened by a "fan" of sorts.

Fonda continued stage acting throughout his last years, including several demanding roles in Broadway plays. He returned to Broadway in 1974 for the biographical drama, Clarence Darrow, for which he was nominated for a Tony Award. Fonda's health had been deteriorating for years, but his first outward symptoms occurred after a performance of the play in April 1974, when he collapsed from exhaustion. After the appearance of a cardiac arrhythmia brought on by prostate cancer, he had a pacemaker installed following cancer surgery. Fonda returned to the play in 1975. After the run of a 1978 play, First Monday of October, he took the advice of his doctors and quit plays, though he continued to star in films and television.

Fonda appeared in a revival of The Time of Your Life that opened on March 17, 1972, at the Huntington Hartford Theater in Los Angeles, where Fonda, Richard Dreyfuss, Gloria Grahame, Ron Thompson, Strother Martin, Jane Alexander, Lewis J. Stadlen, Richard X. Slattery, and Pepper Martin were among the cast with Edwin Sherin directing.

In 1976, Fonda appeared in several notable television productions, the first being Collision Course, the story of the volatile relationship between President Harry Truman (E. G. Marshall) and General MacArthur (Fonda), produced by ABC. After an appearance in the acclaimed Showtime broadcast of Almos' a Man, based on a story by Richard Wright, he starred in the epic NBC miniseries Captains and the Kings, based on Taylor Caldwell's novel. Three years later, he appeared in ABC's Roots: The Next Generations, but the miniseries was overshadowed by its predecessor, Roots. Also in 1976, Fonda starred in the World War II blockbuster Midway.

Fonda finished the 1970s in a number of disaster films. The first of these was the 1977 Italian killer octopus thriller Tentacles and Rollercoaster, in which Fonda appeared with George Segal, Richard Widmark and a young Helen Hunt. He performed again with Widmark, Olivia de Havilland, Fred MacMurray, and José Ferrer in the killer bee action film The Swarm. He also acted in the global disaster film Meteor (his second role as a sitting President of the United States after Fail-Safe), with Sean Connery, Natalie Wood, and Karl Malden, and the Canadian production City on Fire, which also featured Shelley Winters and Ava Gardner. Fonda had a small role with his son, Peter, in Wanda Nevada (1979), with Brooke Shields.

As Fonda's health declined and he took longer breaks between filming, critics began to acknowledge the value of his extensive body of work. In 1979, he received the Golden Plate Award of the American Academy of Achievement. His Golden Plate was presented by Awards Council member Jimmy Stewart. In 1979, he was inducted into the American Theater Hall of Fame for his achievements on Broadway and received the Kennedy Center Honor. Lifetime Achievement awards from the Golden Globes and Academy Awards followed in 1980 and 1981, respectively.

Fonda continued to act into the early 1980s, though all but one of the productions in which he was featured before his death were for television. The television works included the live performance of Preston Jones's The Oldest Living Graduate and the Emmy-nominated Gideon's Trumpet (co-starring Fay Wray in her last performance) about Clarence Gideon's fight to have the right to publicly funded legal counsel for the indigent.

Fonda won an Academy Award for his work with Katharine Hepburn in On Golden Pond.

On Golden Pond in 1981, the film adaptation of Ernest Thompson's play, marked one final professional and personal triumph for Fonda. Directed by Mark Rydell, the movie presented a powerful collaboration between Fonda, Katharine Hepburn, and his daughter, Jane Fonda. The elder Fonda played an emotionally brittle and distant father who becomes more accessible at the end of his life. Jane Fonda has said that elements of the story mirrored their real-life relationship and helped them resolve certain issues. She bought the film rights in the hope that her father would play the role and later described it as "a gift to my father that was so unbelievably successful."

Premiered in December 1981, the film was well received by critics and, after a limited release on December 4, On Golden Pond developed enough of an audience to be widely released on January 22. With 10 Academy Award nominations, the film earned nearly $120 million at the box office, becoming an unexpected blockbuster. In addition to wins for Hepburn (Best Actress), and Thompson (Screenplay), On Golden Pond brought Fonda his only Oscar – for Best Actor (he was the oldest recipient of the award; it also earned him a Golden Globe Best Actor award). Fonda was by that point too ill to attend the ceremony, and his daughter Jane accepted on his behalf. She said when accepting the award that her dad would probably quip, "Well, ain't I lucky." Years later, Fonda's performance would be remembered as a "brutally honest portrayal of frightened old age."

Fonda's final performance was in the 1981 television drama Summer Solstice with Myrna Loy. It was filmed after On Golden Pond had wrapped and Fonda was in rapidly declining health.

== Personal life ==
=== Marriages and children ===
Henry Fonda family tree

William Brace Fonda; 1879–1935	Herberta Krueger Jaynes; 1879–1934
Henry Fonda; 1905–1982
Margaret Sullavan; 1909–1960	Frances Ford Seymour; 1908–1950	Susan Blanchard; 1928–	Afdera Franchetti; 1931–2025	Shirlee Mae Adams; 1932–
Roger Vadim; 1928–2000	Jane Fonda; 1937–	Tom Hayden; 1939–2016	Peter Fonda; 1940–2019	Susan J. Brewer
Vanessa Vadim; 1968–	Troy Garity; 1973–	Mary Williams; 1967–	Bridget Fonda; 1964–	Danny Elfman; 1953–	Justin Fonda; 1966–
Oliver Elfman; 2005–

Fonda was married five times and had three children, one of them adopted. His marriage to Margaret Sullavan in 1931 soon ended in separation, which was finalized in a 1933 divorce. Throughout most of 1935, Fonda dated actress/singer Shirley Ross; by year's end, it had been widely reported—by, among others, then-syndicated columnist Ed Sullivan—that the couple was engaged, with wedding plans afoot. Reports notwithstanding, both parties evidently reconsidered and in January 1936 it was reported that Fonda was now seeing actress Virginia Bruce.

Frances Ford Seymour and George Tuttle Brokaw had had a daughter, Frances Sophia De Villers Brokaw Corrias (10 October 1931 – 10 March 2008), who had been born soon after their marriage in 1931. Fonda met Frances at Denham Studios in England on the set of Wings of the Morning, the first picture in Europe to be filmed in three-strip Technicolor. In 1936, Henry and his fiancé, Frances, were photographed at the Atlantic Beach Club, Atlantic Beach, New York. On 16 September 1936, at Christ Church United Methodist in New York City, Henry Fonda married Frances Ford Seymour Brokaw, widow of a wealthy industrialist, George Tuttle Brokaw. Henry and Frances had two children, Jane (b. 1937) and Peter (1940–2019), both of whom became successful actors. Jane has won two Best Actress Academy Awards, and Peter was nominated for two Oscars, one for Best Actor.

Fonda with his daughter Jane, 1943

In August 1949, Fonda announced to Frances that he wanted a divorce so he could remarry; their 13 years of marriage had not been happy ones for him. Devastated by Fonda's confession and plagued by emotional problems for many years, Frances went into the Craig House Sanitarium in January 1950 for treatment. She committed suicide there on April 14. Before her death, she had written six notes to various individuals, but left no final message for her husband. Fonda quickly arranged a private funeral with only himself and his mother-in-law, Sophie Seymour, in attendance. Years later, Dr. Margaret Gibson, the psychiatrist who had treated Frances at Austen Riggs, described Henry Fonda as "a cold, self-absorbed person, a complete narcissist."

Later in 1950, Fonda married Susan Blanchard, his mistress. She was 21 years old, the daughter of Australian-born interior designer Dorothy Hammerstein, and the step-daughter of Oscar Hammerstein II. Together, they adopted a daughter, Amy Fishman (b. 1953). They divorced three years later. Blanchard was in awe of Fonda, and she described her role in the marriage as "a geisha", doing everything she could to please him, dealing with and solving problems he would not acknowledge.

In 1957 Fonda married the Italian baroness Afdera Franchetti. They divorced in 1961. Soon after, in 1965, Fonda married Shirlee Mae Adams (born in 1932) and remained with her until his death in 1982.

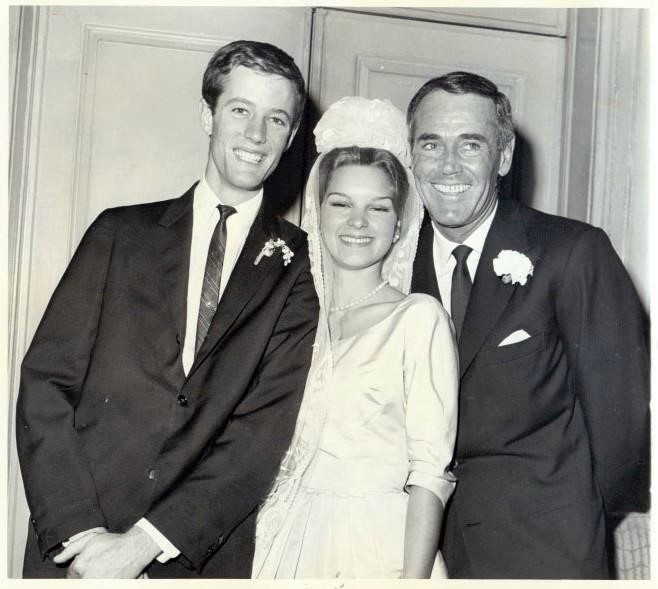
Fonda at son Peter's 1961 wedding to Susan Brewer

Fonda's relationship with his children has been described as "emotionally distant". Fonda loathed displays of feeling in himself or others, and this was a consistent part of his character. Whenever he felt that his emotional wall was being breached, he had outbursts of anger, exhibiting a furious temper that terrified his family. In Peter Fonda's 1998 autobiography Don't Tell Dad (1998), he described how he was never sure how his father felt about him. He never volunteered to his father that he loved him until he was elderly, and Peter finally heard, "I love you, son." His daughter Jane rejected her father's friendships with Republican actors such as John Wayne and James Stewart. Their relationship became extremely strained as Jane Fonda became a left-wing activist.

Jane Fonda reported feeling detached from her father, especially during her early acting days. In 1958 she met Lee Strasberg while visiting her father in Malibu. The Fonda and Strasberg families were neighbors, and she had developed a friendship with Strasberg's daughter, Susan. Jane Fonda began studying acting with Strasberg, learning the techniques of "The Method" of which Strasberg was a renowned proponent. This proved to be a pivotal point in her career. As Jane Fonda developed her skill as an actress, she became frustrated with her father's talent that, to her, appeared a demonstration of effortless ability.

=== Political views ===
Fonda was a supporter of the Democratic Party and "an admirer" of U.S. President Franklin D. Roosevelt. In 1960 Fonda appeared in a campaign commercial for presidential candidate John F. Kennedy. The ad focused on Kennedy's naval service during World War II, specifically the famous PT-109 incident. He supported Lyndon B. Johnson in the 1964 United States presidential election, and Ted Kennedy in the 1980 Democratic Party primaries. He was initially a registered Republican, but switched parties.

=== On acting ===
The writer Al Aronowitz, while working on a profile of Jane Fonda for The Saturday Evening Post in the 1960s, asked Henry Fonda about method acting: "I can't articulate about the Method", he told me, "because I never studied it. I don't mean to suggest that I have any feelings one way or the other about it...I don't know what the Method is and I don't care what the Method is. Everybody's got a method. Everybody can't articulate about their method, and I can't, if I have a method—and Jane sometimes says that I use the Method, that is, the capital letter Method, without being aware of it. Maybe I do; it doesn't matter."

Aronowitz reported Jane saying, "My father can't articulate the way he works. He just can't do it. He's not even conscious of what he does, and it made him nervous for me to try to articulate what I was trying to do. And I sensed that immediately, so we did very little talking about it...he said, 'Shut up, I don't want to hear about it.' He didn't want me to tell him about it, you know. He wanted to make fun of it."

== Death ==
Fonda died at Cedars Sinai on August 12, 1982, from heart disease. Fonda's wife, Shirlee, his daughter Jane, and his son Peter were at his side that day. He suffered from prostate cancer, but this did not directly cause his death and was noted only as a concurrent ailment on his death certificate.

Fonda requested that no funeral be held, and his body was cremated. President Ronald Reagan, a former actor himself, and an acquaintance of his, hailed Fonda as "a true professional dedicated to excellence in his craft. He graced the screen with a sincerity and accuracy which made him a legend."

The home where Fonda was born in 1905 is preserved at The Stuhr Museum of the Prairie Pioneer in Grand Island, Nebraska.

== Legacy ==
Fonda is widely recognized as one of the Hollywood greats of the classic era. On the centenary of his birth, May 16, 2005, Turner Classic Movies (TCM) honored Fonda with a marathon of his films. Also in May 2005, the United States Post Office released a 37-cent postage stamp with an artist's drawing of Fonda as part of their "Hollywood legends" series. The Fonda Theatre in Hollywood, originally known as the Carter DeHaven Music Box, was named for the actor in 1985 by the Nederlander Organization.

== In popular culture ==
In Joseph Heller's satirical novel Catch-22, there is a running joke that fictional character Major Major Major Major resembles Henry Fonda. Philip D. Beidler comments that "one of the novel's great absurd jokes is the character's bewildering resemblance to Henry Fonda".

== Filmography ==
From the beginning of his career in 1935 through his last projects in 1981, Fonda appeared in 106 films, television programs, and shorts. Through the course of his career, he appeared in many films, including classics such as 12 Angry Men and The Ox-Bow Incident. He was nominated for an Academy Award for Best Actor for his role in 1940's The Grapes of Wrath and won for his part in 1981's On Golden Pond. Fonda made his mark in Westerns (which included his most villainous role as Frank in Once Upon a Time in the West) and war films, and made frequent appearances in both television and foreign productions late in his career.

== Theatre ==
Broadway stage performances

- The Game of Love and Death (November 1929 – January 1930)
- I Loved You, Wednesday (October – December 1932)
- New Faces of 1934 (Revue; March – July 1934)
- The Farmer Takes a Wife (October 1934 – January 1935)
- Blow Ye Winds (September – October 1937)
- Mister Roberts (February 1948 – January 1951)
- Point of No Return (December 1951 – November 1952)
- The Caine Mutiny Court-Martial (January 1954 – January 1955)
- Two for the Seesaw (January 1958 – October 1959)
- Silent Night, Lonely Night (December 1959 – March 1960)
- Critic's Choice (December 1960 – May 1961)
- A Gift of Time (February – May 1962)
- Generation (October 1965 – June 1966)
- Our Town (November – December 1969)
- Clarence Darrow (March – April 1974; March 1975)
- First Monday in October (October – December 1978)

== Awards and nominations ==
Awards	Year	Category	Work	Result
Academy Awards	1941	Best Actor	The Grapes of Wrath	Nominated
Academy Awards	1958	Best Picture	12 Angry Men	Nominated
Academy Awards	1981	Academy Honorary Award	—N/a	Honored
Academy Awards	1982	Best Actor	On Golden Pond	Won
BAFTA Awards	1958	Best Actor	12 Angry Men	Won
BAFTA Awards	1982	Best Actor	On Golden Pond	Nominated
Primetime Emmy Awards	1973	Outstanding Lead Actor in a Limited Series or Movie	The Red Pony	Nominated
Primetime Emmy Awards	1975	Outstanding Lead Actor in a Limited Series or Movie	Clarence Darrow	Nominated
Primetime Emmy Awards	1980	Outstanding Lead Actor in a Limited Series or Movie	Gideon's Trumpet	Nominated
Golden Globe Awards	1958	Best Actor – Motion Picture Drama	12 Angry Men	Nominated
Golden Globe Awards	1980	Cecil B. DeMille Award	—N/a	Honored
Golden Globe Awards	1982	Best Actor – Motion Picture Drama	On Golden Pond	Won
Grammy Awards	1977	Best Spoken Word Album	Great American Documents	Won
Tony Awards	1948	Best Actor in a Play	Mister Roberts	Won
Tony Awards	1975	Best Actor in a Play	Clarence Darrow	Nominated
Tony Awards	1979	Special Tony Award	—N/a	Honored
AFI Awards	1978	Life Achievement Award	—N/a	Honored

== See also ==
- List of actors with two or more Academy Awards in acting categories
- List of oldest and youngest Academy Award winners and nominees — Oldest winners for Best Lead Actor
- List of Academy Award–winning families
- Albert Brown (American veteran) cousin, last survivor of the Bataan death march

== Bibliography ==
- Bosworth, Patricia (2011). Jane Fonda, The Private Life of a Public Woman. Houghton Mifflin Harcourt. p. p.18. ISBN 9780547504476.
- Collier, Peter (1991). The Fondas: A Hollywood Dynasty. Putnam. ISBN 0-399-13592-8.
- Fonda, Henry (1981). Fonda: My Life. Fulcrum Publishing. ISBN 0-453-00402-4.
- Fonda, Jane (2005). My Life So Far. Random House. ISBN 0-375-50710-8.
- Fonda, Peter (1998). Don't Tell Dad. Hyperion. ISBN 0-7868-6111-8.
- Houghton, Norris (1951). But Not Forgotten: The Adventure of the University Players. New York: William Sloane Associates.
- James, John Douglas (1976). The MGM Story. Crown Publishers. ISBN 0-517-52389-2.
- McKinney, Devin (2012). The Man Who Saw a Ghost: The Life and Work of Henry Fonda. St. Martin's Press. ISBN 978-1-250-00841-1.
- Roberts, Allen; Goldstein, Max (1984). Henry Fonda: A Biography. McFarland & Co. ISBN 0-89950-114-1.
- Sweeney, Kevin (1992). Henry Fonda: A BioBibliography. Greenwood Press. ISBN 0-313-26571-2.
- Thomas, Tony (1990). The Films of Henry Fonda. Citadel Press. ISBN 0-8065-1189-3.
- Wise, James (1997). Stars in Blue: Movie Actors in America's Sea Services. Annapolis, MD: Naval Institute Press. ISBN 1557509379. OCLC 36824724.
- Beidler, Philip D. (1996). "Mr. Roberts and American Remembering; or, Why Major Major Major Major Looks Like Henry Fonda". Journal of American Studies. 30. Cambridge University Press: 47–64. doi:10.1017/S0021875800024312. OCLC 143830992. S2CID 143830992.
