= George Tuttle Brokaw =

American lawyer (1879–1935)

- Born: November 14, 1879; Elberon, New Jersey, U.S.
- Died: May 28, 1935 (aged 55); Hartford, Connecticut, U.S.
- Education: Princeton University (BA); New York Law School (LLB); University of Toledo College of Law (LLM)
- Occupations: Lawyer, sportsman
- Spouses: Clare Boothe (m. 1923; div. 1929) Frances Ford Seymour (m. 1931)
- Children: 2
- Parent: Isaac Vail Brokaw
- Relatives: Irving Brokaw (brother)

George Tuttle Brokaw (November 14, 1879 – May 28, 1935) was an American lawyer and sportsman.

== Early life ==
He was born in the Elberon section of Long Branch, New Jersey, a son of Isaac Vail Brokaw, who with his brother, William, owned the New York City-based Brokaw Brothers clothing stores from 1856 until his death in 1914. His elder brother Irving Brokaw was a national ice skating champion and competed in the 1908 Summer Olympics, finishing fourth in the men's competition.

As the eldest child, George inherited the right to live for life in the Brokaw Mansion at 1 East 79th Street in Manhattan, and later fought with his brother, Howard C. Brokaw, over his plans to demolish the mansion.

== Career ==
Educated in the Cutler School; then Princeton University, graduating in 1902 with a BA, and New York Law School, graduating in 1911 with a LLB. He was admitted to the bar in 1912 and continued his legal education with an LLM degree from the University of Toledo College of Law, where he was first in his class, graduating in 1906. Toledo Law's weekly newspaper is still named after him: Toledo's Brokaw Edition. There is a portrait in the Brokaw Edition's office.

== Personal life ==
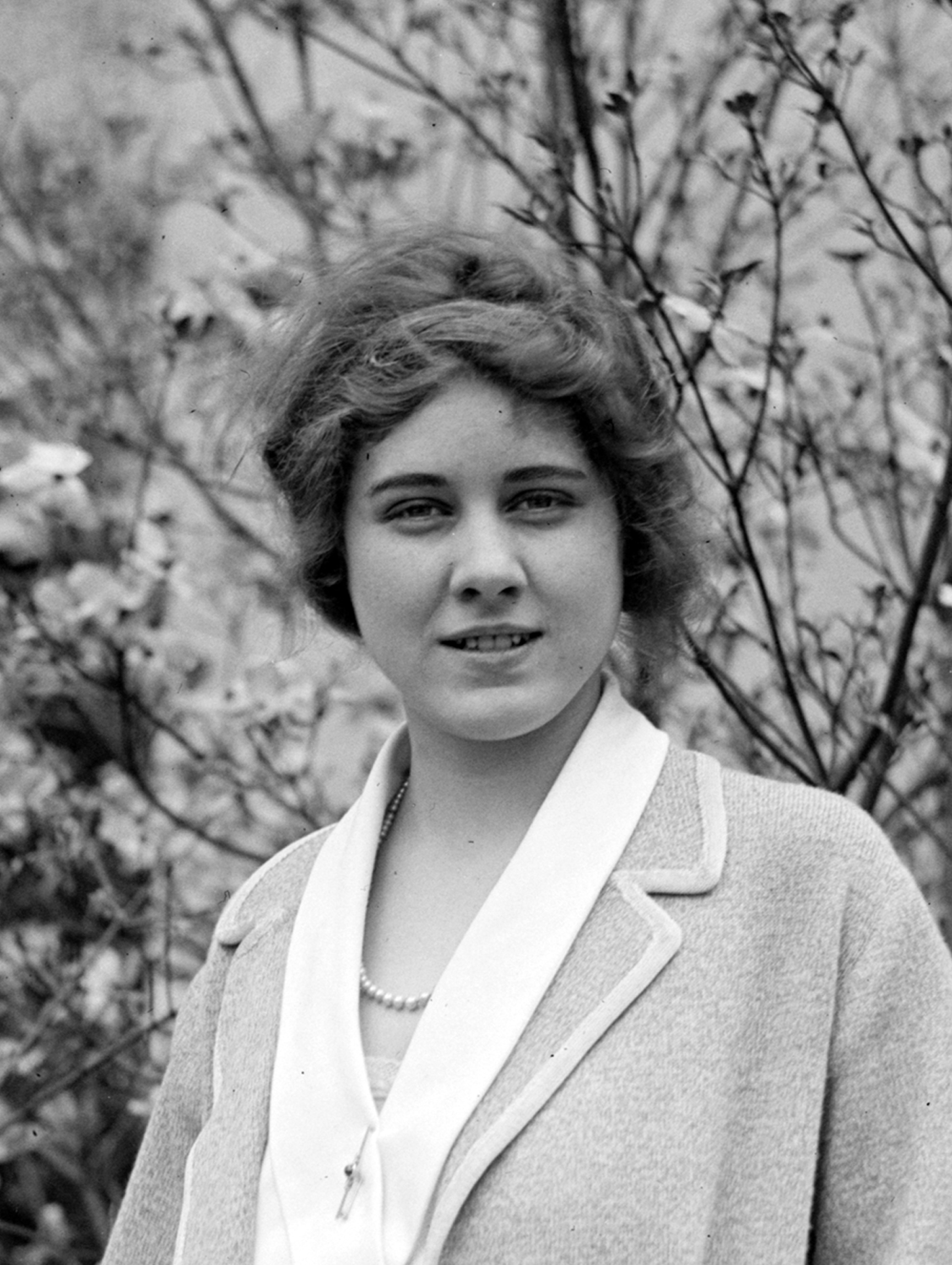
Photograph of his first wife, Clare Boothe, 1923

On August 10, 1923, Brokaw married writer Clare Boothe (1903–1987) in Greenwich, Connecticut. According to Boothe, Brokaw was an abusive alcoholic, and the marriage ended in divorce on May 20, 1929. Before their divorce, they were the parents of one daughter:

- Ann Clare Brokaw (1924–1944), who died in a car accident at the age of nineteen while attending Stanford University.

On January 10, 1931, Brokaw married Frances Ford Seymour (1908–1950) in a small New York City wedding. They had one child, a daughter:

- Frances de Villers Brokaw (1931–2008), who married Charles Leo Abry in 1949. She later married Francesco Corrias, Italy's Consul General.

Brokaw died of a heart attack on May 28, 1935. After his death, Frances Ford Seymour married actor Henry Fonda in 1936; the couple had two children, Jane and Peter Fonda.
