= Fairchild Brothers & Foster =

- Industry: Drug manufacturing
- Founders: Thomas Fairchild; Samuel W. Fairchild; Macomb G. Foster
- Defunct: 1946
- Fate: Acquired by Sterling Drug
- Headquarters: New York City, United States
- Key people: Thomas Fairchild (President)

Fairchild Brothers & Foster was a drug manufacturer, which was based in New York City in the 1930s.

== History ==
Thomas Fairchild studied at Stratford Academy and graduated from Philadelphia College of Pharmacy. Afterward he joined Caswell Havard & Company of New York City. Later, he organized Fairchild Brothers & Foster, together with his brother, Samuel W. Fairchild (d. 1927), and Macomb G. Foster (d.1938). Macomb George Foster was the brother of Pell William Foster (d.1947) founder of the Foster Wheeler corporation, and the son William Foster Jr, former President of several New York based railroad concerns and founder of the Retsof Salt Mining Company in Retsof, New York. Macomb G Foster began his continuous affiliation of fifty-seven years with Fairchild Brothers & Foster in 1881.

== Acquisition ==
The company was first acquired by Winthrop Chemical Company, the latter then acquired by Sterling Drug, Inc., in February 1946. Fairchild Brothers & Foster specialized in making drugs to assist digestive disorders. Among the drugs it produced were Marinol, Phisoderm, and Enzymo.

Stearns & Company, a subsidiary of Sterling Drug, Inc., took over the distribution of all except three drugs made by the acquired concern. Winthrop Chemical Company, also a Sterling subsidiary, resumed the manufacture of Marinol, Phisoderm, and Enzymo.

== See also ==
- Sterling Drug, Inc.
