= Irving Brokaw =

American figure skater

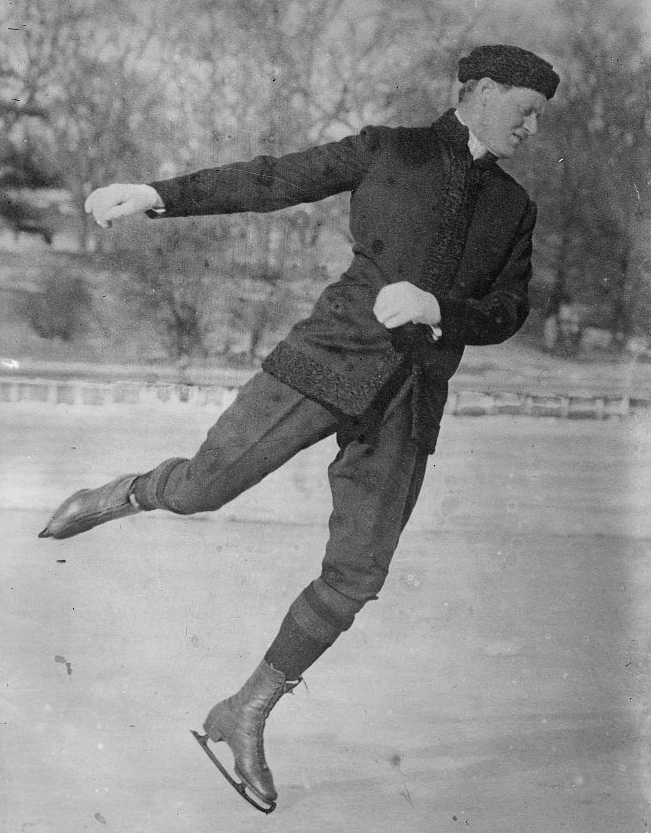
- Brokaw in the early 1910s

Personal information
- Full name: Isaac Irving Brokaw
- Born: March 29, 1871 New York City, U.S.
- Died: March 18, 1939 (aged 67) West Palm Beach, Florida, U.S.

Figure skating career
- Country: United States
- Discipline: Men's singles
- Skating club: St. Nicholas Skating Club

Isaac Irving Brokaw (March 29, 1871 – March 18, 1939) was an American figure skater, artist, lawyer, and financier. He represented the United States at the 1908 Summer Olympics in the figure skating competition, becoming the first American to compete in a sport included in the Winter Olympic program. After he won an international prize in Switzerland, he brought the International Style of skating back to the United States. His book, The Art of Skating, was known as the figure skater's bible.

== Personal life and family ==
He was born in New York City on March 29, 1871, as Isaac Irving Brokaw to Isaac Vail Brokaw and Elvira Tuttle Gould. He was a member of a wealthy New York City family, his father having founded the Brokaw Brothers men's clothing stores. His brothers were lawyer and sportsman George Tuttle Brokaw (whose first wife was Clare Boothe (later Clare Boothe Luce), Howard Crosby Brokaw, and Frederick Brokaw, who drowned at Elberon, New Jersey, while a student at Princeton. Noted cousins included sportsmen William Gould Brokaw and Clifford Vail Brokaw, their sisters Florence Brokaw, of Martin Hall (Mrs. James E. Martin, later Mrs. Preston Pope Satterwhite) and Lilla Brokaw (Mrs. H. Bramhall Gilbert, later Mrs. Cyril Patrick William Francis Radclyffe Dugmore).

On February 4, 1903, Brokaw married Lucile Nave in St. Joseph. Her family co-owned the Nave & McCord Mercantile Company, a chain of wholesale stores in the Midwest. They had three daughters:

- Barbara Lucile, who married Leonard Jarvis Cushing.
- Louise Elvira, aka Mimi, who married Richard Derby Tucker.
- Lucile, who married, first, James Duane Pell Bishop; second, Rombout van Riemsdyk; and third, Roelof Carel DeBoer. She became an artist.

Irving Brokaw died March 19, 1939, in West Palm Beach, Florida. He is buried at Locust Valley Cemetery in Locust Valley, N.Y.

== Career ==
As a figure skater, Brokaw competed in early national championships in the United States that predated the U.S. Figure Skating Championships and won the events in 1906 and 1908. He competed at the 1908 Summer Olympics in figure skating, where he placed 6th. The 1908 Olympics were the first Games in which figure skating was contested. Brokaw became the first American to compete in skating and, by extension, any Winter Olympic sport at the Olympic Games.

He was later elected as an honorary president of the U.S. Figure Skating Association and made large contributions to skating techniques.

Brokaw graduated from New York Law School in 1907 but never practiced law as a profession. He was also a well-known artist and a member of The Salons of America, an art society, and the Huguenot Society.

In 1910, Brokaw wrote the first of four books, all entitled The Art of Skating, which was referred to as the "figure skater's bible" by Time Magazine. The first book included chapters written by leading skaters of the time, including Georg Sanders of Russia, who wrote about special figures, Phyllis Johnson and James H. Johnson from England, who wrote about pair skating, and Gilbert Fuchs from Germany, who wrote an essay entitled, "Theory of Skating".

In 1976, Brokaw was posthumously inducted into the United States Figure Skating Hall of Fame.
