= Brokaw Bullet =

BJ-520 or "Bullet"
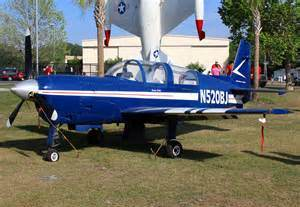
- The BJ-520 modified to Turboprop motor.

General information
- Type: Sports plane
- Manufacturer: Homebuilt
- Designer: Bergon Brokaw and Ernie Jones

History
- First flight: 18 November 1972

The BJ-520 or "Bullet" was a two-seat sports airplane designed in the United States for amateur construction.

== Development ==
Dr. Bergon Brokaw, having flown fighter aircraft in the United States Navy in the 1940s and 1950s, set out to create an aircraft with fighter-like performance and a rear seat to carry his wife "Buddy". With the help of Ernie Jones, they created a low-wing single-engine high-speed aircraft which was also stressed for aerobatic flight. After six years of development and construction, it first flew in October 1972 and was considered the fastest homebuilt aircraft extant. Its tricycle undercarriage is retractable.

The Bullet originally flew with a Continental TSIO-520B turbocharged six-cylinder piston engine rated at 310 hp (230 kW). With that engine its top speed is listed as 219 mph (352 km/h; 190 kn) at sea level and 322 mph (518 km/h; 280 kn) at 20,000 ft (6,100 m). The name and the aircraft's registration number (N520BJ) came from the first letters of Brokaw and Jones and the 520 cu in (8.5 L) displacement of the engine.

The engine was later changed for a Lycoming TSIO-541-E1A4 turbocharged six-cylinder piston engine rated at 380 hp (280 kW).

Its final engine configuration was a Garrett TPE331-25AA turboprop, rated at 475 hp (354 kW). It is displayed with that engine at the Sun 'n Fun Museum as of 2008.

During the 1970s and 1980s, Brokaw marketed the plans to other homebuilders.

The prototype aircraft is preserved and displayed at the Sun 'n Fun air museum at Lakeland, Florida.

Only one plans-built Brokaw Bullet has been completed by builder Gene Underland. There are a few projects still in the process of being completed, but builder support is dubious since Brokaw died on 27 August 2004.

== Specifications (original BJ-520) ==
General characteristics

- Crew: one pilot
- Capacity: 1 passenger
- Length: 22 ft 9 in (6.94 m)
- Wingspan: 23 ft 8 in (7.21 m)
- Height: 8 ft 10 in (2.69 m)
- Wing area: 97 sq ft (9.0 m^{2})
- Powerplant: 1 × Lycoming TIO-541-A , 380 hp (283 kW)

Performance

- Cruise speed: 320 mph (515 km/h, 280 kn)
- Rate of climb: 3,000 ft/min (15.0 m/s)
