= Frances Ford Seymour =

Canadian-born American socialite (1908–1950)

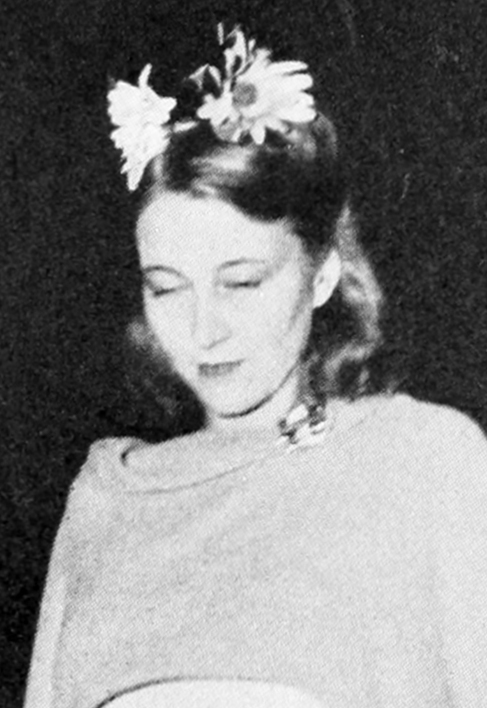
- Seymour in 1938
- Born: 4 April 1908; Westport, Ontario, Canada
- Died: 14 April 1950 (aged 42); Beacon, New York, U.S.
- Resting place: Ogdensburg Cemetery, Ogdensburg, New York, U.S.
- Occupation: Socialite
- Spouses: George Tuttle Brokaw (m. 1931; died 1935) Henry Fonda (m. 1936)
- Children: 3, including Jane and Peter Fonda
- Relatives: Bridget Fonda (granddaughter); Troy Garity (grandson)

Frances Ford Seymour Fonda (4 April 1908 – 14 April 1950) was a Canadian-American socialite. She was the second wife of actor Henry Fonda and the mother of actors Jane Fonda and Peter Fonda.

== Biography ==
Born in Brockville, Ontario, Canada, Seymour was the daughter of Sophie Mildred (née Bower) and Eugene Ford Seymour. When she was 14 in 1922, she moved with her family to Fairhaven, Massachusetts and graduated from a public high school there. According to her daughter Jane, who gained access to records from a psychiatric hospital with "help" from lawyers, Seymour was a victim of recurrent child incestuous abuse in Ontario and eventually had nine abortions.

On 10 January 1931, she married George Tuttle Brokaw, a millionaire lawyer and sportsman. They had one daughter, Frances de Villers "Pan" Brokaw (10 October 1931 – 10 March 2008).

Brokaw died in 1935, and a year later Seymour married actor Henry Fonda on 16 September 1936, at Christ Church, New York City. She had met Fonda at Denham Film Studios in England on the set of the film Wings of the Morning. The couple had two children, Jane (born 21 December 1937) and Peter (23 February 1940 – 16 August 2019), who both became actors. But their marriage was troubled. According to Peter Fonda, these difficulties later gave him empathy for the marital problems of actor Dennis Hopper, his co-star in the 1969 film Easy Rider. Hopper's then-wife Brooke Hayward is the daughter of Margaret Sullavan, Henry Fonda's first wife.

Frances, who had been diagnosed with bipolar disorder, died by suicide while she was a patient at the Craig House Sanitarium in Beacon, New York. Her suicide came three and a half months after Fonda asked her for a divorce. She is buried in Ogdensburg Cemetery, Ogdensburg, New York.
