= Brokaw-McDougall House =

Historic house in Florida, United States

- U.S. National Register of Historic Places
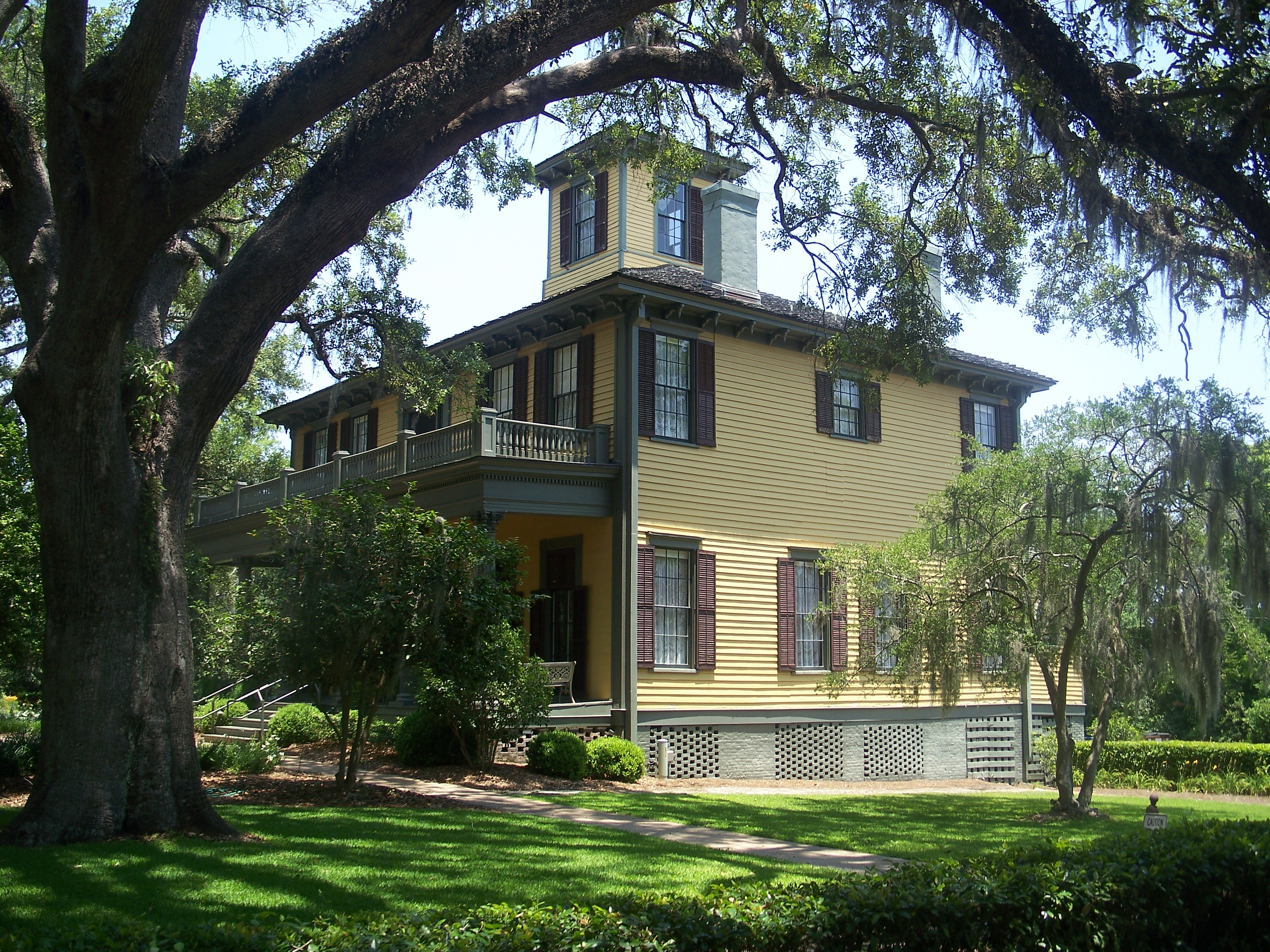
- The Brokaw-McDougall House

- Location within Florida Location within the United States
- Location: Tallahassee, Florida
- Coordinates: 30°26′44″N 84°16′35″W
- Architectural style: Greek Revival
- NRHP reference No.: 72000333
- Added to NRHP: 24 July 1972

The Brokaw-McDougall House is a historic mansion in Tallahassee, Florida. Built in 1856, it is located at 329 North Meridian Road. On July 24, 1972, it was added to the U.S. National Register of Historic Places.

The house was begun in 1856 and completed in 1860 by Peres Bonney Brokaw who had moved to Florida from New Jersey in 1850. His daughter eventually inherited the house; the reference to McDougall in the house's name comes from that daughter's married name. The house was sold to Florida in 1973 and is used as the offices of the Historic Tallahassee Preservation Board.
