= Isaac Brokaw =

American clockmaker

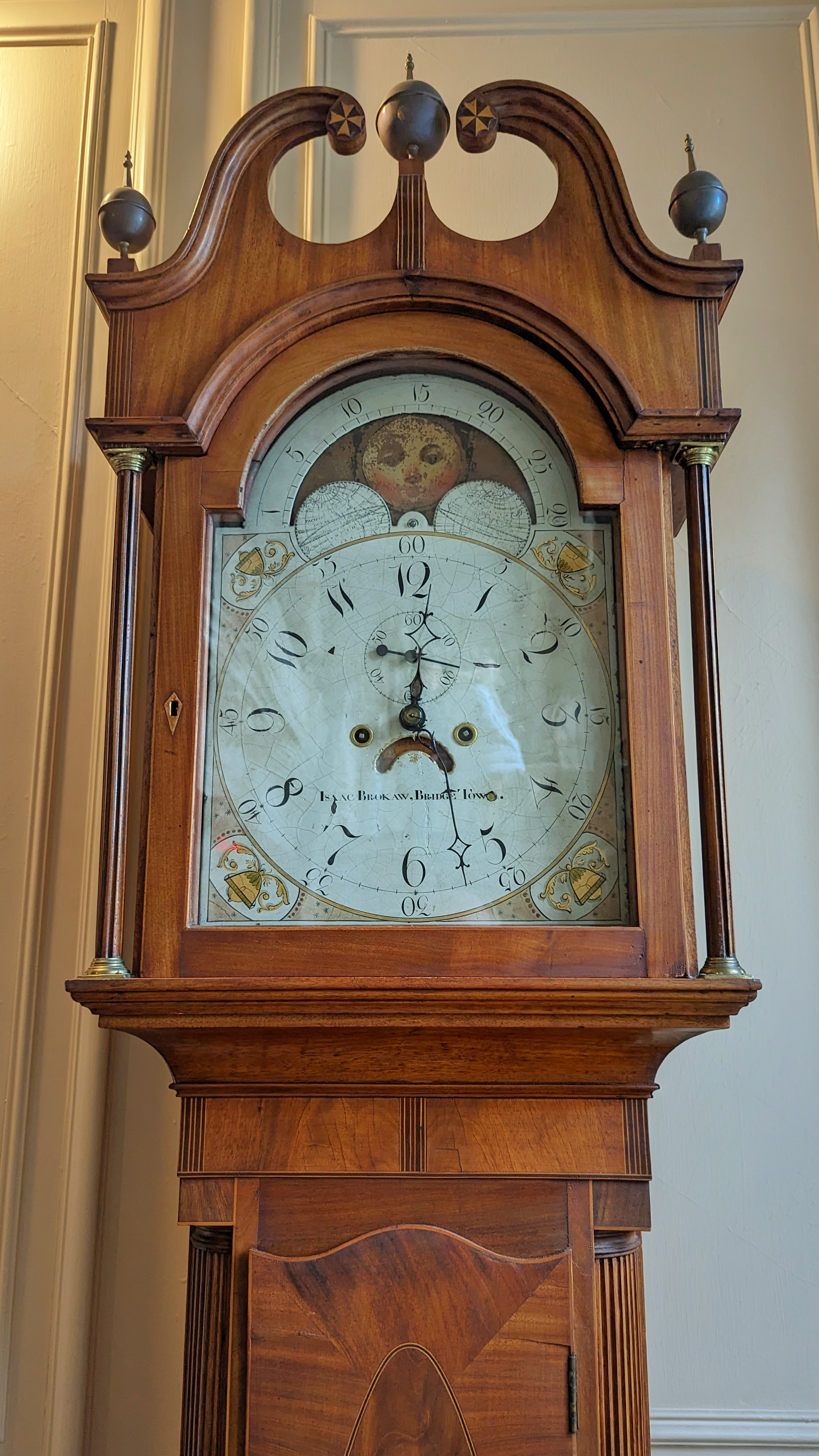
Clock by Isaac Brokaw in Blithewold Mansion

Isaac Brokaw (9 March 1746 – 16 September 1826) was a clockmaker from New Jersey.

== Biography ==
Brokaw was born in Raritan in Somerset County, but would leave for Elizabethtown where he would work as an apprentice under Aaron Miller, a renowned clockmaker. He would later marry Miller's daughter, Elizabeth Miller. In 1770, Brokaw was living in Bridgewater when a local judge ordered that his property be sold off in order to pay off his outstanding debts. However, he was allowed to keep 30 lb of lead in order to continue his trade. Shortly thereafter he would again leave for Elizabeth, where he would produce some of his first significant works. Aaron Miller died in 1778, and left part of his clockmaking tools to him as his son-in-law. In 1790 Isaac and Elizabeth relocated to Bridge Town (today known as Rahway). The style practiced by Miller and Brokaw is of a decidedly Dutch tradition, as Central Jersey, particularly around Somerset County, was known as an early Dutch settlement.

They had three sons, Aaron, Cornelius, and John. Aaron, the eldest of them, took up the trade of clockmaking, having been taught by his father.
