= 2001 in the United States =

- Decades: 1980s; 1990s; 2000s; 2010s; 2020s
- See also: History of the United States (1991–2016); Timeline of United States history (1990–2009); List of years in the United States

Events from the year 2001 in the United States.

== Incumbents ==
=== Federal government ===
- President:

Bill Clinton (D-Arkansas) (until January 20)
George W. Bush (R-Texas) (starting January 20)

- Vice President:

Al Gore (D-Tennessee) (until January 20)
Dick Cheney (R-Wyoming) (starting January 20)

- Chief Justice: William Rehnquist (Virginia)
- Speaker of the House of Representatives: Dennis Hastert (R-Illinois)
- Senate Majority Leader:

Trent Lott (R-Mississippi) (until January 3)
Tom Daschle (D-South Dakota) (January 3–20)
Trent Lott (R-Mississippi) (January 20 – June 6)
Tom Daschle (D-South Dakota) (starting June 6)

- Congress: 106th (until January 3), 107th (starting January 3)

==== State governments ====
Governors and lieutenant governors

=== Governors ===
- Governor of Alabama: Don Siegelman (Democratic)
- Governor of Alaska: Tony Knowles (Democratic)
- Governor of Arizona: Jane Dee Hull (Republican)
- Governor of Arkansas: Mike Huckabee (Republican)
- Governor of California: Gray Davis (Democratic)
- Governor of Colorado: Bill Owens (Republican)
- Governor of Connecticut: John G. Rowland (Republican)
- Governor of Delaware: Thomas R. Carper (Democratic) (until January 3), Ruth Ann Minner (Democratic) (starting January 3)
- Governor of Florida: Jeb Bush (Republican)
- Governor of Georgia: Roy Barnes (Democratic)
- Governor of Hawaii: Ben Cayetano (Democratic)
- Governor of Idaho: Dirk Kempthorne (Republican)
- Governor of Illinois: George Ryan (Republican)
- Governor of Indiana: Frank O'Bannon (Democratic)
- Governor of Iowa: Tom Vilsack (Democratic)
- Governor of Kansas: Bill Graves (Republican)
- Governor of Kentucky: Paul E. Patton (Democratic)
- Governor of Louisiana: Murphy J. Foster, Jr. (Republican)
- Governor of Maine: Angus King (Independent)
- Governor of Maryland: Parris N. Glendening (Democratic)
- Governor of Massachusetts: Paul Cellucci (Republican) (until April 10), Jane Swift (Republican) (starting April 10)
- Governor of Michigan: John Engler (Republican)
- Governor of Minnesota: Jesse Ventura (Independence)
- Governor of Mississippi: Ronnie Musgrove (Democratic)
- Governor of Missouri: Roger B. Wilson (Democratic) (until January 8), Bob Holden (Democratic) (starting January 8)
- Governor of Montana: Marc Racicot (Republican) (until January 1), Judy Martz (Republican) (starting January 1)
- Governor of Nebraska: Mike Johanns (Republican)
- Governor of Nevada: Kenny Guinn (Republican)
- Governor of New Hampshire: Jeanne Shaheen (Democratic)
- Governor of New Jersey: Christine Todd Whitman (Republican) (until January 31), Donald DiFrancesco (Republican) (starting January 31)
- Governor of New Mexico: Gary Johnson (Republican)
- Governor of New York: George Pataki (Republican)
- Governor of North Carolina: Jim Hunt (Democratic) (until January 6), Mike Easley (Democratic) (starting January 6)
- Governor of North Dakota: John Hoeven (Republican)
- Governor of Ohio: Bob Taft (Republican)
- Governor of Oklahoma: Frank Keating (Republican)
- Governor of Oregon: John Kitzhaber (Democratic)
- Governor of Pennsylvania: Tom Ridge (Republican) (until October 5), Mark S. Schweiker (Republican) (starting October 5)
- Governor of Rhode Island: Lincoln C. Almond (Republican)
- Governor of South Carolina: Jim Hodges (Democratic)
- Governor of South Dakota: William J. Janklow (Republican)
- Governor of Tennessee: Don Sundquist (Republican)
- Governor of Texas: Rick Perry (Republican)
- Governor of Utah: Mike Leavitt (Republican)
- Governor of Vermont: Howard Dean (Democratic)
- Governor of Virginia: Jim Gilmore (Republican)
- Governor of Washington: Gary Locke (Democratic)
- Governor of West Virginia: Cecil H. Underwood (Republican) (until January 15), Bob Wise (Democratic) (starting January 15)
- Governor of Wisconsin: Tommy Thompson (Republican) (until February 1), Scott McCallum (Republican) (starting February 1)
- Governor of Wyoming: Jim Geringer (Republican)

=== Lieutenant governors ===
- Lieutenant Governor of Alabama: Steve Windom (Republican)
- Lieutenant Governor of Alaska: Fran Ulmer (Democratic)
- Lieutenant Governor of Arkansas: Winthrop Paul Rockefeller (Republican)
- Lieutenant Governor of California: Cruz Bustamante (Democratic)
- Lieutenant Governor of Colorado: Joe Rogers (Republican)
- Lieutenant Governor of Connecticut: Jodi Rell (Republican)
- Lieutenant Governor of Delaware:
  - until January 3: Ruth Ann Minner (Democratic)
  - January 3-16: vacant
  - starting January 16: John Carney (Democratic)
- Lieutenant Governor of Florida: Frank Brogan (Republican)
- Lieutenant Governor of Georgia: Mark Taylor (Democratic)
- Lieutenant Governor of Hawaii: Mazie Hirono (Democratic)
- Lieutenant Governor of Idaho:
  - until January 3: Butch Otter (Republican)
  - January 3-30: vacant
  - starting January 30: Jack Riggs (Republican)
- Lieutenant Governor of Illinois: Corinne Wood (Republican)
- Lieutenant Governor of Indiana: Joe E. Kernan (Democratic)
- Lieutenant Governor of Iowa: Sally Pederson (Democratic)
- Lieutenant Governor of Kansas: Gary Sherrer (Republican)
- Lieutenant Governor of Kentucky: Steve Henry (Democratic)
- Lieutenant Governor of Louisiana: Kathleen Blanco (Democratic)
- Lieutenant Governor of Maryland: Kathleen Kennedy Townsend (Democratic)
- Lieutenant Governor of Massachusetts: Jane Swift (Republican)
- Lieutenant Governor of Michigan: Dick Posthumus (Republican)
- Lieutenant Governor of Minnesota: Mae Schunk (Independence)
- Lieutenant Governor of Mississippi: Amy Tuck (Democratic)
- Lieutenant Governor of Missouri: Joe Maxwell (Democratic)
- Lieutenant Governor of Montana: Judy Martz (Republican) (until January 1), Karl Ohs (Republican) (starting January 1)
- Lieutenant Governor of Nebraska: David I. Maurstad (Republican) (until October 1), Dave Heineman (Republican) (starting October 1)
- Lieutenant Governor of Nevada: Lorraine Hunt (Republican)
- Lieutenant Governor of New Mexico: Walter Dwight Bradley (Republican)
- Lieutenant Governor of New York: Mary Donohue (Republican)
- Lieutenant Governor of North Carolina: Dennis A. Wicker (Democratic) (until January 6), Bev Perdue (Democratic) (starting January 6)
- Lieutenant Governor of North Dakota: Jack Dalrymple (Republican)
- Lieutenant Governor of Ohio: Maureen O'Connor (Republican)
- Lieutenant Governor of Oklahoma: Mary Fallin (Republican)
- Lieutenant Governor of Pennsylvania: Mark S. Schweiker (Republican) (until October 5), Robert Jubelirer (Republican) (starting October 5)
- Lieutenant Governor of Rhode Island: Charles J. Fogarty (Democratic)
- Lieutenant Governor of South Carolina: Bob Peeler (Republican)
- Lieutenant Governor of South Dakota: Carole Hillard (Republican)
- Lieutenant Governor of Tennessee: John S. Wilder (Democratic)
- Lieutenant Governor of Texas: Bill Ratliff (Republican)
- Lieutenant Governor of Utah: Olene S. Walker (Republican)
- Lieutenant Governor of Vermont: Doug Racine (Democratic)
- Lieutenant Governor of Virginia: John H. Hager (Republican)
- Lieutenant Governor of Washington: Brad Owen (Democratic)
- Lieutenant Governor of Wisconsin:
  - until February 1: Scott McCallum (Republican)
  - February 1-May 9: vacant
  - starting May 9: Margaret A. Farrow (Republican)

== Events ==
=== January ===
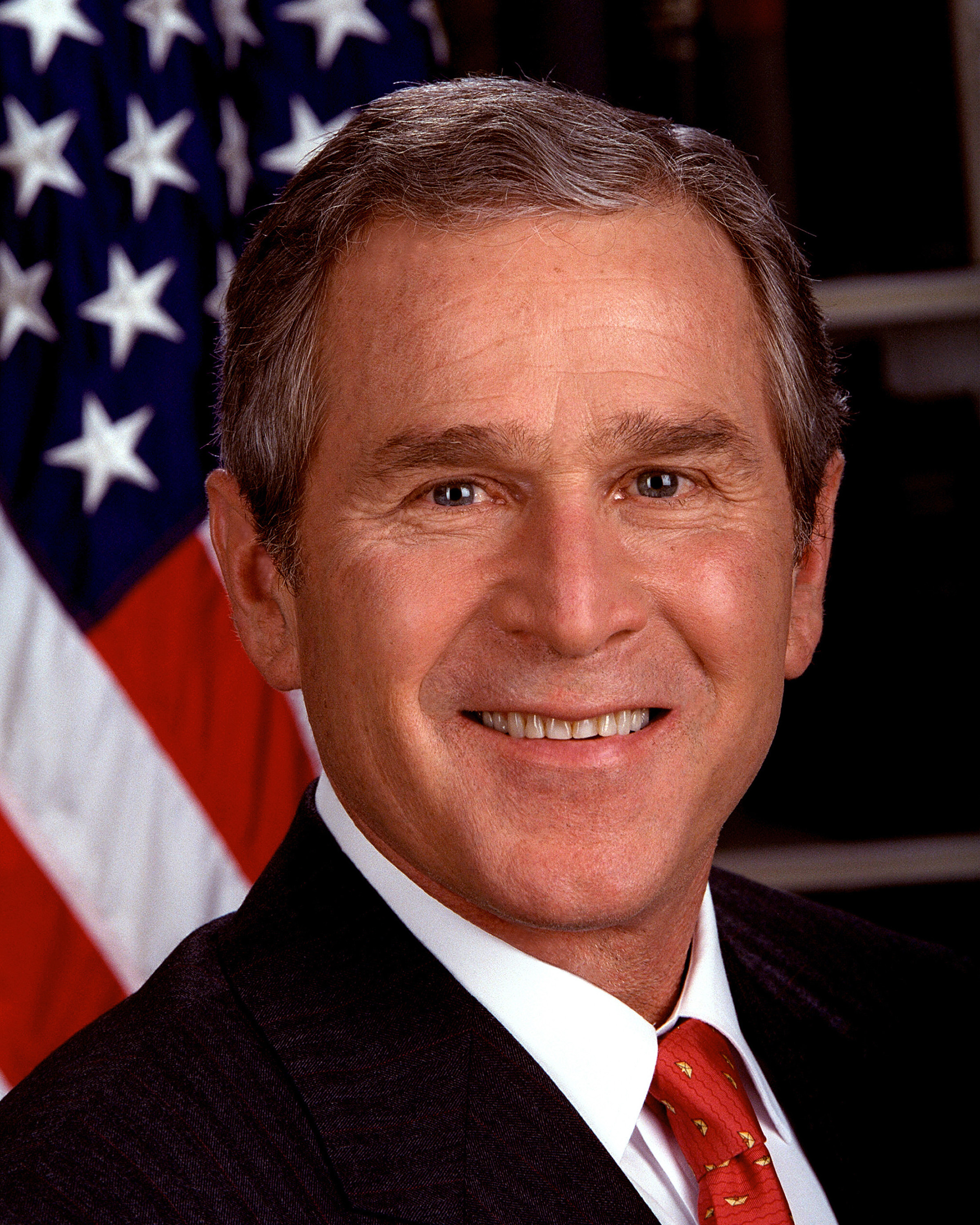
January 20: George W. Bush becomes the 43rd U.S. president

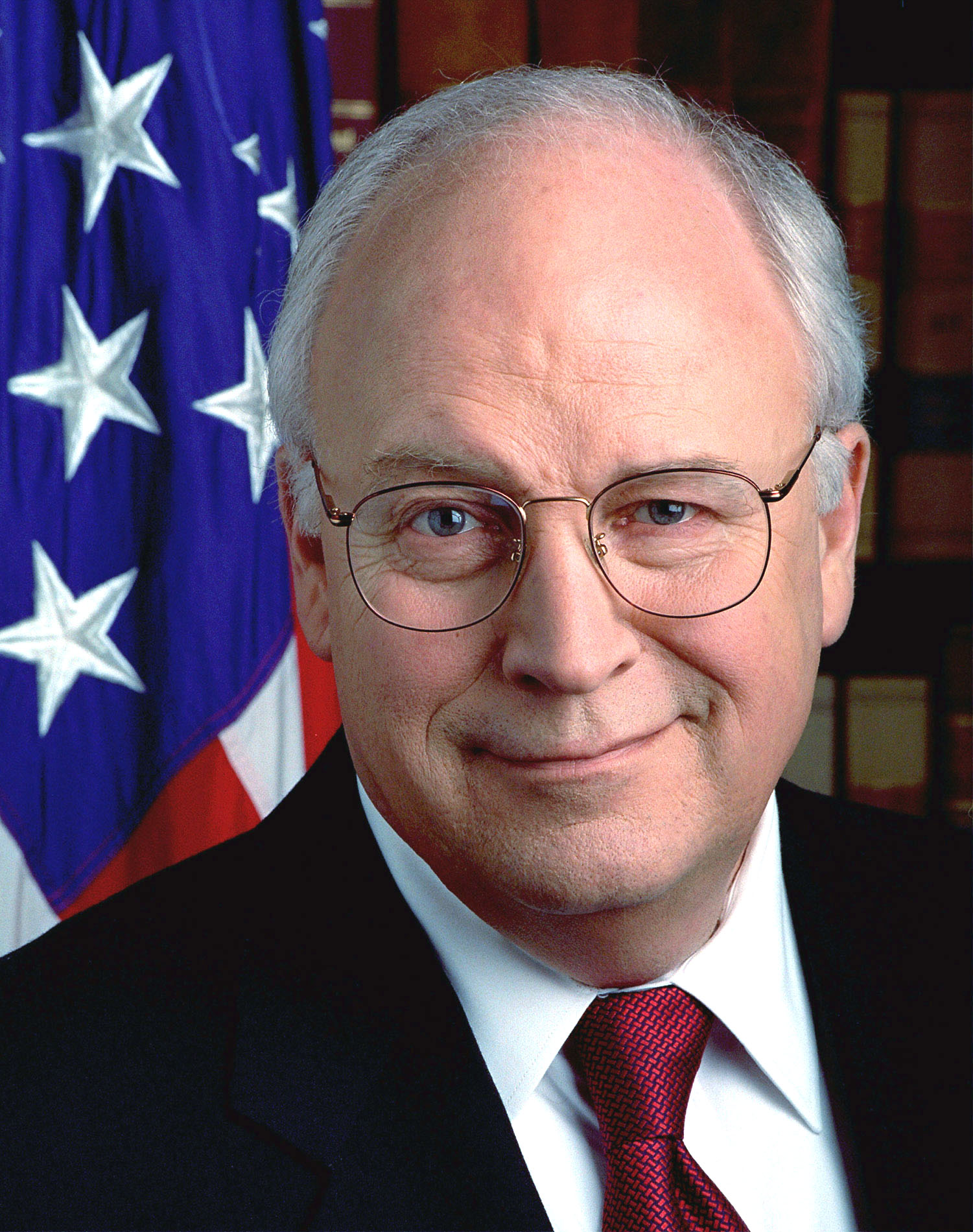
January 20: Dick Cheney becomes the 46th U.S. vice president

- January 1 – A black monolith measuring 270 cm (8.9 ft) tall appears in Seattle's Magnuson Park, placed by an anonymous artist in reference to the monolith from the movie 2001: A Space Odyssey.
- January 2 – Sila Calderón becomes the first female governor of US territory Puerto Rico.
- January 7 – Extreme Championship Wrestling holds its Guilty as Charged pay-per-view event from the Hammerstein Ballroom in New York, New York. This is the final ECW event held before the company files for bankruptcy two months later.
- January 10 – Nevada County shootings: In Nevada County, California, 40-year-old Scott Harlan Thorpe kills three people in a shooting spree. He is later found incompetent to stand trial and declared not guilty by reason of insanity.
- January 11 – The U.S. Federal Trade Commission approves the merger of America Online and Time Warner to form AOL Time Warner.
- January 14 – World Championship Wrestling holds its Sin pay-per-view event from the Conseco Fieldhouse in Indianapolis, Indiana.
- January 15
  - UK children's stop motion animated series Bob the Builder starts its American debut for the first time on Nick Jr.
  - Wikipedia is launched.
- January 16
  - President Bill Clinton awards former U.S. President Theodore Roosevelt a posthumous Medal of Honor for his service during the Spanish–American War; 11 of Roosevelt's descendants accept on his behalf.
  - A man drives a semi-trailer truck into the side of the California State Capitol building, killing the driver and damaging the building's interior.
- January 18 – President Bill Clinton delivers his farewell address to the nation.
- January 20 – George W. Bush is sworn in as the 43rd president of the United States, and Dick Cheney is sworn in as the 46th vice president.
- January 21 – The World Wrestling Federation holds its Royal Rumble pay-per-view event from the New Orleans Arena in New Orleans, Louisiana.
- January 22–24 – The "Texas Seven", a group of convicts who escaped from the John B. Connally Unit in Texas, are found in Colorado.
- January 26 – Lacrosse player and coach Diane Whipple is killed by two Presa Canarios named Bane and Hera, owned by her neighbors and attorneys Marjorie Knoller and Robert Noel.
- January 28 – Super Bowl XXXV: The Baltimore Ravens defeat the New York Giants at Raymond James Stadium in Tampa 34–7, winning their first Super Bowl title.

=== February ===
- February 9 – The submarine USS Greeneville (SSN-772) strikes and sinks the Japanese fishing vessel Ehime-Maru near Hawaii.
- February 16 – Iraq disarmament crisis: British and U.S. forces carry out bombing raids, attempting to disable Iraq's air defense network.
- February 18
  - NASCAR legend Dale Earnhardt dies in a last lap crash in the 43rd annual Daytona 500.
  - FBI agent Robert Hanssen is arrested and charged with spying for Russia for 15 years.
  - World Championship Wrestling holds its SuperBrawl Revenge pay-per-view event from the Nashville Municipal Auditorium in Nashville, Tennessee.
- February 19 – An Oklahoma City bombing museum is dedicated at the Oklahoma City National Memorial.
- February 23 – Isla Vista massacre: In Isla Vista, California, David Attias drives a car into five pedestrians, killing four and critically injuring one. He is later convicted of murder and declared legally insane.
- February 25 – The World Wrestling Federation holds its No Way Out pay-per-view event from the Thomas & Mack Center in Paradise, Nevada.
- February 27 – President Bush delivers his first address to the 107th Congress.
- February 28 – The 6.8 M_{w} Nisqually earthquake shook the Puget Sound region of western Washington with a maximum Mercalli intensity of VIII (Severe), causing 1 death, 400 injuries, and 1 to US$4 billion in losses.

=== March ===
- March – The United States enters the early 2000s recession; the unemployment rate rises to 4.4%.
- March 18 – World Championship Wrestling holds its pay-per-view event Greed from the Jacksonville Memorial Coliseum in Jacksonville, Florida, which turns out to be the company's final pay-per-view event before it is purchased by the World Wrestling Federation days later.
- March 23 – The World Wrestling Federation purchases its competitor, World Championship Wrestling from AOL Time Warner for $2.5 million, ending the Monday Night War.
- March 24 – Apple Computer releases the Mac OS X next-generation operating system, with version 10.0. It goes on to be the second-most used desktop operating system with a market share of roughly 10 percent.
- March 25 – The 73rd Academy Awards, hosted by Steve Martin, are held at Shrine Auditorium in Los Angeles, with Ridley Scott's Gladiator winning five awards out of 12 nominations, including Best Picture. Steven Soderbergh is nominated twice for Best Director, winning for Traffic. The telecast garners 42.9 million viewers.
- March 28 – The Bush administration withdraws U.S. support for the 1997 Kyoto Protocol on the reduction of greenhouse gases.
- March 30 – The Fairly OddParents and Invader Zim debuts on Nickelodeon.

=== April ===
- April 1
  - A Chinese fighter jet collides with a U.S. EP-3E surveillance aircraft, forcing it to make an emergency landing in Hainan, China. The U.S. crew is detained for 10 days, and the F-8 Chinese pilot goes missing and is presumed dead.
  - The World Wrestling Federation holds WrestleMania X-Seven at the Reliant Astrodome in Houston, Texas, drawing a record crowd of 67,925.
- April 7 – Timothy Thomas, a 19-year-old African-American, is shot by a police officer in Cincinnati, sparking riots in downtown Cincinnati from April 10 to April 12.
- April 17 – The 2001 Mississippi flag referendum occurred, 64.39% of the population voted to formally adopt the 1894 U.S. state flag over the new 2001 proposed state flag design.
- April 19 – The multiple Tony Award-winning musical The Producers by Mel Brooks and Thomas Meehan, starring Nathan Lane and Matthew Broderick, opens on Broadway at the St. James Theatre.
- April 21 – The small Kansas town of Hoisington is hit by an F4 tornado, destroying one-third of the city and killing one.
- April 28 – Soyuz TM-32 lifts off from the Baikonur Cosmodrome, carrying the first space tourist, American Dennis Tito.
- April 29 – The World Wrestling Federation holds its Backlash pay-per-view event from the Allstate Arena in Rosemont, Illinois.

=== May ===
- May 6 – Space tourist Dennis Tito returns to Earth aboard Soyuz TM-31. (Soyuz TM-32 is left docked at the International Space Station as a new lifeboat.)
- May 18 – Shrek is released in theaters.
- May 20 – The World Wrestling Federation holds its Judgment Day pay-per-view event from the ARCO Arena in Sacramento, California.

=== June ===
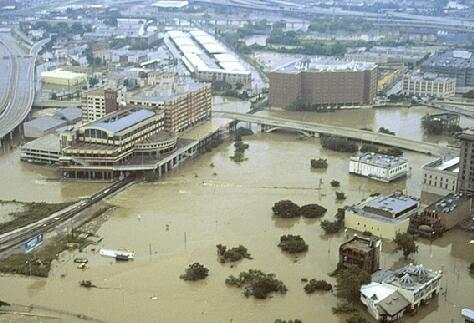
June 5–9: Flooding in Houston from Tropical Storm Allison

- June 5 – U.S. Senator Jim Jeffords leaves the Republican Party, an act which changes control of the United States Senate from the Republican Party to the Democratic Party.
- June 5–9 – Tropical Storm Allison produces 36 inches (900 mm) of rain in Houston, Texas, killing 22, damaging the Texas Medical Center, and causing more than US$5 billion of damage.
- June 7 – The Economic Growth and Tax Relief Reconciliation Act of 2001 is signed into law by U.S. President George W. Bush, the first of a series of acts which becomes known as the Bush tax cuts.
- June 9 – The Colorado Avalanche wins their second Stanley Cup, and Ray Bourque wins his first Cup after a lengthy career.
- June 11 – In Terre Haute, Indiana, Timothy McVeigh is executed for the Oklahoma City bombing.
- June 15
  - Walt Disney Pictures' 41st feature film, Atlantis: The Lost Empire, is released. Though reception is mixed and it performs modestly at the box office, it has since become a cult favorite among fans due in part to the visual influence of comics artist Mike Mignola.
  - The Los Angeles Lakers defeat the Philadelphia 76ers in the 2001 NBA Finals in five games for their second consecutive NBA championship.
- June 19 – A missile hits a soccer field in Tal Afar, Iraq, killing 23 and wounding 11. The Iraqi government claims it was an American-British airstrike; U.S. officials say it was actually an Iraqi missile that malfunctioned.
- June 20 – Andrea Yates drowns her five children in a bath tub in Houston, Texas.
- June 24 – The World Wrestling Federation holds its King of the Ring pay-per-view event from the Continental Airlines Arena in East Rutherford, New Jersey.

=== July ===
- July 9 – The Thirty Mile Fire ignites in Okanogan County, Washington. Four firefighters die while battling the blaze.
- July 16 – The FBI arrests Dmitry Sklyarov at a convention in Las Vegas, Nevada, for violating a provision of the Digital Millennium Copyright Act (DMCA).
- July 18 – In Baltimore, Maryland, a 60-car train derailment occurs in a tunnel, sparking a fire that lasts days and virtually shuts down downtown Baltimore.
- July 22 – The World Wrestling Federation holds its Invasion pay-per-view event from the Gund Arena in Cleveland, Ohio.

=== August ===
- August 1 – Alabama Supreme Court Chief Justice Roy Moore has a 2.5-short-ton (2,300 kg) monument of the Ten Commandments installed in the Rotunda of the Judiciary Building. He is later sued to have it removed, and is eventually removed from office.
- August 2 – The House of Representatives approves oil exploration in the Alaskan Arctic National Wildlife Refuge.
- August 5 – Having acquired the Jim Henson Company's interest in the Odyssey cable network the previous year, Crown Media Holdings rebrands Odyssey as the Hallmark Channel, after Crown Media's corporate parent Hallmark Cards. The Hallmark Channel branding continues to this day.
- August 9 – President Bush announces his limited support for federal funding of research on embryonic stem cells.
- August 19 – The World Wrestling Federation holds its SummerSlam pay-per-view event from the Compaq Center at San Jose in San Jose, California.
- August 25 – U.S. singer Aaliyah dies in a plane crash in the Bahamas.
- August 28 – The U.S. governors of New England agree with the Quebec and Atlantic Canadian premiers to the Climate Change Action Plan 2001.

=== September ===
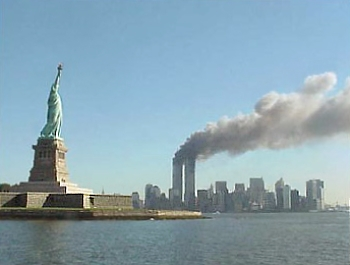
September 11: September 11 attacks

- September 1 – The libertarian Free State Project is founded at Yale University.
- September 2 – Adult Swim, an adult-oriented programming block, debuts on its Turner sister cable channel Cartoon Network.
- September 4 – Robert Mueller becomes the FBI's director.
- September 5 – The piece As Slow as Possible, composed by John Cage, begins. It will last 639 years, finishing in the year 2640.
- September 6 – United States v. Microsoft Corp.: The United States Justice Department announces that it no longer seeks to break up software maker Microsoft, and will instead seek a lesser antitrust penalty.
- September 10 – Donald Rumsfeld gives a speech regarding $2.3 trillion in Pentagon spending that cannot be accounted for, identifying the bureaucratic processes of the Pentagon as the biggest threat to America.

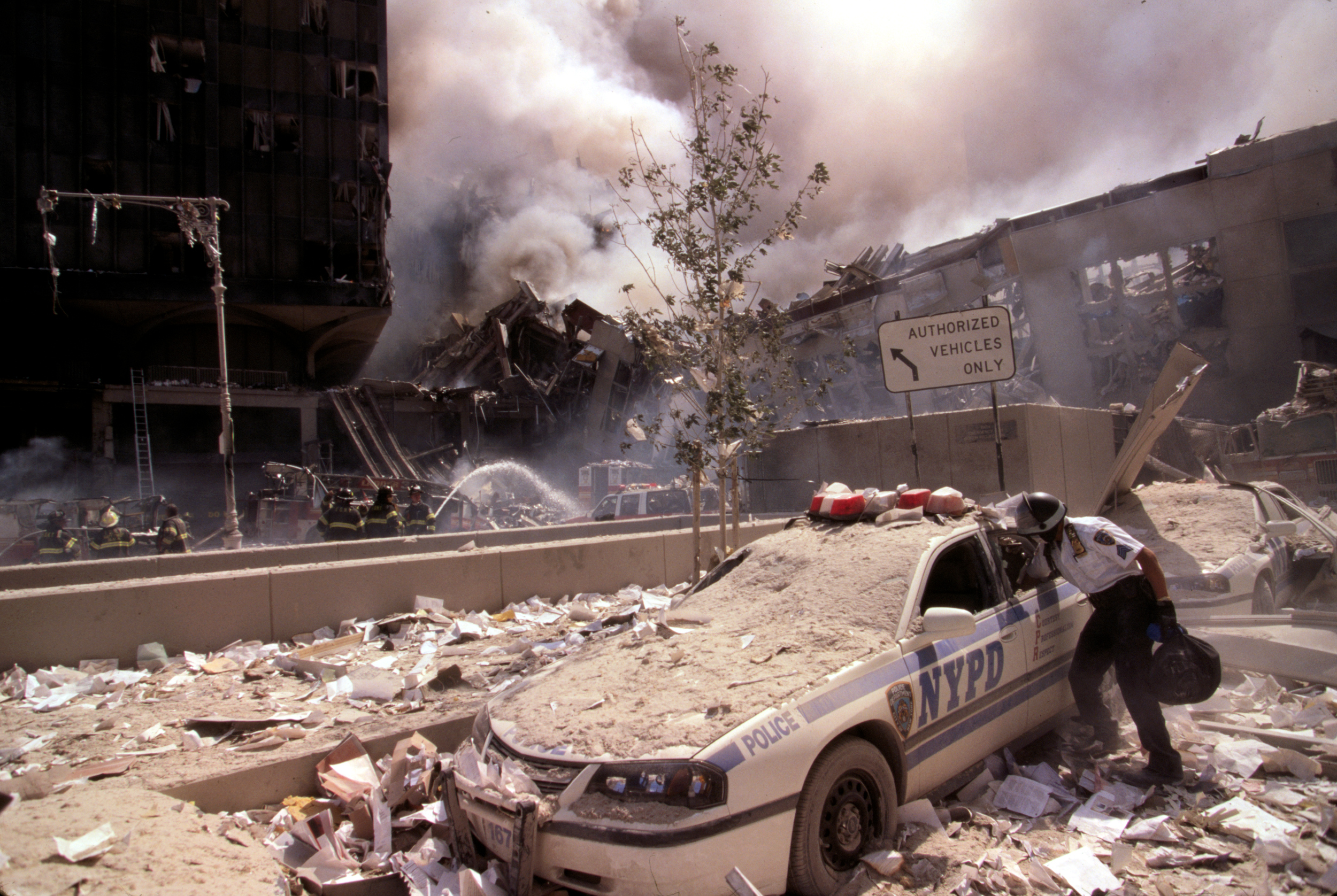
New York fire department personnel examining a smashed New York City police car, during 9/11.

- September 11 – September 11 attacks: Almost 3,000 people are killed in four suicide attacks at the World Trade Center (WTC) in New York City (NYC); the Pentagon in Arlington, Virginia; and in rural Shanksville, Pennsylvania. The attack launches the global war on terrorism.
- September 15 – The Queen Isabella Causeway in Texas collapses after being hit by a tugboat, killing eight.
- September 17 – The New York Stock Exchange reopens for trading after the September 11 attacks, the longest closure since the Great Depression.
- September 18 – The 2001 anthrax attacks commence as letters containing anthrax spores are mailed from Princeton, New Jersey, to ABC News, CBS News, NBC News, the New York Post, and the National Enquirer. Twenty-two people in total are exposed, with five resulting fatalities.
- September 20 – President Bush delivers a speech to a joint session of Congress, announcing the investigation into the September 11 attacks.
- September 21 – America: A Tribute to Heroes is broadcast by over 35 network and cable channels, raising over $200 million for the victims of the September 11 attacks.
- September 23 – The World Wrestling Federation holds its Unforgiven pay-per-view event from the Mellon Arena in Pittsburgh, Pennsylvania.

=== October ===
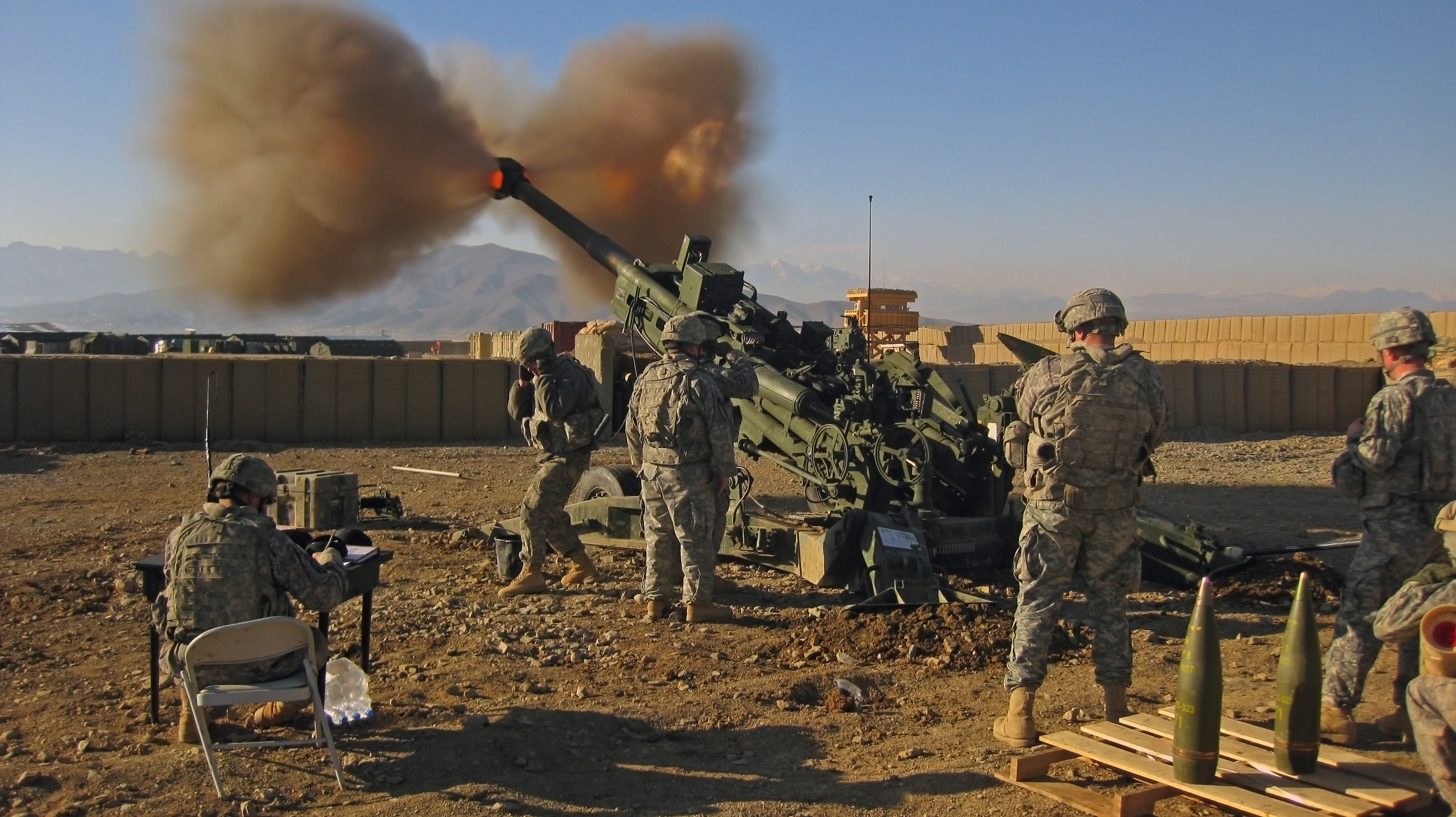
October 7: The War in Afghanistan begins

October 26: President George W. Bush signs the USA PATRIOT Act

- October 3 – 2001 Greyhound bus attack: A passenger slits the throat of the driver, causing the bus to crash near Manchester, Tennessee, killing seven people.
- October 5 – Barry Bonds of the San Francisco Giants breaks the single season home run record, with his 71st and 72nd home runs of the year.
- October 7 – The United States invades Afghanistan, accompanied by other nations participating in Operation Enduring Freedom.
- October 8 – U.S. President George W. Bush announces the establishment of the Office of Homeland Security.
- October 9 – The 2001 anthrax attacks continue as contaminated letters are mailed from Princeton, New Jersey, to U.S. Senators Tom Daschle of South Dakota and Patrick Leahy of Vermont.
- October 15 – NASA's Galileo spacecraft passes within 112 miles (180 km) of Jupiter's moon Io.
- October 21 – The World Wrestling Federation holds its No Mercy pay-per-view event from the Savvis Center in St. Louis, Missouri.
- October 23 – Apple releases the first iPod in the United States, revolutionizing the way people listen to music.
- October 25 – Microsoft releases Windows XP to the public.
- October 26 – U.S. President George W. Bush signs the USA PATRIOT Act into law.
- October 30 – Michael Jackson releases the album Invincible, it was his last studio album to be released during his lifetime before his death; 8 years later in June 2009.

=== November ===
- November 1 – The New York Yankees defeat the Arizona Diamondbacks in Game 4 of the 2001 World Series to tie the series at 2 in the first World Series game to be played in the month of November. Derek Jeter's walk-off home run in the bottom of the 10th earns him the nickname "Mr. November".
- November 2 – Pixar Animation Studios' fourth feature film, Monsters, Inc., is released in theaters.
- November 4 – The Arizona Diamondbacks defeat the New York Yankees in seven games to win their first World Series in franchise history.
- November 5 – Andrew Bagby is murdered in Keystone State Park, Pennsylvania by his former partner Shirley Jane Turner. While awaiting trial and extraction from Canada, she gained custody of the couple's son who she then also murdered. The deaths later became the basis for the 2008 documentary Dear Zachary.
- November 9 – Kellie Pickler and Aaron Tippin in a state in United States of America.
- November 12 – In New York City, American Airlines Flight 587, headed to the Dominican Republic, crashes in Queens just minutes after takeoff from the John F. Kennedy International Airport, killing all 260 on board and five on the ground.
- November 13 – War on terror: In the first such act since World War II, U.S. President George W. Bush signs an executive order allowing military tribunals against any foreigners suspected of having connections to terrorist acts or planned acts against the United States.
- November 15 – Microsoft releases its first video game console: the Xbox.
- November 16 – Harry Potter and the Sorcerer's Stone, directed by Chris Columbus is released in theaters as the first film of the Harry Potter film series.
- November 18
  - Nintendo releases the Nintendo GameCube in North America.
  - The World Wrestling Federation holds its Survivor Series pay-per-view event from the Greensboro Coliseum Complex in Greensboro, North Carolina.
- November 29 – English musician, singer, songwriter, music and film producer, and former The Beatles member George Harrison dies of lung cancer in Los Angeles.
- November 30 – Gary Ridgway, a.k.a. The Green River Killer, is arrested outside the truck factory where he had worked in Renton, Washington. His arrest marks the end of one of the longest running homicide investigations in US history.

=== December ===
- December – The unemployment rate rises to 5.7%, the highest since January 1996; the early 2000s recession ends.
- December 1 – The last Trans World Airlines flight lands at St. Louis International Airport, following TWA's purchase by American Airlines.
- December 2 – Enron files for Chapter 11 bankruptcy protection five days after Dynegy cancels a US$8.4 billion buyout bid. Enron's bankruptcy becomes the largest in U.S. history.
- December 3 – Officials announce that one of the Taliban prisoners captured after the prison uprising at Mazari Sharif, Afghanistan is John Walker Lindh, an American citizen.
- December 9 – The World Wrestling Federation holds its Vengeance pay-per-view event from the San Diego Sports Arena in San Diego, California.
- December 11
  - The United States government indicts Zacarias Moussaoui for involvement in the September 11 attacks.
  - The United States Customs Service raids members of international software piracy group DrinkOrDie in Operation Buccaneer.
- December 13 – U.S. President George W. Bush announces the United States' withdrawal from the 1972 Anti-Ballistic Missile Treaty.
- December 16 – Cleveland Browns fans riot by throwing bottles after the team's 15–10 loss to the Jacksonville Jaguars following a controversial call by the referees regarding a fourth-down pass from Tim Couch.
- December 19 – The Lord of the Rings: The Fellowship of the Ring, directed by Peter Jackson, is released in theaters as the first film of The Lord of the Rings film series.
- December 22 – A flight from Paris, France to Miami, Florida is diverted to Boston, Massachusetts after passenger Richard Reid attempts to detonate explosives hidden in his shoes.
- December 27 – The People's Republic of China is granted permanent normal trade status with the United States.

=== Ongoing ===
- Iraqi no-fly zones (1991–2003)
- War in Afghanistan (2001–2021)

== Births ==
=== January ===
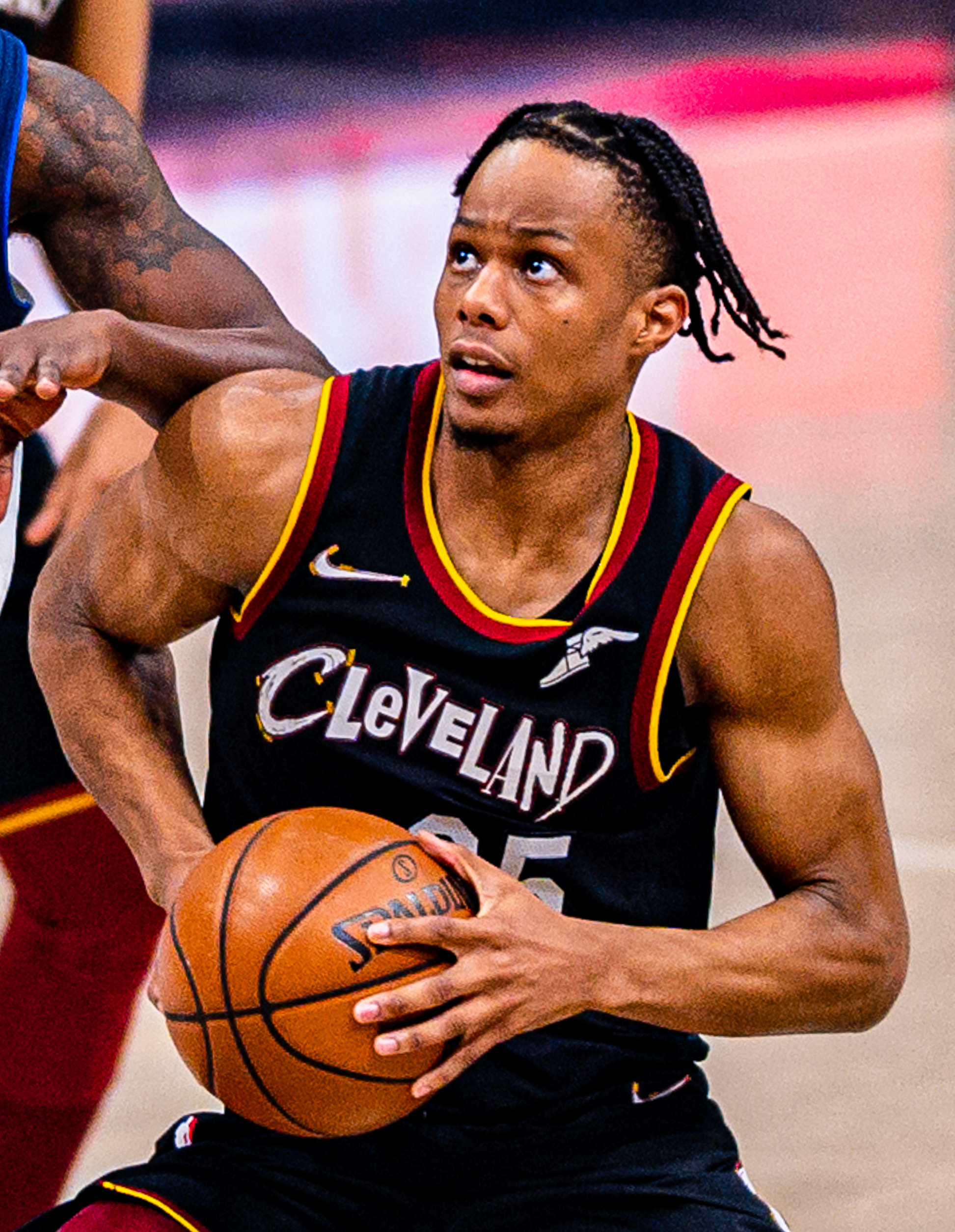
Isaac Okoro

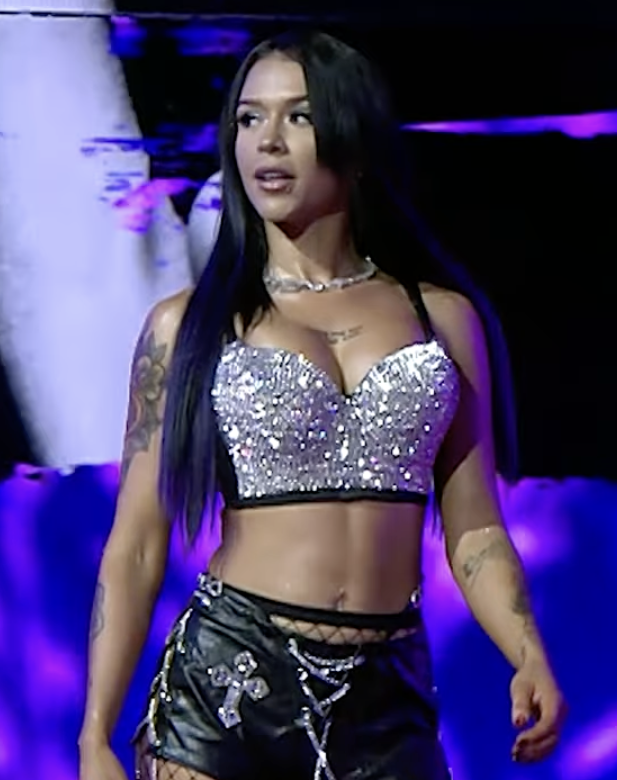
Elayna Black

- January 6 – Kenyon Martin Jr., basketball player
- January 8 – Kaash Paige, singer
- January 12 – Jena Rose, pop singer
- January 13 – Emily Grace Reaves, actress
- January 14 – Elayna Black, professional wrestler
- January 21 – Jackson Brundage, actor
- January 26 – Isaac Okoro, basketball player
- January 30 – Alex Wind, activist

=== February ===
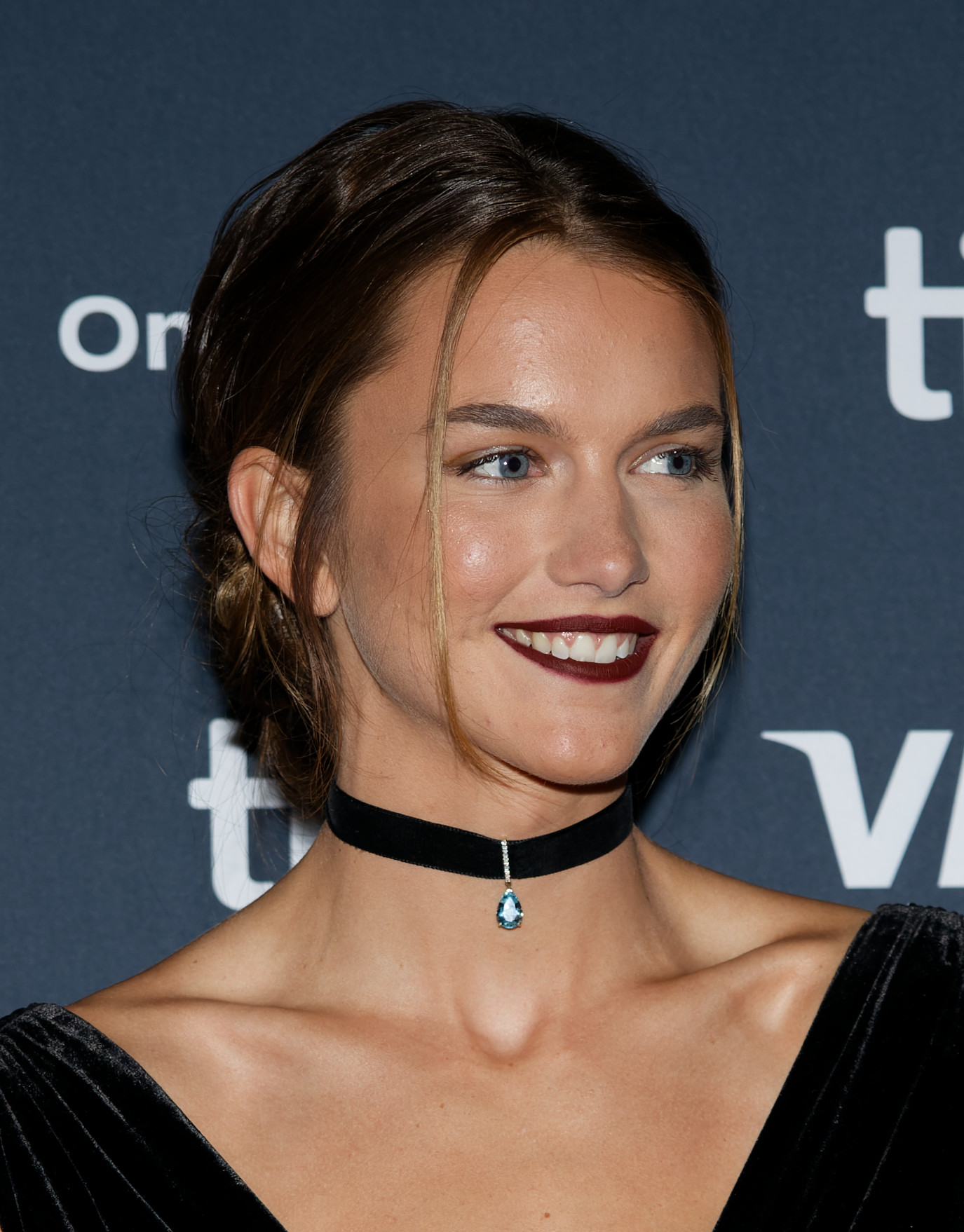
Chloe East

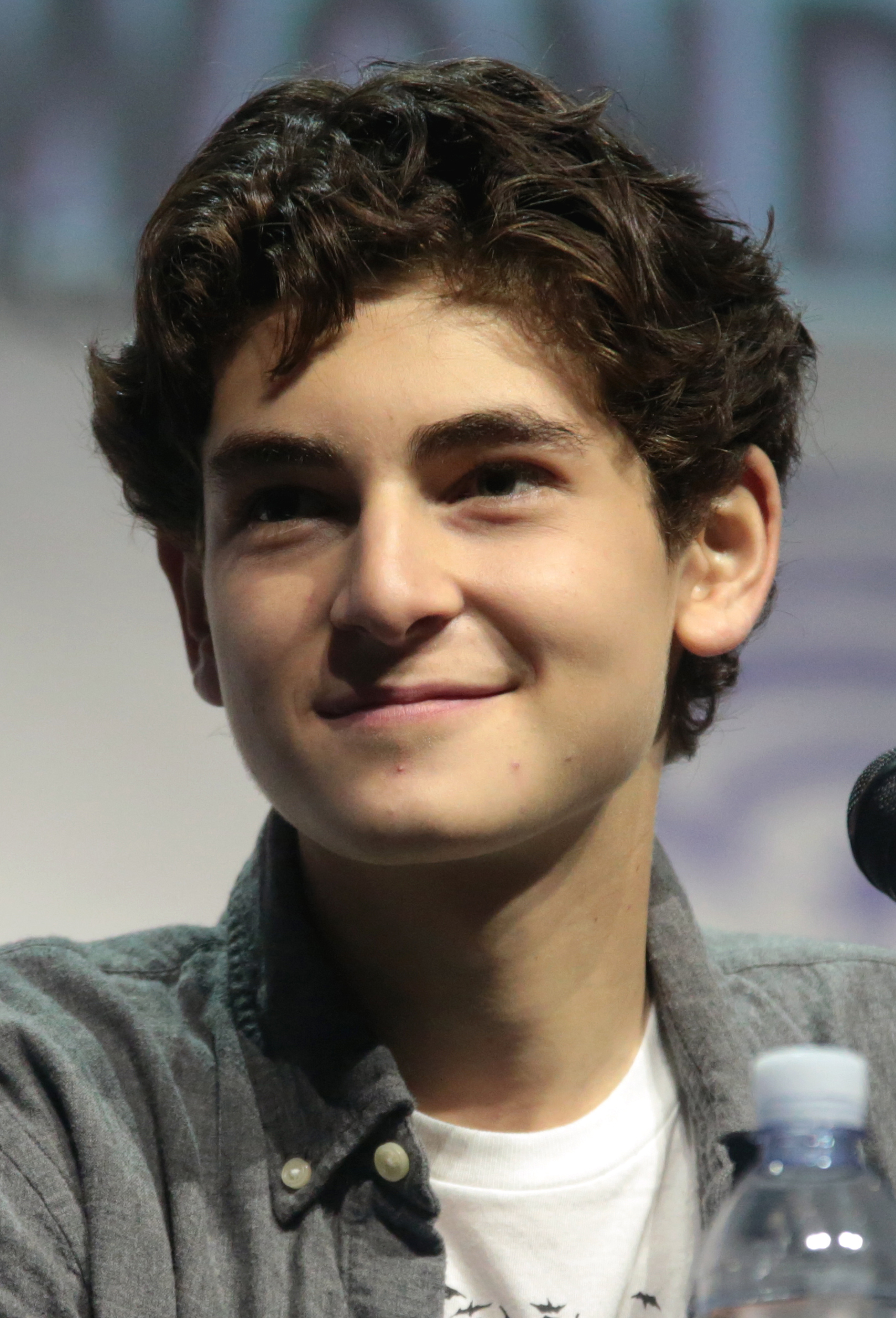
David Mazouz

- February 2 – Connor Gibbs, actor
- February 8 – Jaden Hossler, singer
- February 15 – Haley Tju, actress
- February 16 – Chloe East, actress
- February 19 – David Mazouz, actor
- February 21
  - Isabella Acres, actress
  - Jagger Eaton, skateboarder

=== March ===
Inde Navarrette

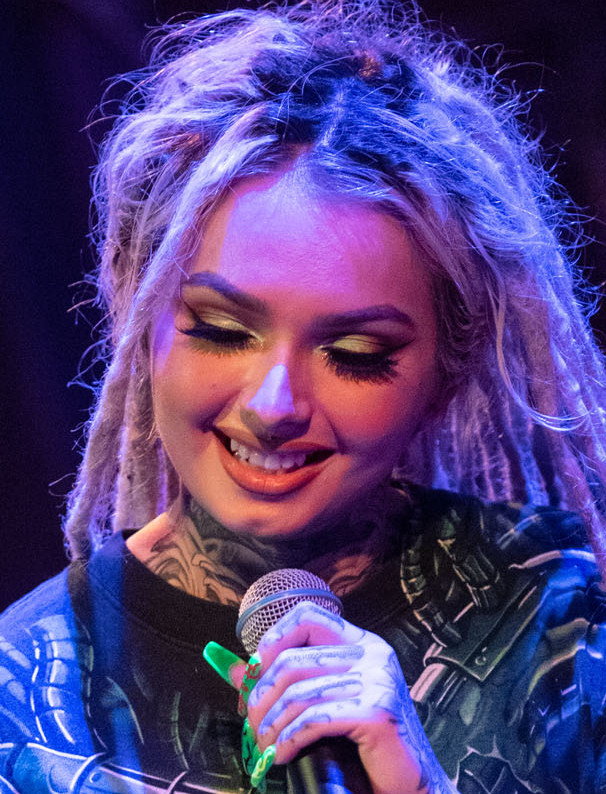
Zhavia Ward

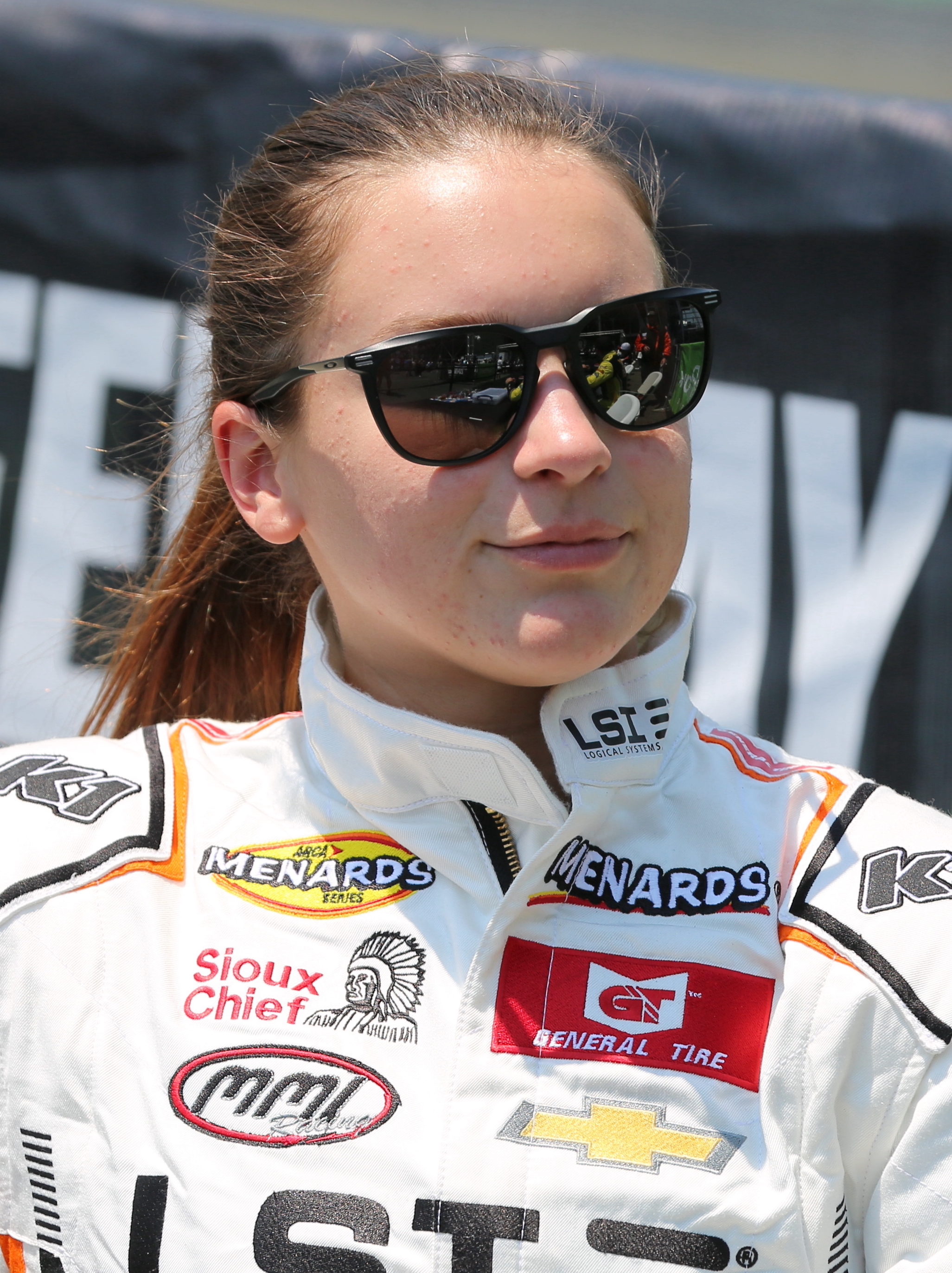
Kaylee Bryson

- March 3 – Inde Navarrette, actress
- March 6
  - Milo Manheim, actor
  - Zhavia Ward, singer-songwriter
- March 10 – Alyssa Carson, space enthusiast and undergraduate student
- March 11 – Kaylee Bryson, race car driver
- March 22 – Aalayah Eastmond, activist
- March 31
  - Noah Urrea singer, actor, and model
  - James Wiseman, basketball player

=== April ===
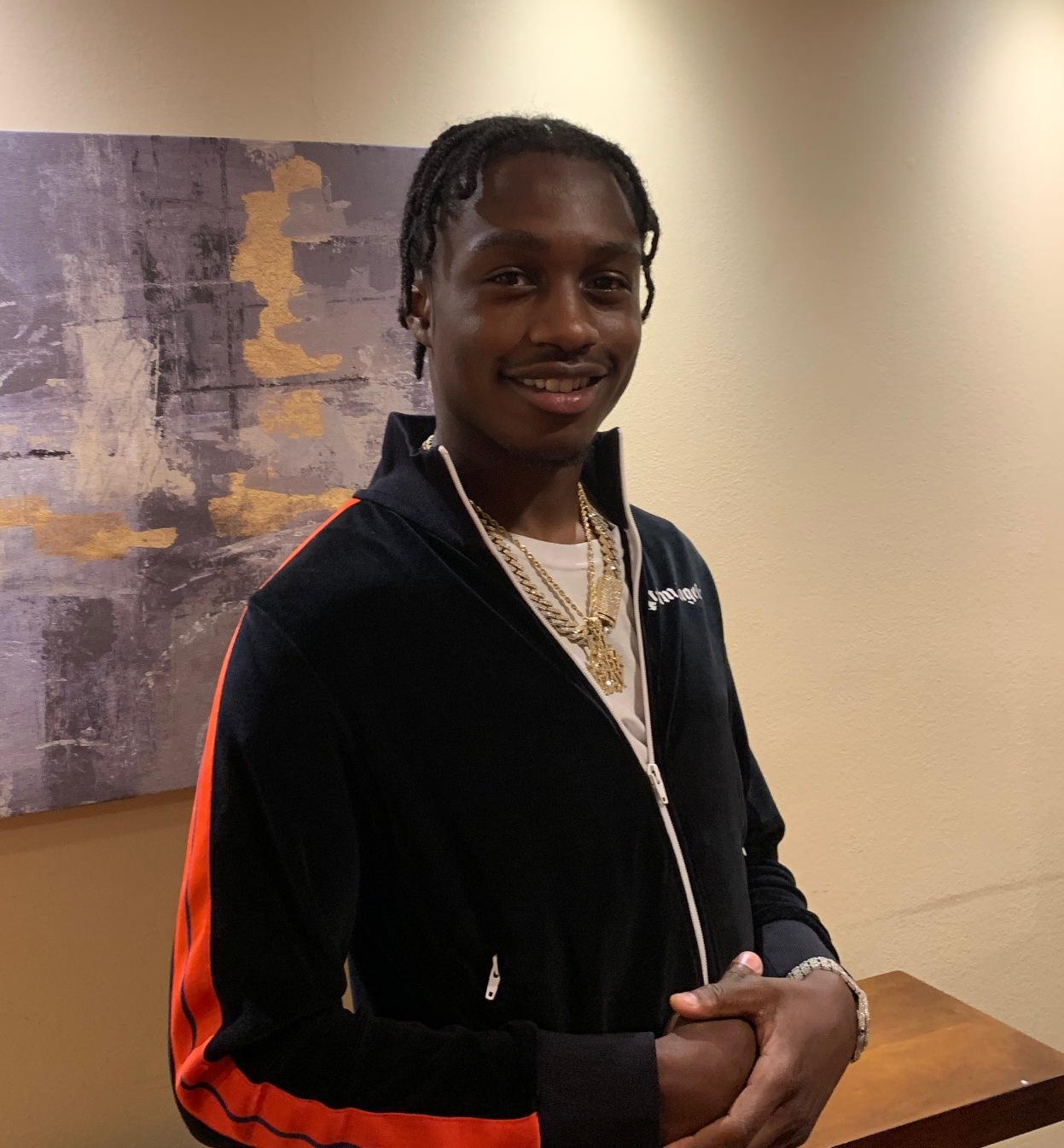
Lil Tjay

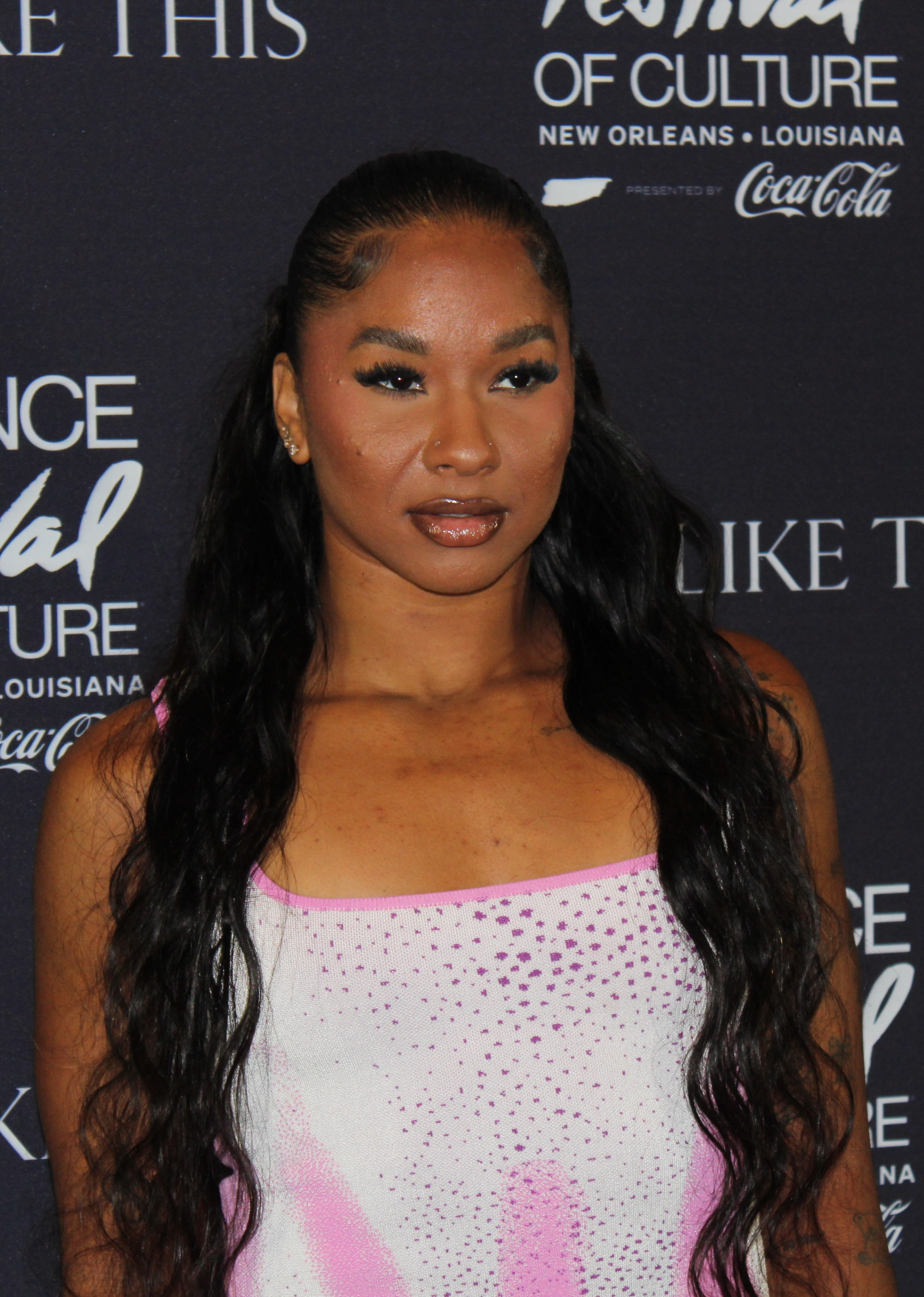
Jordan Chiles

- April 3 – Ashima Shiraishi, rock climber
- April 5 – Robbie Tucker, actor
- April 15 – Jordan Chiles, artistic gymnast
- April 20 – Ian Alexander, actor
- April 30 – Lil Tjay, rapper

=== May ===
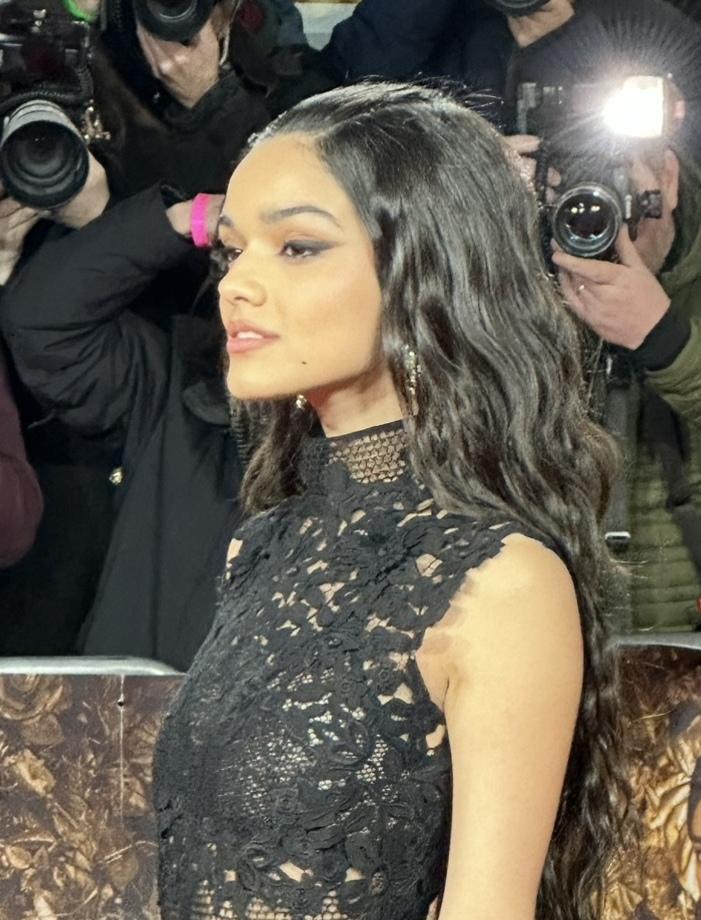
Rachel Zegler

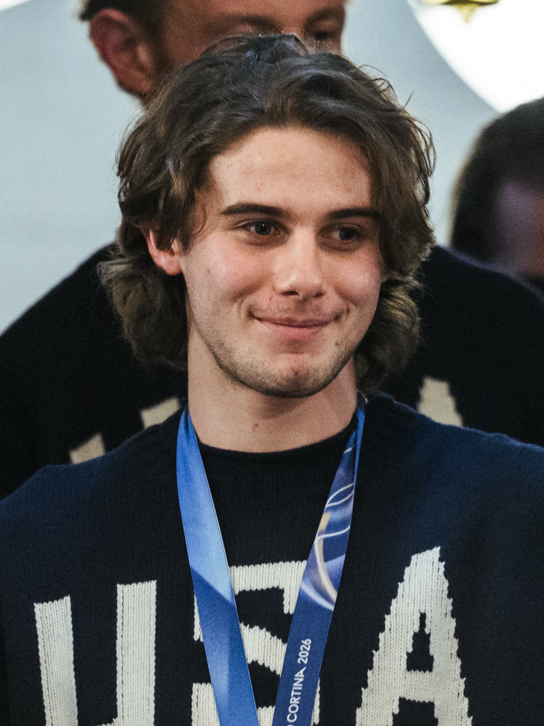
Jack Hughes

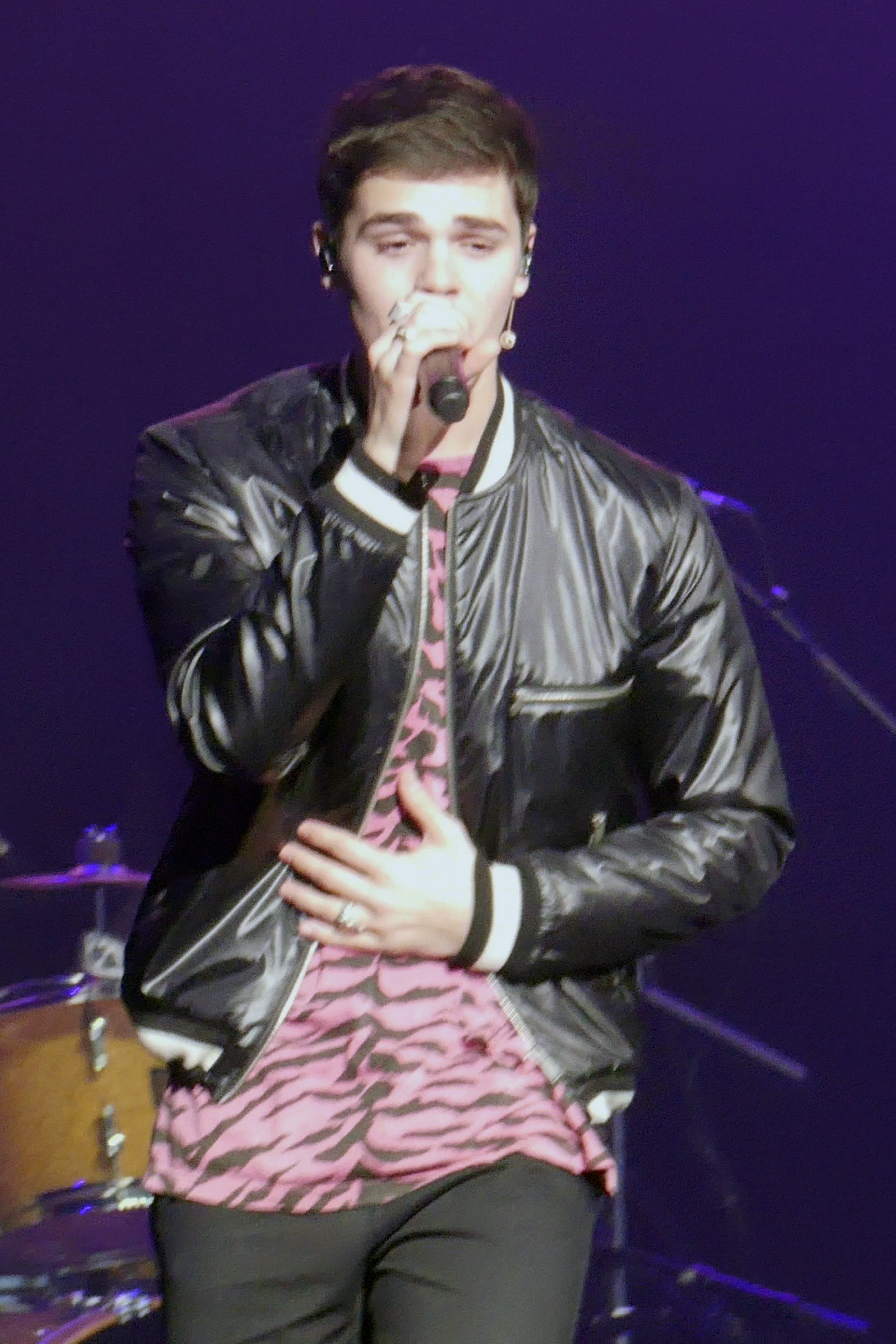
AJ Mitchell

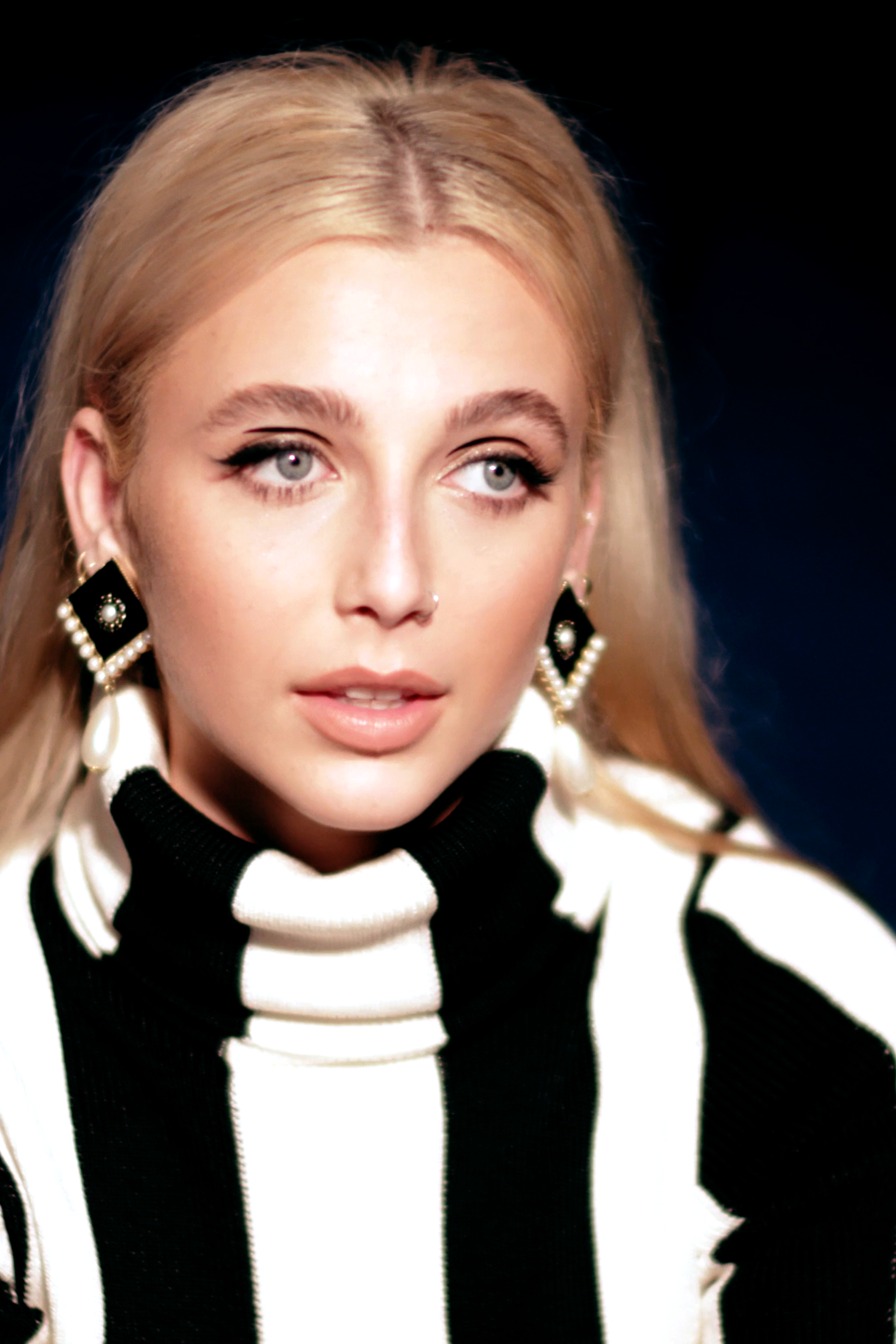
Emma Chamberlain

Emily Austin

- May 3 – Rachel Zegler, actress
- May 4 – Noah Beck, social media influencer
- May 14 – Jack Hughes, ice hockey player
- May 17 – AJ Mitchell, singer-songwriter and musician
- May 20 – Kyle Kashuv, conservative activist
- May 22
  - Emma Chamberlain, YouTuber
  - Judah Lewis, actor
- May 23 – Matthew Lintz, actor
- May 24 – Emily Austin, media personality
- May 27 – Izabela Vidovic, actress

=== June ===
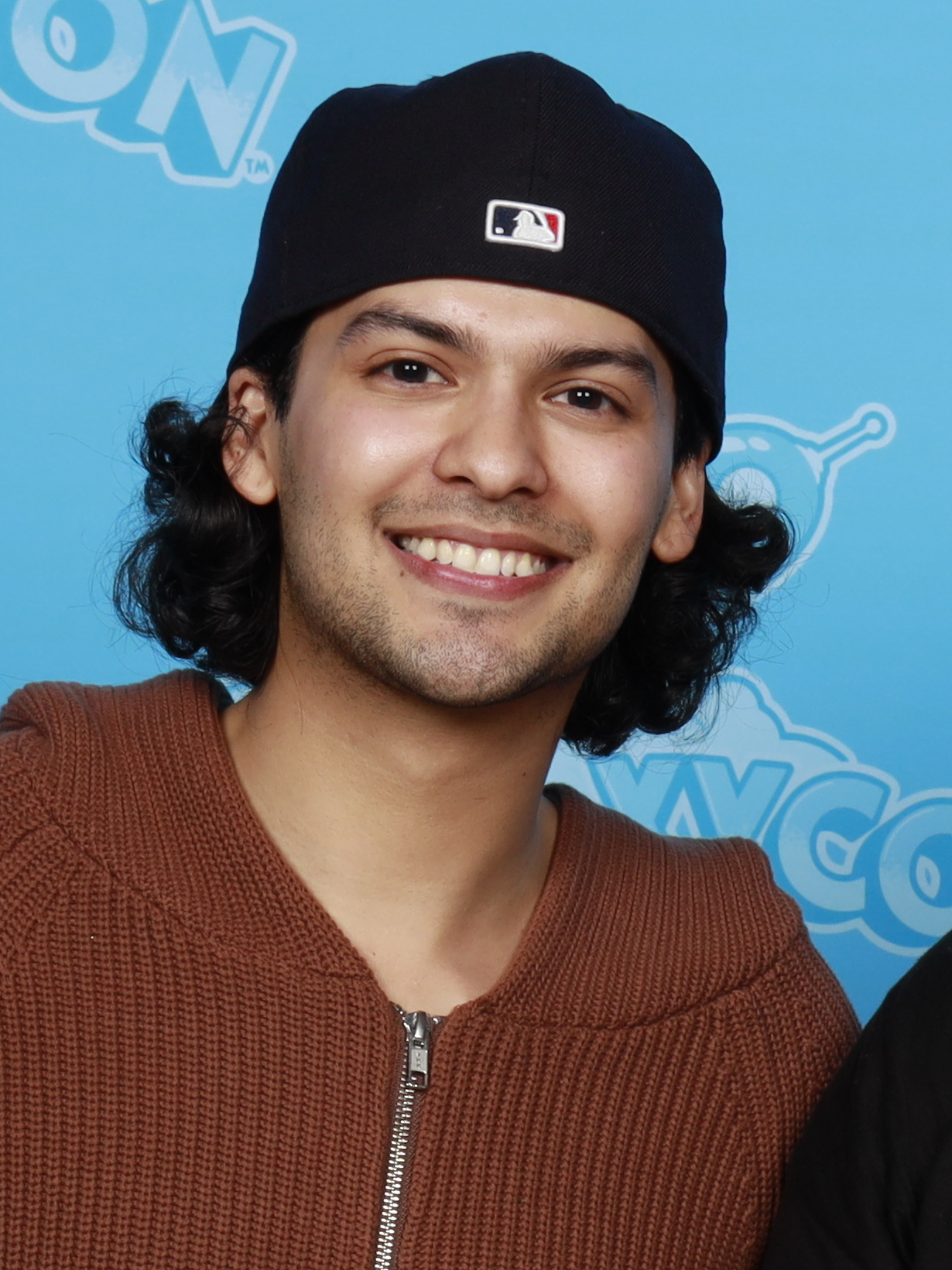
Xolo Mariduena

- June 1 – ppcocaine, rapper and online personality
- June 9 – Xolo Maridueña, actor
- June 10 – Sasha Obama, daughter of Barack Obama
- June 12 – John Bigelow IV, golfer
- June 19 – Ava Cantrell, actress and dancer
- June 21 – Sofie Dossi, contortionist and YouTuber
- June 24 – Mo'ne Davis, athlete

=== July ===
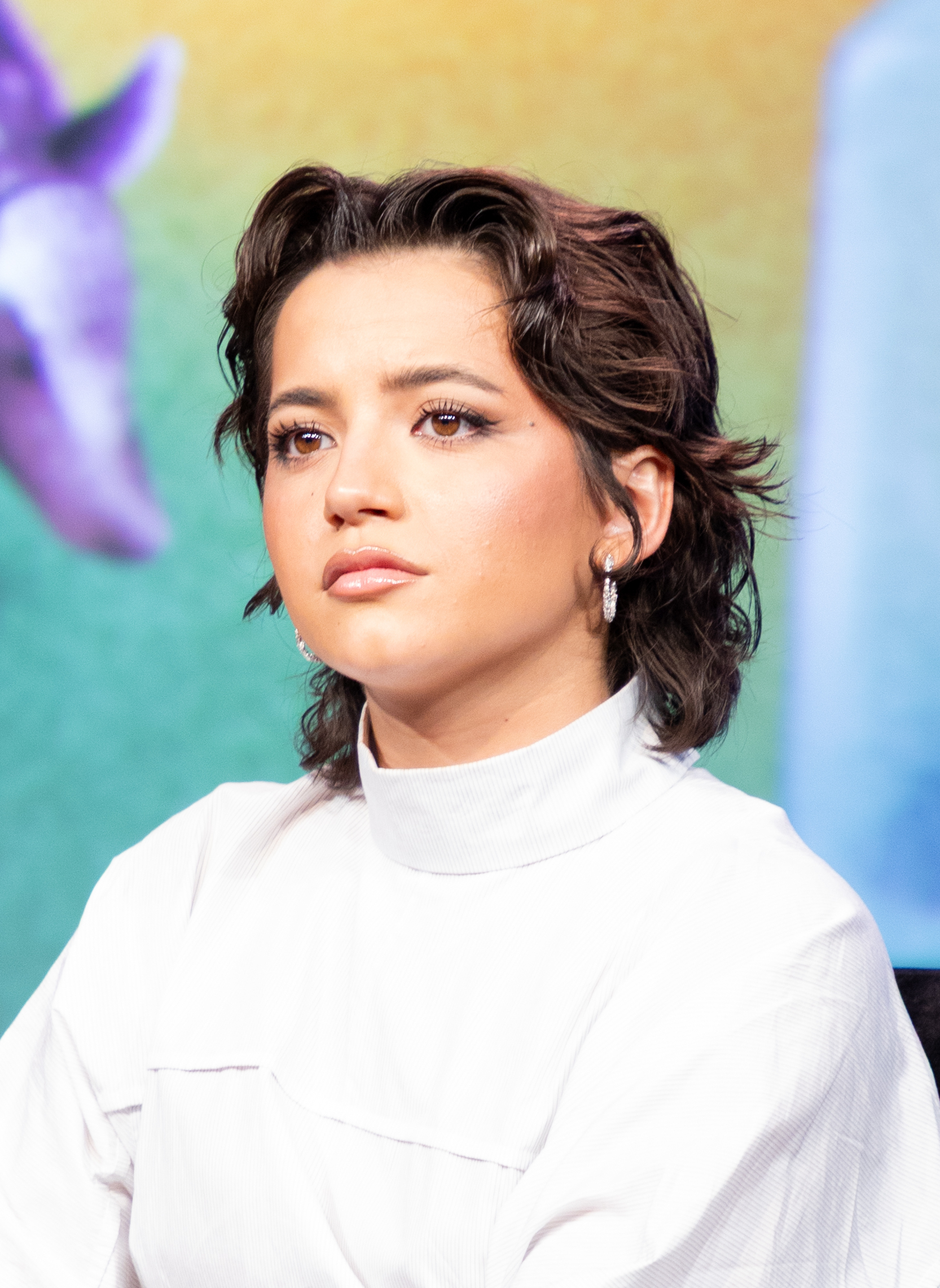
Isabela Merced

Hailie Deegan

- July 1 – Chosen Jacobs, actor, singer, and musician
- July 7 – Paul Juda, artistic gymnast
- July 8 – Marshawn Kneeland, American football player (d. 2025)
- July 10 – Isabela Merced, actress and singer
- July 12 – Niles Fitch, actor
- July 16 – Island Boys, musical duo
- July 18 – Hailie Deegan, stock car racing driver

=== August ===
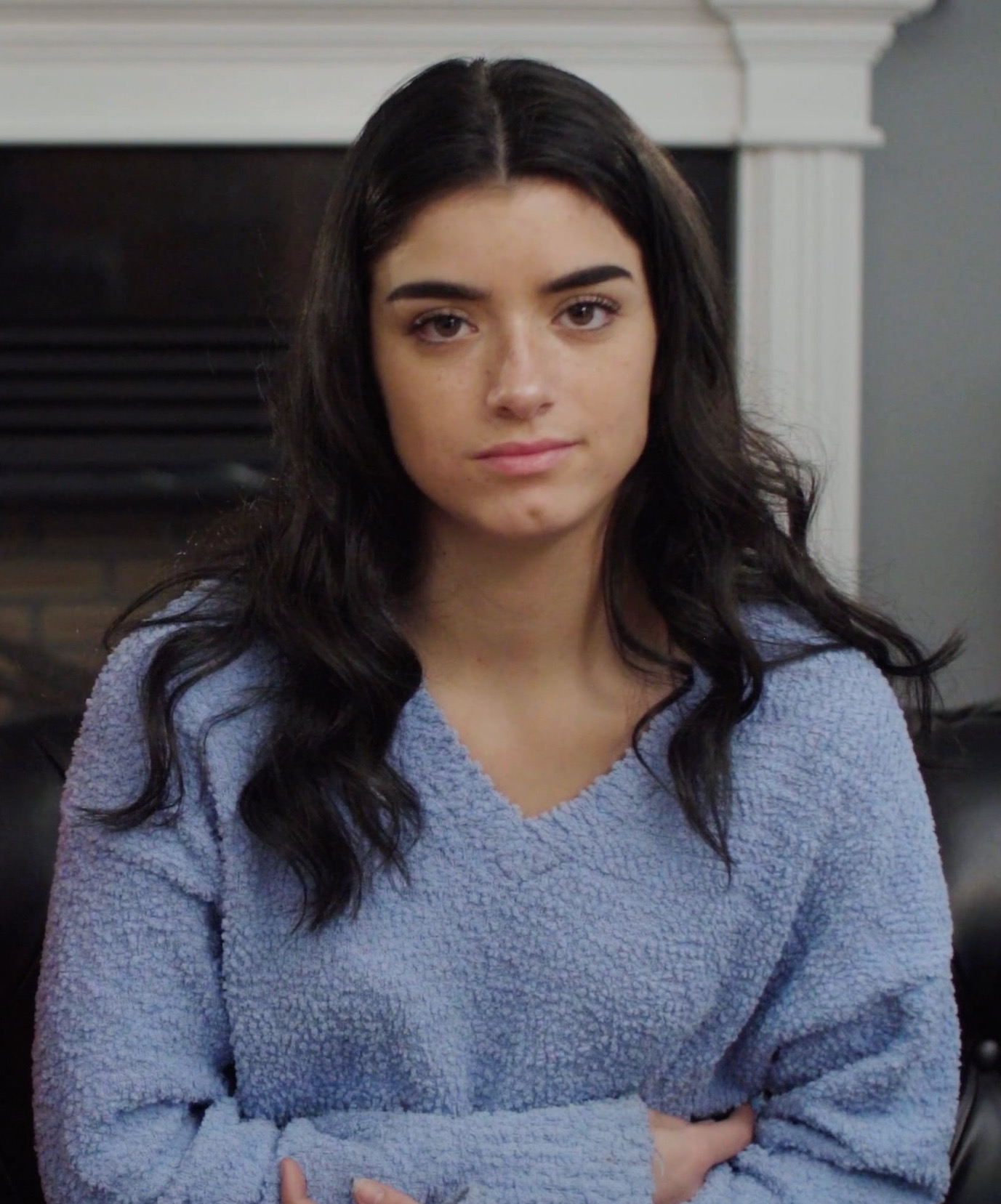
Dixie D'Amelio

- August 1 – Sarah Chadwick, activist
- August 5 – Josie Totah, actress
- August 6 – Ty Simpkins, actor
- August 8 – Bebe Wood, actress and singer
- August 12 – Dixie D'Amelio, social media influencer
- August 13 – Alyssa Jirrels, actress
- August 21 – Brooks Jensen, pro wrestler
- August 30 – Emily Bear, pianist and composer
- August 31 – Garrett Wareing, actor

=== September ===
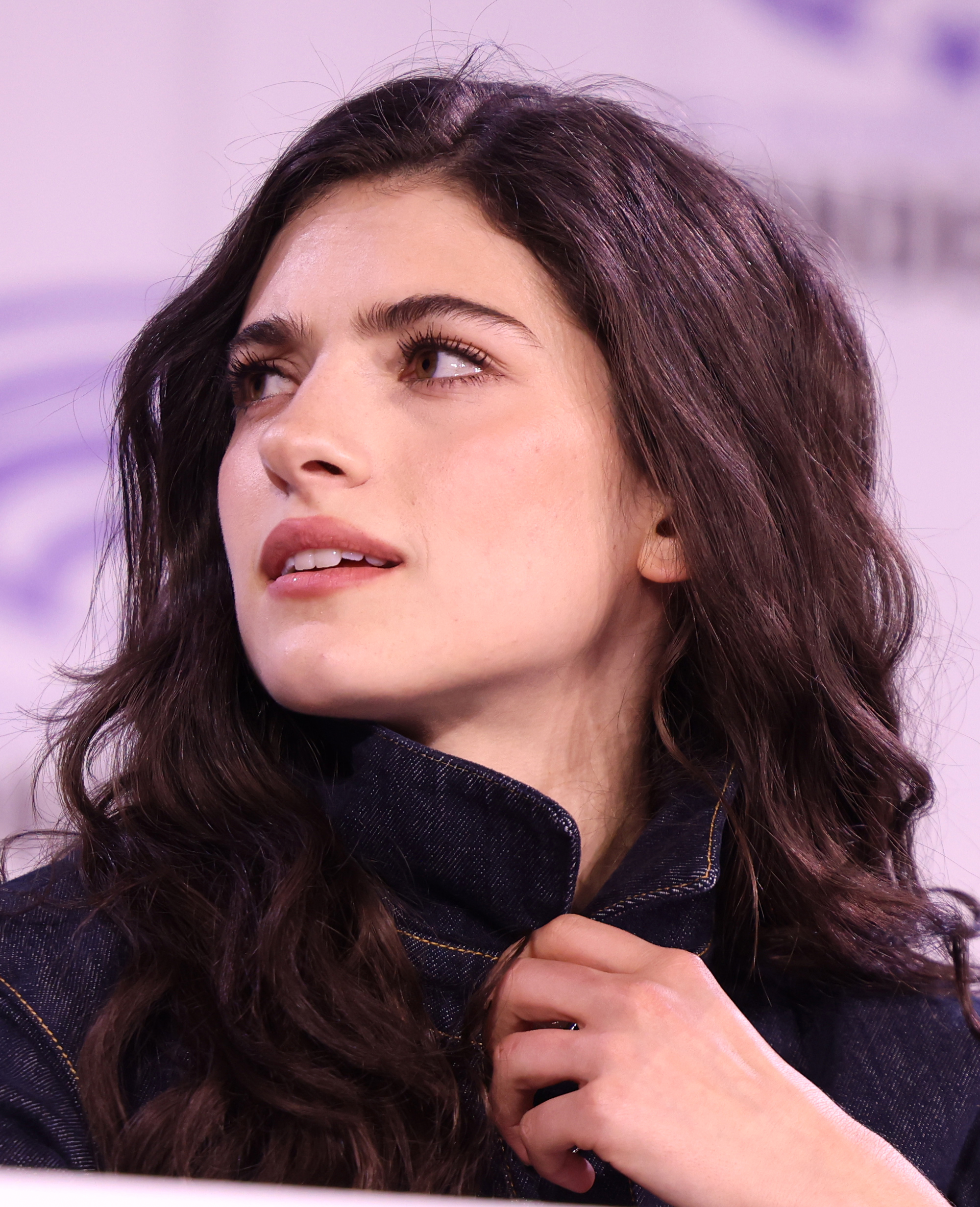
Ella Rubin

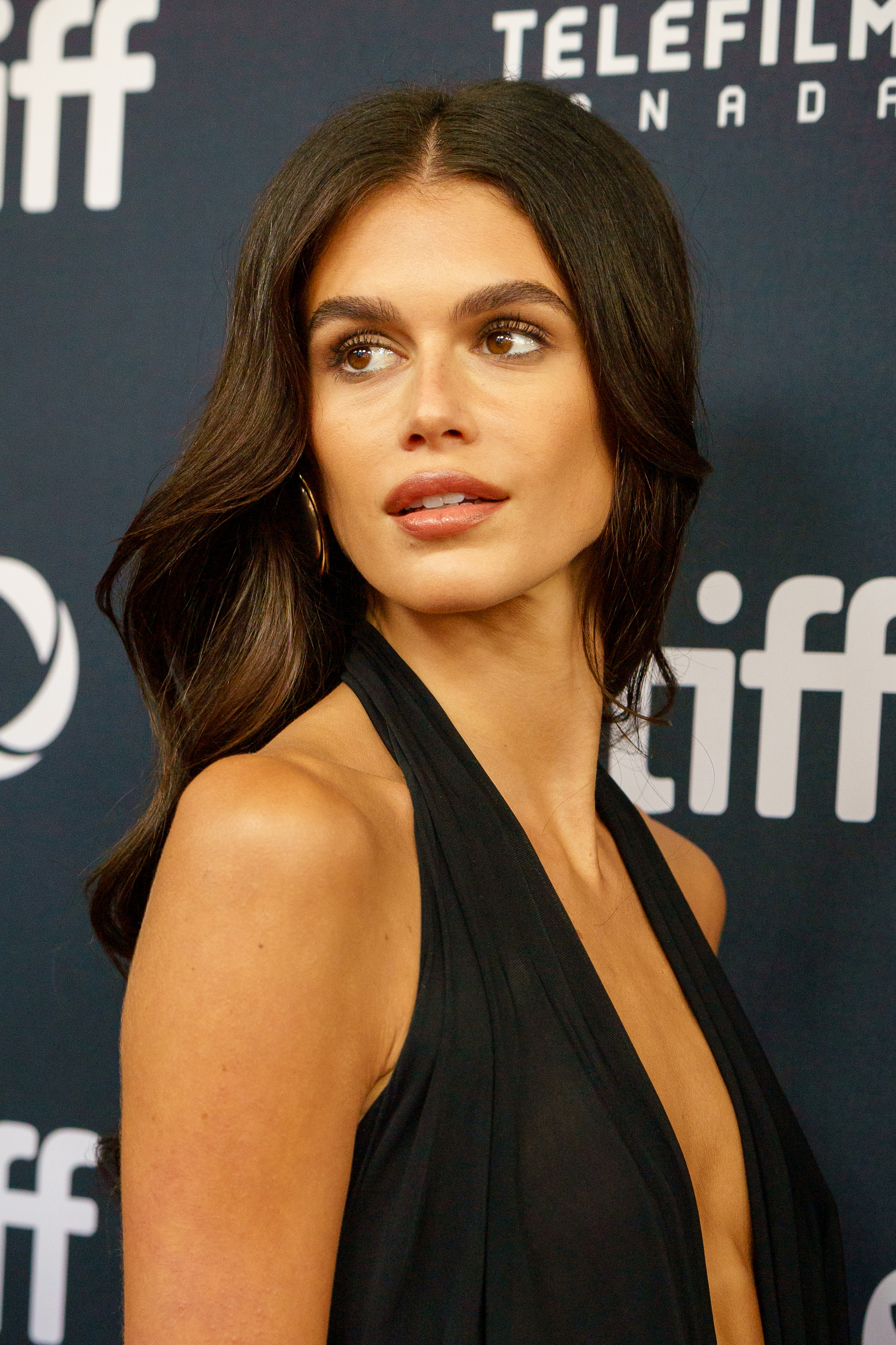
Kaia Gerber

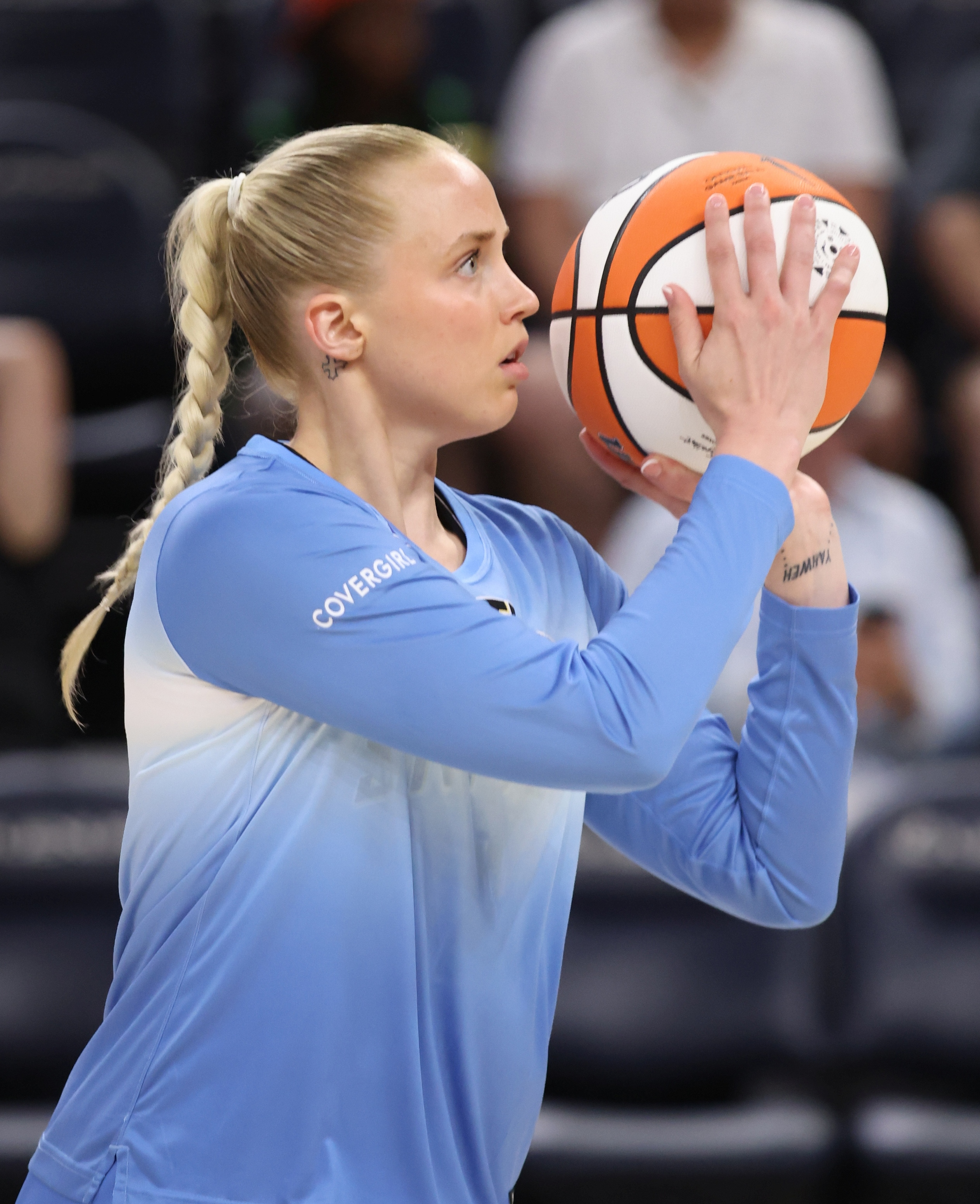
Hailey Van Lith

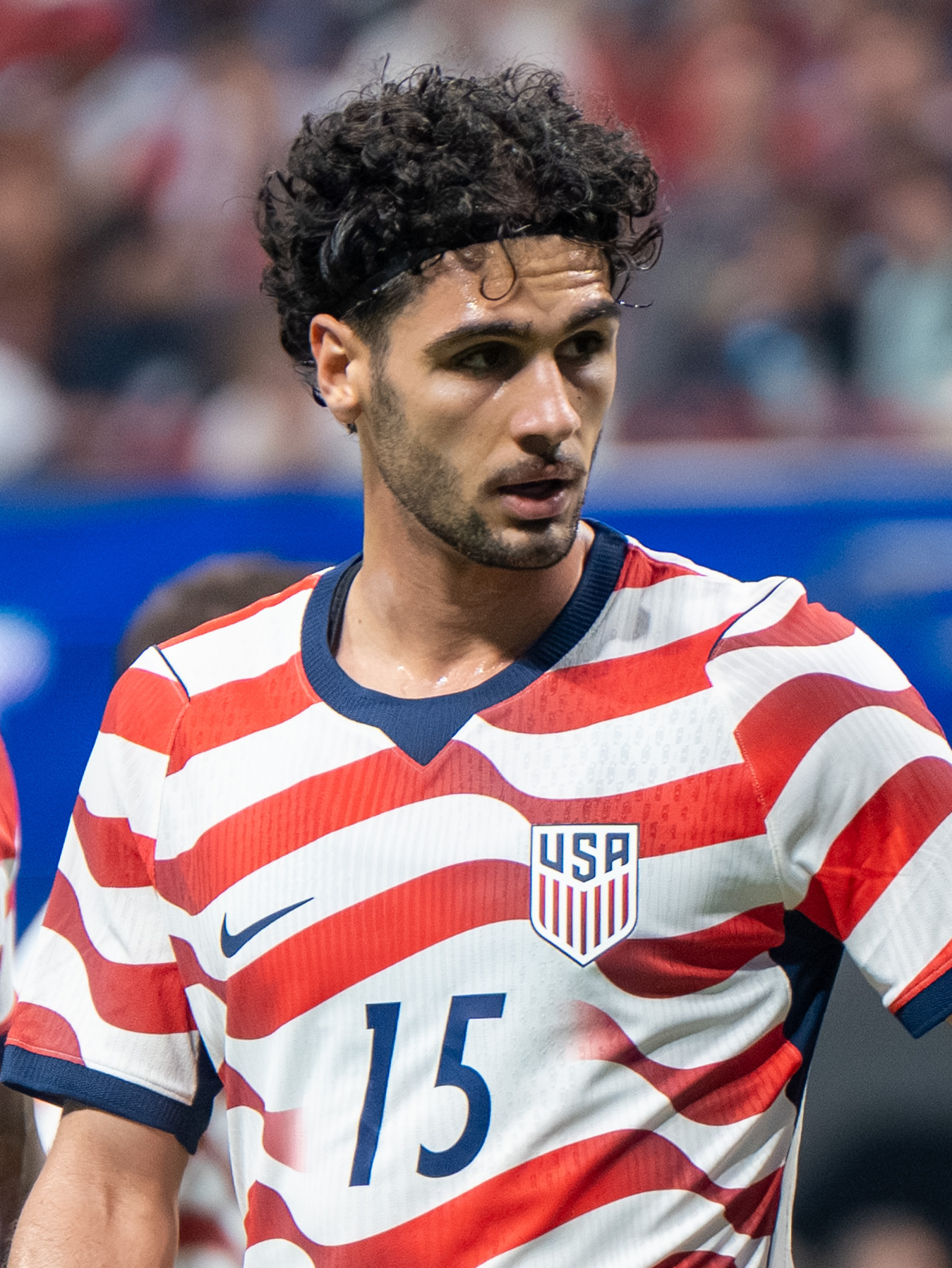
Johnny Cardoso

Cade Cunningham

- September 2 – Ella Rubin, actress
- September 4 – Talitha Bateman, actress
- September 6
  - Aidan Laprete, singer and actor
  - Terrence Clarke, basketball player (died 2021)
- September 9 – Hailey Van Lith, basketball player
- September 11 – Mackenzie Aladjem, actress
- September 15 – Emma Fuhrmann, actress
- September 20 – Johnny Cardoso, soccer player
- September 23 – J.I., musician
- September 25 – Cade Cunningham, basketball player

=== October ===
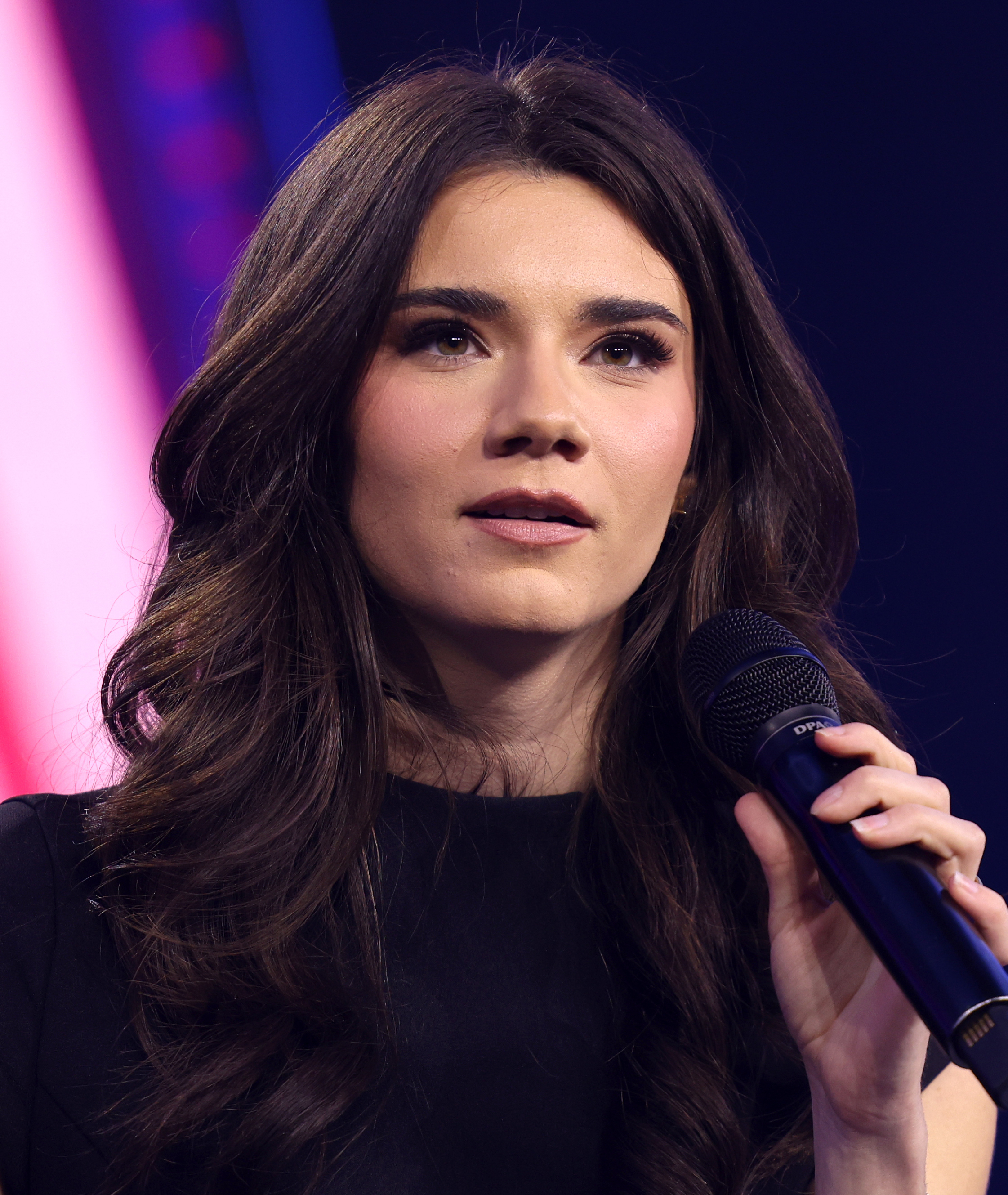
Brett Cooper

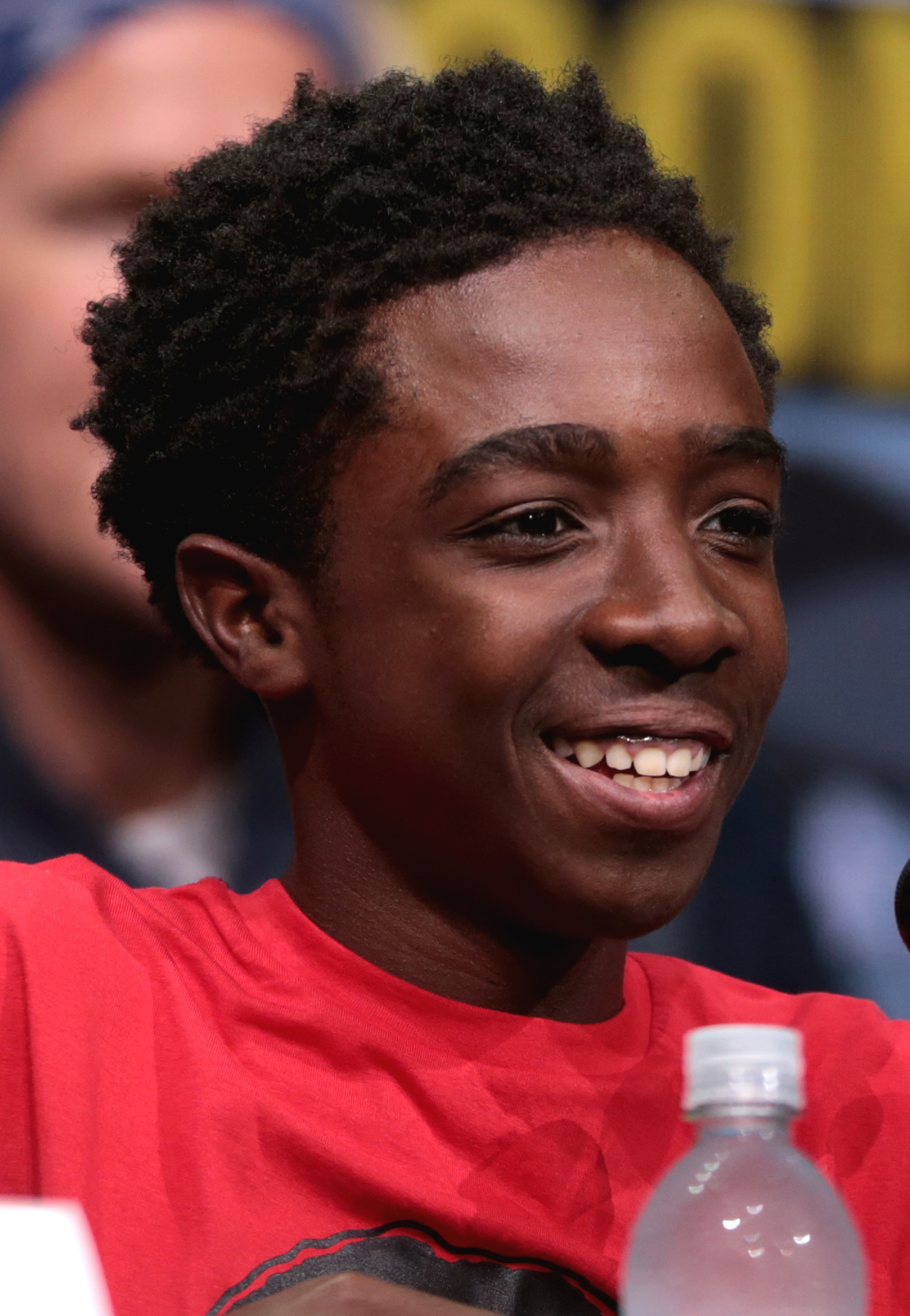
Caleb McLaughlin

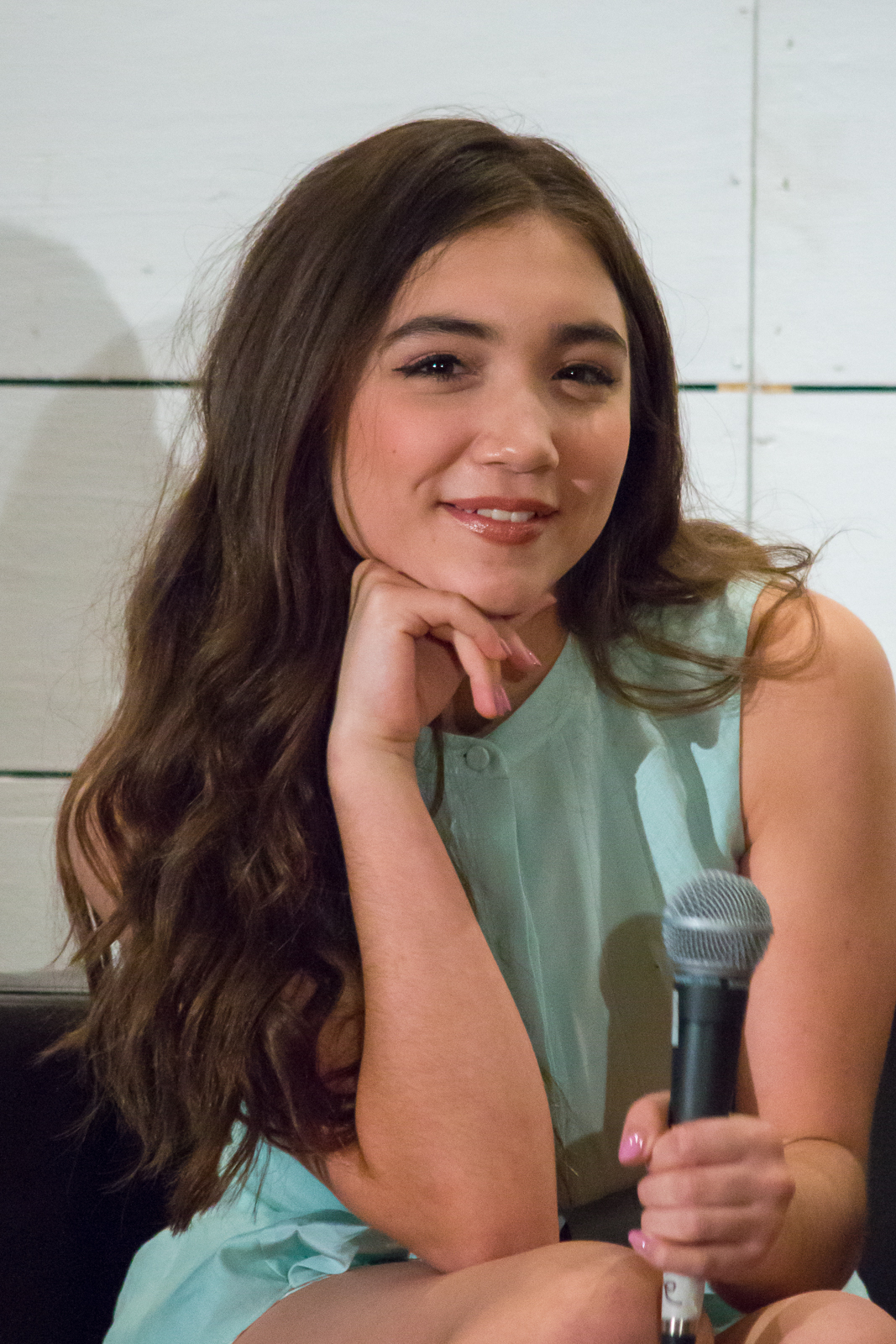
Rowan Blanchard

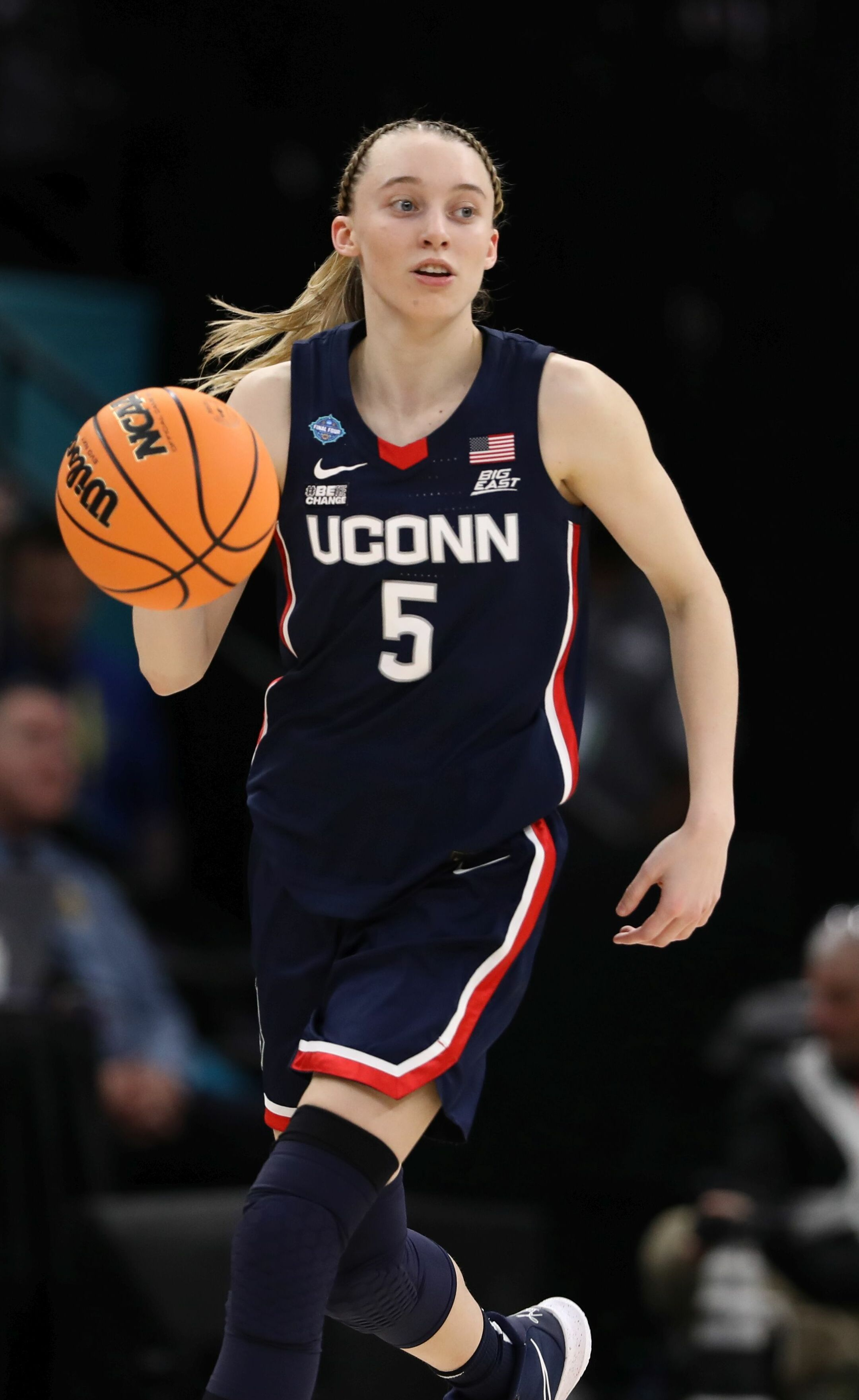
Paige Bueckers

- October 1
  - Luna Blaise, actress and singer
  - Tylee Craft, college football player (d. 2024)
- October 3
  - C. J. Stroud, American football player
  - SoFaygo, American rapper
- October 5 – Dalila Bela, Canadian-American actress
- October 10
  - Alfonso Calderon, activist
  - Blake Cooper, actor
- October 12
  - Brett Cooper, conservative commentator
  - Raymond Ochoa, actor
- October 13 – Caleb McLaughlin, actor
- October 14 – Rowan Blanchard, actress
- October 19 – SpotemGottem, rapper
- October 20 – Paige Bueckers, basketball player
- October 27
  - Autumn de Forest, artist
  - Gianni DeCenzo, actor

=== November ===
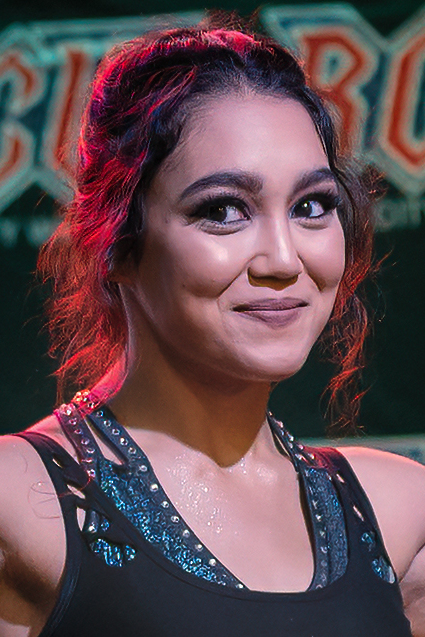
Roxanne Perez

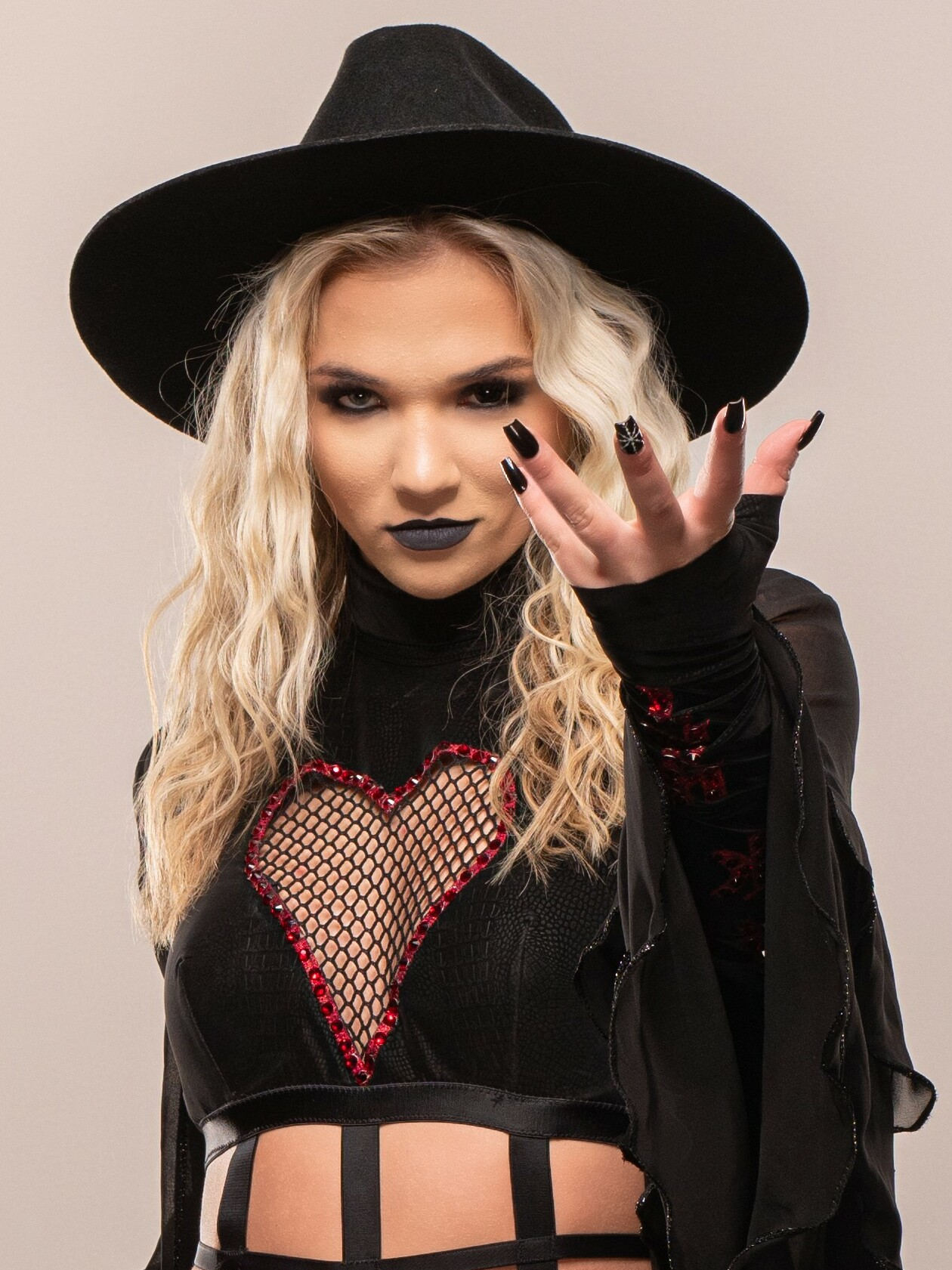
Julia Hart

- November 5 – Roxanne Perez, pro wrestler
- November 8 – Julia Hart, pro wrestler
- November 21 – Samantha Bailey, actress

=== December ===
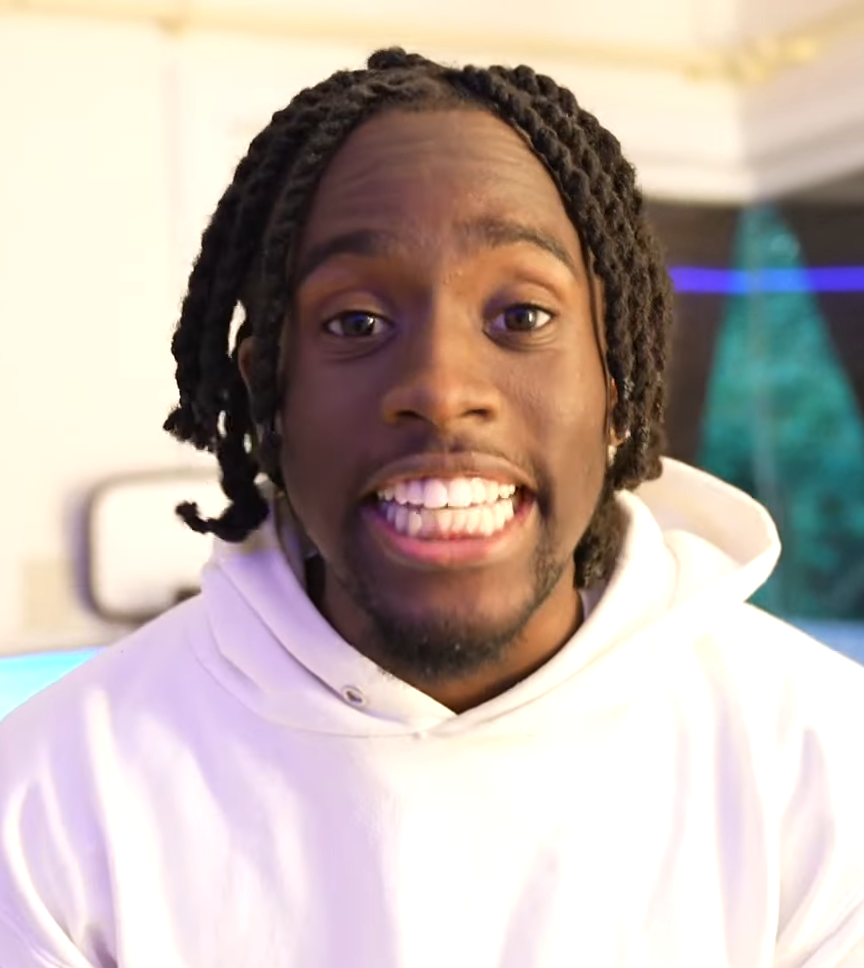
Kai Cenat

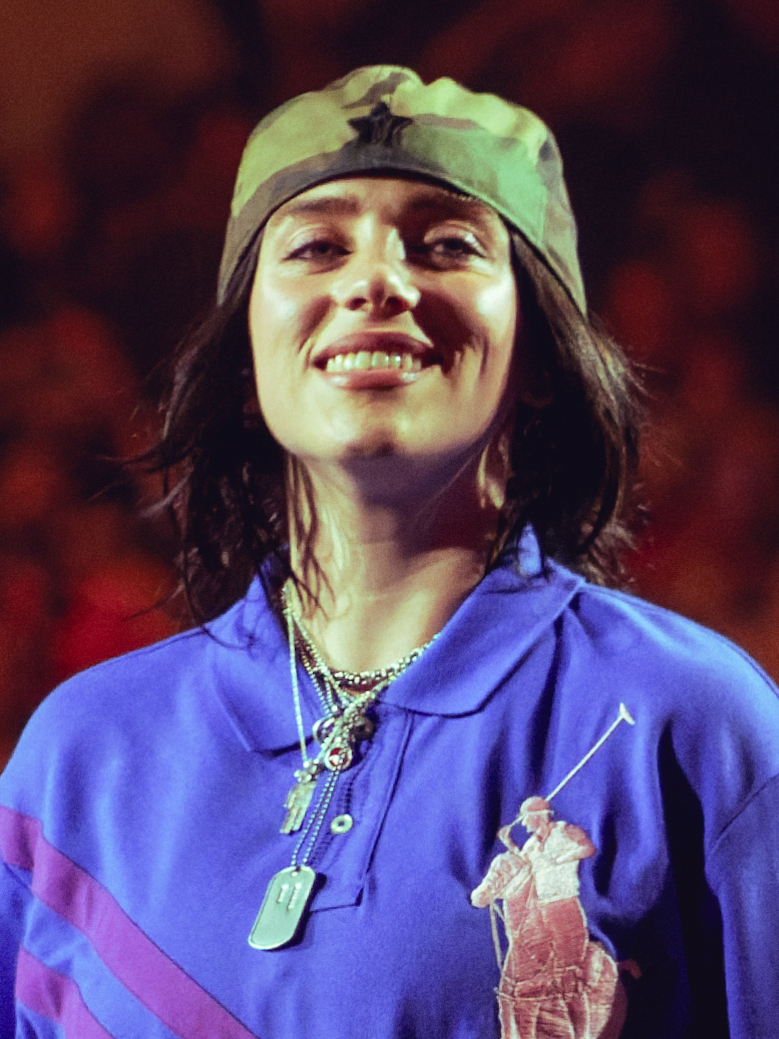
Billie Eilish

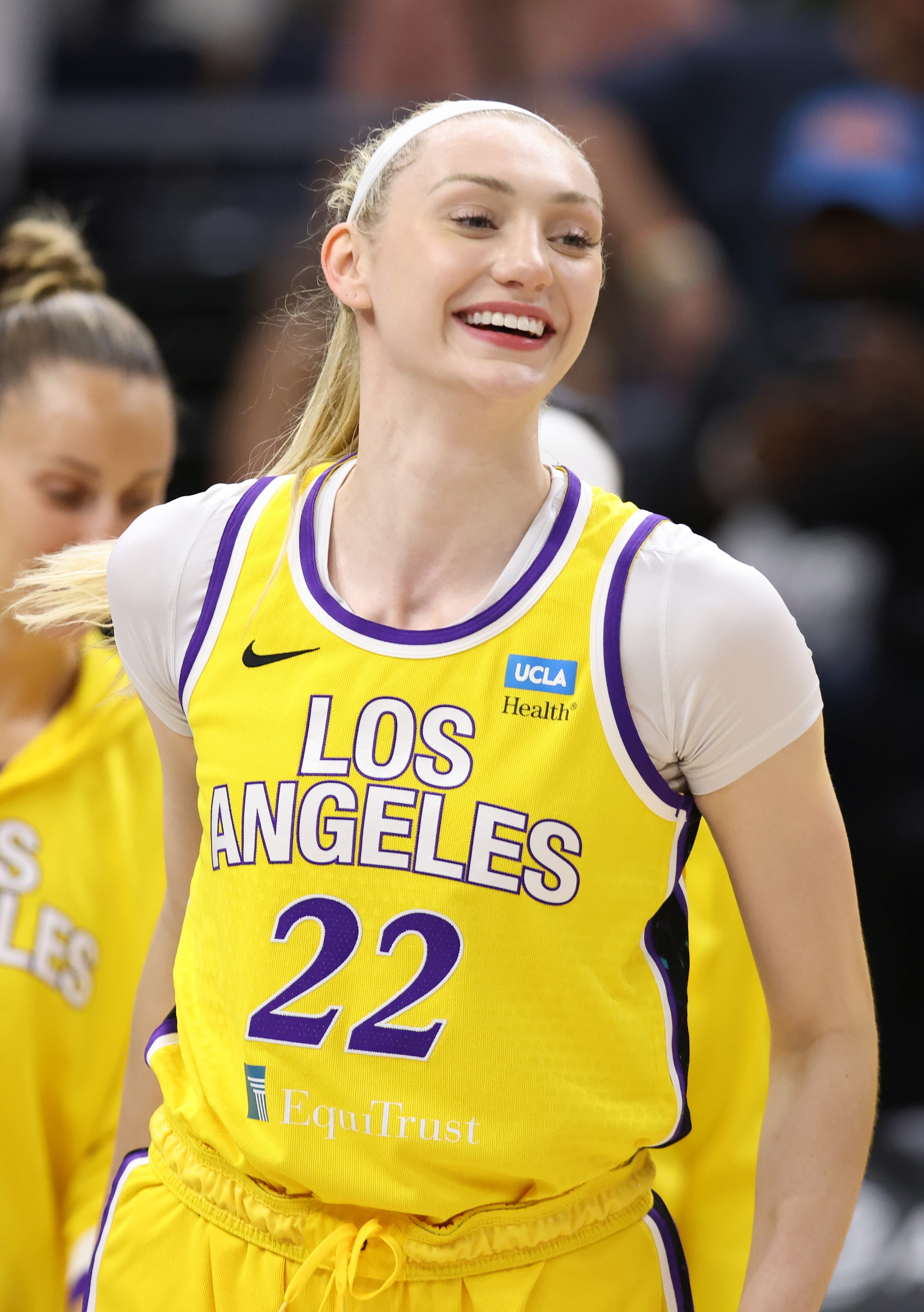
Cameron Brink

- December 3 – Eliza Jane Scovill, murder victim (d. 2005)
- December 8 – Tylen Jacob Williams, actor
- December 14 – Joshua Rush, actor
- December 16 – Kai Cenat, YouTuber
- December 18 – Billie Eilish, singer
- December 24 – Emma Weyant, swimmer
- December 28 – Madison De La Garza, actress
- December 31 – Cameron Brink, basketball player

=== Full date unknown ===
- Jack Teixeira, airman alleged to be behind the 2023 Pentagon document leaks
- Zoe Yin, artist and writer

== Deaths ==
=== January ===
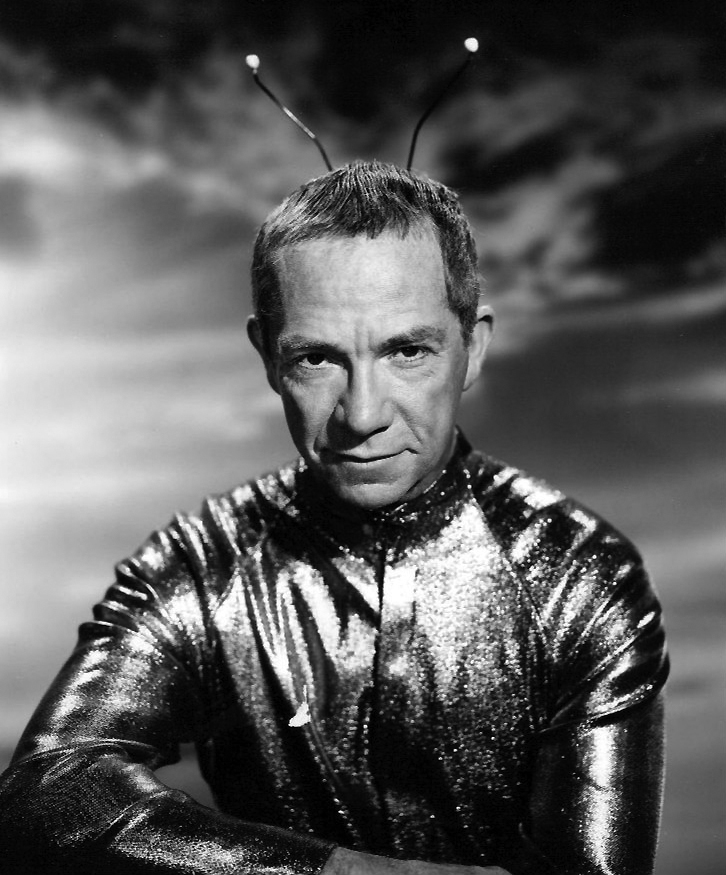
Ray Walston

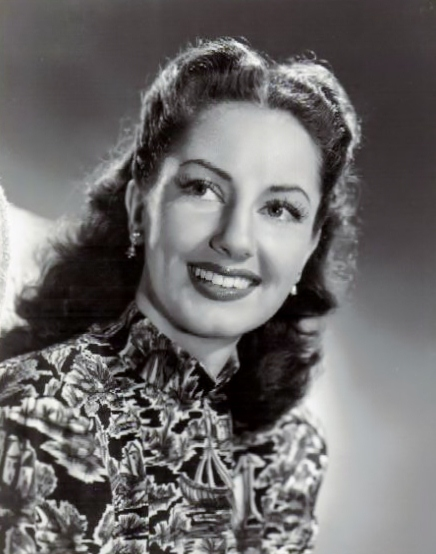
Virginia O'Brien

- January 1 – Ray Walston, actor (b. 1914)
- January 2 – William P. Rogers, politician (b. 1913)
- January 4 – Les Brown, jazz musician (b. 1912)
- January 5 – Nancy Parsons, actress (b. 1942)
- January 6 – Gene Taylor, media personality (b. 1947)
- January 8 – Edwin Etherington, writer, lawyer, and civil rights advocate (b. 1924)
- January 10 – John G. Schmitz, politician (b. 1930)
- January 11
  - Dorothy M. Horstmann, virologist who made important discoveries about polio (b. 1911)
  - Louis Krages, German-American racing driver and businessman (b. 1949)
- January 12
  - Affirmed, race horse (b. 1975)
  - Bill Hewlett, co-founder of Hewlett-Packard (b. 1913)
- January 15 – Bob Braun, actor (b. 1929)
- January 16
  - Virginia O'Brien, actress (b. 1919)
  - Leonard Woodcock, trade unionist and diplomat (b. 1911)
- January 17 – Gregory Corso, poet (b. 1930)
- January 19 – Maxine Mesinger, newspaper columnist (b. 1925)
- January 21
  - Sandy Baron, actor (b. 1936)
  - Byron De La Beckwith, white supremacist and murderer (b. 1920)
- January 22
  - Tommie Agee, baseball player (b. 1942)
  - Roy Brown, clown (b. 1932)
- January 23 – Jack McDuff, jazz organist and bandleader (b. 1926)
- January 26
  - Murray Edelman, political scientist (b. 1919)
  - Diane Whipple, lacrosse player and coach and dog mauling victim (b. 1968)
- January 28
  - Curt Blefary, baseball player (b. 1943)
  - Sally Mansfield, actress (b. 1920)
- January 29 – Frances Bible, American operatic mezzo-soprano (b. 1919)
- January 30 – Joseph Ransohoff, neurosurgeon (b. 1915)
- January 31 – Gordon R. Dickson, science fiction writer (b. 1923)

=== February ===
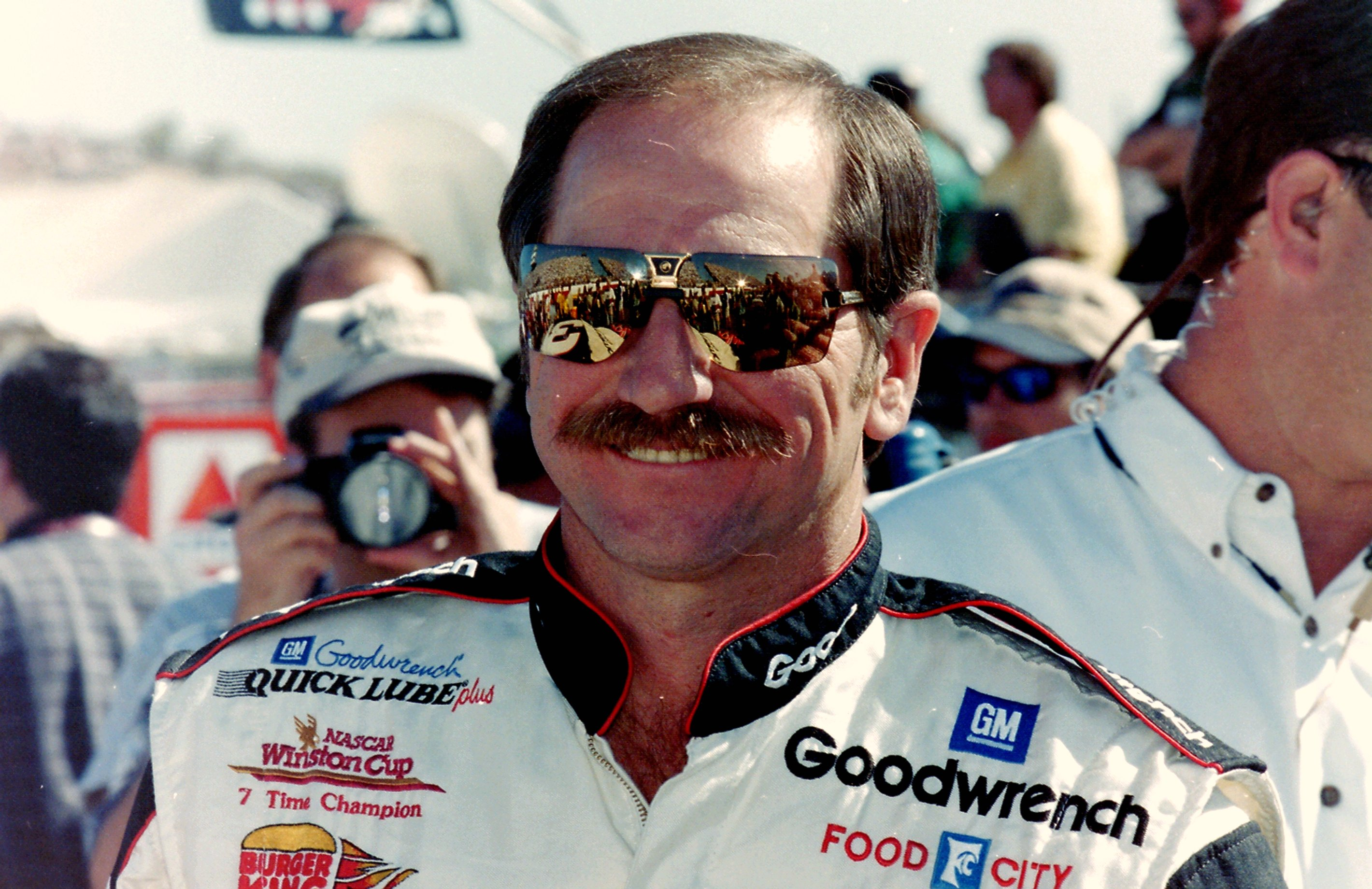
Dale Earnhardt

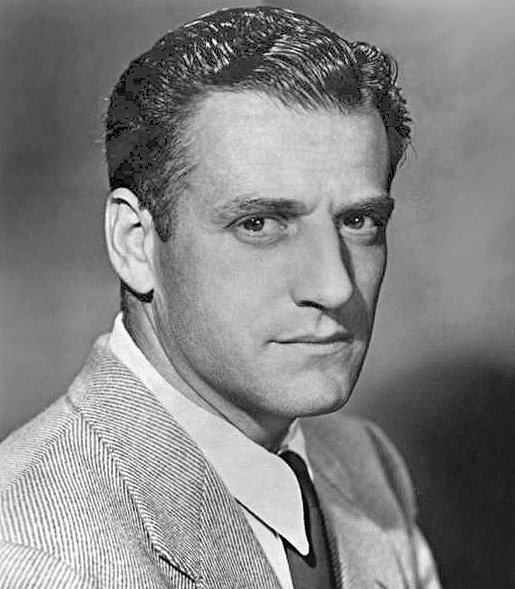
Stanley Kramer

- February 4 – J. J. Johnson, jazz musician (b. 1924)
- February 6 – Arthur W. Hummel Jr., diplomat (b. 1920)
- February 7 – Dale Evans, actress, wife of Roy Rogers (b. 1912)
- February 8 – Arlene Eisenberg, author (b. 1934)
- February 9 – Herbert A. Simon, Nobel award-winning economist (b. 1916)
- February 10
  - Lewis Arquette, actor (b. 1935)
  - Abraham Beame, Mayor of New York City. (b. 1906)
- February 13 – Victor Veysey, American politician (b. 1915)
- February 15
  - Burt Kennedy, screenwriter and director (b. 1922)
  - Jack McGowan, American professional golfer (b. 1930)
- February 16
  - Howard W. Koch, producer and director (b. 1916)
  - William Masters, gynecologist (b. 1915)
- February 17
  - Debbie Dean, American singer (b. 1928)
  - Khalid Muhammad, black supremacist (b. 1948)
- February 18
  - Dale Earnhardt, race car driver (b. 1951)
  - Eddie Mathews, baseball player (b. 1931)
- February 19 – Stanley Kramer, director (b. 1913)
- February 20 – Rosemary DeCamp, actress (b. 1910)
- February 22 – John Fahey, finger-style guitarist (b. 1939)
- February 23 – Anthony Giacalone, organized crime figure (b. 1919)
- February 24 – Phil Collier, sports writer (b. 1925)

=== March ===
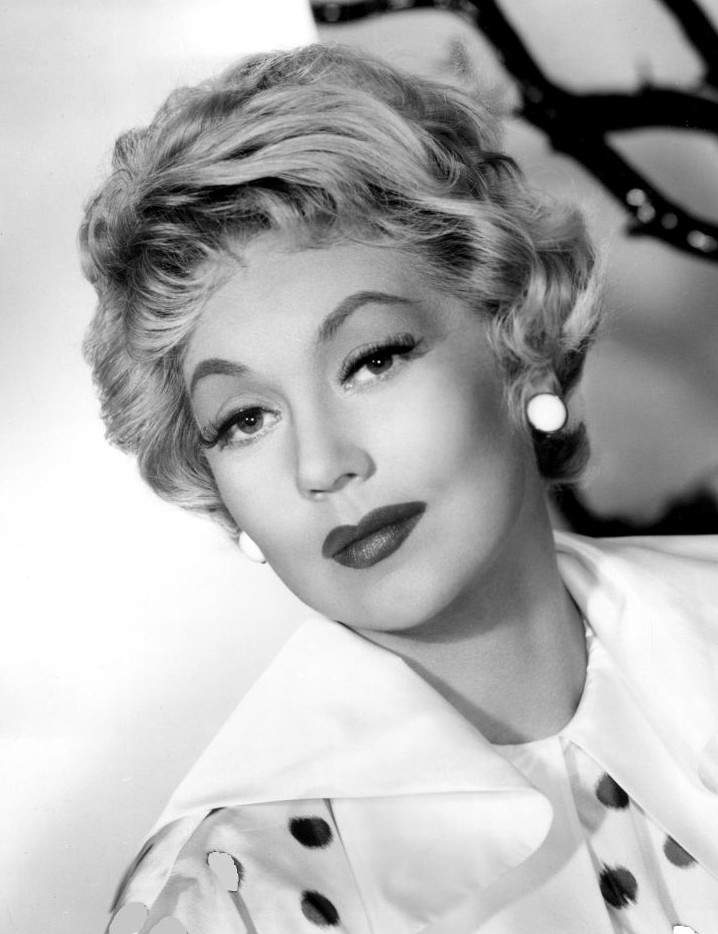
Ann Sothern

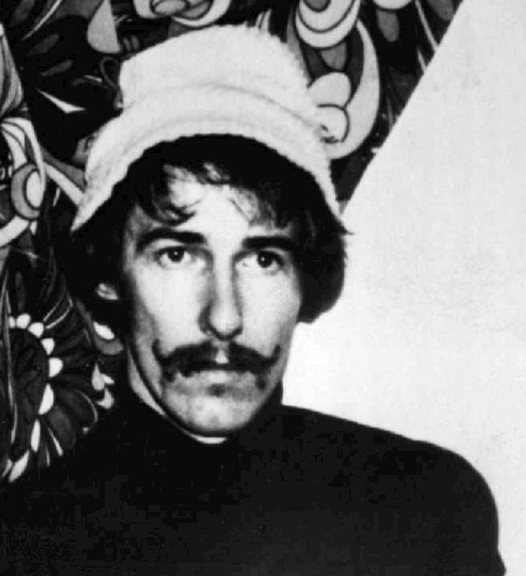
John Phillips

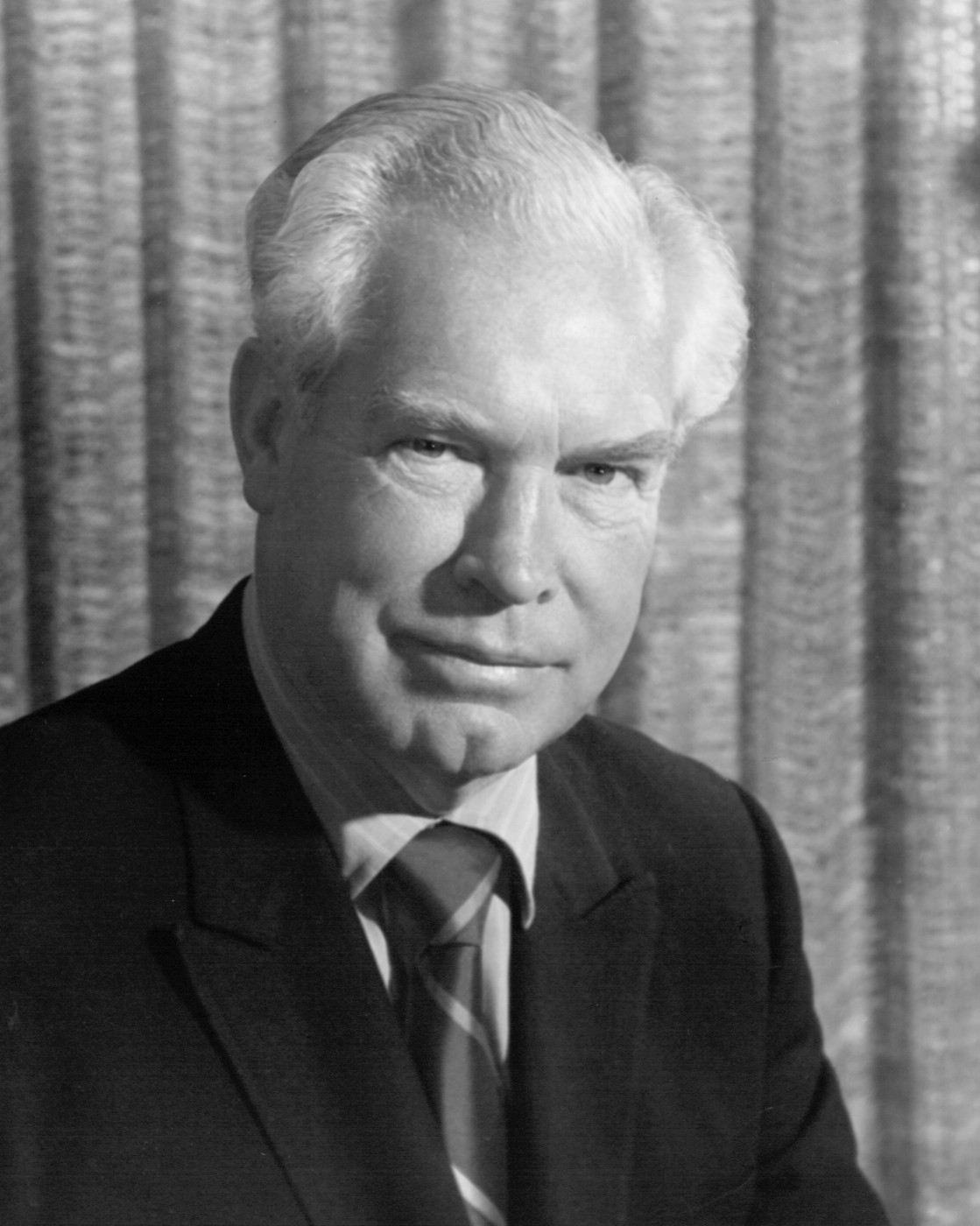
William Hanna

- March 1
  - John Painter, supercentenarian (b. 1888)
  - Henry Wade, soldier and lawyer (b. 1914)
- March 2 – Lonnie Glosson, musician (b. 1908)
- March 4
  - Glenn Hughes, musician (b. 1950)
  - Fred Lasswell, cartoonist (b. 1916)
  - Jim Rhodes, politician (b. 1909)
  - Harold Stassen, politician (b. 1907)
- March 8 – Edward Winter, actor (b. 1937)
- March 10 – Michael Elkins, broadcaster and journalist (b. 1917)
- March 12
  - John Anderson, canoeist (b. 1915)
  - Morton Downey Jr., television talk show host and actor (b. 1932)
  - Henry Lee Lucas, serial killer (b. 1936)
  - Robert Ludlum, writer (b. 1927)
- March 13 – Walter Dukes, basketball player (b. 1930)
- March 15
  - Durward Gorham Hall, politician, (b. 1910)
  - Ann Sothern, actress (b. 1909)
- March 17 – Grace Cole, politician (b. 1922)
- March 18 – John Phillips, American singer, guitarist, songwriter and promoter (b. 1935)
- March 21 – Billy Ray Smith Sr., football player (b. 1934)
- March 22 – William Hanna, animator (b. 1910)
- March 26 – Brenda Helser, Olympic swimmer (b. 1924)
- March 28
  - Jim Benton, footballer (b. 1916)
  - George Connor, American racecar driver (b. 1906)
- March 31 – Clifford Shull, Nobel physicist (b. 1915)

=== April ===
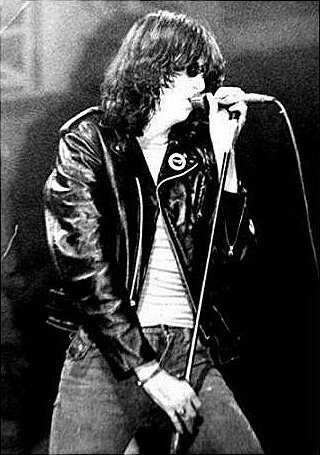
Joey Ramone

- April 1 – Jo-Jo Moore, baseball player (b. 1908)
- April 2 – Jennifer Syme, murder victim (b. 1972)
- April 4 – Ed Roth, artist, cartoonist, illustrator, pinstriper and custom car designer and builder (b. 1932)
- April 6 – Charles Pettigrew, singer (b. 1963)
- April 7
  - David Graf, American actor (b. 1950)
  - Beatrice Straight, American actress (b. 1914)
- April 8
  - Safiya Henderson-Holmes, poet (b. 1950)
  - Van Stephenson, singer-songwriter (b. 1953)
- April 9 – Willie Stargell, American baseball player, member of the Baseball Hall of Fame (b. 1940)
- April 10 – Richard Evans Schultes, American ethnobotanist (b. 1915)
- April 11 – Sandy Bull, folk musician and composer (b. 1941)
- April 15 – Joey Ramone, musician (b. 1951)
- April 16 – Michael Ritchie, filmmaker (b. 1938)
- April 19 – Egor Popov, Russian-born American civil engineer. (b. 1912)
- April 21 – Jack Haley Jr., director, producer and writer (b. 1933)
- April 24 – Leon Sullivan, minister and activist (b. 1922)
- April 27 – Charlie Applewhite, singer and radio host (b. 1932)
- April 28
  - Erica Green, murder victim (b. 1997)
  - James Still, poet, novelist and folklorist (b. 1906)

=== May ===
- May 4 – Eleanor Lausch Dietrich, operatic soprano (b. 1912)
- May 5
  - Charles Black, constitutional scholar (b. 1915)
  - Morris Graves, expressionist painter (b. 1910)
  - Cliff Hillegass, creator of CliffsNotes (b. 1917)
- May 6 – Weldon B. Gibson, economist (b. 1916)
- May 11 – Douglas Adams, English author and humorist (b. 1952)
- May 12 – Perry Como, singer (b. 1912)
- May 13 – Jason Miller, playwright and actor (b. 1939)
- May 22
  - Katharine Bartlett, American anthropologist and museum curator (b. 1907)
  - Whitman Mayo, American actor (b. 1930)
- May 23 – Harry Townes, American actor (b. 1914)
- May 26 – Anne Haney, American actress (b. 1934)
- May 27 – Victor Kiam, businessman and American football owner (b. 1926)
- May 31 – Arlene Francis, American actress and game show panelist (b. 1907)

=== June ===
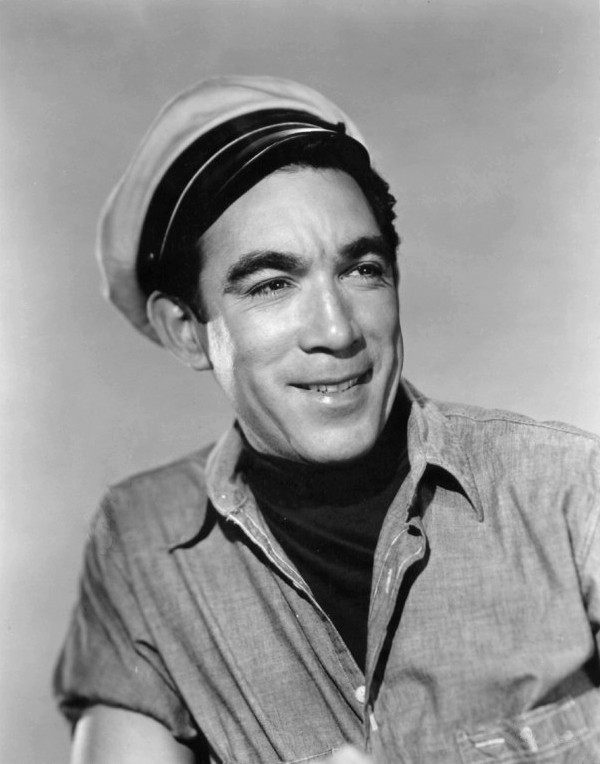
Anthony Quinn

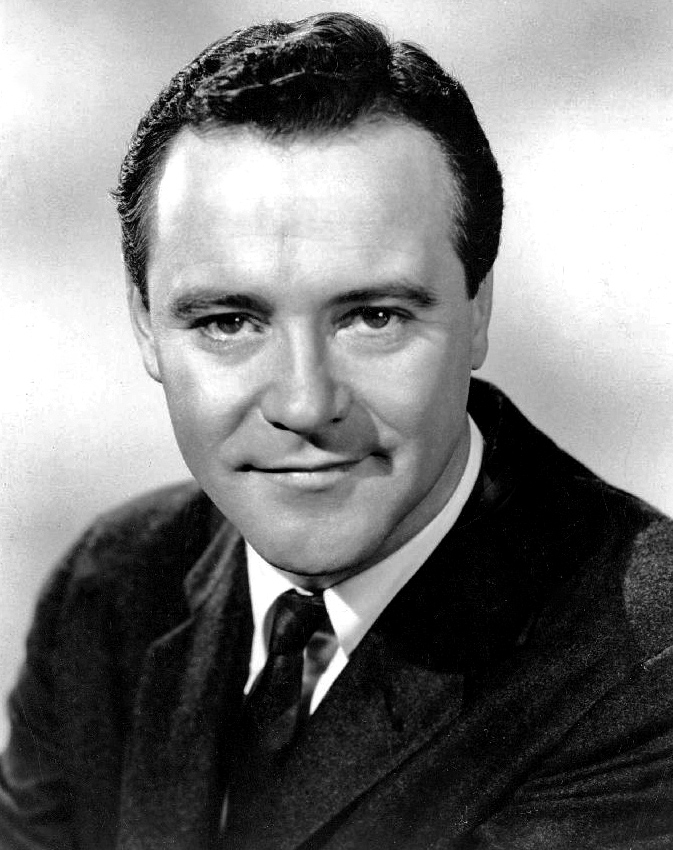
Jack Lemmon

- June 1 – Hank Ketcham, cartoonist, creator of Dennis the Menace (b. 1920)
- June 2 – Imogene Coca, actress (b. 1908)
- June 3 – Anthony Quinn, actor (b. 1915)
- June 4 – John Hartford, musician and composer (b. 1937)
- June 10 – Mike Mentzer, bodybuilder (b. 1951)
- June 11 – Timothy McVeigh, domestic terrorist (b. 1968)
- June 17 – Donald J. Cram, Nobel chemist (b. 1919)
- June 21
  - John Lee Hooker, musician (b. 1917)
  - Carroll O'Connor, actor (b. 1924)
- June 22 – George Evans, cartoonist and illustrator (b. 1920)
- June 24 – William H. Sewell, sociologist (b. 1909)
- June 26 – John F. Yardley, aeronautical engineer (b. 1925)
- June 27 – Jack Lemmon, actor (b. 1925)
- June 28 – Mortimer J. Adler, philosopher (b. 1902)
- June 30
  - Chet Atkins, guitarist and record producer (b. 1924)
  - Joe Henderson, jazz tenor saxophonist (b. 1937)

=== July ===
- July 3
  - Roy Nichols, guitarist (b. 1932)
  - Johnny Russell, country singer (b. 1940)
- July 4 – Keenan Milton, skateboarder (b. 1974)
- July 16 – Terry Gordy, American professional wrestler (b. 1961)
- July 17 – Katharine Graham, American publisher (b. 1917)
- July 19 – Gunther Gebel-Williams, animal trainer (b. 1934)
- July 22 – Bob Ferguson, American country music songwriter and record producer (b. 1927)
- July 28 – John Easton, American professional baseball player (b. 1933)
- July 31 – Poul Anderson, writer (b. 1926)

=== August ===
- August 3 – Christopher Hewett, English actor (b. 1921)
- August 4 – Lorenzo Music, writer, producer, and voice actor (b. 1937)
- August 8
  - Big Ed, rapper (b. 1971)
  - Maureen Reagan, political activist and daughter of Ronald Reagan (b. 1941)
- August 10 – Lou Boudreau, baseball player (b. 1917)
- August 14 – Earl Anthony, professional bowler (b. 1938)
- August 19 – Betty Everett, R&B and soul singer (b. 1939)
- August 23 – Kathleen Freeman, actress (b. 1919)
- August 24 – George Benson (b. 1919)
- August 25
  - Aaliyah, singer and actress, died in plane crash in Marsh Harbour, Abaco Islands, The Bahamas (b. 1979)
  - John Chambers, American make-up artist (b. 1922)
  - John L. Nelson, American jazz musician (b. 1916)
  - Diana Golden, American disabled ski racer (b. 1963)
- August 30 – Julie Bishop, film and television actress (b. 1914)
- August 31 – Crash Davis, American professional baseball player (b. 1919)

=== September ===
- September 2 – Troy Donahue, actor (b. 1936)
- September 3 – Thuy Trang, actress (b. 1973)
- September 4
  - Hank the Angry Drunken Dwarf, entertainer and radio personality (b. 1962)
  - Pete Brown, footballer (b. 1930)
- September 5 – Cawood Ledford, American radio announcer (Kentucky Wildcats) (b. 1926)
- September 7 – Glenn Thompson, American book publisher and activist (b. 1940)
- September 11
  - Alice Stewart Trillin, author and film producer (b. 1938)
  - At least 3,000 people died in the terrorist attacks of September 11, including but not limited to:
    - David Angell, producer. Passenger of American Airlines Flight 11 (b. 1946)
    - Todd Beamer, American airline passenger, United Airlines Flight 93 (b. 1969)
    - Berry Berenson, actress and photographer. Passenger of American Airlines Flight 11 (b. 1947)
    - Carolyn Beug, American filmmaker and video producer. Passenger of American Airlines Flight 11 (b. 1952)
    - Bill Biggart, photojournalist (b. 1947)
    - Mark Bingham, American airline passenger, United Airlines Flight 93 (b. 1970)
    - Ronald Paul Bucca, American fire marshal (b. 1953)
    - Charles Burlingame, airline pilot, American Airlines Flight 77 (b. 1949)
    - Tom Burnett, American airline passenger, United Airlines Flight 93 (b. 1963)
    - William E. Caswell, American physicist. Passenger of American Airlines Flight 77 (b. 1947)
    - Kevin Cosgrove, business executive (b. 1955)
    - Welles Crowther, investment banker (b. 1977)
    - William M. Feehan, Deputy fire commissioner (b. 1929)
    - Wilson Flagg, Rear Admiral (b. 1938)
    - Peter J. Ganci Jr., Chief of the Fire Department of New York (b. 1946)
    - Barbara Olson, lawyer and media personality (b. 1955)
    - Jeremy Glick, American airline passenger, United Airlines Flight 93 (b. 1970)
    - Lauren Grandcolas, American author. Passenger of United Airlines Flight 93 (b. 1962)
    - Nezam Hafiz, American cricketer (b. 1969)
    - Mohammad Salman Hamdani, American research technician (b. 1977)
    - LeRoy Homer Jr., American airline pilot, United Airlines Flight 93 (b. 1965)
    - Charles Edward Jones, American astronaut. Passenger of American Airlines Flight 11 (b. 1953)
    - Mychal Judge, Chaplain of the Fire Department of New York (b. 1933)
    - Neil David Levin, executive director of the Port Authority of New York and New Jersey (b. 1954)
    - Daniel M. Lewin, co-founder of Akamai Technologies. Passenger of American Airlines Flight 11 (b. 1970)
    - Eamon McEneaney, American lacrosse player (b. 1954)
    - Timothy Maude, Lieutenant General, U.S. Army (b. 1947)
    - John Ogonowski, American pilot, American Airlines Flight 11 (b. 1948)
    - John P. O'Neill, Counterterrorism expert (b. 1952)
    - Betty Ong, American flight attendant, American Airlines Flight 11 (b. 1956)
    - Orio Palmer, American firefighter (b. 1956)
    - Dominick Pezzulo, American police officer (b. 1965)
    - Sneha Anne Philip, American physician, presumed to have been a victim of the attacks (b. 1970)
    - Rick Rescorla, World Trade Center security chief for Morgan Stanley and Dean Witter (b. 1939 in England)
    - Michael Richards, Jamaican-born American sculptor (b. 1963)
    - Victor Saracini, American pilot, United Airlines Flight 175 (b. 1950)
    - Madeline Amy Sweeney, flight attendant, American Airlines Flight 11 (b. 1965)
    - Abraham Zelmanowitz, American computer programmer (b. 1945)
- September 13 – Dorothy McGuire, actress (b. 1916)
- September 15
  - Fred de Cordova, director and producer (b. 1910)
  - Richard Fegley, professional photographer (b. 1936)
- September 22 – Isaac Stern, violinist (b. 1920)
- September 25
  - John Powers, American professional baseball player (b. 1929)
  - Lani O’Grady, American actress (b. 1954)
- September 29 – Gloria Foster, American actress (b. 1933)

=== October ===
- October 5 – Mike Mansfield, American politician and diplomat. (b. 1903)
- October 7 – Chris Adams, English professional wrestler (b. 1955)
- October 9 – Dagmar, American actress, model and television personality (b. 1921)
- October 14 – Zhang Xueliang, Chinese ruler of Manchuria, died in Honolulu, Hawaii (b. 1901)
- October 19 – Joe Murray, American baseball player (b. 1921)
- October 22 – Norman Lessing, American television screenwriter, producer, playwright and chess player (b. 1911)

=== November ===
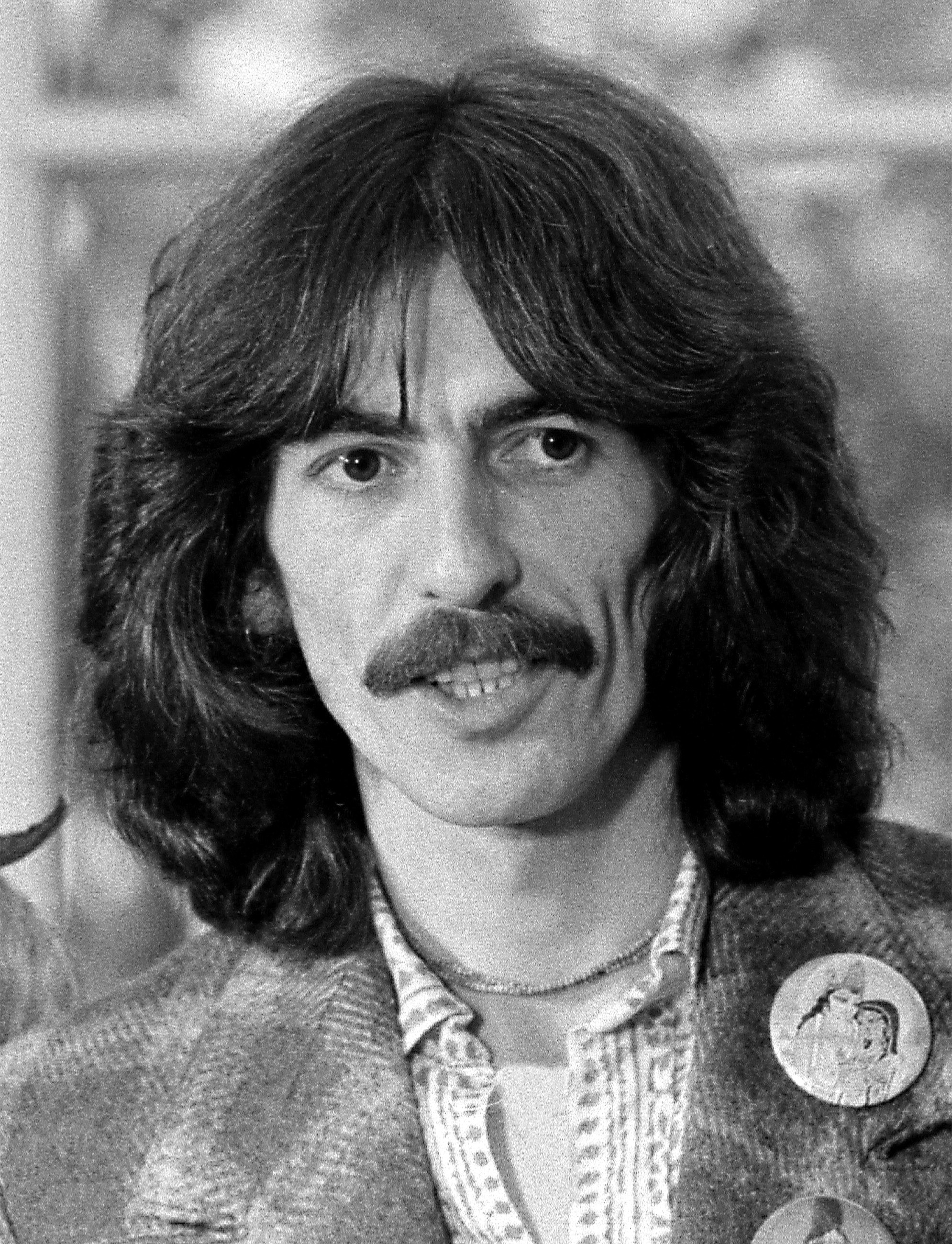
George Harrison

- November 5 – Milton William Cooper, American author and radio host (b. 1943)
- November 6 – John Simon White, Austrian-born American opera director. (b. 1940)
- November 7 – Bobby Bass, stunt performer (b. 1936)
- November 10 – Ken Kesey, American author (b. 1935)
- November 11 – Frederick Allen, politician (b. 1914)
- November 13 – Panama Francis, American swing jazz drummer (b. 1918)
- November 17
  - John M. Dawson, computational physicist (b. 1930)
  - Harrison A. Williams, politician (b. 1920)
- November 21 – Fritz Herzog, German-born American mathematician (b. 1903)
- November 22 – Mary Kay Ash, American businesswoman (b. 1918)
- November 29 – George Harrison, English guitarist, lead guitarist of The Beatles (b. 1943)

=== December ===
- December 13 – Chuck Schuldiner, singer and guitarist (born 1967)
- December 15 – Rufus Thomas, singer (born 1917)
- December 16 – Stuart Adamson, British guitarist and singer (born 1958)
- December 20 – Foster Brooks, actor and comedian (b. 1912)
- December 21
  - Dick Schaap, sportswriter and broadcaster (b. 1934)
  - Karl Winsch, baseball player and manager (born 1915)
- December 22 – Lance Loud, personality, columnist, and performer (born 1951)
- December 28 – Frankie Gaye, soul musician (born 1941)
- December 30
  - Ray Patterson, animator, producer, and director (born 1911)
  - Eileen Heckart, Oscar-winning actor (born 1919)

== See also ==
- 2001 in Afghanistan
- 2001 in American soccer
- 2001 in American television
- List of American films of 2001
- Timeline of United States history (1990–2009)
