= 1834 in the United States =

- Decades: 1810s; 1820s; 1830s; 1840s; 1850s
- See also: History of the United States (1789–1849); Timeline of United States history (1820–1859); List of years in the United States

Events from the year 1834 in the United States.

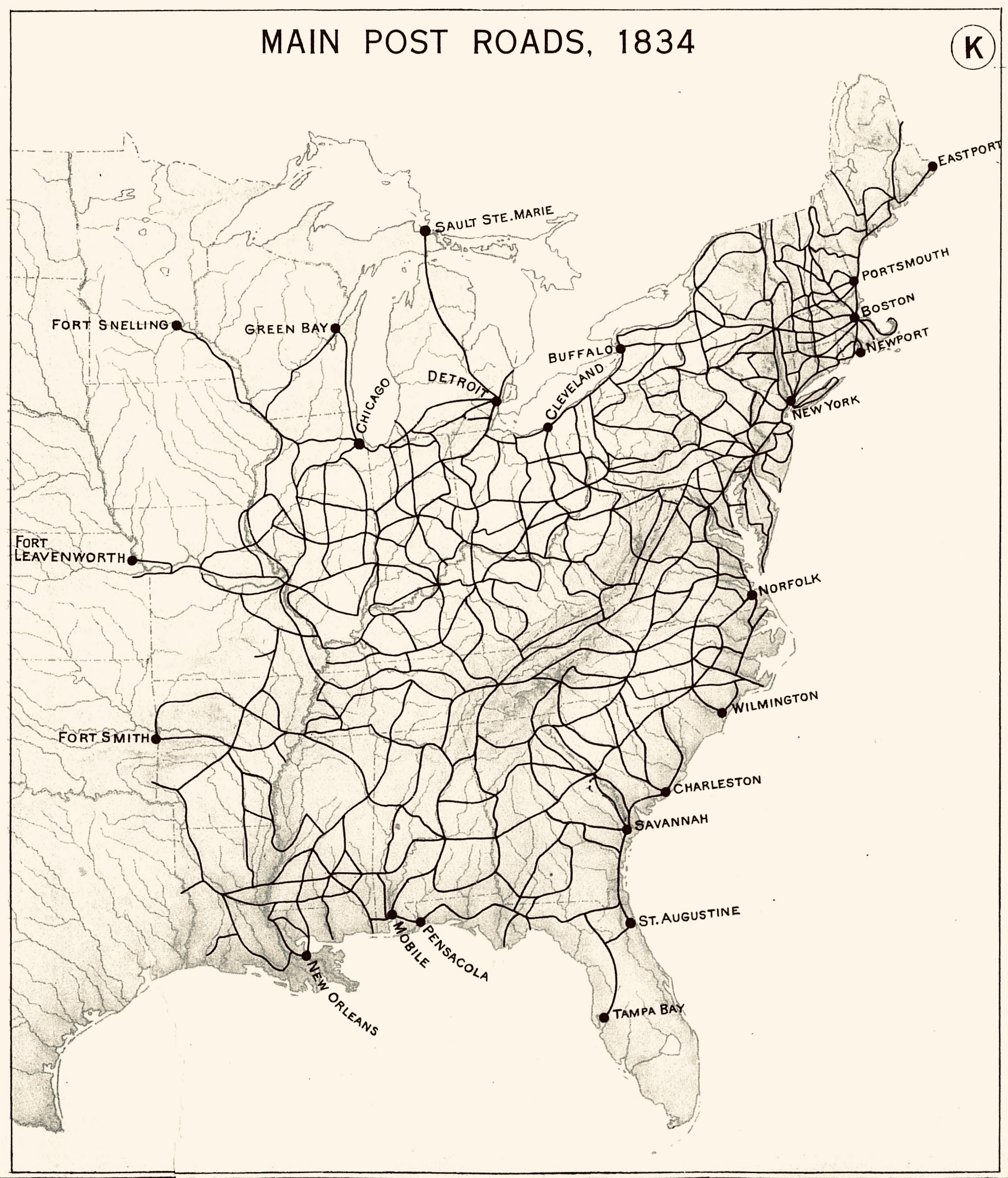
Main post roads 1834, mapped 1933

== Incumbents ==
=== Federal government ===
- President: Andrew Jackson (D-Tennessee)
- Vice President: Martin Van Buren (D-New York)
- Chief Justice: John Marshall (Virginia)
- Speaker of the House of Representatives:

Andrew Stevenson (D-Virginia) (until June 2)
John Bell (Whig-Tennessee) (starting June 2)

- Congress: 23rd

==== State governments ====
Governors and lieutenant governors

=== Governors ===
- Governor of Alabama: John Gayle (Democratic)
- Governor of Connecticut: Henry W. Edwards (Democratic) (until May 7), Samuel A. Foot (Whig) (starting May 7)
- Governor of Delaware: Caleb P. Bennett (Democratic)
- Governor of Georgia: Wilson Lumpkin (Democratic)
- Governor of Illinois:
  - until November 17: John Reynolds (Democratic)
  - November 17-December 3: William Lee D. Ewing (Democratic)
  - starting December 3: Joseph Duncan (Whig)
- Governor of Indiana: Noah Noble (Whig)
- Governor of Kentucky: John Breathitt (Democratic) (until February 21), James T. Morehead (National Republican) (starting February 21)
- Governor of Louisiana: André B. Roman (Whig)
- Governor of Maine: Samuel E. Smith (Democratic) (until January 1), Robert P. Dunlap (Democratic) (starting January 1)
- Governor of Maryland: James Thomas (Whig)
- Governor of Massachusetts: Levi Lincoln Jr. (National Republican) (until January 9), John Davis (Whig) (starting January 9)
- Governor of Mississippi: Hiram Runnels (Democratic)
- Governor of Missouri: Daniel Dunklin (Democratic)
- Governor of New Hampshire: Samuel Dinsmoor (Democratic) (until June 5), William Badger (Democratic) (starting June 5)
- Governor of New Jersey: Peter Dumont Vroom (Democratic)
- Governor of New York: William L. Marcy (Democratic)
- Governor of North Carolina: David Lowry Swain (National Republican)
- Governor of Ohio: Robert Lucas (Democratic)
- Governor of Pennsylvania: George Wolf (Democratic-Republican)
- Governor of Rhode Island: John Brown Francis (Democratic)
- Governor of South Carolina: Robert Young Hayne (Democratic) (until December 9), George McDuffie (Democratic) (starting December 9)
- Governor of Tennessee: William Carroll (Democratic)
- Governor of Vermont: William A. Palmer (Anti-Masonic)
- Governor of Virginia: John Floyd (Democratic) (until March 31), Littleton Waller Tazewell (Whig) (starting March 31)

=== Lieutenant governors ===
- Lieutenant Governor of Connecticut: Ebenezer Stoddard (Democratic-Republican) (until May 7), Thaddeus Betts (Whig) (starting May 7)
- Lieutenant Governor of Illinois: William Lee D. Ewing (Democratic) (until December 5), Alexander M. Jenkins (Democratic) (starting December 5)
- Lieutenant Governor of Indiana: David Wallace (Whig)
- Lieutenant Governor of Kentucky: James T. Morehead (Democratic)
- Lieutenant Governor of Massachusetts: Samuel T. Armstrong (political party unknown)
- Lieutenant Governor of Missouri: Lilburn Boggs (Democratic)
- Lieutenant Governor of New York: John Tracy (Democratic)
- Lieutenant Governor of Rhode Island: Jeffrey Hazard (political party unknown)
- Lieutenant Governor of South Carolina: Charles Cotesworth Pinckney (Democratic) (until December 9), Whitemarsh B. Seabrook (Democratic) (starting month and day unknown)
- Lieutenant Governor of Vermont: Lebbeus Egerton (Anti-Masonic)

== Events ==
- January 25 – Hillsborough County is created by Florida's territorial legislature.
- March 11 – Survey of the Coast transferred to the Department of the Navy.
- March 28 – The United States Senate censures President Andrew Jackson for his actions in defunding the Second Bank of the United States (censure expunged in 1837).
- April 14 – The Whig Party is officially named by United States Senator Henry Clay.
- June 30 – the 6th Indian Trade and Intercourse Act is updated and renewed Indian Territory is effective.
- July 7–10 – Anti-abolitionist riots break out in New York City.
- July 29 – The Office of Indian Affairs is organized.
- August 11–12 – Ursuline Convent Riots: A convent of Ursuline nuns is burned near Boston.
- October 31 – Solon Robinson settled in the location that would eventually become Crown Point, Indiana.
- November 4 – Delta Upsilon fraternity founded at Williams College.
- November 11 – The rare 1804 dollar coin is struck by the United States Mint.

=== Undated ===
- Worcester Academy is founded as the Worcester County Manual Labor High School.
- Franklin College is founded in Franklin, Indiana.
- The Medical College of Louisiana is founded in New Orleans, which later becomes Tulane University.
- Wake Forest College is founded in Wake Forest, which later becomes Wake Forest University.
- The Wilmington and Raleigh Railroad is chartered in Wilmington, North Carolina, and begins construction.

== Births ==
- January 9 – Wilkinson Call, U.S. Senator from Florida from 1879 to 1897 (died 1910)
- January 15 – Samuel Arza Davenport, politician (died 1911)
- February 27 – Charles C. Carpenter, admiral (died 1899)
- March 4 – James W. McDill, U.S. Senator from Iowa from 1881 to 1883 (died 1894)
- March 5
  - Martha Parmelee Rose, journalist, social reformer, philanthropist (died 1923)
  - U. M. Rose, Arkansas lawyer (died 1913)
- March 15 – John K. Bucklyn, Medal of Honor recipient (died 1906)
- March 20 – Charles W. Eliot, president of Harvard University (died 1926)
- March 24 – John Wesley Powell, explorer (died 1902)
- March 27 – Melissa Elizabeth Banta, poet, travel writer (died 1907)
- April 1 – Big Jim Fisk, entrepreneur (died 1872)
- April 5 – Frank R. Stockton, short story writer (died 1902)
- April 26 – Charles Farrar Browne ("Artemus Ward"), humorist (died 1867)
- June 22 – William Chester Minor, Ceylonese-born surgeon and lexicographer (died 1920)
- June 24 – George Arnold, writer and poet (died 1865)
- June 28 – Samuel Pasco, British-born U.S. Senator from Florida from 1887 to 1899 (died 1917)
- July 10 – James Abbott McNeill Whistler, painter and etcher (died 1903 in the United Kingdom)
- July 19 – Benjamin F. Jonas, U.S. Senator from Louisiana from 1879 to 1885 (died 1911)
- August 22 – Samuel Pierpont Langley, astronomer, physicist and aeronautics pioneer (died 1906)
- August 27 – James B. Eustis, U.S. Senator from Louisiana from 1876 to 1879 and from 1885 to 1891 (died 1899)
- September 5 – John G. Carlisle, U.S. Senator from Kentucky from 1890 to 1893 (died 1910)
- September 6 – Samuel Arnold, conspirator involved in the plot to kidnap U.S. President Abraham Lincoln in 1865 (died 1906)
- October 6 – Walter Kittredge, composer (died 1905)
- October 9 – Rufus Blodgett, U.S. Senator from New Jersey from 1887 to 1893 (died 1910)
- October 31 – Knowles Shaw, evangelist and hymnwriter (died 1878 in railroad accident)
- November 21 – Hetty Green, businesswoman (died 1916)
- November 24 – Susan Hammond Barney, American social activist and evangelist (died 1922)
- December 6 – Henry W. Blair, U.S. Senator from New Hampshire from 1879 to 1891 (died 1920)
- December 15 – Charles Augustus Young, astronomer (died 1908)
- December 24 – Charles W. Jones, Ireland-born U.S. Senator from Florida from 1875 to 1887 (died 1897)

== Deaths ==
- February 2 – Lorenzo Dow, minister (born 1777)
- February 18 – William Wirt, 9th United States Attorney General (born 1772)
- February 28 – Isaac D. Barnard, U.S. Senator from 1827 to 1831 (born 1791)
- May 20 – Marquis de Lafayette, French aristocrat and military officer who fought in the American Revolutionary War, died in France (born 1757 in France)
- July 26 - Jonathan Jennings, first governor of Indiana (born 1784)
- August 24 – William Kelly, U.S. Senator from Alabama from 1822 to 1825 (born 1786)
- September 15 – William H. Crawford, politician and judge (born 1772)
- October 10 – Thomas Say, naturalist (born 1787)
- October 31 Éleuthère Irénée du Pont, chemical manufacturer (born 1771 in France)

== See also ==
- Timeline of United States history (1820–1859)
- Timeline of the Andrew Jackson presidency § 1834
