= 1836 in the United States =

- Decades: 1810s; 1820s; 1830s; 1840s; 1850s
- See also: History of the United States (1789–1849); Timeline of United States history (1820–1859); List of years in the United States

Events from the year 1836 in the United States. Exceptionally, this page covers not only the history of the United States, but also that of the Republic of Texas in 1836.

== Incumbents ==
=== Federal government ===
- President: Andrew Jackson (D-Tennessee)
- Vice President: Martin Van Buren (D-New York)
- Chief Justice: Roger B. Taney (Maryland)
- Speaker of the House of Representatives: James K. Polk (D-Tennessee)
- Congress: 24th

==== State governments ====
Governors and lieutenant governors

=== Governors ===
- Governor of Alabama: Clement Comer Clay (Democratic)
- Governor of Arkansas:
  - until June 15: William S. Fulton (Democratic)
  - June 15 – September 13: vacant
  - starting September 13: James Sevier Conway (Democratic)
- Governor of Connecticut: Henry W. Edwards (Democratic)
- Governor of Delaware: Caleb P. Bennett (Democratic) (until July 11), Charles Polk Jr. (Whig) (starting July 11)
- Governor of Georgia: William Schley (Democratic)
- Governor of Illinois: Joseph Duncan (Whig)
- Governor of Indiana: Noah Noble (Whig)
- Governor of Kentucky: James T. Morehead (National Republican) (until August 30), James Clark (starting August 30)
- Governor of Louisiana: Edward Douglass White Sr. (Whig)
- Governor of Maine: Robert P. Dunlap (Democratic)
- Governor of Maryland: James Thomas (Whig) (until January 14), Thomas W. Veazey (Whig) (starting January 14)
- Governor of Massachusetts: Samuel Turell Armstrong (Whig) (until January 13), Edward Everett (Whig) (starting January 13)
- Governor of Mississippi: John A. Quitman (Whig) (until January 7), Charles Lynch (Democratic) (starting January 7)
- Governor of Missouri: Daniel Dunklin (Democratic) (until September 30), Lilburn W. Boggs (Democratic) (starting September 30)
- Governor of New Hampshire: William Badger (Democratic) (until June 2), Isaac Hill (Democratic) (starting June 2)
- Governor of New Jersey: Peter Dumont Vroom (Democratic) (until November 3), Philemon Dickerson (Democratic) (starting November 3)
- Governor of New York: William L. Marcy (Democratic)
- Governor of North Carolina: Richard Dobbs Spaight Jr. (Democratic) (until December 31), Edward Bishop Dudley (Whig) (starting December 31)
- Governor of Ohio: Robert Lucas (Democratic) (until December 12), Joseph Vance (Whig) (starting December 12)
- Governor of Pennsylvania: Joseph Ritner (Anti-Masonic)
- Governor of Rhode Island: John Brown Francis (Democratic)
- Governor of South Carolina: George McDuffie (Democratic) (until December 10), Pierce Mason Butler (Democratic) (starting December 10)
- Governor of Tennessee: Newton Cannon (Whig)
- Governor of Vermont: Silas H. Jennison (Whig)
- Governor of Virginia: Littleton Waller Tazewell (Whig) (until April 30), Wyndham Robertson (Whig) (starting April 30)

=== Lieutenant governors ===
- Lieutenant Governor of Connecticut: Ebenezer Stoddard (Democratic-Republican)
- Lieutenant Governor of Illinois: Alexander M. Jenkins (Democratic) (until December 9), William H. Davidson (Democratic) (starting December 9)
- Lieutenant Governor of Indiana: David Wallace (Whig)
- Lieutenant Governor of Kentucky: Charles A. Wickliffe (Democratic-Republican) (starting August 31)
- Lieutenant Governor of Massachusetts: Samuel T. Armstrong (political party unknown) (until January 13), George Hull (Whig) (starting January 13)
- Lieutenant Governor of Missouri:
  - until September 30: Lilburn Boggs (Democratic)
  - September 30 – November 21: vacant
  - starting November 21: Franklin Cannon (Democratic)
- Lieutenant Governor of New York: John Tracy (Democratic)
- Lieutenant Governor of Rhode Island: George Engs (political party unknown) (until month and day unknown), Jeffrey Hazard (political party unknown) (starting month and day unknown)
- Lieutenant Governor of South Carolina: Whitemarsh B. Seabrook (Democratic) (until December 10), William DuBose (Democratic) (starting December 10)
- Lieutenant Governor of Vermont: Silas H. Jennison (Whig) (until month and day unknown), David M. Camp (Whig) (starting month and day unknown)

== Events ==
=== January–March ===
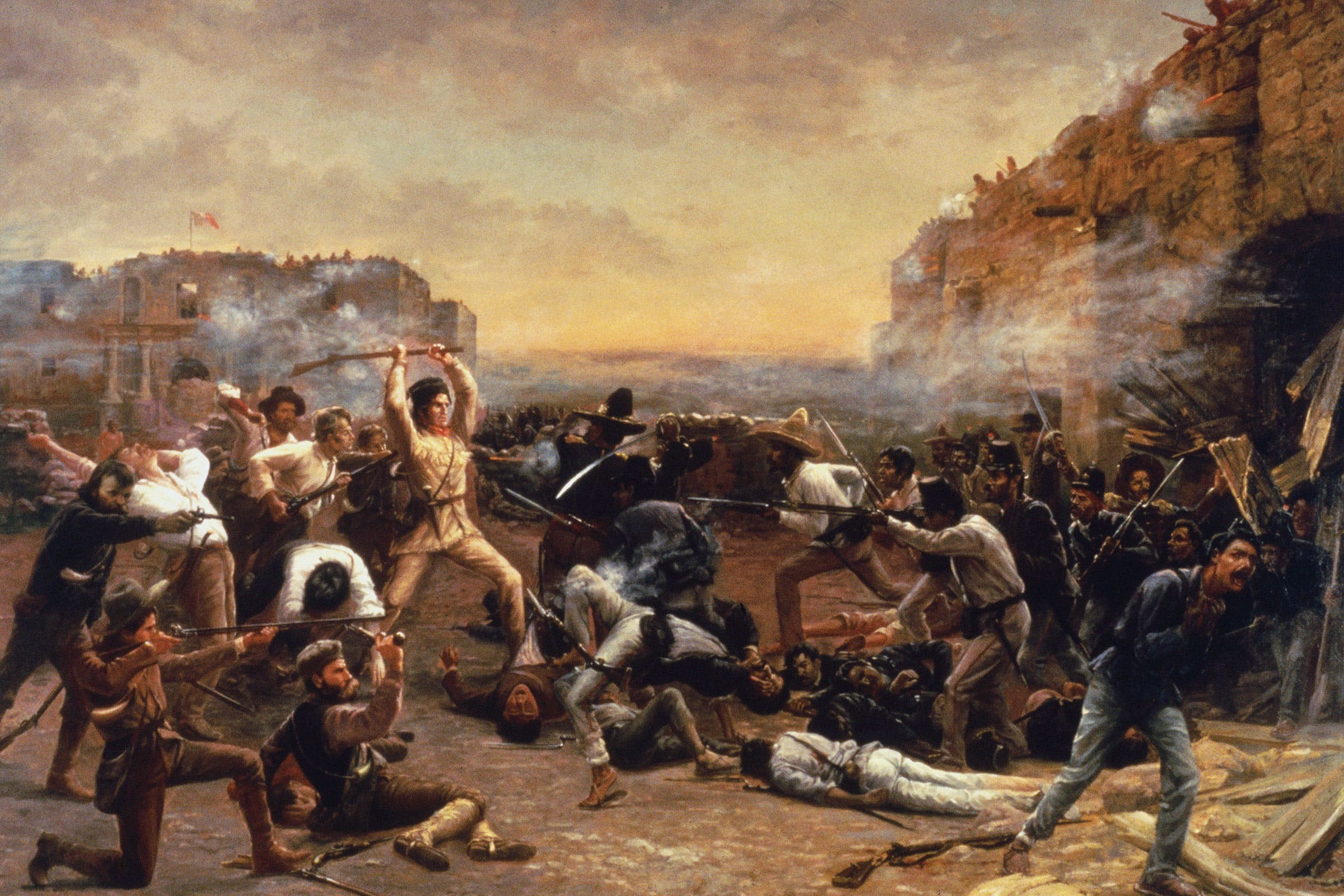
February 23 – March 6: Battle of the Alamo

- January 5 – Davy Crockett arrives in Texas, which at this time is not part of the United States.
- January 18 – Dade County, Florida, is formed.
- February 3 – United States Whig Party holds its first convention in Albany, New York.
- February 5 – Henry Roe Campbell builds the first 4-4-0, a steam locomotive type that will soon become the most common on all railroads of the United States.
- February 23 – Battle of the Alamo: The siege of the Alamo begins in San Antonio, Texas.
- February 25 – Samuel Colt receives an American patent for the Colt revolver, the first practical adaptation of the revolving flintlock pistol.
- March 1 – At the Convention of 1836, delegates from 57 Texas communities convene in Washington-on-the-Brazos to deliberate independence from Mexico.
- March 2 – At the Convention of 1836, the Republic of Texas declares independence from Mexico.
- March 6 – The Battle of the Alamo ends; 189 Texans are slaughtered by about 1,600 Mexicans.
- March 17 – Texas abolishes the slave trade.
- March 27
  - Texas Revolution: Goliad massacre – Antonio López de Santa Anna orders the Mexican army to kill about 400 Texans at Goliad, Texas.
  - U.S. Survey of the Coast returned to U.S. Treasury Department as the U.S. Coast Survey.
- March 31 – Marshall College, named for John Marshall, opens in Mercersburg, Pennsylvania. It later merges with Franklin College to become Franklin and Marshall College in Lancaster, Pennsylvania.

=== April–June ===
- April 20 – U.S. Congress passes act creating the Wisconsin Territory.
- April 21 – Texas Revolution: Battle of San Jacinto – Republic of Texas forces under Sam Houston defeat troops under Mexican General Antonio López de Santa Anna. (Santa Anna and hundreds of his troops are taken prisoner along the San Jacinto River the next day.)
- April 22 – Texas Revolution: A day after the Battle of San Jacinto, forces under Texas General Sam Houston capture Mexican General Antonio López de Santa Anna.
- May 4 – The Ancient Order of Hibernians, an Irish Catholic fraternal organization, is founded in New York City.
- May 19 – Fort Parker massacre: Among those captured by Native Americans is 9-year-old Cynthia Ann Parker; she later gives birth to a son named Quanah, who becomes the last chief of the Comanche.
- June 15 – Arkansas is admitted as the 25th U.S. state (see History of Arkansas).
- June 28 – James Madison, the fourth president of the United States and United States Secretary of State, dies in Montpelier, Virginia.

=== July–September ===
- July 3 – Wisconsin Territory is effective.
- July 8 – Valparaiso, Indiana is incorporated.
- July 11 – President Andrew Jackson issues the Specie Circular, beginning the failure of the land speculation economy that will lead to the Panic of 1837.
- July 13 – U.S. patent #1 is granted after filing 9,957 unnumbered patents.
- July 30 – The first English language newspaper is published in Hawaii.
- August 1 – Abolition Riot of 1836 in the Massachusetts Supreme Judicial Court: Two fugitive slave women are freed from the courtroom by spectators.
- August 30 – The city of Houston, Texas, is founded.
- September 1 – Narcissa Whitman, one of the first white women to settle west of the Rocky Mountains, arrives at Walla Walla, Washington.
- September 5 – Sam Houston is elected as the first president of the Republic of Texas.
- September 8 – Transcendental Club founded in Cambridge, Massachusetts.

=== October–December ===
December 7: Martin Van Buren elected president

- October 15 – Alexander Twilight becomes the first African American elected to public office, joining the Vermont House of Representatives.
- October 22 – Sam Houston is inaugurated as first elected president of the Republic of Texas.
- December 4 – Whig Party holds its first national convention, in Harrisburg, Pennsylvania.
- December 7 – 1836 United States presidential election: Martin Van Buren defeats William Henry Harrison.
- December 10 – Emory College, the forerunner of Emory University, is chartered in Oxford, Georgia.
- December 14 – The Toledo War, the mostly bloodless boundary dispute between Ohio and the adjoining Michigan Territory, is unofficially ended by a resolution passed by the controversial "Frostbitten Convention".
- December 15 – The United States Patent Office burns in Washington, D.C.
- December 20 – Sudden freeze kills many travelers in Illinois.
- December 23 – Georgia Female College, the forerunner of Wesleyan College, is chartered in Macon, Georgia as the first college for women in the U.S.

=== Undated ===
- American Temperance Union established.
- First McGuffey Readers published.
- The first printed literature in Assyrian Neo-Aramaic is produced by Justin Perkins, an American Presbyterian missionary.
- The New Board brokerage group is founded in New York City.
- James Peter Allaire's company, the Howell Works, is at its peak.
- George Catlin ends his 6-year tour of 50 tribes in the Dakota Territory.

=== Ongoing ===
- Second Seminole War (1835–1842)

== Births ==
- January 10 – Charles Ingalls, settler father of Laura Ingalls Wilder (died 1902)
- January 14 – Hugh Judson Kilpatrick, army officer, diplomat and politician (died 1881)
- February 5 – William E. Miller soldier and Pennsylvania State Senator (died 1919)
- February 9 – Franklin B. Gowen, industrialist (died 1889)
- February 24 – Winslow Homer, landscape painter and printmaker (died 1910)
- February 27 – Russell A. Alger, U.S. Senator from Michigan from 1902 to 1907 (died 1907)
- March 2 – John W. Foster, journalist and politician (died 1917)
- March 20 – Ferris Jacobs Jr., politician (died 1886)
- April 20 – Eli Whitney Blake, Jr., scientist and academic (died 1895)
- April 27 – Charles Bendire, U.S. Army officer and ornithologist (died 1897)
- May 7 – Joseph Gurney Cannon, Speaker of the U.S. House of Representatives from 1903 to 1911 (died 1926)
- May 23 – Touch the Clouds (Maȟpíya Ičáȟtagya), Native American chieftain of Teton Lakota Sioux (died 1905)
- May 27 – Jay Gould, railroad developer and speculator (died 1892)
- June 15 – George L. Shoup, U.S. Senator from Idaho from 1890 to 1901 (died 1904)
- June 16 – Wesley Merritt, U.S. Army general (died 1910)
- June 28 – Lyman J. Gage, financier and presidential Cabinet officer (died 1927)
- June 29 – Thomas Philander Ryder, composer, organist, teacher, conductor and organ builder (died 1887)
- July 26 – Ellen Maria Colfax, wife of Schuyler Colfax, Second Lady of the United States (died 1911)
- August 5 – John T. Raymond, born John O'Brien, actor (died 1887)
- August 11 – Sarah Morgan Bryan Piatt, poet (died 1919)
- August 25 – Bret Harte, writer of fiction and poetry (died 1902)
- September 10 – Joseph Wheeler, U.S. Army general and politician (died 1906)
- September 11 – Fitz Hugh Ludlow, writer (died 1870)
- September 18 – William Jackson Palmer, railroad civil engineer, Union Army general, industrialist and philanthropist (died 1909)
- October 10 – William D. Hoard, politician and publisher, governor of Wisconsin (died 1918)
- November 1 – George E. Spencer, U.S. Senator from Alabama from 1868 to 1879 (died 1893)
- November 8 – Milton Bradley, game pioneer and businessman (died 1911)
- November 11 – Thomas Bailey Aldrich, editor, poet and novelist (died 1907)
- December 19 – Maria Sanford, American educator (died 1920)

== Deaths ==
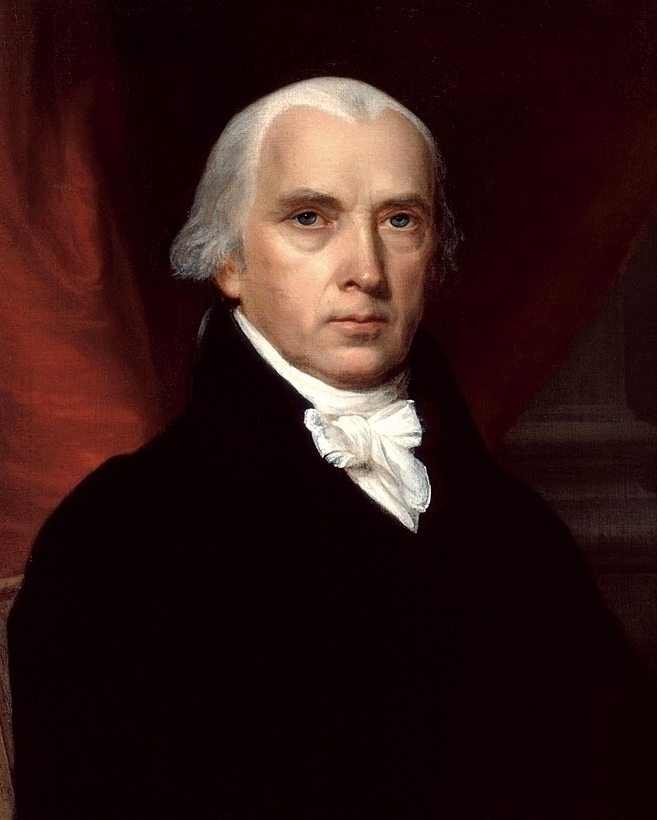
James Madison

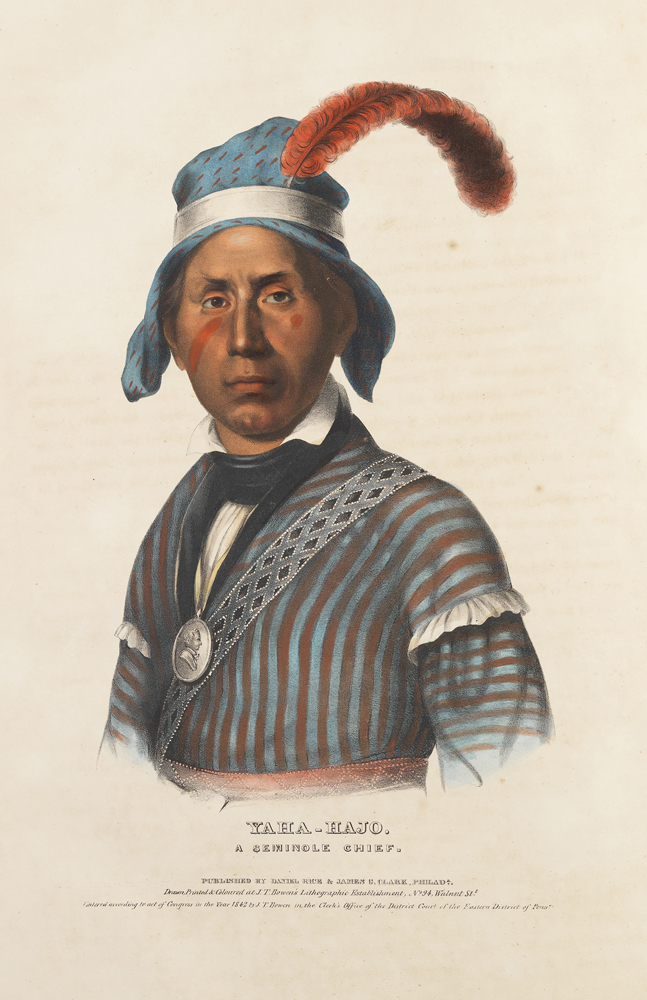
Ya-ha Hadjo

- January 30 – Betsy Ross, flagmaker (born 1752)
- February 18 – Cornplanter (Gaiänt'wakê), Seneca chief (b. 1750)
- February 23 – Ezra Ames, portrait painter (born 1768)
- March 6 (at the Battle of the Alamo)
  - James Bowie, Texas revolutionary (born 1796)
  - Davy Crockett, king of the wild frontier (born 1786)
  - William Barret Travis, Texas revolutionary (born 1809)
- March 16 – Nathaniel Bowditch, mathematician (born 1773)
- March 27 – James Fannin, Texas Revolutionary (born 1804)
- March 29 – Ya-ha Hadjo, Creek diplomat and war chief, reported killed near the Ocklawaha River in central Florida
- April 29 – Simon Kenton, frontiersman and Revolutionary War militia general (born 1755)
- June 9 – Supply Belcher, composer and singer (born 1751)
- June 25 – Jesse Bledsoe, U.S. Senator from Kentucky from 1813 to 1814 (born 1776)
- June 28 – James Madison, fourth president of the United States from 1809 to 1817 (born 1751)
- July 17 – William White, 1st and 4th presiding bishop of the Episcopal Church (born 1748)
- September 14 – Aaron Burr, third vice president of the United States from 1801 to 1805 (born 1756)
- October 10 – Martha Jefferson Randolph, Acting First Lady of the United States from 1801 to 1809 (born 1772)
- November – Tenskwatawa, Shawnee prophet and political leader (born 1775)
- November 21 – Major David Moniac, first Native American West Point graduate, killed at Battle of Wahoo Swamp (born 1802)
- December 27 – Stephen F. Austin, pioneer (born 1793)

== See also ==
- Timeline of United States history (1820–1859)
- Timeline of the Andrew Jackson presidency § 1836
