= 1906 in the United States =

- Decades: 1880s; 1890s; 1900s; 1910s; 1920s
- See also: History of the United States (1865–1918); Timeline of United States history (1900–1929); List of years in the United States

Events from the year 1906 in the United States.

== Incumbents ==
=== Federal government ===
- President: Theodore Roosevelt (R-New York)
- Vice President: Charles W. Fairbanks (R-Indiana)
- Chief Justice: Melville Fuller (Illinois)
- Speaker of the House of Representatives: Joseph Gurney Cannon (R-Illinois)
- Congress: 59th

==== State governments ====
Governors and lieutenant governors

=== Governors ===
- Governor of Alabama: William D. Jelks (Democratic)
- Governor of Arkansas: Jeff Davis (Democratic)
- Governor of California: George Pardee (Republican)
- Governor of Colorado: Jesse Fuller McDonald (Republican)
- Governor of Connecticut: Henry Roberts (Republican)
- Governor of Delaware: Preston Lea (Republican)
- Governor of Florida: Napoleon B. Broward (Democratic)
- Governor of Georgia: Joseph M. Terrell (Democratic)
- Governor of Idaho: Frank R. Gooding (Republican)
- Governor of Illinois: Charles S. Deneen (Republican)
- Governor of Indiana: J. Frank Hanly (Republican)
- Governor of Iowa: Albert B. Cummins (Republican)
- Governor of Kansas: Edward W. Hoch (Republican)
- Governor of Kentucky: J. C. W. Beckham (Democratic)
- Governor of Louisiana: Newton Crain Blanchard (Democratic)
- Governor of Maine: William T. Cobb (Republican)
- Governor of Maryland: Edwin Warfield (Democratic)
- Governor of Massachusetts: William L. Douglas (Democratic) (until January 4), Curtis Guild, Jr. (Republican) (starting January 4)
- Governor of Michigan: Fred M. Warner (Republican)
- Governor of Minnesota: John A. Johnson (Democratic)
- Governor of Mississippi: James K. Vardaman (Democratic)
- Governor of Missouri: Joseph W. Folk (Democratic)
- Governor of Montana: Joseph Toole (Democratic)
- Governor of Nebraska: John H. Mickey (Republican)
- Governor of Nevada: John Sparks (Silver)
- Governor of New Hampshire: John McLane (Republican)
- Governor of New Jersey: Edward C. Stokes (Republican)
- Governor of New York: Frank W. Higgins (Republican) (until end of December 31)
- Governor of North Carolina: Robert Broadnax Glenn (Democratic)
- Governor of North Dakota: Elmore Y. Sarles (Republican)
- Governor of Ohio:
  - until January 8: Myron T. Herrick (Republican)
  - January 8-June 18: John M. Pattison (Democratic)
  - starting June 18: Andrew L. Harris (Republican)
- Governor of Oregon: George Chamberlain (Democratic)
- Governor of Pennsylvania: Samuel W. Pennypacker (Republican)
- Governor of Rhode Island: George H. Utter (Republican)
- Governor of South Carolina: Duncan Clinch Heyward (Democratic)
- Governor of South Dakota: Samuel H. Elrod (Republican)
- Governor of Tennessee: John I. Cox (Democratic)
- Governor of Texas: S. W. T. Lanham (Democratic)
- Governor of Utah: John Christopher Cutler (Republican)
- Governor of Vermont: Charles J. Bell (Republican) (until October 3), Fletcher D. Proctor (Republican) (starting October 3)
- Governor of Virginia: Andrew Jackson Montague (Democratic) (until February 1), Claude A. Swanson (Democratic) (starting February 10)
- Governor of Washington: Albert E. Mead (Republican)
- Governor of West Virginia: William M. O. Dawson (Republican)
- Governor of Wisconsin: Robert M. La Follette, Sr. (Republican) (until January 1), James O. Davidson (Republican) (starting January 1)
- Governor of Wyoming: Bryant B. Brooks (Republican)

=== Lieutenant governors ===
- Lieutenant Governor of Alabama: Russell M. Cunningham (Democratic)
- Lieutenant Governor of California: Alden Anderson (Republican)
- Lieutenant Governor of Colorado: Fred W. Parks (Republican)
- Lieutenant Governor of Connecticut: Rollin S. Woodruff (Republican)
- Lieutenant Governor of Delaware: Isaac T. Parker (Republican)
- Lieutenant Governor of Idaho: Burpee L. Steeves (Republican)
- Lieutenant Governor of Illinois: Lawrence Sherman (Republican)
- Lieutenant Governor of Indiana: Hugh T. Miller (Republican)
- Lieutenant Governor of Iowa: John Herriott (Republican)
- Lieutenant Governor of Kansas: David J. Hanna (Republican)
- Lieutenant Governor of Kentucky: William P. Thorne (Democratic)
- Lieutenant Governor of Louisiana: Jared Y. Sanders, Sr. (Democratic)
- Lieutenant Governor of Massachusetts: Curtis Guild, Jr. (Republican) (until January 4), Eben Sumner Draper (Republican) (starting January 4)
- Lieutenant Governor of Michigan: Alexander Maitland (Republican)
- Lieutenant Governor of Minnesota: Ray W. Jones (Republican)
- Lieutenant Governor of Mississippi: John Prentiss Carter (Democratic)
- Lieutenant Governor of Missouri: John C. McKinley (Republican)
- Lieutenant Governor of Montana: Edwin L. Norris (Democratic)
- Lieutenant Governor of Nebraska: Edmund G. McGilton (Republican)
- Lieutenant Governor of Nevada: Lemuel Allen (political party unknown)
- Lieutenant Governor of New York:
  - until December 5: Matthew Linn Bruce (Republican)
  - December 5 to end of December 31: John Raines (Republican)
- Lieutenant Governor of North Carolina: Francis D. Winston (Democratic)
- Lieutenant Governor of North Dakota: David Bartlett (Republican)
- Lieutenant Governor of Ohio:
  - until January 8: Warren G. Harding (Republican)
  - January 8-June 18: Andrew L. Harris (Republican)
  - starting June 18: vacant
- Lieutenant Governor of Pennsylvania: William M. Brown (Republican)
- Lieutenant Governor of Rhode Island: Frederick Jackson (Republican)
- Lieutenant Governor of South Carolina: John Sloan (Democratic)
- Lieutenant Governor of South Dakota: John E. McDougall (Republican)
- Lieutenant Governor of Tennessee: Ernest Rice (Democratic)
- Lieutenant Governor of Texas: George D. Neal (Democratic)
- Lieutenant Governor of Vermont: Charles H. Stearns (Republican) (until October 4), George H. Prouty (Republican) (starting October 4)
- Lieutenant Governor of Virginia: Joseph Edward Willard (Democratic) (until February 1), James Taylor Ellyson (Democratic) (starting February 1)
- Lieutenant Governor of Washington: Charles E. Coon (Republican)
- Lieutenant Governor of Wisconsin: James O. Davidson (Republican)

== Events ==
=== January–March ===
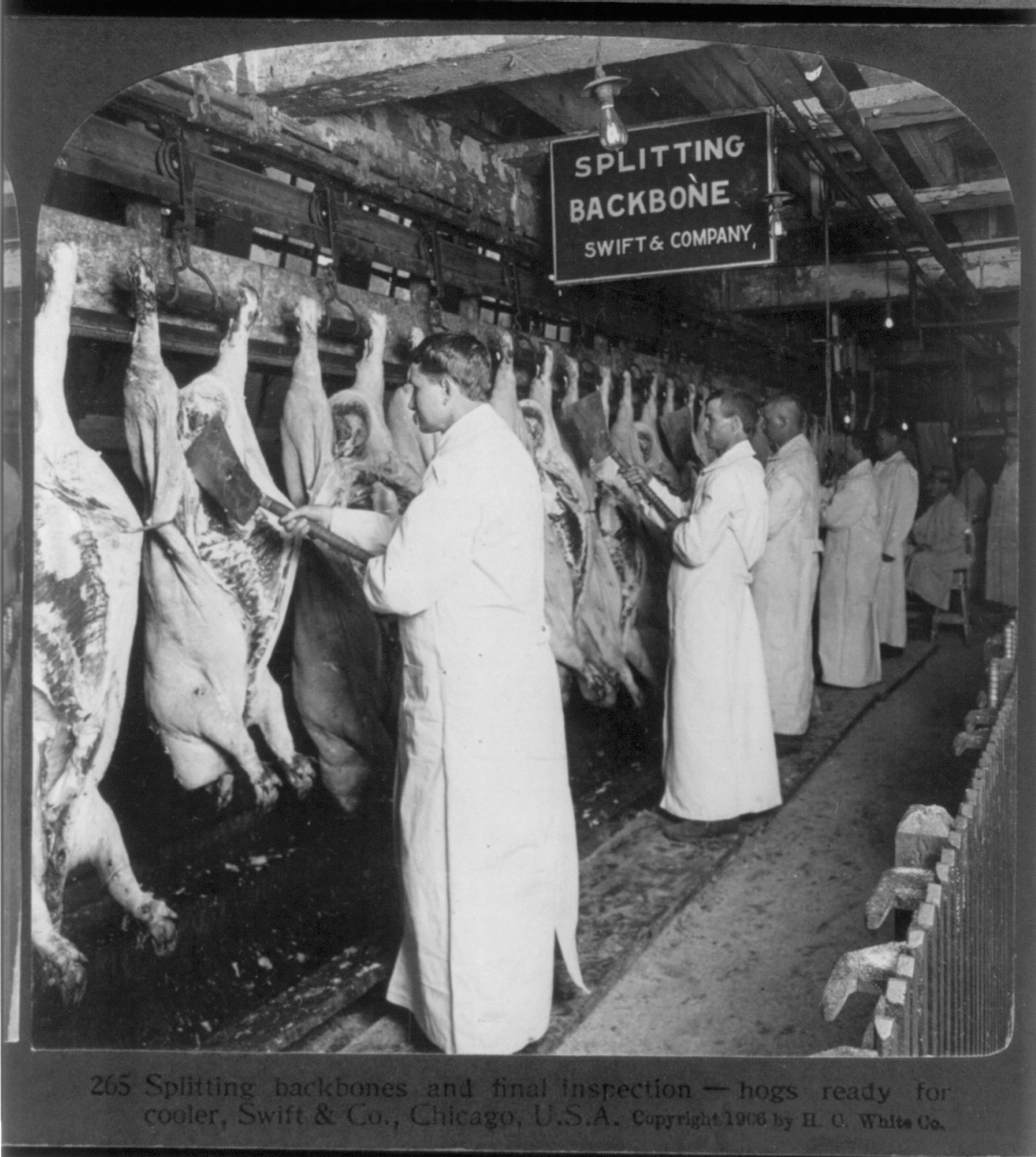
February 26: The Jungle exposes corruption in the meat packing industry.

- January 8 – A landslide in Haverstraw, New York kills 21 people.
- February 26 – Upton Sinclair publishes The Jungle, a novel depicting the life of a contemporary immigrant family in Chicago working in the meat packing industry.
- March 4 – Native American tribal governments are terminated in Indian Territory, a prerequisite for creating the U.S. state of Oklahoma in 1907.

=== April–June ===
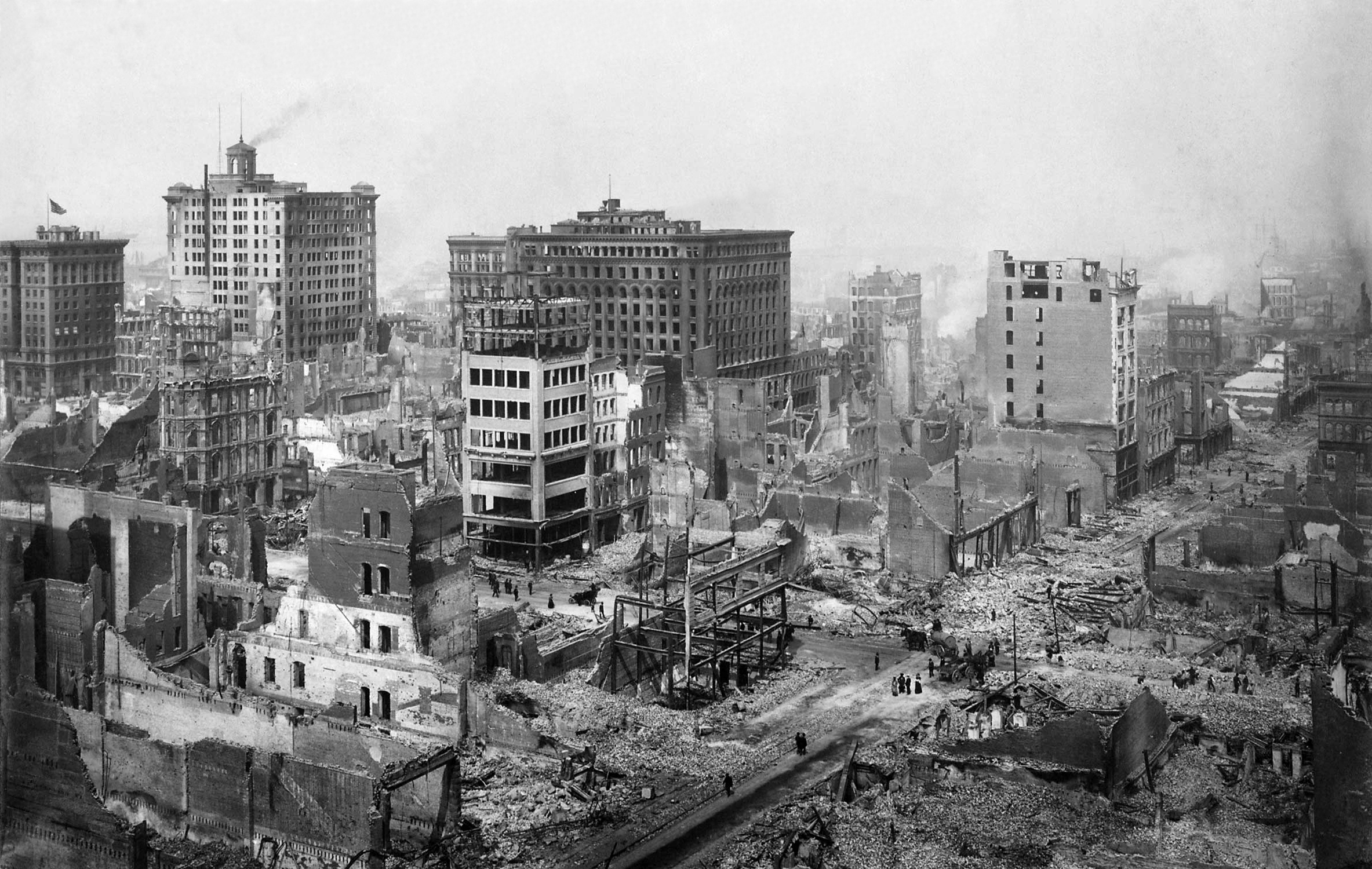
April 18: 1906 San Francisco earthquake.

- April 5 – The Maryland General Assembly authorises the erection of the Union Soldiers and Sailors Monument in Baltimore.
- April 14 – The first service is held at African Methodist Episcopal Church in Los Angeles by W. J. Seymour, in a series later known as the Azusa Street Revival, an event which launches the Pentecostal movement in Christianity.
- April 18 – The 1906 San Francisco earthquake (estimated magnitude 7.8) on the San Andreas Fault destroys much of San Francisco, California, killing at least 3,000 people, with 225,000–300,000 left homeless, and $350,000,000 in damages.
- May 27 – The first inmates are moved to the Culion leper colony by the American Insular Government of the Philippine Islands.
- June – Josephine Terranova is acquitted by a New York City jury of the murder of abusive relatives.
- June 6 – Durham and Southern Railway operates its first revenue train, Bonsal to Durham, North Carolina.
- June 8 – Theodore Roosevelt signs the Antiquities Act into law, authorizing the president to restrict the use of certain parcels of public land with historical or conservation value.
- June 16 – Oklahoma Enabling Act
- June 18 – The Lake County Times (later The Times of Northwest Indiana) begins publication.
- June 25 – Harry K. Thaw shoots architect Stanford White at the roof garden theatre of Madison Square Garden (designed by White) in New York City.
- June 28 – Osage Allotment Act allocates land to members of the Osage Nation in Oklahoma.
- June 29 – Mesa Verde is declared a National Park.
- June 30 – The United States Congress passes the Meat Inspection Act and Pure Food and Drug Act.

=== July–September ===
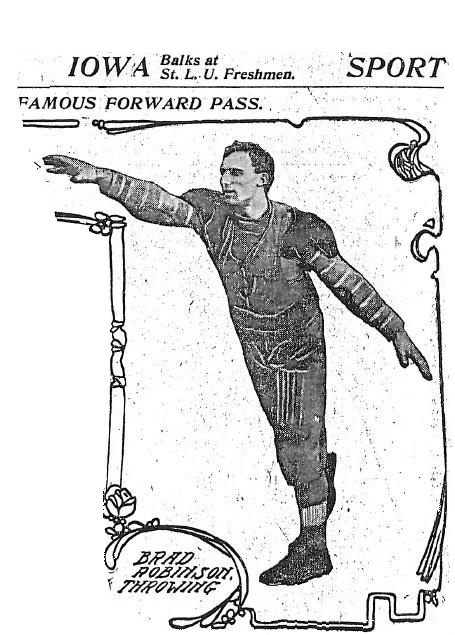
September 5: The first legal forward pass in an American football.

- July 11 – Murder of Grace Brown, a factory worker whose killing causes a nationwide sensation.
- July 14 – Gary, Indiana is founded by the United States Steel Corporation.
- August 23 – Unable to control a rebellion in the newly formed Cuban Republic, President Tomás Estrada Palma requests U.S. intervention.
- September 5 – Bradbury Robinson of St. Louis University throws the first legal forward pass in an American football game.
- September 22 – Atlanta race riot: Race riots in Atlanta, Georgia result in 27 people killed and the Black-owned business district severely damaged.
- September 24 – U.S. President Theodore Roosevelt proclaims Devils Tower, Wyoming as the nation's first National Monument.
- September 26 – The first concert of the Telharmonium, the first music synthesizer, is presented at Telharmonic Hall, Broadway at 39th St., New York City.
- September 30 – The first Gordon Bennett Cup in ballooning is held, starting in Paris. The winning team, piloting the balloon United States, lands in Fylingdales, Yorkshire, England, UK.

=== October–December ===
- October 1 – The Madeira School, a private boarding school for girls, opens with 28 students attending classes in two buildings on 19th Street, just off Dupont Circle in downtown Washington, D.C.
- October 11 – The San Francisco public school board sparks a United States diplomatic crisis with Japan, by ordering Japanese students to be taught in racially segregated schools.
- October 14 – The Chicago White Sox win their First World Series by defeating their crosstown rival Chicago Cubs 4 games to 2 at South Side Park (III)
- November 6 – B. B. Comer is elected the 33rd governor of Alabama defeating Asa E. Stratton.
- November 9 – U.S. President Theodore Roosevelt leaves for a trip to Panama to inspect the construction progress of the Panama Canal (the first time a sitting president of the United States makes an official trip outside of the United States).
- December 4 – Alpha Phi Alpha, the first inter-collegiate Greek-letter Fraternity established for African Americans, is founded at Cornell University.
- December 8 – The Petrified Forest, Arizona is designated a National Monument.
- December 10 – U.S. President Theodore Roosevelt is awarded the Nobel Peace Prize for his role in negotiating peace in the Russo-Japanese War (1905).

=== Undated ===
- The muffuletta sandwich is invented in New Orleans, Louisiana.

=== Ongoing ===
- Progressive Era (1890s–1920s)
- Lochner era (c. 1897–c. 1937)
- Black Patch Tobacco Wars (1904–1909)

== Births ==
=== January–February ===
- January 7
  - Red Allen, trumpet player (died 1967)
  - Bobbi Trout, pilot (died 2003)
- January 14 – William Bendix, actor (died 1964)
- January 20 – Bretaigne Windust, stage, film and television director (died 1960)
- January 22 – Robert E. Howard, pulp fiction writer (suicide 1936)
- February 4 – Clyde Tombaugh, astronomer (died 1997)
- February 10
  - Lon Chaney Jr., actor (died 1973)
  - Erik Rhodes, actor (died 1990)
- February 17
  - Mary Brian, actress (died 2002)
  - Elizabeth M. Ramsey, research physician (died 1993)
- February 20 – John Kenley, theatrical producer (died 2009)
- February 28 – Bugsy Siegel, gangster (killed 1947)

=== March–April ===
- March 4 – Charles Rudolph Walgreen Jr., businessman (died 2007)
- March 6 – Lou Costello, actor and comedian, half of Abbott & Costello team (died 1959)
- March 19 – Roy Roberts, actor (died 1975)
- March 20 – Ozzie Nelson, actor and band leader (died 1975)
- March 26 – H. Radclyffe Roberts, entomologist and museum administrator (died 1982)
- April 4 – John Cameron Swayze, journalist (died 1995)
- April 14 – Broda Otto Barnes, medical researcher (died 1988)
- April 22 – Eddie Albert, actor (died 2005)
- April 24 – William Joyce, fascist propagandist (executed 1946 in the United Kingdom)
- April 25 – William J. Brennan, Supreme Court Justice (died 1997)

=== May–June ===
- May 3 – Mary Astor, actress and writer (died 1987)
- May 7 – Jon Lormer, actor (died 1986)
- May 11
  - Jacqueline Cochran, aviator (died 1980)
  - Richard Arvin Overton, American war veteran (WWII) (died 2018)
  - Ethel Weed, promoter of women's rights in Japan (died 1975)
- May 12 – Maurice Ewing, geophysicist and oceanographer (died 1974)
- May 17 – Jack Carr, actor and animator (died 1967)
- May 19 – Bruce Bennett, athlete and actor (died 2007)
- May 23 – Allan Scott, screenwriter (died 1995)
- May 28 – Phil Regan, actor (died 1996)
- June 3 – Josephine Baker, actress (died 1975 in France)
- June 19 – Earl W. Bascom, rodeo pioneer, artist, inventor (died 1995)
- June 22
  - George W. Clarke, Washington State politician (died 2006)
  - Anne Morrow Lindbergh, author and aviator (died 2001)
- June 26 – Viktor Schreckengost, industrial designer (died 2008)

=== July–August ===
- July 1 – Estée Lauder, cosmetics entrepreneur (died 2004)
- July 7 – Satchel Paige, baseball player (died 1982)
- July 10 – Ad Liska, baseball pitcher (died 1998)
- July 16
  - Vincent Sherman, movie director and actor (died 2006)
  - James Still, poet, novelist and folklorist (died 2001)
- July 18
  - Sidney Darlington, engineer (died 1997)
  - S. I. Hayakawa, Canadian-born American academic and politician, U.S. Senator from California from 1977 to 1983 (died 1992)*
  - Speed Webb, jazz drummer and territory band leader (died 1994)
- August 6 – Vic Dickenson, trombonist (died 1984)
- August 9 – Robert L. Surtees, cinematographer (died 1985)
- August 12 – Tedd Pierce, animator (died 1972)
- August 17 – Hazel Bishop, chemist and inventor of "no-smear" lipstick (died 1998)
- August 19 – Philo Farnsworth, American inventor and television pioneer (died 1971)
- August 27 – Ed Gein, serial killer (died 1984)

=== September–October ===
- September 2 – Barbara Jo Allen, actress (died 1974)
- September 5
  - Shimon Agranat, American-born president of the Supreme Court of Israel (died 1992)
  - Sunnyland Slim, blues pianist (died 1995)
- September 12 – Lee Erwin, television writer (died 1972)
- September 17
  - Raymond D. Mindlin, mechanician (died 1987)
  - Edgar Wayburn, environmentalist (died 2010)
- September 21 – Henry Beachell, plant breeder (died 2006)
- September 27 – Alma Vessells John, nurse, broadcast personality and civil rights activist (died 1986)
- October 6 – Janet Gaynor, actress (died 1984)
- October 7 – James E. Webb, government administrator (died 1992)
- October 10 – Paul Creston, composer (died 1985)
- October 15
  - Hiram Fong, businessman and U.S. Senator from Hawaii from 1959 to 1977 (died 2004)
  - Alicia Patterson, newspaper editor (died 1963)
- October 23 – Gertrude Ederle, swimmer (died 2003)
- October 27 – Earle Cabell, politician (died 1975)
- October 29 – Fredric Brown, writer (died 1972)

=== November–December ===
- November 1 – Johnny Indrisano, boxer and actor (died 1968)
- November 4 – Willie Love, Delta blues pianist (died 1953)
- November 5 – Fred Lawrence Whipple, astronomer (died 2004)
- November 14 – Louise Brooks, actress (died 1985)
- November 15 – Curtis LeMay, U.S.A.F. general, vice-presidential candidate (died 1990)
- November 17 – Betty Bronson, actress (died 1979)
- November 18 – George Wald, scientist, Nobel Prize laureate (died 1997)
- November 24 – Don MacLaughlin, actor (died 1986)
- December 2 – Donald Woods, Canadian-born American actor (died 1998)
- December 9 – Grace Hopper, computer scientist and naval officer (died 1992)
- December 11 – Herman Welker, U.S. Senator from Idaho from 1951 to 1957 (died 1957)
- December 27 – Oscar Levant, pianist, composer, author, comedian and actor (died 1972)

== Deaths ==
- January 25
  - John S. Harris, United States Senator from Louisiana from 1868 till 1871 (born 1825)
  - Joseph Wheeler, U.S. Army general and politician (born 1836)
- February 9 – Paul Laurence Dunbar, poet and publisher (born 1872)
- February 18 – John B. Stetson, hat manufacturer and inventor of the cowboy hat (born 1830)
- February 27 – Samuel Pierpont Langley, astronomer, physicist and aeronautics pioneer (born 1834)
- March 4 – John Schofield, 28th United States Secretary of War and Commanding General of the United States Army (born 1831)
- March 13 – Susan B. Anthony, civil rights and women's suffrage activist (born 1820)
- April 11
  - James Anthony Bailey, circus ringmaster (born 1847)
  - Francis Pharcellus Church, editor and publisher (born 1839)
- April 24 – Mary Hunt, temperance activist (born 1830)
- April 25 – John Knowles Paine, composer (born 1839)
- May 12 – Gabriel C. Wharton, civil engineer and Confederate general (born 1824)
- May 14 – Carl Schurz, German-born statesman (born 1829)
- May 15 – John K. Bucklyn, Medal of Honor recipient (born 1834)
- June 17 – Harry Nelson Pillsbury, chess champion (born 1872)
- June 25 – Stanford White, architect (born 1853)
- September 20 – Robert R. Hitt, 13th Assistant Secretary of State (born 1834)
- September 21 – Samuel Arnold, conspirator involved in the plot to kidnap U.S. President Abraham Lincoln in 1865 (born 1834)
- October 1 – Eva Clark, circus performer who was shot by her husband a month prior
- October 6 – Buck Ewing, American baseball player New York Giants and MLB Hall of Famer (born 1859)
- October 9 – Joseph Glidden, inventor of barbed wire (born 1813)
- October 16 – Varina Davis, wife of Jefferson Davis, First Lady of the Confederate States of America (born 1826)
- October 17 – James D. Walker, United States Senator from Arkansas from 1879 till 1885 (born 1830)
- November 4 – John H. Ketcham, politician (born 1832)
- November 23 – Willard Warner, United States Senator from Alabama from 1868 till 1871 (born 1826)
- December 12 – Arthur Brown, United States Senator from Utah from 1896 till 1897 (born 1843)
- December 22 – Richard S. Rust, abolitionist (born 1815)
- December 30 – Thomas M. Bowen, United States Senator from Colorado from 1883 till 1889 (born 1835)
- December 31 – Donelson Caffery, United States Senator from Louisiana from 1892 till 1901 (born 1835)

== See also ==
- List of American films of 1906
- Timeline of United States history (1900–1929)
