= 1835 in the United States =

- Decades: 1810s; 1820s; 1830s; 1840s; 1850s
- See also: History of the United States (1789–1849); Timeline of United States history (1820–1859); List of years in the United States

Events from the year 1835 in the United States.

== Incumbents ==
=== Federal government ===
- President: Andrew Jackson (D-Tennessee)
- Vice President: Martin Van Buren (D-New York)
- Chief Justice: John Marshall (Virginia)
- Speaker of the House of Representatives:

John Bell (W-Tennessee) (until March 4)
James K. Polk (D-Tennessee) (starting December 7)

- Congress: 23rd (until March 4), 24th (starting March 4)

==== State governments ====
Governors and lieutenant governors

=== Governors ===
- Governor of Alabama: John Gayle (Democratic) (until November 21), Clement Comer Clay (Democratic) (starting November 21)
- Governor of Connecticut: Samuel A. Foot (Whig) (until May 6), Henry W. Edwards (Democratic) (starting May 6)
- Governor of Delaware: Caleb P. Bennett (Democratic)
- Governor of Georgia: Wilson Lumpkin (Democratic) (until November 4), William Schley (Democratic) (starting November 4)
- Governor of Illinois: Joseph Duncan (Whig)
- Governor of Indiana: Noah Noble (Whig)
- Governor of Kentucky: James T. Morehead (National Republican)
- Governor of Louisiana: André B. Roman (Whig) (until February 4), Edward Douglass White Sr. (Whig) (starting February 4)
- Governor of Maine: Robert P. Dunlap (Democratic)
- Governor of Maryland: James Thomas (Whig)
- Governor of Massachusetts: John Davis (Whig) (until March 1), Samuel Turell Armstrong (Whig) (starting March 1)
- Governor of Mississippi: Hiram Runnels (Democratic) (until November 20), John A. Quitman (Whig) (starting November 20)
- Governor of Missouri: Daniel Dunklin (Democratic)
- Governor of New Hampshire: William Badger (Democratic)
- Governor of New Jersey: Peter Dumont Vroom (Democratic)
- Governor of New York: William L. Marcy (Democratic)
- Governor of North Carolina: David Lowry Swain (National Republican) (until December 10), Richard Dobbs Spaight Jr. (Democratic) (starting December 10)
- Governor of Ohio: Robert Lucas (Democratic)
- Governor of Pennsylvania: George Wolf (Democratic-Republican) (until December 15), Joseph Ritner (Anti-Masonic) (starting December 15)
- Governor of Rhode Island: John Brown Francis (Democratic)
- Governor of South Carolina: George McDuffie (Democratic)
- Governor of Tennessee: William Carroll (Democratic) (until October 12), Newton Cannon (Whig) (starting October 12)
- Governor of Vermont: William A. Palmer (Anti-Masonic Party) (until November 2), Silas H. Jennison (Whig) (starting November 2)
- Governor of Virginia: Littleton Waller Tazewell (Whig)

=== Lieutenant governors ===
- Lieutenant Governor of Connecticut: Thaddeus Betts (Whig) (until May 6), Ebenezer Stoddard (Democratic-Republican) (starting May 6)
- Lieutenant Governor of Illinois: Alexander M. Jenkins (Democratic)
- Lieutenant Governor of Indiana: David Wallace (Whig)
- Lieutenant Governor of Kentucky: vacant
- Lieutenant Governor of Massachusetts: Samuel T. Armstrong (political party unknown)
- Lieutenant Governor of Missouri: Lilburn Boggs (Democratic)
- Lieutenant Governor of New York: John Tracy (Democratic)
- Lieutenant Governor of Rhode Island: Jeffrey Hazard (political party unknown) (until month and day unknown), George Engs (political party unknown) (starting month and day unknown)
- Lieutenant Governor of South Carolina: Whitemarsh B. Seabrook (Democratic)
- Lieutenant Governor of Vermont: Lebbeus Egerton (Anti-Masonic) (until November 2), Silas H. Jennison (Whig) (starting November 2)

== Events ==
- January 8 – The Federal Government declares that Andrew Jackson paid off the national debt for the first and only time.

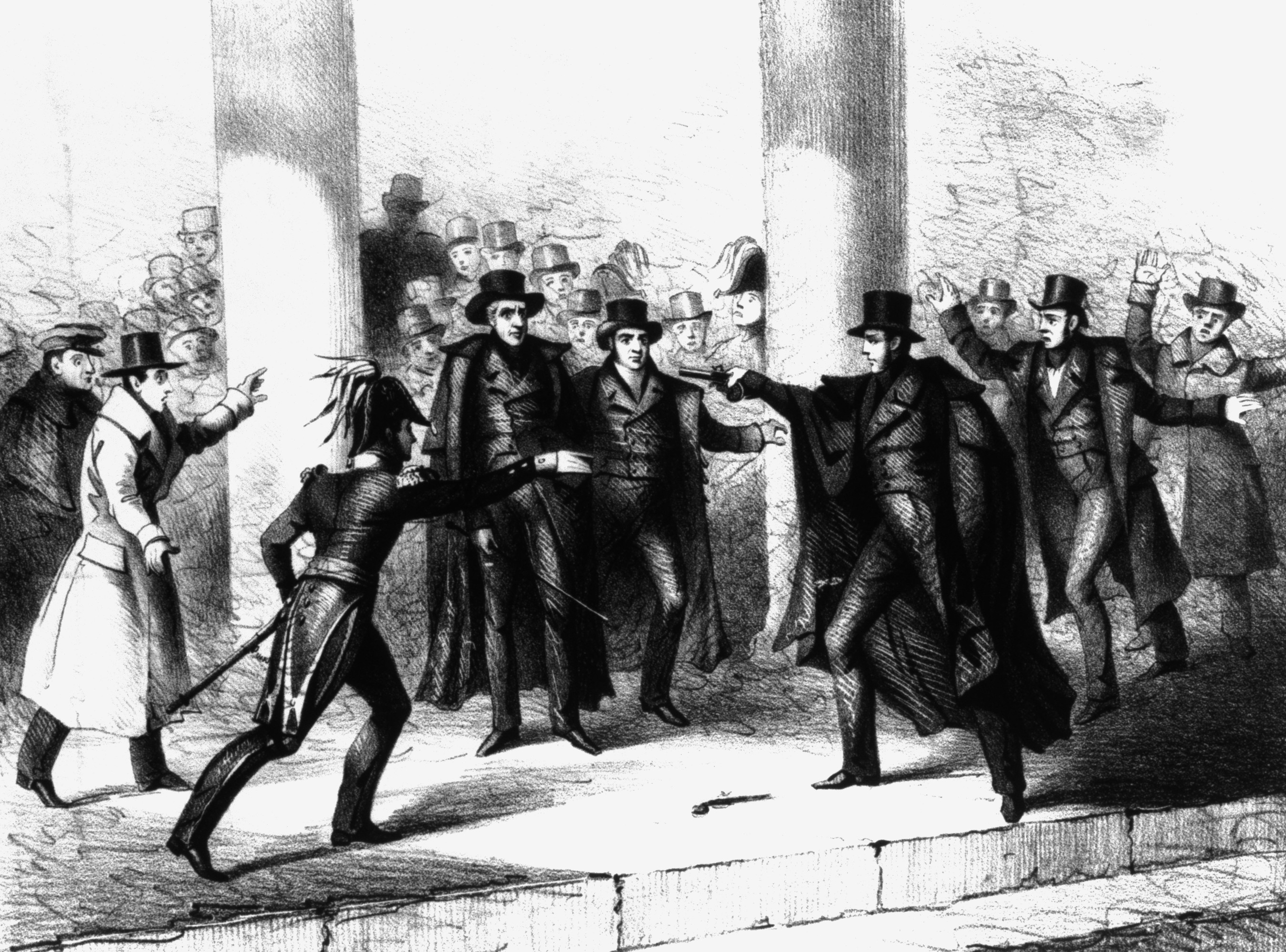
January 30: First assassination attempt against a U.S. president.

- January 30 – Richard Lawrence unsuccessfully tries to assassinate President Andrew Jackson in the United States Capitol; this is the first assassination attempt against a president of the United States.
- March 31 – Hostile action opens the Toledo War between the State of Ohio and the Michigan Territory over the city of Toledo and the Toledo Strip.
- May 6 – James Gordon Bennett, Sr. publishes the first issue of the New York Herald.
- August – P. T. Barnum begins his career as a showman in New York City by displaying Joice Heth, a black woman who he claimed was 161 years old and the former nursemaid of George Washington.
- July 4 – The Baltimore and Ohio Railroad completed construction of its Thomas Viaduct then the longest bridge in the United States, and second only to London Bridge in the world; the longer Canton Viaduct is completed two weeks later.
- August 25 – The Great Moon Hoax begins.

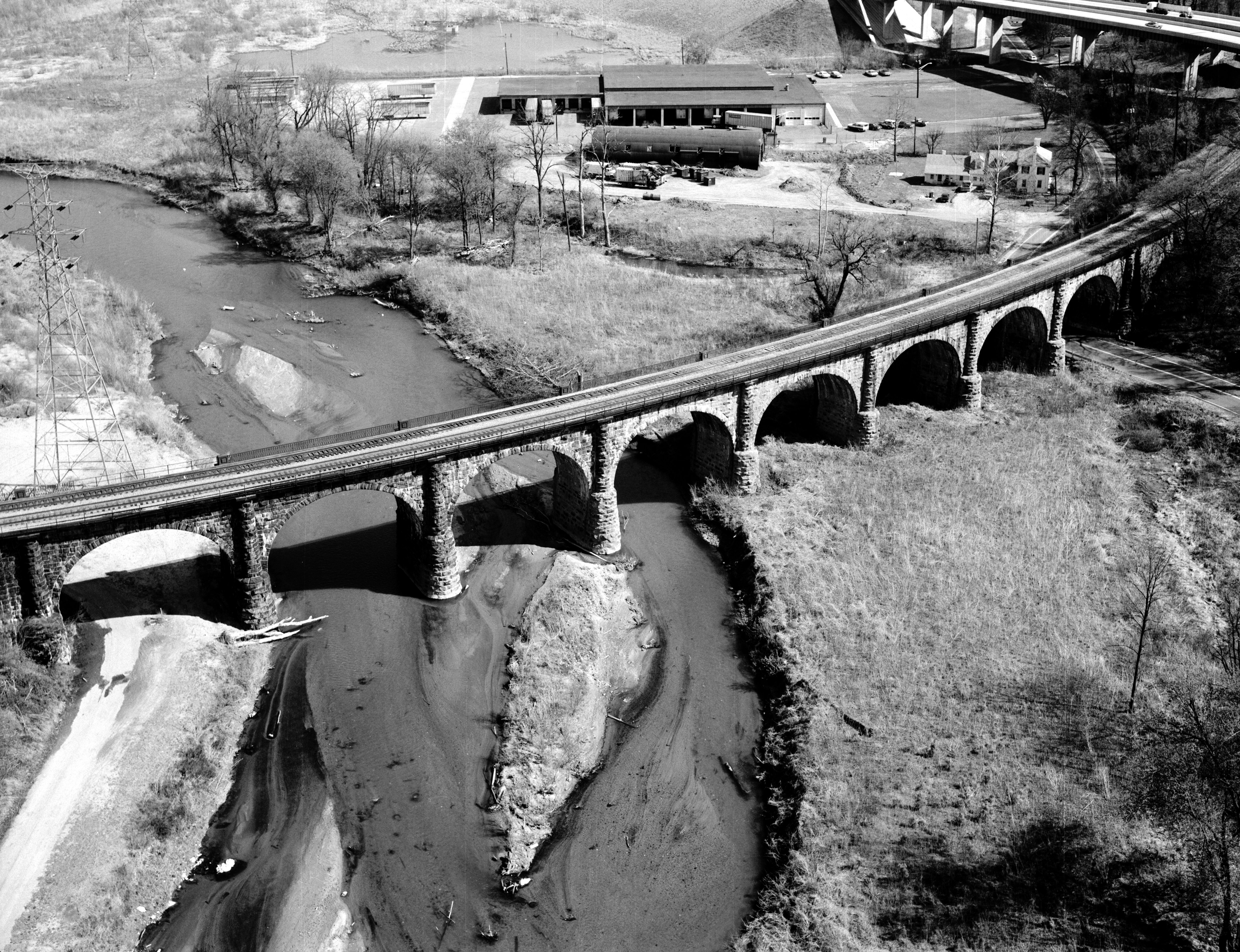
July 4: Thomas Viaduct completed.

- October 2 – Texas Revolution – Battle of Gonzales: Mexican soldiers attempt to disarm the people of Gonzales, Texas but encounter stiff resistance from a hastily assembled militia.
- December 9 – The Army of the Republic of Texas captures San Antonio.

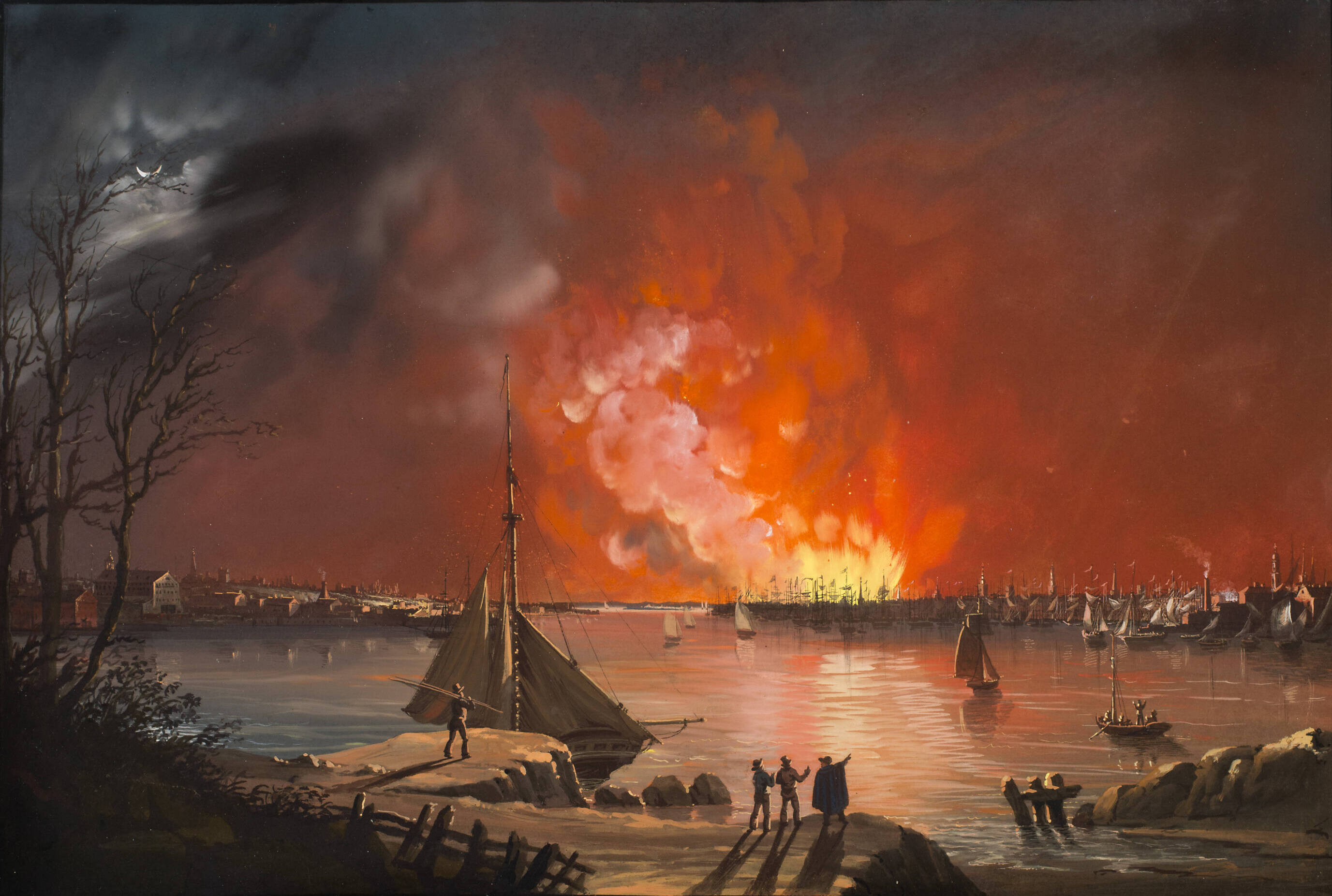
December 16–17: Great Fire of New York

- December 16–17 – The Great Fire of New York destroys 530–700 buildings and kills two.
- December 19 – Toledo Blade newspaper begins publishing.
- December 20 – The Texas Declaration of Independence is first signed at Goliad, Texas.
- December 28 – The Second Seminole War breaks out. Seminole fighter Osceola and his warriors attack government agent Thompson outside Fort King in central Florida.
- December 29 – The Treaty of New Echota, ceding all the lands of the Cherokee east of the Mississippi to the United States, is signed.

=== Undated ===
- Judge William Harper of South Carolina rules that a person's acceptance as white, not the proportion of white and black blood, determine a person's race.
- Fort Cass is established, the military headquarters and site of the largest internment camps during the 1838 Trail of Tears.
- Tensions between the United States and France reach an all-time high as President Andrew Jackson and the French government of Louis Philippe I trade threats and insults over France's refusal to pay the United States reparations which the United States government insists France owes from the Quasi-War.

=== Ongoing ===
- Second Seminole War (1835–1842)

== Births ==
- January 29 – Sarah Chauncey Woolsey (Susan Coolidge), children's writer (died 1905)
- February 18 – Kate J. Brainard, musical educator (died 1918)
- February 19 – Henry R. Pease, U.S. Senator from Mississippi from 1874 to 1875 (died 1907)
- March 28 – Matthias N. Forney, steam locomotive manufacturer (died 1908)
- March 31 – John La Farge, painter and stained-glass artist (died 1910)
- April 2 – Jacob Nash Victor, railroad builder (died 1907)
- April 10 – Henry Villard, journalist, railroad financier and philanthropist (died 1900)
- April 17 –
  - Augusta Cooper Bristol, poet (died 1910)
  - Zenas Bliss, Union Army general and Medal of Honor recipient (died 1900)
- May 12 – John T. Lesley, Mayor of Tampa (died 1913)
- May 27 – Charles Francis Adams Jr., public figure and historian (died 1915)
- June 10 – Rebecca Latimer Felton, U.S. Senator from Georgia in 1922 (died 1930)
- June 15 – Adah Isaacs Menken, actress, painter and poet (died 1868)
- June 26 – Thomas W. Knox, war reporter (died 1896)
- June 27 – Fred Harvey, entrepreneur (died 1901)
- June 29 – Celia Thaxter, poet (died 1894)
- August 2 – Elisha Gray, inventor and businessman (died 1901)
- September 4 – William Lindsay, U.S. Senator from Kentucky from 1893 to 1901 (died 1909)
- September 10 – Donelson Caffery, U.S. Senator from Louisiana from 1892 to 1901 (died 1906)
- September 14 – Ellen Hamlin, Second Lady of the United States as wife of Hannibal Hamlin (died 1925)
- October 16 – William R. Shafter, general (died 1906)
- October 23 – Adlai Stevenson I, 23rd vice president of the United States from 1893 to 1897 (died 1914)
- October 26 – Thomas M. Bowen, U.S. Senator from Colorado from 1883 to 1889 (died 1906)
- October 31 – Adelbert Ames, 27th and 30th governor of Mississippi from 1868 to 1870 and from 1874 to 1876 and U.S. Senator from Mississippi from 1870 to 1874, Medal of Honor recipient (died 1933)
- November 17 – Andrew L. Harris, Civil War hero and Governor of Ohio (died 1915)
- November 21 – Rose Eytinge, actress (died 1911)
- November 25
  - Andrew Carnegie, industrialist and philanthropist (died 1919)
  - Arthur Sewall, politician and industrialist (died 1900)
- November 30 – Mark Twain, writer, humorist, entrepreneur, publisher and lecturer (died 1910)
- December 13 – Phillips Brooks, clergyman and poet (died 1893)
- December 17 – Alexander Emanuel Agassiz, scientist (died 1910)
- December 18 – Lyman Abbott, clergyman and author (died 1922)

== Deaths ==
- February 19 – Amzi Chapin, singer, composer and music teacher (born 1768)
- March 15 – Samuel Dinsmoor, teacher, lawyer, banker and politician (born 1766)
- April 21 – Samuel Slater, "father of the American Industrial Revolution" (born 1768 in Great Britain)
- July 6 – John Marshall, fourth Chief Justice of the Supreme Court of the United States from 1801 to 1835 (born 1755)
- August 25 – Ann Rutledge, Abraham Lincoln's alleged first love (born 1813)
- August 30 – William T. Barry, U.S. Senator from Kentucky from 1814 to 1816 and U.S. Postmaster General from 1829 to 1835, died in Liverpool, England, United Kingdom (born 1784)
- September 15 – Sarah Knox Taylor, daughter of Zachary Taylor and wife of Jefferson Davis (born 1814)
- November 14 – James Freeman, first American clergyman to call himself a Unitarian (born 1759)
- December 12 – Elias Kane, U.S. Senator from Illinois from 1825 to 1835 (born 1794)
- December 22 – David Hosack physician and educator, attending doctor at the Hamilton-Burr duel (born 1769)
- Full date unknown
  - Sally Hemings, slave and concubine to Thomas Jefferson (born c. 1773)
  - Elkanah Tisdale, engraver, miniature painter and cartoonist (born 1768)

== See also ==
- Timeline of United States history (1820–1859)
- Timeline of the Andrew Jackson presidency § 1835
