= Alexander Jenkins =

Alexander Jenkins may refer to:

- J. Alexander (model) (born 1958), American reality television personality and model
- Alexander M. Jenkins (1802–1864), American politician
