= 1910 in the United States =

- Decades: 1890s; 1900s; 1910s; 1920s; 1930s
- See also: History of the United States (1865–1918); Timeline of United States history (1900–1929); List of years in the United States

Events from the year 1910 in the United States.

== Incumbents ==
=== Federal government ===
- President: William Howard Taft (R-Ohio)
- Vice President: James S. Sherman (R-New York)
- Chief Justice:

Melville Fuller (Illinois) (until July 4)
Edward Douglass White (Louisiana) (starting December 19)

- Speaker of the House of Representatives: Joseph Gurney Cannon (R-Illinois)
- Congress: 61st

==== State governments ====
Governors and lieutenant governors

=== Governors ===
- Governor of Alabama: B. B. Comer (Democratic)
- Governor of Arkansas: George Washington Donaghey (Democratic)
- Governor of California: James Gillett (Republican)
- Governor of Colorado: John F. Shafroth (Democratic)
- Governor of Connecticut: Frank B. Weeks (Republican)
- Governor of Delaware: Simeon S. Pennewill (Republican)
- Governor of Florida: Albert W. Gilchrist (Democratic)
- Governor of Georgia: Joseph M. Brown (Democratic)
- Governor of Idaho: James H. Brady (Republican)
- Governor of Illinois: Charles S. Deneen (Republican)
- Governor of Indiana: Thomas R. Marshall (Democratic)
- Governor of Iowa: Beryl F. Carroll (Republican)
- Governor of Kansas: Walter R. Stubbs (Republican)
- Governor of Kentucky: Augustus E. Willson (Republican)
- Governor of Louisiana: Jared Young Sanders, Sr. (Democratic)
- Governor of Maine: Bert M. Fernald (Republican)
- Governor of Maryland: Austin Lane Crothers (Democratic)
- Governor of Massachusetts: Eben Sumner Draper (Republican)
- Governor of Michigan: Fred M. Warner (Republican)
- Governor of Minnesota: Adolph O. Eberhart (Republican)
- Governor of Mississippi: Edmond Noel (Democratic)
- Governor of Missouri: Herbert S. Hadley (Republican)
- Governor of Montana: Edwin L. Norris (Democratic)
- Governor of Nebraska: Ashton C. Shallenberger (Democratic)
- Governor of Nevada: Denver S. Dickerson (Silver)
- Governor of New Hampshire: Henry B. Quinby (Republican)
- Governor of New Jersey: John Franklin Fort (Republican)
- Governor of New York:
  - until October 6: Charles Evans Hughes (Republican)
  - October 6 – end of December 31: Horace White (Republican)
- Governor of North Carolina: William Walton Kitchin (Democratic)
- Governor of North Dakota: John Burke (Democratic)
- Governor of Ohio: Judson Harmon (Democratic)
- Governor of Oklahoma: Charles N. Haskell (Democratic)
- Governor of Oregon: Frank W. Benson (Republican) (until June 17), Jay Bowerman (Republican) (starting June 17)
- Governor of Pennsylvania: Edwin Sydney Stuart (Republican)
- Governor of Rhode Island: Aram J. Pothier (Republican)
- Governor of South Carolina: Martin Frederick Ansel (Democratic)
- Governor of South Dakota: Robert S. Vessey (Republican)
- Governor of Tennessee: Malcolm R. Patterson (Democratic)
- Governor of Texas: Thomas Mitchell Campbell (Democratic)
- Governor of Utah: William Spry (Republican)
- Governor of Vermont: George H. Prouty (Republican) (until October 5), John A. Mead (Republican) (starting October 5)
- Governor of Virginia: Claude A. Swanson (Democratic) (until February 10), William Hodges Mann (Democratic) (starting February 10)
- Governor of Washington: Marion E. Hay (Republican)
- Governor of West Virginia: William E. Glasscock (Republican)
- Governor of Wisconsin: James O. Davidson (Republican)
- Governor of Wyoming: Bryant B. Brooks (Republican)

=== Lieutenant governors ===
- Lieutenant Governor of Alabama: Henry B. Gray (Democratic)
- Lieutenant Governor of California: Warren R. Porter (Republican)
- Lieutenant Governor of Colorado: Stephen R. Fitzgarrald (Democratic)
- Lieutenant Governor of Connecticut: vacant
- Lieutenant Governor of Delaware: John M. Mendinhall (Republican)
- Lieutenant Governor of Idaho: Lewis H. Sweetser (Republican)
- Lieutenant Governor of Illinois: John G. Oglesby (Republican)
- Lieutenant Governor of Indiana: Frank J. Hall (Democratic)
- Lieutenant Governor of Iowa: George W. Clarke (Republican)
- Lieutenant Governor of Kansas: William J. Fitzgerald (Republican)
- Lieutenant Governor of Kentucky: William Hopkinson Cox (Republican)
- Lieutenant Governor of Louisiana: Paul M. Lambremont (Democratic)
- Lieutenant Governor of Massachusetts: Louis A. Frothingham (Republican)
- Lieutenant Governor of Michigan: Patrick H. Kelley (Republican)
- Lieutenant Governor of Minnesota: Edward Everett Smith (Republican)
- Lieutenant Governor of Mississippi: Luther Manship (Democratic)
- Lieutenant Governor of Missouri: Jacob Friedrich Gmelich (Republican)
- Lieutenant Governor of Montana: William R. Allen (Republican)
- Lieutenant Governor of Nebraska: Melville R. Hopewell (Republican)
- Lieutenant Governor of Nevada: vacant
- Lieutenant Governor of New York:
  - until October 6: Horace White (Republican)
  - October 6 – end of December 31: George H. Cobb (Republican)
- Lieutenant Governor of North Carolina: William C. Newland (Democratic)
- Lieutenant Governor of North Dakota: Robert S. Lewis (Republican)
- Lieutenant Governor of Ohio: Francis W. Treadway (Republican)
- Lieutenant Governor of Oklahoma: George W. Bellamy (Democratic)
- Lieutenant Governor of Pennsylvania: Robert S. Murphy (Republican)
- Lieutenant Governor of Rhode Island: Arthur W. Dennis (Republican) (until month and day unknown), Zenas Work Bliss (Republican) (starting month and day unknown)
- Lieutenant Governor of South Carolina: Thomas Gordon McLeod (Democratic)
- Lieutenant Governor of South Dakota: Howard C. Shober (Republican)
- Lieutenant Governor of Tennessee: William Kinney (Democratic)
- Lieutenant Governor of Texas: Asbury Bascom Davidson (Democratic)
- Lieutenant Governor of Vermont: John A. Mead (Republican) (until October 5), Leighton P. Slack (Republican) (starting October 5)
- Lieutenant Governor of Virginia: James Taylor Ellyson (Democratic)
- Lieutenant Governor of Washington: vacant
- Lieutenant Governor of Wisconsin: John Strange (Republican)

== Events ==
=== January–March ===
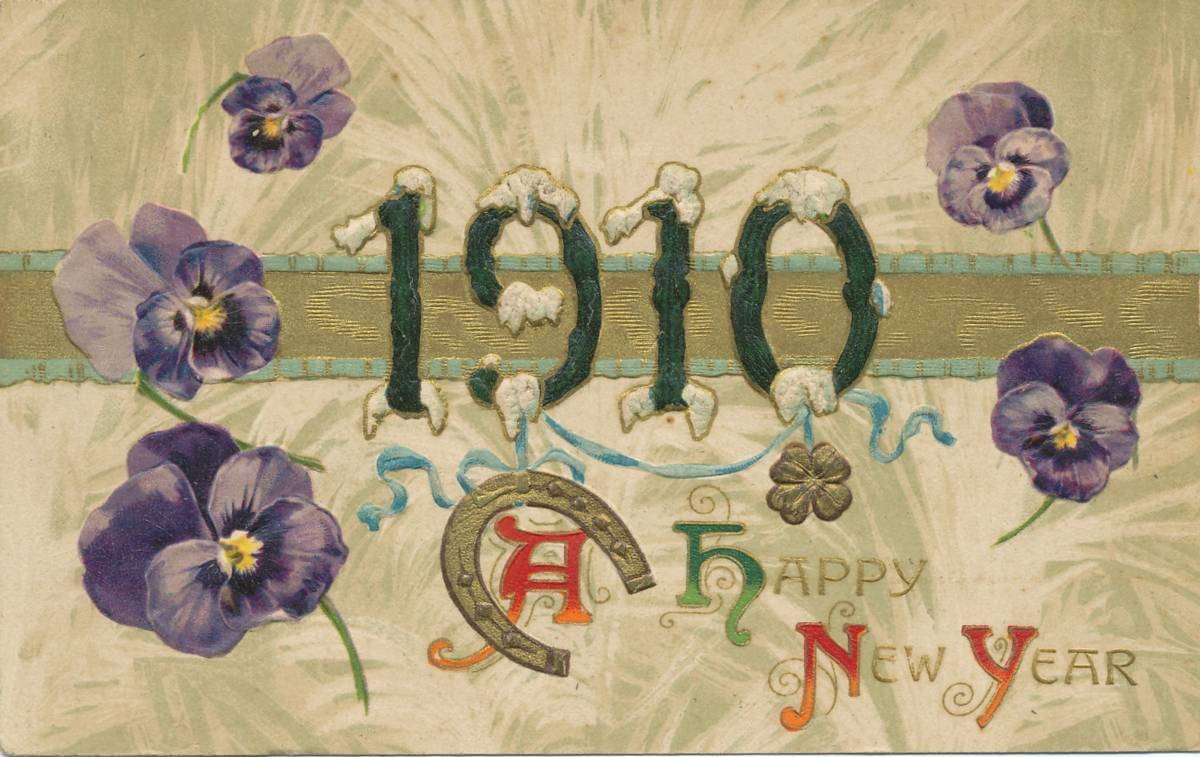
New Year's Day card

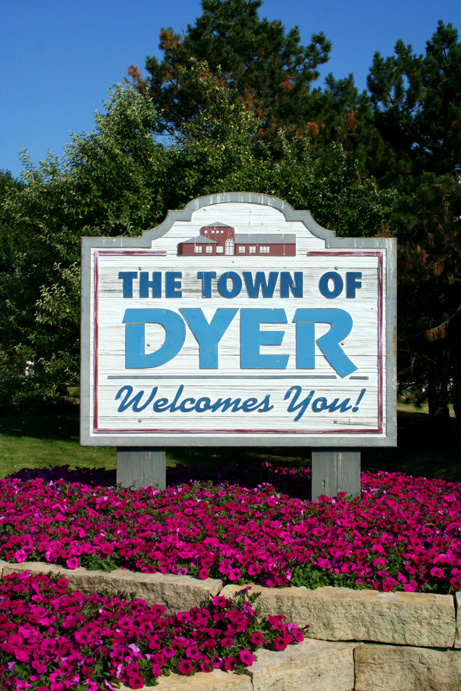
January 24: The town of Dyer, Indiana is incorporated.

- January 10–20 – The 1910 Los Angeles International Air Meet at Dominguez Field is held near Los Angeles, California (the first aviation meet to be held in the United States).
- January 10 – Joyce Hall founds Hallmark Cards.
- January 24 – Dyer, Indiana is incorporated.
- February 8 – The Boy Scouts of America youth organization is incorporated by William D. Boyce.
- February 13 – The strike, begun on November 23, 1909, by 20,000 women against New York City's shirtwaist (blouse) factories ends after 339 manufacturers agree to a reduced workweek (52 hours a week rather than 56), increased wages and labor union recognition.
- February 16–18 – The state of Ohio is crippled by a snowstorm.
- March 3 – Rockefeller Foundation: John D. Rockefeller Jr. announces his retirement from managing his businesses so that he can devote all his time to philanthropy.
- March 9 – The 17-month-long Westmoreland County coal strike of 1910–11, which at its peak will involve 15,000 coal miners represented by the United Mine Workers across 65 mines, begins in Westmoreland County, Pennsylvania.
- March 10 – Release of In Old California, the first film made in Hollywood, California, directed by D. W. Griffith.
- March 12 – actress Florence Lawrence becomes "the first true movie star" after being named in advertisements, having previously been billed only as "The Biograph Girl".
- March 14 – The Lakeview Gusher is vented into the atmosphere.
- March 19 – Republicans reduce the powers of the Speaker of the House of Representatives to influence committee membership.
- March 22 – President of the United States William H. Taft gives an American endorsement in favor of creating a "World Court" for the resolution of disputes between nations.
- March 30 – The Mississippi Legislature founds The University of Southern Mississippi.

=== April–June ===
- April 6 – Wildwood Crest, New Jersey is incorporated as a borough of Cape May County, New Jersey.
- May 11 – The U.S. Congress establishes Glacier National Park in Montana.
- May 12 – The second National Association for the Advancement of Colored People meeting is held in New York City.
- May 16 – The U.S. Congress authorizes the creation of the United States Bureau of Mines.
- June 18 – To much fanfare, former president Theodore Roosevelt returns to New York City from a year-long African safari and tour of Europe.
- June 19 – The first unofficial Father's Day is observed.
- June 25
  - The Mann Act, known popularly as the "White Slave Traffic Act", is passed by the U.S. Congress, prohibiting the transportation of women across state lines for "immoral purposes".
  - The U.S. Parole Commission is created, making it possible for the first time for persons convicted of a federal crime to be paroled before the end of their sentences. Prior to this, a federal prisoner could only secure an early release by commutation or pardon by the president of the U.S.
  - The United States Postal Savings System is created by law, adapting, for the U.S. a system that had been used in European nations for people to deposit up to $2,500 into an interest-bearing (2%) account at their local post office. The system will continue in some form until 1985.
  - The Pickett Act becomes law, giving the president of the U.S. authority to withdraw government-owned land from public use, as necessary, for government projects.
  - The "direct system" of public land surveying begins in the U.S., replacing the system of contracting with private surveyors.

=== July–September ===
- July 4 – African-American boxer Jack Johnson defeats white boxer James J. Jeffries in a heavyweight boxing match in Reno, Nevada, sparking race riots across the United States.
- July 22 – A Wireless telegraph sent from the S.S. Montrose results in the identification and later arrest and execution of murderer Dr. Hawley Crippen.
- July 24 – James MacGillivray publishes an account of Paul Bunyan in The Detroit News.
- August 20–21 – The Great Fire of 1910 wildfire burns about 3 million acres (12,000 km^{2}) in northeast Washington, northern Idaho, and western Montana over 2 days and kills 86 people (believed to be the largest fire in recorded United States history).

=== October–December ===
- October 1 – Los Angeles Times bombing: A bomb explodes at the Los Angeles Times building, leaving 21 dead and several injured; brothers James B. and John Joseph McNamara are later arrested and sentenced.
- October 10 – Tau Epsilon Phi fraternity is founded by ten Jewish men at Columbia University as a response to the existence of similar organizations which would not admit Jewish members.
- October 11 – Theodore Roosevelt becomes the first former president to ride in an airplane.
- October 18 – The lake freighter SS William C. Moreland runs aground on a reef near the Keweenaw Peninsula in Lake Superior, leading to its loss.
- October 23 – The Philadelphia Athletics defeat the Chicago Cubs, 7–2, to win the 1910 World Series in baseball in Game 5.
- November – John Lomax's pioneering collection Cowboy Songs and Other Frontier Ballads is published by Sturgis and Walton with an introduction by Theodore Roosevelt.
- November 4 – Antonio Rodríguez is burned at the stake near Rocksprings, Texas after being arrested a few days earlier for the murder of Mrs. Lem Henderson at her ranch. His murder incites race riots in both Texas and Mexico.
- November 7 – The first air flight for the purpose of delivering commercial freight is made between Dayton and Columbus, both in Ohio, by the Wright Brothers and department store owner Max Moorehouse. Philip Parmalee is the pilot.
- November 8 – 1910 United States elections: Democrats regain control of the House of Representatives; Republicans maintain control of the Senate.
- November 17 – Ralph Johnstone, a pilot for the Wright Exhibition Team, dies at Denver, Colorado after his machine breaks apart in mid-air in full view of about 5,000 spectators. Johnstone becomes the first American pilot to die in the crash of an airplane in the United States.
- November 22 – U.S. Senator Aldrich and A. P. Andrews (Assistant Secretary of the Treasury Department), along with many of the country's leading financiers, who together represent about 1/6 of the world's wealth, are witnessed leaving Hoboken, New Jersey, on a train together. They later arrive at the Jekyll Island Club to discuss monetary policy and the banking system, an event which some say is the impetus for the creation of the Federal Reserve
- November 26 – Following the Japanese annexation of Korea in August, Japanese journalist Kioshi Kawakami publishes a propaganda article in this month's edition of World Today attempting to justify Japanese colonization of Korea.
- December 12 – New York City socialite Dorothy Arnold disappears. Her family does not notify the police until 6 weeks later, after their own investigations fail to produce any results.
- December 19 – Edward Douglass White is sworn in as the 9th Chief Justice of the United States.
- December 31 – Two of America's premier pioneer aviators are killed on this day: John Moisant in New Orleans and Wright pilot Arch Hoxsey in Los Angeles.

=== Undated ===
- US census shows that 20.9% of the population classed as "Negro" are of mixed race.
- Henry Ford sells 10,000 cars.
- World Peace Foundation established.

=== Ongoing ===
- Progressive Era (1890s–1920s)
- Lochner era (c. 1897–c. 1937)

== Births ==
=== January–February ===
- January 6 – Wright Morris, photographer and writer (died 1998)
- January 7 – Orval Faubus, governor of Arkansas (died 1994)
- January 16 – Dizzy Dean, baseball player (died 1974)
- January 21 – Albert Rosellini, politician (died 2011)
- January 28 – Arnold Moss, actor (died 1989)
- February 2 – David Sharpe, actor and stunt performer (died 1980)
- February 3 – Robert Earl Jones, actor (died 2006)
- February 17 – Arthur Hunnicutt, actor (died 1979)
- February 19 – Dorothy Janis, actress (died 2010)
- February 22 – Vaughn Taylor, actor (died 1983)
- February 27 – Joan Bennett, actress (died 1990)

=== March–April ===
- March 3 – Kittens Reichert, silent movies child actor (died 1990)
- March 7 – Will Glickman, playwright (died 1983)
- March 9 – Samuel Barber, composer (died 1981)
- March 10 – Albert Facchiano, Italian-American criminal (died 2011)
- March 24 – Clyde Barrow, outlaw (died 1934)
- March 28 – Frederick Baldwin Adams, Jr., librarian (died 2001)
- April 1 – Harry Carney, jazz musician (died 1974)
- April 6 – Olin E. Teague, member of the United States House of Representatives from 1946 to 1978 (died 1981)
- April 9 – Abraham A. Ribicoff, United States Senator from Connecticut from 1963 till 1981. (died 1998)
- April 10 – Paul Sweezy, economist and editor (died 2004)
- April 15 – Eddie Mayo, baseball player (died 2006)
- April 16 – Berton Roueché, medical writer (died 1994)

=== May–June ===
- May 1 – Mary French Rockefeller, heiress, socialite and philanthropist (died 1997)
- May 3 – Norman Corwin, screenwriter (died 2011)
- May 6 – June Gittelson, actress (died 1993)
- May 12 – Charles B. Fulton, jurist (died 1996)
- May 22 – Johnny Olson, game show announcer (died 1985)
- May 23
  - Scatman Crothers, actor and musician (died 1986)
  - Artie Shaw, clarinetist and bandleader (died 2004)
- May 28 – T-Bone Walker, singer (died 1976)
- May 30 – Ralph Metcalfe, athlete (died 1978)
- June 2 – Annie Lee Cooper, civil rights activist (died 2010)
- June 3 – Paulette Goddard, actress (died 1990)
- June 8
  - C. C. Beck, illustrator (died 1989)
  - John W. Campbell, journalist and author (died 1971)
- June 10 – Ted Richmond, film producer (died 2013)
- June 14 – J. Harold Smith, pastor and evangelist (died 2001)
- June 17 – H. Owen Reed, composer (died 2014)
- June 18 – E. G. Marshall, actor (died 1998)
- June 19 – Paul Flory, chemist, Nobel laureate (died 1985)
- June 23
  - Peaches Browning, actress (died 1956)
  - Gordon B. Hinckley, fifteenth president of The Church of Jesus Christ of Latter-day Saints (died 2008)
- June 26
  - Margaret Dunning, philanthropist (died 2015)
  - Roy J. Plunkett, chemist, discovered Teflon (died 1994)

=== July–August ===
- July 4 – Gloria Stuart, actress (died 2010)
- July 11 – Sally Blane, actress (died 1997)
- July 12 – Samuel Hazard Gillespie Jr., counsel (died 2011)
- July 14 – William Hanna, animator (died 2001)
- July 15 – Ken Lynch, actor (died 1990)
- July 22
  - Gordon Blake, U.S. Air Force lieutenant general (died 1997)
  - Ruthie Tompson, animator (died 2021)
- July 30 – Edgar de Evia, photographer (died 2003)
- August 4
  - Anita Page, actress (died 2008)
  - William Schuman, composer (died 1992)
  - Hedda Sterne, Romanian-born painter and printmaker (died 2011)
- August 12 – Jane Wyatt, actress (died 2006)
- August 15 – Thomas Kuchel, United States Senator from California from 1953 till 1969. (died 1994)
- August 23 – Lonny Frey, baseball player (died 2009)
- August 25
  - George Cisar, baseball player (died 2010)
  - Dorothea Tanning, artist (died 2012)

=== September–October ===
- September 3 – Kitty Carlisle Hart, singer and actress (died 2007)
- September 5 – Ralph Berkowitz, composer, classical musician, and painter (died 2011)
- September 6 – Walter Giesler, soccer coach (died 1976)
- September 15 – Charles August Nichols, animator and film director (died 1992)
- September 18 – Joseph F. Enright, naval officer (died 2000)
- September 23 – Elliott Roosevelt, author and World War II hero (died 1990)
- September 24 – Ignatius J. Galantin, United States Navy admiral (died 2004)
- September 29 – Virginia Bruce, actress and singer (died 1982)
- October 1 – Bonnie Parker, outlaw (died 1934)
- October 7 – Henry Plumer McIlhenny, art collector, socialite and philanthropist (died 1986)
- October 8 – Gus Hall, communist leader (died 2000)
- October 10 – Julius Shulman, architectural photographer (died 2009)
- October 12
  - Bob Sheppard, baseball announcer (died 2010)
  - Robert Fitzgerald, poet and translator (died 1985)
- October 13 – Robert McKimson, animator and director (died 1977)
- October 14 – John Wooden, basketball coach (died 2010)
- October 20 – Bob Sheppard, sportscaster (died 2010)
- October 21 – William Vitarelli, educator and architect (died 2010)
- October 23 – Hayden Rorke, actor (died 1987)
- October 25 – Charles C. Stelle, diplomat (died 1964)

=== November–December ===
- November 9 – Carroll Quigley, historian, polymath, and theorist of the evolution of civilizations (died 1977)
- November 13 – William Bradford Huie, journalist, editor, publisher and author (died 1986)
- November 17 – Jean Potts, mystery novelist (died 1999)
- November 30 – Harry Bauler, politician (died 1962)
- December 11 – Mildred Cleghorn, chairwoman of the Fort Sill Apache tribe (died 1997)
- December 15 – John Hammond, record producer (died 1987)
- December 18 – Abe Burrows, playwright (died 1985)
- December 29 – Frank Abbandando, gangster (died 1942)
- December 30 – Paul Bowles, author (died 1999)

=== Full date unknown ===
- Hilda Conkling, child poet (died 1986)

== Deaths ==
=== January to June ===
- January 12 – Bass Reeves, one of the first black Deputy U.S. Marshals west of the Mississippi River (born 1838)
- January 25 – Lotta Faust, Broadway actress (born 1880)
- February 19 – Neil Burgess, comedian (born 1846)
- March 27 – Alexander Emanuel Agassiz, scientist (born 1835)
- March 28 – William Paul Roberts, Confederate brigadier general (born 1841)
- March 29 – Thomas L. Rosser, Confederate major general (born 1836)
- April 12 – William G. Sumner, social scientist, Yale professor (born 1840)
- April 21 – Mark Twain, writer, entrepreneur, publisher and lecturer (born 1835)
- May 3 – Howard T. Ricketts, pathologist (born 1871)
- May 31 – Elizabeth Blackwell, physician (born 1821)
- June 5 – O. Henry, novelist (born 1862)
- June 23 – John McGraw, 2nd governor of Washington (born 1850)
- June 28 – Samuel D. McEnery, U.S. Senator from Louisiana from 1897 to 1910 (born 1837)

=== July to September ===
- July 4 – Melville Fuller, Chief Justice (born 1833)
- July 31 – John G. Carlisle, U.S. Senator from Kentucky from 1890 to 1893 (born 1834)
- August 10 – Joe Gans, professional boxer, World Lightweight Champion from 1902 to 1908 (born 1874)
- August 24 – Wilkinson Call, U.S. Senator from Florida from 1879 to 1897 (born 1834)
- August 26 – William James, psychologist and philosopher (born 1842)
- September 5 – Julian Edwards, composer (born 1855)
- September 11 – Isaac L. Ellwood, businessman, rancher and inventor (born 1833)
- September 18 – Lelia P. Roby, philanthropist; founder, Ladies of the Grand Army of the Republic (born 1848)
- September 29 – Winslow Homer, painter (born 1836)

=== October to December ===
- October 3 –
  - Rufus Blodgett, U.S. Senator from New Jersey from 1887 to 1893 (born 1834)
  - Lucy Hobbs Taylor, dentist and teacher (born 1833)
- October 15 –
  - Byron Andrews, journalist, statesman, author and businessman (born 1852)
  - Stanley Ketchel, boxer (born 1886)
- October 17 –
  - Julia Ward Howe, abolitionist and poet (born 1819)
  - William Vaughn Moody, dramatist and poet (born 1869)
- October 20 – David B. Hill, 29th governor of New York (born 1843)
- November 17 – Ralph Johnstone, aviator (born 1886)
- November 18 – William A. B. Branch, politician (born 1847)
- November 23 – Hawley Harvey Crippen, murderer, executed in the United Kingdom (born 1862)
- December 3 – Mary Baker Eddy, Christian science founder (born 1821)
- December 31 – in separate aviation accidents
  - Archibald Hoxsey, aviator (born 1884)
  - John Moisant, aviator (born 1868)

== See also ==
- List of American films of 1910
- Timeline of United States history (1900–1929)
