= Ethel Weed =

American military officer

Ethel B. Weed
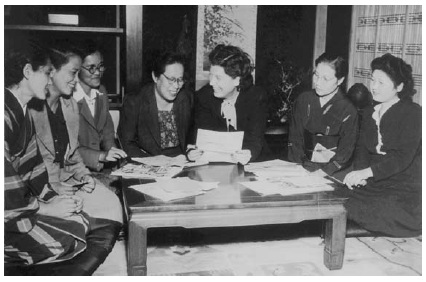
- A meeting of Lt. Weed and noted Japanese feminists including the President of the New Japan Women's League, Fujita Taki.
- Born: May 11, 1906; Syracuse, New York
- Died: June 6, 1975 (aged 69); Newton, Connecticut
- Military career
- Allegiance: United States of America
- Branch: United States Army
- Commands: Women's Army Corps
- Conflicts: World War II

Ethel Berenice Weed (May 11, 1906 – June 6, 1975) was an American military officer who advocated for the rights of Japanese women during the Allied occupation of Japan following World War II.

== Early life ==
Weed was born on May 11, 1906, in Syracuse, New York, to Grover Cleveland Weed and Berenice (Benjamin) Weed, both of British ancestry. Ethel was the oldest of four children, three daughters and one son. In 1919 Grover Weed, and engineer, moved his family to Cleveland, Ohio. Grover was educated and encouraged a sense of adventure in his children. Berenice worked as a homemaker and supported Ethel's work as a social reformer.

== Education and early career ==
Ethel attended Lakewood High School in Cleveland. In 1929 Ethel graduated from Western Reserve University (now Case Western Reserve University) with a bachelor's degree in English. After graduation, Weed worked for eight years as a writer for The Plain Dealer newspaper in Cleveland, Ohio. She traveled in Europe for a short time, returning to Cleveland in 1937, when she began her career in public relations. She was the assistant executive secretary of the PR for the Women's City Club until 1941. She then started her own public relations firm, working for several women's organizations and civic groups, including Cleveland's Women's City Club.

== Japan ==
In 1943, after the United States had declared war on Japan, Weed closed her business and enlisted with the Women's Army Corps. After graduating from Officer's Candidate School in Fort Oglethorpe, Georgia, Weed was commissioned as a lieutenant. Two months after the surrender of Japan, Weed was sent to Yokohama to work with the Civil Information and Education Section (CI&E) of Allied command. After expressing an interest in working with Japanese women, Weed was put in charge of CI&E's Women's Affairs program. In this role, Weed worked tirelessly to promote the interests of Japanese women. Her team, in collaboration with Japanese feminist leaders, helped establish the Women's and Minor's Bureau within the Labour Ministry of the Japanese government and worked to reform the Civil and Criminal Codes to establish legal rights for women in Japan. Weed's team also worked to promote civic and political organizations for Japanese women to ensure that these gains would not be short-lived. Today, Weed is remembered as a pivotal figure in establishing women's rights in postwar Japan.

== Death ==
Weed died of cancer on June 6, 1975, in Newtown, Connecticut.
