= J. Harold Smith =

Southern Baptist evangelist (1910–2001)

J. Harold Smith (June 14, 1910 – November 13, 2001) was a Southern Baptist evangelist and founder of Radio Bible Hour, "broadcasting the Gospel of Jesus Christ since 1935".

Smith was born in Woodruff, South Carolina. On September 4, 1932, he claims to have received Jesus Christ as his Lord and Saviour, resulting in abandonment of his previous plan to attend medical school. Instead, he began preaching, "drawing large audiences in the South Carolina countryside." He started the Radio Bible Hour broadcast in 1935 on a station in Greenville, South Carolina, but the content of his programs soon led the station to stop selling him airtime. Stations in Spartanburg, South Carolina, also refused to broadcast his program, and he finally moved to Knoxville, Tennessee, where he began broadcasting over WNOX radio. Smith's messages frequently found fault with modernistic theology and what he saw as Christians' tendency toward worldliness. The Federal Council of Churches was a target of his program's "pugnacious attacks".

After WNOX canceled Smith's program early in 1946, he organized a protest on April 14 that had 15,000-25,000 people marching past the station's building and the building that housed the Knoxville News Sentinel, the newspaper that owned WNOX. A second protest three weeks later included 10,000 people, with Carl McIntire and Harvey H. Springer speaking in support of Smith and his program. On May 14, 1946, Smith and two other Baptist ministers appeared before the House Un-American Activities Committee, charging that a New York-based "left-wing conspiracy" led to Smith's program's being taken off the air by WNOX.

He helped to develop Christian radio in the 1940s and was the pastor of a number of churches of various sizes and always loved the work of the pastorate. In 1953, as pastor of the First Baptist Church of Fort Smith, Arkansas, he started televising the morning worship services. The broadcast was one of the first regular television broadcasts of a church service in the United States.

In 1953, Smith began broadcasting his program on XERF radio, below the Texas border in Ciudad Acuna, Mexico. Radio Bible Hour ceased operations on December 31, 2017.
