= 1909 in the United States =

- Decades: 1880s; 1890s; 1900s; 1910s; 1920s
- See also: History of the United States (1865–1918); Timeline of United States history (1900–1929); List of years in the United States

Events from the year 1909 in the United States.

== Incumbents ==
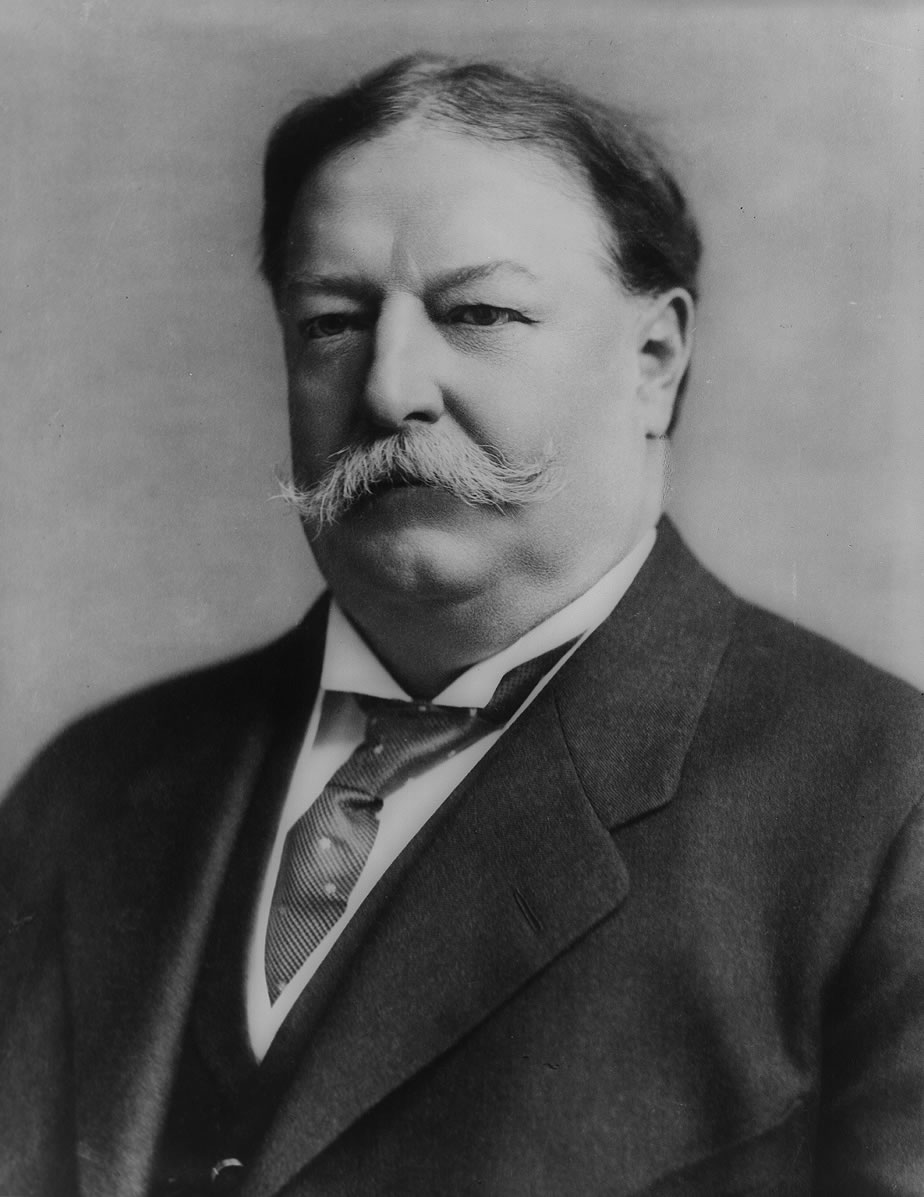
March 4: William Howard Taft becomes the 27th U.S. president

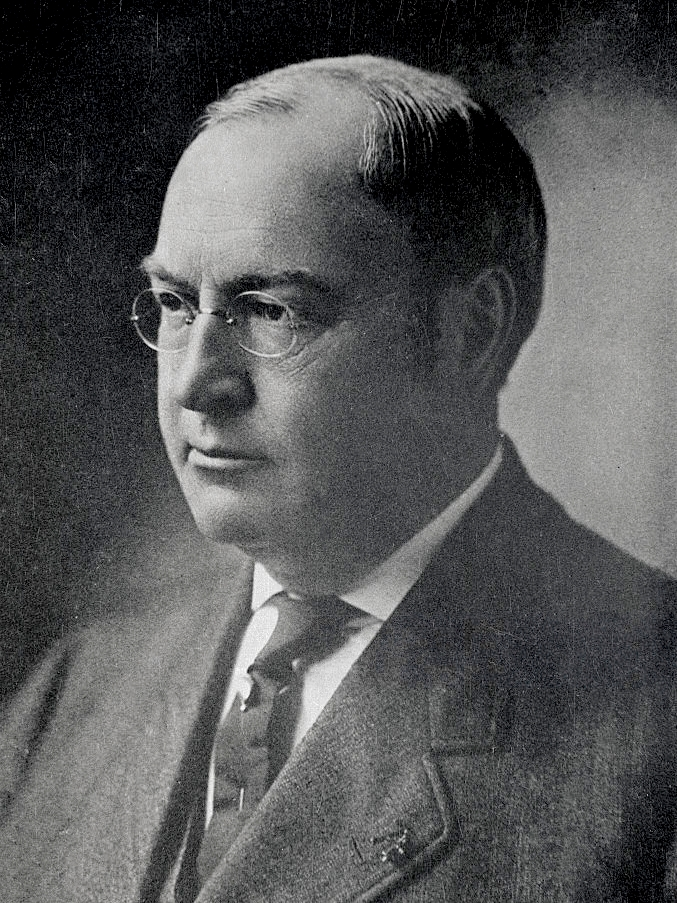
James S. Sherman becomes the 27th U.S. vice president

=== Federal government ===
- President:

Theodore Roosevelt (R-New York) (until March 4)
William Howard Taft (R-Ohio) (starting March 4)

- Vice President:

Charles W. Fairbanks (R-Indiana) (until March 4)
James S. Sherman (R-New York) (starting March 4)

- Chief Justice: Melville Fuller (Illinois)
- Speaker of the House of Representatives: Joseph Gurney Cannon (R-Illinois)
- Congress: 60th (until March 4), 61st (starting March 4)

==== State governments ====
Governors and lieutenant governors

=== Governors ===
- Governor of Alabama: B. B. Comer (Democratic)
- Governor of Arkansas:
  - until January 11: Xenophon Overton Pindall (Democratic)
  - January 11-14: Jesse M. Martin (Democratic)
  - starting January 14: George Washington Donaghey (Democratic)
- Governor of California: James Gillett (Republican)
- Governor of Colorado: Henry Augustus Buchtel (Republican) (until January 12), John F. Shafroth (Democratic) (starting January 12)
- Governor of Connecticut:
  - until January 6: Rollin S. Woodruff (Republican)
  - January 6-April 21: George L. Lilley (Republican)
  - starting April 21: Frank B. Weeks (Republican)
- Governor of Delaware: Preston Lea (Republican) (until January 19), Simeon S. Pennewill (Republican) (starting January 19)
- Governor of Florida: Napoleon B. Broward (Democratic) (until January 5), Albert W. Gilchrist (Democratic) (starting January 5)
- Governor of Georgia: Hoke Smith (Democratic) (until June 26), Joseph M. Brown (Democratic) (starting June 26)
- Governor of Idaho: Frank R. Gooding (Republican) (until January 4), James H. Brady (Republican) (starting January 4)
- Governor of Illinois: Charles S. Deneen (Republican)
- Governor of Indiana: J. Frank Hanly (Republican) (until January 11), Thomas R. Marshall (Democratic) (starting January 11)
- Governor of Iowa: Warren Garst (Republican) (until January 14), Beryl F. Carroll (Republican) (starting January 14)
- Governor of Kansas: Edward W. Hoch (Republican) (until January 11), Walter R. Stubbs (Republican) (starting January 11)
- Governor of Kentucky: Augustus E. Willson (Republican)
- Governor of Louisiana: Jared Young Sanders, Sr. (Democratic)
- Governor of Maine: William T. Cobb (Republican) (until January 6), Bert M. Fernald (Republican) (starting January 6)
- Governor of Maryland: Austin Lane Crothers (Democratic)
- Governor of Massachusetts: Curtis Guild, Jr. (Republican) (until January 7), Eben Sumner Draper (Republican) (starting January 7)
- Governor of Michigan: Fred M. Warner (Republican)
- Governor of Minnesota: John A. Johnson (Democratic) (until September 21), Adolph O. Eberhart (Republican) (starting September 21)
- Governor of Mississippi: Edmond Noel (Democratic)
- Governor of Missouri: Joseph W. Folk (Democratic) (until January 11), Herbert S. Hadley (Republican) (starting January 11)
- Governor of Montana: Edwin L. Norris (Democratic)
- Governor of Nebraska: George L. Sheldon (Republican) (until January 7), Ashton C. Shallenberger (Democratic) (starting January 7)
- Governor of Nevada: Denver S. Dickerson (Silver)
- Governor of New Hampshire: Charles M. Floyd (Republican) (until January 7), Henry B. Quinby (Republican) (starting January 7)
- Governor of New Jersey: John Franklin Fort (Republican)
- Governor of New York: Charles Evans Hughes (Republican)
- Governor of North Carolina: Robert Broadnax Glenn (Democratic) (until January 12), William Walton Kitchin (Democratic) (starting January 12)
- Governor of North Dakota: John Burke (Democratic)
- Governor of Ohio: Andrew L. Harris (Republican) (until January 11), Judson Harmon (Democratic) (starting January 11)
- Governor of Oklahoma: Charles N. Haskell (Democratic)
- Governor of Oregon: George Chamberlain (Democratic) (until March 1), Frank W. Benson (Republican) (starting March 1)
- Governor of Pennsylvania: Edwin Sydney Stuart (Republican)
- Governor of Rhode Island: James H. Higgins (Democratic) (until January 5), Aram J. Pothier (Republican) (starting January 5)
- Governor of South Carolina: Martin Frederick Ansel (Democratic)
- Governor of South Dakota: Coe I. Crawford (Republican) (until January 5), Robert S. Vessey (Republican) (starting January 5)
- Governor of Tennessee: Malcolm R. Patterson (Democratic)
- Governor of Texas: Thomas Mitchell Campbell (Democratic)
- Governor of Utah: John Christopher Cutler (Republican) (until January 4), William Spry (Republican) (starting January 4)
- Governor of Vermont: George H. Prouty (Republican)
- Governor of Virginia: Claude A. Swanson (Democratic)
- Governor of Washington:
  - until January 27: Albert E. Mead (Republican)
  - January 27-March 28: Samuel G. Cosgrove (Republican)
  - starting March 28: Marion E. Hay (Republican)
- Governor of West Virginia: William M. O. Dawson (Republican) (until March 4), William E. Glasscock (Republican) (starting March 4)
- Governor of Wisconsin: James O. Davidson (Republican)
- Governor of Wyoming: Bryant B. Brooks (Republican)

=== Lieutenant governors ===
- Lieutenant Governor of Alabama: Henry B. Gray (Democratic)
- Lieutenant Governor of California: Warren R. Porter (Republican)
- Lieutenant Governor of Colorado: Erastus Harper (Republican) (until January 12), Stephen R. Fitzgarrald (Democratic) (starting January 12)
- Lieutenant Governor of Connecticut:
  - until January 6: Everett J. Lake (Republican)
  - January 6-April 21: Frank B. Weeks (Republican)
  - starting April 21: vacant
- Lieutenant Governor of Delaware: Isaac T. Parker (Republican) (until January 19), John M. Mendinhall (Republican) (starting January 19)
- Lieutenant Governor of Idaho: Ezra A. Burrell (Republican) (until January 4), Lewis H. Sweetser (Republican) (starting January 4)
- Lieutenant Governor of Illinois: Lawrence Sherman (Republican) (until January 18), John G. Oglesby (Republican) (starting January 18)
- Lieutenant Governor of Indiana: Hugh T. Miller (Republican) (until January 11), Frank J. Hall (Democratic) (starting January 11)
- Lieutenant Governor of Iowa: vacant (until January 16), George W. Clarke (Republican) (starting January 16)
- Lieutenant Governor of Kansas: William J. Fitzgerald (Republican)
- Lieutenant Governor of Kentucky: William Hopkinson Cox (Republican)
- Lieutenant Governor of Louisiana: Paul M. Lambremont (Democratic)
- Lieutenant Governor of Massachusetts: Eben Sumner Draper (Republican) (until January 7), Louis A. Frothingham (Republican) (starting January 7)
- Lieutenant Governor of Michigan: Patrick H. Kelley (Republican)
- Lieutenant Governor of Minnesota:
  - until September 21:Adolph Olson Eberhart (Republican)
  - September 21-25: vacant
  - starting September 25: Edward Everett Smith (Republican)
- Lieutenant Governor of Mississippi: Luther Manship (Democratic)
- Lieutenant Governor of Missouri: John C. McKinley (Republican) (until January 11), Jacob Friedrich Gmelich (Republican) (starting month and day unknown)
- Lieutenant Governor of Montana:
  - until month and day unknown: Edwin L. Norris (Democratic)
  - month and day unknown: Benjamin F. White (Republican)
  - starting month and day unknown: William R. Allen (Republican)
- Lieutenant Governor of Nebraska: Melville R. Hopewell (Republican)
- Lieutenant Governor of Nevada: Denver S. Dickerson (Silver) (until May 22), vacant (starting May 22)
- Lieutenant Governor of New York: Horace White (Republican) (starting January 1)
- Lieutenant Governor of North Carolina: Francis D. Winston (Democratic) (until January 12), William C. Newland (Democratic) (starting January 12)
- Lieutenant Governor of North Dakota: Robert S. Lewis (Republican)
- Lieutenant Governor of Ohio: vacant (until January 11), Francis W. Treadway (Republican) (starting January 11)
- Lieutenant Governor of Oklahoma: George W. Bellamy (Democratic)
- Lieutenant Governor of Pennsylvania: Robert S. Murphy (Republican)
- Lieutenant Governor of Rhode Island: Ralph Watrous (Republican) (until January 5), Arthur W. Dennis (Republican) (starting January 5)
- Lieutenant Governor of South Carolina: Thomas Gordon McLeod (Democratic)
- Lieutenant Governor of South Dakota: Howard C. Shober (Republican)
- Lieutenant Governor of Tennessee: E. G. Tollett (Democratic) (until month and day unknown), William Kinney (Democratic) (starting month and day unknown)
- Lieutenant Governor of Texas: Asbury Bascom Davidson (Democratic)
- Lieutenant Governor of Vermont: John A. Mead (Republican)
- Lieutenant Governor of Virginia: James Taylor Ellyson (Democratic)
- Lieutenant Governor of Washington:
  - until January 7: Charles E. Coon (Republican)
  - January 7-27: vacant
  - January 27-March 28: Marion E. Hay (Republican)
  - starting March 28: vacant
- Lieutenant Governor of Wisconsin: William D. Connor (Republican) (until January 4), John Strange (Republican) (starting January 4)

== Events ==
=== January–March ===
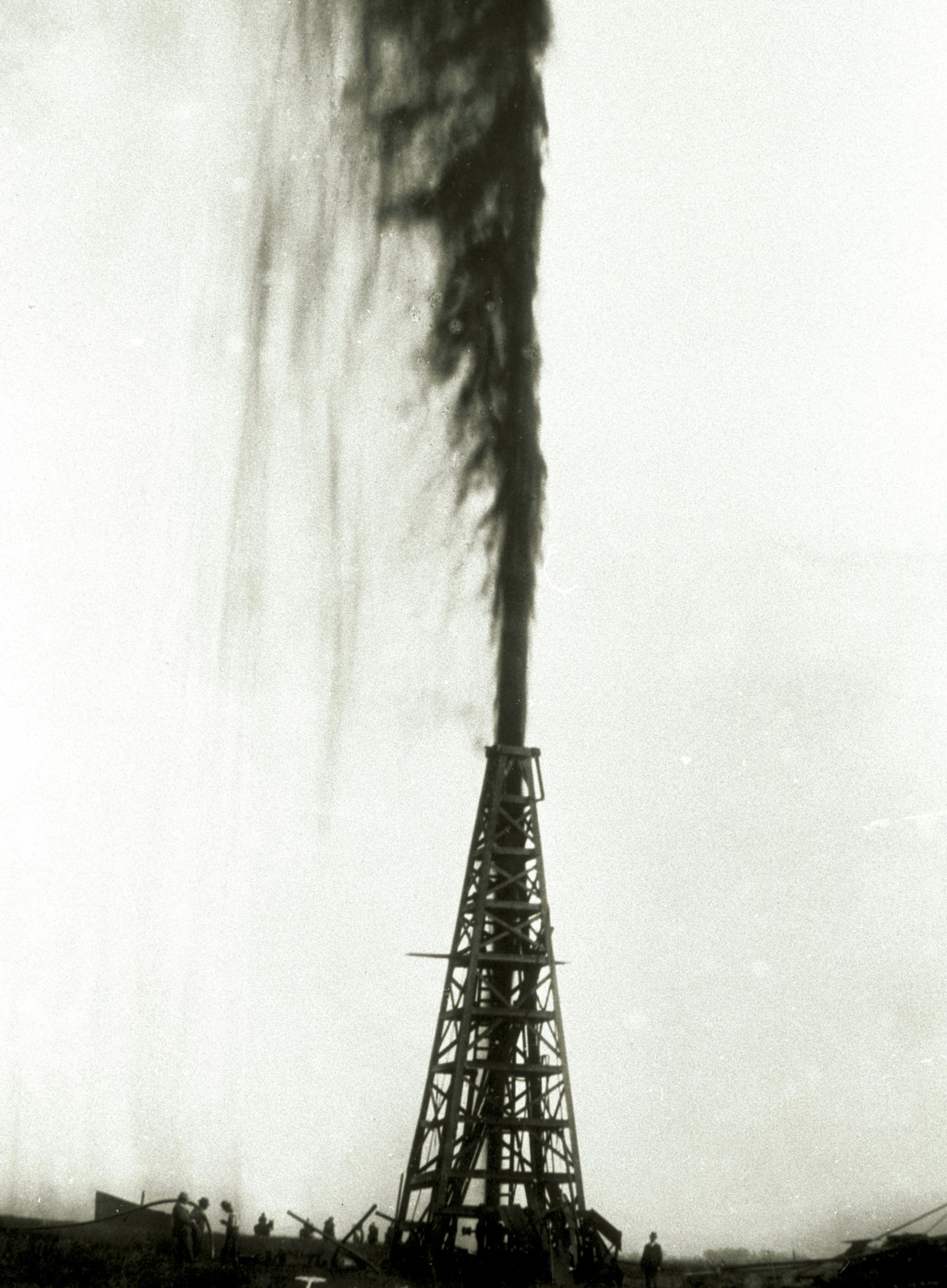
January 1: Lakeview Gusher

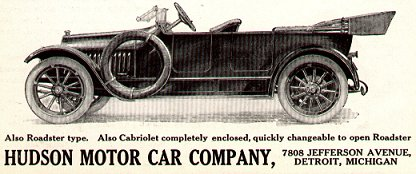
February 24: Hudson founded

- January 1–31 – Torrential rain in California sees Helena Mine record 71.54 inches (1,817.1 mm) of precipitation for the month, the highest official monthly total in the contiguous United States.
- January 1 – Drilling begins on the Lakeview Gusher.
- January 28 – U.S. troops leave Cuba after being there since the Spanish–American War.
- February 2 – Centennial anniversary of the foundation of Miami University (Ohio), which is celebrated.
- February 12 – The National Association for the Advancement of Colored People (NAACP) is founded, commemorating the hundredth anniversary of Abraham Lincoln's birth.
- February 13 – Superior National Forest is established
- February 22 – The Great White Fleet returns to Hampton Roads, Virginia having circumnavigated the globe.
- February 24 – The Hudson Motor Car Company is founded.
- March 4 – William Howard Taft is sworn in as the 27th president of the United States, and James S. Sherman is sworn in as the 27th vice president of the United States.
- March 23 – Theodore Roosevelt leaves New York for the Smithsonian-Roosevelt African Expedition, sponsored by the Smithsonian Institution and National Geographic Society.
- March 30 – Queensboro Bridge opens.

=== April–June ===
- April 9 – Payne–Aldrich Tariff Act passed in Congress.
- April 30 – Palm Beach County is founded, separating from Dade County.
- June 1 – The Alaska–Yukon–Pacific Exposition opens in Seattle.
- June 9–August 7 – Alice Huyler Ramsey, a 22-year-old housewife and mother from Hackensack, New Jersey, becomes the first woman to drive across the United States. In 59 days, she drives a Maxwell automobile 3,800 miles from Manhattan, New York to San Francisco, California with three non-driving female companions.
- June 18 – The strangled body of missionary Elsie Sigel is discovered in a trunk in New York City's Chinatown.
- June 22 – Construction begins on the Cape Cod Canal, which will separate Cape Cod from mainland Massachusetts.

=== July–September ===
- August 2
  - The United States Army Signal Corp Division purchases the world's first military airplane. They buy the Wright Military Flyer from the Wright Brothers.
  - The US Mint releases the 1909-S VDB Lincoln Cent, discontinuing it on August 5 because it shows the initials of engraver Victor David Brenner.
- August 8 – The Rosicrucian Fellowship is launched at Seattle, Washington.
- August 12 – The first event is held at Indianapolis Motor Speedway.
- September – Sigmund Freud, having arrived on August 29 in New York, delivers his only lectures in the United States, on psychoanalysis, at Clark University, Worcester, Massachusetts, giving public recognition to the subject in the anglophone world.
- September 27 – The 5.1 M_{fa} Wabash River earthquake shook western Indiana with a maximum Mercalli intensity of VII (Very strong), causing light damage.

=== October–December ===
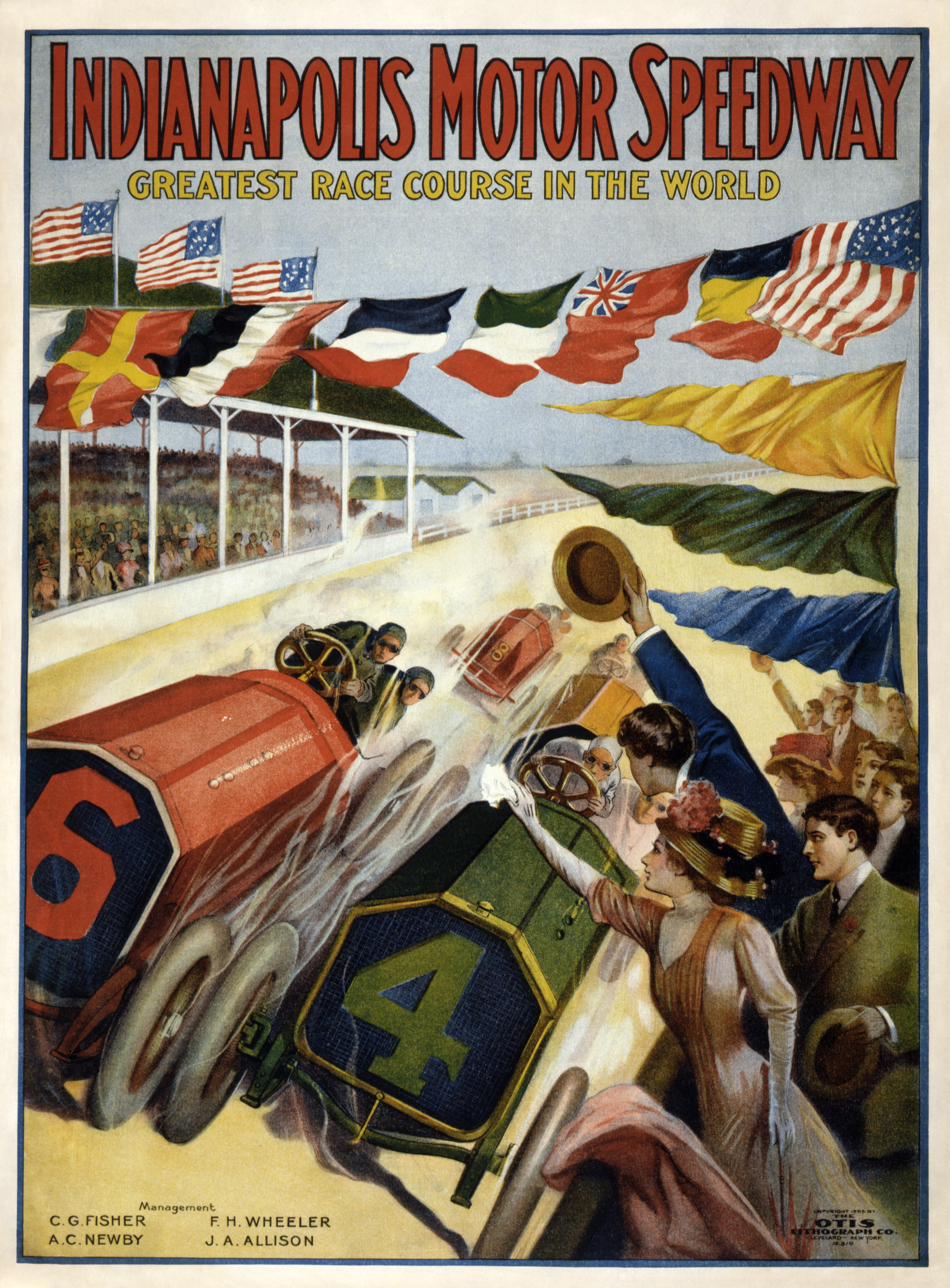
Indianapolis Motor Speedway first season poster

- October 11 – The 1909 Florida Keys hurricane makes landfall in the U.S.
- October 16 – The Pittsburgh Pirates defeat the Detroit Tigers to win the 1909 World Series.
- November – New York shirtwaist strike of 1909 begins.
- November 2 – The Lambda Chi Alpha fraternity is founded at Boston University.
- November 6 – The Union Soldiers and Sailors Monument is dedicated in Baltimore.
- November 8 – Fire at Robert Morrison fibroid comb factory in New York City kills 9.
- November 11 – The U.S. Navy founds a navy base in Pearl Harbor, Hawaii.
- November 13 – Ballinger–Pinchot scandal begins: Collier's Magazine accuses U.S. Secretary of the Interior Richard Ballinger of questionable dealings in Alaskan coal fields.
- November 18 – Two United States Navy ships are sent to Nicaragua after 500 revolutionaries (including 2 Americans) are executed by order of dictator José Santos Zelaya.
- December 31 – The Manhattan Bridge opens.

=== Undated ===
- The American Issue Publishing House of the Anti-Saloon League is incorporated.

=== Ongoing ===
- Progressive Era (1890s–1920s)
- Lochner era (c. 1897–c. 1937)
- Black Patch Tobacco Wars (1904–1909)
- Great White Fleet voyage (1907–1909)

== Births ==
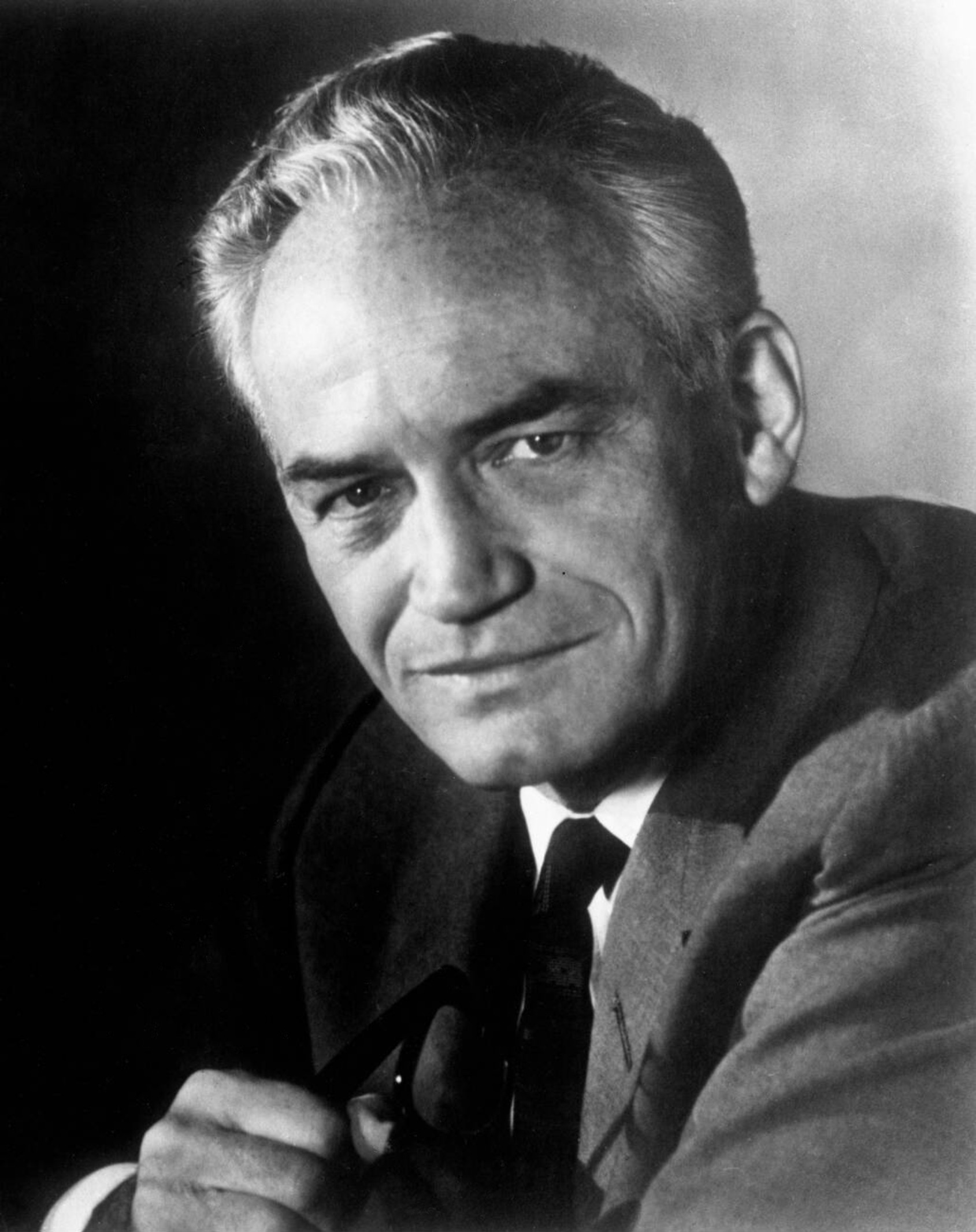
Barry Goldwater

- January 1 – Dana Andrews, film actor (died 1992)
- January 2 – Barry Goldwater, U.S. Senator from Arizona from 1953 to 1965 and from 1969 to 1987 (died 1998)
- January 4 – J. R. Simplot, businessman, founded the Simplot Company (died 2008)
- January 5 – Stephen Cole Kleene, mathematician (died 1994)
- January 16 – Clement Greenberg, art critic (died 1994)
- February 11
  - Max Baer, boxer (died 1959)
  - Joseph L. Mankiewicz, filmmaker (died 1993)
- January 30 – Saul Alinsky, community organizer (died 1972)
- February 9 – Dean Rusk, politician (died 1994)
- February 18 – Warren Elliot Henry, African American physicist (died 2001)
- February 24 – August Derleth, writer and anthologist (died 1971)
- March 4 – Harry Helmsley, real estate entrepreneur (died 1997)
- March 7 – Roger Revelle, scientist (died 1991)
- March 10 – Henrietta Buckmaster, activist, journalist, and author (died 1983)
- March 12 – Virginia McLaurin, community worker and supercentenarian (died 2022)
- March 21 – Edmund Berkeley, computer scientist (died 1988)
- March 22 – Milt Kahl, animator (died 1987)
- March 24 – Clyde Barrow, outlaw (died 1934)
- March 29 – Moon Mullican, country music singer (died 1967)
- April 13 – Eudora Welty, fiction writer (died 2001)
- April 25 – William Pereira, architect (died 1985)
- April 27 – Tom Ewell, actor and producer (died 1994)
- May 6 – Loyd Sigmon, amateur radio broadcaster (died 2004)
- May 7 – Edwin H. Land, camera inventor (died 1991)
- May 15 – J. Caleb Boggs, U.S. Senator from Delaware from 1961 to 1973 (died 1993)
- May 26 – Papa Charlie McCoy, Delta blues musician and songwriter (died 1950)
- May 27
  - Dolores Hope, singer and philanthropist (died 2011)
  - Donald Trumbull, special effects artist (died 2004)
- May 30 – Benny Goodman, jazz clarinetist and bandleader (died 1986)
- June 3 – Ira D. Wallach, businessman and philanthropist (died 2007)
- June 10 – Mary Field, actress (died 1996)
- June 12 – Archie Bleyer, song arranger and bandleader (died 1989)
- June 14 – Burl Ives, folk singer (died 1995 in the United States)
- June 20 – Robb White, writer (died 1990)
- July 2 – Gil English, baseball player (died 1996)
- July 5 – Douglas MacArthur II, diplomat (died 1997)
- July 8 – Ike Petersen, American football player (died 1995)
- July 11 – Irene Hervey, actress (died 1998)
- July 12 – Joe DeRita, comedian (died 1993)
- July 15 – Vera Shlakman, economist (died 2017)
- July 16 – Teddy Buckner, jazz trumpeter (died 1994)
- July 18 – Harriet Nelson, singer and actress (died 1994)
- July 20 – Clyde Roberts, college football player (died 2004)
- July 23 – Helen Martin, actress (died 2000)
- July 25 – Elizabeth Francis, supercentenarian (died 2024)
- July 29 – Chester Himes, fiction writer (died 1984)
- August 1 – Sibyl M. Rock, mathematician (died 1981)
- August 10
  - Leo Fender, guitar inventor and manufacturer (died 1991)
  - Richard J. Hughes, 45th Governor of New Jersey, and Chief Justice of the New Jersey Supreme Court (died 1992)
- September 6 – Michael Gordon, actor and director (died 1993)
- September 12 – Lawrence Brooks, army veteran and supercentenarian (died 2022)
- September 15 – Phil Arnold, actor (died 1968)
- September 24 – Carl Sigman, songwriter (died 2000)
- September 26 – Bill France Sr., race car driver and businessman, co-founder of NASCAR (died 1992)
- September 28 – Al Capp, cartoonist (died 1979)
- October 1 – Everett Sloane, character actor (died 1965)
- October 7 – Tony Malinosky, baseball player (died 2011)
- October 10 – Max Ehrlich, writer (died 1983)
- October 13 – Herblock, editorial cartoonist (died 2001)
- October 14 – Dorothy Kingsley, screenwriter and producer (died 1997)
- October 15
  - Margie Hines, voice actress (died 1985)
  - Robert Trout, journalist (died 2000)
- October 17 – Cozy Cole, jazz drummer (died 1981)
- October 20 – Carla Laemmle, actress (died 2014)
- October 27 – Henry Townsend, blues musician (died 2006)
- November 7 – Ruby Hurley, civil rights activist (died 1980)
- November 25 – P. D. Eastman, author and illustrator (died 1986)
- November 18 – Johnny Mercer, songwriter (died 1976)
- November 20 – Alan Bible, U.S. Senator from Nevada from 1954 to 1974 (died 1988)
- November 27 – James Agee, writer (died 1955)
- December 9 – Douglas Fairbanks, Jr., film actor (died 2000)
- December 14 – Edward Tatum, geneticist, Nobel Prize laureate (died 1975)
- December 22 – Alan Carney, actor (died 1973)
- December 29 – Thomas Beck, actor (died 1995)
- December 31 – Jonah Jones, jazz trumpeter (died 2000)

== Deaths ==
- January 10
  - John Conness, Ireland-born U.S. Senator from California from 1863 to 1869 (born 1821)
  - Charles Vernon Culver, politician (born 1830)
- April 9 – Francis Marion Crawford, novelist (born 1854)
- April 21 – David Turpie, U.S. Senator from Indiana in 1863 and from 1887 to 1899 (born 1828)
- April 23 – Franklin Bartlett, Representative from New York (born 1847)
- April 28 – Frederick Holbrook, 27th Governor of Vermont from 1861 to 1863 (born 1813)
- May 17 – Helge Alexander Haugan, Norwegian-born banking executive (born 1847)
- June 10 – Gideon T. Stewart, educator and politician (born 1824)
- June 24 – Sarah Orne Jewett, writer (born 1849)
- June 29 – George B. Cosby, Confederate general in the American Civil War (born 1830)
- August 21 – George Cabot Lodge, poet (born 1873)
- September 4 – Clyde Fitch, dramatist (born 1865)
- October 15 – William Lindsay, U.S. Senator from Kentucky from 1893 to 1901 (born 1835)
- October 26 – Oliver Otis Howard, Union general and United States Army officer (born 1830)
- December 10 – Red Cloud, Oglala Lakota Chief (born 1822)
- December 20 – William Alexander Harris, U.S. Senator from Kansas from 1897 to 1903 (born 1841)
- December 24 – Jean Clemens, youngest child of Mark Twain (born 1880)
- December 26
  - Frederic Remington, cowboy artist and sculptor (born 1864)
  - Mary Jane Richardson Jones, abolitionist (born 1819)

== See also ==
- List of American films of 1909
- Timeline of United States history (1900–1929)
