= John K. Bucklyn =

American Soldier

- Born: March 15, 1834; Foster Creek, Rhode Island, US
- Died: May 15, 1906 (aged 72); Mystic, Connecticut, US
- Burial place: Lower Mystic Cemetery, Connecticut
- Military career
- Allegiance: United States of America
- Branch: United States Army
- Rank: First Lieutenant
- Unit: Battery E, 1st Regiment Rhode Island Volunteer Light Artillery
- Conflicts: Battle of Chancellorsville
- Awards: Medal of Honor

First Lieutenant John Knight Bucklyn (March 15, 1834 to May 15, 1906) was an American soldier who fought in the American Civil War. Bucklyn received the country's highest award for bravery during combat, the Medal of Honor, for his action during the Battle of Chancellorsville in Virginia on 3 May 1863. He was honored with the award on 13 July 1899.

== Biography ==
Bucklyn was born in Foster Creek, Rhode Island on 15 March 1834 and enlisted into the 1st Rhode Island Light Artillery.

Two months after the events for which he earned the Medal of Honor, Bucklyn served as 1st Lieutenant and commander of his battery and was involved in the Battle of Gettysburg, where he suffered injuries on 2 July 1863. He returned to active service just two months later and was appointed Assistant Aide to the Adjutant-General under Colonel Thompkins'. He again displayed gallantry during a battle at Shenandoah and brevetted to captain on 19 October 1864.

He died on 15 May 1906 and his remains are interred at the Lower Mystic Cemetery in Connecticut.

== Medal of Honor citation ==
Though himself wounded, gallantly fought his section of the battery under a fierce fire from the enemy until his ammunition was all expended, many of the cannoneers and most of the horses killed or wounded, and the enemy within 25 yards of the guns, when, disabling one piece, he brought off the other in safety.

== See also ==
- List of American Civil War Medal of Honor recipients: A–F
