= Jeffrey Hazard =

American judge (1762–1840)

Jeffrey Hazard (1762 – 1840) was a justice of the Rhode Island Supreme Court from May 1810 to May 1818, and Lieutenant-Governor of Rhode Island from 1833 to 1835, and from 1836 to 1837.

Hazard's father, in his will, dated June 1, 1773, probated December 14, 1773, gives "my son Jeffrey all my lands lying in Exeter and in West Greenwich".

In addition his service as a supreme court justice and as lieutenant governor, Hazard was also "for many years Representative in the General Assembly, and chief justice of the Court of Common Pleas".

Hazard married Amey, daughter of Thomas Tillinghast; she was born in 1773, and died June 3, 1870. They had a large family.
