= Alexander M. Jenkins =

American politician

Alexander M. Jenkins (1802 – February 13, 1864) was an American politician. Between 1834 and 1836 he served as Lieutenant Governor of Illinois.

== Life ==
Jenkins settled in Jackson County, Illinois as a youth, residing in Brownsville. He engaged in trade before studying law and practiced his profession in Southern Illinois. He was elected to the Illinois House of Representatives in 1830 and 1832, serving as Speaker in his second term. During this time, he participated in the Black Hawk War as captain of a volunteer company. In 1834, he was elected Lieutenant Governor as a member of the Democratic Party, serving under Governor Joseph Duncan, a Whig. Jenkins resigned mid-way through his term to become President of the Illinois Central Railroad. He was later Receiver of Public Moneys at the United States General Land Office in Edwardsville, Illinois and was a delegate to the Illinois state constitutional convention from Jackson County in 1847. In 1859, he was elected Circuit Judge for the Third Judicial Circuit and was re-elected in 1861. He died on February 13, 1864.

Jenkins was the uncle of John A. Logan, later a General of the Union Army and U.S. Senator from Illinois, to whom he taught law.

Political offices
Preceded by William Lee D. Ewing	Lieutenant Governor of Illinois; 1834–1836	Succeeded by William Davidson
