= 1840 in the United States =

- Decades: 1820s; 1830s; 1840s; 1850s; 1860s
- See also: History of the United States (1789–1849); Timeline of United States history (1820–1859); List of years in the United States

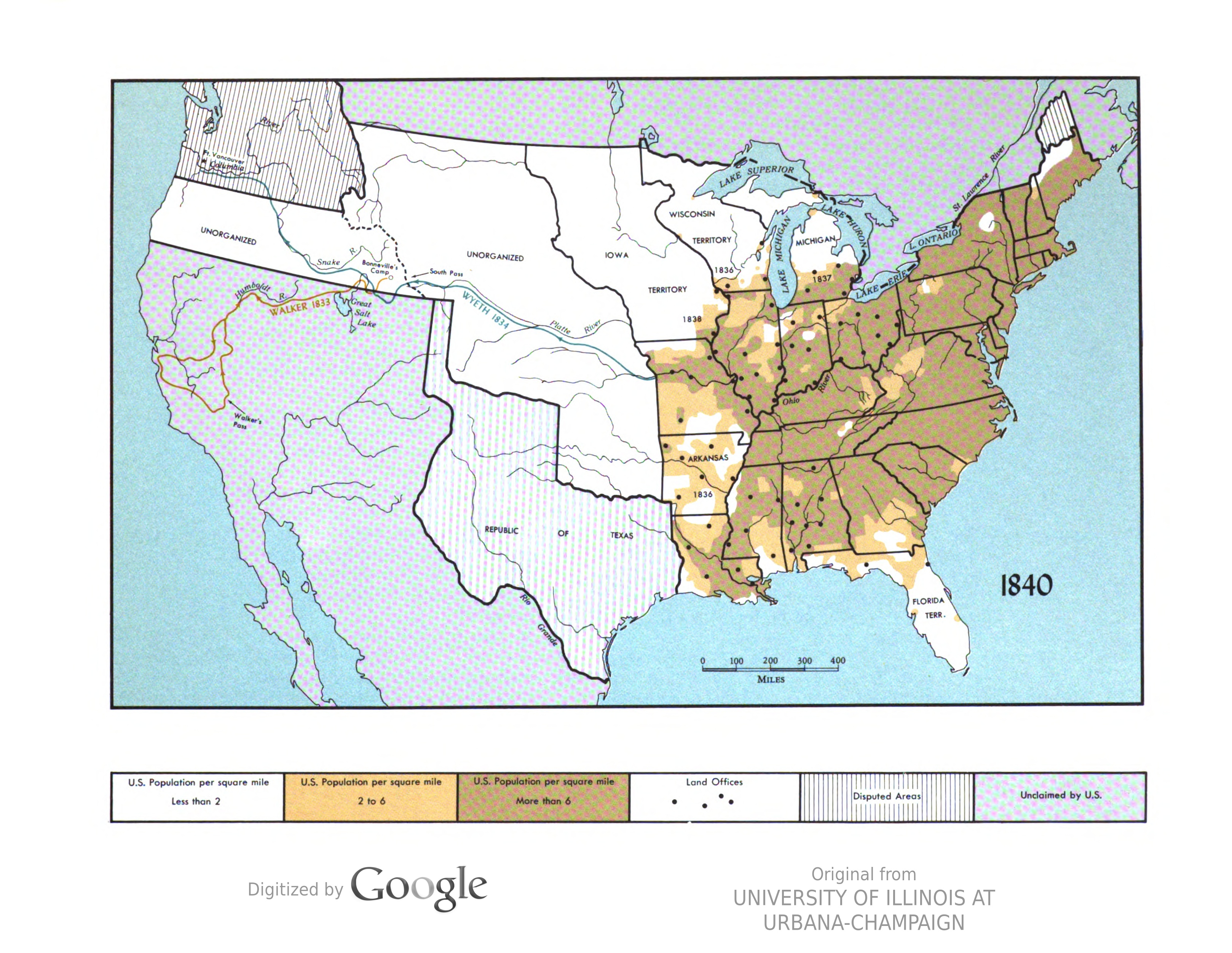
1840 in the United States, showing Joseph R. Walker's exploration route through California and Nathaniel Jarvis Wyeth's route to the Oregon Country

Events from the year 1840 in the United States.

== Incumbents ==
=== Federal government ===
- President: Martin Van Buren (D-New York)
- Vice President: Richard M. Johnson (D-Kentucky)
- Chief Justice: Roger B. Taney (Maryland)
- Speaker of the House of Representatives: Robert Mercer Taliaferro Hunter (W-Virginia)
- Congress: 26th

==== State governments ====
Governors and lieutenant governors

=== Governors ===
- Governor of Alabama: Arthur P. Bagby (Democratic)
- Governor of Arkansas: James Sevier Conway (Democratic) (until November 4), Archibald Yell (Democratic) (starting November 4)
- Governor of Connecticut: William W. Ellsworth (Whig)
- Governor of Delaware: Cornelius P. Comegys (Whig)
- Governor of Georgia: Charles J. McDonald (Democratic)
- Governor of Illinois: Thomas Carlin (Democratic)
- Governor of Indiana: David Wallace (Whig) (until December 9), Samuel Bigger (Whig) (starting December 9)
- Governor of Kentucky: Charles A. Wickliffe (Whig) (until September 2), Robert P. Letcher (Whig) (starting September 2)
- Governor of Louisiana: André B. Roman (Whig)
- Governor of Maine: John Fairfield (Democratic)
- Governor of Maryland: William Grason (Democratic)
- Governor of Massachusetts: Edward Everett (Whig) (until January 18), Marcus Morton (Democratic) (starting January 18)
- Governor of Michigan: Stevens T. Mason (Democratic) (until January 7), William Woodbridge (Whig) (starting January 7)
- Governor of Mississippi: Alexander G. McNutt (Democratic)
- Governor of Missouri: Lilburn W. Boggs (Democratic) (until November 16), Thomas Reynolds (Democratic) (starting November 16)
- Governor of New Hampshire: John Page (Democratic)
- Governor of New Jersey: William Pennington (Whig)
- Governor of New York: William H. Seward (Whig)
- Governor of North Carolina: Edward Bishop Dudley (Whig)
- Governor of Ohio: Wilson Shannon (Democratic) (until December 16), Thomas Corwin (Whig) (starting December 16)
- Governor of Pennsylvania: David R. Porter (Democratic)
- Governor of Rhode Island: Samuel Ward King (Rhode Island)
- Governor of South Carolina:
  - until April 7: Patrick Noble (Democratic)
  - April 7-December 9: Barnabas Kelet Henagan (Democratic)
  - starting December 9: John Peter Richardson II (Democratic)
- Governor of Tennessee: James K. Polk (Democratic)
- Governor of Vermont: Silas H. Jennison (Whig)
- Governor of Virginia: David Campbell (Democratic) (until March 31), Thomas Walker Gilmer (Whig) (starting March 31)

=== Lieutenant governors ===
- Lieutenant Governor of Connecticut: Charles Hawley (Whig)
- Lieutenant Governor of Indiana: David Hillis (Whig) (until December 9), Samuel Hall (Whig) (starting December 9)
- Lieutenant Governor of Illinois: Stinson Anderson (Democratic)
- Lieutenant Governor of Kentucky: vacant (until September 2), Manlius Valerius Thomson (political party unknown) (starting September 2)
- Lieutenant Governor of Massachusetts: George Hull (political party unknown)
- Lieutenant Governor of Michigan: Edward Mundy (Democratic) (until month and day unknown), James Wright Gordon (Whig) (starting month and day unknown)
- Lieutenant Governor of Missouri: Franklin Cannon (Democratic) (until November 16), Meredith Miles Marmaduke (Democratic) (starting November 16)
- Lieutenant Governor of New York: Luther Bradish (Whig)
- Lieutenant Governor of Rhode Island: vacant (until month and day unknown), Byron Diman (political party unknown) (starting month and day unknown)
- Lieutenant Governor of South Carolina:
  - until April 7: Barnabas Kelet Henagan (Democratic)
  - April 7-December 9: vacant
  - starting December 9: William K. Clowney (Democratic)
- Lieutenant Governor of Vermont: David M. Camp (Whig)

== Events ==
- January 13–14 – The steamship Lexington burns and sinks in icy waters, 4 miles off the coast of Long Island; 139 die, only 4 survive.
- January 19 – Captain Charles Wilkes circumnavigates Antarctica, claiming what becomes known as Wilkes Land for the United States.
- March 4 – Alexander S. Wolcott and John Johnson open their "Daguerreian Parlor" on Broadway (Manhattan), the world's first commercial photography portrait studio.
- March 9 – The Wilmington and Raleigh Railroad is completed from Wilmington, North Carolina to Weldon, North Carolina. At 161.5 miles, it was the world's longest railroad at the time.
- April – The Raleigh and Gaston Railroad is completed from Raleigh, North Carolina to near Weldon, North Carolina.
- May 7 – The Great Natchez Tornado: A massive tornado strikes Natchez, Mississippi during the early afternoon hours. Before it is over, 317 people are killed and 109 injured. It is the second deadliest tornado in U.S. history.
- November 7 – 1840 United States presidential election: William Henry Harrison defeats Martin Van Buren.

=== Ongoing ===
- Second Seminole War (1835–1842)

== Births ==
- January 1 – Patrick Walsh, Irish-born U.S. Senator from Georgia from 1894 to 1895 (died 1899)
- January 29 – Henry H. Rogers, financier (died 1909)
- February 4 – Hiram Stevens Maxim, firearms inventor (died 1916)
- February 9 – William T. Sampson, U.S. Navy admiral (died 1902)
- March 5 – Constance Fenimore Woolson, fiction writer and poet (died 1894)
- April 28 – Caroline Shawk Brooks, sculptor (died 1913)
- May 1 – Cynthia S. Burnett, educator, temperance reformer, and newspaper editor (died 1932)
- May 4 – George Gray, U.S. Senator from Delaware from 1885 to 1899 (died 1925)
- June 3 – Michael O'Laughlen, conspirator in the assassination of Abraham Lincoln in 1865 (died 1867)
- June 6 – William Dudley Chipley, railroad tycoon and statesman (died 1897)
- June 14 – William F. Nast, attaché, railroad executive and inventor (died 1893)
- June 27 – Alpheus Beede Stickney, railroad executive (died 1916)
- July 6 – Peter Conover Hains, army officer and military engineer (died 1921)
- July 10 – Esther G. Frame, Quaker minister and evangelist (died 1920)
- July 21 – Christian Abraham Fleetwood, Union Army 4th Colored Infantry Regiment soldier and Medal of Honor recipient (died 1914)
- July 28 – Edward Drinker Cope, scientist (died 1897)
- August 25 – George C. Magoun, railroad executive (died 1893)
- August 28 – Ira D. Sankey, gospel singer and composer (died 1908)
- September 10 – William B. Avery, Union Army soldier and Medal of Honor recipient (died 1894)
- September 22 – Philip G. Shadrach, Union Army soldier and Medal of Honor recipient (died 1862)
- September 22 – D. M. Canright, Seventh-day Adventist minister and author, later one of the church's severest critics (died 1919)
- September 27 – Alfred Thayer Mahan, U.S. Navy admiral, geostrategist and historian (died 1914)
- September 23 – Simon B. Conover, U.S. Senator from Florida from 1873 to 1879 (died 1908)
- October 1 – Anthony Higgins, U.S. Senator from Delaware from 1889 to 1895 (died 1912)
- October 24 – Eliza Pollock, archer (died 1919)
- November 24 – John Brashear, astronomer (died 1920)
- Earliest probable date – Crazy Horse (Tȟašúŋke Witkó), Chief of the Oglala Lakota (killed 1877)

== Deaths ==
- March 11 – George Wolf, politician (born 1777)
- March 23 – William Maclure, geologist (born 1763 in Scotland; died in Mexico)
- April 7 – Thaddeus Betts, U.S. Senator from Connecticut from 1839 to 1840 (born 1789)
- June 26 – William Smith, U.S. Senator from South Carolina from 1816 to 1823, and 1826 to 1831 (born c. 1762)
- August 10 – Seymour Brunson, early Mormon convert (born 1798)
- August 27 – William Kneass, second Chief Engraver of the United States Mint from 1824 to 1840 (born 1781)
- September 14 – Joseph Smith Sr., first Presiding Patriarch of the Latter Day Saint movement (born 1771)
- September 18 – Constantine Samuel Rafinesque, French polymath (born 1783 in the Ottoman Empire)
- June 14 – Anson Brown, lawyer and U.S. Representative from New York from 1839 to 1840 (born 1800)

== See also ==
- Timeline of United States history (1820–1859)
