= 1838 in the United States =

- Decades: 1810s; 1820s; 1830s; 1840s; 1850s
- See also: History of the United States (1789–1849); Timeline of United States history (1820–1859); List of years in the United States

Events from the year 1838 in the United States.

== Incumbents ==
=== Federal government ===
- President: Martin Van Buren (D-New York)
- Vice President: Richard M. Johnson (D-Kentucky)
- Chief Justice: Roger B. Taney (Maryland)
- Speaker of the House of Representatives: James K. Polk (D-Tennessee)
- Congress: 25th

==== State governments ====
Governors and lieutenant governors

=== Governors ===
- Governor of Alabama: Arthur P. Bagby (Democratic)
- Governor of Arkansas: James Sevier Conway (Democratic)
- Governor of Connecticut: Henry W. Edwards (Democratic) (until May 2), William W. Ellsworth (Whig) (starting May 2)
- Governor of Delaware: Cornelius P. Comegys (Whig)
- Governor of Georgia: George R. Gilmer (Whig)
- Governor of Illinois: Joseph Duncan (Whig) (until December 7), Thomas Carlin (Democratic) (starting December 7)
- Governor of Indiana: David Wallace (Whig)
- Governor of Kentucky: James Clark (Whig)
- Governor of Louisiana: Edward Douglass White Sr. (Whig)
- Governor of Maine:
  - until January 3: Robert P. Dunlap (Democratic)
  - January 3-19: vacant
  - starting January 19: Edward Kent (Whig)
- Governor of Maryland: Thomas W. Veazey (Whig)
- Governor of Massachusetts: Edward Everett (Whig)
- Governor of Michigan: Stevens T. Mason (Democratic)
- Governor of Mississippi: Charles Lynch (Democratic) (until January 8), Alexander G. McNutt (Democratic) (starting January 8)
- Governor of Missouri: Lilburn W. Boggs (Democratic)
- Governor of New Hampshire: Isaac Hill (Democratic)
- Governor of New Jersey: William Pennington (Whig)
- Governor of New York: William L. Marcy (Democratic) (until end of December 31)
- Governor of North Carolina: Edward Bishop Dudley (Whig)
- Governor of Ohio: Joseph Vance (Whig) (until December 13), Wilson Shannon (Democratic) (starting December 13)
- Governor of Pennsylvania: Joseph Ritner (Anti-Masonic)
- Governor of Rhode Island: John Brown Francis (Democratic) (until May 2), William Sprague III (Democratic) (starting May 2)
- Governor of South Carolina: Pierce Mason Butler (Democratic) (until December 7), Patrick Noble (Democratic) (starting December 7)
- Governor of Tennessee: Newton Cannon (Whig)
- Governor of Vermont: Silas H. Jennison (Whig)
- Governor of Virginia: David Campbell (Democratic)

=== Lieutenant governors ===
- Lieutenant Governor of Connecticut: Ebenezer Stoddard (Democratic-Republican) (until May 2), Charles Hawley (Whig) (starting May 2)
- Lieutenant Governor of Illinois: William H. Davidson (Democratic) (until December 7), Stinson Anderson (Democratic) (starting month and day unknown)
- Lieutenant Governor of Indiana: David Hillis (Whig)
- Lieutenant Governor of Kentucky: Charles A. Wickliffe (Democratic-Republican)
- Lieutenant Governor of Massachusetts: George Hull (political party unknown)
- Lieutenant Governor of Missouri: Franklin Cannon (Democratic)
- Lieutenant Governor of New York: John Tracy (Democratic) (until end of December 31)
- Lieutenant Governor of Rhode Island: Benjamin Babock Thurston (political party unknown) (until May 2), Joseph Childs (political party unknown) (starting May 2)
- Lieutenant Governor of South Carolina: William DuBose (Democratic) (until December 7), Barnabas Kelet Henagan (Democratic) (starting December 7)
- Lieutenant Governor of Vermont: David M. Camp (Whig)

== Events ==
=== January–March ===
- January 6–11 – Samuel Morse first publicly demonstrates electric telegraphy, at Morristown, New Jersey, assisted by Alfred Vail and using dots and dashes, the forerunner of Morse code.
- January 12 – History of the Latter Day Saint movement: Joseph Smith and Sidney Rigdon flee Ohio for Missouri.
- January 27 – Abraham Lincoln speaks at the Springfield Young Men's Lyceum.
- March 8 – The New Orleans Mint strikes its first coinage, 30 dimes.

=== April–June ===
- May 25 – Trail of Tears: The Cherokee removal begins with the forced relocation of the Cherokee Native American tribe, which resulted in the deaths of an estimated 4,000 Cherokee Indians.
- June 12 – Iowa Territory is created. At the time of its founding, Iowa Territory encompassed parts of modern-day Minnesota, South Dakota, North Dakota, as well as all of Iowa. The river city of Burlington functions as the territorial capital until 1841.

=== July–September ===
- July 3 – Iowa Territory is effective.
- August 18 – The United States Exploring Expedition sets sail from Hampton Roads, Virginia.
- September 3 – Dressed in a sailor's uniform and carrying identification papers provided by a free Black seaman, future abolitionist Frederick Douglass boards a train in Maryland on his way to freedom from slavery.
- September 4 – Potawatomi Trail of Death, the forced relocation of 859 members of the Potawatomi nation from Indiana to Kansas, begins. More than 40 Potawatomi die from disease and the stress of the march.

=== October–December ===
- October 5 – Killough massacre, believed to have been both the largest and last Native American attack on white settlers in East Texas; 18 casualties are either killed or carried away.
- October 16 – Grave Creek Stone, a probable hoax, allegedly discovered in Moundsville, West Virginia.
- October 27 – Governor of Missouri Lilburn Boggs issues Missouri Executive Order 44 (the "Extermination Order"), ordering the expulsion of all Mormons from the state. This winter, Mormons fleeing this persecution are welcomed in Quincy, Illinois.
- November 4 – Survivors of the Potawatomi Trail of Death arrive at the modern-day site of Osawatomie, Kansas.

=== Undated ===
- Duke University is established in North Carolina as the Brown School.
- Second Seminole War (1835–1842)

== Births ==
- January 4 – General Tom Thumb, circus performer and entertainer (died 1883)
- January 27 – I. P. Durfee, Minnesota State Senator (died 1916)
- January 29 – Edward W. Morley, chemist (died 1923)
- February 10 – Gustav Oelwein, founder of Oelwein, Iowa (died 1913)
- February 12 – Julius Dresser, writer (died 1893)
- February 16 – Henry Adams, historian (died 1918)
- February 22 – Margaret Elizabeth Sangster, poet (died 1912)
- March 3 – George William Hill, astronomer (died 1914)
- April 3 – John Willis Menard, African American politician (died 1893)
- April 12 – John Shaw Billings, military and medical leader (died 1913)
- April 16 – Martha McClellan Brown, temperance leader (died 1916)
- May 10 – John Wilkes Booth, actor and assassin of the 16th president of the United States, Abraham Lincoln (killed 1865)
- May 12 – James McMillan, Canadian-born U.S. Senator from Michigan from 1889 to 1902 (died 1902)
- June 16 – Cushman Kellogg Davis, 7th Governor of Minnesota from 1874 to 1876 and U.S. Senator from Minnesota from 1887 to 1900 (died 1900)
- July 4 – Alonzo W. Slayback, Confederate military officer (died 1882)
- July 8 – James B. McCreary, U.S. Senator from Kentucky from 1911 to 1915 (died 1918)
- July 9 – Philip Bliss, Gospel composer (died 1876)
- July 18 – John A. Kimberly, entrepreneur, co-founder of Kimberly-Clark (died 1928)
- July 20 – Augustin Daly, dramatist and theatre manager (died 1899)
- July 30 – Henry A. du Pont, U.S. Senator from Delaware from 1906 to 1917 (died 1926)
- July Full Date Unknown – Bass Reeves, one of the first black Deputy U.S. Marshals west of the Mississippi River (died 1910)
- September 29 – Henry Hobson Richardson, city architect (died 1886)
- October 1 – Joseph Clay Stiles Blackburn, U.S. Senator from Kentucky from 1885 to 1897 and 1901 to 1907 (died 1918)
- October 2 – Hester A. Benedict, president, Pacific Coast Women's Press Association (died 1921)
- October 8 – John Hay, author, biographer, 37th United States Secretary of State (died 1905)
- November 13 – Joseph F. Smith, 6th president of the Church of Jesus Christ of Latter-day Saints (d. 1918)
- December 3 – Cleveland Abbe, meteorologist (died 1916)
- December 22 – Clara Doty Bates, poet; children's literature author (died 1895)

== Deaths ==
- January 12 – Joshua Humphreys, naval architect (born 1751)
- January 30 – Osceola, a leader of the Seminole during the Second Seminole War (born 1804; quinsy)
- March 7 – Robert Townsend, member of the Culper Spy Ring (born 1753)
- March 16 – Nathaniel Bowditch, mathematician (born 1773)
- August 1 – John Rodgers, naval officer (born 1772)
- August 19 – James Geddes, engineer, surveyor, New York State legislator and U.S. Congressman (born 1763)
- September 1 – William Clark, explorer (born 1770)
- October 3 – Black Hawk, a leader of the Sauk people (born 1767)
- October 23 – Joseph Lancaster, English-born Quaker educationist (born 1778)

== See also ==
- Timeline of United States history (1820–1859)
