= 1837 in the United States =

- Decades: 1810s; 1820s; 1830s; 1840s; 1850s
- See also: History of the United States (1789–1849); Timeline of United States history (1820–1859); List of years in the United States

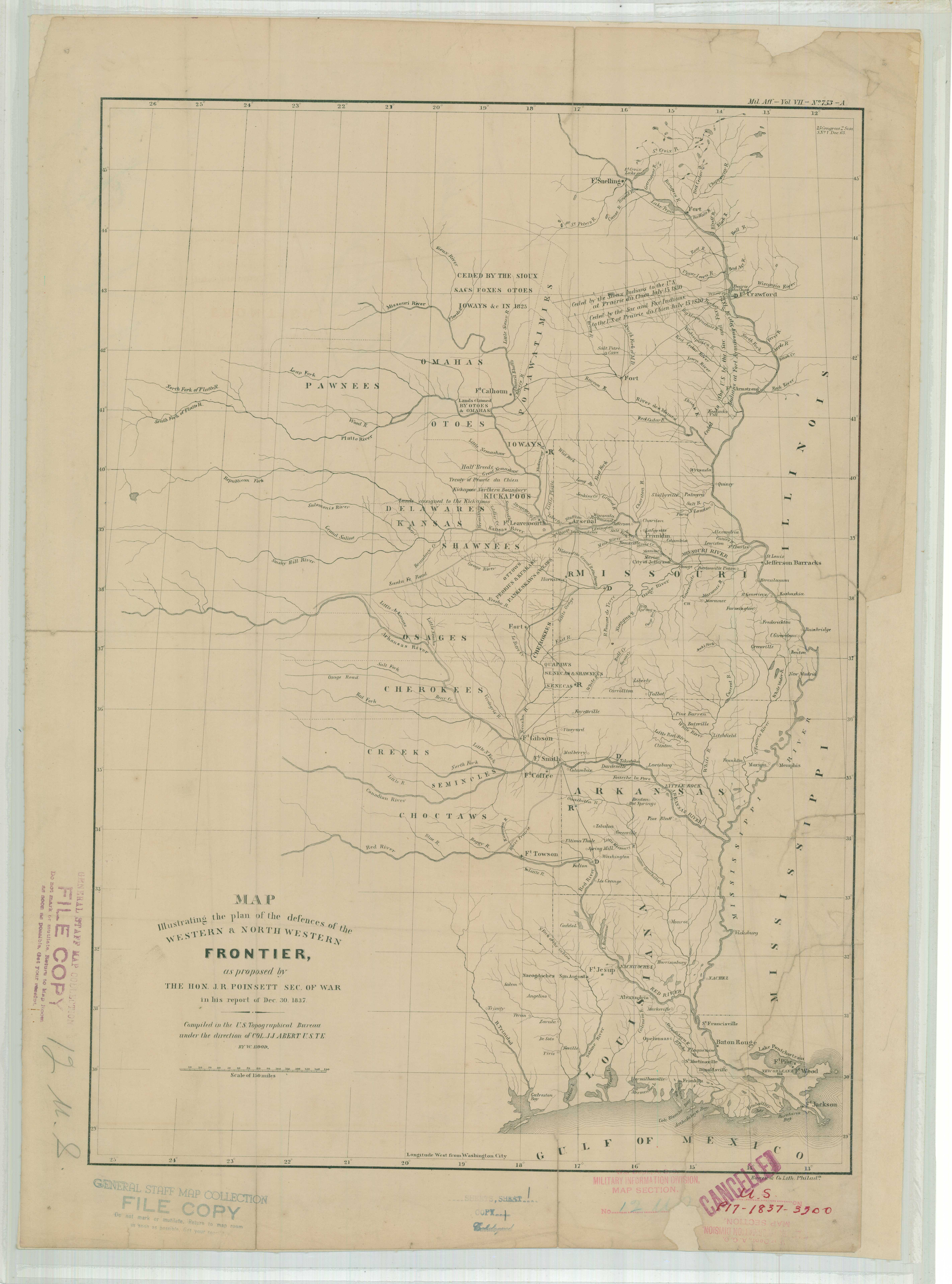
"Map Illustrating the Plan of the Defenses of the Western and Southwestern Frontier" published 1837 (NARA 77452208)

Events from the year 1837 in the United States.

== Incumbents ==
=== Federal government ===
- President:

Andrew Jackson (D-Tennessee) (until March 4)
Martin Van Buren (D-New York) (starting March 4)

- Vice President:

Martin Van Buren (D-New York) (until March 4)
Richard M. Johnson (D-Kentucky) (starting March 4)

- Chief Justice: Roger B. Taney (Maryland)
- Speaker of the House of Representatives: James K. Polk (D-Tennessee)
- Congress: 24th (until March 4), 25th (starting March 4)

==== State governments ====
Governors and lieutenant governors

=== Governors ===
- Governor of Alabama:
  - until July 17: Clement Comer Clay (Democratic)
  - July 17-November 30: Hugh McVay (Democratic)
  - starting November 30: Arthur P. Bagby (Democratic)
- Governor of Arkansas: James Sevier Conway (Democratic)
- Governor of Connecticut: Henry W. Edwards (Democratic)
- Governor of Delaware: Charles Polk Jr. (Whig) (until January 17), Cornelius P. Comegys (Whig) (starting January 17)
- Governor of Georgia: William Schley (Democratic) (until November 8), George R. Gilmer (Whig) (starting November 8)
- Governor of Illinois: Joseph Duncan (Whig)
- Governor of Indiana: Noah Noble (Whig) (until December 6), David Wallace (Whig) (starting December 6)
- Governor of Kentucky: James Clark (Whig)
- Governor of Louisiana: Edward Douglass White Sr. (Whig)
- Governor of Maine: Robert P. Dunlap (Democratic)
- Governor of Maryland: Thomas W. Veazey (Whig)
- Governor of Massachusetts: Edward Everett (Whig)
- Governor of Michigan: Stevens T. Mason (Democratic) (starting January 26)
- Governor of Mississippi: Charles Lynch (Democratic)
- Governor of Missouri: Lilburn W. Boggs (Democratic)
- Governor of New Hampshire: Isaac Hill (Democratic)
- Governor of New Jersey: Philemon Dickerson (Democratic) (until October 27), William Pennington (Whig) (starting October 27)
- Governor of New York: William L. Marcy (Democratic)
- Governor of North Carolina: Edward Bishop Dudley (Whig)
- Governor of Ohio: Joseph Vance (Whig)
- Governor of Pennsylvania: Joseph Ritner (Anti-Masonic)
- Governor of Rhode Island: John Brown Francis (Democratic)
- Governor of South Carolina: Pierce Mason Butler (Democratic)
- Governor of Tennessee: Newton Cannon (Whig)
- Governor of Vermont: Silas H. Jennison (Whig)
- Governor of Virginia: Wyndham Robertson (Whig) (until March 31), David Campbell (Democratic) (starting March 31)

=== Lieutenant governors ===
- Lieutenant Governor of Connecticut: Ebenezer Stoddard (Democratic-Republican)
- Lieutenant Governor of Illinois: William H. Davidson (Democratic)
- Lieutenant Governor of Indiana: David Wallace (Whig) (until December 6), David Hillis (Whig) (starting December 6)
- Lieutenant Governor of Kentucky: Charles A. Wickliffe (Democratic-Republican)
- Lieutenant Governor of Massachusetts: George Hull (Whig)
- Lieutenant Governor of Missouri: Franklin Cannon (Democratic)
- Lieutenant Governor of New York: John Tracy (Democratic)
- Lieutenant Governor of Rhode Island: Jeffrey Hazard (political party unknown) (until month and day unknown), Benjamin Babock Thurston (political party unknown) (starting month and day unknown)
- Lieutenant Governor of South Carolina: William DuBose (Democratic)
- Lieutenant Governor of Vermont: David M. Camp (Whig)

== Events ==
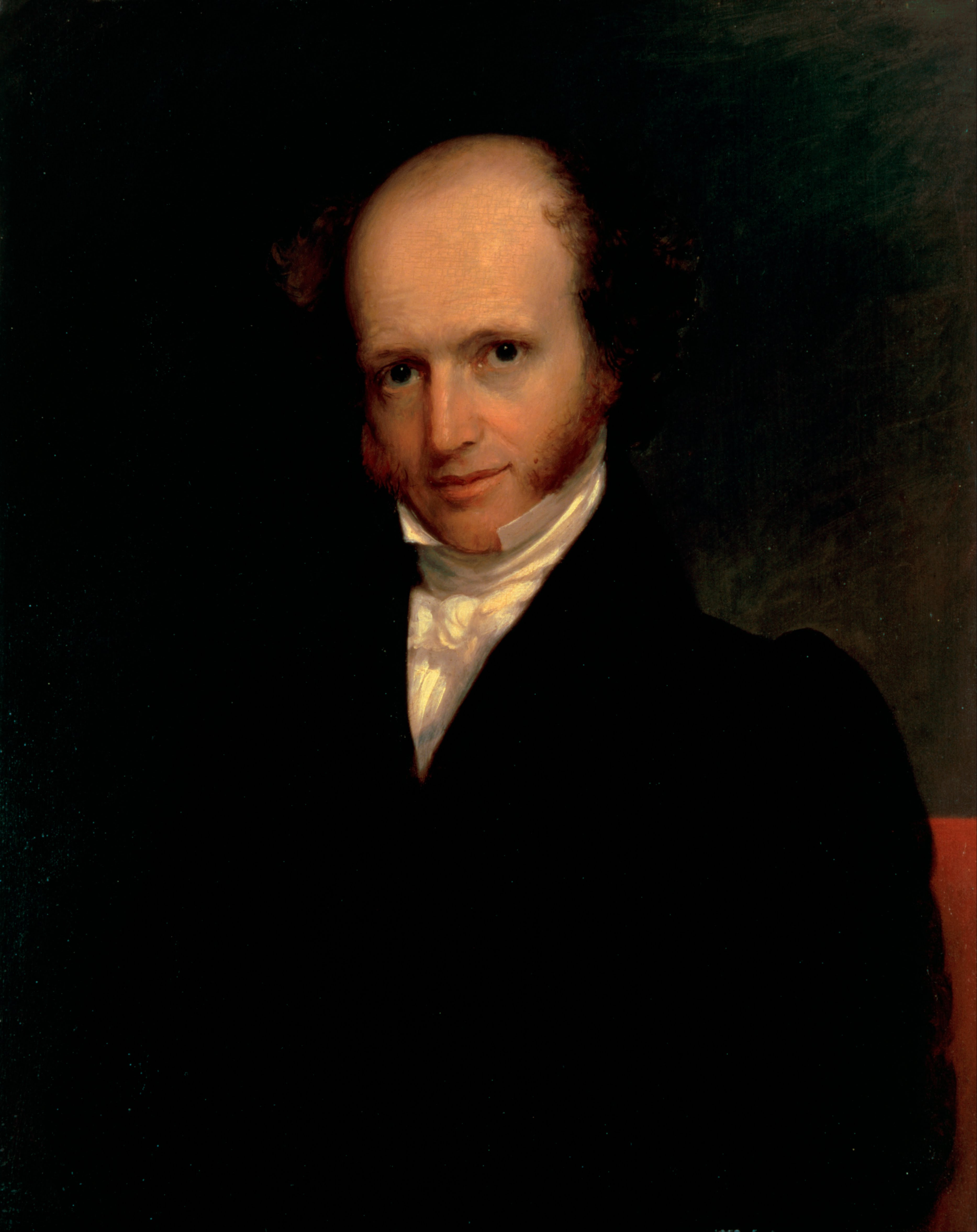
March 4: Martin Van Buren becomes the eighth U.S. president

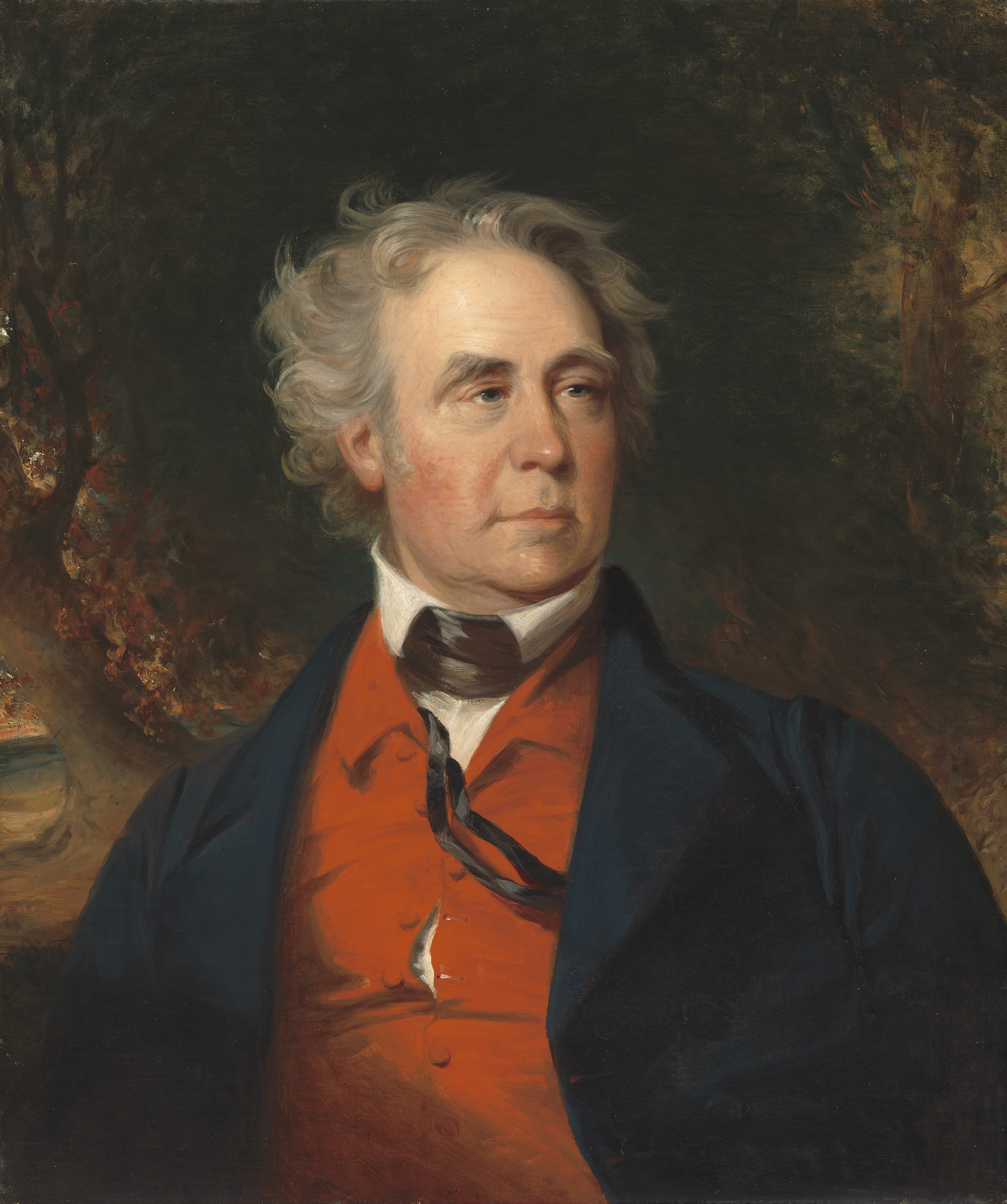
Richard M. Johnson becomes the ninth U.S. vice president

- January 2 – Wreck of the Mexico kills 115 immigrants off the coast of Long Island.
- January 6 – DePauw University founded in Greencastle, Indiana.
- January 26 – Michigan is admitted as the 26th U.S. state (see History of Michigan).
- February 4 – Seminoles attack Fort Foster.
- February 8 – Richard Johnson becomes the only vice president of the United States chosen by the United States Senate.
- February 15 – Knox College founded in Galesburg, Illinois.
- February 16 – Lake County, Indiana, is established by the European Americans.
- February 25
  - In Philadelphia, The Institute for Colored Youth (ICY) is founded as the first institution for the higher education of coloreds.
  - Thomas Davenport obtains the first United States patent on an electric motor.
- March – Victor Séjour's short story "Le Mulâtre", the earliest known work of African American fiction, is published in the French abolitionist journal Revue des Colonies.
- March 4
  - Martin Van Buren is sworn in as the eighth president of the United States, and Richard M. Johnson is sworn in as the ninth vice president.
  - Chicago is granted a city charter by Illinois.
- May 8 – The steamboat Ben Sherod catches fire and explodes on the Mississippi River, killing approximately 175 people.
- May 10 – Panic of 1837: New York City banks fail, and unemployment reaches record levels.
- June 5 – Houston, Texas, is granted a city charter.
- June 11 – The Broad Street Riot occurs in Boston, Massachusetts, fueled by ethnic tensions between the Irish and the Yankees.
- July – Charles W. King sets sail on the American merchant ship Morrison. In the Morrison incident, he is turned away from Japanese ports with cannon fire.
- July 31 – Groundbreaking ceremony for St. Charles College (Louisiana), the first Jesuit college established in the South.
- October – First publication of The United States Magazine and Democratic Review.
- October 21 – General Thomas Jesup captures Seminole leader Osceola under pretext of negotiations.
- October 31 – The steamboat Monmouth disaster on the Mississippi River near Baton Rouge kills over 300 Muscogee and Black slaves who are being transported to the Indian Territory.
- November 7 – In Alton, Illinois, abolitionist printer Elijah P. Lovejoy is shot and killed by a pro-slavery mob while he attempts to protect his printing shop from being destroyed a fourth time.
- November 8 – Mary Lyon founds Mount Holyoke Female Seminary, which will later become Mount Holyoke College.
- John Deere (inventor) begins his agricultural implement manufacturing business, John Deere, in Grand Detour, Illinois.
- The Little, Brown and Company publishing house opens its doors in Boston.
- John Greenleaf Whittier's first poetry book, Poems Written During the Progress of the Abolition Question in the United States, is published by Boston abolitionists.
- Antonija Höffern becomes the first Slovene woman to immigrate to the United States.
- Dorcas Allen kills two of her four children while imprisoned in a District of Columbia slave pen.

=== Ongoing ===
- Second Seminole War (1835–1842)

== Births ==
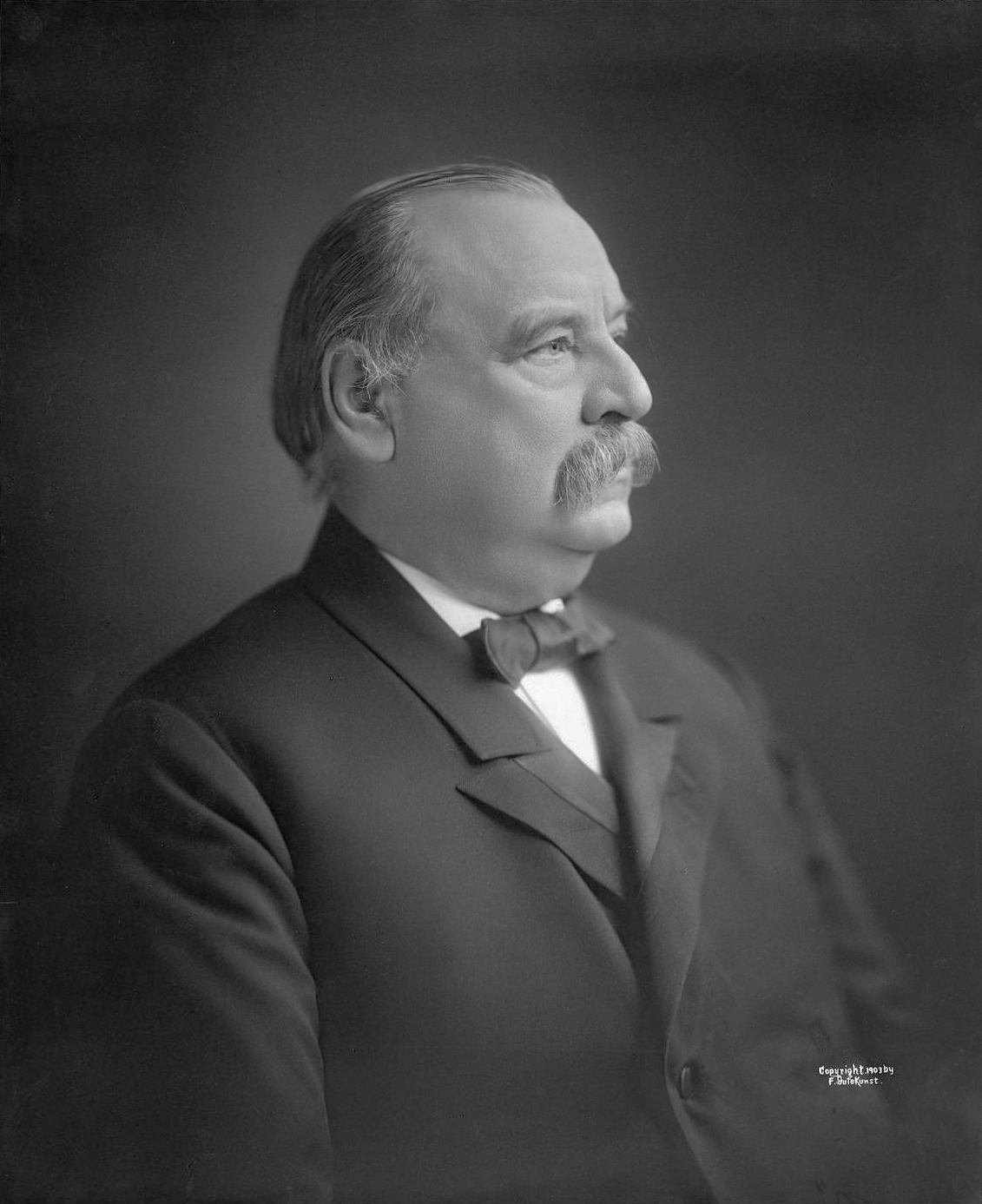
Grover Cleveland

- January 9 – Julius C. Burrows, U.S. Senator from Michigan from 1895 to 1911 (died 1915)
- January 19 – William Williams Keen, brain surgeon (died 1932)
- February 5 – Dwight L. Moody, evangelist (died 1899)
- March 1 – William Dean Howells, writer, historian, editor and politician (died 1920)
- March 7 – Henry Draper, physician and astronomer (died 1882)
- March 18 – Grover Cleveland, 22nd and 24th president of the United States from 1885 to 1889 and 1893 to 1897 (died 1908)
- March 27 – Kate Fox, medium (died 1892)
- April 3 – John Burroughs, nature writer (died 1921)
- April 10 – (Byron) Forceythe Willson, poet (died 1867)
- April 17 – J. P. Morgan, financier (died 1913 in Italy)
  - May 26
  - Mary Frances McCray, church founder, leader and preacher (died 1898)
  - Washington Roebling, civil engineer (died 1926)
- May 27 – James Butler "Wild Bill" Hickok, gunfighter (killed 1876)
- May 28
  - Samuel D. McEnery, U.S. Senator from Louisiana from 1897 to 1910 (died 1910)
  - Tony Pastor, impresario and theater owner (died 1908)
- June 22
  - Paul Morphy, chess player (died 1884)
  - Touch the Clouds, Native American Miniconjou chief 7 feet tall (died 1905)
- June 25 – Charles Yerkes, financier of rapid transit systems in Chicago and London (died 1905)
- July 1 – Henry Rathbone, military officer and diplomat (died 1911 in Germany)
- July 21 – Helen Appo Cook, African American community activist (died 1913)
- July 22 – George N. Bliss, Medal of Honor recipient (died 1928)
- July 31 – William Quantrill, Confederate leader during the American Civil War (died 1865)
- August 30 – Nell Arthur, wife of Chester A. Arthur (died 1880)
- September 2 – James H. Wilson, Union Army general in the Civil War (died 1925)
- September 8
  - Joaquin Miller, born Cincinnatus Heine Miller, "Poet of the Sierras" (died 1913)
  - Raphael Pumpelly, geologist and explorer (died 1923)
- October 10 – Robert Gould Shaw, Union Army general in the Civil War and reformer (killed in action 1863)
- October 12 – Preston B. Plumb, U.S. Senator from Kansas from 1877 to 1891 (died 1891)
- October 29 – Harriet Powers, African American folk artist (died 1910)
- November 3 – John Leary, politician, 37th Mayor of Seattle (died 1905)
- November 20 – Lewis Waterman, inventor and businessman (died 1901)
- November 28 – John Wesley Hyatt, inventor and industrial chemist (died 1920)
- December 10 – Edward Eggleston, novelist and historian (died 1902)
- December 15 – George B. Post, architect (died 1913)
- December 26
  - Morgan Bulkeley, U.S. Senator from Connecticut from 1905 to 1911 (died 1922)
  - George Dewey, U.S. Admiral of the Navy (died 1917)

== Deaths ==
- January 17 – Black Seminole interpreter John Caesar killed during a failed horse raid
- June 29 – Nathaniel Macon, U.S. Senator from North Carolina from 1815 to 1828 (born 1757)
- September 28 – David Barton, U.S. Senator from Missouri from 1821 to 1831 (born 1783)
- October 1 – Robert Clark, politician (born 1777)
- October 9 – Oliver H. Prince, U.S. Senator from Georgia from 1828 to 1829 (born 1787)
- November 7 – Elijah P. Lovejoy, abolitionist (born 1809)
- November 11 – Thomas Green Fessenden, poet (born 1771)
- November 25 – Uchee Billy, chief of the Yuchi
- December 20 – Francis Neale, Jesuit, President of Georgetown College (born 1756)
- Date unknown – Mary Dixon Kies, first American recipient of a U.S. patent (born 1752)

== See also ==
- Timeline of United States history (1820–1859)
