= 1865 in the United States =

- Decades: 1840s; 1850s; 1860s; 1870s; 1880s
- See also: History of the United States (1865–1918); Timeline of United States history (1860–1899); List of years in the United States

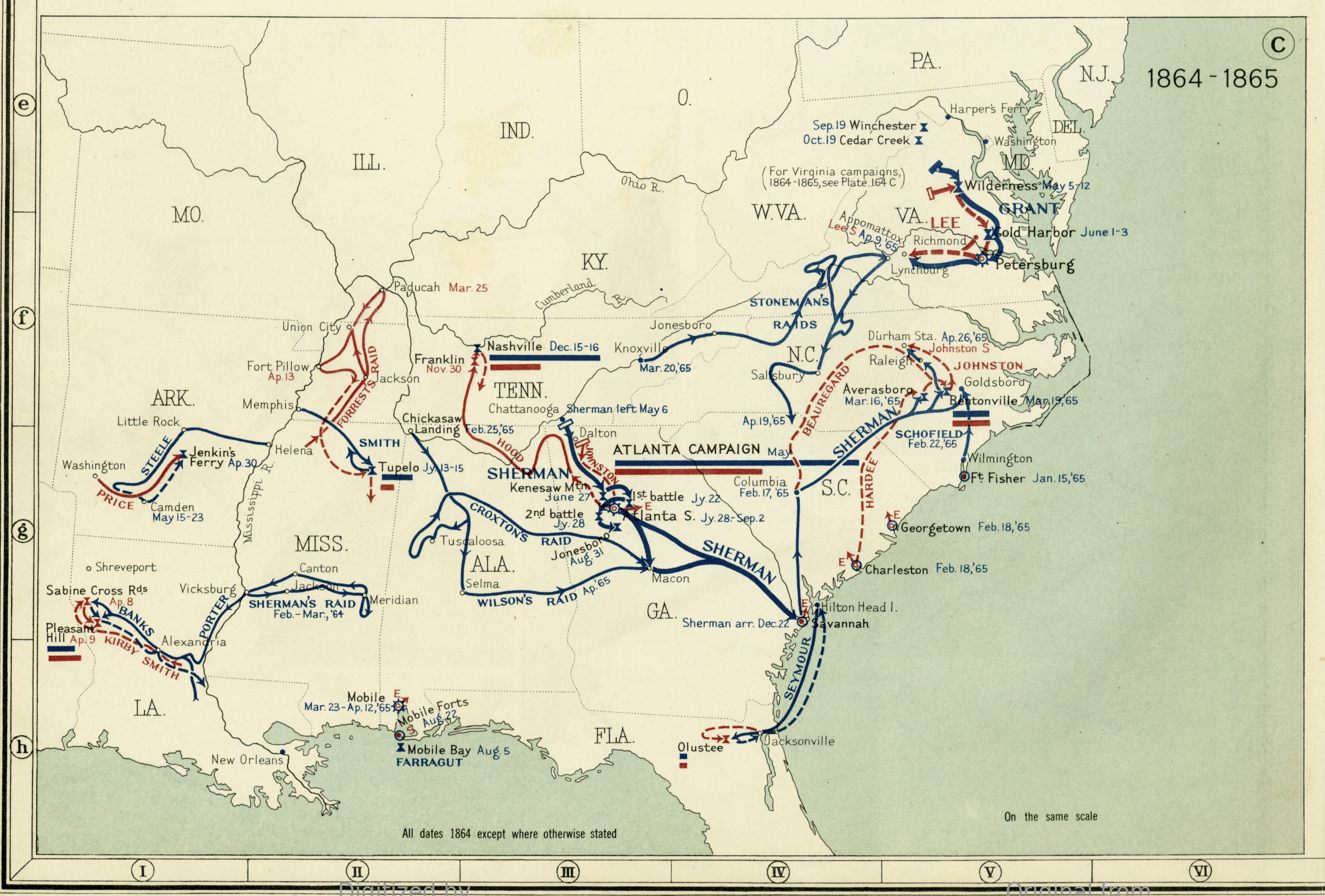
Military operations of the American Civil War in 1864 and 1865

Events from the year 1865 in the United States. The American Civil War ends with the surrender of the Confederate States, beginning the Reconstruction era of U.S. history.

== Incumbents ==
=== Federal government ===
- President:

Abraham Lincoln (R-Illinois) (until April 15)
Andrew Johnson (D-Tennessee) (starting April 15)

- Vice President:

Hannibal Hamlin (R-Maine) (until March 4)
Andrew Johnson (D-Tennessee) (March 4 – April 15)
vacant (starting April 15)

- Chief Justice: Salmon P. Chase (Ohio)
- Speaker of the House of Representatives: Schuyler Colfax (R-Indiana)
- Congress: 38th (until March 4), 39th (starting March 4)

==== State governments ====
Governors and lieutenant governors

=== Governors ===
- Governor of Alabama:
  - until May 1: Thomas H. Watts (Democratic)
  - May 1-June 21: vacant
  - June 21-December 13: Lewis E. Parsons (Republican)
  - starting December 13: Robert M. Patton (Democratic)
- Governor of Arkansas: Harris Flanagin (Democratic) (until May 26), Isaac Murphy (Democratic) (starting May 26)
- Governor of California: Frederick Low (Republican)
- Governor of Connecticut: William A. Buckingham (Republican)
- Governor of Delaware: William Cannon (Republican) (until March 1), Gove Saulsbury (Democratic) (starting March 1)
- Governor of Florida:
  - until April 1: John Milton (Democratic)
  - April 1-May 19: Abraham K. Allison (Democratic)
  - May 19-July 13: vacant
  - July 13-December 20: William Marvin (Provisional)
  - starting December 20: David S. Walker (Democratic)
- Governor of Georgia:
  - until June 17: Joseph E. Brown (Democratic)
  - June 17-December 14: James Johnson (Democratic)
  - starting December 14: Charles J. Jenkins (Democratic)
- Governor of Illinois: Richard Yates (Republican) (until January 16), Richard J. Oglesby (Republican) (starting January 16)
- Governor of Indiana: Oliver P. Morton (Republican)
- Governor of Iowa: William M. Stone (Republican)
- Governor of Kansas: Thomas Carney (Republican) (until January 9), Samuel J. Crawford (Republican) (starting January 9)
- Governor of Kentucky: Thomas E. Bramlette (Democratic)
- Governor of Louisiana: Henry Watkins Allen (Democratic) (until June 2), James Madison Wells (Republican) (starting March 4)
- Governor of Maine: Samuel Cony (Republican)
- Governor of Maryland: Augustus Bradford (Union)
- Governor of Massachusetts: John Albion Andrew (Republican)
- Governor of Michigan: Austin Blair (Republican) (until January 3), Henry H. Crapo (Republican) (starting January 3)
- Governor of Minnesota: Stephen Miller (Republican)
- Governor of Mississippi:
  - until May 22: Charles Clark (Democratic)
  - May 22-June 13: vacant
  - June 13-October 16: William L. Sharkey (Provisional)
  - starting October 16: Benjamin G. Humphreys (Democratic)
- Governor of Missouri: William Preble Hall (Republican) (until January 2), Thomas Clement Fletcher (Republican) (starting January 2)
- Governor of Nevada: Henry G. Blasdel (Republican)
- Governor of New Hampshire: Joseph A. Gilmore (Republican) (until June 8), Frederick Smyth (Republican) (starting June 8)
- Governor of New Jersey: Joel Parker (Democratic)
- Governor of New York: Reuben Fenton (Republican) (starting January 1)
- Governor of North Carolina:
  - until May 29: Zebulon Baird Vance (Conservative)
  - May 29-December 15: William Woods Holden (Republican)
  - starting December 15: Jonathan Worth (Conservative)
- Governor of Ohio: John Brough (Republican) (until August 29), Charles Anderson (Republican) (starting August 29)
- Governor of Oregon: A. C. Gibbs (Republican)
- Governor of Pennsylvania: Andrew Gregg Curtin (Republican)
- Governor of Rhode Island: James Y. Smith (Republican)
- Governor of South Carolina:
  - until May 25: Andrew Gordon Magrath (Democratic)
  - May 25-June 30: vacant
  - June 30-November 29: Benjamin Franklin Perry (Democratic)
  - starting November 29: James Lawrence Orr (Democratic)
- Governor of Tennessee:
  - until March 4: Andrew Johnson (Union)
  - March 4-April 5: Edward H. East (Republican)
  - starting April 5: William G. Brownlow (Republican)
- Governor of Texas: Pendleton Murrah (Democratic) (until June 17), Andrew J. Hamilton (Democratic) (starting June 17)
- Governor of Vermont: J. Gregory Smith (Republican) (until October 13), Paul Dillingham (Republican) (starting October 13)
- Governor of Virginia: William Smith (Democratic) (until May 9), Francis Harrison Pierpont (Republican) (starting May 9)
- Governor of West Virginia: Arthur I. Boreman (Republican)
- Governor of Wisconsin: James T. Lewis (Republican)

=== Lieutenant governors ===
- Lieutenant Governor of Arkansas: Calvin C. Bliss (Republican)
- Lieutenant Governor of California: Tim N. Machin (Republican)
- Lieutenant Governor of Connecticut: Roger Averill (Republican)
- Lieutenant Governor of Florida: William W. J. Kelly (Republican) (starting month and day unknown)
- Lieutenant Governor of Illinois: Francis Hoffmann (Republican) (until January 16), William Bross (Republican) (starting January 16)
- Lieutenant Governor of Indiana: Paris C. Dunning (Democratic) (until January 9), Conrad Baker (Republican) (starting January 9)
- Lieutenant Governor of Iowa: Enoch W. Eastman (Republican)
- Lieutenant Governor of Kansas: Thomas Andrew Osborn (Republican) (until January 9), James McGrew (Republican) (starting January 9)
- Lieutenant Governor of Kentucky: vacant
- Lieutenant Governor of Louisiana: Benjamin W. Pearce (Democratic) (until March 4), Albert Voorhies (Republican) (starting March 4)
- Lieutenant Governor of Maryland: Christopher C. Cox (Union)
- Lieutenant Governor of Massachusetts: Joel Hayden (political party unknown)
- Lieutenant Governor of Michigan: Charles S. May (Republican) (until month and day unknown), Ebenezer O. Grosvenor (Republican) (starting month and day unknown)
- Lieutenant Governor of Minnesota: Charles D. Sherwood (Republican)
- Lieutenant Governor of Missouri: vacant (until January 2), George Smith (Republican) (starting January 2)
- Lieutenant Governor of Nevada: John S. Crosman (political party unknown)
- Lieutenant Governor of New York: Thomas G. Alvord (Republican) (starting January 1)
- Lieutenant Governor of Ohio: Charles Anderson (Republican) (until August 29), vacant (starting August 29)
- Lieutenant Governor of Rhode Island: Seth Padelford (Republican) (until month and day unknown), Duncan Pell (political party unknown) (starting month and day unknown)
- Lieutenant Governor of South Carolina:
  - until May 25: Robert McCaw (Democratic)
  - May 25-November 30: vacant
  - starting November 30: W. D. Porter (Democratic)
- Lieutenant Governor of Texas: Fletcher Stockdale (Democratic) (until June 17), vacant (starting June 17)
- Lieutenant Governor of Vermont: Paul Dillingham (Republican) (until October 13), Abraham B. Gardner (Republican) (starting October 13)
- Lieutenant Governor of Virginia: Samuel Price (Democratic) (until month and day unknown), Leopold Copeland Parker Cowper (Whig) (starting month and day unknown)
- Lieutenant Governor of Wisconsin: Wyman Spooner (Republican)

== Events ==
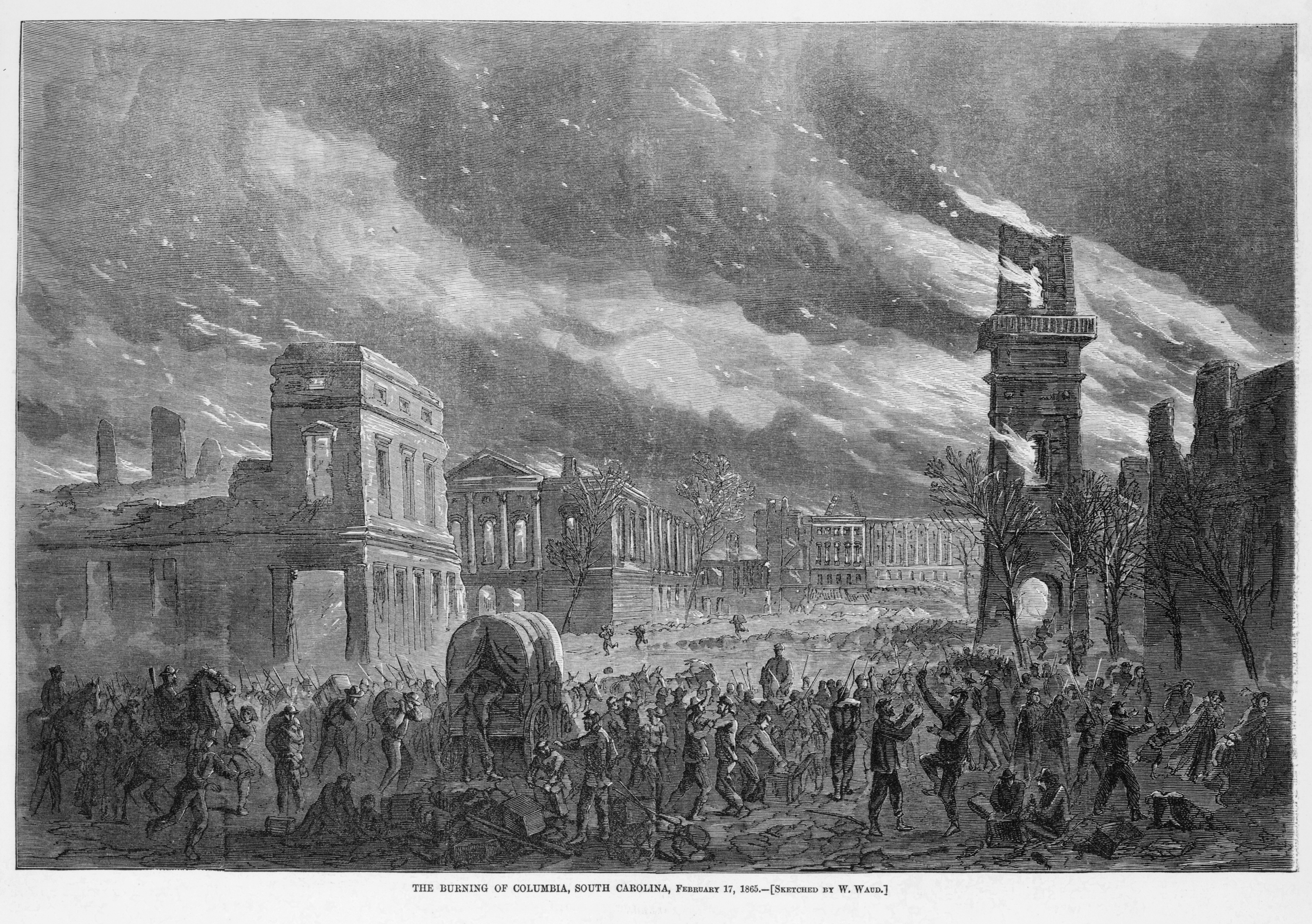
February 17: Columbia, South Carolina burns

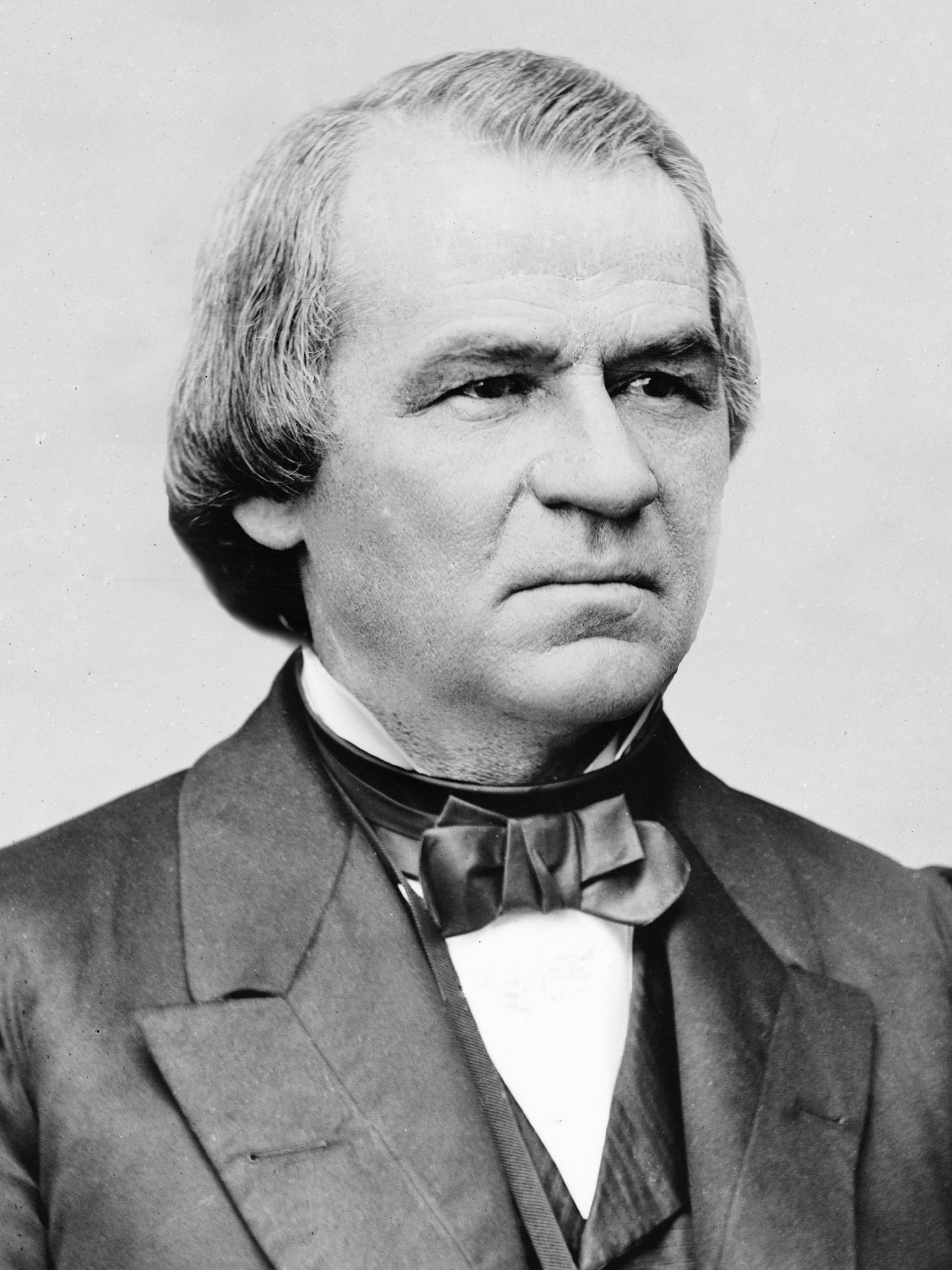
March 4: Andrew Johnson becomes the 16th U.S. vice president

=== January–March ===
- January 13 – American Civil War: The Second Battle of Fort Fisher begins when United States forces launch a major amphibious assault against the Confederate stronghold of Fort Fisher, North Carolina.
- January 15 – American Civil War: United States forces capture Fort Fisher.
- January 25 – A major fire at the Smithsonian Institution destroys a large part of the collection, including most of Charles Bird King's Native American portraits.
- January 27 – American Civil War: Troop-transport steamship Eclipse explodes, killing 38.
- January 31 – American Civil War: Confederate General Robert E. Lee becomes general-in-chief.
- February 17 – American Civil War: Columbia, South Carolina burns as Confederate forces flee from advancing Union forces.
- March 3 – The U.S. Congress authorizes formation of the Freedmen's Bureau.
- March 4 – Andrew Johnson looks and sounds drunk as he is sworn in as Vice President of the United States. President Abraham Lincoln begins his second term with the second inaugural address.
- March 13 – American Civil War: The Confederate States of America agrees to the use of African American troops.
- March 18 – American Civil War: The Congress of the Confederate States of America adjourns for the last time.
- March 19 – American Civil War: The Battle of Bentonville begins; by the end of the battle on March 21 the Confederate forces retreat from Four Oaks, North Carolina.
- March 21 – The University of Kansas was founded when the Board of Regents held its first meeting.
- March 25
  - American Civil War: In Virginia, Confederate forces capture Fort Stedman from the Union. Lee's army suffers heavy casualties during the Battle of Fort Stedman—about 2,900, including 1,000 captured in the Union counterattack. Confederate positions are weakened. After the battle, Lee's defeat is only a matter of time.
  - The "Claywater Meteorite" explodes just before reaching ground level in Vernon County, Wisconsin; fragments having a combined mass of 1.5 kg are recovered.

=== April–June ===
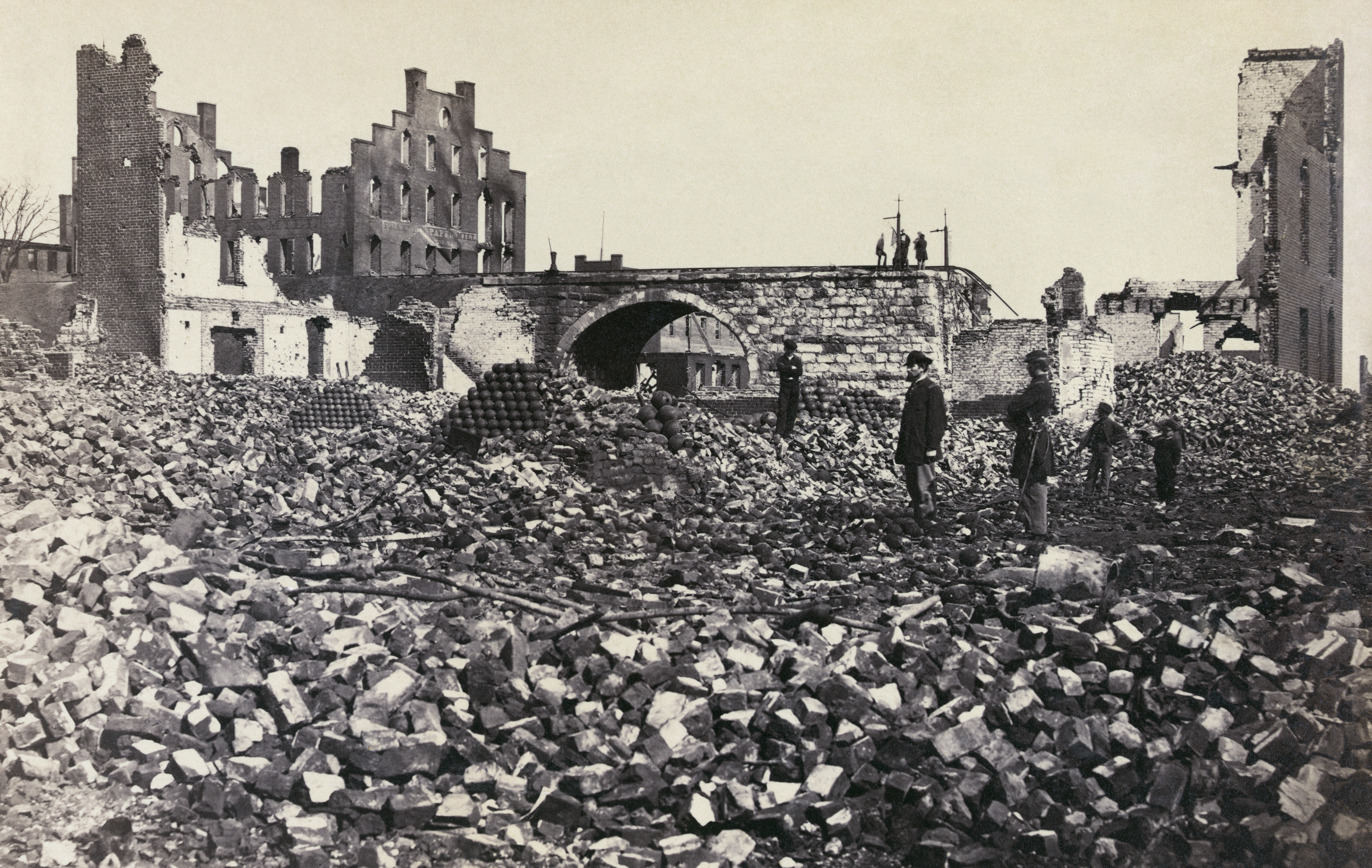
Fires in Richmond, Virginia, burn out of control in the largely abandoned city after Evacuation Sunday (April 2)

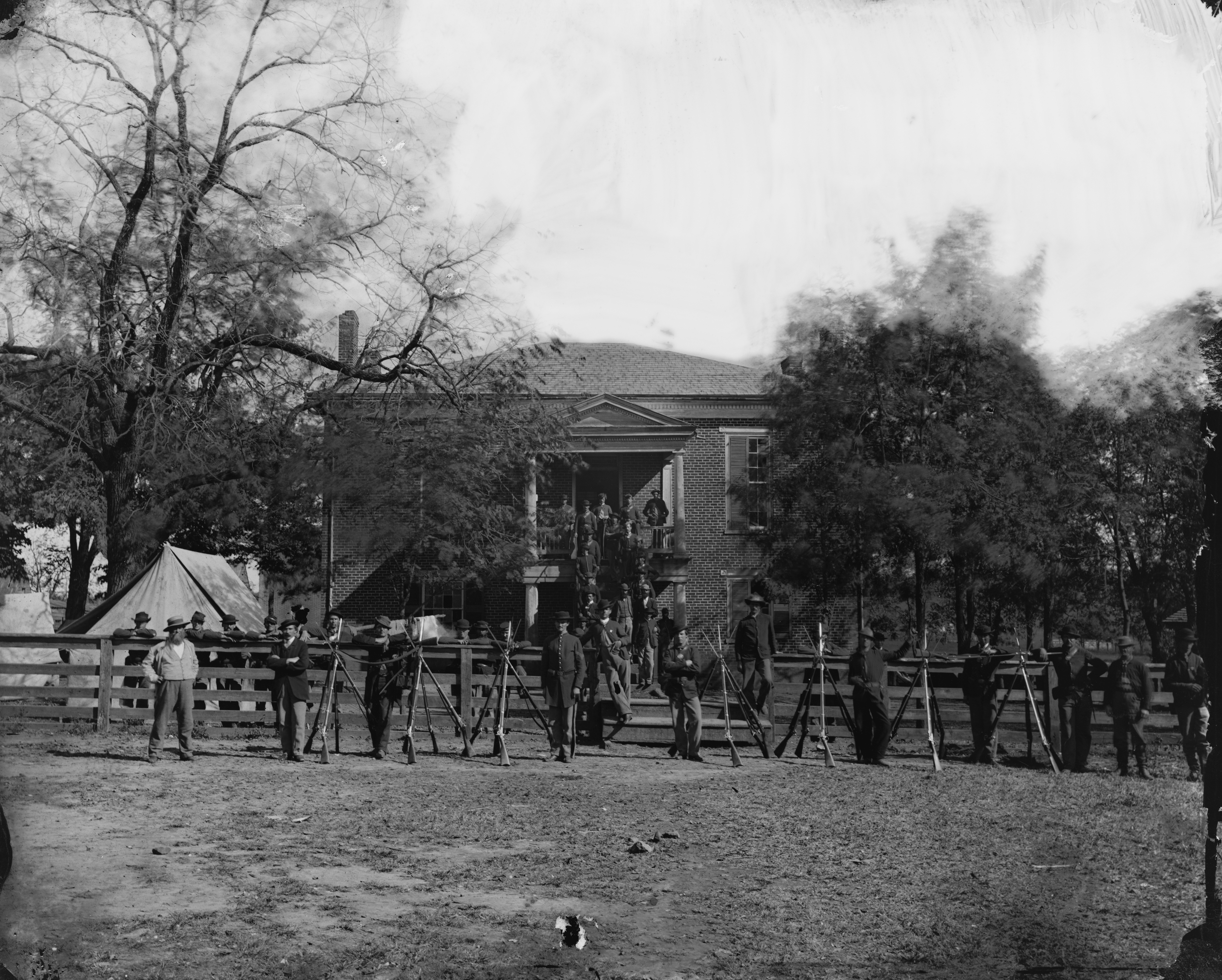
April 9: Robert E. Lee surrenders

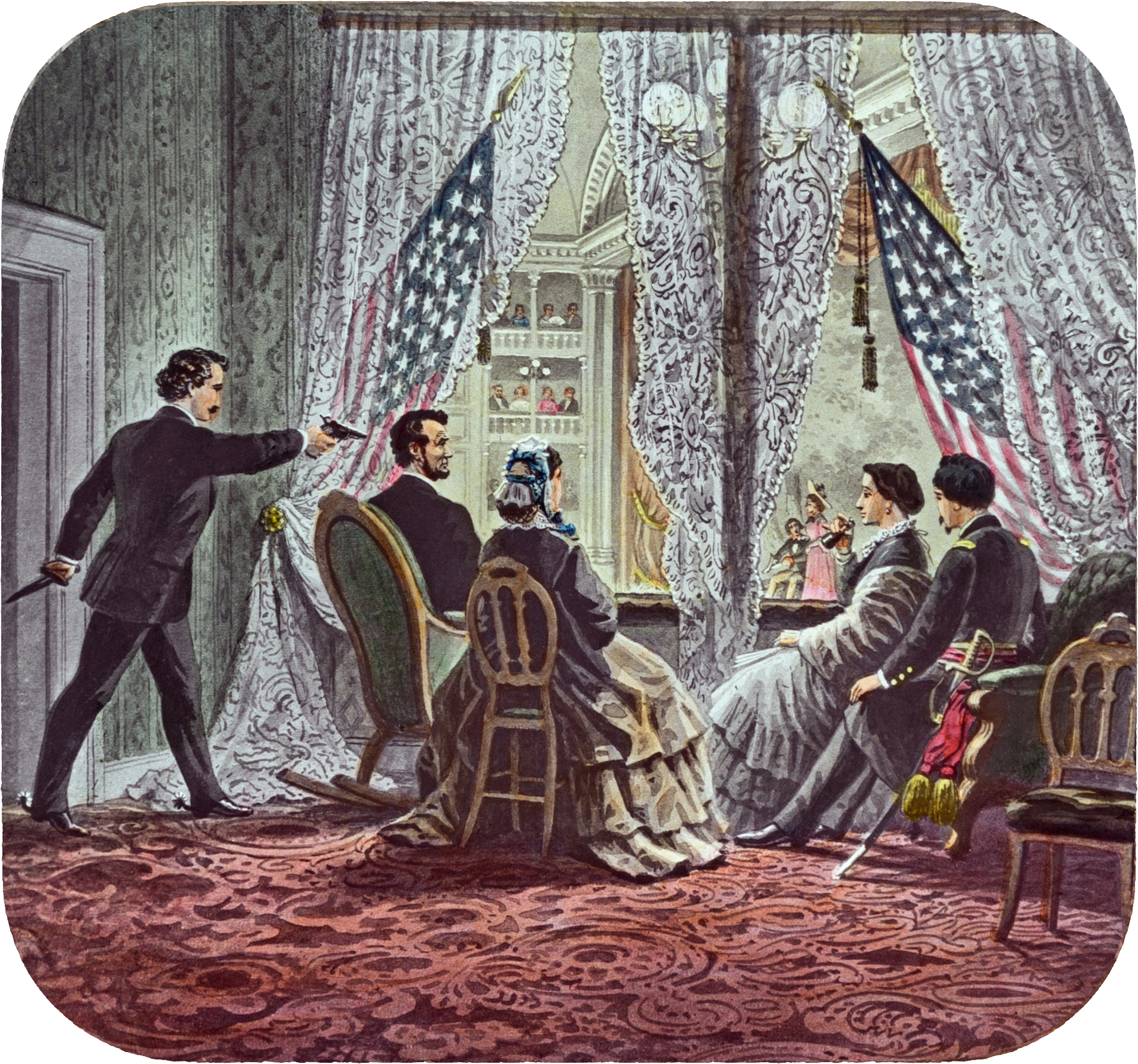
April 14: Lincoln assassinated

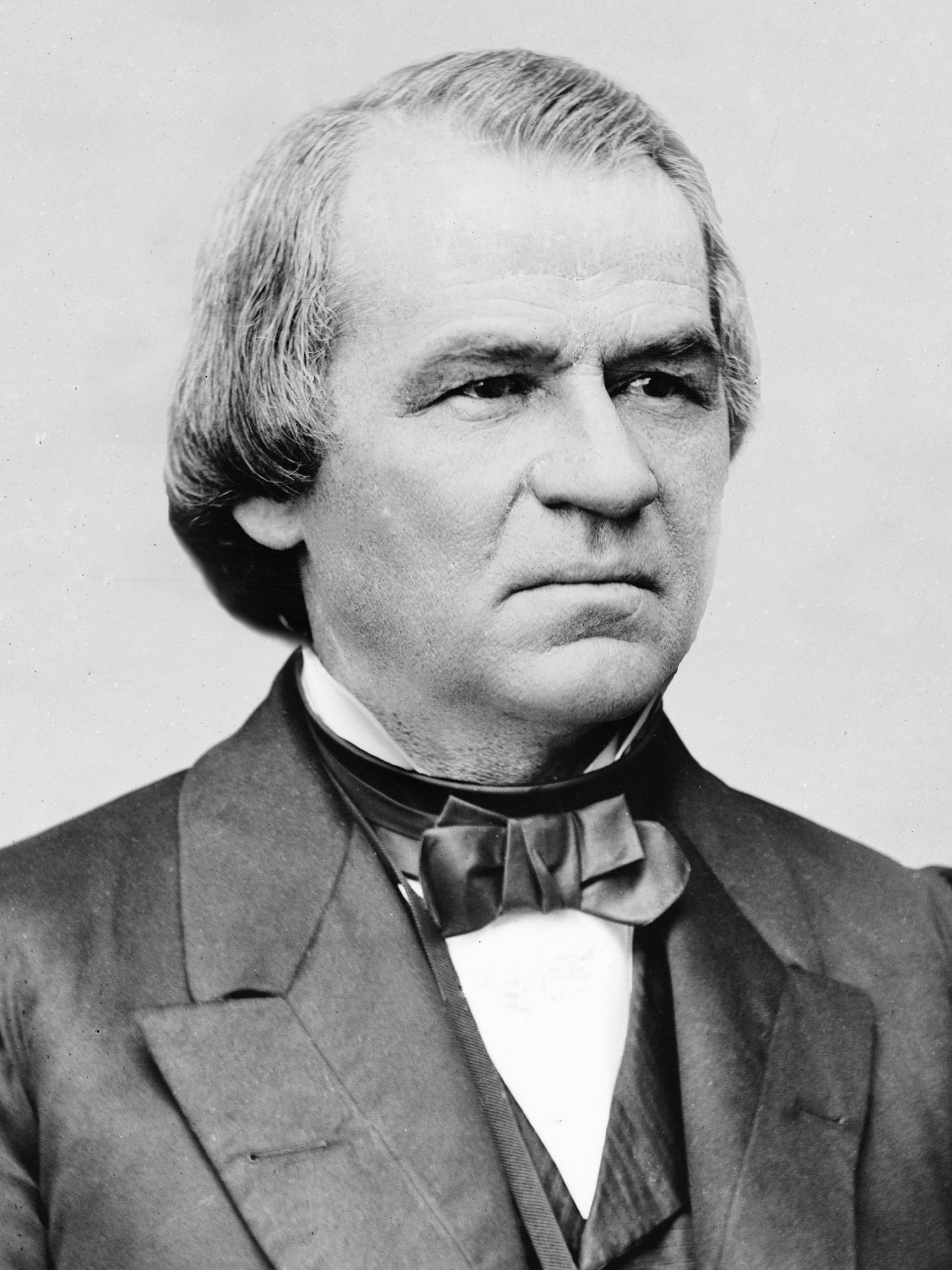
April 15: Johnson succeeds Lincoln as the 17th U.S. president

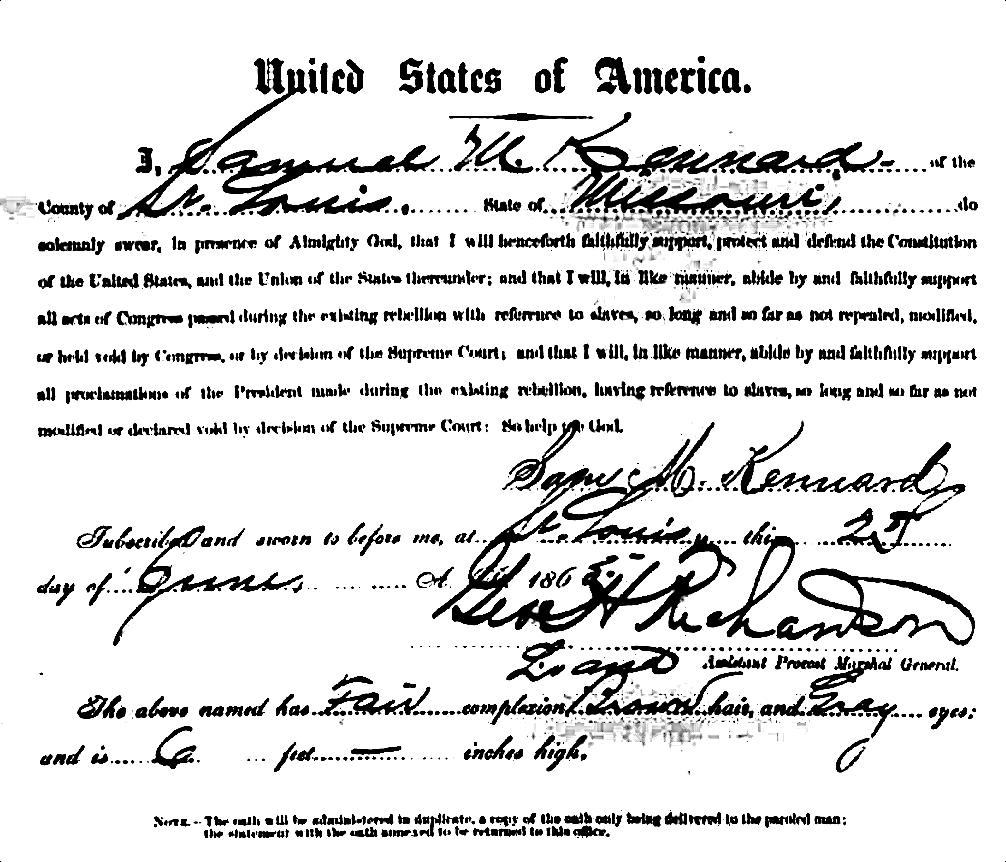
Oath to defend the Constitution of the United States and, among other promises, to "abide by and faithfully support all acts of Congress passed during the . . . rebellion having reference to slaves . . . ," signed by Samuel M. Kennard on June 27, 1865

- April 1 – American Civil War: Battle of Five Forks – In Petersburg, Virginia, Confederate General Robert E. Lee begins his final offensive.
- April 2 – American Civil War: "Evacuation Sunday" – Confederate President Jefferson Davis and most of his cabinet flee the Confederate capital of Richmond, Virginia, which is taken by Union troops the next day.
- April 3 – American Civil War: Richmond is captured by Union forces under General Ulysses S. Grant.
- April 9 – American Civil War: General Robert E. Lee surrenders to Grant at Appomattox Court House, effectively ending the Civil War.
- April 14 (Good Friday)
  - Assassination of Abraham Lincoln: Actor and Confederate sympathizer John Wilkes Booth shoots and mortally wounds U.S. President Abraham Lincoln while Lincoln is attending an evening performance of the farce Our American Cousin at Ford's Theatre in Washington, D.C.
  - U.S. Secretary of State William H. Seward and his family are attacked in his home by Lewis Powell.
- April 15 – President Lincoln dies of his gunshot wound early this morning and Vice President Andrew Johnson becomes the 17th president of the United States.
- April 18 – Confederate President Jefferson Davis and his entire cabinet arrive in Charlotte with a contingent of 1,000 soldiers.
- April 26
  - American Civil War: Confederate States Army General Joseph E. Johnston surrenders to Union Army Major General William Tecumseh Sherman at Durham Station, North Carolina.
  - Union cavalry corner John Wilkes Booth in a Virginia barn, and cavalryman Boston Corbett fatally shoots the assassin.
- April 27
  - The steamboat Sultana, carrying 2,300 passengers (and news of Lincoln's assassination), explodes and sinks in the Mississippi River, killing 1,800, mostly Union survivors of the Andersonville Prison.
  - Governor of New York Reuben Fenton signs a bill formally creating Cornell University.
- April 28 – University Club of New York incorporated.
- May 3 – Thomas H. Watts is arrested and removed as the 18th governor of Alabama.
- May 4 – American Civil War: Lieutenant General Richard Taylor, commanding all Confederate forces in Alabama, Mississippi, and eastern Louisiana, surrenders his forces to Union General Edward Canby at Citronelle, Alabama, effectively ending all Confederate resistance east of the Mississippi.
- May 5
  - Jefferson Davis meets with his Confederate Cabinet (14 officials) for the last time, in Washington, Georgia, and the Confederate Government is officially dissolved.
  - In North Bend, Ohio (a suburb of Cincinnati), the first train robbery in the United States takes place.
- May 10
  - American Civil War: Jefferson Davis is captured by Union troops near Irwinville, Georgia.
  - Worcester Polytechnic Institute is founded in Massachusetts.
- May 12–13 – American Civil War: Battle of Palmito Ranch – In far south Texas, more than a month after Confederate General Lee's surrender, the last land battle of the Civil War with casualties ends with a Confederate victory.
- May 23 – Grand Review of the Armies: Union Army troops parade down Pennsylvania Avenue (Washington, D.C.) to celebrate the end of the Civil War.
- May 25 – Mobile magazine explosion: 300 are killed in Mobile, Alabama when an ordnance depot explodes.
- May 26 – Indigenous tribes who have supported the Confederate States of America hold the Camp Napoleon Council in Indian Territory (modern-day Oklahoma).
- June 2 – American Civil War: Confederate forces west of the Mississippi under General Edmund Kirby Smith surrender at Galveston, Texas under terms negotiated on May 26, becoming the last to do so.
- June 19 – American Civil War: Union Major General Gordon Granger lands at Galveston and informs the people of Texas of the Emancipation Proclamation (an event celebrated in modern times each year as Juneteenth).
- June 21 – Lewis E. Parsons is appointed by Andrew Johnson as the 19th governor of Alabama.
- June 23 – American Civil War: At Fort Towson in Indian Territory, Confederate General Stand Watie, a Cherokee Indian, surrenders the last significant Confederate army.

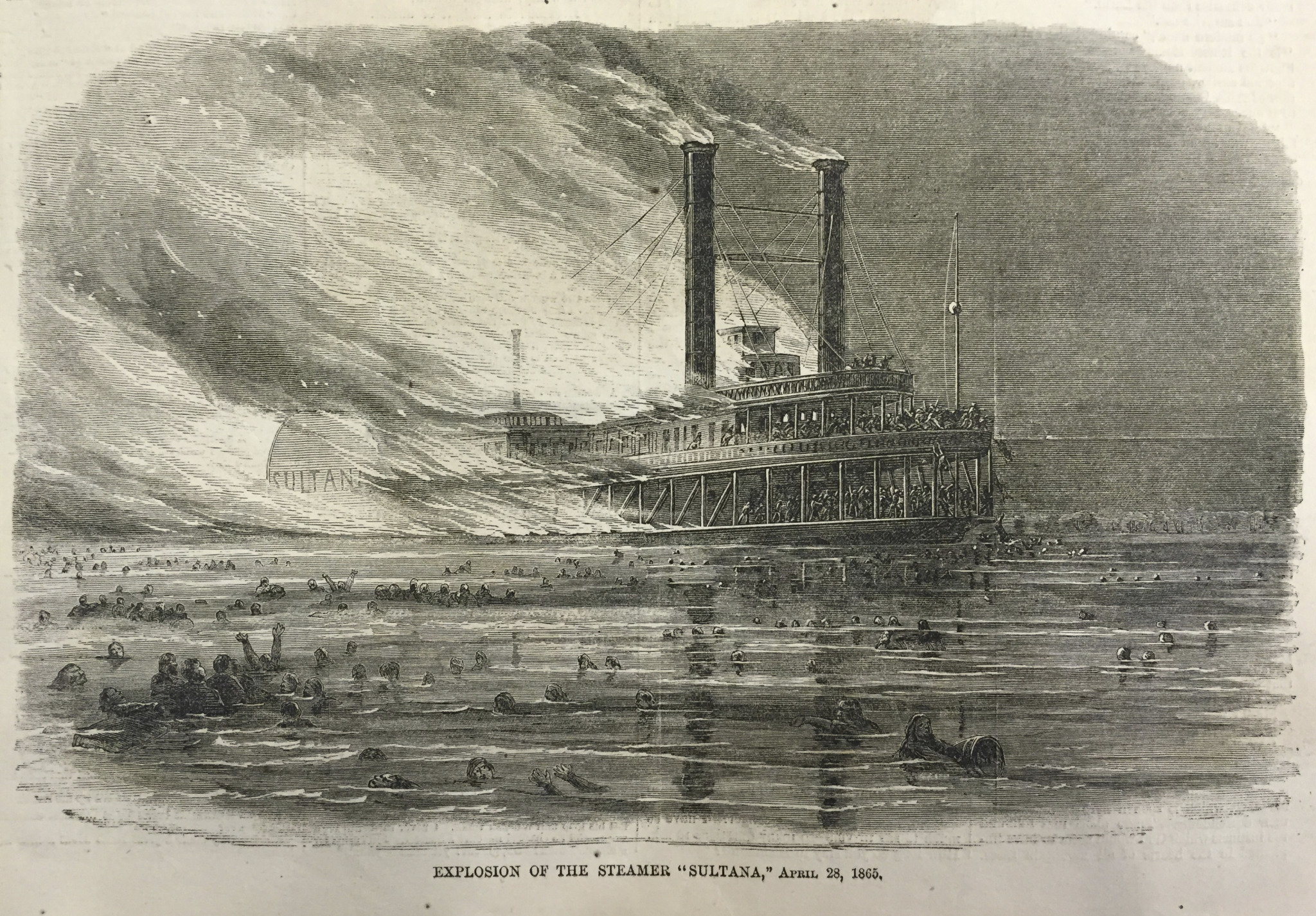
April 27: Sultana burns

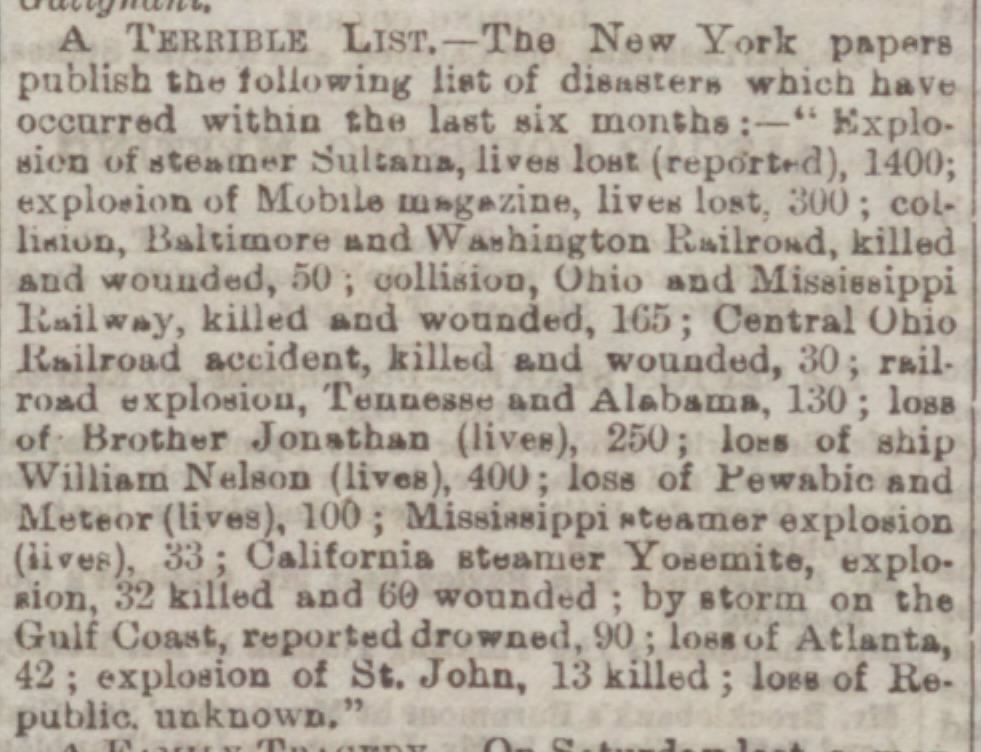
"A Terrible List", Liverpool Mercury, November 17, 1865

=== July–September ===
- July 5 – The U.S. Secret Service is founded.
- July 6 – The Nation political magazine begins publication.
- July 7 – Following the assassination of Abraham Lincoln on April 14, the 4 conspirators condemned to death during the trial are hanged: David Herold, George Atzerodt, Lewis Powell and Mary Surratt. Her son, John Surratt, escapes execution by fleeing to Canada, and ultimately to Egypt. She is the first woman executed by federal authorities, and the last until 1953.
- July 21 – Wild Bill Hickok – Davis Tutt shootout: In the market square of Springfield, Missouri, Wild Bill Hickok shoots Little Dave Tutt dead over a poker debt in what is regarded as the first true western "fast draw" showdown.
- July 30 – The paddle steamer Brother Jonathan sinks off the California coast, killing 225.
- September 26 – Champ Ferguson becomes the first of two combatants to be convicted of war crimes for actions taken during the American Civil War, found guilty by a U.S. Army tribunal on 23 charges arising from the murder of 53 people as a Confederate guerilla. He is hanged on October 20, two days after the conviction of Henry Wirz.

=== October–December ===
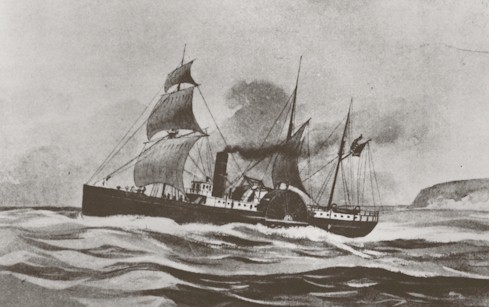
July 30: Brother Jonathan sinks

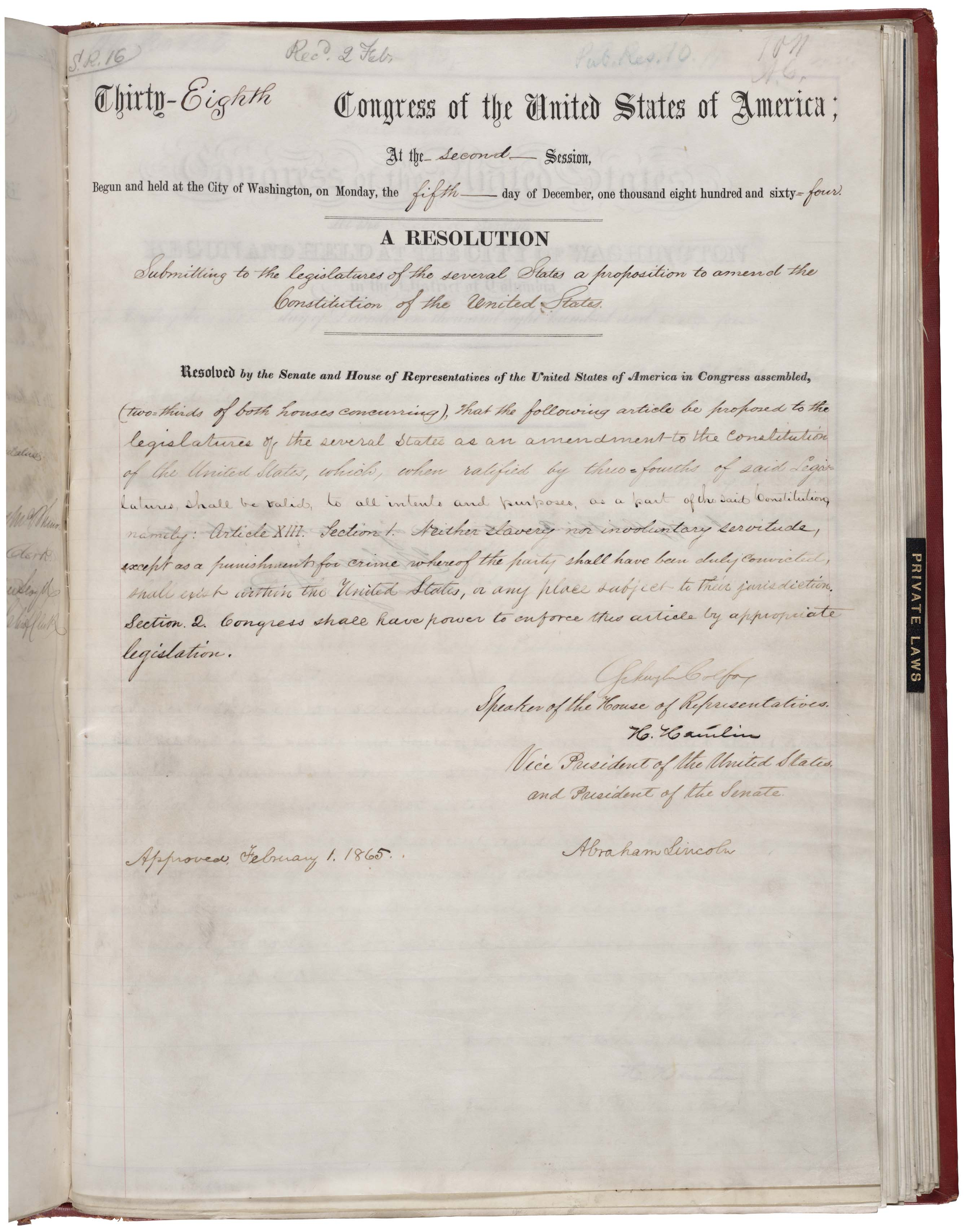
Thirteenth Amendment to the United States Constitution

- September 8–21 – Fort Smith Council between U. S. and Native American tribes that had supported the Confederated States of America regarding Reconstruction Treaties.
- October 8 – The 6.3 M_{la} Santa Cruz Mountains earthquake shakes the Central Coast and San Francisco Bay Area of California with a maximum Mercalli intensity of VIII (Severe), causing $500,000 in damage.
- October 25 – The paddlewheel steamer SS Republic sinks off the Georgia coast, with a cargo of $400,000 in coins.
- November 6 – American Civil War: Surrender to the British at Liverpool of the commerce raider CSS Shenandoah (Captain James Waddell), the last significant organized Confederate unit.
- November 10 – Captain Henry Wirz, Confederate superintendent of Andersonville Prison (Camp Sumter) is hanged, becoming the second of two combatants, and only serving regular soldier, to be executed for war crimes committed during the American Civil War.
- November 18 – Mark Twain's story "The Celebrated Jumping Frog of Calaveras County" is published in the New York weekly The Saturday Press in its original version as "Jim Smiley and His Jumping Frog".
- December 11 – The U.S. Congress creates the House Appropriations Committee and the Committee on Banking and Commerce, reducing the tasks of the Committee on Ways and Means.
- December 13 – Robert M. Patton is sworn in as the 20th governor of Alabama replacing Lewis E. Parsons.
- December 18 – The Thirteenth Amendment to the United States Constitution (which abolished slavery and involuntary servitude, except as punishment for a crime) is declared ratified by three-quarters of the states of the United States.
- December 21 – The Kappa Alpha Order, a social fraternity, is founded at Washington and Lee University.
- December 24 – The Ku Klux Klan is formed by six Confederate Army veterans, with support of the Democratic Party, in Pulaski, Tennessee, to resist Reconstruction and intimidate "carpetbaggers" and "scalawags", as well as to repress the freed slaves.

=== Undated ===
- A forest fire near Silverton, Oregon destroys about one million acres (4,000 km^{2}) of timber.

=== Ongoing ===
- American Civil War (1861–1865)
- Reconstruction era (1865–1877)

== Births ==
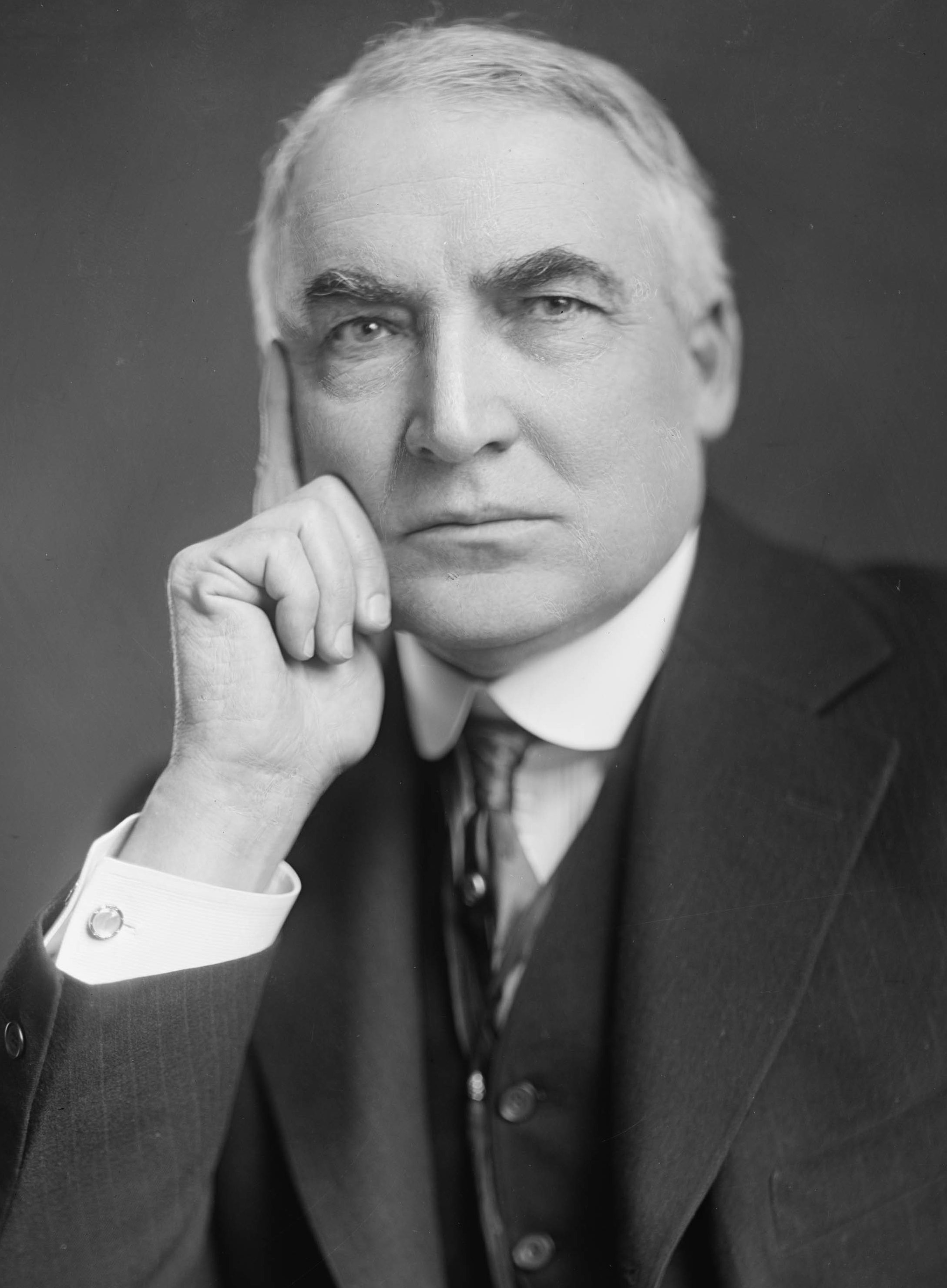
Warren G. Harding

- January 5 – Johnson N. Camden Jr., U.S. Senator from Kentucky from 1914 to 1915 (died 1942)
- January 10 – Mary Ingalls, blind older sister of author Laura Ingalls Wilder (died 1928)
- January 11 – Willie Franklin Pruitt, poet and activist (died 1947)
- January 28 – Verina Morton Jones, African American physician, suffragist and clubwoman (died 1943)
- February 1 – Henry Luke Bolley, plant pathologist (died 1956)
- March 19 – William Morton Wheeler, entomologist (died 1937)
- March 31 – Georgiana Simpson, African American philologist (died 1944)
- April 6 – Victory Bateman, stage and silent screen actress (died 1926)
- April 28 – Charles W. Woodworth, entomologist (died 1940)
- May 2 – Clyde Fitch, dramatist (died 1909)
- May 3 – Henry Francis Bryan, governor of American Samoa (died 1944)
- May 5 – Helen Maud Merrill, litterateur and poet (died 1943)
- May 25 – John Mott, YMCA leader, recipient of the Nobel Peace Prize (died 1955)
- May 26 – Robert W. Chambers, artist (died 1933)
- June 5 – Charles Stanton Ogle, actor (died 1940)
- June 25 – Robert Henri, painter, leader of the Ash Can School (died 1929)
- June 28 – Alice May Douglas, author (died 1943)
- June 29 – William Borah, U.S. Senator from Idaho from 1907 to 1940 (died 1940)
- July 14 – Arthur Capper, U.S. Senator from Kansas from 1919 to 1949 (died 1951)
- August 2 – Irving Babbitt, literary critic (died 1933)
- August 27
  - James Henry Breasted, Egyptologist (died 1935)
  - Charles G. Dawes, 30th vice president of the United States from 1925 to 1929, recipient of the Nobel Peace Prize (died 1951)
- September 24 – Mollie McConnell, actress (died 1920)
- September 27 – Ezra Fitch, businessman, co-founder of Abercrombie & Fitch (died 1930)
- October 14 – Mary Margaret O'Reilly, assistant director of the United States Mint (died 1949)
- October 15 – Charles W. Clark, baritone (died 1925)
- October 17 – James Rudolph Garfield, politician (died 1950)
- October 22 – Raymond Hitchcock, actor (died 1929)
- October 26 – Benjamin Guggenheim, businessman (died 1912)
- November 2 – Warren G. Harding, 29th president of the United States from 1921 until 1923 (died 1923)
- December 6 – Victor Blue, admiral (died 1928)
- December 19 – Minnie Maddern Fiske, stage actress (died 1932)
- December 20 – Elsie de Wolfe, socialite and interior decorator (died 1950)
- December 25 – Fay Templeton, singer and actress (died 1939)

== Deaths ==
- March 10 – Amy Spain, slave, hanged (born c.1848)
- April 2 – A. P. Hill, Confederate general killed in the American Civil War (born 1825)
- April 15 – Abraham Lincoln, 16th president of the United States from 1861 to 1865 (born 1809)
- April 23 – Silas Soule, American abolitionist and U.S. Army officer who refused to participate in the Sand Creek Massacre (born 1838)
- April 26 – John Wilkes Booth, actor and assassin of Abraham Lincoln (born 1838)
- May 20 – William K. Sebastian, U.S. Senator from Arkansas from 1848 to 1861 (born 1812)
- May 21 – Jeremiah Clemens, U.S. Senator from Alabama from 1849 to 1853 (born 1814)
- July 6 – William Quantrill, Confederate leader during the American Civil War (born 1837)
- June 10 – Mrs Lydia Sigourney, the "Sweet Singer of Hartford", poet (born 1791)
- June 23 – Samuel Francis Du Pont, rear admiral (born 1803)
- July 7
  - George Atzerodt, conspirator with John Wilkes Booth, assigned to assassinate Vice President Andrew Johnson (born 1835)
  - David Herold, conspirator with John Wilkes Booth (born 1842)
  - Lewis Powell, conspirator with John Wilkes Booth, attempted assassin of William H. Seward (born 1844)
  - Mary Surratt, conspirator with John Wilkes Booth, first woman executed by American federal government (born either 1820 or 1823)
- August 25 – John Drew, Cherokee Confederate colonel of the First Mounted Cherokee Regiment (born 1796 in the Cherokee Nation East)
- November 29 – Isaac A. Van Amburgh, animal trainer (born 1811)
- December 16 – Philip Allen, U.S. Senator from Rhode Island from 1853 to 1859 (born 1785)

== See also ==
- Timeline of United States history (1860–1899)
