= Governor Noble =

Governor Noble may refer to:

- Noah Noble (1794–1844), 5th Governor of Indiana
- Patrick Noble (1787–1840), 57th Governor of South Carolina
