= Thomas De Lage Sumter =

American soldier and politician (1809–1874)

Member of the U.S. House of Representatives from South Carolina's 8th district
- In office March 4, 1839 – March 3, 1843
- Preceded by: John Peter Richardson II
- Succeeded by: District eliminated

Personal details
- Born: November 14, 1809 Germantown, Philadelphia, Pennsylvania
- Died: July 2, 1874 (aged 64) Stateburg, South Carolina
- Party: Democratic
- Education: U.S. Military Academy
- Profession: Surveyor, planter

Military service
- Allegiance: United States of America
- Branch/service: United States Army
- Rank: Colonel
- Battles/wars: Second Seminole War

Thomas De Lage Sumter (November 14, 1809 – July 2, 1874) was a U.S. representative from South Carolina, and a grandson of American Revolutionary War General Thomas Sumter.

== Early life ==
Sumter was born in Pennsylvania, in the Germantown area of Philadelphia. As a young child, Sumter moved to South Carolina with his family, and attended the common schools at Edgehill, near Stateburg, South Carolina. He graduated in 1835 from the United States Military Academy at West Point, New York.

Sumter's father, Thomas Sumter Jr., served in Rio de Janeiro from 1810 to 1819 as the United States Ambassador to the Portuguese Court during its exile to Brazil. His mother, Natalie De Lage Sumter (née Nathalie de Lage de Volude), was a daughter of French nobility, sent by her parents to America for her safety during the French Revolution. She was raised in New York City from 1794 to 1801 by Vice President Aaron Burr as his ward, alongside his own daughter Theodosia.

== Career ==
Upon graduation, Sumter entered the United States Army as a first lieutenant. He served from 1835 until 1841, during the Second Seminole War, and attained the rank of colonel.

Sumter returned to Stateburg, South Carolina, where he was elected as a Democrat to the Twenty-sixth and Twenty-seventh Congresses, serving from March 4, 1839, to March 3, 1843. Serving in South Carolina's 8th congressional district, he was the last individual to hold that seat, which was eliminated in 1843 as a result of the 1840 census.

Sumter engaged in teaching, surveying and agricultural pursuits. He was connected to the fledgling South Carolina Railroad Company as an agent.

== Death ==
Sumter died on his plantation, "South Mount," near Stateburg, on July 2, 1874, and was interred in the private burial ground on his estate.

U.S. House of Representatives
Preceded by John Peter Richardson II	Member of the U.S. House of Representatives from South Carolina's 8th congressional district 1839–1843	Succeeded by District eliminated
