= Amy Spain =

Executed American slave (c. 1848–1865)

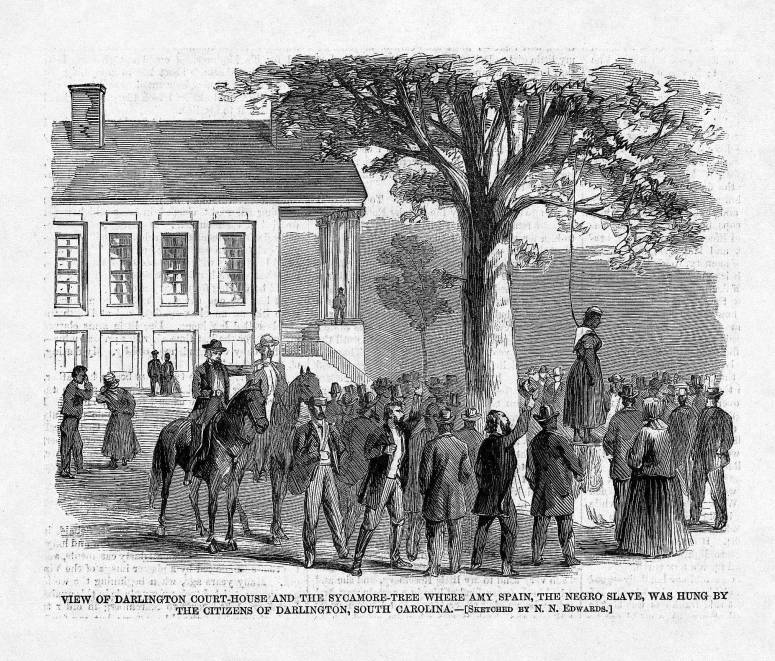
- The Hanging of Amy Spain – contemporary engraving from Harper's Bazaar
- Born: 1848
- Died: March 10, 1865 (aged 16–17); Darlington, South Carolina, U.S.
- Status: Executed by hanging
- Convictions: Treason; Conduct unbecoming a slave
- Penalty: Death

Amy Spain (c. 1848 – March 10, 1865) was a teenage American slave who was executed by a Confederate military court in the final days of the American Civil War. She was convicted of treason for stealing from her owner, and hanged from a sycamore tree in Darlington, South Carolina. She is believed to have been the last female slave to be executed in what is now the United States.

== Background ==
Spain was owned by Major Albertus C. Spain, a Mexican–American War veteran who owned a large property in Darlington, South Carolina, and had been a member of the South Carolina Secession Convention. She was about 17 years old at the time of her death, and was referred to as "mulatto", with sources noting her light skin.

In early 1865, a detachment of the Union Army arrived in Darlington as part of the Carolinas campaign. Spain reputedly exclaimed "bless the Lord, the Yankees have come!" Many white residents (including almost all adult men) had deserted the town by that point, and the Union commander allowed slaves to take whatever belongings had been left behind. Spain and her brother Willie dragged some mahogany furniture from an abandoned warehouse, and later took "linens, sheets, pillow cases, flour, sugar, lard, and some furniture" from the home of their master.

== Trial and execution ==
The Union Army soon moved on from Darlington, and its residents returned. A short time later Confederate troops (led by General Joseph Wheeler) re-occupied the town. Those who had stayed behind during the Union occupation reported that Spain had been the "ringleader" of the looting, and accused her specifically of guiding Union troops to places where valuables had been hidden. Spain was captured and charged with "treason and conduct unbecoming a slave" by a Confederate military tribunal; Major Spain reputedly acted as her defense counsel. She was sentenced to death, and hanged from a sycamore tree in the Darlington town square on March 10, 1865.

== Aftermath ==
The September 30, 1865, edition of Harper's Weekly gave a somewhat embellished account of Spain's execution, proclaiming that "her name is now hallowed among the Africans". The story and its accompanying illustration were reprinted by many Northern newspapers. Harper's Weekly attributed the greater share of responsibility to Darlington's residents rather than the Confederate troops, stating that her execution "was acquiesced in and witnessed by most of the citizens of the town". In response, the Darlington New Era accused Harper's of committing "a wholesale slander upon our community", and said the town had made "every effort [...] to reverse the decision of the court".

Major Spain was interviewed by the same newspaper, and said "Amy's temper was hot, hasty, and ungovernable, yet to me, as her master, she was always dutiful up to the unfortunate time when she exhibited traits of character, adopted a line of conduct, used expressions, and committed acts which contributed to the violent termination of her existence at the early age of seventeen".
