= John Peter Richardson II =

American politician

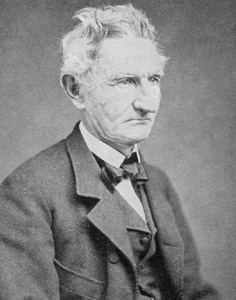

59th Governor of South Carolina
- In office December 9, 1840 – December 8, 1842
- Lieutenant: William K. Clowney
- Preceded by: Barnabas Kelet Henagan
- Succeeded by: James Henry Hammond

Member of the United States House of Representatives from South Carolina's 8th district
- In office December 19, 1836 – March 3, 1839
- Preceded by: Richard Irvine Manning I
- Succeeded by: Thomas De Lage Sumter

Member of the South Carolina Senate from Clarendon District
- In office November 24, 1834 – December 19, 1836
- Preceded by: Richard Irvine Manning I
- Succeeded by: David St. Pierre DuBose

Member of the South Carolina House of Representatives from Clarendon District
- In office November 28, 1825 – November 24, 1834; Alongside Swepson Cox, William Smith, William Rose, William R. Burgess
- Preceded by: Richard Irvine Manning I
- Succeeded by: David St. Pierre DuBose

Personal details
- Born: April 14, 1801 Clarendon County, South Carolina, United States
- Died: January 24, 1864 (aged 62) Fulton, South Carolina, Confederate States
- Party: Democratic
- Spouse: Juliania Augusta Manning Richardson
- Parent(s): John Peter Richardson; Floride Bonneau Peyre

John Peter Richardson II (April 14, 1801 – January 24, 1864) was the 59th governor of South Carolina from 1840 to 1842.

== Early life and career ==
Richardson was a son of John Peter Richardson and Floride Bonneau Peyre, and a grandson of General Richard Richardson of the American Revolution. He was born on Hickory Hill Plantation in St. James Santee Parish in Clarendon County.

Richardson was educated at Moses Waddel's School in Willington. He graduated from South Carolina College in 1819 and practiced law upon passing the bar. At the age of 24, Richardson was elected to the South Carolina House of Representatives in 1825 and was known as a Unionist during the Nullification Crisis of the early 1830s.

He was elevated to the South Carolina Senate in 1834 and won a seat in Congress as a Jacksonian for the 8th district after the death of Richard Irvine Manning I in 1836. Running as a Democrat, Richardson won re-election for a full term to the Twenty-fifth Congress.

== As Governor ==
By the late 1830s, South Carolina's political leaders grew increasingly anxious about the prospects of the Whigs taking control of the federal government and enacting high tariffs. The only option that they felt available to them was the reconciliation of the factions in South Carolina and to put up a united opposition through the Democratic Party. John C. Calhoun, Robert Rhett and Franklin H. Elmore led the effort to unite the Unionists and the Secessionists and one measure undertaken to reunite the factions was the election of Richardson as Governor of South Carolina in 1840. Nonetheless, extreme secessionists opposed a Unionist being governor and James Henry Hammond entered the gubernatorial race to oppose Richardson. The South Carolina General Assembly followed the lead of Calhoun to end the infighting and Richardson was elected governor.

Richardson's term as governor was marked by the Bank of South Carolina refusing to adopt new banking regulations and the enactment of the Tariff of 1842 by the federal government. He promoted the establishment of the South Carolina Military Academy in Charleston because he felt that the militia of the state should be well educated and trained.

== Later life ==
Upon leaving the governorship in 1842, Richardson remained active in politics by participating at the Southern Convention of 1850, the Southern Rights Convention of 1852 and he signed the Ordinance of Secession at the Secession Convention of 1860. He died in Fulton, South Carolina on January 24, 1864 (about a year before the dissolution of the Confederate States), and was buried at the Richardson Cemetery on Hickory Hill Plantation.

U.S. House of Representatives
Preceded by Richard Irvine Manning I	Member of the U.S. House of Representatives from South Carolina's 8th congressional district 1836–1839	Succeeded by Thomas De Lage Sumter
Political offices
Preceded by Barnabas Kelet Henagan	Governor of South Carolina; 1840–1842	Succeeded by James Henry Hammond
