= George C. Magoun =

- Born: August 25, 1840; Cambridge, Massachusetts
- Died: December 20, 1893 (aged 53)

George C. Magoun (August 25, 1840 – December 20, 1893) was, in the late 1880s, the Chairman of the Board of the Atchison, Topeka and Santa Fe Railway.

Magoun was born in Cambridge, Massachusetts. He received a public school education, then entered employment with Stimson, Valentine and Company, a paint manufacturer in Boston. He left his sales position with that firm in March 1867 to become a clerk for Kidder, Peabody & Co. After a quick series of promotions, the company sent him to New York City where he would open a branch. Four years later, in 1871, he was a full partner in the firm.

Magoun and his company invested in the still growing Atchison, Topeka and Santa Fe Railway to the point where he had become Chairman of the Board for the railroad. In the late 1880s, as the Santa Fe's stock prices fell from $140 per share to around $20 per share, Magoun's health also faltered. Magoun died on December 20, 1893. He had become so personally identified with the railroad that three days after his death, the Santa Fe entered receivership.
