= I. P. Durfee =

American politician

Member of the Minnesota Senate from the 38th district
- In office January 13, 1876 – January 7, 1878
- Preceded by: Everett P. Freeman
- Succeeded by: Pierce J. Kniss

Personal details
- Born: January 27, 1838 Rhode Island, U.S.
- Died: May 6, 1916 (aged 78) Saint Paul, Minnesota, U.S.
- Occupation: Farmer, legislator

Isaac P. Durfee (January 27, 1838 – May 6, 1916) was a Minnesota State Senator in the 38th district. Durfee was born in Rhode Island in January 1838 and received at least an elementary school education from Rhode Island Common Schools. He moved to Minnesota in 1872 and served as a county commissioner for Nobles County until October 12, 1875. He was a farmer in Worthington, Minnesota when he was elected to the Minnesota State Senate on November 2, 1875. George S. Thompson won the election; however, Durfee contested the election and was given the seat. He served Cottonwood, Jackson, Martin, Murray, Nobles, Pipestone, Rock, and Watonwan counties for 2 years. He was preceded by Everett P. Freeman and succeeded by Pierce J. Kniss.
