= Samuel Hall (politician) =

American politician

8th Lieutenant Governor of Indiana
- In office December 9, 1840 – December 6, 1843
- Governor: Samuel Bigger
- Preceded by: David Hillis
- Succeeded by: Jesse D. Bright

Personal details
- Party: Whig

Samuel Hall (June 1, 1797 – May 11, 1862) was an American lawyer, judge, and politician who served as the eighth Lieutenant Governor of Indiana from 1840 to 1843.

Hall was born in Somerset County, Maryland. He was the son of John A. and Elizabeth (Ward) Hall. The family moved to Kentucky in 1805. In 1814, Samuel Hall moved to Gibson County, Indiana. He also resided in Logansport. In 1820, Hall was admitted to the bar and began practicing law. From 1826 to 1827, Hall was a member of the Indiana University Board of Visitors. Hall helped to found the Princeton Female Academy in Princeton in 1838.

A Whig, Hall served in the Indiana House of Representatives from 1829 to 1831 and then again from 1845 to 1846 (during this second term he served as chairman of the House's judiciary committee). Hall served as judge of Indiana's 4th Circuit Court. From 1836 to 1837, he served on the State Board of Internal Improvements. From 1840 to 1843, Hall served as Lieutenant Governor under Governor Samuel Bigger. In 1850, Hall served as a delegate to the state constitutional convention. In 1854, Hall ran for a seat in the U.S. House of Representatives but was defeated.

In 1821, Hall married Elizabeth Prince, who died in 1843. In 1844, Hall remarried to Sophia Augusta Ames.

Hall died in 1862.
