= Mary Frances McCray =

Methodist minister (1837–1898)

Mary Frances 'Fannie' McCray (26 May 1837–1898) was a Christian preacher in Ohio. She was a leader in the African Methodist Episcopal (A.M.E.) Church and founded two churches.

She was born Mary Frances Taylor on May 26, 1837, in Goshen Kentucky. She was born into slavery, and at the death of her owner, Polly Adams, Adams' will stipulated that she was to be granted freedom and the funds to purchase land in Ohio. As was common at the time, the will was contested, but Polly Adams' relatives were not able to overturn it, and the Taylor family bought a farm in Mercer County in 1862.

She married S. J. McCray in 1868 and they had two sons, Edward and Prince. By this time they were both devout Christians and both became leaders in the AME church. In 1883 they moved to De Smet, South Dakota and founded a Free Methodist Church; in 1891 they moved back to Lima, Ohio and founded the First Holiness Church of Lima.

After her death, her husband and son wrote and published a biography of her life. In her biography her husband portrayed McCray as a multifaceted Christian woman. Her life serves as an example of the power and the influence of religion during the time of enslavement and after.
