= Helen Maud Merrill =

American poet

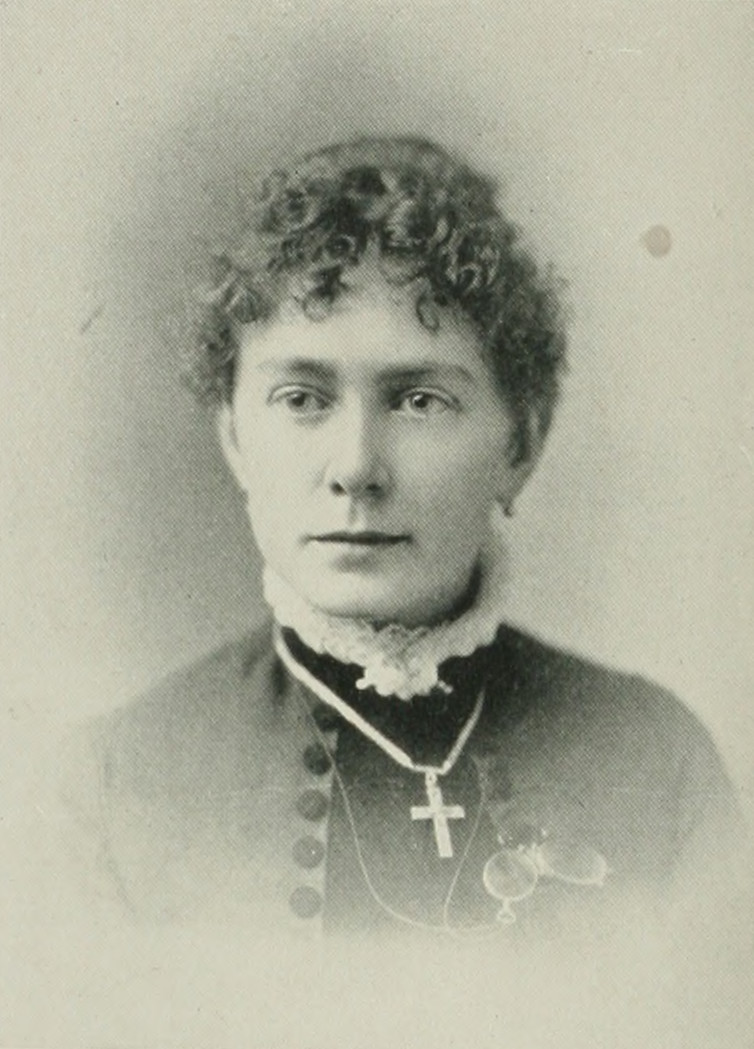
- Photo in A Woman of the Century
- Born: May 5, 1865; Bangor, Maine
- Died: unknown
- Occupations: litterateur, poet
- Writing career
- Pen name: Samantha Spriggins
- Notable work: "The Angel in the Stone"

Helen Maud Merrill (pen name, Samantha Spriggins; May 5, 1865 – unknown) was an American litterateur and poet from Maine. Her first published poem was in the Waterville Sentinel, in 1882. During the decade of 1882–1892, Merrill contributed numerous poems to the St. Nicholas Magazine, Portland Transcript, the Gospel Banner and other journals. She also engaged in editorial work.

== Biography ==
Helen Maud Merrill was born in Bangor, Maine, May 5, 1865. From 1881 to 1887, she lived in Bucksport, Maine. Delicate in her childhood, she was cared for by her mother.

In 1889, Merrill removed to Portland, Maine. There, she soon became connected with several literary associations. Early on, she showed a talent for composition, and from 1882, she was a contributor, both in prose and verse, to the newspaper press. Her humorous sketches over the pen name "Samantha Spriggins" had extensive reading. In 1885, she wrote a poem on the death of Gen. Ulysses S. Grant, which was forwarded to his widow, and a grateful acknowledgment was received by the author in return. Her memorial odes and songs written for the anniversaries of the Grand Army of the Republic were appreciated. In Poets of Maine, she received honorable mention, and "The Angel in the Stone" was selected for insertion as a demonstration of her versification style.
