= Barnabas Kelet Henagan =

American politician

Barnabas Kelet Hanagan

Secretary of State of South Carolina
- In office December 2, 1846 – December 7, 1850
- Governor: David Johnson; Whitemarsh B. Seabrook
- Preceded by: Robert Q. Pinckney
- Succeeded by: Benjamin Perry

Member of the South Carolina Senate from Marion District
- In office November 25, 1844 – December 2, 1846
- Preceded by: Benjamin Gause
- Succeeded by: Robert Harllee

58th Governor of South Carolina
- In office April 7, 1840 – December 9, 1840
- Lieutenant: None
- Preceded by: Patrick Noble
- Succeeded by: John Peter Richardson II

38th Lieutenant Governor of South Carolina
- In office December 7, 1838 – April 7, 1840
- Governor: Patrick Noble
- Preceded by: William DuBose
- Succeeded by: William K. Clowney

Member of the South Carolina Senate from Marlboro District
- In office November 24, 1834 – November 26, 1838
- Preceded by: Robert Blair Campbell
- Succeeded by: Daniel C. Murdoch

Personal details
- Born: June 7, 1798 Marlboro District
- Died: January 10, 1855 (aged 56) Charleston, South Carolina
- Resting place: Rogers Cemetery, Marlboro County, South Carolina
- Education: Heidelberg University
- Profession: physician, planter

Barnabas Kelet Henagan (June 7, 1798 – January 10, 1855) was a medical doctor and South Carolina politician who became the 58th governor of South Carolina due to the death of Patrick Noble on April 7, 1840.

== Early life and career ==
Henagan was born in Marlboro District on June 7, 1798, to Darby and Drusilla Henegan. He was educated at the academies in Marlboro County and he went on to study medicine at the University of Heidelberg in Germany. Afterwards he returned to South Carolina to practice medicine and also engaged in planting. In 1826, he became the president of the Brownsville Minerva Academy.

== Political career ==
Henagan won election to the South Carolina Senate in 1834 and was elected by the General Assembly to be the 38th lieutenant governor of South Carolina in 1838. In the final year of his term, Governor Patrick Noble died on April 7, 1840, and Henagan assumed the governorship. His term as governor lasted less than a year, but Henagan deplored to the Legislature the poor condition of the public schools in the state and the corruption of the electoral process. After leaving office in 1840, Henagan was reelected to the state Senate in 1844 and served as the Secretary of State from 1846 to 1850.

== Later life ==
Henagan died on January 10, 1855, in Charleston and was buried at Rogers Cemetery in Marlboro County.

Political offices
Preceded by William DuBose	Lieutenant Governor of South Carolina; 1838–1840	Succeeded by William K. Clowney
Preceded by Patrick Noble	Governor of South Carolina; 1840	Succeeded by John Peter Richardson II
