= William DuBose (politician) =

American politician

William DuBose (born 1786 or 1787, St. Stephen's Parish (modern Berkeley County, South Carolina); died near Pineville, South Carolina, February 24, 1855) was an American plantation owner, lawyer, and politician who served as the 37th lieutenant governor of South Carolina from 1836 to 1838.

== Life ==
DuBose was the son of Dr. Samuel DuBose (1758-1811) and Elizabeth Sinkler. The DuBoses were a Huguenot family which had arrived early in the settlement of South Carolina and become prominent. DuBose was educated at a school in Newport, Rhode Island and then at Yale, graduating in 1807. While at Yale he was a member of the Society of Brothers in Unity. After reading for the law, he was admitted to the South Carolina bar in 1811.

DuBose served as a local justice of the peace and justice of the quorum and as a school commissioner and buildings commissioner. He served in the South Carolina House of Representatives in 1808 and in the South Carolina Senate in 1825 and 1834-5. He was a presidential elector in 1832, supporting John Floyd of the Nullifier Party, and a member of the South Carolina Nullification Convention in that year. He served as lieutenant governor from December 1836 to December 1838.

DuBose was a delegate to the Fourth Convention of Merchants and Others held in Charleston, South Carolina in 1839, part of a series of conventions intended to improve the regional economy.

== Personal life ==
DuBose lived on the Bluford Plantation, near Pineville, which had come into the possession of the DuBoses from his mother's family, the Sinklers. He married Laura Stevens in 1813, his step-mother's sister.

DuBose was a great-uncle of the Episcopal theologian William Porcher DuBose (1836-1918); William Porcher DuBose was the grandson of Samuel DuBose Jr., William DuBose's older brother. William DuBose was the brother-in-law of another lieutenant governor of South Carolina, William Cain, whose first marriage was to DuBose's sister Anna Marie (1793-1827).

Political offices
Preceded by Whitemarsh B. Seabrook	Lieutenant Governor of South Carolina; 1836–1838	Succeeded by Barnabas Kelet Henagan
