= Franklin Cannon =

American politician

5th Lieutenant Governor of Missouri
- In office November 21, 1836 – November 16, 1840
- Governor: Lilburn Boggs
- Preceded by: Lilburn Boggs
- Succeeded by: Meredith M. Marmaduke

Member of the Missouri Senate
- In office 1832

Member of the Missouri House of Representatives

Personal details
- Born: March 12, 1794 North Carolina
- Died: June 13, 1863 (aged 69) Cape Girardeau County, Missouri
- Party: Democratic
- Profession: Physician, farmer

Franklin Cannon (March 12, 1794 – June 13, 1863) was an American politician from the state of Missouri. A Democrat, he served as the state's 5th Lieutenant Governor. Cannon was the son-in-law of Missouri's 3rd Governor, Daniel Dunklin.

== Biography ==
Franklin Cannon came to Missouri Territory in 1819 from North Carolina and established a medical practice in the area that would later become Jackson, Missouri. He earned a reputation as an excellent medical doctor during a cholera outbreak that killed hundreds in Cape Girardeau County, Missouri in 1832 & 1833. After serving in the Missouri House of Representatives, Cannon was elected to the state senate in 1832.

On March 15, 1835, Cannon was wed to Mary W. Dunklin, daughter of Missouri Governor Daniel Dunklin. In 1836 Doctor Cannon defeated Whig candidate James Jones 57.6% to 42.1% to become Lieutenant Governor. After serving one term in office Cannon returned to Jackson and resumed his life as a medical doctor and prosperous plantation owner. His son would become a physician as well and the two constructed a large building in Jackson for use in their joint practice. In 1845, he served as a delegate to the failed Missouri Constitutional Convention. Franklin Cannon died June 13, 1863. He is buried in Jackson Cemetery in Cape Girardeau.

Political offices
Preceded by Lilburn Boggs	Lieutenant Governor of Missouri; 1836–1840	Succeeded by Meredith M. Marmaduke
