= David Hillis (politician) =

American politician

7th Lieutenant Governor of Indiana
- In office December 6, 1837 – December 9, 1840
- Governor: David Wallace
- Preceded by: David Wallace
- Succeeded by: Samuel Hall

Personal details
- Born: 1785 Washington County, Pennsylvania
- Died: July 8, 1845 (aged 59–60) Madison, Indiana, U.S.
- Party: Whig

David Hillis (1785 – July 8, 1845) was an American politician who served as the seventh Lieutenant Governor of Indiana from 1837 to 1840.

Hillis was born in Washington County, Pennsylvania. He settled in Indiana and served in the War of 1812 as a lieutenant in a mounted ranger company under Captain Williamson Dunn. A Whig, Hillis was a representative for Jefferson County in the Indiana House of Representatives beginning in 1823. In 1832, Hillis ran for a seat in the Indiana Senate, defeating Williamson Dunn, the former captain of the ranger company Hillis served in. In 1837, Indiana Democrats tried to encourage Hillis to run against David Wallace for the Whig nomination in the race. Hillis declined to contest the Whig nomination and later became the Whig candidate for Lieutenant Governor that same year. After being elected to the office of Lieutenant Governor, Hillis resigned his seat in the Senate and was succeeded by Dunn. Hillis served as Lieutenant Governor under Wallace from 1837 to 1840, serving during the Panic of 1837 and amid a controversy within state politics over internal improvements.

David Hillis was the father of David Burke Hillis, born in Jefferson County in 1835. David Burke Hillis was a medical doctor and merchant who settled in Keokuk, Iowa and served in the Civil War first as aide-de-camp to Iowa Governor Samuel J. Kirkwood and then as second colonel of the 17th Iowa Infantry Regiment.
