= David Wallace (Indiana politician) =

American politician (1799–1859)

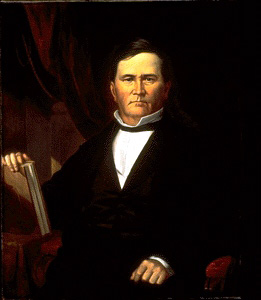

6th Governor of Indiana
- In office December 6, 1837 – December 9, 1840
- Lieutenant: David Hills
- Preceded by: Noah Noble
- Succeeded by: Samuel Bigger

6th Lieutenant Governor of Indiana
- In office December 7, 1831 – December 6, 1837
- Governor: Noah Noble
- Preceded by: Milton Stapp
- Succeeded by: David Hills

Indiana House of Representatives
- In office 1828–1831

Member of the U.S. House of Representatives from Indiana's 6th district
- In office March 4, 1841 – March 3, 1843
- Preceded by: William W. Wick
- Succeeded by: John W. Davis

Personal details
- Born: April 24, 1799 Mifflin County, Pennsylvania, US
- Died: September 4, 1859 (aged 60) Crown Hill Cemetery and Arboretum
- Resting place: Crown Hill Cemetery and Arboretum Sec 3, Lot 10; 39.8176127°N 86.1730399°W
- Party: Whig
- Spouse(s): Esther French Test; Zerelda Gray Sanders
- Children: 10, including Lew Wallace
- Profession: soldier, attorney, politician, judge

David Wallace (April 24, 1799 – September 4, 1859) was the sixth governor of the US state of Indiana. The Panic of 1837 occurred just before his election and the previous administration, which he had been part of, had taken on a large public debt. During his term the state entered a severe financial crisis that crippled the state's internal improvement projects. He advocated several measures to delay the inevitable insolvency of the state. Because of his connection to the internal improvement platform, his party refused to nominate him to run for a second term. The situation continued to deteriorate rapidly and led to state bankruptcy in his successor's term. After his term as governor, he became a congressman, then chairman of the Indiana Whig party before becoming a state judge, a position he held until his death.

== Early life ==
=== Family and background ===
David Wallace was born in Mifflin County, Pennsylvania, on April 24, 1799, the oldest of the seven children of Andrew and Eleanor Wallace. His father was a surveyor and tavern owner who became close friends with William Henry Harrison while the two served together in the War of 1812. The family benefited from Harrison's patronage. Wallace's brother, William H. Wallace, was appointed as the fourth governor of the Washington Territory and first governor of the Idaho Territory; another brother, John M. Wallace, was appointed Indiana Adjutant General.

His family moved to Ohio and settled near Cincinnati when he was a young boy. Wallace later attended Miami College before his family again moved to Brookville, Indiana, in 1817. With the help of Harrison, Wallace secured entrance into the United States Military Academy. He graduated from West Point in 1821 and served as a lieutenant of artillery and taught mathematics at the school, but resigned his commission after about a year in the service. He later served as a captain and colonel in the 7th Regiment, Indiana Militia.

When Wallace left the army he returned to his family in Brookville. There he began to study law in the office of Judge Miles C. Eggleston, and was admitted to the bar in 1823. He entered into a practice with Congressman John Test and married to his daughter, Esther French Test on November 10, 1824. They had four children together, one of whom was Lew Wallace, author of the novel Ben-Hur: A Tale of the Christ and Governor of New Mexico Territory. He is also the father of Edward Wallace, who fought in the Mexican-American war and the American Civil War. In 1836, after the death of his first wife, David married Zerelda Gray Sanders, a leader in the temperance movement, and together they had six children.

His brother, William H. Wallace (1811–1879), also became active in politics, serving as a U.S. Representative from Idaho Territory and Washington Territory, first governor of Idaho Territory, and fourth governor of Washington Territory.

== Public office ==
=== Legislator ===
In 1828, Wallace was elected to the Indiana House of Representatives, where he served until 1831, when he was elected the sixth Lieutenant Governor on the Whig ticket with Noah Noble. As Lieutenant Governor he led the debate in the state senate to create the Bank of Indiana and gained a reputation as a skilled orator. Wallace was an outspoken advocate of the state's internal improvement projects, and painted a rosy picture of the state's situation during his campaign for governor. His family moved to Covington during his term.

During his second term as Lieutenant Governor, the state passed the Mammoth Internal Improvement Act. Although it was at first extremely popular, it had soon become apparent to state leaders that it was leading the state to financial ruin. The problem was not fully evident when Wallace ran for governor in 1837, but was a small part of his election campaign. He was elected largely because of his prior support to the improvement act, which the public still supported, and his support from the popular governor Noah Noble.

=== Governor ===
Wallace's term as governor was marred by the Panic of 1837 and years of economic uncertainty which followed. Indiana had been enjoying a period of internal improvements of roads and canals, but nearly all such projects ended during this financial crisis. He was able to help arrange the state's finances to delay the inevitable bankruptcy of the state. The deficit only worsened, and by the end of his term, the state's income only covered 20% of its expenditures—interest on the massive state debt being over two-thirds of the budget. The last year of his term, work on all the projects was halted. Wallace delivered an address to the General Assembly to inform them that the works were almost entirely worthless in their present condition and the state's credit had been exhausted. He informed the legislature that the state would be insolvent in the following year.

The last of the Indian removals in Indiana occurred during Wallace's term, and only the few unwilling to leave voluntarily remained in the state. The 1833 Treaty of Chicago with the Potawatomi led to their removal. Wallace ordered General and U.S. Senator John Tipton to remove the band of 859 Potawatomi from the vicinity of Plymouth, Indiana, and send them to the Kansas Territory. Forty-two Potawatomi, mostly children, died from disease and the stress of the two-month march in what became known as the "Trail of Death".

During his term, Wallace set the date Indiana would observe Thanksgiving. On November 4, 1839, he issued an executive order making November 28 Thanksgiving Day. Wallace claimed to have done so at the request of representatives from different state churches.

By the end of his term, the impending financial disaster was becoming apparent to the state's residents. Seeking to break away from failing projects, the Whigs moved against projects and nominated Samuel Bigger to run for governor, denying Wallace and his pro-internal improvement position a spot on the Whig ticket. Wallace then returned to his law practice.

== Later life ==
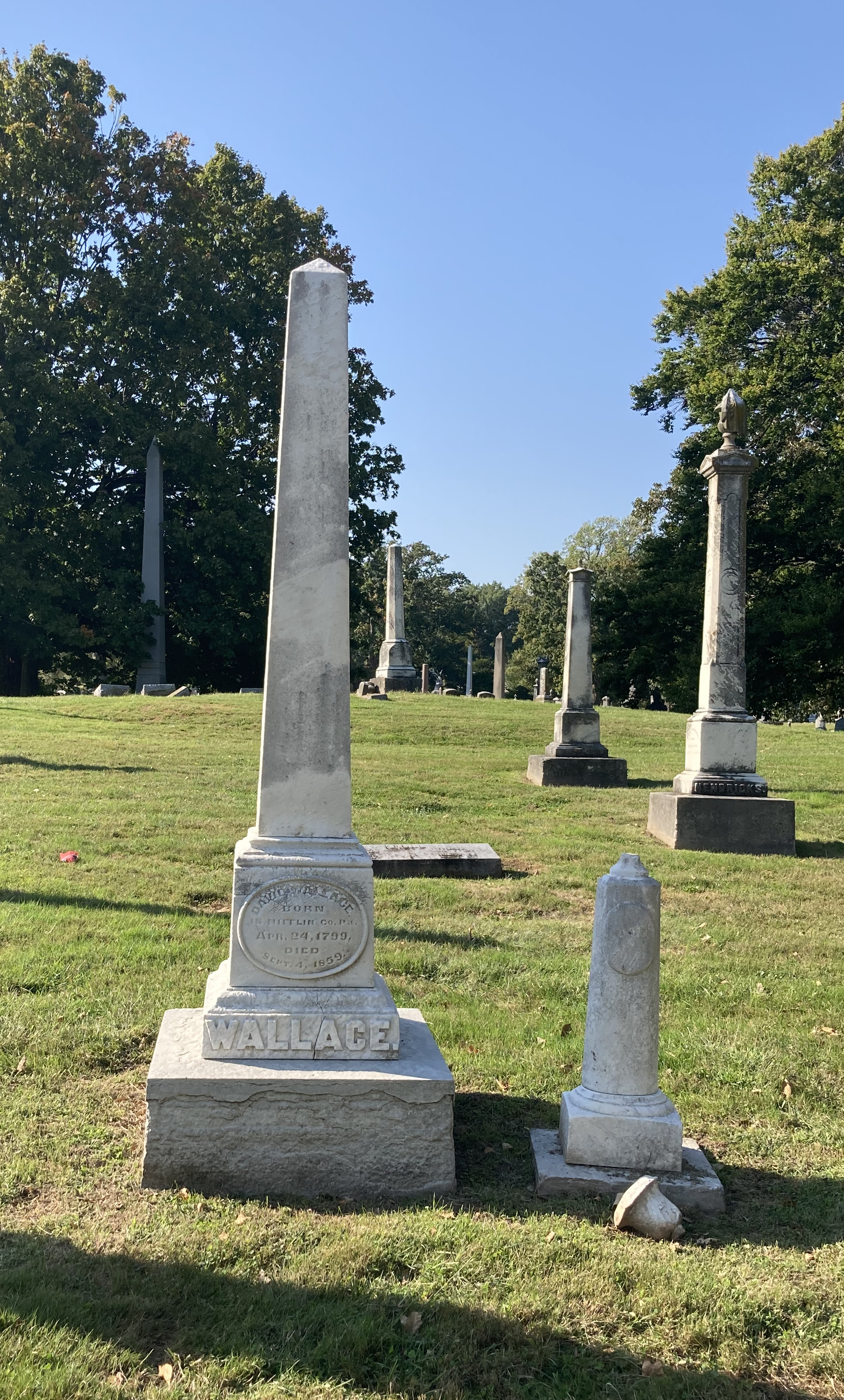
Wallace's grave at Crown Hill Cemetery

After his term as governor, Wallace was elected in 1841 to the U.S. House of Representatives from the Indianapolis district, defeating Nathan B. Palmer. While in Congress he supported federal spending on the development of the telegraph, for which he was ridiculed by his opponents, but was later vindicated by the success of the technology. Wallace failed in his attempt for reelection in 1843, being defeated by William J. Brown who won by 1,085 votes.

Wallace returned to Indiana where he became chairman of the state's Whig party in 1846. He served as a member of Indiana's constitutional convention in 1850–1851. His name is only mentioned nine times in the convention records and unlike the other former governors who attended, he did not play a major role in the convention. Wallace then became a judge of the Court of Common Pleas of Marion County from 1856 until his death.

Wallace died suddenly, without having been ill, on September 4, 1859, in Indianapolis, Indiana and is buried in Crown Hill Cemetery.

== See also ==
- List of governors of Indiana

Party political offices
Preceded by Noah Noble	Whig nominee for Governor of Indiana; 1837	Succeeded by Samuel Bigger
Political offices
Preceded by Milton Stapp	Lieutenant Governor of Indiana; 1831 – 1837	Succeeded by David Hills
Preceded by Noah Noble	Governor of Indiana; December 6, 1837 – December 9, 1840	Succeeded by Samuel Bigger
U.S. House of Representatives
Preceded by William W. Wick	Member of the U.S. House of Representatives from Indiana's 6th congressional district 1841–1843	Succeeded by John Wesley Davis
