= Patrick Noble =

American politician

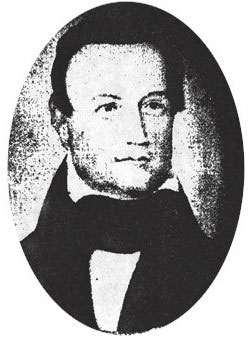

57th Governor of South Carolina
- In office December 10, 1838 – April 7, 1840
- Lieutenant: Barnabas Kelet Henagan
- Preceded by: Pierce Mason Butler
- Succeeded by: Barnabas Kelet Henagan

President of the South Carolina Senate
- In office November 28, 1836 – December 8, 1838
- Governor: George McDuffie; Pierce Mason Butler
- Preceded by: Henry Deas
- Succeeded by: Angus Patterson

Member of the South Carolina Senate from Abbeville District
- In office November 28, 1836 – December 8, 1838

19th and 23rd Speaker of the South Carolina House of Representatives
- In office November 25, 1833 – November 28, 1836
- Governor: Robert Young Hayne; George McDuffie
- Preceded by: Henry Laurens Pinckney
- Succeeded by: David Lewis Wardlaw
- In office December 18, 1818 – November 22, 1824
- Governor: John Geddes; Thomas Bennett, Jr. John Lyde Wilson
- Preceded by: Robert Young Hayne
- Succeeded by: John Belton O'Neall

Member of the South Carolina House of Representatives from Abbeville District
- In office November 26, 1832 – November 28, 1836
- In office November 28, 1814 – November 22, 1824

34th Lieutenant Governor of South Carolina
- In office December 9, 1830 – December 10, 1832
- Governor: James Hamilton, Jr.
- Preceded by: Thomas Williams
- Succeeded by: Charles Cotesworth Pinckney

Personal details
- Born: 1787 near Willington, South Carolina, US
- Died: April 7, 1840 (aged 52–53) Columbia, South Carolina, US
- Resting place: Willington Cemetery in McCormick County, South Carolina
- Party: Democratic
- Spouse: Elizabeth Bonneau Pickens
- Education: College of New Jersey

Patrick Noble (1787 – April 7, 1840) was the 57th governor of South Carolina from 1838 until his death in 1840.

== Early life and career ==
Born in Abbeville District Present Day Mccormick County, South Carolina, near Willington, Noble was educated at Moses Waddel's School and he graduated from the College of New Jersey in 1806. Upon graduation, he was admitted to the bar in 1809 and commenced the practice of law with John C. Calhoun. Noble was additionally active with the South Carolina militia from 1813 to 1814 and he served as a major.

== Political career ==
In 1814, Noble was elected to the South Carolina House of Representatives and was a member until 1824. The General Assembly elected Noble as the 34th Lieutenant Governor of South Carolina in 1830 for a two-year term. He was elected again to the House of Representatives upon the completion of his term as Lieutenant Governor in 1832 and he was elevated to the South Carolina Senate in 1836. Noble became Governor of South Carolina in 1838 upon election by the General Assembly. He was elected by 96-58 over Franklin H. Elmore.

His term as governor was marked by the aftermath effects of the Panic of 1837, resulting in the Charleston banks suspending specie payments. Noble died on April 7, 1840, before the expiration of his term. He was buried in Willington at the family cemetery.

== Family ==
Noble married Elizabeth Bonneau Pickens (1797-1834), daughter of Lieutenant Governor Ezekiel Pickens. They had seven children, of whom Edward (1820-1889), a lawyer, state representative, and major in the Confederate Army, was probably the most prominent. Samuel (1832-1890) served in the Confederate Army and was later a successful lawyer in Galveston, Texas.

Political offices
Preceded by Thomas Williams	Lieutenant Governor of South Carolina; 1830–1832	Succeeded by Charles Coteworth Pinckney
Preceded by Pierce Mason Butler	Governor of South Carolina; 1838–1840	Succeeded by Barnabas Kelet Henagan
