= 1916 in the United States =

- Decades: 1890s; 1900s; 1910s; 1920s; 1930s
- See also: History of the United States (1865–1918); Timeline of United States history (1900–1929); List of years in the United States

Events from the year 1916 in the United States.

== Incumbents ==
=== Federal government ===
- President: Woodrow Wilson (D-New Jersey)
- Vice President: Thomas R. Marshall (D-Indiana)
- Chief Justice: Edward Douglass White (Louisiana)
- Speaker of the House of Representatives: Champ Clark (D-Missouri)
- Congress: 64th

==== State governments ====
Governors and lieutenant governors

=== Governors ===
- Governor of Alabama: Charles Henderson (Democratic)
- Governor of Arizona: George W. P. Hunt (Democratic)
- Governor of Arkansas: George Washington Hays (Democratic)
- Governor of California: Hiram Johnson (Republican)
- Governor of Colorado: George Alfred Carlson (Republican)
- Governor of Connecticut: Marcus H. Holcomb (Republican)
- Governor of Delaware: Charles R. Miller (Republican)
- Governor of Florida: Park Trammell (Democratic)
- Governor of Georgia: Nathaniel E. Harris (Democratic)
- Governor of Idaho: Moses Alexander (Democratic)
- Governor of Illinois: Edward F. Dunne (Democratic)
- Governor of Indiana: Samuel M. Ralston (Democratic)
- Governor of Iowa: George W. Clarke (Republican)
- Governor of Kansas: Arthur Capper (Republican)
- Governor of Kentucky: Augustus O. Stanley (Democratic)
- Governor of Louisiana: Luther Egbert Hall (Democratic) (until May 9), Ruffin G. Pleasant (Democratic) (starting May 9)
- Governor of Maine: Oakley C. Curtis (Democratic)
- Governor of Maryland: Phillips Lee Goldsborough (Republican) (until January 12), Emerson C. Harrington (Democratic) (starting January 12)
- Governor of Massachusetts: David I. Walsh (Democratic) (until January 6), Samuel W. McCall (Republican) (starting January 6)
- Governor of Michigan: Woodbridge N. Ferris (Democratic)
- Governor of Minnesota: J. A. A. Burnquist (Republican)
- Governor of Mississippi: Earl L. Brewer (Democratic) (until January 18), Theodore G. Bilbo (Democratic) (starting January 18)
- Governor of Missouri: Elliot Woolfolk Major (Democratic)
- Governor of Montana: Sam V. Stewart (Democratic)
- Governor of Nebraska: John H. Morehead (Democratic)
- Governor of Nevada: Emmet D. Boyle (Democratic)
- Governor of New Hampshire: Rolland H. Spaulding (Republican)
- Governor of New Jersey: James Fairman Fielder (Democratic)
- Governor of New Mexico: William C. McDonald (Democratic)
- Governor of New York: Charles S. Whitman (Republican)
- Governor of North Carolina: Locke Craig (Democratic)
- Governor of North Dakota: L. B. Hanna (Republican)
- Governor of Ohio: Frank B. Willis (Democratic)
- Governor of Oklahoma: Robert L. Williams (Democratic)
- Governor of Oregon: James Withycombe (Republican)
- Governor of Pennsylvania: Martin Grove Brumbaugh (Republican)
- Governor of Rhode Island: R. Livingston Beeckman (Republican)
- Governor of South Carolina: Richard Irvine Manning III (Democratic)
- Governor of South Dakota: Frank M. Byrne (Republican)
- Governor of Tennessee: Tom C. Rye (Democratic)
- Governor of Texas: James E. Ferguson (Democratic)
- Governor of Utah: William Spry (Republican)
- Governor of Vermont: Charles W. Gates (Republican)
- Governor of Virginia: Henry Carter Stuart (Democratic)
- Governor of Washington: Ernest Lister (Democratic)
- Governor of West Virginia: Henry D. Hatfield (Republican)
- Governor of Wisconsin: Emanuel L. Philipp (Republican)
- Governor of Wyoming: John B. Kendrick (Democratic)

=== Lieutenant governors ===
- Lieutenant Governor of Alabama: Thomas E. Kilby (Democratic)
- Lieutenant Governor of California: John Morton Eshleman (Progressive) (until July 22), William Stephens (Republican) (starting July 22)
- Lieutenant Governor of Colorado: Moses E. Lewis (Republican)
- Lieutenant Governor of Connecticut: Clifford B. Wilson (Republican)
- Lieutenant Governor of Delaware: Colen Ferguson (Democratic)
- Lieutenant Governor of Idaho: Herman H. Taylor (Republican)
- Lieutenant Governor of Illinois: Barratt O'Hara (Democratic)
- Lieutenant Governor of Indiana: William P. O'Neill (Democratic)
- Lieutenant Governor of Iowa: William L. Harding (Republican)
- Lieutenant Governor of Kansas: William Yoast Morgan (Republican)
- Lieutenant Governor of Kentucky: James D. Black (Democratic)
- Lieutenant Governor of Louisiana: Thomas C. Barret (Democratic) (until May 9), Fernand Mouton (Democratic) (starting May 9)
- Lieutenant Governor of Massachusetts: Grafton D. Cushing (Republican) (until January 6), Calvin Coolidge (Republican) (starting January 6)
- Lieutenant Governor of Michigan: Luren D. Dickinson (Republican)
- Lieutenant Governor of Minnesota: vacant (until October 28), George H. Sullivan (Republican) (starting October 28)
- Lieutenant Governor of Mississippi: Theodore G. Bilbo (Democratic) (until January 18), Lee Maurice Russell (Democratic) (starting January 18)
- Lieutenant Governor of Missouri: William Rock Painter (Democratic)
- Lieutenant Governor of Montana: W. W. McDowell (Democratic)
- Lieutenant Governor of Nebraska: James Pearson (Democratic)
- Lieutenant Governor of Nevada: Maurice J. Sullivan (Democratic)
- Lieutenant Governor of New Mexico: Ezequiel Cabeza De Baca (Democratic)
- Lieutenant Governor of New York: Edward Schoeneck (Republican)
- Lieutenant Governor of North Carolina: Elijah L. Daughtridge (Democratic)
- Lieutenant Governor of North Dakota: John H. Fraine (Republican)
- Lieutenant Governor of Ohio: John H. Arnold (Republican)
- Lieutenant Governor of Oklahoma: Martin E. Trapp (Democratic)
- Lieutenant Governor of Pennsylvania: Frank B. McClain (Republican)
- Lieutenant Governor of Rhode Island: Emery J. San Souci (Republican)
- Lieutenant Governor of South Carolina: Andrew Bethea (Democratic)
- Lieutenant Governor of South Dakota: Peter Norbeck (Republican)
- Lieutenant Governor of Tennessee: Albert E. Hill (Democratic)
- Lieutenant Governor of Texas: William Pettus Hobby, Sr. (Democratic)
- Lieutenant Governor of Vermont: Hale K. Darling (Republican)
- Lieutenant Governor of Virginia: James Taylor Ellyson (Democratic)
- Lieutenant Governor of Washington: Louis Folwell Hart (Republican)
- Lieutenant Governor of Wisconsin: Edward F. Dithmar (Republican)

== Events ==
=== January ===
- January – The Journal of Negro History is founded by Carter G. Woodson, the father of "Black History" and "Negro History Week".
- January 24
  - In Browning, Montana, the temperature drops from +6.7 °C to −48.8 °C (44 °F to −56 °F) in one day, the greatest change ever on record for a 24-hour period.
  - Brushaber v. Union Pacific Railroad: The Supreme Court of the United States upholds the national income tax.
- c. January – The Anti-Militarism Committee changes its name to the Anti-Preparedness Committee, later in the year becoming the American Union Against Militarism.

=== February ===
- February 11
  - Emma Goldman is arrested for lecturing on birth control.
  - The Baltimore Symphony Orchestra presents its first concert.

=== March ===
- March 3 – The Original Dixieland Jazz Band begin playing at Schiller's Cafe in Chicago. Until June 5 it is known as Stein's Dixie Jazz Band.
- March 6 – Newton D. Baker appointed Secretary of War.
- March 8–9 – Mexican Revolution: Pancho Villa leads about 500 Mexican raiders in an attack against Columbus, New Mexico, killing 12 U.S. soldiers. A garrison of the U.S. 13th Cavalry Regiment fights back and drives them away.
- March 15 – President Woodrow Wilson sends 12,000 United States troops over the U.S.-Mexico border to pursue Pancho Villa; the 13th Cavalry regiment enters Mexican territory.
- March 16 – Mexican Revolution
  - The U.S. 7th and 10th Cavalry regiments under John J. Pershing cross the border to join the hunt for Villa.
  - United States Army aircraft fly their first mission over foreign soil when Curtiss JN-3s of the 1st Aero Squadron carry out reconnaissance over Mexico.

=== April ===
- April 20
  - The Escadrille Américaine ("American Squadron"), later to be known as the Lafayette Escadrille ("Lafayette Squadron"), is established as an American volunteer unit of the French Air Force. Their first aerial victory is claimed on May 18 by Kiffin Rockwell.
  - The Chicago Cubs play their first game at Weeghman Park (modern-day Wrigley Field), defeating the Cincinnati Reds 7–6 in 11 innings.

=== May ===
- May 5 – United States occupation of the Dominican Republic (1916–24) begins when companies of the United States Marine Corps land in the Dominican Republic.
- May 15 – Lynching of Jesse Washington: Jesse Washington, a black farmhand, is brutally lynched in Robinson, Texas by a crowd of white people, for allegedly murdering his employers' wife.
- May 19 – Norman Rockwell's first cover for The Saturday Evening Post, Boy with Baby Carriage.
- May 22 – The case of United States v. Forty Barrels and Twenty Kegs of Coca-Cola is decided.

=== June ===
- June 3 – Division of Militia Affairs renamed Militia Bureau.
- June 5 – Louis Brandeis is sworn in as a Justice of the United States Supreme Court.
- June 15 – U.S. President Woodrow Wilson signs a bill incorporating the Boy Scouts of America. This year also, Robert Baden-Powell founds the Wolf Cubs in Britain, changed to Cub Scouts in the U.S.

=== July ===
- July 1 – The United States Marine Corps take control of Santo Domingo.
- July 1–12 – At least one shark mauls five swimmers along 80 miles (130 km) of New Jersey coastline during the Jersey Shore shark attacks of 1916, resulting in four deaths and the survival of one youth who required limb amputation. This event is the inspiration for author Peter Benchley, over half a century later, to write Jaws.
- July 8–16 – Massive flooding caused by two hurricanes devastates western North Carolina and kills 80 people.
- July 15 – In Seattle, Washington, William Boeing incorporates Pacific Aero Products (later renamed The Boeing Company).
- July 22 – In San Francisco, California, a bomb explodes on Market Street during a Preparedness Day parade, killing 10 and injuring 40. Warren Billings and Tom Mooney would later be wrongfully convicted of the bombing.
- July 30 – German agents cause the Black Tom explosion in Jersey City, New Jersey, an act of sabotage destroying an ammunition depot and killing at least seven people.

=== August ===
- August 1 – Hawaiʻi Volcanoes National Park is established in Hawaii
- August 9 – Lassen Volcanic National Park is established in California.
- August 25 – U.S. President Woodrow Wilson signs legislation creating the National Park Service.
- August 29
  - Council of National Defense formed.
  - The United States passes the Philippine Autonomy Act.

=== September ===
- September 1 – The Keating–Owen Act, the first federal law to restrict child labor, is passed, but is ruled unconstitutional in 1918.
- September 5 – Release of D. W. Griffith's film Intolerance: Love's Struggle Through the Ages.
- September 6 – The first true self-service grocery store, Piggly Wiggly, is founded in Memphis, Tennessee, by Clarence Saunders (opening 5 days later).
- September 7 – The Merchant Marine Act of 1916 establishes the U.S. Shipping Board (inaugurated January 1917).
- September 13 – Mary, a circus elephant, is hanged in the town of Erwin, Tennessee for killing her handler, Walter "Red" Eldridge.
- September 30 – Construction is completed on the Hell Gate Bridge in New York City.

=== October ===
- October 7 – Georgia Tech defeats Cumberland 222-0 in the most lopsided game in college football history.
- October 16 – Margaret Sanger opens a family planning and birth control clinic in Brownsville, Brooklyn, the first of its kind in the U.S., a forerunner of Planned Parenthood. Nine days later, she is arrested for breaking a New York state law prohibiting distribution of contraceptives. This same year, she publishes What Every Girl Should Know, providing information about such topics as menstruation and sexuality in adolescents.

=== November ===
- November 1 – The first 40-hour work week officially begins in the Endicott-Johnson factories of Western New York.
- November 5 – Everett massacre: An armed confrontation in Everett, Washington, between local authorities and members of the Industrial Workers of the World results in seven deaths.
- November 7
  - 1916 United States presidential election: Democratic President Woodrow Wilson narrowly defeats Republican Charles E. Hughes.
  - Republican Jeannette Rankin of Montana becomes the first woman elected to the United States House of Representatives.
  - Radio station 2XG, located in the Highbridge section of New York City, makes the first audio broadcast of presidential election returns.
- November 19 – Ruth Law sets a new distance record for cross-country flight by flying 590 miles (950 km) non-stop from Chicago to New York State. She flies on to New York City the next day.
- November 21 – The U.S. rejects a German offer of £10000 per American lost in the sinking of the RMS Lusitania.

=== December ===
- December – Wilbur Sweatman records his hot ragtime for Emerson Records in New York City.
- December 5 – "Petticoat Revolution" in Umatilla, Oregon: 7 women successfully capture the mayorship and a majority of council seats.
- December 31
  - The Hampton Terrace Hotel in North Augusta, South Carolina, one of the largest and most luxurious hotels in the nation at this time, burns to the ground.
  - 14 journals have published Louis Raemaekers's anti-German cartoons.

=== Undated ===
- The Society of Motion Picture and Television Engineers is founded as the Society of Motion Picture Engineers.
- Louis Enricht claims he has a substitute for gasoline.

=== Ongoing ===
- Progressive Era (1890s–1920s)
- Lochner era in the Supreme Court of the United States (c. 1897–c. 1937)
- U.S. occupation of Haiti (1915–1934)
- Pancho Villa Expedition (1916–1917)

== Births ==
=== January–June ===
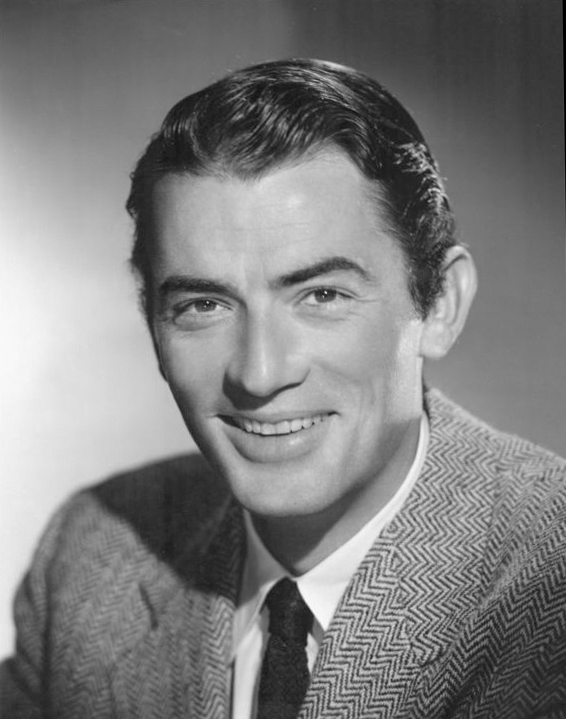
Gregory Peck

- January 2 – Joseph W. Schmitt, spacesuit technician (died 2017)
- January 3
  - Maxene Andrews, singer (The Andrews Sisters) (died 1995)
  - Betty Furness, actress and consumer activist (died 1994)
  - Bernard Greenhouse, cellist (died 2011)
  - Warren King, cartoonist (died 1978)
- January 4 – Sidney Siegel, psychologist (died 1961)
- January 5 – Alfred Ryder, actor (died 1995)
- January 6 – Eugene Thomas Maleska, American journalist (died 1993)
- January 9 – Vic Mizzy, television theme composer (died 2009)
- January 14
  - Maxwell Davis, R&B musician (died 1970)
  - Glenn Simmons, outdoorsman and guide, skiff builder (died 2009)
- January 15 – Artie Shapiro, jazz bassist (died 2003)
- January 17 – Peter Frelinghuysen, Jr., politician (died 2011)
- January 19 – Harry Huskey, computer designer (died 2017)
- January 23 – David Douglas Duncan, photojournalist (died 2018)
- January 24 – Marvin Creamer, sailor (died 2020)
- February 7 – Floyd Haskell, U.S. Senator from Colorado from 1973 to 1979 (died 1998)
- February 8 – Betty Field, actress (died 1973)
- February 9 – Tex Hughson, baseball player (died 1993)
- February 10
  - Louis Guttman, mathematician (died 1987)
  - Julia Hawkins, athlete (died 2024)
- February 14
  - Denham Harman, gerontologist (died 2014)
  - Charles Wycliffe Joiner, judge (died 2017)
  - Edward Platt, actor (died 1974)
- February 15 – Mary Jane Croft, actress (died 1999)
- February 20 – Jean Erdman, dancer (died 2020)
- February 23 – Retta Scott, animator (died 1990)
- February 26
  - Jackie Gleason, film actor (died 1987)
  - Preacher Roe, baseball player (died 2008)
- February 29 – Dinah Shore, popular singer (died 1994)
- March 1 – Emelyn Whiton, Olympic sailor (died 1962)
- March 4 – William Alland, film actor, producer, writer and director (died 1997)
- March 5 – Jack Hamm, cartoonist (died 1996)
- March 6 – Rochelle Hudson, actress (died 1972)
- March 13
  - Lindy Boggs, politician (died 2013)
  - Jacque Fresco, futurist and designer (died 2017)
  - John Aspinwall Roosevelt, businessman and philanthropist (died 1981)
  - Robert O. Peterson, businessman and philanthropist (died 1994)
- March 14 – Horton Foote, writer (died 2009)
- March 15
  - Junior Coghlan (Frank Coghlan, Jr.), film actor and naval aviator (died 2009)
  - Harry James, musician and band leader (died 1983)
- March 16 – Mercedes McCambridge, actress (died 2004)
- March 19 – Irving Wallace, novelist (died 1990)
- March 26 – Christian B. Anfinsen, biochemist, winner of the Nobel Prize in Chemistry (died 1995)
- March 29 – Eugene McCarthy, U.S. Senator from Minnesota from 1959 to 1971 (died 2005)
- March 31 – Lucille Bliss, voice actress (died 2012)
- April 1 – John Holter, toolmaker and medical device inventor (died 2003)
- April 3
  - Herb Caen, journalist (died 1997)
  - Peter Gowland, photographer (died 2010)
- April 4
  - Robert S. McMillan, architect (died 2001)
  - David White, actor (died 1990)
- April 5
  - Albert Henry Ottenweller, Roman Catholic bishop (died 2012)
  - Gregory Peck, film actor (died 2003)
- April 12
  - Beverly Cleary, children's author (died 2021)
  - Benjamin Libet, pioneering scientist in the field of human consciousness (died 2007)
  - Movita Castaneda, actress (died 2015)
- April 13 – Phyllis Fraser, actress and publisher (died 2006)
- April 15
  - Alfred S. Bloomingdale, department store heir (died 1982)
  - Helene Hanff, writer (died 1997)
- April 16 – Ted Mann, businessman (died 2001)
- April 18 – Carl Burgos, comic book artist (died 1984)
- April 20 – Phil Walters, race car driver and pilot (died 2000)
- April 22 – Yehudi Menuhin, violinist (died 1999)
- April 24
  - Stanley Kauffmann, film critic (died 2013)
  - Lou Thesz, wrestler (died 2002)
- April 25 – R. J. Rushdoony, founder of Christian Reconstructionism (died 2001)
- April 26
  - Dorothy Salisbury Davis, writer (died 2014)
  - Vic Perrin, voice actor (died 1989)
  - George Tuska, comic strip artist (died 2009)
- April 27 – Enos Slaughter, baseball player (died 2002)
- April 30
  - Claude Elwood Shannon, mathematician, "father of information theory" (died 2001)
  - Robert Shaw, choral and orchestral conductor (died 1999)
- May 2 – Two Ton Baker (Richard Baker), entertainer (died 1975)
- May 4 – Jane Jacobs, née Butzner, urban activist (died 2006 in Canada)
- May 6
  - Adriana Caselotti, voice actress (died 1997)
  - Robert H. Dicke, physicist (died 1997)
- May 10 – Milton Babbitt, composer (died 2011)
- May 14 – Del Moore, actor, comedian and radio announcer (died 1970)
- May 15 – Abbott Pattison, sculptor and abstract artist (died 1999)
- May 18 – Miriam Goldberg, newspaper publisher (died 2017)
- May 21
  - Louis Crump, politician (died 2019)
  - Dennis Day, singer and actor (died 1988)
  - Lydia Mendoza, singer-guitarist (died 2007)
  - Harold Robbins, novelist (died 1997)
- May 28 – Dorothy McGuire, film actress (died 2001)
- June 3 – Jack Manning, actor (died 2009)
- June 4 – Robert F. Furchgott, biochemist, winner of the Nobel Prize in Physiology or Medicine (died 2009)
- June 5 – Eddie Joost, baseball player and manager (died 2011)
- June 6 – Jack Miller, U.S. Senator from Iowa from 1961 to 1973 (died 1994)
- June 12 – Raúl Héctor Castro, politician (died 2015)
- June 14 – John Ciardi, poet, translator and etymologist (died 1986)
- June 15
  - Olga Erteszek, lingerie designer and manufacturer (died 1989)
  - Herbert A. Simon, winner of the Nobel Prize in Economics (died 2001)
- June 16 – Phil Chambers, actor (died 1993)
- June 17 – David "Stringbean" Akeman, country music banjo player (died 1973)
- June 21 – Herbert Friedman, physicist (died 2000)
- June 22 – Richard Eastham, actor (died 2005)
- June 24 – William B. Saxbe, politician (died 2010)
- June 25 – Thomas Reddin, police officer (died 2004)
- June 29
  - John M. Johansen, architect (died 2012)
  - Ruth Warrick, television actress (died 2005)

=== July–December ===
- July 1
  - Olivia de Havilland, Japanese born-British actress (died 2020)
  - Lawrence Halprin, architect (died 2009)
- July 2 – Ken Curtis, screen actor and singer (died 1991)
- July 3 – John Kundla, basketball coach (died 2017)
- July 4 – Iva Toguri D'Aquino ("Tokyo Rose"), propaganda broadcaster (died 2006)
- July 6
  - Don R. Christensen, animator and cartoonist. (died 2006)
  - Harold Norse, writer (died 2009)
- July 8
  - Otto Luedeke, Olympic cyclist (died 2005)
  - Jean Rouverol, actress, screenwriter and author (died 2017)
  - Marion Hartzog Smoak, lawyer and politician (died 2020)
- July 10 – Nicholas D'Antonio Salza, Roman Catholic bishop (died 2009)
- July 15
  - Les Dye, American football player (died 2000)
  - Sumner Gerard, politician and diplomat (died 2005)
- July 18
  - Ed Cifers, American football player (died 2005)
  - L. Patrick Gray III, Federal Bureau of Investigation director (died 2005)
  - Johnny Hopp, baseball player and coach (died 2003)
  - Charles Kittel, physicist (died 2019)
- July 19 – Phil Cavarretta, baseball player (died 2010)
- July 21 – Sergeant Stubby, World War I hero war dog (died 1926)
- July 23 – Sandra Gould, actress (died 1999)
- July 25 – Fred Lasswell, cartoonist (died 2001)
- July 27 – Elizabeth Hardwick, literary critic and novelist (died 2007)
- July 28 – David Brown, film and theater producer (died 2010)
- July 31 – Bill Todman, game show producer (died 1979)
- August 5 – Kermit Love, puppeteer (died 2008)
- August 11 – William Coors, brewing executive (died 2018)
- August 12 – Ralph Nelson, film and television director and producer (died 1987)
- August 14 – Ralph de Toledano, conservationist and author (died 2007)
- August 16
  - Iggy Katona, race car driver (died 2003)
  - Edythe Wright, singer (died 1965)
- August 21
  - Frank Braynard, maritime writer and historian (died 2007)
  - Bill Lee, playback singer (died 1980)
- August 22
  - Robert H. Krieble, chemist (died 1997)
  - Joe Martinelli, soccer player (died 1991)
- August 24 – Hal Smith, actor (died 1994)
- August 25
  - Van Johnson, film actor (died 2008)
  - Frederick Chapman Robbins, pediatrician and virologist, winner of the Nobel Prize in Physiology or Medicine (died 2003)
- August 27 – Martha Raye, film actress (died 1994)
- August 28 – Jack Vance, writer (died 2013)
- August 29 – Luther Davis, screenwriter (died 2008)
- August 30 – Shag Crawford, baseball umpire (died 2007)
- August 31
  - Daniel Schorr, journalist (died 2010)
  - John S. Wold, politician (died 2017)
- September 1
  - Dorothy Cheney, tennis player (died 2014)
  - Joseph Minish, politician (died 2007)
- September 12 – Edward Binns, actor (died 1990)
- September 13 – John Malcolm Brinnin, poet and literary critic (died 1998)
- September 15 – Frederick C. Weyand, U.S. Army General (died 2010)
- September 18 – John Jacob Rhodes, politician and lawyer (died 2003)
- September 24 – Ruth Leach Amonette, businesswoman (died 2004)
- September 26 – Frank Handlen, marine artist (died 2023)
- September 27 – Ira Colitz, politician (died 1998)
- October 2 – Jim L. Gillis Jr., politician (died 2018)
- October 3 – Shelby Storck, television producer (died 1969)
- October 8 – Spark Matsunaga, U.S. Senator from Hawaii from 1977 to 1990 (died 1990)
- October 9 – Robert Brubaker, television Western actor (died 2010)
- October 12 – Alice Childress, actress, playwright and novelist (died 1994)
- October 21
  - Eddie Carnett, baseball player (died 2016)
  - Violet Hensley, luthier and musician (died 2026)
- October 24 – Ramsay D. Potts, American air force general (died 2006)
- October 28 – Bill Harris, jazz trombonist (died 1973)
- October 29 – Hadda Brooks, pianist, singer and composer (died 2002)
- October 30
  - Leon Day, baseball player (died 1995)
  - Charles E. Potter, U.S. Senator from Michigan from 1952 to 1959 (died 1979)
- October 31 – Phil Monroe, animator and director (died 1988)

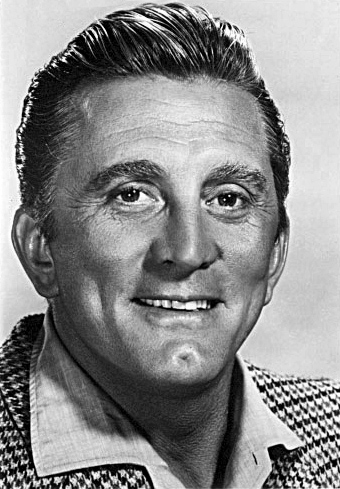
Kirk Douglas

- November 4 – Walter Cronkite, television journalist (died 2009)
- November 5
  - Bill Fisk, football player and coach (died 2007)
  - Jim Tabor, baseball player (died 1953)
- November 6 – Ray Conniff, trombonist and bandleader (died 2002)
- November 10 – Billy May, composer and arranger (died 2004)
- November 14 – Sherwood Schwartz, television writer and producer (died 2011)
- November 15 – Bill Melendez, animator (died 2008)
- November 16 – Daws Butler, voice actor (died 1988)
- November 17 – Shelby Foote, historian and novelist, author of The Civil War: A Narrative (died 2005)
- November 24
  - Forrest J. Ackerman, writer (died 2008)
  - Frankie Muse Freeman, civil rights attorney (died 2018)
- November 27 – Chick Hearn, basketball announcer (died 2002)
- November 29 – Fran Ryan, actress (died 2000)
- November 30 – John C. Harkness, architect (died 2016)

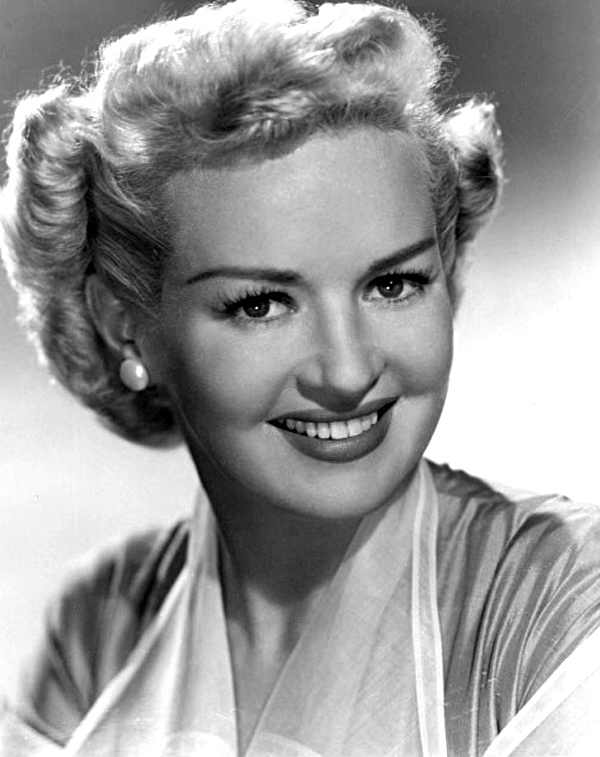
Betty Grable

- December 6 – Hugo Peretti, songwriter and record producer (died 1986)
- December 7
  - John G. Morris, picture editor (died 2017)
  - George Russell Weller, retired salesman known for the Santa Monica Farmers Market crash in 2003 (died 2010)
- December 8 – Richard Fleischer, film director (died 2006)
- December 9
  - Jerome Beatty, Jr., children's author (died 2002)
  - Kirk Douglas, film actor (died 2020)
  - Esther Wilkins, pioneer of dental hygiene (died 2016)
- December 14 – Shirley Jackson, writer (died 1965)
- December 18 – Betty Grable, film actress (died 1973)
- December 19 – John Crutcher, politician (died 2017)
- December 20 – Morrie Schwartz, sociologist (died 1995)
- December 25 – Oscar Moore, swing jazz guitarist (died 1981)
- December 27
  - Johnny Frigo, jazz violinist and bassist (died 2007)
  - Cathy Lewis, actress (died 1968)

== Deaths ==
- January 1 – Alfred W. Benson, U.S. Senator from Kansas from 1906 to 1907 (born 1843)
- January 9 – Ada Rehan, Shakespearean actress (born 1859 in Ireland)
- January 16 – Charles A. Zimmermann, band composer (born 1861)
- January 17
  - Jeannette Leonard Gilder, author and editor (born 1849)
  - Arthur V. Johnson, silent movie actor and director, of tuberculosis (born 1876)
- February 3 – Bowman Brown Law, politician (born 1855)
- February 12 – John Townsend Trowbridge, author (born 1827)
- February 28 – Henry James, naturalised English novelist (born 1843)
- March 20
  - Ota Benga, pygmy, suicide (born c. 1883 in the Belgian Congo)
  - Stephen Wallace Dorsey, U.S. Senator from Arkansas from 1873 to 1879 (born 1842)
- March 25 – Ishi, last known member of the Yana people (born c. 1860)
- April 11 – Richard Harding Davis, journalist and author (born 1864)
- April 15 – Joanna P. Moore, Baptist missionary and educator (born 1832)
- April 19 – Ephraim Shay, inventor (born 1839)
- April 21 – John Surratt, suspected of involvement in the assassination of Abraham Lincoln, son of Mary Surratt (born 1844)
- May 12 – Fred T. Perris, railroad civil engineer (born 1836)
- May 13
  - Clara Louise Kellogg, operatic soprano (born 1842)
  - Sholem Aleichem, Yiddish writer (born 1859 in Ukraine)
- May 29 – James J. Hill, financier (born 1838)
- May 30 – John S. Mosby, Confederate army cavalry battalion commander in the American Civil War (born 1833)
- June 9 – Richard C. Saufley, naval aviation pioneer, killed in aviation accident (born 1884)
- June 22 – Oliver Ernesto Branch, politician (born 1847)
- June 24 – Victor Chapman, fighter pilot in the French Air Force, killed in action (born 1890)
- June 25 – Thomas Eakins, realist painter (born 1844)
- June – Addison Hutton, architect (born 1834)
- July 3 – Hetty Green, financier and miser (born 1834)
- July 4 – Alan Seeger, poet, killed in action (born 1888)
- July 22 – James Whitcomb Riley, poet (born 1849)
- July 23 – Thomas M. Patterson, newspaper publisher and U.S. Senator from Colorado from 1901 to 1907 (born 1839 in Ireland)
- August 31 – Martha McClellan Brown, temperance activist (born 1838)
- September 8 – James Gray, journalist and 19th Mayor of Minneapolis (born 1862)
- September 9 – Sydney Ayres, silent film actor (born 1879)
- October 1 – James Paul Clarke, 18th Governor of Arkansas from 1895 to 1897 and U.S. Senator from Arkansas from 1903 to 1916 (born 1854)
- October 12 – Tony Jannus, aviator and aircraft designer, killed in aviation accident in Russia (born 1889)
- October 25 – William Merritt Chase, Impressionist painter (born 1849)
- October 28 – Cleveland Abbe, meteorologist (born 1838)
- October 29 – John Sebastian Little, politician and congressman (born 1851)
- October 31 – Charles Taze Russell, Protestant evangelist, forerunner of Jehovah's Witnesses (born 1852)
- November 4 – James D. Moffat, 3rd president of Washington & Jefferson College (born 1846)
- November 10 – Walter Sutton, geneticist and surgeon (born 1877)
- November 13 – Percival Lowell, astronomer (born 1855)
- November 14
  - Henry George, Jr., politician (born 1862)
  - Franklin Ware Mann, inventor (born 1856)
- November 15 – Molly Elliot Seawell, novelist (born 1860)
- November 22
  - Ida Dixon, socialite and golf course architect (born 1854)
  - Jack London, writer (born 1876)
- November 24 – Sir Hiram Maxim, firearms inventor (born 1840)
- November – Charlie Case, vaudeville entertainer (born c. 1860)
- December 8 – John Porter Merrell, admiral (born 1846)
- December 20 – William W. Gilchrist, composer (born 1846)
- December 31 – Alice Ball, African-American chemist (born 1892)

== See also ==
- List of American films of 1916
- Timeline of United States history (1900–1929)
