= 1849 in the United States =

- Decades: 1820s; 1830s; 1840s; 1850s; 1860s
- See also: History of the United States (1849–1865); Timeline of United States history (1820–1859); List of years in the United States

Events from the year 1849 in the United States.

== Incumbents ==
=== Federal government ===
- President:

James K. Polk (D-Tennessee) (until March 4)
Zachary Taylor (W-Kentucky) (starting March 4)

- Vice President:

George M. Dallas (D-Pennsylvania) (until March 4)
Millard Fillmore (W-New York) (starting March 4)

- Chief Justice: Roger B. Taney (Maryland)
- Speaker of the House of Representatives:

Robert Charles Winthrop (W-Massachusetts) (until March 4)
Howell Cobb (D-Georgia) (starting December 22)

- Congress: 30th (until March 4), 31st (starting March 4)

==== State governments ====
Governors and lieutenant governors

=== Governors ===
- Governor of Alabama: Reuben Chapman (Democratic) (until December 17), Henry W. Collier (Democratic) (starting December 17)
- Governor of Arkansas:
  - until January 10: Thomas Stevenson Drew (Democratic)
  - January 10-April 19: Richard C. Byrd (Democratic)
  - starting April 19: John Selden Roane (Democratic)
- Governor of Connecticut: Clark Bissell (Whig) (until May 2), Joseph Trumbull (Whig) (starting May 2)
- Governor of Delaware: William Tharp (Democratic)
- Governor of Florida: William Dunn Moseley (Democratic) (until October 1), Thomas Brown (Whig) (starting October 1)
- Governor of Georgia: George W. Towns (Democratic)
- Governor of Illinois: Augustus C. French (Democratic)
- Governor of Indiana: Paris C. Dunning (Democratic) (until December 5), Joseph A. Wright (Democratic) (starting December 5)
- Governor of Iowa: Ansel Briggs (Democratic)
- Governor of Kentucky: John J. Crittenden (Whig)
- Governor of Louisiana: Isaac Johnson (Democratic)
- Governor of Maine: John W. Dana (Democratic)
- Governor of Maryland: Philip F. Thomas (Democratic)
- Governor of Massachusetts: George N. Briggs (Democratic)
- Governor of Michigan: Epaphroditus Ransom (Democratic)
- Governor of Mississippi: Joseph W. Matthews (Democratic)
- Governor of Missouri: Austin Augustus King (Democratic)
- Governor of New Hampshire: Jared W. Williams (Democratic) (until June 7), Samuel Dinsmoor, Jr. (Democratic) (starting June 7)
- Governor of New Jersey: Daniel Haines (Democratic)
- Governor of New York: Hamilton Fish (Whig) (starting January 1)
- Governor of North Carolina: William Alexander Graham (Whig) (until January 1), Charles Manly (Whig) (starting January 1)
- Governor of Ohio: William Bebb (Whig) (until January 22), Seabury Ford (Whig) (starting January 22)
- Governor of Pennsylvania: William F. Johnston (Whig)
- Governor of Rhode Island: Elisha Harris (Whig) (until May 1), Henry B. Anthony (Whig) (starting May 1)
- Governor of South Carolina: Whitemarsh B. Seabrook (Democratic)
- Governor of Tennessee: Neill S. Brown (Whig) (until October 16), William Trousdale (Democratic) (starting October 16)
- Governor of Texas: George T. Wood (Democratic) (until December 21), Peter Hansborough Bell (Democratic) (starting December 21)
- Governor of Vermont: Carlos Coolidge (Whig)
- Governor of Virginia: William Smith (Democratic) (until January 1), John B. Floyd (Democratic) (starting January 1)
- Governor of Wisconsin: Nelson Dewey (Democratic)

=== Lieutenant governors ===
- Lieutenant Governor of Connecticut: Charles J. McCurdy (Whig) (until May 2), Thomas Backus (Democratic) (starting May 2)
- Lieutenant Governor of Illinois: Joseph Wells (Democratic) (until January 8), William McMurtry (Democratic) (starting January 8)
- Lieutenant Governor of Indiana: vacant (until December 5), James H. Lane (Democratic) (starting December 5)
- Lieutenant Governor of Kentucky: John LaRue Helm (Whig)
- Lieutenant Governor of Louisiana: Trasimond Landry (Whig)
- Lieutenant Governor of Massachusetts: John Reed, Jr. (political party unknown)
- Lieutenant Governor of Michigan: William M. Fenton (Democratic)
- Lieutenant Governor of Missouri: Thomas Lawson Price (Democratic)
- Lieutenant Governor of New York: George W. Patterson (Whig) (starting January 1)
- Lieutenant Governor of Rhode Island: Edward W. Lawton (political party unknown) (until May 1), Thomas Whipple (political party unknown) (starting May 1)
- Lieutenant Governor of South Carolina: William Henry Gist (Democratic)
- Lieutenant Governor of Texas: John Alexander Greer (Democratic)
- Lieutenant Governor of Vermont: Robert Pierpoint (Whig)
- Lieutenant Governor of Wisconsin: John E. Holmes (Democratic)

== Events ==
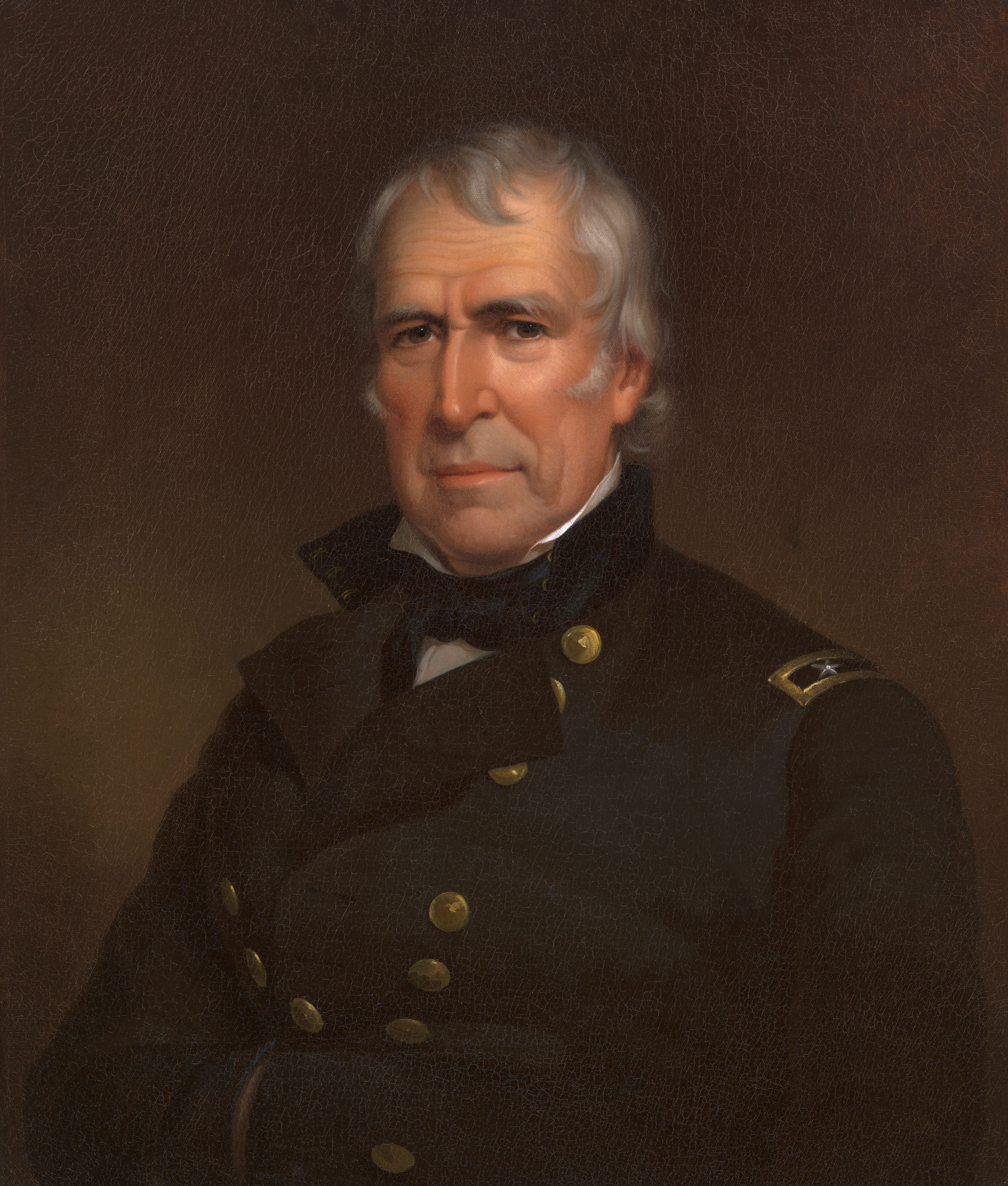
March 4: Zachary Taylor becomes the 12th U.S. president

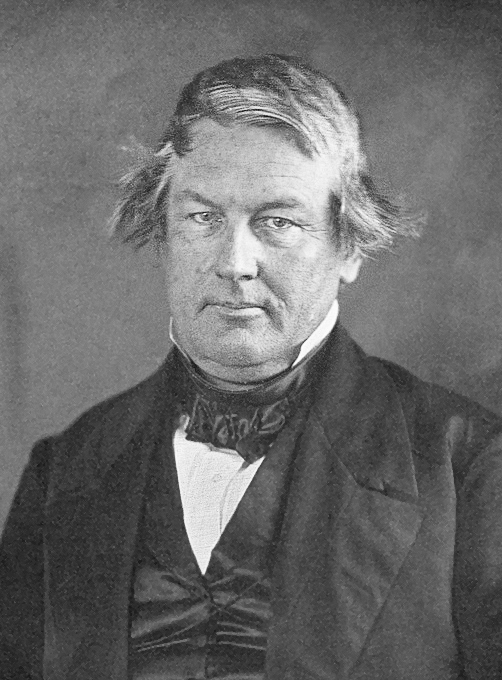
Millard Fillmore becomes the 12th U.S. vice president

- January 23 – Elizabeth Blackwell is awarded her M.D. by the Medical Institute of Geneva, New York, thus becoming the United States' first woman doctor.
- January 27
  - The Fayetteville and Western Plank Road Company is incorporated, to build a plank road from Fayetteville to Bethania, North Carolina.
  - The North Carolina General Assembly incorporates the North Carolina Railroad, to complete a rail line from Goldsboro through Raleigh, and Salisbury to Charlotte.
- February 14 – James Knox Polk becomes the first sitting president of the United States to have his photograph taken, in New York City.
- February 28 – Regular steamboat service from the west to the east coast of the United States begins with the arrival of the SS California in San Francisco Bay. The California leaves New York Harbor on October 6, 1848, rounds Cape Horn at the tip of South America, and arrives at San Francisco, California after a 4-month-21-day journey.
- March 3
  - Minnesota Territory is established.
  - The United States Department of the Interior is established.
  - The U.S. Congress passes the Gold Coinage Act allowing the minting of gold coins.
- March 4 – Zachary Taylor becomes the 12th president of the United States, and Millard Fillmore becomes the 12th vice president, but both refuse to be sworn in office on a Sabbath (Sunday). Urban legend holds that David Rice Atchison, President pro tempore of the United States Senate is President de jure for a single day.
- March 5 – President Zachary Taylor and Vice President Millard Fillmore are sworn into office.
- May 3 – The Mississippi River levee at Sauvé's Crevasse breaks, flooding much of New Orleans, Louisiana.
- May 10 – Astor Place Riot occurs in Manhattan.
- May 22 – Future President Abraham Lincoln receives a patent, for a device designed to lift boats over river obstructions.
- March 29 – Shipment containing Henry Box Brown departs Richmond for Philadelphia.
- June 6 – Fort Worth, Texas is founded.
- July 13 – Nicholas Kelly instigates the Charleston Workhouse slave rebellion in South Carolina.
- August 6 – Henry W. Collier is elected the 14th governor of Alabama.
- September 1 – The first segment of the Pennsylvania Railroad, from Lewistown, Pennsylvania to Harrisburg, Pennsylvania, opens for service.
- September 17 – Harriet Tubman emancipates herself.
- November – Austin College receives a charter in Huntsville.
- November 13 – The Constitution of California is ratified by the electorate.
- December 4 – President Zachary Taylor delivers his State of the Union Address, advocating for California and New Mexico to be admitted as free states.
- Undated – Pfizer is founded by cousins Charles Pfizer and Charles F. Erhart in Williamsburg, Brooklyn, as a manufacturer of fine chemicals.

=== Continuing ===
- California Gold Rush (January 24, 1848–1855)

== Births ==
- January 12 – Murphy J. Foster, U.S. Senator from Louisiana from 1901 to 1913 (died 1921)
- January 29 – Newton C. Blanchard, U.S. Senator from Louisiana from 1894 to 1897 (died 1922)
- March 2 – Robert Means Thompson, naval officer (died 1930)
- March 7 – Luther Burbank, biologist (died 1926)
- March 10 – Mary Evelyn Hitchcock, author and explorer (died 1920)
- March 17 – Cornelia Clapp, marine biologist (died 1934)
- April 3 – Walter Guion, U.S. Senator from Louisiana in 1918 (died 1927)
- April 17 – William R. Day, politician and Associate Justice of the Supreme Court of the United States (died 1923)
- April 19 – John Uri Lloyd, pharmacist and science fiction author (died 1936)
- April 30 – Jennie Tuttle Hobart, Second Lady of the United States as wife of Garret Hobart (died 1941)
- May 19 – John Hubbard, admiral (died 1932)
- June 30 – William Joseph Deboe, U.S. Senator from Kentucky from 1897 to 1903 (died 1927)
- July 22 – Emma Lazarus, poet (died 1887)
- August 9 – John P. Young, managing editor of the San Francisco Chronicle (died 1921)
- August 12 – Abbott Handerson Thayer, painter, naturalist and teacher (died 1921)
- August 23 – William Stanley West, U.S. Senator from Georgia in 1914 (died 1914)
- September 3 – Sarah Orne Jewett, Maine fiction writer (died 1909)
- September 18 – Martha Place, murderer (first woman executed in the electric chair, 1899)
- October 3 – Jeannette Leonard Gilder, author and editor (died 1916)
- October 7 – James Whitcomb Riley, dialect poet (died 1916)
- November 19 – Grace Denio Litchfield, poet and novelist (died 1944)
- December 6
  - Jennie Anderson Froiseth, women's rights campaigner (died 1930)
  - Charles S. Thomas, U.S. Senator from Colorado from 1913 to 1921 (died 1934)
- December 12 – William Kissam Vanderbilt, railroad magnate (died 1920)
- December 16 – Mary Hartwell Catherwood, author and poet (died 1902)
- December 19 – Henry Clay Frick, industrialist and art collector (died 1919)
- December 20
  - John W. Kern, U.S. Senator from Indiana from 1911 to 1917 (died 1917)
  - Raymond P. Rodgers, admiral (died 1925)
- Ellen Eglin, inventor
- Emma Curtis Hopkins, spiritual writer (died 1925)

== Deaths ==
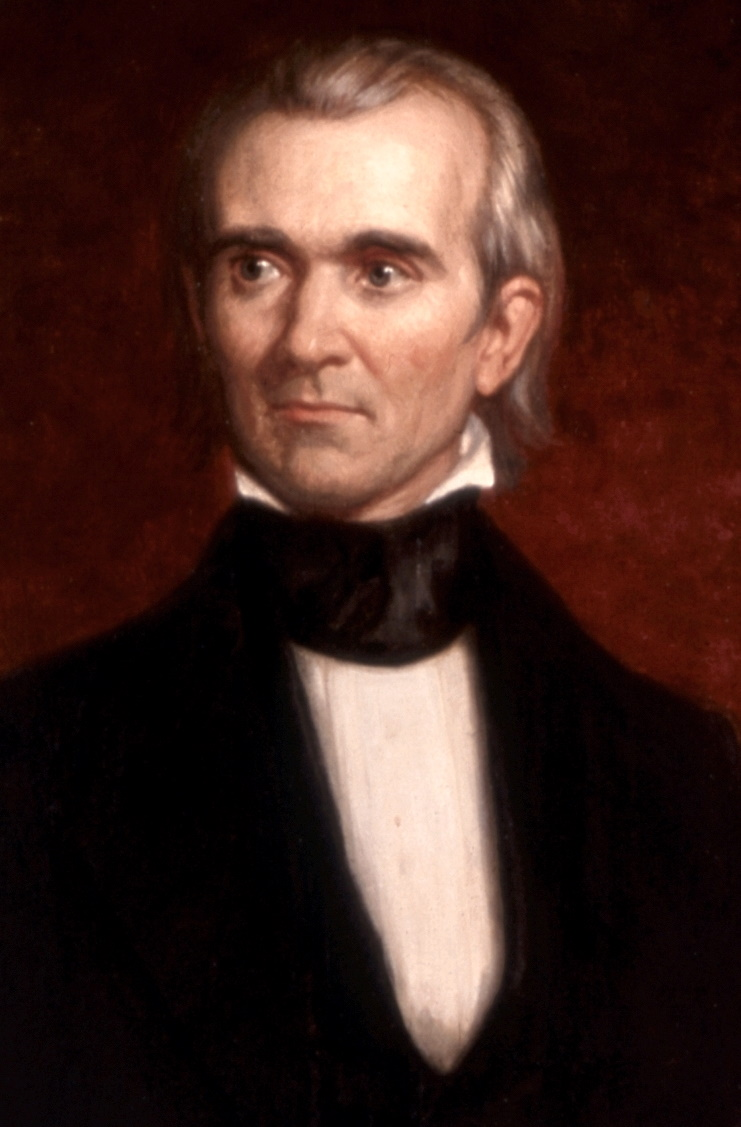
James K. Polk

- January 30 – Jonathan Alder, settler (born 1773)
- March 17 – Ann Gerry, Second Lady of the United States from 1813 to 1814 as wife of Elbridge Gerry (born 1763)
- July 12 – Dolley Madison, First Lady of the United States from 1809 to 1817 as wife of James Madison (born 1768)
- June 15 – James K. Polk, 11th president of the United States from 1845 to 1849 (born 1795)
- July 30 – Jacob Perkins, inventor, mechanical engineer, and physicist (born 1766)
- August 23 – Edward Hicks, folk painter and Quaker preacher (born 1780)
- October 7 – Edgar Allan Poe, author, poet, editor and literary critic (born 1809)
- October 22 – William Miller, Baptist preacher, leader of the Second Advent Movement (born 1782)
- Robert Cary Long, Jr., architect working in Baltimore (born 1810)

== See also ==
- Timeline of United States history (1820–1859)
