= 1853 Alabama gubernatorial election =

- August 1, 1853
- Turnout: 6.04%
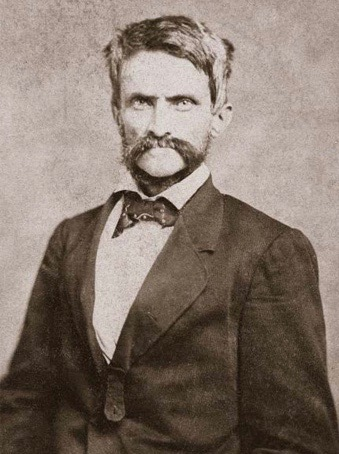

Nominee	John A. Winston	William S. Earnest	Alvis Q. Nicks
Party	Democratic	Whig	Union Democrat
Popular vote	30,116	10,157	5,763
Percentage	64.63%	21.80%	12.37%
- County results Winston: 40–50% 50–60% 60–70% 70–80% 80–90% >90% Earnest: 50–60% Nicks: 40–50% 50–60% 60–70% Unknown/No Vote
Governor before election
Henry W. Collier
Democratic
Elected Governor
John A. Winston
Democratic

The 1853 Alabama gubernatorial election took place on August 1, 1853, in order to elect the governor of Alabama. Democrat John A. Winston won his first term. Henry W. Collier did not run because he was term-limited.

== Candidates ==
=== Democratic Party ===
- John A. Winston

=== Whig Party ===
- William S. Earnest
- Richard Wilde Walker, son of Senator John Williams Walker.

=== Union Party ===
- Alvis Q. Nicks

== Election ==
1853 Alabama gubernatorial election
Party	Candidate	Votes	%
Democratic	John A. Winston	30,116	64.63
Whig	William S. Earnest	10,157	21.80
Union Democrat	Alvis Q. Nicks	5,763	12.37
Whig	Richard Wilde Walker	561	1.20
Total votes		44,318	100.00
Democratic hold			
