= Andrew B. Moore =

American politician (1807–1873)

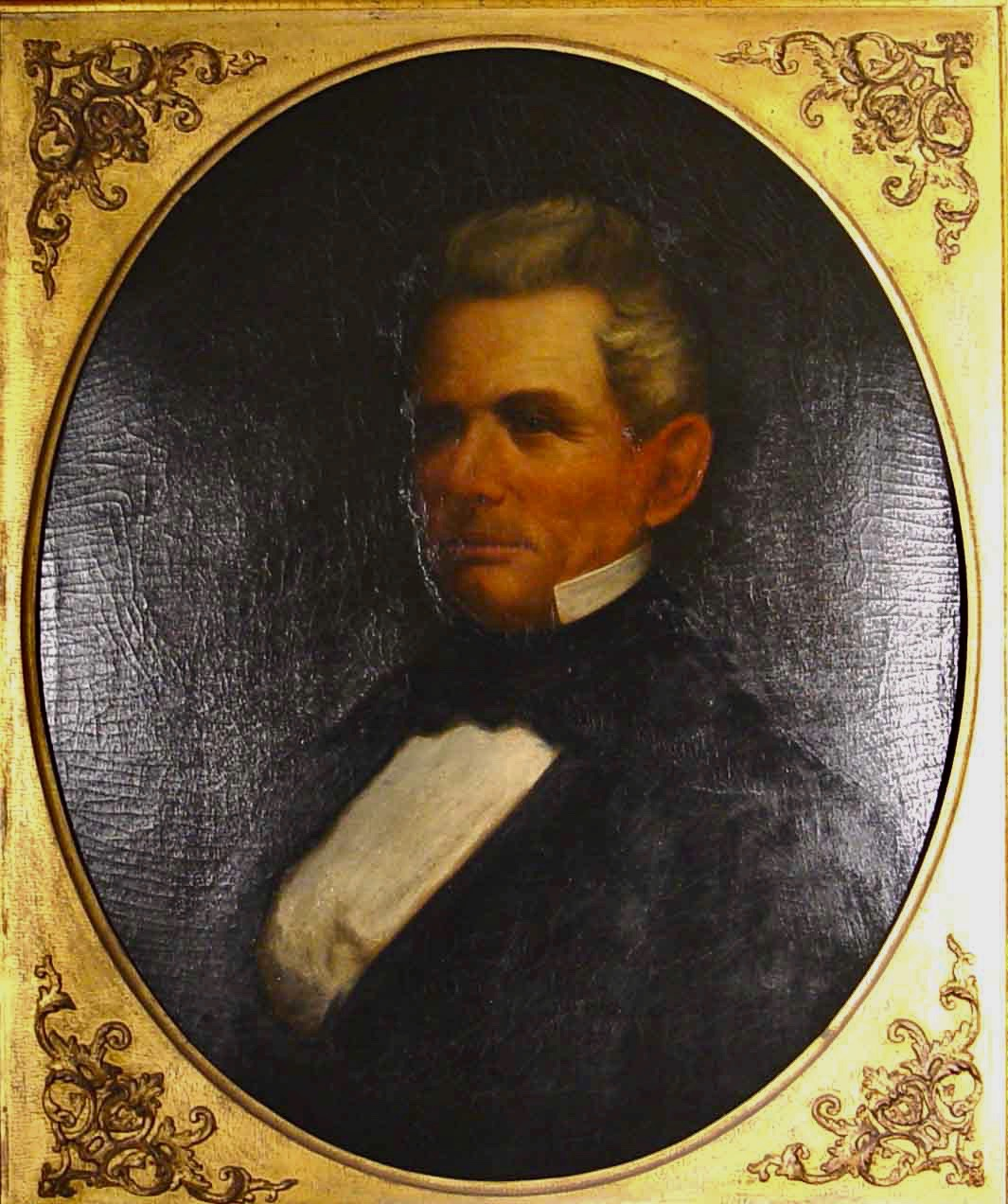

16th Governor of Alabama
- In office December 1, 1857 – December 2, 1861
- Preceded by: John A. Winston
- Succeeded by: John Gill Shorter

Personal details
- Born: Andrew Barry Moore; March 7, 1807 Spartanburg, South Carolina, US
- Died: April 5, 1873 (aged 66)
- Resting place: Fairview Cemetery, Marion, Alabama
- Party: Democratic

Andrew Barry Moore (March 7, 1807 – April 5, 1873) was the 16th governor of Alabama from 1857 to 1861 and served as Governor at the outbreak of the American Civil War.

== Early life ==
Moore was born in Spartanburg District, South Carolina, to Jane and Charles Moore, a cotton planter and veteran of the American Revolution and the War of 1812. Moore's father purchased land in Perry County, Alabama, in 1820, and his family moved there, although the younger Moore remained in school in South Carolina before joining his family in 1826.

== Early career ==
After teaching school at Marion in Perry County for two years, Moore read law, and was admitted to the bar in 1833. For eight years, he served as Justice of the Peace for Perry County.

In 1839 Moore was elected to the Alabama House of Representatives as a Democrat, reelected in 1842, and served four consecutive terms. Elected Speaker of the House in 1843, 1844, and 1845, Moore worked closely with Governor Benjamin Fitzpatrick in the liquidation of the State Bank. Moore advocated the relocation of the state capitol to Montgomery and delivered the last speech in the old Hall of the House of Representatives in Tuscaloosa.

Moore resumed his law practice in 1846. He was a presidential elector for Democratic candidate Lewis Cass in 1848. Appointed by Governor Henry W. Collier in 1851 to fill a judicial vacancy on the circuit bench, Moore served in that capacity until 1857, when he won the Democratic Party's nomination for governor against numerous pro-secession rivals. In the 1857 Alabama gubernatorial election he ran unopposed, taking office on December 1.

== Governor ==
Education and internal improvements received significant attention during Moore's first term. Construction was completed on the Alabama Insane Hospital at Tuscaloosa, and Dr. Peter Bryce was appointed its first superintendent. The Institute for the Deaf and Blind was established at Talladega. The Medical College, a branch of the University of Alabama, was established at Mobile. Moore advocated state aid supplemented by Federal land grants to promote railroad construction. He particularly favored efforts of the Alabama and Alabama River Railroad to connect the northern and southern areas of the state.

=== Secession and civil war ===
Running for reelection in the August 1859 election, Moore, considered a mainstream Democrat, easily defeated the extreme pro-secession William F. Samford. Although he had run as a pro-Union moderate, after John Brown's raid on the U.S. Arsenal at Harper's Ferry, Virginia in October of that year, Moore voiced support for a more aggressive defense of slavery in his second inaugural address. The Alabama legislature enacted a law to provide for a state military organization in February 1860. This law established a Military Commission composed of the governor, an adjutant and inspector general, a quartermaster general, and a state army of eight thousand volunteers. The legislature also approved a resolution requiring the governor, in the event of a Republican being elected president, to call for the election of delegates to a state convention to consider secession.

Following the November 1860 election of Republican Abraham Lincoln as President, Moore began taking action to prepare for secession. He urged banks to suspend specie payments and to exchange large amounts of capital for state bonds. In January, he ordered the state militia to seize the U.S. Army arsenal at Mt. Vernon and Forts Morgan and Gaines on Mobile Bay, and contributed 500 Alabama Troops to assist Florida Governor Madison S. Perry in capturing the U.S. Army forts at Pensacola.

On January 11, the state convention voted to secede from the United States, and the Alabama state capital was chosen as the temporary home of the new Southern Confederacy. When the Confederate government was organized in February 1861, Moore used his influence to help secure the election of the conservative Jefferson Davis over the more radical William Lowndes Yancey.

Despite Moore's initial preparations, military and economic problems emerged quickly, as the US Navy blockaded Mobile, Alabama's only port, and the price of salt rose from $1 to $10 per bushel. Moore's term of office expired on December 2, 1861. He was then appointed special aide-de-camp by incoming Governor John Gill Shorter, and he worked to coordinate the procurement and transportation of supplies to General Albert Sidney Johnston in northern Alabama. Following the collapse of the Confederacy in the spring of 1865, Moore was arrested by Federal troops and imprisoned at Fort Pulaski in Savannah, Georgia, with other Confederate leaders. Released in August, he returned to Marion, Alabama, and resumed law practice until his death in 1873.

== Personal life ==
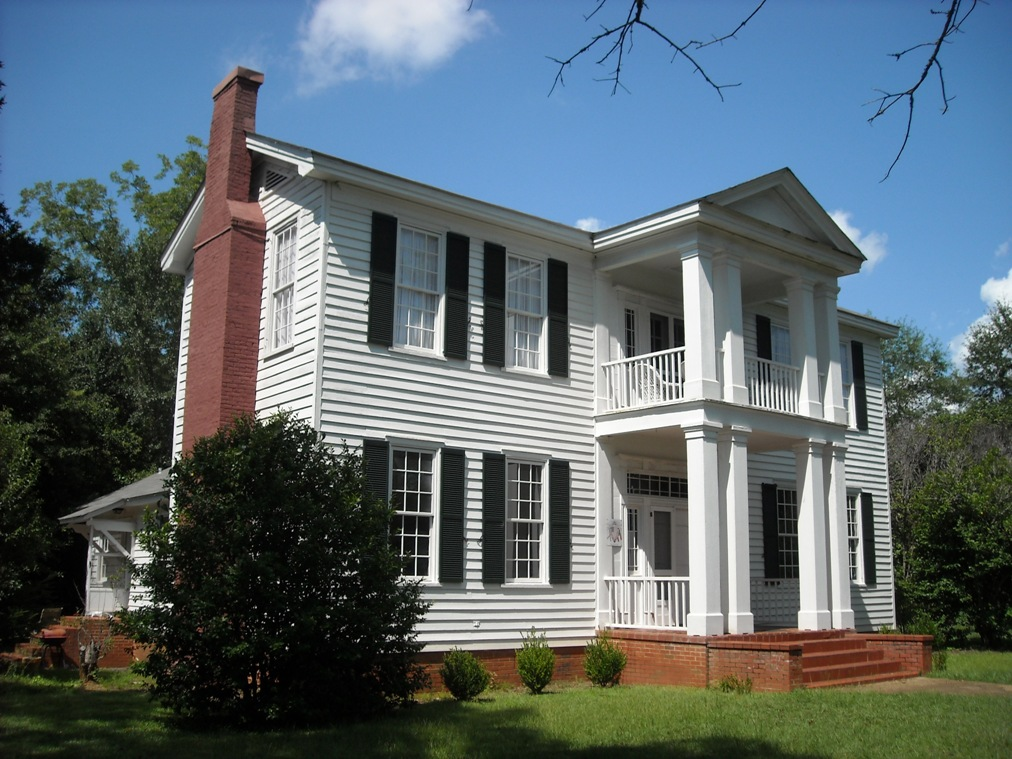
Governor Andrew Moore House

In 1837, he married Mary Goree, the daughter of a local planter. They resided in Marion, Alabama.

== Additional Sources and Online Links ==
- Andrew B. Moore in Civil War and Reconstruction Governor's Papers at the Alabama Department of Archives and History
- Andrew B. Moore at the Encyclopedia of Alabama

Party political offices
Preceded by John A. Winston	Democratic nominee for Governor of Alabama; 1857, 1859	Succeeded by John Gill Shorter
Political offices
Preceded by John A. Winston	Governor of Alabama; 1857–1861	Succeeded by John Gill Shorter
