= 1857 Alabama gubernatorial election =

- August 3, 1857
- Turnout: 5.74%
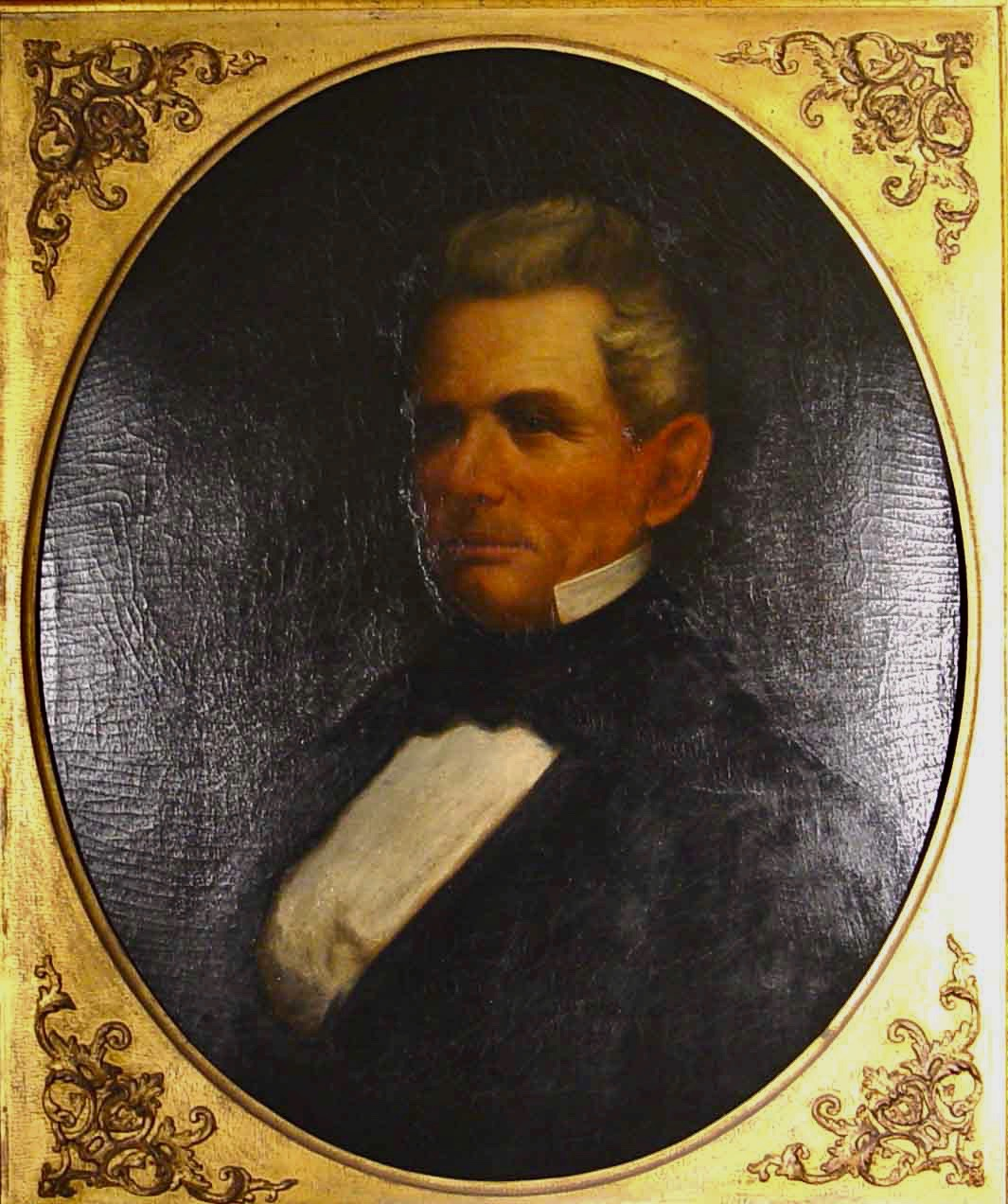
Nominee	Andrew B. Moore
Party	Democratic
Popular vote	41,871
Percentage	94.48%
- County results Moore: 80–90% >90% Unknown/No Vote
Governor before election
John A. Winston
Democratic
Elected Governor
Andrew B. Moore
Democratic

The 1857 Alabama gubernatorial election took place on August 3, 1857, in order to elect the governor of Alabama. Democrat Andrew B. Moore won his first term as governor. Moore ran unopposed in the general election. Incumbent John A. Winston did not run because he was term-limited.

== Democratic primary ==
=== Governor ===
==== Candidates ====
- Andrew B. Moore

Moore won the nomination after 26 ballots in a contest between several candidates. Moore supported states' rights but, at the time, believed the South's grievances did not justify disunion. His nomination and eventual election was seen as the moderate, non-secessionist choice of Alabama voters.

== Candidates ==
=== Democratic Party ===
- Andrew B. Moore, Alabama House Speaker

== Election ==
1857 Alabama gubernatorial election
Party	Candidate	Votes	%
Democratic	Andrew B. Moore	41,871	94.48
Write-in		2,447	5.52
Total votes		44,318	100.00
Democratic hold			
