= Bailey Springs, Alabama =

Unincorporated community in Alabama, United States

- Unincorporated community
- Location within Alabama Location within the United States
- Coordinates: 34°53′44″N 87°34′17″W
- Country: United States
- State: Alabama
- County: Lauderdale
- Elevation: 525 ft (160 m)
- Time zone: UTC-6 (Central (CST))
  - Summer (DST): UTC-5 (CDT)
- Area codes: 256 & 938
- GNIS feature ID: 113361

Bailey Springs, also known as Chalybeate Springs, is an unincorporated community in Lauderdale County, Alabama, United States.

== History ==
A post office was established at Bailey Springs in 1854, and remained in operation until it was discontinued in 1901. The community was named for Jonathan Bailey, who started a resort on several mineral springs. The spring waters here have been classified as chalybeate, iron water, and alkaline-saline springs. A large number of people came from Memphis and surrounding areas for the purported healing qualities of the springs. At one point, the water at Bailey Springs was bottled and shipped around the United States. The springs were opened as a resort and hotel until 1910. A school for women, Bailey Springs University, was founded in 1893 on the resort grounds. It remained open until 1900.

During the American Civil War, troops from the 7th Illinois Volunteer Infantry Regiment under the command of Colonel Richard Rowett camped at Bailey Springs.

== Notable person ==
Henry W. Collier, the 14th Governor of Alabama, died at Bailey Springs on August 28, 1855.
