= 1855 Alabama gubernatorial election =

- August 6, 1855
- Turnout: 9.85%
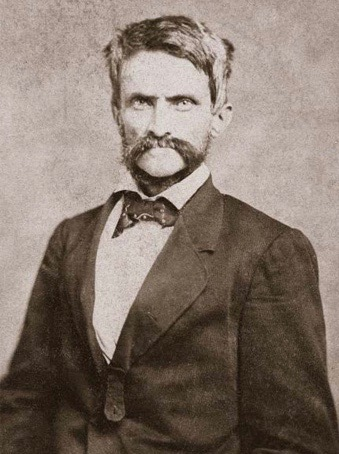

Nominee	John A. Winston	George Shortridge
Party	Democratic	Know Nothing
Popular vote	43,930	32,086
Percentage	57.79%	42.21%
- County results Winston: 50–60% 60–70% 70–80% 80–90% >90% Shortridge: 50–60% 60–70% 70–80%
Governor before election
John A. Winston
Democratic
Elected Governor
John A. Winston
Democratic

The 1855 Alabama gubernatorial election was held on August 6, in order to elect the governor of Alabama. incumbent governor John A. Winston won his second term as governor.

== Candidates ==
=== Democratic Party ===
- John A. Winston

=== Know Nothing ===
At the time, the Know Nothing Party was known as the American Party.

- George D. Shortridge

== Election ==
1855 Alabama gubernatorial election
Party	Candidate	Votes	%
Democratic	John A. Winston (incumbent)	43,930	57.79
Know Nothing	George D. Shortridge	32,086	42.21
Total votes		44,318	100.00
Democratic hold			
