= 1851 Alabama gubernatorial election =

- August 4, 1851
- Turnout: 5.66%
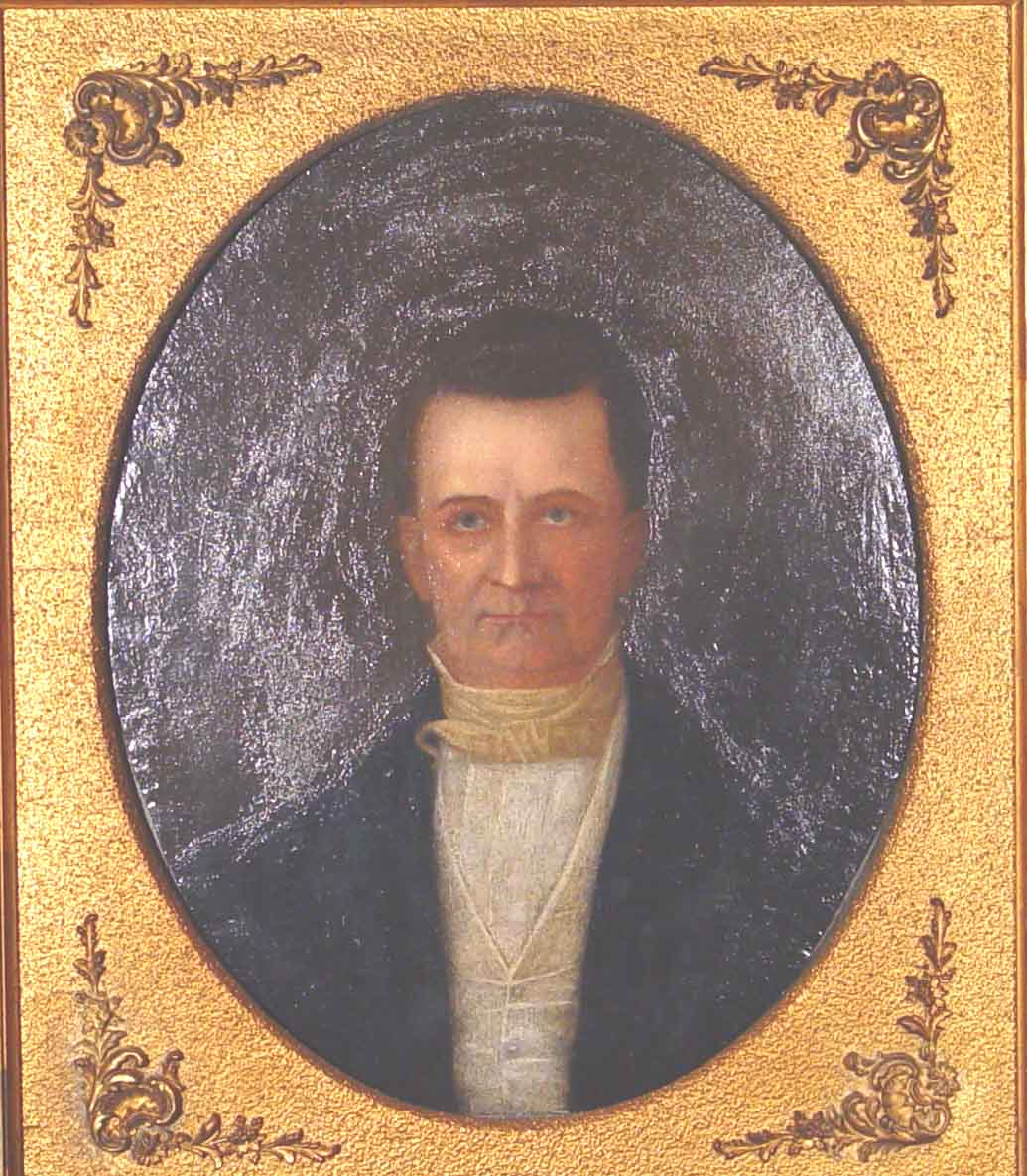

Nominee	Henry W. Collier	James Shields
Party	Democratic	Whig
Popular vote	37,480	5,749
Percentage	85.76%	13.16%
- Collier: 50–60% 60–70% 70–80% 80–90% >90% Shields: 50–60% Unknown/No Vote
Governor before election
Henry W. Collier
Democratic
Elected Governor
Henry W. Collier
Democratic

The 1851 Alabama gubernatorial election took place on August 4, 1851, in order to elect the governor of Alabama. Democrat Henry W. Collier won his second term by a 72.60% margin.

== Candidates ==
=== Democratic Party ===
- Henry W. Collier, incumbent
- William Lowndes Yancey, representative of Alabama's 3rd congressional district from 1844 to 1846.
- Nathaniel Terry, narrowly lost in the 1845 election.

=== Whig Party ===
- James Shields

== Election ==
1851 Alabama gubernatorial election
Party	Candidate	Votes	%	±%
Democratic	Henry W. Collier (incumbent)	37,480	85.76%	−12.42%
Whig	James Shields	5,749	13.16%	+13.16%
Write-in		473	1.08%	-0.74%
Total votes		46,097	100.00%	N/A
Democratic hold				
