= 1859 Alabama gubernatorial election =

- August 1, 1859
- Turnout: 9.40%
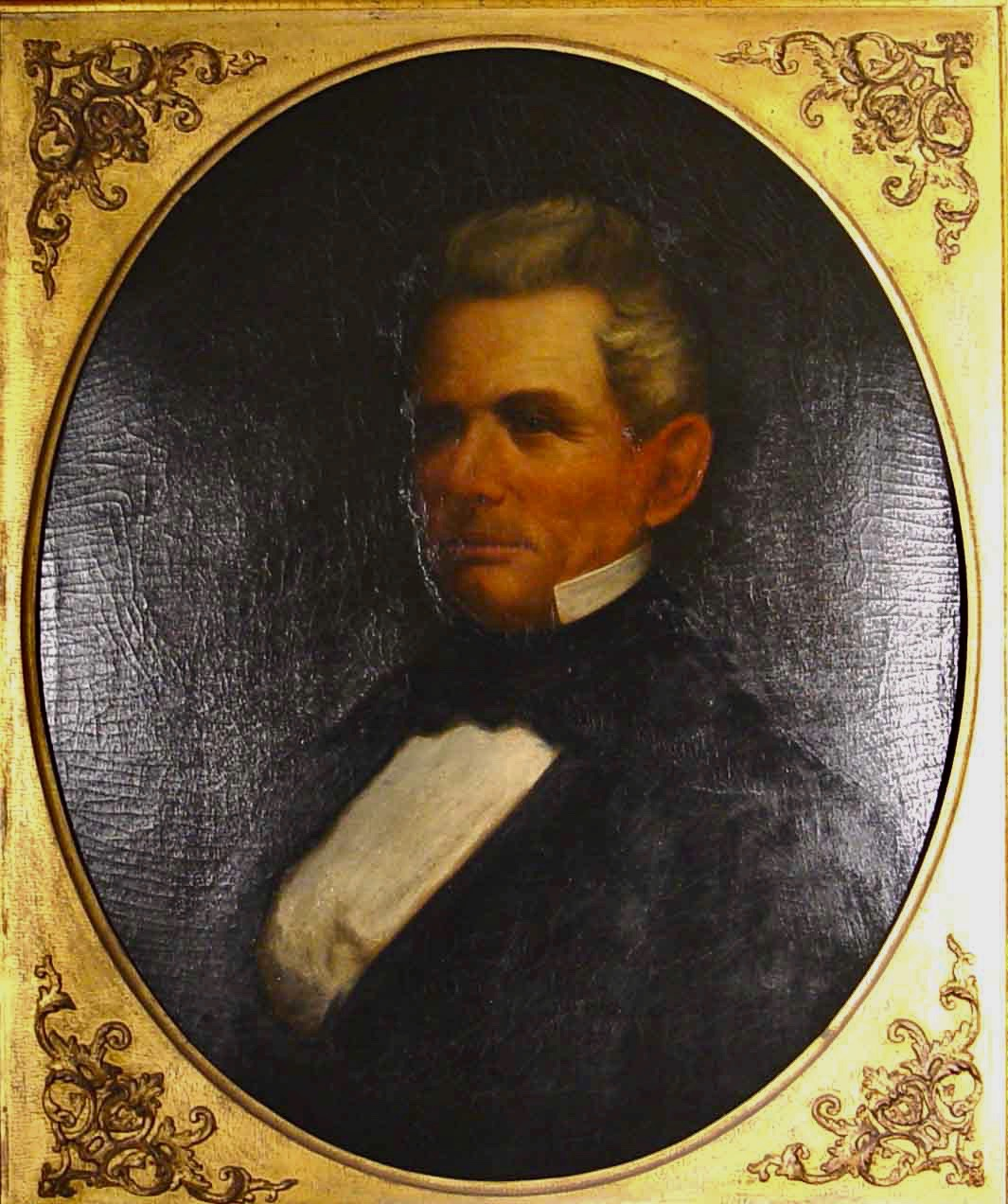

Nominee	Andrew B. Moore	William F. Samford
Party	Democratic	Southern Rights Democrat
Popular vote	52,786	19,745
Percentage	72.78%	27.22%
- County results Moore: 50–60% 60–70% 70–80% 80–90% >90% Samford: 50–60%
Governor before election
Andrew B. Moore
Democratic
Elected Governor
Andrew B. Moore
Democratic

The 1859 Alabama gubernatorial election took place on August 1, 1859, in order to elect the governor of Alabama. Democrat Andrew B. Moore won his second term as governor.

== Candidates ==
=== Democratic Party ===
- Andrew B. Moore, incumbent Governor

=== Southern Rights Democrat ===
- William F. Samford, candidate, most likely the father of William J. Samford

== Election results ==
1859 Alabama gubernatorial election
Party	Candidate	Votes	%
Democratic	Andrew B. Moore (incumbent)	52,786	72.777
Southern Rights Democrat	William F. Samford	19,745	27.223
Total votes		72,531	100.00
Democratic hold			

=== By county ===
County	Andrew B. Moore		William F. Samford	
County	Votes	%	Votes	%
Autauga	665	57.776	486	42.224
Baldwin	284	71.898	111	28.101
Barbour	1,006	58.693	708	41.307
Bibb	847	86.428	133	13.571
Blount	444	40.363	656	59.636
Butler	927	57.151	695	42.848
Calhoun	2,291	95.221	115	4.779
Chambers	1,040	51.536	978	48.464
Cherokee	1,776	91.973	155	8.027
Clarke	912	89.588	106	10.412
Coffee	715	70.932	293	29.068
Conecuh	534	66.666	267	33.333
Coosa	1,311	60.779	846	39.221
Covington	286	49.567	291	50.433
Dale	779	59.060	540	40.940
Dallas	913	76.338	283	23.662
DeKalb	1,412	97.988	29	2.012
Fayette	1,089	75.311	357	24.689
Franklin	1,424	79.776	361	20.224
Greene	1,013	100.000	0	0
Henry	638	54.623	530	45.377
Jackson	1,948	96.245	76	3.755
Jefferson	1,070	79.260	280	20.740
Lauderdale	1,174	93.397	83	6.603
Lawrence	783	86.520	122	13.480
Limestone	746	86.744	114	13.256
Lowndes	786	55.904	620	44.096
Macon	1,043	48.086	1,126	51.914
Madison	1,511	98.117	29	1.883
Marengo	815	75.955	258	24.045
Marion	921	87.714	129	12.286
Marshall	1,078	92.058	93	7.942
Mobile	2,047	61.343	1,290	38.657
Monroe	599	73.049	221	26.951
Montgomery	1,225	50.143	1,218	49.857
Morgan	1,061	86.120	171	13.880
Perry	1,170	92.636	93	7.364
Pickens	1,267	90.114	139	9.886
Pike	1,383	60.818	891	39.182
Randolph	1,423	74.269	493	25.731
Russell	960	51.696	897	48.304
Shelby	1,164	87.849	161	12.151
St. Clair	1,160	92.874	89	7.126
Sumter	620	84.469	114	15.531
Talladega	1,380	72.289	529	27.711
Tallapoosa	1,644	55.729	1,306	44.271
Tuscaloosa	1,185	72.212	456	27.788
Walker	439	63.623	251	36.377
Washington	230	83.941	44	16.059
Wilcox	632	77.642	182	22.358
Winston	266	74.510	91	25.490
Total	52,786	72.777	19,745	27.223
