= Phillip Roddey =

Confederate Army general

Philip Dale Roddey
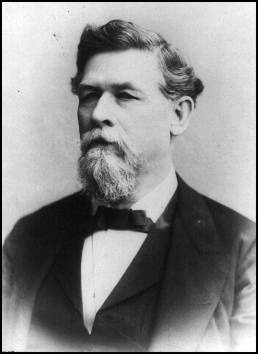
- Born: April 2, 1826; Moulton, Alabama
- Died: July 20, 1897 (aged 71); London, England
- Military career
- Allegiance: Confederate States of America
- Branch: Confederate States Army
- Service years: 1861–1865
- Rank: Brigadier General
- Nickname: Defender of North Alabama
- Commands: 4th Alabama Cavalry Regiment; Roddey's Cavalry Brigade
- Conflicts: American Civil War: Battle of Shiloh; Battle of Brices Cross Roads; Battle of Selma
- Other work: Commission merchant

Philip Dale Roddey (April 2, 1826 – July 20, 1897) was a brigadier general in the army of the Confederate States of America during the American Civil War.

== Biography ==
Roddey was born in Moulton, Lawrence County, Alabama, to Philip and Sarah Roddey. His father, a saddler, had moved his family to Alabama from eastern Tennessee. Philip D. Roddey's birth year is usually given as 1826, which is on his tombstone. However, census records show him as several years older, and in fact his father had been shot and killed in an altercation in Moulton in 1824. Roddey's widowed mother raised her 3 children as best she could, but Roddey received little formal education. He was a tailor in Moulton before he was appointed sheriff of Lawrence County in 1846, serving at least until 1852. He then purchased a steamboat, which he ran on the Tennessee River. He married Margaret A. McGaughey and had a son and a daughter.

== War years ==
When the American Civil War began, Roddey, who had not supported secession, sought to remain out of it. After the fall of Fort Henry, Tennessee, to Ulysses S. Grant in February 1862, however, Union gunboats were able to sail as far as Florence, Alabama, where the shallows at Muscle Shoals stopped them. Rather than allow his steamboat to be seized and used by the enemy, Roddey burned her. He then raised a cavalry company, which he led at the Battle of Shiloh in April 1862.

Roddey was active with his company during the advance on Corinth, Mississippi, General Braxton Bragg writing on May 4, 1862, that "Roddey is invaluable". On August 21, 1862, Bragg – now in Chattanooga – wrote, ""A portion of our cavalry, consisting of the companies of Captains Earle, Lewis, and Roddey, led by Captain Roddey, has made another brilliant dash upon a superior force of the enemy, resulting in the capture of 123 prisoners." In October 1862, Roddey accordingly was authorized to increase his command to a regiment, the 4th Alabama Cavalry. Roddey was now a colonel. Roddey's regiment would serve under both Nathan Bedford Forrest and Joseph Wheeler, principally in Tennessee and Alabama.

In December 1862, the 5th Alabama Cavalry Regiment was brigaded with Roddey's 4th Alabama Regiment, and Roddey was named the commander of the District of Northern Alabama. Later, the 10th Alabama Cavalry Regiment added to his command, as was a Georgia horse artillery battery.

Promoted to brigadier general, Roddey led his cavalry brigade thereafter mainly in support of Forrest. Roddey's men were armed with rifle-muskets rather than carbines, and as such are often regarded to as mounted infantry rather than true cavalry; they generally fought dismounted. Much of the time they were stationed in their own home area, and Roddey is thus called the "Defender of North Alabama".

Roddey fought a delaying action against Grenville Dodge during Abel D. Streight's 1863 raid across Alabama and Georgia.

In April 1864, Roddey's brigade was transferred to the Department of Alabama, Mississippi, and East Louisiana., and remained in Alabama during John Bell Hood's 1864 Nashville campaign. After Hood's failure, Roddey joined Forrest in trying desperately to stop Union General James H. Wilson's cavalry raid into south Alabama in March 1865. Roddey's command fought for the last time in April at the Battle of Selma, where Forrest's men were overpowered by the more numerous and better armed Union horse soldiers. Most of Roddey command was captured at Selma. The remainder surrendered at Pond Springs (now Wheeler), Alabama, in May 1865.

== Post-war ==
After the war, Roddey moved with his family to Tuscaloosa, Alabama. He later relocated in New York City, where he became a successful commission merchant. He moved to London, England, for business reasons in the early 1890s, dying there in 1897.

== Scandal ==
Recent research on Roddey (2016) has turned up a serious scandal in his life. In 1868, he supposedly wed a young woman, twenty years his junior, named Carlotta Frances Shotwell of New Jersey. She was 22 and quite wealthy from investments of monies from her deceased father's estate. She later claimed her personal estate was worth $200,000 to $300,000, which is the equivalent of $3.5 million to over $5 million in 2015.

Roddey told Shotwell that by signing some legal documents, they would be legally wed under New York state law, but that they would keep the marriage secret and have no religious ceremony until later. He claimed that the reasons for this were due to control over his finances by another party. Roddey was reportedly very charming, persuasive, and he had connections in Washington, including with recently elected president Ulysses S. Grant.

During a trip to Chicago in 1874 with associates of Roddey, Shotwell found that railroad bonds had been stolen from her luggage, as were other important papers including those that purportedly proved her marriage to Roddey. She reported it to the police and two men were arrested. She told the detective in the case:

"I am Carlotta Frances Shotwell. I am 28 years old and a native of New Jersey. I spend most of my time in New York and Washington, but travel a good deal, as my business affairs require. I arrived in Chicago this morning from New York, and was on my way to Mobile, Ala., where I had business in connection with some bonds of the Selma and Gulf Railroad which I own. On my arrival here I registered at the Tremont house and had my luggage sent to that hotel. A few hours after I reached the city I had occasion to open my trunk, and found that the lock had been broken. On examination of the contents I found a package containing bonds of the Selma and Gulf Railroad to the amount of $54,000, together with other valuable private papers and correspondence, had been stolen."

Roddey, however, was part of the plot. Despite telling Shotwell, whom he introduced everywhere as his wife, that he was still in love with her and making all kinds of stories to protect himself, he could not hide the fact that his associates were under a cloud of suspicion. When Shotwell pressed the case, Roddey had her arrested for grand larceny...for stealing a pair of binoculars.

Shotwell was arrested and spent weeks before her trial in the Tombs, the colloquial name for the Manhattan Detention Facility. She was also charged with perjury for stating that she was married to Roddey.

During the trial, the media had a field day. The courtroom was filled over capacity every day, according to the New York Times. Roddey denied the marriage. It came out during the trial, however, that Roddey was not only a bigamist, having abandoned his wife in Alabama, but an adulterer as well. Shotwell found love letters among her husband's effects.

Eventually, Shotwell was acquitted but did not get her money back. She wrote a book about her experience in 1878, recently discovered, titled A General Betrayal: The Sufferings and Trials of Carlotta Frances Roddey. In the book, Shotwell states that Roddey was eventually charged with defrauding the U.S. government. He fled to London, where he died July 19, 1897. His body was returned to Tuscaloosa, Alabama, for burial.

== See also ==
- List of American Civil War generals (Confederate)
- Collier-Overby House, Roddey's post-war residence in Tuscaloosa, on the National Register of Historic Places
