= Collier–Overby House =

Historic house in Alabama, United States

- U.S. National Register of Historic Places
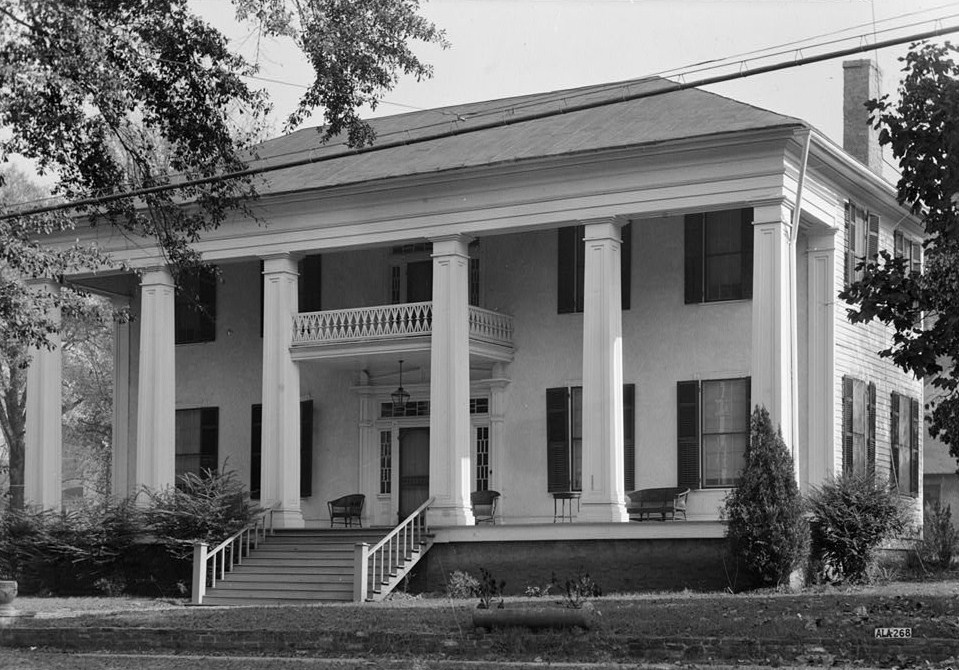
- HABS image, 1936

- Location within Alabama Location within the United States
- Location: SE corner of 9th St. and 21st Ave., Tuscaloosa, Alabama
- Coordinates: 33°12′25″N 87°33′44″W
- Area: less than one acre
- Built: 1820
- Architectural style: Greek Revival, Federal
- NRHP reference No.: 71000107
- Added to NRHP: July 14, 1971

The Collier–Overby House is a historic house located in Tuscaloosa, Alabama.

== Description and history ==
It was built in the 1820s by James Walker. The colonnaded Greek Revival house was bought by Henry W. Collier, who became chief justice of the Alabama Supreme Court and in 1849 became the Governor of Alabama, serving two terms. Following the American Civil War the house was occupied by former Confederate General Phillip Dale Roddey. After a number of other transactions the house became the headquarters of the Associated Charities of Tuscaloosa before returning to private ownership.

The two-story frame house rests on a brick foundation with a two-story columned portico across the entire front of the house. The façade under the portico is stuccoed, while the other elevations have wood siding. A small balcony with elaborate railing details covers the front door. The house and portico are capped by a hipped roof. As originally built the house was one-room deep with a center hall.

It was listed on the National Register of Historic Places on July 14, 1971.
