= 8th Alabama Infantry Regiment =

Infantry regiment of the Confederate States Army

- Flag of Alabama in 1861 (obverse and reverse)
- Active: June 10, 1861, to April 1865
- Country: Confederate States of America
- Branch: Confederate States Army
- Type: Infantry
- Engagements: Battle of Seven Pines; Battle of Williamsburg; Second Battle of Bull Run; Battle of Antietam; Battle of Fredericksburg; Battle of Chancellorsville; Battle of Gettysburg; Siege of Petersburg; Battle of Appomattox Court House

Commanders
- Notable commanders: Col. John Anthony Winston; Col. Hilary A. Herbert

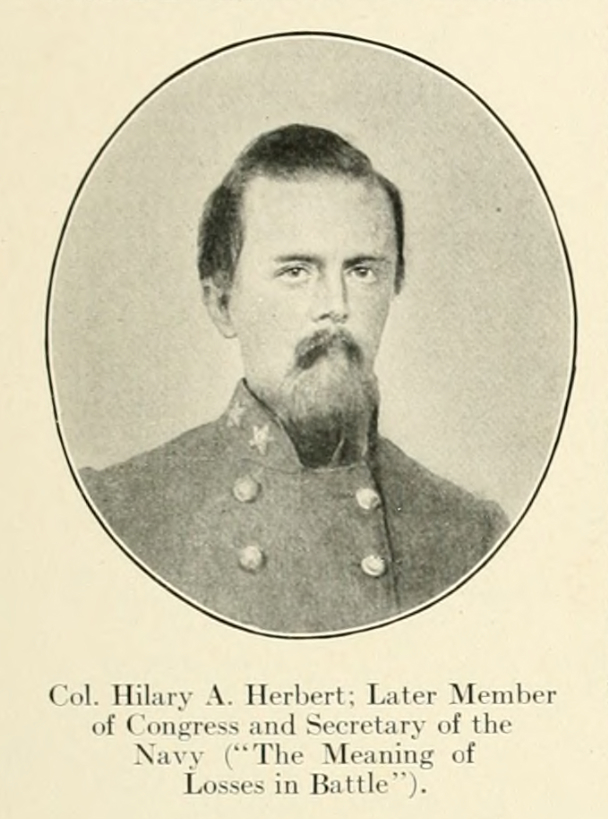
Col. Hilary A. Herbert

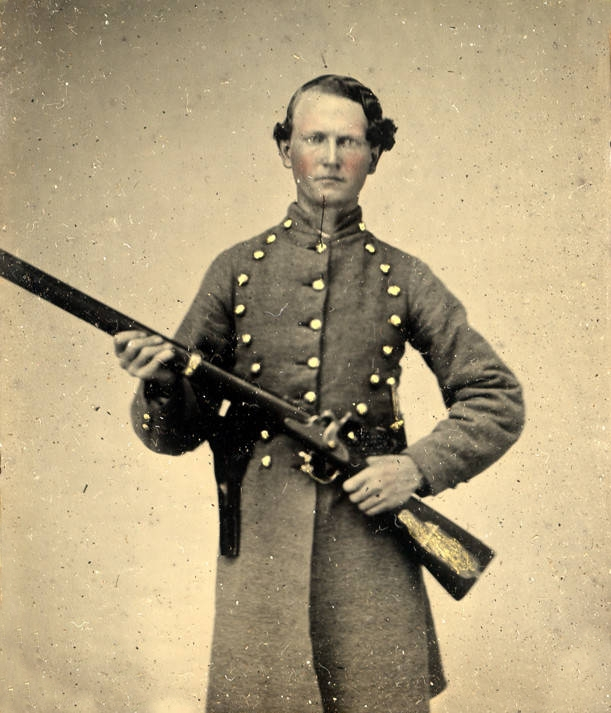
Private James Elias Pilgreen, Company K, 8th Alabama Infantry

The 8th Alabama Infantry Regiment was an infantry regiment that served in the Confederate Army during the American Civil War.

== Service ==
The 8th Alabama Infantry Regiment was mustered in at Richmond, Virginia, on June 10, 1861.

The regiment surrendered at Appomattox Court House.

== Total strength and casualties ==
The 8th mustered 1377 men during its existence. It suffered approximately 300 killed in action or mortally wounded and 170 men who died of disease, for a total of approximately 470 fatalities. An additional 236 men were discharged or transferred from the regiment.

== Commanders ==
- Colonel John Anthony Winston
- Colonel Young Lea Royston
- Colonel Hilary Abner Herbert

== See also ==
- List of Confederate units from Alabama
