= 1849 Alabama gubernatorial election =

- August 6, 1849
- Turnout: 6.43%
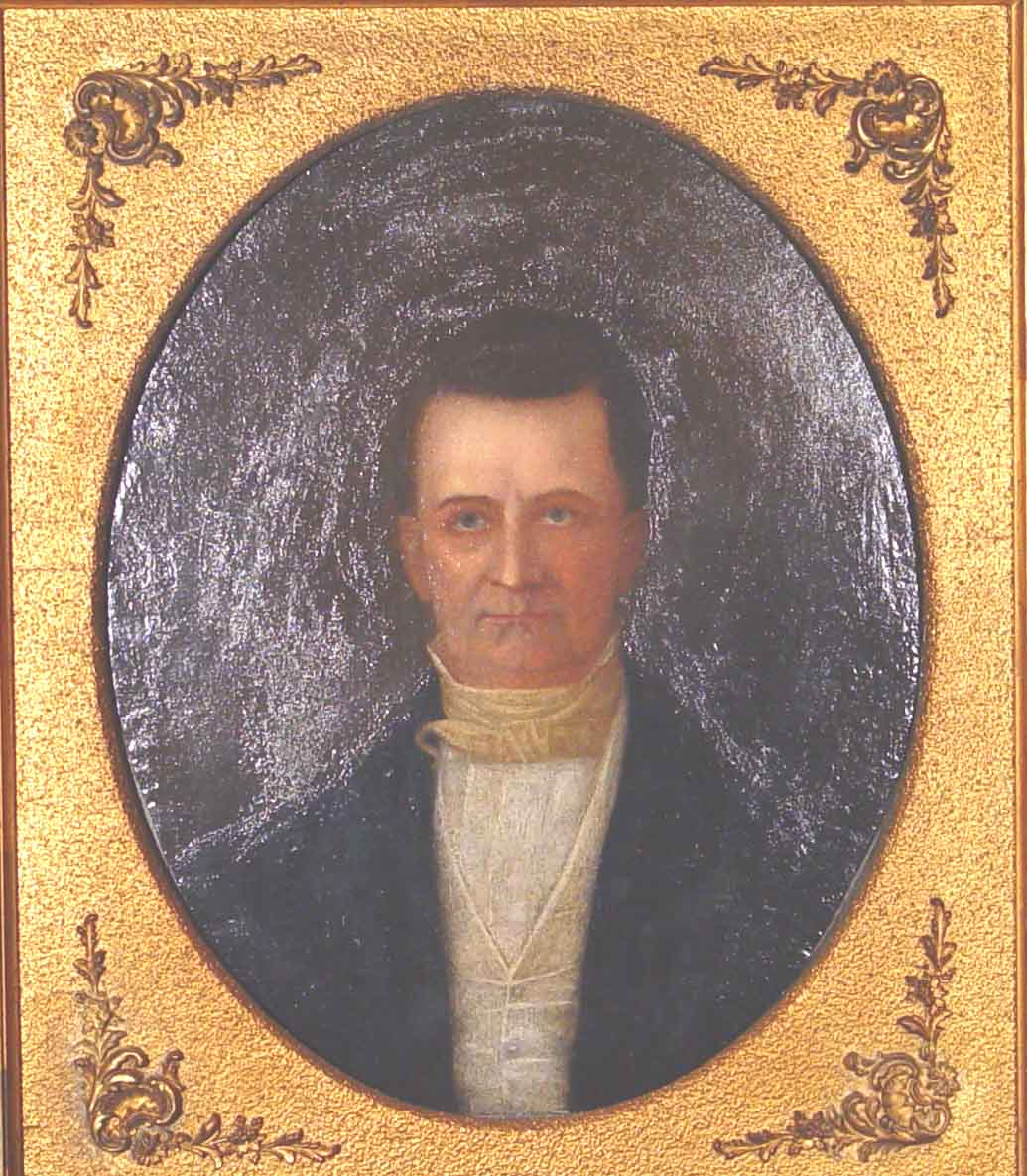
Nominee	Henry W. Collier
Party	Democratic
Popular vote	37,281
Percentage	98.18%
- County results Collier: 70–80% 80–90% >90% Unknown/No Vote
Governor before election
Reuben Chapman
Democratic
Elected Governor
Henry W. Collier
Democratic

The 1849 Alabama gubernatorial election took place on August 6, 1849, in order to elect the governor of Alabama. Democrat Henry W. Collier won his first term with over 98.18% of the votes.

== Candidates ==
=== Democratic Party ===
- Henry W. Collier, Chief Justice of the Alabama Supreme Court from 1837 to 1849.

== Election ==
Alabama gubernatorial election, 1849
Party	Candidate	Votes	%	±%
Democratic	Henry W. Collier	37,281	98.18%	+41.34%
Write-in		692	1.82%	+1.82%
Total votes		37,973	100%	N/A
Democratic hold				
