= John Holter =

Medical inventor (1916–2003)

John William Holter
- Born: April 1, 1916
- Died: December 22, 2003 (aged 87)
- Occupations: toolmaker, inventor
- Employer: Holter-Hausner International
- Known for: Spitz-Holter valve
- Spouse: Mary Holter
- Children: Charles Case "Casey" Holter

John William Holter (April 1, 1916 – December 22, 2003) was a toolmaker working for the Yale and Town Lock Company Stamford Connecticut. His son Casey Holter was born on November 7, 1955, with a severe form of spina bifida. Shortly after birth, he contracted meningitis, which caused his head to expand rapidly. His parents were told that he had developed "water on the brain" or hydrocephalus.

Holter's son was being treated in Philadelphia, at the Children's Hospital of Philadelphia. Here, surgeons Frank Nulsen and Eugene Spitz had already demonstrated that a ventricle-to-atrium diversion system could work. They needed was an inexpensive and practical valve that could control the direction of the flow and maintain normal cranial pressure.

A chance discovery showed Holter, after a failed attempt in which a young boy died, that he could use a silicone one-way valve (pressure sealing). After a medically suitable grade of Silastic (silicone rubber) was found, the device was patented, and John Holter set up a company, Holter-Hausner International, to manufacture the cerebral shunts.

Although he was unable to save his son Casey, his design, the Spitz-Holter valve (also called the Spitz-Holter shunt) continues to help millions around the world since the late 1950s.
