= Jack Hamm =

American cartoonist

- Born: March 5, 1916 Wichita, Kansas, USA
- Died: December 22, 1996 (aged 80) Dallas, Texas, USA
- Area: Cartoonist
- Notable works: How-to-draw books, The New Testament from 26 Translations, editorial cartoons
- Spouse: Dorisnel Hamm Sims
- Children: Dawna Walsh, Monty Hamm, Charlotte Flowers, Jerry Hamm

Jack Beaumont Hamm (March 5, 1916 – December 22, 1996) was an American artist from Wichita, Kansas who is recognized both for his Christian-themed artwork and editorial cartoons, and for his books on drawing technique. He both studied and taught at the Frederic Mizen Academy of Art. As a cartoonist and comic strip letterer, he worked on the Bugs Bunny, Alley Oop, and Boots and Her Buddies comic strips before attending Baylor University to study theology. He taught at Baylor both before and after he graduated in 1948.

Hamm started drawing at 5 years old. He attended Frederick Mizen Academy of Art c. 1936-1941. After finding success in cartoons, he was offered the chance to publish his own creation, but turned that down in order to study ministry at Baylor University from 1945 to 1948.

Hamm hosted an early TV drawing program, The Jack Hamm Show, in Texas and conceived of what became The New Testament from 26 Translations, published by Zondervan. His work drew praise from such diverse individuals as Peanuts creator Charles M. Schulz, Norman Vincent Peale, and FBI director J. Edgar Hoover. By the end of his life, Jack Hamm's artwork could be found in over 25 books. His papers are stored at Baylor University.

== Select bibliography ==
=== Teaching books ===
- Drawing the Head and Figure, Perigree Trade, first copyright 1962 ISBN 0-399-50791-4
- Cartooning the Head and Figure, Perigree Trade, first copyright 1967 ISBN 0-399-50803-1
- Drawing Toward God, Introduction by Charles M. Schulz, Droke House, c1968 Library of Congress Catalog: 68-16896
- How to Draw Animals, Perigree Trade, first copyright 1969 ISBN 0-399-50802-3
- Drawing Scenery: Landscapes and Seascapes, Penguin Group, Perigree Series, first copyright 1972 ISBN 0-399-50806-6
- First Lessons in Drawing and Painting, Perigree Trade, ISBN 0-399-51478-3, originally named Still Life Drawing and Painting, Penguin Group(USA), c1976 ISBN 0-399-50801-5

=== Illustrations ===
- Pornography: The Sexual Mirage by John W. Drakeford, c1973, ISBN 0-8407-5051-X
- Did Genesis Man Conquer Space, by Emil Gaverluk, c1974, ISBN 0-8407-5553-8
- I, Golgotha by James R. Adams, c1987, ISBN 0-9618060-0-1
- Robed in Light by Alexandria Uriel, c1990, ISBN 0-9624130-0-3
