= Merchant Marine Act of 1916 (Alexander Act) =

- Other short titles: Alexander Act; Shipping Act of 1916
- Long title: An Act To establish a United States Shipping Board for the purpose of encouraging, developing, and creating a naval auxiliary and naval reserve and a merchant marine to meet the requirements of the commerce of the United States with its Territories and possessions and with foreign countries; to regulate carriers by water engaged in the foreign and interstate commerce of the United States; and for other purposes
- Enacted by: the 64th United States Congress
- Effective: September 7, 1916

Citations
- Public law: Public Law 64-260
- Statutes at Large: 39 Stat. 728

Legislative history
- Introduced in the House of Representatives as H.R. 15455 by Joshua W. Alexander (D‑MO) on May 8, 1916; Committee consideration by House Committee on Merchant Marine and Fisheries; Passed the House of Representatives on May 20, 1916 (211–161); Passed the Senate on August 18, 1916 (38–21); Reported by the joint conference committee on August 19 – August 29, 1916; agreed to by the House of Representatives on August 30, 1916 (Voice vote) and by the Senate on August 31, 1916 (Voice vote); Signed into law by President Woodrow Wilson on September 7, 1916

Major amendments
- Merchant Marine Act of 1920 (Jones Act)

United States Supreme Court cases
- Federal Maritime Board v. Isbrandtsen Co. (1958)

The Merchant Marine Act of 1916 (also known as the Alexander Act) was passed by the US Congress in 1916 to create the US Shipping Board. The bill was sponsored by Representative Joshua W. Alexander (D) of Missouri, who was Chairman of the House Merchant Marine Committee. The act signified the birth of the modern American merchant marine.

== Purpose ==
The purpose of the United States Shipping Board was to develop water transportation, operate the merchant ships owned by the government, regulate the water carriers engaged in commerce under the US flag, and enforce the La Follette Seamen's Act regulations and national defense.

The board consisted of five members and was empowered to

1. form one or more corporations for the purchase, leasing, and operation of merchant vessels with a maximum capital of $50 million,
2. to acquire vessels suitable for naval auxiliaries,
3. to regulate commerce on the Great Lakes and the high seas, including the fixing of rates,
4. to cancel or modify any agreement among carriers that were found to be unfair as between carriers and exporters, or which operated to the detriment of United States commerce, and
5. to sanction pooling agreements among shippers which were exempted from the operations of the Sherman Act.

== Passage and amendment ==
The dispersing of the $50 million was to be overseen by the Emergency Fleet Corporation (EFC). Senate Democrats managed to get the bill amended prior to its passage to forbid the US from purchasing ships from belligerent powers, "tremendously emasculating" the act according to US Treasury Secretary William Gibbs McAdoo. Despite such criticism by hardliners, the Act signified the birth of the modern US merchant marine.

== US Shipping Board ==
During the war, the Shipping Board was headed by Edward N. Hurley, and the EFC passed to the direction of the Bethlehem Steel magnate Charles Schwab. The bill also stipulated that the shipping lines that were owned and operated by the Shipping Board should go out of business five years after the end of the European war and that all the Board's property, except vessels designed primarily as naval auxiliaries, should then be sold. Many of the ships commissioned during the war were never completed, and many of the ships that were fully completed were destroyed or auctioned off in the early 1920s.

As of June 18, 1984, the duties of the US Shipping Board were reduced, and they now apply only to domestic offshore ocean transport.
