= Louis Enricht =

Louis Enricht (c. 1844–1923) was a US inventor who claimed that he had invented a substitute for gasoline.

== Claimed gasoline substitute ==
In 1916, during World War I, Enricht announced that he had invented a cheap substance that, added to ordinary tap water, would be a substitute for gasoline.

Henry Ford visited Enrich at Farmington along with Fords' New York manager in 1918.

In a press conference in Farmingdale, Long Island, he first asked the reporters to check that there was no supplementary tank in the car he had brought. Then he asked one of the reporters to fetch him a bucket of water. He poured greenish liquid into water and filled a gas tank of the car with it. When the car started, it also emitted a strong smell of almonds. Enricht invited the witnesses to use it in their own vehicles.

Enricht admitted that the smell of almonds came from cyanide, but until his lawyer could patent the formula, he kept silent about it. He received millions of dollars - including $100,000 from Hiram Maxim who said he would pay the rest when Enricht would reveal his formula.

Maxim reputedly later dropped the offer, but a banker named Yoakum offered Enricht the same amount. Yoakum received a sealed envelope that supposedly contained the formula. When he heard a - probably unfounded - rumor that Enricht was suspected of being a German spy, he opened the envelope - breaking his part of the agreement - and found only a couple of liberty bonds. He failed to get Enricht tried for treason.

Miller Reese Hutchison observed a demonstration given by Enricht and concluded that an acetylene solution had been used. His own tests with such a solution showed corrosion and other damage to the engine from using an acetylene solution.

Hudson Maxim said the Hudson Munitions Company only had an option on the supposed fuel and wouldn't buy all rights unless tests confirmed claims. Hudson Maxim personally expressed doubts about Enrichts' claims.

== Claim to distill gasoline from peat ==
In 1920, Enricht announced that he had a way to distill gasoline from peat. Again he received a number of would-be-investors. However, district attorney of the Nassau County had decided to investigate. He examined Enricht's bank account and found out that he had spent the money for gambling, instead of benefiting other investors. A demonstration of a machine to produce naphtha from peat in court failed. Louis Enricht blamed the failure on the machine having been dismantled and reassembled, however, the judge refused to allow further demonstrations in court. Enricht was tried for grand larceny and sentenced for seven years.

== Death ==
Enricht was paroled a couple of years later for health reasons and died a year later at the age of 79.

Enricht never revealed the secret formula to anyone nor what the "greenish liquid" was he used in every demonstration to anyone. However, it is a fact that a mixture of acetone, liquid acetylene, and water will run a gasoline car motor and the exhaust gas smells like cyanide. However, it will also prematurely corrode the engine and is much more expensive than gasoline.
