= John A. Winston =

American politician (1812–1871)

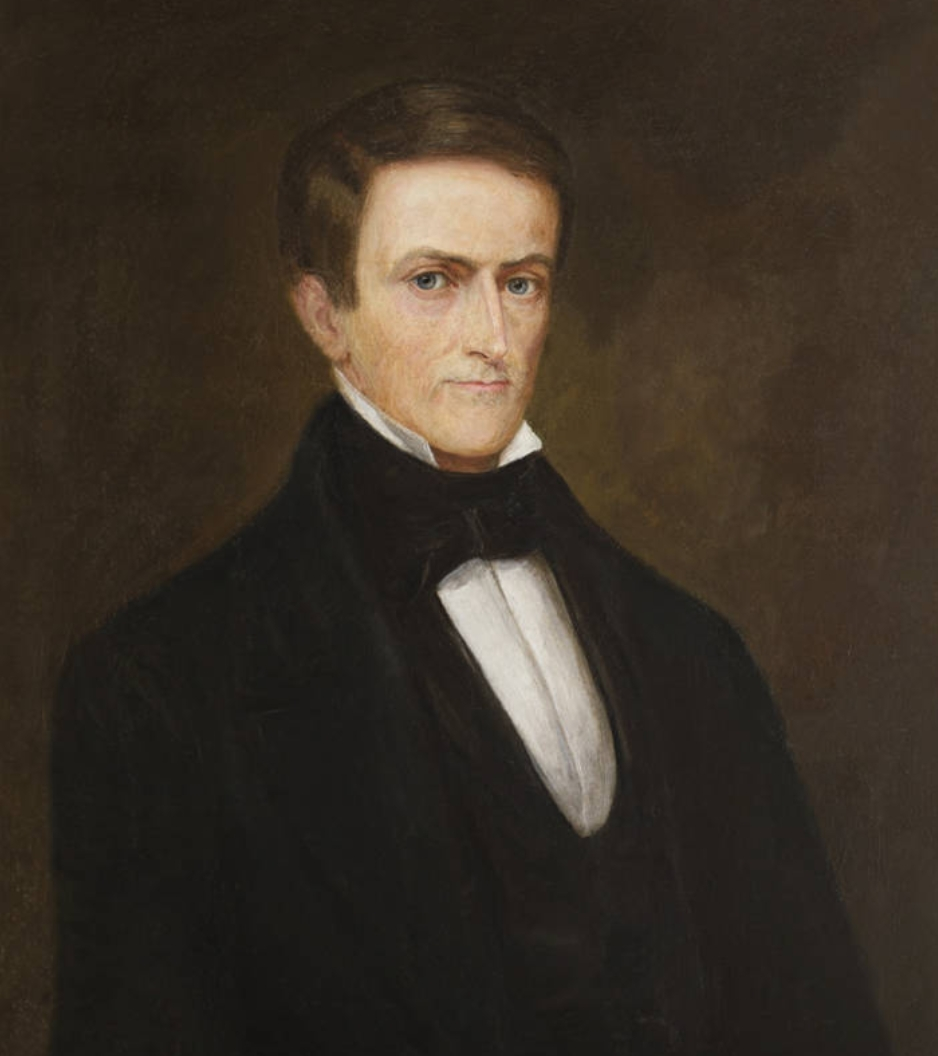

15th Governor of Alabama
- In office December 20, 1853 – December 1, 1857
- Preceded by: Henry W. Collier
- Succeeded by: Andrew B. Moore

Personal details
- Born: John Anthony Winston; September 4, 1812 Madison County, Alabama Territory
- Died: December 21, 1871 (aged 59) Mobile, Alabama, U.S.
- Resting place: Winston Family Cemetery, Gainesville, Alabama
- Party: Democratic

Military service
- Allegiance: Confederate States of America
- Branch/service: Confederate States Army
- Years of service: 1861–65
- Rank: Colonel
- Commands: 8th Alabama Infantry
- Battles/wars: American Civil War: Battle of Seven Pines

John Anthony Winston (September 4, 1812 – December 21, 1871) was a planter, military officer, and politician who served from 1853 to 1857 as the 15th governor of Alabama and from 1845 to 1849 as president of the Alabama state senate. Alabama's first native-born governor, Winston later fought for the Confederate States of America as colonel of the 8th Alabama Infantry early in the American Civil War. After the war, he was not permitted to assume a seat in the United States Senate.

== Early and family life ==
John Anthony Winston was born in 1812 to Mary Cooper and her planter husband William Winston in Madison County, then in the Alabama Territory. His grandfather Anthony Winston was a Revolutionary War veteran who also served in the Virginia House of Delegates.

Winston received a private education typical of his class, including at LaGrange College (now the location of the University of North Alabama) and at Cumberland College (which later became the University of Nashville). He married his first cousin, Mary Agness Jones, on August 7, 1832, in Madison County, Alabama. They had one surviving child, Mary Agnes Winston.

== Career ==
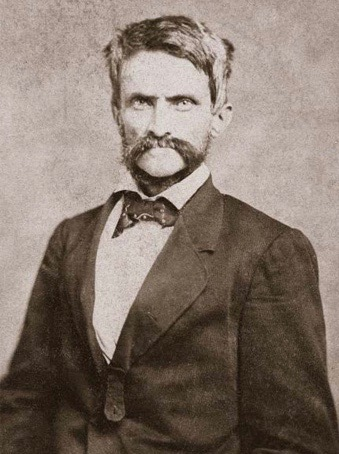

Like his father, Winston ran plantations using enslaved labor. He also became Cotton Commissioner, inspecting Alabama's main export crop.

=== Legislator and officer ===
Winston continued his family's tradition of political involvement in 1840, winning election to the state House of Representatives and reelection in 1842. He was elected to the state Senate in 1843 and reelected until he was elected governor. His fellow senators elected Winston their president from 1845 to 1849. During his legislative career, Winston represented Alabama at the 1848 Democratic party convention in Baltimore and the attempted secessionist convention in Nashville in 1850. Although considered a strong slavery advocate, Winston did not support William Lowndes Yancey's ardent state's rights platform in Baltimore or the popular sovereignty compromise at the Nashville meeting.

In 1846, Winston organized a militia company to fight in the Mexican–American War, but it was never called into active duty.

=== Governor ===
In 1853, Alabama voters elected Winston their 15th governor. Winston became known as the "veto governor" because he vetoed more than 30 bills, many concerning public support for transportation initiatives, including railroads. Alabama's bank had failed, causing his concern about state finances. But Winston still encouraged public education and in 1854 signed a bill creating Alabama's public school system. He was narrowly reelected in 1855 over Know Nothing nominee George D. Shortridge.

=== Confederate officer ===
After Alabama seceded, Winston was colonel of the 8th Alabama Infantry Regiment. His strict discipline did not endear him to his troops. His unit was involved in the Peninsula campaign, most notably the Battle of Seven Pines.

Winston's cousin was the Mississippi's wartime governor, John Jones Pettus, who was born in Wilson County, Tennessee, on October 9, 1813, and died in Pulaski County, Arkansas on January 25, 1867. Pettus's wife, Permelia Virginia Winston, was Winston's sister.

=== Postwar ===
Winston was elected as a delegate to the 1865 Alabama Constitutional Convention. In January 1867, he presented his credentials to the U.S. Senate as senator-elect from Alabama for 1867–1873. He was not permitted to take his seat because he refused to take an oath of allegiance to the United States.

== Death and legacy ==
Winston died on December 21, 1871, in Mobile, Alabama, and is buried in the Winston Family Cemetery near Gainesville in Sumter County, Alabama, as is Permelia Virginia Winston Pettus.

Party political offices
| Preceded by Henry W. Collier | Democratic nominee for Governor of Alabama; 1853, 1855 | Succeeded by Andrew B. Moore |
Political offices
| Preceded by Henry W. Collier | Governor of Alabama; 1853–1857 | Succeeded by Andrew B. Moore |
