= Zoe Yin =

American painter

Zoe L Yin
- Born: 2001 (age 24–25); Boston, Massachusetts
- Occupations: Contemporary painter and novelist

Zoe L Yin (simplified Chinese 尹亮景; born 2001) is an American contemporary painter and sculptor. Boston WCVB TV, Cleveland WCPN Radio, CTITV Taiwan, CTI Asian, THNKR-TV, China Central TV, China Education TV, China Daily call her a child prodigy.

== Background ==
Yin was born in Boston, Massachusetts. Her father, Dr. Yizhong Yin, is a biomedical scientist. Her older sibling, Victoria L Yin, is a child prodigy painter and poet. Yin graduated cum laude from Phillips Academy Andover and is currently attending Columbia University.

== Career ==
Yin began drawing when she was one year old. At age six, she became a member of the Andover Artists Guild and exhibited at the 33rd annual Andover Art in the Park, where she sold her first acrylic painting. She exhibited at the Art Expo New York at age eight. Her work has been presented by galleries in America and China, and become internationally known.

In 2010, when she was nine, Beck Center for the Arts, Ohio, exhibited Yin's works. The World Art Museum in Beijing, China exhibited her work in 2011 when she was ten. Yin's art book with her sibling “Art World Child Prodigy Siblings--Victoria Yin, Zoe Yin” was published in English and Chinese.

Yin painted live on CCTV worldwide broadcasting program cross over. She was featured in the Daily Beast, China Daily, China News, Boston WCVB-TV Chronicle, BTV Beijing, CTI Asian, CCTV (China Central TV) cultural express, China Education TV, and CTITV Taiwan.

Yin's story was documented in two episodes of PRODIGIES, "Young Prodigies Dazzle The Art World" and "Art Prodigy Compared to Matisse" when she was 11. PRODIGIES is a bi-weekly series from THNKRtv, initiated by Google, showing the youngest and brightest talents.

In 2018, Yin launched www.museumofstudentarts.org, a web platform for students around the globe to share their creative works.
