= California Institute of Technology =

Private university in Pasadena, California

- Former name: List: Throop University (1891–1907); Throop Polytechnic Institute and Manual Training School (1907–1913); Throop College of Technology (1913–1920)
- Motto: "The truth shall make you free"
- Type: Private research university
- Established: September 23, 1891; 135 years ago
- Founder: Amos G. Throop
- Accreditation: WSCUC
- Academic affiliations: AAU; AITU; APRU; COFHE; URA; Space-grant
- Endowment: $4.32 billion (2025)
- President: Ray Jayawardhana
- Provost: David A. Tirrell
- Faculty: 300 professorial faculty
- Students: 2,430 (2024–25)
- Undergraduates: 987 (2024–25)
- Postgraduates: 1,443 (2024–25)
- Location: Pasadena, California, United States; 34°08′15″N 118°07′30″W
- Campus: Midsize city 124 acres (0.50 km^{2})
- Newspaper: The California Tech
- Colors: Orange and white
- Nickname: Beavers
- Sporting affiliations: NCAA Division III – SCIAC
- Mascot: Bernoulli the Beaver
- Website: caltech.edu

The California Institute of Technology (branded as Caltech) (Note: The university itself only spells its short form as "Caltech"; the institution considers other spellings such as "Cal Tech" and "CalTech" incorrect. The institute is also occasionally referred to as "CIT", most notably in its alma mater, but this is uncommon.) is a private research university in Pasadena, California, United States. The university is responsible for many modern scientific advancements and is among a small group of institutes of technology in the United States that are devoted to the instruction of pure and applied sciences.

The institution was founded as a preparatory and vocational school by Amos G. Throop in 1891 and began attracting influential scientists such as George Ellery Hale, Arthur Amos Noyes, and Robert Andrews Millikan in the early 20th century. The vocational and preparatory schools were disbanded and spun off in 1910, and the college assumed its present name in 1920. In 1934, Caltech was elected to the Association of American Universities, and the antecedents of NASA's Jet Propulsion Laboratory, which Caltech continues to manage and operate, were established between 1936 and 1943 under Theodore von Kármán.

Caltech has six academic divisions with strong emphasis on science and engineering, managing $332 million in research grants as of 2010. Its 124-acre (50 ha) primary campus is located approximately 11 mi (18 km) northeast of downtown Los Angeles, in Pasadena. First-year students are required to live on campus, and 95% of undergraduates remain in the on-campus housing system at Caltech. Students agree to abide by an honor code which allows faculty to assign take-home examinations. The Caltech Beavers compete in 13 intercollegiate sports in the NCAA Division III's Southern California Intercollegiate Athletic Conference (SCIAC).

Scientists and engineers at or from the university have played an essential role in many modern scientific breakthroughs and innovations, including advances in space research, sustainability science, quantum physics, and seismology. As of October 2024, there are 80 Nobel laureates who have been affiliated with Caltech, making it the institution with the highest number of Nobelists per capita in America. This includes 48 alumni and faculty members (49 prizes, with chemist Linus Pauling being the only individual in history to win two unshared prizes). In addition, 68 National Medal of Science Recipients, 43 MacArthur Fellows, 15 National Medal of Technology and Innovation recipients, 11 astronauts, 5 science advisors to the president, 4 Fields Medalists, and 6 Turing Award winners have been affiliated with Caltech.

== History ==
=== Throop College ===
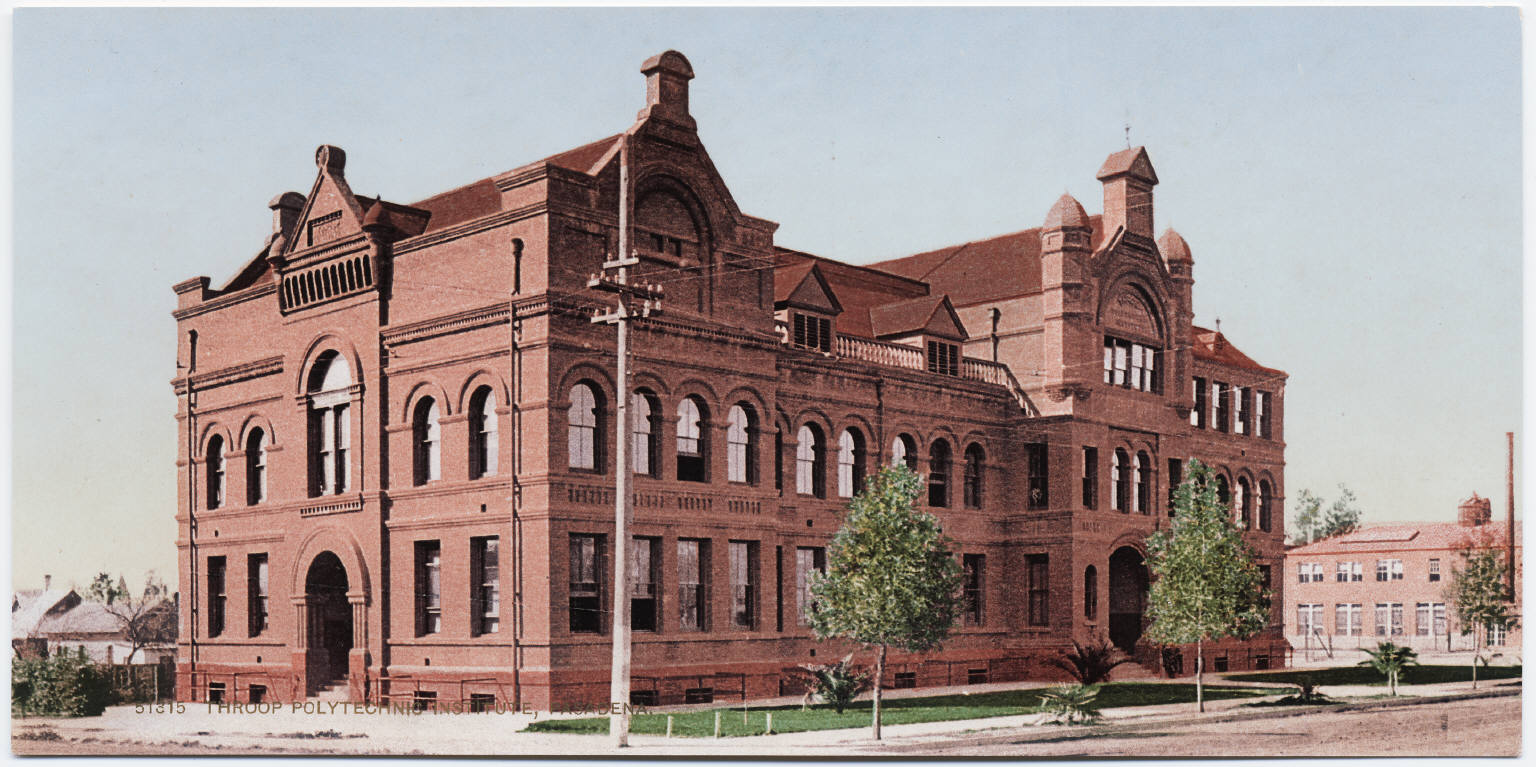
Throop Polytechnic Institute on its original campus at downtown Pasadena, c. 1897–1900s

Caltech started as a vocational school founded in present-day Old Pasadena on Fair Oaks Avenue and Chestnut Street on September 23, 1891, by local businessman and politician Amos G. Throop. The school was known successively as Throop University, Throop Polytechnic Institute (and Manual Training School) and Throop College of Technology before acquiring its current name in 1920. The vocational school was disbanded and the preparatory program was split off to form the independent Polytechnic School in 1907.

At a time when scientific research in the United States was still in its infancy, George Ellery Hale, a solar astronomer from the University of Chicago, founded the Mount Wilson Observatory in 1904. He joined Throop's board of trustees in 1907, and soon began developing the university, and the whole of Pasadena, into a major scientific and cultural destination. He engineered the appointment of James A. B. Scherer, a literary scholar untutored in science but very capable in administration and fund-raising, to Throop's presidency in 1908. Scherer persuaded retired businessman and trustee Charles W. Gates to donate $25,000 in seed money (equivalent to $900,000 in 2025) to build Gates Laboratory, the first science building on campus.

=== World Wars ===
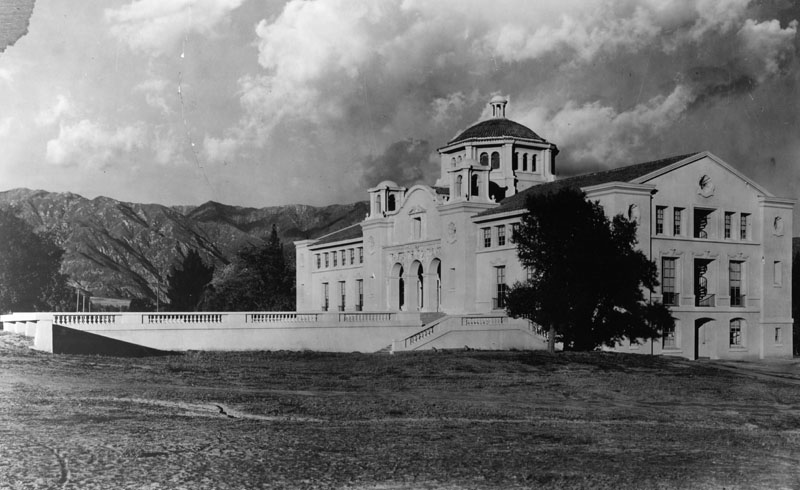
Throop Hall, 1912

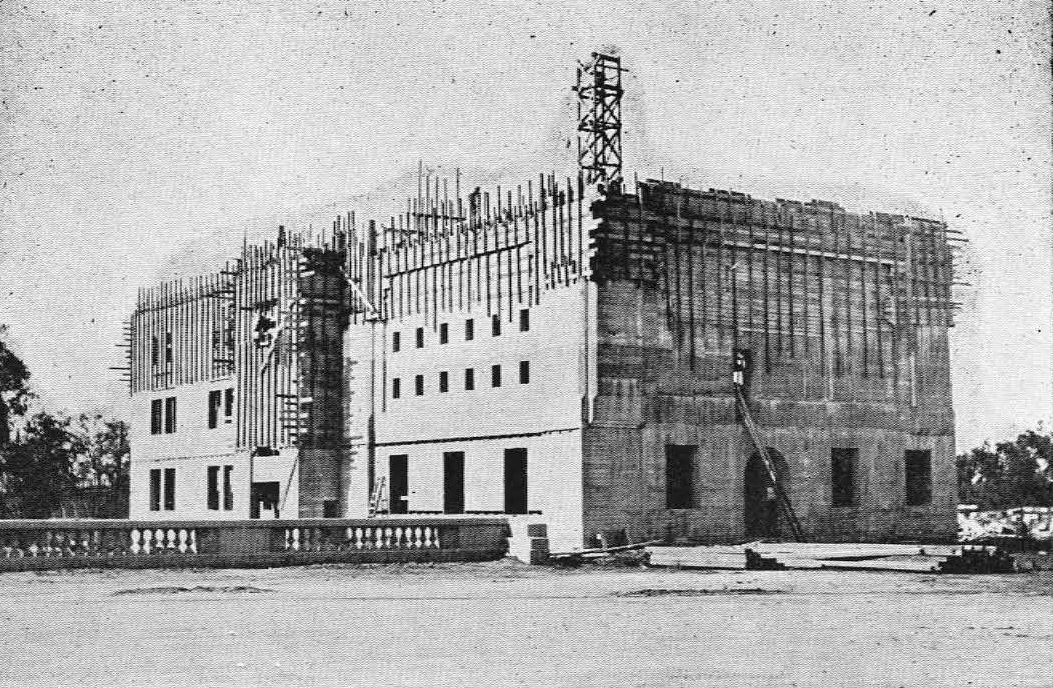
Construction of Norman Bridge Laboratory of Physics in 1921

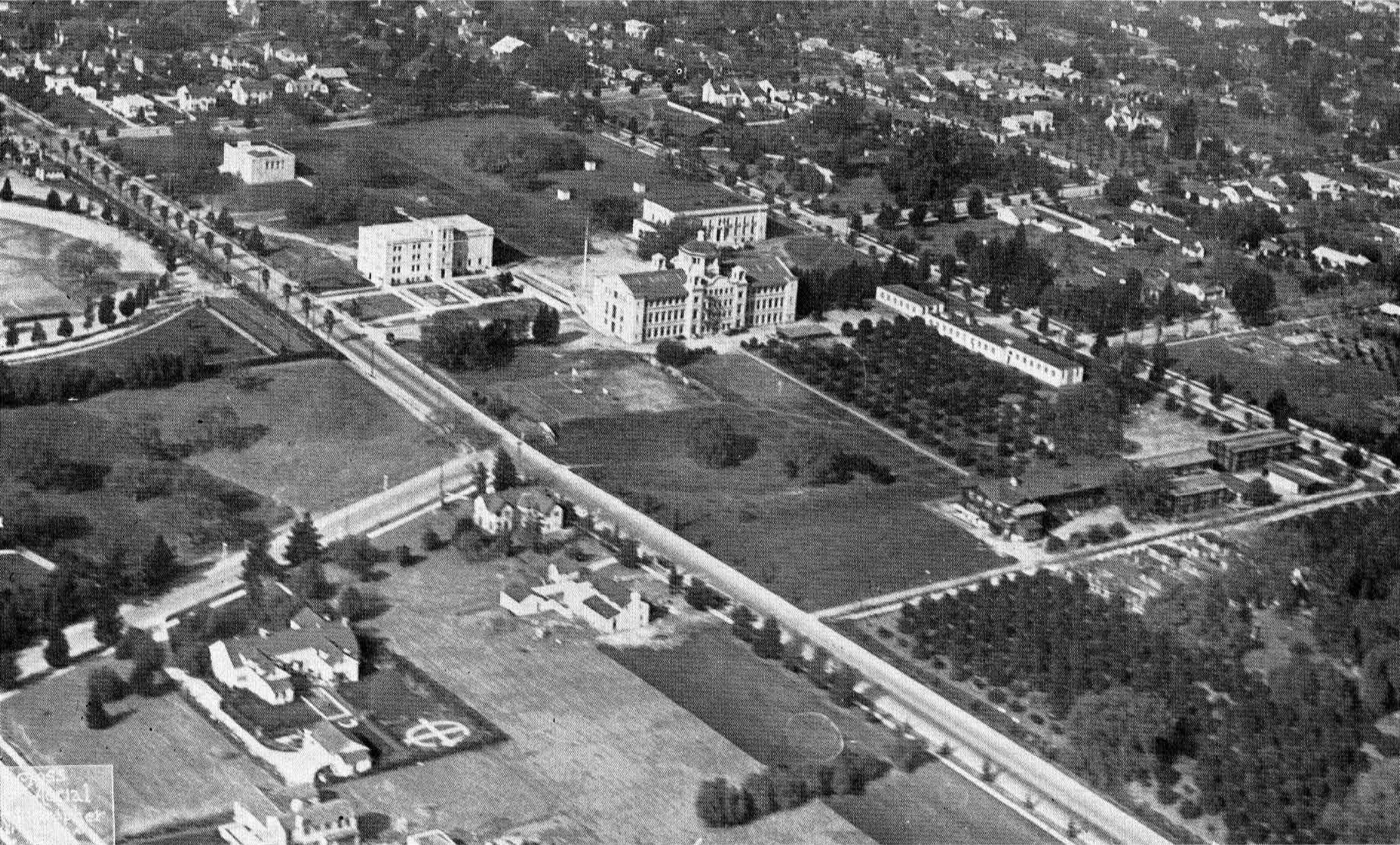
Aerial view of Caltech in 1922

In 1910, Throop moved to its current site. Arthur Fleming donated the land for the permanent campus site. Theodore Roosevelt delivered an address at Throop Institute on March 21, 1911, and he declared:

I want to see institutions like Throop turn out perhaps ninety-nine of every hundred students as men who are to do given pieces of industrial work better than any one else can do them; I want to see those men do the kind of work that is now being done on the Panama Canal and on the great irrigation projects in the interior of this country—and the one-hundredth man I want to see with the kind of cultural scientific training that will make him and his fellows the matrix out of which you can occasionally develop a man like your great astronomer, George Ellery Hale.

Also in 1911, a bill was introduced in the California Legislature calling for the establishment of a publicly funded "California Institute of Technology", with an initial budget of a million dollars, ten times the budget of Throop at the time. The board of trustees offered to turn Throop over to the state, but the presidents of Stanford University and the University of California, Berkeley successfully lobbied to defeat the bill, which allowed Throop to develop as the only scientific research-oriented educational institute in southern California, public or private, until the onset of World War II necessitated the broader development of research-based science education. The promise of Throop attracted physical chemist Arthur Amos Noyes from MIT to develop the institution and assist in establishing it as a center for science and technology.

With the onset of World War I, Hale organized the National Research Council to coordinate and support scientific work on military problems. While he supported the idea of federal appropriations for science, he took exception to a federal bill that would have funded engineering research at land-grant colleges, and instead sought to raise a $1 million national research fund entirely from private sources. To that end, as Hale wrote in The New York Times:

Throop College of Technology, in Pasadena California has recently afforded a striking illustration of one way in which the Research Council can secure co-operation and advance scientific investigation. This institution, with its able investigators and excellent research laboratories, could be of great service in any broad scheme of cooperation. President Scherer, hearing of the formation of the council, immediately offered to take part in its work, and with this object, he secured within three days an additional research endowment of one hundred thousand dollars.

Through the National Research Council, Hale simultaneously lobbied for science to play a larger role in national affairs, and for Throop to play a national role in science. The new funds were designated for physics research, and ultimately led to the establishment of the Norman Bridge Laboratory, which attracted experimental physicist Robert Andrews Millikan from the University of Chicago in 1917. During the course of the war, Hale, Noyes and Millikan worked together in Washington on the NRC. Subsequently, they continued their partnership in developing Caltech. A 22-acre campus plan was proposed in 1917.

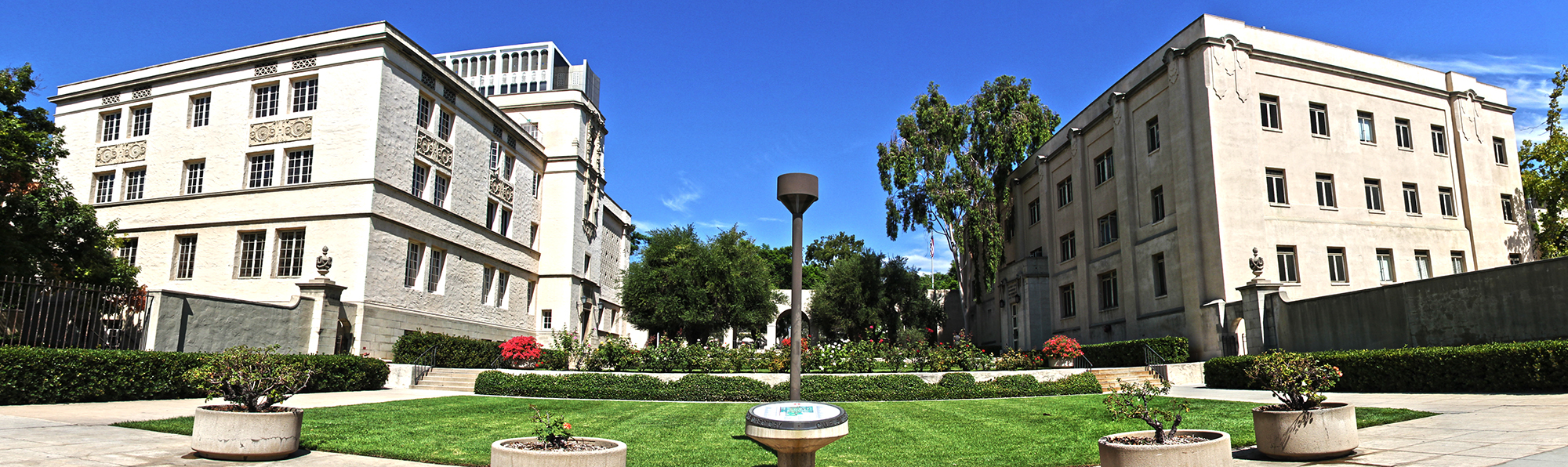
Caltech entrance at 1200 E California Blvd. On the left is East Norman Bridge Laboratory of Physics and on the right is the Linde Hall of Mathematics and Physics.

Under the leadership of Hale, Noyes, and Millikan (aided by the booming economy of Southern California), Caltech grew to national prominence in the 1920s and concentrated on the development of Roosevelt's "Hundredth Man". On November 29, 1921, the trustees declared it to be the express policy of the institute to pursue scientific research of the greatest importance and at the same time "to continue to conduct thorough courses in engineering and pure science, basing the work of these courses on exceptionally strong instruction in the fundamental sciences of mathematics, physics, and chemistry; broadening and enriching the curriculum by a liberal amount of instruction in such subjects as English, history, and economics; and vitalizing all the work of the Institute by the infusion in generous measure of the spirit of research". In 1923, Millikan was awarded the Nobel Prize in Physics. In 1925, the school established a department of geology and hired William Bennett Munro, then chairman of the division of History, Government, and Economics at Harvard University, to create a division of humanities and social sciences at Caltech. In 1928, a division of biology was established under the leadership of Thomas Hunt Morgan, the most distinguished biologist in the United States at the time, and discoverer of the role of genes and the chromosome in heredity. In 1930, Kerckhoff Marine Laboratory was established in Corona del Mar under the care of Professor George MacGinitie. In 1926, a graduate school of aeronautics was created, which eventually attracted Theodore von Kármán. Kármán later helped create the Jet Propulsion Laboratory, and played an integral part in establishing Caltech as one of the world's centers for rocket science. In 1928, construction of the Palomar Observatory began.

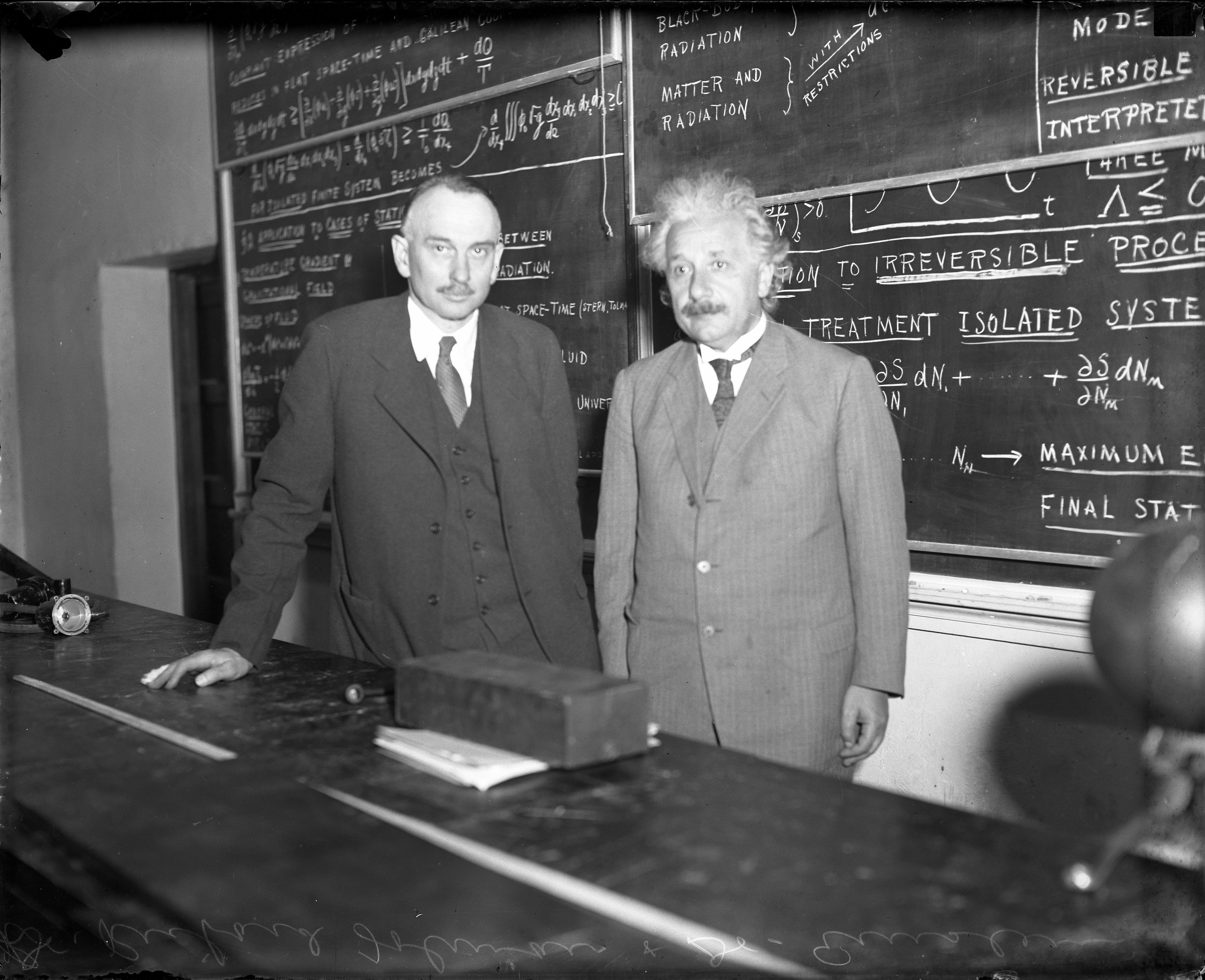
Richard C. Tolman and Albert Einstein at Caltech, 1932

Millikan served as "Chairman of the Executive Council" (effectively Caltech's president) from 1921 to 1945, and his influence was such that the institute was occasionally referred to as "Millikan's School". Millikan initiated a visiting-scholars program soon after joining Caltech. Notable scientists who accepted his invitation include Paul Dirac, Erwin Schrödinger, Werner Heisenberg, Hendrik Lorentz and Niels Bohr. Albert Einstein arrived on the Caltech campus for the first time in 1931 to polish up his Theory of General Relativity, and he returned to Caltech subsequently as a visiting professor in 1932 and 1933.

During World War II, Caltech was one of 131 colleges and universities nationally that took part in the V-12 Navy College Training Program which offered students a path to a Navy commission. The United States Navy also maintained a naval training school for aeronautical engineering, resident inspectors of ordinance and naval material, and a liaison officer to the National Defense Research Committee on campus. During the war, some scientists from Caltech, including J. Robert Oppenheimer, Richard Tolman, and Robert Bacher, were instrumental in the Manhattan Project and contributed to critical aspects of the atomic bomb's development.

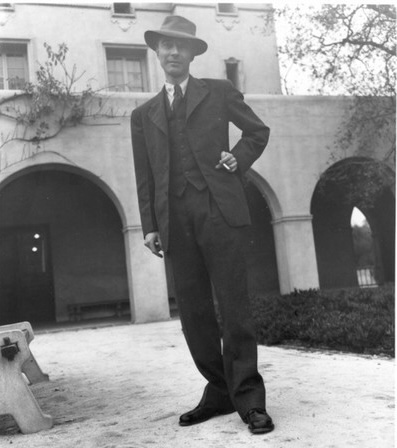
J. Robert Oppenheimer at Caltech in 1930

Caltech was also directly involved in other bomb-related research with a group led by Charles Lauritsen which assisted in the development of the high-explosive lenses used in the Fat Man implosion bomb, crucial to the Trinity Test and the subsequent bombing of Nagasaki. Lauritsen's team at Caltech developed detonators that would later be used in atomic bombs. In November 1943, Caltech and the U.S. Navy established the Naval Ordnance Test Station (NOTS) in Inyokern, California, near the Mojave Desert to work on aircraft ordnance and rocket development. One of the most successful innovations was the development of the 5-inch High-Velocity Aircraft Rocket, commonly known as the "Holy Moses", which was used in combat against enemy fortifications and ships.

The partnership between the Navy and Caltech continued to deepen throughout the war, leading to the creation of several military technologies, and by 1945, the focus of Caltech's war contributions expanded further with Project Camel, a collaboration between the Naval Ordnance Test Station and the Manhattan Project. Caltech scientists worked on a variety of assignments, including B-29 airdrop tests of model atomic bombs and the manufacturing of explosives for use in the atomic bomb's implosion mechanism. Additionally, the Salt Wells Pilot Plant at Inyokern was developed with Caltech scientists in response to concerns about the safety of explosive production at Los Alamos and began producing high explosives just days before the Trinity Test in July 1945. Early in the war, Caltech scientists, including Lauritsen's son, Thomas Lauritsen, worked on various rocket designs at the Kellogg Radiation Laboratory. These rockets, including the "Tiny Tim" and the "Mighty Mouse", were used in critical military operations, from naval engagements to land assaults. By the end of the war, Caltech had essentially become an extension of the U.S. Navy's Bureau of Ordnance, with its rocket research providing important technology to U.S. combat capabilities.

=== Project Vista ===
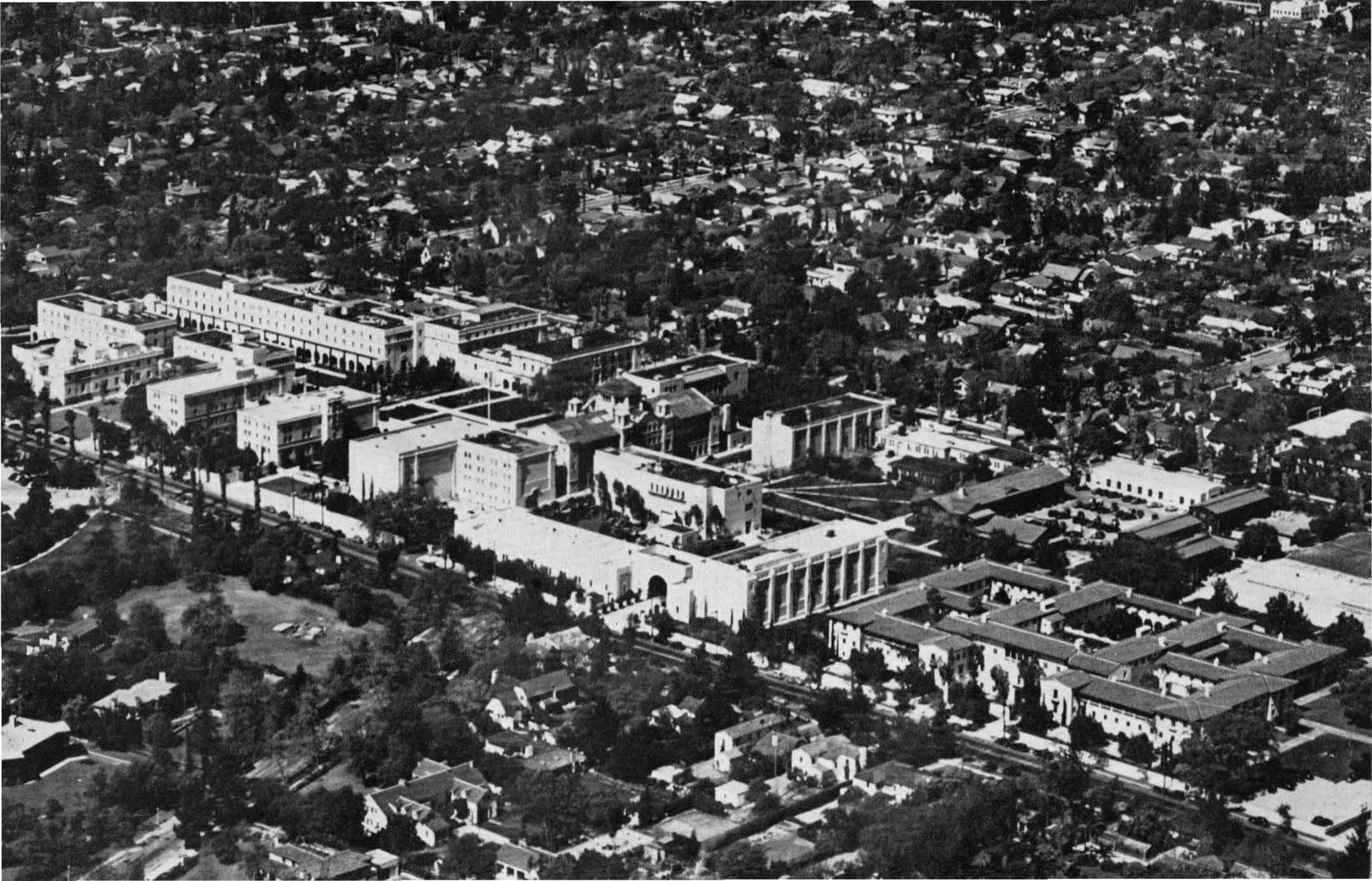
The campus in 1944

From April to December 1951, Caltech was the host of a federal classified study, Project Vista. The selection of Caltech as host for the project was based on the university's expertise in rocketry and nuclear physics. In response to the war in Korea and the pressure from the Soviet Union, the project was Caltech's way of assisting the federal government in its effort to increase national security. The project was created to study new ways of improving the relationship between tactical air support and ground troops. The Army, Air Force, and Navy sponsored the project; however, it was under contract with the Army. The study was named after the hotel, Vista del Arroyo Hotel, which housed the study. The study operated under a committee with the supervision of President Lee A. DuBridge. William A. Fowler, a professor at Caltech, was selected as research director. More than a fourth of Caltech's faculty and a group of outside scientists staffed the project. Moreover, the number increases if one takes into account visiting scientists, military liaisons, secretarial, and security staff. In compensation for its participation, the university received about $750,000.

=== Post-war growth ===
From the 1950s to 1980s, Caltech was the home of Murray Gell-Mann and Richard Feynman, whose work was central to the establishment of the Standard Model of particle physics. Feynman was also known outside the physics community as a teacher and unconventional character.

During Lee A. DuBridge's tenure as Caltech's president (1946–1969), Caltech's faculty doubled and the campus tripled in size. DuBridge, unlike his predecessors, welcomed federal funding of science. New research fields flourished, including chemical biology, planetary science, nuclear astrophysics, and geochemistry. A 200-inch telescope was dedicated on nearby Palomar Mountain in 1948 and remained the world's most powerful optical telescope for over forty years.

Caltech opened its doors to female undergraduates during the presidency of Harold Brown in 1970, and they made up 14% of the entering class. The portion of female undergraduates has been increasing since then.

Protests by Caltech students are rare. The earliest was a 1968 protest outside the NBC Burbank studios, in response to rumors that NBC was to cancel Star Trek. In 1973, the students from Dabney House protested a presidential visit with a sign on the library bearing the simple phrase "Impeach Nixon". The following week, Ross McCollum, president of the National Oil Company, wrote an open letter to Dabney House stating that in light of their actions he had decided not to donate one million dollars to Caltech. The Dabney family, being Republicans, disowned Dabney House after hearing of the protest.

=== 21st century ===
Since 2000, the Einstein Papers Project has been located at Caltech. The project was established in 1986 to assemble, preserve, translate, and publish papers selected from the literary estate of Albert Einstein and from other collections.

In fall 2008, the freshman class was 42% female, a record for Caltech's undergraduate enrollment. In the same year, the Institute concluded a six-year-long fund-raising campaign. The campaign raised more than $1.4 billion from about 16,000 donors. Nearly half of the funds went into the support of Caltech programs and projects.

In 2010, Caltech, in partnership with Lawrence Berkeley National Laboratory and headed by Professor Nathan Lewis, established a DOE Energy Innovation Hub aimed at developing revolutionary methods to generate fuels directly from sunlight. This hub, the Joint Center for Artificial Photosynthesis, will receive up to $122 million in federal funding over five years.

Since 2012, Caltech began to offer classes through massive open online courses (MOOCs) under Coursera, from 2013, edX. Since 2020, Caltech’s Center for Technology and Management Education (CTME) has provided professional certificate programs and bootcamps targeted at working professionals. Beginning in 2022, CTME faced a class-action lawsuit alleging that its cybersecurity bootcamp was misleadingly marketed as a Caltech program, despite being fully designed and taught by the third-party company Simplilearn without Caltech faculty involvement. The lawsuit asserted that students were misled by the use of Caltech branding. In response, Caltech announced it would end its partnership with Simplilearn and restructure CTME programs under internal oversight.

Jean-Lou Chameau, the eighth president, announced on February 19, 2013, that he would be stepping down to accept the presidency at King Abdullah University of Science and Technology. Thomas F. Rosenbaum was announced to be the ninth president of Caltech on October 24, 2013, and his term began on July 1, 2014.

The Laser Interferometer Gravitational‑Wave Observatory (LIGO) was designed and constructed by a team of scientists from the California Institute of Technology, MIT, and industrial partners, funded by the National Science Foundation. It was intended to launch gravitational‑wave astronomy by detecting the ripples in spacetime predicted by Einstein’s general relativity. Gravitational waves were directly detected for the first time on September 14, 2015, by the LIGO detectors. For their pivotal roles in building the LIGO observatory and making the discovery, Caltech physicists Kip Thorne and Barry Barish, together with MIT physicist Rainer Weiss, were awarded the 2017 Nobel Prize in Physics. Thorne, who is a Caltech graduate, provided the theoretical foundation that guided LIGO's design.

In 2019, Caltech received a gift of $750 million for sustainability research from the Resnick family of The Wonderful Company. The gift is the largest ever for environmental sustainability research and the second-largest private donation to a US academic institution (after Bloomberg's gift of $1.8 billion to Johns Hopkins University in 2018).

In January 2021, the Caltech Board of Trustees authorized the removal of the names to six historical figures—including inaugural president Robert Millikan, Harry Chandler, Albert Ruddock—from campus buildings due to their affiliations with the Human Betterment Foundation, an American eugenics organization. As a result, Millikan Library was renamed Caltech Hall, Chandler Dining Hall became Lee F. Browne Dining Hall, Ruddock House was renamed Grant D. Venerable House (after Caltech’s first Black graduate).

== Campus ==
Caltech's 124-acre (50 ha) primary campus is located in Pasadena, California, approximately 11 miles (18 km) northeast of downtown Los Angeles. It is within walking distance of Old Town Pasadena and the Pasadena Playhouse District and therefore the two locations are frequent getaways for Caltech students.

In 1917 Hale hired architect Bertram Goodhue to produce a master plan for the 22 acres (8.9 ha) campus. Goodhue conceived the overall layout of the campus and designed the physics building, Dabney Hall, and several other structures, in which he sought to be consistent with the local climate, the character of the school, and Hale's educational philosophy. Goodhue's designs for Caltech were also influenced by the traditional Spanish mission architecture of Southern California.

During the 1960s, Caltech underwent considerable expansion, in part due to the philanthropy of alumnus and professor Arnold O. Beckman. In 1953, Beckman was asked to join the Caltech Board of Trustees. In 1964, he became its chairman. Over the next few years, as Caltech's president emeritus David Baltimore described it, Arnold Beckman and his wife Mabel "shaped the destiny of Caltech".

In 1971 a magnitude-6.6 earthquake in San Fernando caused some damage to the Caltech campus. Engineers who evaluated the damage found that two historic buildings dating from the early days of the Institute—Throop Hall and the Goodhue-designed Culbertson Auditorium—had cracked.

New additions to the campus include the Cahill Center for Astronomy and Astrophysics and the Walter and Leonore Annenberg Center for Information Science and Technology, which opened in 2009, and the Warren and Katherine Schlinger Laboratory for Chemistry and Chemical Engineering followed in March 2010. The institute also concluded an upgrading of the South Houses in 2006. In late 2010, Caltech completed a 1.3 MW solar array projected to produce approximately 1.6 GWh in 2011.

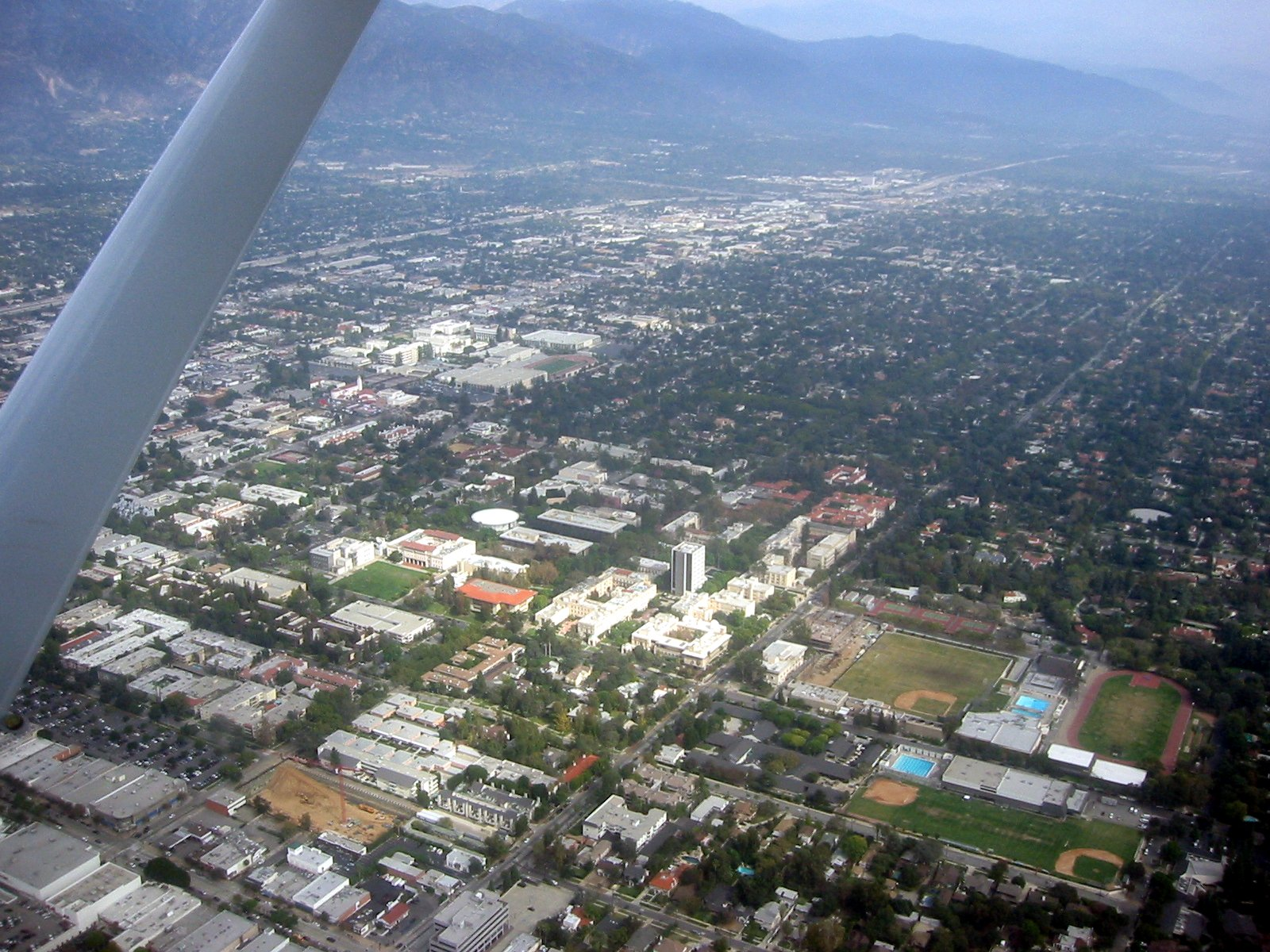
Aerial view of Caltech in Pasadena, California

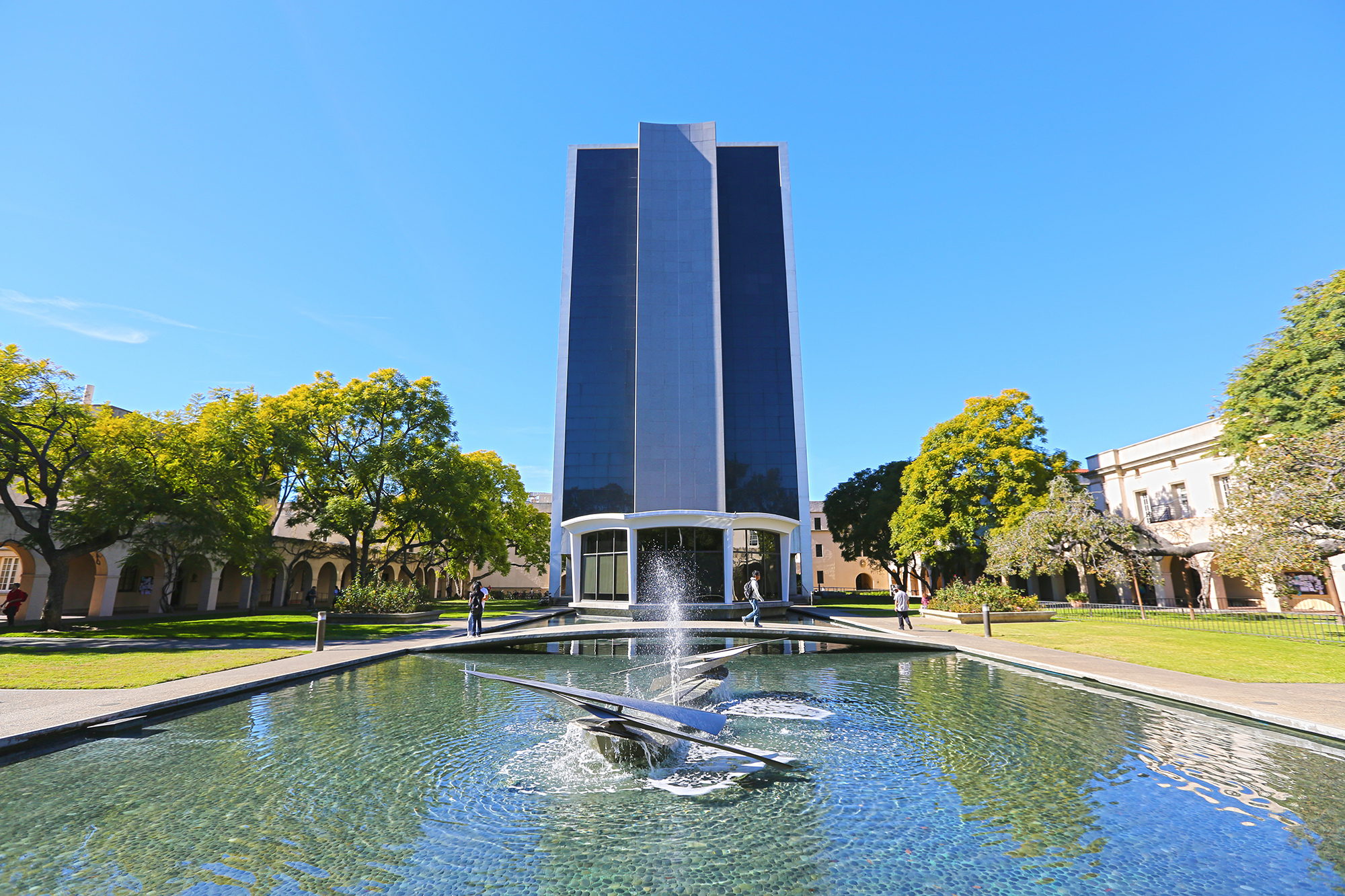
Millikan Library, the tallest building on campus.

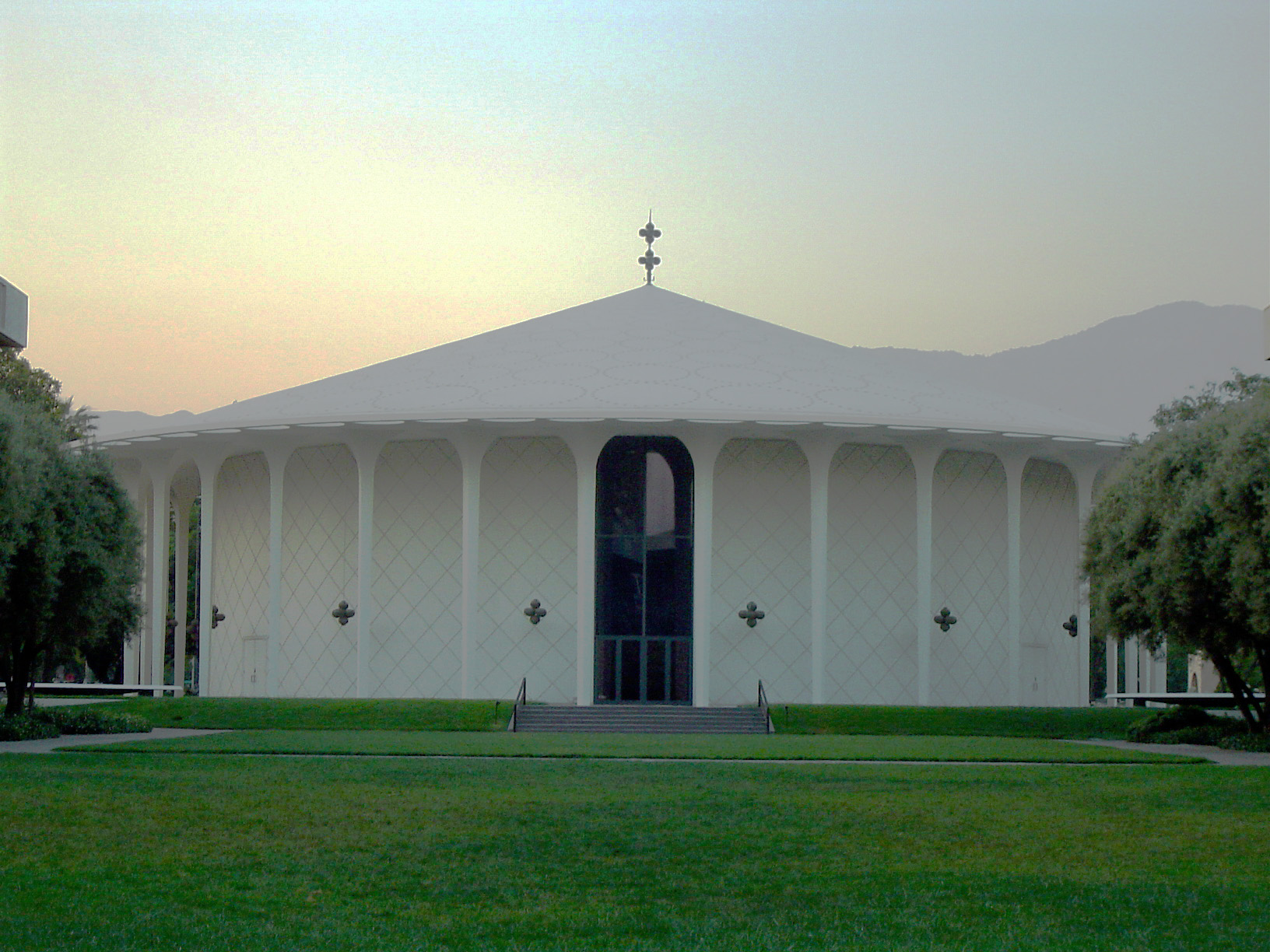
The Beckman Auditorium

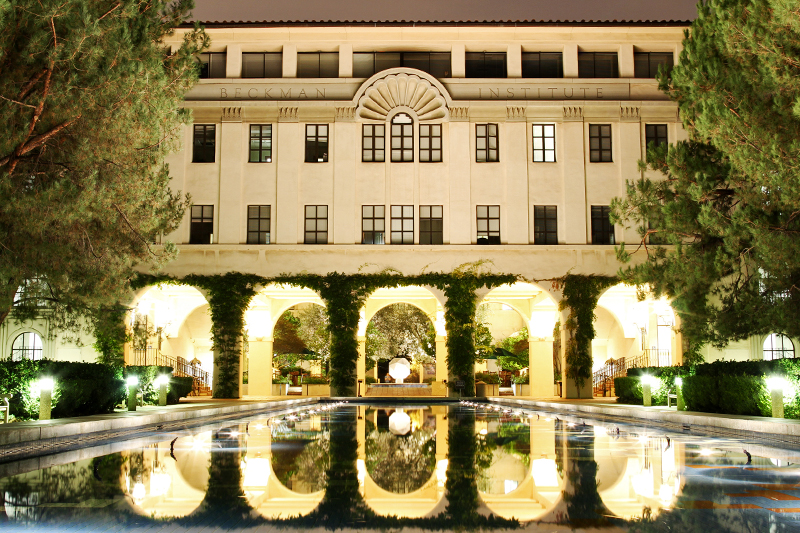
Beckman Institute at Caltech

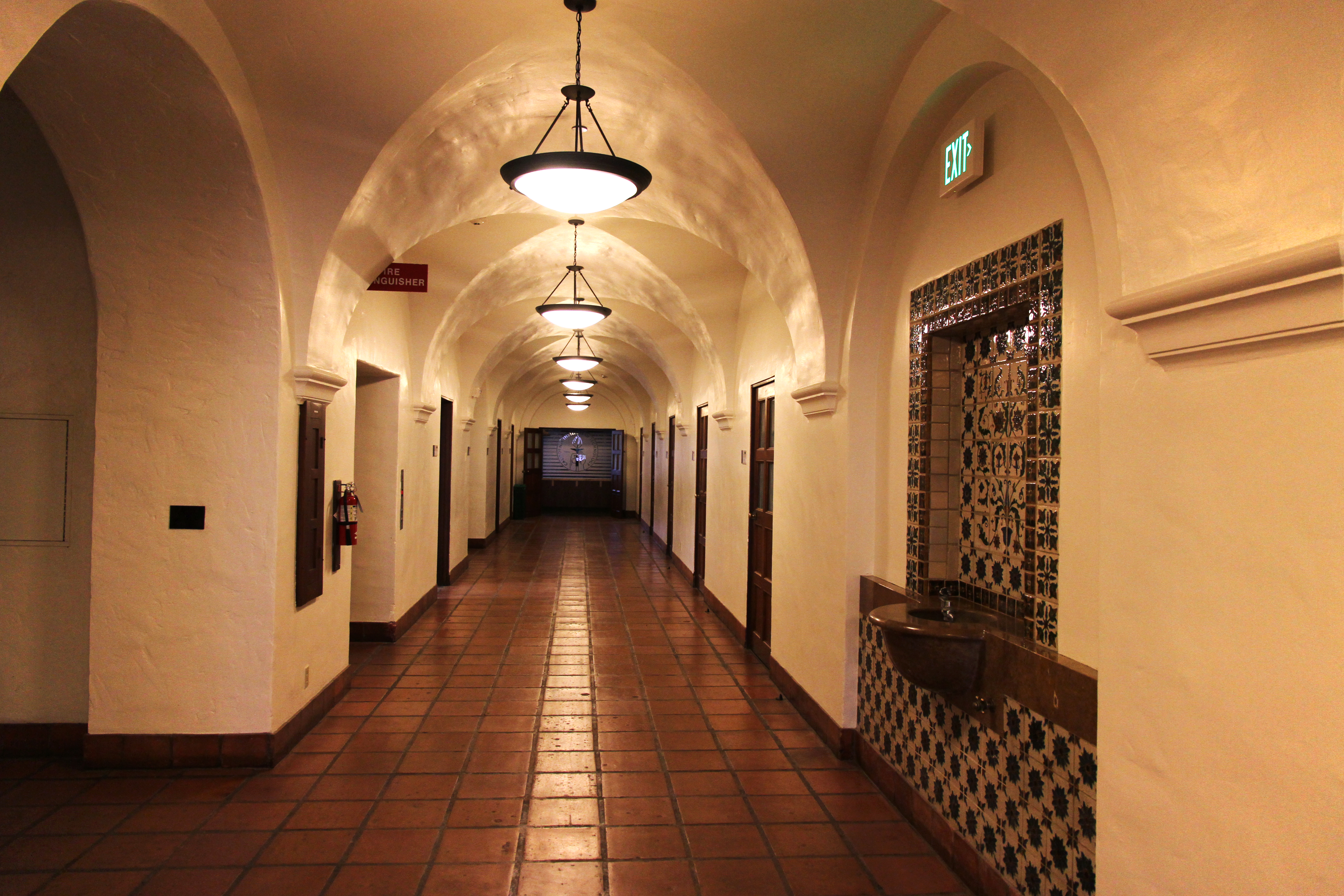
The Bridge Laboratory of Physics

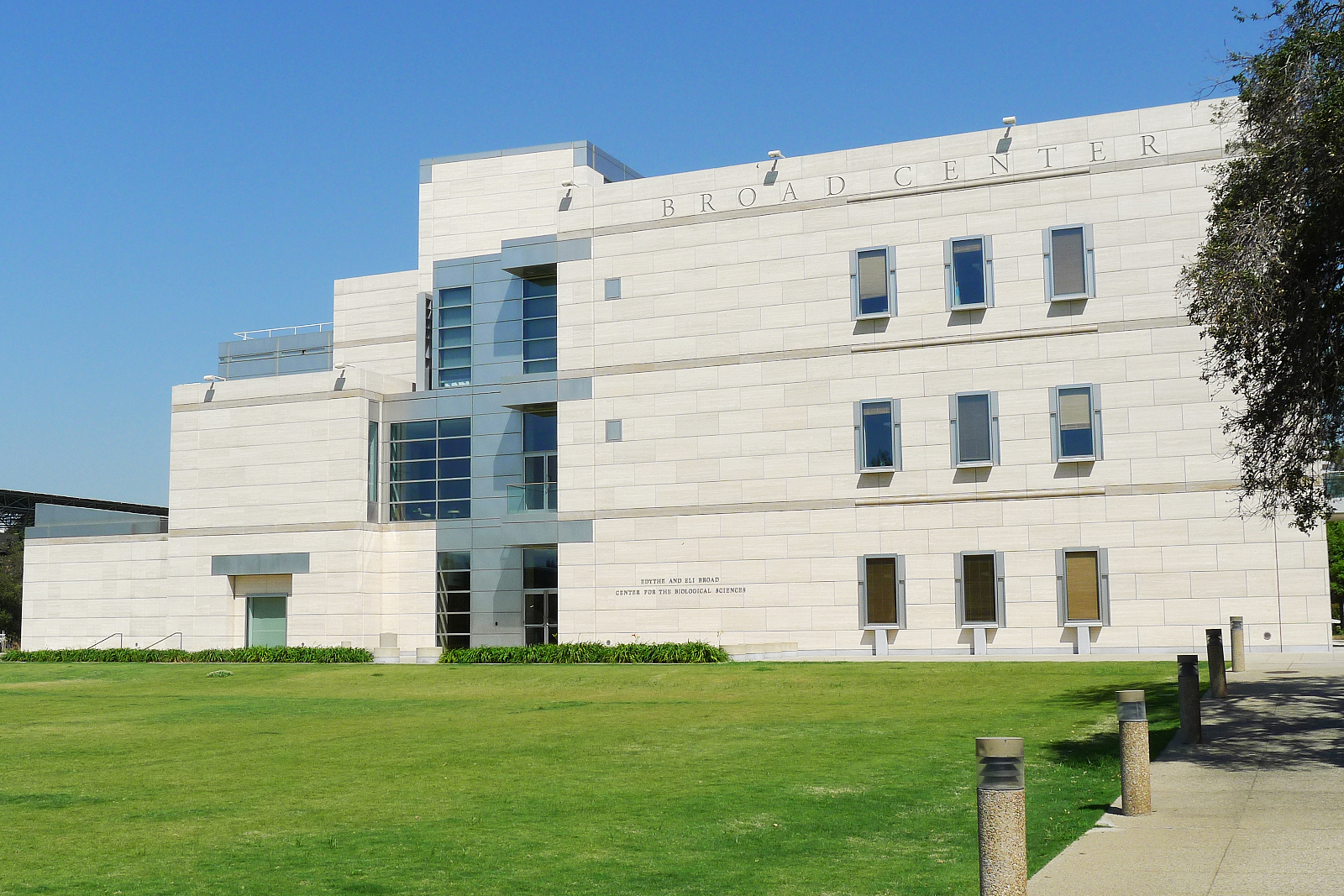
Broad Center for Biological Sciences

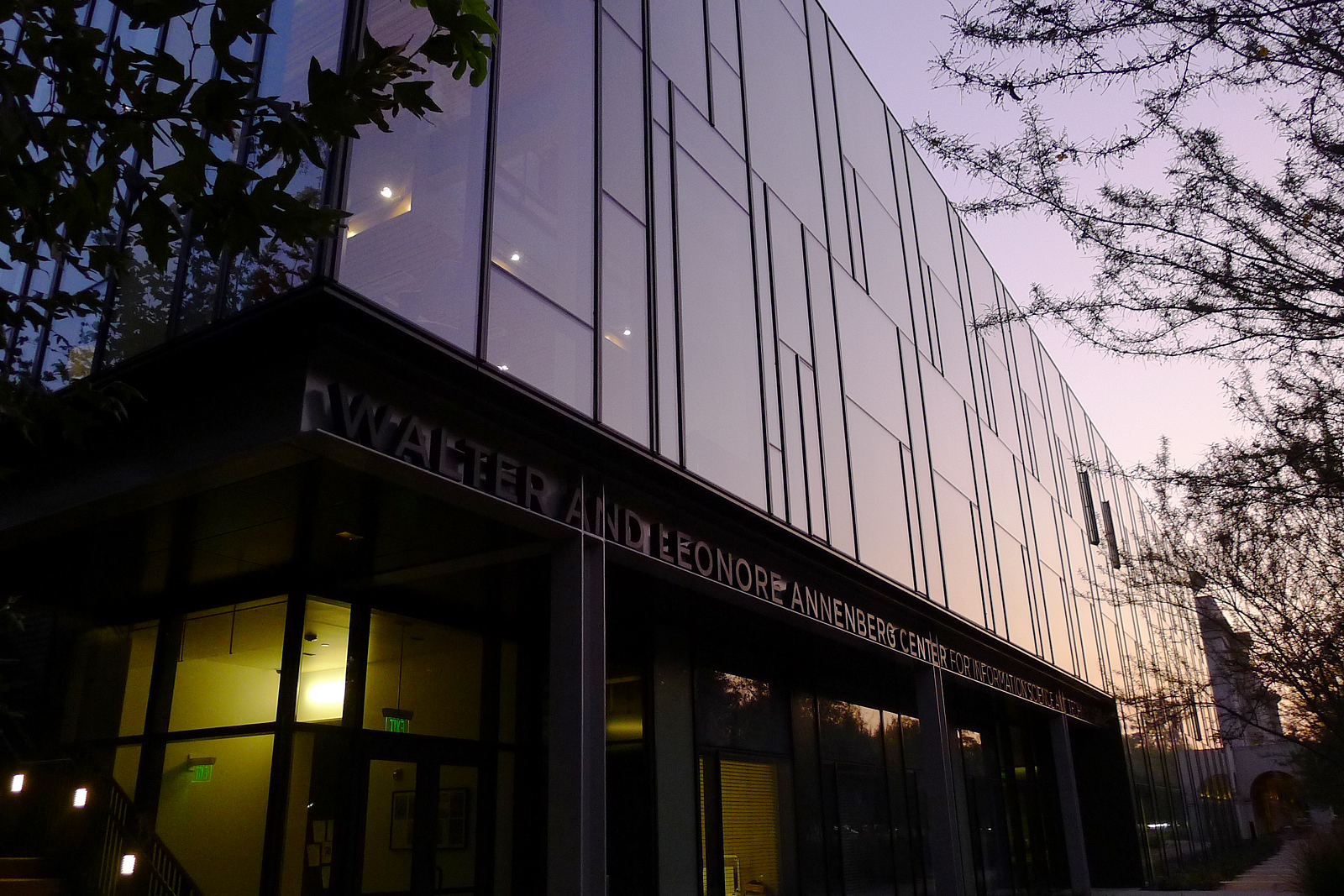
Annenberg Center for Information Science and Technology

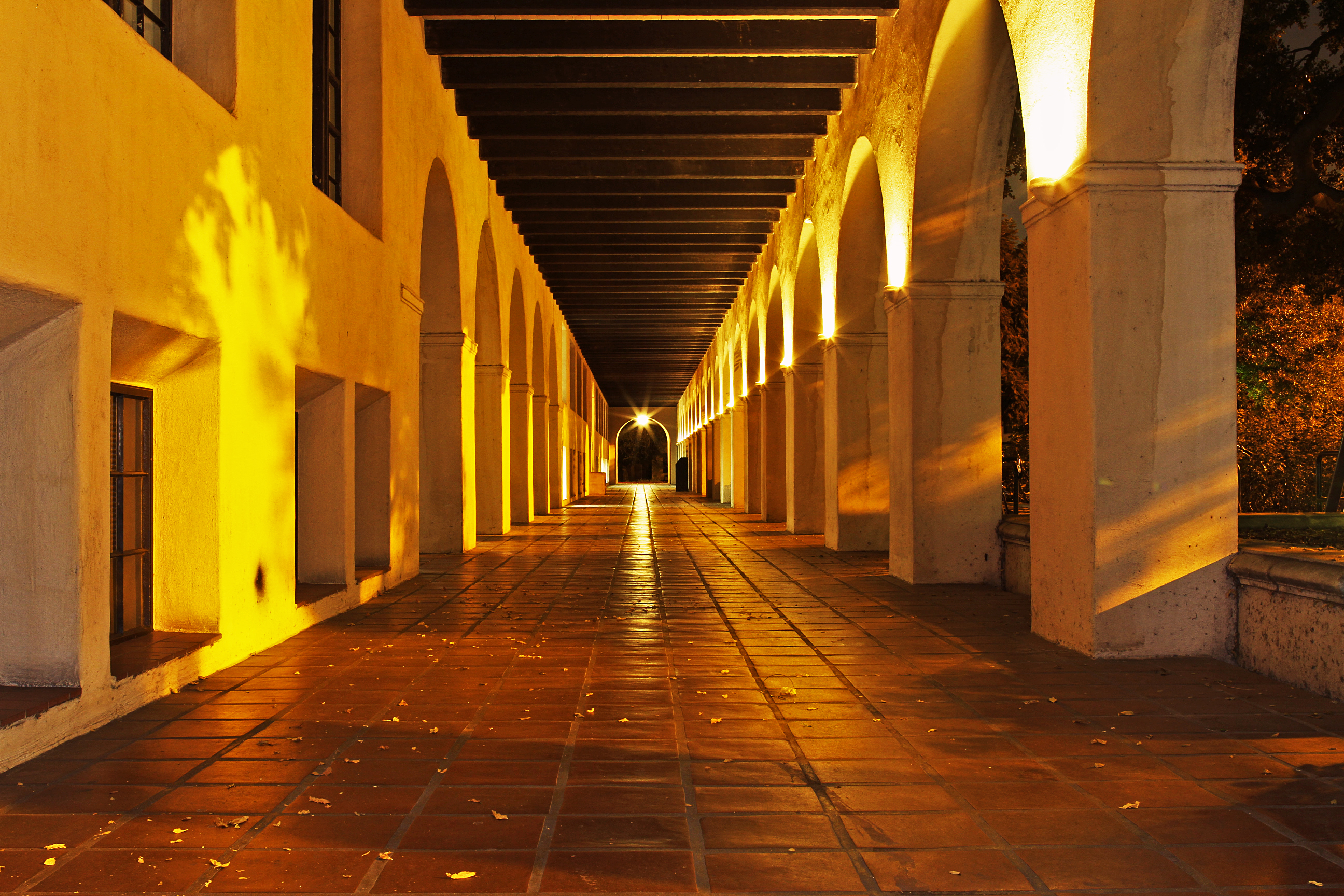
Breezeway of Arms Laboratory

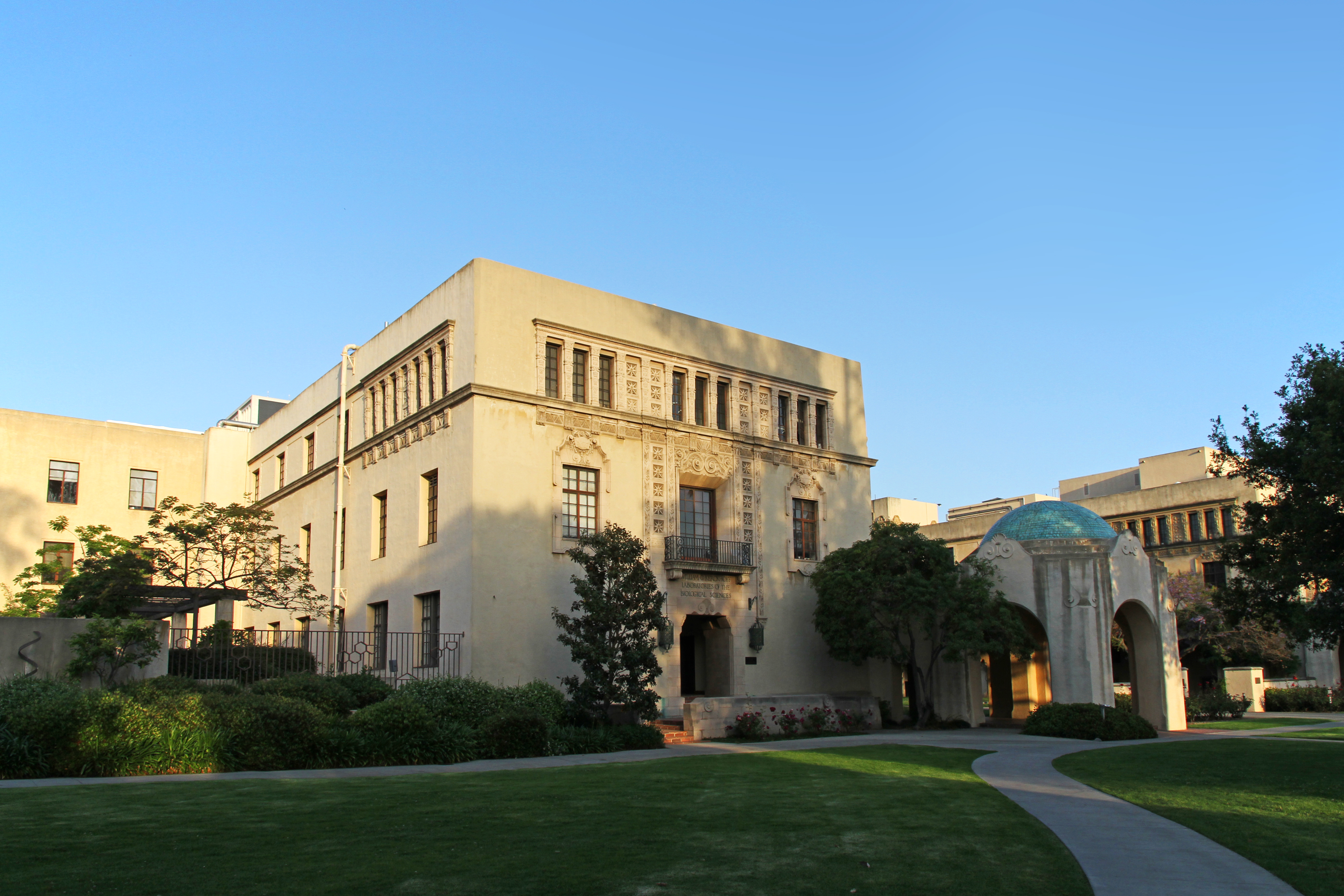
Kerckhoff Laboratory of the Biological Sciences

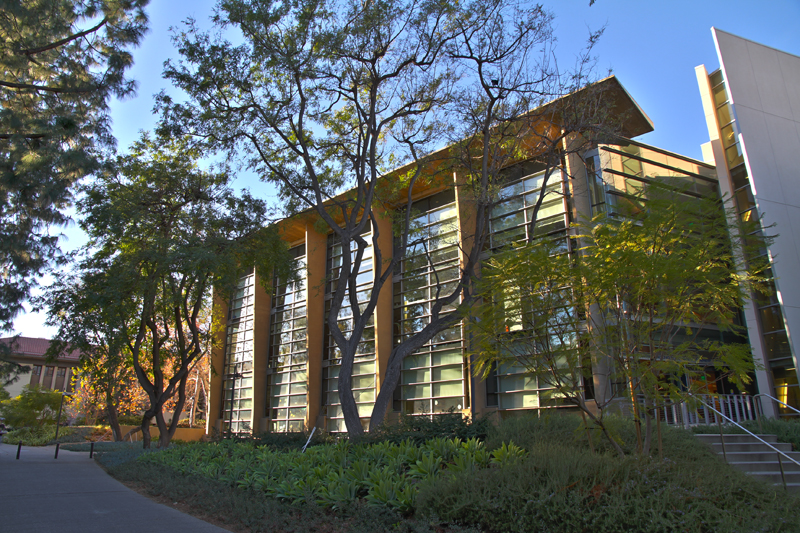
Schlinger Laboratory for Chemistry and Chemical Engineering

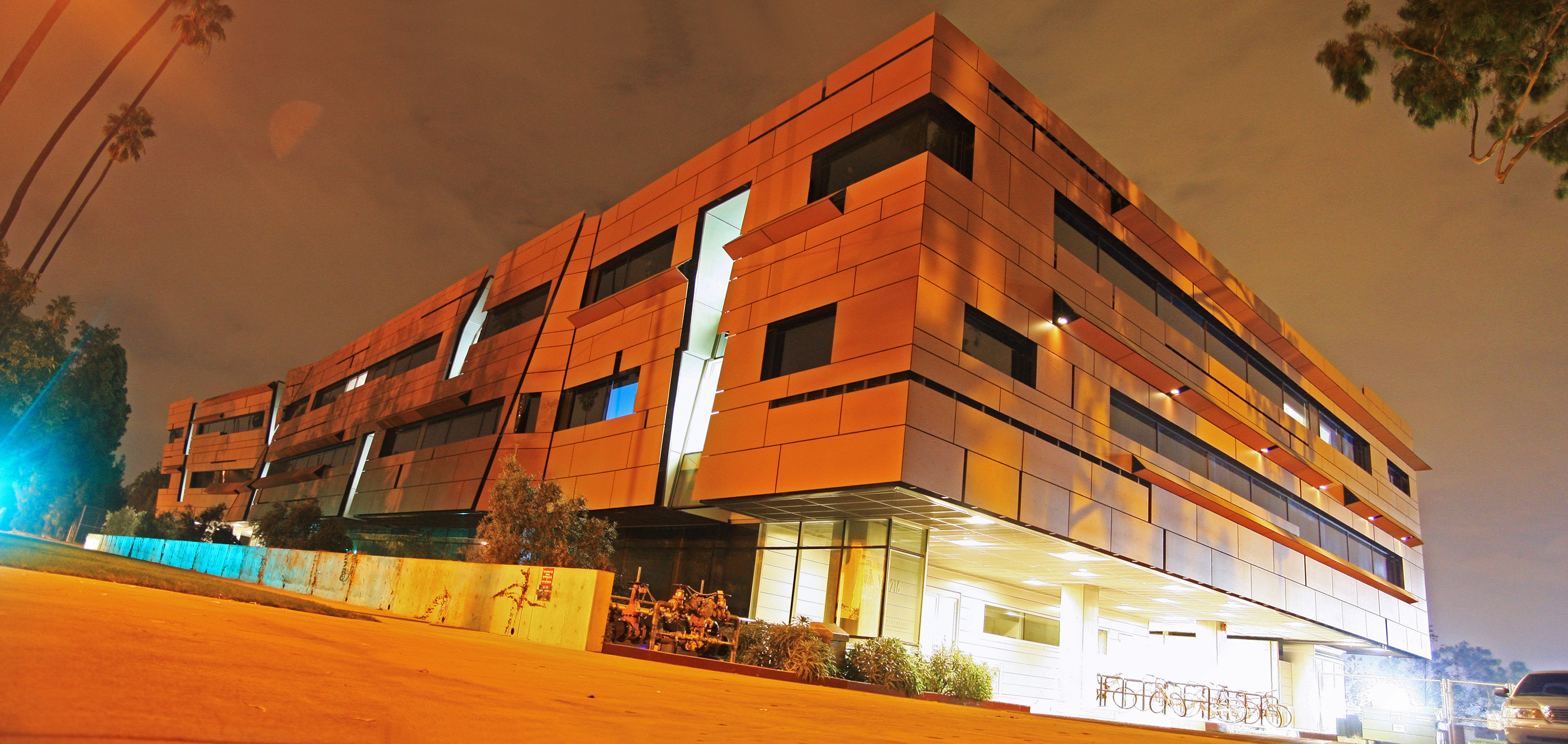
Cahill Center for Astronomy and Astrophysics

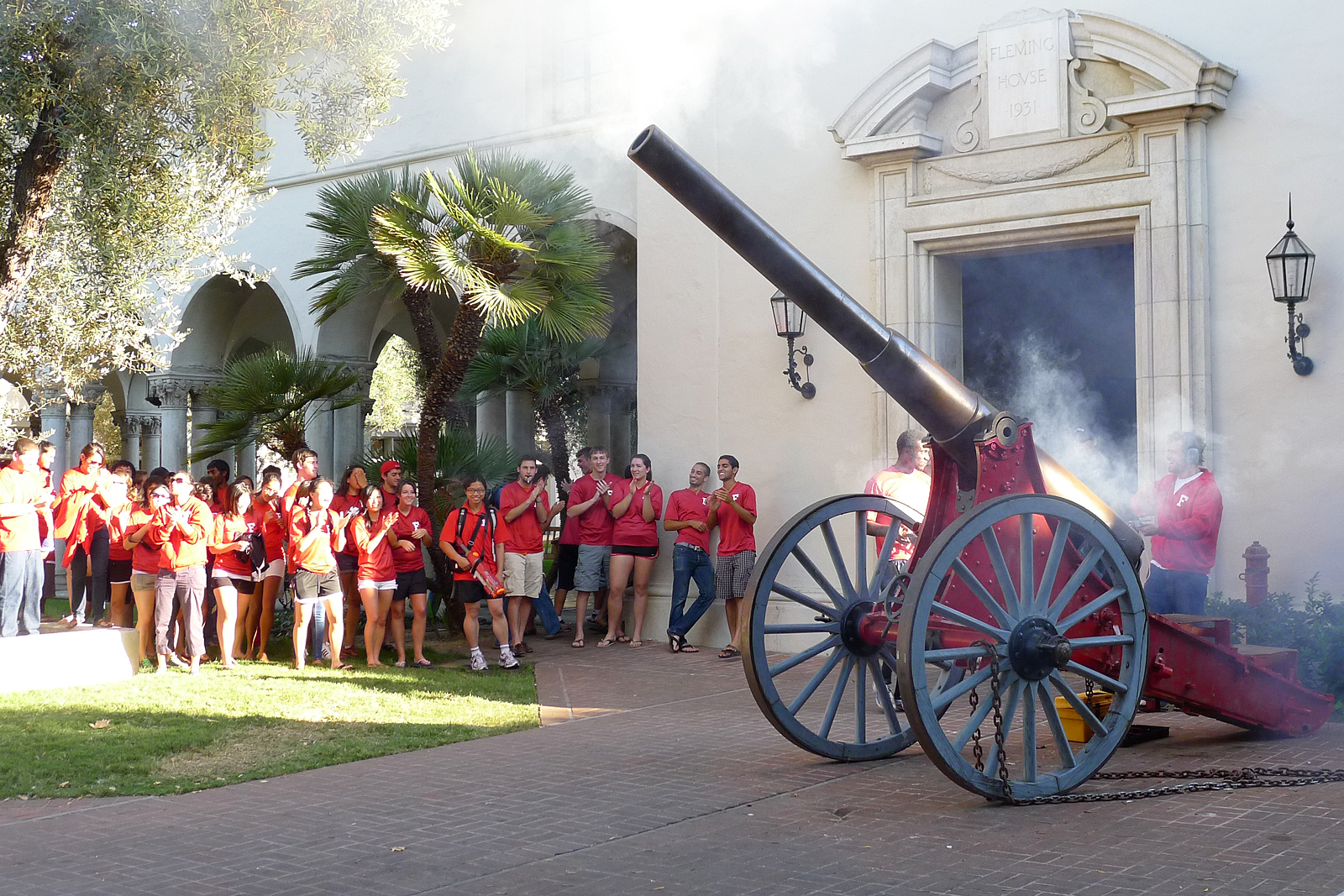
Fleming cannon

== Organization and administration ==
Caltech is incorporated as a non-profit corporation and is governed by a privately appointed 46-member board of trustees who serve five-year terms of office and retire at the age of 72. The trustees elect a president to serve as the chief executive officer of the institute and administer the affairs on the institute on behalf of the board, a provost who serves as the chief academic officer of the institute below the president, and ten other vice presidential and other senior positions. Thomas F. Rosenbaum became the ninth president of Caltech in 2014. Caltech's endowment is governed by a permanent trustee committee and administered by an investment office.

The institute is organized into six primary academic divisions: Biology and Biological Engineering (founded 1927), Chemistry and Chemical Engineering (founded 1926), Engineering and Applied Science (founded 1926), Geological and Planetary Sciences (founded 1927), Humanities and Social Sciences (founded 1926), Physics, Mathematics, and Astronomy (founded 1926). Given Caltech's historical prestige and the small size of its faculty in many major fields, the institution is exceptionally careful in selecting candidates. This rigorous process can result in some positions remaining unfilled for several years until the right candidate is found. Caltech dedicates significant resources to attract top-tier faculty and provides them with substantial financial support to foster their research and academic endeavors. The voting faculty of Caltech include all professors, instructors, research associates and fellows, and the University Librarian. Faculty are responsible for establishing admission requirements, academic standards, and curricula. The Faculty Board is the faculty's representative body and consists of 18 elected faculty representatives as well as other senior administration officials. Full-time professors are expected to teach classes, conduct research, advise students, and perform administrative work such as serving on committees.

Founded in 1930s, the Jet Propulsion Laboratory (JPL) is a federally funded research and development center (FFRDC) owned by NASA and operated as a division of Caltech through a contract between NASA and Caltech. In 2008, JPL spent over $1.6 billion on research and development and employed over 5,000 project-related and support employees. The JPL Director also serves as a Caltech Vice President and is responsible to the President of the Institute for the management of the laboratory.

In December 2023, graduate students and postdoctoral researchers filed to be recognized for collective bargaining as Caltech Grad researchers and Postdocs United, in affiliation with the United Auto Workers (C/GPU-UAW). On January 31 and February 1, 2024, a vote was held by the National Labor Relations Board (NLRB). In February 2024, the NLRB certified that 1335 of 1997 eligible workers voted, with 78% voting in favor of unionization. In May 2024, contract negotiations began. In December 2024, C/GPU-UAW members held a strike authorization vote, 1441 participating in the vote, and 86% voting in favor of authorizing the C/GPU bargaining team to call a strike, if necessary.

== Academics ==
Caltech is a small four-year, highly residential research university with slightly more students in graduate programs than undergraduate. The institute has been accredited by the Western Association of Schools and Colleges since 1949. Caltech is on the quarter system: the fall term starts in late September and ends before Christmas, the second term starts after New Year's Day and ends in mid-March, and the third term starts in late March or early April and ends in early June.

=== Undergraduate admissions ===
Undergraduate admissions statistics
- 2028 entering class
- Admit rate: 2.6% (▼ −3.8)
- Yield rate: 61.2% (▲ +17.3)

Test scores middle 50%
- SAT Total: 1530–1570
- ACT Composite: 35–36

Caltech Undergraduate Admissions Statistics
Year	Admit Rate	Yield Rate
2024	2.6%	61.2%
2023	3.1%	60.2%
2022	2.7%	50.0%
2021	3.9%	52.9%
2020	6.7%	42.0%
2019	6.4%	43.9%

Admission to Caltech is extremely rigorous. Prior to going test blind, Caltech students had the highest test scores in the nation. In admissions for the Class of 2028 (entering 2024), Caltech was ranked the hardest college in America to gain acceptance to by admit rate, at an all-time low of 2.7%. For the freshmen who enrolled in 2019 (Class of 2023) the middle 50% range of SAT were 740–780 for evidence-based reading and writing and 790–800 for math, and 1530–1570 total. The middle 50% range ACT Composite score was 35–36. The SAT Math Level 2 middle 50% range was 800–800. The middle 50% range for the SAT Physics Subject Test was 760–800; SAT Chemistry Subject Test was 760–800; SAT Biology Subject Tests was 760–800. In June 2020, Caltech announced a test-blind policy where they would not require nor consider test scores for the next two years. The moratorium was extended twice, starting July 2021, but was subsequently cancelled starting with the Class of 2029. The institute is need-blind for domestic applicants.

For the Class of 2027 (enrolled Fall 2023), Caltech received 13,136 applications and accepted 412 applicants for a 3.14% admit rate; 270 enrolled. The subsequent year, for the Class of 2028, Caltech reduced the number of seats by almost one hundred, accepting 315 applicants out of approximately 13,000 total applications. For the Class of 2025, 32% were of underrepresented ancestry (which includes students who self-identify as American Indian/Alaska Native, Hispanic/Latino, Black/African American, and/or Native Hawaiian/Pacific Islander), and 6% were foreign students.

=== Tuition and financial aid ===
Undergraduate tuition for the 2021–2022 school year was $56,394 and total annual costs were estimated to be $79,947 excluding the Caltech Student Health Insurance Plan. In 2012–2013, Caltech awarded $17.1 million in need-based aid, $438k in non-need-based aid, and $2.51 million in self-help support to enrolled undergraduate students. The average financial aid package of all students eligible for aid was $38,756 and students graduated with an average debt of $15,090.

=== Undergraduate program ===
The full-time, four-year undergraduate program emphasizes instruction in the arts and sciences and has high graduate coexistence. Caltech offers 28 majors (called "options") and 17 minors across all six academic divisions. Caltech also offers interdisciplinary programs in Applied Physics, Biochemistry, Bioengineering, Computation and Neural Systems, Control and Dynamical Systems, Environmental Science and Engineering, Geobiology and Astrobiology, Geochemistry, and Planetary Astronomy. The most popular options are Chemical Engineering, Computer Science, Electrical Engineering, Mechanical Engineering and Physics. The most popular majors of the class of 2023 were Computer Science, Mechanical Engineering, Physics, and Electrical Engineering.

All undergraduates are required to complete the core curriculum, which consists of 108 units typically completed in the first two years, providing a rigorous foundation in science, mathematics, humanities, and physical education to develop analytical and interdisciplinary skills. It includes 3 terms of mathematics, 3 terms of physics, 2 terms of chemistry, 1 term of biology, a 1 term "menu" course, 1 term of computer science, a scientific writing requirement, 1 term of physical education, and 11 terms of humanities and social science, with placement exams allowing advanced students to substitute introductory courses and a pass/no-record grading system in the freshman fall term to ease academic pressure. Prior to the entering class of 2013, Caltech required students to take a core curriculum of five terms of mathematics, five terms of physics, two terms of chemistry, one term of biology, two terms of lab courses, one term of scientific communication, three terms of physical education, and 12 terms of humanities and social science. Since 2013, only three terms each of mathematics and physics have been required by the institute, with the remaining two terms each required by certain options.

A typical class is worth 9 academic units and given the extensive core curriculum requirements in addition to individual options' degree requirements, students need to take an average of 40.5 units per term (more than four classes) to graduate in four years. 36 units is the minimum full-time load, 48 units is considered a heavy load, and registrations above 51 units require an overload petition. Approximately 20 percent of students double-major. This is achievable since the humanities and social sciences majors have been designed to be done in conjunction with a science major. Although choosing two options in the same division is discouraged, it is still possible.

First-year students are enrolled in first-term classes based upon results of placement exams in math, physics, chemistry, and writing and take all classes in their first two terms on a Pass/Fail basis. There is little competition; collaboration on homework is encouraged and the honor system encourages take-home tests and flexible homework schedules. Caltech offers co-operative programs with other schools, such as the Pasadena Art Center College of Design and Occidental College.

According to a 2018 PayScale study, Caltech graduates earn a median early career salary of $83,400 and $143,100 mid-career, placing them in the top 5 among graduates of US colleges and universities. The average net return on investment over a period of 20 years is $887,000, the tenth-highest among US colleges.

Caltech offers Army and Air Force ROTC in cooperation with the University of Southern California.

=== Graduate program ===
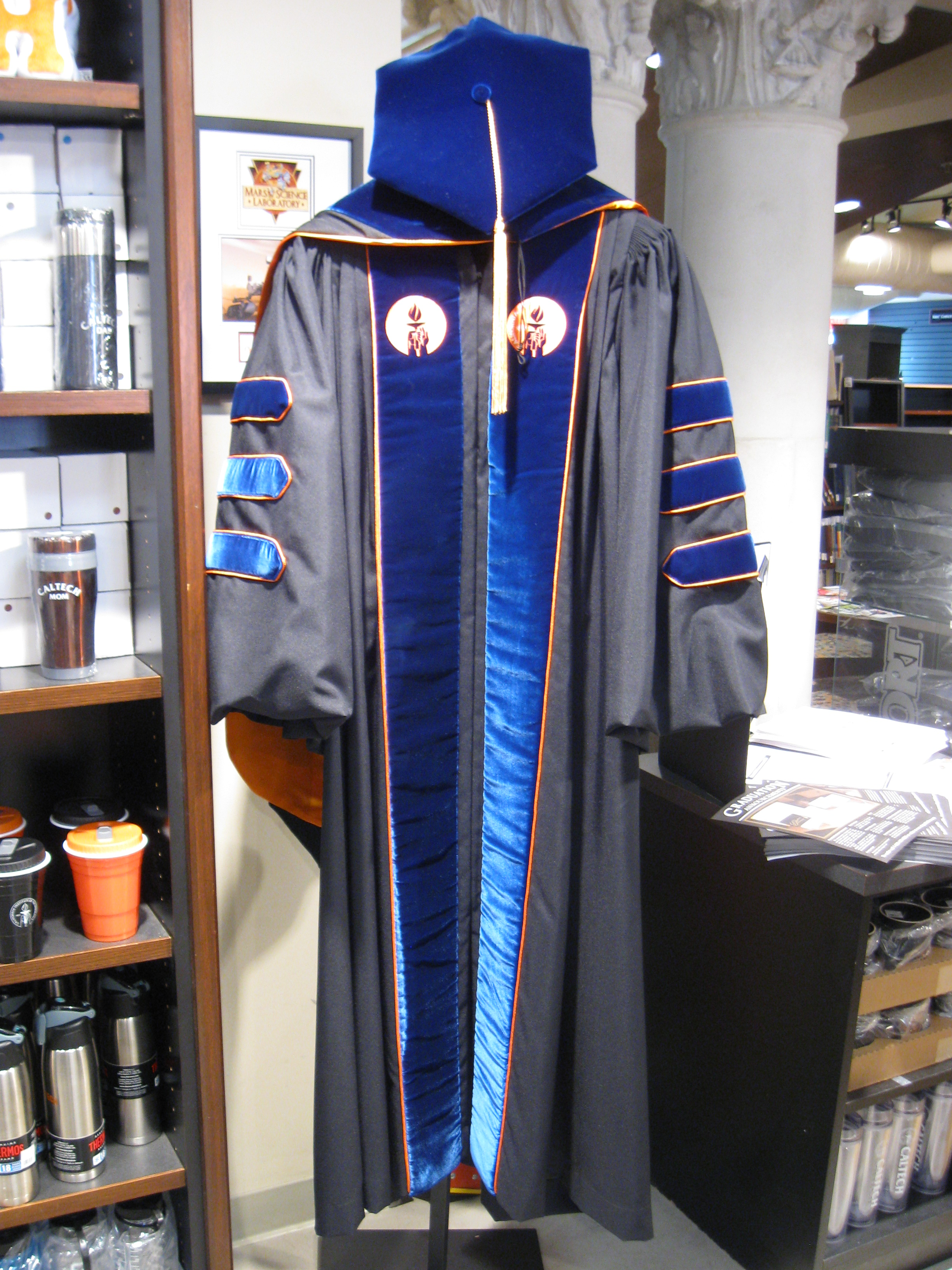
Doctoral regalia of the California Institute of Technology

Admission to Caltech's graduate study is highly competitive, with faculty evaluating factors such as academic preparation, research experience, scientific interests, and recommendations from teachers or mentors. A key aspect of the admission process is the matching of faculty and an applicant's research interests. Historically, many programs required applicants to submit GRE scores. However, in recent years, many departments have made the GRE optional or no longer require it at all.

The graduate instructional programs emphasize doctoral studies and are dominated by science, technology, engineering, and mathematics fields. The institute offers graduate degree programs for the Master of Science, Engineer's Degree, Doctor of Philosophy, BS/MS and MD/PhD, with the majority of students in the PhD program. The most popular options are Chemistry, Physics, Biology, Electrical Engineering, and Chemical Engineering.

Initially, most new graduate students are assigned a temporary advisor, allowing time to select a permanent advisor. To aid in this, some graduate options include rotations in research labs, facilitating a better match with faculty research groups that align with the students' scientific interests. Up to three rotations in the first year are allowed in some options.

Caltech provides on-campus housing options for incoming graduate students. All new graduate students are guaranteed housing in their first year, with a variety of living experiences available to suit different needs. Approximately half of Caltech's graduate student population resides in campus housing. Post-first year, students participate in a housing lottery, with the results announced two months prior to the contract end date, aiding in planning for those who need to seek off-campus housing.

The research facilities at Caltech are available to graduate students, but there are opportunities for students to work in facilities of other universities, research centers (such as NASA's Jet Propulsion Laboratory), and private industries. The graduate student to faculty ratio is 4:1. Joint programs also exist between Caltech and the Keck School of Medicine of the University of Southern California, the UCLA David Geffen School of Medicine, and the Kaiser Permanente Bernard J. Tyson School of Medicine, which grants MD/PhD degrees. Students in this program do their preclinical and clinical work at USC, UCLA, or KPSOM, and their PhD work with any member of the Caltech faculty, including the Biology, Chemistry, and Engineering and Applied Sciences Divisions. The MD degree would be from the student's respective medical school and the PhD would be awarded from Caltech.

Approximately 99 percent of doctoral students have full financial support. Financial support for graduate students comes in the form of fellowships, research assistantships, teaching assistantships or a combination of fellowship and assistantship support.

Graduate students are bound by the same honor code as the undergraduates, allowing for take-home examinations. The Graduate Honor Council oversees any violations of the code.

=== Rankings ===
Academic rankings

National
- Forbes: 7
- U.S. News & World Report: 5
- Washington Monthly: 54
- WSJ/College Pulse: 18

Global
- ARWU: 10
- QS: 7
- THE: 7
- U.S. News & World Report: 23

National Program Rankings (as of 2022)
Program	Ranking
Chemistry	1
Earth Sciences	1
Physics	3
Biological Sciences	4
Engineering	4
Mathematics	9
Computer Science	11

Global Subject Rankings (as of 2019)
Program	Ranking
Space Science	1
Geosciences	1
Physics	6
Chemistry	10
Biology & Biochemistry	29
Engineering	52
Materials Science	57
Molecular Biology & Genetics	57
Neuroscience & Behavior	77
Mathematics	80
Electrical & Electronic Engineering	100

Caltech was ranked within the top ten universities in the world by the Times Higher Education World University Rankings, QS World University Rankings, and Academic Ranking of World Universities. For 2022, U.S. News & World Report ranked Caltech as tied for 9th in the United States among national universities overall, 11th for most innovative, and 15th for best value. U.S. News & World Report also ranked the graduate programs in chemistry and earth sciences first among national universities.

== Research ==
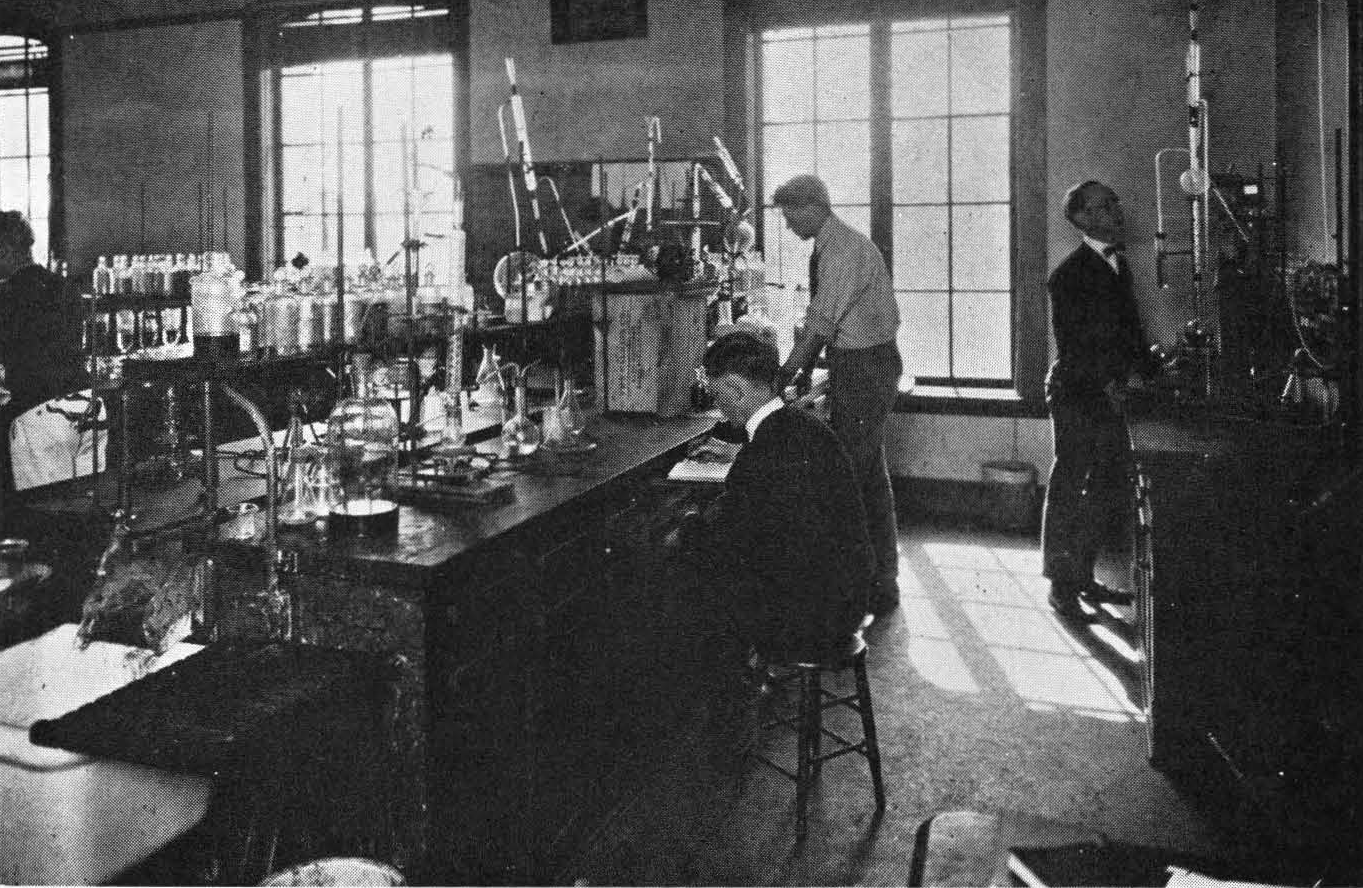
Chemists working at Caltech in 1923

Caltech is classified among "R1: Doctoral Universities – Very High Research Activity". Caltech was elected to the Association of American Universities in 1934 and remains a research university with "very high" research activity, primarily in STEM fields. Caltech manages research expenditures of $270 million annually, 66th among all universities in the U.S. and 17th among private institutions without medical schools for 2008. The largest federal agencies contributing to research are NASA, National Science Foundation, Department of Health and Human Services, Department of Defense, and Department of Energy. Caltech received $144 million in federal funding for the physical sciences, $40.8 million for the life sciences, $33.5 million for engineering, $14.4 million for environmental sciences, $7.16 million for computer sciences, and $1.97 million for mathematical sciences in 2008.

The institute was awarded an all-time high funding of $357 million in 2009. Active funding from the National Science Foundation Directorate of Mathematical and Physical Science (MPS) for Caltech stands at $343 million as of 2011, the highest for any educational institution in the nation, and higher than the total funds allocated to any state except California and New York.

In 2005, Caltech had 739,000 square feet (68,700 m^{2}) dedicated to research: 330,000 square feet (30,700 m^{2}) to physical sciences, 163,000 square feet (15,100 m^{2}) to engineering, and 160,000 square feet (14,900 m^{2}) to biological sciences.

In addition to managing JPL, Caltech also operates the Palomar Observatory in San Diego County, the Owens Valley Radio Observatory in Bishop, California, the Submillimeter Observatory and W. M. Keck Observatory at the Mauna Kea Observatory, the Laser Interferometer Gravitational-Wave Observatory at Livingston, Louisiana and Richland, Washington, and Kerckhoff Marine Laboratory in Corona del Mar, California. The Institute launched the Kavli Nanoscience Institute at Caltech in 2006, the Keck Institute for Space Studies in 2008, and is also the current home for the Einstein Papers Project. The Spitzer Science Center (SSC), part of the Infrared Processing and Analysis Center located on the Caltech campus, is the data analysis and community support center for NASA's Spitzer Space Telescope.

Caltech partnered with UCLA to establish a Joint Center for Translational Medicine (UCLA-Caltech JCTM), which conducts experimental research into clinical applications, including the diagnosis and treatment of diseases such as cancer. In 1997, Caltech partnered with UCLA to train physician-scientists.

Caltech operates several TCCON stations as part of an international collaborative effort of measuring greenhouse gases globally. One station is on campus.

Undergraduates at Caltech are also encouraged to participate in research. About 80% of the class of 2010 did research through the annual Summer Undergraduate Research Fellowships (SURF) program at least once during their stay, and many continued during the school year. Students write and submit SURF proposals for research projects in collaboration with professors, and about 70 percent of applicants are awarded SURFs. The program is open to both Caltech and non-Caltech undergraduate students. It serves as preparation for graduate school and helps to explain why Caltech has the highest percentage of alumni who go on to receive a PhD of all the major universities.

The licensing and transferring of technology to the commercial sector is managed by the Office of Technology Transfer (OTT). OTT protects and manages the intellectual property developed by faculty members, students, other researchers, and JPL technologists. Caltech receives more invention disclosures per faculty member than any other university in the nation. As of 2008, 1891 patents were granted to Caltech researchers since 1969.

== Students ==
Student body composition as of July 16, 2023
Race and ethnicity	Total
Asian	35%
White	23%
Hispanic	22%
Other (Note: Other consists of Multiracial Americans and those who prefer to not say.)	9%
Foreign national	8%
Black	3%
Economic diversity
Low-income (Note: The percentage of students who received an income-based federal Pell grant intended for low-income students.)	11%
Affluent (Note: The percentage of students who are a part of the American middle class at the bare minimum.)	89%

Caltech enrolled 987 undergraduate students and 1,443 graduate students for the 2024–2025 school year. Women made up 45% of the undergraduate and 36% of the graduate student body. The racial demographics of the school substantially differ from those of the nation as a whole.

The four-year graduation rate is 79% and the six-year rate is 92%, which is low compared to most leading U.S. universities, but substantially higher than it was in the 1960s and 1970s. Students majoring in STEM fields traditionally have graduation rates below 70%.

Table notes:

== Student life ==
=== House system ===
During the early 20th century, a Caltech committee visited several universities and decided to transform the undergraduate housing system from fraternities to a house system. Four South Houses (or Hovses, as styled in the stone engravings) were built: Blacker House, Dabney House, Fleming House and Ricketts House. In the 1960s, three North Houses were built: Lloyd House, Page House, and Ruddock House, and during the 1990s, Avery House. The four South Houses closed for renovation in 2005 and reopened in 2006. The latest addition to residential life at Caltech is Bechtel Residence, which opened in 2018. It is not affiliated with the house system. All first- and second-year students live on campus in the house system or in the Bechtel Residence.

On account of Albert B. Ruddock's affiliation with the Human Betterment Foundation, in January 2021, the Caltech Board of Trustees authorized the removal of Ruddock's name from campus buildings. Ruddock House was renamed as the Grant D. Venerable House.

=== Athletics ===
Caltech athletics wordmark

Caltech has athletic teams in baseball, men's and women's basketball, cross country, men's and women's soccer, swimming and diving, men's and women's tennis, track and field, women's volleyball, and men's and women's water polo. Caltech's mascot is the Beaver, a homage to nature's engineer. Its teams are members of the NCAA Division III and compete in the Southern California Intercollegiate Athletic Conference (SCIAC), which Caltech co-founded in 1915.

On January 6, 2007, the Beavers' men's basketball team snapped a 207-game losing streak to Division III schools, beating Bard College 81–52. It was their first Division III victory since 1996. Until their win over Occidental College on February 22, 2011 the team had not won a game in SCIAC play since 1985. Ryan Elmquist's free throw with 3.3 seconds in regulation gave the Beavers the victory. The documentary film Quantum Hoops concerns the events of the Beavers' 2005–06 season.

On January 13, 2007, the Caltech women's basketball team snapped a 50-game losing streak, defeating the Pomona-Pitzer Sagehens 55–53. The women's program, which entered the SCIAC in 2002, garnered their first conference win. On the bench as honorary coach for the evening was Robert Grubbs, 2005 Nobel laureate in Chemistry. The team went on to beat Whittier College on February 10, for its second SCIAC win, and placed its first member on the All Conference team.

In 2007, 2008, and 2009, the women's table tennis team (a club team) competed in nationals. The women's Ultimate club team, known as "Snatch", has also been very successful in recent years, ranking 44 of over 200 college teams in the Ultimate Player's Association.

On February 2, 2013, the Caltech baseball team ended a 228-game losing streak, the team's first win in nearly 10 years.

The track and field team's home venue is at the South Athletic Field in Tournament Park, the site of the first eight Rose Bowl games.

The school also sponsored an intercollegiate football team from 1973 through 1977, and played part of its home schedule at the Rose Bowl.

=== Performing and visual arts ===
The Caltech/Occidental College Orchestra is a full seventy-piece orchestra composed of students, faculty, and staff at Caltech and nearby Occidental College. The orchestra gives three pairs of concerts annually, at both Caltech and Occidental College. There are also two Caltech Jazz Bands and a Concert Band, as well as an active chamber music program. For vocal music, Caltech has a mixed-voice Glee Club and the smaller Chamber Singers. The theater program at Caltech is known as TACIT, or Theater Arts at the California Institute of Technology. There are two to three plays organized by TACIT per year, and they were involved in the production of the PHD Movie, released in 2011.

=== Student life traditions ===
==== Annual events ====
Every Halloween, Dabney House conducts the infamous "Millikan pumpkin-drop experiment" from the top of Millikan Library, the highest point on campus. According to tradition, a claim was once made that the shattering of a pumpkin frozen in liquid nitrogen and dropped from a sufficient height would produce a triboluminescent spark. This yearly event involves a crowd of observers, who try to spot the elusive spark. The title of the event is an oblique reference to the famous Millikan oil-drop experiment which measured e, the elemental unit of electrical charge.

On Ditch Day, the seniors ditch school, leaving behind elaborately designed tasks and traps at the doors of their rooms to prevent underclassmen from entering. Over the years this has evolved to the point where many seniors spend months designing mechanical, electrical, and software obstacles to confound the underclassmen. Each group of seniors designs a "stack" to be solved by a handful of underclassmen. The faculty have been drawn into the event as well, and cancel all classes on Ditch Day so the underclassmen can participate in what has become a highlight of the academic year.

Another long-standing tradition is the playing of Wagner's "Ride of the Valkyries" at 7:00 each morning during finals week with the largest, loudest speakers available. The playing of that piece is not allowed at any other time (except if one happens to be listening to the entire 14 hours and 5 minutes of The Ring Cycle), and any offender is dragged into the showers to be drenched in cold water fully dressed.

==== Pranks ====
Caltech students have been known for their many pranks (also known as "RFs").

The two most famous in recent history are the changing of the Hollywood Sign to read "Caltech", by judiciously covering up certain parts of the letters, and the changing of the scoreboard to read Caltech 38, MIT 9 during the 1984 Rose Bowl Game. But the most famous of all occurred during the 1961 Rose Bowl Game, where Caltech students altered the flip-cards that were raised by the stadium attendees to display "Caltech", and several other "unintended" messages. This event is now referred to as the Great Rose Bowl Hoax.

During the Presidency of Bill Clinton students released a banner stating "Impeach Nixon" while Clinton was on the campus. Graeme Wood stated, "mockery and mischief, not politics, were the point."

Circa 2006, pranking had been officially encouraged by Tom Mannion, Caltech's Assistant VP for Student Affairs and Campus Life. "The grand old days of pranking have gone away at Caltech, and that's what we are trying to bring back", reported The Boston Globe.

In December 2011, Caltech students went to New York and pulled a prank in Manhattan's Greenwich Village. The prank involved making The Cube sculpture look like the Aperture Science Weighted Companion Cube from the video game Portal.

Caltech pranks have been documented in three Legends of Caltech books, the most recent of which was edited by alumni Autumn Looijen '99 and Mason Porter '98 and published in May 2007.

===== Rivalry with MIT =====
In 2005, a group of Caltech students pulled a string of pranks during MIT's Campus Preview Weekend for admitted students. These include covering up the word Massachusetts in the "Massachusetts Institute of Technology" engraving on the main building façade with a banner so that it read "That Other Institute of Technology". A group of MIT hackers responded by altering the banner so that the inscription read "The Only Institute of Technology". Caltech students also passed out T-shirts to MIT's incoming freshman class that had MIT written on the front and "... because not everyone can go to Caltech" along with an image of a palm tree on the back.

MIT retaliated in April 2006, when students posing as the Howe & Ser (Howitzer) Moving Company stole the 130-year-old, 1.7-ton Fleming House cannon and moved it over 3,000 miles to their campus in Cambridge, Massachusetts for their 2006 Campus Preview Weekend, repeating a similar prank performed by nearby Harvey Mudd College in 1986. Thirty members of Fleming House traveled to MIT and reclaimed their cannon on April 10, 2006.

On April 13, 2007 (Friday the 13th), a group of students from The California Tech, Caltech's campus newspaper, arrived and distributed fake copies of The Tech, MIT's campus newspaper, while prospective students were visiting for their Campus Preview Weekend. Articles included "MIT Invents the Interweb", "Architects Deem Campus 'Unfortunate'", and "Infinite Corridor Not Actually Infinite".

In December 2009, some Caltech students declared that MIT had been sold and had become the Caltech East campus. A "sold" banner was hung on front of the MIT dome building and a "Welcome to Caltech East: School of the Humanities" banner over the Massachusetts Avenue Entrance. Newspapers and T-shirts were distributed, and door labels and fliers in the infinite corridor were put up in accordance with the "curriculum change".

In September 2010, MIT students attempted to put a TARDIS, the time machine from the BBC's Doctor Who, onto a roof. Caught in mid-act, the prank was aborted. In January 2011, Caltech students in conjunction with MIT students helped put the TARDIS on top of Baxter. Caltech students then moved the TARDIS to UC Berkeley and Stanford.

In April 2014, during MIT's Campus Preview Weekend, a group of Caltech students handed out mugs emblazoned with the MIT logo on the front and the words "The Institute of Technology" on the back. When heated, the mugs turn orange, display a palm tree, and read "Caltech The Hotter Institute of Technology". Identical mugs continue to be sold at the Caltech campus store.

==== Honor code ====
Life in the Caltech community is governed by the honor code, which simply states: "No member of the Caltech community shall take unfair advantage of any other member of the Caltech community." This is enforced by a Board of Control, which consists of undergraduate students, and by a similar body at the graduate level, called the Graduate Honor Council.

The honor code aims at promoting an atmosphere of respect and trust that allows Caltech students to enjoy privileges that make for a more relaxed atmosphere. For example, the honor code allows professors to make the majority of exams as take-home, allowing students to take them on their own schedule and in their preferred environment.

Through the late 1990s, the only exception to the honor code, implemented earlier in the decade in response to changes in federal regulations, concerned the sexual harassment policy. Today, there are myriad exceptions to the honor code in the form of new Institute policies such as the fire policy and alcohol policy. Although both policies are presented in the Honor System Handbook given to new members of the Caltech community, some undergraduates regard them as a slight against the honor code and the implicit trust and respect it represents within the community. In recent years, the Student Affairs Office has also taken up pursuing investigations independently of the Board of Control and Conduct Review Committee, an implicit violation of both the honor code and written disciplinary policy that has contributed to further erosion of trust between some parts of the undergraduate community and the administration.

== Notable people ==
As of October 2025, Caltech has 48 Nobel laureates to its name awarded to 26 alumni, 5 postdocs, and 17 non-alumni professors. The 26 alumni include five Caltech professors (Carl D. Anderson, Linus Pauling, William A. Fowler, Edward B. Lewis, and Kip Thorne). Among the 17 non-alumni professors, 14 were in residence at Caltech at the time of the award; David Baltimore, who shared the Prize in Physiology or Medicine in 1975, became Caltech President in 1997; Renato Dulbecco, who shared the Prize in Physiology or Medicine in 1975, credited his Prize to the time he had spent at Caltech; John Hopfield, who won the Prize in Physics in 2024, is the Dickinson Professor Emeritus at Caltech. The total number of Nobel Prizes is 49 because Pauling received prizes in both Chemistry and Peace. Eight faculty and alumni have received a Crafoord Prize from the Royal Swedish Academy of Sciences, while 58 have been awarded the U.S. National Medal of Science, and 11 have received the National Medal of Technology. One alumnus, Stanislav Smirnov, won the Fields Medal in 2010. Other distinguished researchers have been affiliated with Caltech as postdoctoral scholars (for example, Barbara McClintock, James D. Watson, Sheldon Glashow and John Gurdon) or visiting professors (for example, Albert Einstein, Stephen Hawking and Edward Witten).

=== Alumni ===
There are 22,930 total living alumni in the U.S. and around the world. As of October 2022, 30 alumni and 16 non-alumni faculty have won the Nobel Prize. The Turing Award, the "Nobel Prize of Computer Science", has been awarded to six alumni, and one has won the Fields Medal.

Many alumni have participated in scientific research. Some have concentrated their studies on the very small universe of atoms and molecules. Nobel laureate Carl D. Anderson (BS 1927, PhD 1930) proved the existence of positrons and muons, Nobel laureate Edwin McMillan (BS 1928, MS 1929) synthesized the first transuranium element, Nobel laureate Leo James Rainwater (BS 1939) investigated the non-spherical shapes of atomic nuclei, and Nobel laureate Douglas D. Osheroff (BS 1967) studied the superfluid nature of helium-3. Donald Knuth (PhD 1963), the "father" of the analysis of algorithms, wrote The Art of Computer Programming and created the TeX computer typesetting system, which is commonly used in the scientific community. Bruce Reznick (BS 1973) is a mathematician noted for his contributions to number theory and the combinatorial-algebraic-analytic investigations of polynomials. Narendra Karmarkar (MS 1979) is known for the interior point method, a polynomial algorithm for linear programming known as Karmarkar's algorithm.

Other alumni have turned their gaze to the universe. C. Gordon Fullerton (BS 1957, MS 1958) piloted the third Space Shuttle mission. Astronaut (and later, United States Senator) Harrison Schmitt (BS 1957) was the only geologist to have walked on the surface of the Moon. Astronomer Eugene Merle Shoemaker (BS 1947, MS 1948) co-discovered Comet Shoemaker-Levy 9 (a comet which crashed into the planet Jupiter) and was the first person buried on the Moon (by having his ashes crashed into the Moon). Astronomer George O. Abell (BS 1951, MS 1952, PhD 1957) while a grad student at Caltech participated in the National Geographic Society-Palomar Sky Survey. This ultimately resulted in the publication of the Abell Catalogue of Clusters of Galaxies, the definitive work in the field.

Undergraduate alumni founded, or co-founded, companies such as LCD manufacturer Varitronix, Hotmail, Compaq, MathWorks (which created Matlab), and database provider Imply, while graduate students founded, or co-founded, companies such as Intel, TRW, and the non-profit educational organization, the Exploratorium.

Arnold Beckman (PhD 1928) invented the pH meter and commercialized it with the founding of Beckman Instruments. His success with that company enabled him to provide seed funding for William Shockley (BS 1932), who had co-invented semiconductor transistors and wanted to commercialize them. Shockley became the founding Director of the Shockley Semiconductor Laboratory division of Beckman Instruments. Shockley had previously worked at Bell Labs, whose first president was another alumnus, Frank Jewett (BS 1898). Because his aging mother lived in Palo Alto, California, Shockley established his laboratory near her in Mountain View, California. Shockley was a co-recipient of the Nobel Prize in Physics in 1956, but his aggressive management style and odd personality at the Shockley Lab became unbearable. In late 1957, eight of his researchers resigned and with support from Sherman Fairchild formed Fairchild Semiconductor. Among the "traitorous eight" was Gordon E. Moore (PhD 1954), who later left Fairchild to co-found Intel. Other offspring companies of Fairchild Semiconductor include National Semiconductor and Advanced Micro Devices, which in turn spawned more technology companies in the area. Shockley's decision to use silicon instead of germanium as the semiconductor material, coupled with the abundance of silicon semiconductor related companies in the area, gave rise to the term "Silicon Valley" to describe that geographic region surrounding Palo Alto.

Caltech alumni also held public offices, with Mustafa A. G. Abushagur (PhD 1984) the Deputy Prime Minister of Libya and Prime Minister-Elect of Libya, James Fletcher (PhD 1948) the 4th and 7th Administrator of NASA, Steven Koonin (PhD 1972) the Undersecretary of Energy for Science, and Regina Dugan (PhD 1993) the 19th director of DARPA. The 20th director for DARPA, Arati Prabhakar, is also a Caltech alumna (PhD 1984) as well as Charles Elachi (Phd 1971), former director of the Jet Propulsion Lab. Arvind Virmani is a former Chief Economic Adviser to the Government of India. In 2013, President Barack Obama announced the nomination of France Cordova (PhD 1979) as the director of the National Science Foundation and Ellen Williams (PhD 1982) as the director for ARPA-E.

Caltech Magazine is Caltech's alumni magazine, and was known as Engineering & Science from 1937-2016.

Notable Caltech alumni include:

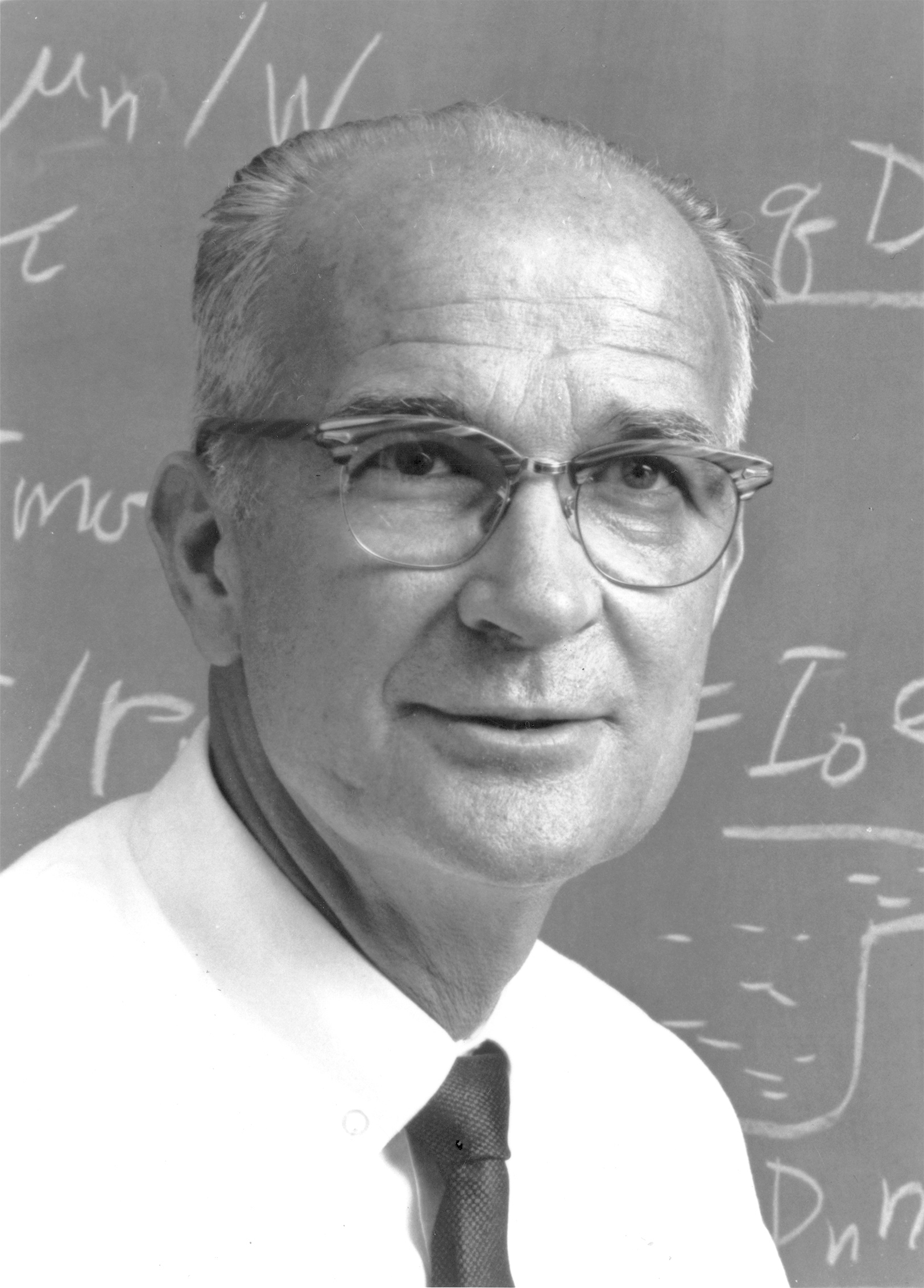
Nobel laureate William Shockley, BS 1932, co-inventor of the solid state transistor, father of Silicon Valley

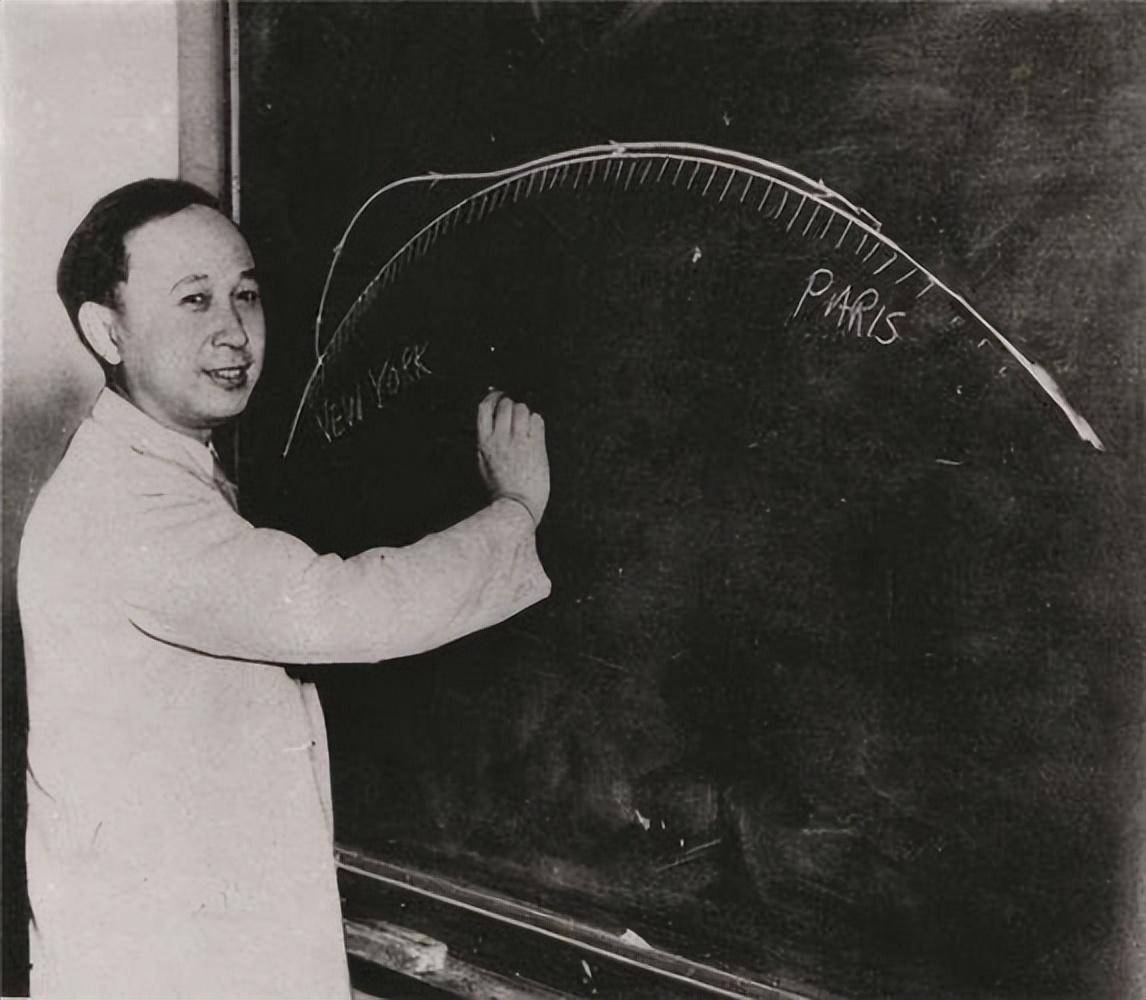
Qian Xuesen, PhD 1939, co-founder of JPL, "Father" of Chinese rocketry

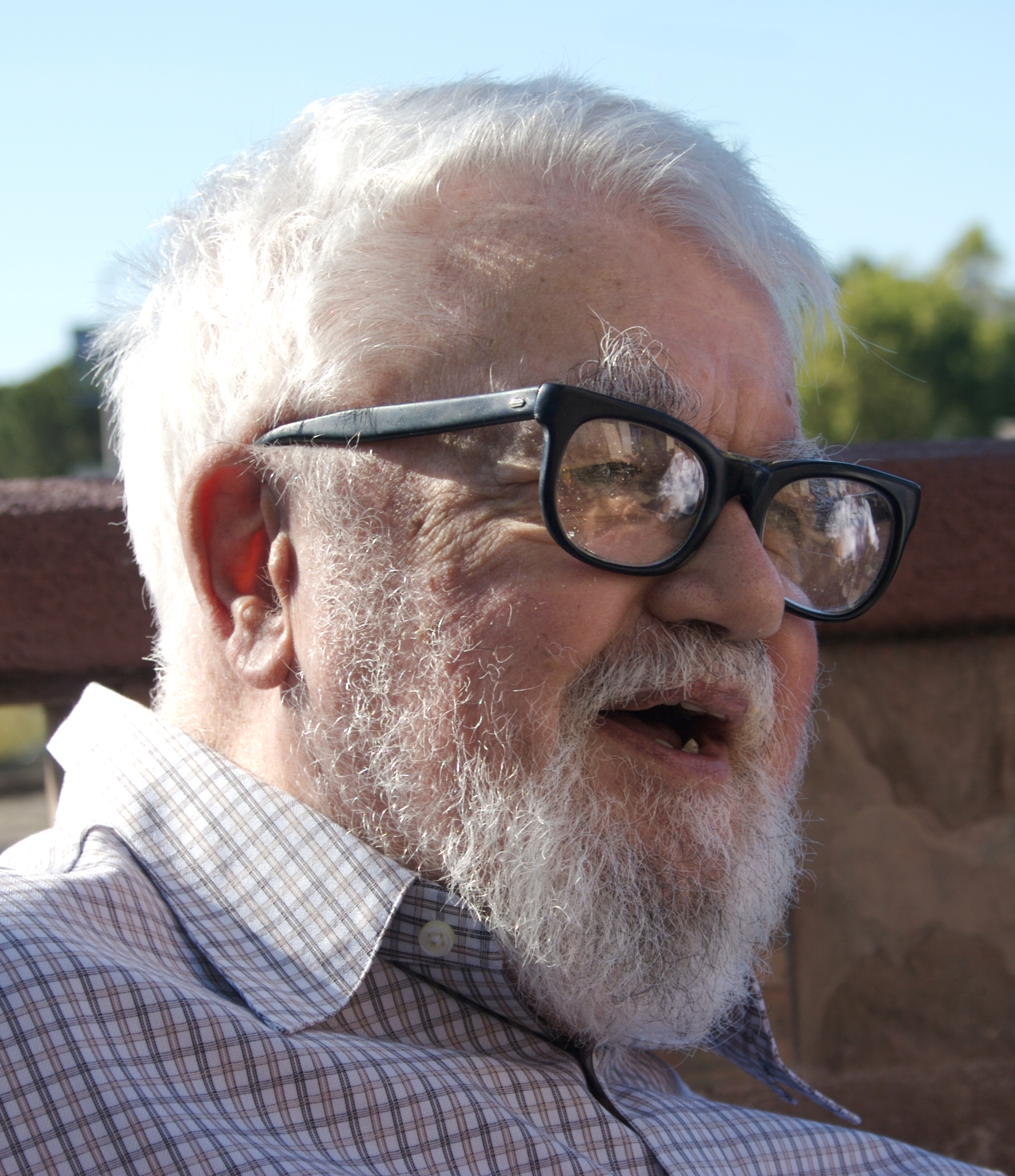
Turing Award laureate John McCarthy, BS 1948, inventor of the Lisp programming language

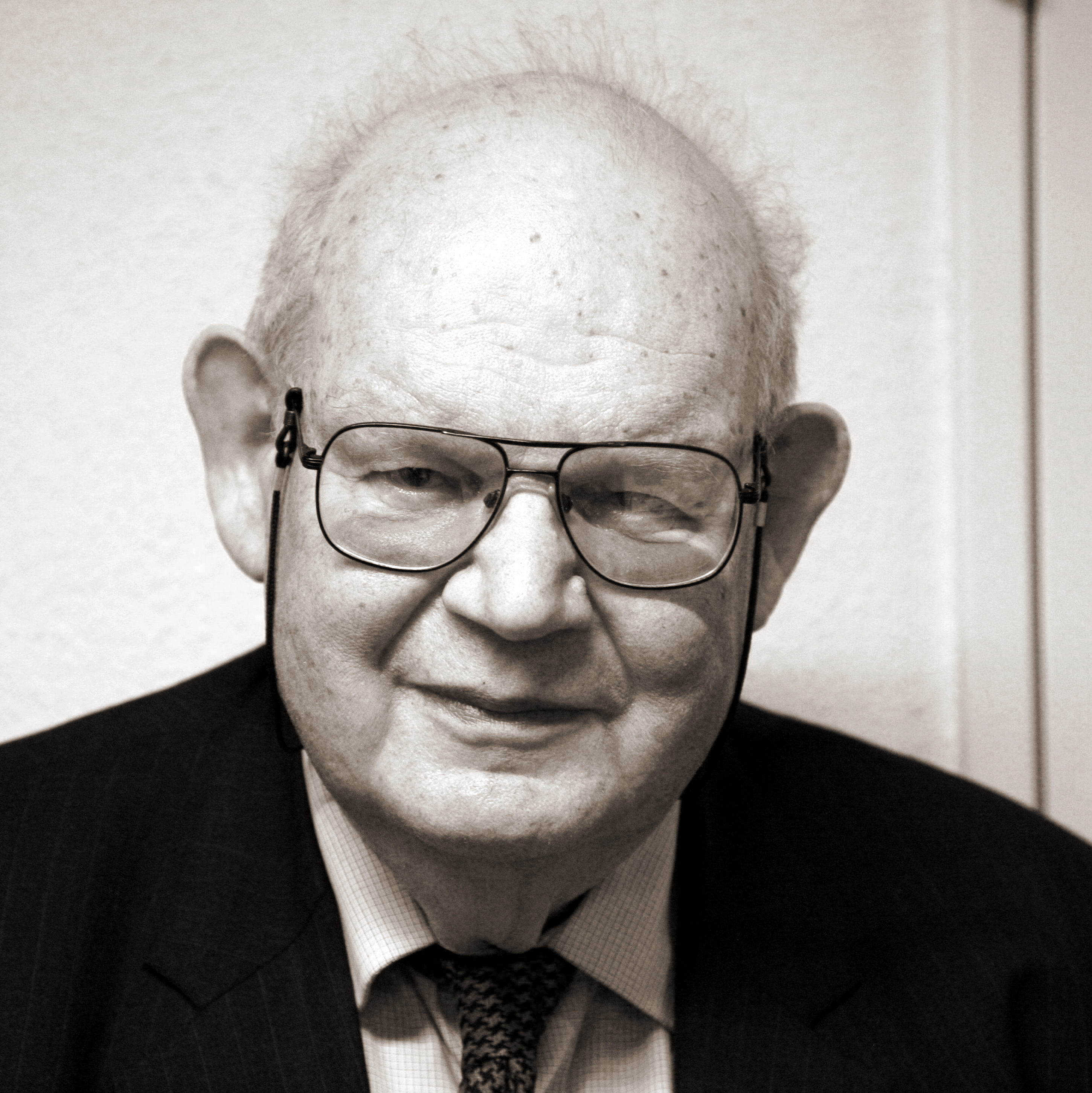
Benoit Mandelbrot, MS 1948, Engineering 1949, father of fractal geometry, namesake of the Mandelbrot set

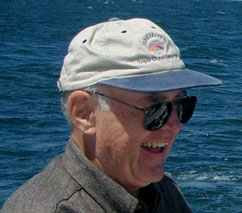
Gordon Moore, PhD 1954, co-founder of Intel, coined the observation Moore's Law

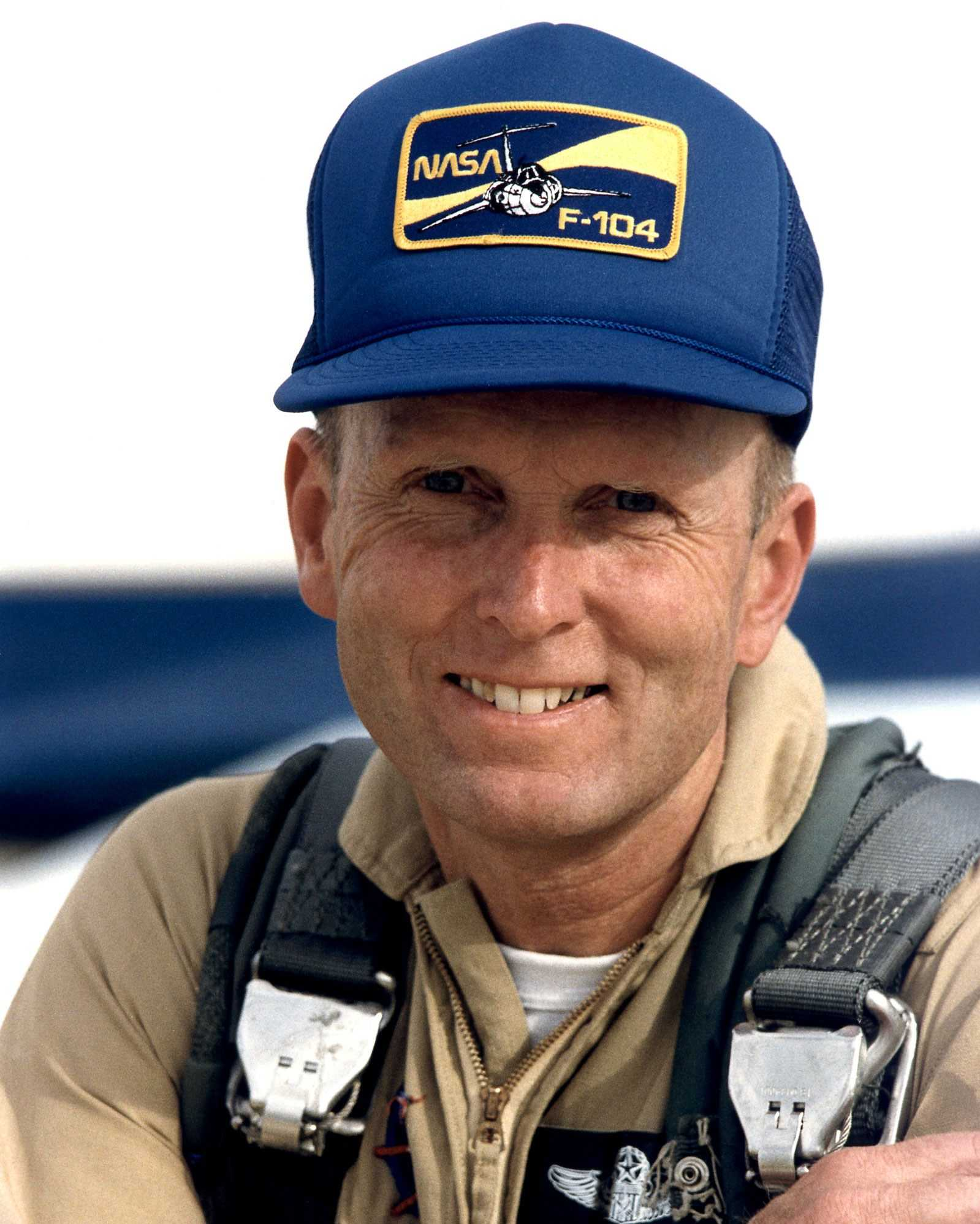
Astronaut C. Gordon Fullerton, BS 1957, MS 1958

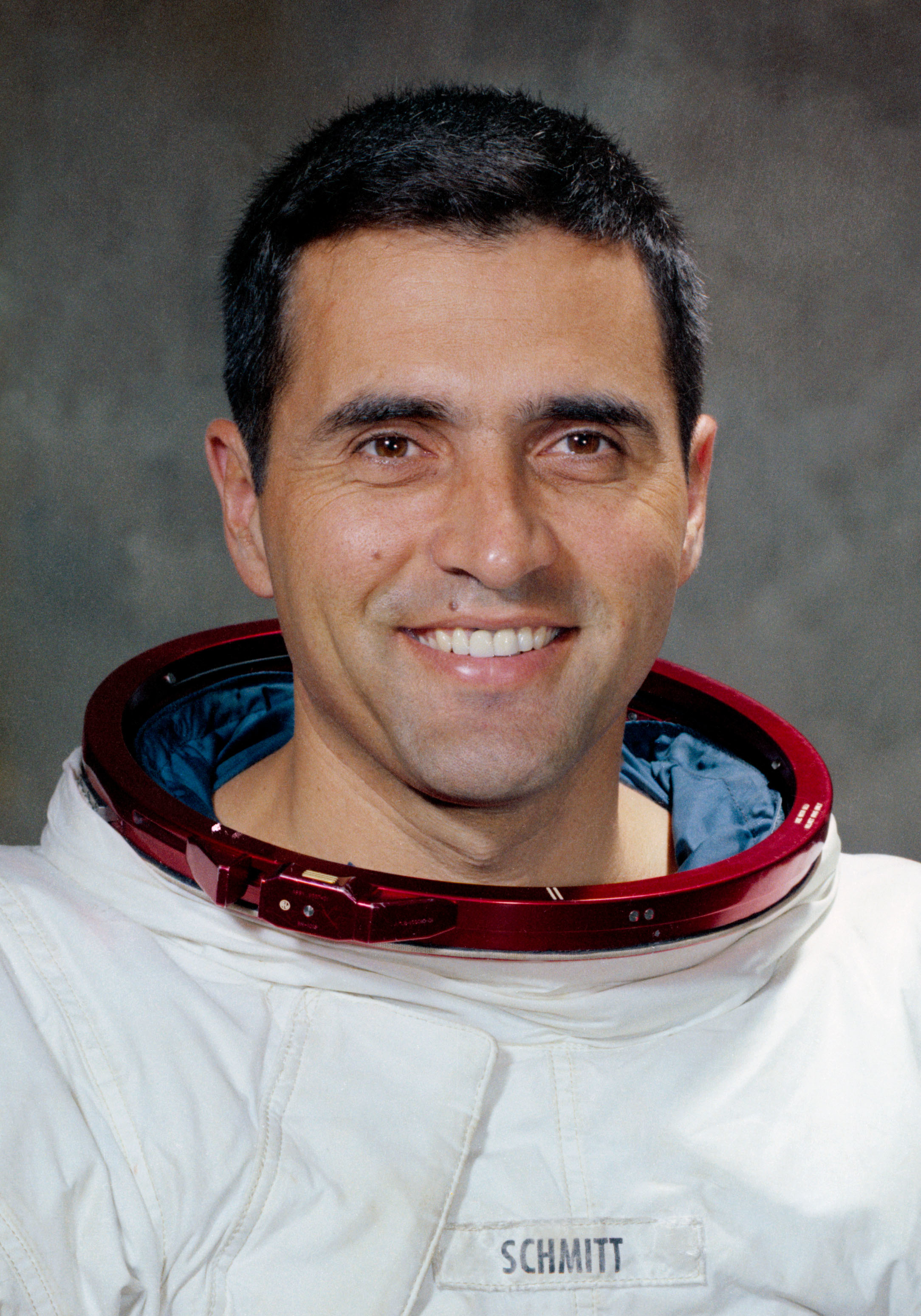
Astronaut and United States Senator Harrison Schmitt, BS 1957, the only geologist to have walked on the Moon

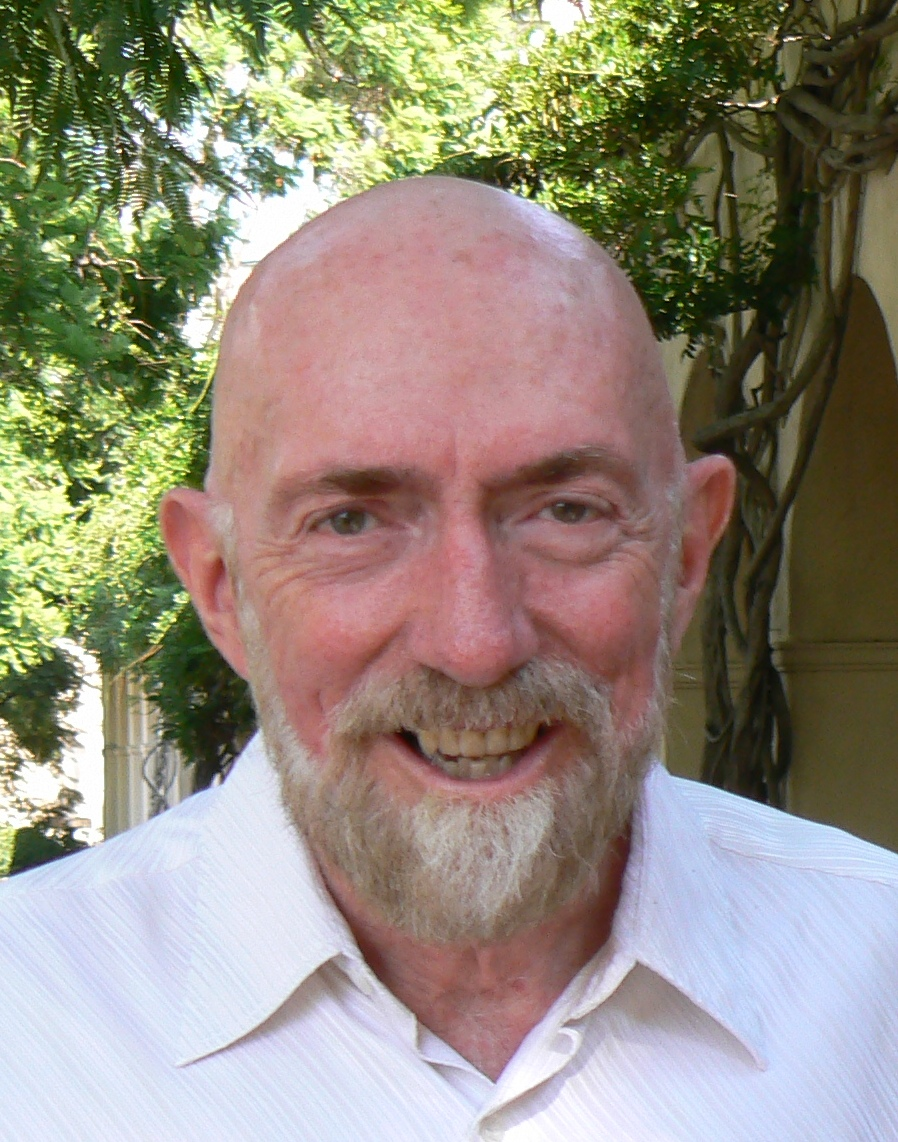
Nobel laureate Kip Thorne, BS 1962, known for his prolific contributions in gravitation physics and astrophysics and co-founding of LIGO

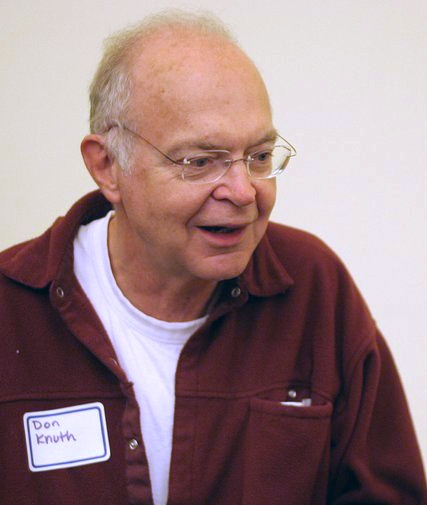
Turing Award laureate Donald Knuth, PhD 1963, "father" of the analysis of algorithms, creator of TeX typesetting system

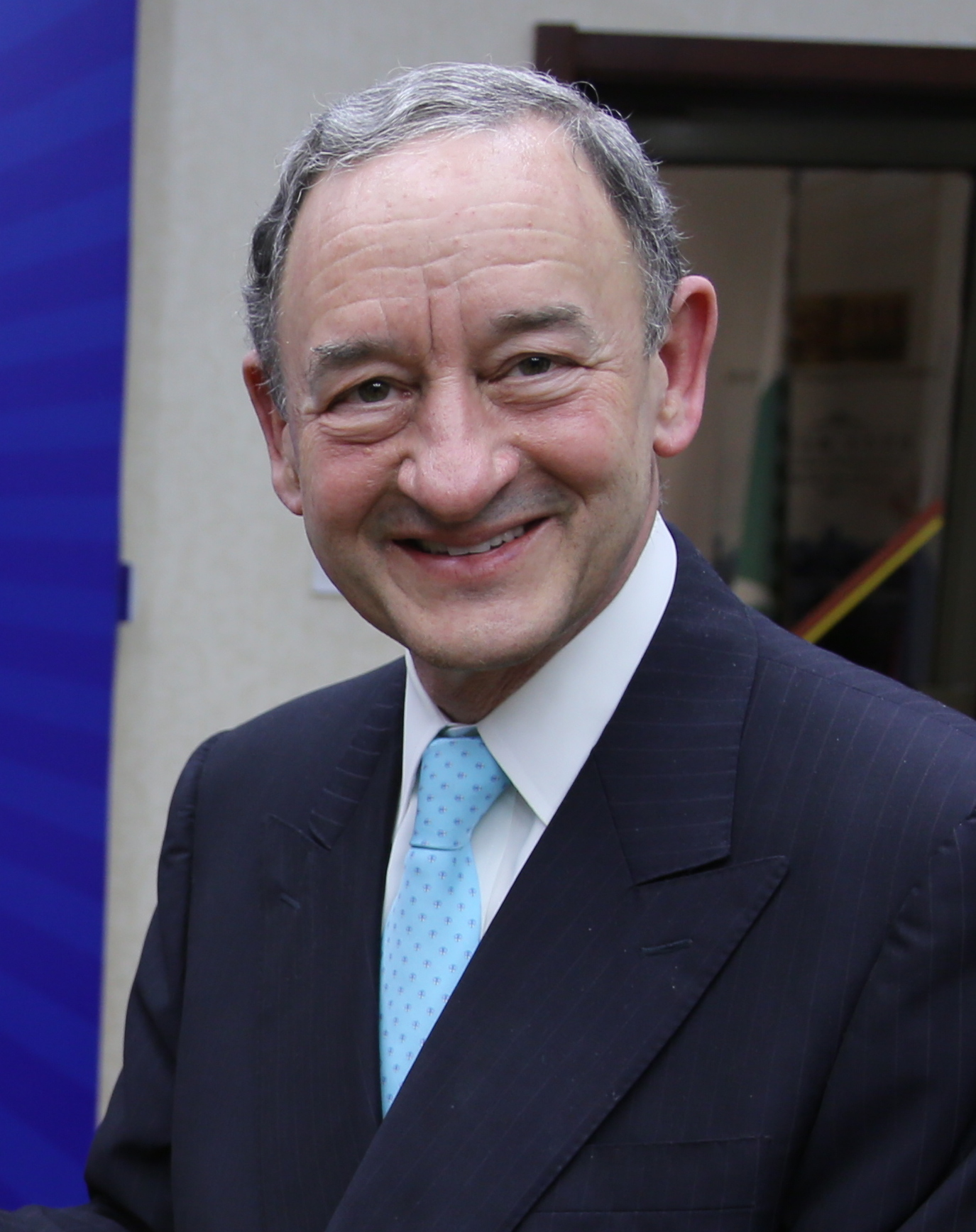
Mark S. Wrighton, PhD 1972, Chancellor of Washington University in St. Louis and President of George Washington University

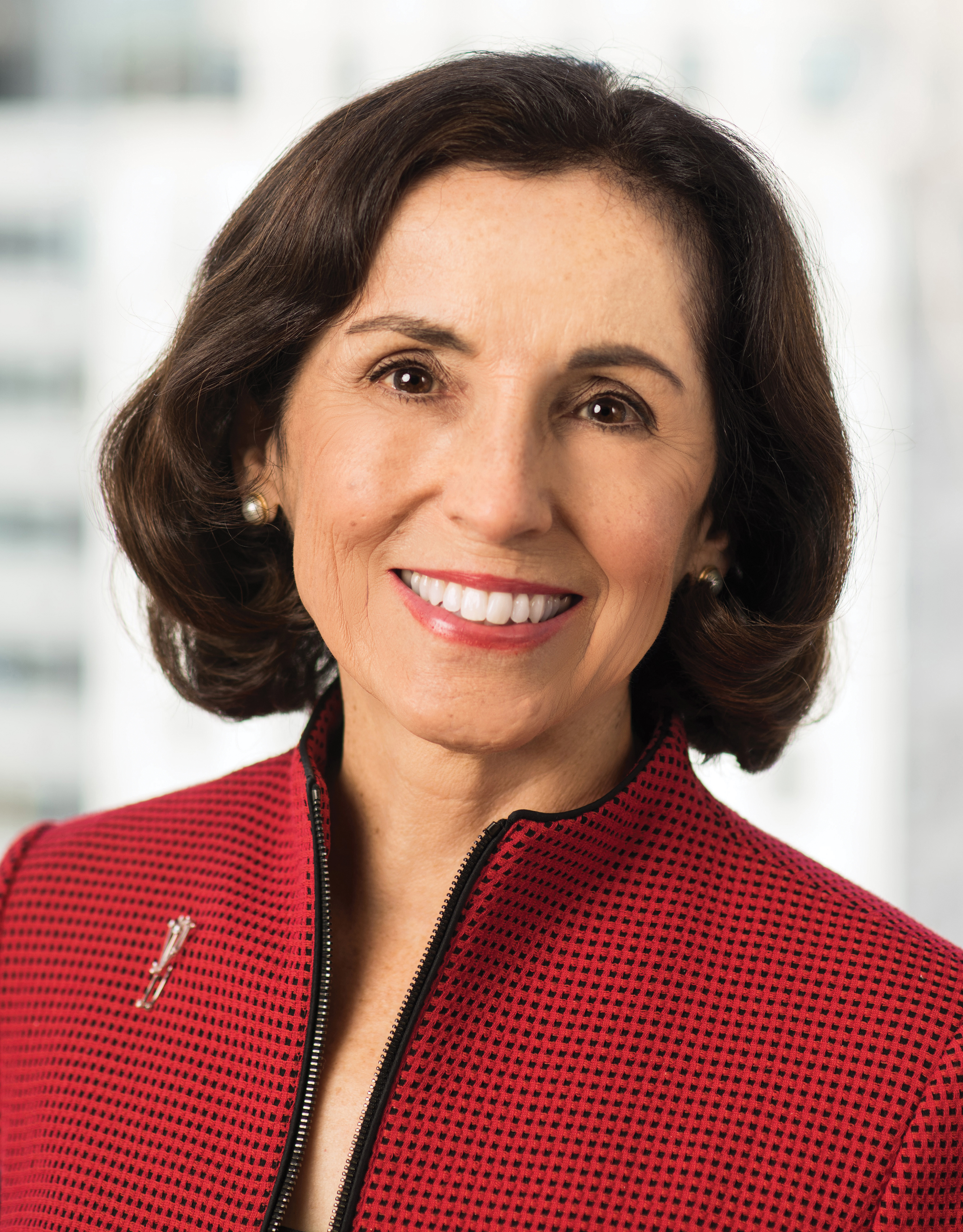
France A. Córdova, PhD 1978, Astrophysicist and 14th Director of the National Science Foundation

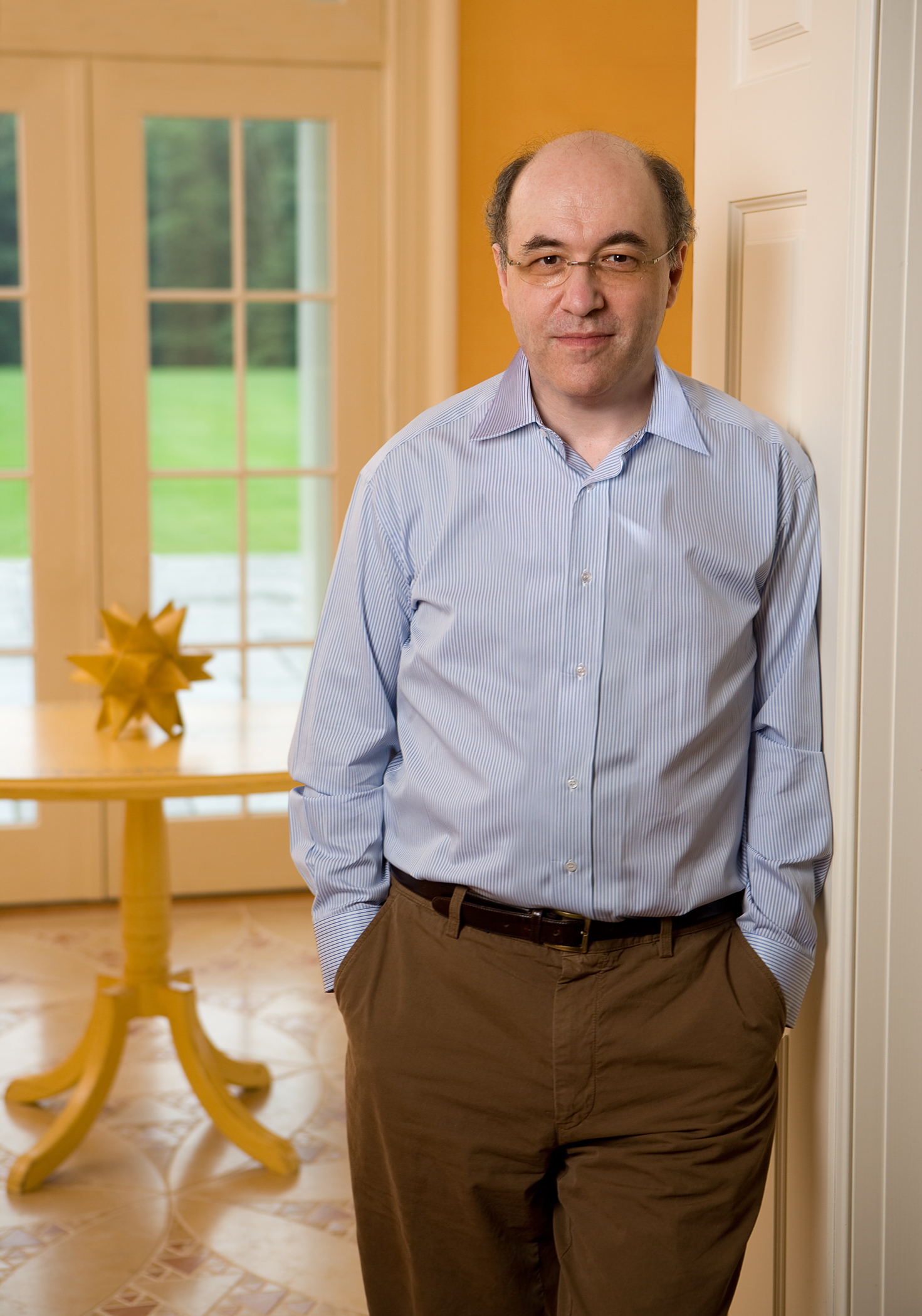
Stephen Wolfram, PhD 1979, creator of Mathematica and Wolfram Alpha; one of the first MacArthur Fellows in 1981

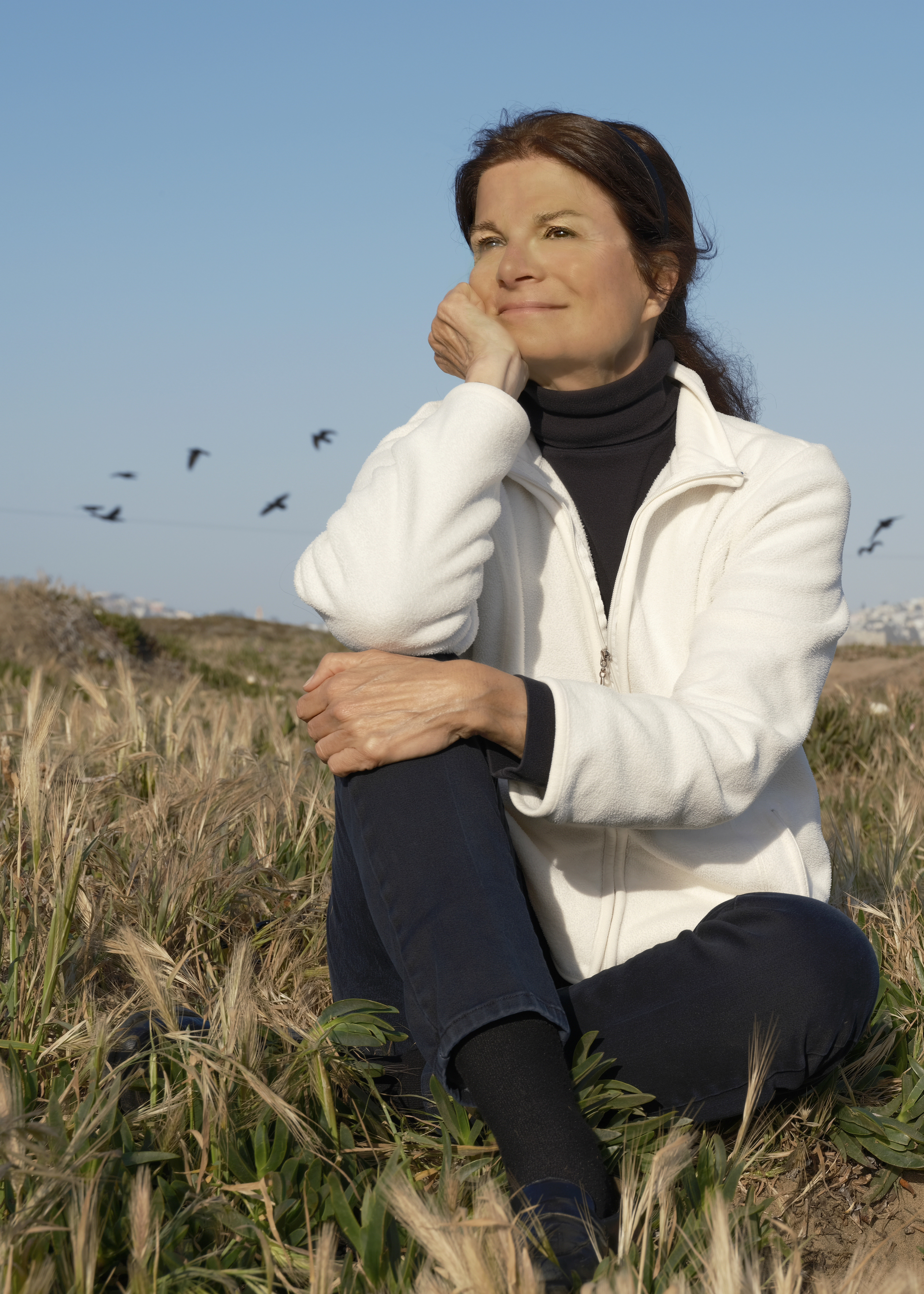
Carolyn Porco, PhD 1983, planetary scientist who led the imaging team on the Cassini mission in orbit around Saturn

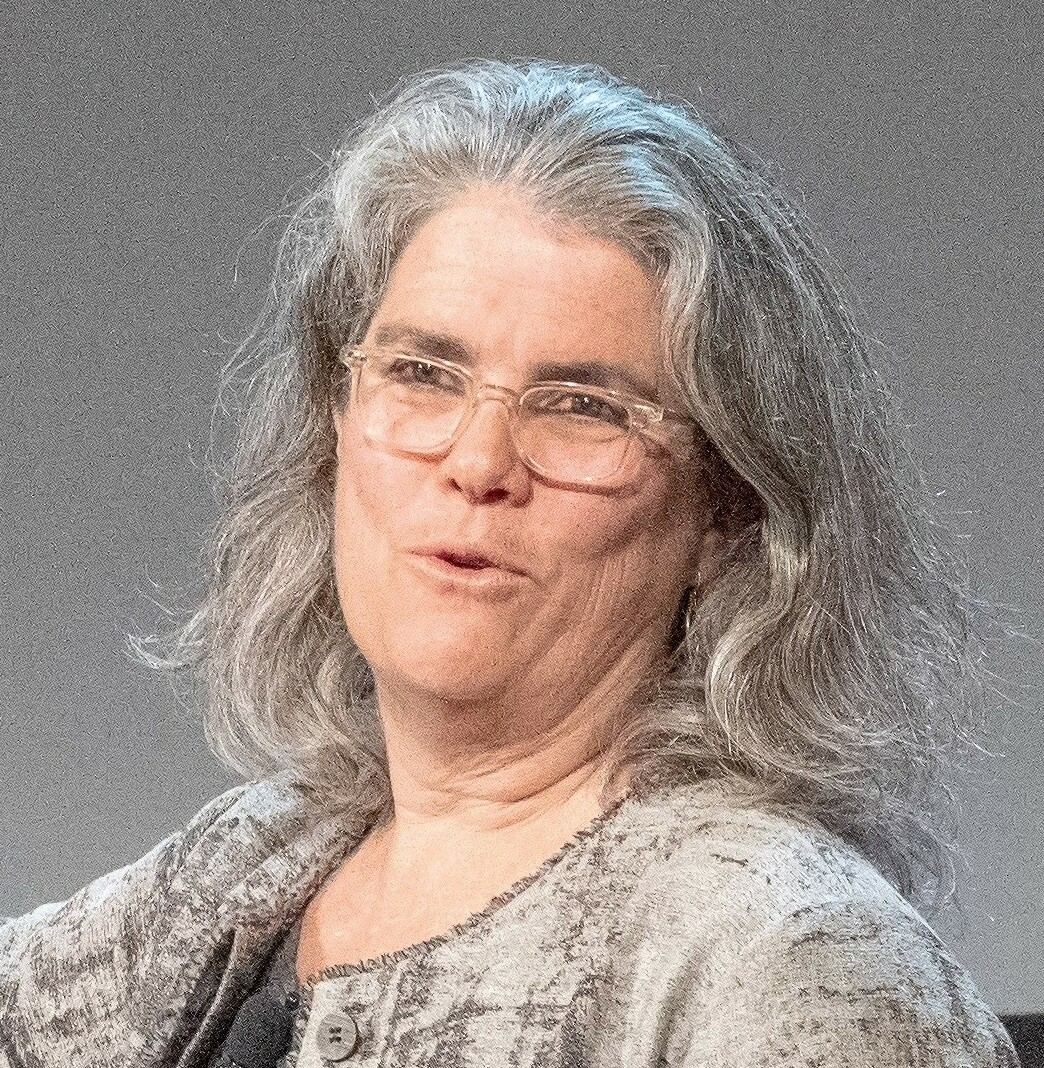
Andrea M. Ghez, PHD 1992 Nobel Prize in Physics recipient and professor at University of California, Los Angeles

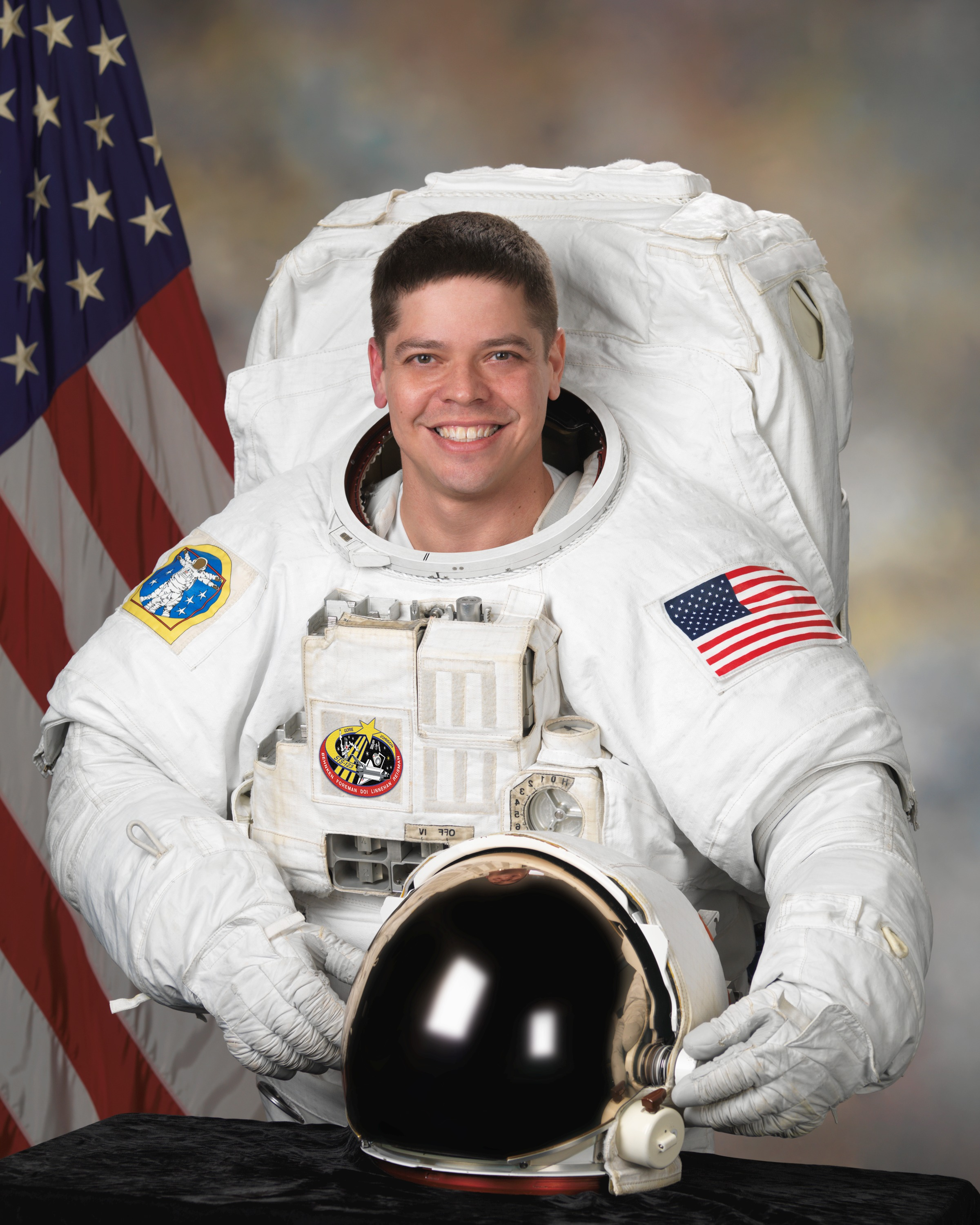
Bob Behnken, MS, 1993; PhD, 1997, Former NASA Astronaut and Chief of the Astronaut Office

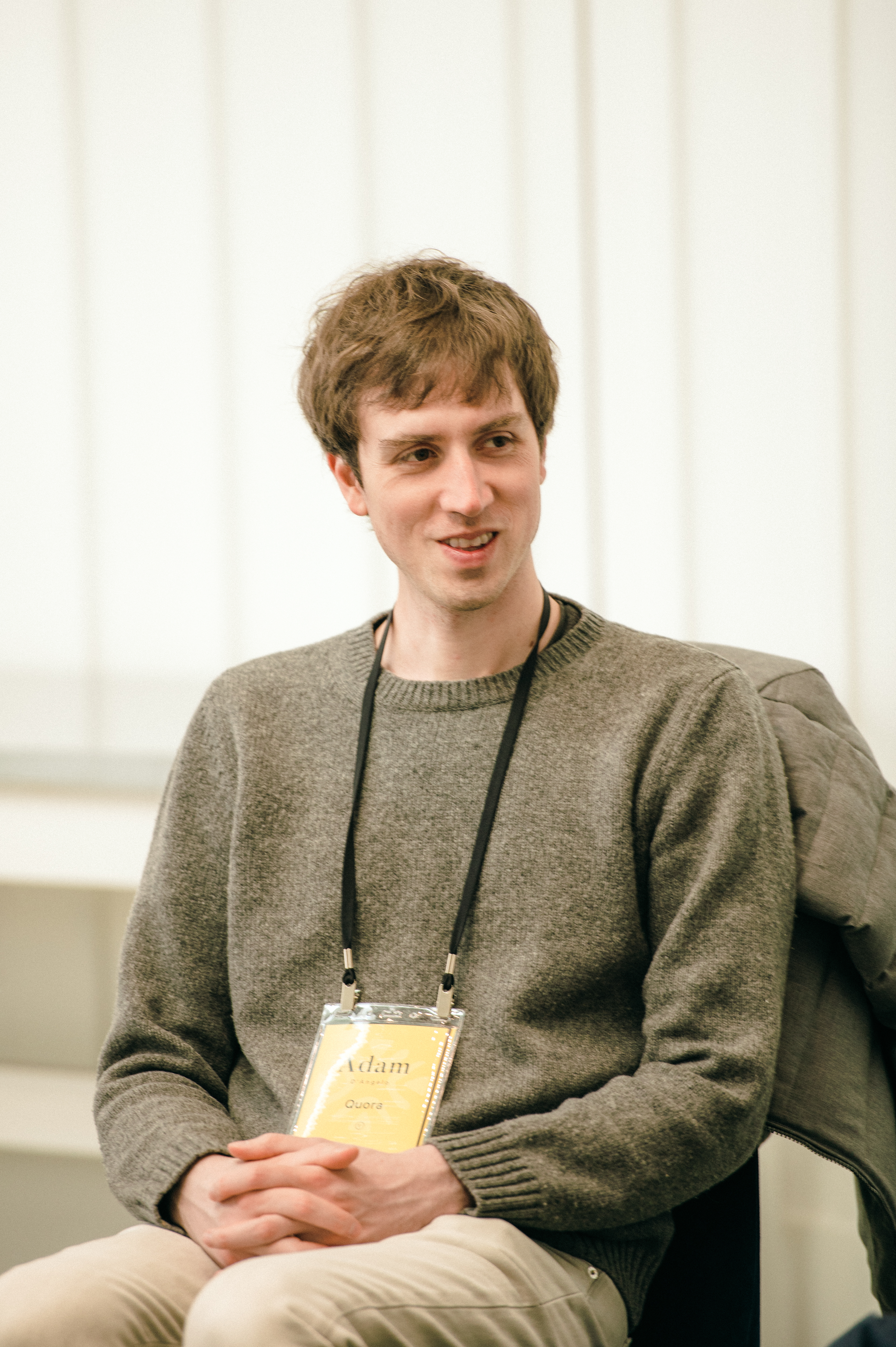
Adam D'Angelo, BS 2006, Founder of Quora

Cole Tomas Allen, who has been charged in an assassination attempt against President Donald Trump at the White House Correspondents Dinner studied mechanical engineering at the California Institute of Technology, interned at the Jet Propulsion Laboratory.

=== Faculty and staff ===
Richard Feynman was among the most well-known physicists associated with Caltech, having published the Feynman Lectures on Physics, an undergraduate physics text, and popular science texts such as Six Easy Pieces for the general audience. The promotion of physics made him a public figure of science, although his Nobel-winning work in quantum electrodynamics was already very established in the scientific community. Murray Gell-Mann, a Nobel-winning physicist, introduced a classification of hadrons and went on to postulate the existence of quarks, which is currently accepted as part of the Standard Model. Long-time Caltech President Robert Andrews Millikan was the first to calculate the charge of the electron with his well-known oil-drop experiment, while Richard Chace Tolman is remembered for his contributions to cosmology and statistical mechanics. 2004 Nobel Prize in Physics winner H. David Politzer is a current professor at Caltech, as is astrophysicist and author Kip Thorne and eminent mathematician Barry Simon. Linus Pauling pioneered quantum chemistry and molecular biology, and went on to discover the nature of the chemical bond in 1939. Seismologist Charles Richter, also an alumnus, developed the magnitude scale that bears his name, the Richter magnitude scale for measuring the power of earthquakes. One of the founders of the geochemistry department, Clair Patterson was the first to accurately determine the age of the Earth via lead:uranium ratio in meteorites. In engineering, Theodore von Kármán made many key advances in aerodynamics, notably his work on supersonic and hypersonic airflow characterization. A repeating pattern of swirling vortices is named after him, the von Kármán vortex street. Participants in von Kármán's GALCIT project included Frank Malina, who helped develop the WAC Corporal, which was the first U.S. rocket to reach the edge of space, Jack Parsons, a pioneer in the development of liquid and solid rocket fuels who designed the first castable composite-based rocket motor, and Qian Xuesen, who was dubbed the "Father of Chinese Rocketry". More recently, Michael Brown, a professor of planetary astronomy, discovered many trans-Neptunian objects, most notably the dwarf planet Eris, which prompted the International Astronomical Union to redefine the term "planet".

David Baltimore, the Robert A. Millikan Professor of Biology, and Alice Huang, Senior Faculty Associate in Biology, served as the presidents of AAAS from 2007 to 2008 and 2010 to 2011, respectively.

33% of the faculty are members of the National Academy of Sciences or Engineering and/or fellows of the American Academy of Arts and Sciences. This is the highest percentage of any faculty in the country with the exception of the graduate institution Rockefeller University.

The average salary for assistant professors at Caltech in 2012 was $111,300, associate professors $121,300, and full professors $172,800. Caltech faculty are active in applied physics, astronomy and astrophysics, biology, biochemistry, biological engineering, chemical engineering, computer science, geology, mechanical engineering, and physics.

=== Presidents ===
The following persons have led Caltech, known as Throop before 1921. The numbering is made to be consistent with Caltech's announcement: "Ray Jayawardhana Appointed Caltech's Tenth President".

No.	Image	Name	Term start	Term end	Field	Refs.
–		Charles Henry Keyes	1892	1896 (Note: Resigned to join the faculty of the Wilmerding School of Industrial Arts.)	Education	
–		Walter Alison Edwards	1897	June 30, 1907 (Note: Resigned to become head of classics department at Los Angeles High School.)	Classics	
acting		Arthur Henry Chamberlain	July 1, 1907	September 30, 1908	Education	
1		James A. B. Scherer	October 1, 1908	September 12, 1920 (Note: Although Scherer official tendered his resignation on September 12, 1920, Scherer had been on a leave of absence for health reasons since April 1, 1920.)	Theology	
Faculty administrative committee (1920–1921)
2		Robert A. Millikan	October 1921	August 31, 1945	Physics	
3		Lee A. DuBridge	September 1, 1946	January 15, 1969 (Note: Resigned to become President Richard Nixon's scientific advisor.)	Physics	
acting		Robert Bacher	January 16, 1969	February 16, 1969	Physics	
4		Harold Brown	February 17, 1969	January 20, 1977 (Note: Brown resigned after being nominated and confirmed as the US secretary of defense during the first afternoon of the Carter Administration.)	Physics	
acting		Robert F. Christy	January 21, 1977	June 30, 1978	Astrophysics	
5		Marvin L. Goldberger	July 1, 1978	August 31, 1987 (Note: Resigned to head the Institute of Advanced Study at Princeton.)	Physics	
6		Thomas E. Everhart	September 1, 1987	October 14, 1997	Physics	
7		David Baltimore	October 15, 1997	August 31, 2006	Molecular biology	
8		Jean-Lou Chameau	September 1, 2006	June 30, 2013	Civil engineering	
Interim		Edward M. Stolper	July 1, 2013	June 30, 2014	Geology	
9		Thomas F. Rosenbaum	July 1, 2014	June 30, 2026	Physics	
10		Ray Jayawardhana	July 1, 2026	present	Astrophysics	

Table notes:

== Caltech startups ==
Over the years Caltech has actively promoted the commercialization of technologies developed within its walls. Through its Office of Technology Transfer & Corporate Partnerships, scientific breakthroughs have led to the transfer of numerous technologies in a wide variety of scientific-related fields such as photovoltaic, radio-frequency identification (RFID), semiconductors, hyperspectral imaging, electronic devices, protein design, solid state amplifiers and many more. Companies such as Quora, Contour Energy Systems, Impinj, Fulcrum Microsystems, Nanosys, Inc., Photon etc., Xencor, and Wavestream Wireless have emerged from Caltech.

== In media and popular culture ==
Caltech has appeared in many works of popular culture, both as itself and in disguised form. On television, it played a prominent role and was the workplace of all four male lead characters and one female lead character in the sitcom The Big Bang Theory and was seen in the closing moments of the final episode of the prequel series Young Sheldon. Caltech is also the inspiration, and frequent film location, for the California Institute of Science in Numb3rs. On film, the Pacific Tech of The War of the Worlds and Real Genius is based on Caltech. In nonfiction, two 2007 documentaries examine aspects of Caltech: Curious, its researchers, and Quantum Hoops, its men's basketball team.

Caltech is also prominently featured in many comics and television series by Marvel Entertainment. In Marvel Comics, the university serves as the alma mater of Hulk, Mister Fantastic, Bill Foster (Black Goliath), and Madman. In the Marvel Cinematic Universe, Bruno Carrelli (Kamala Khan's best friend and love interest) attends Caltech in the miniseries Ms. Marvel.

Given its Los Angeles-area location, the grounds of the Institute are often host to short scenes in movies and television. The Athenaeum dining club appears in the Beverly Hills Cop series, The X-Files, True Romance, and The West Wing.

== See also ==
- Engineering education
- US-China University Presidents Roundtable
