= Edwards (surname) =

Origin
- Origin: English
- Meaning: Son of Edward

Edwards is a patronymic surname of English origin, meaning "son of Edward". Edwards is the 14th most common surname in Wales and 21st most common in England. Within the United States, it was ranked as the 49th-most common surname as surveyed in 1990, falling to 51st in 2014.

It may refer to:

== People ==
=== A ===
- Aaron Edwards (born 1984), Australian rules footballer
- Aaron Edwards (football) (born 1969), Gibraltarian footballer
- Ada Mae Edwards (1911–2004), Saint Kitts and Nevis politician
- Al Edwards (American football) (born 1967), American football wide receiver
- Al Edwards (politician) (1937–2020), American politician
- Alan Edwards (disambiguation)
- Albert Edwards (footballer) (flourished 1910s, died 1918), English footballer
- Albert Gallatin Edwards (1812–1892), American businessman and Assistant Secretary of the U.S. Treasury
- Turk Edwards (Albert Glen Edwards, 1907–1973), American football tackle and coach
- Alexander Edwards (disambiguation)
- Allen Edwards (basketball) (born 1975), American basketball player and coach
- Allen Edwards (cricketer) (1868–1961), Australian cricketer
- Aaliyah Edwards (born 2002), Canadian women's basketball player
- A. M. Edwards (1905–1987), American lawyer and statesman who served as Secretary of Guam
- Allyn Edwards (1914 or 1915–1968), American announcer and host on radio and television
- Amanda Edwards (born 1982), American politician
- Amelia Edwards (1831–1892), English novelist, journalist, traveller and Egyptologist
- Amelia Edwards (publisher), co-founder of Walker Books
- Amy Edwards, Australian actor and singer
- Andy Edwards (disambiguation)
- Andrew Edwards (cricketer) (born 1978), English cricketer
- Andrew David Edwards (born 1958), American serial killer
- Anthony Edwards (disambiguation)
- Arthur Edwards (disambiguation)
- Archie Edwards (1918–1998), American Piedmont blues guitarist
- Ashton Edwards (born 2002 or 2003), American ballet dancer
- Astra Edwards (born 1981), Trinidadian table tennis player
- Austin Edwards (born 1997), American football player
- Austin Burton Edwards (1909–1960), Australian mineralogist and petrologist

=== B ===
- Becca Edwards, Ex on the Beach series 6 participant
- Becky Edwards (Utah politician), American politician
- Becky Edwards (Montana politician), American politician
- Becky Edwards (soccer) (born 1988), American soccer player
- Bela Bates Edwards (1802–1852), American theologian
- Ben or Benjamin Edwards (disambiguation)
- Bernard Edwards (American football) (born 1969), American football player
- Bert Edwards (disambiguation)
- Billy Edwards Jr. (born 2003), American football player
- Blake Edwards (1922–2010), American film director, screenwriter and producer
- Blake Edwards (cricketer) (born 1999), Australian cricketer
- Bob Edwards (disambiguation)
- Bobby Edwards (1926–2012), American country musician
- Bobby Edwards (soccer) (born 1995), American soccer player
- Braylon Edwards (born 1983), American football wide receiver
- Brian Edwards (broadcaster) (born 1937), Irish-born New Zealand media personality and author
- Brian Edwards (soccer) (born 1984), American soccer player
- Bryan Edwards (disambiguation)

=== C ===
- Caitlyn Edwards (born 1996), Australian rules footballer
- Carl Edwards (born 1979), American racing driver
- Carl Johannes Edwards (1914–1985), British stained glass artist
- Carl Edwards (equestrian) (born 1963), British equestrian
- Carl Edwards Jr. (born 1991), American baseball player
- Carl M. Edwards (born 1943), American-Ukrainian politician
- Carlos Edwards (born 1978), Trinidadian former footballer
- Carsen Edwards (born 1998), American basketball player
- Cedric Edwards (1899–1918), British military aviator
- Charles Edwards (journalist) (1906–1983), Canadian journalist and news agency executive
- Charlie Edwards (boxer) (born 1993), British boxer
- Charlie Edwards (Australian footballer) (born 2005), Australian rules footballer
- Charlotte Edwards (born 1979), English cricketer
- Clancy Edwards (born 1955), American sprinter
- Clarence Edwards (blues musician) (1933–1993), American blues musician
- Chet Edwards (born 1951), American politician
- Clement Edwards (1869–1938), Welsh lawyer, journalist, activist and politician
- Clement Alexander Edwards (1812–1882), British soldier
- Clarence Ransom Edwards (1860–1931), American military general
- Cliff Edwards (1895–1971), American musician and actor
- Cliff Edwards (footballer) (1921–1989), English footballer
- Colin Edwards (born 1974), American motorcycle racer
- Colin Edwards (footballer) (1991–2013), Guyanese footballer
- Colin Edwards (journalist) (1924–1994), British journalist and documentarian
- Craig Edwards (Australian footballer) (born 1961), Australian rules footballer
- Craig Edwards (English footballer) (born 1982), English association footballer
- Craig Edwards (tennis) (born 1955), American professional tennis player
- Cyrus Edwards (1793–1877), American politician and lawyer

=== D ===
- Daijun Edwards (born 2001), American football player
- Daniel Edwards (born 1965), American contemporary artist
- Dan Edwards (1926–2001), American football player
- Dan Edwards (rugby union) (born 2003), Welsh rugby player
- Danny Edwards (born 1951), American professional golfer
- David Edwards (disambiguation), multiple people
- Derek Edwards (born 1958), Canadian comedian
- Derek Edwards (rugby league) (flourished 1960s–1970s, died 2020), English rugby league footballer
- Diane Edwards, birth name of Diane Modahl (born 1966), English middle-distance runner
- Dianne Edwards (born 1942), Welsh paleobotanist
- Doc Edwards (1936–2018), American baseball player, coach, and manager
- Don Edwards (disambiguation)
- Donald E. Edwards (1937–2018), American state military officer
- Donna Edwards (born 1958), American politician
- Donna Edwards (actress) (born 1963), Welsh actress
- Donnie Edwards (born 1973), American football linebacker
- Donovan Edwards (born 2003), American football player
- Doug Edwards (basketball) (born 1971), American professional basketball player
- Doug Edwards (musician) (1946–2016), Canadian musician
- Douglas Edwards (1917–1990), American television news anchor
- Duncan Edwards (1936–1958), English association footballer

=== E ===
- Ed Edwards, British corporate executive and film director
- Eddie Edwards (disambiguation)
- Edward Edwards (disambiguation)
- Edwin Edwards (1927–2021), American politician, including Governor of Louisiana
- Edwin Edwards (disambiguation)
- Elodie Edwards-Grossi, French historian and sociologist
- Eric Edwards (disambiguation)
- Erin Edwards, American politician

=== F ===
- Federico Edwards (1931–2016), Argentine footballer
- Felicia Edwards (born 1993), American sprinter
- Fidel Edwards (born 1982), Barbadian cricketer
- Frank Edwards (disambiguation)
- Fred Edwards (footballer) (1891–1972), Australian rules footballer
- Frederick Edwards (disambiguation)

=== G ===
- Gareth Edwards (disambiguation)
- Gary Edwards (ice hockey) (born 1947), Canadian ice hockey player
- Gary Edwards (photographer) (born 1967), British photographer
- Gary Edwards (rugby league) (born 1970), Australian rugby league player
- Gaston Alonzo Edwards (1875–1943) American architect and educator
- Geoff Edwards (1931–2014), American actor and game show host
- Geoffrey Edwards (Canadian scientist), Canadian geomatics scientist
- Geoffrey Edwards (political scientist) (born 1945), British academic
- Geoff Edwards (1931–2014), American actor and game show host
- Geoffrey Edwards (Canadian scientist), Canadian geomatics scientist
- Geoffrey Edwards (political scientist) (born 1945), British academic
- George Edwards (disambiguation)
- Glen Edwards (pilot), American test pilot, namesake of Edwards Air Force Base
- Glynn Edwards (1931–2018), British actor
- Graham Edwards (disambiguation)
- Gus Edwards (vaudevillian) (1878–1945), American songwriter and vaudevillian
- Harold Edwards (RCAF officer) (1892–1952), Royal Canadian Air Force air marshal, also known as Gus Edwards
- Gus Edwards (American football) (born 1995), American football running back

=== H ===
- Harold Edwards (disambiguation)
- Harry Stillwell Edwards (1855–1938), American journalist, novelist, and poet
- Helen Edwards (artist) (1882–1963), British artist
- Henrietta Edwards (1849–1931), Canadian feminist and author
- Henri Milne-Edwards (1800–1885), French naturalist, originally surnamed Edwards
- Henry Sutherland Edwards (1828–1906), English journalist and author
- Ringer Edwards (Herbert James Edwards, 1913–2000), Australian soldier
- Herbert Edwards (cricketer, born 1884) (Herbert Ivor Powell Edwards, 1884–1946), English cricketer
- Bert Edwards (cricketer) (Herbert Charles Edwards, 1913–2002), English cricketer
- Herm Edwards, American football player and coach
- Hugh Edwards (disambiguation)
- Sir Hughie Edwards, RAF Air Commodore, Governor of Western Australia
- Humphrey Edwards (1582–1658), English commissioner, courtier, and member of Parliament
- Huw Edwards (disambiguation)

=== I ===
- India Edwards (died 1990), Vice Chairwoman of the Democratic National Committee
- Iwan Edwards (1937–2022), Canadian choral conductor

=== J ===
- J. Gordon Edwards (director) (1867–1925), Canadian film director
- J. Gordon Edwards (entomologist) (1919–2004), American entomologist, mountain climber, author, and park ranger
- Jack Edwards (disambiguation), multiple people
- Jackie Edwards (disambiguation), multiple people
- Jamal Edwards (1990–2022), British entrepreneur
- James Edwards (disambiguation), multiple people
- Jango Edwards (1950–2023), American clown and entertainer
- Jason Edwards (disambiguation), multiple people
- Jay Edwards (disambiguation), multiple people
- Jeanne Edwards (1928–2011), American politician
- Jimmy Edwards (1920–1988), English comedian
- John Edwards (disambiguation), multiple people
- Jonathan Edwards (disambiguation), multiple people
- Joyce Edwards (born 2006), American basketball player
- Junior D. Edwards (1926–1951), American Medal of Honor recipient
- Justin Edwards (disambiguation)

=== K ===
- Kaleb Edwards (born 2007), American football player
- Kathryn Edwards (born 1964), American actress
- Kenny Edwards (rugby league) (born 1989), New Zealand rugby league player
- Kirk Edwards (born 1983), Barbadian cricketer
- KJ Edwards (born 2007), American football player
- Kyle Edwards (disambiguation)
- Kyler Edwards (born 1999), American basketball player

=== L ===
- Laila Edwards (born 2004), American ice hockey player
- LaVell Edwards (1930–2016), American football coach
- Lee Edwards (1932–2024), American academic, historian, and author
- Lee Edwards (cricketer) (born 1979), New Zealand cricketer
- Leon Edwards (born 1991), English mixed martial arts fighter
- LeRoy Edwards (1914–1971), American basketball player
- Lewis Edwards (1809–1887), Welsh educator
- Lewis A. Edwards (1811–1879), New York politician
- Louis Edwards (businessman) (1914–1980), Chairman of Manchester United
- Louis F. Edwards (1892–1939), American politician
- Lucy Edwards, British disability activist and educator

=== M ===
- Mack Ray Edwards (1918–1971), American criminal
- Maria Edwards (born 2003), English footballer
- Mark Edwards (disambiguation)
- Marshall Edwards (1952–2025), American baseball player
- Marshall Edwards (American football) (1915–2000), American football player
- Martin Edwards (born 1945), English football chairman
- Martin Edwards (author) (born 1955), English writer
- Martin Park Edwards (born 2008), Canadian singer, rapper and leader of South Korean boy band Cortis
- Mary Edwards (disambiguation)
- Mason Edwards (born 2005), American baseball player
- Melvin Edwards (1937–2026), American sculptor
- Michael Edwards (disambiguation), also Mike Edwards
- Mihi Edwards (1918–2008), New Zealand writer, social worker, teacher and Maori leader
- Monroe Edwards (1808–1847), American forger and slave trader
- Myrtle Edwards (sportswoman) (1921–2010), Australian cricketer and softball player

=== N ===
- Natalie Edwards (born 1978), former senior official with the United States Treasury
- Nelson "Jack" Edwards (1917–1974), first African-American to hold a seat on the UAW's International Executive Board
- Ness Edwards (1897–1968), Welsh miner, trade unionist and politician
- Ninian Edwards (1775–1833), American politician
- Ninian Wirt Edwards (1809–1899), American politician
- Norman Edwards (1962–2015), Jamaican sprinter

=== O ===
- Oliver Edwards (1835–1904), American inventor and soldier

=== P ===
- Patrick Edwards (born 1988), American football player
- Paul Edwards (disambiguation), multiple people
- Paulette Edwards (born 1964), English radio presenter
- Pauline Edwards (born 1949), British Olympic archer
- Perrie Edwards (born 1993), English singer
- Philip Edwards (disambiguation) (or Phil)
- Pierpont Edwards (1750–1826), American lawyer

=== R ===
- R. T. Edwards, pseudonym of Ron Goulart, writer
- Ralph Edwards (disambiguation)
- Ray Edwards (disambiguation), multiple people
- Ray K. Edwards (1923–1942), United States Marine who received the Silver Star
- Richard Edwards (disambiguation), multiple people
- Richey Edwards (1967–1995 (presumed)), Welsh musician (Manic Street Preachers)
- Richie Edwards (born 1974), English musician
- Richie Edwards (basketball) (born 1990), American-New Zealand former basketball player
- Richie Edwards (darts player) (born 1989), Welsh former professional darts player
- Rhys Edwards (1991–2016), Welsh rugby union coach
- Rob or Robert Edwards (disambiguation)
- Roger Edwards (disambiguation)
- Ronnie Claire Edwards (1933–2016), American actress
- Ronnie Edwards (politician) (1952–2016), American politician
- Roy Edwards (ice hockey) (1937–1999), Canadian ice hockey player
- Roy Edwards (politician) (1954–2020), American politician
- Ryan Edwards (disambiguation), multiple people

=== S ===
- Sally Edwards (born 1947), American triathlete
- Sam Edwards (disambiguation), also Samuel
- Sara Edwards (born 1962), Welsh television presenter
- Sara Edwards (American television host)
- Sarah Edwards (disambiguation)
- Sebastián Edwards (born 1953) Chilean economist, writer, speaker, UCLA professor, consultant
- Sean Edwards (disambiguation), multiple people
- Shane Edwards (born 1988), Australian rules football player
- Shane Edwards (basketball) (born 1987), American basketball player
- Shania Twain (née Eilleen Regina Edwards, born 1965), Canadian singer
- Shaun Edwards (born 1966), English rugby league player and rugby union coach
- Stacy Edwards (born 1965), American actress
- Stan Edwards (born 1960), American football player
- Stan Edwards (footballer born 1942) (1942–2014), English footballer
- Stan Edwards (footballer born 1926) (1926–1989), English footballer
- Stearne Tighe Edwards (1893–1918), Canadian flying ace
- Steven, Stephen or Steve Edwards (disambiguation)
- Steve Edwards (singer) (born 1980), English singer
- Sunny Edwards (born 1996), British boxer

=== T ===
- "Big Boy" Teddy Edwards, American blues musician
- Thyra J. Edwards (1857–1953), African-American educator, journalist, labor activist, and social worker
- Tia Edwards (born 1995), American sitting volleyball player
- T. J. Edwards (born 1996), American football player
- Tommy Edwards (1922–1969), American singer-songwriter
- Tony Edwards (cartoonist) (born 1944), Australian comic book artist and illustrator
- Torri Edwards (born 1977), American sprinter
- Trevor Edwards (1937–2024), Welsh footballer
- Trevor Edwards (bishop) (born 1950), Australian retired Anglican bishop
- Tru Edwards (born 2001), American football player
- Tudor Edwards (1890–1946), Welsh thoracic surgeon
- Todd Edwards (born 1972), American garage house record producer, DJ, and singer

=== V ===
- Victoria Edwards (born 1948), New Zealand artist, printmaker and art educator
- Vivian Edwards (1896–1949), American actress in silent films

=== W ===
- Walter Edwards (disambiguation)
- Wilfred Edwards (disambiguation)
- Willarda V. Edwards, African-American physician
- William Edwards (disambiguation)
- Wynn Edwards (1842–1900), American politician

=== X ===
- Xavier Edwards (born 1999), American baseball player

=== Y ===
- Yvonne Edwards Tucker (born 1941), maiden name Edwards, American potter
- Yvvette Edwards, British novelist of Caribbean heritage

=== Z ===
- Zena Edwards (born 1960s), British poet of Caribbean heritage

=== Unknown given name ===
- Edwards (baseball), baseball player who played in one Major League Baseball game in 1875

== Fictional characters ==
- Ben Edwards (Baywatch), on the TV series Baywatch from 1991 to 1994
- Eric Edwards (Neighbours), on the Australian soap opera Neighbours

== See also ==
- General Edwards (disambiguation)
- Judge Edwards (disambiguation)
- Justice Edwards (disambiguation)
- Senator Edwards (disambiguation)
- Edwards family, of Chile
- Matilda Betham-Edwards (1836–1919), English novelist and writer
- Alphonse Milne-Edwards (1835–1900), French zoologist, son of Henri Milne-Edwards (see above)
- V. C. Wynne-Edwards (1906–1997), British zoologist
- Edward
- Edwardes
