= Arthur Edwards =

Arthur Edwards may refer to:

- Arthur Edwards (antiquary) (died 1743), English army officer and antiquary
- Arthur Edwards (architect) (1863–1927), English architect
- Arthur Edwards (basketball) (born 1992) American basketball player
- Arthur Edwards (cleric) (1834–1901), American clergyman and editor
- Arthur Edwards (cricketer), English cricketer and British Army officer
- Arthur Edwards (footballer, born 1915) (1915–2002), Australian rules footballer
- Arthur Edwards (footballer, born 1934) (1934–2006), Australian rules footballer
- Arthur Edwards (photographer) (born 1940), British photographer
- Arthur Edwards (sailor) (flourished 1560s), British sailor
- Arthur Edwards (priest), Anglican priest
- Arthur Edwards (rugby league)
- Arthur Edwards (rugby union)
- Arthur Charles Edwards (1867–1940), English organist and composer
- Arthur Noel Edwards (1883–1915), English polo player

== See also ==
- Tudor Edwards (1890–1946, Arthur Tudor Edwards), Welsh thoracic surgeon
- Edwards (surname)
