= Edward Edwards =

Edward Edwards may refer to:

- Edward Edwards (actor) (living), American television and film actor
- Edward Edwards (librarian) (1812–1886), British librarian, library historian, and biographer
- Edward Edwards (musician) (1816–1897), Welsh musician and composer
- Edward Edwards (painter) (1738–1806), English painter
- Edward Edwards (priest, died 1783) (c. 1726–1783), Welsh scholar and clergyman
- Edward Edwards (archdeacon of Brecon), Welsh Anglican priest, archdeacon of Brecon, 1763–1805
- Edward Edwards (Royal Navy officer) (1742–1815), British naval officer
- Edward Edwards (serial killer) (1933–2011), convicted American serial killer
- Edward Edwards (zoologist) (1803–1879), Welsh marine zoologist
- Edward I. Edwards (1863–1931), American politician
- Edward Livingston Edwards (1812–1894), Missouri lawyer, state legislator, journalist, and judge
- Ted Edwards (footballer) (1883–1970), Australian rules footballer

== See also ==
- Eddie Edwards (disambiguation)
- Ted Edwards (disambiguation)
- Edwin Edwards (disambiguation)
- Edward Henry Edwardes (1798–1829), English politician
