= Herbert Edwards =

Herbert Edwards may refer to:

- Ringer Edwards (Herbert James Edwards, 1913–2000), Australian soldier
- Herbert Edwards (cricketer, born 1884) (Herbert Ivor Powell Edwards, 1884–1946), English cricketer
- Bert Edwards (cricketer) (Herbert Charles Edwards, 1913–2002), English cricketer

== See also ==
- Herbert Benjamin Edwardes (1819–1868), English administrator, soldier and statesman
- Bert Edwards (disambiguation)
