= Geoffrey Edwards =

Geoffrey Edwards is the name of:

- Geoff Edwards (1931–2014), American actor and game show host
- Geoffrey Edwards (Canadian scientist), Canadian geomatics scientist
- Geoffrey Edwards (political scientist) (born 1945), British academic

== See also ==
- Jeff Edwards (born 1959), American author
