= Mary Edwards =

Mary Edwards may refer to:

- Mary Ann Edwards (1931–2021), American actress
- Mary Cornelia Edwards, British wife of George Vane-Tempest, 5th Marquess of Londonderry
- Mary Edwards (1705–1743), William Hogarth's friend and patron
- Mary Edwards Walker (1832–1919), American feminist, abolitionist, prohibitionist, surgeon, and Medal of Honor recipient
- Mary Edwards Wertsch (born 1951), née Mary Edwards, author
- Mary Edwards Bryan (1846–1913), née Mary Edwards, American journalist and author
- Mary Youngblood (born 1958), née Mary Edwards, flutist
- Mary Edwards (human computer) (c. 1750 – 1815), for the British Nautical Almanac
- Mary Edwell-Burke (1894–1988), née Mary Edwards, Australian painter and carver
- Mary Ellen Edwards (1838–1934), English artist and illustrator
- Mary Stella Edwards (1893–1989), English painter
- Mary Dorothy Edwards (1909–1995), New Zealand architect
- Mary Evelyn Edwards Hunter (1885–1967), née Edwards, American educator and advocate
- Mary Edwards (murder victim), murder victim and schoolteacher from Beaumont, Texas
- Mary Ruth Edwards, candidate in the United States House of Representatives elections in Washington, 2010

== See also ==
- Edwards (surname)
