= Helen Edwards =

Helen Edwards may refer to

- Helen Edwards (artist) (1882–1963), British artist
- Helen Edwards (civil servant) (born 1953), British civil servant
- Helen Edwards (writer), Australian writer of several historical novels, including A Light on the Rocks (2026)
- Helen T. Edwards (1936–2016), American physicist

== See also ==
- Edwards (surname)
