= Ted Edwards =

Ted Edwards may refer to:

- Ted Edwards (footballer) (1883–1970), Australian rules footballer
- Ted Edwards (actor) (1884–1945), England-born American film actor

== See also ==
- Teddy Edwards (1924–2003), American jazz tenor saxophonist.
- Teddy Edwards (singer-songwriter) (born 1999), American singer, songwriter and producer
- "Big Boy" Teddy Edwards, American blues musician
