= Elizabeth Edwards (disambiguation) =

Elizabeth Edwards (1949–2010) was an attorney and author.

Elizabeth Edwards may also refer to:

- Betty Edwards (born 1926), art teacher and author
- Betty Edwards (swimmer) (1911–2009), Canadian Olympic swimmer
- Elizabeth Edwards (historian) (born 1952), professor and researcher in the history of photography
- Elizabeth Edwards (politician) (born 1988), member of the New Hampshire House of Representatives
- Elizabeth A. Edwards, Canadian chemical and environmental engineer
- Maudie Edwards (Elizabeth Maud Edwards, 1906–1991), actress, comedian and singer
- Elizabeth Todd Edwards (1813–1888), sister of Mary Todd Lincoln

== See also ==
- Edwards (surname)
- Eliza Edwards (1779–1846), human computer
