= Graham Edwards =

Graham Edwards may refer to:

- Graham Edwards (footballer) (born 1936), English footballer active in the Netherlands
- Graham Edwards (politician) (born 1946), Australian politician
- Graham Edwards (musician)
- Graham Edwards (treasurer), British businessman and political party official
- Graham Edwards (writer) (born 1965), English novelist
- Graham Edwards (Zimbabwean cricketer) (1970), former Zimbabwean cricketer
- Jock Edwards (Graham Neil Edwards, 1955–2020), New Zealand cricketer
