= Richard Whitman =

Richard Whitman may refer to:

- Richard G. Whitman, academic, think tank member and media commentator
- Richard Ray Whitman (born 1949), Yuchi-Muscogee Creek artist

== See also ==
- Dick Whitman, American baseball player
