= Gareth Evans =

Gareth Evans may refer to:

== Sportspeople ==
- Gareth Evans (footballer, born 1967), English former professional footballer
- Gareth Evans (footballer, born 1981), English former professional footballer
- Gareth Evans (footballer, born 1987), Welsh former professional footballer
- Gareth Evans (footballer, born 1988), English current professional footballer
- Gareth Evans (racing driver) (born 1959), British former racing driver
- Gareth Evans (rugby union, born 1952), Welsh former rugby union player
- Gareth Evans (rugby union, born August 1991), New Zealand former rugby union player
- Gareth Evans (rugby union, born September 1991), English former rugby union player
- Gareth Evans (weightlifter) (born 1986), British weightlifter

== Other ==
- Gareth Evans (filmmaker) (born 1980), Welsh film director
- Gareth Evans (geneticist) (born 1959), British geneticist
- Gareth Evans (philosopher) (1946–1980), philosopher at Oxford University
- Gareth Evans (politician) (born 1944), Australian former politician

== See also ==
- Garth Evans, sculptor
- Gary Evans (disambiguation)
- Gareth Edwards (disambiguation)
