= Gareth Edwards =

Gareth Edwards may refer to:

- Gareth Edwards (rugby union) (born 1947), Welsh rugby union player
- Gareth Edwards (Welsh cricketer) (born 1976), Welsh cricketer
- Gareth Edwards (Berkshire cricketer) (born 1973), English cricketer
- Gareth Edwards (filmmaker) (born 1975), British filmmaker
- Gareth Edwards (producer) (born 1965), British radio and television writer and producer

== See also ==
- Gary Edwards (disambiguation)
- Gareth Evans (disambiguation)
