= Charles Keyes =

Charles Keyes may refer to:

- Charles Patton Keyes (1822–1896), British Indian Army officer
- Charles Henry Keyes (1858–1925), American educator
- Charles R. Keyes (1871–1951), Iowa archaeologist
- Charles Rollin Keyes (1864–1942), American geologist
