= Edwards Range =

Mountain range in British Columbia, Canada

Geography
- Country: Canada
- Region: British Columbia
- Range coordinates: 52°12.4′N 126°12.7′W
- Parent range: Pacific Ranges

The Edwards Range is a small mountain range near the northern end of the Pacific Ranges of the Coast Mountains of British Columbia, Canada, located north of Gellenspetz Creek and southeast of the town of Bella Coola. It has an area of 179 km^{2}.

== Name origin ==
The range is named for Ralph Edwards, a pioneering settler and conservationist whose biography, Crusoe of Lonesome Lake, written by Leland Stowe, is a well known work of wilderness literature. Edwards is also known for his work protecting trumpeter swans in Tweedsmuir South Provincial Park.

== See also ==
- List of mountain ranges
