= Gary Edwards =

Gary Edwards may refer to:

- Gary Edwards (ice hockey) (born 1947), Canadian ice hockey player
- Gary Edwards (photographer) (born 1967), British photographer
- Gary Edwards (rugby league) (born 1970), Australian rugby league player

== See also ==
- Garry Edwards (born 1950), Australian politician
- Gareth Edwards (disambiguation)
