= Overseas Press Club (radio program) =

Radio program

- Genre: Talk radio
- Country of origin: United States
- Language(s): English
- Home station: WNYC
- Created by: Overseas Press Club
- Original release: 1940 – 1970s
- No. of episodes: Unknown
- Sponsored by: Overseas Press Club, WNYC

The Overseas Press Club aired a variety of programming on WNYC from the 1940s to the mid-1970s, including an regularly scheduled self-titled series in the 1960s.

The OPC was established in 1939 by a group of past and present foreign correspondents. Its stated purpose was to "bring together men and women whose past and present activities in the service abroad of the American press has given them common professional and social interests; to provide facilities for the expression of those interests; to promote good fellowship among its members, and to encourage the highest standards of independence, democracy and professional skill in the American foreign press services." The Overseas Press Club first hit WNYC airwaves the following year, with an awards program honoring Leland Stowe, Hallett Abend, and Edward R. Murrow. The Overseas Press Club would air programming intermittently over the years, but would begin broadcasting regularly under the OPC Presidency of Barrett McGurn of the New York Herald Tribune in 1963. During that run, the Overseas Press Club would broadcast speeches and interviews from Günter Grass, Arthur M. Schlesinger Jr., Josephine Baker, future mayor Abraham Beame, future president Richard Nixon, and future Amiri Baraka LeRoi Jones, among many others. The OPC's presence on WNYC would lessen with the municipal budget crises of the late1960s and 70s.
