= Samantha Edwards =

Samantha Edwards may refer to:

- Samantha Edwards (athlete)
- Samantha Edwards (singer)

== See also ==
- Sam Edwards (disambiguation)
