= Elodie (disambiguation) =

Élodie is a feminine given name.

Élodie or Elodie may also refer to:

- ELODIE spectrograph at the Observatoire de Haute-Provence
- 10726 Elodie, a main-belt minor planet
- Elodie (singer), Italian singer Elodie Di Patrizi (born 1990)
