= Bert Edwards =

Bert Edwards may refer to:

- Bert Edwards (politician) (1887–1963), Australian publican and politician
- Bert Edwards (cricketer) (1913–2002), English cricketer
- Bert Edwards (footballer) (1915–1995), Australian rules footballer
- Bert Edwards (speedway rider) (1917–1982), English international speedway rider

== See also ==
- Herbert Edwards (disambiguation)
- Robert Edwards (disambiguation)
- Albert Edwards (disambiguation)
