= Walter Edwards =

Walter Edwards may refer to:

- Walter Alison Edwards (1862–1924), president of the California Institute of Technology
- Walter Edwards (director) (1870–1920), American film director
- Walter Atlee Edwards (1886–1928), United States Navy officer and Medal of Honor recipient
- Stoker Edwards (1900–1964), British Member of Parliament
- Walter Edwards (footballer) (1924–2018), English footballer
- Wally Edwards (born 1949), Australian cricketer

== See also ==
- Wally Edward, Australian footballer
