= Anthony Edwards =

Anthony Edwards may refer to:

== Arts and entertainment ==
- Anthony Edwards (actor) (born 1962), American actor and director
- Tony Edwards (cartoonist) (born 1944), Australian comic book artist and illustrator
- Tony Edwards (manager) (1932–2010), English music manager and music producer

== Sports ==
- Anthony Edwards (American football) (born 1966), American football wide receiver
- Anthony Edwards (basketball) (born 2001), American basketball player
- Anthony Edwards (rower) (born 1972), Australian Olympic rower
- Anthony Roland Gamul MacLeod Edwards (1910–1978), English member of Delhi cricket team

== Others ==
- Anthony David Edwards (born 1954), British doctor and medical researcher
- A. S. G. Edwards (Anthony Stockwell Garfield Edwards, born 1942), American scholar of medieval literature and manuscripts
- A. W. F. Edwards (Anthony William Fairbank Edwards, born 1935), British geneticist and statistician

== See also ==
- Edwards (surname)
