= Raymond Edwards =

Raymond Edwards may refer to:

- Raymond Clare Edwards (1920–2017), politician in Ontario, Canada
- Raymond Edwards (1922–1997), bass player for The Silhouettes
- Raymond Edwards (game designer), see Spiel des Jahres
- Raymond Edwards (swimmer), represented Barbados at the 2010 Commonwealth Games

== See also ==
- Ray Edwards (disambiguation)
