= Disability and Rehabilitation: Assistive Technology =

- Discipline: Rehabilitation medicine
- Language: English
- Edited by: Marcia J. Scherer

Publication details
- History: 2006
- Publisher: Taylor and Francis Group
- Frequency: Bimonthly

Standard abbreviations
- ISO 4: Disabil. Rehabil.: Assist. Technol.
- NLM: Disabil Rehabil Assist Technol

Indexing
- ISSN: 1748-3107 (print); 1748-3115 (web)
- LCCN: 2006243156
- OCLC no.: 321020372

Links
- Journal homepage; Online access; Online archive

Disability and Rehabilitation: Assistive Technology is a bimonthly peer-reviewed medical journal covering research on physical medicine and rehabilitation, including practice and policy aspects of the rehabilitation process. It was established in 2006 as an offshoot of Disability and Rehabilitation. The journal is published by Taylor and Francis Group and the editor-in-chief is Marcia J. Scherer (Institute for Matching Person & Technology).
