= Élodie =

Élodie is a French feminine given name, a variant of Alodia, possibly a Gothic name with elements Ala, perhaps meaning 'other' or 'all', and od, 'wealth, heritage'. The given name was popularized via veneration of Saint Alodia, a 9th-century child martyr.

== People ==
- Élodie Bouchez (born 1973), French actress
- Elodie Di Patrizi (born 1990), Italian singer also known simply as Elodie
- Elodie Edwards-Grossi, French historian and sociologist
- Élodie Frégé (born 1982), French singer
- Élodie Frenck (born 1974), Peruvian-Swiss-French actress
- Élodie Gagnon, Canadian radio personality
- Elodie Ghedin (born 1967), Canadian parasitologist and virologist
- Élodie Gossuin (born 1980), French politician and beauty pageant contestant, Miss France 2001 and Miss Europe 2001
- Élodie Guégan (born 1985), French middle-distance runner
- Elodie Harper (born 1979), English author and news reporter
- Élodie Jacquier-Laforge (born 1978), French politician
- Elodie Keene (born 1949), American television director
- Elodie Kuijper (born 2000), Dutch racing cyclist
- Elodie Lauten (1950–2014), French-born American composer
- Élodie La Villette (1848–1917), French painter
- Elodie Lawton (1825–1908), British writer and abolitionist
- Élodie Mailloux (1865–1937), Canadian nun and nursing school founding director
- Élodie Murphy-Gauthier, Quebec politician
- Élodie Nakkach (born 1995), Moroccan footballer
- Élodie Navarre (born 1979), French actress
- Élodie Grace Orkin (born 2004), British-American actress
- Élodie Ouédraogo (born 1981), Belgian sprinter and hurdler
- Élodie Ramos (born 1983), French footballer
- Élodie Thomis (born 1986), French footballer
- Élodie Woock (born 1976), French footballer
- Élodie Yung (born 1981), French film actress

== See also ==
- ELODIE spectrograph
- Eloise (name)
