= Allen Edwards =

Allen Edwards may refer to:

- Allen Edwards (basketball) (born 1975), American basketball player and coach
- Allen Edwards (cricketer) (1868–1961), Australian cricketer

== See also ==
- Alan Edwards (disambiguation)
- Allan Edwards (disambiguation)
- Al Edwards (disambiguation)
- Allen Edwardes, pen-name of D. A. Kinsley (born 1939), scholar of Middle Eastern and Oriental erotica and sexual practices
