= Ralph Edwards (homesteader) =

Canadian homesteader (1892–1977)

Ralph Edwards OC
- Born: 1891 or 1892; North Carolina
- Died: July 3, 1977 (aged 84–86); Prince Rupert, British Columbia
- Occupations: Farmer, hunter/trapper, fisherman, amateur pilot
- Known for: DIY ethic, conservation efforts

Ralph Edwards, OC (c. 1892 – July 3, 1977) was a pioneering British Columbian homesteader, amateur pilot and leading conservationist of the trumpeter swan. He received the Order of Canada in 1972 for his conservation efforts, and is the namesake of the Edwards Range mountains. Edwards and his family were celebrated in a number of books and films, including Leland Stowe's best-selling Crusoe of Lonesome Lake (1957), which led to Edwards being the surprise honoree on the 1957 Christmas Day edition of This Is Your Life.

== Biography ==
=== Early life ===
Edwards was born around 1891–92 in the mountains of North Carolina. After a few years he moved with his medical-missionary parents to India where he spent three years in the foothills of the Himalayas, until the age of eight, coming to love the mountains. He then returned to North Carolina for two years of school, and then to Massachusetts where he lived with his great-uncle, helping him on his farm, and developing a love of farming. In his mid-teens he moved to Oregon, where his nomadic parents had settled. At age 16, he found work in British Columbia on a railroad construction crew. Edwards' deep interest in farming and mountains came together when he learned he could get free land in British Columbia as part of a state homesteading program. Between the ages of 17 and 21, he taught himself how to be a farmer using books and working as a farmhand. In 1913, at the age of 21, he was granted a 160-acre tract in the Atnarko valley on the eastern edge of the Coast Mountains in British Columbia.

=== Farm and family ===
Edwards chose a location for the farm forty-miles walk from the nearest human settlement, deep in the mountains over a treacherous trail on the far end of Lonesome Lake (which Edwards named), in what is today Tweedsmuir South Provincial Park. Winters were long, snowy and very cold. Dangerous wild animals such as grizzly bears and cougars were everywhere. He spent the first decade alone, clearing towering virgin forests of cedar trees with hand tools, building a multistory log home, shooting and trapping game. He rarely left the farm, and could only bring in from the outside what he could carry on his back and packhorse over a difficult mountainous trail, which took at least two days to traverse. Edwards named the farm "The Birches".

In 1917, he enlisted with the United States Army as a radio operator, and fought in World War I with the Fourth Division's 8th Field Signal Battalion, serving at the Battle of Château-Thierry and later with occupation forces on the Rhine. He was discharged nine months after the armistice, and returned to The Birches. In 1923, he married a local girl, Ethel Hober, and they raised three children on the farm: Stanley, Johnny and the youngest, daughter Trudy. The children were schooled through a correspondence system, and had access to Ralph's extensive home library.

The Edwards family became locally renowned for their pioneering self-sufficiency and DIY ethic. Since it required so much effort to bring material in from the outside they tried to make as much as they could from scratch. Beyond such things as making their own shoes and spinning wool into clothing, accomplishments included a water-powered saw mill, and even an electric-generator powered by the river, enough to keep a single light-bulb going at night. He studied for a decade to build an airplane, teaching himself advanced mathematics and aeronautic engineering, although in the end he was forced to buy a used plane due to legal restrictions. His daughter Trudy learned to fly the plane first, then, the age of 62, Edwards obtained his pilot's license after only 28 hours of instruction; at the time, he was the oldest pilot in Canada to ever qualify. During his physical his doctor said he was healthier than men half his age.

Over the years, as Edwards' farm and family prospered, the legend of his accomplishments spread. In 1956, the Pulitzer Prize-winning journalist Leland Stowe visited The Birches for 12 days on assignment with Reader's Digest. From his interviews with Edwards, Stowe wrote a biography called Crusoe of Lonesome Lake (1957). Stowe saw Edwards as a modern-day Robinson Crusoe, self-sufficiently carving a bountiful existence out of harsh but beautiful land. The book sold well, and Edwards became somewhat famous thereafter. Popular interest was such that Edwards was the honoree on the 1957 Christmas Day edition of This Is Your Life, hosted by Ralph Edwards (no relation). Guests for the show included his younger brother, whom he had not seen in 35 years; former Army comrades he had not seen in 38 years; and his 93-year-old mother.

=== Final years and postscript ===
Edwards separated from his wife in 1965, having sold The Birches to American buyers against her will. Ethel arranged with the buyers that she could continue to live there; their elder son, Stanley, who had left Lonesome Lake at seventeen, returned to live with his mother, and their younger son, John, eventually repurchased it. Edwards then took up commercial ocean fishing in his 70s, and for the remainder of his days lived in Prince Rupert. He died in 1977 of cancer.

By the time Ethel Edwards died, nobody was living at The Birches, and the property had begun reverting back to nature. John Edwards made efforts to restore the farm beginning in the late 1980s, but all the buildings on the property burned to the ground in a forest fire in July–August 2004, and John died in 2007. A documentary called Crusoe of Lonesome Lake was filmed in 1988 by Tony Wade, featuring footage of the historic property and buildings before the fire. Ralph's granddaughter Susan Turner (the daughter of Trudy) inherited the land; around 2024 she sold it to a non-profit that had raised money from donations around the world, who then donated the property to Tweedsmuir Provincial Park.

== Trumpeter swans ==
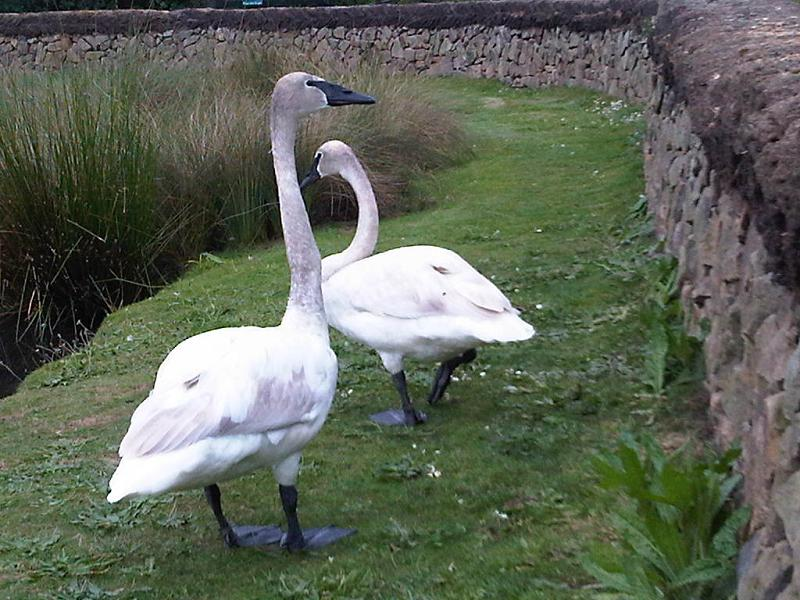
Trumpeter swans at WWT London Wetland Centre, England

When Edwards first arrived, Lonesome Lake was home to a gaggle of trumpeter swan refugees, a species facing extinction due to over-hunting in the 19th and early 20th centuries. The lake's remoteness offered the swans safety, but at the cost of starvation during severe winters. In 1925, the Canadian government enlisted Edwards' help to feed the swans during winter. Over the years, a number of family members took on the task – first Ralph, then Stan, John, and Trudy – using sacks of corn which were hauled in by packhorse.

During Princess Elizabeth's 1951 tour of Canada, she was promised a Dominion gift of trumpeter swans, by arrangement of British conservationist Peter Scott, who was head of the Severn Wildlife Trust in Britain (now known as the Wildfowl & Wetlands Trust). Canadian officials discovered the only swans tame enough to capture were at Lonesome Lake as they had been fed by Edwards family for decades. In 1952, with the help of Ralph and his daughter Trudy Turner (Trudy had by now entirely taken over the feeding of them), five were captured and flown to England, the first time trumpeter swans had ever flown across the Atlantic (although, in the 19th century, the swans had been brought by ship to European zoos). One later died, and the remaining four thrived at WWT Slimbridge. The Queen in later years became Patron to the WWT, and Prince Charles the WWT President.

In 1972, Edwards received the Order of Canada (Medal of Service) – the highest Canadian award for conservation – for his work with the swans. By the 1980s, trumpeter swan populations had increased throughout their range, and the Canadian government stopped its feeding program. Many of the swans cared for by the Edwards family subsequently died of starvation, but others found new homes elsewhere in less cold and remote areas. It is unclear how effective the Edwards' feeding program was in the end, but the species today is better protected from hunting, and is no longer considered endangered.

== See also ==
- Ralph Edwards (disambiguation)
