= John Spink =

British Army general

General Sir John Spink KH
- Born: 1783; Staithes, North Riding of Yorkshire
- Died: 14 March 1877 (aged 93–94); Norwood Park, London
- Military career
- Allegiance: United Kingdom
- Branch: British Army
- Rank: General
- Conflicts: Napoleonic Wars
- Awards: Knight of the Royal Guelphic Order

General Sir John Spink KH (1783 – 14 March 1877) was a British Army officer who became colonel of the 2nd (The Queen's Royal) Regiment of Foot.

== Military career ==
Spink was commissioned as an ensign in the 12th Regiment of Foot on 2 September 1806. After seeing action in India between 1808 and 1809 during the Travancore Rebellion, he led an attack on an enemy position on the island of Réunion in the Indian Ocean in 1810 and then took part in the Invasion of Isle de France also in the Indian Ocean and subsequent march on its capital, Port Louis, in November 1810 during the Napoleonic Wars.

He went on to be colonel of the 2nd (The Queen's Royal) Regiment of Foot from 28 May 1857 to his death in 1877. He was promoted full general in 1865

Honorary titles
Preceded by Sir James Schoedde	Colonel of the 2nd (The Queen's Royal) Regiment of Foot; 1857–1877	Succeeded by Clement Edwards
