= Fred Edwards (footballer) =

Australian rules footballer (1891–1972)

Personal information
- Full name: Charles Frederick Edwards
- Born: 9 October 1891; Richmond, Victoria
- Died: 3 October 1972 (aged 80); Windsor, Victoria
- Original team: Beverley
- Position: Rover

Playing career^{1}
Years	Club	Games (Goals)
1913	Essendon	1 (1)
1913	Melbourne	3 (2)
Total		4 (3)
- ^{1} Playing statistics correct to the end of 1913.

Charles Frederick Edwards (9 October 1891 – 3 October 1972), variously known as "Fred Edwards" and as "Charlie Edwards", was an Australian rules footballer who played with Essendon and Melbourne in the Victorian Football League (VFL).

== Family ==
The son of Charles James Edwards (1866-1938), and Sarah Annie Edwards (1868-1907), née Smith, Charles Frederick Edwards was born at Richmond, Victoria on 9 October 1891.

He married Violet Daphne Hailes (1891-1963) on 7 November 1914.

== Football ==
=== Essendon (VFL) ===
Recruited by Essendon from the Beverley Football Club in the Metropolitan Amateur Football Association (MJFA), he played one senior game for Essendon: against Richmond on 3 May 1913.

The three "new" Essendon footballers who had played on 3 May 1913 — that is, Edwards, Hughie Tait, and Jim Moore — were not selected to play against Collingwood on the following Saturday (10 May 1913).

=== Melbourne (VFL) ===
Cleared from Essendon to Melbourne on 2 July 1913.

== Death ==
He died at Windsor, Victoria on 3 October 1972.
