= 1844 Missouri gubernatorial election =

- August 5, 1844
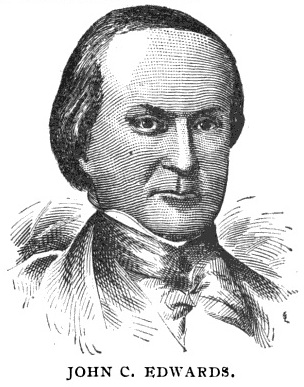

Nominee	John C. Edwards	Charles Allen
Party	Democratic	Whig
Popular vote	36,978	31,357
Percentage	54.11%	45.89%
- County results Edwards: 50–60% 60–70% 70–80% 80–90% Allen: 50–60% 60–70% 70–80% 90–100% No Data/Vote
Governor before election
Meredith Miles Marmaduke
Democratic
Elected Governor
John C. Edwards
Democratic

The 1844 Missouri gubernatorial election was held on August 5, 1844, Missouri Secretary of State John C. Edwards, the Democratic nominee, defeated Whig candidate Charles H. Allen.

== General election ==
=== Candidates ===
- Charles H. Allen (Whig)
- John C. Edwards, Missouri Secretary of State (Democratic)

=== Results ===
1844 gubernatorial election, Missouri
Party	Candidate	Votes	%	±%
Democratic	John C. Edwards	36,978	54.11	−3.04
Whig	Charles H. Allen	31,357	45.89	+3.04
Majority		5,621	8.22	−6.08
Turnout		68,335	17.81	
Democratic hold		Swing		
