= Allan Edwards =

Allan Edwards may refer to:

- Allan Edwards (footballer) (born 1957), Australian rules footballer
- Allan Edwards (Australian cricketer) (1921–2019), Australian cricketer
- Allan Edwards (New Zealand cricketer) (1920–1942), New Zealand cricketer
- Allan Roy Edwards (ice hockey) (1937–1999), Canadian ice hockey player

== See also ==
- Alan Edwards (disambiguation)
- Allen Edwards (disambiguation)
- Al Edwards (disambiguation)
