= Frederick Edwards =

Frederick or Fred Edwards may refer to:

- Fred Edwards (footballer) (1891–1972), Australian rules footballer
- Frederick Edwards (cricketer) (1908–1982), Australian cricketer
- Frederick Erasmus Edwards (1799–1875), British law clerk and amateur geologist
- Frederick Jeremiah Edwards (1894–1964), Irish recipient of the Victoria Cross
- Frederick Wallace Edwards (1888–1940), British entomologist
- J. Fred Edwards (1902–1978), politician in Ontario, Canada
