= Ralph Edwards (disambiguation) =

Ralph Edwards (1913–2005) was an American radio and television host

Ralph Edwards may also refer to:

- Ralph Edwards (homesteader) (circa 1892–1977), British Columbia homesteader and conservationist
- Ralph Edwards (footballer) (1935–2019), Australian footballer for Footscray
- Ralph Edwards (Royal Navy officer) (1901–1963), British admiral
- Ralph Edwards (politician), politician in Maine
- Edwards (second baseman) (fl. 1915), American baseball infielder formerly identified as "Ralph Edwards"
