= Ray Edwards =

Ray Edwards may refer to:

- Ray K. Edwards (1923–1942), United States Marine Corps corporal who received a posthumous Silver Star
- Ray Edwards (boxer) (1927–1991), Jamaican boxer
- Ray Edwards (ice hockey) (born 1970), Canadian ice hockey coach
- Ray Edwards (American football) (born 1985), American football defensive end
- USS Ray K. Edwards (APD-96), United States Navy high-speed transport, named after the marine

== See also ==
- Raymond Edwards (disambiguation)
