= Justice Edwards =

Justice Edwards may refer to:

- George Clifton Edwards Jr. (1914–1995), associate justice of the Michigan Supreme Court
- John A. Edwards (born 1960), judge of the Irish Court of Appeal
- John Cummins Edwards (1804–1888), associate justice of the Missouri Supreme Court

== See also ==
- Judge Edwards (disambiguation)
