= Judge Edwards =

Judge Edwards may refer to:

- Edward Livingston Edwards (1812–1894), judge of the Missouri First Judicial Circuit
- George Clifton Edwards Jr. (1914–1995), judge of the United States Court of Appeals for the Sixth Circuit
- Harry T. Edwards (born 1940), judge of the United States Court of Appeals for the District of Columbia Circuit
- Jerry Edwards Jr. (born 1979), judge of the United States District Court for the Western District of Louisiana
- Pierpont Edwards (1750–1826), judge of the United States District Court for the District of Connecticut

== See also ==
- Justice Edwards (disambiguation)
