= James Augustin Brown Scherer =

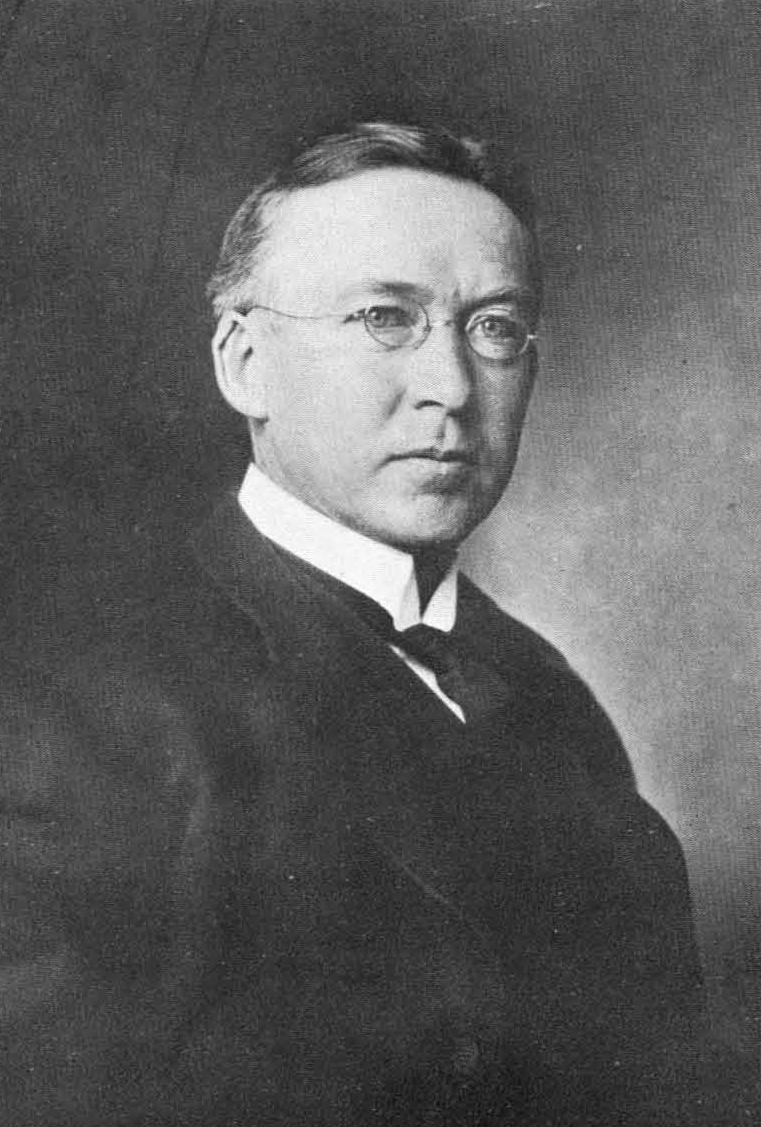
- Rev. Dr. James A. B. Scherer in 1920

3rd & last President of Throop Polytechnic Institute
- In office October 1, 1908 – September 12, 1920
- Preceded by: Walter Alison Edwards

6th President of Newberry College
- In office 1904–1908
- Preceded by: George B. Cromer
- Succeeded by: J. Henry Harms

Personal details
- Born: May 22, 1870 Salisbury, North Carolina, US
- Died: February 15, 1944 (aged 73) Santa Monica, California, US

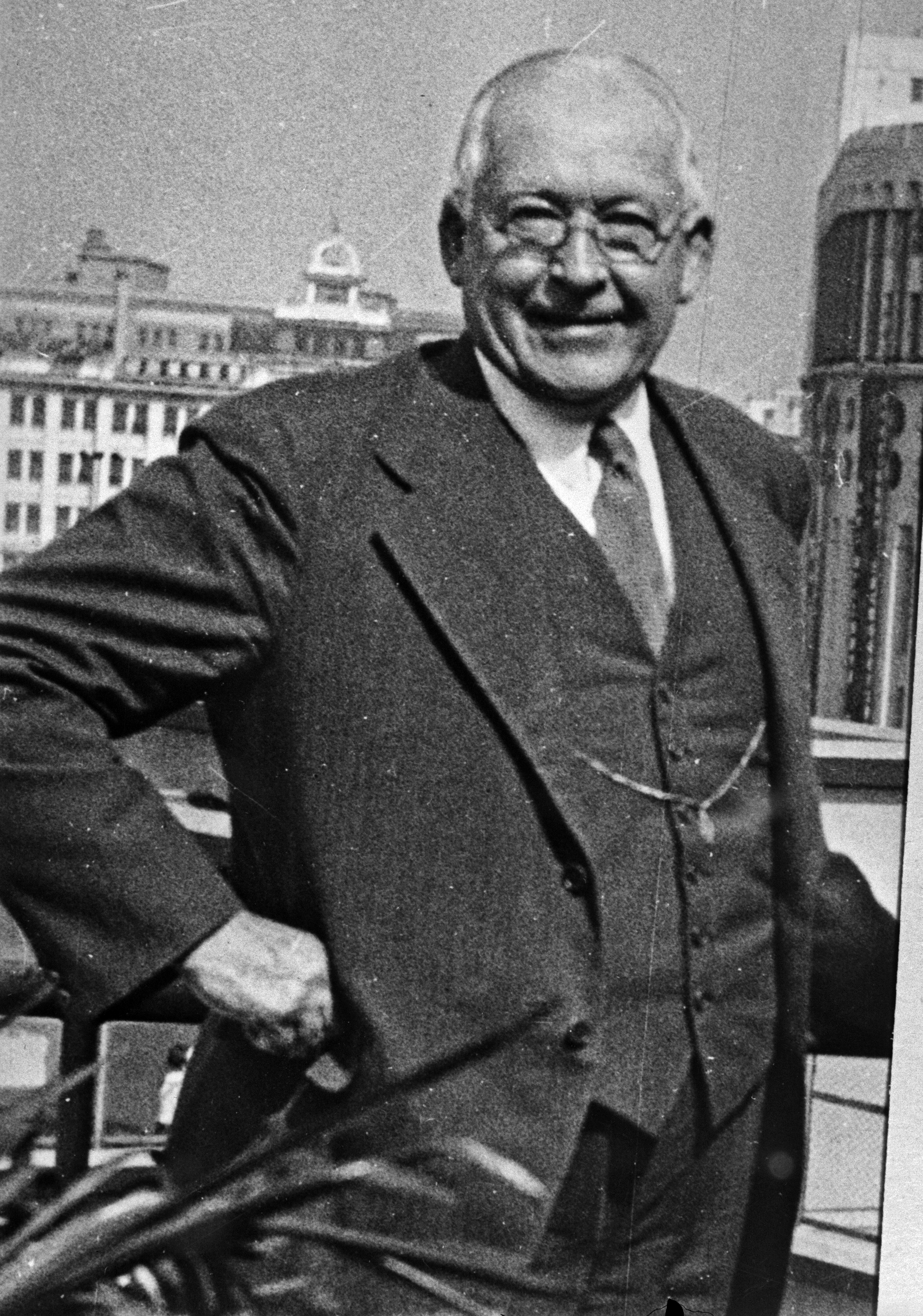
Scherer in 1935

James A. B. Scherer (1870–1944) was a Lutheran minister who served as the last president of the Throop Polytechnic Institute from 1908 to 1920 prior to its renaming to the California Institute of Technology in 1921. He officially resigned in September 1920 after being on a health-related leave of absence since April 1920. He was later hired by Famous Players-Lasky as a screenwriter.

Before being asked by George Ellery Hale to serve as President of Throop, Scherer was a Lutheran minister, one of the founders of the Japan Evangelical Lutheran Church and also president of Newberry College, a Lutheran College in South Carolina that primarily trained young men for the ministry before it was secularized. He is responsible for the foundations of Caltech and helped bring Arthur Noyes and Robert Millikan to Caltech to complete the driving triumvirate.

After Caltech and his brief foray into the motion pictures industry, Scherer served as director of the Southwest Museum of the American Indian from 1926 until 1931.

Due to his fluency in the Japanese language, Scherer was employed during World War II by the United States Office of War Information to broadcast bi-weekly information and possibly propaganda from the American government directly to Japanese soldiers and civilians overseas via shortwave radio.

James Augustin Brown Scherer was born on May 22, 1870, to Reverend Simon Scherer and Harriet Isabella Brown Scherer in Salisbury, North Carolina.

Scherer died in his Santa Monica home at age of 73 on February 15, 1944.
