= Al Edwards =

Al Edwards may refer to:

- Al Edwards (American football) (born 1967), American football wide receiver
- Al Edwards (politician) (1937–2020), American politician

== See also ==
- Alan Edwards (disambiguation)
- Allan Edwards (disambiguation)
- Allen Edwards (disambiguation)
- Albert Edwards (disambiguation)
- Alexander Edwards (disambiguation)
