= Alexander Edwards (disambiguation) =

Alexander Edwards (1885–1918) was a Scottish recipient of the Victoria Cross

Alexander or Alex Edwards may also refer to:

- Alexander Edwards (politician) (1876–1938), Canadian businessman and politician
- Alex Edwards (cricketer) (born 1975), English cricketer
- Alex Edwards (footballer) (1946–2024), Scottish football winger

== See also ==
- Al Edwards (disambiguation)
- Alexander Edward, priest of the Scottish Episcopal Church
