= Albert Edwards =

Albert Edwards may refer to:

- Albert Edwards (footballer) (flourished 1910s, died 1918), English footballer
- Albert Gallatin Edwards (1812–1892), American businessman and Assistant Secretary of the U.S. Treasury
- Turk Edwards (Albert Glen Edwards, 1907–1973), American football tackle and coach

== See also ==
- Al Edwards (disambiguation)
- Bert Edwards (disambiguation)
