= Gary Evans =

Gary Evans may refer to:

- Gary Evans (serial killer) (1954–1998), American serial killer
- Gary Evans (racing driver) (born 1960), British former racing driver
- Gary Evans (golfer) (born 1969), English golfer
- Gary Evans (psychologist) (born 1948), American psychologist
- Gary Evans (footballer), English footballer, see List of Cleveland Force (1978–1988) players
- Gary Evans (footballer, born 1982), English footballer for Bury and Hyde United, see List of Bury F.C. players (1–24 appearances)

== See also ==
- Gareth Evans (disambiguation)
