= General Edwards (disambiguation) =

Clarence Ransom Edwards (1859–1931) was a U.S. Army major general. General Edwards may also refer to:

- Clement Alexander Edwards (1812–1882), British Army general
- Donald E. Edwards (1937–2018), U.S. Army major general
- Idwal H. Edwards (1895–1981), U.S. Air Force lieutenant general
- James Bevan Edwards (1834–1922), British Army lieutenant general
- John Edwards (Arkansas politician) (1815–1894), Union Army brigadier general
- John Edwards (British Army officer) (born 1896), British Army major general
- Oliver Edwards (1835–1904), Union Army brevet major general
- Oliver Edwards (World War I general) (1871–1921), U.S. Army brigadier general
- William F.S. Edwards (1872–1941), British Army brigadier general
