= Senator Edwards =

Senator Edwards may refer to:

== Members of the United States Senate ==
- Edward I. Edwards (1863–1931), U.S. Senator from New Jersey from 1923 to 1929
- Elaine Edwards (1929–2018), U.S. Senator from Louisiana in 1972
- John Edwards (Kentucky politician) (1748–1837), U.S. Senator from Kentucky
- John Edwards (born 1953), U.S. Senator from North Carolina

== United States state senate members ==
- Chet Edwards (born 1951), Texas State Senate
- Chris Edwards (Oregon politician) (born 1973), Oregon State Senate
- Chuck Edwards (born 1960), North Carolina State Senate
- Edwin Edwards (1927–2021), Louisiana State Senate
- George C. Edwards (born 1948), Maryland State Senate
- Henry W. Edwards (1779–1847), Connecticut State Senate
- James B. Edwards (1927–2014), South Carolina State Senate
- John S. Edwards (Virginia politician) (born 1943), Virginia State Senate
- John Edwards (Arkansas politician) (1805–1894), Arkansas State Senate
- L. K. Edwards Jr. (1917–1989), Florida State Senate
- Lewis A. Edwards (1811–1879), New York State Senate
- Martin Koons Edwards (1938–2017), Indiana State Senate
- Ninian Wirt Edwards (1809–1889), Illinois State Senate
- Ninian Edwards (1775–1833), Illinois State Senate
- Ralph Edwards (politician) (fl. 1940s), Maine State Senate
- Samuel L. Edwards (1789–1877), New York State Senate
- Weldon Nathaniel Edwards (1788–1873), North Carolina State Senate
- William Edwards (Wisconsin politician) (1861–1944), Wisconsin State Senate
