= Sarah Edwards =

Sarah or Sara Edwards may refer to:

- Sarah Edwards (missionary) (1710–1758), Colonial American mystic and missionary
- Sarah Edwards (actress) (1881–1965), Welsh-born American actress
- Sara Edwards (American television host) (born 1952), reporter, producer, film critic and media consultant
- Sarah Edwards (American politician) (born 1953), American member of Vermont House of Representatives
- Sara Edwards (born 1963), Welsh television news presenter
- Sarah Edwards (cricketer) (born 1982), Australian cricketer, married name Sarah Elliott
- Sarah Edwards (British politician) (born 1998), British politician
- Sarah Edwards (Welsh politician), Welsh politician
