= Eddie Edwards =

Eddie Edwards may refer to:

- Eddie Edwards (American football) (born 1954), American football player
- Eddie Edwards (musician) (1899–1963), American jazz trombonist
- Eddie Edwards (tennis) (born 1956), South African tennis player
- "Eddie the Eagle" Edwards (born 1963), real name Michael Edwards, British ski jumper
- Eddie Edwards (wrestler) (born 1983), American professional wrestler
- Eddie Edwards (born 1968), American civil servant; see 2018 United States House of Representatives elections in New Hampshire#eddie_edwards

== See also ==
- Ed Edwards, advertising executive and filmmaker
- Edward Edwards (disambiguation)
- Edwin Edwards (disambiguation)
