= Steve Edwards =

Steve, Steven or Stephen Edwards may refer to:

- Steve Edwards (American football) (born 1979), American football player for the Arizona Rattlers
- Steve Edwards (field hockey) (born 1986), New Zealand Olympic field hockey player
- Steve Edwards (physicist) (1930–2016), Professor Emeritus of Physics, Florida State University
- Steve Edwards (singer) (born 1980), vocalist on Bob Sinclair's World Hold On and Cassius' The Sound of Violence
- Steve Edwards (talk show host) (born 1948), former host of Good Day LA on KTTV (Fired in Dec, 2017)
- Steve Edwards, film editor whose credits include Reign Over Me
- Steve Edwards, guitarist with Elf (band)
- Steve Edwards, radio DJ with BBC Radio 1 (1993–1996)
- Stephen Edwards (alpine skier) (born 1969), British alpine skier
- Stephen Edwards (born 1972), American film and TV composer; see Showdown (1993 film)
- Stephen Edwards (cricketer) (born 1951), English cricketer
- Steven Edwards (basketball) (born 1973), American basketball player
- Steven Edwards (footballer) (born 1991), Dutch footballer
- Steven Edwards (1957–2024), British-born Canadian journalist, formerly with Canwest News Service
- Steven Edwards (The Walking Dead)
- Steve Edwards (footballer) (born 1958), English footballer
- Stephen Edwards (priest) (born 1972), British Anglican priest
