= Walter Alison Edwards =

2nd President of Throop Polytechnic Institute
- In office 1897–1907
- Preceded by: Charles Henry Keyes
- Succeeded by: James Augustin Brown Scherer

Personal details
- Born: 1862
- Died: 1924 (aged 65–66)

Walter Alison Edwards (September 17, 1862 in Normal, Illinois– 1924) was a U.S. educator. He served as the president of the Throop Polytechnic Institute (which later became Caltech) from 1897 to 1907.
