= Edwin Edwards (disambiguation) =

Edwin Edwards (1927–2021) was the 50th governor of Louisiana.

Edwin Edwards may also refer to:

- Edwin Edwards (artist) (1823–1879), British painter, engraver and lawyer
- Edwin Edwards (New Zealand politician) (1862–1909), English-born New Zealand businessman and local politician
- Edwin Edwards (organist) (1830–1907), British academic and organist
- Eddie Edwards (musician) (1891–1963, Edwin Branford Edwards), American jazz trombonist

== See also ==
- Eddie Edwards (disambiguation)
- Edward Edwards (disambiguation)
