= Disability and Rehabilitation =

- Discipline: Physical medicine and rehabilitation
- Language: English

Publication details
- History: 1978-present
- Publisher: Taylor and Francis Group
- Frequency: Biweekly
- Impact factor: 2.054 (2018)

Standard abbreviations
- ISO 4: Disabil. Rehabil.

Indexing
- CODEN: DREHET
- ISSN: 0963-8288 (print); 1464-5165 (web)
- OCLC no.: 25415346

Links
- Journal homepage; Online access; Online archive

Disability and Rehabilitation is a peer-reviewed medical journal covering all aspects of disability and rehabilitation medicine, including practice and policy aspects of the rehabilitation process. The journal is published by Taylor and Francis Group and the editor-in-chief is Dave Müller (Suffolk New College). It was established in 1978 and has a 2018 impact factor of 2.054. The journal is published 26 times a year.
