= Roger Edwards =

Roger Edwards may refer to:

- Roger Nicholas Edwards (1934–2018), British politician and a former Secretary of State for Wales
- G. Roger Edwards (1915–2009), American archaeologist and curator for the University of Pennsylvania Museum of Archaeology and Anthropology.
- Roger Edwards (Calvinist) (1811–1886), Welsh Calvinistic Methodist
- Roger Edwards (politician) (born 1946), Falkland Islands politician
- Roger Edwards (meteorologist), American meteorologist and expert on severe convective storms
