= Sean Edwards =

Sean Edwards may refer to:

- Sean Edwards (racing driver) (1986–2013), English professional racing driver
- Sean Edwards (politician) (born 1962), Australian politician
- Sean Edwards (Neighbours), fictional character on the Australian soap opera Neighbours
