= Arthur Edwards (sailor) =

English sailor

Arthur Edwards was an English sailor and merchant who was sent to the Persian royal court (Tahmasp I) in 1566. He worked for Muscovy Company. Shah Tahmasb gave him permission to trade in Persia (Iran).
