= Geoffrey Edwards (political scientist) =

British academic

- Born: May 3, 1945
- Occupation(s): Political scientist, Professor
- Employer(s): University of Cambridge, Pembroke College, Cambridge
- Known for: Expertise in the foreign and security policies of the European Union
- Awards: UACES Lifetime Achievement Award (2015)

Geoffrey Edwards (born 3 May 1945) is a British political scientist specialising in the foreign and security policies of the European Union. A fellow and a Graduate Tutor of Pembroke College, Cambridge, Geoffrey Edwards is also Reader in European Studies at the Department of Politics and International Studies, University of Cambridge and holds a Jean Monnet chair as Director of European Studies at the Jean Monnet European Centre of Excellence at the same university.

He has held research posts at the Foreign and Commonwealth Office and a number of other institutions including the Federal Trust and Chatham House. He specialises in the European Union, its institutions and external policies. In 2015, he has received the UACES Lifetime Achievement Award.

His publications include The Politics of European Treaty Reform (co-edited with Alfred Pijpers), Cassell, 1997, and The European Commission (co-edited with David Spence, Cartermill, 1997. Since 1998 he has been co-editor of The European Annual Review of Activities for the Journal of Common Market Studies, and he co-authored with Paul Cornish Identifying the Development of an EU Strategic Culture for International Affairs, Vol 7 (3), 2001.

== Selected publications ==
=== Books and edited volumes ===
- Edwards, Geoffrey; Wallace, William (1976). A Wider European Community?: Issues and Problems of Further Enlargement. London: The Federal Trust. ISBN 0-901-57320-5.
- ——— Wallace, Helen (1977). The Council of Ministers of the European Community and the President-in-Office. London: The Federal Trust. ISBN 0-901573-22-1.
- Burrows, Bernard; Denton, Geoffrey; ——— , eds. (1978). Federal Solutions to European Issues. London: Macmillan. ISBN 0-333-21947-3.
- ——— (1979). European Elections: Direct Elections to the European Parliament and Their Aftermath. London: The Federal Trust. ISBN 0-901573-23-X.
- Burrows, Bernard; ——— (1982). The Defence of Western Europe. London: Butterworth Scientific. ISBN 0-408-10702-2.
- Pijpers, Alfred; Regelsberger, Elfriede; Wessels, Wolfgang; ——— , eds. (1988). European Political Cooperation in the 1980s: A Common Foreign Policy for Western Europe?. Dordrecht: Martinus Nijhoff. ISBN 9-024-73773-7.
- Arbuthnott, Hugh; ——— (1989). A Common Man's Guide to the Common Market (2nd ed.). London: Macmillan. ISBN 0-333-24457-5.
- ——— Regelsberger, Elfriede, eds. (1990). Europe's Global Links: The European Community and Inter-regional Cooperation. London: Pinter. ISBN 0-861-87878-7.
- ——— Pijpers, Alfred, eds. (1997). The Politics of European Treaty Reform: The 1996 Intergovernmental Conference and Beyond. London: Pinter. ISBN 1-855-67359-2.
- ——— (2001). The External Relations of the European Union. London: Continuum Books. OCLC 247539147.
- Clarke, John N.; ——— , eds. (2004). Global Governance in the Twenty-First Century. London: Palgrave Macmillan. ISBN 978-0-333-80256-4.
- Spence, David; ——— , eds. (2006). The European Commission (3rd ed.). London: John Harper. ISBN 0-582-21019-4.
- Marchi, Ludovica; Whitman, Richard G.; ——— , eds. (2014). Italy's Foreign Policy in the Twenty-First Century: A Contested Nature?. London: Routledge. ISBN 978-1-317-59475-8.
