= Jim Moore (Australian footballer) =

Australian rules footballer

Personal information
- Full name: James Henry Moore
- Born: 3 June 1891; Appin, Victoria (near Kerang)
- Died: 25 January 1987 (aged 95); Camberwell, Victoria
- Original team: CBC St Kilda

Playing career^{1}
Years	Club	Games (Goals)
1911	Melbourne	1 (0)
1913	Essendon	1 (0)
Total		2 (0)
- ^{1} Playing statistics correct to the end of 1913.

James Henry Moore (3 June 1891 – 25 January 1987) was an Australian rules footballer who played with Melbourne and Essendon in the Victorian Football League (VFL).
