= Arthur Edwards (cleric) =

American clergyman and editor

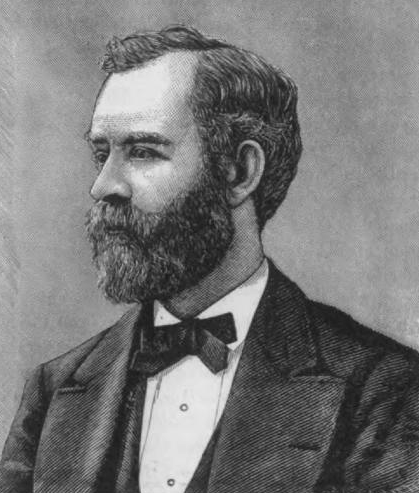
- Born: November 23, 1834; Norwalk, Ohio
- Died: March 20, 1901 (aged 66); Detroit, Michigan
- Burial place: Rosehill Cemetery
- Education: Ohio Wesleyan University
- Occupations: Cleric, editor
- Spouse: Caroline Maria Whitehead (m. 1868)
- Children: 3

Arthur Edwards (November 23, 1834 – March 20, 1901) was an American cleric and editor.

== Early life ==
Edwards was born in Norwalk, Ohio. When he was 7 years old, he was adopted by his uncle, and moved to Michigan.

== Professional life ==
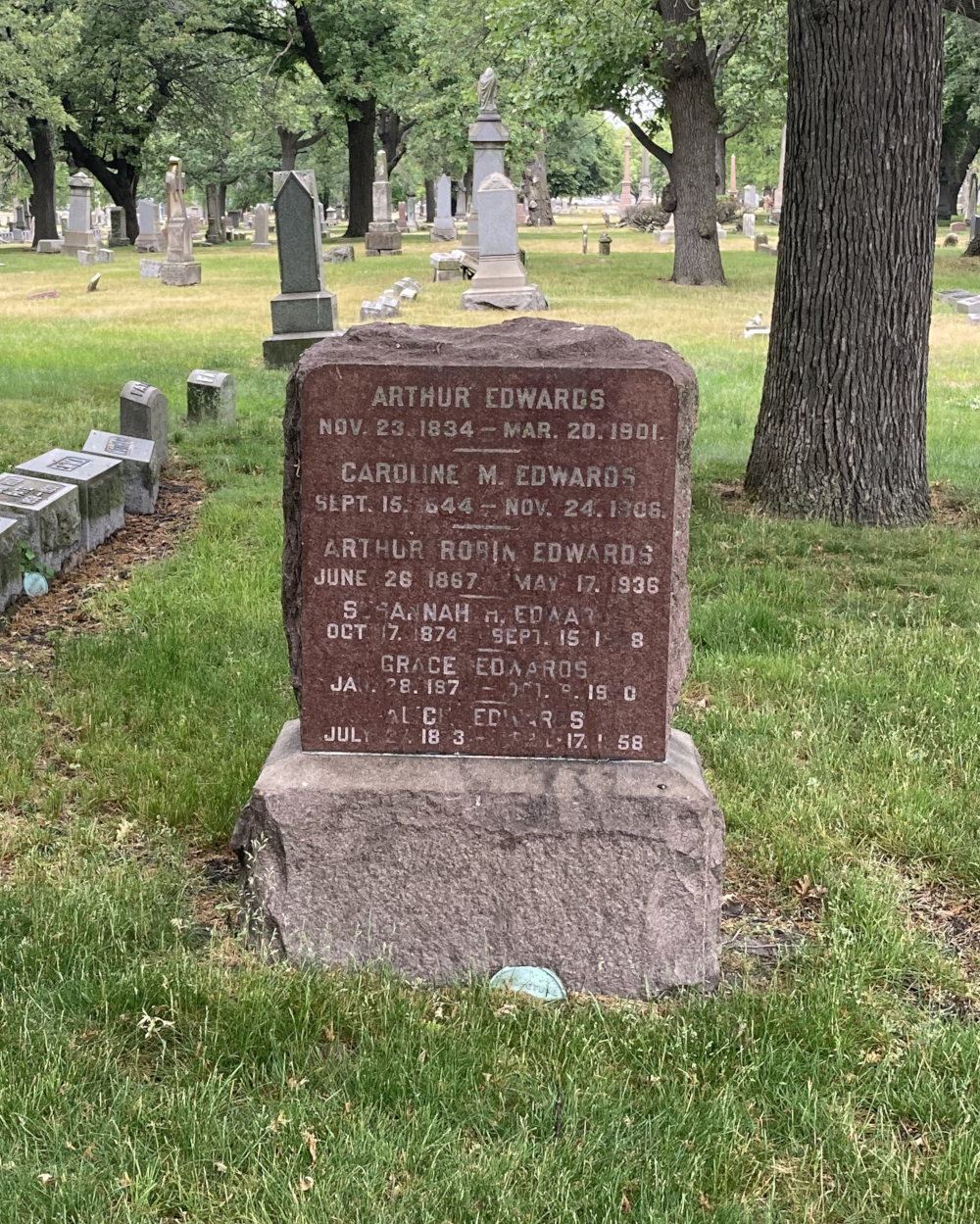
Edwards' grave at Rosehill Cemetery

He graduated from Ohio Wesleyan University in 1858 and entered the ministry in that same year. In the American Civil War, he served as chaplain of the First Michigan Infantry until after the Battle of Gettysburg. He participated in 18 battles all together and was offered a brevet rank of colonel. However, he resigned from the army and in 1864, he became assistant editor of the Northwestern Christian Advocate of Chicago, Illinois. From 1872 until his death, he was the editor.

He married Caroline Maria Whitehead on January 24, 1868, and they had three children.

He died at his home in Detroit on March 20, 1901. He was buried at Rosehill Cemetery in Chicago.
