= Hughie Tait =

Australian rules footballer

Personal information
- Full name: Hugh Albert Tait
- Born: 20 April 1892; Preston, Victoria
- Died: 30 July 1983 (aged 91); Forest Hill, Victoria
- Original team: Oakleigh

Playing career^{1}
Years	Club	Games (Goals)
1913	Essendon	8 (5)
- ^{1} Playing statistics correct to the end of 1913.

Hugh Albert Tait (20 April 1892 – 30 July 1983) was an Australian rules footballer who played with Essendon in the Victorian Football League (VFL).
