= Jay Edwards =

Jay Edwards may refer to:

- Jay Edwards (basketball) (born 1969), American basketball player
- Jay Wade Edwards (born 1968), American film director and editor
- Jay Edwards (politician), member of the Ohio House of Representatives

== See also ==
- Jason Edwards (disambiguation)
- Jaye Edwards
