= Arthur Edwards (rugby union) =

Wales international rugby union player

- Full name: Arthur Bernard Edwards
- Born: 7 October 1927 Bynea, Wales
- Died: 10 September 1984 (aged 56) Greenwich, England
- Occupation: Army colonel

Rugby union career
- Position: Fullback
International career
| Years | Team | Apps | (Points) |
| 1955 | Wales | 2 | (3) |

Arthur Bernard Edwards (7 October 1927 – 10 September 1984) was a Welsh international rugby union player.

Edwards was born in Bynea and raised in Ebbw Vale from the age of 10, attending Ebbw Vale Grammar School. He was a Welsh Schools representative player and made his senior debut for Ebbw Vale aged 16. After leaving school, Edwards studied teaching at Aberystwyth College and played for their XV.

Enlisting in the Army, Edwards was based out of England for much of his career, playing matches for Blackheath, Headingley and London Welsh. In 1951, Edwards featured in a combined county XV which played the touring Springboks. He was capped twice as a fullback for Wales in 1955 and had the distinction of kicking the winning points on debut against England at Cardiff, with his early penalty goal being the only score of the match.

Edwards was married to Clare Rowena Mordaunt, an aunty of politician Penny Mordaunt.

== See also ==
- List of Wales national rugby union players
