= Charles Henry Keyes =

American educator

1st President of Skidmore College
- In office 1912–1925
- Succeeded by: Henry T. Moore

1st President of Throop Polytechnic Institute
- In office 1891–1896
- Succeeded by: Walter Alison Edwards

Personal details
- Born: September 6, 1858
- Died: January 16, 1925 (aged 66)

Charles Henry Keyes (6 September 1858 – 16 January 1925), was an American educator. He was the first president of the Throop Polytechnic Institute (now Caltech) (1891–1896) and he became the first president of Skidmore College in 1912.

In 1911, Keyes wrote a well-received study on the progress of education in a New England school district. Keyes was already successful at Throop and Columbia University Teachers' College when Lucy Skidmore Scribner asked him to become Skidmore's first president. In 1922, Skidmore was chartered. Keyes helped define the school as a liberal arts college with a successful nursing program. He also assisted with the college's acquisition of additional property. Skidmore College have named the Keyes Quadrangle after him. He is the subject of a biography by Maud Keyes Decker (ISBN 143255882X).
