= Jason Edwards =

Jason Edwards may refer to:

- Jason Edwards (musician), English musician with Wolfsbane
- Jason Edwards (rugby league) (1969/1970–2022), Australian rugby league footballer
- Jason Edwards (speedway rider) (born 2002), British speedway rider
- Jason Edwards (basketball) (born 2003), American basketball player

== See also ==
- Jay Edwards (disambiguation)
