= Hugh Edwards =

Hugh Edwards may refer to:

- Hugh Edwards (author) (1878–1952), English author, All Night at Mr Stanyhurst’s
- Hugh Edwards (curator) (1903–1986), American curator of photography in Chicago
- Hugh Edwards (rower) (1906–1972), English Olympic rower
- Hugh Edwards (journalist) (1932–2024), Western Australian author and marine photographer
- J. Hugh Edwards (1869–1945), British Liberal Party politician

== See also ==
- Hughie Edwards (1914–1982), Australian Victoria Cross recipient
- Huw Edwards (disambiguation)
