= Don Edwards (disambiguation) =

Don Edwards (1915–2015) was a U.S. representative from California.

Don or Donald Edwards may also refer to:

- Don Edwards (cowboy singer) (1939–2022), American singer and guitarist
- Don Edwards (ice hockey) (born 1955), Canadian ice hockey player
- Don C. Edwards (1861–1938), American politician
- Donald E. Edwards (1937–2018), American state military officer
- Donald Anderson Edwards (1905–1999), American physicist
- Donnie Edwards (born 1973), American football linebacker

== See also ==
- Don Edwards San Francisco Bay National Wildlife Refuge
