= Colley Gate =

Coordinates: 52°27′35″N 2°5′10″W

Colley Gate is an area within Cradley and also a road in Cradley in Halesowen, England. Colley Gate is the name of the road between Windmill Hill and Greenways part of the A458 road connecting Halesowen with Stourbridge.
