= Gareth Edwards (Welsh cricketer) =

Welsh cricketer

Personal information
- Full name: Gareth John Maldwyn Edwards
- Born: 13 November 1976 (age 49); St Asaph, Flintshire, England
- Batting: Right-handed
- Bowling: Right-arm off break

Domestic team information
- Years: Team
- 1998: Wales Minor Counties
- 1997: Glamorgan

Career statistics
Competition	First-class
Matches	1
Runs scored	–
Batting average	–
100s/50s	–/–
Top score	–
Balls bowled	54
Wickets	–
Bowling average	–
5 wickets in innings	–
10 wickets in match	–
Best bowling	–
Catches/stumpings	–/–
- Source: Cricinfo, 13 May 2011

Gareth John Maldwyn Edwards (born 13 November 1976) is a former Welsh cricketer. Edwards was a right-handed batsman who bowled right-arm off break. He was born in St Asaph, Flintshire. He studied geography at University College London.

Edwards played a single Youth Test for England Under-19s against Zimbabwe Under-19s on England's tour of Zimbabwe in 1995/96. Having played in the Glamorgan Second XI since 1994, Edwards made his only first-class appearance for Glamorgan against Oxford University in 1997. In this match he did not bat in either Glamorgan innings, while with the ball he bowled 9 wicket-less overs.

In 1998, he made 2 Minor Counties Championship appearances for Wales Minor Counties against Shropshire and Cornwall, and a single MCCA Knockout Trophy appearance against Hertfordshire. Following the end of his cricket career, he moved to Manchester where he worked for the BBC as a researcher for A Question of Sport.
