= Richard Edwards =

Richard Edwards may refer to:

== Arts and entertainment ==
- Richard Edwardes (1525–1566), English poet, dramatist and composer, alleged illegitimate son of Henry VIII of England
- Richard Edwards (musician), freelance trombone player and composer
- Richard Edwards, lead singer and songwriter of the band Margot & the Nuclear So and So's
- Richey Edwards, missing songwriter and rhythm guitarist of Welsh band the Manic Street Preachers
- Dickon Edwards (born 1971), diarist and front man of the band Fosca
- Richie Edwards (born 1974), latter-day bassist for The Darkness
- Rick Edwards (born 1979), British TV presenter

== Military ==
- Richard Edwards (Royal Navy officer, died 1773), commodore for the Canadian province of Newfoundland and Labrador for 1745
- Richard Edwards (Royal Navy officer, died 1795) (c. 1715–1795), commodore for the Canadian province of Newfoundland and Labrador for 1757 and again in 1779
- Richard S. Edwards (1885–1956), United States Navy admiral
  - USS Richard S. Edwards, a Forrest Sherman-class destroyer

== Politics ==
- Richard M. Edwards (1822–1907), member of the Tennessee House of Representatives, 1861–1862
- Richard Edwards (educator) (1822–1908), Welsh American superintendent and college president
- Richard Edwards (Australian politician) (1842–1915), member of the Australian Parliament, 1901–1913
- Richard Edwards (Welsh politician) (born 1956), former Welsh Labour politician

== Sports ==
- Dick Edwards (basketball) (1930–1981), American basketball coach
- Dick Edwards (footballer) (1942–2025), English footballer
- Richard Edwards (footballer) (born 1983), Jamaican footballer
- Prof Edwards (Richard Martin Edwards, born 1940), cricketer from Barbados

== Others ==
- Richard Edwards (fashion company), a New York fashion design company
- Richard Edwards (professor), an American economist and author
- Richard Lawrence Edwards, American geochemist
