= Gareth Edwards (Berkshire cricketer) =

English cricketer

Gareth Edwards (born 30 November 1973) was an English cricketer who played for Berkshire. He was born in Exeter.

Having represented Berkshire in the Minor Counties Championship between 1997 and 2001, Edwards made a single List A appearance for the team, in the 1999 NatWest Trophy, against Devon. From the tailend, Edwards scored 5 runs, and took bowling figures of 0–30 from six overs of bowling. Edwards turned to golf in 2005 and quickly became a single-figure handicap player at Caversham Heath Golf Club where he held the white tee course record amongst members of 72 (1 under gross). He now plays at Sonning Golf Club
