= Arthur Edwards (priest) =

Irish Anglican priest

Arthur William Edwards (b Dublin 1 July 1818 - d Cork 27 March 1874) was a nineteenth century Anglican priest.

Edwards was educated at Kilkenny College and Trinity College, Dublin, graduating BA in 1814 and Master of Arts in 1840. He was ordained in 1842 and began his career with curacies at Roscrea, Powerscourt and Limerick. He was Archdeacon of Derry from 1855 until 1860; He was Rector of Tamlaght Finlagan from 1860 to 1869; and Dean of Cork from 1869 until his death.
