= Eliza Edwards =

Human computer (1779–1846)

Eliza Edwards (1779–1846) was a human computer and daughter of Mary Edwards.

== Early life and education ==
Edwards was born in Ludlow to Mary and John Edwards.

== Career ==
Eliza was a human computer who took on the job of her mother Mary Edwards, working on the Nautical Almanac. She lost her job in 1829, during the formation of the Nautical Almanac Office. She was paid by the Board of Longitude.
