= Robert Edwards =

Robert, Rob, Bob or Bobby Edwards may refer to:

== Sport ==
- Rob Edwards (footballer, born 1970), English footballer formerly of Huddersfield Town
- Rob Edwards (footballer, born 1973), Wales international footballer who played for Carlisle, Bristol City, Preston, Blackpool and Exeter
- Robert Edwards (gridiron football) (born 1974), American football player for the New England Patriots and Toronto Argonauts
- Rob Edwards (footballer, born 1982), Wales international footballer who played for Aston Villa, Wolves, Blackpool and Barnsley
- Bobby Edwards (soccer) (born 1995), American soccer player
- Rob Edwards (basketball) (born 1997), American basketball player
- Robert Edwards (cricketer) (1828–1899), English cricketer and clergyman

== Entertainment, journalism, and broadcasting ==
- Bob Edwards (satirist) (1860–1922), Canadian founder of the Calgary Eye Opener weekly newspaper
- Robert Edwards (artist) (1879–1948), American illustrator, musician, and writer
- Bob Edwards (British journalist) (1925–2012), British journalist
- Bobby Edwards (1926–2012), American country musician
- Bob Edwards (1947–2024), American radio broadcaster
- Rob Edwards (actor) (born 1949), British actor
- Rob Edwards (screenwriter) (born 1963), American screenwriter

== Academia and science ==
- Bob Edwards (anthropologist) (1930-2023), Australian anthropologist and museum curator, instigator of the Migration Museum, Adelaide
- Robert Dudley Edwards (1909–1988), Irish historian
- Robert Edwards (physiologist) (1925–2013), British scientist, IVF pioneer, and Nobel Laureate in Physiology
- Robert Edmund Edwards (1926–2000), Australian mathematician, usually cited simply as R. E. Edwards
- Robert H. Edwards (1935–2025), American president of Carleton College and Bowdoin College

== Politics ==
- Bob Edwards (politician) (1905–1990), British trade unionist and member of parliament for Bilston and Wolverhampton South East
- F. Robert Edwards (born 1940), member of the Michigan House of Representatives

== Others ==
- Robert Edwards (pirate) (died c. 1738), Welsh buccaneer, landowner of 77 acres of Manhattan real estate bequeathed in 1778
- Rob Edwards, African-American man lynched during the 1912 racial conflict in Forsyth County, Georgia
- Robert Mark Edwards (born 1961), American murderer

== See also ==
- Bert Edwards (disambiguation)
