= Michael Edwards =

Michael or Mike Edwards may refer to:

== Sports ==
=== American football ===
- Mike Edwards (linebacker) (born 1957), American football player
- Mike Edwards (cornerback) (born 1991), American NFL football player formerly of the New York Jets
- Mike Edwards (safety) (born 1996), American NFL football player for the Kansas City Chiefs

=== Association football (soccer) ===
- Mike Edwards (footballer, born 1974), English footballer for Tranmere Rovers
- Mike Edwards (footballer, born 1980), English footballer for Notts County F.C.
- Michael Edwards (soccer) (born 2000), American soccer player
- Michael Edwards (football executive) (born 1979), English sporting director of Liverpool FC

=== Other sports ===
- Mike Edwards (basketball) (born 1950), American basketball player
- Mike Edwards (cricketer) (born 1940), English cricketer
- Mike Edwards (second baseman) (1952–2026), American Major League Baseball player
- Mike Edwards (motorcyclist) (born 1962), British motorcycle racer
- Eddie the Eagle (Michael Edwards, born 1963), British ski-jumper
- Mike Edwards (pole vaulter) (born 1968), British pole vaulter
- Mike Edwards (rugby league) (born 1974), Welsh rugby league footballer
- Mike Edwards (third baseman) (born 1976), American Major League Baseball player
- Mike Edwards (high jumper) (born 1990), British-Nigerian high jumper
- Mike Edwards (swimmer) (born 1938), Welsh swimmer

== Musicians ==
- Michael Edwards (American composer) (1893–1962), American composer and musician
- Michael Edwards (British composer) (born 1968), British composer
- Mike Edwards (musician) (1948–2010), cellist of the band Electric Light Orchestra

== Academics ==
- Michael Edwards (international development specialist) (born 1957), British academic
- Michael Edwards (literary scholar) (born 1938), British professor of English at the Collège de France

== Others ==
- Michael Edwards (actor) (born 1944), American actor
- Michael Edwards (art therapist) (1930–2010), painter and art therapist
- Michael Edwards (fragrance expert) (born 1943), developer of the fragrance wheel and publisher of Fragrances of the World
- Mike Edwards (Scottish journalist), with Scotland Today
- Mike Edwards (American journalist) (1931–2016), editor with National Geographic
- Mickey Edwards (born 1937), former Republican congressman

== See also ==
- Sir Michael Edwardes (1930–2019), South African business executive
