= Justin Edwards =

Justin Edwards may refer to:

- Justin Edwards (actor) (born 1972), English actor and writer
- Justin D. Edwards (born 1970), Canadian professor in the Department of English at University of Surrey
- Justin Edwards (fighter) (born 1983), American mixed martial artist
- Justin Edwards (basketball, born 1992), Canadian professional basketball player
- Justin Edwards (basketball, born 2003), American basketball player
