= Mary Dorothy Edwards =

New Zealand architect

- Born: 7 February 1909; Rhodesia
- Died: 7 September 1995 (aged 86); Nelson, New Zealand
- Education: Bachelor of Architecture, University of Auckland 1932-1938
- Occupation: Architect
- Practice: Public Works Department

Mary Dorothy Edwards was a New Zealand architect, working primarily as a government architect in Auckland. She was the third woman to graduate from the University of Auckland School of Architecture.

== Biography ==
Mary Dorothy Edwards was born in Rhodesia on 7 February 1909, where her father worked as a mining engineer. She returned to New Zealand after her father's death at the age of 17, settling in Dunedin. Edwards had a brother who studied at Lincoln College.

In Dunedin Edwards worked for architect Eric Miller to gain her testimonials of study but the training was disrupted by the Depression.

Edwards enrolled in the University of Auckland School of Architecture in 1932, graduating in 1938-1939. There were only five people in her class and she became the third woman to graduate with a Bachelor of Architecture in New Zealand. She was awarded the Amalgamated Brick Prize by the School of Architecture in 1934 for the best design in brick.

Edwards took unpaid work with Charles Toole and Robert MacLaurin to complete her required hours for the Bachelor of Architecture. After graduation she found employment with the Public Works Department in the architectural Division. For six years Edwards worked on military projects for New Zealand and American forces. She designed naval and military barracks, camps, gunposts, lookouts, bomb depots and hospitals.

Edwards became registered by the NZIA in 1940, following a nomination by Basil Hooper. This also allowed her to gain membership to the Royal Institute of British Architects.

Edwards worked at the Public Works Department until 1954, when she moved to Auckland practice Gummer & Ford for seven years . Edwards also worked at the Education Board before returning to work at the Public Works Department (later called Ministry of Works) in 1964. She was placed in the housing division of the Ministry of Works, designing state houses in Northcote. Edwards transferred to the architectural division in 1970, designing the Whangarei Health Camp.

She was well known for her intricate pencil drawings and a large collection of her drawings are held at the University of Auckland.

Edwards retired in August 1974 and moved to Nelson. She was an active member of the local NZIA branch in her retirement. Edwards died in 1995.
