= James Edwards =

James, Jim, or Jimmy Edwards may refer to:

== Politicians ==
- J. Fred Edwards (James Frederick Edwards, 1902–1978), Canadian politician
- James B. Edwards (1927–2014), American politician
- James Bevan Edwards (1835–1922), British politician and army general
- James Edwards (Los Angeles politician), member of the Los Angeles, California, Common Council
- James T. Edwards (1838–1914), American educator, Methodist minister, and politician
- Jim Edwards (Canadian politician) (born 1936), Canadian politician
- Jim Edwards (New Zealand politician) (1927–2010), New Zealand politician
- Jim Edwards (political activist) (1892–1952), New Zealand socialist, communist, political activist, and salesman
- Jim Edwards (Queensland politician) (1879–1952), member of the Queensland Legislative Assembly

== Sportspeople ==
- James Edwards (basketball) (born 1955), former NBA basketball player
- Jim Joe Edwards (1894–1965), American baseball player
- Jim Edwards (footballer, born 1874) (1874–?), Welsh footballer
- Jimmy Edwards (gridiron football) (1952–2002), Canadian gridiron football player
- Jimmy Edwards (footballer, born 1905) (1905–1982), English footballer with West Bromwich Albion F.C.
- Jimmy Edwards (rugby league) (1926–2015), New Zealand rugby league international

== Other ==
- Agent J (James Darrell Edwards III), a fictional character from Men in Black
- James Edwards (actor) (1918–1970), American film actor
- James L. Edwards (actor) (born 1972), American actor, screenwriter, and filmmaker
- James Edwards (bookseller) (1757–1816), English bookseller and bibliographer
- James Francis Edwards (1921–2022), Canadian fighter pilot and ace during World War II
- James L. Edwards (academic administrator), president of Anderson University in Indiana
- James R. Edwards (born 1945), American New Testament scholar
- James F. Edwards (1910–1991), American businessman and philanthropist
- James Edwards (character), a fictional character on One Tree Hill
- Jimmy Edwards (1920–1988), English comedian
- Jimmy Edwards (musician) (1949–2015), British musician
- Jimmie M. Edwards (born 1955), Missouri judge political appointee
- James Edwards, American political activist and host of The Political Cesspool radio program
