= Ada Mae Edwards =

- Speaker for St. Kitts
- Born: 19 June 1911; Antigua
- Died: 2004 (aged 92–93)
- Occupation: teacher
- Known for: First woman Speaker
- Spouse: Walter Edwards

Ada Mae Edwards (19 June 1911 – 2004) was the first woman Speaker of the St. Kitts National Assembly.

== Life ==
Edwards was born in Antigua in 1911. She trained as a teacher at the college on her island and in 1930 she came to St. Kitts. She worked as an assistant teacher and in her spare time she helped the Girl Guides. She was promoted until in 1941 she was headmistress to a school in Dieppe Bay.

In 1948 she undertook more training in Port of Spain and on her return she became the supervising teacher for the island of Nevis.

In 1959 she led a programme in St. Kitts to alleviate the high rate of unemployment. It was her task to train people for domestic service. By this means unemployed people obtained work abroad in Canada. Later in 1966 she was supervising the teaching of domestic science on the island of St. Kitts. In that year she was made a Member of the Order of the British Empire.

Edwards was politically active and she became the executive officer of the St. Kitts-Nevis Trades and Labour Union in 1972. She was allowed to represent the Labour Party and she was elected to be the Speaker of St. Kitts Assembly. She became the first woman speaker in 1978 in Saint Kitts and Nevis. She died in 2004. In 2011 she was one of the women chosen to be honoured in an exhibition to celebrate International Women's Day.
