= John C. Edwards =

American politician (1804–1888)

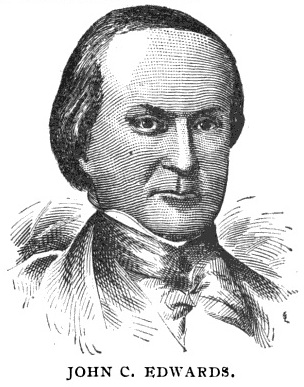

9th Governor of Missouri
- In office November 20, 1844 – November 20, 1848
- Lieutenant: James Young
- Preceded by: Meredith M. Marmaduke
- Succeeded by: Austin A. King

Member of the U.S. House of Representatives from Missouri's at-large district
- In office March 4, 1841 – March 3, 1843
- Preceded by: John Jameson
- Succeeded by: John Jameson

6th and 8th Secretary of State of Missouri
- In office 1837
- Governor: John Miller
- Preceded by: Henry Shurlds
- Succeeded by: Peter Garland Glover
- In office December 8, 1830 – 1835
- Governor: John Miller; Daniel Dunklin
- Preceded by: Priestly H. McBride
- Succeeded by: Peter Garland Glover

Member of the Missouri House of Representatives
- In office 1836

2nd Mayor of Stockton, California
- In office 1851–1852
- Preceded by: Samuel Purdy
- Succeeded by: William Baker

Personal details
- Born: June 24, 1804 Frankfort, Kentucky
- Died: October 14, 1888 (aged 84) Stockton, California
- Resting place: Stockton Rural cemetery
- Party: Democratic
- Spouse: Emma Jeanne Catherine Richard
- Children: Eleven, including Emma Edwards Green
- Education: Black's College
- Profession: Attorney

John Cummins Edwards (June 24, 1804 – October 14, 1888) was a Democratic politician from the state of Missouri. He served as a member of the 27th United States Congress as well as the ninth governor of Missouri.

== Early life ==
John Cummins Edwards was born on June 24, 1804 or 1806 (Conflicting sources list each) in Frankfort, Kentucky to parents John and Sarah (Cummins) Edwards. He was raised in the Murfreesboro, Tennessee area and completed preparatory education at Black's College in Kentucky. He studied law at Dr Henderson's Classic School in Rutherford County, Tennessee and further studied under the Rutherford County states attorney before being admitted to the Tennessee Bar in 1825.

== Career ==
After working as an attorney in his native Murfreesboro for three years, John Edwards moved to Missouri in 1828, establishing a law practice in Jefferson City and becoming involved in local politics. In 1830 Missouri Governor John G. Miller appointed Edwards as Secretary of State, a position he would hold until 1835, and then again briefly in 1837. While in this office, he supervised his younger brother, Edward Livingston Edwards, in the study of law. In a move that would seem unusual by today's standards, Edwards also concurrently held the post of district judge of Cole County, Missouri from 1832 to 1837. Politically John Edwards was a Jacksonian democrat and a staunch ally of Missouri Senator Thomas Hart Benton. In 1836 Edwards was elected to the Missouri House of Representatives but would serve only briefly as in 1837 he was appointed a judge to the Missouri Supreme Court, a position he would hold until 1839.

John Edwards entered national politics in 1841 after being elected to the 27th United States Congress, serving one term until March 1843. While in the U.S. House of Representatives he worked on several key issues of importance to Missouri, such as opposing the Tariff of 1842 and helping block Federal settlement of the Missouri-Iowa border dispute, a.k.a. the Honey War. Congressman Edwards chose against seeking a second term in Washington D.C., instead setting his sights on the Missouri Governors mansion. In the election of 1844 John C. Edwards narrowly defeated Democrat-turned-Whig candidate Charles H. Allen to become Missouri's 9th Governor.

=== As Governor ===
John C. Edwards oversaw a time of great change and expansion while Missouri Governor. During his tenure nineteen new counties were created in the state. Technology advanced when the telegraph system reached St. Louis and the chartering of the states first railroad, the Hannibal and St. Joseph Railroad happened. Edwards was a wartime governor as well. With the nation embroiled in the Mexican–American War, Edwards oversaw the creation of the Missouri Mounted Volunteers under Alexander William Doniphan, a unit that served with distinction in the conflict. Another war, the Honey War, was finally settled under Governor Edwards leadership as Missouri agreed to arbitration of the border dispute with Iowa. Among his other accomplishments were creation of the Missouri state hospital for the mentally ill in Fulton, a new tax system that took the state from a deficit to a surplus, and approval of a tax to establish a free normal school at the University of Missouri.

Governor Edwards time in power was not free of disappointments however. The Missouri legislature, considering his expenses excessive, refused to reimburse him for renovations and upkeep of the Governors mansion. Further, he was chastised for traveling to New Orleans, Louisiana to sell bonds for the state. In a final insult, a grand jury in St. Louis announced publicly their displeasure with his administrations' "too free use of the pardoning power" for freeing over fifty criminals, including three abolitionists who had attempted to free slaves in the state. John Cummins Edwards left the governors office a bitter man, stating "The governorship is a despicable office for any man to be condemned to hold. Two of my predecessors resigned before their terms were out and a third committed suicide."

== Later life ==
John Edwards didn't stay in Missouri long after leaving office. Within months he had organized a stock train headed for the California gold fields. He became a prosperous rancher and merchant after settling in the Stockton area. Edwards would return briefly to politics in 1851, being elected Stockton's mayor. A bachelor to this point, Edwards finally married in 1854. He and his wife, the former Emma Jeanne Catherine Richard of New Orleans, would parent eleven children. John Cummins Edwards died on either September 17 or October 14, 1888 (again, sources list conflicting dates) in Stockton, California and is buried in the Rural Cemetery there.

Party political offices
Preceded by Thomas Reynolds	Democratic nominee for Governor of Missouri; 1844	Succeeded by Austin Augustus King
Political offices
Preceded by Henry Shurlds	Missouri Secretary of State; 1837	Succeeded by Peter Garland Glover
Preceded by Meredith M. Marmaduke	Governor of Missouri; 1844–1848	Succeeded by Austin A. King
U.S. House of Representatives
Preceded by John Jameson	Member of the U.S. House of Representatives from Missouri's at-large congressional district 1841–1843	Succeeded by John Jameson
