= Arthur Edwards (antiquary) =

English army officer and antiquary

Arthur Edwards (died 1743) was an English army officer and antiquary.

Edwards, for many years the archaeological ally of Dr. Stukeley and Lord Winchilsea, was elected a fellow of the Society of Antiquaries on 17 November 1725. He died first major of the 2nd Troop of Horse Guards in Grosvenor Street, London, 22 June 1743. His will of 11 June 1738 was proved at London 13 July 1743, a second grant being made 7 November 1745. Therein he refers to his family merely as 'my brothers and sisters, the children of my father.'

The fire of 23 October 1731, by which the Cotton Library was seriously damaged, induced Edwards to make a gift of £7,000 to the trustees 'to erect and build such a house as may be most likely to presence that library as much as can be from all accidents.' Owing, however, to the protraction of a life interest in the legacy, it did not become available until other arrangements had made its application to building purposes needless. It was consequently, in pursuance of the testator's contingent instructions, appropriated to the purchase of 'such manuscripts, books of antiquities, ancient coins, medals, and other curiosities as might be worthy to increase and enlarge the said Cotton Library.' Edwards also bequeathed about two thousand volumes of printed books and their cases; also, his 'pictures of King George the 1st, the Czar Peter, Oliver Cromwell, and Cosimo di Medicis the 1st, with his secretary, Bartolomeo Concini... to be placed in the aforesaid library.'
