= Eric Edwards =

Eric Edwards may refer to:

- Eric Edwards (actor) (born 1945), American former adult film star
- Eric Edwards (American football) (born 1980), National Football League tight end
- Eric Edwards, Baron Chelmer (1914–1997), British Conservative party activist
- Eric Edwards (Neighbours), fictional character from the Australian soap opera Neighbours
- Eric Edwards Jr. (born 2000), American hurdler
