= Arthur Edwards (footballer, born 1915) =

Australian rules footballer (1915–2002)

Personal information
- Full name: Albert Arthur Edwards
- Nickname: Titch
- Born: 20 August 1915; Ascot Vale, Victoria
- Died: 15 October 2002 (aged 87)
- Original team: Laygols
- Height: 168 cm (5 ft 6 in)
- Weight: 75 kg (165 lb)
- Position: Rover

Playing career^{1}
Years	Club	Games (Goals)
1936–40, 1944–45	Fitzroy	36 (22)

Coaching career
Years	Club	Games (W–L–D)
1961	Fitzroy	1 (1–0–0)
- ^{1} Playing statistics correct to the end of 1945.

Albert Arthur "Titch" Edwards (20 August 1915 – 15 October 2002) was an Australian rules footballer who played for Fitzroy in the Victorian Football League (VFL).

Edwards, nicknamed Titch, played originally at Laygols before he arrived at Fitzroy in 1936. His appearances were limited and only in 1938 was he a regular in the side.

He became coach of Tasmanian club New Norfolk in 1947.

Later, Edwards joined the Fitzroy coaching staff and in the 1961 VFL season filled in as senior coach, due to the absence of Len Smith, steering the club to a win over Carlton.
