= Mary Edwards (human computer) =

British mathematician and astronomer

Mary Edwards (c. 1750 – September 1815) was a human computer for the British Nautical Almanac and one of a very few women paid directly by the Board of Longitude, and to earn a living from scientific work at the time.

She was one of 35 human computers who calculated the position of the Sun, Moon and planets at different times of day for annual nautical almanacs used for navigation at sea.

== Work ==
Edwards was introduced to the British Nautical Almanac project and to Nevil Maskelyne, the fifth English Astronomer Royal, through her clergyman husband the Revd. John Edwards (c. 1748–1784). He had taken on piece-work as a computer to supplement the family income, and received payment for work on 6 months' worth of each almanac from 1773 until his death in 1784. It was revealed that Mary had done most of the calculations when she wrote to Maskelyne to ask if she could continue the work to support herself and her daughters after her husband's death. On her husband's death, Mary Edwards officially took over his computing work on a full-time basis. It was her sole source of income. Maskelyne may have known all along that she undertook the calculations because he had visited the family on several occasions. However, when Maskelyne died in 1811, she found that the new Astronomer Royal John Pond did not give her enough work. The Board of Longitude eventually ruled that Pond should continue to allocate work to her. Over time, her reputation for reliability and accuracy meant she could take on more work. She continued until her death in 1815.

== Family ==
Mary Edwards' daughter, Eliza Edwards (1779–1846), also worked as a computer, initially helping from a young age and then independently after her mother's death in 1815. She continued to work for the Nautical Almanac until 1832, at which date computing work was centralised in London. In the new HM Nautical Almanac Office there was no place for women employees as Civil Service rules made the employment of women very difficult.

== Recognition ==
The minor planet 12627 Maryedwards was named in her honour.

In 2016 Ludlow Civic Society decided to put a Blue Plaque on her former home in 4 Brand Lane, Ludlow, Shropshire, in recognition of her services as the first female "computer".

== See also ==
- List of female mathematicians
- Women in computing
- Women in the workforce
- History of science
