= Ryan Edwards =

Ryan Edwards may refer to:

- Ryan Edwards (American soccer) (born 1976), retired American soccer defender
- Ryan Edwards (Australian soccer) (born 1993), Australian soccer midfielder
- Ryan Edwards (English footballer) (born 1993), English football defender
- Ryan Edwards (rugby union) (born 1990), English rugby union player
- Ryan Edwards (musician), former drummer with The Lines
- Ryan Edwards (baritone) (1941-2026), American operatic baritone
