= Sarah Edwards (American politician) =

American politician (born 1953)

Sarah Edwards (born January 31, 1953) is a Vermont consultant and former member of the Vermont House of Representatives from Brattleboro. She is a member of the Vermont Progressive Party.

She was first elected in 2002, and in 2012 announced that she would not seek re-election, wishing instead to concentrate on her family foundation, the Lighthouse Reef Conservation Institute. She endorsed chef-restaurateur Tristan Toleno as her successor. Toleno did win as a Democrat in the reapportioned district.

She is a former Vice-Chair of the Select Board of Brattleboro.
