= Kyle Edwards =

Kyle Edwards may refer to:

- Arda Ocal (born 1981), Canadian former professional wrestler who used the stage name Kyle Edwards
- Kyle Edwards (footballer, born 1997), Saint Vincent and the Grenadines footballer
- Kyle Edwards (footballer, born 1998), English footballer
- Kyle Edwards (writer), Anishinaabe writer from Canada,
- Kyle Edwards, a fictional character from the film Road Trip
