= Gareth Evans (geneticist) =

British medical geneticist (born 1959)

Gareth Evans MBE FRCP FLSW FRCOG
- Born: Dafydd Gareth Richard Evans; May 1959 (age 67)
- Education: St Mary's Hospital Medical School; University of Manchester
- Known for: Research in inherited cancer syndromes and NF2-related schwannomatosis
- Awards: Fellow of the Learned Society of Wales (2020)
- Scientific career
- Fields: Medical genetics, cancer epidemiology
- Workplaces: University of Manchester; Manchester University Hospitals NHS Foundation Trust; The Christie NHS Foundation Trust

Dafydd Gareth Richard Evans (born May 1959) is a British medical geneticist specialising in cancer genetics and neurofibromatosis type 2 (NF2-related schwannomatosis). He is an Emeritus Professor of Medical Genetics and Cancer Epidemiology at the University of Manchester and was a Consultant in Medical Genetics and Cancer Epidemiology with Manchester University Hospitals NHS Foundation Trust and The Christie NHS Foundation Trust.

== Academic and clinical career ==
Following his MD, Evans was appointed Senior Clinical Research Fellow at the University of Manchester. He later became Honorary Professor of Medical Genetics at the University of Manchester and has held consultant appointments in Medical Genetics and Cancer Epidemiology with Manchester University Hospitals NHS Foundation Trust and The Christie NHS Foundation Trust.

Evans served as Chair of the National Institute for Clinical Excellence (NICE) Familial Breast Cancer Guideline Development Group from 2002 to 2010 and subsequently acted as Clinical Lead for the guideline programme.

From 2009, he acted as Chief Investigator for National Institute for Health Research (NIHR)-funded research programmes focused on breast cancer risk prediction. He is a two-term NIHR Senior Investigator (emeritus).

== NF2-related schwannomatosis ==
Evans has conducted clinical and research work in NF2-related schwannomatosis. In 2009, NHS England commissioned a Highly Specialised Service for neurofibromatosis type 2 across specialist centres in England.

== Publications ==
Evans has published extensively in the fields of cancer genetics, inherited disease, and genetic epidemiology. His research output includes peer-reviewed journal articles, reviews, and book chapters indexed in major academic databases including ORCID and Scopus.

He was co-editor of Risk Assessment and Management in Cancer Genetics (Oxford University Press, 2005), edited alongside Fiona Lalloo, Bronwyn Kerr, and Jan M. Friedman.

== Awards and honours ==
- Elected a Fellow of the Learned Society of Wales in 2020.
- Recipient of the Basser BRCA Impact Award in 2024.
- Recipient of the Children’s Tumor Foundation Friedrich von Recklinghausen Award in 2014.
