= Teddy Edwards (singer-songwriter) =

American singer-songwriter

- Born: Edward Friedman; June 24, 1999 (age 26); New York, New York, U.S.
- Genres: R&B; pop
- Occupations: Singer; songwriter; record producer; musician; multi-instrumentalist
- Instruments: Vocals; guitar; piano; keyboards; synthesizers; bass; drums; percussion
- Years active: 2016–present
- Website: www.teddyedwardsmusic.com

Edward Friedman (born 24 June 1999), known professionally as Teddy Edwards, is an American singer, songwriter, producer, musician, multi-instrumentalist, and record producer.

== Early life ==
Born in New York City, he began piano lessons in 2003 at four, followed by guitar, and has been writing songs since he was nine.

== Career ==
Edwards released his debut single in 2016, "My Name", which he co-wrote in 2014 with Sabrina Teitelbaum and was produced in 2015 by Phredley Brown. The music video for "My Name," directed by Chris Zino premiered on January 19, 2017.

In 2016, Edwards began work on his forthcoming LP with mix engineer Andrew Wuepper, known for his work with Frank Ocean, Rihanna, and Justin Bieber. Edwards has co-produced with producers such as The Agency, consisting of Mike Molina and Nelson Kyle who have credited works with artists such as Nas, 2 Chainz, Young Thug, Meek Mill, Ciara, and John Legend.

On June 16, 2017, Edwards released the first single off his debut studio album, "Always Be There", which he wrote and was co-produced with The Agency. The song received positive critical acclaim, and was labelled "a mellow pop affair" by Cailey Lindberg of Earmilk.
