= Alan Edwards =

Alan Edwards may refer to:

- Alan Edwards (actor) (1925–2003), British-Australian actor
- Alan Edwards (canoeist) (1943–2002), British Olympic sprint canoer
- Alan Edwards (rugby) (fl. 1930s), Welsh rugby union and rugby league footballer
- Alan Edwards (diplomat), Australian High Commissioner to Vanuatu from 1996 to 1999

== See also ==
- Allan Edwards (disambiguation)
- Allen Edwards (disambiguation)
- Al Edwards (disambiguation)
