= Huw Edwards (disambiguation) =

Huw Edwards (born 1961) is a Welsh journalist, presenter and newsreader.

Huw Edwards may also refer to:

- Huw T. Edwards (1892–1970), Welsh trade union leader and politician
- Huw Edwards (politician) (born 1953), British Member of Parliament for Monmouth
- Huw Edwards (conductor) (fl. 1995–2020), Welsh conductor
- Huw Edwards (EastEnders), a fictional character on the TV soap (1996–1999)

== See also ==
- Hugh Edwards (disambiguation)
