= Paul Edwards =

Paul Edwards may refer to:

== Sports ==
- Paul Edwards (footballer, born 1947), English footballer who played for Manchester United, Oldham Athletic, and Stockport County
- Paul Edwards (shot putter) (born 1959), Welsh shot putter
- Paul Edwards (footballer, born 1963), English footballer who played for West Brom and Wolves
- Paul Edwards (footballer, born 1965), English footballer who played for Crewe and Shrewsbury
- Paul Edwards (footballer, born 1980), English footballer
- Paul Edwards (footballer, born 1982), former English footballer for Crewe Alexandra
- Paul Edwards (boxer) (born 1986), English flyweight boxer

== Other people ==
- Paul Edwards (composer) (born 1955), English composer and organist
- Paul S. Edwards, American editor with the Deseret News
- Paul Edwards (literary scholar) (1926–1992), British literary historian
- Paul Edwards (philosopher) (1923–2004), Austrian-American philosopher
- Paul Edwards (politician) (born 1961), politician in Manitoba, Canada
