= Alex Edwards (cricketer) =

English cricketer (born 1975)

Personal information
- Full name: Alexander David Edwards
- Born: 2 August 1975 (age 51); Cuckfield, Sussex, England
- Batting: Right-handed
- Bowling: Right-arm fast-medium

Domestic team information
- Years: Team
- 1994–1999: Sussex
- 2001: Derbyshire

Career statistics
Competition	First-class	LA
Matches	16	37
Runs scored	183	186
Batting average	8.31	9.30
100s/50s	–/–	–/–
Top score	23	43
Balls bowled	1,700	1,496
Wickets	26	26
Bowling average	42.65	48.00
5 wickets in innings	1	–
10 wickets in match	–	–
Best bowling	5/34	3/34
Catches/stumpings	11/–	10/–
- Source: Cricinfo, 15 June 2022

Alex Edwards (born 2 August 1975) was an English cricketer. He was a right-handed batsman and a right-arm medium-fast bowler who played for Sussex, Middlesex CB and Derbyshire between 1994 and 2001.

Edwards also had two Youth Test matches against India Under-19s, played his first match for Sussex, in the Second Eleven Championship in 1992, he played in his debut County Championship game in 1997, and appeared for Sussex until 1999. He also played in one match for Middlesex. In 2001, he played for Derbyshire County Cricket Club. He now plays regular club cricket for Wisborough Green CC in the Sussex county 3 division.
