= Wilfred Edwards =

Wilfred Edwards may refer to:

- Wilfred Edwards (VC) (1893–1972), English recipient of the Victoria Cross
- Wilfred Edwards (swimmer) (1889–1950), British swimmer
- Wilfred Norman Edwards (1890–1956), British geologist and paleobotanist
- Wilfrid Norman Edwards (1897–1994), British geologist
- Wilf Edwards (1905–1976), English footballer
