= Graham Edwards (Zimbabwean cricketer) =

Zimbabwean cricketer (born 1970)

Personal information
- Full name: Graham Colin Edwards
- Born: 19 September 1970 (age 56); Bulawayo, Matabeleland, Rhodesia
- Nickname: Suntan
- Batting: Right-handed
- Bowling: Right-arm medium

Domestic team information
- Years: Team
- 1994/95: Matabeleland

Career statistics
Competition	First-class
Matches	1
Runs scored	52
Batting average	26.00
100s/50s	–/–
Top score	32
Balls bowled	–
Wickets	–
Bowling average	–
5 wickets in innings	–
10 wickets in match	–
Best bowling	–
Catches/stumpings	1/–
- Source: Cricinfo, 21 September 2012

Graham Edwards (born 19 September 1970) is a former Zimbabwean cricketer. He was a right-handed batsman and right-arm medium-pace bowler who played for Matabeleland. He was born in Bulawayo.

Edwards made a single first-class appearance for the team, during the 1994/95 Logan Cup competition, against Mashonaland Under-25s. Batting in the lower order, Edwards scored 20 runs in the first innings and 32 in the second innings of the match, 32 being the highest individual score of the second innings.
