= Graham Edwards (footballer) =

English footballer

Personal information
- Date of birth: 21 July 1936 (age 90)
- Place of birth: Birkenhead, England
- Position: Forward

Senior career*
Years	Team	Apps	(Gls)
1960	VVV-Venlo	8	(4)
- * Club domestic league appearances and goals

Graham Edwards (born 21 July 1936) is an English former professional footballer who played as a forward in the Netherlands for VVV-Venlo.
