= Geoffrey Edwards (Canadian scientist) =

Canadian geomatics scientist

Geoffrey Edwards is a Canadian scientist who held the Canada Research Chair in Cognitive Geomatics from 2001 to 2015. Trained originally as an astrophysicist (Ph.D. in 1987 from Laval University, Quebec City, where he resides), he has published dozens of articles in areas of "classical" geomatics (image processing, cartographic generalization, spatial data structures, spatial analysis, error management, uncertainty evaluation, database fusion, etc.).

== Career ==
Since awarded the Canada Research Chair in Cognitive Geomatics, he concentrated his efforts towards the development of cognitively-informed tools for accessing and processing geospatial data. He also developed an unusual research programme that brought together a cognitive understanding of space and spatial design within an artistic perspective (installation, media and performance art), with applications to physical rehabilitation and to museology.

He was Associate Director of the GEOIDE Network of Centres of Excellence, a multimillion-dollar Canadian research network in applied geomatics, from 1999 to 2001, and Scientific Director from 2001 to 2003. He was also Director of Laval University's Centre de recherche en géomatique from 2004 to 2006. In addition, he has written extensively about the paradoxical nature of the 21st century as a result of changing population dynamics.

Today, Dr Edwards is CEO and owner of the fashion label transforma garments in addition to maintaining activities in academic research, although he is formally retired. He is also author of a science fiction novel, Plenum : The First Book of Deo, published by Untimely Books in 2021 under the name Geoffreyjen Edwards.

== Selected references ==
- Côté, François, Philippe Dubé, Geoffrey Edwards and Marie Louise Bourbeau, 2006, Museum, Motion and Emotion in the City, Museum International, Volume 58(3), 43-49.
- Edwards, Geoffrey and Marie Louise Bourbeau, 2008, Defining a Research Agenda for City Museums in a Peripheralizaing World, in City Museums and City Development (Ed. Ian Jones), New York: AltaMira Press, 110-128.
- Edwards, Geoffrey and Marie Louise Bourbeau, 2006, Cognitive Design Factors for Mixed Reality Environments, Proceedings of the First International Workshop on Mobile Geospatial Augmented Reality, Banff.
- Edwards, Geoffrey and Marie Louise Bourbeau, 2005, Image schemata - a guiding principle for multi-modal expression in performance design, International Journal of Performance Arts and Digital Media, Volume 1(3), 189-206.
- Fontaine, Sylvie, Geoffrey Edwards, Barbara Tversky and Michel Denis, 2005, Expert and Non-expert Knowledge of Loosely Structured Environments, in Lecture Notes in Computer Science, Volume 3693, 363-378.
- Yaagoubi, Reda and Geoffrey Edwards, 2008, Cognitive design in action : developing assistive technology for situational awareness for persons who are blind, Disability and Rehabilitation: Assistive Technology, Volume 3(5), 241-252.
- Mir-Abolfazl Mostafavi, Geoffrey Edwards, Robert Jeansoulin, 2004, An ontology-based method for quality assessment of spatial data bases, Third International Symposium on Spatial Data Quality, Volume 1(28a), 49-66.
