= "Big Boy" Teddy Edwards =

American singer

"Big Boy" Teddy Edwards was an American blues musician, from the United States, who recorded 23 songs from 1930 to 1936. Edwards was active in the Chicago area of the United States. There is very little biographical information published on Edwards' life.

Edwards played the tiple, a ten-stringed instrument, and was the only recorded blues tiple player during the period he was active. Edwards was also proficient on the guitar. Contemporary blues musician Big Bill Broonzy recalled working with Edwards, as well as Edwards working with Papa Charlie Jackson. Prolific session pianist Black Bob also recorded with Edwards on several of his later records. Edwards' song "Louise", recorded in 1934, was covered by Broonzy as "Louise Louise Blues".

== Recordings ==
Between 1930 and 1936, Edwards recorded 23 songs for the Vocalion, Melotone, Bluebird, Brunswick, and Decca record labels. Edwards was given several pseudonyms by the record companies that issued his recordings; these included "Teddy Edwards", ""Big Boy" Teddy Edwards", and "Eddy Teddy". Edwards' 1930 and 1931 records differ from his later output, singing with a simple tiple accompaniment. All of Edwards' sessions after this show him in a band setting with more of a pop music style, being accompanied by Big Bill Broonzy, Black Bob, and others.

=== 1930 ===
Recorded July 21, 1930

- "Them Things"
- "Family Trouble"

Recorded September 19, 1930

- "I Ain't Gonna Give You None"
- "Lovin' Blues"

Recorded December 12, 1930

- "Alcohol Mama"

=== 1931 ===
Recorded February 4, 1931

- "Wild Woman Blues"

=== 1934 ===
Recorded June 14, 1934

- "Who Did You Give My Barbecue To?" (Part 1)
- "Who Did You Give My Barbecue To?" (Part 2)
- "I'm Gonna Tell My Mama On You"
- "Louise"
- "Love Will Provide For Me"
- "If I Had A Girl Like You"

Recorded October 18, 1934

- "Good Doing Daddy" (Take 1)
- "Good Doing Daddy" (Take 2)
- "It Was No Dream"
- "Louise"
- "Dancing The Blues Away"
- "Hoodoo Blues"
- "Run Away Blues"

Recorded October 24, 1934

- "Who Did You Give My Barbecue To?" (Part 1)
- "Who Did You Give My Barbecue To?" (Part 2)

=== 1936 ===
Recorded May 15, 1936

- "W.P.A Blues"
- "Louisiana"
