= Elodie Edwards-Grossi =

French sociologist and historian

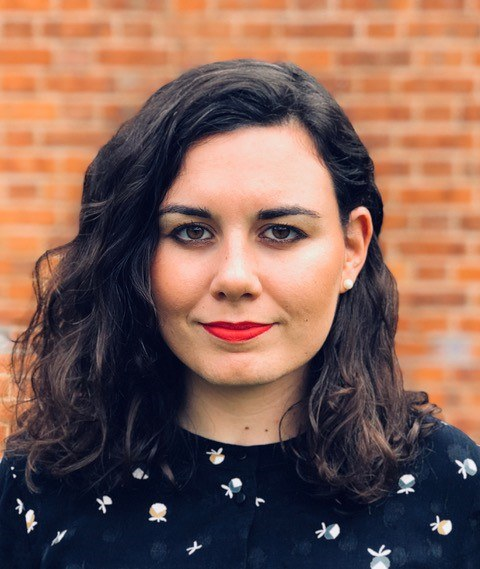
- Born: 1990

Academic background
- Education: University of Paris
- Doctoral advisor: Paul Schor

Elodie Edwards-Grossi is a French sociologist and historian. She researches the social history of racial psychiatry and theories of insanity, covering topics such as "medical apartheid" in American hospitals, theories of insanity, and resistance by patients to medical power. Her thesis was awarded several prizes, and was published in 2022. A second book on madness in the American South from 1840 to 1940 was awarded the 2023 Jules and Francis Landry Award. She was elected a junior member of the Institut Universitaire de France in 2023.

== Academic career ==
In 2018, Elodie Edwards-Grossi completed her doctoral thesis in sociology at the University of Paris. Her thesis covered the history of practices of racial discrimination in medicine in the United States and the construction of medical apartheid in southern hospitals since the late nineteenth century. Prepared in part in the United States at UCLA, and at Tulane University as Fulbright and Georges Lurcy Fellow, the thesis won the AFEA-Fulbright 2020 thesis prize, the PSL Science/Humanities interface price and the Prix du Conseil départemental de la Haute-Garonne in 2021.

Edwards-Grossi published her first book, based on her doctoral thesis, in January 2022 through the University of Rennes Press, as "Bad brains" (race et psychiatrie de la fin de l'esclavage à l'époque contemporaine aux Etats-Unis. Her second book, Mad with Freedom. The Political Economy of Blackness, Insanity, and Civil Rights in the U.S. South, 1840–1940, was published by Louisiana State University Press in 2022. The book won the 2023 Jules and Francis Landry Award. The book begins with an introduction to physician Samuel Cartwright (Cartwright is remembered for terming a slave's desire for freedom as a mental illness, drapetomania), and then examines experiences of African American patients at three hospitals in Virginia, North Carolina, and Louisiana, spanning more than century, and attracting praise for its scope and brevity.

Edwards-Grossi is an associate professor in American studies and sociology at IRISSO, Université Paris Dauphine. She was elected a junior member of the Institut Universitaire de France in 2023.
