= Helen Edwards (artist) =

English painter (1882–1963)

- Born: Helen Sutton; 18 February 1882; Eastbourne, Sussex
- Died: 18 January 1963 (aged 80); Three Legged Cross, Dorset
- Known for: Landscape painting
- Spouse: George Herbert Edwards

Helen Constance Pym Edwards née Sutton, (18 February 1882 – 1963) was a British landscape painter.

== Biography ==
Edwards was born and educated in Eastbourne in Sussex. Between 1906 and 1908 she studied art under Algernon Talmage at St Ives in Cornwall. She took further art lessons with H Dawson Barkas during 1909 at Reading in Berkshire. During her artistic career Edwards mainly painted landscapes, working in oils, pastels and watercolours. She exhibited with the Royal Society of British Artists, with the Portrait Society and the Society of Women Artists. In 1933 Edwards was elected a member of the British Watercolour Society. Edwards lived for a long period at Parkstone in Dorset and regularly exhibited with local art societies throughout Hampshire and Dorset. Several pastels by Edwards were reproduced by the Medici Society.
