= Ralph Edwards (politician) =

American politician

Ralph E. Edwards was an American politician from Maine. A Republican from Oxford, Maine, Edwards spent 4 terms (1942-1950) in the Maine Legislature. His first 4 years were spent in the Maine House of Representatives and his last 4 in the Maine Senate.

In 1961, the Legislature named a bridge over the Oxford Stream in Edwards' hometown of Oxford 'Ralph E. Edwards Bridge'.
