= USS Ray K. Edwards =

United States Navy high-speed transport

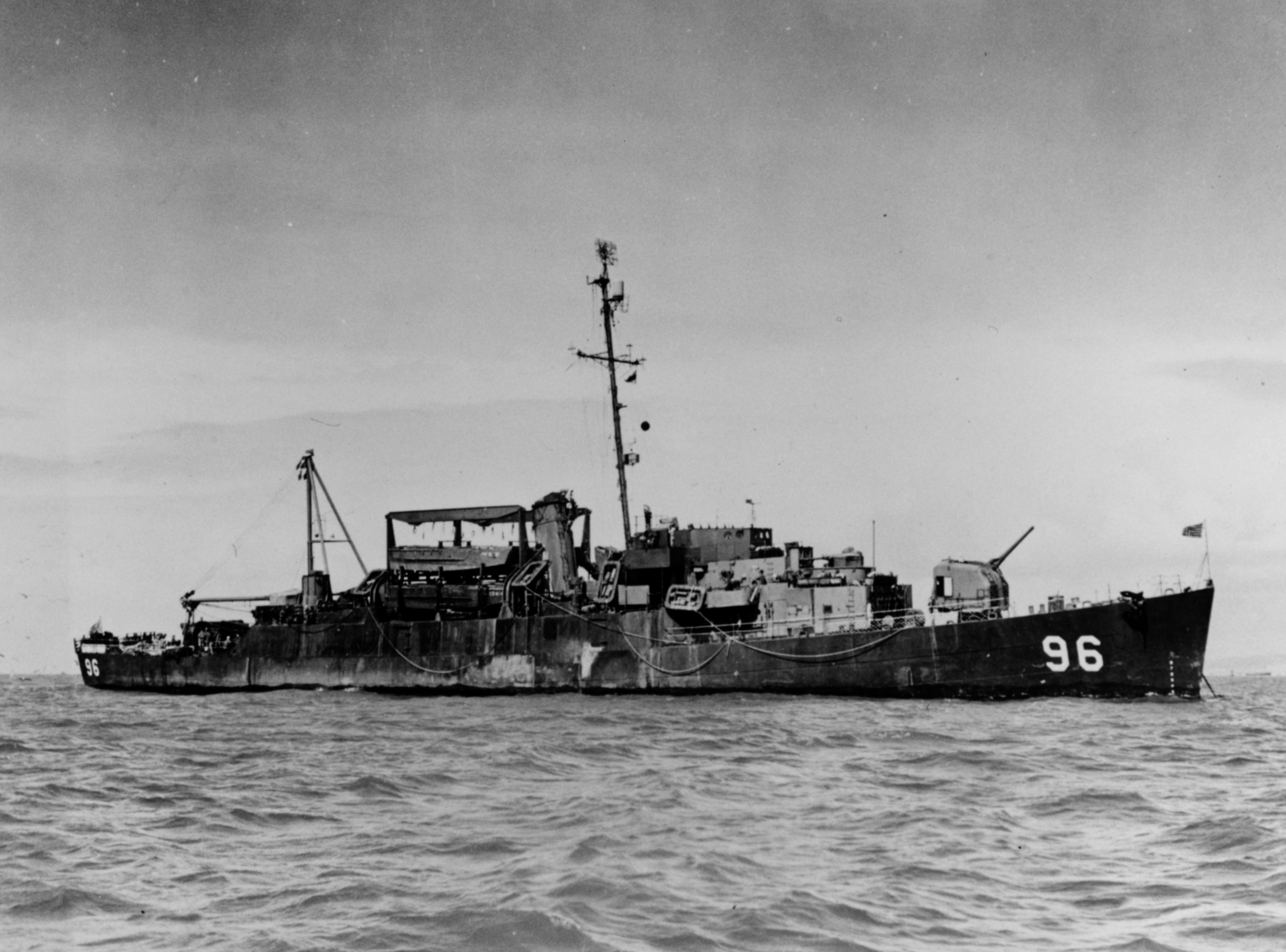
- USS Ray K. Edwards

History

United States
- Name: USS Ray K. Edwards (DE-237)
- Namesake: Corporal Ray K. Edwards (1923-1942), U.S. Marine Corps Silver Star recipient
- Builder: Charleston Navy Yard
- Laid down: 1 December 1943
- Launched: 19 February 1944
- Sponsored by: Mrs. Lena M. Edwards
- Reclassified: From destroyer escort (DE-237) to high-speed transport (APD-96) 17 July 1944
- Commissioned: 11 June 1945
- Decommissioned: 30 August 1946
- Stricken: 1 June 1960
- Fate: Sold for scrapping 15 June 1961

General characteristics
- Class & type: Crosley-class high speed transport
- Displacement: 2,130 long tons (2,164 t) full
- Length: 306 ft (93 m)
- Beam: 37 ft (11 m)
- Draft: 12 ft 7 in (3.84 m)
- Speed: 23 knots (43 km/h; 26 mph)
- Troops: 162
- Complement: 204
- Armament: 1 × 5 in (130 mm) gun; 6 × 40 mm guns; 6 × 20 mm guns; 2 × depth charge tracks
- Notes: Laid down as Rudderow-class destroyer escort USS Ray K. Edwards (DE-237)

USS Ray K. Edwards (APD-96), ex-DE-237, was a United States Navy high-speed transport in commission from 1945 to 1946.

== Namesake ==
Ray Keith Edwards was born on 11 November 1923 in Chicago, Illinois. He enlisted in the United States Navy on 16 June 1941. He requested transfer to the United States Marine Corps and became a corporal on 23 February 1942. He was killed in action on 12 September 1942 during a Japanese air attack on Guadalcanal. He posthumously was awarded the Silver Star.

== Construction and commissioning ==
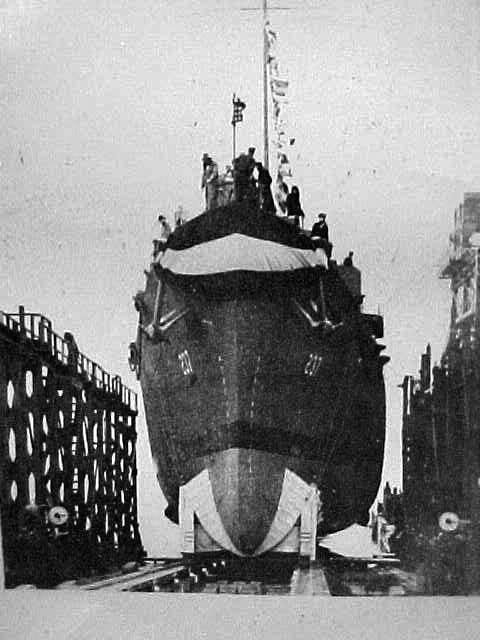
[Ray K. Edwards being launched at Charleston Navy Yard in Charleston, South Carolina, on 19 February 1944, prior to her conversion into a high-speed transport.

Ray K. Edwards was laid down as the Rudderow-class destroyer escort USS Ray K. Edwards (DE-237) on 1 December 1943 by the Charleston Navy Yard in Charleston, South Carolina and was launched on 19 February 1944, sponsored by Mrs. Lena M. Edwards, Corporal Edwards' mother. The ship was reclassified as a Crosley-class high-speed transport and redesignated APD-96 on 17 July 1944. After conversion to her new role, she was commissioned on 11 June 1945.

== Service history ==
Following shakedown off Guantanamo Bay, Cuba, Ray K. Edwards steamed for the Pacific Ocean. World War II ended on 15 August 1945 while she was en route. She reached San Diego, California, on 21 August 1945 and Pearl Harbor, Territory of Hawaii, on 12 September 1945. There she became flagship of Transport Division 104.

Ray K. Edwards departed Pearl Harbor on 14 September 1945 bound for Eniwetok and Okinawa, whence she steamed to Japan. She passed through the Bungo Strait and anchored in Fukuru Wan on 8 October 1945 to replenish minesweepers, tank landing ships (LSTs) and infantry landing craft (LCIs) assigned to that area. She remained in Japan through the end of 1945.

Returning to the United States, Ray K. Edwards transited the Panama Canal on 24 April 1946 and, after visits to Boston, Massachusetts, Jacksonville, Florida, and Charleston, South Carolina, she was towed to Mayport, Florida, where she arrived on 13 August 1946.

== Decommissioning and disposal ==
Decommissioned on 30 August 1946, Ray K. Edwards was berthed at Green Cove Springs, Florida, as part of the Atlantic Reserve Fleet. She was stricken from the Navy List on 1 June 1960, and sold on 15 June 1961 to Diamond Manufacturing Company of Georgia for scrapping.
