= Bert Edwards (cricketer) =

English cricketer

Cricket information
- Batting: Right-handed
- Bowling: Leg-break

International information

Career statistics
| Competition | First-class |
|---|---|
| Matches | 1 |
| Runs scored | 11 |
| Batting average | 5.50 |
| 100s/50s | 0/0 |
| Top score | 10 |
| Catches/stumpings | 1/– |
- Source: Cricinfo, 30 August 2019

Herbert Charles Edwards (3 December 1913 – 22 January 2002) was an English cricketer who played one first-class match, for Worcestershire against Lancashire at Old Trafford in 1946. Worcestershire lost the game by an innings well inside two days, with Edwards scoring 10 and 1. He held one catch, to dismiss Alan Wharton.

He was mostly a club cricketer, playing for Old Hill Cricket Club between 1932 and 1958, and serving as the club's president; in this he followed in the footsteps of his father before him.

Edwards was born in Colley Gate, then in Staffordshire; he died at the age of 88 in Stourbridge.
