= Leland Stowe =

American journalist

Leland Stowe (November 10, 1899 – January 16, 1994) was a Pulitzer Prize winning American journalist noted for being one of the first to recognize the expansionist character of the German Nazi regime.

== Biography ==
Stowe was born in Southbury, Connecticut. After graduating from Wesleyan University in 1921, where he was a member of a fraternity that later became a chapter of Kappa Alpha Society, he started working as a journalist and became a foreign correspondent in Paris in 1926 for the New York Tribune. He won a Pulitzer Prize in 1930 for his coverage of the Reparations Conference in The Hague. Stowe was a runner-up for a second Pulitzer Prize in 1940 for his work as a war correspondent in World War II and his coverage of the Russo-Finnish War.

In the summer of 1933, Stowe visited Nazi Germany. Shocked by its militarism, he wrote a series of critical articles that were not published as the articles were seen as too alarmist. Stowe published the articles in a book, Nazi Germany Means War; it was, however, not a success.

When World War II started in Europe in 1939, he worked as a war correspondent for the Chicago Daily News and the New York Post. He happened to be in Oslo on April 9, 1940, and therefore witnessed the German invasion, as well as the general confusion within the Norwegian forces, administration, and Allied Expeditionary Forces. Stowe "revealed the collaboration of Norwegian Vidkun Quisling in helping the Nazis seize Oslo without a shot." In 1942 Stowe as a war correspondent visited Moscow and traveled to the front lines of the still retreating troops of USSR. His travel companion and guide was Ilya Ehrenburg, a Russian-Jewish-Soviet war journalist. Stowe's book They Shall Not Sleep gives a rare insider view of an American journalist on the Soviet Army, and the events of the war from the Soviet side of the front.

Stowe's critical reportage was claimed to be one of the influences that helped bring down United Kingdom Prime Minister Neville Chamberlain. His writings also gave the Norwegian government-in-exile bad reports. The exiled government suffered an image problem, which C. J. Hambro worked to correct, working in exile.

Stowe worked as a correspondent throughout the war, covering 44 countries on four continents. After the war, Stowe was director of Radio Free Europe's News and Information Service from 1952 to 1954.

In 1955, he became a professor of journalism at the University of Michigan in Ann Arbor. During his tenure, he alternated between teaching one semester each academic year and working as an editor and staff writer for Reader's Digest. During this time he heard about a pioneering settler in British Columbia named Ralph Edwards and spent 12 days in his remote cabin interviewing him for the book Crusoe of Lonesome Lake (1957) which became one of Stowe's most popular books.

He taught at the university until he retired in 1970, after which he was a professor emeritus of journalism. He remained in Ann Arbor until his death.

In addition to the Pulitzer Prize, Stowe also received the Légion d'honneur, the War Cross (Greece), and honorary degrees from Harvard University, Wesleyan, and Hobart College, amongst other honors.

== Bibliography ==
- Nazi Germany Means War (1933)
- The Loyalists Can Still Win (1938)
- No Other Road to Freedom (1941)
- A Lesson from the Greeks (1942)
- They Shall Not Sleep (1944)
- Are You Voting for a Third World War? (1944)
- Challenge to Freedom (1945)
- While Time Remains (1946)
- Target: You (1949)
- Conquest By Terror: The Story of Satellite Europe (1952)
- Stowe, Leland (1953). "What's wrong with our women?". In Birmingham, Frederic A. (ed.). The girls from Esquire. London: Arthur Barker. pp. 233–248.
- Crusoe of Lonesome Lake (1957)
- "When the Saints Come Singing In" Reader's Digest 106 (April 1975) : 45–50
- The Last Great Frontiersman: The Remarkable Adventures of Tom Lamb (1982)
