= Herbert Edwards (cricketer, born 1884) =

English cricketer

Herbert Ivor Powell Edwards (12 March 1884 – 24 September 1946) was an English cricketer active in 1908 when he played in a single first-class match for Sussex as a righthanded batsman, scoring 22 runs. He was born in Westminster and died in Cowes.
