= Sam Edwards (disambiguation) =

Sam Edwards (1915–2004) was an American actor.

Sam or Samuel Edwards may also refer to:

- Samuel Edwards (Pennsylvania politician) (1785–1850), U.S. representative from Pennsylvania
- Samuel L. Edwards (1789–1877), New York politician
- Samuel Edwards (silversmith), American silversmith
- Samuel Edwards (MP), British government official and Whig politician
- Samuel Edwards, a pseudonym of the American author Noel Gerson (1913–1988)
- Sam Edwards (physicist) (1928–2015), British condensed-matter physicist
- Sam Edwards (rugby league), New Zealand rugby league footballer
- Samuel Jules Celestine Edwards (late 1850s–1894), Dominican editor, public speaker, author, and anti-racist activist
- Sam Edwards (rugby union) (born 2002), English rugby union footballer
