= Edward Livingston Edwards =

American judge (1812–1894)

Edward Livingston Edwards (March 17, 1812 – September 1, 1894) was a Missouri lawyer, state legislator, journalist, and judge.

== Early life, education, and career ==
Born in Rutherford County, Tennessee, Edwards grew up on a farm near Murfreesboro, attending a country school in the winter season.

At the age of 19, he was hired to teach in a new institution started in Williamson county, but his mind was on the West, and in the autumn of 1831 he resigned and moved to Jefferson City, Missouri. Here he read law under the supervision of his older brother, John Cummins Edwards, then secretary of state, and afterward governor of Missouri. In February 1835, Edwards he was licensed to practice, and was elected clerk of the circuit court and county court, the offices then having just become elective. In 1837 he was elected brigadier general of the first brigade, sixth division of the Missouri militia, but soon resigned. In 1838 he tried his hand at journalism by starting the Jefferson Enquirer, in company with John McCulloch, a Democratic paper which expired for lack of support at the close of the 1840 United States presidential election.

== Political and legal career ==
In 1841, Governor Thomas Reynolds appointed Edwards circuit attorney of the fourteenth circuit, but for personal reasons he only remained in that office for a short time. He then commenced in earnest the practice of his profession, and while thus engaged, in 1846, he was elected to the Missouri House of Representatives, and two years afterward he was elected to the Missouri Senate. While in the senate, he successfully introduced a bill prepared by Judge Robert William Wells materially changing the civil practice in courts of justice.

In 1858 Edwards discontinued his legal business, farming in the Osage Valley, but remained intensely interested in politics, and in 1860 became the editor in chief of The Examiner, published at the capital, a strong democratic organ. At the end of a short year he returned to his farm. During the American Civil War, his sympathies were with the confederates, but he took no active part.

In 1863 he once more left the farm, and resumed the practice of law. In 1874 he was again elected to the Missouri state legislature, to fill a vacancy in the Cole County delegation, and in May 1879, he was elected to a seat on the Missouri First Circuit Court, to fill a vacancy caused by the death of Judge George W. Miller. Edwards was reelected in November 1880 for term expiring in 1886.

== Personal life and death ==
In 1840, he married Ann Ivy Dixon, daughter of Warren Dixon, from North Carolina. They had three sons, one of whom died young, and one daughter. Edwards died in Jefferson City at the age of 82.
