= Richard G. Whitman =

Professor Richard G. Whitman is an academic, think tank member and media commentator focusing on the European Union's international role and the UK's foreign policy. He is professor of politics and international relations and a member of the Global Europe Centre at the University of Kent. He is also an associate fellow at Chatham House (formerly known as the Royal Institute of International Affairs).

== Biography ==
Whitman was professor of politics at the University of Bath 2006-2011. He was senior fellow, Europe (April 2006-April 2007) and head of the European Programme at Chatham House (April 2004 to April 2006). Prior to arrival at Chatham House, he was professor of European studies at the University of Westminster, where he was also director of the Centre for the Study of Democracy from 2001 to 2003.

== Academic work ==
Whitman is a co-lead editor of the Journal of Common Market Studies http://onlinelibrary.wiley.com/journal/10.1111/(ISSN)1468-5965 Whitman is co-editor of the Routledge Studies in European Security and Strategy book series. He is a contributor to leading journals, including International Affairs and the Journal of Common Market Studies, Cooperation and Conflict. His current research interests include the external relations and foreign and security and defence policies of the EU, and the governance and future priorities of the EU.

He has provided evidence to inquiries conducted by the UK House of Commons. and the House of Lords.

Whitman was elected a Fellow of the Academy of Social Sciences in October 2007 and a trustee of the British International Studies Association (BISA) in 2014 serving as vice chair in 2015–2016 and chair 2017–2018. He was chair of UACES, the academic association for Contemporary European Studies, from 2009 to 2012.

== Books ==
- The Handbook on European Security], co-edited with Sven Biscop, Routledge 2012. ISBN 978-1-13-884087-4
- The European Union as a Global Conflict Manager: Seeking security through engagement, co-edited with Stefan Wolff, Routledge 2012.
- Normative Power Europe: Empirical and theoretical perspectives (edited) Palgrave, 2011.
- The European Neighbourhood Policy in perspective: context, implementation and impact, co-edited with Stefan Wolff, Palgrave, 2010.
- The Foreign Policies of European Union Member States, co-edited with Ian Manners, Manchester University Press, 2000.
- Enlargement of the European Union: Issues and Strategies, co-edited with Victoria Curzon Price and Alice Landau, Routledge 1999.
- Rethinking the European Union: Institutions, Interests and Identities, co-edited with Alice Landau, Macmillan, 1997.
- From Civilian Power to Superpower: The International Identity of the European Union, Macmillan, 2008. ISBN 9780333694770
