= Ted Edwards (footballer) =

Australian rules footballer

Personal information
- Full name: Edward Edwards
- Born: 24 September 1883; Melbourne, Victoria
- Died: 20 April 1970 (aged 86); Hawthorn, Victoria
- Original team: Surrey Hills / Scotch College

Playing career^{1}
Years	Club	Games (Goals)
1906	St Kilda	1 (0)
- ^{1} Playing statistics correct to the end of 1906.

Edward Edwards (24 September 1883 – 20 April 1970) was an Australian rules footballer who played with St Kilda in the Victorian Football League (VFL).
