= Gary Edwards (photographer) =

British photographer

Gary Edwards has been a commercial and editorial photographer since 1989.

Born in Birmingham England, 27 August 1967, he was educated at Wrekin College and then studied Photography in Newcastle upon Tyne. Initially based in the UK, he relocated to southern Spain in 1992. Gary Edwards has been commissioned by numerous publications across Europe.

Edwards's commercial subject matter is varied, including interiors and architecture, hotels, people, cars, jewellery, travel. Over the years he has photographed many well-known people including, Antonio Banderas, Ricky Martin, Buzz Aldrin, Gary Player, Ulf Ekberg, B. B. King, Anthony Worral Thompson, Ray Charles, Kevin Woodford, Lindka Cierach, Eva Herzigova, Alan Whicker, and Ian Botham. Aside from his commercial work, Edwards's artistic Limited Edition Series photographs have been acquired by investment banks and 5 star hotels as well as individuals.

Direct descendant of Sir Judge Thomas Noon Talfourd
