= Clement Alexander Edwards =

British soldier

General Clement Alexander Edwards CB
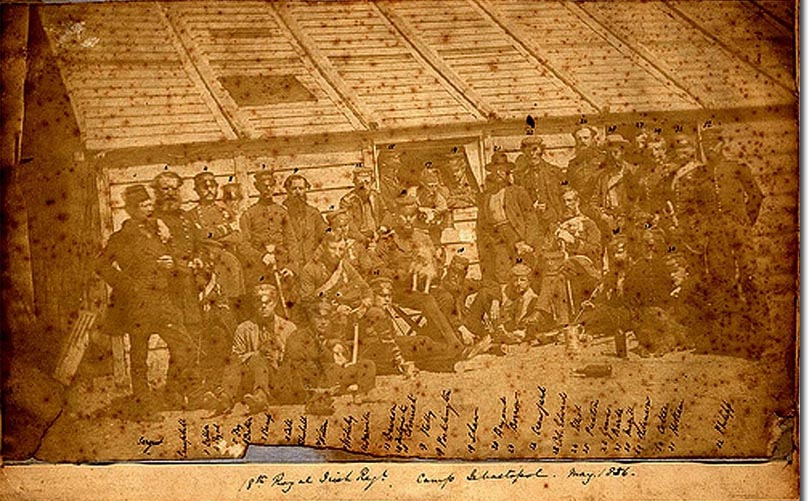
- 18th Royal Irish officers in Sebastopol, May 1856. Edwards is shown seated, tenth name from the right.
- Born: 12 November 1812; London, England
- Died: 29 July 1882 (aged 69); Leeson House, Blackheath, England
- Military career
- Allegiance: United Kingdom
- Branch: British Army
- Rank: General
- Wars: First Opium War; Second Anglo-Burmese War; Crimean War; Indian Rebellion
- Awards: Companion of the Order of the Bath

General Clement Alexander Edwards CB (12 November 1812 – 29 July 1882) was a British Army officer who became the colonel of the 2nd (The Queen's Royal) Regiment of Foot.

== Military career ==
Born in London, Edwards was the son of Colonel C. M. Edwards, the military secretary to the Duke of York. Educated at the Royal Military College, Sandhurst, he was commissioned as an ensign in the 31st Regiment of Foot on 11 June 1829. He saw action with the 18th Regiment of Foot at the Battle of Canton in March 1841, the Battle of Amoy in August 1841, the Battle of Chapu in May 1841, the Battle of Woosung in June 1842, and the Battle of Chinkiang in July 1842 during the First Opium War. Edwards became Assistant Quartermaster-General in China in December 1842 and then saw action in Burma in the autumn of 1851 during the Second Anglo-Burmese War. He also took part in the Siege of Sevastopol in the winter of 1854 during the Crimean War and commanded a brigade at Mhow during the Indian Rebellion. He went on to be Inspecting Field Officer in Bristol in April 1866 and Inspector-General of Recruiting at the War Office in July 1867.

Edwards became colonel of the 2nd (The Queen's Royal) Regiment of Foot on 15 March 1877 and colonel of the 18th Regiment of Foot on 25 March 1877. He died on 29 July 1882 at Leeson House, Blackheath, England.

Honorary titles
Preceded by Sir John Spink	Colonel of the 18th (The Royal Irish) Regiment of Foot; 1877−1882	Succeeded by Henry Smyth
Preceded by Sir John Forster FitzGerald	Colonel of the 2nd (The Queen's Royal) Regiment of Foot; 15 March 1877−25 March 1877	Succeeded by Sir Alexander Macdonell
