= Sym =

Sym may refer to:

- S'ym, comic book character
- Sım, Azerbaijan
- Sym (river), a left tributary of the Yenisey with a portage to the Vakh (Ob basin)
- The symmetric group on a set X, denoted Sym(X)
- The symmetrization linear operator

== People with the surname ==
- Karol Juliusz "Igo" Sym (1896–1941), an Austrian-born Polish actor and collaborator with Nazi Germany.
- John Sym (1809–1855), Scottish Presbyterian minister
- John Munro Sym (1839–1919), Scottish military officer, son of John Sym
- Michael Sym (died 1577), Scottish goldsmith

SYM may refer to:

- IATA code for Pu'er Simao Airport, Yunnan, China
- Sanyang Motor, Taiwanese maker of motorcycles and scooters
- the SYM-1, a single board "trainer" computer produced by Synertek
- N=4 supersymmetric Yang-Mills theory, a model of particles in mathematics and theoretical physics.
- Switzerland Yearly Meeting of the Religious Society of Friends (Quakers)
- Military/US Navy Code for commonly used equipment. example: Symbol 2842 [SYM 2842] - Jackbox, Sound-Powered Telephone.
