= Edwardes (disambiguation) =

Edwardes is a surname.

Edwardes may also refer to:

- Edwardes baronets, an extinct title in the Baronetage of England
- Edwardes College, Peshawar, Pakistan
- Edwardes Lake, in Reservoir, Victoria, Australia, a suburb of Melbourne
