= Thomas Guthrie =

Scottish divine and philanthropist

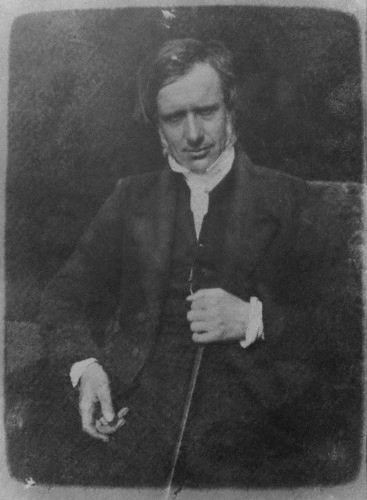
- Portrait of Thomas Guthrie made at the time of the Disruption Assembly of 1843 by Hill & Adamson.
- Born: 12 July 1803; Brechin, Forfarshire, Scotland
- Died: 24 February 1873 (aged 69); St Leonards-on-Sea, East Sussex, England
- Occupations: Philanthropist, Divine, minister
- Spouse: Anne Burns
- Children: Charles John Guthrie, Lord Guthrie

Thomas Guthrie FRSE (12 July 1803 – 24 February 1873) was a Scottish divine and philanthropist, born at Brechin in Angus (at that time also called Forfarshire). He was one of the most popular preachers of his day in Scotland, and was associated with many forms of philanthropy—especially temperance and Ragged Schools, of which he was a founder.

== Life ==
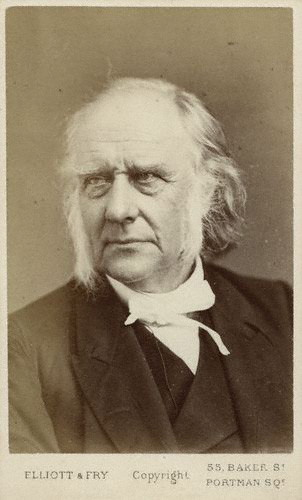
Carte de visite showing Guthrie in the early 1870s.

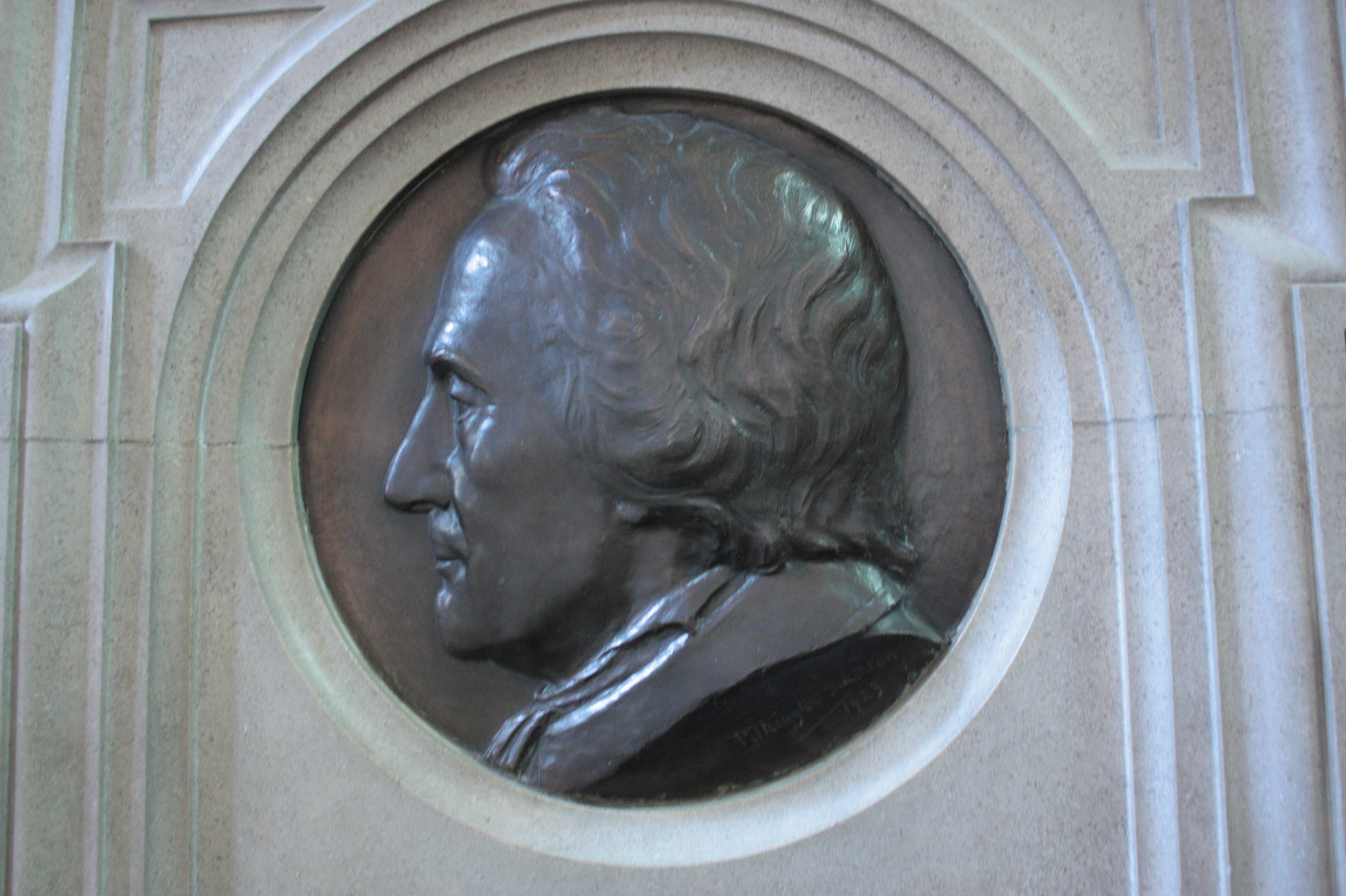
memorial to Dr Thomas Guthrie in St Giles Cathedral, Edinburgh

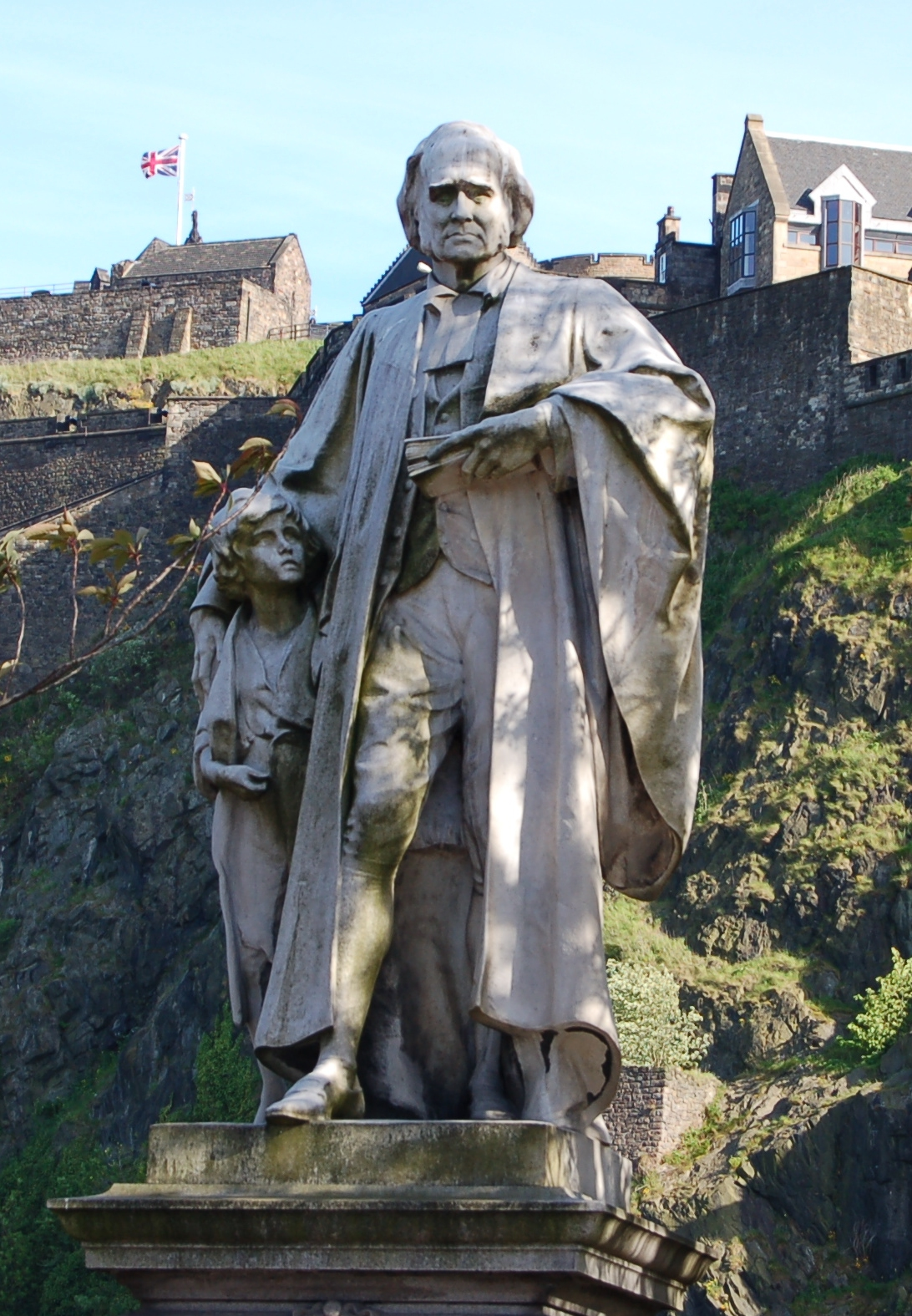
The statue of Thomas Guthrie on Princes Street, Edinburgh

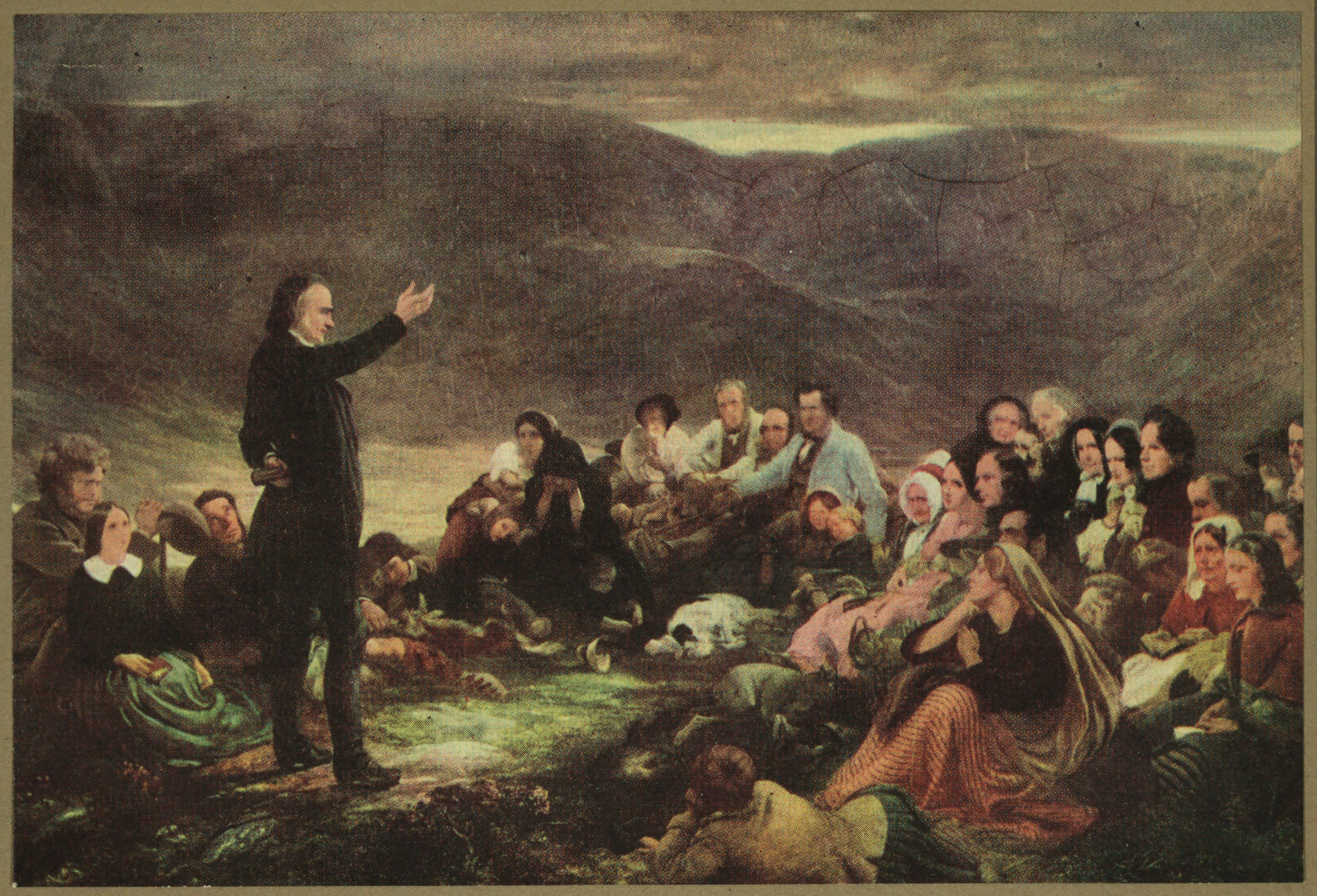
Book illustration of George Harvey's Dr. Guthrie preaching in the Glen

He was born on 12 July 1803 the son of David Guthrie, a banker, and later Provost of Brechin. Thomas grew to a height of six foot and three inches.

Guthrie studied at Edinburgh University for both surgery and anatomy (under Dr Robert Knox) but then concentrated on Theology. He was licensed to preach in the Church of Scotland from 1825, but having established a reputation as an evangelical he had difficulty securing a parish and instead spent two years studying medicine and science in Paris. Following his return from Paris and a period of varied employment, including as a bank manager, he was eventually offered the living of Arbirlot in Angus by the Hon William Maule in 1830. Guthrie served as Minister of Arbirlot for eight years, and while there where he adopted a dramatic style of preaching suited to his rural congregation. As well as his training for the Ministry, his medical knowledge and experience was called upon in particular during an outbreak of cholera in the parish.

In 1837 Guthrie was called to the second charge of Old Greyfriars Church, Edinburgh, alongside first charge minister Rev John Sym. Edinburgh Town Council discontinued the second charge at Old Greyfriars in October 1840 and instead created a new parish called St John's. A new church was built on Victoria Street to serve this role with Guthrie as its first minister.

Guthrie left the Church of Scotland in the Disruption of 1843 and many of his congregation followed him. They worshipped for 2 years in the Methodist Hall in Nicholson Square before moving into the purpose-built Free St John's, Johnston Terrace (now St Columba's Free Church) in 1845. Possessed of a commanding presence and voice, and a remarkably effective and picturesque style of oratory, he became perhaps the most popular preacher of his day in Scotland, and was associated with many forms of philanthropy, especially temperance and ragged schools, of which he was a founder; he first publicizing the idea in his "Plea for Ragged Schools" in 1847. His hard work as a proponent and founder of the Ragged Schools movement led him to be quoted by Samuel Smiles in his Self Help. The first ragged school was soon opened on Castle Hill, Edinburgh.

He was one of the leaders of the Free Church of Scotland, and raised over £116,000 for the Manse Fund for its ministers. Guthrie expressed serious concern that the Manse Fund would stretch the generosity of Free Church people to the limit but his fears were unfounded. After Guthrie had toured 13 Synods and 58 Presbyteries in less than a year, he was able to announce to the General Assembly of June 1846 that £116,370 had been raised. It is unlikely that anyone else could have achieved what he did in such a short space of time. His energy and oratory enabled the Manse Fund to smash its original target. Numerous ministers and their families owed a huge debt of gratitude to Guthrie for providing the resources to build manses so that the gospel could continue to prosper not just in the Highlands but across the whole of Scotland. Along with his Ragged Schools the Manse Fund was one of Guthrie's greatest legacies. With the one he showed mercy to helpless children and with the other he fought oppression by raising funds for manses.

He was made Moderator of the General Assembly of the Free Church of Scotland in 1862. He was succeeded in 1863 by Rev Roderick McLeod. Other roles included manager of Edinburgh Royal Infirmary, work for the Blind Asylum and work at the Night Refuge. In 1847 the degree of D.D. was conferred on him by the University of Edinburgh.

Dr Guthrie's most enduring legacy was the Ragged Schools which had a unique curriculum; education, regular meals, clothes, "industrial training" and Christian instruction. Most of the ragged children who attended the schools did not remain overnight but were in school for 12 hours in the summer and 11 hours in the winter. The day started at 8 am with the rather painful sounding 'ablutions' and the children were dismissed at 7:15 pm after supper. Guthrie describes the daily routine; "in the morning they are to break their fast on a diet of the plainest fare, – then march from their meal to their books; in the afternoon they are again to be provided with a dinner of the cheapest kind, – then back again to school; from which after supper, they return not to the walls of an hospital, but to their own homes. There, carrying with them a holy lesson, they may prove Christian missionaries to those dwellings of darkness and sin" Thomas Guthrie, Seed-Time and Harvest of Ragged Schools,.

The unique curriculum of Ragged Schools was done in an environment of discipline and structure although there is never a sense that the schools were harsh or austere. Guthrie was no great fan of corporal punishment and instead encouraged staff to win over children with kindness; "these Arabs of the city are wild as those of the desert, and must be broken into three habits, – those of discipline, learning and industry, not to speak of cleanliness. To accomplish this, our trust is in the almost omnipotent power of Christian kindness. Hard words and harder blows are thrown away here. With these alas they are too familiar at home, and have learned to be as indifferent to them as the smith's dog to the shower of sparks" Thomas Guthrie, Seed-Time and Harvest of Ragged Schools,. While Guthrie's management of the Ragged Schools was never sectarian or denominational he never compromised on Christian education. Perhaps one of his best quotes about the Ragged Schools sums up this view; "the Bible, the whole Bible, and nothing but the Bible; the Bible without note or comment – without the authoritative interpretation of priest or presbyter – as the foundation of all its religious teaching, and of its religious teaching to all". It was, however, through objections to the religious part of the curriculum that those who differed from Guthrie on the issue later founded the United Industrial School, giving combined secular and separate religious instruction.

Guthrie himself saw the Ragged Schools as his most enduring legacy; "I never engaged in a cause, as a man and a Christian minister that I believe on my death-bed I will look back on with more pleasure or gratitude to God, than that he led me to work for Ragged Schools. I have the satisfaction, when I lay my head upon my pillow, of always finding one soft part of it: and that is, that God has made me an instrument in His hand of saving many a poor creature from a life of misery and crime" Thomas Guthrie and Sons, Autobiography and Memoirs (London, 1896, p 496). Guthrie’s legacy of Ragged Schools did more than almost any social philanthropist in history to change the nation of Scotland. Amongst Guthrie’s last words he was overheard to say "a brand plucked from the burning!" His legacy was that through his vision and love for his Saviour, the Ragged School movement was established which in turn plucked thousands of little brands from a life of poverty and crime, and brought them to know the ultimate friend of sinners.

As well as Ragged Schools Guthrie was also well known for his work as a temperance campaigner, although he did not become a total abstainer himself until the age of 38. While he was always against drunkenness it was an experience while over in Ireland that turned him away from drink altogether. While travelling with a ministerial friend in 1841 they stopped at a small county inn on a terrible cold night. Seeking some warmth and comfort they ordered some ‘toddies’ (whiskey and hot water). Out of kindness they called in their driver and offered him the same hospitality. Guthrie was stunned when this staunch, but uneducated and uncultured, Roman Catholic explained that he was a teetotaller and would not touch a drop of alcohol. From that day forward Guthrie resolved to abstain from alcohol and became one of the leaders of the temperance movement.

The determination with which Guthrie pursued the temperance cause was all the more remarkable when we understand how unusual this position was in the first half of the 19th century. In his autobiography he reckons that when he was at Edinburgh University there was not a single student who was an abstainer. Perhaps even more remarkably Guthrie was unaware of any minister in the Church of Scotland who was a teetotaller. Undeterred by this, Guthrie established the Free Church Temperance Society along with Horatius Bonar and William Chalmers Burns. When the ‘Scottish Association for the Suppression of Drunkenness’ was formed in 1850 they turned to Guthrie to write their first booklet entitled ‘A Plea on behalf of Drunkards and against Drunkenness’. Other booklets followed and Guthrie was instrumental in bringing about the Licensing (Scotland) Act 1853 or the ‘Forbes Mackenzie Act’, as it is better known. This Act forced public houses to close at 10.00 pm on weekdays and all day on Sundays. Even today it is still illegal to buy alcohol after 10.00 pm in shops, although this is not so in Public Houses.

Guthrie’s work on total abstinence reached its climax with preaching a series of sermons on Luke 19 v 41 and their publication under the title, 'The City, Its Sins and Sorrows’ in 1857. The stories of the impact that these sermons had around the world are many and varied but space allows us to mention only one of them. One of Guthrie’s later biographers, Oliphant Smeaton, recounts meeting a wealthy Scot while visiting Australia. This man, while resident in Scotland, had lived a dissolute lifestyle but one day found himself wandering in to St John’s Free Church. Listening to the powerful oratory of Guthrie as he preached on Christ weeping over Jerusalem, the man left affected but unchanged. All week he tried to kill his conscience through plunging headlong into drunkenness.

The following Sunday he was drawn back to hear Guthrie again despite being under the influence of drink. The great orator did not disappoint. Toward the end of his sermon he leaned his huge frame over the pulpit and said with great feeling: "There are few families among us so happy as not to have had some one near and dear to them either in imminent peril hanging over the precipice, or the slave of intemperance altogether sold under sin." The hearer could contain his emotions no longer and left a broken man. The following day he sought out Dr Guthrie and was dealt with "fatherly kindness." He continues: "when he had knelt with me at the throne of grace, and offered up a prayer, the like of which I never heard before or since, he bade me farewell, inviting me to return and see him: but I never did so". Within weeks the man was on a ship to Australia where he became a wealthy businessman and generous contributor to charity work.

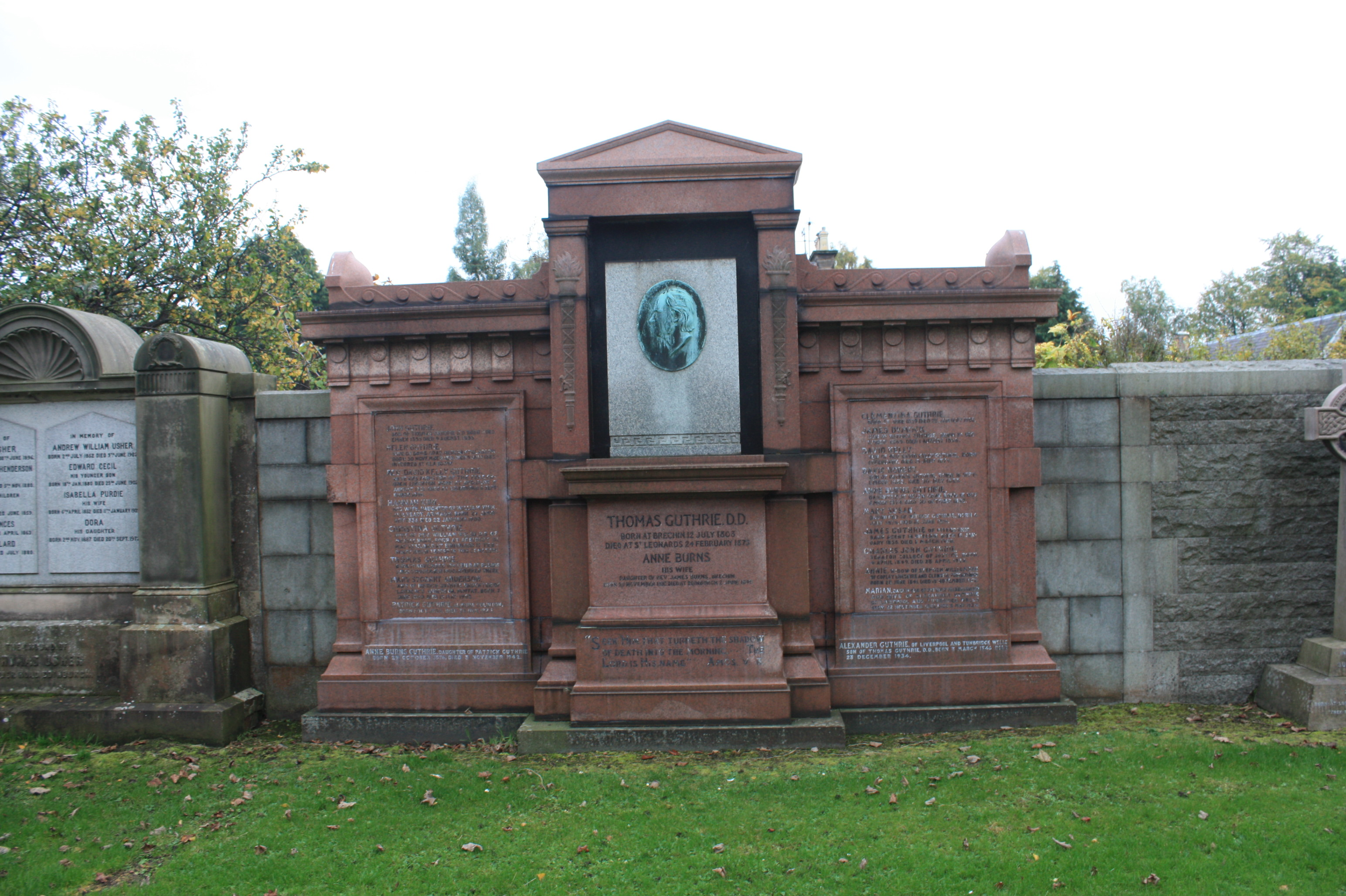
The grave of Rev Thomas Guthrie, Grange Cemetery, Edinburgh

Among his writings are The Gospel in Ezekiel (1855) and Plea for Ragged Schools (1847), and The City, its Sins and Sorrows (1857), "Christ and the Inheritance of the Saints" (1858), "The Way to Life", Speaking to the Heart", the "Life of Robert Flockhart", "Man and the Gospel" (1865), "The Angels Song" (1865), "The Parables" (1866), "Our Fathers Business" (1867), "Out of Harness" (1867), "Early Piety" (1869), "Studies of Character" (1868–70) and "Sundays Abroad" (1871), "The Sunday Magazine"

Born at Brechin, Forfarshire. Minister successively of Arbirlot and of Old Greyfriars and St John's parish churches and of Free St John's Church in this city.

Thomas Guthrie died at St Leonards-on-Sea in Sussex in 1873 and was buried in The Grange Cemetery, Edinburgh. His grave is in a commanding position, terminating the main central avenue at its southern end. His will left his copy of the National Covenant to the Free Church.

His wife, Anne Burns (1810–1899), daughter of Rev James Burns of Brechin, is buried with him.

== Memorials ==
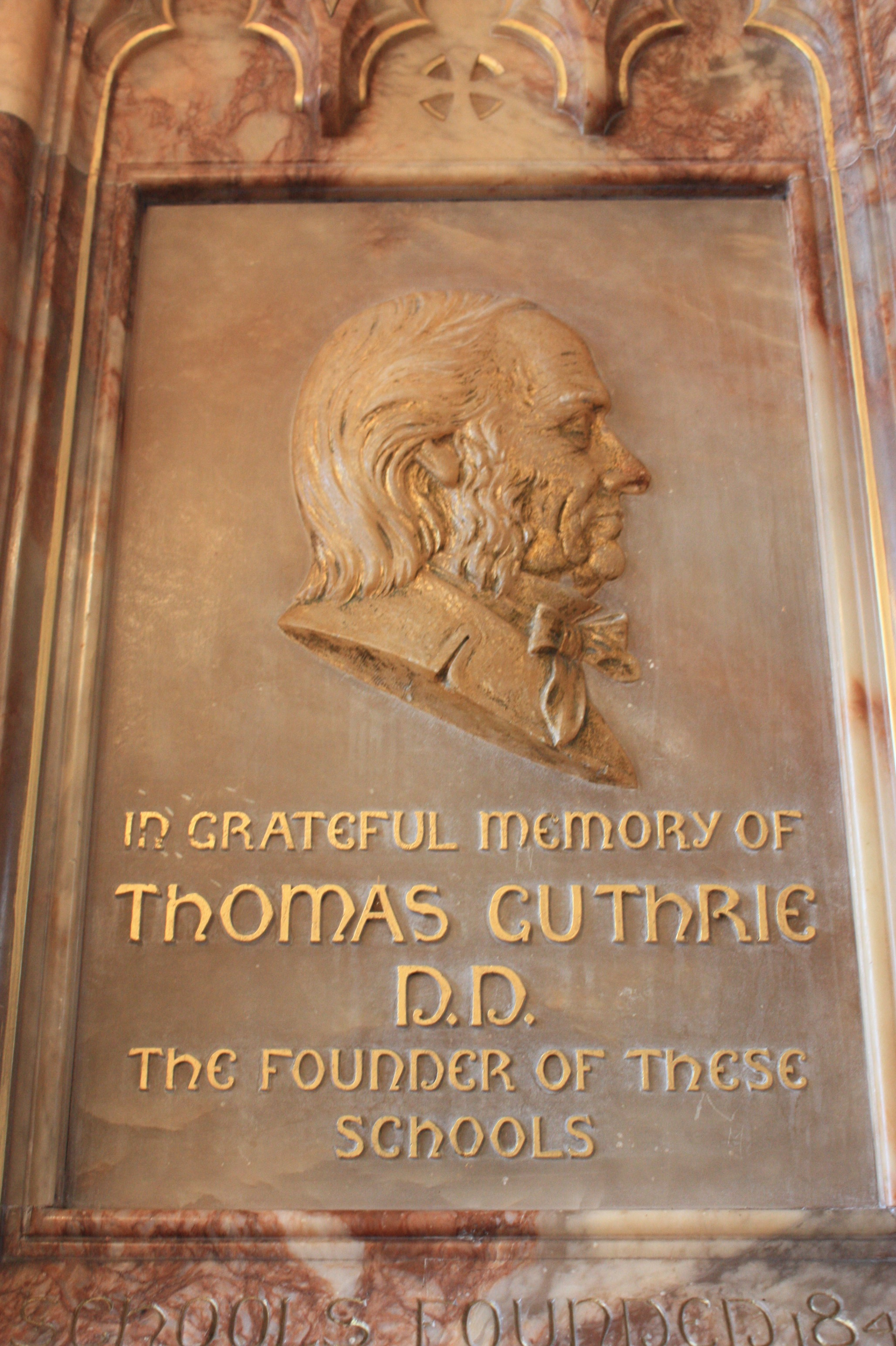
Memorial to Thomas Guthrie in the Thomas Guthrie School

Tributes in memory of him include the following:

- A statue of him, in Portland stone, stands on Princes Street in Edinburgh, facing Castle Street. It was executed by the sculptor F. W. Pomeroy, and erected in 1910. Reading - An eloquent preacher of the gospel. Founder of the Edinburgh Original Ragged Industrial Schools, and by tongue and pen, the apostle of the movement elsewhere. One of the earliest temperance reformers. A friend of the poor and of the oppressed.
- A large marble bust of him, by the main entrance of Free St Columba's (formerly Free St John's), has been erected to his memory shortly after his death in 1873. This bust was duly removed by the United Free Church congregation, who re-erected it in Martyrs and St John's Church on George IV Bridge. There it remained — once misleadingly proclaiming Guthrie to have been 'the first minister of this church' — until the dissolution of the congregation in 1973, when it was offered back to, and gratefully accepted by, the Deacons' Court of Free St Columba's.

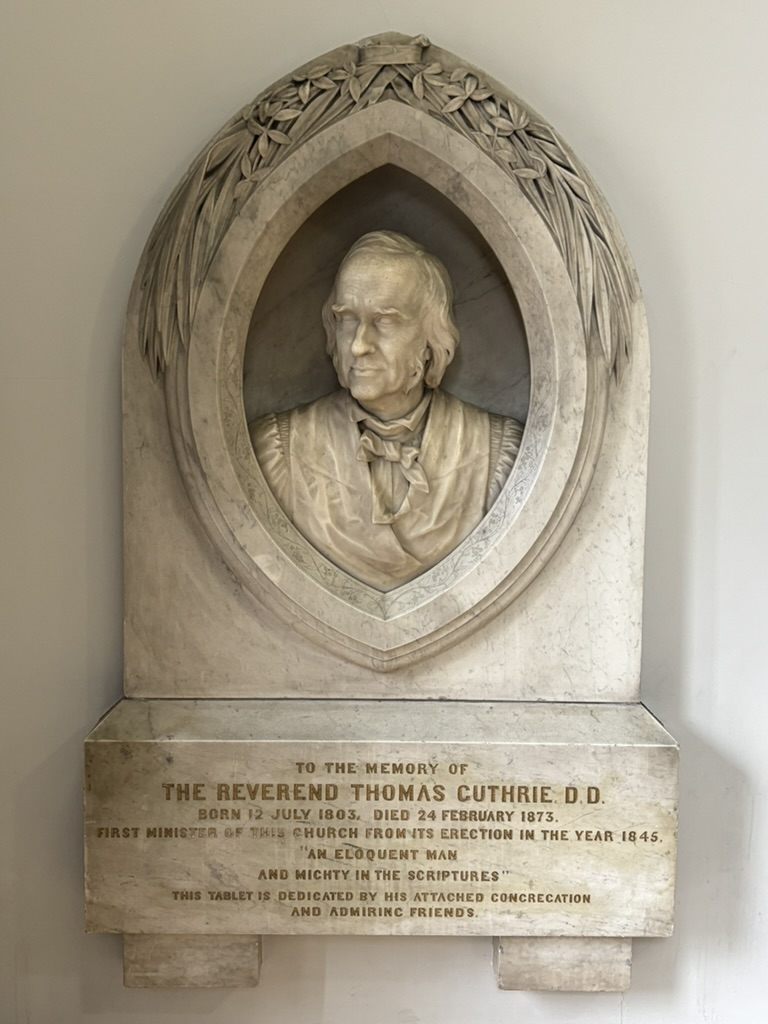
The Marble Bust of Thomas Guthrie at the entrance of St Columba's Free Church, Edinburgh

- A plaque on the south wall of St. Giles Cathedral, executed by Pilkington Jackson
- A plaque in the former Thomas Guthrie School in Liberton (now converted to flats and named "Smiddy Wynd")
- A memorial in Brechin Cathedral (to him, and to his wife)
- A sandstone bust is incorporated into the front wall of a house (now Creag Dhubh guesthouse) in Inveraray commemorating his stay in the house during the summer if 1866

== Family and descendants ==
Guthrie was married to Anne Burns, daughter of Rev James Burns, minister of Brechin Cathedral.

Thomas Guthrie was father of Lord Guthrie; and great-grandfather of Tyrone Guthrie (1900–1971), a theatre director in Britain, Canada and Ireland and John Guthrie Ward (1909–1991), a diplomat who became British Ambassador to Argentina (1957–1961) and Italy (1962–1966).
