= Frank Edwards =

Frank Edwards may refer to:

== Arts and entertainment ==
- Frank Edwards (writer and broadcaster) (1908–1967), American radio writer and broadcaster
- Frank Edwards (blues musician) (1909–2002), American blues musician
- Frank Edwards (gospel musician) (born 1989), Nigerian gospel musician

== Politics ==
- Sir Francis Edwards, 1st Baronet (1852–1927), known as Frank Edwards, British politician
- Frank Edwards (Australian politician) (1887–1983), Australian politician
- Frank Edwards (Illinois politician) (1950–2020), American politician
- Frank E. Edwards (1874–1943), American politician

== Others ==
- Frank Edwards (cricketer) (1885–1970), English cricketer
- Frank Edwards (motorsports), American NASCAR fabricator and crew chief with Hendrick Motorsports
- Frank Edwards (British Army soldier) (1893–1964), British Army soldier
- Teannie Edwards (Frank Nutinous Edwards, 1904–1977), American baseball player
- Frank Edwards (communist) (1907–1983), Irish teacher and communist

== Other uses ==
- Frank G. Edwards House, historic building in San Francisco, California

== See also ==
- Francis Edwards (disambiguation)
