= Thomas Edwardes =

Thomas Edwardes may refer to:

- Sir Thomas Edwardes, 1st Baronet (1599–1660), of the Edwardes baronets
- Sir Thomas Edwardes, 6th Baronet (1730–1790), of the Edwardes baronets
- Sir Thomas Edwardes, 7th Baronet (1727–1797), of the Edwardes baronets

== See also ==
- Thomas Edwards (disambiguation)
- Edwardes (surname)
