= Lord Guthrie =

Lord Guthrie may refer to:

- Charles John Guthrie, Lord Guthrie (1849–1920), Scottish judge and lawyer
- Charles Guthrie, Baron Guthrie of Craigiebank (1938–2025), British senior military officer
