= Thomas Edwards =

Thomas Edwards or Tom Edwards may refer to:

== Arts and entertainment ==
- Thomas Edwards (poet) (died 1595), author of Cephalus and Procris; Narcissus
- Thomas Edwards (critic) (1699–1757), English critic and poet
- Twm o'r Nant (1739–1810), pen name of Welsh playwright Thomas Edwards
- Thomas Edwards (legal writer) (1775–1845), legal writer
- Thomas Edwards (author) (1779–1858), Welsh author
- Thomas Edwards (artist) (1795–1869), portraitist in Boston, Massachusetts
- Tommy Edwards (Thomas J. Edwards, 1922–1969), American singer and songwriter
- Tom Edwards (broadcaster) (1945–2025), British radio presenter and television announcer
- Tom Edwards (musician), British musician
- Tom Edwards (actor), Canadian voice actor

== Politics ==
- Thomas Edwards (MP for Lichfield), in 1554 and 1555, member of parliament (MP) for Lichfield
- Thomas Edwards (MP for Calne) (1555–1634), MP for Calne
- Thomas Edwards (MP for Wells) (c. 1673–c. 1745), English member of parliament for Wells, 1719–1735
- Thomas Edwards-Freeman (1720s–1808), MP for Steyning
- Thomas Edwards (TJAG) (1753–1806), judge advocate general of the United States Army
- Thomas M. Edwards (1795–1875), U.S. representative from New Hampshire
- Thomas O. Edwards (1810–1876), U.S. representative from Ohio
- Thomas D. Edwards (1849–1935), American diplomat
- Thomas Edwards (Australian politician) (1875–1951), represented Barossa from 1930 to 1933
- Chet Edwards (Thomas Chester Edwards, born 1951), U.S. representative from Texas

== Religion ==
- Thomas Edwards (heresiographer) (1599–1647), English Puritan clergyman and author of Gangraena
- Thomas Edwards (orientalist) (1652–1721), Welsh divine and orientalist
- Thomas Edwards (divine) (1729–1785), Anglican clergyman and divine
- Thomas Edwards (fl. 1810), divine
- Thomas Charles Edwards (1837–1900), Welsh minister, writer and academic
- Thomas Edwards (priest) (1933–2011), Anglican priest in Wales

== Sports ==
- Tom Edwards (American football) (1899–1980), All-American football player
- Tom Edwards (Australian footballer) (born 2000), Australian rules footballer
- Tom Edwards (footballer, born 1906) (1906–1980), Linfield and Wales international footballer
- Tom Edwards (footballer, born 1999), Stoke City footballer
- Tommy Edwards (basketball) (1911–1977), American professional basketball player
- Tommy Edwards (footballer) (1923–2000), Welsh footballer

== Other ==
- Thomas Edwards (silversmith), in colonial Boston, Massachusetts
- Thomas E. Edwards or SS Edmund Fitzgerald, an American Great Lakes freighter that sank in a Lake Superior storm in 1975
- Thomas Edwards (VC) (1863–1953), English recipient of the Victoria Cross
- Tom Edwards (geographer) (born c. 1965), American geographer and geopolitical consultant
- G. Thomas Edwards (1931–2018), American historian
- Thomas Francis Edwards (1944–2009), American serial killer

== See also ==
- Thomas Edwardes (disambiguation)
- Thomas Edward (disambiguation)
