= Thomas Edward =

Thomas Edward may refer to:

- Thomas Edward (naturalist) (1814–1886), Scottish naturalist
- Thomas Edward (MP), MP for Taunton

== See also ==
- Thomas Edwards (disambiguation)
- T. E. Lawrence (1888–1935), Thomas Edward Lawrence, British soldier, liaison officer during the Arab Revolt
- Thomas E. Watson (1856–1922), American politician from Georgia
- Thomas Edward Brown (1830–1897), Manx poet, scholar and theologian
- Thomas Edward Bridgett (1829–1899), English priest and historical writer
