= Francis Edwardes (disambiguation) =

Francis Edwardes was a British MP.

Francis Edwardes may also refer to:

- Sir Francis Edwardes, 2nd Baronet (1643–1690), of the Edwardes baronets
- Sir Francis Edwardes, 3rd Baronet (died 1701), of the Edwardes baronets
- Sir Francis Edwardes, 4th Baronet (1699–1734), of the Edwardes baronets

== See also ==
- Francis Edwards (disambiguation)
