= Francis Edwards =

Francis Edwards is the name of:

- Sir Francis Edwards, 1st Baronet (1852–1927), British Liberal Party politician
- Francis S. Edwards (1817–1899), U.S. Representative from New York
- Francis Edwards (architect) (1784–1857), British neo-classical architect
- Francis Edwards (The Bill), fictional character from the British television series
- F. Henry Edwards (1897–1991), English leader in the Reorganized Church of Jesus Christ of Latter Day Saints

== See also ==
- Francis Edwardes (disambiguation)
- Frank Edwards (disambiguation)
- James Francis Edwards (1921–2022), decorated Canadian fighter pilot during World War II
