= Edwardes =

Origin
- Origin: English

Other names
- Variant form: Edwards

Edwardes is a family name of English origins. It is a variant of Edwards, and means "son of Edward".

People with this surname include:

- Cheryl Edwardes (born 1950), Australian retired politician
- David Edwardes (fl. 1532), English anatomist
- Francis Edwardes (disambiguation), three Edwardes baronets and a Member of Parliament
- George Edwardes (1855–1915), English theatre manager
- Herbert Benjamin Edwardes (1819–1868), English administrator, major-general and statesman
- May de Montravel Edwardes (1887–1967), English painter
- Michael Edwardes (1930–2019), British-South African business executive
- Olga Edwardes (1917–2008) British-South African actress and artist
- Richard Edwardes (1525–1566), English poet, playwright and composer; suspected of being a son of Henry VIII
- Thomas Edwardes (disambiguation), three Edwardes baronets
- William Edwardes (disambiguation), four Barons Kensington

In the Alfred Hitchcock film Spellbound, Gregory Peck's character impersonates murder victim Dr. Anthony Edwardes.

== See also ==
- Edwardes family
- Edwards (disambiguation)
