= London Irish Rifles =

- Crest of the London Irish Rifles
- Active: 1859−1919; 1920−2022
- Country: United Kingdom
- Branch: Army Reserve
- Type: Infantry
- Role: Rifles
- Size: One company
- Part of: London Regiment
- Garrison/HQ: Duke of York's Headquarters (1912−2000); Flodden Road, Camberwell (2000−2022)
- Motto: Quis separabit "Who would separate (us) (from the British Crown)"
- March: "Garryowen"
- Anniversaries: St Patrick's Day (17 Mar); Loos (25 Sep)

Insignia
- Tartan: Saffron (pipers kilts)
- Hackle: St Patrick's Blue Hackle worn by Officers, Warrant Officers and Pipers. Dark Green Hackle worn by all other ranks.

The London Irish Rifles (LIR) was a reserve infantry regiment and then company of the British Army. The unit's final incarnation was as D (London Irish Rifles) Company, the London Regiment. On 1 April 2022 soldiers in the company transferred to foot guards regiments and the company became No 15 (Loos) Company, Irish Guards.

== History ==
=== 1859–1914 ===
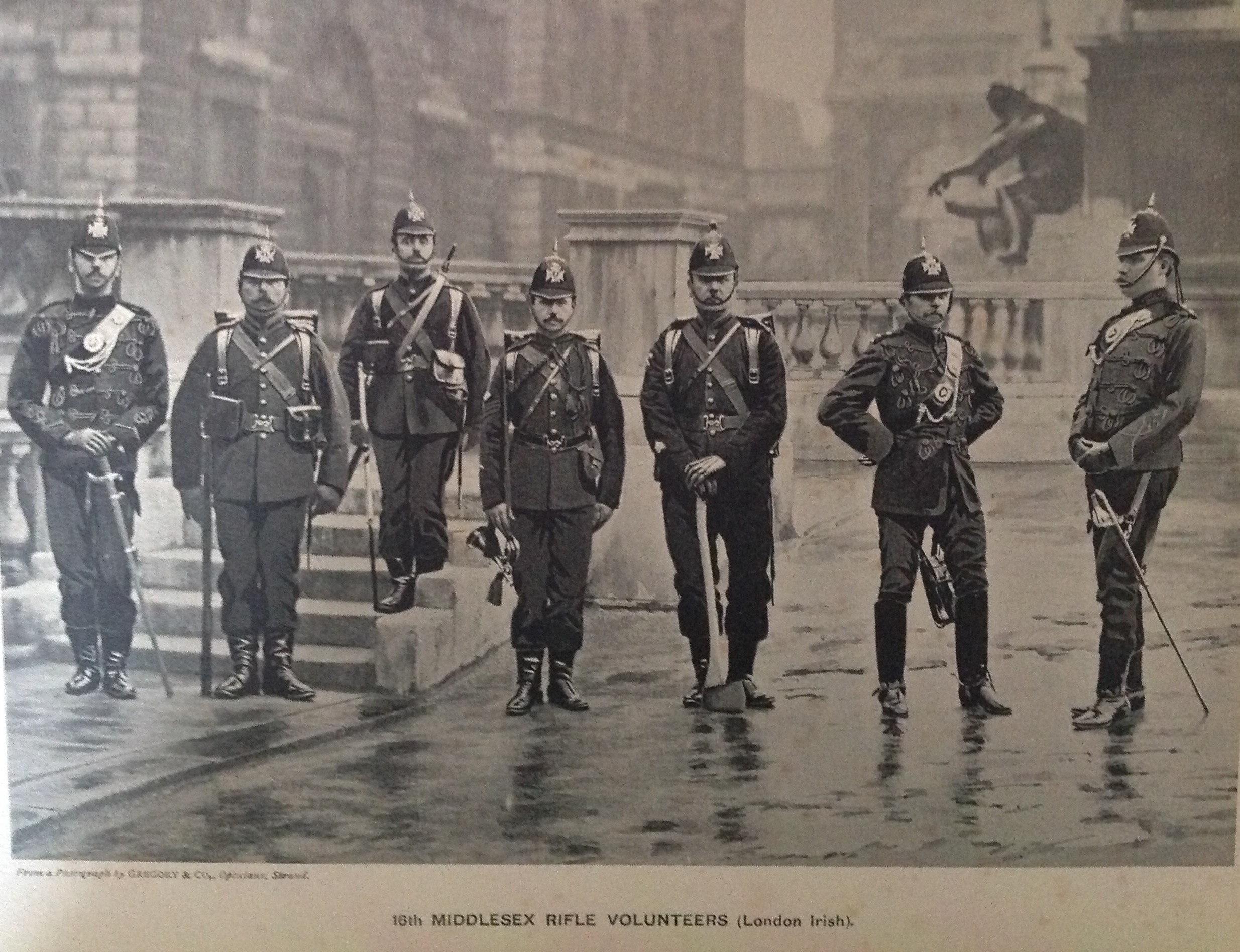
16th Middlesex Rifle Volunteers (London Irish), c1895

The London Irish Rifles was originally formed in 1859 during the Victorian Volunteer Movement and named 28th Middlesex (London Irish) Rifle Volunteer Corps. In 1880 it was renumbered the 16th Middlesex Rifle Volunteers.

During the Second Boer War, the battalion sent eight officers and 200 non-commissioned officers and private soldiers for active service. Captain EG Concannon won the Distinguished Service Order (DSO). In recognition of their service, the London Irish was granted their first battle honour, "South Africa, 1900-1902". In 1908, the London Irish was transferred to the Territorial Force and renamed the 18th (County of London) Battalion, the London Regiment (London Irish Rifles).

=== First World War ===
The 1st battalion was mobilised in August 1914, at the start of the First World War at the Duke of York's Headquarters. It landed at Le Havre as part of the 5th London Brigade in the 2nd London Division. The 2nd battalion landed in France in June 1916 in the 180th Brigade in the 60th (2/2nd London) Division. The 2nd battalion served on the Salonika front from December 1916 to June 1917 and then join the Egyptian Expeditionary Force for the advance to Jericho.

At the Battle of Loos, the 1st Battalion LIR particularly distinguished itself. While storming across No-Man's Land to capture the enemy trenches, Rifleman Frank Edwards, the Captain of the football team, kicked a football along in front of the troops as they approached the German lines. Some 1,016 London Irishmen were killed during the conflict.

=== Inter-war ===
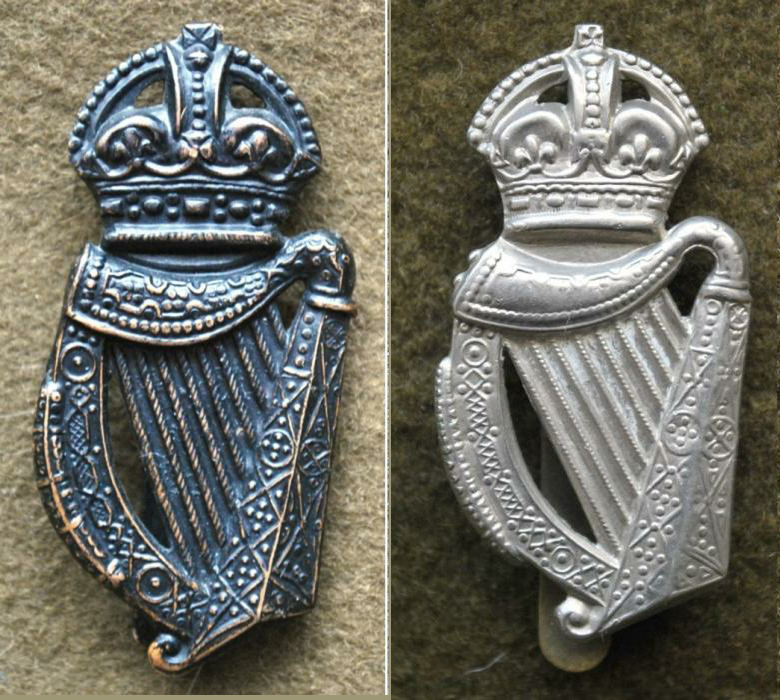
Cap badge variations between WW1 (Left) and WW2 (Right)

After the cessation of hostilities, the LIR was reduced to cadre strength, before being disbanded in May 1919 at Felixstowe. In February 1920, the 18th (County of London) Battalion of the London Regiment (London Irish Rifles) was reconstituted as a component of the 47th (2nd London) Infantry Division of the new Territorial Army, and in 1923, the designation of the Regiment was shortened to 18th London Regiment (London Irish Rifles).

In 1937, when the London Regiment was disbanded, the unit became known as London Irish Rifles, the Royal Ulster Rifles. After the 47th Division was also disbanded, the London Irish transferred to the 169th (3rd London) Infantry Brigade, part of 56th (1st London) Infantry Division.

=== Second World War ===
In April 1939, the establishment of the Territorial Army (TA), the British Army's part-time reserve, was doubled in size and the 2nd Battalion, London Irish Rifles was reformed, initially as a component unit of the 4th London Infantry Brigade, part of the 2nd London Infantry Division which was a 2nd Line duplicate of the 1st Line 1st London Infantry Division.

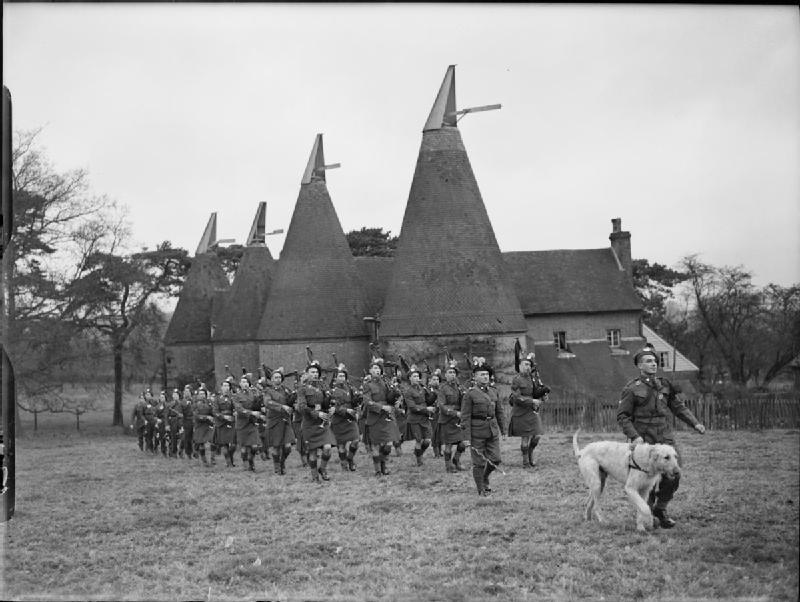
The Pipe Band of the London Irish Rifles on parade with their Irish Wolfhound mascot, near Royal Tunbridge Wells, Kent, 31 December 1940.

The 70th (Young Soldiers) Battalion, a Young Soldiers unit of the London Irish Rifles, was also formed, early in 1940, and set up for young men volunteering who were between the ages of eighteen and nineteen and a half. The objective of the battalion was to train the soldiers to the highest standard of drill, skill-at-arms, discipline and turnout in preparation for the time when they would, in theory, be fit to take their place within the 1st and 2nd Battalions. The 70th (Young Soldiers) Battalion ceased to exist in January 1943, when all such units were disbanded.

A company of the 1st Battalion was involved in the Battle of Graveney Marsh, in September 1940 the last ground combat between a foreign invading force and British troops that happened on British mainland soil.

The 1st Battalion, London Irish Rifles formed part of the 1st London Infantry Brigade, itself part of the 1st London Division. In November 1940 the battalion transferred to the 2nd London Brigade, which was soon renumbered as the 168th (London) Infantry Brigade, due to the division's redesignation as the 56th (London) Infantry Division. From the outbreak of the Second World War in September 1939 until late July 1942, the battalion was in training, mainly in southeast England. The battalion left England in August 1942 to serve in the Middle East. In April 1943 the battalion, together with the rest of the 168th Brigade, was temporarily transferred to the 50th (Northumbrian) Infantry Division and fought in the Allied invasion of Sicily, codenamed Operation Husky, in July/August. The battalion, as part of the 168th Brigade, returned to the 56th Division in Italy in October, and took part in major actions during the Italian Campaign at Fosso Bottacetto south of Catania, Monte Camino, Monte Damiano, the Garagliano crossing during the first Battle of Monte Cassino and Aprilia (Anzio), and at the Gothic Line, and, transferring back to the 167th Brigade, the battalion played a leading role in the final Allied offensive in Northern Italy during April 1945. In the month that they spent fighting in the Anzio beachhead, the 1st Battalion's casualties totalled 600 officers and other ranks killed, wounded and missing. Some 700 men of the London Irish Rifles were killed in action during the Second World War.

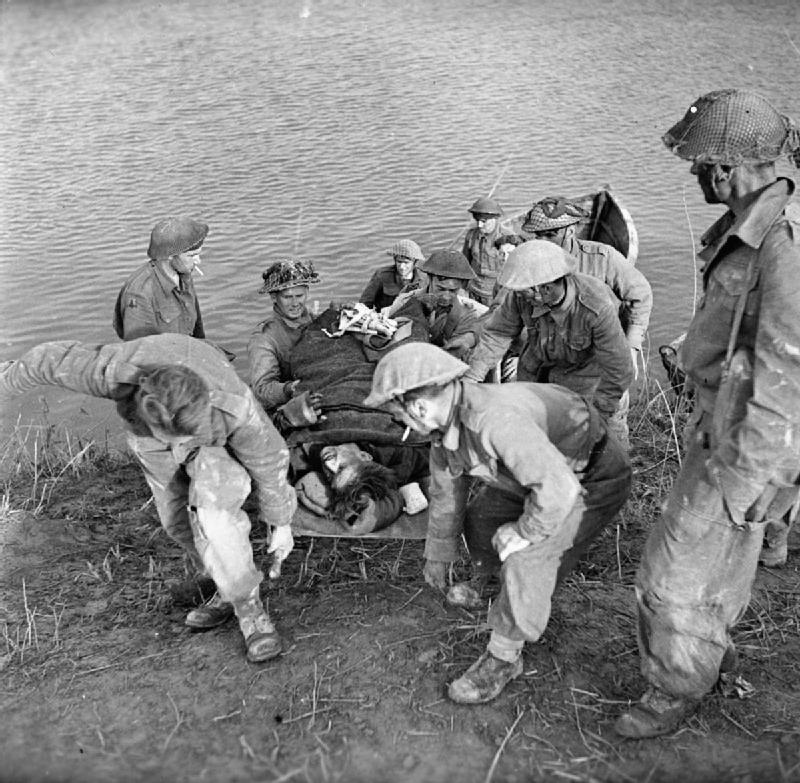
A casualty is brought back across the River Reno during operations by 'C' Company of the 1st Battalion, London Irish Rifles to establish a bridgehead across the river, 6 April 1945.

The 2nd Battalion formed part of the 38th (Irish) Brigade, initially as part of 6th Armoured Division and later within the 78th Battleaxe Division, a division with an excellent reputation, and was in front line service from November 1942 to May 1945 throughout Tunisia and Italy including taking part in major actions at Bou Arada, Heidous, Centuripe, Termoli, Sangro River, the Liri Valley, Trasimeno, Monte Spaduro and at the Argenta Gap. The battalion garrisoned parts of Austria in the immediate post-war period. During the final offensive in Italy the battalion was commanded by Lieutenant Colonel Bala Bredin.

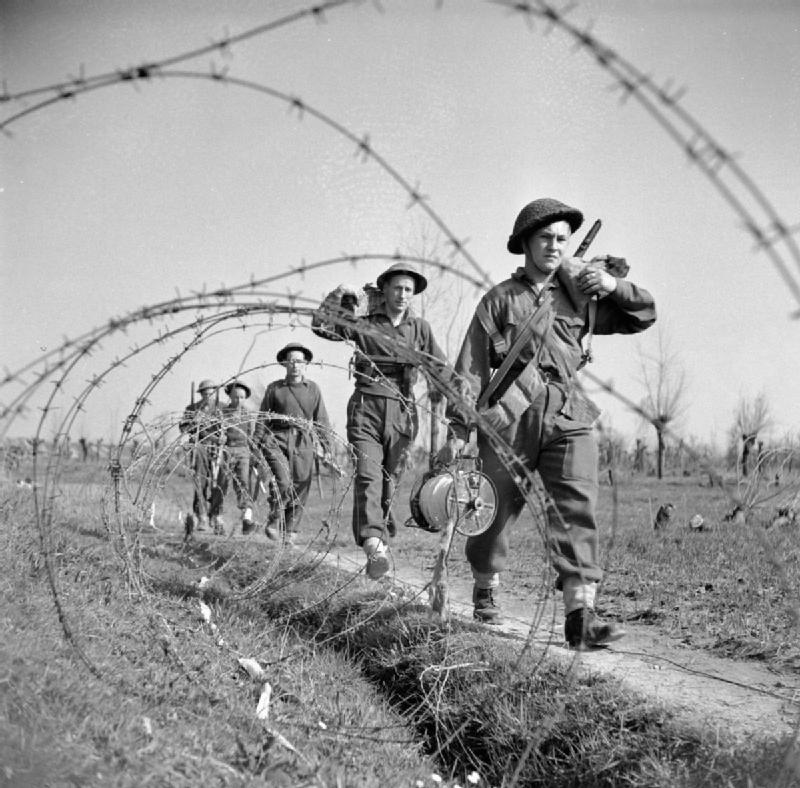
Infantrymen of the 2nd Battalion, London Irish Rifles move forward through barbed wire defences on their way to attack a German strongpoint on the southern bank of the River Senio, Italy, 22 March 1945.

=== Post war ===
After the war, the battalion re-formed as a battalion of the Royal Ulster Rifles. In 1967, with the disbanding of the London Regiment, the three Irish Regular Infantry Regiments combined to form The Royal Irish Rangers, and the London Irish Rifles became D Company (London Irish Rifles), 4th Battalion The Royal Irish Rangers, remaining so until the re-formation of The London Regiment in 1993.

During Operation Telic, the company contributed to the formation of Cambrai Company (Operation Telic 3) and Messines Company (Operation Telic 4). Soldiers from the company also deployed to Afghanistan with Somme Company in 2007 (Operation Herrick 7), Amiens Company in 2010 (Operation Herrick 12) and Arras Company in 2011 (Operation Herrick 13).

The London Irish Rifles moved from their historic home, Duke of York's Headquarters, Chelsea to Flodden Road, Camberwell in 2000.

== Battle honours ==
The regiment's battle honours were as follows:

- Second Boer War: South Africa 1900-02
- First World War: Festubert 1915, Loos, Somme 1916 '18, Flers-Courcelette, Morval, Messines 1917, Ypres 1917, Langemarck 1917, Cambrai 1917, St. Quentin, Bapaume 1918, Ancre 1918, Albert 1918, Pursuit to Mons, France and Flanders 1915–18, Doiran 1917, Macedonia 1916–17, Gaza, El Mughar, Nebi Samwil, Jerusalem, Jericho, Jordan, Palestine 1917-18
- Second World War: Bou Arada, El Hadjeba, Stuka Farm, Heidous, North Africa 1942–43, Lentini, Simeto Bridgehead, Adrano, Centuripe, Salso Crossing, Simeto Crossing, Malleto, Pursuit to Messina, Sicily 1943, Termoli, Trigno, Sangro, Fossacesia, Teano, Monte Camino, Calabritto, Carigliano Crossing, Damiano, Anzio, Carroceto, Cassino II, Casa Sinagogga, Liri Valley, Trasimene Line, Sanfatucchio, Coriano, Croce, Senio Floodbank, Rimini Line, Ceriano Ridge, Monte Spaduro, Monte Grande, Valli di Commacchio, Argenta Gap, Italy 1943-45

== Notable members ==
- Mike Hoare
- Nigel Stock

== Memorials ==
As of 2014, the main memorial to the unit's dead in the world wars is now located in the drill hall at the Army Reserve Centre at Connaught House, 4 Flodden Road, Camberwell.

== See also ==
- Irish regiment
- Irish Guards
- Royal Irish Regiment
- London Regiment

== Sources ==
- Joslen, Lt-Col H.F. (2003). Orders of Battle, United Kingdom and Colonial Formations and Units in the Second World War, 1939–1945. Uckfield: Naval & Military. ISBN 1-84342-474-6.
