= Trevor Evans (priest) =

Anglican priest (1937–2020)

Trevor Owen Evans (10 July 1937 - 30 June 2020) was an eminent Anglican priest in the last decades of the 20th century and the early part of the 21st.

Born in Tywyn on 10 July 1937 he was educated at Dolgellau Boys' Grammar School and UCW, Aberystwyth, where he read geology. He trained for ordination at the College of the Resurrection, Mirfield, and was ordained deacon in 1961 and priest in 1962. He was curate in Barmouth until 1964 and curate then vicar in Llandudno until 1975. He then spent a further 14 years in charge at Llanidloes with Llangurig, during which time he was appointed diocesan advisor on spirituality and in 1982 was made a prebendary of Bangor Cathedral. He also served as diocesan director of ordinands from 1989 to 1999 while incumbent at Trefdraeth and subsequently Llanfairpwllgwyngyll with Penmynydd before being appointed as Dean of Bangor in 1998 by Barry Morgan.

He retired in 2004 and continued to live in Bangor until his death on 30 June 2020, aged 82. He was married to Chris, with whom he had a son and daughter and who survived him.

Church in Wales titles
Preceded by Thomas Edwards	Dean of Bangor; 1998–2004	Succeeded by Alun Hawkins
