= Thomas Edward (naturalist) =

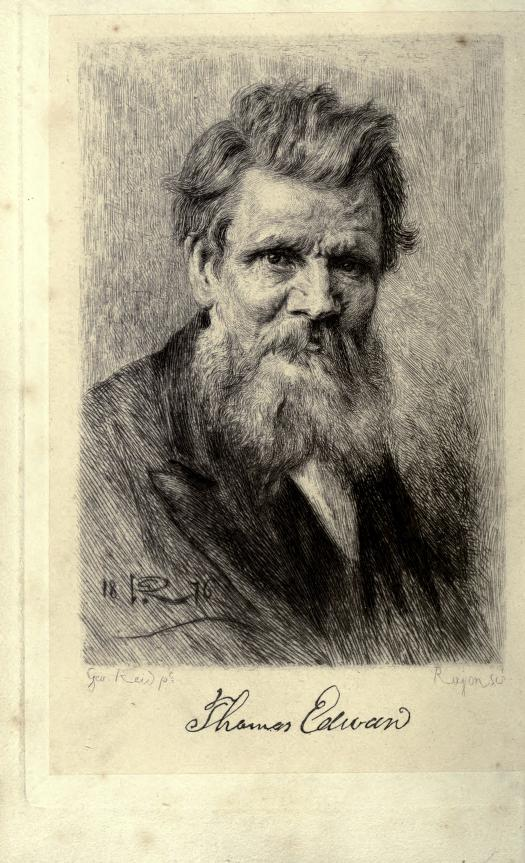
Portrait by George Reid

Thomas Edward (1814–1886) was a Scottish naturalist born in Gosport. He was trained as a shoemaker and eventually settled in Banff, where he devoted his leisure time to the study of animal nature, and collected numerous specimens of animals, which he stuffed and exhibited, but with monetary loss. Samuel Smiles, his biographer, describes him as "one of those men who lived for science, not by science."

The Queen's attention being called to his case, she settled on him an annual pension of £50, while the citizens of Aberdeen presented him in March 1877 with a gift of 130 sovereigns (£130).

The story of his life and work was recorded in Life of a Scotch Naturalist, Thomas Edward, associate of the Linnean Society, written by Samuel Smiles, illustrated by George Reid and published by John Murray in 1876 (nine editions were published between 1876 and 1889). His portrait is held in the National Portrait Gallery.

To give an example of the importance of his contribution to science, Smiles states that A History of the British Sessile-eyed Crustacea by Charles Spence Bate and John Obadiah Westwood (published in two volumes; 1863–1868) contains information on 177 species that were collected by Edward in the Moray Firth, of which twenty were new to science.

Edward contributed to The Zoologist over a long period. For instance in 1859 he wrote a small notice about the "occurrence of the Great Ash-coloured Shrike (Lanius excubitor) in Banffshire." In 1877 he wrote messages about "Asterina gibbosa on the coast of Banffshire" and about the "Bearded Tit and Hawfinch in Aberdeenshire."

== Sources ==
- Smiles, Samuel (1876). Life of a Scotch naturalist, Thomas Edward, associate of the Linnean Society. London: John Murray. (review in: The Zoologist, 3rd series, vol 1 (1877), issue 2, February—section 'Notices of New Books,' pp. 71–76.)
