= John Sym =

Scottish minister (1809–1855)

- Church: Greyfriars' Free church
- Successor: William Chalmers (1824-1857)
- Previous post: Old Greyfriar's Church (1834-1843)

Orders
- Ordination: 6 June 1833

Personal details
- Born: 19 January 1809 Paisley, Scotland
- Died: 28 January 1855 (aged 46) Edinburgh, Scotland
- Denomination: Free Church of Scotland
- Spouse: Catherine Glassford Munro
- Children: James Sym (b. 1837), Margaret Scott Sym (b. 1840), Jane Melvill Sym (b. 1842), Catherine Sym (b. 1846), Mary Agnes Sym (b. 1848), Georgina Violet Sym (b. 1851), and Henrietta Wilson Sym (b. 1853)
- Education: University of Glasgow

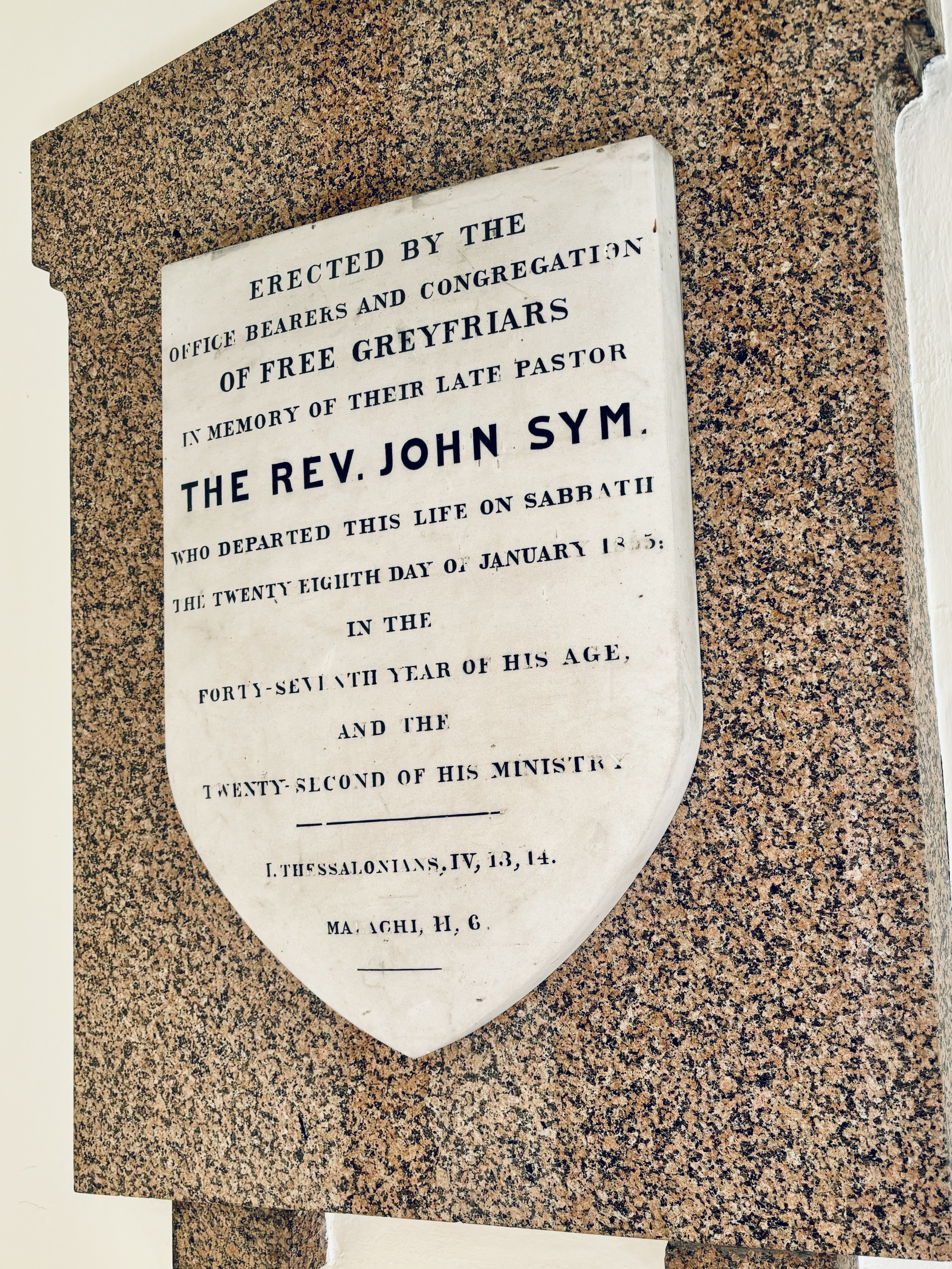
Memorial plaque of John Sym in Buccleuch Free Church, Edinburgh

John Sym (19 January 1809 – 28 January 1855) was a Scottish Presbyterian minister of the Free Greyfrair's Church. He served as the minister of Old Greyfriars' Church in Edinburgh before joining the Free Church during the Disruption of 1843.

== Life ==
Sym was licensed to preach by the Presbytery of Glasgow in 1832, and his early ministry included preaching in St. Enoch's Church, Glasgow, during a vacancy. His sermons were highly regarded despite his youth, earning him recognition for his maturity and depth of insight.

== Disruption of 1843 and the Free Church ==
In his time at Greyfriars', John Sym's ministry became closely linked with that of the prominent preacher Thomas Guthrie, who served as his assistant minister, holding the second charge at Old Greyfriars'. Both ministers played an influential role during the Disruption of 1843, when they, along with the majority of the congregation, left the Church of Scotland to form the Free Church of Scotland. This event was motivated by disputes over the independence of the church from state control, particularly in the appointment of ministers. This split marked a pivotal moment for the church, with Sym continuing to minister to the congregation, later known as the Free Greyfriars’.

Additionally, James Julius Wood, the minister of New Greyfriars’, also supported the Free Church but was laid aside by illness at the time of the Disruption. From 1843 to 1844, Wood co-ministered with Sym at Free Greyfriars’, and the two congregations temporarily united under Sym's leadership. Though the congregations worshipped separately in various halls and at Buccleuch Free Church, they later consolidated when the Free Greyfriars’ congregation opened their church on Graham Street (now Keir Street) in November 1884 during the ministry of Rev. Archibald Smellie. Eventually, in 1897, the congregation united with Free Buccleuch under the ministry of late Rev D. M. Macalister, and the Graham Street building was sold. Sym's legacy in the Free Greyfriars’ congregation is thus intertwined with the broader history of the Disruption and the formation of a new spiritual community in Edinburgh.

Sym also conducted the Church History class in the New College, Edinburgh during the late illness of Dr David Welsh.

Sym was also involved in the creation of Chalmers’ Territorial Church, a project initiated by Thomas Chalmers aimed at providing for the spiritual and material needs of the poorest areas of Edinburgh.

=== Convener of the Home Mission Committee ===
He was appointed Convener of the Home Mission Committee. In this role, he oversaw efforts to support and evangelize underserved communities across Scotland. His last public act was preaching at his own mission station at Leven Lodge, reflecting his lifelong commitment to outreach.

== Personal life ==
John Sym married Catherine Glassford Munro on 28 June 1836. The couple had several children, including Major-General Sir John Munro Sym, K.C.B. (born 1839). Sym's eldest son, James, born in 1837, died in infancy. His daughters were Margaret Scott Sym (b. 1840), Jane Melvill Sym (b. 1842), Catherine Sym(b. 1846), Mary Agnes Sym (b. 1848), Georgina Violet Sym (b. 1851), and Henrietta Wilson Sym (b. 1853).

== Death and legacy ==
On 28 January 1855, Rev. John Sym died from an infection. He was 46 years old and was in the 22nd year of his ministry. Buried in the old Greyfrairs Kirkyard.

== Publications ==
- The Claims and Grievances of the Church of Scotland briefly stated. Edinburgh: John Johnstone, 1843.
- Address of the Free Protesting Church of Scotland to Scotsmen, and others residing in the British colonies, attached to the standards of the Church of Scotland. Toronto: G. Brown, 1844.
- Suggestions for members of the evangelistic deputation. Edinburgh, 1855?

Following Sym's death, a posthumous volume of his sermons was published in 1856 along with by a memoir.
