= Frank Edwards (British Army soldier) =

British Army soldier (1893–1964)

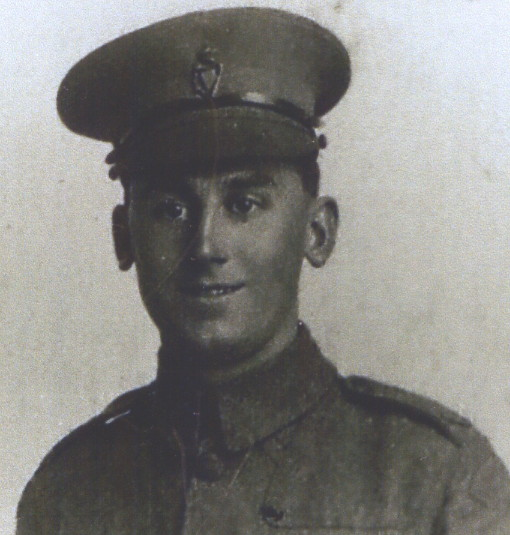
- Born: 29 September 1893; Chelsea, London, England
- Died: January 1964 (aged 70); Whitton, London, England
- Military career
- Allegiance: United Kingdom
- Branch: British Army
- Service years: 1914–1935
- Rank: Sergeant
- Nickname: "The Footballer of Loos"
- Service number: 1751
- Units: London Irish Rifles; Corps of Military Police
- Conflicts: World War I; Battle of Loos

Frank Edwards (29 September 1893 – January 1964), also known as The Footballer of Loos, was a British Army soldier in the First World War who served as a rifleman in the 1st Battalion, London Irish Rifles, during the Battle of Loos. He is distinguished for leading the London Irish across no man's land to storm enemy trenches kicking a football ahead of the troops. The successful capture of enemy positions that followed earned the London Irish Rifles their second battle honour, Loos, 1915. The football is still preserved in the regimental museum of the London Irish and to this day the memory of Edwards is commemorated on Loos Sunday.

== Biography ==
Edwards was born into a working-class family in Chelsea, London. He married, but his wife and child both died in 1913. On the outbreak of the war in August 1914 he was working as a stationer's assistant, but promptly enlisted in the 1st Battalion, London Irish Rifles, who were based at the Duke of York's Barracks on the King's Road, Chelsea. A keen footballer, Edwards soon became captain of his battalion's football team, and led them to victory in the Brigade Final, only days before they were sent to France in March 1915.

The 1st London Irish first saw action during the Battle of Festubert in May 1915, and by September, were stationed close to the village of Loos. Concerns about the Christmas truce of 1914, and the football matches played by both sides, had led to the banning of footballs on the front line, with many senior officers regarding socialising with the enemy as something near mutiny. However, the 1st London Irish had several footballs concealed among the ranks, of which all but one were deliberately punctured by an officer the night before "the big push". Early on 25 September 1915, as the 1st London Irish were waiting to launch the attack, Edwards inflated his football and as they went "over the top" kicked it out into no man's land, calling "Play up London Irish!". The ball was kicked towards the German front lines by several of his fellow soldiers as they advanced. Edwards himself was wounded in the thigh after advancing only a short distance, and also suffered from the effects of the chlorine gas that the British were using for the first time to cover their advance. He was evacuated to a hospital in England.

Edwards returned to active duty in late 1916, gaining Physical Training and Instructors certificates. He was discharged on 5 February 1919, but immediately re-enlisted into the Military Foot Police (which became the Corps of Military Police in February 1926) where he was promoted to Sergeant. On 24 September 1926, the eleventh anniversary of the battle was marked by a Torchlight Tattoo at the regimental headquarters, and included a recreation of the battle of Loos with Edwards again kicking a football to begin the charge. Edwards eventually left the army in 1935, and in 1937 became a NSPCC Inspector in Bridgend, South Wales. He and his family returned to Twickenham, London, in late 1943, where Edwards worked as a swimming instructor, an office manager, and at the Royal Military School of Music. His second wife died in 1956, and the following year he moved to Whitton to live with his daughter. He died there in January 1964.

In October 2012, Edwards was commemorated on the pub sign of "The Rifleman" pub in Twickenham.

== The Football of Loos ==
Edwards' football was found after the battle, lodged in the German barbed wire, and was on display at the regimental museum in London up until the 1970s, when it was put into storage in the sergeant's mess and forgotten. Enquiries about the ball in 2011 led to its rediscovery in a very poor condition, and at risk of disintegrating completely. It was sent to the Leather Conservation Centre in Northampton for repairs and restoration, and has since been on display at the London Irish Rifles Association museum.

In October 2014, it appeared on the television programme Antiques Roadshow where it was valued at up to £15,000. In May 2015, the Royal Mail issued a set of First World War commemorative stamps, one of which featured The Football of Loos.
