= Charles John Guthrie, Lord Guthrie =

Scottish judge and lawyer (1849–1920)

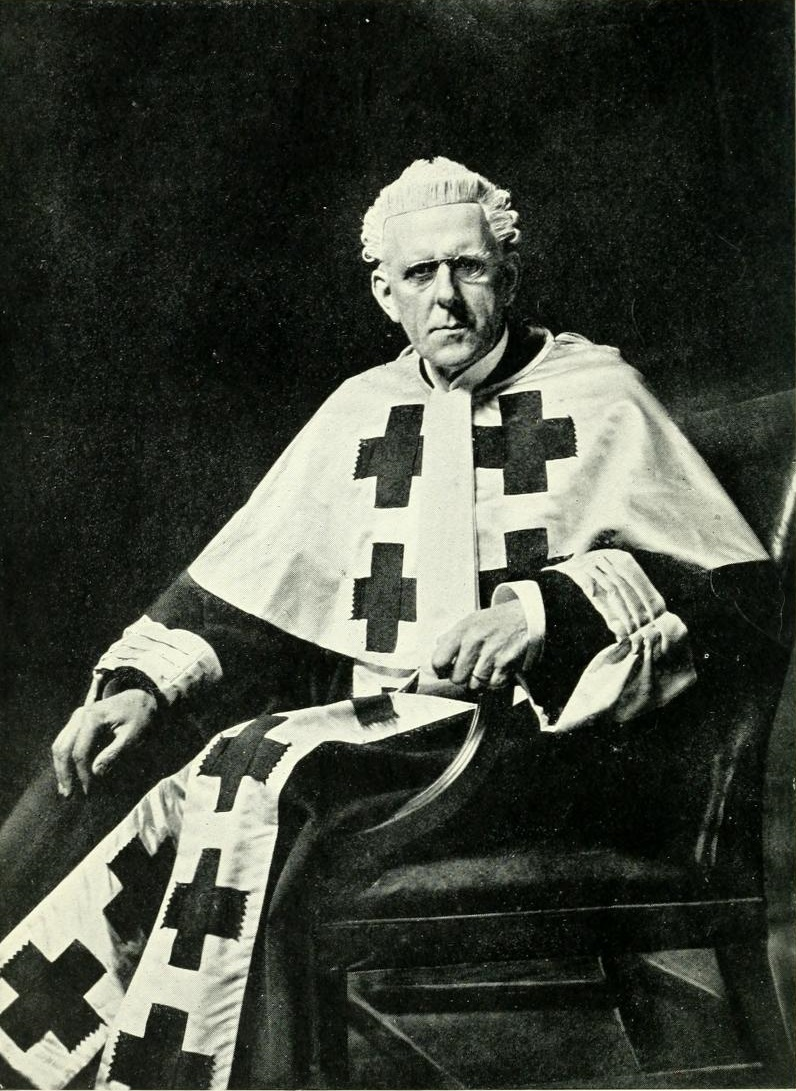
- Born: 4 April 1849; Edinburgh
- Died: 28 April 1920 (aged 71); Edinburgh
- Occupations: Judge, Lawyer
- Spouse: Anne Jemima Burns (m. 1876)

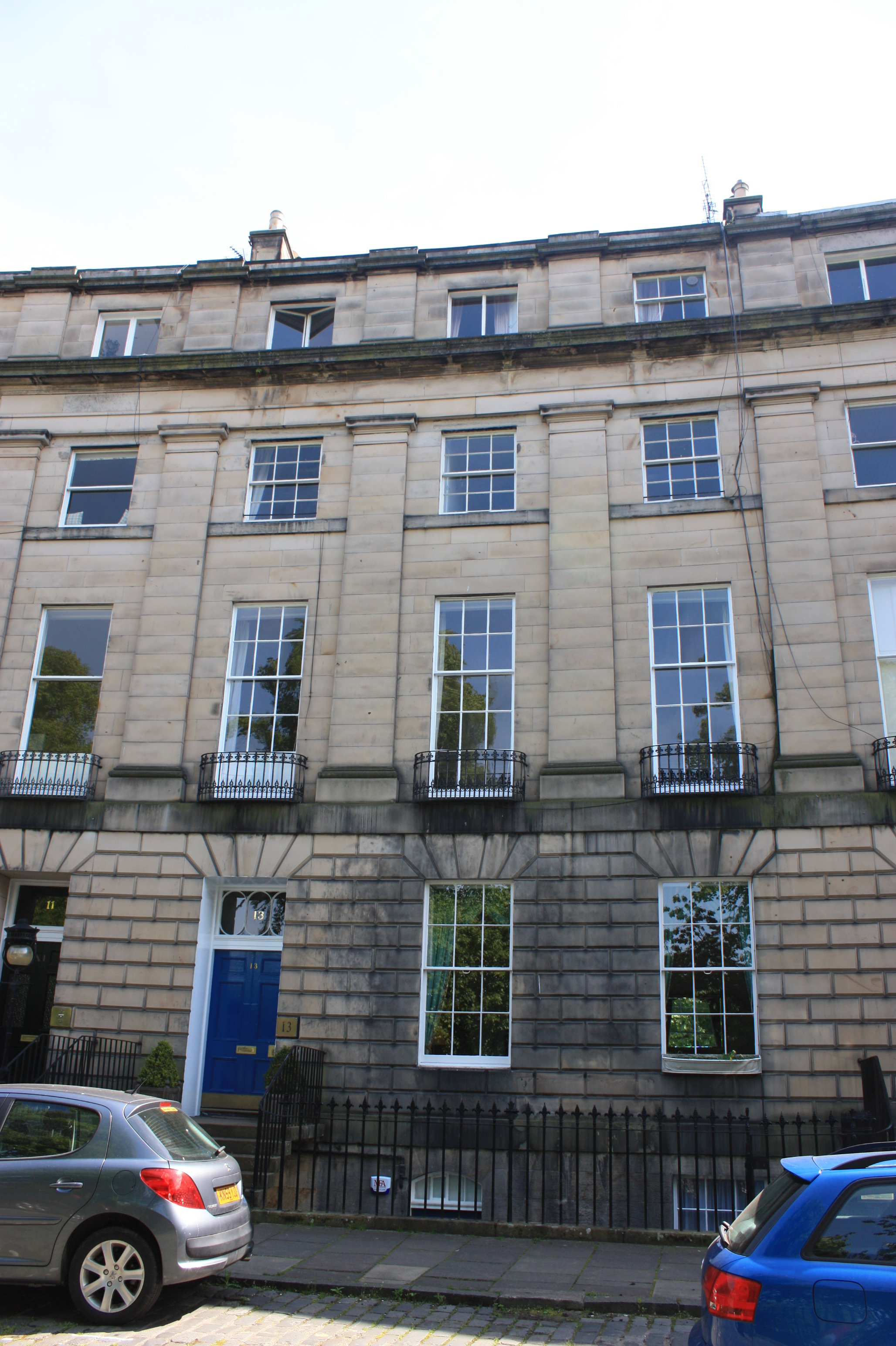
Guthrie's house at 13 Royal Circus, Edinburgh

Charles John Guthrie, Lord Guthrie FRSE FRSGS LLD (4 April 1849 – 28 April 1920) was a Scottish judge and lawyer.

== Life ==
Guthrie was born at 2 Lauriston Lane in Edinburgh, the son of Rev Thomas Guthrie, a major figure in Scottish church history. By 1860 the family had moved to 1 Salisbury Road, a large villa in south Edinburgh.

He was educated at Edinburgh Academy, and then studied Law at Edinburgh University, graduating around 1871. In 1875, he was admitted to the Faculty of Advocates. From 1881 to 1900, he was legal adviser to the Church of Scotland, and in 1897, became a Q.C. From 1900 to 1907 he served as Sheriff of Ross and Cromarty.

In 1907, he was appointed a Senator of the College of Justice. Lord Guthrie was a member of the Royal Commissions on Historical Monuments in Scotland (1908) and on Divorce and Matrimonial Causes (1909), and was Chairman of the Houseletting Commission (1906–07). In 1909, he presided over the trial of Oscar Slater. Guthrie made prejudicial and pejorative comments during his summing up, leading to a miscarriage of justice. Slater was released and pardoned 20 years later.

When he was young, Guthrie had been a friend of Robert Louis Stevenson. In 1914 he published an appreciation of "Cummy" (Stevenson's Nurse), and "Robert Louis Stevenson: Some Personal Recollections" (Edinburgh: W. Green, 1920). His other works include John Knox and his House (1898), and an edition of Knox's History of the Reformation in Scotland (1898), besides contributions to the memoir of his father, Thomas Guthrie (1875). From 1910 to 1919, he was President of the Boys' Brigade of Great Britain and Ireland, and was a member of various antiquarian societies.

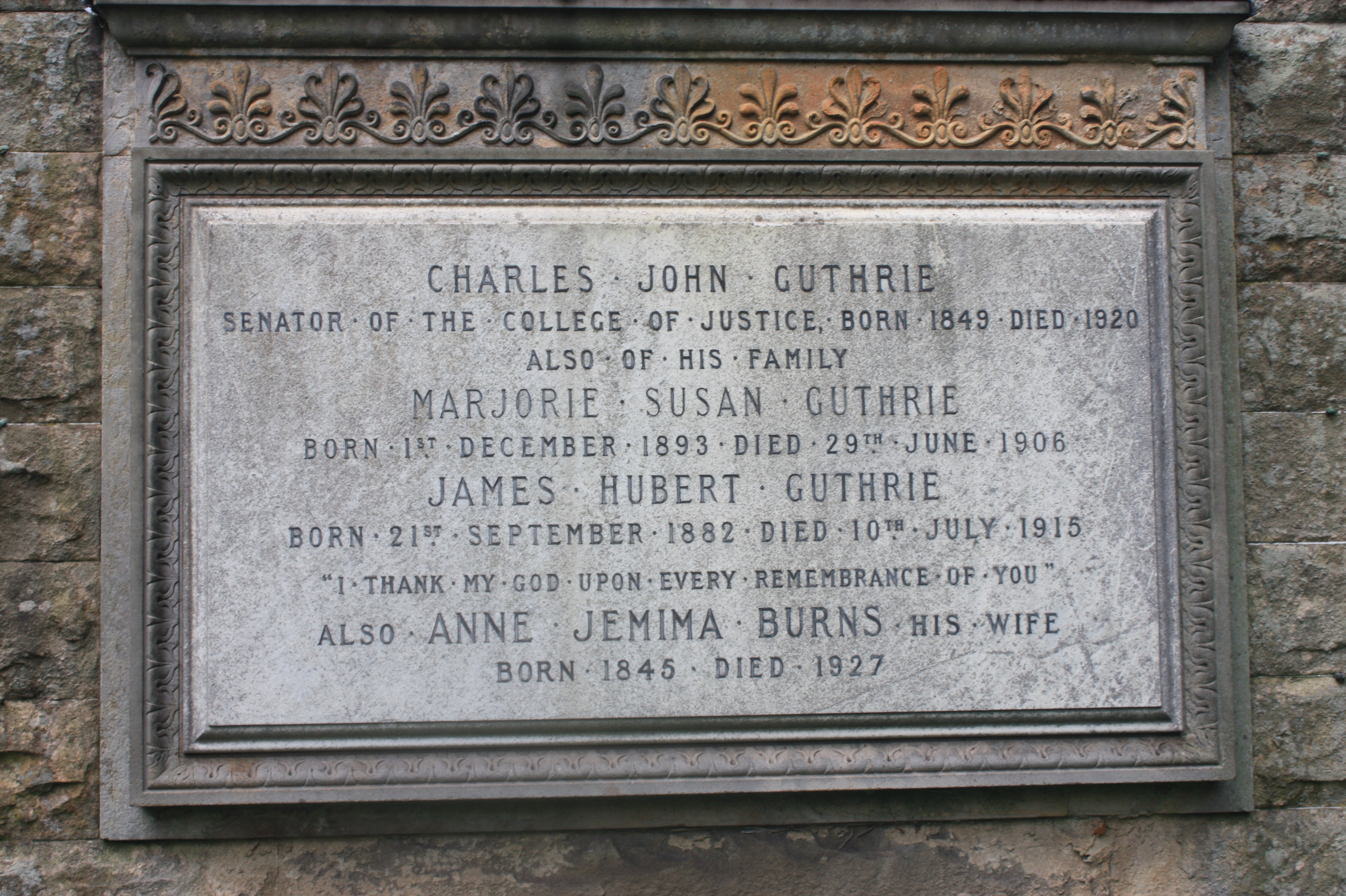
The grave of Charles John Guthrie, Dean Cemetery

In 1916 he was elected a Fellow of the Royal Society of Edinburgh. His proposers were John Horne, Sir William Turner, Sir John Macdonald, Lord Kingsburgh, and John George Bartholomew.

Lord Guthrie died at his home, 13 Royal Circus in Edinburgh, on 28 April 1920. He is buried in the north-west corner of the north section of Dean Cemetery.

== Family ==
In 1876 Guthrie married his cousin, Anne Jemima Burns (1845–1927), the daughter of Rev Dr James Chalmers Burns of Kirkliston, and they had two sons and three daughters to the marriage.

== Bibliography ==
- Guthrie, Charles John (1902). Genealogy of the descendants of Rev. Thomas Guthrie, D.D., and Mrs. Anne Burns or Guthrie : connected chiefly with the families of Chalmers and Trail, to which Mrs. Guthrie belonged, through her mother, Mrs. Christiana Chalmers or Burns, and her great-grandmother, Mrs. Susannah Trail or Chalmers : also incidental references to the families of Guthrie and Burns: comp. from family records, letters, diaries. Edinburgh: A. Elliott.
