= Thomas Edwards (priest) =

Anglican priest (1933–2011)

Thomas Erwyd Pryse Edwards (26 January 1933 – 11 March 2011) was a Welsh Anglican priest.

== Biography ==
Born on 26 January 1933 and educated at St David’s College, Lampeter, he was ordained in 1958. After a curacy in Caernarfon, he was Assistant Chaplain of St George’s Hospital, London, 1963 to 1966. From 1966 to 1972, he was Chaplain of King’s College Hospital, London. He then held incumbencies at Penmon, 1972 to 1975, Menai Bridge, 1975 to 1981, and Bangor before being appointed Dean of Bangor in 1988, serving for ten years.

Edwards had two sons, Sion Erwyd and Huw Thomas. He died on 11 March 2011, at the age of 78.

He is buried in the Lady Chapel Bangor Cathedral, the only Dean to be buried in the Cathedral in its 700 year history.

Church in Wales titles
Preceded by Ivor Rees	Dean of Bangor; 1988–1998	Succeeded by Trevor Evans
