= Samuel Smiles =

British author (1812–1904)

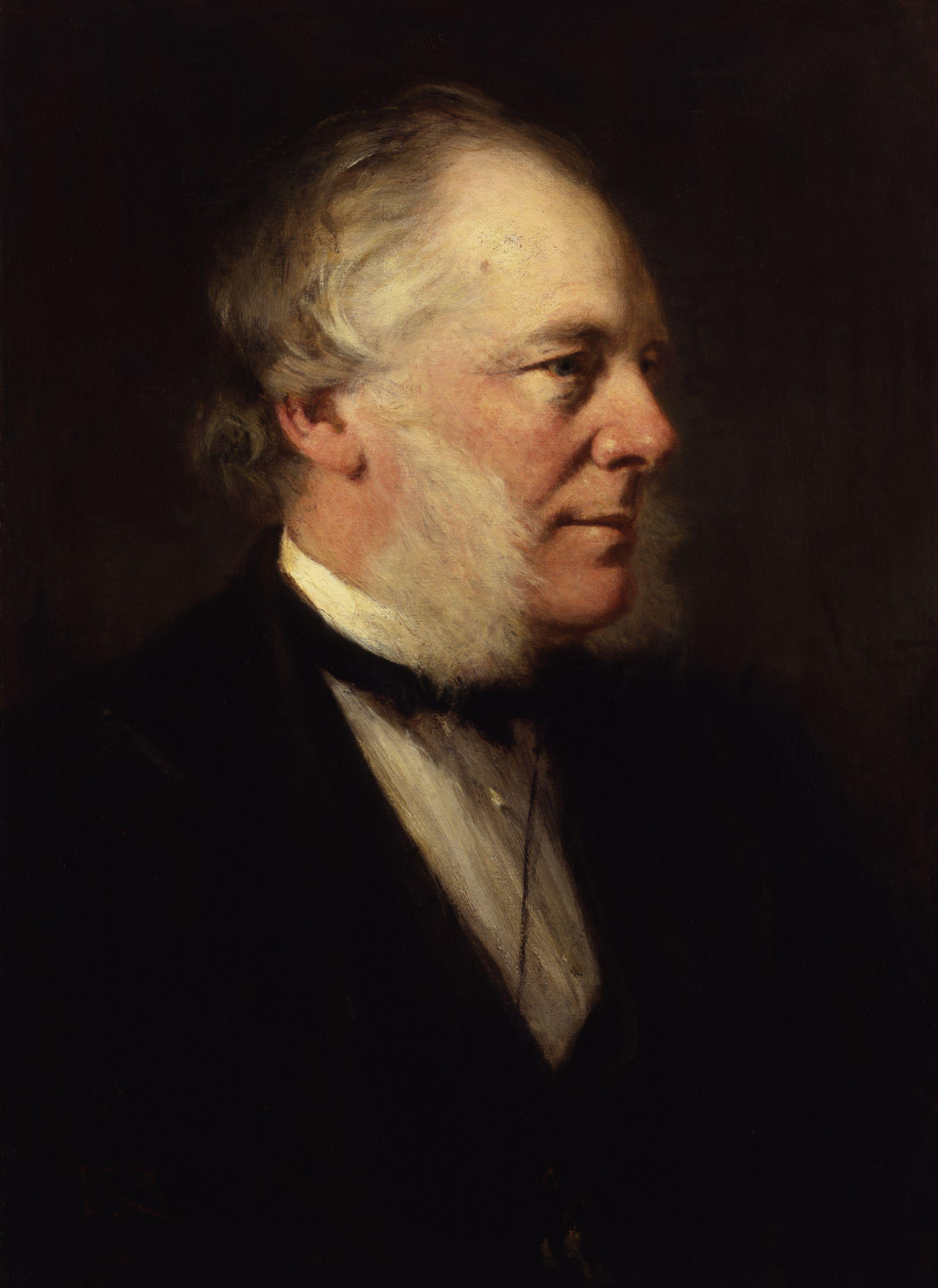
- Portrait by Sir George Reid, 1877
- Born: 23 December 1812; Haddington, East Lothian, Scotland
- Died: 16 April 1904 (age 91); Kensington, London, England
- Education: University of Edinburgh
- Known for: Biographies and self-help books
- Notable work: Self-Help

Samuel Smiles (23 December 1812 – 16 April 1904) was a British author and government reformer. Although he campaigned on a Chartist platform, he promoted the idea that more progress would come from new attitudes than from new laws. His primary work, Self-Help (1859), promoted thrift and claimed that poverty was caused largely by irresponsible habits, while also attacking materialism and laissez-faire government. It has been called "the bible of mid-Victorian liberalism" and had lasting effects on British political thought.

== Early life and education ==
Born in Haddington, East Lothian, Scotland, Smiles was the son of Janet Wilson of Dalkeith and Samuel Smiles of Haddington. He was one of eleven surviving children. While his family members were strict Reformed Presbyterians, he did not practice. He studied at a local school, leaving at the age of 14. He apprenticed to be a doctor under Dr. Robert Lewins. This arrangement enabled Smiles to study medicine at the University of Edinburgh in 1829. There he furthered his interest in politics, and became a strong supporter of Joseph Hume.

His father died in the 1832 cholera epidemic, but Smiles was enabled to continue with his studies because he was supported by his mother. She ran the small family general store firm in the belief that the "Lord will provide". Her example of working ceaselessly to support herself and his nine younger siblings strongly influenced Smiles's future life, but he developed a benign and tolerant outlook that was sometimes at odds with that of his Reformed Presbyterian forebears.

In 1838 Smiles was offered the editorship of the reformist paper, the Leeds Times. He spent the next twenty years in the city, moving to live on Woodhouse Cliff in 1847.

== Career as a campaigner ==
In 1837, he wrote articles for the Edinburgh Weekly Chronicle and the Leeds Times, campaigning for parliamentary reform. In November 1838, Smiles was invited to become the editor of the Leeds Times, a position he accepted and filled until 1842. In May 1840, Smiles became secretary to the Leeds Parliamentary Reform Association, an organisation that held to the six objectives of Chartism: universal suffrage for all men over the age of 21; equal-sized electoral districts; voting by secret ballot; an end to the need of MPs to qualify for Parliament, other than by winning an election; pay for MPs; and annual Parliaments.

As editor of the Leeds Times, he advocated radical causes ranging from women's suffrage to free trade and parliamentary reform. By the late 1840s, however, Smiles became concerned about the advocation of physical force by Chartists Feargus O'Connor and George Julian Harney, although he seems to have agreed with them that the movement's current tactics were not effective, saying that "mere political reform will not cure the manifold evils which now afflict society".

On 7 December 1843, Samuel married Sarah Ann Holmes Dixon in Leeds. They had three daughters and two sons.

In 1845, he left the Leeds Times and became a secretary for the newly formed Leeds & Thirsk Railway. After nine years, he worked for the South Eastern Railway.

In the 1850s, Smiles abandoned his interest in parliament and decided that self-help was the most important place of reform. In 1859, he published his book Self-Help; with Illustrations of Character and Conduct.

Smiles wrote articles for the Quarterly. In an article on railways, he argued that the railways should be nationalised and that third-class passengers should be encouraged. In 1861 Smiles published an article from the Quarterly, renamed Workers Earnings, Savings, and Strikes. He claimed poverty in many instances was caused by habitual improvidence:

Times of great prosperity, in which wages are highest and mills running full time are not times in which Mechanics' Institutes and Schools flourish, but times in which publicans and beer sellers prosper and grow rich ... A workman earning 50s. to 60s. a week (above the average pay of bankers' clerks) was content to inhabit a miserable one-roomed dwelling in a bad neighbourhood, the one room serving as parlour, kitchen, and sleeping-room for the whole family, which consisted of husband, wife, four sons, two cats, and a dog. The witness was asked: Do you think this family was unable to get better lodgings, or were they careless? They were careless, was the reply.

In 1866, Smiles became president of the National Provident Institution but left in 1871, after suffering a debilitating stroke.

The Globe Permanent Benefit Building Society 493 New Cross Road Deptford SE14 Founded 1868 Incorporated 1878. Founded for the mutual benefit of investors and borrowers with the approval of the late Samuel Smiles. The 50th Anniversary Jubilee Report (1 August 1918) states that he was a founding Director and was involved for 3 years. All founders lived in Deptford or the neighbourhood as did the ten successors.

== Writings ==
In 1875, his book Thrift was published. In it, he said that "riches do not constitute any claim to distinction. It is only the vulgar who admire riches as riches". He claimed that the Poor Law Amendment Act 1834 was "one of the most valuable that has been placed on the statute-book in modern times". He also criticised laissez-faire:

When typhus or cholera breaks out, they tell us that Nobody is to blame. That terrible Nobody! How much he has to answer for. More mischief is done by Nobody than by all the world besides. Nobody adulterates our food. Nobody poisons us with bad drink. Nobody supplies us with foul water. Nobody spreads fever in blind alleys and unswept lanes. Nobody leaves towns undrained. Nobody fills gaols, penitentiaries, and convict stations. Nobody makes poachers, thieves, and drunkards. Nobody has a theory too—a dreadful theory. It is embodied in two words—Laissez faire—Let alone. When people are poisoned by plaster of Paris mixed with flour, "Let alone" is the remedy. When Cocculus indicus is used instead of hops, and men die prematurely, it is easy to say, "Nobody did it." Let those who can, find out when they are cheated: Caveat emptor. When people live in foul dwellings, let them alone. Let wretchedness do its work; do not interfere with death.

In 1871, he edited the letters written by his son, Samuel Smiles Jr (born 1852), and sent home during his teenage sea voyage (taken for his health), as well as the log he kept of his journey to Australia and the United States between February 1869 and March 1871, and published them in London in book form, under the title A Boy's Voyage Round the World.

In 1881 he claimed:

Labour is toilsome and its gains are slow. Some people determine to live by the labour of others, and from the moment they arrive at that decision, become the enemies of society. It is not often that distress drives men to crime. In nine cases out of ten, it is choice not necessity. Moral cowardice is exhibited as much in public as in private life. Snobbism is not confined to toadying of the rich, but is quite as often displayed in the toadying of the poor... Now that the "masses" exercise political power, there is a growing tendency to fawn upon them, flatter them, speak nothing but smooth words to them. They are credited with virtues they themselves know they do not possess. To win their favour sympathy is often pretended for views, the carrying out of which is known to be hopeless. The popular agitator must please whom he addresses, and it is always highly gratifying to our self-love to be told that someone else is to blame for what we suffer. So it rarely occurs to these orators to suggest that those whom they address are themselves to blame for what they suffer, or that they misuse the means of happiness which are within their reach ... The capitalist is merely a man who does not spend all that is earned by work.

== Self-Help ==
Smiles was not very successful in his careers as a doctor and journalist. He joined several cooperative ventures, but they failed for lack of capital. Disillusioned, he turned away from middle-class utopianism. He finally found intellectual refuge and national fame in the isolation of self-help.

The origins of his most famous book, Self-Help, lay in a speech he gave in March 1845 in response to a request by a Mutual Improvement Society, published as, The Education of the Working Classes. In it Smiles said:

I would not have any one here think that, because I have mentioned individuals who have raised themselves by self-education from poverty to social eminence, and even wealth, these are the chief marks to be aimed at. That would be a great fallacy. Knowledge is of itself one of the highest enjoyments. The ignorant man passes through the world dead to all pleasures, save those of the senses ... Every human being has a great mission to perform, noble faculties to cultivate, a vast destiny to accomplish. He should have the means of education, and of exerting freely all the powers of his godlike nature.

The newly founded Routledge publishing house rejected publishing Self-Help in 1855. Twenty years later Smiles was seated next to George Routledge at a dinner, and he said to him, "And when, Dr. Smiles, are we to have the honour of publishing one of your books?"; Smiles replied that Mr. Routledge already had the honour of rejecting Self-Help. Although John Murray was willing to publish Self-Help on a half-profits system, Smiles rejected this as he did not want the book to lose its anecdotes. In 1859, Smiles self-published the book, retaining the copyright, while he paid John Murray a ten per cent commission. It sold 20,000 copies within one year of its publication. By the time of Smiles's death in 1904 it had sold over a quarter of a million copies. Self-Help "elevated [Smiles] to celebrity status: almost overnight, he became a leading pundit and much-consulted guru". Smiles "suddenly became the fashion and he was deluged with requests that he should lay foundation stones, sit for his portrait, present prizes to orphan children, make speeches from platforms. The simple fellow was pleased with these invitations, but naturally he could not accept. He had his work to do ... his duty did not lie on any public platform ... It lay in his office with his Work".

== Conduct manuscript ==
Smiles intended to publish a book titled Conduct, in 1896. He submitted it to his publisher, but John Murray declined to publish the book. In 1898, publication was denied again.

After the death of Smiles in 1904, the manuscript of Conduct was found in his desk and, on the advice of John Murray, was destroyed. No copy is known to exist.

== Later life, death and descendants ==
Sir George Reid was commissioned to paint Smiles's portrait, completed in 1877 and now in the collection of the National Gallery, London. Copies of his handwriting can be found in the archives of East Lothian Council.

When, in 1892, William Gladstone returned to power and, as prime minister, introduced his Second Irish Home Rule Bill, Smiles wrote to his son in Ulster: "Don't you rebel. Keep quiet, though I see your name among the agitators ... Your letter is frightfully alarming ... Gladstone has come into power and we are threatened with Civil War. This cannot be the result of good statesmanship. Yet there are Liberal members to cheer on the maniac. Alas, alas for Liberalism! ... Must I give you six months notice to withdraw my loans to the B.R. Co., for I want to keep the little money I have for wife and bairns, not for arming the Ulstermen". Smiles wrote to Lucy Smiles in 1893, "This Home Rule Bill is horrid ... I am quite appalled at that wretched hound, miscalled statesman, throwing the country into a state of turmoil. I cannot understand how so many persons in this part of Britain follow that maniac, just like a flock of sheep. He is simply bursting with self-conceit. Alas! Alas for Liberalism!"

On 16 April 1904, Samuel Smiles died in Kensington in his 92nd year, London and was buried in Brompton Cemetery. Shortly before his death, he was reportedly offered a knighthood, which he declined to accept.

Smiles's grandchildren include Sir Walter Smiles, an Ulster Unionist Party MP. Through that branch of the family, Smiles is also the great-great-grandfather of Bear Grylls, a well-known adventurer.

== Legacy ==
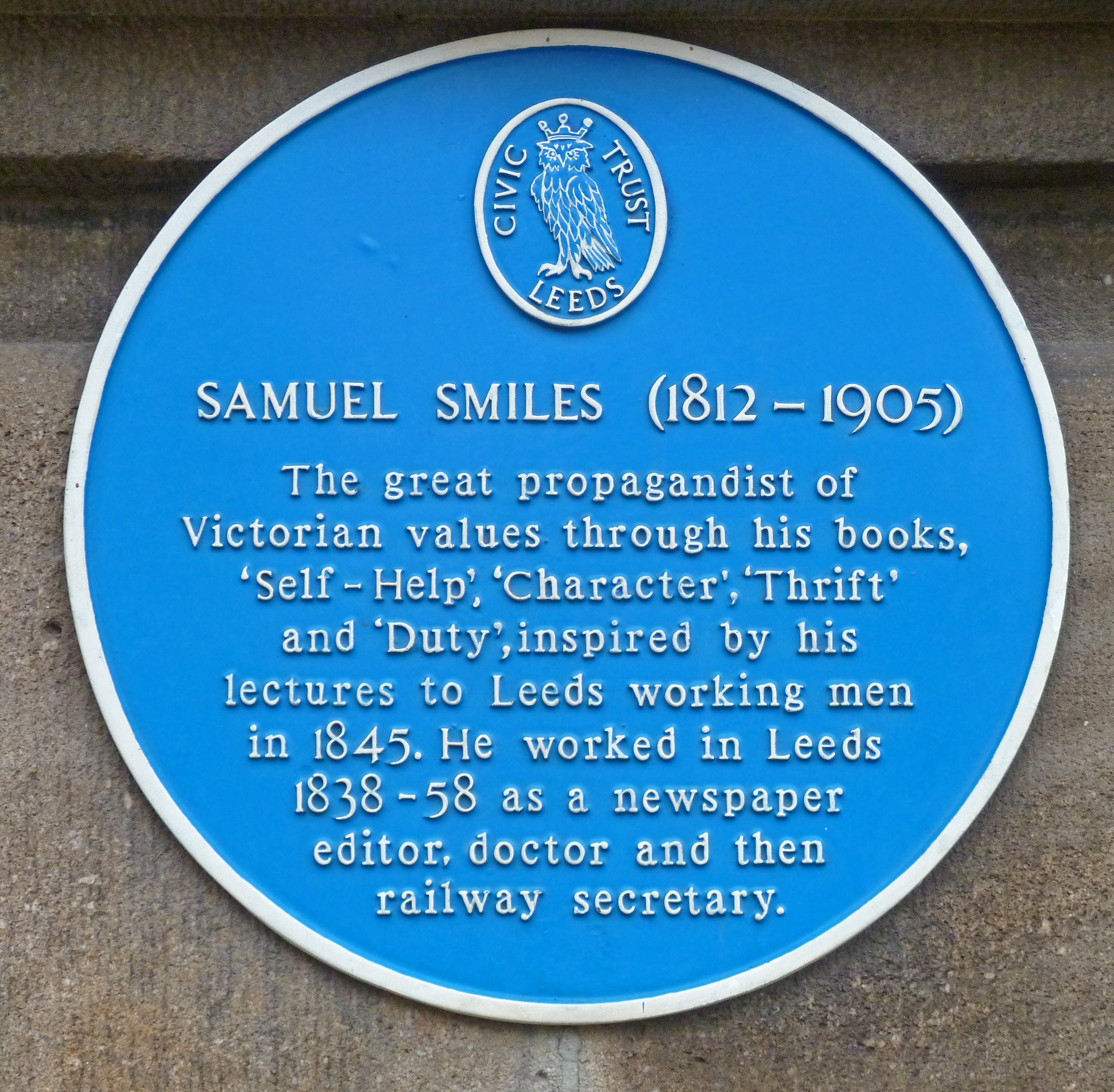
Samuel Smiles (8116935276)

Self-Help has been called "the bible of mid-Victorian liberalism", and it raised Smiles to celebrity status almost overnight.

The Liberal MP J. A. Roebuck in 1862 called Smiles's Workmen's Earnings, Strikes and Savings "a very remarkable book" and quoted passages from it in a speech.

George Bernard Shaw, in his Fabian Essays in Socialism (1889), called Smiles "that modern Plutarch".

American inspirational writer Orison Swett Marden was inspired by Samuel Smiles as a result of having read Self-Help during his youth. Decades later, he wrote Pushing to the Front (1894) and became a professional author as a result of Smiles's influence.

The late nineteenth century and early twentieth century saw the rise of New Liberalism, Keynesian economics, and socialism, which all viewed thrift unfavourably. The New Liberal economists J. A. Hobson and A. F. Mummery in their Physiology of Industry (1889), claimed that saving resulted in the underemployment of capital and labour during trade depressions. General Theory of Employment, Interest and Money (1936) by John Maynard Keynes, attempted to replace classical liberal economics.

Building societies adopted the message of being thrifty to self-improve represented in Thrift. In 1897, The Halifax printed the "Misery Leaflet" in which a worn-out house and a well-off house are each illustrated next to each other under the labels "Want of Thrift" and "Thrift". The leaflet has "Little and often fills the purse.", "Before you marry have a house to live in.", and "Providence will thrive where genius will starve. When fortune smiles take the advantage." written on the margins. In reality, the majority of people could not save because banks did not accept small deposits at the time.

In 1905, William Boyd Carpenter, Bishop of Ripon, praised Smiles: "The Bishop said he had noticed a little tendency in some quarters to disparage the homely energies of life which at one time were so highly thought of. He recalled the appearance of Self-Help, by Samuel Smiles, who 40 or 50 years ago gave lectures at Leeds encouraging young men to engage in self-improvement. His books were read with extraordinary avidity, but there arose a school which taught the existence of the beautiful and to do nothing. That school disparaged thrift and did not pay much attention to character and, perhaps, not much attention to duty".

The Labour MP David Grenfell, in a debate on the Transitional Payments (Determination of Need) Bill, claimed that the 1932 bill "discriminated not against the unthrifty, the idler, and the waster, but against the industrious, thrifty person, who had to pay a heavy penalty. The Minister of Labour penalized self-help. He poured contempt on Samuel Smiles and all his works".

The liberal Ernest Benn invoked Smiles in 1949 when praising the virtues of self-help.

In 1962, the director of the British Institute of Management, John Marsh, said that young men who entered industry needed a sense of service and duty; they must be "men of character who know how to behave well as in phases of success"; they must possess self-discipline in thinking and behaviour: "There is something still to be said for Samuel Smiles's doctrine of self-help".

The liberal economist F. A. Hayek wrote in 1976 that: "It is probably a misfortune that, especially in the USA, popular writers like Samuel Smiles...have defended free enterprise on the ground that it regularly rewards the deserving, and it bodes ill for the future of the market order that this seems to have become the only defence of it which is understood by the general public. That it has largely become the basis of the self-esteem of the businessman often gives him an air of self-righteousness which does not make him more popular".

== Writings ==
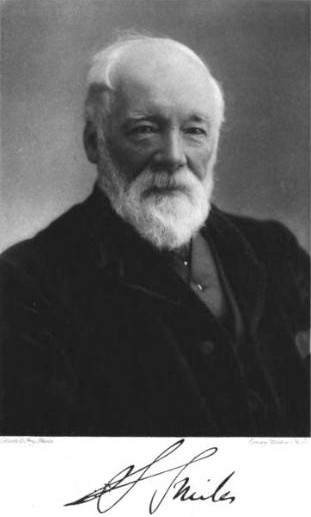

=== Self-help topics ===
- Self-Help, 1859
- Character, 1871
- Thrift, 1875
- Duty, 1880
- Life and Labour, 1887

=== Biographical works ===
- The Life of George Stephenson, 1857
- The Story of The Life of George Stephenson, London, 1859 (abridgement of the above)
- Brief biographies, Boston, 1860 (articles reprinted from periodicals such as the Quarterly Review)
- Lives of the Engineers, 5 vol, London 1862
  - Vol 1, Early engineers – James Brindley, Sir Cornelius Vermuyden, Sir Hugh Myddleton, Capt John Perry
  - Vol 2, Harbours, Lighthouses and Bridges – John Smeaton and John Rennie (1761–1821)
  - Vol 3, History of Roads – John Metcalf and Thomas Telford
  - Vol 4, The Steam Engine – Boulton and Watt
  - Vol 5, The Locomotive – George Stephenson and Robert Stephenson
- Industrial Biography, 1863

Includes lives of Andrew Yarranton, Benjamin Huntsman, Dud Dudley, Henry Maudslay, Joseph Clement, etc..

- Vol 4 Boulton and Watt, 1865
- The Huguenots: Their Settlements, Churches and Industries in England and Ireland, 1867
- The Huguenots in France. 1870
- Lives of the Engineers, new ed. in 5 vols, 1874

(includes the lives of Stephenson and Boulton and Watt)

- Life of a Scotch Naturalist: Thomas Edward, 1875
- George Moore, Merchant and Philanthropist, 1878
- Robert Dick, Baker of Thurso, Geologist and Botanist, 1878
- Men of Invention and Industry, 1884

Phineas Pett, Francis Pettit Smith, John Harrison, John Lombe, William Murdoch, Frederick Koenig, The Walter family of The Times, William Clowes, Charles Bianconi, and chapters on Industry in Ireland, Shipbuilding in Belfast, Astronomers and students in humble life

- James Nasmyth, engineer, an autobiography, ed. Samuel Smiles, 1885
- A Publisher and his Friends. Memoir and Correspondence of the Late John Murray, 1891
- Jasmin. Barber, poet, Philanthropist, 1891
- Josiah Wedgwood, his Personal History, 1894
- The Autobiography of Samuel Smiles, LLD, ed. T. Mackay, 1905 – New York edition

The growth of industrial archaeology and history in Britain from the 1960s caused a number of these titles to be reprinted, and a number are available on the Web from such sources as Project Gutenberg, noted below.
