= John Munro Sym =

British military officer

Major-General Sir John Munro Sym KCB (15 February 1839 – 2 October 1919) was a Scottish military officer who commanded the 5th Gurkha Rifles.

== Life ==
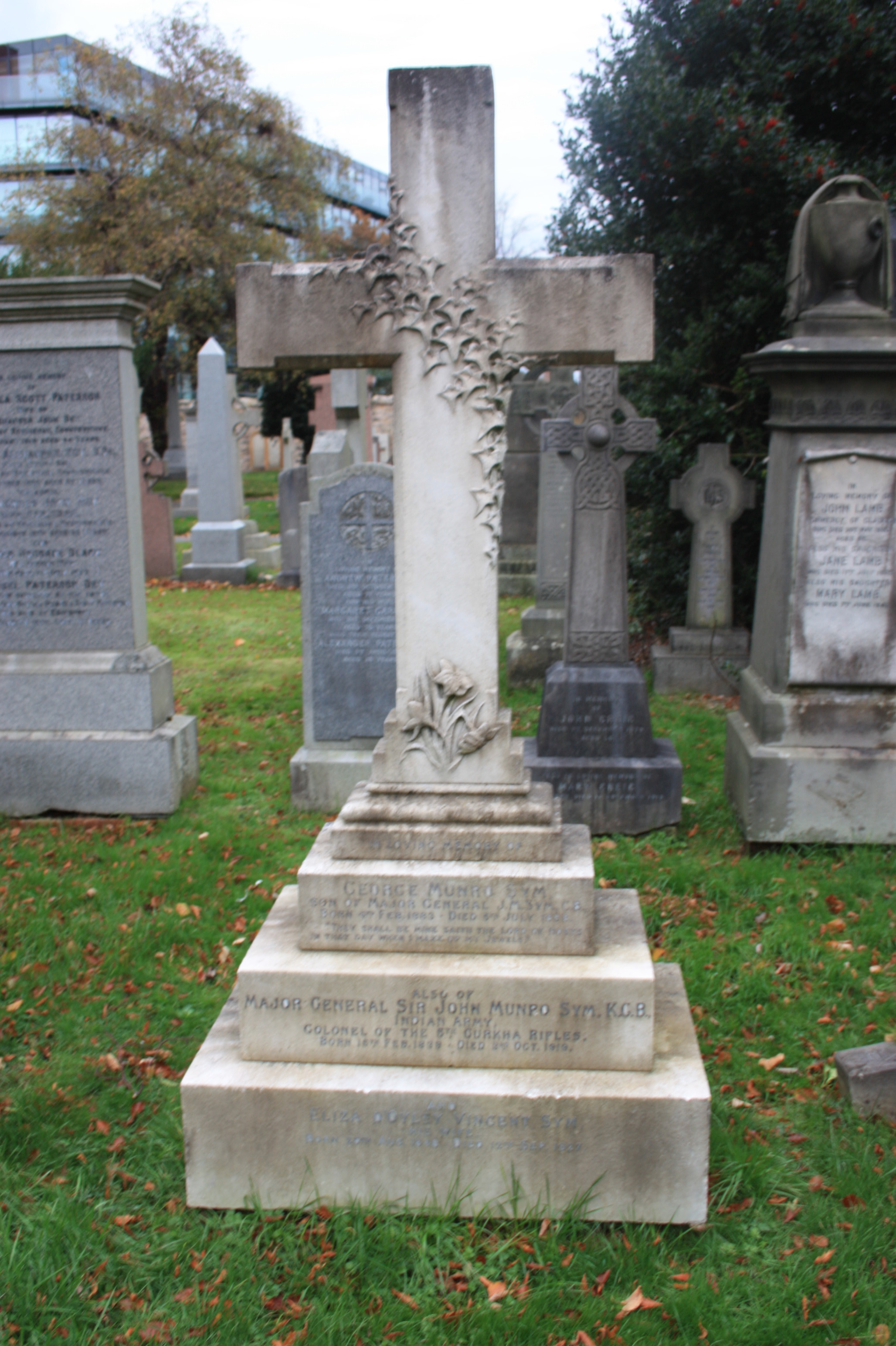
The grave of Major General Sir John Munro Sym, Dean Cemetery, Edinburgh

He was born on 15 February 1839 in Edinburgh one of eight children to Rev John Sym (1809–1855), minister of the famous Greyfriars Kirk, and his wife Catherine Glassford Munro. The family lived at 37 George Square a short distance from the church.

He trained as a soldier and spent most of his career in the Indian Army.

In 1910 he was living at 4 Belgrave Place in western Edinburgh.

He died in Edinburgh on 2 October 1919 aged 80, one of the oldest generals whose death is registered by the Commonwealth War Graves Commission and classed to have died as result of service in World War I. He is buried with his son George Munro Sym (1883–1898) in the first northern extension of Dean Cemetery in western Edinburgh.

== Family ==
He was married Eliza D'Oyley Vincent (1848-1927).
