= Self-Help (Smiles book) =

1859 book by Samuel Smiles

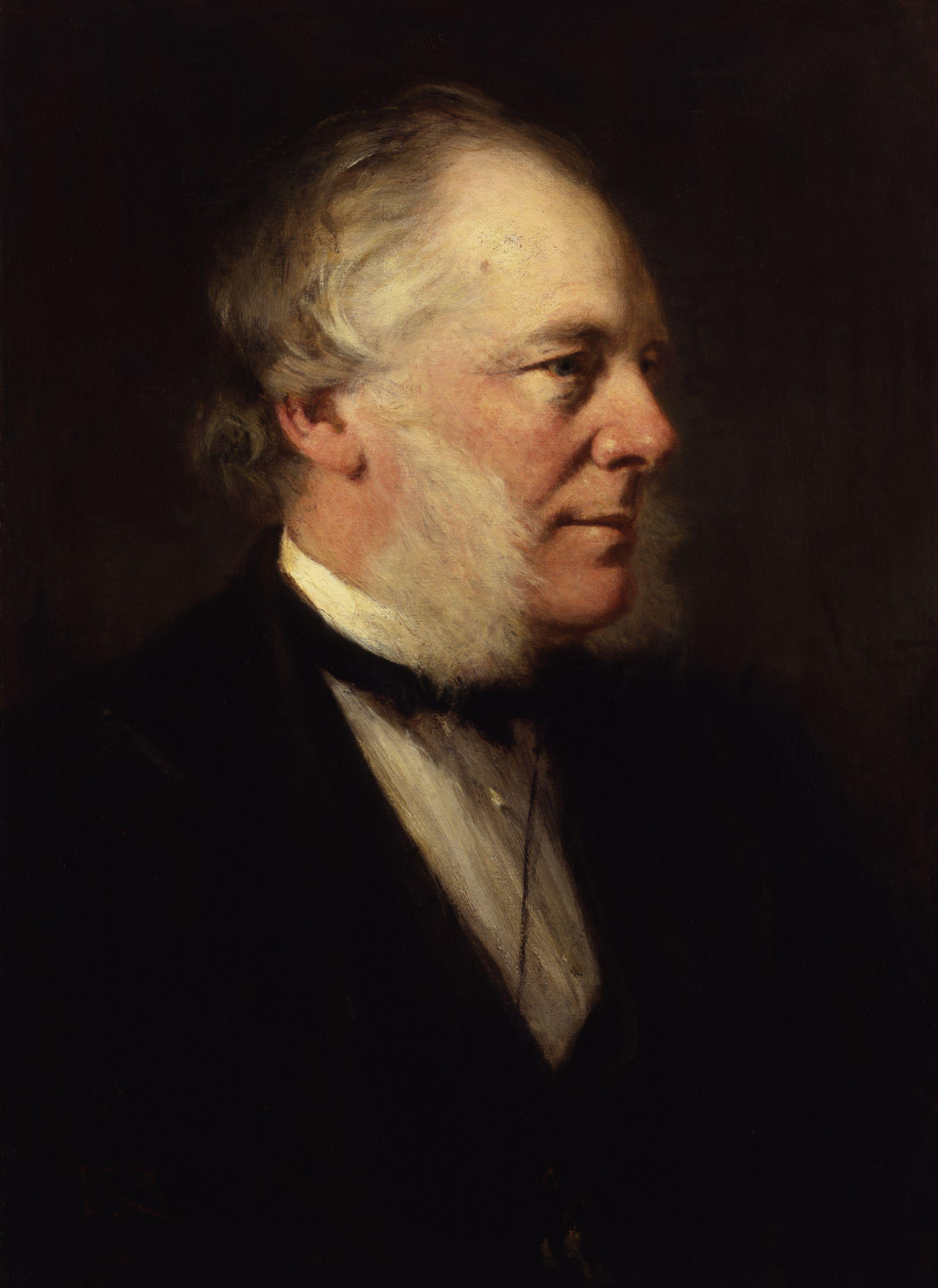
- Samuel Smiles by Sir George Reid
- Author: Samuel Smiles
- Language: English
- Publisher: John Murray
- Publication date: 1859
- Publication place: United Kingdom
- Preceded by: The Life of George Stephenson
- Followed by: Brief Biographies
- Text: Self-Help at Wikisource

Self-Help; With Illustrations of Character and Conduct is a book published in 1859 by Samuel Smiles. The second edition of 1866 added Perseverance to the subtitle. It has been called "the bible of mid-Victorian liberalism". Darwin biographer Janet Browne called it "the bible of the improving middle classes," and said that it "highlighted the belief in entrepreneurial improvement sweeping into every arena of mid-century existence".

== Contents ==
Smiles was not very successful in his careers as a doctor and journalist. He joined several cooperative ventures, but they failed for lack of capital. Disillusioned, he turned away from middle-class utopianism, and finally found intellectual refuge and national fame in the isolation of self-help. He extolled the virtues of self-help, industry, and perseverance. However, he rejected the application of laissez-faire to critical areas such as public health and education. According to historian Asa Briggs:

Self-help was one of the favorite mid-Victorian virtues. Relying on yourself was preferred morally—and economically—to depending on others. It was an expression of character even when it did not endure [...] The progressive development of society ultimately depended, it was argued, not on collective action or on parliamentary legislation but on the prevalence of practices of self-help.

Smiles built his argument using three concepts from the 18th-century Enlightenment. The concept of environmental determinism gave rise to the "passive" component in his thought. That allowed him to argue for the removal, by government intervention, of major hindrances that prevented the full development of the individual. A second theme was that a person's intellectual faculty matured last. That led him to emphasize the "active" role, stressing self-education and self-help. Finally he assumed there existed a beneficent natural order.

=== Contents of the second edition ===
1. Preface
2. Introduction to the First Edition
3. Descriptive Contents
1. Self-Help—National and Individual
2. Leaders of Industry—Inventors and Producers
3. Three Great Potters—Palissy, Böttgher, Wedgwood
4. Application and Perseverance
5. Helps and Opportunities—Scientific Pursuit
6. Workers in Art
7. Industry and the Peerage
8. Energy and Courage
9. Men of Business
10. Money—Its Use and Abuse
11. Self-Culture—Facilities and Difficulties
12. Example—Models
13. Character—the True Gentleman

== Reception ==
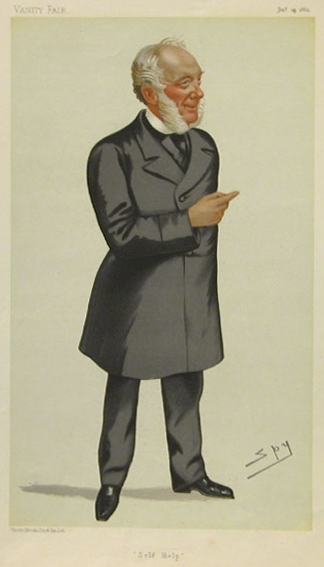
Samuel Smiles by "Spy" in Vanity Fair 1882.

Self-Help sold 20,000 copies within one year of its publication. By the time of Smiles' death in 1904 it had sold over a quarter of a million. Self-Help "elevated [Smiles] to celebrity status: almost overnight, he became a leading pundit and much-consulted guru". The book was translated and published in Dutch, French, Danish, German, Italian, Russian, Japanese, Arabic, Turkish, and in several Indian languages. In the preface to his 1880 book, Duty, Smiles wrote of Self-Help, "In America, the book has been more widely published and read than in Great Britain".

The three didactic self-help juvenile novels published by English author G. A. Henty in the 1880s show Smiles' influence. Each was an exposition of the philosophy of self-help as expressed by Smiles.

When an English visitor to the Khedive's palace in Egypt asked where the mottoes on the palace's walls originated, he was given the reply: "They are principally from Smeelis, you ought to know Smeelis! They are from his Self-Help."

The socialist Robert Tressell, in his novel The Ragged Trousered Philanthropists, said Self-Help was a book "suitable for perusal by persons suffering from almost complete obliteration of the mental faculties".

The founder of Toyota, Sakichi Toyoda was significantly influenced by his reading of Self-Help. A copy of Self-Help is under a glass display at the museum that exists on Sakichi Toyoda's birth site.

Robert Blatchford, a socialist activist, said it was "one of the most delightful and invigorating books it has been my happy fortune to meet with" and argued it should be taught in schools. However he also noted that socialists would not feel comfortable with Smiles' individualism but also noted that Smiles denounced "the worship of power, wealth, success, and keeping up appearances". A labour leader advised Blatchford to stay away from it: "It's a brutal book; it ought to be burnt by the common hangman. Smiles was the arch-Philistine, and his book the apotheosis of respectability, gigmanity, and selfish grab". However Jonathan Rose has argued that most pre-1914 labour leaders who commented on Self-Help praised it and it was not until after the First World War that criticisms of Smiles in worker's memoirs appeared. The Labour Party MPs William Johnson and Thomas Summerbell admired Smiles' work and the Communist miners leader A. J. Cook "started out with Self-Help".

Alexander Tyrrell argues that the Victorian middle class held several competing value systems, and that Smiles’s was only one of them.
