= Edwardes baronets =

Extinct baronetcy in the Baronetage of England

- Escutcheon of the Edwardes baronets of Shrewsbury
- Creation date: 1645 and 1678
- Status: extinct
- Extinction date: 1900
- Seats: Wootton Hall, Ashbourne, Derbyshire
- Motto: A vyno Duw dervid, What God has willed will be accomplished

The Edwardes Baronetcy, of Shrewsbury in the County of Shropshire, was a title in the Baronetage of England. It was created on 21 March 1645 for Thomas Edwardes. It was recreated on 22 April 1678 for his son and successor Francis Edwardes, with special remainders and precedence back to 1645, possibly due to the loss of the original patent. Sir Francis, the 2nd Baronet was Member of Parliament for Shrewsbury 1685–90. In 1734 the 3rd Baronet was succeeded by his cousin Henry (grandson of Thomas Edwardes, a younger son of the first Baronet) who married Eleanor Edwardes daughter of the 3rd Baronet. In 1790 the 6th Baronet was succeeded by Reverend Thomas Edwardes, Rector of Frodesley, Shropshire, great-grandson of the 1st Baronet by his 5th son. The 7th Baronet was also Rector of Frodesley. The titles became extinct on the death of the 10th Baronet in 1900.

== Edwardes baronets, of Shrewsbury (1645/1678) ==
- Sir Thomas Edwardes, 1st Baronet (1599–1660)
- Sir Francis Edwardes, 2nd Baronet (1643–1690)
- Sir Francis Edwardes, 3rd Baronet (died 1701)
- Sir Francis Edwardes, 4th Baronet (1699–1734)
- Sir Henry Edwardes, 5th Baronet (died 1767)
- Sir Thomas Edwardes, 6th Baronet (1730–1790)
- Sir Thomas Edwardes, 7th Baronet (1727–1797)
- Sir John Thomas Cholmondeley Edwardes, 8th Baronet (1764–1816)
- Sir Henry Edwardes, 9th Baronet (1787–1841)
- Sir Henry Hope Edwardes, 10th Baronet (1829–1900)

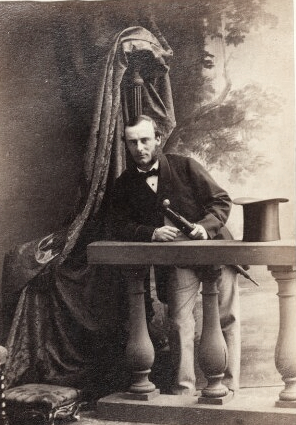
Sir Henry Hope Edwardes, 10th Baronet, 1860 photograph
