= John Edwards (disambiguation) =

John Edwards (born 1953) is an American politician who was the Democratic Party's vice-presidential nominee in the 2004 U.S. presidential election and a candidate for the 2004 and 2008 Democratic presidential nomination.

John Edwards may also refer to:

== Entertainment ==
- John Edwards (1699–1776), Welsh poet
- John Edwards (1747–1792), Welsh poet
- John Edwards (1751–1832), Irish poet
- John Edwards (painter) (1742–1815), English painter, designer, illustrator and botanist
- John Kelt Edwards (1875–1934), Welsh artist and cartoonist
- John Paul Edwards (1884–1968), American photographer
- John Uzzell Edwards (1934–2014), Welsh painter
- John Edwards (singer) (1944–2025), American R&B singer for the Spinners
- John Edwards (musician) (born 1953), English bass guitarist for Status Quo
- John Edwards (producer) (born 1953), Australian television drama producer
- Johnny Edwards (musician), American singer for the band Foreigner

== Politics ==
=== United States ===
- John Edwards (Kentucky politician) (1748–1837), Anti-Administration party
- John Edwards (Charleston politician) (1760–1798), mayor of Charleston, South Carolina
- John Edwards Caldwell (1769–1819), consular agent for the West Indies and San Domingo
- John Stark Edwards (1777–1813), Ohio's 6th congressional district
- John Edwards (New York politician) (1781–1850), 15th congressional district, 1837–1839
- John Edwards (Pennsylvania politician) (1786–1843), 4th congressional district Anti-Mason (1839–1841) and Whig (1841–1843)
- John C. Edwards (1804–1888), Democrat from Missouri; Congress at-large (1841–1843); governor (1844–1848)
- John Edwards (Arkansas politician) (1815–1894), 3rd congressional district (March 1871 – February 1872)
- John Edwards (Wisconsin politician) (1831–1891), Wisconsin State Assembly
- John H. Edwards (banker) (1875–1955), Assistant Secretary of the Treasury
- John S. Edwards (Virginia politician) (born 1943), in the Senate of Virginia
- John Edwards (Rhode Island politician) (born 1958), state legislator in Rhode Island
- John Bel Edwards (born 1966), Governor of Louisiana
- John Charles Edwards, Arkansas House of Representatives

=== United Kingdom ===
- John Edwards (MP for Bridgwater) (fl. 1562–1573), MP for Bridgwater
- John Edwards (MP for Denbighshire) (c. 1562–1625)
- John Edwards (MP for Flint Boroughs) (died 1635), MP for Flint Boroughs
- Sir John Edwards, 1st Baronet, of Garth (1770–1850), British MP for Montgomery (1833–1841)
- John Edwards-Vaughan (1772–1833), British MP for Glamorganshire and Wells
- John Passmore Edwards (1823–1911), British Liberal MP for Salisbury, elected in 1880; also newspaperman and philanthropist
- J. Hugh Edwards (1869–1945), British Liberal MP for Mid Glamorgan (1910–1918); Neath (1918–1922); Accrington (1923–1929)
- John Edwards (Welsh politician) (1882–1960), British Liberal MP for Aberavon (1918–1922)
- John Edwards (Labour politician) (1904–1959), British MP for Blackburn (1945–1950); Brighouse and Spenborough (1950–1959)

=== Elsewhere ===
- John Edwards (Australian politician) (1820–1872), member of the Queensland Legislative Assembly
- John Wesley Edwards (1865–1929), Conservative politician from Ontario; House of Commons (1908–1921 and 1925–1929)
- John Edwards (regulator), New Zealand-born Information Commissioner for the United Kingdom

== Religion ==
- John Edwards (divine) (1637–1716), English Calvinistic divine
- John Edwards (minister) (1714–1785), English dissenting minister at Leeds, Yorkshire
- John Edwards (Unitarian minister) (1768–1808), English nonconformist and political radical
- John Edwards (missionary) (1828–1903), American protestant minister to the Choctaw Nation, best known for work at Wheelock Mission in present-day Oklahoma
- John Edwards (hymnist) (1805–1885), Welsh Anglican priest and hymn composer
- John Edwards (archdeacon of St Asaph) (1889–1976), Welsh Anglican priest

== Sports ==
- John Hawley Edwards (1850–1893), footballer in England and Wales; a founder of Welsh Football Association
- Jack Edwards (cricketer, born 1860) (John Dunlop Edwards, 1860–1911), Australian cricketer
- John Edwards (footballer, born 1875) (1875–?), English footballer
- John Edwards (Canadian football) (1912–2005)
- John Edwards (cricketer, born 1928) (1928–2002), Australian cricketer
- John Edwards (Barbadian cricketer) (1909–1976)
- John Edwards (Australian footballer) (born 1942), Australian rules footballer
- John Edwards (canoeist) (born 1954), Canadian sprint canoer
- John Edwards (basketball) (born 1981), American basketball player
- John Edwards (racing driver) (born 1991), American racing driver
- Johnny Edwards (baseball) (born 1938), American MLB National League catcher

== Other ==
- John Edwards (academic) (1600–1660?), professor of Natural Philosophy at Oxford University 1638–1648
- John Edwards (Siôn Treredyn) (1605/6–1656), Welsh translator who used the pen name "Siôn Treredyn"
- John Edwards (American Civil War sailor) (1831–1902), member of U.S. Navy who was awarded Medal of Honor during the Civil War
- John Newman Edwards (1839–1889), American frontier writer and newspaperman
- John D. Edwards (1885–1918), American naval officer awarded the Navy Cross
- John Bryn Edwards (1889–1922), Welsh ironmaster and philanthropist
- John Ellis Edwards (1922–1979), Tuskegee airman
- John Menlove Edwards (1910–1958), English child psychologist and poet
- John H. Edwards (1928–2007), British medical geneticist
- John Robert Edwards (born 1947), professor of psychology and language in Nova Scotia
- John A. Edwards (born 1960), Irish judge
- John M. Edwards, professor of surgery
- John Edwards (British Army officer) (1896–1984)
- John R. Edwards (US Marshal) (born 1942), American law enforcement officer from Vermont
- John R. Edwards (general), United States Air Force general
- John Edwards (1846–1937), Scottish lawyer, palaeographer and collector; see Edwards Professor of Medieval History
- John Timothy Edwards (1975–1994), Florida State University student murdered in 1994; see Murder of John Edwards

== See also ==
- Jack Edwards (disambiguation)
- Jackie Edwards (disambiguation)
- John Edwards Holbrook (1796–1871), American zoologist, naturalist and physician
- John Edward (disambiguation)
- Jonathan Edwards (disambiguation)
- John & Edward, X Factor finalists
- Edwards (surname)
