= John R. Edwards =

John R. Edwards may refer to:

- John Edwards (Johnny Reid Edwards), American politician, candidate for the 2008 Democratic presidential nomination
- John R. Edwards (US Marshal), American law enforcement officer from Vermont
- John R. Edwards (general), United States Air Force general
- John Robert Edwards (born 1947), professor of psychology and language in Nova Scotia

== See also ==
- John Edwards (disambiguation)
