= Johnny Edwards =

Johnny Edwards is the name of:

- Johnny Edwards (baseball) (born 1938), American MLB National League catcher
- John Edwards (born 1953), American politician from North Carolina
- Johnny Edwards (footballer) (1912–1973), Australian footballer
- Johnny Edwards (musician), American singer and guitarist

== See also ==
- John Edwards (disambiguation)
- Jack Edwards (disambiguation)
- Edwards (surname)
