= Rodney Lewis =

Rodney or Rod Lewis may refer to:

- Rodney Lewis (businessman) (born 1954), founder, president, and chief executive officer of Lewis Energy
- Rodney D. Lewis, United States Air Force general
- Rodney Lewis (American football) (born 1959), American football defensive back
- Rod Lewis (footballer) (born 1960), Australian rules footballer
- Roderick Lewis (born 1971), known as Rod, American football tight end
