= Journal of Multilingual and Multicultural Development =

- Discipline: Applied Linguistics, Sociolinguistics
- Language: English
- Edited by: John Robert Edwards

Publication details
- History: 1980–present
- Publisher: Routledge
- Frequency: 7/year
- Open access: Hybrid open access
- Impact factor: 0.943 (2016)

Standard abbreviations
- ISO 4: J. Multiling. Multicult. Dev.

Indexing
- ISSN: 0143-4632 (print); 1747-7557 (web)
- LCCN: 81643161
- OCLC no.: 848205886

Links
- Journal homepage; Online access; Online archive

The Journal of Multilingual and Multicultural Development is a peer-reviewed academic journal covering the study of topics in the sociology and social psychology of language, in language and cultural politics, policy, planning, and practice. The editor-in-chief is John Robert Edwards. It was established in 1980 and is published in 7 issues per year by Routledge.

== Abstracting and indexing ==
The journal is abstracted and indexed in Linguistics and Language Behavior Abstracts, MLA International Bibliography, and Social Sciences Citation Index. According to the Journal Citation Reports, the journal has a 2016 impact factor of 0.943, ranking it 67th of 182 journals in the Linguistics category.
