= John S. Edwards =

John S. Edwards may refer to:

- John Stark Edwards (1777–1813), born in Connecticut; elected to U.S. Congress from Ohio's 6th district
- John S. Edwards (Virginia) (born 1943), Democrat from Roanoke; has represented 21st District in Virginia General Assembly since 1997

== See also ==
- John Edwards (disambiguation)
- Edwards (surname)
