= James R. Sears =

U.S. Air Force general

James R. Sears Jr.
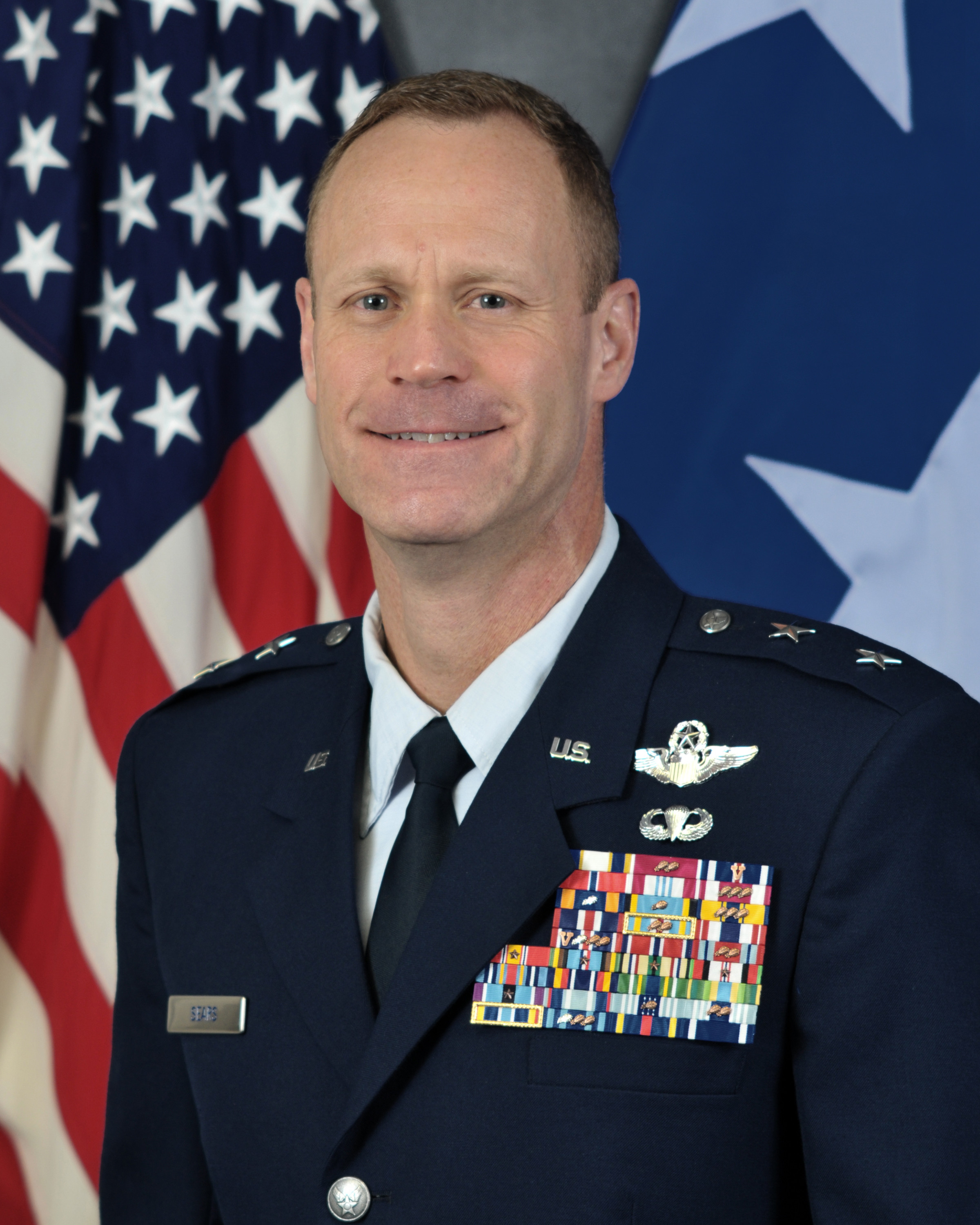
- Born: Gallatin, Missouri, U.S.
- Military career
- Allegiance: United States
- Branch: United States Air Force
- Service years: 1991–2024
- Rank: Major General
- Commands: Air Force Operational Test and Evaluation Center; 455th Air Expeditionary Wing; 14th Flying Training Wing; 20th Operations Group; 61st Fighter Squadron
- Awards: Distinguished Service Medal; Legion of Merit (3)

James R. Sears Jr. is a retired United States Air Force major general who served as the deputy commander of Air Education and Training Command from 2022 to 2024. He served as the Commander of the Air Force Operational Test and Evaluation Center. Previously, he was the Director of Plans, Programs, and Requirements of the Air Education and Training Command.

Military offices
Preceded by David Julazadeh	Commander of the 455th Air Expeditionary Wing; 2016–2017	Succeeded by Craig Baker
Preceded by John Cherrey	Director of Intelligence, Operations, and Nuclear Integration of the Air Education and Training Command; 2017–2018	Succeeded by William A. Spangenthal
Preceded by William A. Spangenthal	Director of Plans, Programs, and Requirements of the Air Education and Training Command; 2018–2020	Succeeded by Laura Lenderman
Preceded by Michael T. Brewer	Commander of the Air Force Operational Test and Evaluation Center; 2020–2022	Succeeded by Michael T. Rawls
Preceded by Andrea Tullos	Deputy Commander of the Air Education and Training Command; 2022–2024	Succeeded by Clark Quinn
