= Jackie Edwards =

Jackie Edwards may refer to:

- Jackie Edwards (musician) (1938–1992), Jamaican musician and songwriter
- Jackie Edwards (rugby league) (1939–2025), English rugby league player
- Jackie Edwards (long jumper) (born 1971), Bahamian long jumper

== See also ==
- Jack Edwards (disambiguation)
- John Edwards (disambiguation)
