= Craig Baker =

U.S. Air Force general

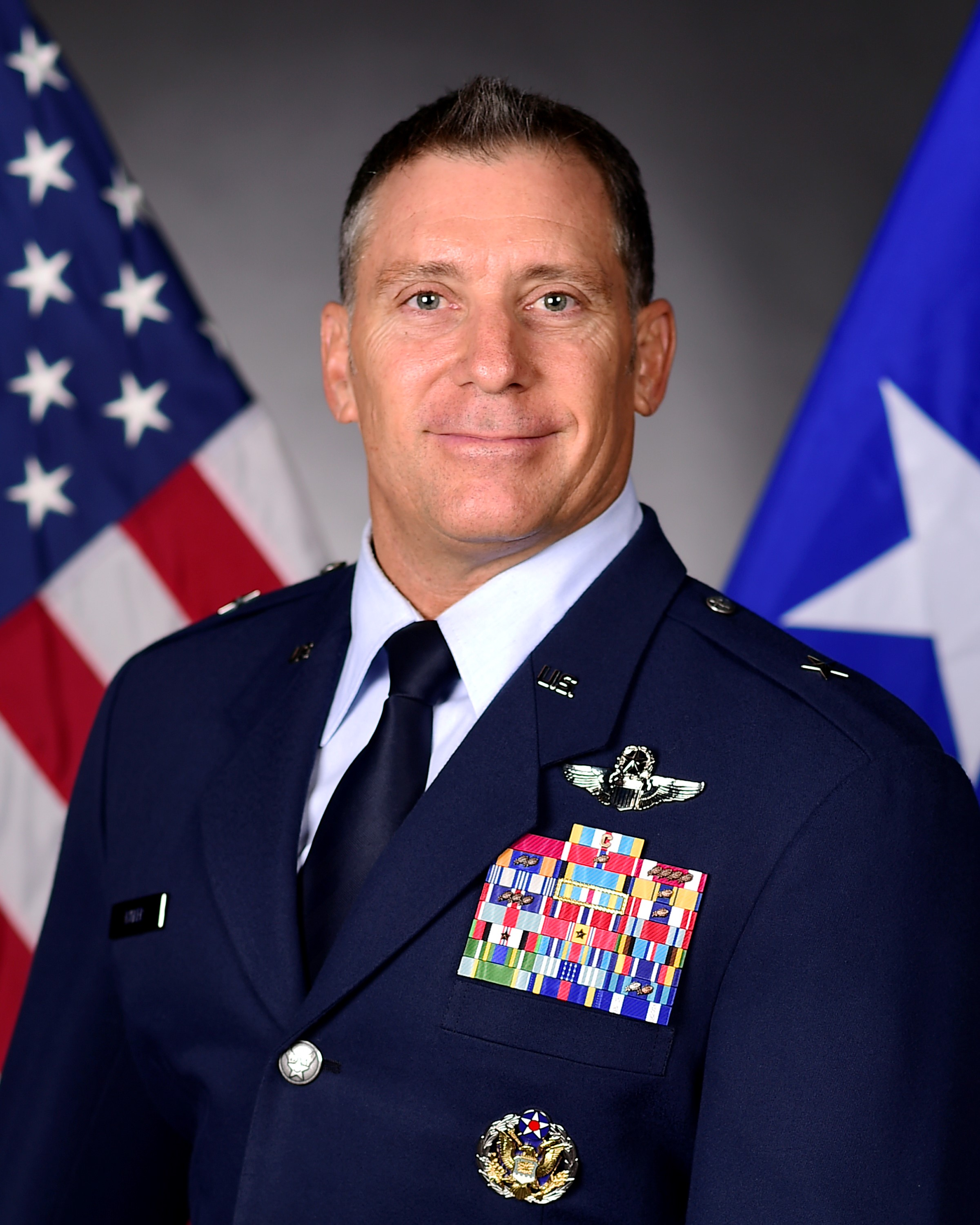
- Official portrait, 2018
- Military career
- Allegiance: United States
- Branch: United States Air Force
- Service years: 1992–present
- Rank: Brigadier general
- Commands: 455th Air Expeditionary Wing; 180th Fighter Wing; 8th Fighter Squadron
- Awards: Defense Superior Service Medal; Legion of Merit

Craig R. Baker is a retired United States Air Force brigadier general who last served as the vice commander of the Twelfth Air Force. Prior to that, he was the commander of the 455th Air Expeditionary Wing.

Military offices
Preceded by Steven Nordhaus	Commander of the 180th Fighter Wing; 2014–2016	Succeeded by William D. Betts
Preceded by James R. Sears	Commander of the 455th Air Expeditionary Wing; 2017–2018	Succeeded by David B. Lyons
Preceded by David B. Lyons	Vice Commander of the Twelfth Air Force; 2018–2021	Succeeded by Sean Choquette
