= Air Force Operational Test and Evaluation Center =

Direct reporting unit of the United States Air Force responsible for test and evaluation

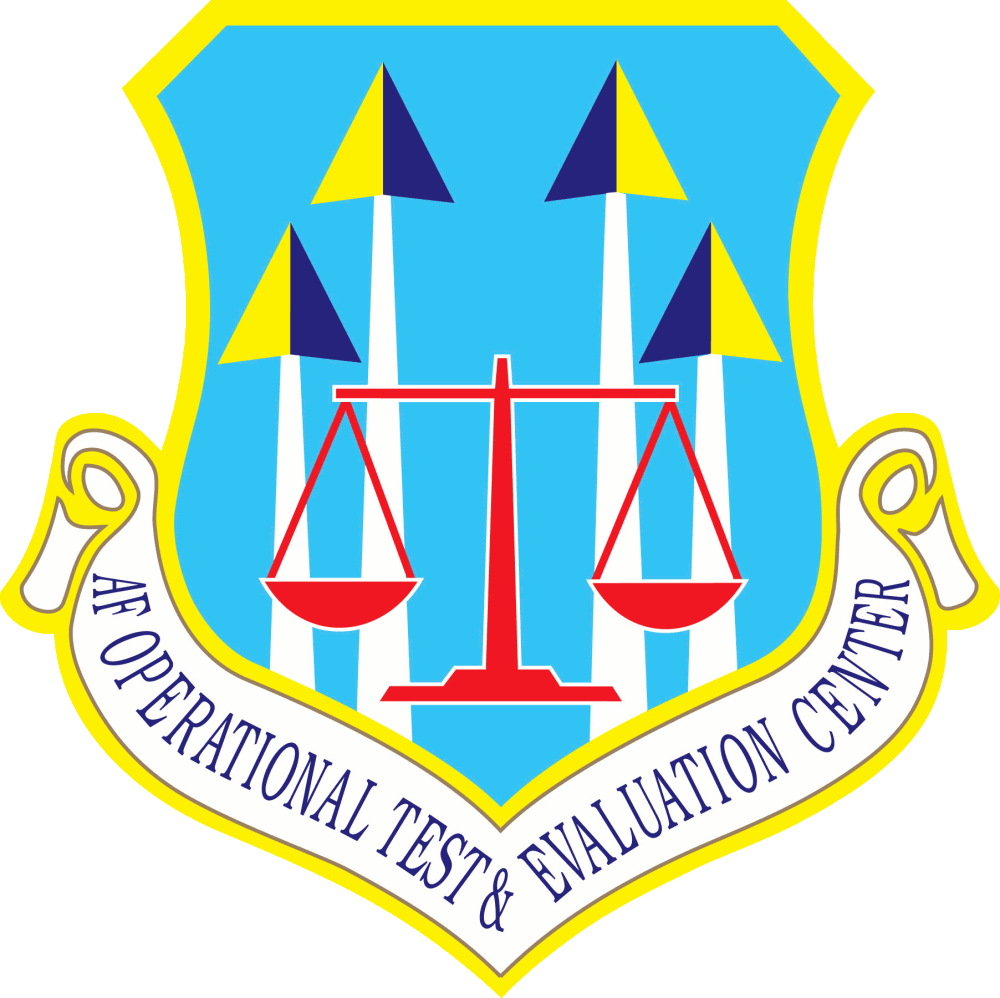
- Shield of the Air Force Operational Test and Evaluation Center
- Active: 4 April 1983 – present (as Air Force Operational Test and Evaluation Center); 1 January 1974 – 4 April 1983 (as Air Force Test and Evaluation Center) (52 years, 8 months)
- Country: United States
- Branch: United States Air Force
- Type: Direct Reporting Unit
- Garrison/HQ: Kirtland Air Force Base, New Mexico, U.S.
- Decorations: Air Force Organization Excellence Award
- Website: www.afotec.af.mil

Commanders
- Commander: Brig Gen Jesse J. Friedel
- Vice Commander: Col Alicia D. Abrams

Located at Kirtland Air Force Base, New Mexico, the Air Force Operational Test and Evaluation Center is a direct reporting unit of Headquarters, United States Air Force. It is the Air Force independent test agency responsible for testing, under operationally realistic conditions, new systems being developed for Air Force and multi-service use.

AFOTEC employs more than 600 military and civilian personnel at its headquarters and four detachments located at Kirtland AFB (NM), Eglin AFB, (FL), Hill AFB (UT), Edwards AFB (CA), and Nellis AFB (NV) respectfully, as well as multiple operating locations around the country. In 2021, the former detachment at Peterson AFB (CO) was transferred to the United States Space Force.

Test teams conduct tests at selected sites; collect, analyze and evaluate the data; and prepare formal reports. The teams are managed by AFOTEC and include personnel from the operating and supporting commands who will eventually employ these systems.

AFOTEC's independent and objective evaluations of how well systems will meet operational requirements provide a vital link between the developer and user. They are key elements of the system acquisition approval process.

Operational tests are designed to address critical issues regarding a system's performance in combat-like environments when operated by field personnel. They seek to answer questions about how safe, effective, reliable, maintainable, compatible, and logistically supportable new Air Force systems will be.

The results of AFOTEC's tests, normally conducted on prototype and pre-production models, play an important role in Air Force and DOD acquisition decisions. Test results also identify deficiencies requiring corrective action.

== History ==
In addition to the study of fielded weapons used in Vietnam, a new Department of Defense leadership team began major reforms when the new Richard M. Nixon administration began in 1969. Deputy Secretary of Defense David Packard, the esteemed entrepreneur who favored the "fly-before-buy" approach, and Undersecretary of the Air Force John L. McLucas, who dealt with operational problems with the F-111 and C-5 transport, took the lead in defining a new emphasis on OT&E.

Several government committees, commissions, and agencies studied how to implement acquisition reform, including the benefits of independent operational test and evaluation. Participants in all of these studies, along with an increasing number of Senators and Congressmen, concluded that the developing and using commands had become less impartial about the capabilities of, and need for, their major acquisition programs.

In July 1970, a Presidential Blue Ribbon Defense Panel recommended the creation of an OT&E organization in each service, independent from the developer and user, and reporting directly to the chief of each service. Deputy Secretary Packard quickly started to implement the Panel's recommendations. By November 1971, Congress showed its support for OT&E by requiring that the services submit OT&E results before procuring new systems.

Congress expected the independent operational test agency in each service to test and evaluate a system relative to two questions: Is the system operationally effective? and Is the system operationally suitable?. Operational effectiveness addresses how well a system performed the mission for which it was designed. Operational suitability, on the other hand, examined if a system could be maintained, kept available, and was reliable in the operational environment.

Some members of the Air Staff, unfavorably recalling the contributions of the Air Proving Ground Command, attempted to find alternatives to creating a new, independent OT&E organization. They contended that internal changes were the first step. Air Force leadership also adopted a new dichotomy in which developing commands would typically conduct developmental test and evaluation while the using commands would usually conduct operational test and evaluation. Senior Air Force leadership believed these changes could bring to the Air Force the balance and independence Congress and the Department of Defense favored for each service.

In 1973, John L. McLucas became Secretary of the Air Force, and General George S. Brown became the new Chief of Staff of the Air Force. In September 1973, General Brown ordered the Air Staff to plan for a new independent OT&E agency. On 11 December 1973, a directive from Headquarters Air Force established the Air Force Test and Evaluation Center at Kirtland Air Force Base, New Mexico, effective 1 January 1974. The Center achieved initial operational capability in April 1974 and full operational capability by October 1974.

=== AFTEC's Early Years ===
AFTEC's charter largely addressed the criticisms of OT&E and the Blue Panel's recommendations. For example, as a Separate Operating Agency, the Center reported directly to the Chief of Staff of the Air Force as a means of ensuring independence from the developing and using commands. AFTEC test teams would consist of specialists who would operate and maintain the systems after deployment. The Center would provide the results of its evaluations to the Secretary of the Air Force and the Chief of Staff in support of key decision points in the acquisition process. And, AFTEC would conduct impartial tests under conditions as close to those encountered in the field.

At the same time, the Air Force also took steps to avoid creating another APGC. AFTEC would be a small management headquarters with approximately 200 personnel, and AFTEC would never own any of the systems it tested. The charter and subsequent events showed the Air Force's reluctance to turn all OT&E over to the new Center. Although AFTEC declared full operational capability in October 1974, by the end of its first year, the Center had responsibility to test only 32 OT&E programs, while the major commands continued to conduct OT&E on their programs of interest. AFTEC was limited to monitoring OT&E of smaller acquisition programs at the major commands. Another obstacle arose because AFTEC was such a small organization that it had to rely heavily on the major commands to provide personnel for test teams and funds for OT&E.

In October 1976, Major General Howard W. Leaf assumed command of AFTEC, and gradually implemented changes that enhanced AFTEC's role in OT&E conducted at the major commands. Major General Leaf, promoted to Lieutenant General and reassigned as inspector general of the Air Force, departed AFTEC in May 1980. By that time, he had helped find solutions to AFTEC's budgeting process, forged closer relationships with the major commands, and had established three levels of AFTEC effort for monitoring major command OT&E programs. Like his predecessors and successors as AFTEC commander, Major General Leaf sought to involve OT&E testers as early as possible in programs identified for OT&E to help ensure system readiness for test and that tests reflected the needs of users of the new systems. Early OT&E also played a role in ensuring the "fix-before-buy" approach had a chance to save resources by finding problems before production, thereby avoiding costly modifications to fielded systems. As a whole, Major General Leaf's time as AFTEC commander stabilized the new organization and made it a more active participant in Air Force OT&E.

From AFTEC to Air Force Operational Test and Evaluation Center

AFTEC's increasing contributions to Air Force OT&E led the Center to create detachments and operating locations dedicated to conducting AFTEC's OT&E mission. While AFTEC headquarters remained at Kirtland AFB, detachments activated at numerous locations, including Kapaun, Germany, Eglin AFB, Florida, Edwards AFB, California, and Nellis AFB, Nevada. Detachments tended to support relatively broad categories of test—fighter aircraft, large aircraft, and munitions, for example. Operating locations, smaller than the detachments and located throughout the United States, tended to focus on individual systems.

On 4 April 1983, the Center was redesignated the Air Force Operational Test and Evaluation Center. This title more accurately described its unique mission of evaluating the operational effectiveness and operational suitability of new systems. It also clearly delineated its role as the Air Force's operational test agency.

Congress, with an increased interest in understanding the operational effectiveness and operational suitability of major Department of Defense acquisition programs, directed the creation of a new position, Director, Operational Test and Evaluation, in the Office of the Secretary of Defense in September 1983. Congress required that the Director, Directorate of Operational Test and Evaluation (DOT&E) would report directly, without intervening review or approval, to the Secretary of Defense and to Congress. One of the requirements Congress levied on DOT&E was to create, maintain, and update a list of major Department of Defense acquisition programs, and to prepare an annual report to Congress, informing that body about the progress of programs with high interest and visibility in Congress.

=== End of the Cold War Brings More Change ===
Unrest in Europe in 1989 brought the fall of the Berlin Wall in November of that year, and ultimately the demise of the Soviet Union and the end of the Cold War. The United States began to dramatically reduce the size of its armed services shortly thereafter. Chief of Staff of the Air Force General Merrill A. McPeak announced the consolidation of several Air Force major commands and personnel reductions as part of the overall Department of Defense reductions.

As part of these reductions and reorganization, the Air Force changed its Direct Reporting Units (DRUs) and Separate Operating Agencies (SOAs) to field operating agencies and assigned them to appropriate functional chiefs at Headquarters U.S. Air Force. Because of AFOTEC's charter as an independent test agency that reported directly to the Chief of Staff of the Air Force, the Center became one of only three Direct Reporting Units in the Air Force on 5 February 1991.

Several proposals to consolidate Air Force OT&E at AFOTEC also circulated during broad area reviews associated with reorganizing the Air Force. The U.S. Air Force Scientific Advisory Board, for example, addressed the feasibility of expanding AFOTEC's role and scope of responsibility for the entire test and evaluation process, from the initial statement of need to the last major upgrade of a system. A Department of Defense Inspector General report used a different perspective and criticized the Air Force for not having a single operational test agency.

In September 1991, Secretary of the Air Force Dr. Donald B. Rice and General McPeak created a new office in the Air Staff, the Director of Test and Evaluation. Retired Lieutenant General Howard W. Leaf became the first Director of Test and Evaluation in October 1991, and two months later, proposed consolidating OT&E at AFOTEC. As part of the Air Force reorganization and drawdown, General McPeak directed that the Center not only continue its lead role in multi-service OT&E, but also the consolidation of all initial and qualification OT&E and select follow-on OT&E at AFOTEC by 1 June 1992. By design, this meant General McPeak limited the type and scope of testing the major commands could perform in the future. Overnight, the number of AFOTEC-conducted tests rose first from 47 to 186, and ultimately to more than 200. General McPeak also announced that AFOTEC would receive additional personnel to ensure it could meet its newly expanded mission.

The Center's mission grew again on 1 October 1997 when AFOTEC absorbed the personnel and workload of the Defense Evaluation Support Activity (DESA). DESA, which had experience with rapid test, was heavily involved in testing advanced concept technology demonstrations, which sought out innovative applications for emerging technologies to create prototype systems for examination by operational units.

While "fly-before-buy" has repeatedly proven its worth in thorough testing of systems and avoidance of later problems, the Air Force even in the twenty-first century remains severely hampered by a "buy-fly-fix" approach. Literally billions of dollars have been spent in making weapons systems operational after they have entered squadron service. For example, the Rockwell B-1B Lancer suffered repeated such problems. When declared operational, apart from nuclear weapons, the only conventional weapon the B-1 could use were free-fall bombs.

=== Twenty-first century ===
In 2020-2021, with the creation of the United States Space Force and its provisional STAR Delta, AFOTEC's Detachment 4 at Peterson Air Force Base, Colorado, was transferred to the USSF. Detachment 4 had conducted operational testing and evaluation of space, cyberspace, information technology, missile, and missile defense systems. Some of the major systems tested by Detachment 4 included the Global Positioning System, Space Based Infrared System, Advanced Extremely High Frequency Satellite Communications, Space Based Space Surveillance, Cobra Judy Replacement, Defense Integrated Military human resources System, and the Integrated Strategic Planning and Analysis Network. In addition, Detachment 4 was part of the Ballistic Missile Defense System Operational Test Agency Combined Test Force, participating in the testing and exercise events that evaluate components and spirals of the overall Ballistic Missile Defense System.

== Today's AFOTEC ==
AFOTEC Headquarters at Kirtland AFB (NM), oversees four detachments, and multiple operating locations and liaison offices across the United States. AFOTEC continues to test and evaluate new weapon systems and capabilities in operationally realistic environments. AFOTEC offers fact-based, quality data in its test reports to inform decision makers on a range of assessments of effectiveness, suitability, and whether a system is fully, partly, or not mission capable. For more than three decades, AFOTEC has been the focal point for Air Force operational test and evaluation and has significantly contributed to the successful acquisition and operational employment of numerous weapon and support systems for all branches of the armed forces, other government agencies, and US allies.

Vision

Leading edge operational testers dedicated to advancing America's warfighting capabilities

Mission

Test and evaluate new capabilities in operationally realistic environments to inform warfighters and influence national resource decisions.

AFOTEC Priorities

1. Continuing to strengthen the nuclear enterprise.

2. Winning today's fights.

3. Developing and caring for Airmen and their families.

4. Modernization.

5. Recapturing acquisition excellence.

== Lineage and honors ==
The Air Force activated the Air Force Test and Evaluation Center as a separate operating agency reporting directly to the Chief of Staff of the Air Force on 1 January 1974 at Kirtland Air Force Base, N.M. The Air Force redesignated AFOTEC a Direct Reporting Unit to the CSAF 5 February 1991. Later in 1991, the Air Force broadened AFOTEC's responsibilities by reassigning all initial, qualification and selected follow-on operational tests and evaluations from the major commands to the Center.

=== Air Force Organizational Excellence Award ===
The Air Force Organizational Excellence Award recognizes the achievements and accomplishments of U.S. Air Force organizations or activities. It is awarded to Air Force internal organizations that are entities within larger organizations. They are unique, unnumbered organizations or activities that perform functions normally performed by numbered wings, groups, squadrons, etc. Then Secretary of the Air Force, Robert C. Seamans Jr., authorized this award on 26 August 1969.

This award is a ribbon with a narrow blue center stripe, flanked by a thin white stripe, a wide red stripe, a thin white stripe, edged with a narrow blue stripe. A bronze "V" device is worn on the ribbon to denote award for combat or direct combat support actions.

The Air Force Operational Test and Evaluation Center has received this award eleven times since 1983.

AFOTEC Air Force Organizational Excellence Awards

Special Order GB-481, 1 January 1983 – 31 December 1984

Special Order GB-539, 1 April 1985 – 31 March 1987

Special Order GB-173, 1 October 1987 – September 1989

Special Order GB-114, 1 October 1991 – 31 October 1993

Special Order GB-121, 1 November 1993 – 15 November 1995

Special Order GB-130, 1 January 1998 – 31 December 1999

Special Order G-221, 1 January 2000 – 31 December 2001

Special Order G-284, 1 January 2002 – 31 December 2003

Special Order G-188, 1 January 2005 – 31 December 2006

Special Order G-078, 1 January 2007 – 31 December 2008

Special Order G-062, 1 January 2009 – 31 December 2010

== Emblem ==
The Air Force Operational Test and Evaluation Center emblem was approved 25 September 1974 and was based upon the description of roles and missions of the Air Force at that time.

Emblem history

The emblem features four blue and gold "deltoids." Each of the deltoids has a symbolic meaning, representing four fundamental military objectives of the United States that include: to deter aggression; to resolve conflicts on favorable terms, to achieve national objectives, and to promote a secure international environment

Element Significance

The four blue and gold deltoids are symbolic of fundamental tasks of the Air Force acting as an instrument of national policy. The blue-gold deltoid color scheme divides the four fundamental tasks into eight equal segments which signify major operational tasks assigned to the Air Force:

1. strategic air warfare;
2. counter air;
3. air interdiction;
4. close air support;
5. aerospace defense;
6. air reconnaissance;
7. electronic warfare;
8. airlift.

The ultramarine blue segments represent the sky (near earth) which is the primary environment for Air Force operations. The golden yellow segments represent the sun (directionally depicted rising from the east and setting in the west as indicated by the deltoids) and the excellence required of Center personnel.

White contrails, which trail the deltoids, signify the test and evaluation process that follows concept formulation, validation, and full-scale development of systems and equipment.

The red scales portray AFOTEC's impartial and independent assessment of a system's value when weighed against the fundamental military tasks and Air Force roles and missions.

Heraldic Description: Light blue, issuing from base four contrails palewise argent terminating below four deltoids ascending, one in dexter flank, two in chief and one in sinister flank, the dexter two or and azure, and the sinister two of the like and or; surmounting the vapor trails a pair of scales gules, all within a diminished bordure gold.

== Assignments ==
Direct Reporting Unit to the Chief of Staff of the United States Air Force

== Components ==
=== Directorates ===
1. A1 – Manpower and Personnel. Mission: Provides manpower, military and civilian personnel, education, and training services to all AFOTEC assigned personnel in support of the AFOTEC mission. Performs command duties that encompass health, welfare, and morale areas while also responsible for disciplinary proceedings and associated administrative actions.
2. A2/A9 – Intelligence, Analysis and Assessments. Mission: Executive agent for ensuring technical adequacy. Provides program-by-program technical guidance, capabilities, and information needed to assist detachments in the scoping, planning, executing, and reporting of independent operational test and evaluation and other AFOTEC activities. Provides technical oversight and guidance/direction to detachment Technical Advisors.
3. A3 – Operations. Mission: The focal point for operational test and evaluation operations. Directs all operational test and evaluation planning, execution, and reporting activities. Ensures system employment and operational issues are properly and adequately represented when providing recommendations to the Commander on test scope and resource allocation. Ensures the scope of OT&E, as well as other operational evaluation efforts undertaken by the Center (e.g., innovation programs, exercises, and experiments), meet AFOTEC policy standards during test concept development, planning, execution, and reporting. Validates resource requirements.
4. A4/A7 – Installations and Mission Support. Mission: Centralizes management of support resources and common services used by AFOTEC in the support of the Air Force OT&E program. Identifies, programs, budgets, and manages funds required to support the AFOTEC mission. Acts as the focal point for the coordination and programming of all support resources. Provides services to AFOTEC headquarters, detachments, and test teams for financial management, facilities planning, logistics support, communications support, contracting/procurement, and data automation, information management, and equipment acquisition.
5. A5/A8 – Plans and Programs. Mission: Develops and manages the policy, programmatics, strategic planning, and test infrastructure expertise and solutions for AFOTEC. Conducts strategic planning to meet future challenges; programs and advocates fiscal resources to support Center test operations and range infrastructure; identifies test infrastructure shortfalls and advocates funding to develop solutions; formulates policy to guide OT&E Air Force warfighting and combat support systems. Interfaces with the Office of the Secretary of Defense, Director for Operational Test and Evaluation, HQ USAF, major commands, and DoD ranges to ensure OT&E requirements and fiscal requirements are met. Works with Combatant Commands and MAJCOMs to develop an integrated OT&E priority list.
6. A6 – Communications: Mission: Provides relevant support, expertise, and policy command-wide in knowledge management, information technology, assurance, operations, and management, enabling the successful accomplishment of the AFOTEC mission.

=== Detachments ===
==== Former Detachment 1 (AFOTEC DET. 1) ====
Edwards Air Force Base, California. AFOTEC DET 1 had operating locations at Fort Worth, Texas and Arlington, Virginia. Detachment 1 lead Block 2 and Block 3 Initial Operational Testing and Evaluation for the F-35 Lightning II. The Detachment 1 Commander served as the Joint Strike Fighter Operation Test Team Combined Test Director, leading team members from the U.S. Air Force, U.S. Navy, U.S. Marines, United Kingdom Air Warfare Centre, and Royal Netherlands Air Force in testing and evaluating F-35 operations, training and logistics.

==== Detachment 2 (AFOTEC DET. 2) ====
Eglin Air Force Base, Florida. AFOTEC Detachment 2 is located on one of the largest land-water ranges in the United States. The detachment tests new and advanced munitions, electronic warfare equipment, mission planning systems, combat support, and command and control systems. In 2007 the Small Diameter Bomb test team received the Air Force Association's Test and Evaluation Team of the Year award for outstanding achievement in test and evaluation of a defense acquisition program.

==== Detachment 5 (AFOTEC DET. 5) ====
Edwards Air Force Base, California. Detachment 5 is located in the Mojave Desert 100 miles north of Los Angeles. Strategically co-located with the Air Force Flight Test Center to take advantage of integrated developmental and operational test opportunities, Detachment 5 has an operating location at Hurlburt Field, Florida. Detachment 5 performs operational test and evaluation of mobility, bomber, and command and control, intelligence, surveillance and reconnaissance weapon systems. Detachment 5's major test programs have included the C-5M Super Galaxy, MQ-9 Reaper and RQ-4 Global Hawk sensor systems, C-130 enhancements, and system upgrades to the B-1, B-2 and B-52 bomber fleet. Detachment 5 has also managed operational test of the Common Vertical Lift Support Platform, the C-27J Joint Cargo Aircraft, the E-3 Sentry Airborne Warning and Control System, and the KC-46A.

==== Detachment 6 (AFOTEC DET. 6) ====
Nellis Air Force Base, Nevada. Located near the Nellis Test and Training Range in Las Vegas, Nevada, Detachment 6 conducts operational test and evaluation of all fielded Air Force fighter aircraft. Detachment 6 also conducts live air-to-air and air-to-ground weapons testing at the Utah Test and Training Range and mission level testing at the Nevada Test and Training Range.

== Stations ==
Operating locations and Liaison Offices (not current)

1. Arlington, Virginia
2. Buckley Space Force Base, Colorado
3. Hurlburt Field, Florida
4. Los Angeles Air Force Base, California
5. Marietta, Georgia
6. Seattle, Washington
7. Vandenberg Space Force Base, California

== List of commanders ==
No.	Portrait	Name	Start	End
1		Lieutenant General; John J. Burns	25 February 1974	25 August 1974
2		Major General; Richard G. Cross Jr.	26 August 1974	31 August 1975
-		Colonel; Stephen E. Moore; Acting	1 September 1975	9 November 1975
3		Major General; Robert A. Rushworth	9 November 1975	30 September 1976
4		Lieutenant General; Howard W. Leaf	1 October 1976	31 May 1980
5		Major General; Wayne E. Whitlatch	1 June 1980	27 May 1982
6		Richard W. Phillips Jr.	28 May 1982	29 August 1985
7		Major General; Michael D. Hall	30 August 1985	30 June 1987
8		Major General; Cecil W. Powell	30 June 1987	18 January 1990
9		Major General; Peter D. Robinson	19 January 1990	18 July 1991
10		Lieutenant General; Marcus A. Anderson	19 July 1991	22 November 1993
-		Colonel; John A. Judd; Acting	23 November 1993	12 December 1993
11		Major General; George B. Harrison	13 December 1993	22 June 1997
-		Colonel; Roger C. Locher; Acting	11 December 1996	18 December 1996
12		Major General; Jeffrey G. Cliver	23 June 1997	2 March 2000
13		Major General; William A. Peck Jr.	2 March 2000	25 February 2003
14		Major General; Felix Dupré	26 February 2003	28 April 2005
-		Colonel; Alison R. Hill; Acting	29 April 2005	14 June 2005
15		Major General; Robin E. Scott	15 June 2005	31 May 2007
-		Colonel; Alison R. Hill; Acting	1 June 2007	11 July 2007
16		Major General; Stephen T. Sargeant	12 July 2007	21 October 2010
17		Major General; David J. Eichhorn	22 October 2010	4 September 2012
18		Major General; Scott D. West	4 September 2012	30 April 2015
19		Major General; Matthew H. Molloy	18 June 2015	18 May 2018
20		Major General; Michael T. Brewer	18 May 2018	April 2020
21		Major General; James R. Sears Jr.	April 2020	19 July 2022
22		Major General; Michael T. Rawls	19 July 2022	9 August 2024
23		Major General; Michael R. Drowley	9 August 2024	16 September 2025
24		Brigadier General; Jesse J. Friedel	16 September 2025	Incumbent
