= John Edwards (missionary) =

American missionary (b. 1828, d. 1903)

- Born: January 21, 1828; Bath, New York
- Died: February 18, 1903 (aged 75); Oakland, California
- Occupations: Missionary, Teacher, School superintendent
- Years active: 1851-?
- Known for: Superintendent of Wheelock Academy
- Notable work: Rebuilding Wheelock Academy after the U.S. Civil War

John Edwards (1828-1903) was an American missionary who was sent to the homeland of the Choctaw Indians in the mid 19th century. Born in Bath, New York on January 21, 1828, he graduated from Princeton Seminary in 1848, and sent to the Choctaw Nation (now part of Southeastern Oklahoma), in 1851. He soon succeeded Alfred Wright as superintendent of the Wheelock Mission, but was forced to flee Indian Territory when a band of Confederate-supporting Choctaws and Texas troops threatened to hang him because he refused to support their side in 1861. Although he returned to Wheelock and attempted to help rebuild the mission complex, his health was too poor to let him remain. Instead, he died in Oakland, California on February 18, 1903. He was most noted for his services to Wheelock Mission (near what is now Eagletown, Oklahoma.)

== College education and posting to Choctaw Nation ==
Edwards attended college at Princeton, New Jersey and graduated in 1848. He then graduated from Princeton Theological Seminary in 1851. The American Board of Missions (ABM), sent Edwards and John Libby as missionary teachers to the Spencer Academy in the Choctaw Nation in 1851, but it wasn't long before he was transferred to Wheelock Academy, and became the de facto missionary. Dr. Alfred Wright, who had founded Wheelock in the early 1830s died in 1853 and was buried in the mission cemetery. . (Note: Harriett Wright, Alfred's's widow, left the mission within a year after her husband's death and died in Florida in 1863.)

== John Libby, Edwards' assistant ==
John Libby, who had originally come west with the Wrights, returned to the east to complete his studies at seminary. Having finished his studies, he returned to Wheelock in 1857 as an assistant to Edwards. Libby married a Choctaw woman (a graduate of Wheelock herself) and decided to remain at the mission after Edwards was ordered to return to his home in the North. The Libbys maintained the mission complex buildings and operated a day school intermittently throughout the Civil War and continued until 1869, when a great fire destroyed every building except the stone church.

== A narrow escape from death ==
Edwards had a narrow escape in May, 1861, when a posse of Texas soldiers and Choctaw men supporting the Confederacy came to search the mission for weapons, contraband, and Union supporters. They even asked Edwards to pledge that he would take up arms for the Southern cause. Edwards later wrote that he told them, "... You might as well ask me to strike my Mother. I was born in the North; my friends and kindred are still living there; I do not believe the Southern states have a right to secede, nor that the Government has given them any cause to rebel. What I wish to do is to stay here quietly and go on with my work for the Choctaws, not taking part in the War on either side. I am willing to give you my pledge to do nothing against you, and to abide by that to the death. Beyond that my conscience will not let me do.” Finding nothing, they cautioned him to leave the Territory, as they suspected him of sheltering Unionists. Three weeks later, a neighbor warned Edwards' wife that a group of men were on their way to hang her husband that day, and that he should leave their home at once. Edwards recounted that he immediately gave his keys to Mr. Libby and asked him to saddle his horse, then changed into a warmer suit of clothes, put some food into his saddle bags, took all the money from the house, said a prayer with his wife, and climbed into the saddle all within fifteen minutes after the neighbor arrived.

== Life in exile and return to Choctaw Nation ==
Little has been documented about Edwards' activities following his escape from the Confederate pursuers. He fled Indian Territory until sometime after the surrender at Appomattox, and apparently did not return until wartime passions had receded. His wife had wound up in California (probably staying with some relatives)until her husband rejoined her. Unfortunately, her health worsened and she died there in 1881, never returning to the Choctaw Nation. After her death, Edwards returned to the Choctaws, where the National School Board asked him to teach at an academy near Boggy Depot, while the tribal government figured out how to restore the devastated Wheelock Complex. Edwards agreed to teach for two years. The National School Board asked Edwards to return as Wheelock's superintendent when they reopened the facility in 1884. Edwards declined the opportunity, saying that his health had declined even more, and that they should select another man for the position. He would remain at Wheelock as a mentor until the end of the 1886-7 school year. (Note: The Choctaws ultimately selected Reverend William C. Robe as superintendent of the academy.)

== Remarriage, retirement and death ==
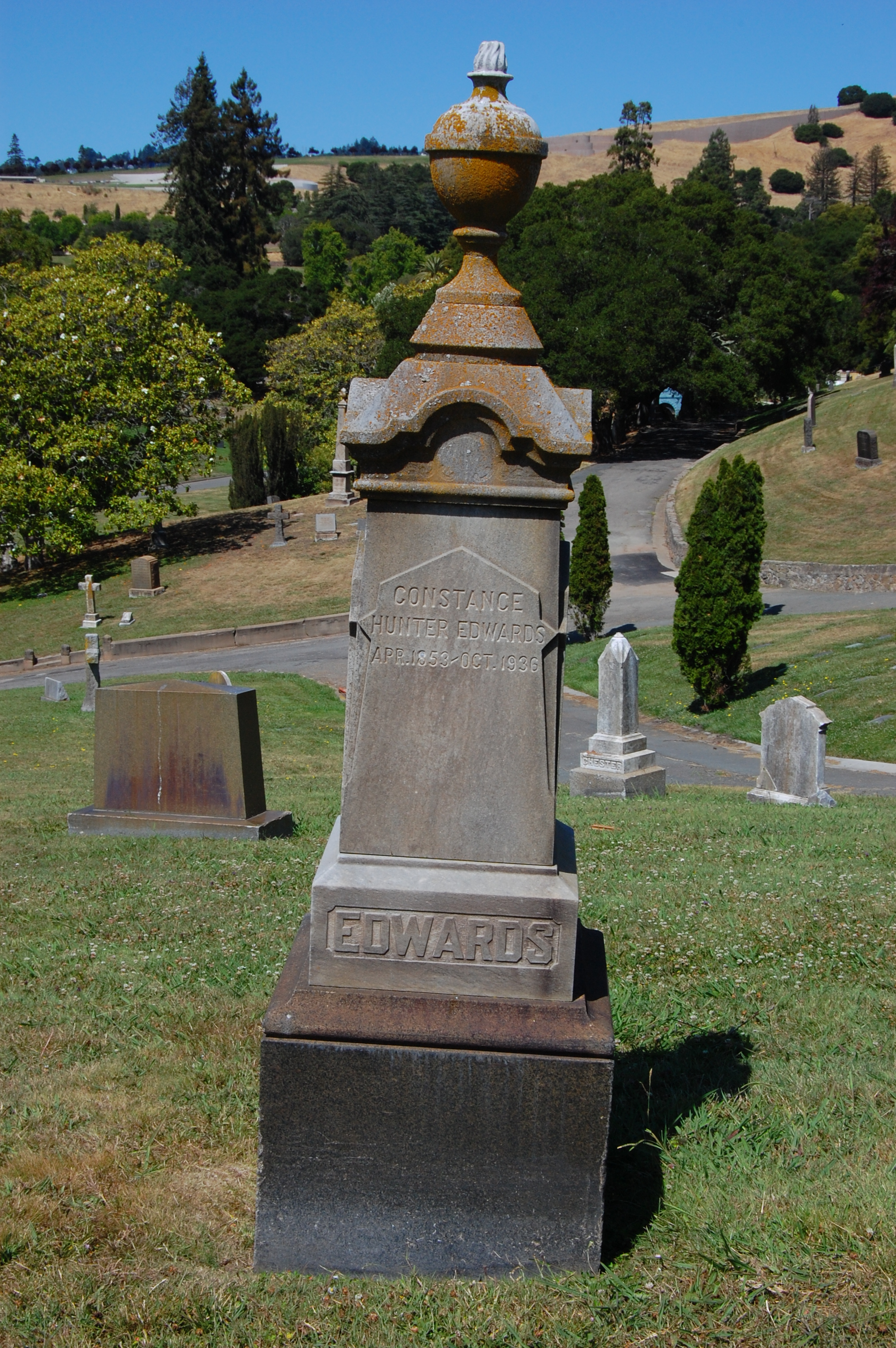
Grave

A Choctaw blog published an article describing the work of several young women who came to Wheelock Mission to support the activity there. The article contains one paragraph about Constance Lucretia Hunter (b. 1853 in Guernsey County, Ohio) who taught at the Wheelock school and became Edwards' second wife in 1884. It says that she retired with him to California in 1895. After his death, she moved to Oregon with her only child, and lived there until her own death in 1936.
