= Andrea Tullos =

U.S. Air Force general

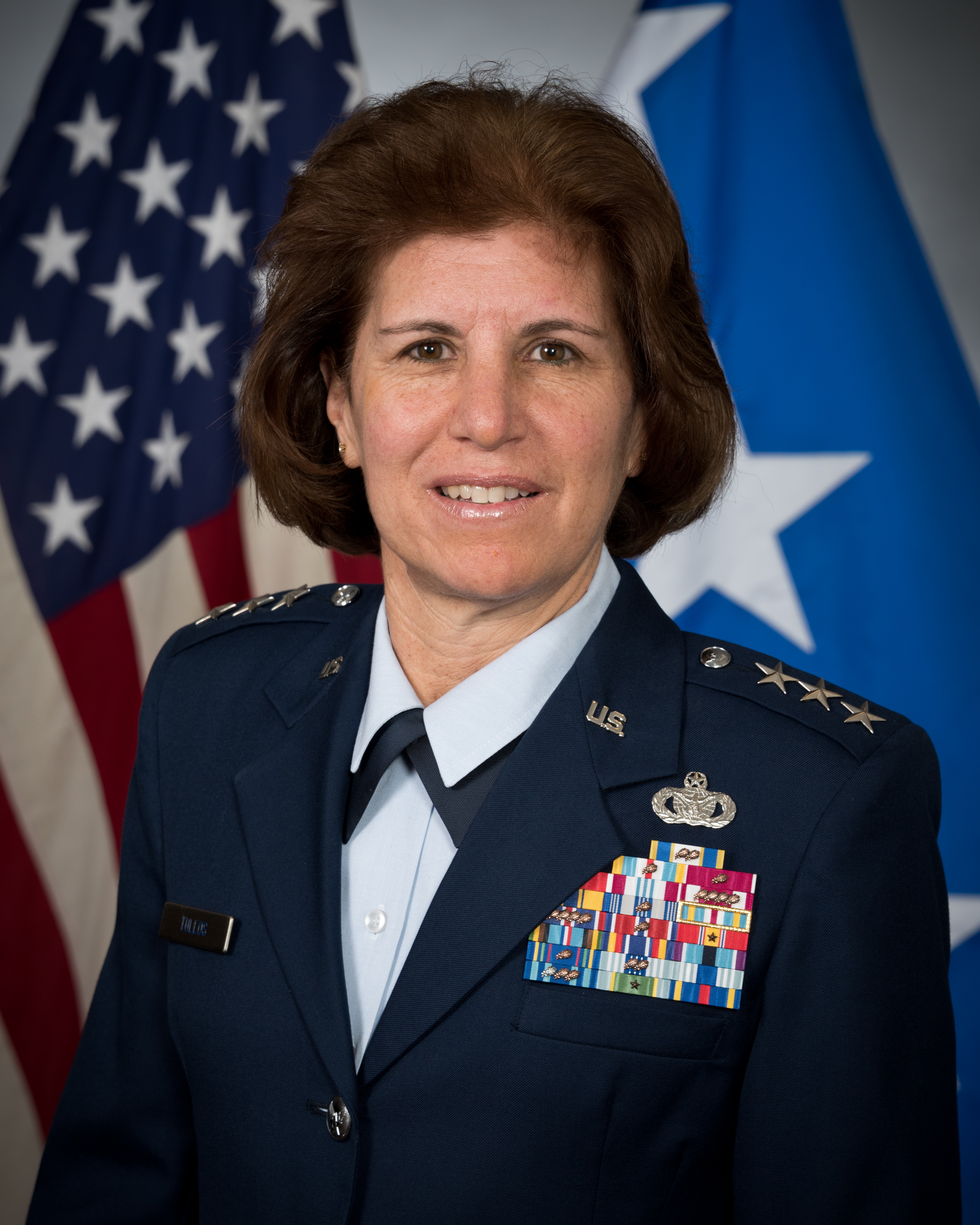
- Official portrait, 2025
- Military career
- Allegiance: United States
- Branch: United States Air Force
- Service years: 1992–2025
- Rank: Lieutenant General
- Commands: Air University; Second Air Force; 42nd Air Base Wing; 55th Mission Support Group; 379th Expeditionary Security Forces Squadron; 435th Security Forces Squadron; 568th Security Forces Squadron
- Awards: Air Force Distinguished Service Medal (3); Defense Superior Service Medal (2); Legion of Merit (2); Bronze Star Medal

Andrea D. Tullos is a retired lieutenant general in the United States Air Force who most recently served as the commander and president of the Air University. She previously held the position of deputy commander of the Air Education and Training Command and commanded the Second Air Force at Keesler Air Force Base. In April 2021, she was assigned as the deputy commander of the Air Education and Training Command, replacing Major General William A. Spangenthal. In May 2022, she was nominated for promotion to lieutenant general and assignment as the commander and president of Air University.

== Assignments ==
- February 1992–July 1993, Executive Officer to the Commander, 45th Support Group, and Wing Protocol Officer, 45th Space Wing, Patrick Air Force Base, Fla.
- September 1993–August 1996, Flight Commander, Convoy Commander, Squadron Section Commander, 377th Security Forces Squadron, Kirtland AFB, N.M.
- September 1996–December 1997, Student, Air Force Institute of Technology, Civilian Education Program, University of New Mexico, Albuquerque
- December 1997–March 2000, Chief of Current Operations Branch, Operations Division, Security Forces Directorate, Headquarters Air Combat Command, Langley AFB, Va.
- March 2000–March 2001, Operations Officer, 386th Expeditionary Security Forces Squadron, Southwest Asia
- April 2001–July 2002, Chief of Congressional Activities Branch, Directorate of Air and Space Operations, Headquarters U.S. Air Force, the Pentagon, Arlington, Va.
- July 2002–July 2003, Aide-De-Camp to the Vice Chief of Staff, Headquarters U.S. Air Force, the Pentagon, Arlington, Va.
- July 2003–May 2004, National Defense Fellow, Intermediate Developmental Education Fellowship, Office of the Foreign Policy Advisor, HAF, the Pentagon, Arlington, Va.
- June 2004–May 2005, Commander, 568th Security Forces Squadron, Ramstein Air Base, Germany
- May 2005–June 2006, Commander, 435th Security Forces Squadron, Ramstein AB, Germany
- July 2006–May 2008, Deputy Division Chief and Policy Planner, Iraq Division, Strategic Plans and Policy Directorate, Joint Staff, HAF, the Pentagon, Arlington, Va.
- June 2008–June 2009, Commander, 379th Expeditionary Security Forces Squadron, Southwest Asia
- July 2009–June 2010, Student, National War College, National Defense University, Fort Lesley J. McNair, Washington, D.C.
- June 2010–July 2011, Chief, Antiterrorism and Critical Infrastructure Protection Division, Operations Directorate, U.S. Pacific Command, Camp H.M. Smith, Hawaii
- July 2011–July 2013, Commander, 55th Mission Support Group, Offutt AFB, Neb.
- July 2013–May 2014, Chief, Arabian Peninsula and Iraq Division, Strategic Plans and Policy Directorate, Joint Staff, HAF, the Pentagon, Arlington, Va.
- May 2014–June 2016, Commander, 42nd Air Base Wing, Maxwell AFB, Ala.
- July 2016–August 2019, Director of Security Forces, Deputy Chief of Staff for Logistics, Engineering and Force Protection, HAF, the Pentagon, Arlington, Va.
- August 2019–August 2021, Commander, Second Air Force, Keesler AFB, Miss.
- August 2021–July 2022, Deputy Commander, Air Education and Training Command, Joint Base San Antonio-Randolph, Texas
- July 2022-November 2025, Commander and President, Air University, Maxwell AFB, Ala.

== Education ==
- 1991 Bachelor of Arts, Foreign Affairs, University of Virginia, Charlottesville
- 1997 Master of Arts, Sociology, University of New Mexico, Albuquerque

== Awards and decorations ==
Tullos's major awards and decorations include:

Awards and Decorations

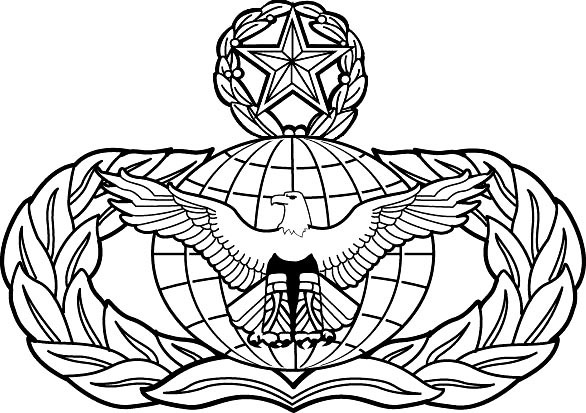

Badge	Air Force Master Force Protection Badge		
1st row	Air Force Distinguished Service Medal with two oak leaf clusters	Defense Superior Service Medal with one oak leaf cluster	Legion of Merit with oak leaf cluster
2nd row	Bronze Star Medal	Defense Meritorious Service Medal	Meritorious Service Medal with four oak leaf clusters
3rd row	Air and Space Commendation Medal	Air and Space Achievement Medal with one oak leaf cluster	Joint Meritorious Unit Award
4th row	Air and Space Outstanding Unit Award with four oak leaf clusters	Air and Space Organizational Excellence Award with one oak leaf cluster	National Defense Service Medal with service star
5th row	Armed Forces Expeditionary Medal	Global War on Terrorism Service Medal	Humanitarian Service Medal
6th row	Nuclear Deterrence Operations Service Medal with one oak leaf cluster	Air and Space Overseas Short Tour Service Ribbon with two oak leaf clusters	Air and Space Overseas Long Tour Service Ribbon
7th row	Air and Space Longevity Service Award with one silver and two bronze oak leaf clusters	Small Arms Expert Marksmanship Ribbon with one service star	Air and Space Training Ribbon

== Effective dates of promotion ==
Dates of rank are as follows:

Rank	Date
Second Lieutenant	12 February 1992
First Lieutenant	12 February 1994
Captain	12 February 1996
Major	1 October 2002
Lieutenant Colonel	1 December 2006
Colonel	1 October 2010
Brigadier General	2 August 2016
Major General	4 October 2019
Lieutenant General	25 July 2022

Military offices
Preceded by Allen J. Jamerson	Director of Security Forces of the United States Air Force; 2016–2019	Succeeded by Roy W. Collins
Preceded by Timothy J. Leahy	Commander of the Second Air Force; 2019–2021	Succeeded by Michele C. Edmondson
Preceded by William A. Spangenthal	Deputy Commander of the Air Education and Training Command; 2021–2022	Succeeded by James R. Sears Jr.
Preceded by William G. Holt; Acting	Commander and President of the Air University; 2022–2025	Succeeded by Daniel Tulley
