= William A. Spangenthal =

Air Education and Training Command deputy commander

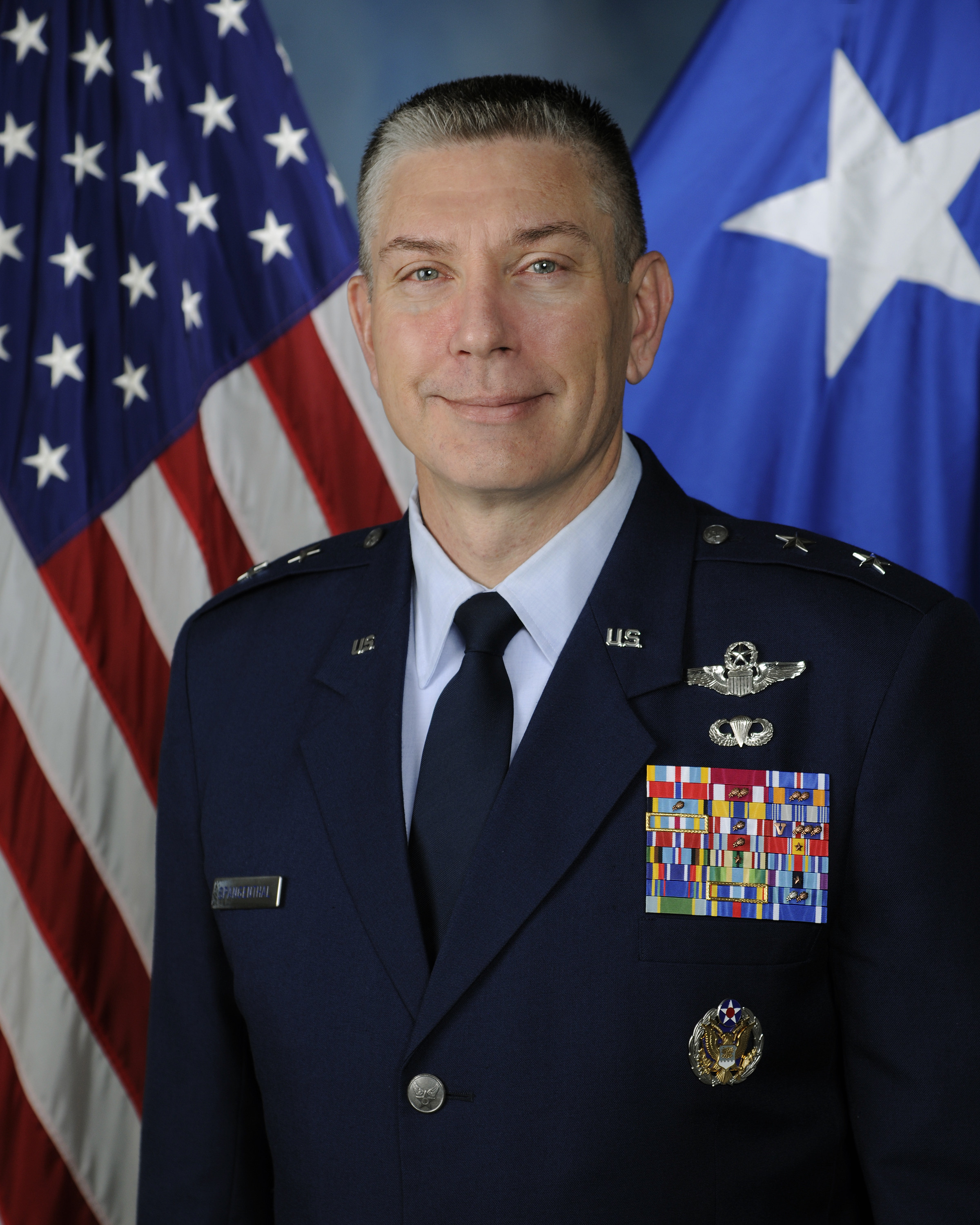
- Military career
- Allegiance: United States
- Branch: United States Air Force
- Service years: 1992–2021
- Rank: Major General
- Commands: 97th Air Mobility Wing; 376th Expeditionary Operations Group; 21st Airlift Squadron
- Awards: Defense Superior Service Medal; Legion of Merit (2); Distinguished Flying Cross; Bronze Star Medal

William A. Spangenthal is a retired United States Air Force major general who most recently was the deputy commander of the Air Education and Training Command. Prior to that, he was the director of operations and communications of the same command. He retired effective December 1, 2021.

Military offices
Preceded by Anthony B. Krawietz	Commander of the 97th Air Mobility Wing; 2013–2015	Succeeded by Todd Hohn
Preceded by Randall Reed	Director of the United States Secretary of the Air Force and Chief of Staff of the United States Air Force Executive Action Group; 2015–2017	Succeeded by Rodney D. Lewis
Preceded by Andrew A. Croft	Director of Plans, Programs, Requirements and Assessments of the Air Education and Training Command; 2017–2018	Succeeded by James R. Sears
Preceded by James R. Sears	Director of Operations and Communications of the Air Education and Training Command; 2018–2020	Succeeded by Jeannie Leavitt
Preceded by Mark E. Weatherington	Deputy Commander of the Air Education and Training Command; 2020–2021	Succeeded by Andrea Tullos
