= Wayne E. Whitlatch =

United States Air Force general

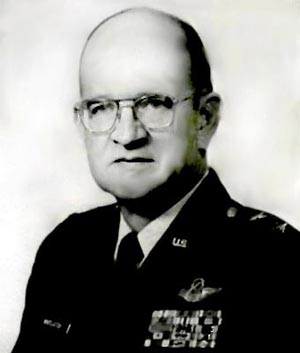
- Born: 9 October 1928; Nebraska City, Nebraska U.S.
- Died: 26 October 2017 (aged 89); San Antonio, Texas, U.S.
- Military career
- Allegiance: United States
- Branch: United States Air Force
- Service years: 1951–1982
- Rank: Major general
- Commands: Air Force Test and Evaluation Center; deputy chief of staff for operations and intelligence, NATO Allied Forces Central Europe
- Conflicts: World War II

Wayne E. Whitlatch (9 October 1928 – 26 October 2017) was a retired major general in the United States Air Force who served as commander of the Air Force Test and Evaluation Center from 1980 to 1982.
