= John Edward (disambiguation) =

John Edward (born 1969) is an American television personality, writer and self-proclaimed psychic medium.

John Edward may also refer to:

- John Edward (civil servant), EU and Scottish civil servant and campaigner
- Johnny Edward, British musician, writer and record producer, creator of the TV robot character Metal Mickey
- John Edward (MP) for Sandwich (UK Parliament constituency)
- John and Edward Grimes, more commonly known as Jedward, Irish musicians

== See also ==
- John Edwards (disambiguation)
