= Jack Edwards =

Jack Edwards may refer to:

== Sports ==
=== Association football ===
- Jack Edwards (footballer, born 1867) (1867–1960), English footballer for Preston North End
- Jack Edwards (footballer, born 1876) (1876–?), Welsh footballer for Aberystwyth Town
- Jack Edwards (footballer, born 1921) (1921–2009), English footballer for Rotherham United
- Jack Edwards (footballer, born 1924) (1924–1978), English footballer for Southampton and Nottingham Forest
- Jack Edwards (footballer, born 1929) (1929–2014), Welsh footballer and manager for Crystal Palace, Exeter City and Torquay United
- Jack Edwards (soccer), Australian soccer player

=== Australian rules football ===
- Jack Edwards (Australian footballer, born 1931) (1931–2014), Australian rules footballer for North Melbourne
- Jack Edwards (Australian footballer, born 1934), Australian rules footballer for Footscray

=== Cricket ===
- Jack Edwards (cricketer, born 1860) (1860–1911), Australian cricketer
- Jack Edwards (cricketer, born 2000), Australian cricketer

== Other people ==
- Jack Edwards (British politician) (1882–1960), Liberal MP for Aberavon
- Jack Edwards (British Army soldier) (1918–2006), former British WWII serviceman and a Japanese POW survivor who lived in Hong Kong
- Jack Edwards (American politician) (1928–2019), member of the U.S. House of Representatives from Alabama
- Jack Edwards (sportscaster) (born 1957), American NESN sports broadcaster
- Jack Edwards (YouTuber) (born 1998), British YouTuber and author

== Fictional ==
- Jack Edwards (EastEnders)

== See also ==
- Jackie Edwards (disambiguation)
- John Edwards (disambiguation)
