= Johnny Edwards (footballer) =

Australian rules footballer, born 1912

Personal information
- Full name: Johnny Edwards
- Born: 27 March 1912
- Died: 12 November 1973 (aged 61)
- Original team: Black Rock

Playing career^{1}
Years	Club	Games (Goals)
1932–33	North Melbourne	5 (0)
- ^{1} Playing statistics correct to the end of 1933.

Johnny Edwards (27 March 1912 – 12 November 1973) was an Australian rules footballer who played with North Melbourne in the Victorian Football League (VFL).
