= John Edwards Caldwell =

American author and politician

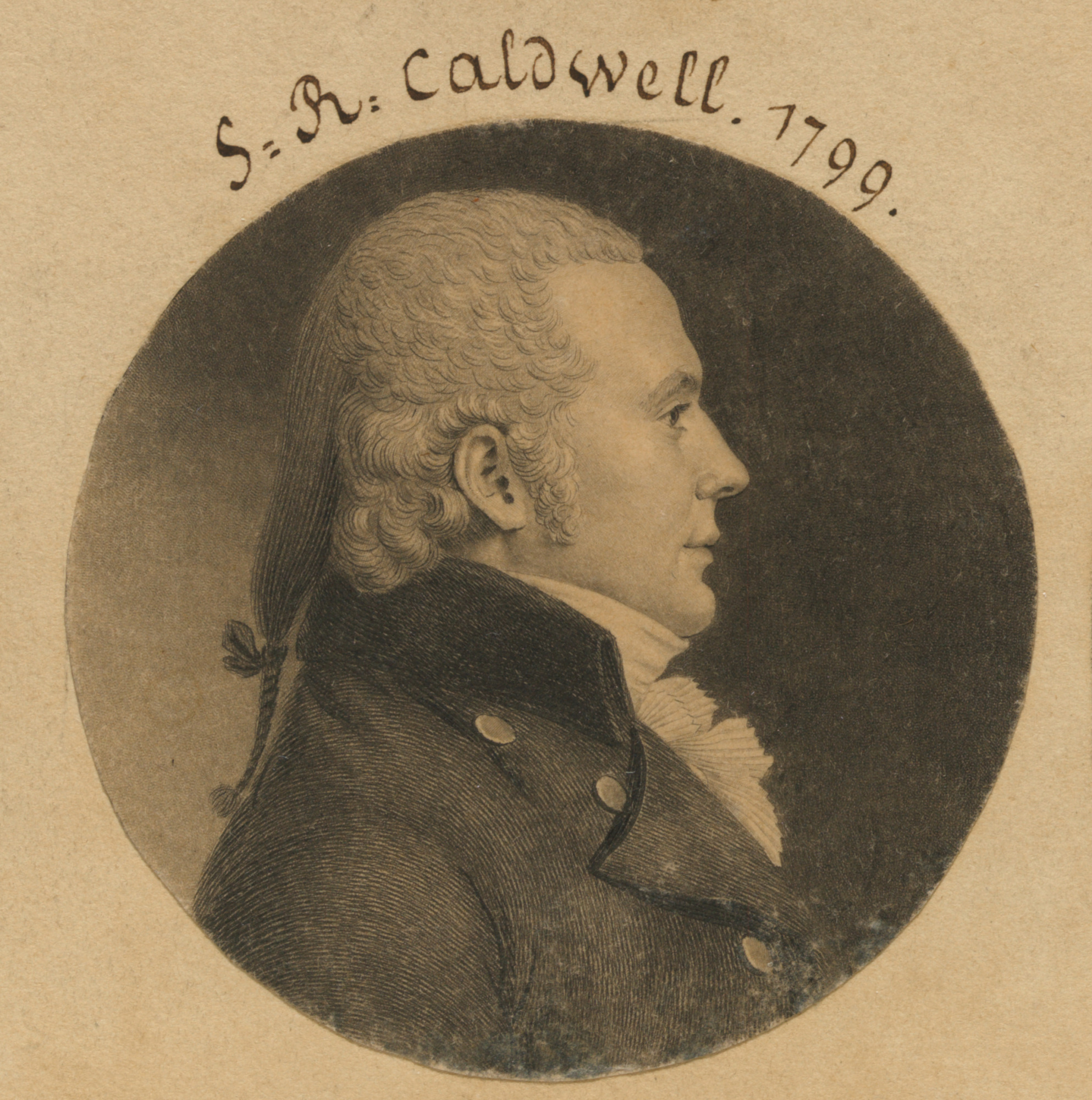
- Portrait of Caldwell by Charles Balthazar Julien Févret de Saint-Mémin, c. 1799.

Consular Agent for the West Indies and San Domingo
- In office 1801–1803
- President: Thomas Jefferson

Personal details
- Born: February 2, 1769 Elizabeth, New Jersey, British America
- Died: March 9, 1819 (aged 50) Manhattan, New York, United States
- Spouse: Hannah Wyck (m. 1805)
- Children: 1
- Relatives: James Caldwell (father)
- Known for: A Tour through Part of Virginia

John Edwards Caldwell (February 2, 1769—March 9, 1819) was an American author, philanthropist, and politician who co-founded the American Bible Society and the Christian Herald.

== Early life and family ==
Caldwell was born in 1769, the son of James Caldwell and Hannah Ogden. His father was a Presbyterian minister who played a prominent part in the American Revolution and was known as the "Fighting Parson". Caldwell's family home was burned by Loyalists in 1780.

After his father's murder in 1781, Caldwell was placed under the care of his legal guardian Elias Boudinot, who sent him to live in the home of Rev. Alexander MacWhorter. Caldwell was later adopted by Gilbert du Motier, Marquis de Lafayette, who took him with his family upon his return to France in 1782. Caldwell was educated in a French boarding school during that period. In 1785, Caldwell and the family of Lafayette dined with John Adams. In 1791, Caldwell returned to America and settled in Philadelphia, where his guardian Boudinot was living.

=== Marriage ===
In 1801, Caldwell married Hanna Wyck, and they had one daughter.

== Career ==
In June 1801, Caldwell received a recess appointment by President Thomas Jefferson as Consular Agent for the West Indies and San Domingo. His appointment was confirmed by the United States Senate in January 1802. In 1802, he wrote to then-Secretary of State James Madison and provided an account of American vessels in port. Caldwell later moved to New York City.

Caldwell was an early founder of the American Bible Society. In 1816, he made a founding donation to the society of $10,000. Caldwell was also the founder of the Christian Herald, and he served as editor and publisher of the first five volumes.

In 1809, Caldwell published his first book, A Tour through Part of Virginia, In the Summer of 1808.

== Death and legacy ==
Caldwell died in 1819 aged 50. He is buried at Middle Dutch Church.

His portrait is in the permanent collection of the National Portrait Gallery. The John Edwards Caldwell Papers are in the permanent collection of the Library of Congress, and his 1809 book A Tour through Part of Virginia is in the collection of the United States National Library of Medicine.

== Works ==
- A Tour through Part of Virginia, In the Summer of 1808, 1809.
- Some Account of the Islands of the Azores, 1809.
- Scenes from a Cave Tour, 1808.
- The Christian Herald: Volume I, 1816.
- The Christian Herald: Volume II, 1816.
- The Christian Herald: Volume III, 1817.
- The Christian Herald: Volume IV, 1817.
- The Christian Herald: Volume V, 1818.
