= Alfred Wright =

Alfred Cecil Wright (born 21 1848 Leamington Spa; died 7 January 1909 Nelson) was an Anglican priest in the second half of the nineteenth century and the first decade of the twentieth.

Wright was educated at Colchester Royal Grammar School and King's College London. He was ordained deacon in 1877, and priest in 1878. After a curacy in Wanstead he went to New Zealand. He served at Fernside, Prebbleton, Christchurch and Nelson. Returning to England he was at St Paul's, Onslow Square;Colgate; and Clifton. In 1893 he returned to New Zealand, and was at Greymouth then Richmond. He was Archdeacon of Waimea from 1895 to 1908. From 29 October to 5 December 1902 he accompanied the Bishop of Melanesia on a visit to the New Hebrides, Banks and Torres Islands.
