= John Edwards (Australian footballer) =

Australian rules footballer

Personal information
- Full name: John Edwards
- Born: 18 January 1942
- Original team: Footscray-Yarraville Socials
- Height: 188 cm (6 ft 2 in)
- Weight: 86 kg (190 lb)

Playing career^{1}
Years	Club	Games (Goals)
1962	Footscray	1 (0)
- ^{1} Playing statistics correct to the end of 1962.

John Edwards (born 18 January 1942) is a former Australian rules footballer who played with Footscray in the Victorian Football League (VFL).
