= Jack Edwards (Australian footballer, born 1934) =

Australian rules footballer

Personal information
- Full name: Jack Edwards
- Born: 1 March 1934
- Original team: Moonee Imperials
- Height: 180 cm (5 ft 11 in)
- Weight: 73 kg (161 lb)

Playing career^{1}
Years	Club	Games (Goals)
1952	Footscray	1 (0)
- ^{1} Playing statistics correct to the end of 1952.

Jack Edwards (born 1 March 1934) is a former Australian rules footballer who played with Footscray in the Victorian Football League (VFL).
