= John Edwards (1751–1832) =

John Edwards (1751–1832) was an Anglo-Irish soldier and poet.

== Life ==
Edwards was the eldest son of James Edwards of Old Court, County Wicklow, Ireland, by his wife Anne Tenison, second daughter of Thomas Tenison of Castle Tenison, County Roscommon, Ireland, a son of Archbishop Thomas Tenison. He became an officer of light dragoons in the volunteer army of Ireland, and rose to the rank of lieutenant-colonel. Edwards died owner of Old Court in 1832. He married Charlotte Wright, fifth daughter of John Wright of Nottingham, who bore him three sons and two daughters.

== Works ==
In honour of the force to which he belonged he wrote The Patriot Soldier: a Poem, Nottingham, 1784, 38 pp. He also published Kathleen: a Ballad from Ancient Irish Tradition, 1808; Abradates and Panthea; a Tragedy, 1808; Interests of Ireland, London, 1815, and an essay on the improvement of bank-notes, Liverpool, 1820.
