= John M. Edwards =

John M. Edwards M.S., F.R.C.S is an English physician who is the Hunterian Professor of Surgery at St Thomas' Hospital in London

== Biography ==
Edwards trained at St Thomas’ Hospital, where he won the Cheselden Gold Medal for surgery, the Beany Prize for Obstetrics and the Beany Prize for Clinical Anatomy.

On the rugby pitch, Edwards captained St Thomas’ Hospital and the United Hospitals Rugby team. He also played for Wales as an International U18.

Edwards is a founding member of the International Society of Lymphology and a Fellow of the American College of Nuclear Medicine.

== Publications ==
Edwards has authored and co-authored the following;

- Relief of lymph obstruction by use of a bridge of mesentery and ilieum J.B. Kinmouth, P.A Hurst, J.M. Edwards and D.L. Rutt
- Malignant Melanoma: Treatment by Endolymphatic Radio-Isotope Infusion J.M. Edwards (Annals of the Royal College of Surgeons of England Volume 44-May 1969 Pages 237-254)
- A review of operations for lymphoedema: J.M. Edwards, D. Negus and J.B. Kinmouth
- Lymphovenous Shunts in Man: J.M. Edwards: J.B. Kinmouth
- Endolymphatic Radiotherapy: R.W Lloyd-Davies, J.M. Edwards and J.B. Kinmouth
- Lymphography of the Testis and its Adnexa in the Normal and in Adiopathic Hydrocele: Michael P. O’Brien, J.M. Edwards and John. B Kinmouth
- The Value of Lymphography in the Management of Melanoma: J.M. Edwards (Clinical Radiology Vol. XX No. 4 October 1969)
- Endolymphatic Therapy for Malignant Melanoma by J.M. Edwards (from Melanoma and Skin Cancer New South Wales 1972)
- Lymphangiography and Surgery in Lymphangioma of the skin: J.M.Edwards, R.D.G. Peachey and J.B. Kinmouth
- Surgical excision of visceral metastases from malignant melanoma: A.R.L May and J.M. Edwards (Clinical Oncology 1976 2, 233-237)
- Investigation and management of cutaneous artieral insufficiency of the extremities: J.M. Edwards (Clinical and Experimental Dermatology 1982 7, 429-434)
- Shearing operation for incompetent perforating veins: J.M. Edwards (Br. J. Surg Vol 63 (1976)
- Endolymphatic Radiotherapy A Comparison of Radiogold and Radioiodine against the VX2 Tumor in the Rabbit: R.W. Lloyd-Davies, J.M. Edwards and J.B. Kinmouth
