= John Edwards (Canadian football) =

Canadian football player (1912–2005)

John F. Edwards
Profile
- Position: Halfback

Personal information
- Born: March 9, 1912; Ottawa, Ontario, Canada
- Died: July 9, 2005 (aged 93); Kingston, Ontario, Canada

Career information
- College: Queen's University; University of Michigan

Career history
- 1930: Ottawa Rough Riders
- 1934–1936: Queen's Golden Gaels
- 1937: Toronto Argonauts

Awards and highlights
- Grey Cup champion (1937)

John "Jake" Edwards (1912-2005) was a championship winning football player in the Canadian Football League (CFL) for one season for the Toronto Argonauts. He also had a long career as a football player and educator/administrator with the Queen's Golden Gaels.

Born in Ottawa, Edwards played briefly with his hometown Rough Riders before attending University of Michigan. He returned to Canada and studied at Queen's University, where he played football and was one of the famed "Fearless 14" Golden Gaels that won the 1934 Yates Cup. In 1937, Edwards played for the Toronto Argonauts, competing in all six regular season and three playoff games, helping them win the 25th Grey Cup.

Edwards returned to Queen's University in 1938, becoming a co-founder and first director of the School of Physical and Health Education. A lifelong sportsman and fan, he was inducted into the Kingston and District Sports Hall of Fame in 1997 and died on July 26, 2005.
