= Rodney D. Lewis =

U.S. Air Force general

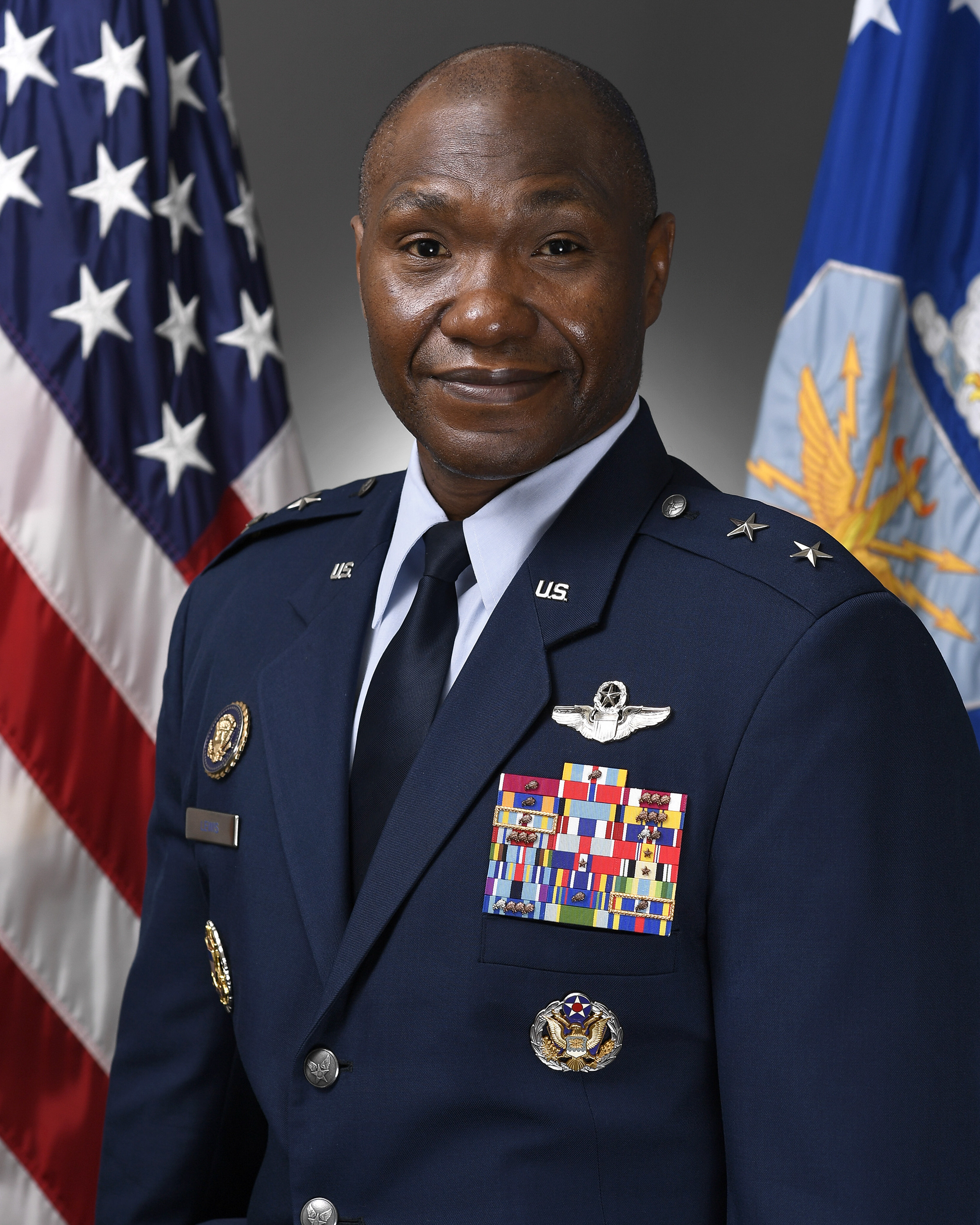
- Military career
- Allegiance: United States
- Branch: United States Air Force
- Service years: 1991–2023
- Rank: Major General
- Commands: 319th Air Base Wing; 4th Airlift Squadron
- Conflicts: Iraq War
- Awards: Defense Superior Service Medal (2); Legion of Merit (2); Bronze Star Medal

Rodney D. Lewis is a retired United States Air Force major general who last served as the deputy director for force protection of the Joint Staff and the Joint Integrated Air and Missile Defense Organization. He previously served as the Director of Strategy, Posture, and Assessments of the Air Force.

== Education ==
1991 Bachelor of Science, Human Factors Engineering, U.S. Air Force Academy, Colorado Springs, Colo.
1995 Master of Science, Systems Management, with honors, University of Southern California, Los Angeles, Calif.
1995 Squadron Officer School, Maxwell Air Force Base, Ala.
2003 Joint Air Command and Staff College, Maxwell AFB, Ala., by correspondence
2004 Marine Corps Command and Staff College, Quantico, Va., by correspondence
2005 Joint Professional Military Education II, Joint Forces Staff College, Norfolk, Va.
2006 Master of Science, Strategic Leadership-International Relations and Public Policy, Air Force Institute of Technology, Wright-Patterson AFB, Ohio
2007 Aspen Institute Socrates scholar, Aspen, Colo.
2007 Air War College, Maxwell AFB, Ala., by correspondence
2008 Navigating Public Policy, University of Washington, Tacoma, Wash.
2009 United States-Japan Foundation Leadership Program Fellow (2010-2011)
2011 White House Fellow, Office of the First Lady, Washington, D.C. (2011-2012)
2012 Air Force Fellow-National Security Forum, Air University, Maxwell AFB, Ala.
2012 Aspen Institute Ideas Scholar, Aspen, Colo.
2013 Georgetown Public Policy Institute, Executive Certificate Nonprofit Management, Washington, D.C.
2014 Harvard Business School Advanced Management Program, Boston, Mass.
2016 Enterprise Perspective Seminar, Washington, D.C.
2018 Aspen Institute Executive Seminar on Leadership, Values, and the Good Society, Aspen, Colo.
2019 The Government Affairs Institute at Georgetown University, Certificate in Legislative Studies, Washington, D.C.

== Assignments ==
1. August 1991–February 1992, Student Pilot, 7th Student Squadron, Vance Air Force Base, Okla.
2. February 1992–September 1992, Student Pilot, 26th Student Squadron, Vance AFB, Okla.
3. September 1992–September 1994, Flight Test Engineer, 417th Flight Test Squadron, Edwards AFB, Calif.
4. September 1994–September 1995, FTE, 412th Flight Test Wing, Edwards AFB, Calif.
5. September 1995–October 1996, Initial Cadre C-17 Globemaster III Pilot, 17th Airlift Squadron, Charleston AFB, S.C.
6. October 1996–September 1997, Executive Officer, 17th AS, Charleston AFB, S.C.
7. September 1997–April 1999, Pilot Scheduler, 17th AS, Charleston AFB, S.C.
8. April 1999–January 2000, Airlift Director, 17th AS, Charleston AFB, S.C.
9. January 2000–August 2000, Squadron Safety Officer, 17th AS, Charleston AFB, S.C.
10. August 2000–July 2002, C-17 Aircraft Commander, 701st AS, Air Force Reserve Command, Lowry AFB, Colo.
11. July 2002–January 2003, Chief, Current Operations, 16th AS, Charleston AFB, S.C.
12. January 2003–May 2003, Chief, 437th Airlift Wing Contingency Cell, Charleston AFB, S.C.
13. May 2003–May 2005, 437th Airlift Wing Executive Officer, Charleston AFB, S.C.
14. May 2005–May 2006, Air Force Institute of Technology, Wright-Patterson AFB, Ohio
15. June 2006–June 2008, Secretary of the Air Force, Office of Legislative Liaison, Washington, D.C.
16. July 2008–December 2009, Chief of Safety, Director of Staff, C-17 Instructor Pilot, Joint Base Lewis-McChord AFB, Wash.
17. December 2009–July 2011, Commander, 4th Airlift Squadron, JB Lewis-McChord, Wash.
18. September 2012–June 2014, Chief, Legislative/Interagency Affairs, U.S. Transportation Command, Washington, D.C.
19. August 2014–June 2015, Vice Commander, 3rd Wing, JB Elmendorf-Richardson, Alaska
20. July 2015–April 2017, Wing Commander, 319th Air Base Wing, Grand Forks AFB, N.D.
21. April 2017–June 2019, Director, SecAF/CSAF Executive Action Group, the Pentagon, Arlington, Va.
22. July 2019–August 2020, Deputy Director for Operations, Operations Team One, National Joint Operations and Intelligence Center, the Pentagon, Arlington, Va.
23. August 2020–June 2021, Director, Strategy, Posture, and Assessments, Deputy Chief of Staff, Strategy, Integration, and Requirements, Headquarters Air Force, the Pentagon, Arlington, Va.
24. June 2021–present, Deputy Director for Force Protection, J8, Joint Chiefs of Staff, the Pentagon, Arlington, Va.

== Dates of rank ==
Rank	Date
Second lieutenant	May 1, 1991
First lieutenant	May 3, 1993
Captain	May 1, 1995
Major	May 1, 2002
Lieutenant colonel	June 1, 2007
Colonel	March 1, 2013
Brigadier general	October 1, 2018
Major general	September 1, 2020

== Awards and decorations ==

Badge	Command Pilot Badge		
1st row	Defense Superior Service Medal with 1 bronze Oak leaf cluster		
2nd row	Legion of Merit with 1 bronze Oak leaf cluster	Bronze Star	Meritorious Service Medal with 3 bronze Oak leaf clusters
3rd row	Air Medal with 1 bronze Oak leaf cluster	Aerial Achievement Medal	Air Force Commendation Medal with 3 bronze Oak leaf clusters
4th row	Joint Meritorious Unit Award with 1 bronze Oak leaf cluster	Air Force Meritorious Unit Award with 1 bronze Oak leaf cluster	Air Force Outstanding Unit Award with 1 silver and 1 bronze Oak leaf clusters (7 awards)
5th row	Combat Readiness Medal with 3 bronze Oak leaf clusters	Air Force Recognition Ribbon with 1 bronze Oak leaf cluster	National Defense Service Medal with 1 Service star
6th row	Armed Forces Expeditionary Medal	Kosovo Campaign Medal with 1 Campaign star	Iraq Campaign Medal with 1 Campaign star
7th row	Global War on Terrorism Expeditionary Medal	Global War on Terrorism Service Medal	Armed Forces Service Medal
8th row	Humanitarian Service Medal	Nuclear Deterrence Operations Service Medal	Air Force Expeditionary Service Ribbon
9th row	Air Force Longevity Service Award with 1 silver and 3 bronze Oak leaf clusters (9 awards)	Small Arms Marksmanship ribbon	Air Force Training Ribbon
badges	Joint Chiefs of Staff Identification Badge	Presidential Service Badge	Headquarters Air Force badge

Military offices
Preceded by Paul E. Bauman	Commander of the 319th Air Base Wing; 2015–2017	Succeeded by Jeremy Thiel; Acting
Preceded by William A. Spangenthal	Director of the United States Secretary of the Air Force and Chief of Staff of the United States Air Force Executive Action Group; 2017–2019	Succeeded by John R. Edwards
Preceded by Brad M. Sullivan	Deputy Director for Operations (Operations Team One) of the Joint Staff; 2019–2020	Succeeded by Frederick O'Donnell
Preceded by David W. Hicks	Director of Strategy, Posture, and Assessments of the United States Air Force; 2020–2021	Succeeded by ???
Preceded by John V. Fuller	Deputy Director for Force Protection of the Joint Staff; 2021–2023	Succeeded by Roy W. Collins
