= John R. Edwards (general) =

U.S. Air Force general

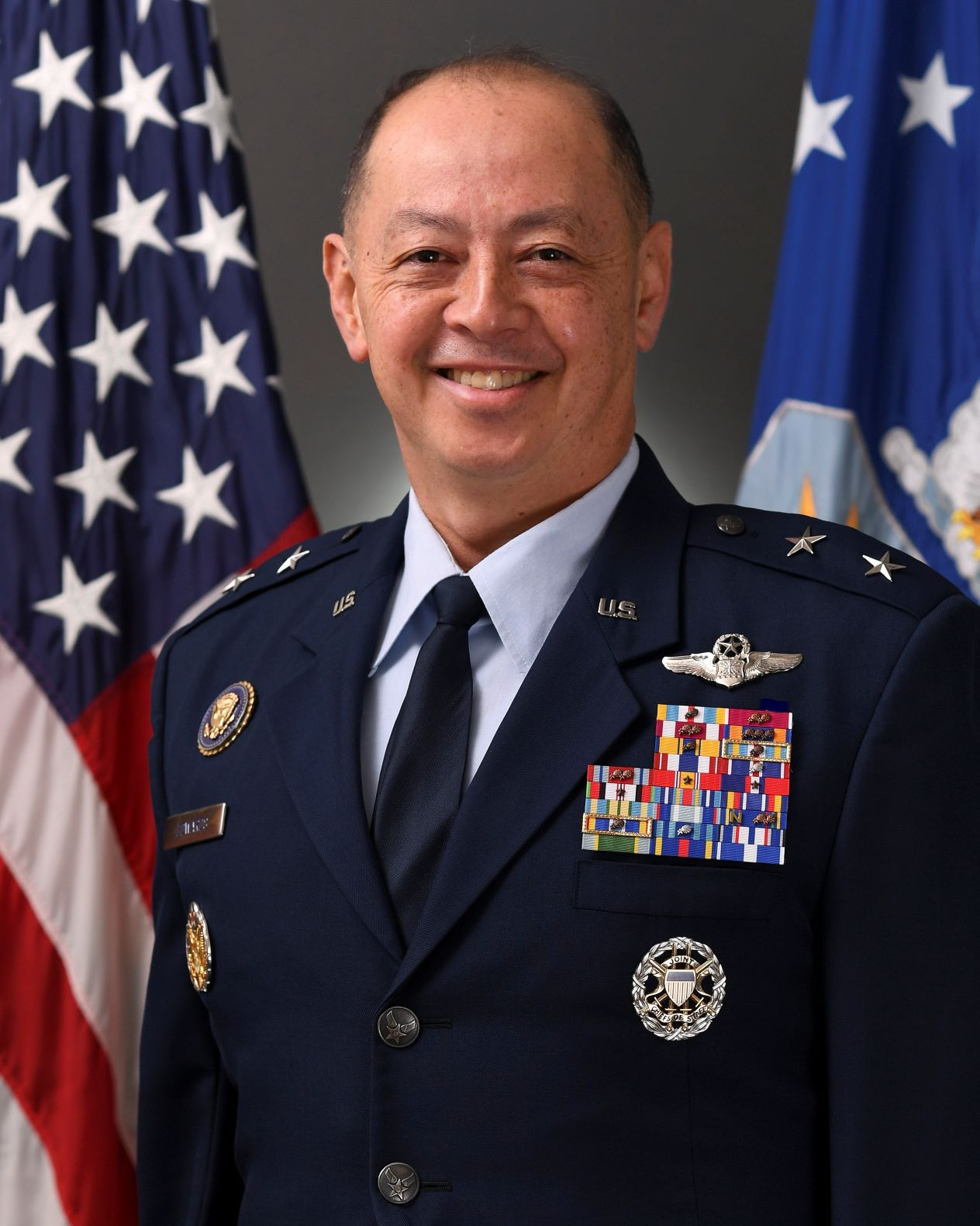
- Official portrait, 2024
- Military career
- Allegiance: United States
- Branch: United States Air Force
- Service years: 1995–present
- Rank: Major General
- Commands: 28th Bomb Wing; 479th Flying Training Group; 96th Bomb Squadron
- Awards: Defense Superior Service Medal; Legion of Merit (3)

John R. Edwards is a United States Air Force major general who serves as the director of global power programs at the Office of the Assistant Secretary of the Air Force for Acquisition, Technology, and Logistics. He previously served as the director for strategic capabilities policy on the National Security Council at the White House.

Edwards was born in Saigon, South Vietnam to an American father and Vietnamese mother. His father was an Army Special Forces soldier at 5th Special Forces Group who later served as a civilian with the U.S. Navy. He was brought up in Honolulu, Hawaii, graduating from the University of Hawaii and commissioning as a second lieutenant in the Air Force in 1995. He is a Master Combat Systems Officer with more than 2,500 flight hours including 237 combat hours in operations Allied Force and Enduring Freedom. He has served as the director of the Nuclear Enterprise Directorate of the Defense Threat Reduction Agency since June 2020. He previously commanded the 28th Bomb Wing.

Edwards served as the Director of the United States Secretary of the Air Force and Chief of Staff of the United States Air Force Executive Action Group from 2019 to 2020. Earlier, he commanded the 28th Bomb Wing at Ellsworth Air Force Base in Rapid City, South Dakota; the 479th Flying Training Group at Naval Air Station Pensacola, Florida; and the 96th Bomb Squadron at Barksdale Air Force Base, Louisiana. He has served in several positions on the Joint Chiefs of Staff and the Air Force Air Staff. He holds graduate degrees from the George Washington University, School of Advanced Air and Space Studies, and Air Command and Staff College. He was the national defense visiting fellow at the Stimson Center from 2012 to 2013.

In December 2023, Edwards was confirmed by the U.S. Senate and promoted to major general.

Military offices
Preceded by Thomas B. Shank	Commander of the 479th Flying Training Group; 2015–2017	Succeeded by Joel L. Carey
Preceded by Gentry W. Boswell	Commander of the 28th Bomb Wing; 2017–2019	Succeeded by David A. Doss
Preceded by Rodney D. Lewis	Director of the United States Secretary of the Air Force and Chief of Staff of the United States Air Force Executive Action Group; 2019–2020	Succeeded by Debra A. Lovette
Preceded by John D. Spencer	Director of the Nuclear Enterprise Directorate of the Defense Threat Reduction Agency; 2020–2022	Succeeded by Peter M. Bonetti
Preceded by Ty W. Neuman	Director for Strategic Capabilities Policy at the United States National Security Council; 2022–2024	Succeeded by ???
Preceded by Mark B. Pye	Director of Global Power Programs at the Office of the Assistant Secretary of the Air Force for Acquisition, Technology, and Logistics; 2024–present	Incumbent
