= John Robert Edwards =

John Robert Edwards FRSC (born 3 December 1947, Southampton, England) received a PhD from McGill University in 1974. After working as a Research Fellow at the Educational Research Centre in Dublin (now part of Dublin City University), he moved to Nova Scotia and joined the Psychology Department at St Francis Xavier University, where he is now Professor Emeritus and a Senior Research Professor. He is also an adjunct professor (graduate studies) at Dalhousie University in Halifax. He has been a Visiting Lecturer at many universities, and a visiting professor in England (University of Bristol), Ireland (Trinity College Dublin) and China (Minzu University, Beijing). He is an Honorary Professor at the Hong Kong Polytechnic University. Edwards is a fellow of the British Psychological Society (as of 1989), the Canadian Psychological Association (also 1989), and the Royal Society of Canada (2000).

His main research interest is with the establishment, maintenance and continuity of group identity, with particular reference to language in both its communicative and symbolic aspects. He has lectured and presented papers on this topic in some thirty countries, and his work has been translated into half-a-dozen languages. He is the author of a dozen books, and editor of five. He has also written some 300 articles, chapters and reviews.

Edwards is or has been an editorial-board member for about twenty international language journals and several book series. He was the Editor of the Journal of Multilingual and Multicultural Development (now published by Routledge) for twenty-five years, and remains as Reviews Editor. He was for twenty years the Editor of the Multilingual Matters book series for the Bristol publisher of the same name, a series that now comprises more than 150 titles; he is now the co-editor of the series. He is a member of half-a-dozen scholarly societies devoted to language, nationalism and their ramifications.

For a decade (1990-1999), he was the Chair of the Canadian Ethnic Studies Advisory Committee, a panel within the Department of Multiculturalism & Citizenship (now the Department of Canadian Heritage) that assessed applications for research grants, research fellowships and the establishment of university chairs.

Edwards was given the St Francis University President’s Research Award (in 1995) and its University Research Award (in 2008). In 2012 he received the Gardner Award for research in bilingualism from the International Association of Language and Social Psychology.

== Selected works ==
- Edwards, J. (1979). Language and Disadvantage. London: Edward Arnold / New York: Elsevier-North Holland. [2nd edition, 1989]
- Edwards, J. (ed.) (1981). The Social Psychology of Reading. Silver Spring, Maryland: Institute of Modern Languages.
- Edwards, J. (1983). The Irish Language: An Annotated Bibliography of Sociolinguistic Publications, 1772-1982. New York: Garland.
- Edwards, J. (ed.) (1984). Linguistic Minorities, Policies and Pluralism. London & New York: Academic Press.
- Edwards, J. (1985). Language, Society and Identity. Oxford: Basil Blackwell. [Chinese edition, 1994]
- Edwards, J. (1994). Multilingualism. London: Routledge. [Penguin paperback edition, 1995]
- Edwards, J. (ed.) (1998). Language in Canada. Cambridge: Cambridge University Press. [Paperback edition, 2010]
- Edwards, J. (2008 and 2009). Un món de llengües / Un mundo de lenguas. Barcelona: Editorial Aresta.
- Edwards, J. (2009). Language and Identity. Cambridge: Cambridge University Press.
- Edwards, J. (2010). Language Diversity in the Classroom. Bristol: Multilingual Matters.
- Edwards, J. (2010). Minority Languages and Group Identity: Cases and Categories. Amsterdam: John Benjamins. [Paperback edition, 2011]
- Edwards, J. (2011). Challenges in the Social Life of Language. London: Palgrave Macmillan.
- Edwards J. (2012). Multilingualism: Understanding Linguistic Diversity. London and New York: Continuum / Bloomsbury.
- Edwards, J. (2013). Sociolinguistics: A Very Short Introduction. New York and Oxford: Oxford University Press.
- Edwards, J. (2014). The Irish Language: An Annotated Bibliography of Sociolinguistic Publications, 1772-1982. London and New York: Routledge. [New edition]
- Edwards, J. (2023). Multilingualism: Understanding Linguistic Diversity. (2nd edition, revised and enlarged). London and New York: Bloomsbury.

== General references ==
- Edwards, John Robert (biographical entry by W. F. Mackey in the Concise Encyclopedia of Sociolinguistics [Pergamon, 2001]).
- Edwards, John (biographical entry by Hans Ladegaard in the Encyclopedia of Applied Linguistics [Oxford, 2013]).
