= List of elections in 1855 =

The following elections occurred in the year 1855.

== Africa ==
- 1855 Liberian general election

== Europe ==
- 1855 Belgian general election
- 1855 Danish Folketing election
- 1855 Faroese general election

== North America ==
=== Canada ===
- 1855 Newfoundland general election

=== United States ===
- 1855 New York state election

==== United States Senate ====
- 1854 and 1855 United States Senate elections
- 1855 United States Senate special election in Massachusetts
- 1855 United States Senate election in New York
- 1855 United States Senate election in Wisconsin

==== United States House of Representatives ====
- 1854 and 1855 United States House of Representatives elections

==== United States lieutenant gubernatorial ====
- 1855 California lieutenant gubernatorial election
- 1855 Connecticut lieutenant gubernatorial election
- 1855 Texas lieutenant gubernatorial election
- 1855 Wisconsin lieutenant gubernatorial election

==== United States gubernatorial ====
- 1855 Alabama gubernatorial election
- 1855 California gubernatorial election
- 1855 Connecticut gubernatorial election
- 1855 Georgia gubernatorial election
- 1855 Kentucky gubernatorial election
- 1855 Louisiana gubernatorial election
- 1855 Maine gubernatorial election
- 1855 Massachusetts gubernatorial election
- 1855 Mississippi gubernatorial election
- 1855 New Hampshire gubernatorial election
- 1855 Ohio gubernatorial election
- 1855 Rhode Island gubernatorial election
- 1855 Tennessee gubernatorial election
- 1855 Texas gubernatorial election
- 1855 Vermont gubernatorial election
- 1855 Virginia gubernatorial election
- 1855 Wisconsin gubernatorial election

==== United States mayoral elections ====
- 1855 Boston mayoral election
- 1855 Chicago mayoral election
- 1855 Manchester, New Hampshire, mayoral election

== Oceania ==
- 1855 New Zealand general election
- 1855 South Australian colonial election

== See also ==
- Category:1855 elections
