= List of elections in 1856 =

The following elections occurred in the year 1856.

== North America ==
=== Central America ===
- 1856 Honduran presidential election
- 1856 Salvadoran presidential election

=== United States ===
- 1856 New York state election
- 1856 United States elections

==== United States Presidential ====
- 1856 United States presidential election

==== United States Senate ====
- 1856 and 1857 United States Senate elections
- 1856 United States Senate election in Pennsylvania

==== United States House of Representatives ====
- 1856 United States House of Representatives elections
- 1856 United States House of Representatives election in Florida

==== United States lieutenant gubernatorial ====
- 1856 Connecticut lieutenant gubernatorial election
- 1856 Illinois lieutenant gubernatorial election
- 1856 Missouri lieutenant gubernatorial election

==== United States gubernatorial ====
- 1856 Arkansas gubernatorial election
- 1856 Connecticut gubernatorial election
- 1856 Florida gubernatorial election
- 1856 Illinois gubernatorial election
- 1856 Indiana gubernatorial election
- 1856 Maine gubernatorial election
- 1856 Massachusetts gubernatorial election
- 1856 Michigan gubernatorial election
- 1856 Missouri gubernatorial election
- 1856 New Hampshire gubernatorial election
- 1856 New Jersey gubernatorial election
- 1856 New York gubernatorial election
- 1856 North Carolina gubernatorial election
- 1856 Rhode Island gubernatorial election
- 1856 South Carolina gubernatorial election
- 1856 Vermont gubernatorial election

==== United States mayoral elections ====
- 1856 Boston mayoral election
- 1856 Chicago mayoral election
- March 1856 Manchester, New Hampshire, mayoral election
- November 1856 Manchester, New Hampshire, mayoral election
- 1856 Philadelphia mayoral election

== South America ==
=== Chile ===
- 1856 Chilean presidential election

=== Ecuador ===
- 1856 Ecuadorian presidential election

== See also ==
- Category:1856 elections
