= List of elections in 1854 =

The following elections occurred in the year 1854.

== North America ==
=== Central America ===
- 1854 Salvadoran presidential election

=== United States ===
- 1854 New York state election
- 1854 United States elections

==== United States Senate ====
- 1854 and 1855 United States Senate elections

==== United States House of Representatives ====
- 1854 United States House of Representatives elections
- 1854 United States House of Representatives election in Florida
- 1854 United States House of Representatives elections in New York

==== United States lieutenant gubernatorial ====
- 1854 Connecticut lieutenant gubernatorial election

==== United States gubernatorial ====
- 1854 Connecticut gubernatorial election
- 1854 Delaware gubernatorial election
- 1854 Iowa gubernatorial election
- 1854 Maine gubernatorial election
- 1853-54 Massachusetts gubernatorial election
- 1854 Massachusetts gubernatorial election
- 1854 Michigan gubernatorial election
- 1854 New Hampshire gubernatorial election
- 1854 New York gubernatorial election
- 1854 North Carolina gubernatorial election
- 1854 Pennsylvania gubernatorial election
- 1854 Rhode Island gubernatorial election
- 1854 South Carolina gubernatorial election
- 1854 Vermont gubernatorial election

==== United States mayoral elections ====
- 1853–54 Boston mayoral election
- December 1854 Boston mayoral election
- 1854 Chicago mayoral election
- 1854 Manchester, New Hampshire mayoral election
- 1854 New York City mayoral election
- 1854 Philadelphia mayoral election

== See also ==
- Category:1854 elections
