= 1857 Connecticut lieutenant gubernatorial election =

- April 1, 1857

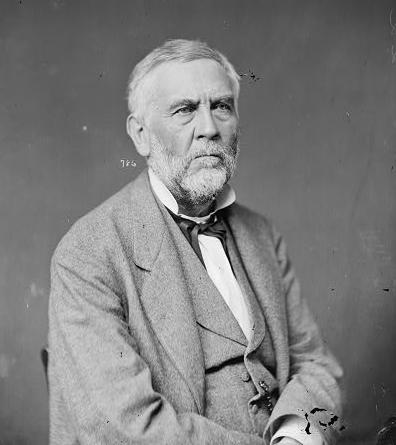
Nominee	Alfred A. Burnham	John T. Wait
Party	Republican	Democratic
Popular vote	31,753	31,104
Percentage	50.50%	49.50%
Lieutenant Governor before election
Albert Day
Know Nothing
Elected Lieutenant Governor
Alfred A. Burnham
Republican

The 1857 Connecticut lieutenant gubernatorial election was held on April 1, 1857, to elect the lieutenant governor of Connecticut. Republican nominee and former member of the Connecticut House of Representatives Alfred A. Burnham won the election against Democratic nominee John T. Wait.

== General election ==
On election day, April 1, 1857, Republican nominee Alfred A. Burnham won the election with 50.50% of the vote, thereby gaining Republican control over the office of lieutenant governor. Burnham was sworn in as the 48th lieutenant governor of Connecticut on May 6, 1857.

=== Results ===
Connecticut lieutenant gubernatorial election, 1857
Party	Candidate	Votes	%
Republican	Alfred A. Burnham	31,753	50.50
Democratic	John T. Wait	31,104	49.50
	Scattering	36	0.00
Total votes		62,893	100.00
Republican gain from Know Nothing			
