= William T. Minor =

American judge and politician from Connecticut (1815–1889)

William Thomas Minor
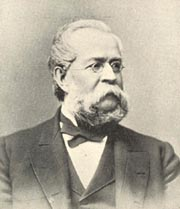

39th Governor of Connecticut
- In office May 2, 1855 – May 6, 1857
- Lieutenant: William Field; Albert Day
- Preceded by: Henry Dutton
- Succeeded by: Alexander H. Holley

Member of the Connecticut Senate from Connecticut's 12th Senate district
- In office 1854–1855
- Preceded by: Thomas B. Butler
- Succeeded by: Orris S. Ferry

Member of the Connecticut House of Representatives from Stamford
- In office 1841–1848
- Preceded by: Andrew Perry
- Succeeded by: Heth Stephens, Samuel Lockwood, Jr.

Personal details
- Born: October 3, 1815 Stamford, Connecticut, U.S.
- Died: October 13, 1889 (aged 74) Stamford, Connecticut, U.S.
- Party: American (1855-1857); Republican (1857-1889)
- Spouse: Mary Catherine Leeds Minor
- Children: 5
- Education: Yale University
- Profession: Politician, lawyer, judge

William Thomas Minor (October 3, 1815 – October 13, 1889) was an American judge and politician from Connecticut. He served as the 39th governor of Connecticut, consul-general to Havana, Cuba and judge on the Connecticut Superior Court.

== Biography ==
Minor was born in Stamford, Fairfield County, Connecticut, on October 3, 1815, to Simeon Hinman Minor and Catherine Lockwood Minor. He studied at Yale University and graduated in 1834. Minor taught school for five years while he studied law under his father, a former Connecticut legislator.

== Career ==
In 1840, Minor was admitted to the bar and began the practice of law in Stamford. Minor became a member of the Connecticut House of Representatives in 1841, and served in that position until 1848. He was a judge for the Fairfield County, Connecticut Court. He married Mary Catherine Leeds on April 16, 1849, and they had five children. He became a member of the Connecticut State Senate representing the 12th District in 1854.

As candidate of the American Party, Minor was elected Governor of Connecticut in 1855 over Samuel Ingham by the Connecticut General Assembly by a 177 to 70 vote. He was re-elected to a second term in 1856 by the Connecticut General Assembly, again over Ingham, by a vote of 135 to 116. While Governor, Minor was a supporter of lengthening the period of residency before naturalization. He also supported the dismissal of six military companies that consisted mostly of Irishmen. This step further enraged immigrants. Legislation was passed that deprived suffrage to men unable to read the state constitution. He supported better schools in Connecticut and held the belief that the schools should be free for all the children in the state. He also supported the antislavery measures of the Republicans. He was not a candidate for the governorship in the election of April 1857, and left office on May 6, 1857.

In 1864, Minor was a delegate from Connecticut to the Republican National Convention, which assembled at Baltimore in June of that year. He voted with his delegation for Abraham Lincoln for president and Andrew Johnson for vice-president of the United States. In July 1864, Minor was appointed by Lincoln as Consul-General to Havana, Cuba. Three years later he returned to Connecticut and spent one year as a member of the Connecticut House of Representatives. In 1868, he was appointed judge on the Connecticut Superior Court, and served in that position until 1873 when he resigned his judgeship and returned to his private law practice. He also served on the 1879 commission that reconciled an extended boundary argument with New York.

== Death ==
Minor died on October 13, 1889, in Stamford. He is interred at Woodland Cemetery in Stamford.

Party political offices
First	Know Nothing nominee for Governor of Connecticut; 1855, 1856	Succeeded by None
Political offices
Preceded by Henry Dutton	Governor of Connecticut; May 2, 1855–May 6, 1857	Succeeded by Alexander H. Holley
Connecticut State Senate
Preceded by Thomas B. Butler	Member of the Connecticut Senate from Connecticut's 12th Senate district 1854–1855	Succeeded by Orris S. Ferry
Connecticut House of Representatives
Preceded by Andrew Perry	Member of the Connecticut House of Representatives from Stamford; 1841–1848	Succeeded by Heth Stephens, Samuel Lockwood, Jr.
