= Alexander Holley =

Alexander Holley may refer to:

- Alexander H. Holley (1804–1887), governor of Connecticut, 1857–58
- Alexander Lyman Holley (1832–1882), mechanical engineer
