= 1857 Connecticut gubernatorial election =

- April 6, 1857
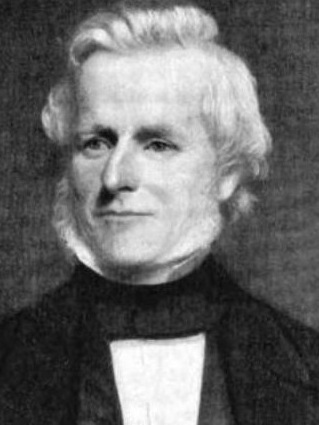

Nominee	Alexander H. Holley	Samuel Ingham
Party	Republican	Democratic
Popular vote	31,709	31,156
Percentage	50.44%	49.56%
- Holley: 50–60% 60–70% 70–80% Ingham: 50–60% 60–70% 70–80% Tie: 40–50%
Governor before election
William T. Minor
Know Nothing
Elected Governor
Alexander H. Holley
Republican

The 1857 Connecticut gubernatorial election was held on April 6, 1857. Former Lieutenant Governor and Republican nominee Alexander H. Holley defeated former congressman and Democratic nominee Samuel Ingham with 50.44% of the vote.

== General election ==
=== Candidates ===
Major party candidates

- Alexander H. Holley, Republican
- Samuel Ingham, Democratic

=== Results ===
1857 Connecticut gubernatorial election
Party	Candidate	Votes	%	±%
Republican	Alexander H. Holley	31,709	50.44%	
Democratic	Samuel Ingham	31,156	49.56%	
Majority		553		
Turnout				
Republican hold		Swing		
