= 1848 Connecticut gubernatorial election =

- April 3, 1848
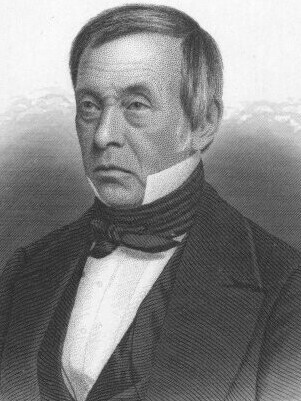

Nominee	Clark Bissell	George S. Catlin
Party	Whig	Democratic
Popular vote	30,717	28,525
Percentage	50.38%	46.79%
- Bissell: 40–50% 50–60% 60–70% 70–80% Catlin: 40–50% 50–60% Tie: 40–50% No Vote/Data
Governor before election
Clark Bissell
Whig
Elected Governor
Clark Bissell
Whig

The 1848 Connecticut gubernatorial election was held on April 3, 1848. Incumbent Governor and Whig nominee Clark Bissell was re-elected, defeating former congressman and Democratic nominee George S. Catlin with 50.38% of the vote.

This was the last such election in which the Whig Party won a majority of the popular vote. Their vote share would steadily decline over each of the next eight elections, ending with their last appearance in the 1856 Connecticut gubernatorial election. The Whigs would only win two more of these eight elections, by the votes of the state legislature. It was also the last appearance of the Liberty Party.

== General election ==
=== Candidates ===
Major party candidates

- Clark Bissell, Whig
- George S. Catlin, Democratic

Minor party candidates

- Francis Gillette, Liberty

=== Results ===
1848 Connecticut gubernatorial election
Party	Candidate	Votes	%	±%
Whig	Clark Bissell (incumbent)	30,717	50.38%	
Democratic	George S. Catlin	28,525	46.79%	
Liberty	Francis Gillette	1,728	2.83%	
Majority		2,192		
Turnout				
Whig hold		Swing		
