= Governor Bissell =

Governor Bissell may refer to:

- Clark Bissell (1782–1857), 34th Governor of Connecticut
- William Henry Bissell (1811–1860), 11th Governor of Illinois
