= 1856 Connecticut lieutenant gubernatorial election =

- April 2, 1856
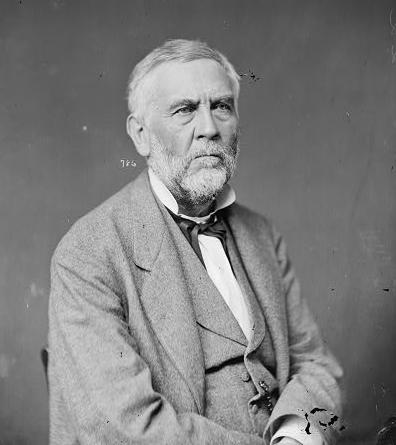

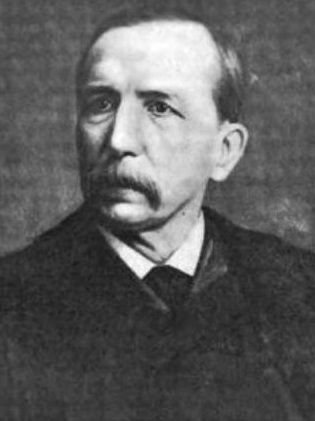
Nominee	John T. Wait	Albert Day	Henry Baldwin Harrison
Party	Democratic	Know Nothing	Republican
Popular vote	32,657	25,910	6,920
Percentage	48.80%	38.80%	10.40%
Lieutenant Governor before election
William Field
Free Soil
Elected Lieutenant Governor
Albert Day
Know Nothing

The 1856 Connecticut lieutenant gubernatorial election was held on April 2, 1856, to elect the lieutenant governor of Connecticut. Democratic nominee John T. Wait received a plurality of the votes against Know Nothing nominee Albert Day and Republican nominee and incumbent member of the Connecticut Senate Henry Baldwin Harrison. However, since no candidate received a majority in the popular vote, Albert Day was elected by the Connecticut General Assembly per the Connecticut Charter of 1662.

== General election ==
On election day, April 2, 1856, Democratic nominee John T. Wait won a plurality of the vote by a margin of 6,747 votes against his foremost opponent Know Nothing nominee Albert Day. However, as no candidate received a majority of the vote, the election was forwarded to the Connecticut General Assembly, who elected Albert Day, thereby gaining Know Nothing control over the office of lieutenant governor. Day was sworn in as the 47th lieutenant governor of Connecticut on May 7, 1856.

=== Results ===
Connecticut lieutenant gubernatorial election, 1856
Party	Candidate	Votes	%
Know Nothing	Albert Day	25,910	38.80
Democratic	John T. Wait	32,657	48.80
Republican	Henry Baldwin Harrison	6,920	10.40
	Scattering	1,268	2.00
Total votes		66,855	100.00
Know Nothing gain from Free Soil			
