= 1856 Baltimore Know-Nothing riots =

Civil conflict in Baltimore, USA

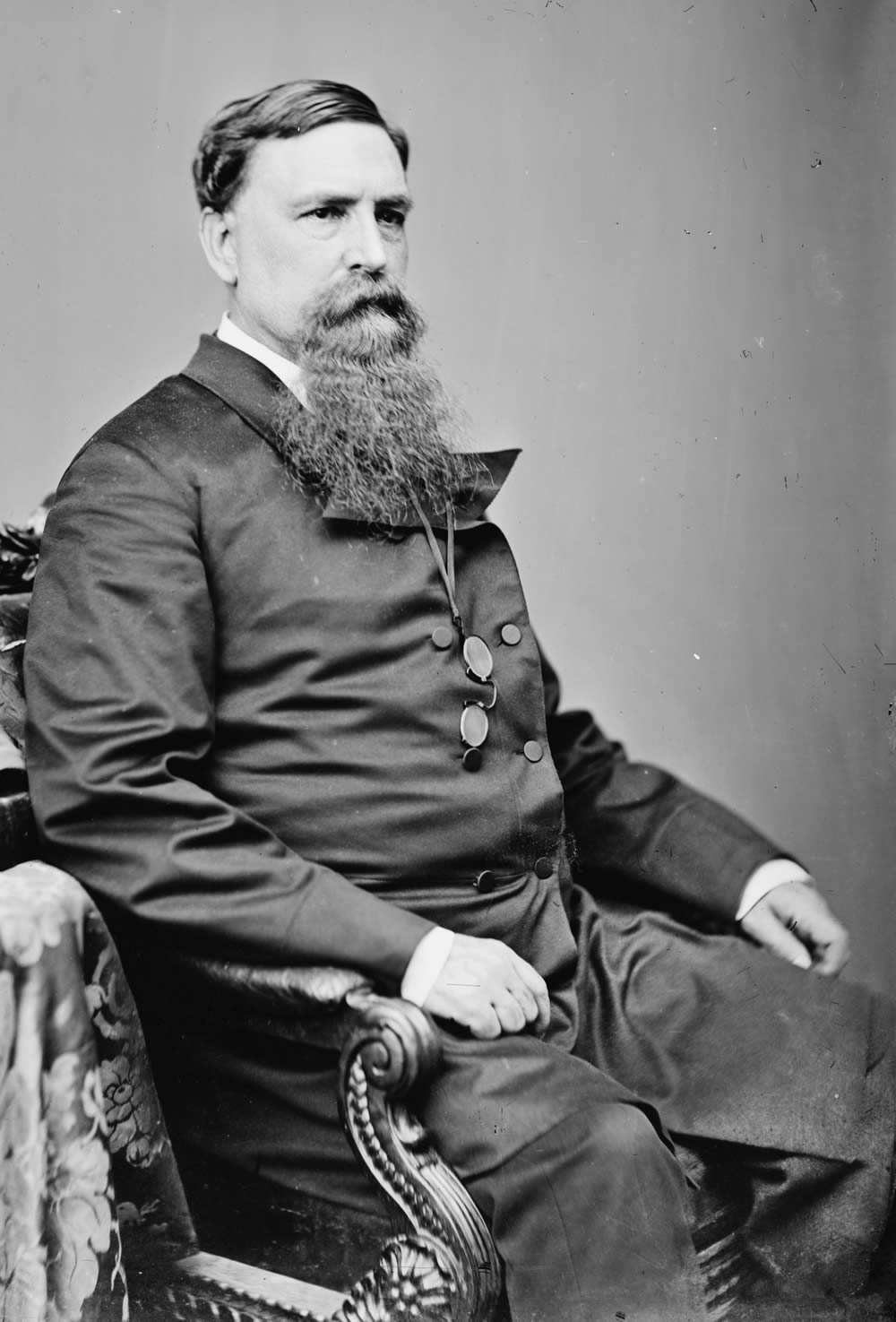
Know-Nothing candidate Thomas Swann was elected Mayor of Baltimore in 1856 amidst violence and a heavily disputed ballot.

The Baltimore Know-Nothing riots of 1856 occurred in Baltimore, Maryland between September and November of that year. The Know Nothing Party gained traction in Baltimore as native-born residents disliked the growing immigrant population. Local street gangs became divided on political grounds, with the Know-Nothing affiliated gangs clashing with gangs affiliated with the Democratic Party. The partisans were involved in widespread violence at the polls and across Baltimore during municipal and national elections that year.

== Know-Nothing Party platform ==
The Know-Nothing Party originated in New York in 1844, when the American Republican Party officially split from the American Whig Party. The Know-Nothing Party's central policies were nativist, or hostile to immigrants. Nativists feared that the immigrants would use their voting power to elect unsuitable politicians, given the generalization that immigrants were aligned with radical political groups and typically worked in low paying jobs. Know-Nothing policies were highly anti-Catholic, as Know-Nothings feared that Catholics were more loyal to the church than the government. Irish Catholics were the main targets of nativist discrimination in the nineteenth century.

== Origins of the Know-Nothing Party in Baltimore ==
The Know-Nothing Party gained traction in Baltimore as the population of immigrants grew during the 1850s, and immigrants competed with native-born Americans for jobs. In 1850, twenty percent of Baltimore's population were immigrants, and by 1854, immigrants made up about twenty-five percent of the total population. Historian Jean H. Baker argues that sixty percent of the state population were Methodists who often associated Catholicism with stereotypes of immoral behavior among immigrants,.

The Party's first meeting in Baltimore took place on August 18, 1853, with about 5,000 people in attendance. The party's central policies called for secularization of public schools, complete separation of church and state, freedom of speech, and regulating immigration. The first Know-Nothing candidate elected into office in Baltimore was Mayor Samuel Hinks in 1855.

=== Geography of politics in Maryland ===
In the 1850s, ethnic groups often separated themselves into "territories" that neither those native born nor immigrants dared to cross. The Lexington Market area was predominantly Democratic while Know-Nothings generally lived in the Federal Hill area in Baltimore By 1857 Know-Nothings dominated cities in eastern and western Maryland. The cities of St. Michaels and St. Fredericks, with larger immigrant populations, were heavily Know-Nothing, showing hostility between native-born and immigrants that lived in the same place. Areas which were predominantly Democratic were higher in Catholic and immigrant populations, such as Leonardtown.

== Violence in Baltimore ==
=== Formation of Baltimore street gangs ===
Baltimore street gangs formed in the early 19th century but became more formally organized around the 1830s. The New Market Fire Company became notorious in Baltimore, often feuding with the gang called the Rip Raps. Street gangs in Baltimore developed connections with politicians from opposing political parties in the 1830s. The founding members of the Plug Uglies street gang were strongly nativist.

=== General violence ===
Baltimore was given the nickname "Mob-Town" because of a longer history of rioting and a poorly staffed police force that did little to stop the violence. Historian Jean H. Baker argues that violence regularly broke out in Baltimore on days when men did not have to work, and riots were very likely to break out during weekend activities such sporting events and festivals. Historian David Grimsted argues that there was at least one large riot yearly between local fire companies in Baltimore 1856–1861, and the tolerance for this violence by political figures was "but a step to the election riots that disgraced Baltimore."

=== Election violence ===
Violence on election days was especially common in nineteenth century Baltimore, as polling places were located in predominantly native-born districts, so immigrants traveling to these polling places were often targeted by nativist rivals. Historian Jean H. Baker argues that both Democrats and Know-Nothings in Baltimore used "press, pamphlet, and political speech," to promote violence in the name of political gains.

== 1856 election riots ==
=== September 12th riot ===
September 12, 1856, on the celebration of Baltimore's founding, local Know-Nothing associated gangs the Blood Tubs, the Wampanoags, and the Rip Raps raided a tavern and fired shots. Two people were killed, and around twenty were injured. This riot solidified Baltimore's reputation of lawlessness in nationwide newspaper coverage.

=== Municipal election riot on October 8th ===
The days leading up to the municipal election on October 8, were already marked by violence between the Democrats and Know-Nothings. A riot ensued on October 5, 1856, when Democrats tore down a Know-Nothing flag. The Democrats, trying to ward off the Know-Nothings, took cover in a nearby home and brandished a cannon. Police interfered, arresting several Democrats.

The next day, October 6, 1856, a shootout ensued after Know-Nothings provoked Democrats on Baltimore Street. Know-Nothings also sacked a tavern owned by Democrat Sam McElwee in the Centre Market area. Know-Nothings were about to raid the Democrat "Empire House" but were apprehended by police. Know-Nothings fled from the police towards Jones' Falls, ending in a fifteen-minute shootout on Holliday Street between the rival parties.

Election day October 8, 1856, was marked with violence in twenty city wards in Baltimore. Democrats incited a riot in the eighth ward, nicknamed "The Irish Eighth," when Democrats tried to drive Know-Nothings out of the eighth ward's polls, and a shootout occurred on Monument Street. Three Democrats were killed. The same day another riot took place when Know-Nothing affiliated Rip Raps plundered the Democratic New Market Fire Company firehouse in the Lexington Market Area. Two Know-Nothings died in the crossfire. Historian Tracy Matthew Melton argues that the widespread riots of the day signified the deadliest outburst of violence in Baltimore history at that point.

The partisans involved were overwhelmingly well-known fighting men with deep connections to the street violence of the fire companies. During the fighting at Lexington Market, Rip Raps specifically targeted the tavern owned by Petty Naff, the New Market's most notorious rowdy. Petty Naff was a target for Know-Nothing rivals as he led the New Market Fire Company. Naff was notorious in Baltimore for his history of conflict with the police, involvement in riots, assault charges, and his alleged connection to the murder of two men.

=== National and state election riot November 4th ===
National and state elections took place on November 4, 1856. Mayor Swann ordered the Maryland Light Division of Infantry to be on standby, but it was never put to action during the violence of that day, and Swann refused Governor Ligon's offering of military reinforcement. Tensions over whether or not the results of the election would be fairly polled resulted in election violence. In Baltimore's 6th ward, a mob fired a cannon at police. In the 2nd ward, Know-Nothings were thrown out of polling stations by Democrats, but Democrats were eventually curbed by Know-Nothings from the 4th ward who provided back-up. 67 people were injured and 17 died in the events of the riot. Know-Nothing Candidate for President Millard Fillmore was victorious in Baltimore, receiving 16,900 votes. Maryland was the only state in which Fillmore won votes in the electoral college.

== Response and continued violence ==
=== Government response ===
In the aftermath of the 1856 election riots, charges were pressed against only two men involved. Charges were dropped against one man and the other man was acquitted. Historian Tracy Matthew Melton argues that local street gangs' affiliation with the Know-Nothing or the Democratic parties allowed them to commit acts of violence without consequences.

On December 1, 1856, a bill was presented to the City Council that would strengthen the police force. The new force, led by a Marshal, would consist of 397 men of the Mayor's choosing. All officers were to be given a fixed pay, a baton, a gun, and an official uniform. Baltimore would be separated into districts where police would surveil the streets at all times. The bill was approved by Mayor Swann on January 1, 1857, and went into effect March 1, 1857.

In the city elections of 1857, officials hoped to better prepare to control instances of election violence. Governor Thomas Ligon ordered George H. Steuart's militia of over 3,000 men because he felt that local authorities did not adequately respond to violence. Ligon was met with criticism by Mayor Swann, who argued that it was unconstitutional for the governor to order a militia without seeking permission first. Local officials ruled that Ligon did not have legal grounds to call a militia and did not provide enough evidence to support the need for one. Mayor Swann instead ordered 200 special policeman to support the existing force on election day. Additionally, Mayor Swann reinforced the existing police force, adding 105 men. The strengthened police force proved to be ineffective, as policemen did little to interfere during outbreaks of violence during election. To prevent violence at the polls, the city wards were redrawn and the number of polling stations increased, but the two parties would freely relocate the polls themselves. The Democratic Party in Baltimore asked voters to submit evidence of voter suppression by Know-Nothings.

=== Continued violence ===
Election violence and fraud in Baltimore continued in the following years despite efforts to stop it. In the 1857 gubernatorial election, riots were less common but voter suppression was employed by Know-Nothings. Know-Nothings would beat anyone who was not voting on a Know-Nothing Ballot, marked by a red stripe. Know-Nothing candidate Thomas Holliday Hicks was elected governor, and assured that he would "Never call on a militia the night before an election," like Governor Ligon did.
According to Frank Towers, in 1860, the Democrats took control of the state legislature and they acted forcefully in Baltimore. They took back the city police, the militia, patronage, and the electoral machinery, and prosecuted some Know-Nothings for electoral fraud. By 1861, the remnants of the Know-Nothing movement had split over secession and federal forces took control of Baltimore.

== See also ==
- 1856 United States presidential election
- Baltimore railroad strike of 1877
- Baltimore riot of 1861
- Samuel Hinks
- Know-Nothing Party
- Know-Nothing Riots in United States politics
- List of incidents of civil unrest in the United States
- Presidential Election of 1856
- Thomas Swann
- Xenophobia in the United States

== References and further reading ==
- Baker, Jean H. (1977). Ambivalent Americans: The Know-Nothing Party in Maryland. Johns Hopkins University Press. ISBN 0-8018-1906-7.
- Evitts, William J. (1974). A Matter of Allegiances: Maryland from 1850 to 1861. Johns Hopkins University Press. ISBN 0-8018-1520-7.
- Grimsted, David (1998). American Mobbing, 1828-1861: Toward Civil War. Oxford University Press. ISBN 978-0-19-535366-2.
- Levine, Bruce (2001). "Conservatism, Nativism, and Slavery: Thomas R. Whitney and the Origins of the Know Nothing Party". The Journal of American History. 88 (2): 455–488. doi:10.2307/2675102. JSTOR 2675102.
- Melton, Tracy Matthew (2005). Hanging Henry Gambrill: The Violent Career of Baltimore's Plug Uglies, 1854-1860. The Press at The Maryland Historical Society. ISBN 0-938420-93-3.
- Prince, Carl E. (1985). "The Great 'Riot Year': Jacksonian Democracy and Patterns of Violence in 1834". Journal of the Early Republic. 5 (1): 1–19.
- Ritter, Luke (2012). "The St. Louis Know-Nothing Riot of 1854: Political Violence and the Rise of the Irish". Gateway Heritage Magazine. 32: 27–35.
- Towers, Frank (1998). "Violence as a tool of party dominance: election riots and the Baltimore know-nothings, 1854–1860". Maryland Historical Magazine. 93: 5–37.
- Tuska, Benjamin R. (1925). "Know-Nothingism in Baltimore 1854-1860" (PDF). The Catholic Historical Review. 11 (2): 217–251. JSTOR 25012185.
