= Joseph W. Hubbell =

Connecticut politician

1st, 3rd and 8th Warden of the Borough of Norwalk, Connecticut
- In office 1831–1839
- Preceded by: Office established
- Succeeded by: Clark Bissell
- In office 1840–1842
- Preceded by: Clark Bissell
- Succeeded by: William J. Street
- In office 1855–1856
- Preceded by: Samuel Lynes
- Succeeded by: Dimon Fanton

Member of the Connecticut House of Representatives from Norwalk
- In office 1839–1841 Serving with Algernon Beards
- Preceded by: Lewis Gregory, Timothy Merwin
- Succeeded by: Clark Bissell, Henry Selleck

Personal details
- Born: October 12, 1800 Connecticut
- Died: February 13, 1884 (aged 83) Norwalk, Connecticut
- Spouse: Mary Ann Parrott (m. December 23, 1823)
- Children: Joseph W. Hubbell (1825–1826), Susan M. Hubbell Coleman, Joseph W. Hubbell (b. 1830), Allen P. Hubbell, Frederick T. Hubbell, Charles Hubbell

Joseph W. Hubbell (October 12, 1800 – February 13, 1884) was a member of the Connecticut House of Representatives from Norwalk from 1839 to 1841, and the first Warden of the Borough of Norwalk after its incorporation. He served from 1836 to 1839, from 1840 to 1842 and from 1855 to 1856.

He was born on October 12, 1800, the son of Aaron Hubbell and Sarah Silliman.

Preceded by Office established	Warden of the Borough of Norwalk, Connecticut; 1831–1839	Succeeded by Clark Bissell
Preceded by Lewis Gregory; Timothy Merwin	Member of the Connecticut House of Representatives from Norwalk; 1839; With: Algernon Beards	Succeeded by Clark Bissell; Henry Selleck
Preceded by Clark Bissell	Warden of the Borough of Norwalk, Connecticut; 1840–1842	Succeeded by William J. Street
Preceded by Samuel Lynes	Warden of the Borough of Norwalk, Connecticut; 1855–1856	Succeeded by Dimon Fanton
