= Benjamin Isaacs =

American politician

Member of the Connecticut Senate from the 12th District
- In office 1836–1837
- Preceded by: Charles Hawley
- Succeeded by: Charles Hawley

Member of the Connecticut House of Representatives from Norwalk
- In office May 1813 – May 1814 Serving with Thomas Reed, Moses W. Reed
- Preceded by: Jabez Gregory, Thomas Reed
- Succeeded by: Moses W. Reed, John Eversley
- In office May 1815 – May 1817 Serving with Thaddeus Betts, John Eversley, Samuel B. Warren
- Preceded by: Jacob Osborne, Lewis Mallory
- Succeeded by: Samuel B. Warren, William J. Street
- In office October 1818 – 1821 Serving with Moses Gregory, Andrew Hanford, Dan Taylor
- Preceded by: William J. Street, Dan Taylor
- Succeeded by: Moses Gregory, James Quintard, Jr.
- In office 1822–1823 Serving with Noah Wilcox
- Preceded by: Moses Gregory, James Quintard, Jr.
- Succeeded by: Moses Gregory, Noah Wilcox
- In office 1824–1826 Serving with Thomas Reed, Moses Gregory
- Preceded by: Moses Gregory, Noah Wilcox
- Succeeded by: Thomas Reed, David Roberts
- In office 1827–1829 Serving with Samuel B. Warren, Moses Gregory
- Preceded by: Thomas Reed, David Roberts
- Succeeded by: Charles Wiley Taylor, Clark Bissell
- In office 1834–1835 Serving with Samuel Comstock
- Preceded by: Thomas B. Butler, John D. Lounsbury
- Succeeded by: Noah Wilcox, Charles W. Taylor

Personal details
- Born: July 17, 1778 Norwalk, Connecticut
- Died: July 25, 1846 (aged 68) Norwalk, Connecticut
- Spouse: Fanny Bryan (m. November 18, 1798)
- Children: Richard Isaacs, Elizabeth Isaacs Lynes, Ann T. Isaacs St. John, Isaac S. Isaacs, Sophia Isaacs Lockwood, William B. Isaacs
- Occupation: merchant

Benjamin Isaacs (July 17, 1778 – July 25, 1846) was a member of the Connecticut Senate representing the 12th District from 1836 to 1837, and a member of the Connecticut House of Representatives in the sessions of May and October 1813, May and October 1815, May and October 1816, May 1817, October 1818, and the years 1819, 1820, 1822, 1824, 1825, 1827, 1828, and 1834.

He was the son of Isaac Scudder Isaacs and Susanna St. John Isaacs.

He was the parish clerk of St. Paul's on the Green from 1815 to 1846.

He served as town clerk of Norwalk from 1814 to 1844.

Preceded by Jabez Gregory; Thomas Reed	Member of the Connecticut House of Representatives from Norwalk; May 1813 – May 1814; With: Thomas Reed, Moses W. Reed	Succeeded by Moses W. Reed; John Eversley
Preceded by Jacob Osborne; Lewis Mallory	Member of the Connecticut House of Representatives from Norwalk; May 1815 – May 1817; With: Thaddeus Betts, John Eversley, Samuel B. Warren	Succeeded by Samuel B. Warren; William J. Street
Preceded by William J. Street; Dan Taylor	Member of the Connecticut House of Representatives from Norwalk; October 1818 – 1821; With: Moses Gregory, Andrew Hanford, Dan Taylor	Succeeded by Moses Gregory; James Quintard, Jr.
Preceded by Moses Gregory; James Quintard, Jr.	Member of the Connecticut House of Representatives from Norwalk; 1822–1823; With: Noah Wilcox	Succeeded by Moses Gregory; Noah Wilcox
Preceded by Moses Gregory; Noah Wilcox	Member of the Connecticut House of Representatives from Norwalk; 1824–1826; With: Thomas Reed, Moses Gregory	Succeeded by Thomas Reed; David Roberts
Preceded by Thomas Reed; David Roberts	Member of the Connecticut House of Representatives from Norwalk; 1827–1829; With: Samuel B. Warren, Moses Gregory	Succeeded by Charles W. Taylor; Clark Bissell
Preceded by Thomas B. Butler; John D. Lounsbury	Member of the Connecticut House of Representatives from Norwalk; 1834–1835; With: Samuel Comstock	Succeeded by Noah Wilcox; Charles W. Taylor
Preceded by Charles Hawley	Member of the Connecticut Senate from the 12th District; 1836–1837	Succeeded by Charles Hawley
