= 1855 Connecticut lieutenant gubernatorial election =

- April 4, 1855

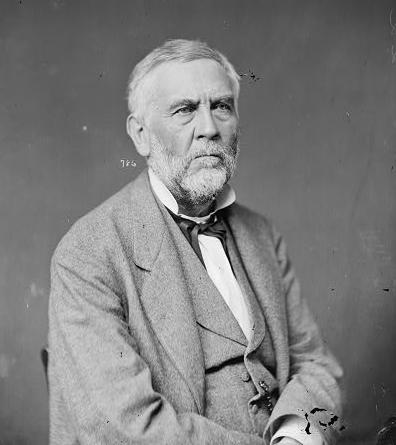

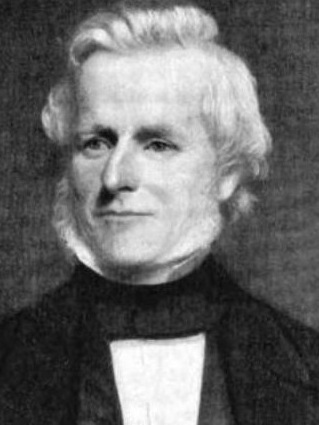
Nominee	William Field	John T. Wait	Alexander H. Holley
Party	Free Soil	Democratic	Republican
Popular vote	27,667	26,884	7,633
Percentage	42.80%	41.60%	11.80%
Lieutenant Governor before election
Alexander H. Holley
Whig
Elected Lieutenant Governor
William Field
Free Soil

The 1855 Connecticut lieutenant gubernatorial election was held on April 4, 1855, to elect the lieutenant governor of Connecticut. Free Soil nominee and former Connecticut State Comptroller William Field received a plurality of the votes against Democratic nominee John T. Wait and incumbent Republican lieutenant governor Alexander H. Holley. However, since no candidate received a majority in the popular vote, William Field was elected by the Connecticut General Assembly per the Connecticut Charter of 1662.

== General election ==
On election day, April 4, 1855, Free Soil nominee William Field won a plurality of the vote by a margin of 783 votes against his foremost opponent Democratic nominee John T. Wait. However, as no candidate received a majority of the vote, the election was forwarded to the Connecticut General Assembly, who elected William Field, thereby gaining Free Soil control over the office of lieutenant governor. Field was sworn in as the 46th lieutenant governor of Connecticut on May 2, 1855.

=== Results ===
Connecticut lieutenant gubernatorial election, 1855
Party	Candidate	Votes	%
Free Soil	William Field	27,667	42.80
Democratic	John T. Wait	26,884	41.60
Republican	Alexander H. Holley (incumbent)	7,633	11.80
	Scattering	2,081	3.80
Total votes		64,643	100.00
Free Soil gain from Whig			
