= Senator Dutton =

Senator Dutton may refer to:

- Henry Dutton (politician) (1796–1869), Connecticut State Senate
- Robert Dutton (politician) (born 1950), California State Senate
