= Charles Chapman (Connecticut politician) =

American politician (1799–1869)

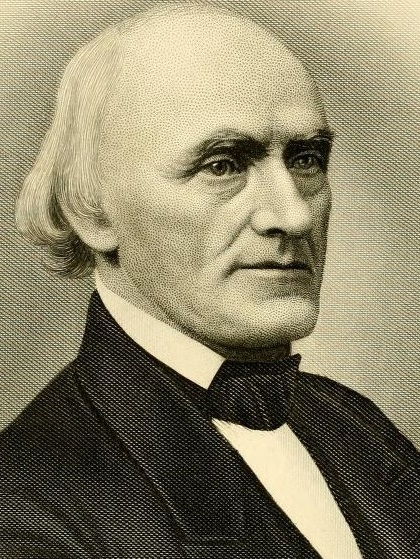

Member of the U.S. House of Representatives from Connecticut's 1st district
- In office March 4, 1851 – March 3, 1853
- Preceded by: Loren P. Waldo
- Succeeded by: James T. Pratt

United States Attorney for the District of Connecticut
- In office 1841–1844
- President: John Tyler
- Preceded by: William S. Holabird
- Succeeded by: Jonathan Stoadard

Member of the Connecticut House of Representatives
- In office 1864; 1862; 1847–1848; 1840

Personal details
- Born: June 21, 1799 Newtown, Connecticut, US
- Died: August 7, 1869 (aged 70)
- Party: Whig
- Education: Litchfield Law School

Charles Chapman (June 21, 1799 – August 7, 1869) was an American lawyer and politician who served a term as a U.S. representative from Connecticut.

Born in Newtown, Connecticut, Chapman studied at the Litchfield Law School, where his father, Asa Chapman, had also studied. He was admitted to the bar in 1820 and commenced practice in New Haven, Connecticut, in 1827. He moved to Hartford in 1832 and became editor of the New England Review.

Chapman served as a member of the Connecticut House of Representatives in 1840, 1847, and 1848, representing Hartford, and as United States Attorney for the District of Connecticut from 1841 to 1848.

A supporter of Andrew Jackson's successful campaign for President in 1827–28, Chapman subsequently became a Conservative and later a Whig. In 1848 he ran unsuccessfully for election to the Thirty-first Congress. He was elected as a Whig to the Thirty-second Congress (March 4, 1851 – March 3, 1853).

He was an unsuccessful candidate for governor of Connecticut as a Temperance candidate in 1854.

Chapman was again elected to the Connecticut House of Representatives in 1862 and 1864, as a Democrat.

Chapman was married to Sarah Tomlinson. He died in Hartford, Connecticut, on August 7, 1869, and was interred in Cedar Hill Cemetery.

His son Charles R. Chapman served as mayor of Hartford and in both houses of the Connecticut legislature.

U.S. House of Representatives
Preceded by Loren P. Waldo	Member of the U.S. House of Representatives from Connecticut's 1st congressional district 1851–1853	Succeeded by James T. Pratt
