= Joshua Beal Ferris =

American politician

Member of the Connecticut Senate from the 12th District
- In office 1840–1842
- Preceded by: Thomas B. Butler
- Succeeded by: Clark Bissell
- In office 1849–1851
- Preceded by: Thomas B. Butler
- Succeeded by: Charles Marvin

Member of the Connecticut House of Representatives from Stamford
- In office 1836–1839 Serving with Selleck Scofield
- Preceded by: Royal L. Gay, Selleck Scofield
- Succeeded by: Selleck Scofield, Samuel Lockwood

Personal details
- Born: January 13, 1804 Greenwich, Connecticut
- Died: June 8, 1886 (aged 82)
- Resting place: Stamford, Connecticut
- Party: Whig
- Spouse: Sally Ann Peters (m. 1823)
- Education: Yale College (1823)
- Occupation: Lawyer

Joshua Beal Ferris (January 13, 1804 – June 8, 1886) was a member of the Connecticut House of Representatives representing Stamford from 1838 to 1839, and a member of the Connecticut Senate representing Connecticut's 12th Senate District from 1840 to 1842, and from 1849 to 1851. In 1851, he was Senate President Pro Tempore.

He graduated from Yale College in 1823, and thereafter opened a preparatory school in Stamford, where he taught until 1833.

He was admitted to the bar in 1829, and began practicing law in Fairfield County in 1833. At one point he was partners with Calvin G. Child.

In the election of 1848, Ferris was elected a presidential elector for the Whig Party. He cast his vote for Zachary Taylor and Millard Fillmore for President and Vice President of the United States.

Connecticut State Senate
Preceded by Thomas B. Butler	Member of the Connecticut Senate from the 12th District; 1840–1842	Succeeded by Clark Bissell
Preceded by Thomas B. Butler	Member of the Connecticut Senate from the 12th District; 1849–1851	Succeeded by Charles Marvin
Connecticut House of Representatives
Preceded by Royal L. Gay, Selleck Scofield	Member of the Connecticut House of Representatives from Stamford; 1836–1839; With: Seth Classon, Selleck Scofield	Succeeded by Selleck Scofield, Samuel Lockwood
