= 1847 Connecticut gubernatorial election =

- April 5, 1847
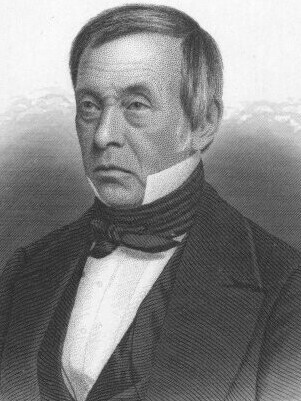

Nominee	Clark Bissell	Isaac Whittlesey
Party	Whig	Democratic
Popular vote	30,137	27,402
Percentage	50.54%	45.95%
- Bissell: 40–50% 50–60% 60–70% 70–80% Whittlesey: 40–50% 50–60% 60–70% Tie: 40–50%
Governor before election
Isaac Toucey
Democratic
Elected Governor
Clark Bissell
Whig

The 1847 Connecticut gubernatorial election was held on April 5, 1847. Former state legislator and Whig nominee Clark Bissell was elected, defeating Democratic nominee Isaac Whittlesey with 50.54% of the vote.

== General election ==
=== Candidates ===
Major party candidates

- Clark Bissell, Whig
- Isaac Whittlesey, Democratic

Minor party candidates

- Francis Gillette, Liberty

=== Results ===
1847 Connecticut gubernatorial election
Party	Candidate	Votes	%	±%
Whig	Clark Bissell	30,137	50.54%	
Democratic	Isaac Whittlesey	27,402	45.95%	
Liberty	Francis Gillette	2,094	3.51%	
Majority		2,735		
Turnout				
Whig gain from Democratic		Swing		
