= Clark Bissell =

American judge

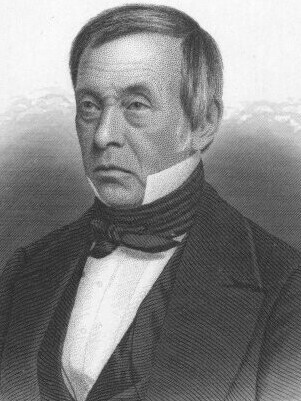

34th Governor of Connecticut
- In office May 5, 1847 – May 2, 1849
- Lieutenant: Charles J. McCurdy
- Preceded by: Isaac Toucey
- Succeeded by: Joseph Trumbull

Member of the Connecticut Senate from the 12th district
- In office 1842–1844
- Preceded by: Joshua Ferris
- Succeeded by: Darius Mead

Member of the Connecticut House of Representatives from Norwalk
- In office 1829–1830 Serving with Charles Wiley Taylor
- Preceded by: Benjamin Isaacs, Samuel B. Warren
- Succeeded by: Thaddeus Betts, Eli Bennett
- In office 1841–1842 Serving with Henry Selleck
- Preceded by: Algernon Beard, Joseph W. Hubbell
- Succeeded by: Henry Selleck, Matthew Wilcox
- In office 1850–1851 Serving with Algernon Beard
- Preceded by: Gould D. Jennings, William H. Benedict
- Succeeded by: Ebenezer Hill, Henry M. Prowitt

Personal details
- Born: September 7, 1782 Lebanon, Connecticut
- Died: September 15, 1857 (aged 75)
- Resting place: Union Cemetery, Norwalk, Connecticut
- Party: Whig
- Spouse: Sally Sherwood Bissell
- Children: 6
- Education: Yale College
- Profession: Lawyer, politician
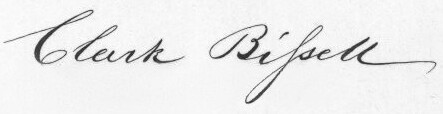
- Signature

Clark Bissell (September 7, 1782 – September 15, 1857) was the 34th governor of Connecticut. He served as an associate justice of the Connecticut Supreme Court from 1829 to 1839. He had previously served as a member of the Connecticut House of Representatives representing Norwalk and the Connecticut Senate representing the 12th District.

== Early life ==
Bissell was born in Lebanon, Connecticut on September 7, 1782. He studied at Yale College and graduated in 1806. He then studied law and was admitted to the bar in 1809. He married Sally Sherwood and they had six children.

== Career ==
Becoming a member of the Connecticut House of Representatives in 1829, Bissell was re-elected in 1841, and served in the Connecticut Senate from 1842 to 1843. He also succeeded Jeremiah G. Brainard as an associate judge of the Connecticut Supreme Court of Errors from 1829 to 1839.

=== Governor of Connecticut ===
Bissell ran unsuccessfully for the Connecticut governorship in 1846. However, he was elected in 1847 as Governor of Connecticut and was re-elected in 1848. During his term, he advocated for reform in education, taxes, and liquor prohibition, however, only insignificant legislation was passed. He vetoed a resolution on divorce, and it was looked upon as sabotaging the legislature's power. Because of this, he was not renominated for the 1849 election.

After completing his term as the Governor, Bissell continued as a professor of law at Yale University, a position he was appointed to during his governorship. He also served in the Connecticut House of Representatives in 1850.

== Death ==
Bissell died on September 15, 1857. He is interred at Norwalk Union Cemetery, Norwalk, Connecticut.

Party political offices
Preceded by Roger Sherman Baldwin	Whig nominee for Governor of Connecticut; 1846, 1847, 1848	Succeeded by Joseph Trumbull
Preceded by Benjamin Isaacs; Samuel B. Warren	Member of the Connecticut House of Representatives from Norwalk; 1829–1830; With: Charles W. Taylor	Succeeded by Thaddeus Betts; Eli Bennett
Preceded by Algernon Beard; Joseph W. Hubbell	Member of the Connecticut House of Representatives from Norwalk; 1841–1842; With: Henry Selleck	Succeeded by Henry Selleck; Matthew Wilcox
Preceded by Joshua Ferris	Member of the Connecticut Senate from the 12th district 1842–1844	Succeeded by Darius Mead
Preceded by Isaac Toucey	List of governors of Connecticut; 1847–1849	Succeeded by Joseph Trumbull
Preceded by Gould D. Jennings; William H. Benedict	Member of the Connecticut House of Representatives from Norwalk; 1850–1851; With: Algernon Beard	Succeeded by Ebenezer Hill; Henry M. Prowitt
