= 1854 Connecticut lieutenant gubernatorial election =

- April 5, 1854
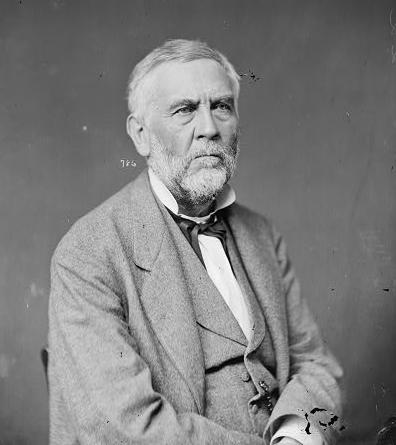

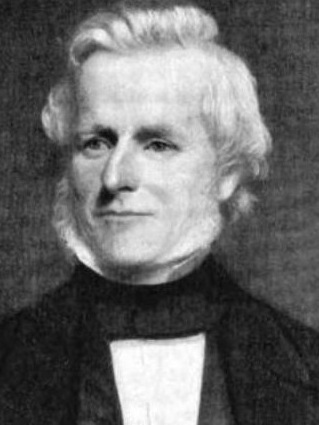

Nominee	John T. Wait	Alexander H. Holley	Erastus Lester
Party	Democratic	Whig	Free Soil
Popular vote	28,397	19,274	11,332
Percentage	45.80%	31.10%	18.30%
Lieutenant Governor before election
Vacant
Elected Lieutenant Governor
Alexander H. Holley
Whig

The 1854 Connecticut lieutenant gubernatorial election was held on April 5, 1854, to elect the lieutenant governor of Connecticut. Democratic nominee John T. Wait received a plurality of the votes against Whig nominee Alexander H. Holley and Free Soil nominee Erastus Lester. However, since no candidate received a majority in the popular vote, Alexander H. Holley was elected by the Connecticut General Assembly per the Connecticut Charter of 1662.

== General election ==
On election day, April 5, 1854, Democratic nominee John T. Wait won a plurality of the vote by a margin of 9,123 votes against his foremost opponent Whig nominee Alexander H. Holley. However, as no candidate received a majority of the vote, the election was forwarded to the Connecticut General Assembly, who elected Alexander H. Holley, thereby gaining Whig control over the office of lieutenant governor. Holley was sworn in as the 45th lieutenant governor of Connecticut on May 3, 1854.

=== Results ===
Connecticut lieutenant gubernatorial election, 1854
Party	Candidate	Votes	%
Whig	Alexander H. Holley	19,274	31.10
Democratic	John T. Wait	28,397	45.80
Free Soil	Erastus Lester	11,332	18.30
	Scattering	2,682	4.80
Total votes		61,974	100.00
Whig gain from Democratic			
