= William J. Street =

American politician (1784–1847)

William Jarvis Street

4th Warden of the Borough of Norwalk, Connecticut
- In office 1842–1845
- Preceded by: Joseph W. Hubbell
- Succeeded by: Stiles Curtis

Member of the Connecticut House of Representatives from Norwalk
- In office October 1817 – October 1818 Serving with Samuel B. Warren, Dan Taylor
- Preceded by: Benjamin Isaacs, Samuel B. Warren
- Succeeded by: Benjamin Isaacs, Dan Taylor

Personal details
- Born: June 16, 1784 Norwalk, Connecticut, U.S.
- Died: December 18, 1847 (aged 63) Norwalk, Connecticut, U.S.
- Resting place: Union Cemetery, Norwalk, Connecticut, U.S.
- Spouse(s): Hannah Street (m. November 08, 1807; d. 1811), Sarah Camp (m. November 28, 1813)
- Children: Susan Ann Street (b. 1808), Hannah Broughton Street (b. 1814), William C. Street, LeGrand Street (b. 1818), Mary Elizabeth Street Cholwell (b. 1822), Francis Gregory Street (b. 1826), Sarah Frances Street (b. 1832)
- Occupation: hardware merchant

Military service
- Rank: Captain
- Unit: Connecticut Militia
- Battles/wars: War of 1812

William Jarvis Street (June 16, 1784 – December 18, 1847) (also recorded as William I. Street) was a member of the Connecticut House of Representatives from Norwalk from 1817 to 1818. and a Warden of the Borough of Norwalk from 1842 to 1845.

He was the son of John Street, and Silvia Bessey. He was the father of William C. Street, who took over his father's hardware business, and also served as Warden of the Borough of Norwalk.

Preceded by Joseph W. Hubbell	Warden of the Borough of Norwalk, Connecticut; 1842–1845	Succeeded by Stiles Curtis
Connecticut House of Representatives
Preceded by Benjamin Isaacs; Samuel B. Warren	Member of the Connecticut House of Representatives from Norwalk; October 1817–October 1818; With: Samuel B. Warren, Dan Taylor	Succeeded by Benjamin Isaacs; Dan Taylor
