= 1853 Connecticut gubernatorial election =

- April 4, 1853
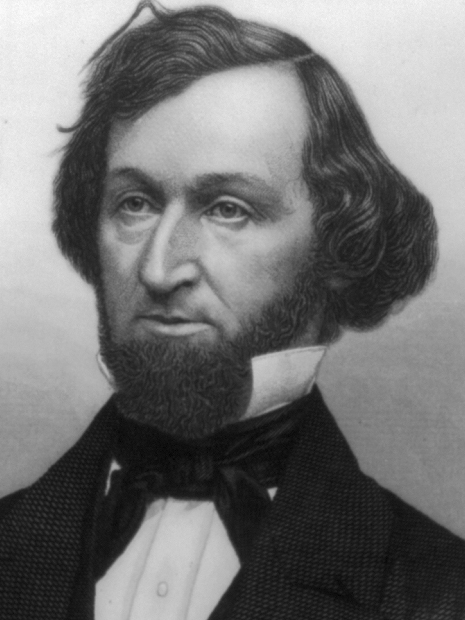

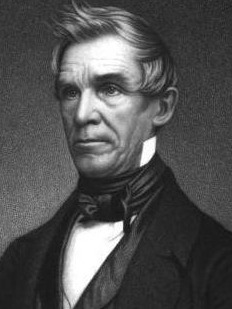

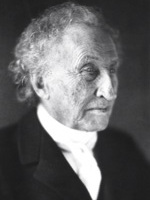
Nominee	Thomas H. Seymour	Henry Dutton	Francis Gillette
Party	Democratic	Whig	Free Soil
Popular vote	30,814	20,671	8,926
Percentage	51.01%	34.22%	14.78%
- Seymour: 30–40% 40–50% 50–60% 60–70% 70–80% Dutton: 40–50% 50–60% 60–70% Tie: 40–50% 50%
Governor before election
Thomas H. Seymour
Democratic
Elected Governor
Thomas H. Seymour
Democratic

The 1853 Connecticut gubernatorial election was held on April 4, 1853. Incumbent governor and Democratic Party nominee Thomas H. Seymour defeated former state legislator and Whig nominee Henry Dutton and former state legislator and Free Soil nominee Francis Gillette with 51.01% of the vote.

Seymour would resign on October 13, 1853, to become Minister to Russia, and Lieutenant Governor Charles H. Pond served as acting governor until the following May.

== General election ==
=== Candidates ===
Major party candidates

- Thomas H. Seymour, Democratic
- Henry Dutton, Whig

Minor party candidates

- Francis Gillette, Free Soil

=== Results ===
1853 Connecticut gubernatorial election
Party	Candidate	Votes	%	±%
Democratic	Thomas H. Seymour (incumbent)	30,814	51.01%	
Whig	Henry Dutton	20,671	34.22%	
Free Soil	Francis Gillette	8,926	14.78%	
Majority		10,143		
Turnout				
Democratic hold		Swing		
