= Thomas Wheeler Williams =

American politician

Thomas W. Williams

Member of the U.S. House of Representatives from Connecticut's 3rd district
- In office March 4, 1839 – March 3, 1843
- Preceded by: George S. Catlin
- Succeeded by: Chauncey F. Cleveland

Personal details
- Born: Thomas Wheeler Williams; September 28, 1789 Stonington, Connecticut, U.S.
- Died: December 31, 1874 (aged 85) New London, Connecticut, U.S
- Resting place: Cedar Grove Cemetery
- Party: Whig

Thomas Wheeler Williams (September 28, 1789 – December 31, 1874) was a U.S. representative from Connecticut from 1839 to 1843.

== Biography ==
Born in Stonington, Connecticut, Williams attended the public schools. At the age of fifteen, he was employed as a clerk in New York City, and before he was twenty-one was employed on a business mission to Norway, Sweden, and Russia. For about eight years, he was engaged in the shipping business. He moved to New London, Connecticut, in 1818 and became a prominent figure in the whaling business.

=== Congress ===
Williams was elected as a Whig to the Twenty-sixth and Twenty-seventh Congresses (March 4, 1839 – March 3, 1843). He served as chairman of the Committee on Mileage (Twenty-sixth and Twenty-seventh Congresses).

=== Later career ===
He served as member of the State house of representatives in 1846 and 1847. He served as president of the New London, Willamantic and Palmer Railroad (later the New London Northern Railroad) in 1847 and for many years thereafter.

=== Death and burial ===
He died in New London, Connecticut, December 31, 1874. He was interred in Cedar Grove Cemetery.

U.S. House of Representatives
Preceded by Elisha Haley	Member of the U.S. House of Representatives from Connecticut's 3rd congressional district 1839–1843	Succeeded by George S. Catlin
