= Charles R. Chapman =

American politician (1827–1897)

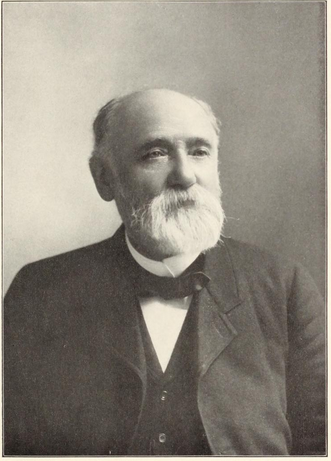

Mayor of Hartford, Connecticut
- In office 1866–1872

Member of the Connecticut House of Representatives
- In office 1856, 1872

Member of the Connecticut State Senate
- In office 1857
- Constituency: First District

Personal details
- Born: Charles Richard Chapman; November 23, 1827 New Haven, Connecticut
- Died: January 25, 1897 (aged 69) Hartford, Connecticut
- Party: Democratic
- Spouse: Harriet Putnam Thomas (m. 1855)
- Parents: Charles Chapman (father); Sarah Tomlinson (mother)
- Education: Trinity College

Charles Richard Chapman (November 23, 1827 – January 25, 1897) was an American lawyer and politician who was Mayor of Hartford, Connecticut, and served in both houses of the Connecticut legislature.

== Early life ==
Chapman was born in New Haven, Connecticut, to Charles Chapman and Sarah Tomlinson. In 1829 he moved to Hartford with his family, where he continued to reside until his death. He graduated from Trinity College in 1847, studied law for a year in Northampton, Massachusetts, and completed his legal studies in Now York in the office of John Van Buren, son of President Martin Van Buren.

== Career ==
A Democrat, in 1856, he became a member of the Connecticut House of Representatives. In 1857 he became a member of the State senate representing the first senatorial district. He was mayor of the city of Hartford from 1866 to 1872. In 1872 he was again a member of the House of Representatives. He was city attorney of the city of Hartford and postmaster from June 1885 to March 1890.

== Personal life ==
On May 1, 1855, Chapman married Mrs. Harriet Putnam Thomas.

== Death ==
Chapman died at his home in Hartford on January 25, 1897, and is interred at Cedar Hill Cemetery.
