= John A. Rockwell =

American politician (1803–1861)

Member of the U.S. House of Representatives from Connecticut's 3rd district
- In office March 4, 1845 – March 3, 1849
- Preceded by: George S. Catlin
- Succeeded by: Chauncey F. Cleveland

Personal details
- Born: John Arnold Rockwell; August 27, 1803 Norwich, Connecticut, U.S.
- Died: February 10, 1861 (aged 57) Washington, D.C., U.S
- Party: Whig
- Education: Yale College

John Arnold Rockwell (August 27, 1803 in Norwich, Connecticut – February 10, 1861 in Washington, D.C.) was a U.S. representative from Connecticut.

Rockwell attended the common schools. He graduated from Yale College in 1822, studied law, and was admitted to the bar and practiced in Norwich. Rockwell served as member of the State senate in 1839. He served as judge of the county court.

He was elected as a Whig to the Twenty-ninth Congress defeating Rep. George S. Catlin and Thirtieth Congress defeating Lieutenant Governor Noyes Billings serving (March 4, 1845 – March 3, 1849). He served as chairman of the Committee on Claims (Thirtieth Congress), but was an unsuccessful candidate for reelection in 1849 to the Thirty-first Congress, losing to Chauncey F. Cleveland. He engaged in the practice of law before the court of claims of the United States at Washington, D.C., and joined in the call for the Constitutional Union Party Convention in May 1860 where he was a delegate for Connecticut and appointed to the National Committee. He was interred in Yantic Cemetery, Norwich, Connecticut.

Party political offices
Preceded by Henry Dutton	Whig nominee for Governor of Connecticut; 1856	Succeeded by None
U.S. House of Representatives
Preceded by George S. Catlin	Member of the U.S. House of Representatives from Connecticut's 3rd congressional district 1845–1849	Succeeded by Chauncey Fitch Cleveland
