= Charles Marvin (Connecticut politician) =

American politician (1804–1883)

Member of the Connecticut Senate from the 12th District
- In office 1846–1848
- Preceded by: Darius Mead
- Succeeded by: Thomas B. Butler
- In office 1851–1852
- Preceded by: Joshua Ferris
- Succeeded by: Thomas B. Butler

Member of the Connecticut House of Representatives
- In office 1836–1837
- Preceded by: James F. Chapman
- Succeeded by: Isaac M. Sturgess, II
- In office 1838–1839
- Preceded by: Isaac M. Sturgess, II
- Succeeded by: Abijah Betts

Personal details
- Born: 1804
- Died: December 1, 1883 Wilton, Connecticut
- Party: Whig
- Occupation: farmer

Charles Marvin (1804 – December 1, 1883) was a member of the Connecticut Senate representing the 12th district from 1846 to 1848 and from 1851 to 1852 and a member of the Connecticut House of Representatives in the sessions of 1836 and 1838.

He graduated from Yale College in 1823. After leaving College he began to read law, but from trouble with his eyes was led to engage in farming in his native town, which occupation he afterwards adopted. He became a deacon in the Congregational church of his native town in 1841, and was through life earnestly interested in that church's welfare. In 1846, and again in 1847, and in 1851, he was chosen to the State Senate, and thus became ex officio in the two latter terms a member of the Corporation of Yale College. In 1848 he represented Wilton, Connecticut in the House, and in 1852 was appointed bank commissioner. He had already been for many years one of the directors of the Fairfield County Bank. He died at his ancestral home in Wilton, Conn., December 1, 1883, in his 81st year, after a protracted illness.

In November, 1836, he married Clarina, third daughter of the Rev. Samuel Merwin, then of Wilton, who survived him, with three daughters and two sons.

This article incorporates public domain material from the 1884 Yale Obituary Record.

Connecticut State Senate
Preceded by Darius Mead	Member of the Connecticut Senate from the 12th District; 1846–1848	Succeeded by Thomas B. Butler
Preceded by Joshua Ferris	Member of the Connecticut Senate from the 12th District; 1851–1852	Succeeded by Thomas B. Butler
Connecticut House of Representatives
Preceded by James F. Chapman	Member of the Connecticut House of Representatives from Wilton; 1836–1837	Succeeded by Isaac M. Sturgess, II
Preceded by Isaac M. Sturgess, II	Member of the Connecticut House of Representatives from Wilton; 1838–1839	Succeeded by Abijah Betts
