= Loren P. Waldo =

American politician (1802–1881)

Loren Waldo
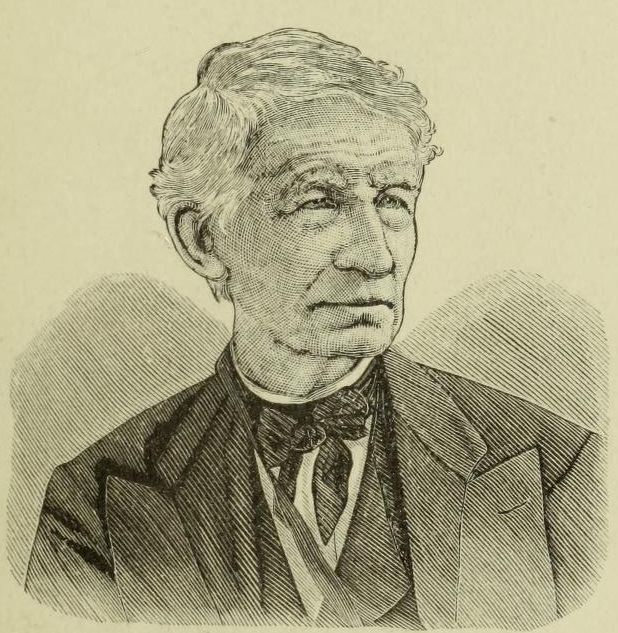
- Loren P. Waldo (Connecticut Congressman)

Member of the U.S. House of Representatives from Connecticut's 1st district
- In office March 4, 1849 – March 3, 1851
- Preceded by: James Dixon
- Succeeded by: Charles Chapman

Personal details
- Born: Loren Pinckney Waldo; February 2, 1802 Canterbury, Connecticut, U.S.
- Died: September 8, 1881 (aged 79) Hartford, Connecticut, U.S.
- Resting place: Cedar Hill Cemetery
- Party: Democratic

Loren Pinckney Waldo (February 2, 1802 – September 8, 1881) was an American politician from Connecticut who served as a Democratic member of the United States House of Representatives from Connecticut.

Waldo was born in Canterbury, Connecticut, and attended the common schools. He became a teacher and engaged in agricultural pursuits. In 1823, he moved to Tolland, Connecticut, and studied law. He was admitted to the bar in 1825 and commenced practice in Somers, Connecticut.

He served as postmaster in Somers from 1829 to 1830 and as one of the superintendents of schools. He returned to Tolland in 1830. He served as member of the State house of representatives 1832–1834 and in 1839. He served as clerk of the State house of representatives in 1833 and as State's attorney from 1837 to 1849. He served as judge of probate for Tolland district in 1842 and 1843. He served as member in 1847 of the committee to revise the statutes. He was a member of the State house of representatives in 1847 and 1848.

Waldo was elected as a Democrat to the Thirty-first Congress (March 4, 1849 – March 3, 1851). He served as chairman of the Committee on Revolutionary Pensions (Thirty-first Congress). He was an unsuccessful candidate for reelection in 1850 to the Thirty-second Congress. He served as commissioner of the school fund of Connecticut. He served as Commissioner of Pensions under President Franklin Pierce from March 17, 1853, until January 10, 1856, when he resigned to become judge of the superior court of Connecticut 1856–1863. He moved to Hartford, Connecticut, and resumed the practice of his profession. He was again a member of a committee to revise the statutes, in 1864.

He died in Hartford on September 8, 1881, and was interred in Cedar Hill Cemetery.

== Bibliography ==
- The Early History of Tolland: An Address Delivered Before the Tolland County Historical Society, Press of Case, Lockwood & Company, Hartford, 1861

== Footnotes ==
U.S. House of Representatives
Preceded by James Dixon	Member of the U.S. House of Representatives from Connecticut's 1st congressional district March 4, 1849 – March 3, 1851	Succeeded by Charles Chapman
