= 1855 Texas lieutenant gubernatorial election =

- August 6, 1855
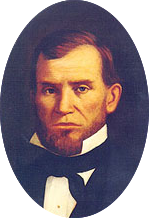

Nominee	Hardin Richard Runnels	W. G. W. Jowers	Andrew Neill
Party	Democratic	American	Democratic
Popular vote	21,073	17,817	4,360
Percentage	48.7%	41.2%	10.1%
Lieutenant Governor before election
David Catchings Dickson
Democratic
Elected Lieutenant Governor
Hardin Richard Runnels
Democratic

The 1855 Texas lieutenant gubernatorial election was held on August 6, 1855, in order to elect the lieutenant governor of Texas. The Democratic candidate, Speaker of the Texas House Hardin Richard Runnels defeated the American Party candidate, state senator William Jowers becoming the fifth lieutenant governor of the state.

Runnels was the third consecutive lieutenant governor who had previously served as Speaker of the Texas House of Representatives.

== Background ==
Since the 1848 presidential election, the Democratic Party had become the most prominent political organization in the state. The Texas Whig Party which had also set up a presence in the state during the previous two presidential campaigns had essentially fizzled out from lack of support. Leading up to this campaign, even though the Democrats were essentially the only party in the state it lacked a particularly organized nominating apparatus and even if candidates did identify with a political party, they often ran independent campaigns. In April 1855, the Democratic Party leadership attempted to organize a convention to nominate candidates for governor and lieutenant governor, but only delegates from twelve counties were able to attend. Given the small number of delegates, the convention refused to make official nominations, but did "respectuflly suggest the reelection of the present incumbents".

Starting in 1854, the Native American Party, a nativist party based on anti-catholic and anti-immigrant sentiments, saw a sudden wave of political successes. The members of the party were known as the "Know Nothings" due to semi-secret nature of the organization. While the movement was concentrated, in the North East, they had been some growth in the state and in San Antonio and Galveston saw members of the party be elected on the municipal level. A main factor of the Know Nothings' rhetoric in the state was the growing number of German immigrants and their increasing political and cultural influence. The leaders of the Texas Know Nothings saw an opportunity to build on their momentum and take control of the state from the Democratic Party, by secretly converting Democratic leadership to their cause. In a surprise convention in June 1855, they announced a full slate of candidates for congressional and statewide tickets. Leading this ticket was the incumbent lieutenant governor, David Catchings Dickson, who had secretly joined the party to challenge the incumbent governor Elisha M. Pease. For lieutenant governor, they selected state senator William Jowers as their candidate.

The Democratic party was shocked by the Dickson's party swap as they had already published newspapers urging voters to support him for lieutenant governor. A "Bomb Shell" convention was quickly assembled which declared the Know Nothings Party as "an enemy of the government" and denounced anyone who was a member of a secret political faction. This convention reiterated its support for Pease in the governor's race and dropped all support for Dickson. Eventually the party coalesced around Hardin Richard Runnels, the long serving state representative who had been selected as Speaker of the House during the previous legislature, as their candidate for lieutenant governor.

== General election ==
On election day, Runnels won the election with almost 49% of the vote, helping maintaining the Democratic Party's control on the state government. Most of the Know Nothing support was concentrated in Central Texas near Travis County. The legislature certified the election results on November 7, 1855, and Runnels was sworn into office on December 21, 1855.

=== Candidates ===
- William George Washington "W. G. W." Jowers, doctor, state senator, former state representative, veteran of the Army of the Republic of Texas, former member of the Mississippi House of Representatives (American)
- Andrew Neill, lawyer, militia leader, former probate judge in Mississippi (Democrat)
- Hardin Richard Runnels, Speaker of the Texas House of Representatives, plantation owner (Democrat)

=== Results ===
Texas lieutenant gubernatorial election, 1855
Party	Candidate	Votes	%
Democratic	Hardin Richard Runnels	21,073	48.72
Know Nothing	W. G. W. Jowers	17,817	41.20
Democratic	Andrew Neill	4,360	10.08
Total votes		43,250	100.00
Democratic hold			
