= Thomas B. Butler =

American judge (1806–1873)

Thomas Belden Butler
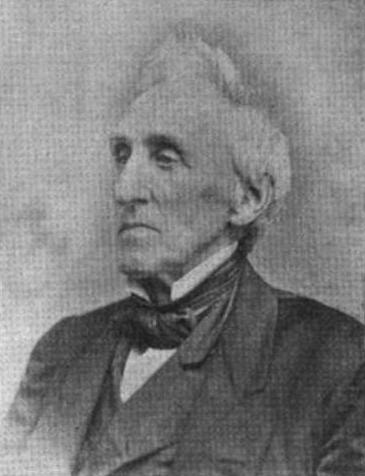

Chief Justice of the Connecticut Supreme Court
- In office 1870–1873
- Preceded by: William L. Storrs
- Succeeded by: Origen S. Seymour

Associate Justice of the Connecticut Supreme Court
- In office 1861–1873
- Succeeded by: James Phelps

Member of the United States House of Representatives from Connecticut's 4th congressional district
- In office March 4, 1849 – March 3, 1851
- Preceded by: Truman Smith
- Succeeded by: Origen S. Seymour

Member of the Connecticut Senate from the 12th district
- In office 1838–1840
- Preceded by: Charles Hawley
- Succeeded by: Joshua Ferris
- In office 1848–1849
- Preceded by: Charles Marvin
- Succeeded by: Joshua Ferris

Member of the Connecticut House of Representatives from Norwalk
- In office 1832–1834 Serving with John Loundsbury
- Preceded by: Eli Bennett, David Roberts
- Succeeded by: Samuel Comstock, Benjamin Isaacs
- In office 1837–1838 Serving with Lewis Gregory
- Preceded by: Noah Wilcox, Lewis Gregory
- Succeeded by: Lewis Gregory, Timothy Merwin
- In office 1843–1844 Serving with Matthew Wilcox
- Preceded by: Henry Selleck, Matthew Wilcox
- Succeeded by: Algernon Beard, Charles Thomas
- In office 1846–1847 Serving with William S. Lockwood
- Preceded by: Algernon Beard, William S. Lockwood
- Succeeded by: Samuel Jarvis, Asa Hill

Personal details
- Born: August 22, 1806 Wethersfield, Connecticut
- Died: June 8, 1873 (aged 66) Norwalk, Connecticut
- Resting place: Union Cemetery; Norwalk, Connecticut
- Party: Whig Party
- Education: Yale University (Medicine, 1828)
- Occupation: physician, lawyer

Thomas Belden Butler (August 22, 1806 – June 8, 1873) was a Whig politician from Connecticut. He was Chief Justice of the Connecticut Supreme Court from 1870 to 1873. He was a member of the United States House of Representatives from Connecticut's 4th congressional district from 1849 to 1851. He had previously served as a member of the Connecticut Senate representing the 12th District from 1847 to 1848. In 1848, he was President pro tempore of the Connecticut Senate. He also had served as a member of the Connecticut House of Representatives from 1832 to 1834, from 1837 to 1838, from 1843 to 1844, and from 1846 to 1847.

== Early life ==
Butler was born in Wethersfield, Connecticut, the son of Frederick Butler and Mary Belden. He attended the common schools. He was graduated from the medical department of Yale University in 1828 and commenced practice in Norwalk, Connecticut. Later, he studied law. He was admitted to the bar in 1837 and commenced practice in Norwalk.

== Political career ==
He served as member of the Connecticut House of Representatives from 1832 to 1846.

He served in the Connecticut Senate in 1847 and 1848.

Butler was elected as a Whig to the Thirty-first Congress (March 4, 1849 – March 3, 1851). He was an unsuccessful candidate for reelection in 1850 to the Thirty-second Congress.

He served as judge of the superior court in 1855.He was appointed associate justice of the State supreme court in 1861 and became chief justice of the same court in 1870.

He died in Norwalk, Connecticut, June 8, 1873. He was interred in Union Cemetery in Norwalk.

== Writing ==
Butler was the author of The Philosophy of the Weather (1856) and The Atmospheric System Developed : a Weather Book for Practical Men (1870).

Political offices
Preceded by Eli Bennett; David Roberts	Member of the Connecticut House of Representatives from Norwalk; 1832–1834; With: John D. Lounsbury	Succeeded by Samuel Comstock; Benjamin Isaacs
Preceded by Noah Wilcox; Lewis Gregory	Member of the Connecticut House of Representatives from Norwalk; 1837–1838; With: Lewis Gregory	Succeeded by Lewis Gregory; Timothy Merwin
Preceded by Charles Hawley	Member of the Connecticut Senate from the 12th district 1838–1840	Succeeded by Joshua Ferris
Preceded by Henry Selleck; Matthew Wilcox	Member of the Connecticut House of Representatives from Norwalk; 1843–1844; With: Matthew Wilcox	Succeeded by Algernon Beard; Charles Thomas
Preceded by Algernon Beard; William S. Lockwood	Member of the Connecticut House of Representatives from Norwalk; 1846–1847; With: William S. Lockwood	Succeeded by Samuel Jarvis; Asa Hill
Preceded by Charles Marvin	Member of the Connecticut Senate from the 12th district 1848–1849	Succeeded by Joshua Ferris
U.S. House of Representatives
Preceded by Truman Smith	Member of the U.S. House of Representatives from Connecticut's 4th congressional district March 4, 1849 – March 3, 1851	Succeeded by Origen S. Seymour
Political offices
Preceded by.	Associate Justice of the Connecticut Supreme Court; 1861–1873	Succeeded by James Phelps
Preceded by William L. Storrs	Chief Justice of the Connecticut Supreme Court; 1870–1873	Succeeded by Origen S. Seymour
