= Darius Mead =

American politician

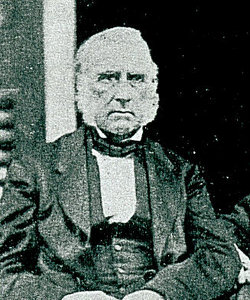

Member of the Connecticut Senate from the 12th District
- In office 1844–1846
- Preceded by: Clark Bissell
- Succeeded by: Charles Marvin

Personal details
- Born: July 9, 1787 Greenwich, Connecticut
- Died: January 28, 1864 (aged 76) Greenwich, Connecticut
- Education: Yale College (1807)

Darius Mead (July 9, 1787– January 28, 1864) was a member of the Connecticut Senate representing the 12th District from 1844 to 1846.

Mead was the son of Joshua and Rachel (Knapp) Mead, of Round Hill, Greenwich, Conn., was born in that town, July 9, 1787. He was fitted for College under the tuition of Rev. I. Lewis, D.D. he graduated from Yale College in 1807.

After pursuing a course of study under Dr. Benjamin Rush, in Philadelphia, he received a medical diploma in 1809. He practiced medicine for a few months in New York City, but returned to his native town in 1810 and there continued to reside, still engaged in practice.

In 1845 and 1846, he represented the 12th Senatorial District in the Senate of Connecticut, being nominated without his knowledge of the intentions of his fellow-citizens. For one year he was a member of the Corporation of Yale College.

His death occurred in Greenwich, January 28, 1864. A funeral sermon, by Rev S. B. S. Bissell, of Norwalk, Connecticut was published. (N. Y, 1864, 8vo. 19 pp )

Dr. Mead was married in 1809, to Lydia K, daughter of Elisha Belcher, M. D, of Round Hill, who died in 1848.

This article incorporates public domain material from the Yale Obituary Record.

Connecticut State Senate
Preceded by Clark Bissell	Member of the Connecticut Senate from the 12th District; 1844–1846	Succeeded by Charles Marvin
