= George S. Catlin =

American politician

Member of the U.S. House of Representatives from Connecticut's 3rd district
- In office March 4, 1843 – March 3, 1845
- Preceded by: Thomas Wheeler Williams
- Succeeded by: John A. Rockwell

Personal details
- Born: George Smith Catlin; August 24, 1808 Harwinton, Connecticut, U.S.
- Died: December 26, 1851 (aged 43) Windham, Connecticut, U.S.
- Party: Democratic

George Smith Catlin (August 24, 1808 – December 26, 1851) was a U.S. representative from Connecticut.

Born in Harwinton, Connecticut, Catlin attended the common schools, Amherst College, and Litchfield Law School. He was admitted to the bar in 1828 and practiced in Windham, Connecticut, from 1829 to 1851. He served as member of the Connecticut House of Representatives in 1831 and again in 1846, and was also secretary to the Governor from 1831 to 1833. From 1842 to 1843, he served as prosecuting attorney for Windham County.

Catlin was elected as a Democrat to the Twenty-eighth Congress (March 4, 1843 – March 3, 1845). He was an unsuccessful Democratic candidate for Governor of Connecticut in 1848, but served in the Connecticut State Senate in 1850, and as judge of the Windham County Court in 1850 and 1851.

He died in Windham, Connecticut, on December 26, 1851, and was interred in Windham Cemetery.

Party political offices
Preceded by Isaac Whittlesey	Democratic nominee for Governor of Connecticut; 1848	Succeeded by Thomas H. Seymour
U.S. House of Representatives
Preceded by Thomas Wheeler Williams	Member of the U.S. House of Representatives from Connecticut's 3rd congressional district 1843–1845	Succeeded by John A. Rockwell
