= 1856 Ecuadorian presidential election =

- 1856
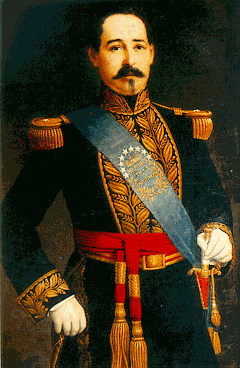
Nominee	Francisco Robles	Manuel Gómez de la Torre
Electoral vote	514	292
Percentage	59.70%	33.91%
President before election
José María Urvina
Elected President
Francisco Robles

Presidential elections were held in Ecuador in 1856. The elections were held using an electoral college, and resulted in a victory for Francisco Robles, who received 60% of the vote. He took office on 1 September.

== Results ==
Candidate	Votes	%
Francisco Robles	514	59.70
Manuel Gómez de la Torre	292	33.91
Manuel Bustamante del Mazo	37	4.30
Francisco Aguirre Abad	9	1.05
Other candidates	9	1.05
Total	861	100.00
Valid votes	861	98.74
Invalid/blank votes	11	1.26
Total votes	872	100.00
Source: Cevallos
