= 1855 Georgia gubernatorial election =

- October 1, 1855
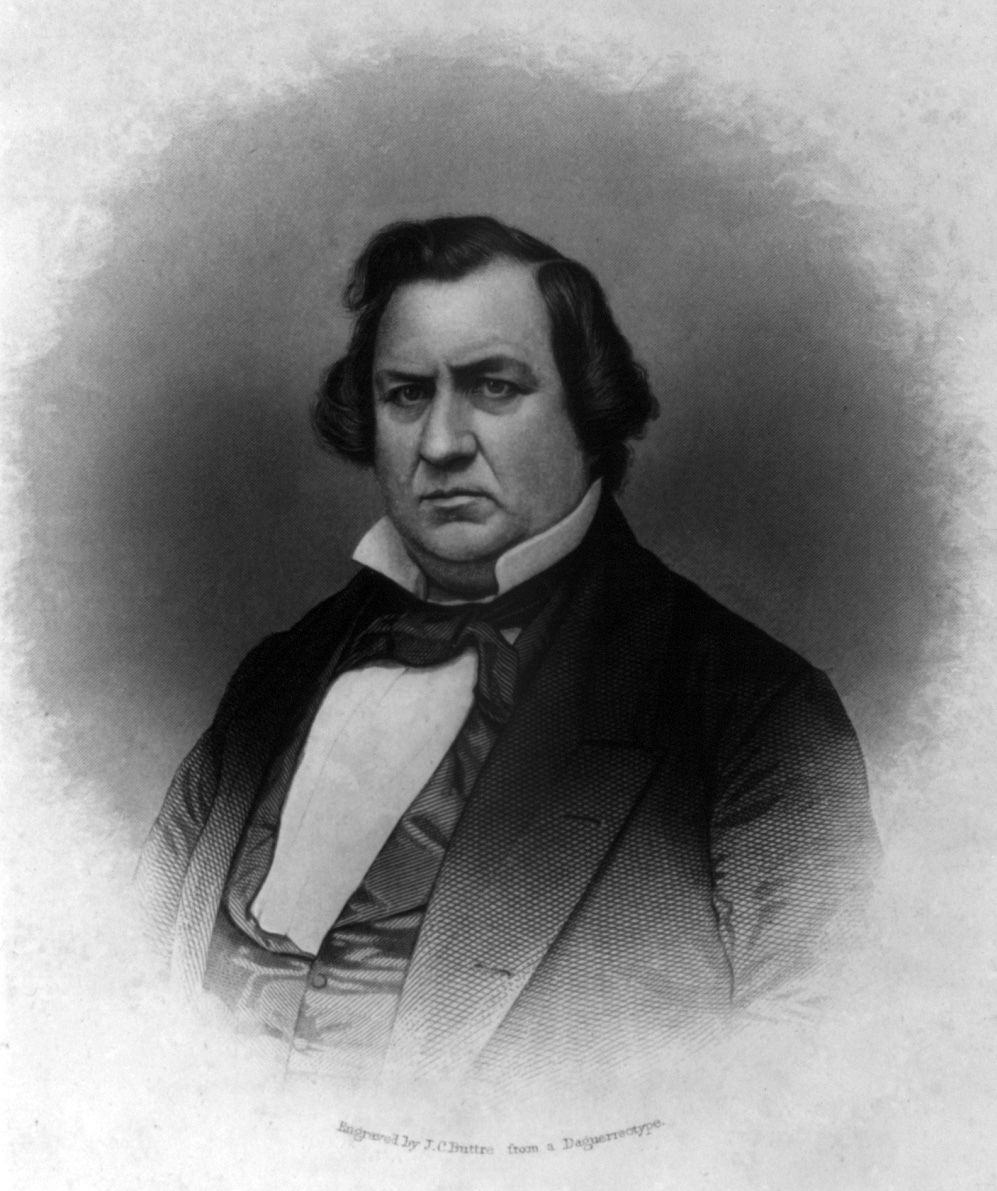

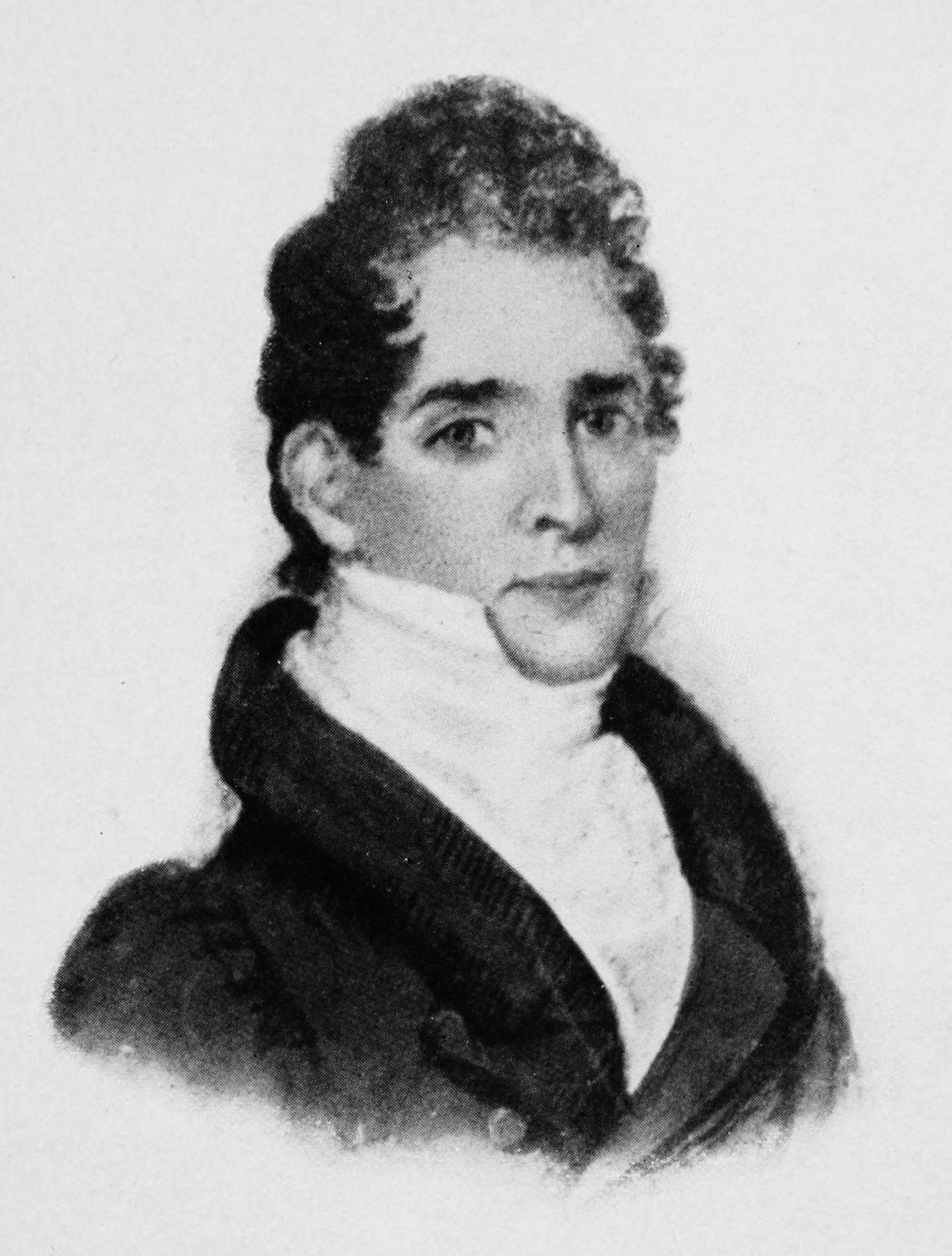

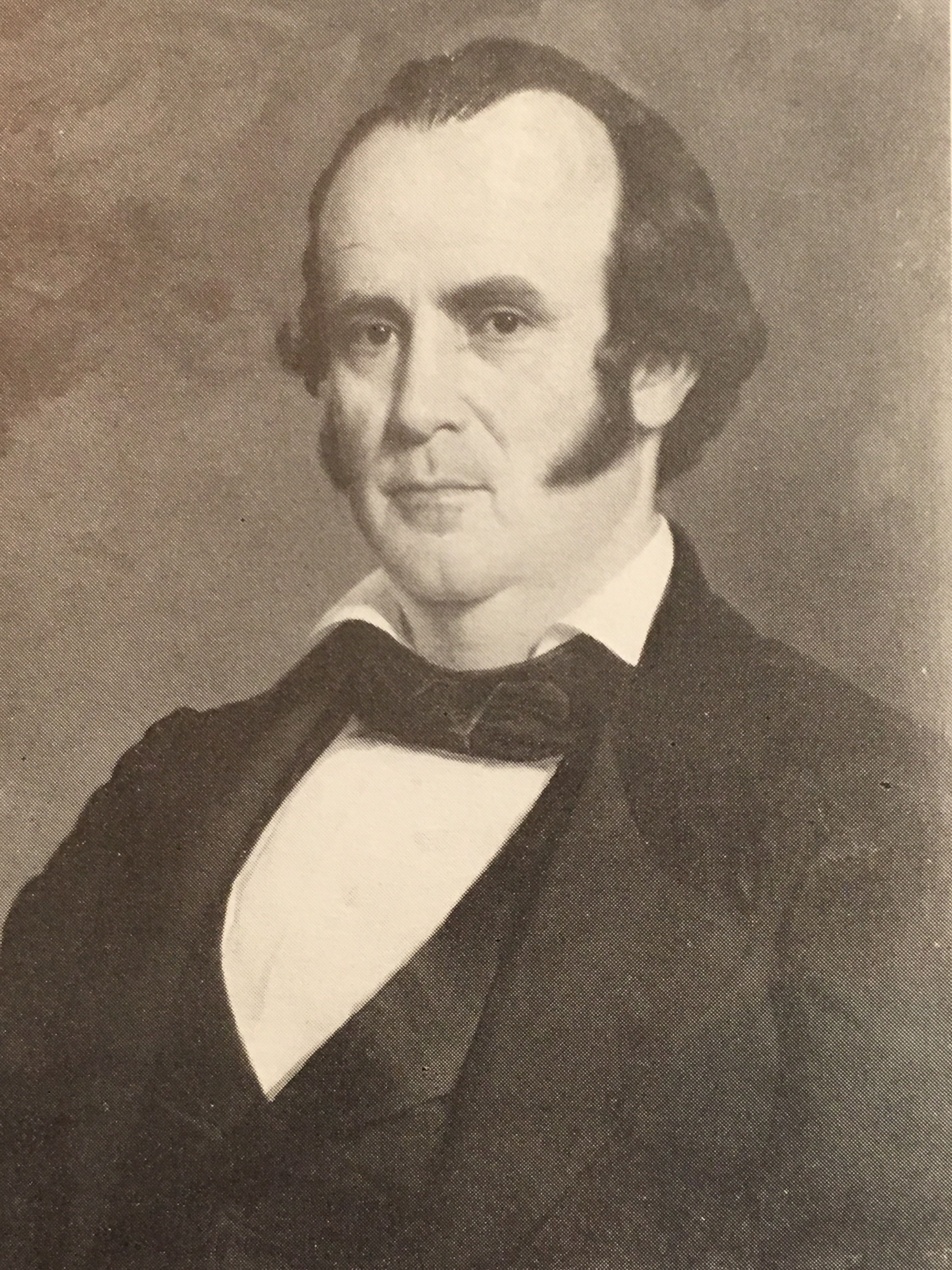
Nominee	Herschel V. Johnson	Garnett Andrews	B. H. Overby
Party	Democratic	Know Nothing	Temperance
Popular vote	54,136	43,358	6,331
Percentage	52.14%	41.76%	6.10%
- Results by County; Johnson: 40–50% 50–60% 60–70% 70–80% 80–90% Andrews: 40–50% 50–60% 60–70% 70–80% 80–90%
Governor before election
Herschel V. Johnson
Democratic
Elected Governor
Herschel V. Johnson
Democratic

The 1855 Georgia gubernatorial election was held on October 1, 1855, in order to elect the Governor of Georgia. Democratic nominee and incumbent Governor Herschel V. Johnson was re-elected against Know Nothing (Sam) nominee Garnett Andrews and Temperance nominee B. H. Overby.

== Background ==
By this point, the Constitutional Union Party had effectively dissolved with the loss of Union Democrats, and with the collapse of the Whigs following the passage of the Kansas–Nebraska Act in 1854, most Southern Whigs had joined the nativist American Party (Know Nothing). In Georgia the Know Nothing Party was called "Sam" by the local Democratic party. Its use was so widespread that even some Know-Nothings adopted it. According to Royce McCrary, the origins of the term are obscure. Sam was a term applied to the raw Irish immigrants in the 1850s. Apparently the Democrats, in a mocking way, meant to imply that the anti-Irish Know-Nothings were actually Irish. As one of these people, Garnett Andrews became involved with the Nothing Know party and in 1855, after resigning his seat on the Northern Circuit, became the Know-Nothing candidate for the Georgia governorship. He campaigned against unrestricted immigration and against secession.

Around the same time, the Georgia State Temperance Convention met in Atlanta with the aim of getting involved in local politics. Basil Hallam Overby, a lawyer from Atlanta, beat out the son of William H. Crawford for the nomination.

== General election ==
On election day, October 1, 1855, Democratic nominee Herschel V. Johnson won re-election by a margin of 10,778 votes against his foremost opponent Know Nothing (Sam) (Note: In Georgia the Know Nothing Party was called "Sam" by the local Democratic party. Its use was so widespread that even some Know-Nothings adopted it. According to Royce McCrary, the origins of the term are obscure. Sam was a term applied to the raw Irish immigrants in the 1850s. Apparently the Democrats, in a mocking way, meant to imply that the anti-Irish Know-Nothings were actually Irish.) nominee Garnett Andrews, thereby continuing Democratic control over the office of Governor. Johnson was sworn in for his second term on November 9, 1855.

=== Results ===
Georgia gubernatorial election, 1855
Party	Candidate	Votes	%
Democratic	Herschel V. Johnson (incumbent)	54,136	52.14
Know Nothing	Garnett Andrews	43,358	41.76
Temperance	B. H. Overby	6,331	6.10
Total votes		103,825	100
