= American Party =

American Party may refer to:

== Political parties in the United States ==
- Toleration Party, also known as the American Party, established in Connecticut to oppose the Federalist Party
- Native American Party, known as the American Party after 1855, an American nativist political party
- American Party (1904), an anti-Mormon party that existed in Utah from 1904 to 1911
- A party established in 1909 to put the Iowa-based United Christian Party (United States) into new organizational form
- American Party (1914), a party organized by ex-governor of New York William Sulzer
- American Party (1919), a short-lived political party in Texas operated for the benefit of James E. Ferguson
- American Party (1924), which ran Gilbert Nations for President of the United States
- American Party of the United States, a successor of the 1968 American Independent Party

== See also ==
- America Party, a political party proposed by Elon Musk in 2025
- American Independent Party
- American Republican Party (1843)
- Independence Party of America
- Independent American Party of Nevada
- Alliance Party of South Carolina, formerly American Party of South Carolina, a minor centrist party
- Citizens Party of the United States, formerly known as the New American Independent Party
