= 1855 Connecticut gubernatorial election =

- April 2, 1855
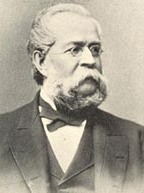

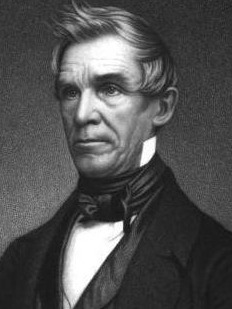
Nominee	William T. Minor	Samuel Ingham	Henry Dutton
Party	Know Nothing	Democratic	Whig
Electoral vote	117	70
Popular vote	28,080	27,292	9,162
Percentage	43.51%	42.29%	14.20%
- Minor: 30–40% 40–50% 50–60% 60–70% 70–80% Ingham: 30–40% 40–50% 50–60% 60–70% 70–80% Dutton: 40–50%
Governor before election
Henry Dutton
Whig
Elected Governor
William T. Minor
Know Nothing

The 1855 Connecticut gubernatorial election was held on April 2, 1855. Former state legislator and American Party nominee William T. Minor defeated former congressman and Democratic nominee Samuel Ingham and incumbent governor and Whig nominee Henry Dutton with 43.51% of the vote.

The results reflected the national transition from the Second Party System to the Third Party System. The Know Nothings would win the first of two such elections, and the incumbent Whig Party's vote share collapsed, with Dutton finishing a distant third.

Although Minor won a plurality of the vote, he did not receive a majority. As a result, the Connecticut General Assembly elected the governor, per the state constitution. Minor won the vote over Ingham, 117 to 70, in the General Assembly, and became the governor.

== General election ==
=== Candidates ===
Major party candidates

- William T. Minor, American or Know Nothing
- Samuel Ingham, Democratic
- Henry Dutton, Whig

=== Results ===
1855 Connecticut gubernatorial election
Party	Candidate	Votes	%	±%
Know Nothing	William T. Minor	28,080	43.51%	
Democratic	Samuel Ingham	27,292	42.29%	
Whig	Henry Dutton (incumbent)	9,162	14.20%	
Plurality		788		
Turnout				

1855 Connecticut gubernatorial election, contingent General Assembly election
Party	Candidate	Votes	%	±%
Know Nothing	William T. Minor	117	62.57%	
Democratic	Samuel Ingham	70	37.43%	
Majority		47		
Know Nothing gain from Whig		Swing		
