= Alfred A. Burnham =

American politician (1819–1879)

Alfred Avery Burnham

Member of the U.S. House of Representatives from Connecticut's 3rd district
- In office March 4, 1859 – March 3, 1863
- Preceded by: Sidney Dean
- Succeeded by: Augustus Brandegee

48th Lieutenant Governor of Connecticut
- In office 1857–1858
- Governor: Alexander H. Holley
- Preceded by: Albert Day
- Succeeded by: Julius Catlin

Speaker of the Connecticut House of Representatives
- In office 1858
- Preceded by: Eliphalet Adams Bulkeley
- Succeeded by: Oliver Henry Perry
- In office 1870
- Preceded by: Lafayette S. Foster
- Succeeded by: Edwin Holmes Bugbee

Member of the Connecticut House of Representatives
- In office 1844–1845, 1850, 1858, 1870

Personal details
- Born: March 8, 1819 Windham, Connecticut, U.S.
- Died: April 11, 1879 (aged 60) Windham, Connecticut, U.S.
- Party: Republican

Alfred Avery Burnham (March 8, 1819 – April 11, 1879) was an American politician who was a U.S. Congressman, a lieutenant governor of Connecticut, a speaker of the Connecticut House of Representatives, and the clerk of the Connecticut Senate. He worked as a lawyer in Windham, Connecticut.

== Biography ==
Born in Windham, Connecticut, Burnham completed a preparatory course and attended college for one year before studying law. He was admitted to the bar in 1843 and commenced practice in Windham. He served as member of the Connecticut House of Representatives in 1844, 1845, 1850, and 1858, serving as speaker in 1858. He served as clerk of the Connecticut Senate in 1847, and was the 48th Lieutenant Governor of Connecticut in 1857.

Burnham was elected as a Republican to the Thirty-sixth and Thirty-seventh Congresses (March 4, 1859 – March 3, 1863). He was not a candidate for renomination in 1862. He was again a member of the Connecticut House of Representatives in 1870 and served again as speaker.

He died in Windham, Connecticut, on April 11, 1879, aged 60. He was interred in Windham Cemetery, Windham Center, Connecticut.

Political offices
Preceded by Albert Day	Lieutenant Governor of Connecticut; 1857-1858	Succeeded by Julius Catlin
U.S. House of Representatives
Preceded by Sidney Dean	Member of the U.S. House of Representatives from Connecticut's 3rd congressional district 1859–1863	Succeeded by Henry H. Starkweather
