= 1856 North Carolina gubernatorial election =

- August 7, 1856
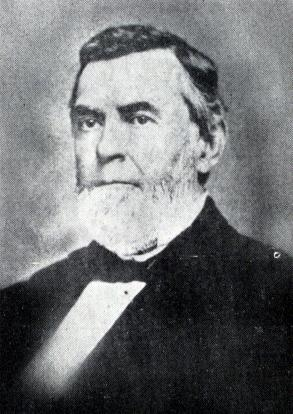

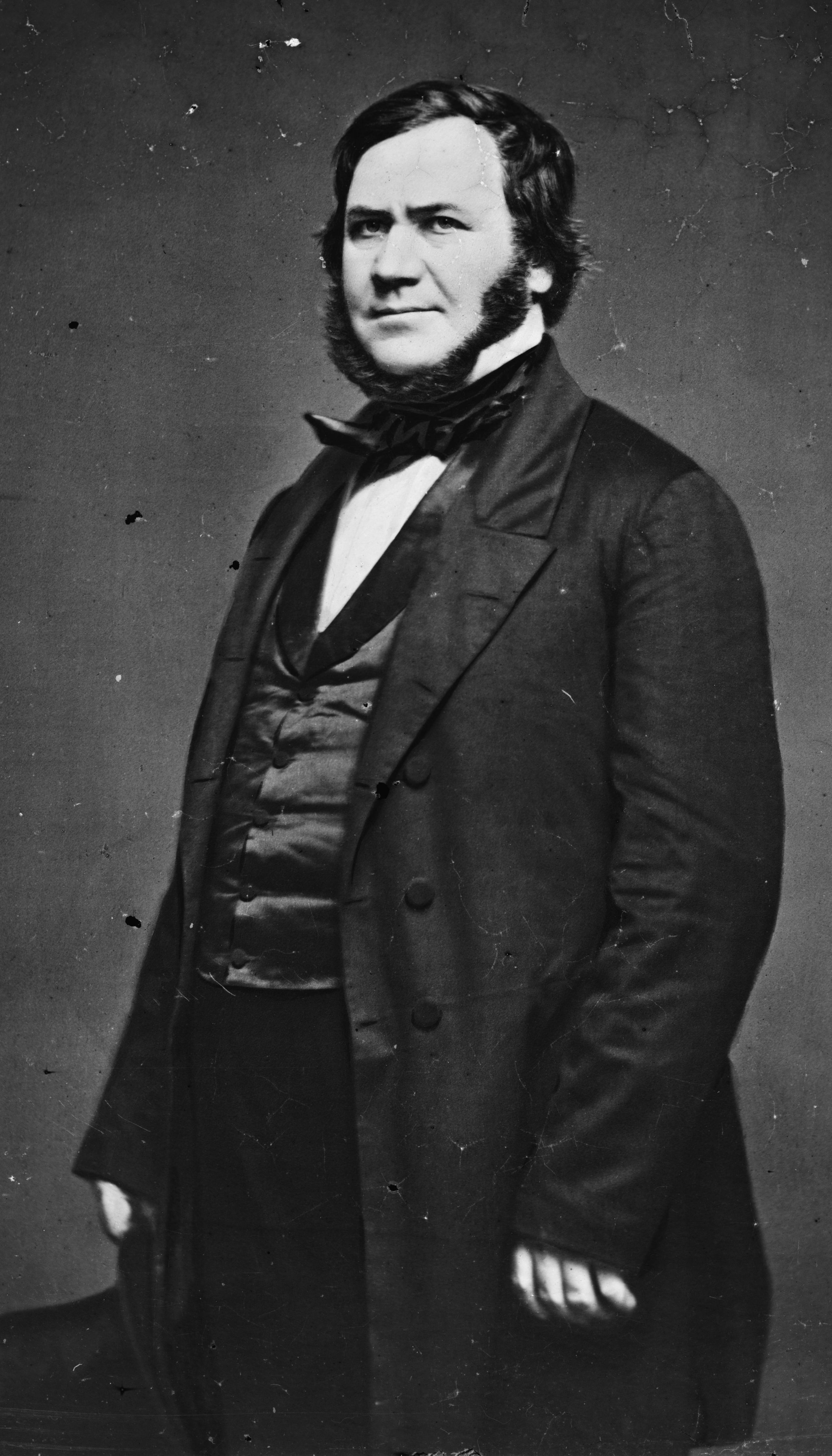
Nominee	Thomas Bragg	John Adams Gilmer
Party	Democratic	Know Nothing
Popular vote	57,698	44,970
Percentage	56.20%	43.80%
- County results Bragg: 50–60% 60–70% 70–80% 80–90% >90% Gilmer: 50–60% 60–70% 70–80% 80–90% No vote
Governor before election
Thomas Bragg
Democratic
Elected Governor
Thomas Bragg
Democratic

The 1856 North Carolina gubernatorial election was held on August 7, 1856, in order to elect the governor of North Carolina. Incumbent Democratic governor Thomas Bragg won re-election against Know Nothing nominee and former member of the North Carolina Senate John Adams Gilmer.

== General election ==
On election day, August 7, 1856, incumbent Democratic governor Thomas Bragg won re-election by a margin of 12,728 votes against his opponent Know Nothing nominee John Adams Gilmer, thereby retaining Democratic control over the office of governor. Bragg was sworn in for his second term on January 1, 1857.

=== Results ===
North Carolina gubernatorial election, 1856
Party	Candidate	Votes	%
Democratic	Thomas Bragg (incumbent)	57,698	56.20
Know Nothing	John Adams Gilmer	44,970	43.80
Total votes		102,668	100.00
Democratic hold			
