= 1854 Connecticut gubernatorial election =

- April 3, 1854
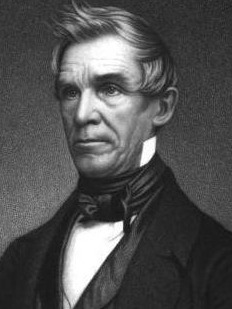

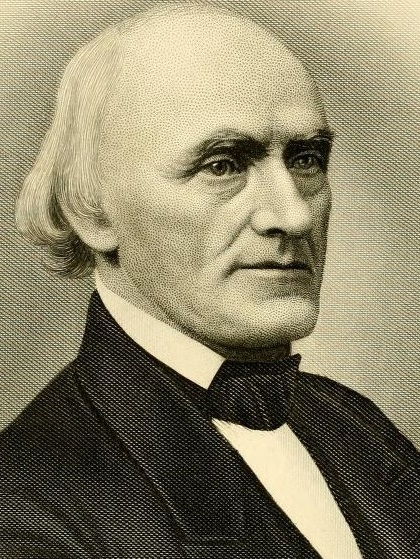
Nominee	Henry Dutton	Samuel Ingham	Charles Chapman
Party	Whig	Democratic	Temperance
Electoral vote	140	93
Popular vote	19,465	28,338	10,672
Percentage	31.89%	46.43%	17.49%
- Dutton: 30–40% 40–50% 50–60% 60–70% English: 30–40% 40–50% 50–60% 60–70% 70–80% Chapman: 30–40% 40–50% 50–60%
Governor before election
Charles H. Pond (acting)
Democratic
Elected Governor
Henry Dutton
Whig

The 1854 Connecticut gubernatorial election was held on April 3, 1854. Former state legislator and Whig Party nominee Henry Dutton defeated former congressman and Democratic nominee Samuel Ingham and former congressman Charles Chapman with 31.89% of the vote.

Although Ingham won a large plurality of the vote, he did not receive a majority. As a result, the Connecticut General Assembly elected the governor, per the state constitution. Dutton won the vote over Ingham, 140 to 93, in the General Assembly, and became the governor. This was the first of two elections in which Ingham would receive a plurality of more than 10% in the popular vote and lose the election, the second being 1856.

Dutton won even though he earned a smaller percentage of the popular vote than the previous four elections that the Whigs lost, winning with fewer than one third of the votes. The deterioration of the Whig vote share was similar to the national party collapse, as part of the political transition from the Second Party System to the Third Party System. This was the last time the Whigs won election to the governor's office, the last time the Whigs would finish second in the popular vote, and the last such election in which the Free Soil Party participated.

== General election ==
=== Candidates ===
Major party candidates

- Henry Dutton, Whig
- Samuel Ingham, Democratic

Minor party candidates

- Charles Chapman, Temperance
- John Hooker, Free Soil

=== Results ===
1854 Connecticut gubernatorial election
Party	Candidate	Votes	%	±%
Democratic	Samuel Ingham	28,338	46.43%	
Whig	Henry Dutton	19,465	31.89%	
Temperance	Charles Chapman	10,672	17.49%	
Free Soil	John Hooker	2,560	4.19%	
Plurality		8,873		
Turnout				

1854 Connecticut gubernatorial election, contingent General Assembly election
Party	Candidate	Votes	%	±%
Whig	Henry Dutton	140	60.09%	
Democratic	Samuel Ingham	93	39.91%	
Majority		47		
Whig gain from Democratic		Swing		
