= 1856 New York gubernatorial election =

- November 4, 1856
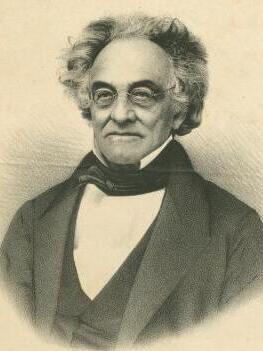

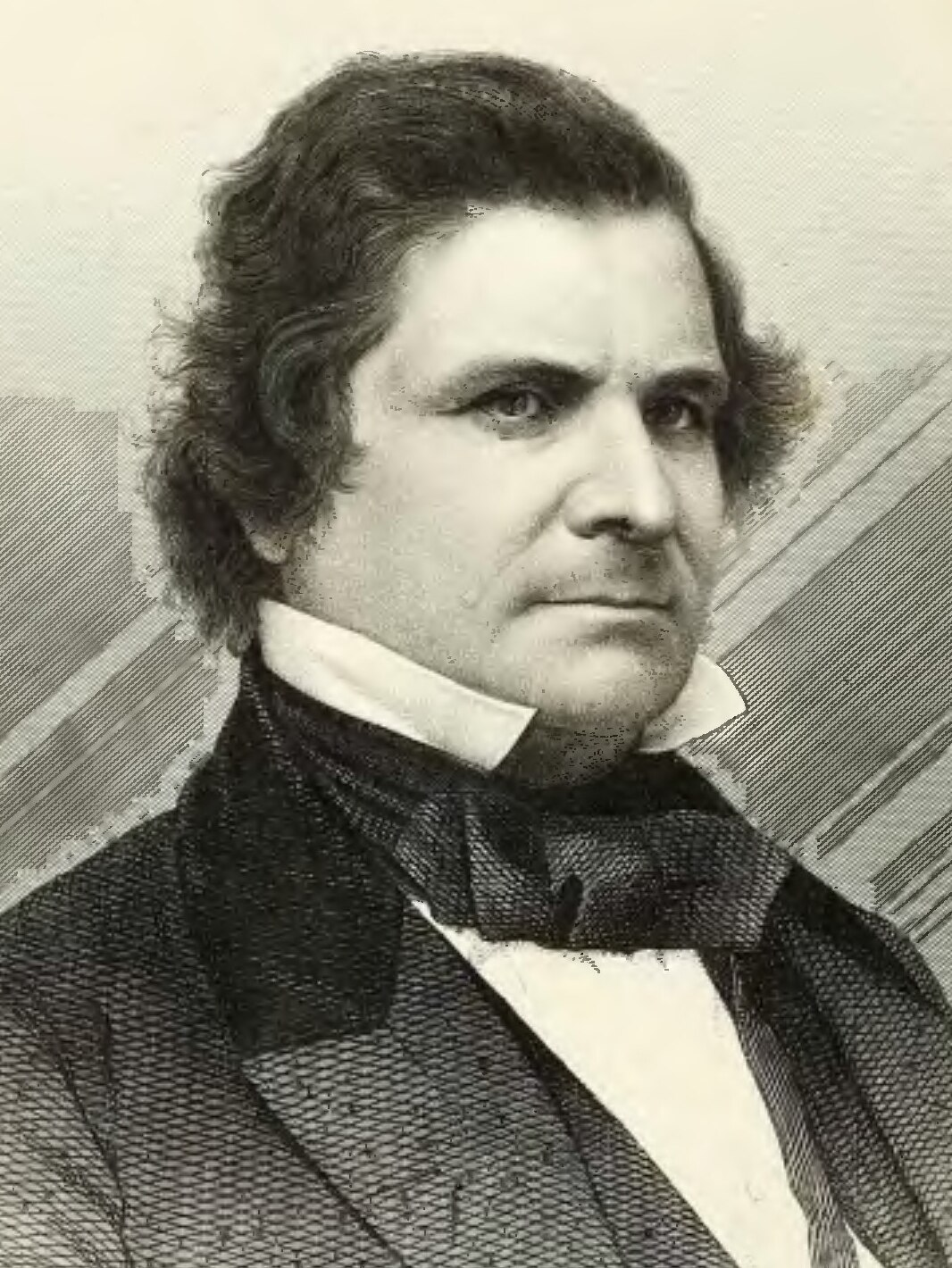

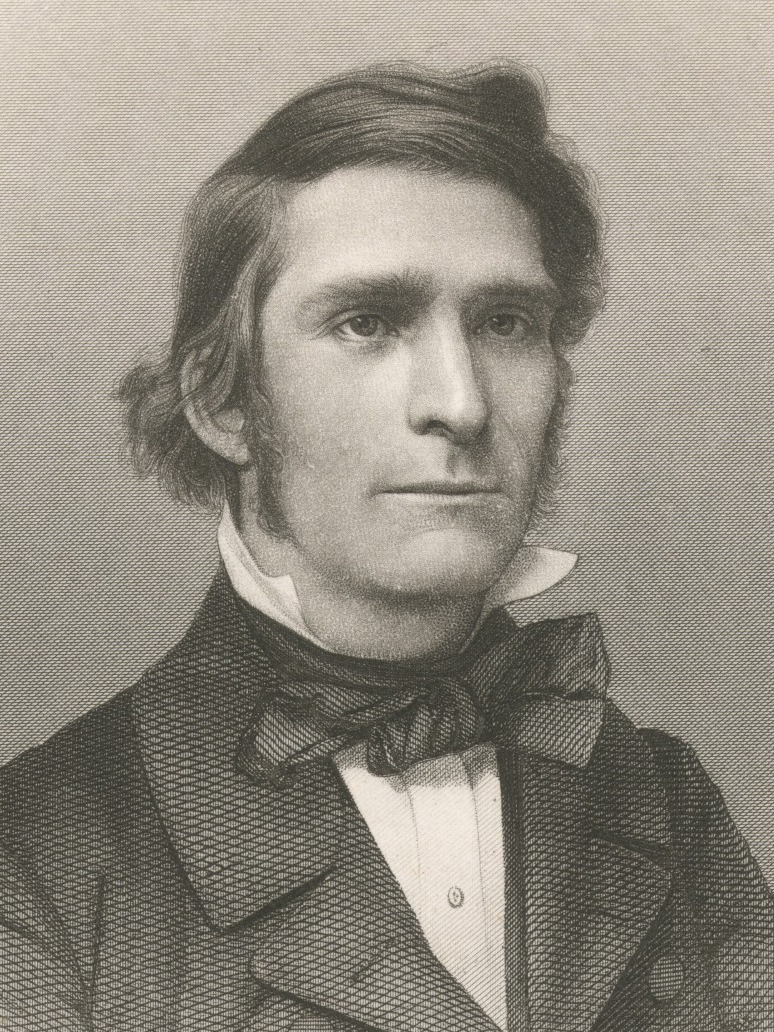
Nominee	John A. King	Amasa J. Parker	Erastus Brooks
Party	Republican	Democratic	Know Nothing
Popular vote	264,400	198,616	130,870
Percentage	44.52%	33.44%	22.04%
- County results King: 30–40% 40–50% 50–60% 60–70% 70–80% Parker: 30–40% 40–50% 50–60% Brooks: 30–40% 40–50%
Governor before election
Myron Clark
Whig
Elected Governor
John Alsop King
Republican

The 1856 New York gubernatorial election was held on November 4, 1856. Incumbent Governor Myron Clark did not run for re-election to a second term in office. In the race to succeed him, John A. King defeated Amasa J. Parker and Erastus Brooks to become the first Republican elected Governor of New York.

== Democratic nomination ==
=== Background ===
In the 1840s, the New York Democratic Party split between its anti-slavery "Barnburner" wing and its conservative "Hunker" wing, culminating in the nomination of Martin Van Buren for president on a Barnburner "Free Soil" ticket in 1848.

Following the Compromise of 1850, the two wings initially reconciled, though there was a further split in the Hunker camp between "Hard Shell" men who opposed reconciliation and "Soft Shell" men, who favored it. After the Kansas-Nebraska Act passed, renewed attention on the issue of slavery broke this fragile truce, and all factions were once again at odds. The Hards, who believed that anti-slavery men no longer had any place in the Democratic Party, broke off to form their own "National Democratic" ticket, while many radical anti-slavery men also broke from the Democrats to join the Anti-Nebraska and Free Soil parties in 1854. Following their disastrous defeat in the 1854 election, the national Democratic Party, led by presidential nominee James Buchanan, urged the wings of the New York party to reconcile once more and unite behind a single candidate.

=== Candidates ===
- John W. Brown, Justice of the New York Supreme Court and former U.S. Representative from Newburgh
- Orestes Brownson, Catholic intellectual
- Erastus Corning, former mayor of Albany and State Senator
- Daniel S. Dickinson, former U.S. Senator and Lieutenant Governor
- Samuel Fowler
- Addison Gardiner, former Chief Judge of the New York Court of Appeals and Lieutenant Governor (withdrawn following third ballot)
- Amasa J. Parker, former Justice of the New York Supreme Court and U.S. Representative from Delhi
- Porter[data missing]
- Henry W. Rogers (withdrawn following first ballot)
- Augustus Schell, attorney and chair of the Democratic State Committee (withdrawn following third ballot)
- David L. Seymour, former U.S. Representative from Troy
- John Vanderbilt, former State Senator from Flatbush
- Fernando Wood, mayor of New York City (withdrawn following third ballot)

==== Declined to be drafted ====
- Horatio Seymour, former Governor (following first ballot)

=== Results ===
The Soft Shell state convention met on July 30 at Market Hall in Syracuse. The Hard Shell Democratic state convention met at the same time at Corinthian Hall in the same city. The Soft delegates adopted a resolution to unite with the Hards and marched to Corinthian Hall where both factions assembled together.

On the first ballot, Addison Gardiner led with 69 votes against 45 for David L. Seymour. Horatio Seymour received twenty-one votes, but announced that he was not a candidate for nomination and that no possible situation could induce him to accept the nomination. Henry Rogers was also removed from consideration. John Kelly, the boss of Tammany Hall, gave a speech urging the nomination of Fernando Wood, and a motion was passed to require a bare majority of votes to elect a nominee.

Gardiner also led the second and third ballots. On the final ballot, the names of Schell, Gardiner and Wood were withdrawn; Gardiner delegates endorsed Parker for the nomination. With the other leading candidates out of the race, Parker received a clear majority on the fourth ballot, and his nomination was made unanimous.

Results by ballot
	1st	2nd	3rd	4th
Addison Gardiner	69	78	80	–
David L. Seymour	46	67	60	
Amasa J. Parker	33	39	39	
Fernando Wood	25	26	22	–
John Vanderbilt	21	18	15	
Horatio Seymour	21	–	–	–
Augustus Schell	11	22	30	–
Erastus Corning	9	3	–	–
John W. Brown	8	–	–	–
Henry W. Rogers	7	–	–	–
Daniel S. Dickinson	1	–	–	–
Orestes Brownson	1	–	–	–
Samuel Fowler	1	1	–	–
Porter	1	–	–	–
Total	254	254	261	

== American nominations ==
The American Party state convention met on September 23 and 24 at Rochester, New York. Erastus Brooks, the editor of the New York Express was nominated for Governor by acclamation.

The North American Party, which had seceded from the American Party earlier in the year and which had considered joining the Republicans, met on the same day at the Court House in the same city. In the afternoon, after some debate, they marched to the American convention and re-united, endorsing their ticket and declaring support for the American presidential candidates Millard Fillmore and Andrew Jackson Donelson for the 1856 presidential election.

== General election ==
=== Candidates ===
- Erastus Brooks, editor of the New York Express (American)
- William Goodell, editor of the Radical Abolitionist (Radical Abolitionist)
- John A. King, former U.S. Representative from Jamaica and son of Rufus King (Republican)
- Amasa J. Parker, former Justice of the New York Supreme Court and U.S. Representative from Delhi (Democratic)

=== Results ===
1854 New York gubernatorial election
Party	Candidate	Votes	%	±%
Republican	John A. King	264,400	44.53%	N/A
Democratic	Amasa J. Parker	198,616	33.44%	▲0.12
Know Nothing	Erastus Brooks	130,870	22.04%	▼3.99
Total votes		593,886	100.00%	

== See also ==
- New York gubernatorial elections
- 1856 United States elections
