= 1855 Faroese general election =

Danish territorial election

General elections were held in the Faroe Islands in 1855. Eighteen members were elected from seven constituencies, an increase from sixteen, with one additional seat granted to the Eysturoy and Suðurstreymoy constituencies. The Danish administrator (Amtmaður) and the local dean (Próstur) were also members, with the administrator serving as the speaker.

== Results ==
Constituency	Elected members	Notes
Eysturoy	Daniel Peder Christiansen	
Eysturoy	Andreas Djurhuus	Re-elected
Eysturoy	Johannes Petersen	Re-elected
Eysturoy	Sámal Jákup Weihe	
Norðurstreymoy	Hans Olsen	
Norðurstreymoy	Niels Winther	Previously elected in Eysturoy
Norðoyggjar	Joen Daniel-Jacobsen	
Norðoyggjar	Hans David Matras	Re-elected
Sandoy	Jacob Jacobsen	Re-elected
Sandoy	Hans Jacob Jørgen Sørensen	Re-elected
Suðuroy	Niels Jacob Joensen	
Suðuroy	Harald Andreas Christian Krogh	
Suðurstreymoy	Joen Jacobsen	
Suðurstreymoy	Andreas Christian Lützen	Re-elected
Suðurstreymoy	Gerhardt Sigvart Rehling	
Suðurstreymoy	Jens Wenningstedt	Re-elected
Vágar	Heine Heinesen	
Vágar	Jacob Zachariasen	Re-elected
Source: Løgting

=== By constituency ===
Norðurstreymoy
Candidate	Votes	%
Niels Winther	6	30.00
Hans Olsen	5	25.00
Johannes Bærentsen	3	15.00
Samuel Peter Samuelsen	1	5.00
Christian Djurhuus	1	5.00
Ole Hansen	1	5.00
Jens Hendrik Djurhuus	1	5.00
Thomas Zachariasen	1	5.00
Johan Olsen	1	5.00
Total	20	100.00
Total votes	10	–
Registered voters/turnout	142	7.04
Source: Løgting

== Aftermath ==
Norðurstreymoy representative Niels Winther left the Faroes in 1857 and a by-election was held on 7 August. Of the 135 registered voters, only eight voted, all of whom voted for Hans Christopher Müller.

Gerhardt Sigvart Rehling also left the country in 1857 and was replaced by Jacob Nolsøe.
