= 1855 Wisconsin lieutenant gubernatorial election =

- November 6, 1855
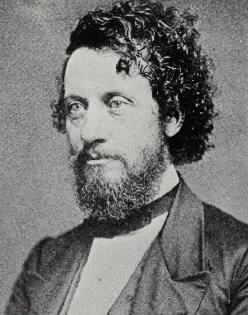

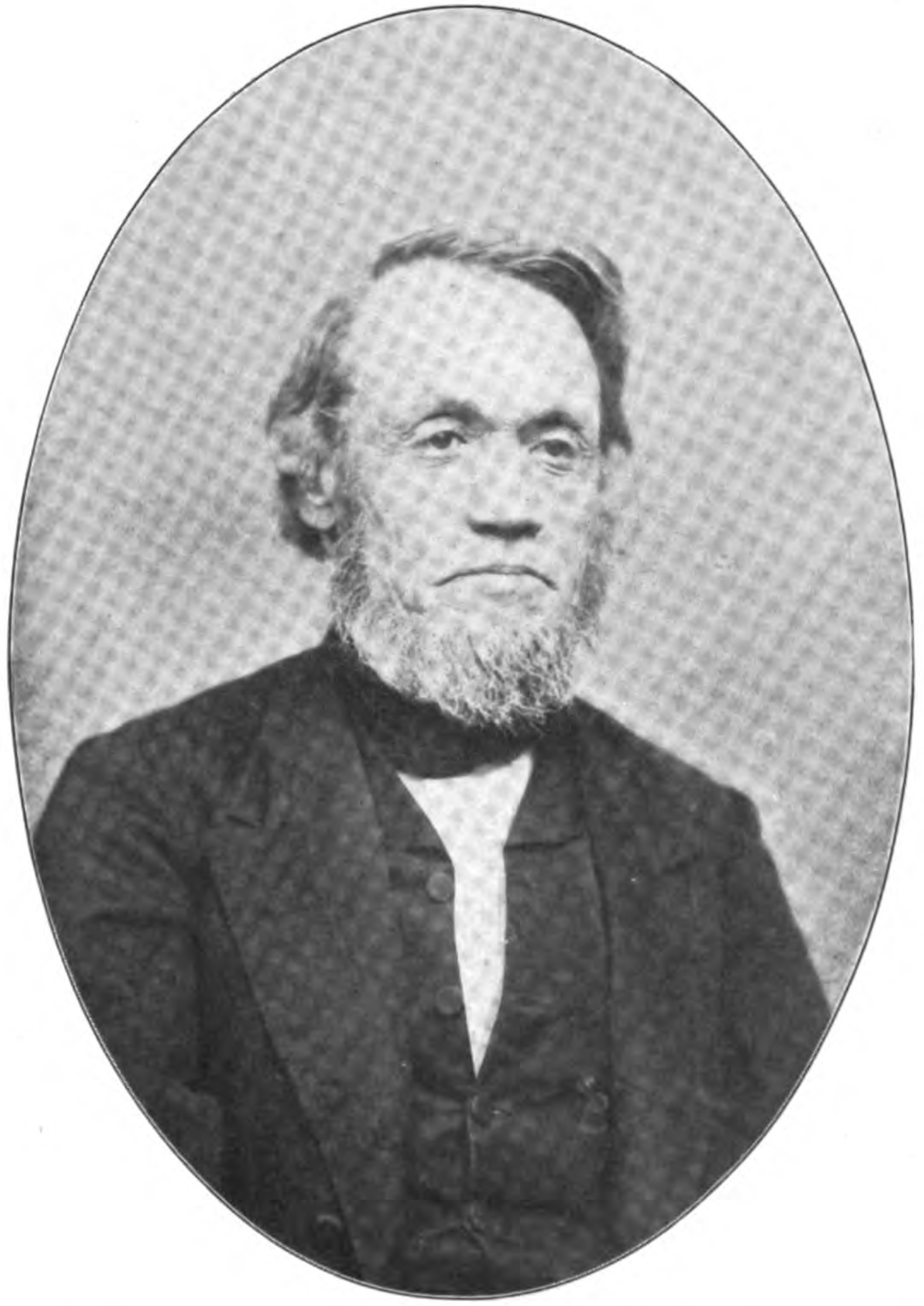
Nominee	Arthur MacArthur Sr.	Charles Sholes
Party	Democratic	Republican
Popular vote	38,040	35,160
Percentage	51.97%	48.03%
Lieutenant Governor before election
James T. Lewis
Democratic
Elected Lieutenant Governor
Arthur MacArthur Sr.
Democratic

The 1855 Wisconsin lieutenant gubernatorial election was held on November 6, 1855, in order to elect the lieutenant governor of Wisconsin. Democratic nominee Arthur MacArthur Sr. defeated Republican nominee and incumbent Speaker of the Wisconsin State Assembly Charles Sholes.

== General election ==
On election day, November 6, 1855, Democratic nominee Arthur MacArthur Sr. won the election by a margin of 2,880 votes against his opponent Republican nominee Charles Sholes, thereby retaining Democratic control over the office of lieutenant governor. MacArthur was sworn in as the 5th lieutenant governor of Wisconsin on January 6, 1856.

=== Results ===
Wisconsin lieutenant gubernatorial election, 1855
Party	Candidate	Votes	%
Democratic	Arthur MacArthur Sr.	38,040	51.97
Republican	Charles Sholes	35,160	48.03
	Scattering	8	0.00
Total votes		73,208	100.00
Democratic hold			
