= 1856 Honduran presidential election =

Presidential elections were held in Honduras in 1856. The result was a victory for José Santos Guardiola.

== Results ==
No candidate received a majority in the popular vote, resulting in the General Chamber electing conservative José Santos Guardiola as president and José María Lazo Guillén as vice president on 14 February. The two took office on 17 February.
