= Henry Dutton (politician) =

American politician (1796–1869)

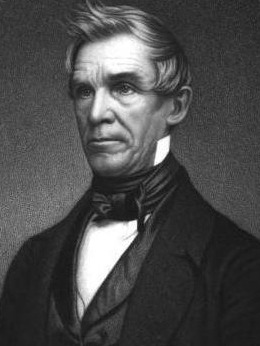

38th Governor of Connecticut
- In office May 3, 1854 – May 2, 1855
- Lieutenant: Alexander H. Holley
- Preceded by: Charles H. Pond
- Succeeded by: William T. Minor

Member of the Connecticut House of Representatives
- In office 1850; 1838-1839; 1834; 1828

Member of the Connecticut Senate
- In office 1849

Personal details
- Born: February 12, 1796 Plymouth, Connecticut
- Died: April 26, 1869 (aged 73)
- Party: Whig
- Spouse: Elizabeth Elliot Joy Dutton
- Education: Yale University
- Profession: lawyer, politician
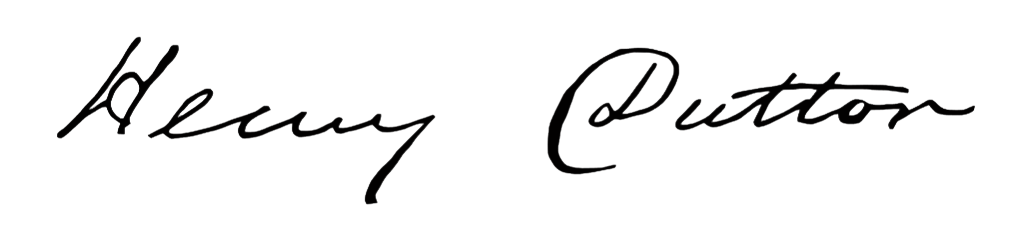
- Signature

Henry Dutton (February 12, 1796 – April 26, 1869) was an American politician and the 38th governor of Connecticut.

== Biography ==
Dutton was born in Plymouth, Connecticut on February 12, 1796. He studied at Yale University and graduated in 1818. While he tutored at Yale University from 1821 to 1823, he studied law with the Hon. Roger Minot Sherman. He also was principal at the Fairfield Academy for two years. In 1823 he was admitted to the bar. He married Elizabeth Elliot Joy and they had three daughters and one son.

== Career ==
Dutton moved to Newtown, Connecticut in 1823. He served in the Connecticut House of Representatives in 1828, 1834, 1838, 1839, and 1850. He moved to Bridgeport in 1837, and then to New Haven, Connecticut in 1847 to accept the appointment to become Kent Professor of Law at Yale, a position he held until his death. He was also a member of the Connecticut Senate in 1849. He served as President pro tempore of the Connecticut Senate. He was the unsuccessful candidate for governor in 1853 of the Whig Party.

Dutton was elected Governor of Connecticut in 1854 becoming the last Whig to hold that office. Although he had finished second place to Democrat Samuel Ingham in the April popular vote, because no candidate received a majority, the state legislature decided the election. Dutton was elected by a vote of 140 to 93 in the state legislature (known as the Connecticut General Assembly). During his term, the Kansas-Nebraska Bill became law in May 1854, and a prohibition law was also enacted.

In 1855, Dutton ran unsuccessfully for re-election and finished in third place behind both Ingham and the victor William T. Minor. He left office on May 2, 1855. After completing his term, he served on the bench of the Superior Court and the Supreme Court of Errors from 1861 to 1866.

== Death ==
Dutton died on April 26, 1869, and is interred at the Grove Street Cemetery, New Haven, New Haven County, Connecticut.

Party political offices
Preceded by Green Kendrick	Whig nominee for Governor of Connecticut; 1853, 1854, 1855	Succeeded by John A. Rockwell
Political offices
Preceded by Charles H. Pond	Governor of Connecticut; 1854–1855	Succeeded by William T. Minor
