= Samuel Ingham =

American politician (1793–1881)

Member of the U.S. House of Representatives from Connecticut
- In office March 4, 1835 – March 3, 1839
- Preceded by: Phineas Miner (AL); District established (2nd)
- Succeeded by: District eliminated (AL); William L. Storrs (2nd)
- Constituency: At-large district (1835-37); 2nd district (1837-39)

Personal details
- Born: September 5, 1793 Hebron, Connecticut, U.S.
- Died: November 10, 1881 (aged 88) Essex, Connecticut, U.S
- Party: Democratic
- Other political affiliations: Jacksonian (before 1837)

Samuel Ingham (September 5, 1793 – November 10, 1881) was a two-term congressman from Connecticut.

== Early life ==
Samuel Ingham was born on September 5, 1793, in Hebron, Connecticut. He attended the common schools in Vermont, studied law with John Mattocks and Sylvester Gilbert, was admitted to the bar and commenced practice in Canaan, Vermont. He moved to Jewett City, Connecticut, and in 1819, to Essex (then part of Saybrook), Connecticut, and continued the practice of his profession.

== Career ==
He served as state's attorney for Middlesex County, and was a member of the Connecticut House of Representatives in 1828, 1834, 1851 and 1852 (serving as speaker in 1833, 1835 and 1851). He served as judge of probate judge of the Middlesex County Court. He was elected as a Jacksonian to the Twenty-fourth Congress and reelected as a Democrat to the Twenty-fifth Congress (March 4, 1835 – March 3, 1839). He was chairman of the Committee on Naval Affairs (Twenty-fifth Congress). He was defeated for re-election in 1839 to the Twenty-sixth Congress.

He served in the Connecticut Senate in 1842, 1846, and 1850. He served as President pro tempore of the Connecticut Senate and was four times the Democratic nominee for governor of Connecticut (1854–57). Although he finished in first place twice, winning a plurality of more than 10% both times (1854 and 1856), lacking a popular majority, the legislature chose a different candidate. He was also an unsuccessful Democratic candidate for the United States Senate in 1854. He served as United States commissioner of customs from December 5, 1857, to May 14, 1861. He then resumed the practice of law.

== Personal life ==
He lived in Saybrook and Essex. Ingham died in Essex on November 10, 1881. He was interred in River View Cemetery.

His daughter Lydia Ann Ingham was the wife of James Phelps, who also served in Congress. His daughter Mary Wilson Ingham married Edward Champlin Williams, a merchant sea captain.

Party political offices
Preceded by Thomas H. Seymour	Democratic nominee for Governor of Connecticut; 1854, 1855, 1856, 1857	Succeeded by James T. Pratt
U.S. House of Representatives
Preceded by Phineas Miner	United States Representative for the at-large Congressional District of Connecticut; 1835–1837	Succeeded by District abolished
Preceded by District created	United States Representative for the 2nd Congressional District of Connecticut; 1837–1839	Succeeded by William L. Storrs
