= Charles Wiley Taylor =

American physician and politician

Charles Wiley Taylor (January 11, 1786 – December 5, 1865) was an American medical doctor and politician.

He was born on January 11, 1786, in Norwalk, Connecticut, the youngest son of the farmers Ahijah and Isabella (Wiley) Taylor. He graduated from Yale College in 1807. He studied medicine, soon after graduation, with David Eichmond of Saugatuck village (now in Westport, Connecticut) and then for a while practiced in his native town.

About 1811, he removed to Florida, Orange County, New York, where he also practiced medicine and taught school, William H. Seward being one of his pupils. After three or four years, his health becoming impaired, he returned to Westport, where he spent the rest of his life, mainly in agricultural pursuits. He was several times a representative in the Connecticut State Legislature. He was never married. He died on December 5, 1865, in the house where he was born.
