= 1856 Connecticut gubernatorial election =

- April 7, 1856
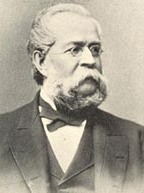

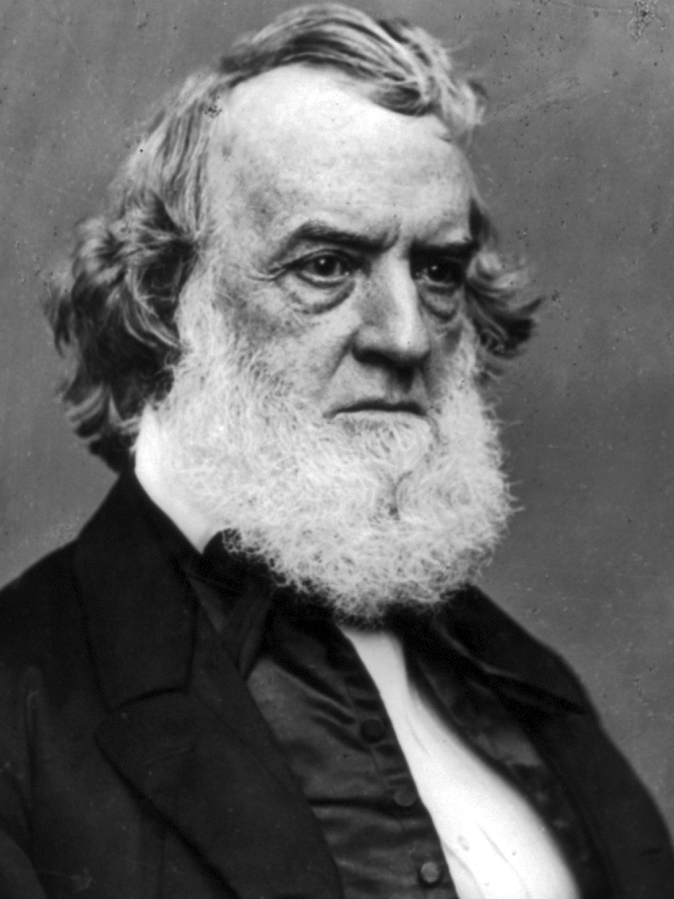
Nominee	William T. Minor	Samuel Ingham	Gideon Welles
Party	Know Nothing	Democratic	Republican
Electoral vote	135	116
Popular vote	26,008	32,704	6,740
Percentage	38.99%	49.02%	10.10%
- Ingham: 30–40% 40–50% 50–60% 60–70% 70–80% Minor: 40–50% 50–60% 60–70% Welles: 40–50%
Governor before election
William T. Minor
Know Nothing
Elected Governor
William T. Minor
Know Nothing

The 1856 Connecticut gubernatorial election was held on April 7, 1856. Incumbent governor and American Party nominee William T. Minor defeated former congressman and Democratic nominee Samuel Ingham and former Comptroller of Connecticut and Republican nominee Gideon Welles with 38.99% of the vote.

In accordance with the national transition from the Second Party System to the Third Party System, this was the first such election in which the Republicans fielded a candidate, the last in which the Know-Nothings would run (and win), and the last in which the Whig Party participated.

Although Ingham won a strong plurality of the vote, he fell just short of a majority. As a result, the Connecticut General Assembly elected the governor, per the state constitution. Minor won the vote over Ingham, 135 to 116, in the General Assembly, and became the governor. This was the second election in which Ingham would receive a plurality of more than 10% and still lose, the first being 1854.

== General election ==
=== Candidates ===
Major party candidates

- William T. Minor, American or Know Nothing
- Samuel Ingham, Democratic
- Gideon Welles, Republican
- John A. Rockwell, Whig

=== Results ===
1856 Connecticut gubernatorial election
Party	Candidate	Votes	%	±%
Democratic	Samuel Ingham	32,704	49.02%	
Know Nothing	William T. Minor (incumbent)	26,008	38.99%	
Republican	Gideon Welles	6,740	10.10%	
Whig	John A. Rockwell	1,258	1.89%	
Plurality		6,696		
Turnout				

1856 Connecticut gubernatorial election, contingent General Assembly election
Party	Candidate	Votes	%	±%
Know Nothing	William T. Minor (incumbent)	135	53.78%	
Democratic	Samuel Ingham	116	46.22%	
Majority		19		
Know Nothing hold		Swing		
