= Timothy Taylor Merwin =

American politician (1807–1885)

Member of the Connecticut General Assembly
- In office 1838–1839

Personal details
- Born: August 22, 1807 New Haven, Connecticut, U.S.
- Died: January 15, 1885 (aged 77) Brooklyn, New York, U.S.
- Resting place: Danbury, Connecticut, U.S.
- Spouse: Hannah Barto White (m. 1830)
- Children: 3
- Relatives: Robert Treat (great-great-great-great grandfather)
- Education: Yale College; Yale Law School
- Occupation: Politician; lawyer; businessman

Timothy Taylor Merwin (August 22, 1807 – January 15, 1885) was an American lawyer, state legislator, and businessman from Connecticut.

== Early life ==
Timothy Taylor Merwin was born on August 22, 1807, in New Haven, Connecticut, as the eldest child to Clarina Bradley (née Taylor) and Samuel Merwin. His great-great-great-great grandfather was Connecticut colonial governor Robert Treat. His father was a graduate of Yale College and a pastor of the United Society (later called the United Church on the Green) in New Haven. Merwin attended Phillips Academy in Andover, Massachusetts. He graduated from Yale College in 1827. He attended Yale Law School for two years and was admitted to the bar in Connecticut in June 1829.

== Career ==
Merwin served as a member of the Connecticut General Assembly, representing Norwalk, in 1838. He also served as clerk of the superior courts of Fairfield County from 1839 to 1842. He was proprietor and editor of the Norwalk Gazette.

In 1829, Merwin began practicing law in Norwalk, Connecticut. He continued practicing law there until December 1843. He then moved to New York City. He then worked in mercantile business. He later served in management of a railroad and worked as a broker on the New York Stock Exchange. In 1862, he was one of the founders and organizers of the North American Life Insurance Company. He served as its first secretary and later as its vice president. He served as the vice president of the company until his death. He was a member of the New England Society and the Long Island Historical Society.

== Personal life ==
Merwin married Hannah Barto White, youngest daughter of E. Moss White, of Danbury, Connecticut, in September 1830. They had two sons and one daughter, including Alexander Moss. His wife died in 1843.

Merwin died of heart disease on January 15, 1885, at his Garden Place home in Brooklyn. He was buried in Danbury.
