= William Field (American politician) =

American politician (1790–1878)

Lieutenant Governor of Connecticut
- In office May 2, 1855 – May 7, 1856
- Governor: Henry Dutton
- Preceded by: Alexander H. Holley
- Succeeded by: Albert Day

Member of the Connecticut State Senate from the 14th district
- In office 1849–1850

Connecticut State Comptroller
- In office 1836–1838
- Governor: Henry W. Edwards
- Preceded by: Gideon Welles
- Succeeded by: Henry Kilbourn

Personal details
- Born: April 12, 1790 Pomfret, Connecticut
- Died: September 20, 1878 (aged 88) Stafford, Connecticut
- Party: Free Soil Party; Jacksonian Democrat
- Spouse: Martha Pinney
- Children: 5
- Parents: William Field (father); Lydia Colwell (mother)

William Field (April 12, 1790 – September 20, 1878) was an American politician who was the 46th lieutenant governor of Connecticut from 1855 to 1856.

== Early life ==
Field was born on April 12, 1790, in Pomfret, Connecticut, to William Field and Lydia Colwell. He was descended from Roger Williams, the founder of Rhode Island on his maternal side. In his early life Field worked at forging machinery. He served in the U.S. military during the War of 1812 in a New London, Connecticut, company.

He married Martha Pinney in 1820; they had five children and resided in Stafford, Connecticut. Her death in 1835 left him a widower.

== Political career ==
In 1835, Field was nominated on the Jacksonian Democrat ticket to the office of Connecticut state comptroller. He was elected and served from 1836 to 1838.

He was elected a member of Connecticut state senate, representing the 14th District from 1849-50. In 1855, Field was elected Lieutenant Governor of Connecticut as a Free Soil Party candidate.

Field died on September 20, 1878, aged 88, in Stafford, Connecticut.

Political offices
Preceded by Alexander H. Holley	Lieutenant Governor of Connecticut; 1855-1856	Succeeded by Albert Day
