= Albert Day (politician) =

American politician (1797–1876)

Lieutenant Governor of Connecticut
- In office May 7, 1856 – May 6, 1857
- Governor: William T. Minor
- Preceded by: William Field
- Succeeded by: Alfred A. Burnham

Personal details
- Born: November 29, 1797
- Died: November 11, 1876 (aged 78)
- Political party: Know Nothing

Albert Day (November 29, 1797 – November 11, 1876) was an American politician who was the 47th lieutenant governor of Connecticut.

He was the lieutenant governor from 1856 to 1857, during the last of two consecutive one-year terms when William T. Minor was the governor of the state.

Political offices
Preceded by William Field	Lieutenant Governor of Connecticut; 1856-1857	Succeeded by Alfred A. Burnham
