= Alexander H. Holley =

American politician (1804–1887)

Alexander Hamilton Holley
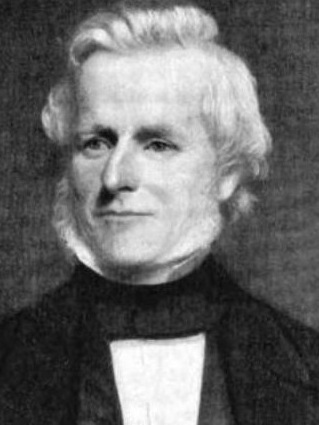

40th Governor of Connecticut
- In office May 6, 1857 – May 5, 1858
- Lieutenant: Alfred A. Burnham
- Preceded by: William T. Minor
- Succeeded by: William Alfred Buckingham

45th Lieutenant Governor of Connecticut
- In office May 3, 1854 – May 2, 1855
- Governor: Henry Dutton
- Preceded by: Charles H. Pond
- Succeeded by: William Field

Personal details
- Born: August 12, 1804 Salisbury, Connecticut, U.S.
- Died: October 2, 1887 (aged 83) Lakeville, Connecticut, U.S.
- Party: Whig, Republican
- Spouse(s): Jane M. Lyman, Marcia Coffing and Sarah C. Day
- Children: 6, including Alexander Lyman Holley
- Profession: Manufacturer, banker, and politician

Alexander Hamilton Holley (August 12, 1804 – October 2, 1887) was an American politician and the 40th governor of Connecticut.

== Life and politics ==
Holley was born in Salisbury, Connecticut, on August 12, 1804. He was a Congregationalist and studied at the public schools in Massachusetts, Connecticut, and New York. He was married to Jane M. Lyman (1808–1832), Marcia Coffing and Sarah C. Day. He had six children.

== Career ==
Holley served in the state militia, rising through the ranks to lieutenant colonel. He entered politics in 1844, serving as a delegate to the Whig National Convention. Holley became president of the Holley Manufacturing Company in 1854 and held that position for life. He also became director of the Salisbury Iron Bank and Connecticut Western Railroad.

Holley was nominated by the Republican Party and elected the 45th lieutenant governor of Connecticut in 1854, and elected the governor of Connecticut in 1857. During his term, his administration endorsed the requirement for recently naturalized citizens to wait one year before being eligible to vote, and the Supreme Court ruled on the Dred Scott case. He left office on May 5, 1858. He was a delegate to Republican National Convention from Connecticut, 1860, and retired from public service.

== Death ==
Holley died on October 2, 1887, in Lakeville. He is buried at Salisbury Cemetery, Salisbury, Connecticut.

Party political offices
Preceded by Gideon Welles	Republican nominee for Governor of Connecticut; 1857	Succeeded by William Alfred Buckingham
Political offices
Preceded by Vacant	Lieutenant Governor of Connecticut; 1854–1855	Succeeded by William Field
Preceded by William T. Minor	Governor of Connecticut; 1857–1858	Succeeded by William A. Buckingham
