= List of elections in 1853 =

The following elections occurred in the year 1853.

- 1852–53 Colombian presidential election
- 1853 Costa Rican general election
- February 1853 Danish Folketing election
- May 1853 Danish Folketing election
- 1853 Dutch general election
- 1853 Greek parliamentary election
- 1853 Liberian general election
- 1853 Mexican general election
- 1853 New Zealand general election
- 1853 Norwegian parliamentary election

== North America ==
=== United States ===
- 1853 New York state election

==== United States Senate ====
- 1852–53 United States Senate elections

==== United States House of Representatives ====
- 1852 and 1853 United States House of Representatives elections

==== United States lieutenant gubernatorial ====
- 1853 California lieutenant gubernatorial election
- 1853 Connecticut lieutenant gubernatorial election
- 1853 Texas lieutenant gubernatorial election
- 1853 Wisconsin lieutenant gubernatorial election

==== United States gubernatorial ====
- 1853 Alabama gubernatorial election
- 1853 California gubernatorial election
- 1853 Connecticut gubernatorial election
- 1853 Georgia gubernatorial election
- 1853 Maine gubernatorial election
- 1853 Maryland gubernatorial election
- 1852-53 Massachusetts gubernatorial election
- 1853-54 Massachusetts gubernatorial election
- 1853 Mississippi gubernatorial election
- 1853 New Hampshire gubernatorial election
- 1853 New Jersey gubernatorial election
- 1853 Ohio gubernatorial election
- 1853 Rhode Island gubernatorial election
- 1853 Tennessee gubernatorial election
- 1853 Texas gubernatorial election
- 1853 Vermont gubernatorial election
- 1853 Wisconsin gubernatorial election

==== United States mayoral elections ====
- 1853–54 Boston mayoral election
- 1853 Chicago mayoral election
- 1853 Manchester, New Hampshire, mayoral election
- 1853 Philadelphia mayoral election

== South America ==
=== Argentina ===
- 1853 Argentine presidential election

== See also ==
- Category:1853 elections
