= 1850 Connecticut lieutenant gubernatorial election =

- April 3, 1850
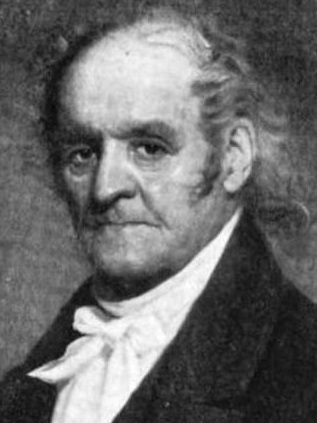

Nominee	Charles H. Pond	Green Kendrick
Party	Democratic	Whig
Popular vote	28,942	28,213
Percentage	48.20%	46.90%
Lieutenant Governor before election
Thomas Backus
Whig
Elected Lieutenant Governor
Charles H. Pond
Democratic

The 1850 Connecticut lieutenant gubernatorial election was held on April 3, 1850, to elect the lieutenant governor of Connecticut. Democratic nominee and former judge of New Haven County Court Charles H. Pond received a plurality of the votes against Whig nominee Green Kendrick. However, since no candidate received a majority in the popular vote, Charles H. Pond was elected by the Connecticut General Assembly per the Connecticut Charter of 1662.

== General election ==
On election day, April 3, 1850, Democratic nominee Charles H. Pond won a plurality of the vote by a margin of 729 votes against his foremost opponent Whig nominee Green Kendrick. However, as no candidate received a majority of the vote, the election was forwarded to the Connecticut General Assembly, who elected Charles H. Pond, thereby gaining Democratic control over the office of lieutenant governor. Pond was sworn in as the 42nd lieutenant governor of Connecticut on May 5, 1850.

=== Results ===
Connecticut lieutenant gubernatorial election, 1850
Party	Candidate	Votes	%
Democratic	Charles H. Pond	28,942	48.20
Whig	Green Kendrick	28,213	46.90
	Scattering	2,946	4.90
Total votes		60,101	100.00
Democratic gain from Whig			
