= 1852 United States elections =

- ← 1850 1851 1852 1853 1854 → Presidential election year
- Election day: November 2
- Incumbent president: ▌Millard Fillmore (W)
- Next Congress: 33rd

Presidential election
- Partisan control: Democratic gain
- Popular vote margin: Democratic +6.9%
- Electoral vote
- Franklin Pierce (D): 254
- Winfield Scott (W): 42
- 1852 presidential election results. Blue denotes states won by Pierce, buff denotes states won by Scott. Numbers indicate the electoral votes won by each candidate.

Senate elections
- Overall control: Democratic hold
- Seats contested: 20 of 62 seats
- Net seat change: Democratic -1

House elections
- Overall control: Democratic hold
- Seats contested: All 237 voting members
- Net seat change: Democratic +30

Elections for the 33rd United States Congress, were held in 1852 and 1853. The election marked the end of the Second Party System, as the Whig Party ceased to function as a national party following this election. The Democrats won the presidency and retained control of both houses of Congress.

In the presidential election, the Democratic former senator Franklin Pierce of New Hampshire defeated the Whig General Winfield Scott. Pierce won the popular vote by a margin of 7%, and dominated the electoral college. John P. Hale of the Free Soil Party also took about 5% of the popular vote. Pierce won on the 49th ballot of the 1852 Democratic National Convention, defeating 1848 nominee Lewis Cass, former Secretary of State James Buchanan, former Secretary of War William L. Marcy, and Senator Stephen A. Douglas from Illinois. Incumbent Whig president Millard Fillmore ran for a full term, but the 1852 Whig National Convention chose Scott, another popular general. Scott's popularity was based on his military career, similar to the former Whig presidents William Henry Harrison and Zachary Taylor who were considered military heroes. Fillmore became the first incumbent president to lose his party's presidential nomination. Scott was the last Whig presidential candidate, as the party collapsed during the 1850s. However, this election was also the last time a Democratic candidate would win a majority of the popular and electoral vote until Franklin D. Roosevelt did so in 1932.

In the House, Democrats won several seats, boosting their majority. In the Senate, Democrats won minor gains, maintaining their commanding majority.

== See also ==
- 1852 United States presidential election
- 1852–53 United States House of Representatives elections
- 1852–53 United States Senate elections
