= 1851 Connecticut lieutenant gubernatorial election =

- April 2, 1851
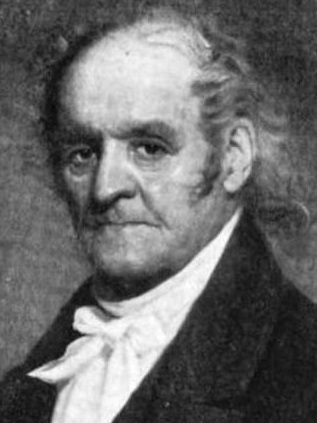

Nominee	Charles H. Pond	Green Kendrick
Party	Democratic	Whig
Popular vote	30,065	28,905
Percentage	48.90%	47.00%
Lieutenant Governor before election
Charles H. Pond
Democratic
Elected Lieutenant Governor
Green Kendrick
Whig

The 1851 Connecticut lieutenant gubernatorial election was held on April 2, 1851, to elect the lieutenant governor of Connecticut. Incumbent Democratic lieutenant governor Charles H. Pond received a plurality of the votes against Whig nominee Green Kendrick in a rematch of the previous election. However, since no candidate received a majority in the popular vote, Green Kendrick was elected by the Connecticut General Assembly per the Connecticut Charter of 1662.

== General election ==
On election day, April 2, 1851, incumbent Democratic lieutenant governor Charles H. Pond won a plurality of the vote by a margin of 1,160 votes against his foremost opponent Whig nominee Green Kendrick. However, as no candidate received a majority of the vote, the election was forwarded to the Connecticut General Assembly, who elected Green Kendrick, thereby gaining Whig control over the office of lieutenant governor. Kendrick was sworn in as the 43rd lieutenant governor of Connecticut on May 7, 1851.

=== Results ===
Connecticut lieutenant gubernatorial election, 1851
Party	Candidate	Votes	%
Whig	Green Kendrick	28,905	47.00
Democratic	Charles H. Pond (incumbent)	30,065	48.90
	Scattering	2,575	4.10
Total votes		61,545	100.00
Whig gain from Democratic			
