= List of elections in 1851 =

The following elections occurred in the year 1851.

- 1851 Belgian general election
- 1851 Chilean presidential election
- 1851 Liberian general election
- 1851 Luxembourg general election
- 1851 Portuguese legislative election
- 1851 South Australian colonial election
- 1851 Swiss federal election

== North America ==
=== United States ===
- 1851 New York state election

==== United States Senate ====
- 1850 and 1851 United States Senate elections
- 1851 United States Senate election in Massachusetts
- 1851 United States Senate election in New York
- 1851 United States Senate election in Pennsylvania
- 1851 United States Senate election in Wisconsin

==== United States House of Representatives ====
- 1850 and 1851 United States House of Representatives elections

==== United States lieutenant gubernatorial ====
- 1851 California lieutenant gubernatorial election
- 1851 Connecticut lieutenant gubernatorial election
- 1851 Texas lieutenant gubernatorial election
- 1851 Wisconsin lieutenant gubernatorial election

==== United States gubernatorial ====
- 1851 Alabama gubernatorial election
- 1851 California gubernatorial election
- 1851 Connecticut gubernatorial election
- 1851 Georgia gubernatorial election
- 1851 Kentucky gubernatorial election
- 1850-51 Massachusetts gubernatorial election
- 1851-52 Massachusetts gubernatorial election
- 1851 Michigan gubernatorial election
- 1851 Mississippi gubernatorial election
- 1851 New Hampshire gubernatorial election
- 1851 Ohio gubernatorial election
- 1851 Pennsylvania gubernatorial election
- 1851 Rhode Island gubernatorial election
- 1851 Tennessee gubernatorial election
- 1851 Texas gubernatorial election
- 1851 Vermont gubernatorial election
- 1851 Virginia gubernatorial election
- 1851 Wisconsin gubernatorial election

==== United States mayoral elections ====
- 1851 Boston mayoral election
- 1851 Chicago mayoral election
- 1851 Manchester, New Hampshire, mayoral election
- 1851 Philadelphia mayoral election

== See also ==
- Category:1851 elections
