= 1850 United States elections =

- ← 1848 1849 1850 1851 1852 → Midterm elections
- Incumbent president: ▌Millard Fillmore (W)
- Next Congress: 32nd

Senate elections
- Overall control: Democratic hold
- Seats contested: 21 of 62 seats
- Net seat change: Democratic -2

House elections
- Overall control: Democratic hold
- Seats contested: All 233 voting seats
- Net seat change: Democratic +7

Elections occurred part way through Whig President Millard Fillmore's term, during the Second Party System. Fillmore had become president on July 9, 1850, upon the death of President Zachary Taylor. Members of the 32nd United States Congress were also chosen in this election. Democrats kept control of both houses of the Congress of the United States.

In the House, Democrats won several seats from the Whigs, building on their continued control of the chamber. Several supporters of the Georgia Platform also won election as Unionists.

In the Senate, Whigs lost a small number of seats to Democrats and the minor Free Soil Party. Democrats however retained a strong majority.

== See also ==
- 1850–51 United States House of Representatives elections
- 1850–51 United States Senate elections
