= 1849 Connecticut lieutenant gubernatorial election =

- April 4, 1849

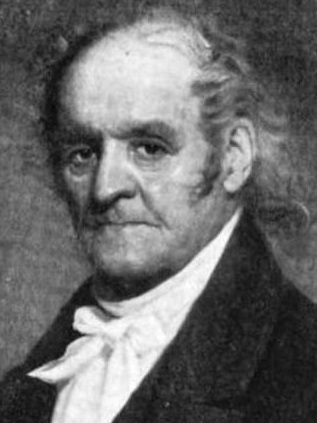
Nominee	Thomas Backus	Charles H. Pond
Party	Whig	Democratic
Popular vote	28,036	25,235
Percentage	49.40%	44.50%
Lieutenant Governor before election
Charles J. McCurdy
Whig
Elected Lieutenant Governor
Thomas Backus
Whig

The 1849 Connecticut lieutenant gubernatorial election was held on April 4, 1849, to elect the lieutenant governor of Connecticut. Whig nominee and former member of the Connecticut State Senate Thomas Backus received a plurality of the votes against Democratic nominee and former judge of New Haven County Court Charles H. Pond. However, since no candidate received a majority in the popular vote, Thomas Backus was elected by the Connecticut General Assembly per the Connecticut Charter of 1662.

== General election ==
On election day, April 4, 1849, Whig nominee Thomas Backus won a plurality of the vote by a margin of 2,801 votes against his foremost opponent Democratic nominee Charles H. Pond. However, as no candidate received a majority of the vote, the election was forwarded to the Connecticut General Assembly, who elected Thomas Backus, thereby retaining Whig control over the office of lieutenant governor. Backus was sworn in as the 41st lieutenant governor of Connecticut on May 2, 1849.

=== Results ===
Connecticut lieutenant gubernatorial election, 1849
Party	Candidate	Votes	%
Whig	Thomas Backus	28,036	49.40
Democratic	Charles H. Pond	25,235	44.50
	Scattering	3,498	6.10
Total votes		56,769	100.00
Whig hold			
