= 1853 Connecticut lieutenant gubernatorial election =

- April 6, 1853
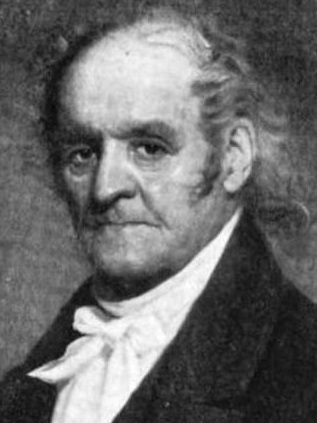

Nominee	Charles H. Pond	Nathaniel Kellogg	John Boyd
Party	Democratic	Whig	Free Soil
Popular vote	30,926	20,815	8,695
Percentage	51.20%	34.40%	14.40%
Lieutenant Governor before election
Charles H. Pond
Democratic
Elected Lieutenant Governor
Charles H. Pond
Democratic

The 1853 Connecticut lieutenant gubernatorial election was held on April 6, 1853, to elect the lieutenant governor of Connecticut. Incumbent Democratic lieutenant governor Charles H. Pond won re-election against Whig nominee Nathaniel Kellogg and Free Soil nominee and former member of the Connecticut House of Representatives John Boyd.

== General election ==
On election day, April 6, 1853, incumbent Democratic lieutenant governor Charles H. Pond won re-election with 51.20% of the vote, thereby retaining Democratic control over the office of lieutenant governor. Pond was sworn in for his third term on May 4, 1853.

=== Results ===
Connecticut lieutenant gubernatorial election, 1853
Party	Candidate	Votes	%
Democratic	Charles H. Pond (incumbent)	30,926	51.20
Whig	Nathaniel Kellogg	20,815	34.40
Free Soil	John Boyd	8,695	14.40
	Scattering	3	0.00
Total votes		60,439	100.00
Democratic hold			
