= Lafayette S. Foster =

American politician and jurist (1806–1880)

La Fayette S. Foster
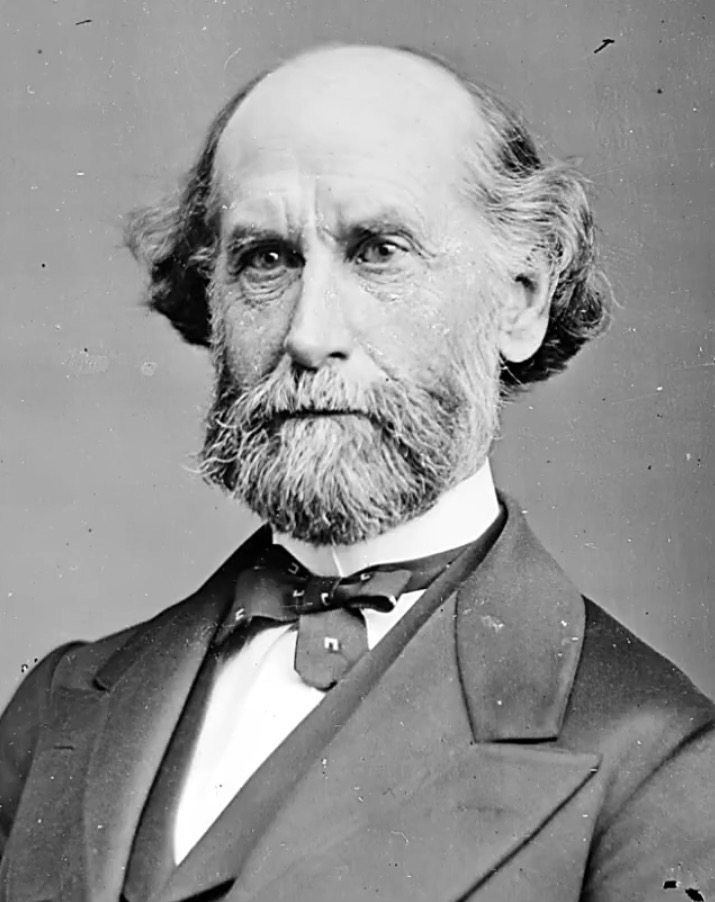
- Foster, c. 1855–1865

President pro tempore of the United States Senate
- In office March 7, 1865 – March 2, 1867
- Preceded by: Daniel Clark
- Succeeded by: Benjamin Wade

United States Senator from Connecticut
- In office March 4, 1855 – March 3, 1867
- Preceded by: Francis Gillette
- Succeeded by: Orris S. Ferry

Mayor of Norwich
- In office 1851–1852
- Preceded by: William Alfred Buckingham
- Succeeded by: William Alfred Buckingham

Speaker of the Connecticut House of Representatives
- In office 1847–1848, 1854, 1870
- Preceded by: Cyrus Hall Beardslee
- Succeeded by: Alfred A. Burnham

Member of the Connecticut House of Representatives from Norwich
- In office May 5, 1870 – July 22, 1870
- In office 1854 – June 8, 1854
- In office May 6, 1846 – June 28, 1848
- In office 1839–1840

Personal details
- Born: La Fayette Sabine Foster; November 22, 1806 Franklin, Connecticut, U.S.
- Died: September 19, 1880 (aged 73) Norwich, Connecticut, U.S.
- Party: Whig (Before 1856); Republican (1856–1866); Democratic (1866–1880)
- Spouses: Joanna Boylston Lanman (m. 1837; died 1859) Martha Prince Lyman (m. 1860)
- Children: 3
- Education: Brown University (BA, LL.D.)

La Fayette Sabine Foster (Note: Foster himself wrote his name as La Fayette S. Foster, or L. F. S. Foster. Journals of the Connecticut House of Representatives most often refer to Foster as La Fayette S. Foster, or occasionally as LaFayette S. Foster.) (November 22, 1806 – September 19, 1880) was an American politician and jurist from Connecticut. He served in the United States Senate from 1855 to 1867 and was a judge on the Connecticut Supreme Court from 1870 to 1876. He was President pro tempore of the United States Senate from 1865 to 1867, and was first in the presidential line of succession for most of his tenure, following the assassination of Abraham Lincoln.

== Biography ==
Lafayette Sabine Foster was born in Franklin, Connecticut, on November 22, 1806, to Daniel Foster and his second wife, Welthea Ladd. His father Daniel was a captain in the Continental Army and fought in several battles including the battles of White Plains, Stillwater, and Saratoga. Daniel Foster was a lieutenant in Latimer's Regiment of Militia during the Battle of Saratoga. While on the field of battle, he received a warrant of promotion to the post of adjutant.

Foster began his education in the common schools around Franklin. He entered his college preparatory studies under the tuition of the Rev. Abel Flint of Hartford, Connecticut, who he studied under for five months. Foster taught school in Franklin for two subsequent winters. He completed his preparatory studies under the Rev. Cornelius B. Everest of Windham, Connecticut, in 1824, and in February 1825 enrolled at Brown University in Providence, Rhode Island. He graduated from Brown University in 1828. He was an assistant in the school of Roswell C. Smith in Providence for the winter after his graduation. In the following spring, he began to study law back in Norwich, Connecticut, in the office of Calvin Goddard. He took charge of an academy in Centerville, Maryland, and he was admitted to the Maryland bar in 1830.

In 1831, he returned to Connecticut and was admitted to the bar of New London County. He opened a law office in Hampton, Connecticut in 1833, but a year later moved back to Norwich, which became his home for the rest of his life.

On October 2, 1837, Foster married Joanna Boylston Lanman, the daughter of the former U.S. Senator, Connecticut judge, and mayor of Norwich, James Lanman. Foster was then editor of the Norwich Republican, a Whig newspaper, but relinquished that position after his legal business greatly increased.

He was first elected as one of the representatives of the town of Norwich to the Connecticut House of Representatives in 1839. He was elected to the House again in 1840, 1846, 1847, 1848, 1854, and 1870.

In 1846, Foster took his first journey to Europe, sailing for Liverpool on the packet ship Henry Clay, under captain Ezra Nye, on October 7, 1846. He visited the law courts in London and also visited Paris. He recorded his observations and appreciations in his journal.

By 1847, he was one of the most important Whigs in Connecticut. He was elected as the Speaker of the Connecticut House of Representatives in 1847 and re-elected in 1848. In 1848, he was considered as a candidate for US Senator and received several votes for the nomination, but was ultimately unsuccessful. Also in that year, Foster was appointed State Director of the Merchants' Bank of Norwich.

He was Whig candidate for Governor of Connecticut in the 1850 election, but lost narrowly to Democrat) candidate Thomas H. Seymour, 48% to 47%. Because Seymour had a plurality, not a majority, he was elected by the Connecticut General Assembly.

Foster had a very busy year in 1851. He ran again for governor and again lost narrowly (49%-47%), and the election again went to the General Assembly. The Whigs had a slight majority in the Assembly, but there was division amongst them, and Seymour was re-elected by one vote, 122–121.

Foster was instead appointed again to the Merchants' Bank.

Then in the US Senate election, the Whigs failed to elect Roger S. Baldwin, with Foster also getting a few votes. After 22 ballots with no result, the election was indefinitely postponed and the seat was left vacant.

Foster was awarded a Legum Doctor degree in 1851 by Brown University. Foster was the mayor of Norwich from 1851 to 1852.

In 1854 he was again elected as the Speaker of the Connecticut House of Representatives. Two days after the Kansas–Nebraska Act was passed by the House in May 1854, he addressed a public meeting in New Haven, Connecticut, saying that the time for speechmaking was over, and the time for action against slavery had come. He resigned his seat in the Connecticut House of Representatives on June 8, 1854. On May 19, 1854, the Whigs and Free Soilers in the Assembly combined to elect Foster to the US Senate for the full six-year term beginning in 1855. Foster was a Whig at the time of his election to the Senate but joined the Republican Party before the end of the 34th Congress.

Foster's first notable speech in the Senate was given on June 25, 1856, in which he eulogized and defended the participants of a public meeting in New Haven held to extend aid to departing emigrant Free-Staters, and analyzed the arguments of Stephen A. Douglas, the author of the Kansas–Nebraska Act. In 1858, during the debate on Kansas statehood under the proposed Lecompton Constitution, he said the repeal of the Missouri Compromise "was a violation of plighted faith. I believe it was an outrage upon the moral sense of the nation, and it ought not to have been done." He also said he would never vote for the admission of a slave state formed from territory north of the 36°30′ parallel. Foster's wife, Joanna Boylston Lanman, died on April 11, 1859.

On January 4, 1860, Foster addressed the Senate regarding a resolution to print the annual message to the Senate given by President James Buchanan. Buchanan's message included a recommendation that he be authorized "to employ a sufficient military force to enter Mexico, for the purpose of obtaining indemnity for the past and security for the future." Foster opposed Buchanan's recommendation in a speech condemning it as unconstitutional, against international law, and with intent to conquer Mexico, which he considered undesirable for many reasons. He asked the question, "Is the life, liberty, or property of an American citizen, within the slaveholding States of this confederacy today, who entertains opinions obnoxious to those communities on the subject of slavery, any more safe than the liberty or property of our citizens within the Republic of Mexico?" He referred to the advertisements in Southern journals setting prices on the heads of Northern abolitionists, to the outrages committed by the polygamist Mormons in the Utah Territory, (Note: Alluding to the Mountain Meadows Massacre) and to the bad faith of the U.S. government toward the Native Americans.

In May 1860, Foster was re-elected to the Senate, defeating Democrat William W. Eaton.

In the 37th to the 39th Congress (1861-1867), he served as chairman of the Committee on Pensions. On October 2, 1860, Foster married Martha Prince Lyman.

Foster was elected President pro tempore of the Senate on March 6, 1865, and held the office until he resigned on March 2, 1867. Six weeks into his tenure, President Abraham Lincoln was assassinated, and Vice President Andrew Johnson succeeded to the presidency. Consequently, Foster became first in the line of presidential succession. From 1865 to 1867, Foster was described as "acting vice president" by many, even though no such position is defined in the Constitution.

In 1866 Foster was elected as a Companion of the Third Class (i.e. an honorary member) of the Pennsylvania Commandery of the Military Order of the Loyal Legion of the United States – a military society of officers who served in the Union armed forces during the American Civil War and their descendants.

Foster sought reelection to a third term in 1866, but was defeated by Orris S. Ferry; his Senate career ended on March 3, 1867. He became a professor of law at Yale College in 1869 and returned to the Connecticut House of Representatives in 1870. He was once again elected Speaker of the House, but resigned that same year to take a seat on the Connecticut Supreme Court. He served on the court until 1876 when he reached the mandatory retirement age of 70. During his retirement he helped tutor young lawyers like Charles W. Comstock.

Foster delivered a course of lectures on "Parliamentary Law and the Science of Legislation" at Yale from 1875 to 1880.

In 1875, he was the Democrat candidate for US Representative in Connecticut's 3rd congressional district, but lost to incumbent Republican Henry H. Starkweather.

Foster died in Norwich, on September 19, 1880, and was interred there in Yantic Cemetery.

== Legacy ==
Foster willed his personal library to the town of Norwich and his residence for the use of the Norwich Free Academy. He also endowed two academic endeavors, the Lafayette Sabine Foster Prize in Greek at Brown University and the Lafayette S. Foster Professorship of English Common Law at Yale University. Charles Calverley, an American sculptor, created a marble bust of Foster that was presented to the Senate by Foster's second wife Martha Prince Lyman Foster in 1885. She gave Brown University a portrait of Foster in 1895 that was made by the portraitist Robert Cutler Hinckley.

== Notes ==
Party political offices
| Preceded by Joseph Trumbull | Whig nominee for Governor of Connecticut; 1850, 1851 | Succeeded by Green Kendrick |
U.S. Senate
| Preceded by Francis Gillette | U.S. Senator (Class 3) from Connecticut; 1855–1867; Served alongside: Isaac Toucey, James Dixon | Succeeded by Orris S. Ferry |
| Preceded by John Renshaw Thomson | Chair of the Senate Pensions Committee; 1861–1865 | Succeeded by Peter G. Van Winkle |
Political offices
| Preceded by Daniel Clark | President pro tempore of the United States Senate; 1865–1867 | Succeeded by Benjamin Wade |
