= Governor Trumbull =

Governor Trumbull may refer to:

- John H. Trumbull (1873–1961), 70th Governor of Connecticut
- Jonathan Trumbull (1710–1785), 16th Governor of Connecticut
- Jonathan Trumbull Jr. (1740–1809), 20th Governor of Connecticut
- Joseph Trumbull (governor) (1782–1861), 35th Governor of Connecticut
