= List of elections in 1849 =

The following elections occurred in the year 1849.

- 1849 Chilean parliamentary election
- 1848–49 Colombian presidential election
- 1849 Costa Rican general election
- 1849 Danish Folketing election
- 1849 French legislative election
- 1849 Liberian general election
- 1849 Liberian constitutional referendum

== North America ==
=== United States ===
- 1849 New York state election

==== United States Senate ====
- 1848 and 1849 United States Senate elections
- 1849 United States Senate elections in California
- United States Senate election in New York, 1849
- 1849 United States Senate election in Pennsylvania
- 1849 United States Senate election in Wisconsin

==== United States House of Representatives ====
- 1848 and 1849 United States House of Representatives elections

==== United States lieutenant gubernatorial ====
- 1849 California lieutenant gubernatorial election
- 1849 Connecticut lieutenant gubernatorial election
- 1849 Texas lieutenant gubernatorial election
- 1849 Wisconsin lieutenant gubernatorial election

==== United States gubernatorial ====
- 1849 Alabama gubernatorial election
- 1849 Arkansas gubernatorial special election
- 1849 California gubernatorial election
- 1849 Connecticut gubernatorial election
- 1849 Georgia gubernatorial election
- 1849 Indiana gubernatorial election
- 1849 Louisiana gubernatorial election
- 1849 Maine gubernatorial election
- 1848-49 Massachusetts gubernatorial election
- 1849-50 Massachusetts gubernatorial election
- 1849 Michigan gubernatorial election
- 1849 Mississippi gubernatorial election
- 1849 New Hampshire gubernatorial election
- 1849 Rhode Island gubernatorial election
- 1849 Tennessee gubernatorial election
- 1849 Texas gubernatorial election
- 1849 Vermont gubernatorial election
- 1849 Wisconsin gubernatorial election

==== United States mayoral elections ====
- 1849 Boston mayoral election
- 1849 Chicago mayoral election
- 1849 Manchester, New Hampshire, mayoral election
- 1849 Philadelphia mayoral election

== See also ==
- Category:1849 elections
