= John Kendrick House =

Historic house in Connecticut, United States

- U.S. National Register of Historic Places
- U.S. Historic district – Contributing property
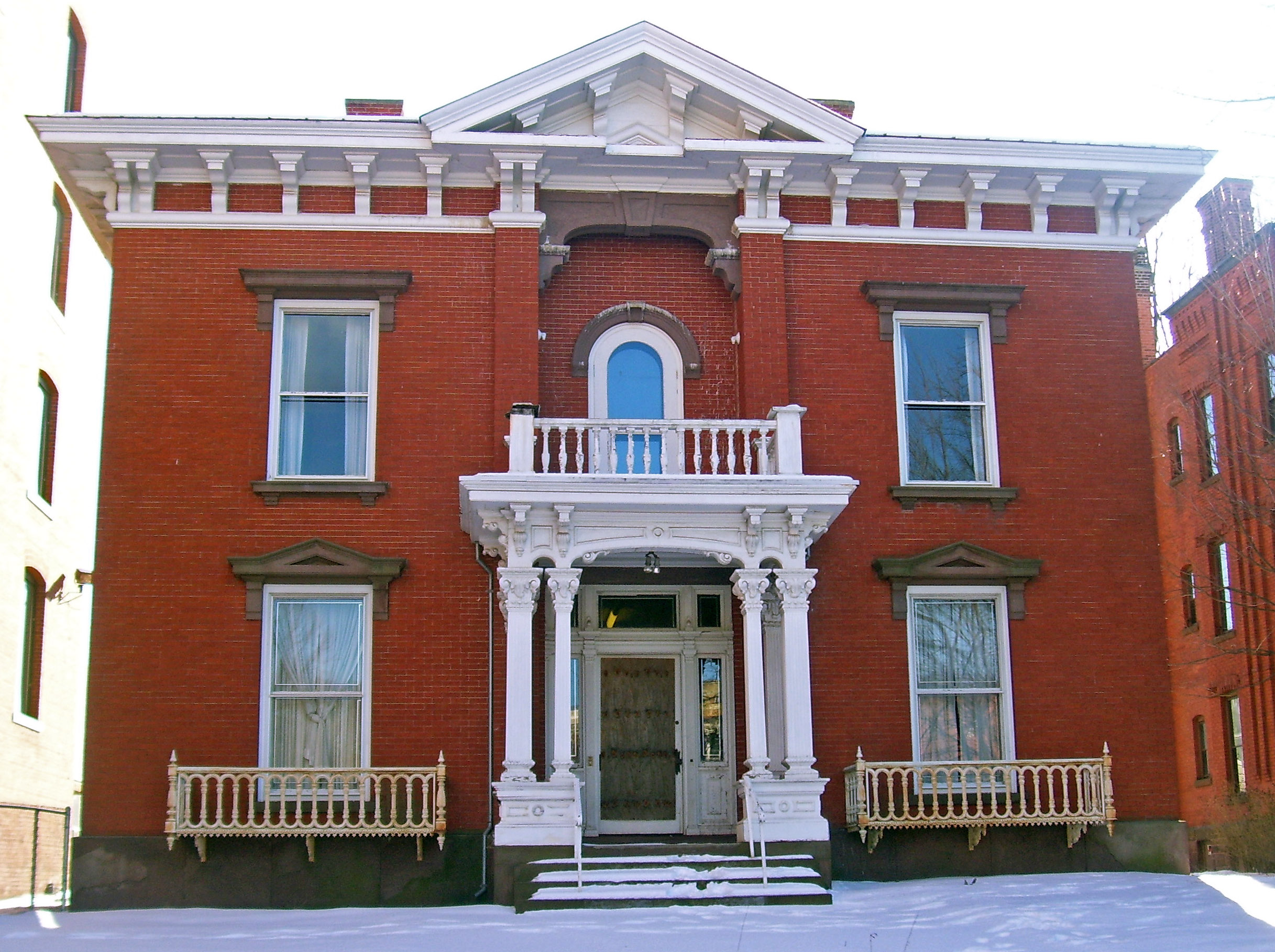
- North elevation, 2009

- Location within Connecticut
- Location: 119 West Main Street, Waterbury, CT
- Coordinates: 41°33′21″N 73°2′35″W
- Built: 1866
- Architect: Henry Austin (possibly)
- Architectural style: Italianate
- Part of: Downtown Waterbury Historic District
- NRHP reference No.: 82004360
- Added to NRHP: 1982

The John Kendrick House is located at 119 West Main Street in Waterbury, Connecticut, United States. It is a brick Tuscan villa house in the Italianate architectural style built in the 1860s, one of the last remaining on Waterbury Green from that period, after which many of the older houses were replaced with commercial buildings. In 1982 it was listed on the National Register of Historic Places individually, after having been included as a contributing property when the Downtown Waterbury Historic District was created a few years earlier.

It was built by Green Kendrick, an early industrialist, for his son John Kendrick, a lawyer who later served as a judge and a mayor of Waterbury. Unpublished papers on file at the Yale University Library, stylistic traits and other historical evidence suggest the house was the work of Henry Austin, although there is no definite proof. In the early 20th century Green's son donated it to the local historical society. It was later used to house the Mattatuck Museum in its early years, and is still owned by the museum although not currently in use.

== Building ==
The Kendrick House is on a small lot on the south side of West Main opposite Waterbury Green, the small park at the center of the city. It is midway between Church and Leavenworth streets. Across the Green are the main Mattatuck Museum building and the Elton Hotel. To the south are parking lots accessible from Kendrick Street. On either side are large commercial blocks that dwarf the house. The terrain is level and the neighborhood is an extensively developed urban core.

A much deeper setback than either of its neighbors provides the house with a front lawn behind a cast iron fence. The building itself is a square two-story three-bay structure of common-bond brick two courses thick on a foundation of granite ashlar with brownstone facing. It is topped by a gently hipped roof surfaced in standing-seam metal pierced by two brick chimneys at the center. A two-story service wing, added later, projects from the rear. It is largely sympathetic but has more restrained decoration.

=== Exterior ===
On the north (front) facade the centrally located main entrance is sheltered by an extensively ornamented wooden portico. A balustrade at the top creates a balcony accessible from a round-arched window the recessed section above it. All the other windows are single-pane double-hung sash windows.

Those on the bottom have small cast-iron balconies of their own with similar patterns to the front fence. Their brownstone sills are matched with pedimented lintels on consoles; the second-story side windows have the same sills but their lintels lack the pediment. The balcony door has a lintel that curves with the arch. Above it there is a pediment in the roofline, where broad wooden eaves are supported by large brackets with leaf carvings.

The entrance portico has square paired fluted Composite pilasters on high pedestals with egg-and-dart and rope-turn molding. Their capitals are more vegetative than is typical for the Composite order, with thick acanthus leaves at the volutes. Above each, foliate paired brackets support the roof.

=== Interior ===
A small set of brownstone steps with a modern iron railing leads up to the portico. The plain entrance door has sidelights and a transom. It opens into a central hallway with carpeting over its interwoven oak and maple parquet floor and dropped ceilings with modern lighting. All the rooms have their original woodwork, including molded baseboards, door and window surrounds and cornice.

The east rooms were combined into a large gallery when the museum occupied the space. The lower hall and stairs have a flat-paneled dado, and the upstairs hallway has a dado of its own with floral and ornamental designs on the plaster. The library, upstairs, has a parquet floor more intricate than the other rooms.

The former museum office is the best-preserved room in the house. In addition to the same original woodwork s the other rooms, it has its original white marble mantel. Its design, referred to as "Grecian" in contemporary catalogs, has a complex-curved shelf supported by consoles over an arched firebox opening with a keyblock carved into the shape of a scallop shell.

== History ==
Greene Kendrick, an early Waterbury brassmaker who later served in the state legislature, built the house in 1866 for his son John. At that time it was one of many grand houses on Waterbury Green, the two-acre (8,000 m^{2}) remnant of the original town common that was by then the center of a growing industrial city. John was unable to replicate his father's success in business and so turned to the law, where he rose to serve as judge and eventually mayor of Waterbury. He lived well; upon his death in 1877 the estate lists rugs and mirrors valued at half the average annual salary of a worker in the city's factories.

The house has all the typical features of the Tuscan villa, an Italianate house type popular with wealthy Victorians embracing the Picturesque mode: a cubical form, nearly flat roof with wide overhanging eaves, and a three-bay facade with most of the decorative touches lavished on the main entrance. Another original detail, a belvedere at the center of the roof, was replaced when the roof was resurfaced. Following their Italian Renaissance models, decoration tended toward very free applications of classical touches, and the Kendrick House's portico is no exception. The square columns in particular do not follow classical proportions, and their plush capitals and leaf brackets further depart from more restrained classical originals.

There is no documentary record that identifies the architect. Several of the additional details—the cast iron balcony balustrades, brownstone trim and verticality created by the emphasis on the central bay—are typical of Henry Austin. Sketches found among Austin's papers after he died, now kept at the Yale University Library, show a very similar house with the same chimney and belvedere placement, but without the brackets and central pediment. They date to the 1840s, prior to the known date of construction, and Austin was known to have been active in Waterbury in the 1860s.

These details are not enough to positively associate the house with Austin, however. Other architects borrowed from his patterns, as he did from theirs. It is quite possible as well that the house is the work of R.W. Hill, a Waterbury native who had worked in Austin's New Haven office.

In 1911, Kendrick's son Greene Kendrick II sold the house to the Mattatuck Historical Society for use as a museum. By that time most of the other houses on the Green and neighboring streets had been demolished and replaced by the larger commercial blocks that dominate the area now. The historical society converted the house for museum use, merging all the east rooms into a large gallery for exhibits. It remained in the house until the construction of its current home across the Green in 1987.

== See also ==
- National Register of Historic Places listings in New Haven County, Connecticut
