= 1854 United States elections =

- ← 1852 1853 1854 1855 1856 → Midterm elections
- Incumbent president: ▌Franklin Pierce (D)
- Next Congress: 34th

Senate elections
- Overall control: Democratic hold
- Seats contested: 21 of 62 seats
- Net seat change: Republican +3

House elections
- Overall control: Opposition gain
- Seats contested: All 234 voting seats
- Net seat change: Opposition +78

Elections were held for the 34th United States Congress during the middle of the Democratic President Franklin Pierce's term. These elections were part of the transition from the Second Party System to the Third Party System, as the Whigs collapsed as a national party and were replaced by a coalition running on the Opposition Party ticket and by the nascent Republican Party.

In the House, the Democrats suffered a massive defeat, losing seats to the Opposition Party, and to the American Party. The latter (also known as the Know Nothings) won more seats in the House than any other third party in the history of the chamber. Nathaniel Banks, a member of the American Party and the Free Soil Party, won election as Speaker of the House after a protracted battle, defeating Democrat William Aiken, Jr.. In the Senate, the Democrats retained a strong majority, while the Opposition replaced the Whigs as the second largest party in the chamber.

== See also ==
- 1854–55 United States House of Representatives elections
- 1854–55 United States Senate elections
