= 1840 Connecticut gubernatorial election =

- April 6, 1840
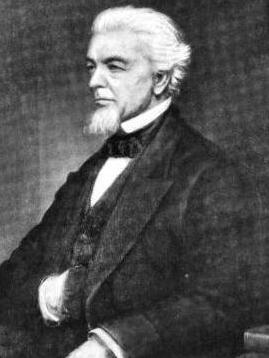

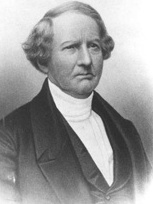
Nominee	William W. Ellsworth	John M. Niles
Party	Whig	Democratic
Popular vote	29,870	25,270
Percentage	54.17%	45.83%
- Ellsworth: 50–60% 60–70% 70–80% 80–90% Niles: 50–60% 60–70% 70–80% Tie: 40–50% No Vote/Data
Governor before election
William W. Ellsworth
Whig
Elected Governor
William W. Ellsworth
Whig

The 1840 Connecticut gubernatorial election was held on April 6, 1840. It was a rematch of the 1839 Connecticut gubernatorial election. Incumbent governor and Whig nominee William W. Ellsworth was re-elected, defeating former senator and Democratic nominee John M. Niles with 54.17% of the vote.

After his loss, Niles would be appointed Postmaster General by President Martin Van Buren, serving from May 19, 1840, until the end of Van Buren's term, March 4, 1841.

== General election ==
=== Candidates ===
Major party candidates

- William W. Ellsworth, Whig
- John M. Niles, Democratic

=== Results ===
1840 Connecticut gubernatorial election
Party	Candidate	Votes	%	±%
Whig	William W. Ellsworth (incumbent)	29,870	54.17%	
Democratic	John M. Niles	25,270	45.83%	
Majority		4,600		
Turnout				
Whig hold		Swing		
