= John Milton Niles =

American politician

John M. Niles
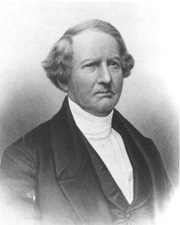

United States Senator from Connecticut
- In office March 4, 1843 – March 3, 1849
- Preceded by: Perry Smith
- Succeeded by: Truman Smith
- In office December 21, 1835 – March 3, 1839
- Preceded by: Nathan Smith
- Succeeded by: Thaddeus Betts

9th United States Postmaster General
- In office May 19, 1840 – March 4, 1841
- President: Martin Van Buren
- Preceded by: Amos Kendall
- Succeeded by: Francis Granger

Personal details
- Born: John Milton Niles; August 20, 1787 Windsor, Connecticut, U.S.
- Died: May 31, 1856 (aged 68) Hartford, Connecticut, U.S.
- Party: Democratic-Republican (Before 1825); Democratic (1828– 1848); Free Soil (1848–1854); Republican (1854–1856)
- Spouse(s): Sarah Robinson; Jane Pratt

John Milton Niles (August 20, 1787 – May 31, 1856) was a lawyer, editor, author and politician from Connecticut, serving in the United States Senate and as United States Postmaster General 1840 to 1841.

== Biography ==
Born in Windsor, Connecticut, Niles received a common school education and studied law. He was admitted to the bar in 1817 and practiced in Hartford, Connecticut. There, he also established a newspaper, the "Hartford Weekly Times", in 1817, where he worked as an editor as well as a contributor for over thirty years. He published two other papers, the Gazatteer of Connecticut and Rhode Island, and The Independent Whig. He married Sarah Robinson on June 17, 1824. After her death on November 23, 1824, he married Jane Pratt on November 26, 1845.

== Career ==
Niles became active in Democratic Party politics and a supporter of states-rights doctrines. In 1820 he was appointed an associate judge in the Hartford County Court, but didn't start until 1821. He served until 1826 when he was elected to the Connecticut House of Representatives. Unsuccessful for reelection, he continued practicing law. In 1829 he was appointed Postmaster of Hartford, serving this position until 1836. He failed to be elected to an at-large Connecticut Representative seat.

After the demise of Whig senator Nathan Smith, Niles was elected as a class one senator to fill his seat, serving from 1835 to 1839. There, he served as chairman of the Committee on Manufactures in the 24th and 25th congresses. He was not a candidate for reelection. In 1839 and in 1840 he was the unsuccessful Democratic candidate for Governor of Connecticut, losing to William W. Ellsworth.

Appointed United States Postmaster General by President Martin Van Buren in 1840, Niles served until the end of the administration in 1841. As Postmaster General he ended delivery of mail on Sunday. He returned to the Senate as a class three senator in 1844. He was actually elected in 1842 and was to start in 1843, but ill health and a credentials challenge kept him out until the next year. When he was a US Senator, in 1845, he cast the deciding vote admitting Texas to the Union as a slave state, though he was against slavery. He served from March 4, 1843, to March 3, 1849, and declined for reelection. Associating with the Free Soil Party campaign of his friend Van Buren in 1848, he became their candidate for governor in 1849. He spent some time in Europe from 1851 to 1852.

== Death ==
In his later years, Niles pursued horticulture. He had no children and bequeathed his library to the Connecticut Historical Society and left $70,000 in trust to the city of Hartford as a charity fund, the income of which he directed to be annually distributed to the poor. He was Connecticut's member on the original Republican National Committee in February 1856.

Niles died in Hartford on May 30, 1856, at the age of 68 and is interred in the city's Old North Cemetery

== Published works ==
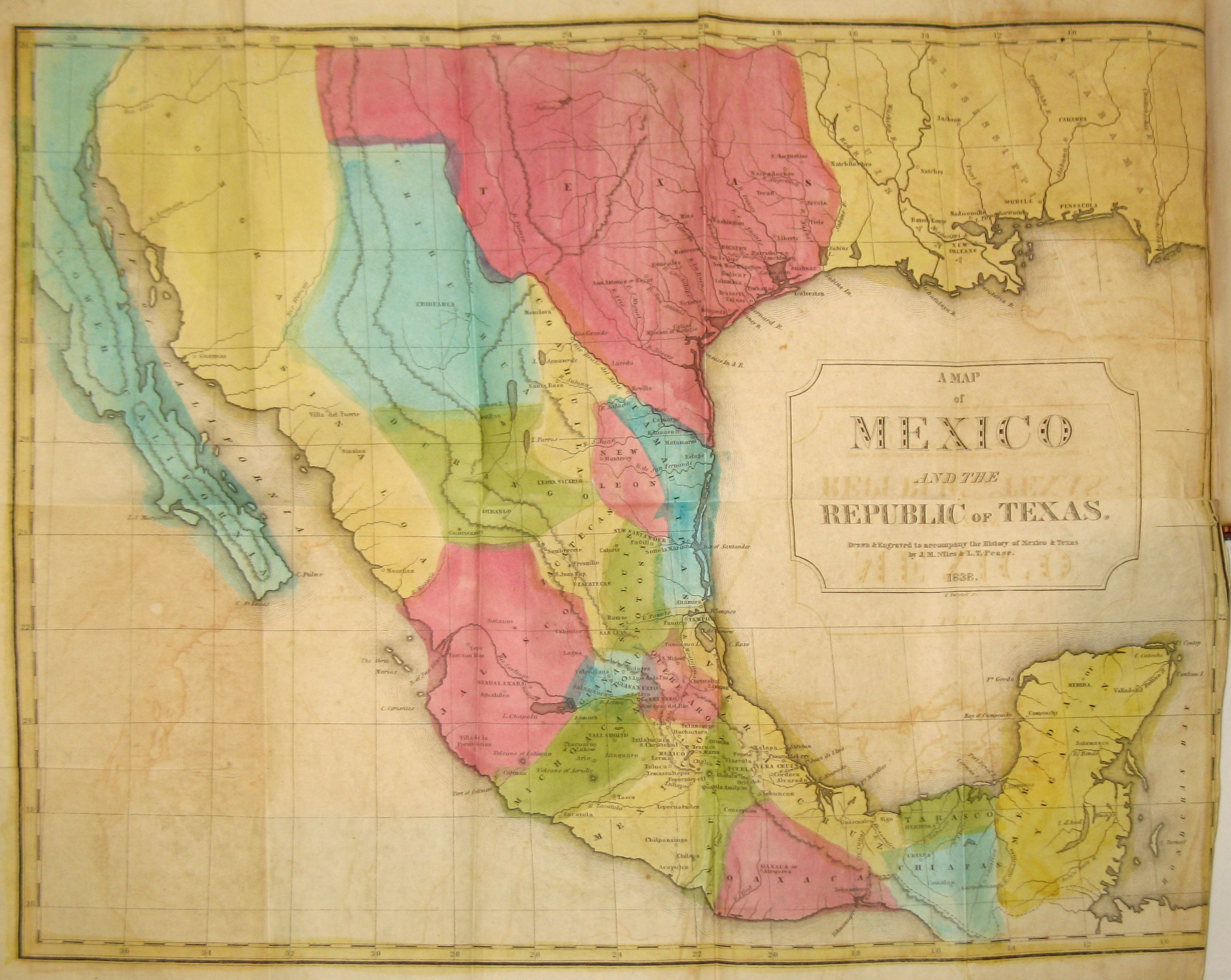
Niles' Map of Mexico and the Republic of Texas, 1838

- The Life of Oliver Hazard Perry (1820)
- The Connecticut Civil Officer (1823)
- A View of South America and Mexico, Comprising Their History, the Political Condition, Geography, Agriculture, Commerce, & c. of the Republics of Mexico, Guatemala, Colombia, Peru, the United Provinces of South America and Chile, with a Complete History of the Revolution, in Each of These Independent States (two volumes, 1826)
- History of South America and Mexico: Comprising Their Discovery, Geography, Politics, Commerce and Revolutions (two volumes, 1838)

U.S. Senate
Preceded by Nathan Smith	U.S. Senator (Class 1) from Connecticut; 1835–1839; Served alongside: Gideon Tomlinson, Perry Smith	Succeeded by Thaddeus Betts
Preceded by Perry Smith	U.S. Senator (Class 3) from Connecticut; 1843–1849; Served alongside: Jabez W. Huntington, Roger Baldwin	Succeeded by Truman Smith
Preceded by William Duhurst Merrick	Chair of the Senate Post Office Committee; 1845–1849	Succeeded by Thomas Jefferson Rusk
Party political offices
Preceded by Seth P. Beers	Democratic nominee for Governor of Connecticut; 1839, 1840	Succeeded by Francis H. Nicoll
First	Free Soil nominee for Governor of Connecticut; 1849	Succeeded by John Boyd
Political offices
Preceded by Amos Kendall	United States Postmaster General; 1840–1841	Succeeded by Francis Granger
