= 1851 Connecticut gubernatorial election =

- April 7, 1851
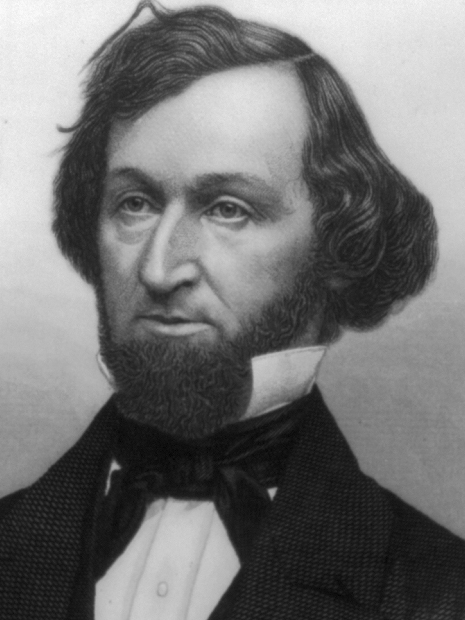

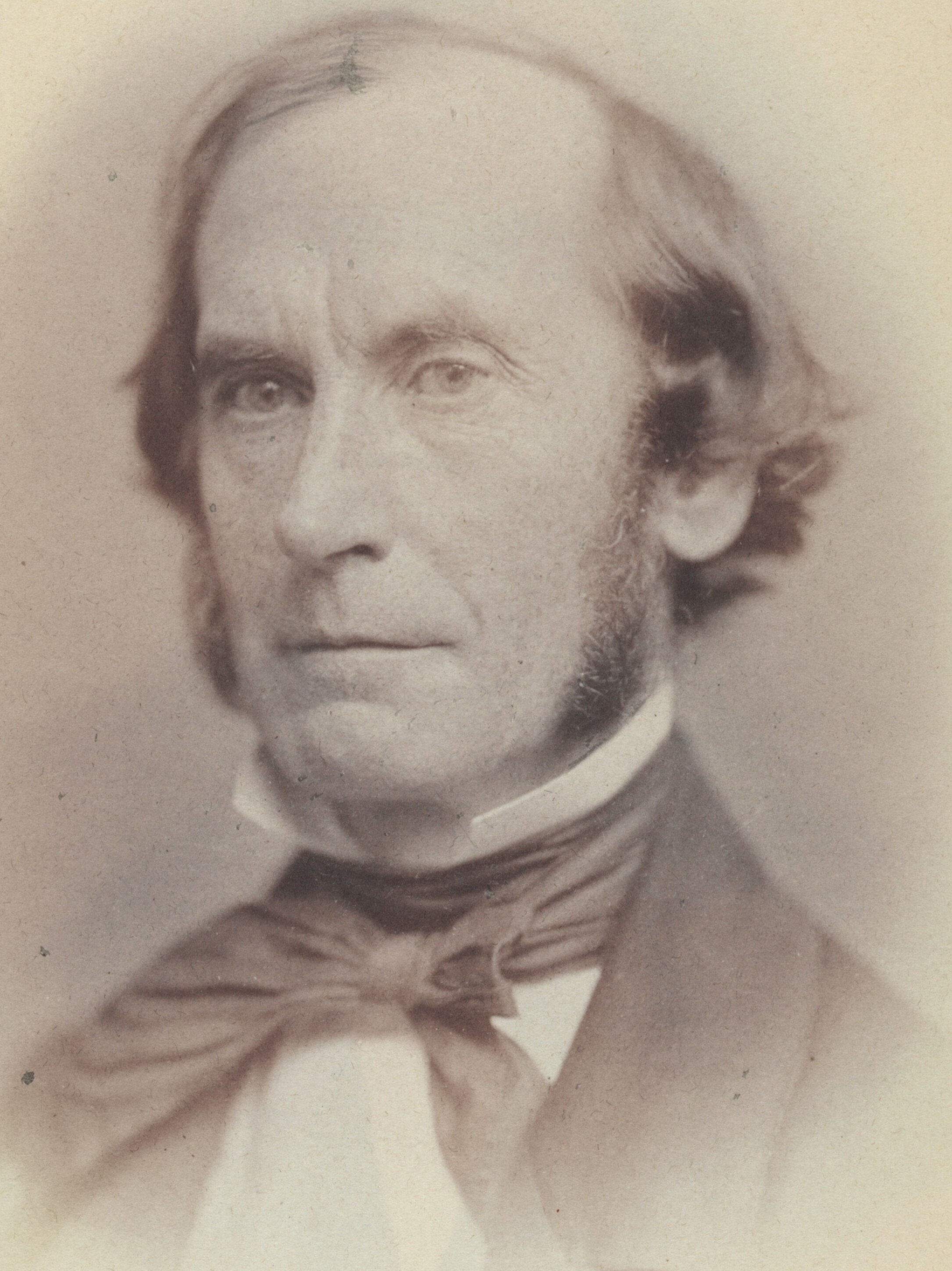
Nominee	Thomas H. Seymour	Lafayette S. Foster
Party	Democratic	Whig
Electoral vote	122	121
Popular vote	30,077	28,856
Percentage	48.94%	46.95%
- Seymour: 40–50% 50–60% 60–70% 70–80% Foster: 40–50% 50–60% 60–70% 70–80%
Governor before election
Thomas H. Seymour
Democratic
Elected Governor
Thomas H. Seymour
Democratic

The 1851 Connecticut gubernatorial election was held on April 7, 1851. It was a rematch of the 1850 Connecticut gubernatorial election. Incumbent governor and Democratic Party nominee Thomas H. Seymour defeated former state legislator and Whig nominee Lafayette S. Foster with 48.94% of the vote.

Seymour won a plurality of the vote, but he did not receive a majority. As a result, the Connecticut General Assembly elected the governor, per the state constitution. The Whig Party had a majority in the Connecticut State house, but they were divided over their choice. Seymour won the vote over Foster by a mere one-vote margin, 122 to 121, in the General Assembly, and became the governor.

== General election ==
=== Candidates ===
Major party candidates

- Thomas H. Seymour, Democratic
- Lafayette S. Foster, Whig

Minor party candidates

- John Boyd, Free Soil

=== Results ===
1851 Connecticut gubernatorial election
Party	Candidate	Votes	%	±%
Democratic	Thomas H. Seymour (incumbent)	30,077	48.94%	
Whig	Lafayette S. Foster	28,856	46.95%	
Free Soil	John Boyd	2,530	4.12%	
Plurality		1,221		
Turnout				

1851 Connecticut gubernatorial election, contingent General Assembly election
Party	Candidate	Votes	%	±%
Democratic	Thomas H. Seymour (incumbent)	122	50.21%	
Whig	Lafayette S. Foster	121	49.79%	
Majority		1		
Democratic hold		Swing		
