= Perry Smith (politician) =

American politician (1783–1852)

United States Senator from Connecticut
- In office March 4, 1837 – March 3, 1843
- Preceded by: Gideon Tomlinson
- Succeeded by: John Milton Niles

Member of the Connecticut House of Representatives
- In office 1822–1823; 1835–1836

Personal details
- Born: May 12, 1783 Woodbury, Connecticut
- Died: June 8, 1852 (aged 69) New Milford, Connecticut
- Party: Democratic
- Spouse: Anne Comstock Smith
- Education: Litchfield Law School
- Occupation: Lawyer

Perry Smith (May 12, 1783 – June 8, 1852) was a Connecticut lawyer and politician. He served in the Connecticut House of Representatives (1822–1823, 1835–1836) and United States Senate (1837–1843).

== Biography ==
Smith was born in Woodbury, Litchfield County, Connecticut, on May 12, 1783, the son of John and Abigail (Lambert) Smith. He completed preparatory studies; studied law at the Litchfield Law School in 1807; was admitted to the bar and commenced the practice of law in New Milford. He married Anne Comstock who died on February 26, 1826.

== Career ==
A member of Connecticut House of Representatives from New Milford from 1822 to 1823, Smith was made postmaster of New Milford and held that post from 1829 to 1837. He was again a state representative from 1835 to 1836, as well as judge of probate court from 1833 to 1835.

Elected as a Democrat to the United States Senate from Connecticut, Smith served from March 4, 1837 to March 3, 1843. He was chairman of the Committee on Agriculture (Twenty-fifth Congress); and was a member of the Committee on Revolutionary Claims (Twenty-sixth Congress).

== Death ==
Smith died in New Milford on June 8, 1852 (age 69 years, 27 days). He is interred at New Milford Center Cemetery, New Milford, Connecticut.

U.S. Senate
Preceded by Gideon Tomlinson	U.S. senator (Class 3) from Connecticut; 1837–1843; Served alongside: John M. Niles, Thaddeus Betts, Jabez W. Huntington	Succeeded by John M. Niles
