= 1850 Connecticut gubernatorial election =

- April 1, 1850
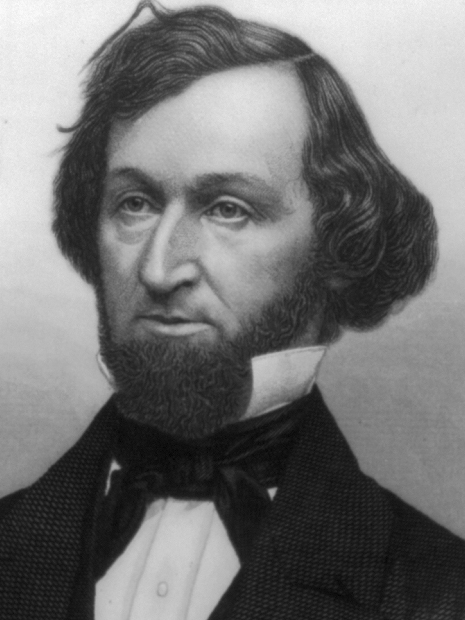

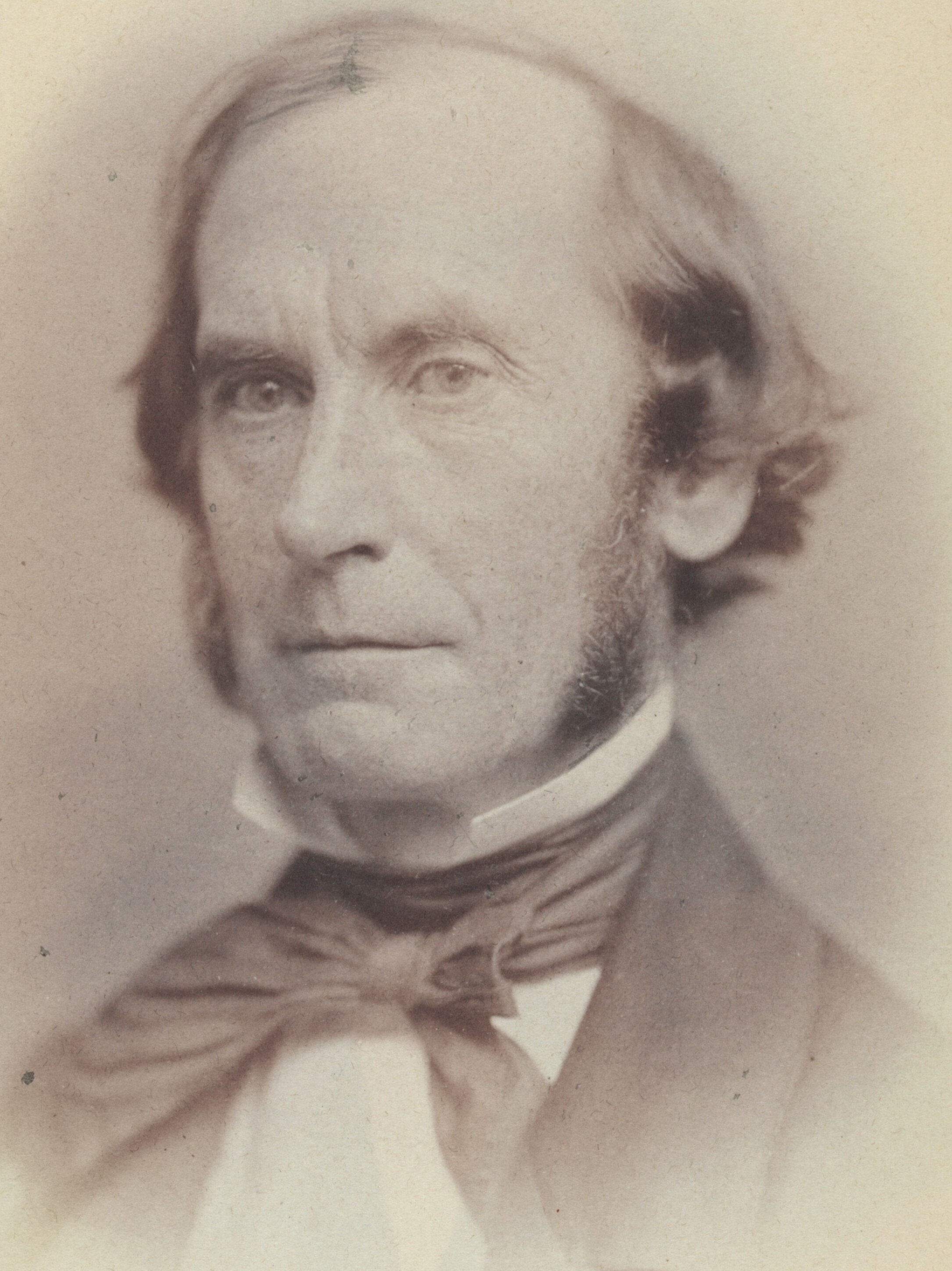
Nominee	Thomas H. Seymour	Lafayette S. Foster
Party	Democratic	Whig
Electoral vote	122	108
Popular vote	28,428	27,780
Percentage	48.11%	47.02%
- Seymour: 40–50% 50–60% 60–70% 70–80% Foster: 40–50% 50–60% 60–70% 70–80%
Governor before election
Joseph Trumbull
Whig
Elected Governor
Thomas H. Seymour
Democratic

The 1850 Connecticut gubernatorial election was held on April 1, 1850. Former congressman and Democratic Party nominee Thomas H. Seymour defeated former state legislator and Whig nominee Lafayette S. Foster with 48.11% of the vote.

Seymour won a plurality of the vote, but he did not receive a majority. As a result, the Connecticut General Assembly elected the governor, per the state constitution. Seymour won the vote over Foster 122 to 108 in the General Assembly, and became the governor. The constitutional inauguration date was May 1, and Seymour was inaugurated on May 4, possibly due to delays over the state legislature vote.

== General election ==
=== Candidates ===
Major party candidates

- Thomas H. Seymour, Democratic
- Lafayette S. Foster, Whig

Minor party candidates

- John Boyd, Free Soil

=== Results ===
1851 Connecticut gubernatorial election
Party	Candidate	Votes	%	±%
Democratic	Thomas H. Seymour	28,428	48.11%	
Whig	Lafayette S. Foster	27,780	47.02%	
Free Soil	John Boyd	2,877	4.87%	
Plurality		648		
Turnout				

1850 Connecticut gubernatorial election, contingent General Assembly election
Party	Candidate	Votes	%	±%
Democratic	Thomas H. Seymour	122	53.04%	
Whig	Lafayette S. Foster	108	46.96%	
Majority		14		
Democratic gain from Whig		Swing		
