= 1852 Connecticut gubernatorial election =

- April 5, 1852
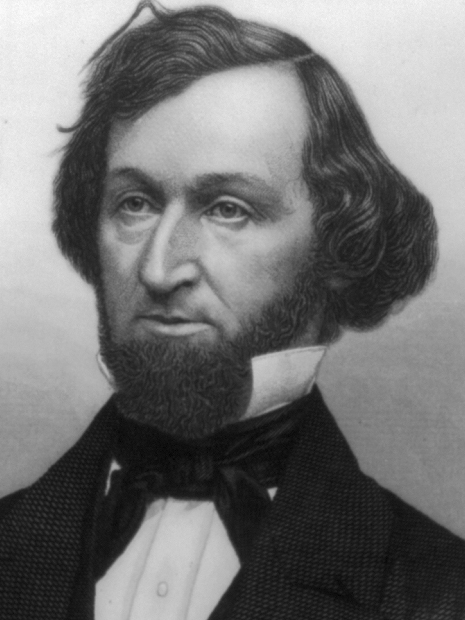

Nominee	Thomas H. Seymour	Green Kendrick
Party	Democratic	Whig
Popular vote	31,624	28,241
Percentage	50.39%	44.99%
- Seymour: 40–50% 50–60% 60–70% 70–80% Kendrick: 40–50% 50–60% 60–70% 70–80% Tie: 40–50%
Governor before election
Thomas H. Seymour
Democratic
Elected Governor
Thomas H. Seymour
Democratic

The 1852 Connecticut gubernatorial election was held on April 5, 1852. Incumbent governor and Democratic Party nominee Thomas H. Seymour defeated incumbent Lieutenant Governor and Whig nominee Green Kendrick with 50.39% of the vote.

== General election ==
=== Candidates ===
Major party candidates

- Thomas H. Seymour, Democratic
- Green Kendrick, Whig

Minor party candidates

- Francis Gillette, Free Soil

=== Results ===
1852 Connecticut gubernatorial election
Party	Candidate	Votes	%	±%
Democratic	Thomas H. Seymour (incumbent)	31,624	50.39%	
Whig	Green Kendrick	28,241	44.99%	
Free Soil	Francis Gillette	2,900	4.62%	
Majority		3,383		
Turnout				
Democratic hold		Swing		
