= Orville H. Platt =

American politician (1827–1905)

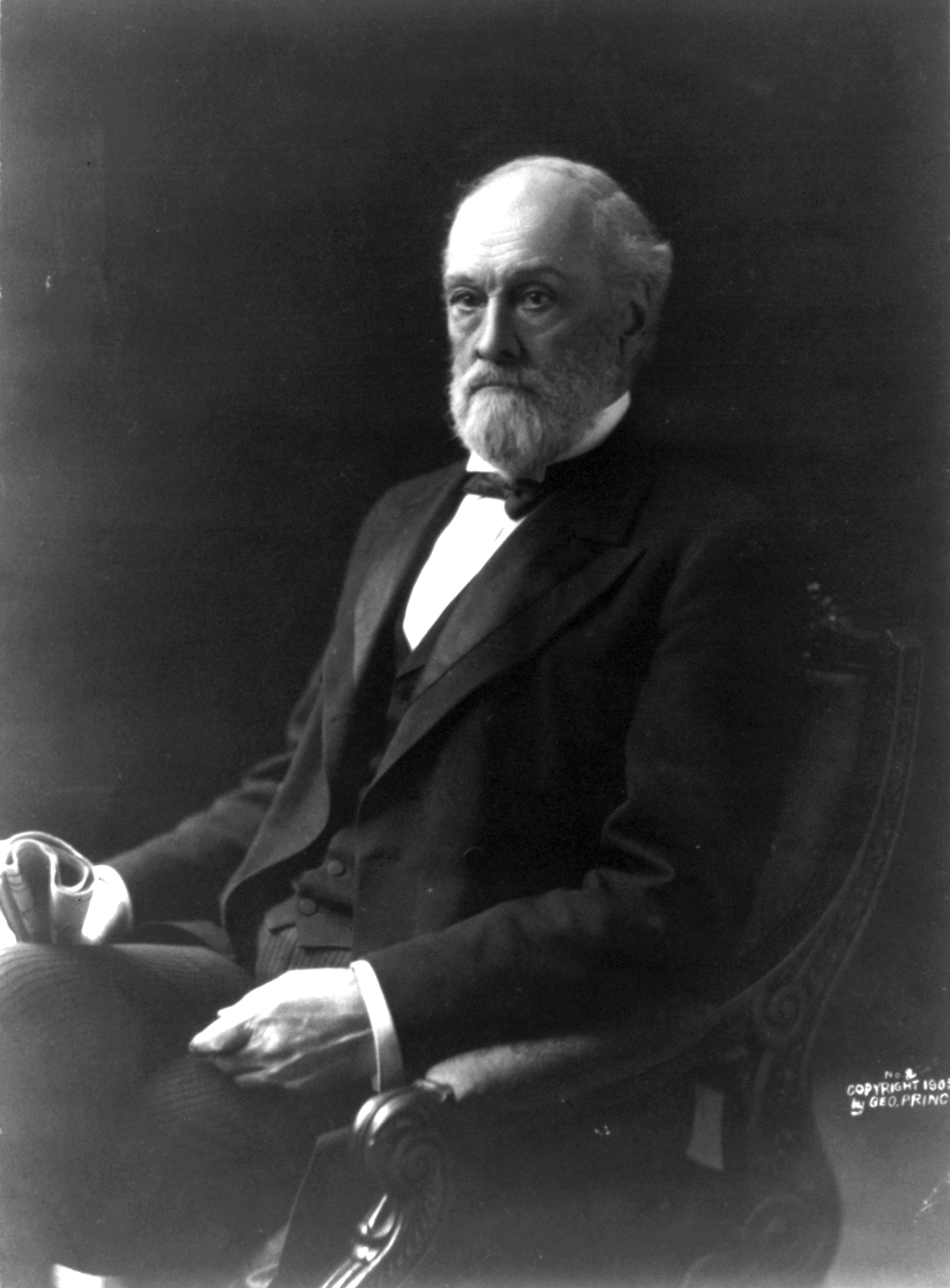
- Platt, c. 1902

United States Senator from Connecticut
- In office March 4, 1879 – April 21, 1905
- Preceded by: William H. Barnum
- Succeeded by: Frank B. Brandegee

Secretary of State of Connecticut
- In office 1857–1858
- Governor: James Pollock
- Preceded by: Nehemiah D. Sperry
- Succeeded by: John Boyd

Member of the Connecticut House of Representatives
- In office 1864; 1869

Personal details
- Born: Orville Hitchcock Platt; July 19, 1827 Washington, Connecticut
- Died: April 21, 1905 (aged 77) Washington, Connecticut
- Party: Republican

Orville Hitchcock Platt (July 19, 1827 – April 21, 1905) was a United States senator from Connecticut. Platt was a prominent conservative Republican and by the 1890s he became one of the "big four" key Republicans who largely controlled the major decisions of the Senate, along with William B. Allison of Iowa, John Coit Spooner of Wisconsin and Nelson W. Aldrich of Rhode Island.

== Early life ==
Born in Washington, Connecticut, he attended the common schools and graduated from The Gunnery in Washington. He studied law in Litchfield, and was admitted to the bar in 1850, commencing practice in Towanda, Pennsylvania. He moved to Meriden, Connecticut in 1850 and continued to practice law.

He later had a son, named James Perry Platt, who became Judge of the United States District Court.

== Political career ==
He was clerk of the Connecticut Senate in 1855 and 1856, Secretary of the State of Connecticut in 1857, and a member of the State senate in 1861 and 1862. He was a member of the Connecticut House of Representatives in 1864 and 1869, and served as speaker in the latter year. The former Platt National Park in Oklahoma (since 1976 part of the Chickasaw National Recreational Area) was named for him.

Platt was state's attorney for New Haven County from 1877 to 1879 and was elected as a Republican to the U.S. Senate in 1879. He was re-elected in 1885, 1891, 1897 and 1903 and served from March 4, 1879 to his death.

He was chairman of the Committee on Patents (Forty-seventh through Forty-ninth and Fifty-fourth and Fifty-fifth Congresses) and a member of the Committees on Pensions (Forty-seventh Congress), Territories (Fiftieth through Fifty-second Congresses), Cuban Relations (Fifty-sixth through Fifty-eighth Congresses), and the Judiciary (Fifty-eighth and Fifty-ninth Congresses). By the 1890s, Platt's influence in the Senate swelled to the point that eventually he was one of the "Senate Four" who largely controlled the Senate, along with John Coit Spooner, William B. Allison and Nelson W. Aldrich. Because of his votes against the Sherman Anti-trust Law, the Eight-Hour Labor Act, and the Anti-Injunction Bill, Platt was denounced by the labor organizations and was considered a reactionary. He was an earnest advocate of the abolition of secret executive sessions of the Senate.

In the U.S. Senate, Platt presided over the impeachment trial of Judge Charles Swayne, which was held in late 1904 and early 1905.

On March 1, 1901, the U.S. House of Representatives passed the Army Appropriation bill with the Platt Amendment as a rider, which governed U.S. relations with Cuba from 1901 to 1934 and was named for Platt.

Platt was a Compatriot of the Sons of the American Revolution.

== Platt National Park ==
In 1902, Platt introduced legislation to establish the 640-acre Sulphur Springs Reservation, protecting about 30 mineral springs, in Murray County, Oklahoma, (then part of Indian Territory). On June 29, 1906, Congress redesignated the reservation as Platt National Park, named for the senator. It remained one of the smallest national park in the United States until it was abolished by Congress and made part of the much larger Chickasaw National Recreation Area in 1976.

Yale gave him the degree of LL.D. in 1887. Platt died on April 21, 1905, aged 77, at his summer home, "Kirby Corners", in Washington, CT, and was interred in the Cemetery on the Green in the same town. One of the two public high schools in Meriden was named for Platt when it opened in 1958.

== See also ==
- List of members of the United States Congress who died in office (1900–1949)

== Sources ==
- L. A. Coolidge, An Old-Fashioned Senator: Orville H. Platt (New York, 1910)
- United States Congress. "Orville H. Platt (id: P000382)". Biographical Directory of the United States Congress.

U.S. Senate
Preceded by William H. Barnum	U.S. senator (Class 3) from Connecticut; 1879–1905; Served alongside: William W. Eaton, Joseph R. Hawley, Morgan G. Bulkeley	Succeeded by Frank B. Brandegee
Political offices
Preceded by George F. Hoar	Chairman of the Senate Judiciary Committee; 1904–1905	Succeeded by Clarence D. Clark
