= 1853 Mexican presidential election =

← 1851	April 1853	1857 →
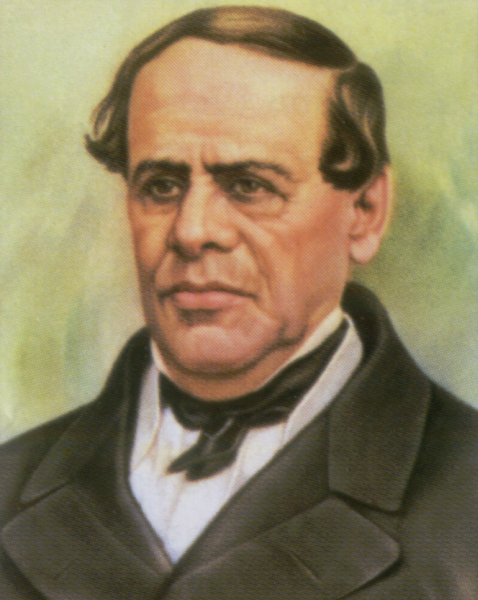
Nominee	Antonio López de Santa Anna
Elected	By decree
President before election
Manuel María Lombardini
Elected President
Antonio López de Santa Anna

Presidential elections were held in Mexico in April 1853, following the resignation of Mariano Arista on January 5. The country experienced profound political polarization between liberal and conservative factions, alongside economic and military instability as a result of the Mexican-American War.

The Plan of Hospicio issued by conservative factions, called for the return of Antonio López de Santa Anna, leading to his presidency in April 1853. This was seen as a transfer of power through the decree rather than a formal election.

== Background ==
=== Political instability and interim presidencies ===
In 1853, Mexico was facing political and military instability due to ongoing economic and military challenges, exacerbated by the Mexican-American War and political tensions between conservatives and liberals. Mariano Arista resigned on January 5 due to his failure to address these issues, and the Supreme Court appointed Juan Bautista Ceballos as interim president. However, Ceballos’ term lasted only from January 5 to February 8 due to his inability to resolve the crises, leading to his resignation. Manuel María Lombardini succeeded Ceballos as interim president from February 8 to April 20, 1853. Lombardini, like his predecessor, struggled with unrest, particularly from military factions and conservatives, and resigned after his failure to restore stability.

=== Santa Anna's return to the presidency ===
Antonio López de Santa Anna eventually returned to power through the Plan of Hospicio, a political maneuver supported by conservative factions and military leaders. His return was facilitated by a decree, not a formal election. The number of votes in favor of the plan is unknown, as there was no formal voting process. As a result, Santa Anna's return was more a political arrangement than a democratic election.
