= John Baldwin (Connecticut politician) =

American politician (1772–1850)

Member of the U.S. House of Representatives from Connecticut's at-large district
- In office March 4, 1825 – March 3, 1829
- Preceded by: Ansel Sterling
- Succeeded by: Jabez W. Huntington

Personal details
- Born: April 5, 1772 Mansfield, Connecticut Colony, British America
- Died: March 27, 1850 (aged 77) Windham, Connecticut, U.S.
- Resting place: Windham Cemetery

John Baldwin (April 5, 1772 – March 27, 1850) was a U.S. Representative from Connecticut.

Born in Mansfield in the Connecticut Colony, Baldwin attended the common schools. He studied law at Brown University, Providence, Rhode Island, and graduated in 1797. John was admitted to the bar in 1800 and commenced practice in Windham, Connecticut, serving as probate judge of Windham County from 1818 to 1824.

John Baldwin was elected as an Adams to the Nineteenth and Twentieth Congresses (March 4, 1825 – March 3, 1829), and was affiliated with the Whig Party after its formation. After leaving Congress, John resumed the practice of law in Connecticut. He died in Windham, Connecticut, March 27, 1850, and was interred in Windham Cemetery.

U.S. House of Representatives
Preceded by Ansel Sterling	Member of the U.S. House of Representatives from Connecticut's at-large congressional district 1825-1829	Succeeded by Jabez W. Huntington
