= James Dixon =

American politician

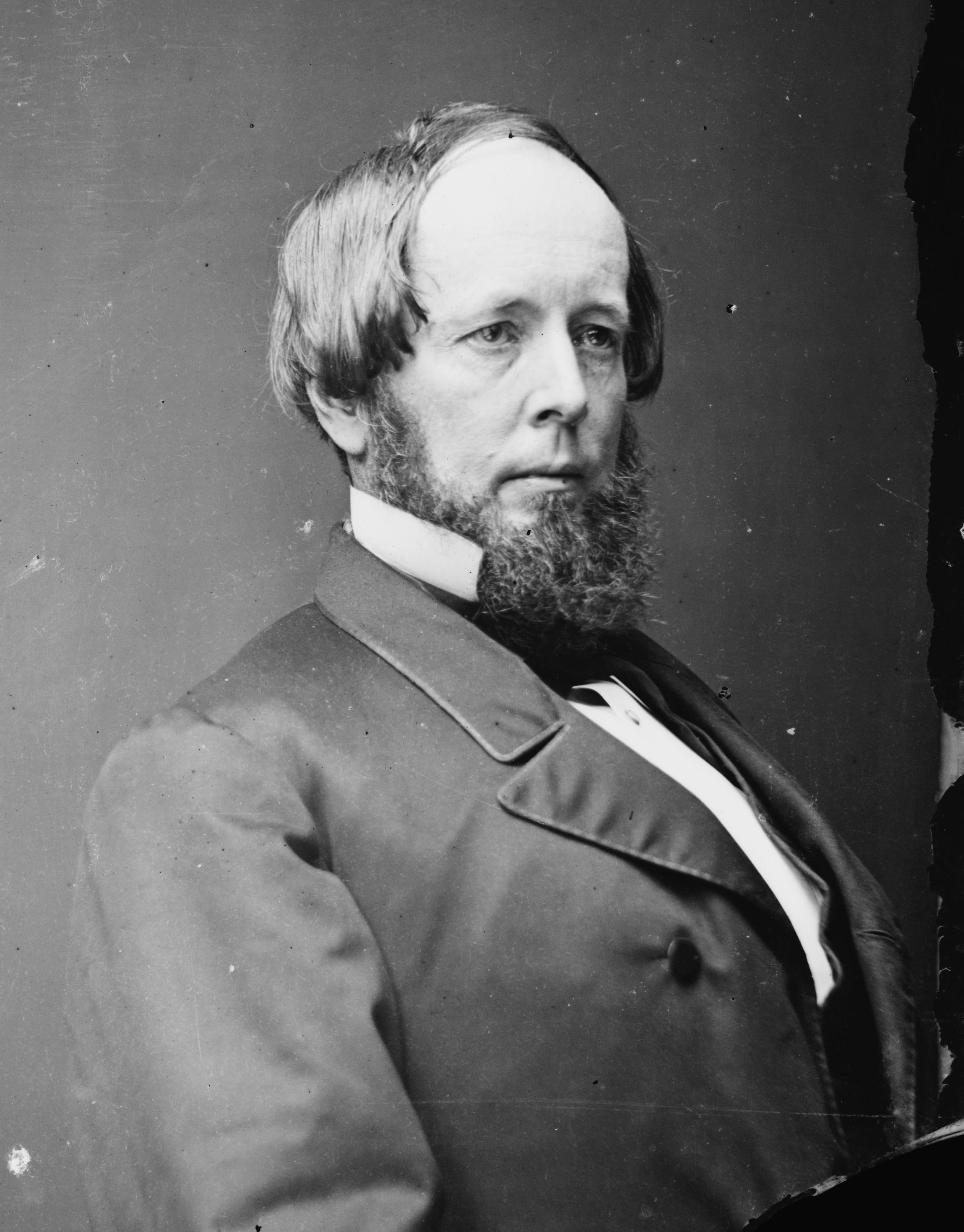

United States Senator from Connecticut
- In office March 4, 1857 – March 3, 1869
- Preceded by: Isaac Toucey
- Succeeded by: William A. Buckingham

Member of the U.S. House of Representatives from Connecticut's 1st district
- In office March 4, 1845 – March 3, 1849
- Preceded by: Thomas H. Seymour
- Succeeded by: Loren P. Waldo

Member of the Connecticut House of Representatives
- In office 1837-1838; 1844

Personal details
- Born: August 5, 1814 Enfield, Connecticut, US
- Died: March 27, 1873 (aged 58) Hartford, Connecticut, US
- Party: Whig, Republican, Democrat
- Spouse: Elizabeth Lord Cogswell Dixon (1820 - 1871)
- Children: Elizabeth L Dixon (1841 - 1931) Clementine Dixon Welling (1843 - 1921) James Wyllys Dixon (1846 - 1917) Henry Whitfield Dixon (1850 - 1932).
- Education: Williams College
- Profession: Politician, Lawyer

James Dixon (August 5, 1814 – March 27, 1873) was a United States representative and Senator from Connecticut.

== Biography ==
Dixon was son of William Dixon and his wife Mary (Field) Dixon. James Dixon was born on August 5, 1814, in Enfield, Connecticut. Dixon pursued preparatory studies, and graduated from Williams College in Williamstown, Massachusetts, in 1834, where he had been a charter member of Kappa Alpha Society. He was elected to Phi Beta Kappa. He studied law, and was admitted to the bar in 1834 and commenced practice in Enfield.

== Career ==
Dixon was a member of the Connecticut House of Representatives in 1837–1838 and 1844, and served as speaker in 1837; he moved to Hartford, Connecticut, in 1839 and continued the practice of law. He married Elizabeth Lord Cogswell on October 1, 1840. They had two sons, James Wyllys Dixon and Henry Whitfield Dixon, and two daughters, Elizabeth L. Dixon and Clementine Lydia Dixon. Clementine was courted (unsuccessfully) by the paleontologist, Othniel Charles Marsh. She married Dr. James Clarke Welling.

Dixon was elected as a representative of Connecticut's 1st District, as a Whig to the House, serving during the Twenty-ninth and Thirtieth Congresses (March 4, 1845 – March 3, 1849). He served two one-year terms in the Connecticut State Senate from 1849 to 1850 and 1854–1855, representing the 1st District which included Hartford and the surrounding area. During his second term, he served on the federal relations committee. He declined the nomination for governor of Connecticut in 1854, and was an unsuccessful candidate for United States Senator in 1854.

Dixon was elected as a Republican to the U.S. Senate in 1856, and reelected in 1863, serving from March 4, 1857, to March 3, 1869.

On December 16, 1861, Lyman Trumbull asked the Senate to consider his resolution: "That the Secretary of State be directed to inform the Senate whether, in the loyal States of the Union, any person or persons have been arrested and imprisoned and are now held in confinement by orders from him or his Department; and if so, under what law said arrests have been made, and said persons imprisoned." Dixon, supporting repression, said of the resolution: "it seems to me calculated to produce nothing but mischief".

While in the Senate, he was chairman of the committee to Audit and Control the Contingent Expenses (Thirty-seventh and Thirty-eighth Congresses) and a member of the Committees on District of Columbia (Thirty-eighth and Thirty-ninth Congresses) and Post Office and Post Roads (Thirty-ninth Congress). He supported Horatio Seymour in the 1868 United States Presidential Election and was an unsuccessful Democratic candidate for the U.S. Senate and the House of Representatives in 1868, primarily because he had been the first Republican member of the Senate to oppose the impeachment of President Andrew Johnson. He was also one of 13 senators, and one of five Republican senators, to oppose the Fifteenth Amendment to the United States Constitution.

== Death ==
Appointed Minister to Russia in 1869, Dixon declined and engaged in literary pursuits and extensive traveling until his death in Hartford on March 27, 1873. He is interred in Cedar Hill Cemetery.

U.S. House of Representatives
Preceded by Thomas H. Seymour	Member of the U.S. House of Representatives from Connecticut's 1st congressional district March 4, 1845 – March 3, 1849	Succeeded by Loren P. Waldo
U.S. Senate
Preceded by Isaac Toucey	U.S. senator (Class 1) from Connecticut; March 4, 1857 – March 3, 1869; Served alongside: Lafayette S. Foster and Orris S. Ferry	Succeeded by William A. Buckingham
