= Phineas Miner =

American politician from Connecticut (1777–1839)

Phineas Miner (November 27, 1777 – September 15, 1839) was a United States representative from Connecticut. He was born in Winchester, Connecticut where he completed preparatory studies. Later, he studied law and was admitted to the bar in 1797. He commenced his practice in Winchester.

Miner was elected justice of the peace in 1809. He was a member of the Connecticut House of Representatives in 1809, 1811, 1813, 1814, and 1816. He moved to Litchfield, Connecticut in 1816 where he was again a member of the House of Representatives in 1823, 1827, and 1829. He also served in the Connecticut Senate in 1830 and 1831. Miner was elected as an Anti-Jacksonian to the Twenty-third Congress to fill the vacancy caused by the resignation of Jabez W. Huntington and served from December 1, 1834, to March 3, 1835. After leaving Congress, he resumed the practice of law and again served in the Connecticut House of Representatives in 1835. He was elected a judge of the probate court for Litchfield district in 1838.

Miner died in Litchfield, Connecticut on September 15, 1839, and was buried in the East Burying Ground.

U.S. House of Representatives
Preceded by Jabez W. Huntington	Member of the U.S. House of Representatives from Connecticut's at-large congressional district 1834–1835	Succeeded by Samuel Ingham
