= 1849 Connecticut gubernatorial election =

- April 2, 1849
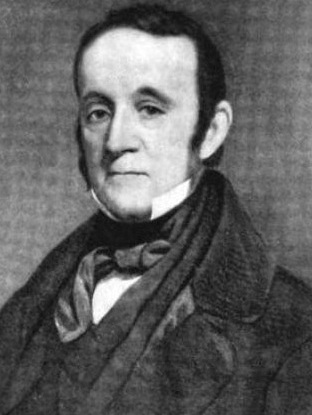

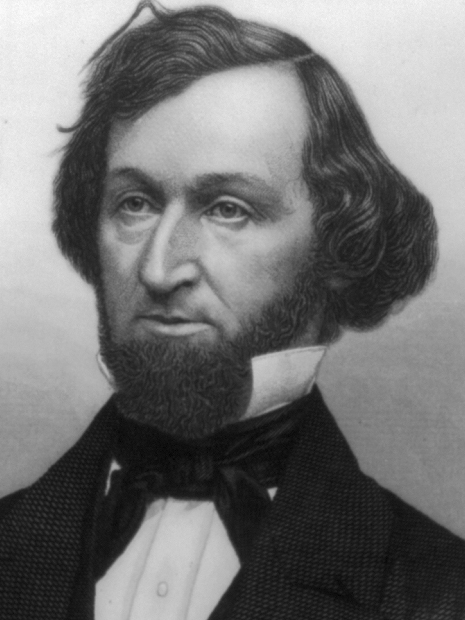

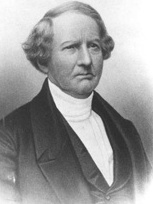
Nominee	Joseph Trumbull	Thomas H. Seymour	John M. Niles
Party	Whig	Democratic	Free Soil
Electoral vote	122	110
Popular vote	27,800	25,018	3,520
Percentage	49.35%	44.41%	6.25%
- Trumbull: 30–40% 40–50% 50–60% 60–70% 70–80% Seymour: 30–40% 40–50% 50–60% 60–70% 70–80% Tie: 40–50%
Governor before election
Clark Bissell
Whig
Elected Governor
Joseph Trumbull
Whig

The 1849 Connecticut gubernatorial election was held on April 2, 1849. Former congressman and Whig nominee Joseph Trumbull defeated former congressman and Democratic nominee Thomas H. Seymour as well as former Senator and Free Soil nominee John M. Niles with 49.35% of the vote. Niles had previously been the Democratic nominee for this same office in 1840.

Trumbull won a plurality of the vote, but fell short of a majority. As a result, the Connecticut General Assembly elected the governor, per the state constitution. Trumbull won the vote over Seymour 122 to 110 in the General Assembly, and became the governor. This was the first of six consecutive elections in which the Free Soil Party participated.

== General election ==
=== Candidates ===
Major party candidates

- Joseph Trumbull, Whig
- Thomas H. Seymour, Democratic

Minor party candidates

- John M. Niles, Free Soil

=== Results ===
1849 Connecticut gubernatorial election
Party	Candidate	Votes	%	±%
Whig	Joseph Trumbull	27,800	49.35%	
Democratic	Thomas H. Seymour	25,018	44.41%	
Free Soil	John M. Niles	3,520	6.25%	
Plurality		2,782		
Turnout				

1849 Connecticut gubernatorial election, contingent General Assembly election
Party	Candidate	Votes	%	±%
Whig	Joseph Trumbull	122	52.59%	
Democratic	Thomas H. Seymour	110	47.41%	
Majority		12		
Whig hold		Swing		
