= Ansel Sterling =

American politician

Ansel Sterling (February 3, 1782 – November 6, 1853) was a United States representative from Connecticut. He was the brother of Micah Sterling who was a United States representative from New York. He was born in Lyme, Connecticut, where he attended the common schools. Later, he studied law and was admitted to the bar in 1805. He commenced practice in Salisbury before moving to Sharon in 1808 where he continued the practice of his profession.

Sterling was a member of the Connecticut House of Representatives in 1815, 1818–1821, 1825, 1826, 1829, and 1835–1837, and served as clerk of the house in the sessions of 1815 and 1818-1820. He was elected as a Democratic-Republican to the Seventeenth Congress and reelected as an Adams-Clay candidate to the Eighteenth Congress (March 4, 1821 – March 3, 1825). After leaving Congress, he resumed legal practice and was the chief justice of the court of common pleas of Litchfield County 1838-1840. He died in Sharon in 1853 and was buried in Sharon Burying Ground.

U.S. House of Representatives
Preceded by Jonathan O. Moseley	Member of the U.S. House of Representatives from Connecticut's at-large congressional district 1821-1825	Succeeded by John Baldwin
