= Jabez W. Huntington =

American politician

Jabez Williams Huntington
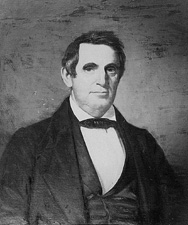

United States Senator from Connecticut
- In office May 4, 1840 – November 1, 1847
- Preceded by: Thaddeus Betts
- Succeeded by: Roger S. Baldwin

Member of the U.S. House of Representatives from Connecticut's at-large district
- In office March 4, 1829 – August 16, 1834
- Preceded by: John Baldwin
- Succeeded by: Phineas Miner

Member of the Connecticut House of Representatives
- In office 1828

Personal details
- Born: November 8, 1788 Norwich, Connecticut
- Died: November 1, 1847 (aged 58) Norwich, Connecticut
- Party: Whig
- Spouse: Sally Ann Huntington
- Occupation: Lawyer politician

Jabez Williams Huntington (November 8, 1788 – November 1, 1847) was a United States representative and senator from Connecticut.

== Biography ==
Born in Norwich, son of Zachariah Huntington and Hannah Mumford Huntington, Huntington pursued classical studies. He graduated from Yale College in 1806. Jabez taught in the Litchfield South Farms Academy for one year, and studied law at the Litchfield Law School during 1808. He was admitted to the bar in 1810 and commenced practice in Litchfield. He married Sally Ann Huntington, the youngest daughter of his first cousin Joseph Huntington, on May 22, 1833. They did not have any children.

== Career ==
Huntington was a member of the Connecticut House of Representatives from Litchfield in 1828. Elected to the U.S. House of Representatives in the Twenty-first, Twenty-second, and Twenty-third U.S. Congresses, He served from March 4, 1829, to August 16, 1834, when he resigned and moved to Norwich to accept the appointment of judge of the Connecticut Supreme Court of Errors. He held that office from 1834 to 1840.

In 1840 Huntington was elected as a Whig to the U.S. Senate to fill the vacancy caused by the death of Thaddeus Betts. He was reelected, and served from May 4, 1840, until his death. During the Twenty-seventh and Twenty-eight Congresses, he was chairman of the Committee on Commerce.

== Death ==
Huntington died in Norwich on November 1, 1847, a week shy of his 59th birthday. He is interred at the Old Norwich Town Cemetery.

== See also ==
- List of members of the United States Congress who died in office (1790–1899)

U.S. House of Representatives
Preceded by John Baldwin	Member of the U.S. House of Representatives from Connecticut's at-large congressional district 1829–1834	Succeeded by Phineas Miner
U.S. Senate
Preceded by Thaddeus Betts	U.S. senator (Class 1) from Connecticut; 1840–1847; Served alongside: Perry Smith, John M. Niles	Succeeded by Roger S. Baldwin
