= John Kendrick (Connecticut politician) =

American politician

Mayor of Waterbury, Connecticut
- In office June 8, 1868 – June 14, 1869
- Preceded by: L. Sanford Davies
- Succeeded by: Dr. Philo G. Rockwell

Personal details
- Born: May 27, 1825 Waterbury, Connecticut
- Died: May 27, 1877 (aged 52) Waterbury, Connecticut
- Party: Democratic
- Education: Yale College; Yale Law School

John Kendrick (May 27, 1825 – May 27, 1877) was an American politician.

Kendrick, the only son of the Hon. Green Kendrick (Lieutenant-Governor of Connecticut in 1851) and Anna M. (Leavenworth) Kendrick, was born in Charlotte, N. C., May 27, 1825. In 1829 his father removed from Charlotte to Waterbury, Conn.

He graduated from Yale College in 1843. After a short business experience in New York City, he studied law for a year with Norton J. Buel, Esq., of Waterbury, and for the next year at (1846-7) at the Yale Law School. He did not, however, practice his profession with any regularity until a few years before his death. His residence continued in Waterbury, with the exception of a brief period (about 1859) during which he was an assistant editor of the Daily Register in New Haven. He represented Waterbury several times in the Connecticut Legislature, was for three terms Mayor of the city of Waterbury, and through his life an active Democratic politician. In 1870 he was nominated for US Congress, but was not elected.

He died in Waterbury, May 27, 1877, being on that day 52 years of age. He had been confined to his house for several weeks by rheumatism, which so seriously affected the bones of one leg that an operation was performed and some pieces of the bone removed. Afterwards an artery in the leg burst, and he lived but a few hours.

In October, 1849, he was married to Marian Mair, of Waterbury, who survived him with two of their three children. One son graduated Yale in 1872.

His residence, the John Kendrick House, is now a historical site.

This article incorporates public domain material from the Yale Obituary Record.
