= 1851 California lieutenant gubernatorial election =

- September 3, 1851
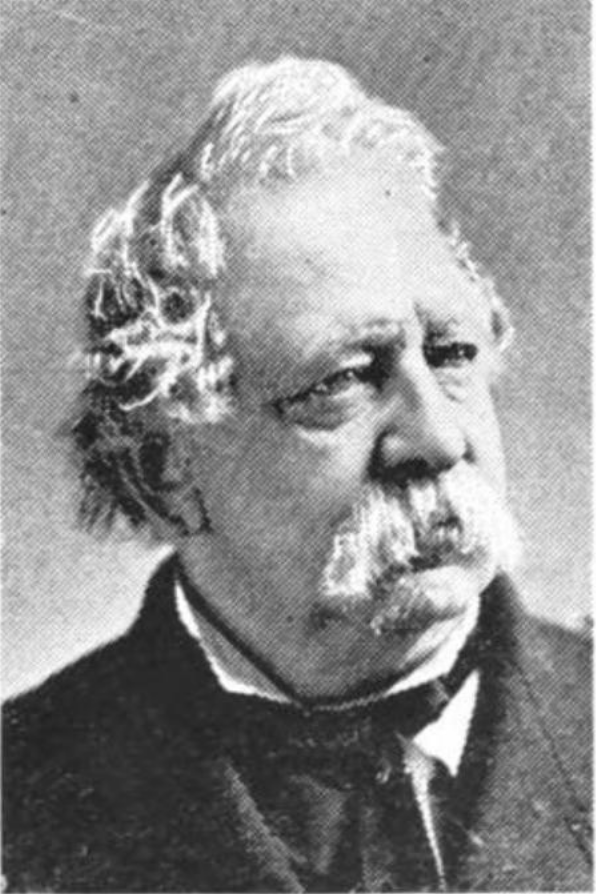

Nominee	Samuel Purdy	Drury P. Baldwin
Party	Democratic	Whig
Popular vote	23,373	19,656
Percentage	54.32%	45.68%
Lieutenant Governor before election
David C. Broderick (Acting)
Democratic
Elected Lieutenant Governor
Samuel Purdy
Democratic

The 1851 California lieutenant gubernatorial election was held on September 3, 1851, in order to elect the lieutenant governor of California. Democratic nominee and former Mayor of Stockton Samuel Purdy defeated Whig nominee Drury P. Baldwin.

== General election ==
On election day, September 3, 1851, Democratic nominee Samuel Purdy won the election by a margin of 3,717 votes against his opponent Whig nominee Drury P. Baldwin, thereby retaining Democratic control over the office of lieutenant governor. Purdy was sworn in as the 3rd lieutenant governor of California on January 8, 1852.

=== Results ===
California lieutenant gubernatorial election, 1851
Party	Candidate	Votes	%
Democratic	Samuel Purdy	23,373	54.32
Whig	Drury P. Baldwin	19,656	45.68
Total votes		43,029	100.00
Democratic hold			
