= 1853 California lieutenant gubernatorial election =

- October 8, 1853
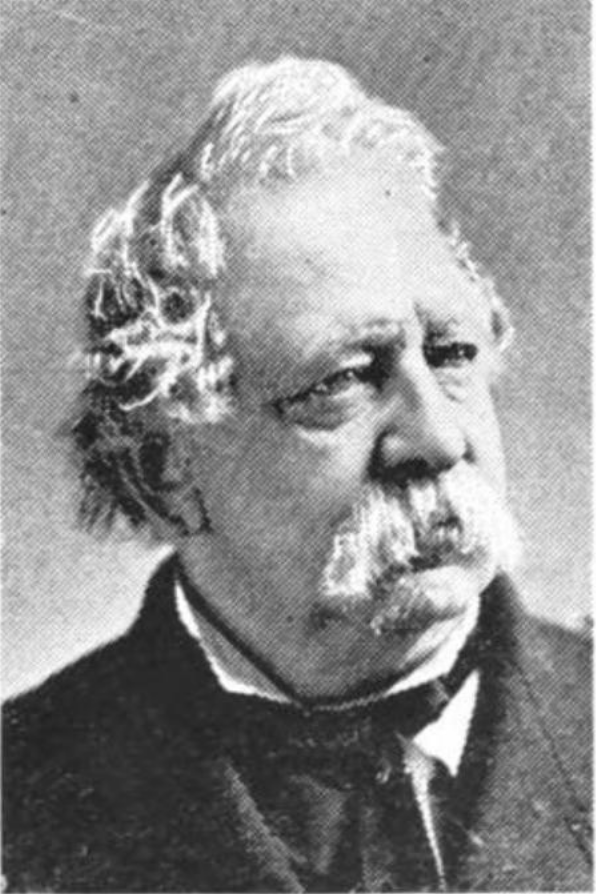

Nominee	Samuel Purdy	Henry Eno
Party	Democratic	Whig
Popular vote	44,498	32,968
Percentage	57.44%	42.56%
Lieutenant Governor before election
Samuel Purdy
Democratic
Elected Lieutenant Governor
Samuel Purdy
Democratic

The 1853 California lieutenant gubernatorial election was held on October 8, 1853, in order to elect the lieutenant governor of California. Democratic nominee and incumbent lieutenant governor Samuel Purdy defeated Whig nominee Henry Eno.

== General election ==
On election day, October 8, 1853, Democratic nominee Samuel Purdy won re-election by a margin of 11,530 votes against his opponent Whig nominee Henry Eno, thereby retaining Democratic control over the office of lieutenant governor. Purdy was sworn in for his second term on January 8, 1854.

=== Results ===
California lieutenant gubernatorial election, 1853
Party	Candidate	Votes	%
Democratic	Samuel Purdy (incumbent)	44,498	57.44
Whig	Henry Eno	32,968	42.56
Total votes		77,466	100.00
Democratic hold			
