= 1851 Wisconsin lieutenant gubernatorial election =

- November 4, 1851
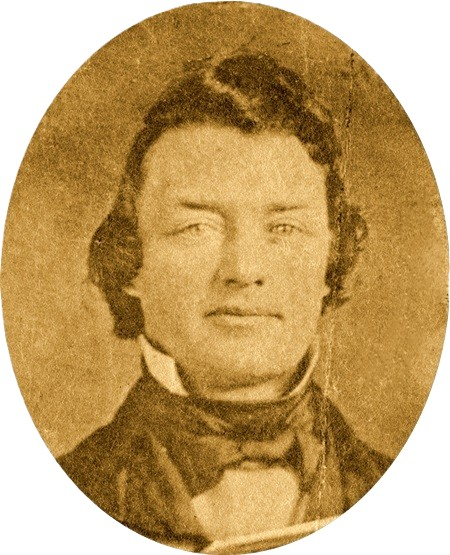

Nominee	Timothy Burns	James Hughes	Benjamin Spaulding
Party	Democratic	Whig	Free Soil
Popular vote	24,605	16,793	2,918
Percentage	55.44%	37.84%	6.57%
Lieutenant Governor before election
Samuel Beall
Democratic
Elected Lieutenant Governor
Timothy Burns
Democratic

The 1851 Wisconsin lieutenant gubernatorial election was held on November 4, 1851, in order to elect the lieutenant governor of Wisconsin. Democratic nominee and former member of the Wisconsin State Assembly Timothy Burns defeated Whig nominee James Hughes and Free soil nominee and former member of the Wisconsin State Assembly Benjamin Spaulding.

== General election ==
On election day, November 4, 1851, Democratic nominee Timothy Burns won the election by a margin of 7,812 votes against his foremost opponent Whig nominee James Hughes, thereby retaining Democratic control over the office of lieutenant governor. Burns was sworn in as the 3rd lieutenant governor of Wisconsin on January 5, 1852.

=== Results ===
Wisconsin lieutenant gubernatorial election, 1851
Party	Candidate	Votes	%
Democratic	Timothy Burns	24,605	55.44
Whig	James Hughes	16,793	37.84
Free Soil	Benjamin Spaulding	2,918	6.57
	Scattering	65	0.15
Total votes		44,381	100.00
Democratic hold			
