= 1839 Connecticut gubernatorial election =

- April 1, 1839
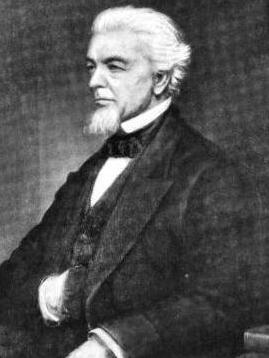

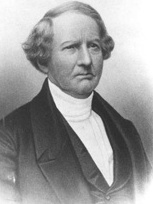
Nominee	William W. Ellsworth	John M. Niles
Party	Whig	Democratic
Popular vote	26,358	23,728
Percentage	51.52%	46.38%
- Ellsworth: 40–50% 50–60% 60–70% 70–80% 80–90% Niles: 40–50% 50–60% 60–70% 70–80% Tie: 40–50% 50% No Vote/Data
Governor before election
William W. Ellsworth
Whig
Elected Governor
William W. Ellsworth
Whig

The 1839 Connecticut gubernatorial election was held on April 1, 1839. Incumbent governor and Whig nominee William W. Ellsworth was re-elected, defeating former senator and Democratic nominee John M. Niles with 51.52% of the vote.

== General election ==
=== Candidates ===
Major party candidates

- William W. Ellsworth, Whig
- John M. Niles, Democratic

Minor party candidates

- Elisha Phelps, Conservative

=== Results ===
1839 Connecticut gubernatorial election
Party	Candidate	Votes	%	±%
Whig	William W. Ellsworth (incumbent)	26,358	51.52%	
Democratic	John M. Niles	23,728	46.38%	
Conservative	Elisha Phelps	1,071	2.09%	
Majority		2,630		
Turnout				
Whig hold		Swing		
