= 1853 Costa Rican general election =

General election held in Costa Rica

- 4 April 1853
- Presidential election
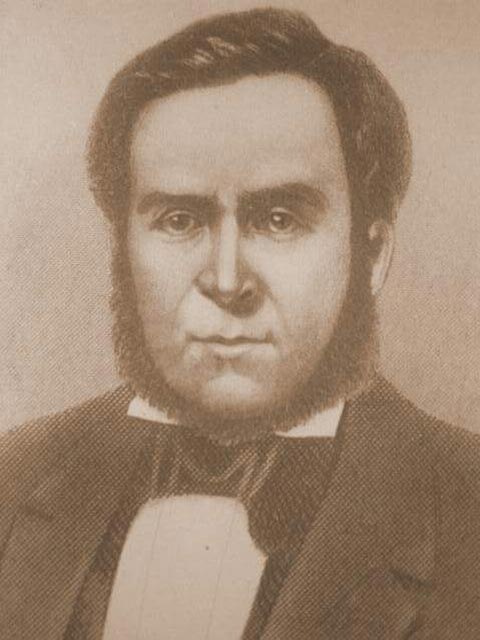

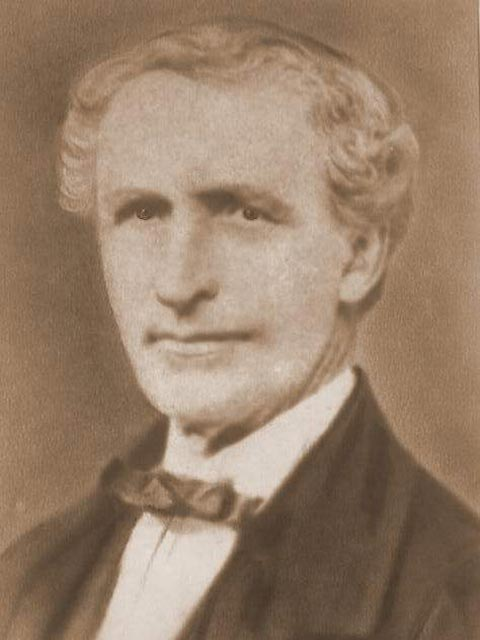
Nominee	Juan Rafael Mora Porras	Manuel Antonio Bonilla Nava
Party	Independent	Independent
Alliance	Morismo	Anti-morismo
Electoral vote	83	6
Percentage	91.21%	6.59%
- Estimated results by province
President before election
Juan Rafael Mora Porras
Independent
Elected President
Juan Rafael Mora Porras
Independent

General elections were held in Costa Rica on 4 April 1853 to elect a president for a six-year term. Incumbent president Juan Rafael Mora Porras was re-elected to a full term with 91.2% of electoral votes.

According to historian Iván Molina, from this election onward and for the following four decades, electoral processes played a largely secondary role in the selection of the president, serving primarily a symbolic function of legitimization. During this period, presidents were effectively chosen through political agreements between the coffee-growing bourgeoisie and the military, a pattern that persisted until the consolidation of the Liberal State during 1880s and the protests following the 1889 election. In the second-degree election, Mora received 83 electoral votes.

== Results ==
Candidate	Votes	%
Juan Rafael Mora Porras	83	91.21
Manuel Antonio Bonilla Nava	6	6.59
Joaquín Mora Fernández	1	1.10
Manuel Alvarado y Barroeta	1	1.10
Total	91	100.00
Source: TSE
