= 1849 Wisconsin lieutenant gubernatorial election =

- November 6, 1849

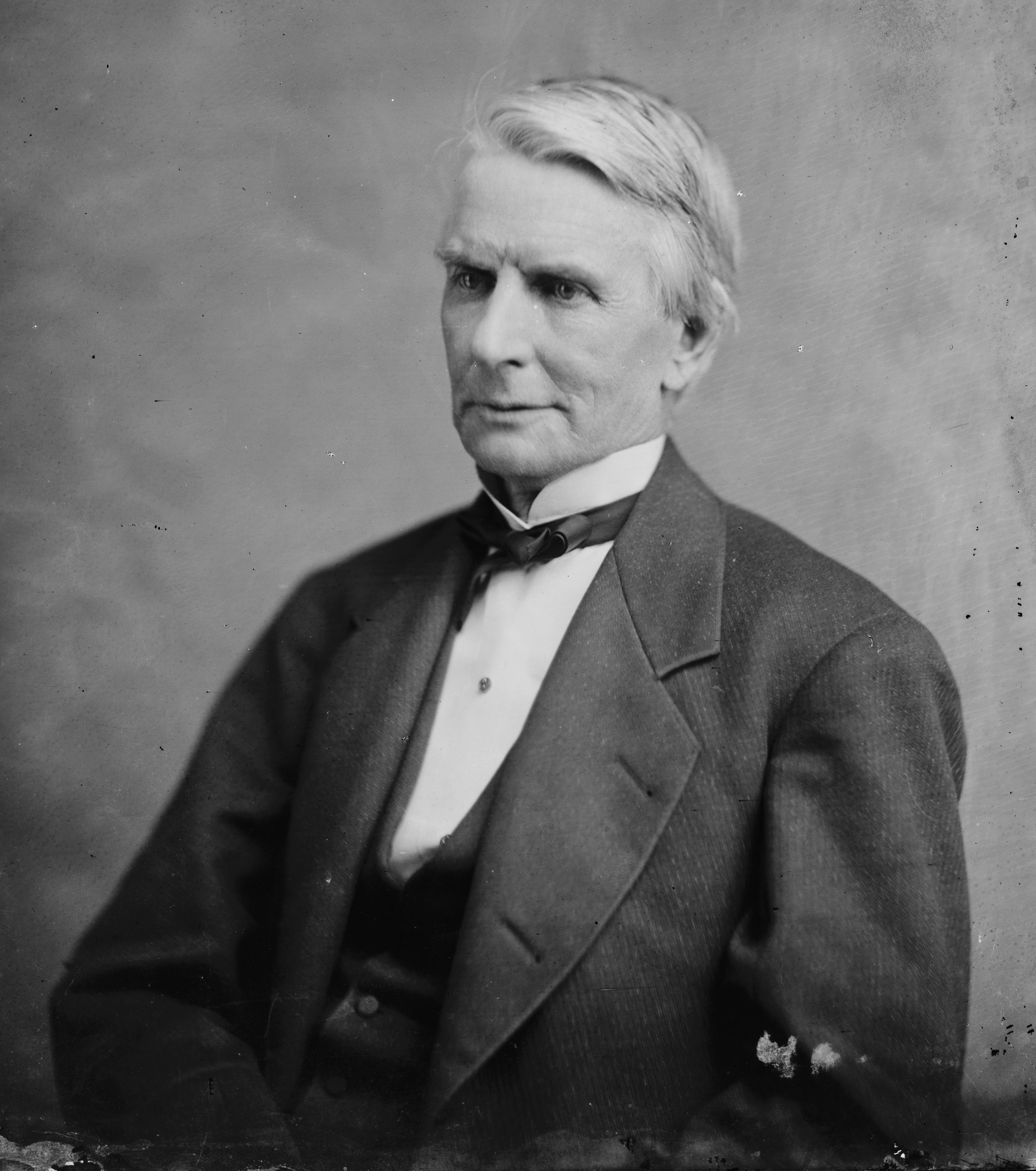

Nominee	Samuel Beall	Timothy O. Howe	John Bannister
Party	Democratic	Whig	Free Soil
Popular vote	16,446	10,983	3,976
Percentage	52.33%	34.95%	12.65%
Lieutenant Governor before election
John Edwin Holmes
Democratic
Elected Lieutenant Governor
Samuel Beall
Democratic

The 1849 Wisconsin lieutenant gubernatorial election was held on November 6, 1849, in order to elect the lieutenant governor of Wisconsin. Democratic nominee Samuel Beall defeated Whig nominee and former nominee for Wisconsin's 3rd congressional district in the 1848 election Timothy O. Howe and Free soil nominee and incumbent judge of Fond du Lac County John Bannister.

== General election ==
On election day, November 6, 1849, Democratic nominee Samuel Beall won the election by a margin of 5,463 votes against his foremost opponent Whig nominee Timothy O. Howe, thereby retaining Democratic control over the office of lieutenant governor. Beall was sworn in as the 2nd lieutenant governor of Wisconsin on January 7, 1850.

=== Results ===
Wisconsin lieutenant gubernatorial election, 1849
Party	Candidate	Votes	%
Democratic	Samuel Beall	16,446	52.33
Whig	Timothy O. Howe	10,983	34.95
Free Soil	John Bannister	3,976	12.65
	Scattering	21	0.07
Total votes		31,426	100.00
Democratic hold			
