= 1853 Texas lieutenant gubernatorial election =

- August 1, 1853
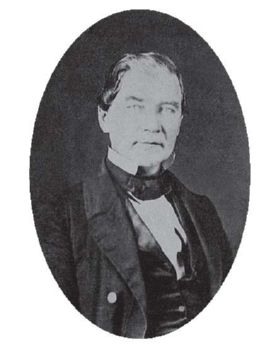

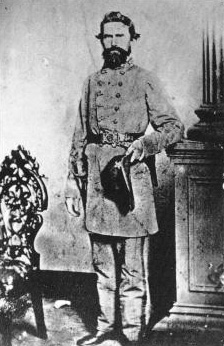

Nominee	David Catchings Dickson	Jerome B. Robertson
Party	Democratic	Democratic
Popular vote	14,215	6,868
Percentage	43.4%	21.0%
Nominee	Jared E. Kirby	William C. Henry
Party	Whig	Democratic
Popular vote	5,967	4,823
Percentage	18.2%	14.7%
Lieutenant Governor before election
James Wilson Henderson
Democratic
Elected Lieutenant Governor
David Catchings Dickson
Democratic

The 1853 Texas lieutenant gubernatorial election was held on August 1, 1853, in order to elect the lieutenant governor of Texas. Speaker of the Texas House David C. Dickson won a contested race becoming the fourth lieutenant governor of the state.

== General election ==
The incumbent lieutenant governor, James Wilson Henderson, did not run for reelection. There had not been a strong partisan during the Republic period of Texas, but since the 1848 presidential election the Democratic Party had become the most prominent political organization in the state. The Whig Party also had a presence in the state, but its support was not widespread. However, neither of these parties were particularly organized and even if candidates did identify with a political party, they often ran independent campaigns. The Democratic Party leadership attempted to organize a convention to nominate candidates for governor and lieutenant governor, but not enough delegates were able to attend.

Democratic Speaker of the Texas House David C. Dickson won with almost 44% of the vote against his foremost opponents Democratic state senator Jerome B. Robertson and Whig candidate Jared Kirby. The results were certified by the legislature on November 12, 1853, and Dickson was sworn into office on December 21.

=== Candidates ===
- David Catchings Dickson, Speaker of the Texas House of Representatives, former justice of the peace, former surgeon in the Army of the Republic of Texas
- Richard A. Goode
- William C. Henry, of Cherokee County
- Jared E. Kirby, plantation owner
- Jerome Bonaparte Robertson, doctor, state senator, militia leader, former state representative, former mayor of Washington-on-the-Brazos

=== Results ===
Texas lieutenant gubernatorial election, 1853
Party	Candidate	Votes	%
Democratic	David Catchings Dickson	14,215	43.39
Democratic	Jerome B. Robertson	6,868	20.97
Whig	Jared E. Kirby	5,967	18.22
Democratic	William C. Henry	4,823	14.72
Democratic	Richard A. Goode	885	2.70
Total votes		32,758	100.00
Democratic hold			

== Aftermath ==
Governor Peter H. Bell, who had been reelected in the 1851 gubernatorial election, resigned from the office in order to fill a vacancy in congress. This led to James Henderson becoming Governor for the final 28 days of Bell's term.
