= John Boyd (Connecticut politician) =

American politician (1799–1881)

Secretary of State of Connecticut
- In office 1858–1861
- Preceded by: Orville H. Platt
- Succeeded by: James Hammond Trumbull

Member of the Connecticut Senate from the 15th district
- In office 1854–1855

Member of the Connecticut House of Representatives from the Litchfield County district
- In office 1835–1836
- In office 1830–1831

Personal details
- Born: March 17, 1799 Winsted, Winchester, Connecticut
- Died: December 1, 1881 (aged 82) West Winsted, Winchester, Connecticut, U.S.
- Party: Free Soil (before 1854); Whig (1854)
- Spouse(s): Emily Webster Beers (m. 1831; died 1842) Jerusha Rockwell Hinsdale (m. 1843; died 1875)
- Children: 3
- Education: Yale College
- Occupation: Iron manufacturer; politician; judge

John Boyd (March 17, 1799 – December 1, 1881) was an American politician who served as a Connecticut state legislator and the Secretary of State of Connecticut.

== Early life ==
John Boyd was born on March 17, 1799, in Winsted, Winchester, Connecticut, to Mary (née Munro) and James Boyd. His parents had Scotch descendants. His father was co-partner of a scythe manufacturing company in Winsted that was later named the Winsted Manufacturing Company. His father would later marry Jane Munro, a half-sister of his first wife. In 1817 or 1818, Boyd attended Hartford Grammar School. He graduated from Yale College in 1821. He studied law with Seth Perkins Staples and Samuel J. Hitchcock in New Haven and was admitted to the bar in 1825.

== Career ==
Boyd moved back to Winchester. In 1827, he worked with his father in Winsted as an iron manufacturer under the firm James Boyd & Son, succeeding his twin brother James W. Boyd who died in 1826. He continued working with his father until 1850 and then continued with the business until he retired in 1853.

Boyd served as a member of the Connecticut General Assembly in 1830 and 1835. He was county commissioner of Litchfield County in 1840 and from 1849 to 1850. In 1853, he was a Free Soil candidate for lieutenant governor. He was nominated as the Whig candidate for state senator in March 1854. He was a member of the Connecticut Senate, representing the 15th district, in 1854. He served as judge of probate for 15 years up until age disqualified him in 1869. He was town clerk of Winchester for 26 years. He was first elected to the role in 1829 and served at different times up until 1875.

Boyd served as Secretary of State of Connecticut from 1859 to 1861. In 1861, he enlisted with a company in Winsted and marched with the company to New Haven. He was not accepted into Union service. In 1873, he published the Annals and Family Records of Winchester, a history of the early settlers and the town of Winchester.

== Personal life ==
Boyd married Emily Webster Beers, daughter of Elias Beers, of New Haven on May 17, 1831. They had three children, including Ellen W. His wife died in 1842. He married Jerusha Rockwell Hinsdale, daughter of Solomon Rockwell and widow of Theodore Hinsdale, of Winsted on December 10, 1843. His wife died in 1875. Following the death of his second wife, he lived with his stepdaughter Mary P. Hinsdale. He was a member of the Second Congregational Church.

Boyd died on December 1, 1881, at his home in West Winsted, Winchester.

Party political offices
Preceded by John Milton Niles	Free Soil nominee for Governor of Connecticut; 1850, 1851	Succeeded by Francis Gillette
Political offices
Preceded by Orville H. Platt	Secretary of the State of Connecticut; 1858–1861	Succeeded by James Hammond Trumbull
