= 1857 Mexican general election =

September 1857
- Presidential election
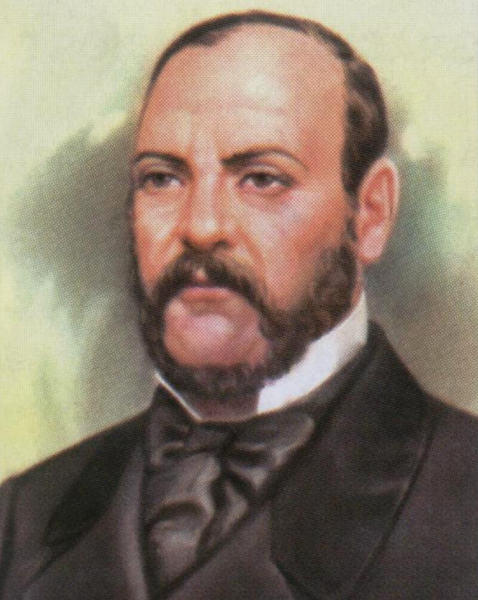

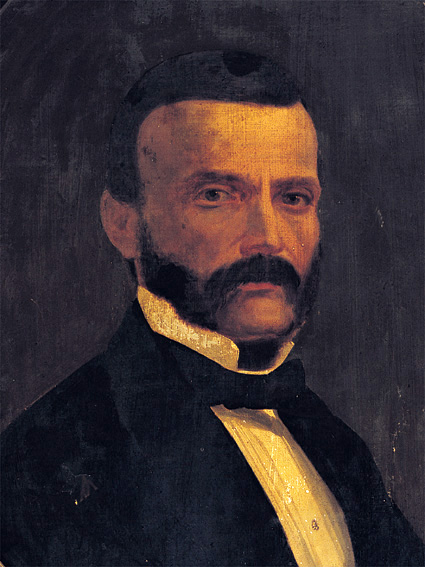
Nominee	Ignacio Comonfort	Miguel Lerdo de Tejada
Popular vote	8,084	639
Percentage	92.67%	7.33%
President before election
Ignacio Comonfort
Elected President
Ignacio Comonfort

General elections were held in Mexico in September 1857. They were the first to be held under the February 1857 constitution, which introduced direct elections for the presidency, abolished the Senate, and introduced universal male suffrage for citizens aged 18 (if married) or 20 (if single), as long as they had an "honest mode of living".

Incumbent president Ignacio Comonfort was re-elected with 93% of the vote, defeating Miguel Lerdo de Tejada.

== Results ==
=== President ===
Candidate	Votes	%
Ignacio Comonfort	8,084	92.67
Miguel Lerdo de Tejada	639	7.33
Total	8,723	100.00
Source: Hamnett
