= Thomas H. Seymour =

American politician (1807–1868)

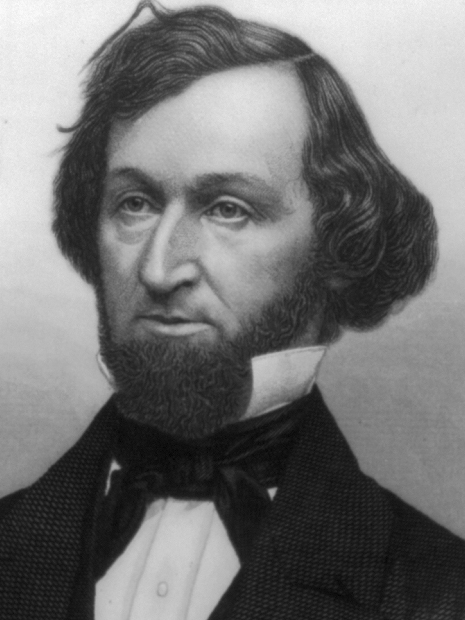

United States Minister to Russia
- In office April 2, 1854 – July 17, 1858
- President: Franklin Pierce; James Buchanan
- Preceded by: Neill S. Brown
- Succeeded by: Francis Wilkinson Pickens

36th Governor of Connecticut
- In office May 4, 1850 – October 13, 1853
- Lieutenant: Charles H. Pond; Green Kendrick; Charles H. Pond
- Preceded by: Joseph Trumbull
- Succeeded by: Charles H. Pond

Member of the U.S. House of Representatives from Connecticut's 1st district
- In office March 4, 1843 – March 3, 1845
- Preceded by: Joseph Trumbull
- Succeeded by: James Dixon

Personal details
- Born: Thomas Hart Seymour; September 29, 1807 Hartford, Connecticut, US
- Died: September 3, 1868 (aged 60) Hartford, Connecticut, US
- Party: Democratic
- Profession: Politician, Lawyer

Thomas Hart Seymour (September 29, 1807 – September 3, 1868) was an American lawyer and Democratic Party politician who served as the 36th governor of Connecticut from 1850 to 1853 and as minister to the Russian Empire from 1853 to 1858. He was the leader of the peace settlement in the Democratic Party, and narrowly lost the April 1863 gubernatorial election.

== Early life ==
Born in Hartford, Connecticut, to Major Henry Seymour and Jane Ellery, Seymour was sent to public schools as a child and graduated from Middletown Military Academy in Middletown, Connecticut, in 1829. He studied law and was admitted to the bar in 1833, commencing practice in Hartford.

== Career ==
A judge of probate from 1836 to 1838, Seymour was also Editor of the Jeffersonian from 1837 to 1838. In 1842, he was elected to the U.S. House of Representatives and served one term from 1843 to 1845, declining reelection in 1844.

During the Mexican–American War, Seymour was commissioned as a major in the Connecticut Infantry on March 16, 1846, later recommissioned to the new 9th United States Infantry on April 9, 1847. Due to his courageous leadership at the Battle of Chapultepec, he was promoted to lieutenant colonel of the 12th Infantry under Colonel Milledge L. Bonham on August 12, 1847.

After the war, Seymour made an unsuccessful run for Governor of Connecticut in 1849, but was elected governor by the Connecticut General Assembly the next year in 1850. He was re-elected in 1851, 1852 and 1853. He served as an 1852 presidential elector, endorsing Franklin Pierce and, in return for his support, Seymour was appointed to serve as minister to Russia and resigned the governorship shortly after being reelected to a fourth term. He accepted the commission of Minister to Russia from President Franklin Pierce. He resigned from the governorship on October 13, 1853, and spent the next four years in Russia, where he built a warm and ongoing alliance with tsar Nicholas and his son tsar Alexander. He served in this position until 1858 when President James Buchanan replaced him with Francis W. Pickens. In Russia, his attaches included Daniel Coit Gilman and Andrew Dickson White.

Seymour made two unsuccessful attempts to return to the governorship in 1860 and 1863 and unsuccessfully sought the Democratic nomination for President of the United States at the 1864 Democratic National Convention, losing to Civil War general George B. McClellan.

== Death and legacy ==
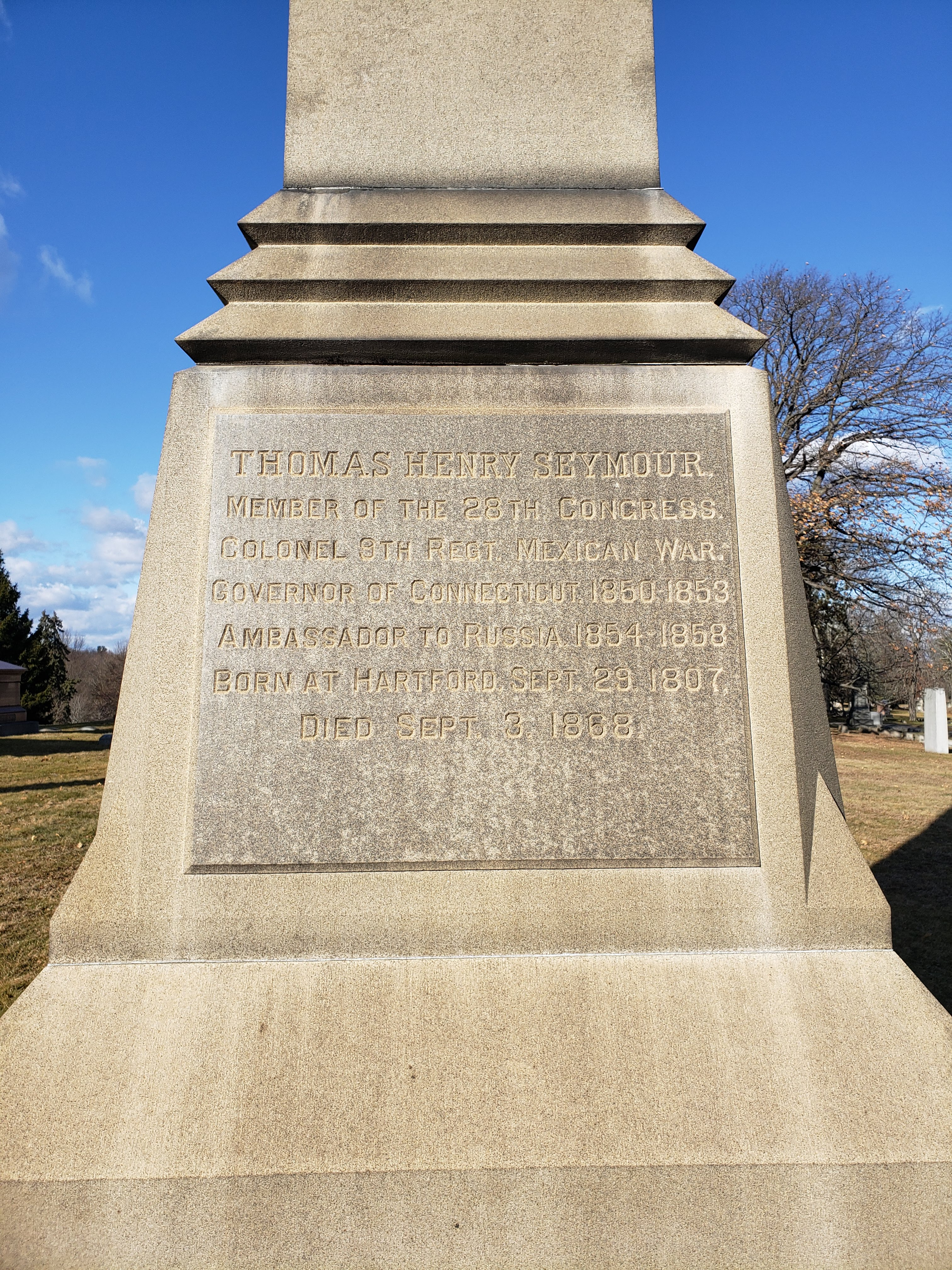
Thomas Henry Seymour gravestone in Cedar Hill Cemetery

Seymour died of typhoid fever, in Hartford, Connecticut, on September 3, 1868 (age 60 years, 340 days). He is interred at Cedar Hill Cemetery. In 1850, the town of Humphreysville, Connecticut was renamed Seymour in his honor.

Party political offices
Preceded by George S. Catlin	Democratic nominee for Governor of Connecticut; 1849, 1850, 1851, 1852, 1853	Succeeded by Samuel Ingham
Preceded by James T. Pratt	Democratic nominee for Governor of Connecticut; 1860	Succeeded by James Chaffee Loomis
Preceded by James Chaffee Loomis	Democratic nominee for Governor of Connecticut; 1863	Succeeded by Origen S. Seymour
U.S. House of Representatives
Preceded by Joseph Trumbull	Member of the U.S. House of Representatives from Connecticut's 1st congressional district March 4, 1843 – March 3, 1845	Succeeded by James Dixon
Political offices
Preceded by Joseph Trumbull	Governor of Connecticut; May 4, 1850 – October 13, 1853	Succeeded by Charles H. Pond
Diplomatic posts
Preceded by Neill S. Brown	United States Ambassador to Russia; May 24, 1853 – July 17, 1858	Succeeded by Francis W. Pickens
