= Joseph Trumbull (politician) =

American politician

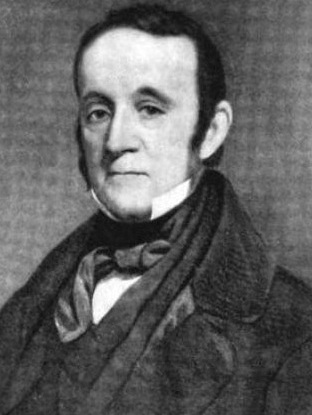

35th Governor of Connecticut
- In office May 2, 1849 – May 4, 1850
- Lieutenant: Thomas Backus
- Preceded by: Clark Bissell
- Succeeded by: Thomas H. Seymour

Member of the U.S. House of Representatives from Connecticut
- In office March 4, 1839 – March 3, 1843
- Preceded by: Isaac Toucey
- Succeeded by: Thomas H. Seymour
- Constituency: 1st district
- In office December 1, 1834 – March 3, 1835
- Preceded by: William W. Ellsworth
- Succeeded by: Elisha Haley
- Constituency: At-large district

Member of the Connecticut House of Representatives
- In office 1832

Personal details
- Born: Joseph Trumbull; December 7, 1782 Lebanon, Connecticut
- Died: August 4, 1861 (aged 78) Hartford, Connecticut
- Resting place: Old North Cemetery in Hartford
- Party: Whig
- Spouse(s): Harriet Champion; Eliza Storrs
- Education: Yale University

Joseph Trumbull (December 7, 1782 – August 4, 1861) was a U.S. lawyer, banker, and politician from Connecticut. He represented Connecticut in the U.S. Congress from 1834 to 1835, then again from 1839 to 1843. He later served as the 35th governor of Connecticut from 1849 to 1850.

== Early life ==
Joseph Trumbull was born in Lebanon, Connecticut, on December 7, 1782. He graduated from Yale University in 1801, and studied law with his cousin William Trumbull Williams. In 1802 he moved to the Connecticut Western Reserve (now Trumbull County, Ohio) and was admitted to the bar. Shortly thereafter he moved back to Connecticut, establishing a law practice in Hartford.

== Career ==
In addition to a successful law practice, Trumbull was active in several businesses. From 1828 to 1839 he was president of the Hartford Bank, and he served as president of the Providence, Hartford & Fishkill Railroad.

Originally a National Republican, and later a Whig, Trumbull began his political career with election to the Connecticut House of Representatives in 1832.

He was sent to the U.S. Congress in December 1834 to complete the term of William W. Ellsworth who had resigned, and was elected as a Whig to the Twenty-sixth and Twenty-seventh Congresses (March 4, 1839 – March 3, 1843).

Trumbull served as Governor of Connecticut in 1849 and 1850.

In 1849 he received the honorary degree of LL.D. from Yale. In 1851 he served again in the Connecticut House of Representatives.

== Death and burial ==
He died in Hartford on August 4, 1861, as a result of typhoid fever. He was buried at Old North Cemetery in Hartford. Two days later, his second wife Eliza also died.

Within a year of his death ten of his close relatives died, including his sister Abigail, his wife Eliza, his brother-in-law William L. Storrs, Joseph and Eliza's daughter Eliza, their son-in-law Lucius Robinson and Lucius' father David Robinson.

== Family ==
Joseph Trumbull was born into an influential and politically active family. His grandfather, Jonathan Trumbull, was a colonial Connecticut governor and was the first governor of the State of Connecticut, serving a total of fourteen one year terms. His uncle, Jonathan Trumbull Jr. served as governor for ten terms. Another uncle, John Trumbull, served as a personal aide to George Washington during the Revolutionary War and became a famous painter. Several of his paintings are hanging in the Capitol Rotunda in Washington, D.C. His aunt Mary Trumbull married William Williams, a political activist and signer of the Declaration of Independence.

His first wife, Harriet Champion, was the daughter of Henry Champion, a general in the Revolutionary War. His second wife was the sister of William L. Storrs, a U.S. Congressman and later the Chief Justice of the Supreme Court of Connecticut.

Joseph Trumbull was born to David Trumbull and his wife née Sarah Backus in Lebanon, Connecticut. He lived in the family home known as Redwood, on the Lebanon green.

David and Sarah had five children. Joseph's siblings were:

- Sarah Trumbull (1779–1839), who married William Trumbull Williams (1779–1839), her cousin
- Abigail Trumbull (1781–1861), who married Peter Lanman (1771–1854)
- John Trumbull (1784–1859), who married Anne Gibbons (1789–1823), Hanna Wallace Tunis (1800–1823) and Eliza Bruen (1793–1857)
- Jonathan G. W. Trumbull (about 1790–1853), who married Jane Eliza Lathrop (1795–1843)

Harriet died in 1823 and Joseph married Eliza Storrs (1784–1861), sister of William L. Storrs, on December 1 of the following year. With his second wife he was the father of a daughter, Eliza Storrs Trumbull (1826–1862).

Party political offices
Preceded by Clark Bissell	Whig nominee for Governor of Connecticut; 1849	Succeeded by Lafayette S. Foster
U.S. House of Representatives
Preceded by William W. Ellsworth	Member of the U.S. House of Representatives from Connecticut's at-large congressional district 1834–1835	Succeeded by Elisha Haley
Preceded by Isaac Toucey	Member of the U.S. House of Representatives from Connecticut's 1st congressional district 1839–1843	Succeeded by Thomas H. Seymour
Political offices
Preceded by Clark Bissell	Governor of Connecticut; 1849–1850	Succeeded by Thomas H. Seymour
