= Thomas Backus =

American politician

41st Lieutenant Governor of Connecticut
- In office May 2, 1849 – May 4, 1850
- Governor: Joseph Trumbull
- Preceded by: Charles J. McCurdy
- Succeeded by: Charles H. Pond

Personal details
- Born: 1800
- Died: 1858 (aged 57–58)
- Party: Whig
- Spouse: Sarah Young Backus
- Profession: Politician

Thomas Backus (1800–1858) was a nineteenth-century American politician. He served as the 41st lieutenant governor of Connecticut from 1849 to 1850.

== Biography ==
Backus, who lived in Killingly, Connecticut, was born in 1800. He married Sarah Young who was born in 1811 and died in 1896.

Backus was a member of the Connecticut State House of Representatives in 1829 and 1833. He was elected as a member of the Connecticut State Senate in 1835 and 1838, representing the 14th District. He served as the 41st Lieutenant Governor of Connecticut under Governor Joseph Trumbull, and served from 1849 to 1850.

Backus died in 1858 and is interred at Old Westfield Cemetery, Danielson, Windham County, Connecticut.

== See also ==
- List of governors of Connecticut

Political offices
Preceded by Charles J. McCurdy	Lieutenant Governor of Connecticut; 1849-1850	Succeeded by Charles H. Pond
