= Green Kendrick =

American politician (1798–1873)

43rd Lieutenant Governor of Connecticut
- In office May 7, 1851 – May 7, 1852
- Governor: Thomas H. Seymour
- Preceded by: Charles H. Pond
- Succeeded by: Charles H. Pond

Personal details
- Born: April 1, 1798
- Died: August 26, 1873 (aged 75)
- Resting place: Riverside Cemetery, Waterbury, Connecticut, U.S.
- Party: Whig
- Profession: Politician

Green Kendrick (April 1, 1798 – August 26, 1873) was an American politician who was elected as a Whig as the 43rd Lieutenant Governor of Connecticut from 1851 to 1852. As his party's nominee for governor in the 1852 election, he was defeated by the incumbent Democrat Thomas H. Seymour, gaining 45 percent of the vote. He later served as Speaker of the House in the 1854 and 1856 sessions of the state legislature. He was the father of politician John Kendrick.

He died on August 26, 1873, and was interred at Riverside Cemetery in Waterbury, Connecticut.

Party political offices
Preceded by Lafayette S. Foster	Whig nominee for Governor of Connecticut; 1852	Succeeded by Henry Dutton
Political offices
Preceded by Charles H. Pond	Lieutenant Governor of Connecticut; 1851–1852	Succeeded by Charles H. Pond
