= Charles H. Pond =

American politician (1781–1861)

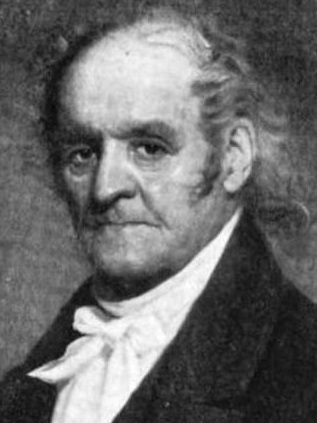

37th Governor of Connecticut
- In office October 13, 1853 – May 3, 1854
- Lieutenant: Vacant
- Preceded by: Thomas H. Seymour
- Succeeded by: Henry Dutton

42nd and 44th Lieutenant Governor of Connecticut
- In office 1852–1853
- Governor: Thomas H. Seymour
- Preceded by: Green Kendrick
- Succeeded by: Alexander H. Holley
- In office 1850–1851
- Governor: Thomas H. Seymour
- Preceded by: Thomas Backus
- Succeeded by: Green Kendrick

Personal details
- Born: April 26, 1781 Milford, Connecticut
- Died: April 28, 1861 (aged 80)
- Party: Democratic
- Spouse: Catherine Dickinson
- Education: Yale University
- Profession: lawyer, politician

Charles Hobby Pond (April 26, 1781 – April 28, 1861) was an American politician who was the 42nd and 44th lieutenant governor of Connecticut from 1850 to 1853 and who served as the 37th governor for seven months (1853–1854) after the resignation of Governor Thomas Hart Seymour.

== Biography ==
Born in Milford, Connecticut, on April 26, 1781, Pond was the son of Captain and Martha (Miles) Pond. Prepared by his pastor, he attended college beginning at age seventeen and graduated from Yale University in 1802. He studied law with Roger Minot Sherman, of Fairfield, for two years and was admitted to the bar in Fairfield County. Instead of beginning practice, he took a long sea voyage for his health and it suited him so well that he took another. The result was he followed the sea for several years as an employee of his father's shipping business; first as a supercargo, then as captain. Regaining his former health he took up his residence on land again. He was married in 1809 to Catherine Dickinson and they had seven children.

== Career ==
Pond served as an associate judge of New Haven County Court from 1818 to 1819, sheriff of New Haven from 1819 to 1834, and as judge of New Haven County Court from 1836 to 1837.

Pond was elected Lieutenant Governor of Connecticut in 1850, 1852, and 1853. On October 13, 1853, Governor Thomas H. Seymour resigned from office, and Pond, who was Lieutenant Governor at the time, assumed the duties of Governor. During his tenure, the U.S. Senate passed the Kansas-Nebraska Bill, which caused great controversy throughout the state. (The act made slavery legally possible in a vast new area and revived the bitter quarrel over the expansion of slavery, which had died down after the Compromise of 1850, hastening the start of the Civil War.) Pond did not seek reelection and left office, retiring from public service.

== Death and legacy ==
The same month and year of the bombardment of Fort Sumter, Pond died on April 28, 1861, aged 80. He is interred at Milford Cemetery, Milford, Connecticut. He is memorialized on the Milford Founding Fathers Memorial in Milford.

Political offices
Preceded by Thomas Backus	Lieutenant Governor of Connecticut; 1850–1851	Succeeded by Green Kendrick
Preceded by Green Kendrick	Lieutenant Governor of Connecticut; 1852–1853	Succeeded by Alexander H. Holley
Preceded by Thomas H. Seymour	Governor of Connecticut; 1853–1854	Succeeded by Henry Dutton
