= List of elections in 1846 =

The following elections occurred in the year 1846.

- 1846 Chilean parliamentary election
- 1846 Chilean presidential election
- 1846 French legislative election
- 1846 Salvadoran presidential election
- 1846 conclave

== North America ==
=== Central America ===
- 1846 Salvadoran presidential election

=== United States ===
- 1846 New York state election
- 1846 United States elections

==== United States Senate ====
- 1846 and 1847 United States Senate elections

==== United States House of Representatives ====
- 1846 United States House of Representatives elections
- 1846 United States House of Representatives election in Florida

==== United States lieutenant gubernatorial ====
- 1846 Connecticut lieutenant gubernatorial election
- 1846 Illinois lieutenant gubernatorial election

==== United States gubernatorial ====
- 1846 Connecticut gubernatorial election
- 1846 Delaware gubernatorial special election
- 1846 Illinois gubernatorial election
- 1846 Indiana gubernatorial election
- 1846 Iowa gubernatorial election
- 1846 Louisiana gubernatorial election
- 1846 Maine gubernatorial election
- 1846 Massachusetts gubernatorial election
- 1846 New Hampshire gubernatorial election
- 1846 New York gubernatorial election
- 1846 North Carolina gubernatorial election
- 1846 Ohio gubernatorial election
- 1846 Rhode Island gubernatorial election
- 1846 South Carolina gubernatorial election
- 1846 Vermont gubernatorial election

==== United States mayoral elections ====
- 1846 Boston mayoral election
- 1846 Chicago mayoral election
- 1846 Manchester, New Hampshire, mayoral election
- 1846 Philadelphia mayoral election

== See also ==
- Category:1846 elections
