= Know Nothing =

1850s American nativist political party

American Party
- Other name: Native American Party (before 1855); American Party (after 1855)
- First Leader: Lewis Charles Levin
- Founded: 1844; 182 years ago
- Dissolved: 1860; 166 years ago
- Merger of: American Republican Party; Whig Party (elements)
- Preceded by: American Republican Party
- Merged into: Republican Party (free states); Union Party (slave states)
- Succeeded by: Constitutional Union Party
- Headquarters: New York City
- Secret wing: Order of the Star Spangled Banner
- Ideology: Old Stock nativism; American nationalism; Anti-immigration; Anti-Catholicism (US); Hibernophobia; Germanophobia; Cultural assimilationism
- Religion: Protestantism
- Colors: Red White Blue (American flag colors)
- Senate (1856): 5 / 66 (peak)
- House of Representatives (1854): 52 / 234 (peak)

Party flag
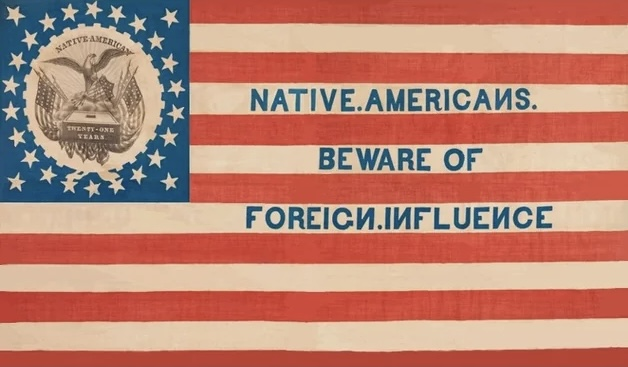

The American Party, known as the Native American Party before 1855 (Note: The Know Nothings used the name "Native American Party" generations before the indigenous peoples of the United States were commonly referred to as "Native Americans". As the membership of the party chiefly consisted of the descendants of colonists and did not include Native Americans, the term "native" in the name of the party refers to those who were brought up in the United States, as opposed to immigrants.) and colloquially referred to as the Know Nothing, Know-Nothings, or the Know Nothing Party, was an Old Stock nativist political movement in the United States from the 1840s through the 1850s. Members of the movement were required to say "I know nothing" whenever they were asked about its specifics by outsiders, providing the group with its colloquial name.

Supporters of the Know Nothing movement believed that an alleged "Romanist" conspiracy to subvert civil and religious liberty in the U.S. was being hatched by Catholics. Therefore, they sought to politically organize native-born Protestants in defense of their traditional religious and political values. The Know Nothing movement is remembered for this theme because Protestants feared that Catholic priests and bishops would control a large bloc of voters. In most places, the ideology and influence of the Know Nothing movement lasted only one or two years before it disintegrated due to weak and inexperienced local leaders, a lack of publicly proclaimed national leaders, and a deep split over the issue of slavery. In parts of the South, the party did not emphasize anti-Catholicism as frequently as it emphasized it in the North and it stressed a neutral position on slavery, but it became the main alternative to the dominant Democratic Party.

The Know Nothings supplemented their xenophobic nativist views with populist appeals. At the state level, the party was, in some cases, progressive in its stances on "issues of labor rights and the need for more government spending" and furnished "support for an expansion of the rights of women, the regulation of industry, and support of measures which were designed to improve the status of working people". It was a forerunner of the temperance movement in the U.S.

The Know Nothing movement briefly emerged as a major political party in the form of the American Party. The collapse of the Whig Party after the passage of the Kansas–Nebraska Act left an opening for the emergence of a new major political party in opposition to the Democratic Party. The Know Nothing movement managed to elect congressman Nathaniel P. Banks of Massachusetts and several other individuals into office in the 1854 elections, and it subsequently coalesced into a new political party which was known as the American Party. Particularly in the South, the American Party served as a vehicle for politicians who opposed the Democrats. Many of the American Party's members and supporters also hoped that it would stake out a middle ground between the pro-slavery positions of Democratic politicians and the radical anti-slavery positions of the rapidly emerging Republican Party. The American Party nominated former president Millard Fillmore in the 1856 presidential election, but he kept quiet about his membership in it and he personally refrained from supporting the Know Nothing movement's activities and ideology. Fillmore received 21.5% of the popular vote in the 1856 presidential election, finishing behind the Democratic and Republican nominees. Henry Winter Davis, an active Know-Nothing, was elected on the American Party ticket to Congress from Maryland. He told Congress that "un-American" Irish Catholic immigrants were to blame for the recent election of Democrat James Buchanan as president, stating:

The recent election has developed in an aggravated form every evil against which the American party protested. Foreign allies have decided the government of the country – men naturalized in thousands on the eve of the election. Again in the fierce struggle for supremacy, men have forgotten the ban which the Republic puts on the intrusion of religious influence on the political arena. These influences have brought vast multitudes of foreign-born citizens to the polls, ignorant of American interests, without American feelings, influenced by foreign sympathies, to vote on American affairs; and those votes have, in point of fact, accomplished the present result.

The party entered a period of rapid decline after Fillmore's loss. In 1857 the Dred Scott v. Sandford pro-slavery decision of the U.S. Supreme Court further galvanized opposition to slavery in the North, causing many former Know Nothings to join the Republicans. The remnants of the American Party largely joined the Constitutional Union Party in 1860 and they disappeared during the American Civil War.

== History ==
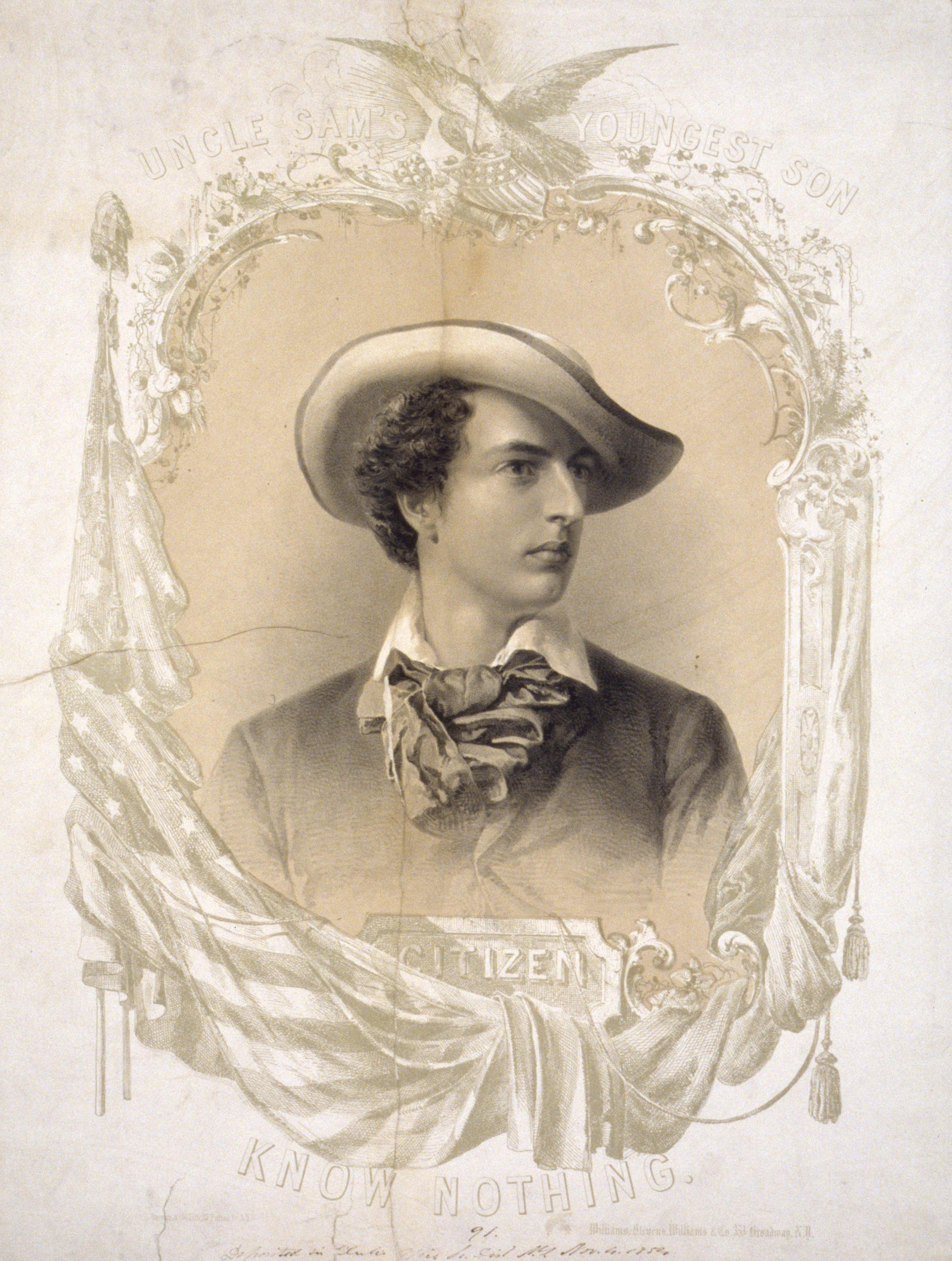
Uncle Sam's youngest son, Citizen Know Nothing, an 1854 print

Anti-Catholicism was widespread in colonial America, but it played a minor role in American politics until the arrival of large numbers of Irish and German Catholics surged in the 1840s. It then emerged in nativist attacks. It appeared in New York City politics as early as 1843 under the banner of the American Republican Party. The movement quickly spread to nearby states using that name or Native American Party or variants of it. They succeeded in a number of local and Congressional elections, notably in 1844 in Philadelphia, where the anti-Catholic orator Lewis Charles Levin was elected Representative from Pennsylvania's 1st district. In the early 1850s, numerous secret orders grew up, of which the Order of United Americans and the Order of the Star Spangled Banner came to be the most important. They emerged in New York in the early 1850s as a secret order that quickly spread across the North, reaching non-Catholics, particularly those who were lower middle class or skilled workers.

The name Know Nothing originated in the semi-secret organization of the party. When a member of the party was asked about his activities, he was supposed to say, "I know nothing." Outsiders derisively called the party's members "Know Nothings", and the name stuck. In 1855, the Know Nothings first entered politics under the American Party label.

=== Underlying issues ===
The immigration of large numbers of Irish and German Catholics to the United States in the period between 1840 and 1860 made religious differences between Catholics and Protestants a political issue. Violence occasionally erupted at the polls. Protestants alleged that Pope Pius IX had contributed to the failure of the liberal Revolutions of 1848 in Europe and they also alleged that he was an enemy of liberty and democracy. One Boston minister described Catholicism as "the ally of tyranny, the opponent of material prosperity, the foe of thrift, the enemy of the railroad, the caucus, and the school". These fears encouraged conspiracy theories regarding papal intentions of subjugating the U.S. through a continuing influx of Catholics controlled by Irish bishops obedient to and personally selected by the Pope.

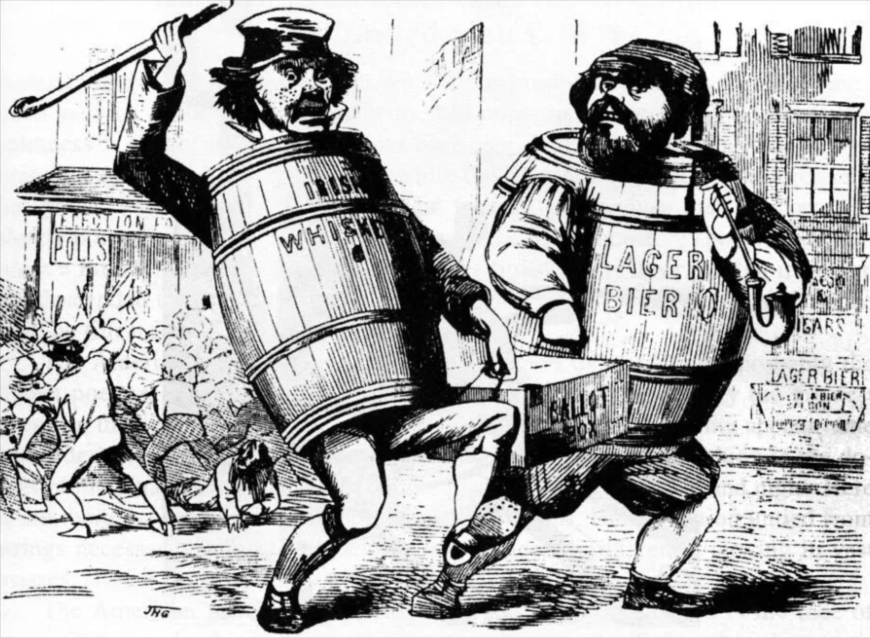
1850s political cartoon by John H. Goater: Irish and German caricatures "stealing an election" with chaos at the "Election Day Polls" site, fueling fears of immigrant political power

In 1849, an oath-bound secret society, the Order of the Star Spangled Banner, was founded by Charles B. Allen in New York City. At its inception, the Order of the Star Spangled Banner only had about 36 members. Fear of Catholic immigration caused some Protestants to become dissatisfied with the Democratic Party, whose leaders included Catholics of Irish descent in many cities. Activists formed secret groups, coordinating their votes and throwing their weight behind candidates who were sympathetic to their cause:

Immigration during the first five years of the 1850s reached a level five times greater than a decade earlier. Most of the new arrivals were poor Catholic peasants or laborers from Ireland and Germany who crowded the tenements of large cities. Crime and welfare costs soared. Cincinnati's crime rate, for example, tripled between 1846 and 1853 and its murder rate increased sevenfold. Boston's expenditures for poor relief rose threefold during the same period.

Unlike later antisemitic nativist groups in the U.S., and despite their zealous xenophobia and religious bigotry, the Know Nothings did not focus their ire on Jews or Judaism. Prioritizing a zealous disdain for Irish, German and French Catholic immigrants, the Know Nothing Party "had nothing to say about Jews", according to historian Hasia Diner, reportedly because its backers believed Jews, unlike Catholics, did not allow "their religious feelings to interfere with their political views." In New York, the party supported a Jewish candidate for governor, Daniel Ullman, in 1854. Lewis Charles Levin was Jewish.

=== Rise ===
In the spring of 1854, the Know Nothings carried Boston and Salem, Massachusetts, and other New England cities. They swept the state of Massachusetts in the fall 1854 elections, their biggest victory. The Whig candidate for mayor of Philadelphia, editor Robert T. Conrad, was soon revealed as a Know Nothing as he promised to crack down on crime, close saloons on Sundays and only appoint native-born Americans to office—he won the election by a landslide. In Washington, D.C., Know Nothing candidate John T. Towers defeated incumbent Mayor John Walker Maury, triggering opposition of such a high proportion that the Democrats, Whigs, and Freesoilers in the capital united as the "Anti-Know-Nothing Party". In New York, where James Harper had been elected mayor of New York City as an American Republican almost a decade before, the Know Nothing candidate Daniel Ullman came in third in a four-way race for governor by gathering 26% of the vote. After the 1854 elections, they exerted a large amount of political influence in Maine, Indiana, Pennsylvania, and California, but historians are unsure about the accuracy of this information due to the secrecy of the party, because all parties were in turmoil and the anti-slavery and prohibition issues overlapped with nativism in complex and confusing ways. They helped elect Stephen Palfrey Webb as mayor of San Francisco and they also helped elect J. Neely Johnson as governor of California. Nathaniel P. Banks was elected to Congress as a Know Nothing candidate, but after a few months he aligned with Republicans. A coalition of Know Nothings, Republicans and other members of Congress opposed to the Democratic Party elected Banks to the position of Speaker of the House.

The results of the 1854 elections were so favorable to the Know Nothings, up to then an informal movement with no centralized organization, that they formed officially as a political party called the American Party, which attracted many members of the by then nearly defunct Whig party as well as a significant number of Democrats. Membership in the American Party increased dramatically, from 50,000 to an estimated one million plus in a matter of months during that year.

The historian Tyler Anbinder concluded:

The key to Know Nothing success in 1854 was the collapse of the second party system, brought about primarily by the demise of the Whig Party. The Whig Party, weakened for years by internal dissent and chronic factionalism, was nearly destroyed by the Kansas–Nebraska Act. Growing anti-party sentiment, fueled by anti-slavery sentiment as well as temperance and nativism, also contributed to the disintegration of the party system. The collapsing second party system gave the Know Nothings a much larger pool of potential converts than was available to previous nativist organizations, allowing the Order to succeed where older nativist groups had failed.

In San Francisco, a Know Nothing chapter was founded in 1854 to oppose Chinese immigration—members included a judge of the state supreme court, who ruled that no Chinese person could testify as a witness against a white man in court. The Know Nothing party tried passing multiple bills in Congress that would hinder the acceptance of certain immigrants into the U.S., but the laws were never passed since the party was slowly declining during 1855.

In the Know Nothing Platform, an 1855 anonymous anti-Catholic book, the self-described Know-Nothing author argued for restricting the political rights of Irish immigrants. The book compared the United States to a business, asserting that just as a firm would not admit someone “totally ignorant of its principles,” immigrants should not be entrusted with voting or governance:

And is it to be supposed that an ignorant, bog-trotting Irishman, who after years of instruction, can scarcely be taught to shoe a horse—the moment he is imported from Ireland, under the auspices of Archbishop Hughes, to be put up for sale, to the highest bid of profligate politicians—is competent to understand and control, for the good of the community, our complicated system of government and policy?

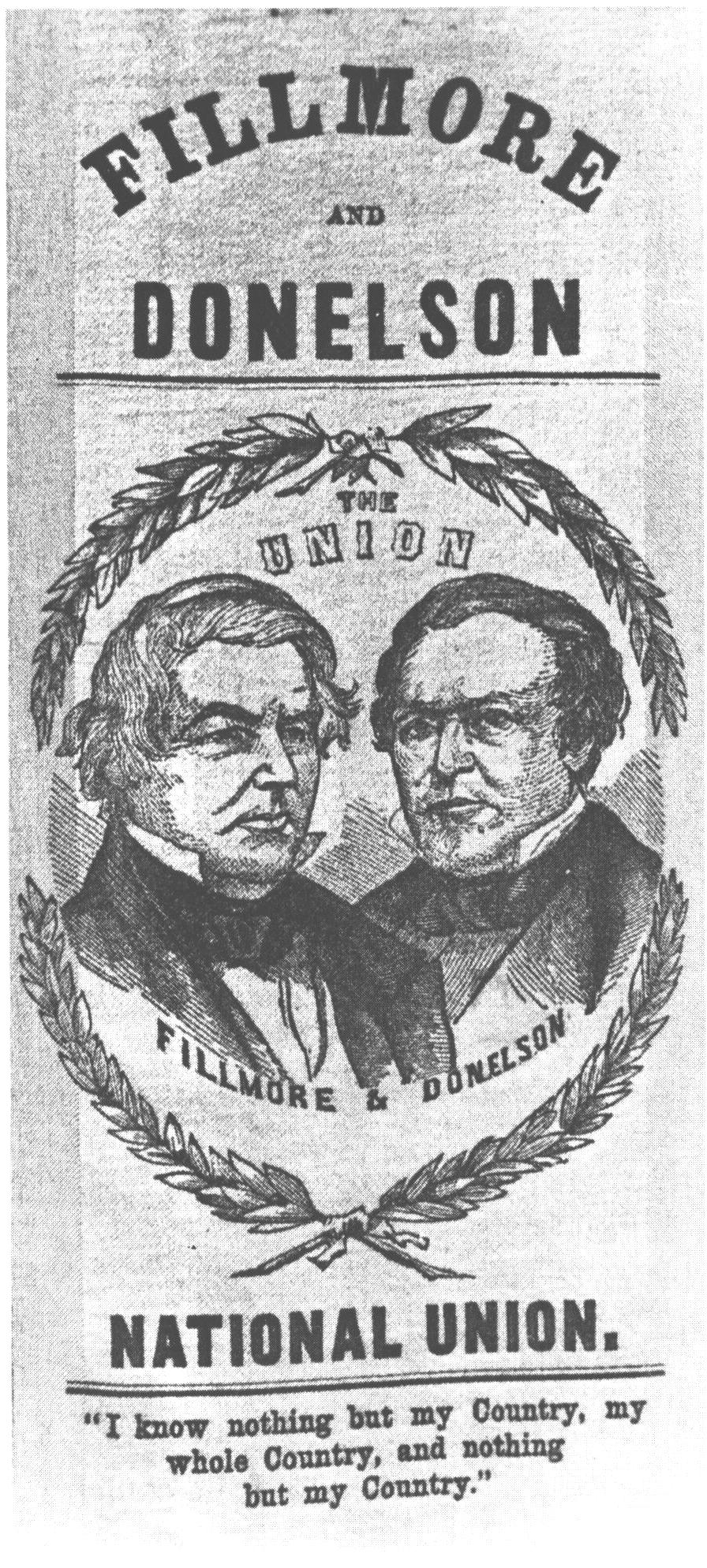
Fillmore–Donelson campaign poster

In the spring of 1855, Know Nothing candidate Levi Boone was elected mayor of Chicago and barred all immigrants from city jobs. Abraham Lincoln was strongly opposed to the principles of the Know Nothing movement, but did not denounce it publicly because he needed the votes of its membership to form a successful anti-slavery coalition in Illinois. Ohio was the only state where the party gained strength in 1855. Their Ohio success seems to have come from winning over immigrants, especially German-American Lutherans and Scots-Irish Presbyterians, both hostile to Catholicism. In Alabama, Know Nothings were a mix of former Whigs, discontented Democrats and other political outsiders who favored state aid to build more railroads. Virginia attracted national attention in its tempestuous 1855 gubernatorial election. Democrat Henry Alexander Wise won by convincing state voters that Know Nothings were in bed with Northern abolitionists. With the victory by Wise, the movement began to collapse in the South.

Know Nothings scored victories in Northern state elections in 1854, winning control of the legislature in Massachusetts and polling 40% of the vote in Pennsylvania. Although most of the new immigrants lived in the North, resentment and anger against them was national and the American Party initially polled well in the South, attracting the votes of many former southern Whigs.

The party name gained wide, but brief, popularity: Know Nothing candy, tea, and toothpicks appeared, and the name was given to stagecoaches, buses, and ships. In Trescott, Maine, a shipowner dubbed his new 700-ton freighter Know-Nothing. The party was occasionally referred to, contemporaneously, in a slightly pejorative shortening, "Knism".

=== Leadership and legislation ===
Historian John Mulkern has examined the party's success in sweeping to almost complete control of the Massachusetts legislature after its 1854 landslide victory. He finds the new party was populist and highly democratic, hostile to wealth, elites and to expertise, and deeply suspicious of outsiders, especially Catholics. The new party's voters were concentrated in the rapidly growing industrial towns, where Yankee workers faced direct competition with new Irish immigrants. Whereas the Whig Party was strongest in high income districts, the Know Nothing electorate was strongest in the poor districts. They expelled the traditional upper-class, closed, political leadership, especially the lawyers and merchants. In their stead, they elected working-class men, farmers and a large number of teachers and ministers. Replacing the moneyed elite were men who seldom owned $10,000 in property.

Nationally, the new party leadership showed incomes, occupation, and social status that were about average. Few were wealthy, according to detailed historical studies of once-secret membership rosters. Fewer than 10% were unskilled workers who might come in direct competition with Irish laborers. They enlisted few farmers, but on the other hand they included many merchants and factory owners. The party's voters were by no means all native-born Americans, for it won more than a fourth of the German and British Protestants in numerous state elections. It especially appealed to Protestants such as the Lutherans, Dutch Reformed and Presbyterians.

=== Violence ===
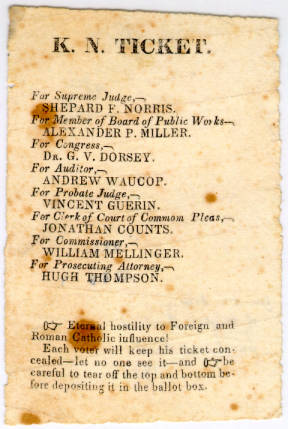
An 1855 Ohio Know Nothing Party ticket naming party candidates for state and county offices. At the bottom of the page are voting instructions.

Fearful that Catholics were flooding the polls with non-citizens, local activists threatened to stop them. On August 6, 1855, rioting broke out in Louisville, Kentucky, during a hotly contested race for the office of governor. Twenty-two were killed and many injured. This "Bloody Monday" riot was not the only violent riot by Know Nothings against Catholics in 1855. In Baltimore, the mayoral elections of 1856, 1857 and 1858 were all marred by violence and well-founded accusations of ballot-rigging by the Know Nothings. In the coastal town of Ellsworth, Maine, in 1854, Know Nothings were associated with the tarring and feathering of the Jesuit priest Johannes Bapst. They also burned down a Catholic church in Bath, Maine.

=== New England ===
==== Massachusetts ====
The most aggressive and innovative legislation came out of Massachusetts, where the new party controlled all but three of the 400 seats—only 35 had any previous legislative experience. The Massachusetts legislature in 1855 passed a series of reforms that "burst the dam against change erected by party politics, and released a flood of reforms". The period from 1854 to 1857 saw among Massachusetts Know Nothings a decline in the traditional nativist wing of the party and the rise of the group of abolitionists and reformers, including former Massachusetts Senate President Henry Wilson, looking to redirect the focus of the party. Historian Stephen Taylor says that in addition to nativist legislation, "the party also distinguished itself by its opposition to slavery, support for an expansion of the rights of women, regulation of industry, and support of measures designed to improve the status of working people".

It passed legislation to regulate railroads, insurance companies and public utilities. It funded free textbooks for the public schools and raised the appropriations for local libraries and for the school for the blind. Purification of Massachusetts against divisive social evils was a high priority. The legislature set up the state's first reform school for juvenile delinquents while trying to block the importation of supposedly subversive government documents and academic books from Europe. It upgraded the legal status of wives, giving them more property rights and more rights in divorce courts. It passed harsh penalties on speakeasies, gambling houses and bordellos. It passed prohibition legislation with penalties that were so stiff—such as six months in prison for serving one glass of beer—that juries refused to convict defendants. Many of the reforms were quite expensive; state spending rose 45% on top of a 50% hike in annual taxes on cities and towns. This extravagance angered the taxpayers, and few Know Nothings were reelected. These successes at enacting reform legislation came at the expense of the traditional nativist priorities of the party, causing some national Know Nothing leaders, like Samuel Morse, to question the Massachusetts party's aims.

The Massachusetts Know Nothings did advance attacks on the civil rights of Irish Catholic immigrants. After this, state courts lost the power to process applications for citizenship and public schools had to require compulsory daily reading of the Protestant Bible (which the nativists were sure would transform the Catholic children). The governor disbanded the Irish militias and replaced Irish holding state jobs with Protestants. However, Know Nothing lawmakers failed to reach the two-thirds majority needed to pass a state constitutional amendment to restrict voting and office holding to men who had resided in Massachusetts for at least 21 years. The legislature then called on Congress to raise the requirement for naturalization from five years to 21 years, but Congress never acted. The most dramatic move by the Know Nothing legislature was to appoint an investigating committee designed to prove widespread sexual immorality underway in Catholic convents. The press had a field day following the story, especially when it was discovered that the key reformer was using committee funds to pay for a prostitute. The legislature shut down its committee, ejected the reformer, and saw its investigation become a laughing stock.

==== New Hampshire and Rhode Island ====
The Know Nothings scored a landslide in New Hampshire in 1855. They won 51% of the vote, including 94% of the anti-slavery Free Soilers, and 79% of the Whigs, plus 15% of Democrats and 24% of those who abstained in the previous election for governor the year before. In full control of the legislature, the Know Nothings enacted their entire agenda. According to Lex Renda, they battled traditionalism and promoted rapid modernization. They extended the waiting period for citizenship to slow down the growth of Irish power; they reformed the state courts. They expanded the number and power of banks; they strengthened corporations; they defeated a proposed 10-hour workday law. They reformed the tax system, increased state spending on public schools, set up a system to build high schools, prohibited the sale of liquor, and denounced the expansion of slavery in the western territories.

The Whigs and Free Soil parties both collapsed in New Hampshire in 1854–55. In the 1855 fall elections the Know Nothings again swept New Hampshire against the Democrats and the small new Republican party. When the Know Nothing "American Party" collapsed in 1856 and merged with the Republicans, New Hampshire now had a two party system with the Republicans edging out the Democrats.

The Know Nothings also dominated politics in Rhode Island, where in 1855 William W. Hoppin held the governorship and five out of every seven votes went to the party, which dominated the Rhode Island legislature. Local newspapers such as The Providence Journal fueled anti-Irish and anti-Catholic sentiment.

=== South ===
In the Southern U.S., the American Party was composed chiefly of ex-Whigs looking for a vehicle to fight the dominant Democratic Party and worried about both the pro-slavery extremism of the Democrats and the emergence of the anti-slavery Republican party in the North. In the South as a whole, the American Party was strongest among former Unionist Whigs. States-rightist Whigs shunned it, enabling the Democrats to win most of the South. Whigs supported the American Party because of their desire to defeat the Democrats, their unionist sentiment, their anti-immigrant attitudes, and their neutrality on the slavery issue.

David T. Gleeson notes that many Irish Catholics in the South feared that the arrival of the Know-Nothing movement portended a serious threat. He argues:

The southern Irish, who had seen the dangers of Protestant bigotry in Ireland, had the distinct feeling that the Know-Nothings were an American manifestation of that phenomenon. Every migrant, no matter how settled or prosperous, also worried that this virulent strain of nativism threatened his or her hard-earned gains in the South and integration into its society. Immigrants fears were unjustified, however, because the national debate over slavery and its expansion, not nativism or anti-Catholicism, was the major reason for Know-Nothing success in the South. The southerners who supported the Know-Nothings did so, for the most part, because they thought the Democrats who favored the expansion of slavery might break up the Union.

In 1855, the American Party challenged the Democrats' dominance. In Alabama, the Know Nothings were a mix of former Whigs, malcontented Democrats and other political misfits; they favored state aid to build more railroads. In the fierce campaign, the Democrats argued that Know Nothings could not protect slavery from Northern abolitionists. The Know Nothing American Party disintegrated soon after losing in 1855.

In Virginia, the Know Nothing movement came under sharp attack from both established parties. Democrats published a 12,000-word, point-by-point denunciation of Know Nothingism. The Democrats nominated ex-Whig Henry A. Wise for governor. He denounced the "lousy, godless, Christless" Know Nothings and instead he advocated an expanded program of internal improvements.

In Maryland, growing anti-immigrant sentiment fueled the party's rise. Despite the state's Catholic roots, by the 1850s about 60 percent of the population was Protestant and open to the Know Nothing's anti-Catholic, anti-immigrant appeal. On August 18, 1853, the party held its first rally in Baltimore with about 5,000 in attendance, calling for secularization of public schools, complete separation of church and state, freedom of speech, and regulating immigration. The first Know-Nothing candidate elected into office in Baltimore was Mayor Samuel Hinks in 1855. The following year, ethnic and secular conflicts fueled riots around municipal and federal elections in Maryland with Know-Nothing–affiliated gangs clashing with Democratic-aligned gangs.

Historian Michael F. Holt argues that "Know Nothingism originally grew in the South for the same reasons it spread in the North—nativism, anti-Catholicism, and animosity toward unresponsive politicos—not because of conservative Unionism". Holt cites William B. Campbell, former governor of Tennessee, who wrote in January 1855: "I have been astonished at the widespread feeling in favor of their principles—to wit, Native Americanism and anti-Catholicism—it takes everywhere". Despite this, in Louisiana and Maryland, prominent Know Nothings remained loyal to the Union. In Maryland, American Party's former governor and later senator Thomas Holliday Hicks, Representative Henry Winter Davis, and Senator Anthony Kennedy, along with his brother, former Representative John Pendleton Kennedy, all supported the Union in a border state. Louisiana Know Nothing congressman John Edward Bouligny, a Catholic Creole, was the only member of the Louisiana congressional delegation who refused to resign his seat after the state seceded from the Union.

==== Louisiana ====
Despite the national American Party's anti-Catholicism, the Know Nothings found strong support in Louisiana, including in largely Catholic New Orleans. The Whig Party in Louisiana had a strong anti-immigrant bent, making the Native American Party the natural home for Louisiana's former Whigs. Louisiana Know Nothings were pro-slavery and anti-immigrant, but, in contrast to the national party, refused to include a religious test for membership. Instead, the Louisiana Know Nothings insisted that "loyalty to a church should not supersede loyalty to the Union." Similarly, the broader Know Nothing movement viewed Louisiana Catholics, and in particular the Creole elite who supported the American Party, as adhering to a Gallican Catholicism and therefore opposed to papal authority over matters of state.

=== Decline ===
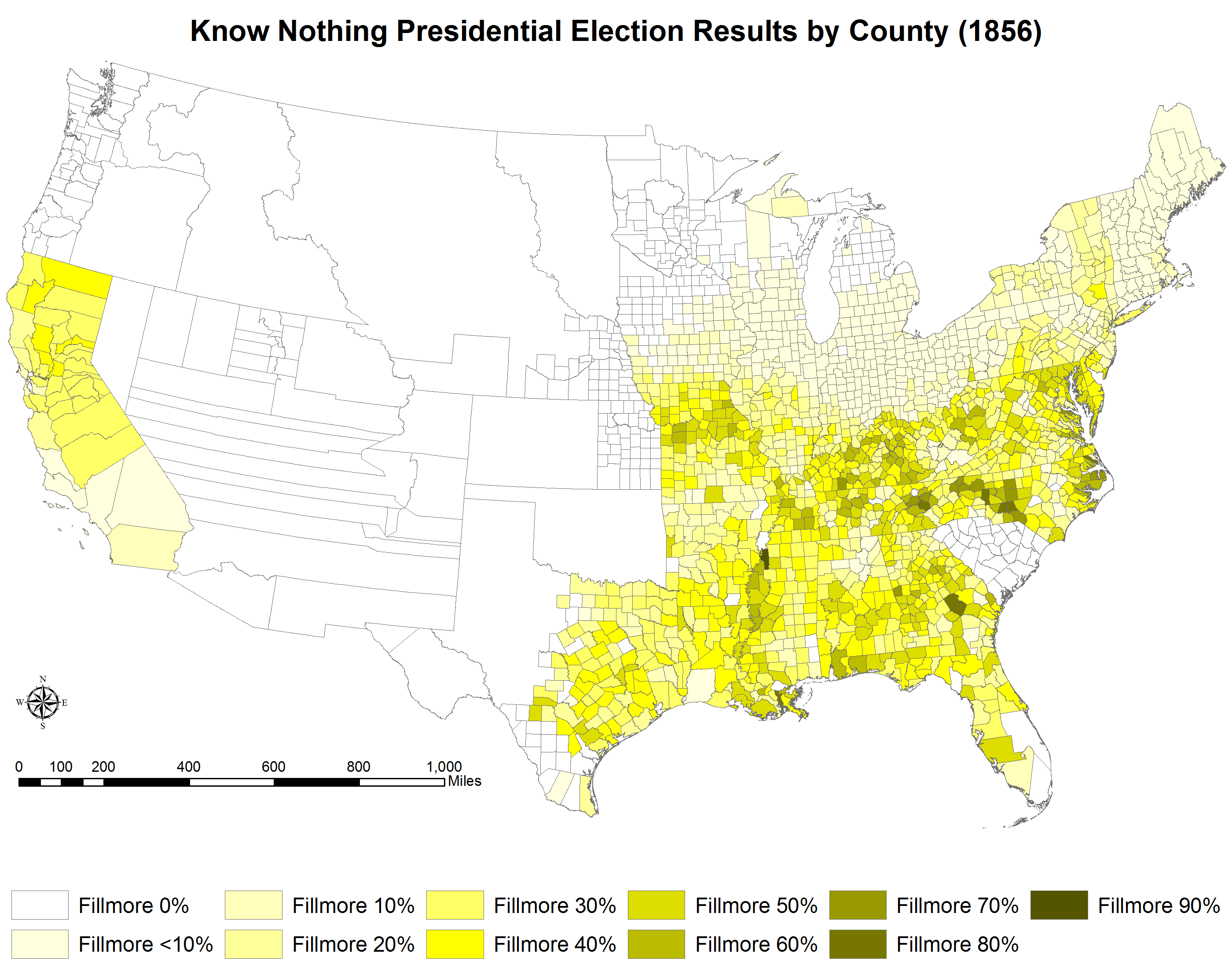
Results by county indicating the percentage for Fillmore in each county

The party declined rapidly in the North after 1855, in part due to the party's rejection of a clear anti-slavery platform. During the presidential election of 1856, the party was bitterly divided over slavery. The main faction supported the ticket of presidential nominee Millard Fillmore and vice presidential nominee Andrew Jackson Donelson. In Massachusetts, for example, the American Party ran Republican candidate John C. Frémont as its presidential nominee.

Fillmore, a former president, had been a Whig and Donelson was the nephew of Democratic President Andrew Jackson, so the ticket was designed to appeal to loyalists from both major parties, winning 23% of the popular vote and carrying one state, Maryland, with eight electoral votes. Fillmore did not win enough votes to block Democrat James Buchanan from the White House.

Many were appalled by the Know Nothings. While Abraham Lincoln never publicly attacked the Know Nothings, whose votes he needed, he expressed his own disgust with the political party in a private letter to Joshua Speed, written August 24, 1855:

I am not a Know-Nothing– That is certain– How could I be? How can any one who abhors the oppression of negroes, be in favor of degrading classes of white people? Our progress in degeneracy appears to me to be pretty rapid– As a nation, we began by declaring that "all men are created equal" We now practically read it "all men are created equal, except negroes." When the Know-Nothings get control, it will read "all men are created equal, except negroes, and foreigners, and catholics". When it comes to this I should prefer emigrating to some country where they make no pretence [sic] of loving liberty—to Russia, for instance, where despotism can be taken pure, and without the base alloy of hypocracy– [sic]

Historian Allan Nevins, writing about the turmoil preceding the American Civil War, states that Millard Fillmore was never a Know Nothing nor a nativist. Fillmore was out of the country when the presidential nomination came and had not been consulted about running. Nevins further states:

[Fillmore] was not a member of the party; he had never attended an American [Know-Nothing] gathering. By no spoken or written word had he indicated a subscription to American [Party] tenets.

However, Fillmore had sent a letter for publication in 1855 that explicitly denounced immigrant influence in elections and Fillmore stated that the American Party was the "only hope of forming a truly national party, which shall ignore this constant and distracting agitation of slavery."

After the Supreme Court's controversial Dred Scott v. Sandford ruling in 1857, most of the anti-slavery members of the American Party joined the Republican Party. The pro-slavery wing of the American Party remained strong on the local and state levels in a few southern states, but by the 1860 election they were no longer a serious national political movement. Most of their remaining members supported the Constitutional Union Party in 1860.

== Electoral results ==
=== Federal elections ===
U.S. Presidency
Year	Nominee	Running-mate	# votes	% votes (Nationally)	% votes (Where Balloted)	Electoral votes	Place	Performance Map
1848	Zachary Taylor	Henry A.S. Dearborn	Withdrew endorsement of Zachary Taylor and Henry Dearborn after Taylor's nomination at the 1848 Whig National Convention					
1852	Jacob Broom (Note: Replacing Daniel Webster; Webster had died on October 24th.)	Reynell Coates (Note: Replacing George C. Washington)	1,836	0.06 / 100 (Note: Of 3,159,640 votes)	0.36 / 100 (Note: Of 514,942 votes)	0 / 296	6th	
1856	Millard Fillmore	Andrew J. Donelson	872,703	21.54 / 100 (Note: Of 4,051,605 votes)		8 / 296	3rd	

U.S. House of Representatives
Election	Nominees (and Endorsees)	Votes				Seats				Control	Performance Map
Election	Nominees (and Endorsees)	No.	Share	Share (Where Contesting)	Share (Total)	No.	±	No. (Party and Endorsed)	±	Control	Performance Map
1844-1845	12 A	53,413	2.09 / 100 (Note: Of 2,558,675 votes)	36.33 / 100 (Note: Of 147,038 votes)	2.09 / 100 (Note: Of 2,558,675 votes)	6 / 228	▲6	6 / 228	▲6	Democratic	
1844-1845	Candidate Performance: MD-4 ▌John M. Duncan – 1,147 votes – (9.61%); NY-2 ▌Henry J. Seaman – 6,164 votes – (51.75%); NY-3 ▌William S. Miller – 6,613 votes – (54.71%); NY-4 ▌Samuel S. Lawrence – 6,428 votes – (48.35%); NY-5 ▌Thomas M. Woodruff – 6,214 votes – (49.73%); NY-6 ▌William W. Campbell – 7,856 votes – (48.82%); PA-1 ▌Lewis C. Levin – 3,815 votes – (42.58%); PA-2 ▌Joseph W. Ashmead – 3,113 votes – (25.73%); PA-3 ▌John H. Campbell – 5,281 votes – (52.10%); PA-4 ▌Jacob Shearer – 4,060 votes – (41.11%); PA-5 ▌J. Jenkins Ross – 148 votes – (1.12%); PA-8 ▌Henry Witmer – 2,574 votes – (17.21%)				2.09 / 100	6 / 228	▲6	6 / 228	▲6	Democratic	
1846-1847	23 A	28,469	1.22 / 100 (Note: Of 2,327,159 votes)	11.88 / 100 (Note: Of 239,600 votes)	1.22 / 100 (Note: Of 2,327,159 votes)	1 / 230	▼5	1 / 230	▼5	Whig	
1846-1847	Candidate Performance: KY-8 ▌S.F. Trabue – 3,143 votes – (29.85%); MA-2 ▌Increase H. Brown – 562 votes – (6.05%); MA-4 ▌Wilder S. Thurson – 541 votes – (4.64%); MA-5 ▌Seth Alden – 271 votes – (2.27%); MA-9 ▌Job Terry – 152 votes – (1.55%); MA-10 ▌Abraham H. Howland – 200 votes – (3.31%); NJ-1 ▌Charles J. Hollis – 1,151 votes – (10.49%); NJ-2 ▌FNU Ridson – 280 votes – (2.03%); NY-2 ▌Henry J. Seaman – 691 votes – (6.08%); NY-3 ▌William S. Miller – 262 votes – (2.76%); NY-4 ▌William L. Prawl – 865 votes – (8.40); NY-5 ▌David E. Wheeler – 1,493 votes – (14.96%); NY-6 ▌William W. Campbell – 1,841 votes – (13.15%); NY-8 ▌Charles Haight – 1,209 votes – (10.18%); NY-9 ▌Peter Roe – 63 votes – (0.58%); PA-1 ▌Lewis C. Levin – 3,574 votes – (39.47%); PA-2 ▌Joseph W. Ashmead – 2,422 votes – (24.79%); PA-3 ▌W. Hollinshead – 4,370 votes – (38.91%); PA-4 ▌John S. Littell – 3,296 votes – (34.66%); PA-5 ▌Paul B. Carter – 200 votes – (2.34%); PA-8 ▌Emanuel C. Reigart – 823 votes – (11.41%); PA-14 ▌F.M. Wynkoop – 554 votes – (5.12%); PA-21 ▌Thomas Howard – 506 votes – (4.82%)				1.22 / 100	1 / 230	▼5	1 / 230	▼5	Whig	
1848-1849	4 A	10,539	0.38 / 100 (Note: Of 2,739,941 votes)	21.87 / 100 (Note: Of 48,188 votes)	0.38 / 100 (Note: Of 2,739,941 votes)	1 / 233	Steady	1 / 233	Steady	Democratic	
1848-1849	Candidate Performance: KY-8 ▌S.F. Trabue – 4,665 votes – (47.31%); NJ-1 ▌Charles J. Hollis – 718 votes – (5.20%); PA-1 ▌Lewis C. Levin – 4,897 votes – (51.89%); PA-21 ▌Israel Cullen – 259 votes – (1.72%)				0.38 / 100	1 / 233	Steady	1 / 233	Steady	Democratic	
1850-1851	4 A	5,909	0.23 / 100 (Note: Of 2,599,492 votes)	13.50 / 100 (Note: Of 43,755 votes)	0.23 / 100 (Note: Of 2,599,492 votes)	0 / 233	▼1	0 / 233	▼1	Democratic	
1850-1851	Candidate Performance: NJ-1 ▌Joseph Franklin – 1,084 votes – (8.10%); PA-1 ▌Lewis C. Levin – 4,161 votes – (41.13%); PA-2 ▌William H. Brinckle – 122 votes – (1.25%); PA-21 ▌Israel Cullen – 539 votes – (5.14%)				0.23 / 100	0 / 233	▼1	0 / 233	▼1	Democratic	
1852-1853	9 A	9,639	0.30 / 100 (Note: Of 3,161,963 votes)	8.26 / 100 (Note: Of 116,658 votes)	0.30 / 100 (Note: Of 3,161,963 votes)	0 / 234	Steady	0 / 234	Steady	Democratic	
1852-1853	Candidate Performance: NJ-1 ▌Joseph Franklin – 905 votes – (6.06%); NJ-2 ▌Daniel Busby – 134 votes – (0.68%); NY-20 ▌James C. Delong – 310 votes – (1.83%); PA-1 ▌Lewis C. Levin – 2,953 votes – (26.63%); PA-2 ▌Charles Taylor – 413 votes – (3.91%); PA-3 ▌John S. Painter – 2,206 votes – (19.41%); PA-4 ▌Oliver P. Cornman – 2,063 votes – (16.43%); PA-21 ▌Jared Wickersham – 276 votes – (2.65%); PA-22 ▌Jacob Shamer – 379 votes – (4.13%)				0.30 / 100	0 / 234	Steady	0 / 234	Steady	Democratic	
1854-1855	101 A	626,586	19.39 / 100 (Note: Of 3,231,368 votes)	49.12 / 100 (Note: Of 1,275,574 votes)	20.14 / 100 (Note: Of 3,231,368 votes)	52 / 234	▲52	56 / 234	▲56	Opposition	
1854-1855	Candidate Performance: AL-1 ▌Percy Walker – 5,653 votes – (52.40%); AL-2 ▌Julius C. Alford – 5,520 votes – (45.11%); AL-3 ▌Thomas H. Watts – 5,808 votes – (47.80%); AL-4 ▌William R. Smith – 5,787 votes – (59.83%); AL-6 ▌James M. Adams – 3,697 votes – (37.13%); AL-7 ▌William B. Martin – 5,220 votes – (42.72%); CT-1 ▌Ezra Clark Jr. – 8,521 votes – (52.11%); CT-2 ▌John Woodruff – 9,876 votes – (55.50%); CT-3 ▌Sidney Dean – 8,055 votes – (67.51%); CT-4 ▌William W. Welch – 9,701 votes – (56.07%); DE-AL ▌Elisha D. Cullen – 6,820 votes – (51.85%); GA-1 ▌Samuel Varnadoe – 4,544 votes – (42.38%); GA-2 ▌Willis Hawkins – 7,153 votes – (48.01%); GA-3 ▌Robert P. Trippe – 6,112 votes – (53.96%); GA-4 ▌Benjamin Hill – 6,813 votes – (49.74%); GA-5 ▌Lewis Tumlin – 7,973 votes – (41.39%); GA-6 ▌Leonidas Franklin – 5,227 votes – (36.22%); GA-7 ▌Nathaniel G. Foster – 4,792 votes – (51.13%); GA-8 ▌Lafyette Lamar – 3,079 votes – (34.65%); KY-1 ▌W.G. Hughes – 5,708 votes – (37.97%); KY-2 ▌John P. Campbell Jr. – 7,533 votes – (55.29%); KY-3 ▌Warner Underwood – 7,362 votes – (56.88%); KY-4 ▌Fountain T. Fox – 6,570 votes – (49.94%); KY-5 ▌C.G. Wintersmith – 6,628 votes – (48.37%); KY-6 ▌George W. Dunlap – 6,340 votes – (45.20%); KY-7 ▌Humphrey Marshall – 6,932 votes – (61.29%); KY-8 ▌Alexander K. Marshall – 7,039 votes – (55.98%); KY-9 ▌Leander Cox – 8,085 votes – (55.06%); KY-10 ▌Samuel F. Swope – 7,490 votes – (51.72%); LA-1 ▌George Eustis Jr. – 2,588 votes – (53.40%); LA-2 ▌Theodore G. Hunt – 5,811 votes – (48.46%); LA-3 ▌Preston Pond – 4,616 votes – (49.38%); LA-4 ▌William B. Lewis – 6,461 votes – (41.95%); MD-1 ▌John Dennis – 5,868 votes – (48.73%); MD-2 ▌James B. Ricaud – 8,484 votes – (56.58%); MD-3 ▌J. Morrison Harris – 6,538 votes – (50.21%); MD-4 ▌Henry W. Davis – 7,988 votes – (51.60%); MD-5 ▌Henry W. Hoffman – 8,320 votes – (52.36%); MD-6 ▌William Watkins – 4,746 votes – (46.07%); MA-1 ▌Robert B. Hall – 5,353 votes – (63.70%); MA-2 ▌James Buffington – 8,064 votes – (68.25%); MA-3 ▌William S. Damrell – 8,668 votes – (74.76%); MA-4 ▌Linus B. Comins – 4,972 votes – (57.45%); MA-5 ▌Anson Burlingame – 5,967 votes – (61.64%); MA-6 ▌Timothy Davis – 7,428 votes – (65.39%); MA-7 ▌Nathaniel P. Banks – 8,928 votes – (73.22%); MA-8 ▌Chauncey L. Knapp – 7,004 votes – (62.80%); MA-9 ▌Alexander De Witt – 8,795 votes – (76.97%); MA-10 ▌Henry Morris – 7,723 votes – (65.35%); MA-11 ▌Mark Trafton – 6,640 votes – (50.52%); MS-1 ▌J.H. Taylor – 5,731 votes – (44.47%); MS-2 ▌L.E. Houston – 5,554 votes – (48.36%); MS-3 ▌Joseph B. Cobb – 5,894 votes – (44.52%); MS-4 ▌William A. Lake – 5,907 votes – (50.76%); MS-5 ▌Giles M. Hillyer – 4,489 votes – (40.69%); NH-1 ▌James Pike – 12,619 votes – (56.29%); NH-2 ▌Mason Tappan – 12,129 votes – (58.37%); NH-3 ▌Aaron H. Cragin – 12126 votes – (58.40%); NY-1 ▌William Valk – 4,215 votes – (30.97%); NY-4 ▌John W. Bryce – 626 votes – (8.27%); NY-5 ▌Thomas R. Whitney – 3,320 votes – (30.86%); NY-9 ▌Bayard Clarke – 7,764 votes – (59.56%); NY-14 ▌John W. Harcourt – 4,270 votes – (28.45%); NY-16 ▌Jerome B. Bailey – 3,121 votes – (27.06%); NY-24 ▌B. Davis Noxon – 3,409 votes – (26.62%); NY-33 ▌Francis S. Edwards – 8,359 votes – (55.49%); NC-1 ▌Robert T. Paine – 5,228 votes – (51.71%); NC-2 ▌Thomas J. Latham – 3,464 votes – (33.95%); NC-3 ▌David Reid – 4,863 votes – (45.06%); NC-4 ▌James B. Shepard – 4,223 votes – (38.33%); NC-5 ▌Edwin G. Reade – 7,061 votes – (65.28%); NC-6 ▌Richard C. Puryear – 6,516 votes – (51.45%); NC-7 ▌Samuel N. Stowe – 4,104 votes – (37.83%); NC-8 ▌Leander B. Carmichael – 6,584 votes – (44.90%); PA-4 ▌Jacob Broom – 6,747 votes – (49.63%); PA-11 ▌Kimber Klever – 354 votes – (2.56%); PA-22 ▌I.T. Robinson – 188 votes – (1.86%); RI-E ▌Nathan B. Durfee – 6,283 votes – (75.97%); RI-W ▌Benjamin B. Thurston – 4,484 votes – (88.30%); TN-1 ▌Nathaniel G. Taylor – 7,511 votes – (48.57%); TN-2 ▌William H. Sneed – 6,249 votes – (52.35%); TN-3 ▌Josiah M. Anderson – 7,331 votes – (48.22%); TN-4 ▌William Cullom – 5,563 votes – (48.04%); TN-5 ▌Charles Ready – 7,069 votes – (91.79%); TN-6 ▌Powhattan Gordon – 4,245 votes – (33.37%); TN-7 ▌William Kendrick – 5,922 votes – (42.76%); TN-8 ▌Felix Zollicoffer – 6,958 votes – (58.89%); TN-9 ▌Emerson Etheridge – 7,952 votes – (51.82%); TN-10 ▌Thomas Rivers – 5,860 votes – (53.29%); TX-1 ▌Lemuel D. Evans – 10,352 votes – (50.10%); TX-2 ▌John Hancock – 9,427 votes – (39.24%); VA-2 ▌FNU Watts – 4,141 votes – (?%); VA-3 ▌W.C. Scott – 5,466 votes – (47.88%); VA-4 ▌L. Tazewell – 2,700 votes – (?%); VA-5 ▌N.C. Claiborne – 5,142 votes – (42.75%); VA-6 ▌FNU Ligon – 2,976 votes – (?%); VA-8 ▌Alexander R. Boteler – 6,959 votes – (49.29%); VA-10 ▌William K. Pendleton – 6,248 votes – (45.50%); VA-11 ▌John S. Carlile – 8,333 votes – (51.20%); VA-12 ▌W.R. Staples – 6,385 votes – (46.10%); VA-13 ▌FNU Trigg – 3,525 votes – (?%)				20.14 / 100	52 / 234	▲52	56 / 234	▲56	Opposition	
1854-1855	3 D, 2 W	24,352	0.75 / 100 (Note: Of 3,231,368 votes)	43.92 / 100 (Note: Of 55,449 votes)	20.14 / 100	4 / 234	▲4	56 / 234	▲56	Opposition	
1854-1855	Candidate Performance: NY-3 ▌Guy R. Pelton – 4,084 votes – (49.06%); NY-7 ▌Thomas Child Jr. – 6,557 votes – (56.29%); NY-26 ▌Andrew Oliver – 6,871 votes – (47.74%); NY-29 ▌John Williams – 5,609 votes – (47.94%); NY-31 ▌Alden S. Baker – 1,231 votes – (13.12%)				20.14 / 100	4 / 234	▲4	56 / 234	▲56	Opposition	
1856-1857	130 A	623,783	16.21 / 100 (Note: Of 3,847,162 votes)	30.53 / 100 (Note: Of 2,045,148 votes)	22.80 / 100 (Note: Of 3,847,162 votes)	14 / 236	▼38	24 / 236	▼32	Democratic	
1856-1857	Candidate Performance: AL-1 ▌John McCaskill – 4,310 votes – (38.05%); AL-2 ▌Batt Peterson – 4,464 votes – (37.57%); AL-3 ▌Thomas J. Judge – 6,418 votes – (45.44%); AL-4 ▌William R. Smith – 4,952 votes – (43.50%); AR-1 ▌Hugh A. Thomason – 6,361 votes – (28.91%); AR-2 ▌Absalom Fowler – 8,701 votes – (42.37%); CA-AL ▌B.C. Whitman – 36,078 votes – (33.37%); CA-AL ▌A.B. Dibble – 35,325 votes – (32.67%); DE-AL ▌Elisha D. Cullen – 6,360 votes – (43.95%); FL-AL ▌James M. Baker – 5,650 votes – (46.92%); GA-1 ▌F.L. Barrow – 5,082 votes – (44.39%); GA-2 ▌Samuel C. Elam – 6,365 votes – (43.94%); GA-3 ▌Robert P. Trippe – 5,803 votes – (51.69%); GA-4 ▌M.M. Tidwell – 6,939 votes – (46.42%); GA-7 ▌Joshua Hill – 4,800 votes – (51.47%); GA-8 ▌Thomas W. Miller – 3,870 votes – (42.90%); IL-1 ▌B.D. Eastman – 257 votes – (1.03%); IL-2 ▌Benjamin F. James – 685 votes – (2.14%); IL-4 ▌Arthur H. Griffith – 987 votes – (3.12%); IA-1 ▌John J. Selman – 826 votes – (2.29%); KY-1 ▌Owen Grimes – 2,945 votes – (24.68%); KY-2 ▌James L. Johnson – 6,173 votes – (46.12%); KY-3 ▌Warner Underwood – 6,359 votes – (50.81%); KY-4 ▌William C. Anderson – 6,861 votes – (49.41%); KY-5 ▌Bryan R. Young – 4,996 votes – (40.38%); KY-6 ▌John A. Moore – 5,950 votes – (44.34%); KY-7 ▌Humphrey Marshall – 6,085 votes – (55.00%); KY-8 ▌Roger W. Hanson – 6,451 votes – (49.52%); KY-9 ▌Leander Cox – 7,534 votes – (48.04%); KY-10 ▌William Rankin – 4,185 votes – (32.36%); LA-1 ▌George Eustis Jr. – 2,336 votes – (60.39%); LA-2 ▌Glendy Burke – 4,892 votes – (49.71%); LA-3 ▌George W. Waterson – 3,512 votes – (35.38%); LA-4 ▌W.H. Sparks – 5,205 votes – (36.48%); MD-1 ▌Teagle Townsend – 6,165 votes – (49.30%); MD-2 ▌James B. Ricaud – 8,751 votes – (52.42%); MD-3 ▌J. Morrison Harris – 8,761 votes – (61.63%); MD-4 ▌Henry W. Davis – 10,515 votes – (72.54%); MD-5 ▌Henry W. Hoffman – 8,208 votes – (49.49%); MD-6 ▌William J. Blackstone – 4,837 votes – (43.99%); MA-1 ▌Daniel Fisher – 1,601 votes – (14.12%); MA-2 ▌Darrius Dunbar – 1,132 votes – (7.03%); MA-3 ▌Alfred B. Ely – 1,435 votes – (8.47%); MA-4 ▌Benjamin F. Cooke – 1,678 votes – (14.85%); MA-5 ▌William Appleton – 6,513 votes – (49.74%); MA-6 ▌Benjmain Perley – 1,121 votes – (7.74%); MA-7 ▌Isaac Story – 2,049 votes – (11.74%); MA-8 ▌Abiel Lewis – 364 votes – (2.66%); MA-9 ▌Alexander De Witt – 4,414 votes – (26.57%); MA-10 ▌William C. Fowler – 4,081 votes – (27.34%); MA-11 ▌Mark Trafton – 4,194 votes – (27.41%); MO-1 ▌Luther M. Kennett – 5,549 votes – (40.31%); MO-2 ▌Thomas L. Anderson – 8,876 votes – (52.14%); MO-3 ▌James J. Lindley – 8,172 votes – (44.66%); MO-4 ▌James H. Moss – 6,274 votes – (40.76%); MO-5 ▌Samuel H. Woodson – 6,006 votes – (41.58%); MO-6 ▌Burr H. Emerson – 6,911 votes – (41.29%); MO-7 ▌David E. Perryman – 4,883 votes – (30.94%); MS-1 ▌James L. Alcorn – 2,738 votes – (36.24%); MS-2 ▌Charles Clark – 2,625 votes – (34.70%); MS-4 ▌William A. Lake – 5,130 votes – (44.96%); NJ-4 ▌Charles Ingalls – 2,335 votes – (13.54%); NJ-5 ▌Frederick B. Betts – 5,640 votes – (26.34%); NY-1 ▌Richard Jennings – 5,640 votes – (31.20%); NY-2 ▌Edward T. Wood – 5,476 votes – (26.00%); NY-3 ▌Augustine J. Duganne – 2,905 votes – (27.03%); NY-4 ▌W.F. Gould – 1,735 votes – (15.02%); NY-5 ▌Daniel L. Northrup – 3,798 votes – (26.93%); NY-6 ▌Asa Williams – 3,658 votes – (24.10%); NY-7 ▌George Briggs – 4,461 votes – (27.98%); NY-8 ▌Shepard Knapp – 3,651 votes – (24.52%); NY-9 ▌Marcius L. Cobb – 5,084 votes – (27.91%); NY-10 ▌Charles W. Trotter – 3,936 votes – (25.11%); NY-11 ▌John Fream – 5,902 votes – (33.36%); NY-12 ▌Isaac Teller – 3,116 votes – (15.32%); NY-13 ▌John I. Fonda – 4,108 votes – (29.19%); NY-14 ▌Eli Perry – 5,095 votes – (28.27%); NY-15 ▌John Cramer – 5,633 votes – (24.79%); NY-16 ▌Henry H. Ross – 4,129 votes – (27.00%); NY-18 ▌Abel Smith – 5,936 votes – (27.26%); NY-22 ▌James D. Colver – 1,671 votes – (7.55%); NY-24 ▌Henry G. Beach – 1,720 votes – (10.75%); NY-25 ▌William Fosgate – 3,644 votes – (18.26%); NY-26 ▌Andrew Oliver – 4,264 votes – (24.12%); NY-27 ▌Abraham Lawrence – 1,219 votes – (5.55%); NY-28 ▌Samuel Hallet – 4,895 votes – (24.89%); NY-29 ▌George R. Clark – 3,156 votes – (20.66%); NY-30 ▌Gilbert M. Cooley – 2,758 votes – (12.73%); NY-31 ▌Washington Hunt – 4,694 votes – (35.27%); NY-32 ▌Solomon G. Haven – 5,548 votes – (27.92%); NY-33 ▌Francis S. Edwards – 3,251 votes – (17.35%); NC-1 ▌William N. Smith – 5,255 votes – (49.82%); NC-3 ▌O.P. Meares – 1,488 votes – (19.02%); NC-5 ▌John A. Gilmer – 5,692 votes – (54.02%); NC-6 ▌Richard C. Puryear – 6,950 votes – (47.51%); NC-8 ▌Zebulon Vance – 3,211 votes – (26.04%); OH-1 ▌James F. Torrence – 2,642 votes – (20.27%); OH-2 ▌John S. Harrison – 3,229 votes – (24.26%); OH-4 ▌Philip Beeman – 369 votes – (1.95%); OH-5 ▌Columbus Paige – 474 votes – (2.41%); OH-6 ▌John A. Trimble – 1,598 votes – (9.05%); OH-7 ▌Willard Ellsberry – 1,011 votes – (6.69%); OH-8 ▌John W. Glover – 1,239 votes – (7.20%); OH-9 ▌William T. Wilson – 271 votes – (1.41%); OH-10 ▌Oscar F. Moore – 4,326 votes – (24.92%); OH-12 ▌James R. Stanberry – 851 votes – (4.63%); OH-16 ▌John Haynes – 1,382 votes – (9.16%); OH-17 ▌Joseph Davenport – 2,013 votes – (11.91%); PA-4 ▌Robert Foust – 6,560 votes – (35.85%); PA-21 ▌William M. Wright – 477 votes – (3.38%); PA-22 ▌Alexander Wadlow – 287 votes – (2.40%); TN-1 ▌Nathaniel G. Taylor – 7,471 votes – (49.42%); TN-2 ▌Horace Maynard – 5,556 votes – (50.89%); TN-3 ▌William Heiskill – 6,800 votes – (47.02%); TN-4 ▌Joseph Pickett – 5,232 votes – (44.84%); TN-5 ▌Charles Ready – 6,151 votes – (51.25%); TN-7 ▌D.E. McElrath – 1,665 votes – (16.19%); TN-8 ▌Felix Zollicoffer – 6,088 votes – (52.17%); TN-9 ▌Emerson Etheridge – 8,466 votes – (49.63%); TN-10 ▌William H. Stevens – 5,697 votes – (48.68%); TX-1 ▌Lemuel D. Evans – 9,929 votes – (39.29%); TX-2 ▌William E. Howth – 4,505 votes – (18.15%); VA-1 ▌J.J. Critcher – 2,825 votes – (?%); VA-3 ▌A. Judson Crane – 2,931 votes – (36.28%); VA-4 ▌FNU Collier – 1,132 votes – (23.87%); VA-7 ▌Edgar Snowden – 3,941 votes – (42.50%); VA-8 ▌William Lucas – 4,516 votes – (40.51%); VA-10 ▌FNU Dunnington – 2,821 votes – (28.51%); VA-11 ▌John S. Carlile – 6,653 votes – (46.17%); VA-13 ▌Elbert S. Martin – 5,249 votes – (49.67%)				22.80 / 100	14 / 236	▼38	24 / 236	▼32	Democratic	
1856-1857	5 D, 3 R, 22 U (Note: Unionist slate in Pennsylvania, jointly nominated by Republicans and Americans)	253,400	6.59 / 100 (Note: Of 3,847,162 votes)	47.39 / 100 (Note: Of 534,768 votes)	22.80 / 100	10 / 236	▲6	24 / 236	▼32	Democratic	
1856-1857	Candidate Performance: NJ-1 ▌Isaiah D. Clawson – 9,678 votes – (56.83%); NJ-2 ▌George R. Robbins – 11,723 votes – (52.30%); NJ-3 ▌James Bishop – 9,768 votes – (47.54%); NY-17 ▌Edwin Dodge – 6,115 votes – (29.35%); NY-19 ▌Jared C. Gregory – 8,881 votes – (45.30%); NY-20 ▌William C. Johnson – 8,275 votes – (43.80%); NY-21 ▌Frederick Hyde – 8,192 votes – (38.01%); NY-23 ▌Luther J. Dorwin – 6,070 votes – (35.17%); PA-1 ▌Edward B. Knight – 7,275 votes – (43.38%); PA-2 ▌Edward Joy Morris – 6,411 votes – (51.58%); PA-3 ▌William Millward – 6,753 votes – (45.98%); PA-5 ▌Daniel Mulvany – 7,961 votes – (45.14%); PA-6 ▌John S. Bowen – 7,851 votes – (47.85%); PA-7 ▌Samuel C. Bradshaw – 8,789 votes – (45.99%); PA-8 ▌David Yoder – 3,947 votes – (28.40%); PA-9 ▌Anthony E. Roberts – 10,001 votes – (54.59%); PA-10 ▌John C. Kunkel – 9,227 votes – (55.63%); PA-11 ▌James H. Campbell – 6,418 votes – (41.74%); PA-12 ▌Elhanan Smith – 7,657 votes – (42.31%); PA-13 ▌Samuel E. Dimmick – 5,065 votes – (31.07%); PA-14 ▌Galusha A. Grow – 13,325 votes – (71.31%); PA-15 ▌William H. Irwin – 9,451 votes – (48.64%); PA-16 ▌Lemuel Todd – 9,630 votes – (46.25%); PA-17 ▌Joseph Pumroy – 9,715 votes – (48.72%); PA-18 ▌John R. Edie – 8,792 votes – (50.91%); PA-19 ▌John Covode – 10,409 votes – (54.40%); PA-20 ▌Jonathan Knight – 9,411 votes – (47.85%); PA-23 ▌William Stewart – 8,552 votes – (61.00%); PA-24 ▌James S. Myers – 9,114 votes – (48.25%); PA-25 ▌John Dick – 8,944 votes – (67.97%)				22.80 / 100	10 / 236	▲6	24 / 236	▼32	Democratic	
1858-1859	43 A	133,285	3.52 / 100 (Note: Of 3,787,726 votes)	21.48 / 100 (Note: Of 620,604 votes)	10.47 / 100 (Note: Of 3,787,726 votes)	8 / 238	▼6	35 / 238	▲11	Republican	
1858-1859	Candidate Performance: AR-1 ▌W.M. Crosby – 2,853 votes – (13.52%); AR-2 ▌James A. Jones – 3,104 votes – (13.58%); LA-1 ▌John E. Bouligny – 2,215 votes – (49.55%); LA-2 ▌L.D. Nichols – 4,459 votes – (43.01%); LA-4 ▌M.A. Jones – 3,878 votes – (25.28%); MD-1 ▌Teagle Townsend – 6,384 votes – (47.93%); MD-2 ▌Edwin H. Webster – 9,237 votes – (52.02%); MD-3 ▌J. Morrison Harris – 9,612 votes – (69.47%); MD-4 ▌Henry W. Davis – 10,068 votes – (78.26%); MD-5 ▌Henry W. Hoffman – 8,716 votes – (49.62%); MD-6 ▌Alexander B. Hagner – 5,353 votes – (45.79%); MA-3 ▌Moses G. Cobb – 1,462 votes – (12.32%); MA-4 ▌Newell A. Thompson – 1,396 votes – (14.83%); MA-6 ▌George B. Loring – 2,116 votes – (19.74%); MA-7 ▌Elihu C. Baker – 810 votes – (6.86%); MA-8 ▌Josiah H. Temple – 576 votes – (5.47%); MA-10 ▌Mark Trafton – 508 votes – (4.78%); MO-1 ▌Samuel M. Breckinridge – 5,668 votes – (29.28%); MO-4 ▌James H. Adams – 7,284 votes – (36.93%); MO-5 ▌Samuel H. Woodson – 7,942 votes – (46.92%); NJ-1 ▌John T. Jones – 3,739 votes – (21.40%); NY-3 ▌Amor J. Williamson – 3,015 votes – (33.26%); NY-4 ▌Samuel F. Husted – 306 votes – (3.08%); NY-5 ▌Gilbert C. Dean – 821 votes – (7.09%); NY-7 ▌George Briggs – 8,306 votes – (55.76%); NY-9 ▌Edward W. Andrews – 545 votes – (3.45%); NY-10 ▌J.D. Friend – 1,587 votes – (11.50%); NY-14 ▌John D. Livingston – 260 votes – (1.43%); NY-16 ▌Charles M. Watson – 1,589 votes – (10.79%); NY-21 ▌Moses La Grange – 294 votes – (1.52%); NY-22 ▌Albertus Perry – 1,065 votes – (5.34%); NY-24 ▌B. Davis Noxon – 648 votes – (4.21%); NY-25 ▌William H. Sisson – 1,631 votes – (9.12%); NY-27 ▌William T. Lawrence – 670 votes – (3.25%); NY-28 ▌Goldsmith Dennison – 1,651 votes – (9.38%); NY-29 ▌James L. Angle – 1,393 votes – (10.11%); NY-30 ▌James W. Black – 2,264 votes – (12.91%); NY-31 ▌John H. White – 2,132 votes – (18.38%); NY-33 ▌William S. Johnson – 1,886 votes – (11.28%); NC-1 ▌? – ? votes – (?%); OH-6 ▌William R. Arthur – 394 votes – (2.61%); RI-E ▌Christopher Robinson – 3,846 votes – (49.29%)				10.47 / 100	8 / 238	▼6	35 / 238	▲11	Republican	
1858-1859	7 R, 2 D, 24 P (Note: People's slate in Pennsylvania, jointly nominated by Republicans and Americans)	263,334	6.84 / 100 (Note: Of 3,847,162 votes)	52.90 / 100 (Note: Of 497,812 votes)	10.47 / 100	27 / 238	▲17	35 / 238	▲11	Republican	
1858-1859	Candidate Performance: NY-1 ▌Luther C. Carter – 8,122 votes – (52.50%); NY-2 ▌James Humphrey – 6,475 votes – (36.88%); NY-6 ▌Robert H. McCurdy – 5,520 votes – (42.94%); NY-8 ▌Horace F. Clark – 9,035 votes – (58.77%); NY-12 ▌Charles L. Beale – 10,750 votes – (56.18%); NY-18 ▌Clark B. Cochrane – 10,581 votes – (53.17%); NY-26 ▌Emory B. Pottle – 8,598 votes – (54.52%); NY-32 ▌Elbridge G. Spaulding – 12,427 votes – (62.24%); NC-3 ▌Malcolm J. McDuffie – 1,284 votes – (21.20%); PA-1 ▌John W. Ryan – 6,492 votes – (41.00%); PA-2 ▌Edward J. Morris – 5,653 votes – (58.38%); PA-3 ▌John P. Verree – 6,977 votes – (54.24%); PA-4 ▌William Millward – 9,749 votes – (59.25%); PA-5 ▌John Wood – 9,701 votes – (57.37%); PA-6 ▌John M. Broomall – 4,676 votes – (28.09%); PA-7 ▌Henry C. Longnecker – 8,325 votes – (50.76%); PA-9 ▌Thaddeus Stevens – 9,513 votes – (60.00%); PA-10 ▌John W. Killinger – 8,900 votes – (61.46%); PA-11 ▌James H. Campbell – 7,153 votes – (47.20%); PA-12 ▌George W. Scranton – 10,043 votes – (61.89%); PA-13 ▌David K. Shoemaker – 6,566 votes – (45.05%); PA-14 ▌Galusha A. Grow – 11,165 votes – (76.87%); PA-15 ▌James T. Hale – 9,238 votes – (55.69%); PA-16 ▌Benjamin F. Junkin – 8,646 votes – (50.13%); PA-17 ▌Edward McPherson – 9,348 votes – (50.72%); PA-18 ▌Samuel S. Blair – 9,114 votes – (57.71%); PA-19 ▌John Covode – 9,149 votes – (52.81%); PA-20 ▌Jonathan Knight – 5,794 votes – (38.50%); PA-21 ▌James K. Moorhead – 6,539 votes – (57.27%); PA-22 ▌Robert McKnight – 5,438 votes – (55.25%); PA-23 ▌William Stewart – 6,721 votes – (64.02%); PA-24 ▌Chapin Hall – 9,012 votes – (52.42%); PA-25 ▌Elijah Babbitt – 6,360 votes – (60.37%)				10.47 / 100	27 / 238	▲17	35 / 238	▲11	Republican	

U.S. Senate
Election	Seats		Control
1844-1845	0 / 54	Steady	Democratic
1846-1847	0 / 58	Steady	Democratic
1848–1849	0 / 60	Steady	Democratic
1850–1851	0 / 62	Steady	Democratic
1852–1853	1 / 62	▲1	Democratic
1854–1855	1 / 62	Steady	Democratic
1856–1857	4 / 62	▲3	Democratic
1858–1859	2 / 66	▼2	Democratic

=== State elections ===
U.S. Governorships
Election	Nominees (and Endorsees)	Votes				Control				Performance Map
Election	Nominees (and Endorsees)	No.	Share	Share (Where Contesting)	Share (Total)	No.	±	No. (Party and Endorsed)	±	Performance Map
1844	No Candidates					0 / 26	Steady	0 / 26	Steady	
1845	1 A	8,089	1.17 / 100 (Note: Of 688,953 votes)	7.64 / 100 (Note: Of 105,924 votes)	1.17 / 100 (Note: Of 688,953 votes)	0 / 28	Steady	0 / 28	Steady	
1845	Candidate Performance: MA ▌Henry Shaw – 8,089 votes – (7.64%)				1.17 / 100	0 / 28	Steady	0 / 28	Steady	
1846	3 A	10,326	0.76 / 100 (Note: Of 1,361,268 votes)	1.95 / 100 (Note: Of 530,614 votes)	0.76 / 100 (Note: Of 1,361,268 votes)	0 / 29	Steady	0 / 29	Steady	
1846	Candidate Performance: LA ▌Charles Derbigny – 598 votes – (2.56%); MA ▌Francis Baylies – 3,423 votes – (3.36%); NY ▌Ogden Edwards – 6,305 votes – (1.56%)				0.76 / 100	0 / 29	Steady	0 / 29	Steady	
1847	3 A	14,221	1.25 / 100 (Note: Of 1,135,112 votes)	3.23 / 100 (Note: Of 440,887 votes)	1.25 / 100 (Note: Of 1,135,112 votes)	0 / 29	Steady	0 / 29	Steady	
1847	Candidate Performance: MA ▌Francis Baylies – 2,876 votes – (2.73%); PA ▌Eman C. Reigart – 11,247 votes – (3.91%); VT ▌Reuben C. Benton – 98 votes – (0.20%)				1.25 / 100	0 / 29	Steady	0 / 29	Steady	
1848	No Candidates					0 / 30	Steady	0 / 30	Steady	
1849	No Candidates					0 / 30	Steady	0 / 30	Steady	
1850	No Candidates					0 / 31	Steady	0 / 31	Steady	
1851	1 A	1,850	0.11 / 100 (Note: Of 1,685,431 votes)	0.50 / 100 (Note: Of 366,373 votes)	0.11 / 100 (Note: Of 1,685,431 votes)	0 / 31	Steady	0 / 31	Steady	
1851	Candidate Performance: PA ▌Kimber Cleaver – 1,850 votes – (0.50%)				0.11 / 100	0 / 31	Steady	0 / 31	Steady	
1852	No Candidates					0 / 31	Steady	0 / 31	Steady	
1853	No Candidates					0 / 31	Steady	0 / 31	Steady	
1854	4 A	255,291	17.27 / 100 (Note: Of 1,478,385 votes)	36.27 / 100 (Note: Of 703,787 votes)	17.27 / 100 (Note: Of 1,478,385 votes)	3 / 31	▲3	3 / 31	▲3	
1854	Candidate Performance: DE ▌Peter F. Causey – 6,941 votes – (52.64%); ME ▌Anson Morrill – 44,565 votes – (49.17%); MA ▌Henry Gardner – 81,503 votes – (62.58%); NY ▌Daniel Ullman – 122,282 votes – (26.03%)				17.27 / 100	3 / 31	▲3	3 / 31	▲3	
1855	13 A	476,180	28.69 / 100 (Note: Of 1,659,633 votes)	35.81 / 100 (Note: Of 1,329,883 votes)	28.69 / 100 (Note: Of 1,659,633 votes)	6 / 31	▲3	6 / 31	▲3	
1855	Candidate Performance: AL ▌George D. Shortridge – 32,086 votes – (42.21%); CA ▌J. Neely Johnson – 51,157 votes – (52.52%); CT ▌William T. Minor – 28,080 votes – (43.51%); GA ▌Garnett Andrews – 43,358 votes – (41.76%); KY ▌Charles S. Morehead – 69,816 votes – (51.63%); LA ▌Charles Derbigny – 19,755 votes – (45.57%); MA ▌Henry Gardner – 51,497 votes – (37.73%); MS ▌Charles D. Fontaine – 27,579 votes – (45.78%); NH ▌Ralph Metcalf – 32,779 votes – (50.71%); OH ▌Allen Trimble – 24,276 votes – (8.04%); TX ▌David C. Dickson – 18,968 votes – (40.93%); VT ▌James M. Slade – 3,475 votes – (8.06%); VA ▌Thomas Flournoy – 73,354 votes – (46.63%)				28.69 / 100	6 / 31	▲3	6 / 31	▲3	
1856	9 A	406,846	20.03 / 100 (Note: Of 2,031,310 votes)	29.19 / 100 (Note: Of 1,393,944 votes)	22.53 / 100 (Note: Of 2,031,310 votes)	6 / 31	Steady	7 / 31	▲1	
1856	Candidate Performance: AR ▌James Yell – 14,841 votes – (35.58%); CT ▌William T. Minor – 26,008 votes – (38.99%); FL ▌David S. Walker – 5,894 votes – (48.68%); IL ▌Buckner S. Morris – 19,088 votes – (8.04%); MA ▌Henry Gardner – 92,467 votes – (58.92%); MO ▌Robert C. Ewing – 40,589 votes – (35.23%); NH ▌Ralph Metcalf – 32,119 votes – (48.15%); NY ▌Erastus Brooks – 130,870 votes – (22.04%); NC ▌John A. Gilmer – 44,970 votes – (43.80%)				22.53 / 100	6 / 31	Steady	7 / 31	▲1	
1856	1 O (Note: Joint nomination between Americans, Republicans, Whigs and Free-Soilers; New Jersey)	50,803	2.50 / 100 (Note: Of 2,031,310 votes)	51.29 / 100 (Note: Of 99,049 votes)	22.53 / 100	1 / 31	▲1	7 / 31	▲1	
1856	Candidate Performance: NJ ▌William A. Newell – 50,803 votes – (51.29%)				22.53 / 100	1 / 31	▲1	7 / 31	▲1	
1857	10 A	312,094	15.94 / 100 (Note: Of 1,958,404 votes)	21.51 / 100 (Note: Of 1,451,072 votes)	15.94 / 100 (Note: Of 1,958,404 votes)	3 / 31	▼3	4 / 31	▼3	
1857	Candidate Performance: CA ▌George W. Bowie – 19,481 votes – (20.80%); GA ▌Benjamin H. Hill – 46,796 votes – (44.81%); IA ▌W. T. Henry – 1,004 votes – (1.33%); MD ▌Thomas H. Hicks – 47,141 votes – (54.93%); MA ▌Henry Gardner – 37,596 votes – (28.81%); MS ▌Edward M. Yerger – 14,095 votes – (33.99%); MO ▌James S. Rollins – 47,641 votes – (49.82%); OH ▌Philadelph Van Trump – 10,272 votes – (3.11%); PA ▌Isaac Hazlehurst – 28,168 votes – (7.76%); TN ▌Robert H. Hatton – 59,807 votes – (45.66%)				15.94 / 100	3 / 31	▼3	4 / 31	▼3	
1857	No Cross-endorsed Candidates				15.94 / 100	1 / 31	Steady	4 / 31	▼3	
1858	2 A	72,964	6.02 / 100 (Note: Of 1,212,345 votes)	10.99 / 100 (Note: Of 663,898 votes)	6.02 / 100 (Note: Of 1,212,345 votes)	2 / 32	▼1	3 / 32	▼1	
1858	Candidate Performance: MA ▌Amos A. Lawrence – 12,084 votes – (10.13%); NY ▌Lorenzo Burrows – 60,880 votes – (11.17%)				6.02 / 100	2 / 32	▼1	3 / 32	▼1	
1858	1 P (Note: Joint nomination between Americans and Republicans; Delaware)	7,554	0.62 / 100 (Note: Of 1,212,345 votes)	49.33 / 100 (Note: Of 15,312 votes)	6.02 / 100	1 / 32	Steady	3 / 32	▼1	
1858	Candidate Performance: DE ▌James S. Buckmaster – 7,554 votes – (49.33%)				6.02 / 100	1 / 32	Steady	3 / 32	▼1	
1859	2 A	25,170	1.25 / 100 (Note: Of 2,006,113 votes)	18.56 / 100 (Note: Of 135,606 votes)	3.91 / 100 (Note: Of 2,006,113 votes)	1 / 32	▼1	2 / 32	▼1	
1859	Candidate Performance: LA ▌Thomas J. Wells – 10,805 votes – (39.85%); MA ▌George N. Briggs – 14,365 votes – (13.20%)				3.91 / 100	1 / 32	▼1	2 / 32	▼1	
1859	1 O (Note: Joint nomination between Americans, Republicans, and Anti-Lecompton Democrats; New Jersey)	53,315	2.66 / 100 (Note: Of 2,006,113 votes)	50.67 / 100 (Note: Of 105,209 votes)	3.91 / 100	1 / 32	Steady	2 / 32	▼1	
1859	Candidate Performance: NJ ▌Charles S. Olden – 53,315 votes – (50.67%)				3.91 / 100	1 / 32	Steady	2 / 32	▼1	

=== Municipal elections ===
U.S. Mayoralties
Year	Municipality	Nominee	# votes	% votes	Place	Municipality	Nominee	# votes	% votes	Place
1844	Boston, MA (Note: 7th Round Results from February 21st, 1845)	Thomas A. Davis	4,865	50.93 / 100	Elected	New York, NY	James Harper	24,534	48.69 / 100	Elected
1844	Brooklyn, NY	William Rockwell	1,723	27.58 / 100	3rd	Philadelphia, PA	Elhanan W. Keyser	5,065	34.67 / 100	2nd
1845	Boston, MA	William S. Damrell	1,647	19.54 / 100	2nd	New York, NY	James Harper	17,485	35.72 / 100	2nd
1845	Brooklyn, NY	William Rockwell	1,530	22.75 / 100	3rd	Philadelphia, PA	Elhanan W. Keyser	4,538	33.51 / 100	2nd
1846	Boston, MA	Ninian C. Betton	735	12.35 / 100	3rd	New York, NY	William B. Cozzens	8,372	17.95 / 100	3rd
1846	Brooklyn, NY	Thomas C. Pinckney	284	4.10 / 100	3rd	Philadelphia, PA	Peter A. Brown	3,244	26.48 / 100	3rd
1847	Boston, MA	Ninian C. Betton	866	9.73 / 100	4th	New York, NY	Elias G. Drake	2,078	4.78 / 100	3rd
1847	Philadelphia, PA	Peter Fritz	2,530	20.83 / 100	3rd					
1848	Boston, MA	Jerome V. C. Smith	417	5.35 / 100	4th					
1849										
1850										
1851	Boston, MA (Note: 3rd Round Results from December 24, 1851)	Jerome V. C. Smith	2,736	34.32 / 100	2nd					
1852	Philadelphia, PA	John S. Warner	408	3.02 / 100	3rd					
1854	Baltimore, MD	Samuel Hinks	13,845	55.49 / 100	Elected	Brooklyn, NY	George Hall (Note: Originally nominated by the Temperance Party; later cross-endorsed by the Whig and American Parties.)	9,001	58.12 / 100	Elected
1854	Boston, MA	Jerome V. C. Smith	6,429	55.50 / 100	Re-elected	New York, NY	James W. Barker	18,547	31.10 / 100	2nd
1855	Boston, MA	Nathaniel B. Shurtleff	5,390	41.95 / 100	2nd					
1856	Baltimore, MD	Thomas Swann	13,892	52.96 / 100	Elected	New Orleans, LA	Charles M. Waterman	4,726	63.11 / 100	Elected
1856	Boston, MA	Jonathan Preston	2,025	18.80 / 100	2nd	New York, NY	Isaac O. Barker	25,182	32.39 / 100	2nd
1856	Brooklyn, NY	George Hall	10,692	37.88 / 100	2nd	Philadelphia, PA	Henry D. Moore	25,445	46.05 / 100	2nd
1857	New York, NY	Daniel F. Tiemann (Note: Jointly nominated by Republicans and Americans)	43,216	51.38 / 100	Elected					
1858	Baltimore, MD	Thomas Swann	24,008	83.17 / 100	Re-elected	New Orleans, LA	Gerald Stith	3,581	50.93 / 100	Elected
1858	Boston, MA	Jerome V. C. Smith (Note: Declined nomination.)	183	1.53 / 100	4th					
1860	Baltimore, MD	Samuel Hindes	9,675	35.24 / 100	2nd	New Orleans, LA	John T. Monroe	3,727	49.06 / 100	Elected

== Legacy ==
The nativist, anti-Catholic spirit of the Know Nothing movement was revived by later political movements such as the American Protective Association of the 1890s and the Second Ku Klux Klan of the 1920s. In the late 19th century, Democrats called the Republicans "Know Nothings" in order to secure the votes of Germans in the Bennett Law campaign in Wisconsin in 1890. A similar culture war took place in Illinois in 1892, where Democrat John Peter Altgeld denounced the Republicans:

The spirit which enacted the Alien and Sedition laws, the spirit which actuated the "Know-nothing" party, the spirit which is forever carping about the foreign-born citizen and trying to abridge his privileges, is too deeply seated in the party. The aristocratic and know-nothing principle has been circulating in its system so long that it will require more than one somersault to shake the poison out of its bones.

Some historians and journalists "have found parallels with the Birther and Tea Party movements, seeing the prejudices against Latino immigrants and hostility towards Islam as a similarity". Historians Steve Fraser and Joshue B. Freeman lend their opinion on the Know Nothing and the Tea Party movements, arguing:

Tea Party populism should also be thought of as a kind of identity politics of the right. Almost entirely white, and disproportionately male and older, Tea Party advocates express a visceral anger at the cultural and, to some extent, political eclipse of an America in which people who looked and thought like them were dominant (an echo, in its own way, of the anguish of the Know-Nothings). A black President, a female speaker of the house, and a gay head of the House Financial Services Committee are evidently almost too much to bear. Though the anti-immigration and Tea Party movements so far have remained largely distinct (even with growing ties), they share an emotional grammar: the fear of displacement.

Know Nothing has become a provocative slur, suggesting that the opponent is both nativist and ignorant. George Wallace's 1968 presidential campaign was said by Time to be under the "neo-Know Nothing banner". Fareed Zakaria wrote that politicians who "encourage[d] Americans to fear foreigners" were becoming "modern incarnations of the Know-Nothings". In 2006, an editorial in The Weekly Standard by neoconservative William Kristol accused populist Republicans of "turning the GOP into an anti-immigration, Know-Nothing party". The lead editorial of the May 20, 2007, issue of The New York Times on a proposed immigration bill referred to "this generation's Know-Nothings". An editorial written by Timothy Egan in The New York Times on August 27, 2010, and titled "Building a Nation of Know-Nothings" discussed the birther movement, which falsely claimed that Barack Obama was not a natural-born U.S. citizen, which is a requirement for the office of president.

In the 2016 U.S. presidential election, a number of commentators and politicians compared candidate Donald Trump to the Know Nothings due to his anti-immigration policies.

== In popular culture ==
The fictional "Confederation of American Natives" party was represented in the 2002 film Gangs of New York, led by William "Bill the Butcher" Cutting (Daniel Day-Lewis), the fictionalized version of real-life Know Nothing leader William Poole. The Know Nothings also play a prominent role in the historical fiction novel Shaman by novelist Noah Gordon.

== Notable members ==
- Nathaniel P. Banks, Speaker of the U.S. House of Representatives from Massachusetts and Union Army general
- Levi Boone, mayor of Chicago
- John Wilkes Booth, actor at Ford's Theatre who assassinated President Abraham Lincoln
- John Edward Bouligny, congressman from Louisiana; refused to resign when Louisiana seceded from the Union
- John J. Crittenden, senator for Kentucky
- Henry Winter Davis, congressman from Maryland
- Andrew Jackson Donelson, Washington D.C. newspaper editor, diplomat to Texas and Prussia, and Andrew Jackson's nephew
- Millard Fillmore, 13th U.S. president
- James Greene Hardy, lieutenant governor of Kentucky
- Samuel Hinks, mayor of Baltimore
- Thomas Holliday Hicks, governor of Maryland
- William W. Hoppin, governor of Rhode Island
- Sam Houston, senator from Texas
- J. Neely Johnson, governor of California
- Anthony Kennedy, senator from Maryland
- Lewis Charles Levin, politician and social activist
- Charles S. Morehead, governor of Kentucky
- Samuel Morse, politician, painter and inventor of Morse code and the telegraph
- William Poole, politician and a founder and leader of the New York City criminal Nativist gang the Bowery Boys
- Thaddeus Stevens, congressman from Pennsylvania
- Thomas Swann, mayor of Baltimore
- Stephen Palfrey Webb, mayor of San Francisco
- Henry Wilson, 18th U.S. vice president

== See also ==
- Philadelphia Nativist Riots
- Know-Nothing Riots in United States politics (1844–1858)
- Baltimore Know-Nothing riots of 1856
- 71st Infantry Regiment (New York)
- Anti-Catholicism in the United States
- Nativism in United States politics
- Religious discrimination in the United States
- Xenophobia in the United States
