= 1845 Boston mayoral election =

- 1844–45 Boston mayoral election
- December 1845 Boston mayoral election
