= William S. Damrell =

American politician (1809–1860)

William Shapleigh Damrell
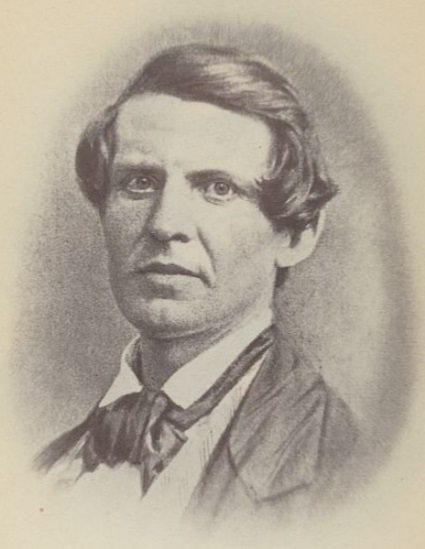

Member of the U.S. House of Representatives from Massachusetts's 3rd district
- In office March 4, 1855 – March 3, 1859
- Preceded by: J. Wiley Edmands
- Succeeded by: Charles Francis Adams Sr.

Personal details
- Born: November 29, 1809 Portsmouth, New Hampshire
- Died: May 17, 1860 (aged 50) Dedham, Massachusetts
- Party: Free Soil Party; American Party; Republican
- Spouse: Adeline A. Naef
- Children: 5
- Occupation: Printer and publisher

William Shapleigh Damrell (November 29, 1809 – May 17, 1860) was a member of the United States House of Representatives from Massachusetts.

== Career ==
Damrell was born in Portsmouth, New Hampshire on November 29, 1809. He attended public schools, learned the art of printing and became the proprietor of a large printing establishment in Boston. He published books, almanacs, and government publications of all types, but was primarily known for printing books, broadsides and pamphlets for temperance and other reform organizations. He also became the city's main supplier of stationery and office supplies.

In December 1845, Damrell was the unsuccessful Native American Party (Know Nothing) nominee for mayor of Boston.

Damrell was active in the Free Soil Party. In 1854 he was elected to the Thirty-fourth Congress as a Free Soiler with American Party (Know Nothing) support (March 4, 1855 – March 3, 1857). He was reelected as a Republican to the Thirty-fifth Congress (March 4, 1857 – March 3, 1859).

Damrell suffered a paralytic stroke before the expiration of his second term, and was not a candidate for renomination in 1858. He resumed his printing business activities.

== Death and burial ==
He died in Dedham on May 17, 1860. His interment was at Forest Hills Cemetery in the Jamaica Plain neighborhood of Boston, Massachusetts.

In 1892 his former estate was purchased and converted into the Fairview Cemetery.

== Family ==
Damrell was married to Adeline A. Naef (1807-1880). Their children included: Lucius Manlius Sargent Damrell (1833-1872); Catherine Shapley Damrell Gowland (1835-1860); William Shapleigh Damrell (1838-1873); Andrew Naef Damrell (1840-1909); and Horace Sargent Damrell (1842-1862).

U.S. House of Representatives
Preceded by J. Wiley Edmands	Member of the U.S. House of Representatives from Massachusetts's 3rd congressional district March 4, 1855 – March 3, 1859	Succeeded by Charles F. Adams, Sr.
