= Josiah Quincy Jr. =

American politician, mayor

Josiah Quincy IV
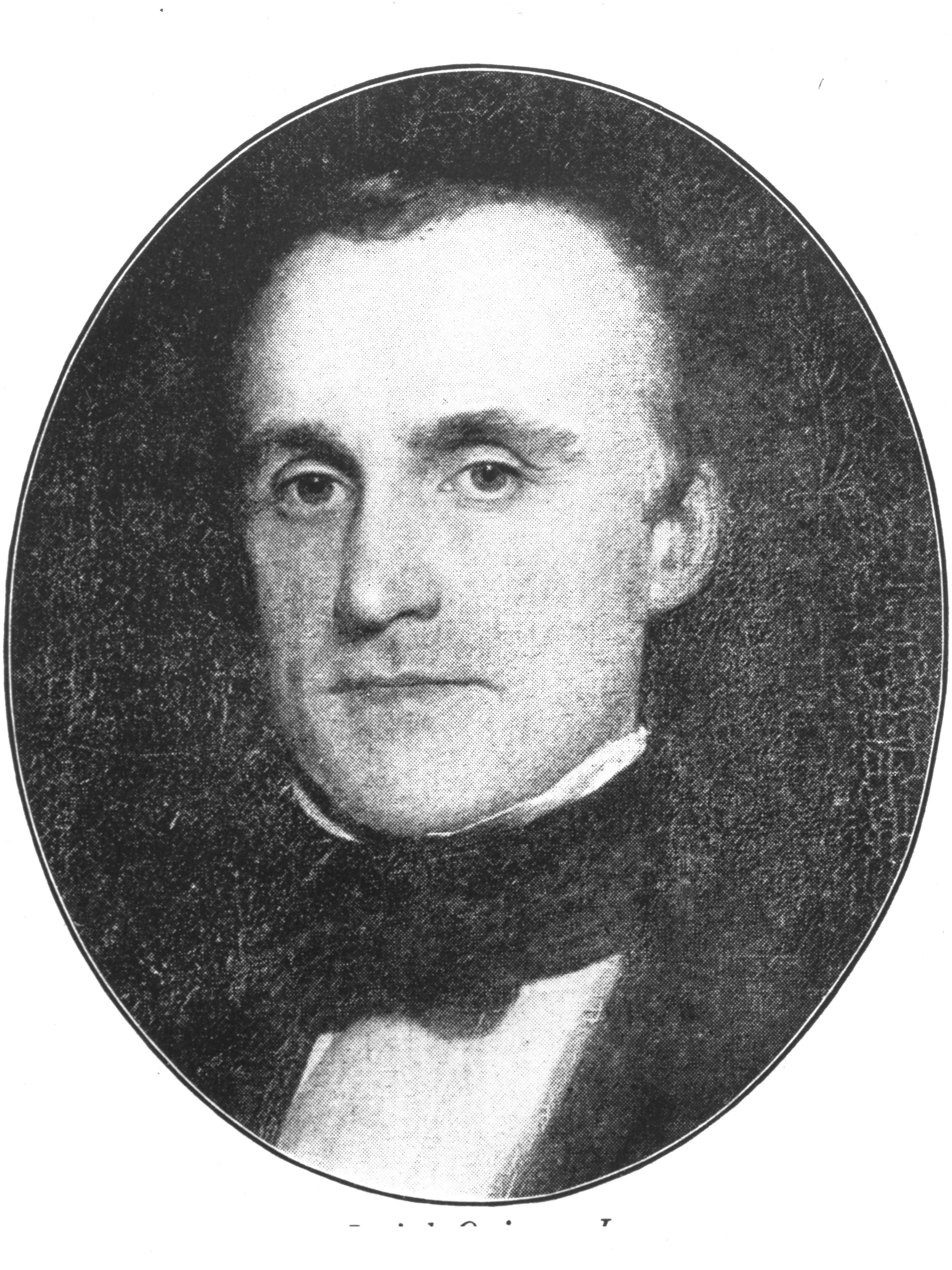

Mayor of Boston
- In office December 11, 1845 – January 1, 1849 (acting: December 11, 1845 – January 5, 1846)
- Preceded by: Thomas Aspinwall Davis; Benson Leavitt (acting)
- Succeeded by: John P. Bigelow

President of the Boston Common Council
- In office 1834–1857
- Preceded by: John P. Bigelow
- Succeeded by: Philip Marett

Personal details
- Born: January 17, 1802 Boston, Massachusetts
- Died: November 2, 1882 (aged 80) Boston, Massachusetts
- Party: Whig
- Spouse: Mary Jane Miller
- Relations: Quincy family
- Children: 3
- Occupation: Politician
- Mayor Davis died on November 22, 1845. Benson Leavitt, Chairman of the Board of Aldermen served as Acting Mayor from November 22, 1845 to December 11, 1845. After Quincy was elected Mayor on December 8, 1845 for the term beginning January 5, 1846, Quincy was appointed by the city council as acting mayor on December 11, 1845 to serve out Mayor Davis' term.

Josiah Quincy IV (/ˈkwɪnzi/; January 17, 1802 – November 2, 1882) was an American lawyer, historian, and politician. He served as mayor of Boston from December 11, 1845, to January 1, 1849, following in the footsteps of his father, Josiah Quincy III (mayor from 1823 to 1828). His grandson Josiah Quincy VI, was also a mayor of Boston from 1895 to 1899.

== Early life ==
Josiah Quincy IV was born on Pearl Street in the Downtown neighborhood of Boston, Massachusetts on January 17, 1802. He was the second child, and eldest son, of Josiah Quincy III and his wife Eliza Susan Morton. He was patrilineally a member of the Quincy family and his matrilineal uncle was Jacob Morton. His father was a member of the U.S. House of Representatives for Massachusetts, mayor of Boston, and President of Harvard University.

He attended Philips Academy in Andover and graduated from Harvard College in 1821.

== Career ==
He was elected a member of the Ancient and Honorable Artillery Company of Massachusetts in 1823 and became its captain in 1829 at the age of 27.

He was elected to the Boston Common Council in 1833 and served as its president from 1834 to 1837.

As a member of the Massachusetts State Legislature in 1837, he played a crucial role in establishing the Massachusetts Board of Education. He built the Josiah Quincy Mansion in 1848.

Quincy served as treasurer of the Boston Athenaeum from 1837 to 1852.

=== Quincy Homestead Association ===
In the 1850s, German speakers were the next large group of immigrants to arrive in Dedham after the Irish, also largely to work in the mills along Mother Brook. In 1865, 25% of immigrants in Dedham were German. The Germantown they established was north of the mills, on the East Dedham-West Roxbury border. There, the streets still have names including Bismark, Berlin, Schiller, and Goethe. In the neighborhood were German organizations such as the Germania Singing Society on Rockland Street.

This was a planned community, created by the German Quincy Homestead Association, a building and loan association promoted by Quincy and Edward Everett Hale. Quincy suggested a plan, and 27 Germans formed the association. They bought 60 acres from the Whiting family at $125 an acre and made Quincy the trustee. He laid out half acre lots and built 10 houses which were rented for $6 a week. The houses were designed by Quincy's brother, Edmund and the firm of firm of Ware and Van Brunt. (Note: Ware and Van Brunt also designed Memorial Hall in Dedham.)

Two acres were set aside as a park. The Town of Dedham purchased a lot for $750 on July 6, 1872 from the Association and built the Quincy School on it.

=== Mayor of Boston ===
After being elected mayor of Boston in the December 1845 Boston mayoral election, Quincy succeeded Benson Leavitt, who had become acting mayor after the death of Mayor Thomas Aspinwall Davis, in his position as acting mayor on December 11, 1845. He officially became mayor on January 1, 1845. He served until January 1, 1849.

He authored Figures of the Past in 1883.

Quincy died on November 2, 1882, aged 80, in Boston.

== Travels ==
In 1844, while traveling with Charles Francis Adams, Josiah Quincy met Joseph Smith, the founder of the Church of Jesus Christ of Latter-Day Saints, in Nauvoo, Illinois. During the visit, Adams received a copy of the Book of Mormon which had previously belonged to Smith's wife, Emma Smith. The book is now in the archive collections of Adams National Historical Park. At the visit, Smith showed Adams and Quincy four Egyptian mummies and ancient papyri. Adams was unimpressed by Smith, and wrote in his diary entry that day, "Such a man is a study not for himself, but as serving to show what turns the human mind will sometimes take. And herafter if I should live, I may compare the results of this delusion with the condition in which I saw it and its mountebank apostle."

== Family ==
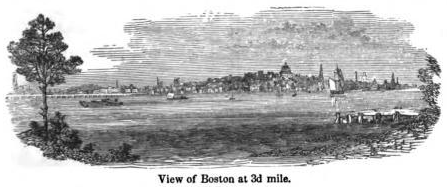
Boston Skyline Circa 1847

His brother Edmund (1808–1877) was a prominent abolitionist, and author of the biography of his father and of a romance, Wensley (1854). A sister, Anna Cabot Lowell Quincy Waterston, was a writer; and another sister, Eliza Susan (1798–1884) served as her father's secretary and wrote the biography of their mother.

Quincy had two sons — Josiah Phillips (1829–1910), a lawyer, who wrote, besides some verse, The Protection of Majorities (1876) and Double Taxation in Massachusetts (1889); and Samuel Miller (1833–1887), who practiced law, wrote on legal subjects, served in the Union army during the Civil War, and was breveted brigadier-general of volunteers in 1865.

A descendant of his, through her mother, was Helen Howe, a novelist.

== See also ==
- 63rd Massachusetts General Court (1842)
- Timeline of Boston, 1840s
- 1844–45 Boston mayoral election
- December 1845 Boston mayoral election
- 1846 Boston mayoral election
- 1847 Boston mayoral election

== Sources ==
- William Guild, Description of the Boston and Worcester and Western Railroads: In which is Noted the Towns, Villages, Station, Bridges, Viaducts, Tunnels, Cuttings, Embankments, Gradients, &c., the Scenery and Its Natural History, and Other Objects Passed by this Line of Railway. With Numerous Illustrations, Boston?: Bradbury & Guild, 1847, p. 13.

Political offices
Preceded by Thomas Aspinwall Davis; Benson Leavitt (acting)	Mayor of Boston, Massachusetts; 1846–1848	Succeeded by John P. Bigelow
