= Finis McLean =

American politician (1806–1881)

Finis Ewing McLean

Member of the U.S. House of Representatives from Kentucky's 3rd district
- In office March 4, 1849 – March 3, 1851
- Preceded by: Samuel Peyton
- Succeeded by: Presley Ewing

Member of the Kentucky House of Representatives
- In office 1837

Personal details
- Born: February 19, 1806 Russellville, Kentucky, U.S.
- Died: April 12, 1881 (aged 75) Greencastle, Indiana, U.S.
- Resting place: Forest Hill Cemetery; Greencastle, Indiana, U.S.
- Party: Whig
- Relations: John McLean (brother); James David Walker (nephew)

Finis Ewing McLean (February 19, 1806 – April 12, 1881) was a United States representative from Kentucky.

== Early life ==
Finis Ewing McLean was born on February 19, 1806, near Russellville, Kentucky. He attended the country schools and Lebanon Academy in Logan County, Kentucky. Later, he studied law, was admitted to the bar. He was the brother of John McLean and uncle of James David Walker.

== Career ==
McLean commenced practice in Elkton, Kentucky in 1827. He also engaged in agricultural pursuits.

== Political career ==
McLean was a member of the Kentucky House of Representatives in 1837 and was also elected as a Whig to the Thirty-first Congress (March 4, 1849 - March 3, 1851). After leaving Congress, he resumed the practice of law and also engaged in agricultural pursuits. He moved to Andrew County, Missouri in 1860 and engaged in farming until 1865. Later, he relocated to Greencastle, Indiana in 1865 in which city he died in 1881. He was buried in Forest Hill Cemetery in Greencastle.

U.S. House of Representatives
Preceded by Samuel Peyton	Member of the U.S. House of Representatives from Kentucky's 3rd congressional district March 4, 1849 – March 3, 1851	Succeeded by Presley Ewing
