= 1847 Boston mayoral election =

Election in Massachusetts, United States

- December 13, 1847
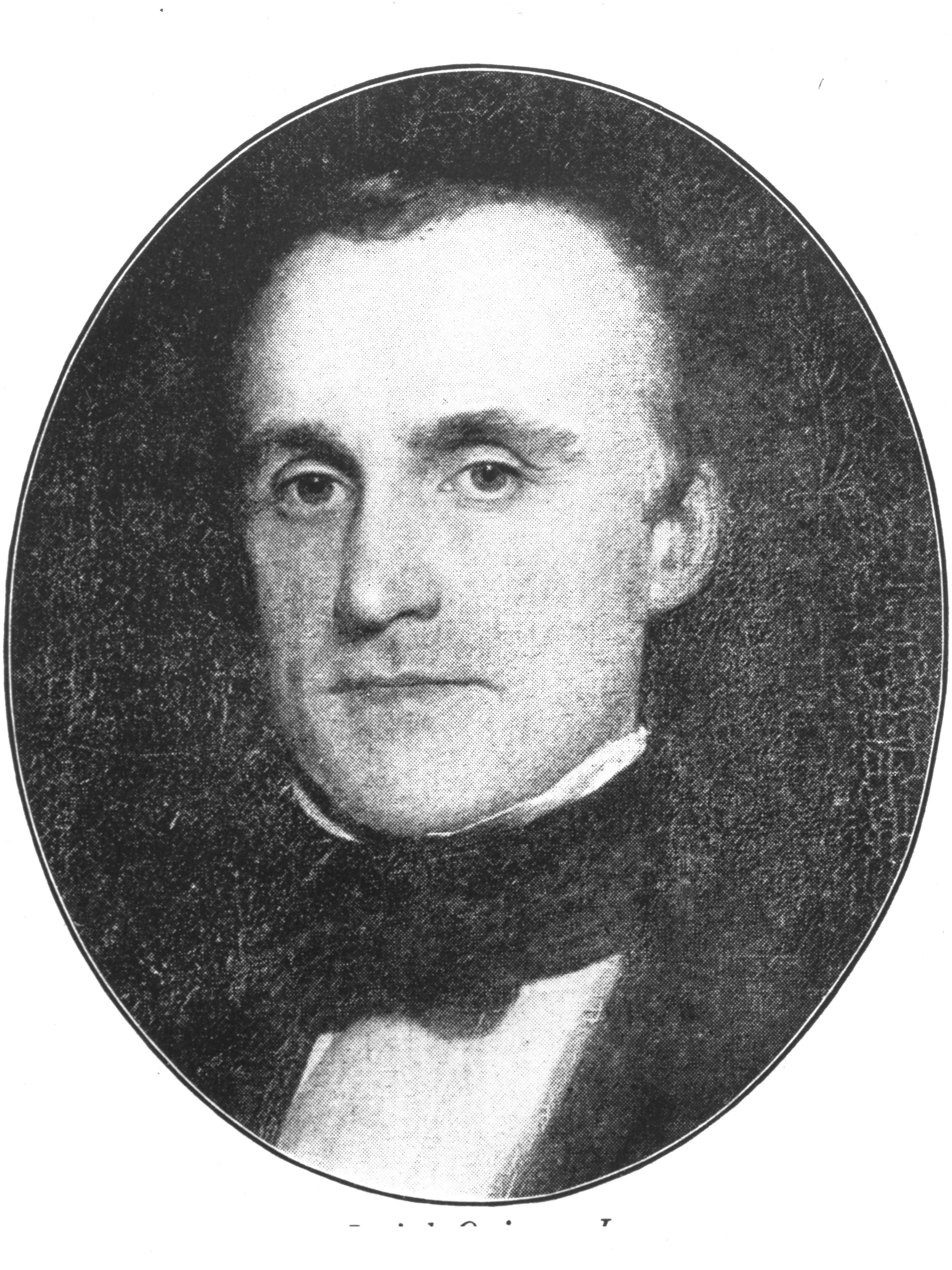

| Candidate | Josiah Quincy Jr. | Charles G. Goodrich |
| Party | Whig | Democratic |
| Popular vote | 4,756 | 1,657 |
| Percentage | 53.46% | 18.63% |
| Candidate | William Parker | Ninian C. Betton |
| Party | Independent Whig | Know Nothing |
| Popular vote | 1,547 | 866 |
| Percentage | 17.39% | 9.73% |
Mayor before election
Josiah Quincy Jr.
Whig
Elected mayor
Josiah Quincy Jr.
Whig

The 1847 Boston mayoral election saw the reelection of Whig Party incumbent Josiah Quincy Jr. to a third consecutive term. It was held on December 13, 1847.

== Candidates ==
- Ninian C. Betton ("Native American Party" –Know Nothing), candidate for mayor in 1846
- Charles G. Goodrich (Democratic Party), candidate for mayor in 1846
- William Parker (independent Whig), former acting mayor of Boston
- Josiah Quincy Jr. (Whig Party), incumbent mayor

== Results ==
1947 Boston mayoral election
| Party | Candidate | Votes | % |
|---|---|---|---|
| Whig | Josiah Quincy Jr. (incumbent) | 4,756 | 53.46 |
| Democratic | Charles G. Goodrich | 1,657 | 18.63 |
| Independent Whig | William Parker | 1,547 | 17.39 |
| Know Nothing | Ninian C. Betton | 866 | 9.73 |
| Scattering | Other | 70 | 0.79 |
| Total votes | | 8,896 | 100 |

== See also ==
- List of mayors of Boston, Massachusetts
