= Presley Ewing =

American politician

Member of the U.S. House of Representatives from Kentucky's 3rd district
- In office March 4, 1851 – September 27, 1854
- Preceded by: Finis McLean
- Succeeded by: Francis Bristow

Personal details
- Born: September 1, 1822 Russellville, Kentucky, US
- Died: September 27, 1854 (aged 32) Mammoth Cave, Kentucky, US
- Party: Whig Party
- Education: Transylvania University

Presley Underwood Ewing (September 1, 1822 – September 27, 1854) was a U.S. representative from Kentucky.

Born in Russellville, Kentucky, Ewing attended the public schools. He completed preparatory studies. He was graduated from Centre College, Danville, Kentucky, in 1840 and from the law school of Transylvania University, Lexington, Kentucky, in 1843. He studied theology at the Baptist Seminary at Newton, Massachusetts, in 1845 and 1846. He returned to Kentucky and practiced law in Russellville. He served as member of the Kentucky House of Representatives in 1848 and 1849.

Ewing was elected as a Whig to the Thirty-second and Thirty-third Congresses and served from March 4, 1851, until his death in the town of Mammoth Cave, Kentucky, September 27, 1854. He was interred in Maple Grove Cemetery, Russellville, Kentucky.

== See also ==
- List of members of the United States Congress who died in office (1790–1899)

U.S. House of Representatives
Preceded by Finis McLean	Member of the U.S. House of Representatives from Kentucky's 3rd congressional district March 4, 1851 – September 27, 1854	Succeeded by Francis Bristow
