= Warner Underwood =

American politician

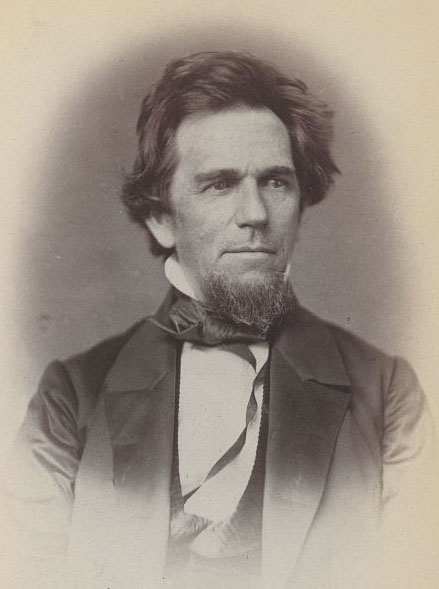

United States Consul to Glasgow, Scotland
- In office July 17, 1862 – September 30, 1864
- President: Abraham Lincoln

Member of the U.S. House of Representatives from Kentucky's 3rd district
- In office March 4, 1855 – March 3, 1859
- Preceded by: Francis Bristow
- Succeeded by: Francis Bristow

Member of the Kentucky Senate
- In office 1849-1853

Member of the Kentucky House of Representatives
- In office 1848

Personal details
- Born: Warner Lewis Underwood; August 7, 1808 Goochland County, Virginia, US
- Died: March 12, 1872 (aged 63) Warren County, Kentucky, US
- Resting place: Fairview Cemetery
- Party: American
- Other political affiliations: Whig
- Spouse: Lucy Craig Henry
- Relations: Brother of Joseph Rogers Underwood
- Children: Fanny Underwood Grider, Lucy W. Underwood McCann, Juliette Western Long, Josie Underwood Nazro, Henry Underwood, Warner Underwood, Mary Underwood Crump
- Education: University of Virginia at Charlottesville
- Profession: Lawyer

Warner Lewis Underwood (August 7, 1808 – March 12, 1872) was an attorney, state legislator and U.S. representative from Kentucky. Like his brother Joseph Rogers Underwood (who had represented the same Kentucky district a decade previously), he was a Unionist before the American Civil War, and during the war (in which his plantation was destroyed), he served as U.S. Consul in Glasgow, Scotland.

== Early and family life ==
Born in Goochland County, Virginia, on August 7, 1808, to John Underwood (1767–1837), a veteran of the American Revolutionary War, and his wife Frances Rogers (d.1809), he had several older brothers and sisters. His grandfather Thomas Underwood (1740–1815) had been a colonel in Goochland County during the American Revolutionary War, and also served on the Committee of Safety. His older brother Joseph Rogers Underwood had moved to Kentucky five years before he was born, and represented Kentucky's 3rd Congressional district a decade before Warner Underwood.

Warner Underwood moved to Bowling Green, Warren County, Kentucky in 1825, but returned to Charlottesville, Virginia to study law at the University of Virginia at Charlottesville, graduating in 1829.

He married Lucy Craig Henry (1816–1893), daughter of an engineer on the Green-Barren River improvement project in Bowling Green's Christ Episcopal Church in 1831. Although born in Kentucky, her lineage also included the First Families of Virginia, and her grandfather William Henry (1761–1824) had served as a private under Col. Harry Lee during the American Revolution. Eight of their children survived to adulthood, including Fanny R. Underwood Grider (1833–1901)(who married the son of U.S. Congressman Henry Grider), Lucy Underwood McCann (whose husband Ferdinand J. McCann moved to California and became a judge in Santa Cruz), Juliette Underwood Western Long (1835–1909) (who married a Confederate Kentucky Cavalry Colonel), Joanna Louisa Underwood Nazro (1840–1923)(whose husband was an officer of the 26th Illinois Infantry), Warner Underwood (1845–1874), Henry Lewis Underwood (1848–1925) and Mary Underwood Crump (1857–1920).

== Career ==
Underwood returned to Kentucky after getting his law degree, and established his legal practice in Bowling Green with his brother Joseph in 1830, after admission to the bar. Bowling Green was the county seat of Warren County, as well as the largest commercial center between Louisville, Kentucky and Nashville, Tennessee, from which farmers could ship goods via rail or riverboat.

In 1834, Warner Underwood moved to Texas and became U.S. attorney for the Eastern district of Texas, but returned to Bowling Green in 1840. Underwood had acted as a land agent for immigrants to the American colony on the Brazos River, but the Texas Revolution changed his mind about moving his family to the Southwest.

Underwood purchased Mount Air plantation, which overlooked the Barren River (a tributary of the Ohio River) and later the Louisville and Nashville Railroad (whose trains ran after 1859; two years later trains also ran to Memphis, Tennessee). In addition to his legal practice, Warner Underwood ran his plantation, using a white overseer to supervise his slaves tilling the land. By 1860, he was one of the county's wealthiest men, with real estate appraised at $60,000 and personal property (including 28 slaves of whom 10 were children less than 10 years old) valued at $45,000. An extended family lived at the plantation, including their daughter Fanny and her husband Benjamin Grider and children, and sometimes Mrs. Underwood's orphaned niece and nephew. However, their daughters Lucy and Juliette lived with their respective husbands and children outside Kentucky.

Underwood's views on slavery were complex, for he grew up alongside slave children and did not like the institution. However, he accepted the slaves he inherited upon his grandmother's death. Unlike his older brother Joseph, who also accepted inherited slaves but who was active in the Kentucky Colonization Society and eventually freed most conditioned upon their leaving for Liberia, Warner Underwood sent no slaves to Liberia.

== Political career ==
Voters elected Warner Underwood to the Kentucky state house of representatives in 1848 as a Whig, and to the state senate the following year, where he served a term (1849–1853).

The following year Underwood ran for a seat in the U.S. Congress formerly held by his elder brother Joseph as well as his son-in-law's father Harry Grider. Warner Underwood won as the candidate of the Know-Nothing Party (a/k/a American Party) to the Thirty-fourth, and was re-elected to the Thirty-fifth Congresses (March 4, 1855 – March 3, 1859). His most famous speech argued against admission of Kansas under the Lecompton Constitution. He did not run for re-election in 1858, and Francis Bristow, who had been a Whig and whom he had defeated in 1854, succeeded him.

During the heated presidential election of 1860, Warner Underwood campaigned for John Bell of Tennessee and Edward Everett of Massachusetts, the candidates of the Constitutional Union Party. That party carried Kentucky, which had few Republicans, but Abraham Lincoln won the presidency. Underwood toured the Bluegrass State and urged voters against joining the Confederacy.

When the American Civil War began, Kentucky tried to remain neutral, although both armies accepted Kentuckians at recruiting stations just outside the state's borders. Bowling Green was occupied by Confederate troops, and General Buckner initially assured Underwood that despite his support for the Union, his property would not be molested. However, evacuation of his plantation was ordered in January 1862, and it was destroyed (perhaps during the bombardment of February 14, 1862), as was the building that housed his law office. Union troops later killed or ran off much of the livestock, as well as seized 450 cords of wood and 36,000 bricks from what had been the mansion.

Nominated by President Lincoln to the important post of United States Consul to Glasgow, Scotland (an important center for cotton traders, who were courted by the Confederate States of America), he was confirmed by the U.S. Senate and served from July 17, 1862, until September 30, 1864. He brought some family members with him, including his wife Lucy, daughter Josie and son Henry. Part of his duties involved reporting on ships carrying rebel goods and vessels suspected of being built for the Confederate navy. Underwood did not like the skullduggery required, but his superiors refused to transfer him, so after a family trip to London, Naples and Rome, he submitted his resignation. In October the family sailed homeward.

== Postwar ==
As the American Civil War was ending, Underwood returned to the United States with his family, and visited his daughter Lucy and her husband Ferdinand J. McCann, who had avoided the conflict near San Francisco, California. The Underwoods then returned to Kentucky in 1866, where Warner sold some of his ruined plantation, rented a small house, and tried to resume his legal practice.

== Death and legacy ==
Warner Underwood suffered a stroke in 1868, from which he never fully recovered. He died near Bowling Green, Kentucky, on March 12, 1872.

Most of his papers, as well as manuscripts of the (recently published) Civil War diary of his daughter Josie (Johanna Louisa) and memoir of her sister Juliete Blanche Western Long (whose husband served in the Confederate army) are held by Western Kentucky University. Josie never was reconciled to the decline in her lifestyle, since her husband eventually moved to Ballston Spa, New York and held an office job paying only about $100/month, i.e. far less than her affluent upbringing. After his death (and that of their daughter Edith) in California, she returned to Bowling Green in 1912 and lived with one of her sons in a small house. She also prepared a brief history of the town, and eventually bequeathed her DAR pin and journal to a granddaughter in Texas.

U.S. House of Representatives
Preceded by Francis Bristow	Member of the U.S. House of Representatives from Kentucky's 3rd congressional district March 4, 1855 – March 3, 1859	Succeeded by Francis Bristow
