= 1846 New York gubernatorial election =

- November 3, 1846
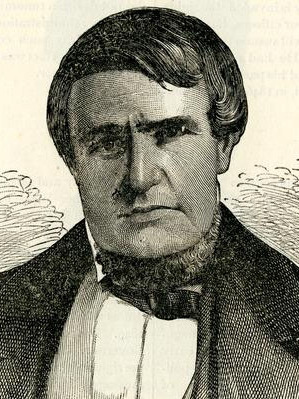

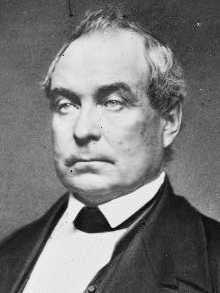
Nominee	John Young	Silas Wright
Party	Whig	Democratic
Alliance	Anti-Rent
Popular vote	198,878	187,306
Percentage	49.06%	46.21%
- Results by county Young: 50–60% 60–70% Tie: 50% Wright: 50–60% 60–70% 70–80%
Governor before election
Silas Wright
Democratic
Elected Governor
John Young
Whig

The 1846 New York gubernatorial election was held on November 3, 1846. Incumbent Governor Silas Wright ran for a second term in office but was defeated by John Young. Young won with the support of the Anti-Rent movement, an armed insurgency of tenant farmers who rebelled against the existing feudal system of landholding.

== Background ==
Like his predecessor, William C. Bouck, Governor Silas Wright was occupied for much of his term with the ongoing Anti-Rent War in the upstate region. Tenants who held perpetual leases under the patroon system, first implemented when New York was a Dutch colony, objected to the "quarter sale" provision of their leases, which required them to pay a "patroon" (or patron) one quarter of the sale price or one additional year's rent. Following the 1839 death of Stephen Van Rensselaer, who had generally been considered a benevolent landlord, his heirs attempted to collect long-overdue payments. When the tenants could not pay and could not negotiate for favorable repayment terms, they were threatened with eviction and a revolt ensued.

Bouck, who had been sympathetic to the tenants but had mobilized the state militia against them, had lost the Democratic nomination in 1844 over his handling of the revolt and was succeeded by Silas Wright, who had taken a stricter line against the renters. In response to unrest in Delaware County, Wright declared a state of insurrection and dispatched the militia to restore order.

== Whig nomination ==
=== Candidates ===
- John Young, former U.S. Representative and State Senator from Geneseo

==== Declined to be drafted ====
- Millard Fillmore, former U.S. Representative from Buffalo and nominee in 1844

=== Campaign ===
Following his defeat in 1844, Millard Fillmore became chancellor of the University of Buffalo and a vocal critic of James K. Polk. He opposed the annexation of Texas and Mexican–American War, which he saw as a contrivance to extend slavery. Fillmore was also angered when Polk vetoed a river and harbors bill that would have benefited Buffalo, writing, "May God save the country for it is evident the people will not." This made Fillmore an early favorite for the Whig nomination in 1846, but he deferred in favor of his supporter, John Young. Nevertheless, he came within one vote of the nomination.

=== Results ===
1846 New York gubernatorial election
Party	Candidate	Votes	%
Whig	John Young	76	62.81%
Whig	Millard Fillmore (draft)	45	37.19%
Total votes		121	100.00%

== General election ==
=== Candidates ===
- Henry Bradley (Liberty and National Reform)
- Ogden Edwards (Native American)
- Silas Wright, incumbent Governor since 1845 and United States Senator (Democratic)
- John Young, former U.S. Representative and State Senator from Geneseo (Whig)

=== Results ===
1846 New York gubernatorial election
Party	Candidate	Votes	%	±%
Whig	John Young	198,878	49.06%	▲2.06
Democratic	Silas Wright (incumbent)	187,306	46.21%	▼3.27
Liberty	Henry Bradley	12,844	3.17%	▲0.05
Native American	Ogden Edwards	6,305	1.56%	N/A
Total votes		405,333	100.00%	

== See also ==
- New York gubernatorial elections
- New York state elections
