= 1847 Philadelphia mayoral election =

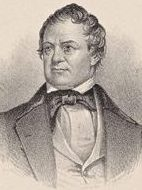

Nominee	John Swift	Altamont Phillips	Peter Fritz
General election vote	6,046	3,550	2,530
General election percentage	49.78%	29.23%	20.83%
City Council vote	29	0
City Council percentage	100%	0.00%
Mayor before election
John Swift
Whig
Elected mayor
John Swift
Whig

The 1847 Philadelphia mayoral election saw John Swift reelected to office for an eleventh overall non-consecutive term.

This was the last regularly scheduled mayoral election in which the City Council selected the mayor, as all subsequent mayoral elections either reached a majority in the general election or used a different electoral system.

== Electoral system ==
Beginning in 1839, the city operated under a mixed electoral system. Citizens voted for mayor in a general election. If a candidate receive a majority of the vote, they would be elected mayor. However, if no candidate received a majority, the City Council would select a mayor from the top-two finishers.

== Results ==
=== General election ===
1847 Philadelphia mayoral election results (general election)
Candidate	Votes	%
John Swift (incumbent)	6,046	49.78%
Altamont Phillips	3,550	29.23%
Peter Fritz	2,530	20.83%
James Hansell	10	0.08%
John M. Scott	2	0.02%
Others	8	0.06%
Total votes	12,146	

=== City Council (runoff) ===
1847 Philadelphia mayoral election results (City Council runoff)
Candidate	Votes	%
John Swift (incumbent)	29	100%
Altamont Phillips	0	0.00%
Total votes	29	
