= December 1845 Boston mayoral election =

Election in Massachusetts, United States

- December 8, 1845
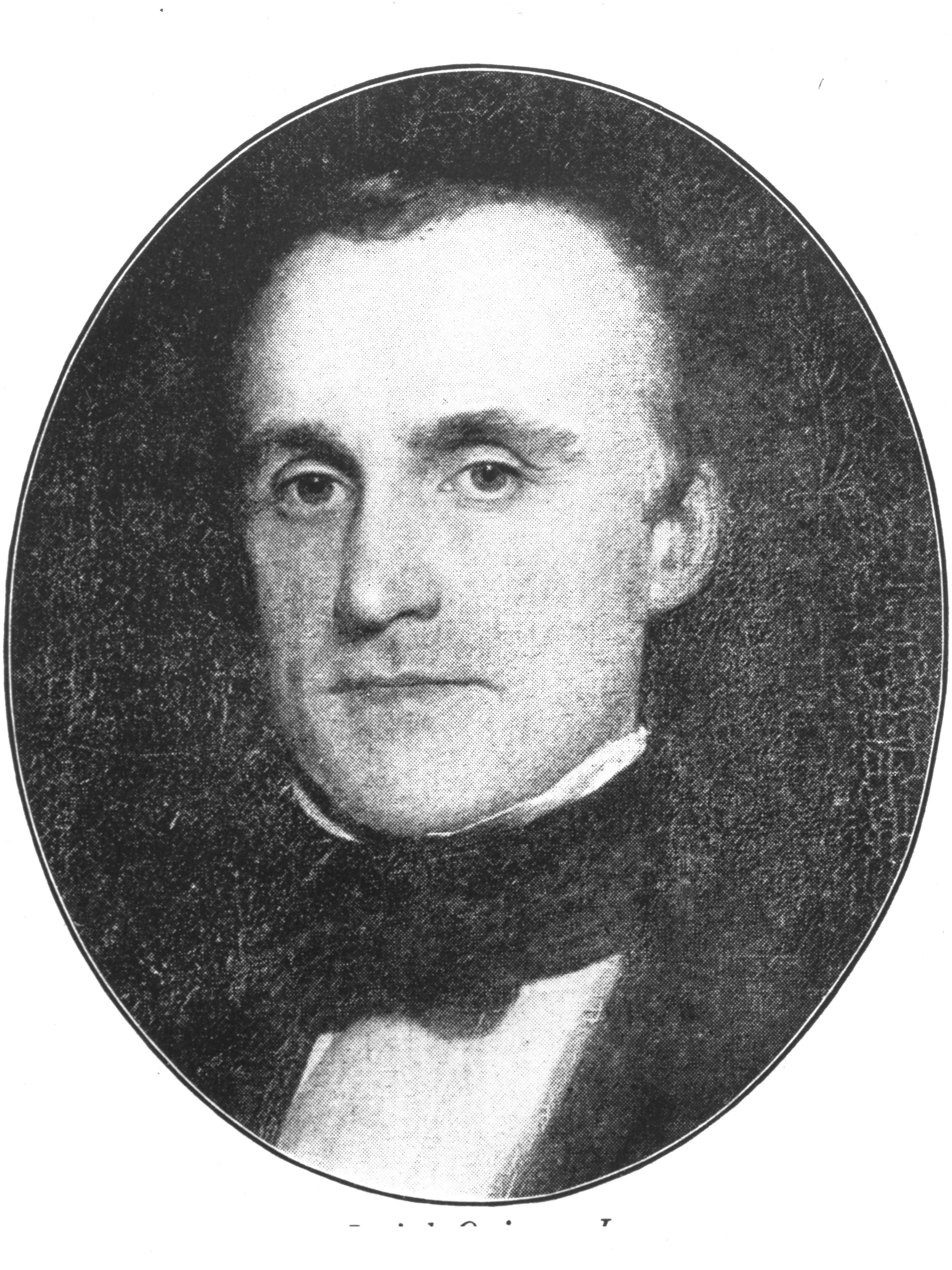

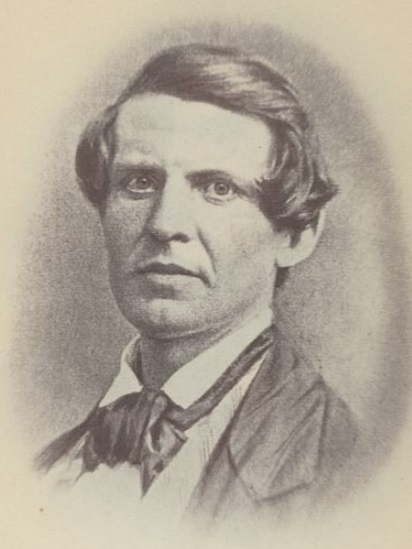

Candidate	Josiah Quincy Jr.	William S. Damrell	John T. Heard
Party	Whig	Know Nothing	Democratic
Popular vote	5,333	1,647	1,354
Percentage	63.25%	19.54%	16.06%
Mayor before election
Benson Leavitt (acting mayor)
Whig
Elected mayor
Josiah Quincy Jr.
Whig

The December 1845 Boston mayoral election saw the election of Whig Party nominee Josiah Quincy Jr. It was held on December 8, 1845.

== Candidates ==
- William S. Damrell ("Native American Party" –Know Nothing)
- John T. Heard (Democratic Party/Locofoco)
- Josiah Quincy Jr. (Whig Party)

== Results ==
1845 Boston mayoral election
Party	Candidate	Votes	%
Whig	Josiah Quincy Jr.	5,333	63.25
Know Nothing	William S. Damrell	1,647	19.54
Democratic	John T. Heard	1,354	16.06
Scattering	Other	97	1.15
Total votes		8,431	100

== Aftermath ==
Quincy's majority over Know-Nothing nominee Darrell led The Boston Post to run the headline "Nativeism deceased of the Quincy". The Whig Party overwhelmingly triumphed in the other coinciding municipal elections.

== See also ==
- List of mayors of Boston, Massachusetts
