= 1846 Boston mayoral election =

Election in Massachusetts, United States

- December 14, 1846
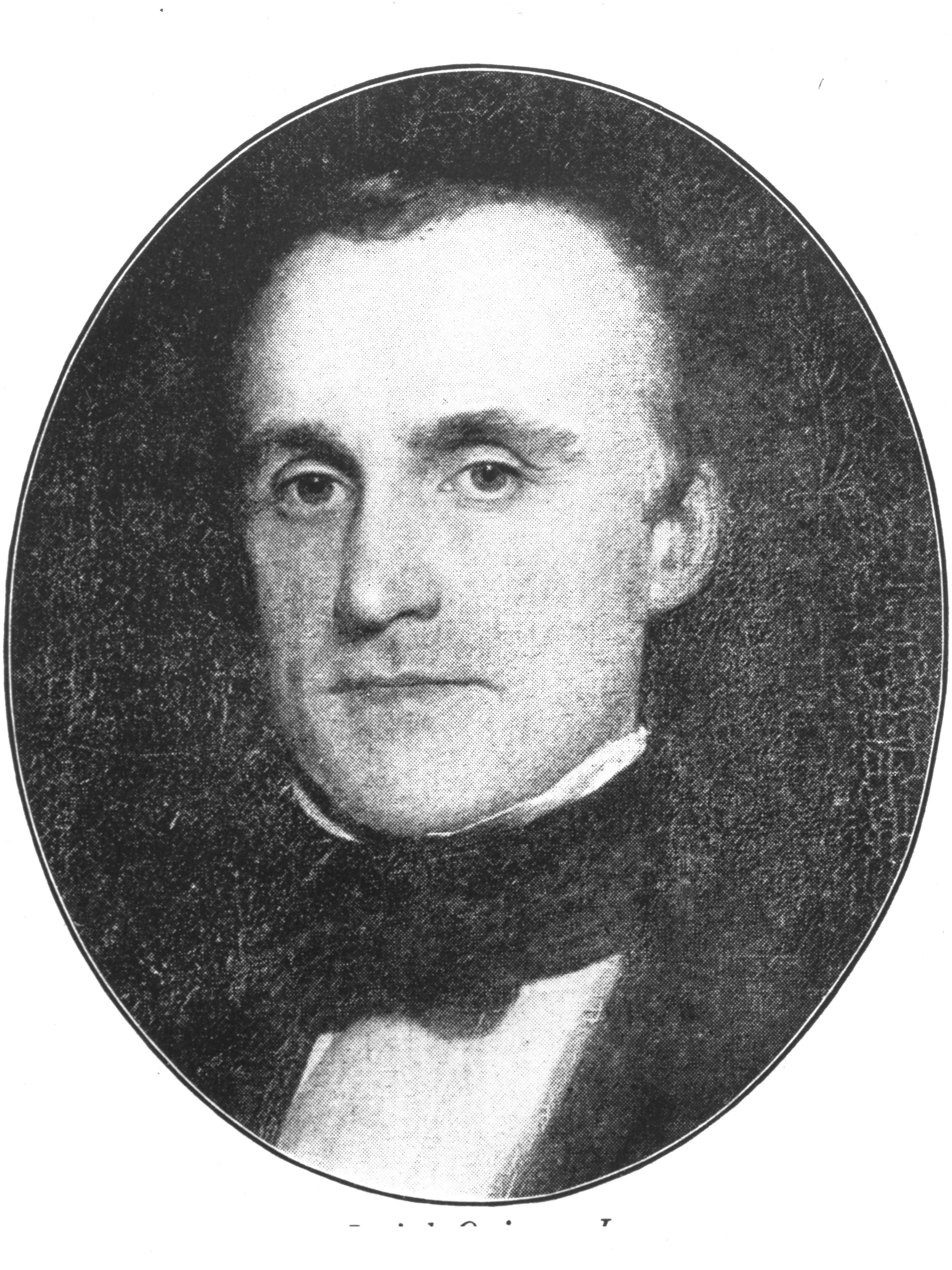

| Candidate | Josiah Quincy Jr. | Charles G. Goodrich | Ninian C. Betton |
| Party | Whig | Democratic | Know Nothing |
| Popular vote | 3,846 | 1,319 | 735 |
| Percentage | 64.62% | 22.16% | 12.35% |
Mayor before election
Josiah Quincy Jr.
Whig
Elected mayor
Josiah Quincy Jr.
Whig

The 1846 Boston mayoral election saw the reelection of Whig Party incumbent Josiah Quincy Jr. It was held on December 14, 1846.

== Candidates ==
- Ninian C. Betton ("Native American Party" –Know Nothing), former member of the Boston Common Council
- Charles G. Goodrich (Democratic Party/Locofoco)
- Josiah Quincy Jr. (Whig Party), incumbent mayor

== Campaign ==
Incumbent mayor Josiah Quincy Jr. was a strong front-runner. Whigs performed strongly in the coinciding city elections that year.

== Results ==
1846 Boston mayoral election
| Party | Candidate | Votes | % |
|---|---|---|---|
| Whig | Josiah Quincy Jr. (incumbent) | 3,846 | 64.62 |
| Democratic | Charles B. Goodrich | 1,319 | 22.16 |
| Know Nothing | Ninian C. Betton | 735 | 12.35 |
| Scattering | Other | 52 | 0.87 |
| Total votes | | 5,952 | 100 |

== See also ==
- List of mayors of Boston, Massachusetts
