= 1846 Philadelphia mayoral election =

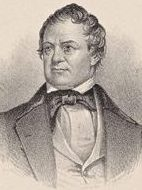

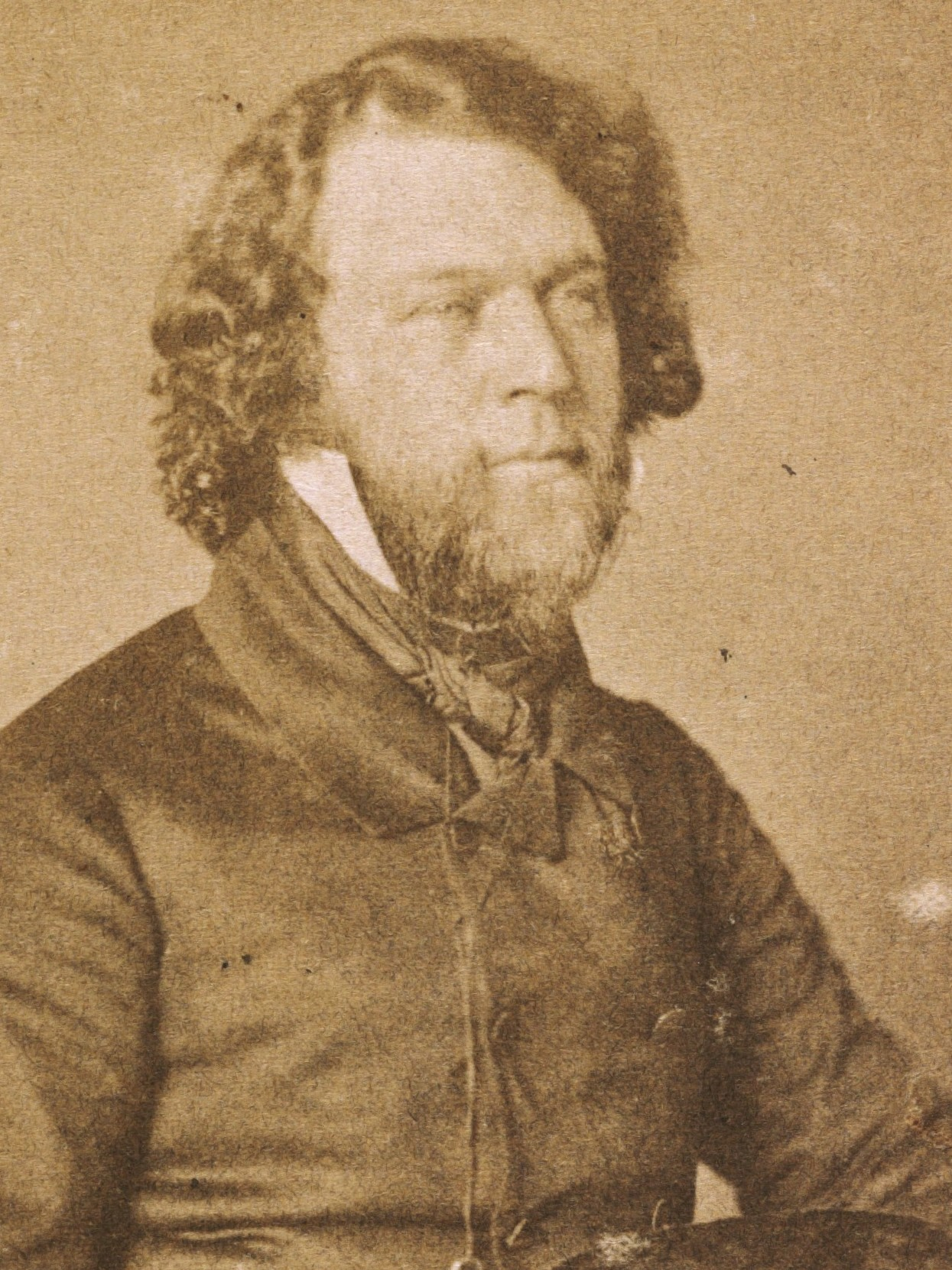

Nominee	John Swift	Richard Vaux	Peter A. Brown
General election vote	5,562	3,402	3,244
General election percentage	45.40%	27.77%	26.48%
City Council vote	30	0
City Council percentage	100%	0.00%
Mayor before election
John Swift
Whig
Elected mayor
John Swift
Whig

The 1846 Philadelphia mayoral election saw John Swift reelected to office for a tenth overall non-consecutive term.

== Electoral system ==
Beginning in 1839, the city operated under a mixed electoral system. Citizens voted for mayor in a general election. If a candidate receive a majority of the vote, they would be elected mayor. However, if no candidate received a majority, the City Council would select a mayor from the top-two finishers.

== Results ==
=== General election ===
1846 Philadelphia mayoral election results (general election)
Candidate	Votes	%
John Swift (incumbent)	5,562	45.40%
Richard Vaux	3,402	27.77%
Peter A. Brown	3,244	26.48%
Thomas Hansell	31	0.25%
Others	11	0.09%
Total votes	12,250	

=== City Council (runoff) ===
1846 Philadelphia mayoral election results (City Council runoff)
Candidate	Votes	%
John Swift (incumbent)	30	100%
Richard Vaux	0	0.00%
Total votes	30	
