= 1844 Philadelphia mayoral election =

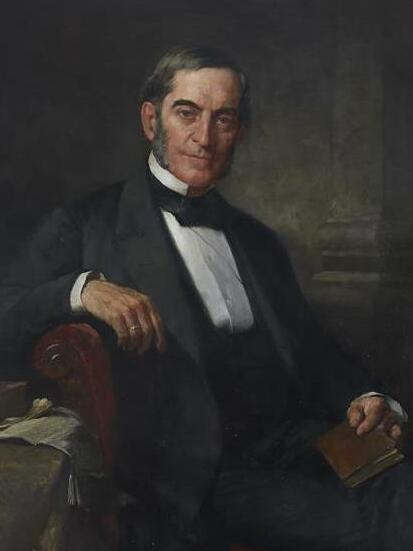

Nominee	Peter McCall	Elhanan W. Keyser	Samuel Badger
Party	Whig	Know Nothing	Democratic
General election vote	5,506	5,065	4,032
General election percentage	37.69%	34.67%	27.60%
City Council vote	30	0
City Council percentage	100%	0.00%
Mayor before election
John Morin Scott
Whig
Elected mayor
Peter McCall
Whig

The 1844 Philadelphia mayoral election saw the election of Peter McCall.

== Electoral system ==
Beginning in 1839, the city operated under a mixed electoral system. Citizens voted for mayor in a general election. If a candidate receive a majority of the vote, they would be elected mayor. However, if no candidate received a majority, the City Council would select a mayor from the top-two finishers.

== Results ==
=== General election ===
1844 Philadelphia mayoral election results (general election)
Party	Candidate	Votes	%
Whig	Peter McCall	5,506	37.69%
Know Nothing	Elhanan W. Keyser	5,065	34.67%
Democratic	Samuel Badger	4,032	27.60%
Other	Others	7	0.05%
Total votes		14,610	

=== City Council (runoff) ===
1844 Philadelphia mayoral election results (City Council runoff)
Party	Candidate	Votes	%
Whig	Peter McCall	30	100%
Know Nothing	Elhanan W. Keyser	0	0.00%
Total votes		30	
