= 1841 Philadelphia mayoral election =

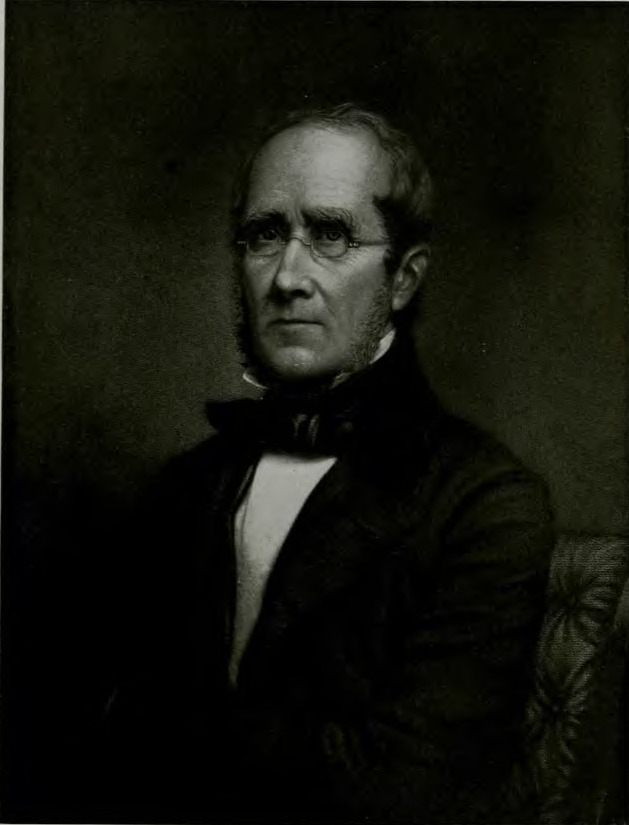

Nominee	John Morin Scott	Samuel Badger
Party	Whig
Popular vote	5,658	4,693
Percentage	54.17%	44.93%
Mayor before election
John Swift
Whig
Elected mayor
John Morin Scott
Whig

The 1841 Philadelphia mayoral election saw the election of John Morin Scott.

== Electoral system ==
Beginning in 1839, the city operated under a mixed electoral system. Citizens voted for mayor in a general election. If a candidate receive a majority of the vote, they would be elected mayor. However, if no candidate received a majority, the City Council would select a mayor from the top-two finishers.

== Results ==
1841 Philadelphia mayoral election results
Party	Candidate	Votes	%
Whig	John Morin Scott	5,658	54.17%
	Samuel Badger	4,693	44.93%
	William Thompson	84	0.80%
Total votes		10,445	100.00%
