= 1848 Philadelphia mayoral election =

Election in Philadelphia, Pennsylvania

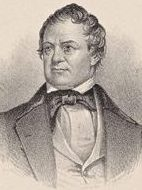

Nominee	John Swift	Samuel Badger
Popular vote	8,440	5,079
Percentage	62.09%	37.36%
Mayor before election
John Swift
Whig
Elected mayor
John Swift
Whig

The 1848 Philadelphia mayoral election saw the reelection of John Swift to a twelfth overall non-consecutive term.

== Electoral system ==
Beginning in 1839, the city operated under a mixed electoral system. Citizens voted for mayor in a general election. If a candidate receive a majority of the vote, they would be elected mayor. However, if no candidate received a majority, the City Council would select a mayor from the top-two finishers.

== Results ==
1848 Philadelphia mayoral election results
Candidate	Votes	%
John Swift (incumbent)	8,440	62.09%
Samuel Badger	5,079	37.36%
Thomas Wattson	75	0.55%
Total votes	13,594	
