= 1845 Philadelphia mayoral election =

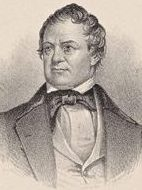

Nominee	John Swift	Elhanan W. Keyser	James Page
General election vote	4,979	4,538	3,946
General election percentage	36.77%	33.51%	29.14%
City Council vote	31	0
City Council percentage	100%	0.00%
Mayor before election
Peter McCall
Whig
Elected mayor
John Swift
Whig

The Philadelphia mayoral election of 1845 saw John Swift return to office for a ninth overall non-consecutive term.

== Electoral system ==
Beginning in 1839, the city operated under a mixed electoral system. Citizens voted for mayor in a general election. If a candidate receive a majority of the vote, they would be elected mayor. However, if no candidate received a majority, the City Council would select a mayor from the top-two finishers.

== Results ==
=== General election ===
1845 Philadelphia mayoral election results (general election)
Candidate	Votes	%
John Swift	4,979	36.77%
Elhanan W. Keyser	4,538	33.51%
James Page	3,946	29.14%
John Bouvier	78	0.58%
Total votes	13,541	

=== City Council (runoff) ===
1845 Philadelphia mayoral election results (City Council runoff)
Candidate	Votes	%
John Swift	31	100%
John K. Kane	0	0.00%
Total votes	31	
