= 1849 Philadelphia mayoral election =

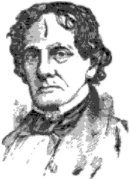

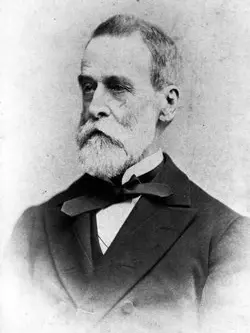
Nominee	Joel Jones	Charles Gilpin
Party	Independent	Whig
Popular vote	6,429	6,364
Percentage	50.19%	49.68%
Mayor before election
John Swift
Whig
Elected mayor
Joel Jones
Independent

The 1849 Philadelphia mayoral election saw the election of Joel Jones.

== Electoral system ==
Beginning in 1839, the city operated under a mixed electoral system. Citizens voted for mayor in a general election. If a candidate receive a majority of the vote, they would be elected mayor. However, if no candidate received a majority, the City Council would select a mayor from the top-two finishers.

== Results ==
1849 Philadelphia mayoral election results
Party	Candidate	Votes	%
Independent	Joel Jones	6,429	50.19%
Whig	Charles Gilpin	6,364	49.68%
Other	Other	16	0.13%
Total votes		12,809	
