= List of riots in Philadelphia =

List of notable incidents of civil unrest in Philadelphia

The following is a partial list of riots and protests involving violent disorder that have occurred in Philadelphia:

- 1704 Riot of Young Gentry in Philadelphia
- 1715 riot by supporters of Reverend Francis Phillips, who had been arrested for stating he had slept with three prominent local women
- 1726 riot against pillory and stocks
- 1738 riot against restrictions on fish weirs and racks on the Schuykill River
- Philadelphia Election riot, a conflict in 1742 over the political balance between Quakers and Anglicans
- 1834 Philadelphia race riot, where a white mob attacked African Americans in Moyamensing
- Pennsylvania Hall riot, an 1838 riot where a venue was attacked by anti-abolitionists
- Lombard Street riot, an 1842 riot where black freemen were attacked by an Irish Catholic mob
- Philadelphia nativist riots, in May and June 1844, against Irish Catholic immigrants
- The South Philadelphia Food Riots (including the Sugar Refinery Riot) of 1917
- Race riots in Philadelphia during the 1919 Red Summer, a series of riots against Southern black migration to the city
- 1964 Philadelphia race riot, one of the first in the civil rights era, triggered by police brutality
- George Floyd protests in Philadelphia in 2020
- Walter Wallace riots, a police killing that led to riots in 2020
