= 1851 Philadelphia mayoral election =

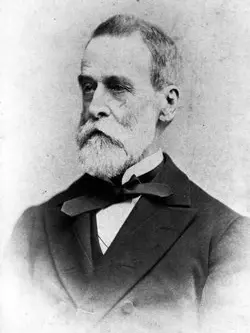

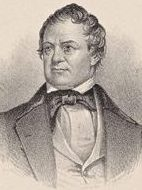
Nominee	Charles Gilpin	John Swift
Party	Whig	Democratic
Popular vote	9,275	3,934
Percentage	70.22%	29.78%
Mayor before election
Charles Gilpin
Whig
Elected mayor
Charles Gilpin
Whig

The 1851 Philadelphia mayoral election saw the reelection of Charles Gilpin.

== Electoral system ==
Beginning in 1839, the city operated under a mixed electoral system. Citizens voted for mayor in a general election. If a candidate receive a majority of the vote, they would be elected mayor. However, if no candidate received a majority, the City Council would select a mayor from the top-two finishers.

== Results ==
1851 Philadelphia mayoral election results
Party	Candidate	Votes	%
Whig	Charles Gilpin (incumbent)	9,275	70.22%
Democratic	John Swift	3,934	29.78%
Total votes		13,209	
