= 1850 Philadelphia mayoral election =

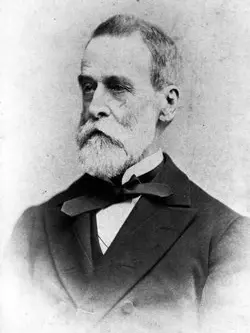

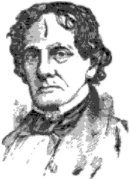
Nominee	Charles Gilpin	Joel Jones
Party	Whig	Independent
Popular vote	7,363	5,081
Percentage	58.88%	40.63%
Mayor before election
Joel Jones
Independent
Elected mayor
Charles Gilpin
Whig

The 1850 Philadelphia mayoral election saw the reelection of Charles Gilpin.

== Electoral system ==
Beginning in 1839, the city operated under a mixed electoral system. Citizens voted for mayor in a general election. If a candidate receive a majority of the vote, they would be elected mayor. However, if no candidate received a majority, the City Council would select a mayor from the top-two finishers.

== Results ==
1850 Philadelphia mayoral election results
Party	Candidate	Votes	%
Whig	Charles Gilpin	7,363	58.88%
Independent	Joel Jones (incumbent)	5,081	40.63%
Independent	W. J. A. Birkey	46	0.37%
Other	Other	16	0.13%
Total votes		12,506	
