= 1852 Philadelphia mayoral election =

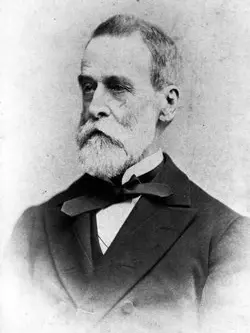

Nominee	Charles Gilpin	William Badger
Party	Whig	Independent
Popular vote	8,792	4,328
Percentage	64.99%	31.99%
Mayor before election
Charles Gilpin
Whig
Elected mayor
Charles Gilpin
Whig

The 1852 Philadelphia mayoral election saw the reelection of Charles Gilpin to a third consecutive term.

== Electoral system ==
Beginning in 1839, the city operated under a mixed electoral system. Citizens voted for mayor in a general election. If a candidate receive a majority of the vote, they would be elected mayor. However, if no candidate received a majority, the City Council would select a mayor from the top-two finishers.

== Results ==
1852 Philadelphia mayoral election results
Party	Candidate	Votes	%
Whig	Charles Gilpin (incumbent)	8,792	64.99%
Independent	William Badger	4,328	31.99%
Independent	John S. Warner	408	3.02%
Total votes		13,528	
