= 1853 Philadelphia mayoral election =

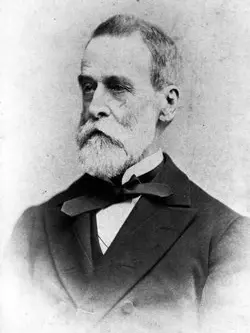

Nominee	Charles Gilpin	John Thompson
Party	Whig	Independent
Popular vote	8,002	4,392
Percentage	64.56%	35.44%
Mayor before election
Charles Gilpin
Whig
Elected mayor
Charles Gilpin
Whig

The 1853 Philadelphia mayoral election saw the reelection of Charles Gilpin to a fourth consecutive term.

This would ultimately be the last mayoral election before Philadelphia's county-city consolidation. It would also be the last held for a single-year term as Philadelphia mayor.

== Electoral system ==
Beginning in 1839, the city operated under a mixed electoral system. Citizens voted for mayor in a general election. If a candidate receive a majority of the vote, they would be elected mayor. However, if no candidate received a majority, the City Council would select a mayor from the top-two finishers.

== Results ==
1853 Philadelphia mayoral election results
Party	Candidate	Votes	%
Whig	Charles Gilpin (incumbent)	8,002	64.56%
Independent	John Thompson	4,392	35.44%
Total votes		12,394	
