= James Page (American politician) =

James Page (March 8, 1795 – April 6, 1875) was an American attorney, military officer, and government official who was the Postmaster of Philadelphia from 1833 to 1841, Philadelphia County Treasurer from 1842 to 1844, and Collector of Customs for the Port of Philadelphia from 1846 to 1849.

== Early life ==
Page was born in Philadelphia on March 8, 1795. He worked as an office boy for Peter A. Browne, who encouraged him to study law. He was admitted to the bar in 1816.

== Military service ==
Page enlisted Old Guard State Fencibles in 1814 and served at during the War of 1812. After the war, he elected captain. He eventually became a Colonel and commander of the 2nd Regiment. He resigned from the Fencibles at the start of the American Civil War because he was too old for active service.

== Politics ==
Page was a member of the Democratic Party. From 1830 to 1831, he was president of the Philadelphia Common Council. He was appointed postmaster of Andrew Jackson and retained by his successor, Martin Van Buren, serving from 1833 to 1841. From 1842 to 1844, he was treasurer of Philadelphia County. He finished third in the 1845 Philadelphia mayoral election behind John Swift and Elhanan W. Keyser. He was appointed collector of the port of Philadelphia by James K. Polk and served from August 5, 1846, to May 9, 1849. From 1866 to 1868, Page was a member of the Philadelphia Select Council.

== Clubs ==
Page was a prominent member of the Philadelphia Skating Club and Humane Society and was known as a "wonderfully proficient" skater. He was Grand Master of the Grand Lodge of Pennsylvania from 1846 to 1847. He chaired the building fund for the Masonic Temple on Broad Street.

== Death and honors ==
Page died on April 6, 1875, at his home in Philadelphia. The James Page Library Company was named in honor of Page.
