= List of elections in 1850 =

The following elections occurred in the year 1850.

== Europe ==
- 1850 Belgian general election
- 1850 Dutch general election
- 1850 Greek legislative election
- 1850 Norwegian parliamentary election

== North America ==
=== Central America ===
- 1850 Salvadoran presidential election

=== United States ===
- 1850 New York state election
- 1850 United States elections

==== United States Senate ====
- 1850 and 1851 United States Senate elections

==== United States House of Representatives ====
- 1850 United States House of Representatives elections
- 1850 United States House of Representatives election in Florida
- 1850 Iowa's 1st congressional district special election

==== United States lieutenant gubernatorial ====
- 1850 Connecticut lieutenant gubernatorial election

==== United States gubernatorial ====
- 1850 Connecticut gubernatorial election
- 1850 Delaware gubernatorial election
- 1850 Iowa gubernatorial election
- 1850 Maine gubernatorial election
- 1850 Maryland gubernatorial election
- 1849-50 Massachusetts gubernatorial election
- 1850-51 Massachusetts gubernatorial election
- 1850 New Hampshire gubernatorial election
- 1850 New Jersey gubernatorial election
- 1850 New York gubernatorial election
- 1850 North Carolina gubernatorial election
- 1850 Ohio gubernatorial election
- 1850 Rhode Island gubernatorial election
- 1850 South Carolina gubernatorial election
- 1850 Vermont gubernatorial election

==== United States mayoral elections ====
- 1850 Boston mayoral election
- 1850 Chicago mayoral election
- 1850 Manchester, New Hampshire, mayoral election
- 1850 New York City mayoral election
- 1850 Philadelphia mayoral election

== See also ==
- Category:1850 elections
