= 1834 Philadelphia race riot =

Anti-Black incident in the United States

- Flying Horses riot Part of mass racial violence in the United States
- Date: August 12–14, 1834
- Location: Philadelphia, Pennsylvania, United States; 39°56′32″N 75°9′14″W

Casualties
- Deaths: 2
- Arrested: 60

A race riot took place in Philadelphia, Pennsylvania, United States in August 1834. The riot, in which a mob of several hundred white people attacked African Americans living in the area, began on the evening of August 12 and lasted for several days, dying down from August 14 to 16.

The riot took place during a time when many cities in the northern United States were experiencing incidents of mass civil disorder, usually in the form of riots that targeted specific religious, national, or racial groups, such as an 1831 race riot in Providence, Rhode Island, and the 1834 Ursuline Convent riots near Boston. In Philadelphia, this period coincided with a significant growth in population, particularly among African Americans and Irish immigrants. While there had been a strong community of working class black freedmen in Philadelphia since the early 1800s, tensions began to build through the 1830s, with restrictions on African Americans' participation in civic life and incidents of racial violence, such as in an 1829 incident where members of a black church were attacked. In early August 1834, there were several instances of violence against African Americans in the city, including an attack on the son of well-known black businessman James Forten by a white mob.

On August 12, 1834, a mob of several hundred white men, primarily Irish, attacked the Flying Horses tavern, a well-known local establishment on South Street that served both black and white people in the area, named for a popular carousel on site. The mob overpowered the black people there, destroyed the carousel and building, and traveled down South Street and into the nearby suburb of Moyamensing, where they destroyed black-owned buildings and attacked black people. Philadelphia Mayor John Swift assembled a posse of several hundred citizens to restore order, and 18 people were arrested, but rioting started again the following night, resulting in the destruction of the African Presbyterian Church and the beating death of an African American man. The next night was the last major night of rioting and saw the destruction of another church, though some minor instances of violence continued for the next few nights. In general, rioters targeted the houses of more wealthy African Americans and social spaces, such as churches and a Masonic Hall. In total, between August 12 and 16, 60 people were arrested for rioting. In the end, 44 buildings had been destroyed, including 30 houses, and two people were dead.

A citizen's committee organized to investigate the causes of the riot reported that the primary cause was a sense of anxiety among white citizens who believed that black people were out-competing them for jobs. This conclusion has been discussed by historians, who also attribute the riot to fears over interracial mixing and resentments held against more affluent African Americans by poor whites. Over the next several years, Philadelphia experienced a wave of race riots, including one the following year and the 1838 destruction of Pennsylvania Hall. Discussing this time, local author Charles Godfrey Leland wrote, "Whoever shall write a history of Philadelphia from the Thirties to the era of the Fifties will record a popular period of turbulence and outrages so extensive as to now appear almost incredible." By 1854, in part due to the riots, the county and city of Philadelphia were consolidated and a new police agency was created.

== Background ==
=== Riots in the United States ===
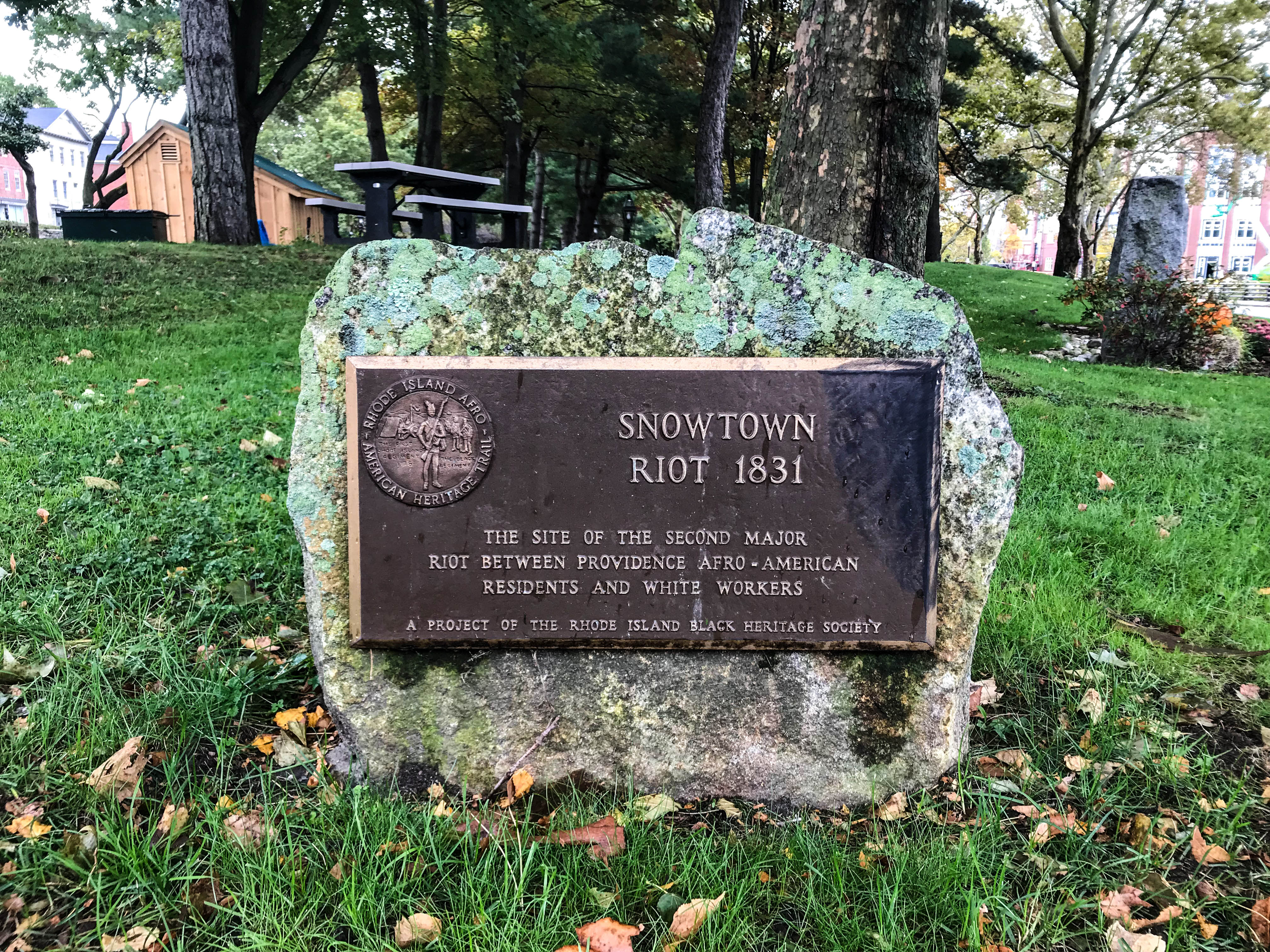
Race riots occurred in many large cities during the early 1800s, such as an 1831 riot in Providence, Rhode Island (historical marker pictured).

During the 1830s, many large cities in the northern United States, such as Boston, New York City, and Philadelphia, experienced several major riots, with causes including election disputes, labor issues, and racial tensions. According to historian David Hackett Fischer, the rise in the number of incidents in civil unrest corresponded to a long period of economic decline that the nation was experiencing in the early 1800s, with riots breaking out in major urban areas that pitted different ethnic, religious, and social groups against each other, such as Protestants against Catholics and native-born Americans against immigrants.

Starting in the 1820s, race riots, where white Americans targeted African Americans, became common occurrences in many of these cities. These events were highly violent and destructive, with an 1831 incident in Providence, Rhode Island, resulting in the destruction of an African American neighborhood, while an 1834 riot in New York City saw a church, school, and several dozen houses destroyed. Symbols of upward economic mobility among the African American community, such as church buildings and temperance halls, were often targeted as a way of maintaining a racial hierarchy of white supremacy.

While race riots were common in many cities, Cincinnati and Philadelphia experienced the most. These cities experienced at least one per year between the two between 1834 and 1836 and again from 1838 to 1842.

=== Philadelphia in the early 1800s ===
By the early 1800s, slavery in Philadelphia had been largely eliminated, with only 10 black people in the city recorded as slaves in the 1810 United States census. Additionally, the city had a large community of black freedmen and was a strong center for the abolitionist movement, with historian Manisha Sinha calling the city "the antislavery capital of the country". From the late 1700s to the early 1800s, buoyed by a strong economy, the city's African American community saw economic growth, improved living conditions and access to jobs and education, and strong civic engagement with the rest of the city. However, by the early 1800s, this trend began to reverse. In 1804, a group of young black men marched through the Philadelphia neighborhood of Southwark, threatening many of the white residents there and openly calling for rebellion. The following year, during Independence Day celebrations at Independence Hall, a mob of white people chased out black participants, putting an end to the annual integrated celebrations that had been ongoing since 1776. By the late 1820s, black people were also banned from the city's Christmas celebrations. In 1829, a riot broke out wherein members of a black church were attacked. That same year, the Pennsylvania General Assembly openly advocated for the American Colonization Society's goal of relocating freed black people in the United States to Africa, and following Nat Turner's slave rebellion in 1831, the legislature banned freedmen from entering the state and repealed fugitive slave legislation that protected escaped slaves from being sold back into slavery in the southern United States.

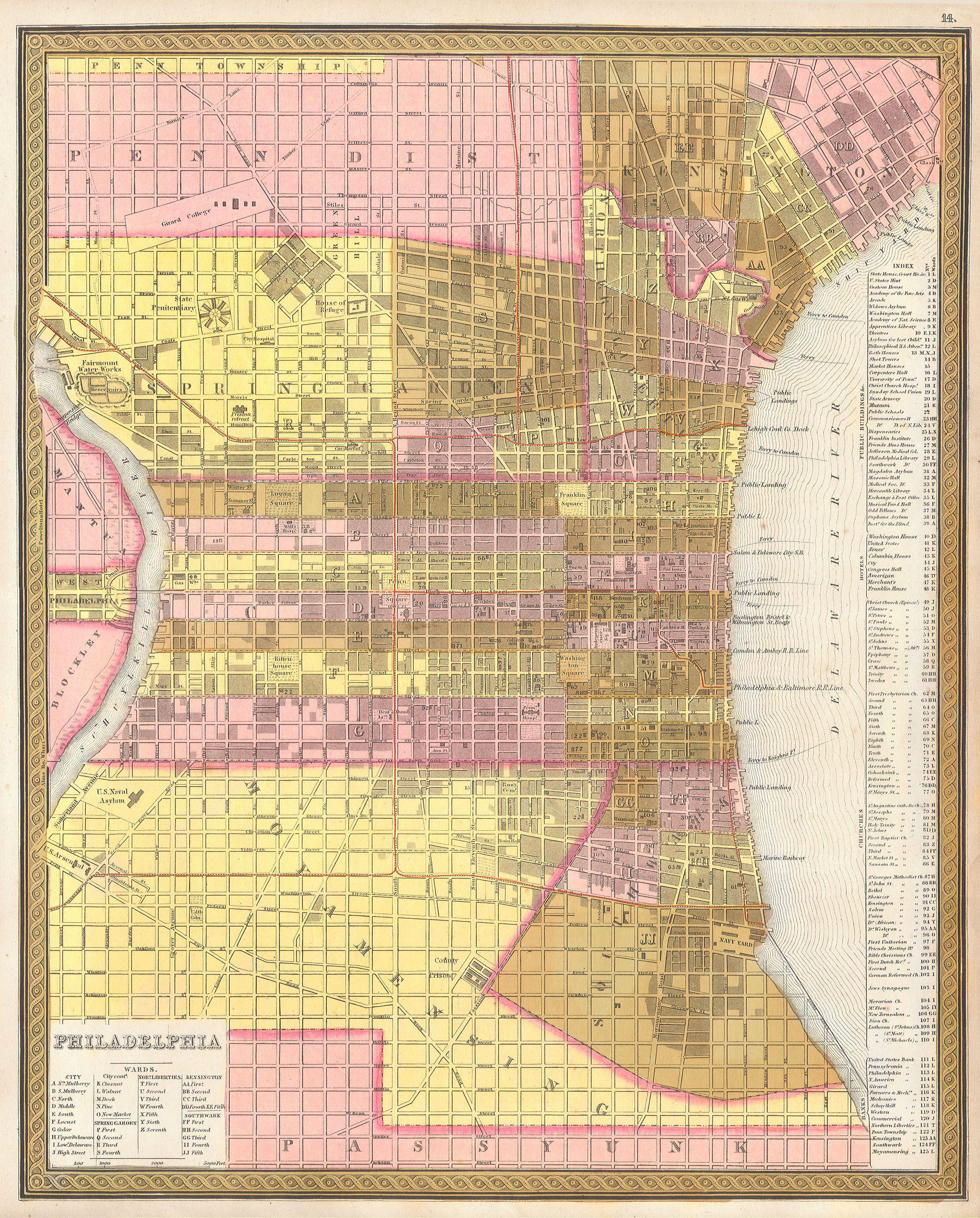
1846 map of Philadelphia, with Moyamensing in yellow near the bottom

Despite these changes, the African American population in the area continued to grow alongside the overall population, From 1820 to 1830, the number of black people living around Philadelphia grew to about 15,000, making it the largest African American community in the northern United States. Working class municipalities around Philadelphia's Center City, such as Southwark, Moyamensing, Northern Liberties, and Spring Garden, grew as residences to both African Americans and white people, primarily composed of Irish immigrants. By the 1830s, there were 29 separate jurisdictions in Philadelphia County, which were patrolled by constables who had a difficult time keeping the peace amidst the growth. In many of these places, black and white people both frequented the same shops and social places, such as taverns, which led to some incidents of violence. In some cases, white residents rented their places of lodging from black landowners, which led to further resentment among poor whites. Highlighting the resentment against African Americans during this time, historian Barbara Lewis notes that in June 1834, just two months prior to the outbreak of the race riot, performer George Washington Dixon had debuted a minstrel show featuring blackface actors playing Zip Coon, a racist caricature of an African American man, at the Arch Street Theatre to much fanfare.

=== Events prior to the riot ===
On the night of August 8, 1834, a group of African Americans attacked members of the Fairmount Engine Company, a volunteer fire company, and stole some of their equipment. At the time, private fire companies had a reputation for acts of violence due to political and gang-related activities that they were often involved in, and as a result, according to historian John Runcie, "Some sort of reaction was almost guaranteed".

The following night, a group of several dozen white youths attacked the son of James Forten, though he managed to escape with his life. Forten was a prominent African American businessman in Philadelphia and owned several properties, many of which were rented to lower class white people. According to onlookers, this group, which consisted of about 50 or 60 people wearing blue jackets and straw hats, discussed plans to meet the following Monday, August 11, with the gang's leader overheard saying, "We will then attack the niggers".

That evening, a group of white youths engaged in a physical altercation with some African Americans at a tavern on South Street, near Seventh Street. The tavern was a well-known institution in the area and housed a carousel called the Flying Horses, which was frequented by both black and white residents of the area. According to multiple accounts, the fighting started due to a dispute over seats on the ride and resulted in the mob of white youths being driven out of the establishment. Speaking about the event in a 2016 book, Sinha said that the subsequent riot had "[begun] as a fight between black and white firefighters at a carnival".

== Riot ==
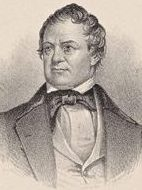
Philadelphia Mayor John Swift organized a posse of about 300 people to help restore order during the riot.

The following night, Tuesday, August 12, a mob of several hundred white people, primarily composed of working class and Irish immigrants, gathered at the Flying Horses and began rioting. The mob, which grew to about 400 or 500 people, destroyed the carousel and the building and beat any African American on sight. Following this, the mob proceeded down South Street and into Moyamensing, an impoverished, mostly African American municipality, where they continued their rioting, destroying many black-owned buildings in the process. Constables were called in from Philadelphia to help put down the disturbance, and Philadelphia Mayor John Swift assembled a posse of about 300 citizens to help restore order. During this first night of rioting, 18 individuals were arrested.

Despite the attempts by authorities in Philadelphia to end the civil unrest, rioting resumed the next night, August 13. The rioters were organized, and prior to that night's activities, many of them met in an empty lot to discuss their plans. The primary targets for the night were the African Presbyterian Church on Seventh Street and the Diving Bell, a popular grog shop. After both of these buildings were destroyed, the mob turned its attention to primarily residential buildings, breaking windows, destroying furniture, and chasing black people into the streets, where they were beaten. White people who lived in houses in the area had been told before the rioting began to light candles in their windows, and these houses were passed over during the violence. In general, the rioters targeted the houses of affluent African Americans, social spaces such as churches and a Masonic Hall, and places where black and white people tended to intermingle. In total, over 20 houses were destroyed. According to a correspondent who was at the scene, the rioters threw a corpse out of a coffin and tossed a dead baby onto the ground. The mob was eventually dispersed by law enforcement officials and a posse of several hundred citizens. By the time the mob was dispersed, one African American man had been killed and many had been seriously injured.

By August 14, Mayor Swift and Sheriff Benjamin Duncan had assembled a group of 300 constables, a troop of mounted militiamen, and had a company of the Washington Grays on reserve. Despite these precautions, more acts of rioting still occurred that night, with rioters again gathering beforehand to discuss plans. At the same location that they had met the previous night, they amassed equipment and traveled about 1.5 miles (2.4 km) to the Wharton Street Church in Southwark, which they proceeded to destroy. Additionally, rioters used codewords such as "Big Gun", "Gunner", and "Punch" to warn others of advancing law enforcement officers. Following August 14, the nightly rioting began to die down, though some sporadic incidents continued for several days. In total, 60 people were arrested for rioting in Philadelphia between August 11 and August 16.

== Aftermath ==
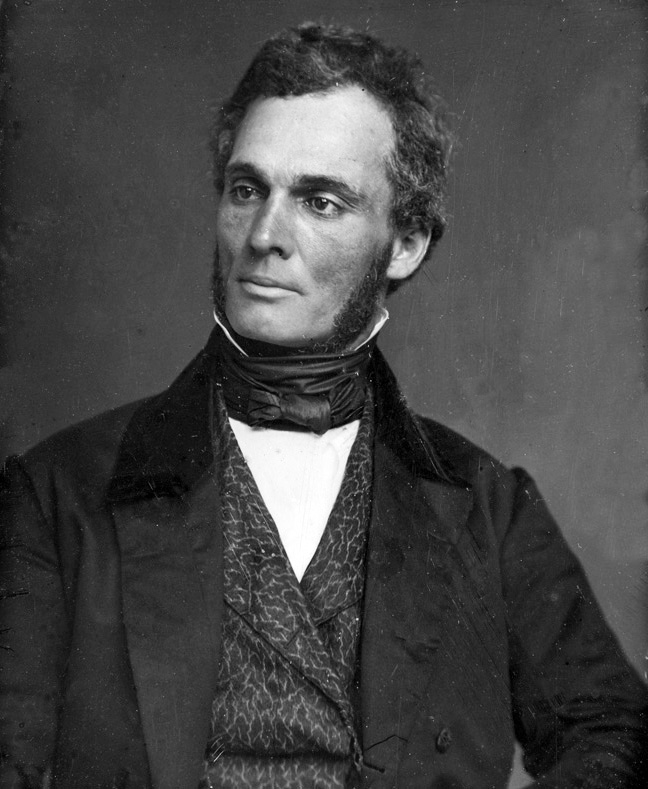
The riot prompted abolitionist Robert Purvis to move his family out of the city.

While there had been earlier instances of violence against African Americans in Philadelphia, the incident marked the first major race riot in the city's history. (Note: Multiple sources refer to the August 1834 riot as the first major race riot in the city's history. However, in 1829, the city experienced a riot which historian David Hackett Fischer referred to as "a major race riot" in a 2022 book. In a 1972 article about the 1834 riot published in the journal Pennsylvania History, historian John Runcie states, "There are many earlier instances of collective violence and racial tensions in Philadelphia's history, but this was the first time that the city had suffered a full-scale race riot. It was the first of many comparable incidents".) In total, two people died as a result of the several nights of rioting, with one person having been beaten to death and another drowning while trying to escape the mob. Many African Americans attempted to flee the city during the rioting by crossing the Delaware River and entering nearby New Jersey, while abolitionist Robert Purvis purchased a house in nearby Bristol Township, Bucks County, in part to avoid future incidents of violence. In property damage, 44 buildings had been destroyed, including over 30 houses and two churches. Estimates for the damage done during the riot range from $4,000 to $6,000, equivalent to between $129,000 and $194,000 in 2025. (Note: According to a 1972 article by historian John Runcie, a committee established to investigate the riot reported total damages of about $4,000, while Philadelphian abolitionist Lucretia Mott, the wife of one of the members of the committee, stated in a letter to a friend that the damages ranged between $5,000 and $6,000.) Many of Philadelphia's newspapers, such as The Pennsylvania Inquirer and the Gazette of the United States, extensively reported on the riot, and the event garnered national attention, with the Maryland Gazette dedicating significant editorial space to covering the violence.

=== Causes of the riot ===
After the riot, Mayor Swift created a citizen's committee to investigate the causes and results of the incident, with anti-slavery activist James Mott and journalist John Binns serving as members.

The main cause for the riot established by the committee centered on economic fears held by many poor white people regarding free black people. Among riot sympathizers, there was an attitude that black people were preferred for employment over their white counterparts, which they attributed as the cause for a high rate of unemployment among white working-class people in the city. The committee seemed sympathetic to this line of thinking in their report, stating, "many whites, who are willing and able to work, are left without employment, while colored people are provided with work, and enabled comfortably to maintain their families; and thus many white laborers, anxious for employment, are kept idle and indigent".

Several historians also noted the role that fears of miscegenation and interracial mingling among the city's white population played in the riot. Regarding the destruction of the Flying Horses tavern, historian Susan J. Stanfield notes in a 2022 book that, "Integrated public spaces, particularly those that were entertainment venues, created anxiety about race and gender mixing that often led to violence". Additionally, historian Emma Jones Lapsansky, in a 1980 article in the journal American Quarterly, notes that a later race riot in Philadelphia in 1849 was also spurred by fears of "race mixing".

Lapsansky also notes some issues with attributing the main cause of the riot to competition in the labor market, saying, "recent analysis has shown that many anti-black rioters were not in direct economic competition with black workers, that the occupations for which they were trained were ones in which blacks did not participate". Instead, Lapsansky writes that the rioters targeting the homes of more affluent African Americans represented resentments that many working class white people held against members of the upper class, stating, "Though it was not black competition, but rather new technology and new work routines that actually caused skilled whites' job displacement, "upper-class" blacks were an acceptable target for frustration, whereas upper-class whites were not".

In a 1972 article in the journal Pennsylvania History, historian John Runcie also adds that the riot may have been exacerbated by the weather at the time, as Philadelphia was experiencing a large heat wave that may have made individuals more agitated and prone to violence.

=== Later history ===
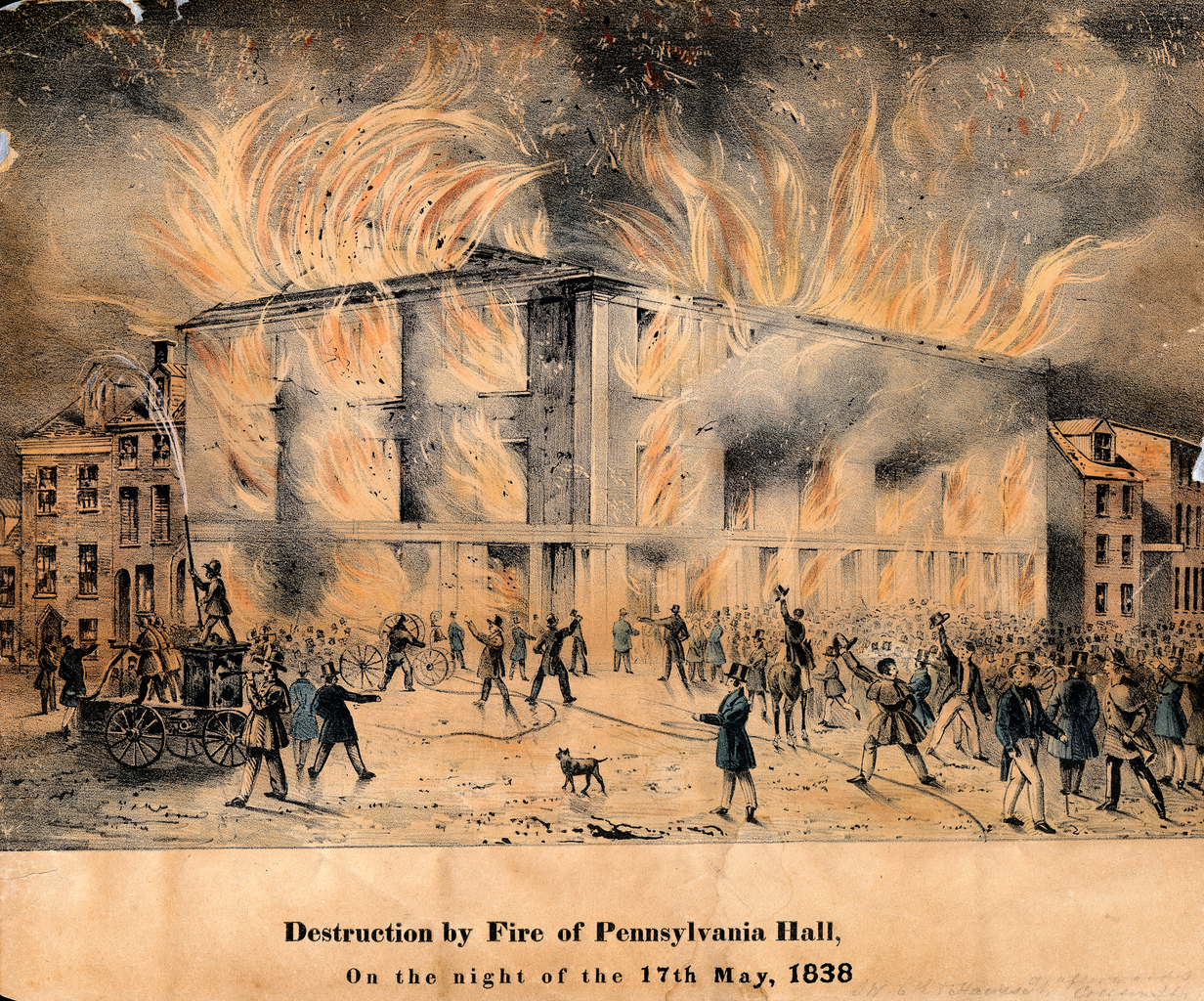
The 1838 destruction of Pennsylvania Hall was one of several instances of racial violence to occur following the riot.

The Philadelphia riot was one of many incidents of civil unrest in the country in 1834, and in fact occurred just one day after another well-known event, the Ursuline Convent riots near Boston.

Several cities experienced race riots in the immediate aftermath of the Philadelphia event, including Rochester in New York, Bloomfield and Trenton in New Jersey, and Columbia, Lancaster, and Southwark in Pennsylvania. In the years following, race riots remained a common happening in Philadelphia, with many occurring over the next several years. (Note: Sources vary on the exact number of race riots that occurred in Philadelphia during this time. In a 1975 book, historian Richard Maxwell Brown stated that, between 1824 and 1849, Philadelphia experienced "five major and four lesser race riots" for nine total. Historian Lois E. Horton wrote in a 2002 book that there were "at least nine race riots" between 1834 and 1838, while an article in the 2013 Encyclopedia of Greater Philadelphia similarly states that, between 1828 and 1849, the city experienced "five major race riots", Meanwhile, both political scientist James A. Morone in a 2003 book and journalist Mumia Abu-Jamal in a 2004 book state that there were seven race riots in Philadelphia between 1834 and 1838.) According to historian Gladys L. Knight, this wave of violence began in 1829 and did not subside until the 1850s. Some of the more infamous riots to occur during this time period included another race riot in 1835, the 1838 destruction of Pennsylvania Hall, the Lombard Street riot of 1842, nativist riots in 1844, and the California House riot in 1849.

In his memoirs, contemporary Philadelphian author Charles Godfrey Leland wrote, "Whoever shall write a history of Philadelphia from the Thirties to the era of the Fifties will record a popular period of turbulence and outrages so extensive as to now appear almost incredible". These constant acts of serial violence served as the inspiration for novelist George Lippard's 1844 book The Quaker City.

In 1838, with the passage of a new constitution, the government of Pennsylvania rescinded suffrage for African Americans. Voting rights were not restored to black Pennsylvanians until 1870, after the passage of the Fifteenth Amendment to the United States Constitution. In 1854, with the Act of Consolidation, the city and county of Philadelphia were consolidated, merging the 29 independent municipalities into one municipal authority. This was done in large part due to the constant outbreaks of violence that occurred in the county, which critics stated was due to inadequate law enforcement coverage given the fragmented nature of the county's municipalities. Shortly after the consolidation, a new police department was formed.

== See also ==
- History of African Americans in Philadelphia
- List of incidents of civil unrest in the United States
- List of riots in Philadelphia

== Sources ==
- Abu-Jamal, Mumia (2004). We Want Freedom: A Life in the Black Panther Party. Introduction by Kathleen Cleaver. Cambridge, Massachusetts: South End Press. ISBN 978-0-89608-718-7.
- Anderson, Jennifer L. (2012). Mahogany: The Costs of Luxury in Early America. Cambridge, Massachusetts: Harvard University Press. ISBN 978-0-674-06726-4.
- Bacon, Margaret Hope (2007). But One Race: The Life of Robert Purvis. Albany, New York: State University of New York Press. ISBN 978-0-7914-8042-7.
- Brown, Richard Maxwell (1975). Strain of Violence: Historical Studies of American Violence and Vigilantism. Oxford: Oxford University Press. ISBN 978-0-19-802017-2.
- Dorsey, Bruce (2002). Reforming Men and Women: Gender in the Antebellum City. Ithaca, New York: Cornell University Press. ISBN 978-0-8014-7288-6.
- Faulkner, Carol (2011). Lucretia Mott's Heresy: Abolition and Women's Rights in Nineteenth-Century America. Philadelphia: University of Pennsylvania Press. ISBN 978-0-8122-4321-5.
- Fischer, David Hackett (2022). African Founders: How Enslaved People Expanded American Ideals. New York City: Simon & Schuster. ISBN 978-1-9821-4511-8.
- Grubbs, Patrick (2015). "Riots (1830s and 1840s)". Encyclopedia of Greater Philadelphia. Mid-Atlantic Regional Center for the Humanities. Archived from the original on October 25, 2022.
- Hepburn, Sharon A. Roger (2007). Crossing the Border: A Free Black Community in Canada. Champaign, Illinois: University of Illinois Press. ISBN 978-0-252-03183-0.
- Horton, Lois E. (2002). "From Class to Race in Early America: Northern Post-Emancipation Racial Reconstruction". In Morrison, Michael A.; Stewart, James Brewer (eds.). Race and the Early Republic: Racial Consciousness and Nation-Building in the Early Republic. Lanham, Maryland: Rowman & Littlefield. pp. 55–74. ISBN 978-1-4617-1505-4.
- Howe, Daniel Walker (2007). What Hath God Wrought: The Transformation of America, 1815-1848. Oxford: Oxford University Press. ISBN 978-0-19-972657-8.
- Ignatiev, Noel (1995). How the Irish Became White. New York City: Routledge. ISBN 978-1-135-07069-4.
- Jones, Jacqueline (1998). American Work: Four Centuries of Black and White Labor. New York City: W. W. Norton & Company. ISBN 978-0-393-31833-3.
- Knight, Gladys L. (2007). "Black Nationalism". In Rucker, Walter; Upton, James Nathaniel (eds.). Encyclopedia of American Race Riots. Greenwood Milestones in African American History. Vol. 1: A–M. Foreword by Dominic J. Capeci Jr. Westport, Connecticut: Greenwood Press. pp. 45–47. ISBN 978-0-313-33301-9.
- Lapsansky, Emma Jones (Spring 1980). ""Since They Got Those Separate Churches": Afro-Americans and Racism in Jacksonian Philadelphia". American Quarterly. 32 (1). American Studies Association: 54–78. doi:10.2307/2712496. ISSN 0003-0678. JSTOR 2712496.
- Lemire, Elise (2002). "Miscegenation": Making Race in America. Philadelphia: University of Pennsylvania Press. ISBN 978-0-8122-0034-8.
- Lewis, Barbara (1996). "Daddy Blue: The Evolution of the Dark Daddy". In Bean, Annemarie; Hatch, James V.; McNamara, Brooks (eds.). Inside the Minstrel Mask: Readings in Nineteenth-Century Blackface Minstrelsy. Foreword by Mel Watkins. Middletown, Connecticut: Wesleyan University Press. pp. 257–274. ISBN 978-0-8195-6300-2.
- Lippard, George (2014). Cohen, Matt; Wong, Edlie L. (eds.). The Killers: A Narrative of Real Life in Philadelphia. Philadelphia: University of Pennsylvania Press. ISBN 978-0-8122-4624-7.
- McMaster, John Bach (1914). A History of the People of the United States, from the Revolution to the Civil War. Vol. VI: 1830–1842. New York City: D. Appleton & Company.
- Morone, James A. (2003). Hellfire Nation: The Politics of Sin in American History. New Haven, Connecticut: Yale University Press. ISBN 978-0-300-10517-9.
- Rael, Patrick (2002). Black Identity and Black Protest in the Antebellum North. Chapel Hill, North Carolina: University of North Carolina Press. ISBN 978-0-8078-7503-2.
- Runcie, John (April 1972). ""Hunting the Nigs" in Philadelphia: The Race Riot of August 1834". Pennsylvania History: A Journal of Mid-Atlantic Studies. 39 (2). Penn State University Press: 187–218. ISSN 0031-4528. JSTOR 27772015.
- Sinha, Manisha (2016). The Slave's Cause: A History of Abolition. New Haven, Connecticut: Yale University Press. ISBN 978-0-300-18208-8.
- Smith, Kimberly K. (1999). The Dominion of Voice: Riot, Reason, and Romance in Antebellum Politics. Lawrence, Kansas: University Press of Kansas. ISBN 978-0-7006-0957-4.
- Stanfield, Susan J. (2022). Rewriting Citizenship: Women, Race, and Nineteenth-Century Print Culture. Athens, Georgia: University of Georgia Press. ISBN 978-0-8203-6260-1.
- Turner, Edward Raymond (2006) [1911]. The Negro in Pennsylvania: Slavery--servitude--freedom, 1639-1861. Washington, D.C.: American Historical Association. ISBN 978-1-4611-7521-6.
- Wolfinger, James (2013). "African American Migration". Encyclopedia of Greater Philadelphia. Mid-Atlantic Regional Center for the Humanities. Archived from the original on January 10, 2023.
- Woodson, Carter G. (1922). The Negro in Our History (2nd ed.). Washington, D.C.: The Associated Publishers.
