= 1840 Philadelphia mayoral election =

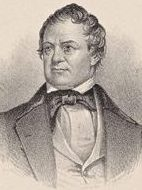

Nominee	John Swift	Henry Horn
Party	Whig	Democratic
Popular vote	6,355	4,820
Percentage	56.87%	43.13%
Mayor before election
John Swift
Whig
Elected mayor
John Swift
Whig

The 1840 Philadelphia mayoral election saw John Swift reelected to office for his eighth overall non-consecutive term.

This was the first Philadelphia mayoral election in which the mayor wound up being solely elected by the general public. Since Swift received a majority in the general election, the City Council did not select the mayor. Beginning in 1839, the city operated under a mixed electoral system. Citizens voted for mayor in a general election. If a candidate receive a majority of the vote, they would be elected mayor. However, if no candidate received a majority, the City Council would select a mayor from the top-two finishers.

== Results ==
1840 Philadelphia mayoral election results
Party	Candidate	Votes	%
Whig	John Swift (incumbent)	6,355	56.87%
Democratic	Henry Horn	4,820	43.13%
Total votes		11,175	
