= Charles Gilpin (mayor) =

Mayor of Philadelphia

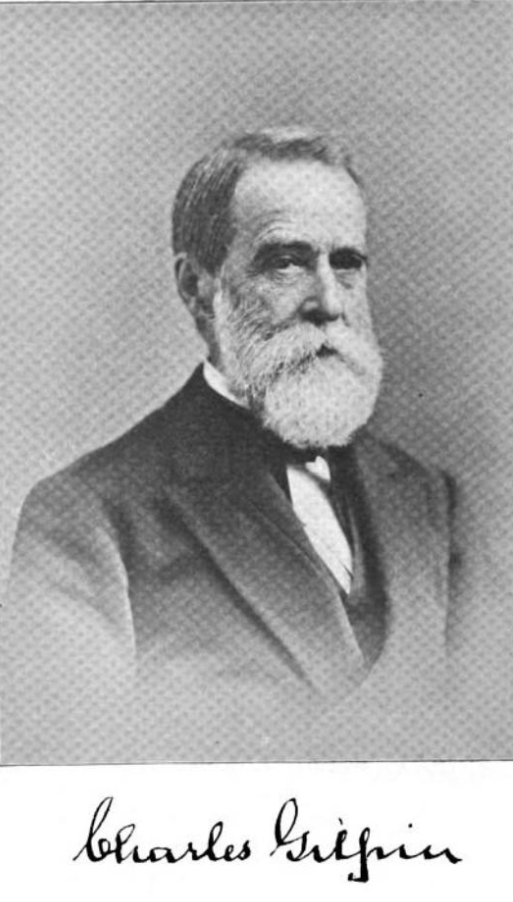

Mayor of Philadelphia
- In office October 15, 1850 – June 13, 1854
- Preceded by: Joel Jones
- Succeeded by: Robert T. Conrad

Personal details
- Born: November 17, 1809 Philadelphia, Pennsylvania, U.S.
- Died: October 29, 1891 (aged 81) Philadelphia, Pennsylvania, U.S.
- Resting place: Laurel Hill Cemetery, Philadelphia, Pennsylvania, U.S.
- Party: Whig, Republican
- Spouse: Sarah Hamilton
- Profession: Attorney

Charles Gilpin (November 17, 1809 - October 29, 1891) was an American attorney and politician. He served as the mayor of Philadelphia from 1851 to 1854 and was the last mayor of the city before the consolidation of Philadelphia.

== Early life ==
Gilpin was born on November 17, 1809, in Wilmington, Delaware, to Edward and Lydia (Grubb) Gilpin. His father Edward was a merchant whose family immigrated to the United States in the 1600s. He studied at the Germantown Academy and read law under the tutelage of Joseph Ingersoll. Gilpin was admitted to the bar in 1834 and practiced law in Philadelphia.

== Political career ==
Gilpin won a seat on the Common Council, the lower house of the Philadelphia City Council, and to the Select Council in 1840. He ran for mayor in 1849 as a member of the Whig party; but lost by a 65-vote margin to Joel Jones.

In 1850, he ran again and defeated Jones by 2,329 votes. He won re-election in 1851 over former mayor John Swift and was re-elected in 1852 and 1853. As mayor, he sat on the committee to rewrite the city charter. The consolidation combined the city of Philadelphia and Philadelphia County, created new offices such as the city treasurer, city controller, and expanded the powers of the city government. When the Whig party broke up, he joined with the Republican party.

With the change in city government, Gilpin did not run for re-election as mayor. He worked as the solicitor to the Philadelphia County Sheriff from 1858 to 1883. In 1864, President Abraham Lincoln nominated him as a United States Attorney for the Eastern District of Pennsylvania and he served in that role for four years. He was also the supervisor of elections.

== Personal life ==
He was one of the founders of the Olympic Base Ball Club which played their games in Camden, New Jersey across the river from Philadelphia.

He was a member of the Union League of Philadelphia and the Philadelphia Club.

He was a staunch supporter of the Union in the American Civil War. He was an originator and founder of the Gray Reserve Regiment in 1861. He was too old to fight in the war, but supported two substitutes who fought on his behalf.

Gilpin married Sarah Hamilton Hood, the daughter of John McClellan Hood and Elizabeth Forepaugh, on April 5, 1843 in Philadelphia, Pennsylvania. They had six children, Washington Hood Gilpin, who was an attorney in Philadelphia, Charles Jr., Lydia, Henry, Hood and Bernard.

He died October 29, 1891, in Philadelphia and was interred at Laurel Hill Cemetery.

Political offices
Preceded by Joel Jones	Mayor of Philadelphia; 1851–1854	Succeeded by Robert T. Conrad
