= Lewis Allaire Scott =

American politician

Scott's coat of arms

Lewis Allaire Scott (February 11, 1759 – March 17, 1798) was an American politician.

== Early life ==
Scott was the son of John Morin Scott (1730–1784) and Helena (née Rutgers) Scott. His elder sister, Mary Morin Scott, married John Litchfield and, after his death, Charles McKnight.

His father was the only child of John Scott, a Manhattan merchant, and Marian (née Morin) Scott. His maternal grandparents were Petrus Rutgers and Helena (née Hooglant) Rutgers.

== Career ==
After serving as Deputy Secretary of State of New York, Scott succeeded his father to become as the second Secretary of State of New York in 1784, serving until his death in office in 1798.

== Personal life ==
On January 18, 1785, he married Julianna Sitgreaves, a daughter of William Sitgreaves and Susanna (née Deshone) Sitgreaves. She was also sister to U.S. Representative Samuel Sitgreaves. Together, they were the parents of:

- John Morin Scott (1789–1858), the Mayor of Philadelphia who married Mary Emlen, a daughter of George Emlen and Sarah (née Fishbourne) Emlen.

He died on March 17, 1798, and was interred at Trinity Church in Manhattan.

Political offices
Preceded by John Morin Scott	Secretary of State of New York; 1784–1798	Succeeded by Daniel Hale
