= Race riots in Philadelphia during the 1919 Red Summer =

Race riots in Philadelphia
- Part of the Red Summer
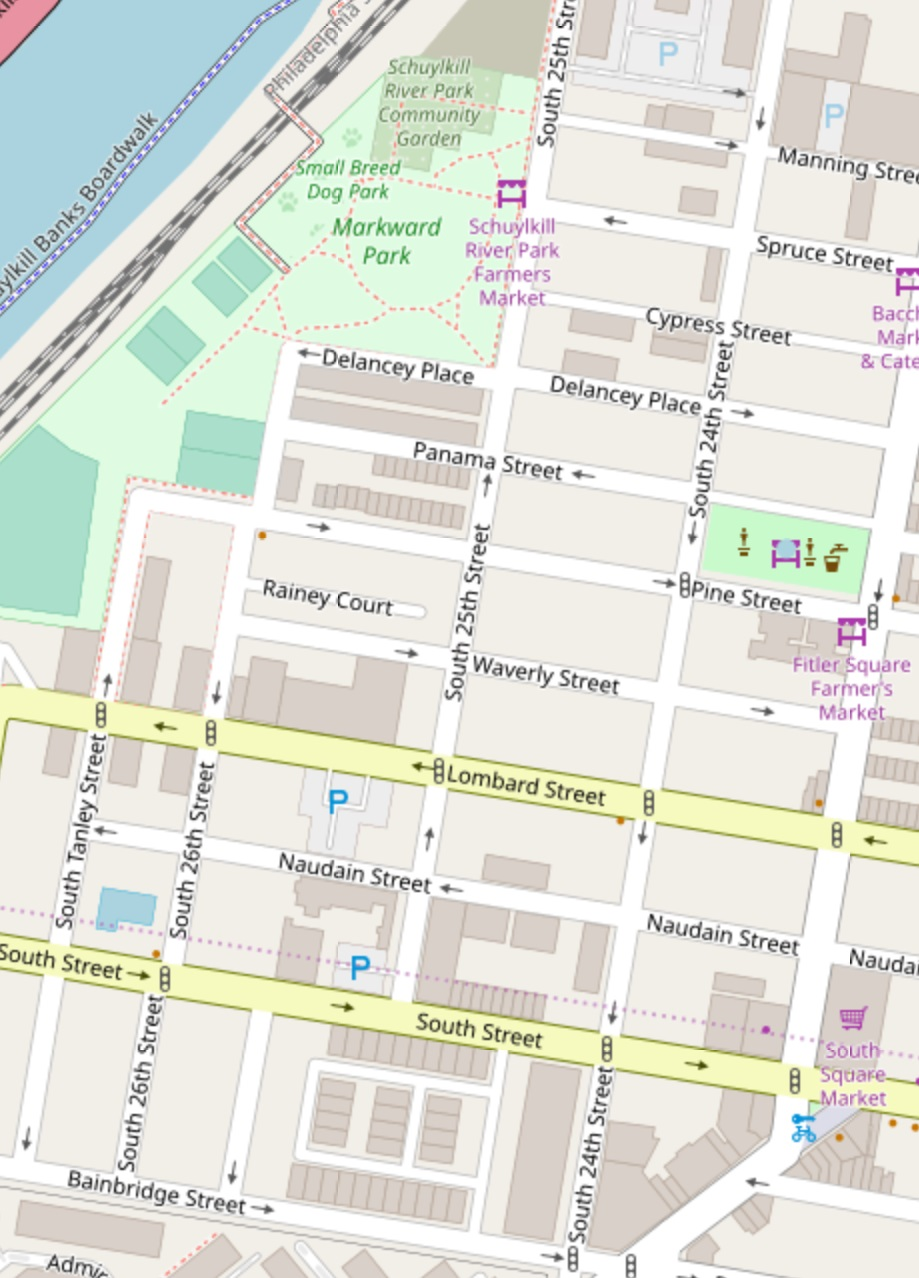
- 25h and Pine street, where the May 9 riot took place
- Date: 1919 Red Summer
- Location: Philadelphia, United States

There were a number of race riots in Philadelphia during the 1919 Red Summer.

== Background ==
As more and more African-Americans moved from the south to the industrial north, they started to move into predominantly white neighborhoods. In 1918, for four days starting July 25, there was a race riot in Chester and Philadelphia. When things finally settled down, three black and two white people had died from their injuries.

== May 1919 ==
In Philadelphia, the black migration created very high tensions in the area surrounding Twenty-fifth and Pine streets. Making things worse, a local gang had been terrorizing the new black tenants. On May 9, a large mob of white people clashed with a large black group. The mob then broke open the door at 2535 Pine street and tried to eject George Grahm and his black family who had moved there a week earlier. A number of people were later arrested.

== July 1919 ==
The New York Times wrote an article that described two riots during the Red Summer, on July 7 and 31. Authors Rucker and Upton talk about during a carnival, a large group of whites fought a group of blacks. The violence was quickly suppressed when over 100 police showed up and made arrests.

== Aftermath ==
This uprising was one of several incidents of civil unrest that took place during the so-called Red Summer of 1919. The Summer consisted of terrorist attacks on black communities, and white oppression, in over three dozen cities and counties. In most cases, white mobs attacked African-American neighborhoods. In some cases, black community groups resisted the attacks, especially in Chicago and Washington, D.C. Most deaths occurred in rural areas during events like the Elaine massacre in Arkansas, where an estimated 100 to 240 black people and 5 white people were killed. Also occurring in 1919 were the Chicago Race Riot and Washington D.C. race riot which killed 38 and 39 people respectively, with both events having many more non-fatal injuries and extensive property damage reaching millions of dollars.

== See also ==
- 1964 Philadelphia race riot
- List of riots in Philadelphia
- Washington race riot of 1919
- Mass racial violence in the United States
- List of incidents of civil unrest in the United States

== Bibliography ==
Notes

References

- The Kansas City Sun (July 26, 1919). "Riot in Philadelphia". The Kansas City Sun. Kansas City, Missouri: N.C. Crews. pp. 1–8. ISSN 2166-8329. OCLC 21244408.
- The New York Times (October 5, 1919). "For Action on Race Riot Peril". The New York Times. New York, NY. ISSN 1553-8095. OCLC 1645522.
- Rucker, Walter C.; Upton, James N. (2007). Encyclopedia of American Race Riots, Volume 2. Greenwood Publishing Group. ISBN 9780313333026. - Total pages: 930
- Voogd, Jan (2008). Race Riots and Resistance: The Red Summer of 1919. Peter Lang. ISBN 9781433100673. - Total pages: 234
