= Isaac Roach =

American politician (1786–1848)

62nd Mayor of Philadelphia
- In office October 16, 1838 – October 15, 1839
- Preceded by: John Swift
- Succeeded by: John Swift

Personal details
- Born: February 24, 1786
- Died: December 29, 1848 (aged 62) Philadelphia, Pennsylvania, U.S.
- Party: Democratic
- Spouse: Mary Huddell (m. 1819)
- Occupation: Politician, lawyer

Military service
- Allegiance: United States
- Branch/service: United States Army
- Rank: Major
- Battles/wars: War of 1812

Isaac Roach (February 24, 1786 – December 29, 1848) was an American lawyer and politician who served one term as mayor of Philadelphia, from 1838 to 1839. He was a captain in the United States Army and fought in the War of 1812. He was brevetted to Major in April 1823, and resigned from the army on April 1, 1824. He became the mayor of Philadelphia in 1838 and was later appointed the Treasurer of the Mint.

On October 4, 1819, Roach married Mary Huddell.

Roach died in 1848 in Philadelphia, where he is buried in St. Peter's churchyard.

Political offices
Preceded by John Swift	Mayor of Philadelphia; 1838–1839	Succeeded by John Swift
