= John Morin Scott (mayor) =

American politician (1789-1858)

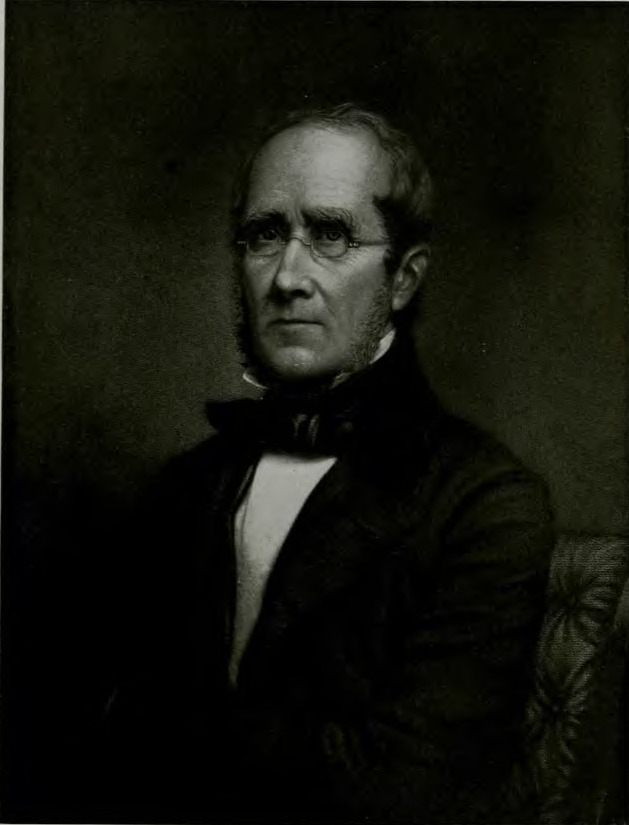

63rd Mayor of Philadelphia
- In office 1841–1844
- Preceded by: John Swift
- Succeeded by: Peter McCall

President of the Select Council for Philadelphia
- In office 1826–1832

Member of the Pennsylvania House of Representatives
- In office 1815–1816, 1839

Personal details
- Born: October 25, 1789 New York City, U.S.
- Died: April 3, 1858 (aged 68) Philadelphia, Pennsylvania, U.S.
- Resting place: Laurel Hill Cemetery, Philadelphia, Pennsylvania, U.S.
- Party: Whig
- Spouse: Mary Emlen
- Relations: Lewis Allaire Scott (father); John Morin Scott (grandfather)
- Children: 8
- Education: Princeton University
- Occupation: Lawyer, politician

John Morin Scott (October 25, 1789 – April 3, 1858) was an American politician who served as a Whig Party member of the Pennsylvania House of Representatives from 1815 to 1816, and again in 1839. He served several terms in the Common and Select Councils for Philadelphia and as president of the Select Council for Philadelphia from 1826 to 1832.

He served as the 63rd mayor of Philadelphia from 1841 to 1844 and was the first mayor of Philadelphia elected by popular vote rather than through appointment by the city councils. As mayor, he oversaw a turbulent time in Philadelphia history including the Lombard Street Riot and the Philadelphia Nativist Riots. He survived an assassination attempt in 1843 when he was shot in the back by a visitor to the mayor's office.

== Early life and education ==
Scott was born on October 25, 1789, in New York, New York, to Lewis Allaire Scott and Juliana Sitgreaves. He graduated from Princeton University in 1805, and moved with his mother and sister to Philadelphia around 1807. He read law at the office of William Rawle, was admitted to the Philadelphia bar on September 2, 1811, and the bar of the Supreme Court of Pennsylvania on December 28, 1811. He worked as a lawyer in Philadelphia. He served as a lieutenant in the Second Troop Philadelphia City Cavalry regiment at Camp DuPont during the War of 1812.

== Career ==
He was a member of the Whig Party. He served as a member of the Pennsylvania House of Representatives from 1815 to 1816, and again in 1839, by which time he had become a member of the board of trustees of Lafayette College, on which he served from 1826 to 1847. He served several terms in both the Common and Select City Councils for Philadelphia and was elected president of the Select Council for Philadelphia from 1826 to 1832. He was nominated as a Whig candidate for representative in the United States Congress but declined the offer. He served as a member of the Constitutional Convention for the State of Pennsylvania from 1837 to 1838.

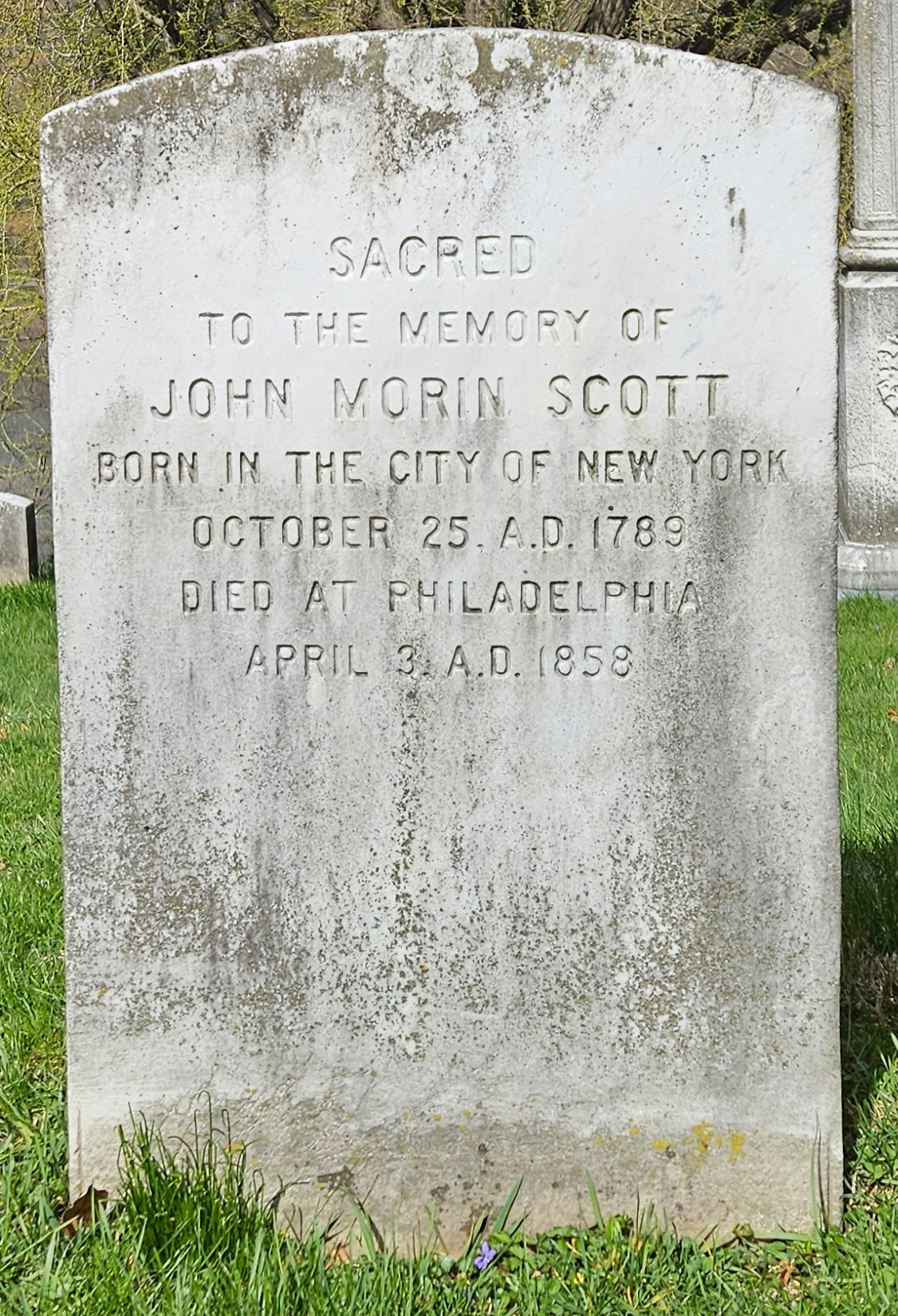
John Morin Scott tombstone in Laurel Hill Cemetery

He was elected mayor of Philadelphia in 1841 and served for three years. He was the first Philadelphia mayor to obtain the office through election by popular vote rather than by appointment of the city councils. As mayor, he oversaw a turbulent time in Philadelphia history. During the 1842 Lombard Street riot, Scott and Philadelphia constables responded to the racial violence by mostly arresting black victims. On May 3, 1843, he survived an assassination attempt when he was shot in the back by a visitor to the mayor's office. During the 1844 Philadelphia Nativist Riots, Scott deployed the Pennsylvania Militia to protect Catholic properties and pleaded with rioters to spare the destruction of St. Augustine Church. He was hit in the chest with a rock thrown by protestors and the church was burned. Scott left this post in 1844; he died in Philadelphia on April 3, 1858, and was interred at Laurel Hill Cemetery.

== Personal life ==
He married Mary Emlen in 1817 and together they had eight children. He was the grandson of New York City lawyer, John Morin Scott.

Preceded by John Swift	Mayor of Philadelphia; 1841–1844	Succeeded by Peter McCall
