= John Morin Scott =

American politician (1730–1784)

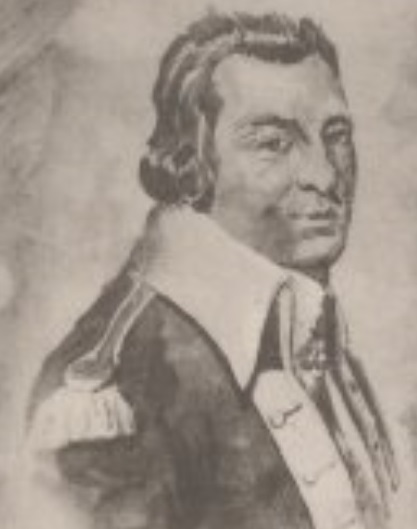
- From a 1777 drawing by John Trumbull

1st Secretary of State of New York
- In office March 13, 1778 – September 14, 1784
- Preceded by: Inaugural holder
- Succeeded by: Lewis Allaire Scott

Personal details
- Born: 1730 New York City, New York, British America
- Died: September 14, 1784 (aged 53–54) New York City, New York, U.S.
- Children: Lewis Allaire Scott
- Education: Yale College
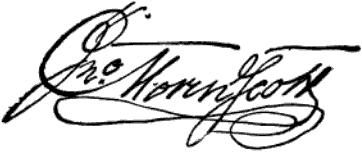
- Signature

Military service
- Allegiance: United States of America
- Years of service: 1775–1777
- Rank: Brigadier General
- Commands: 1st and 2nd New York Battalions; New York militia regiments
- Battles/wars: American Revolutionary War; Battle of Brooklyn; Battle of Harlem Heights; Battle of White Plains

John Morin Scott (1730 – September 14, 1784) was a lawyer, military officer, and statesman before, during and after the American Revolution.

== Early life ==
Coat of Arms of John Morin Scott

Scott was born in Manhattan, Province of New York in 1730. He was the only child of John Scott (1702–1733), a Manhattan merchant, and Marian (née Morin) Scott (1703–1755). His father died when he was only three years old, and his mother never remarried.

His father was the eldest of nine children born to Captain John Scott (1678–1740), who emigrated to New York City, where he received the rights of citizenship in 1702. His paternal grandfather was the second son of Sir John Scott, 1st Baronet of Ancrum, Roxburghshire in Scotland. His maternal grandfather was Huguenot settler, Pierre Morin.

He attended public school in New York before attending Yale College in New Haven, graduating in 1746 at the age of 16.

== Career ==
After graduation from Yale and further study, he was admitted to the New York bar association in 1752 and practiced law in Manhattan, where he also served as an alderman from 1756 to 1761. In 1752, along with William Livingston and William Smith, he founded a weekly journal, the Independent Reflector. From 1756 to 1761, he served as a New York alderman. In 1768, he was elected to membership in the American Philosophical Society.

=== American Revolution ===
Scott was a founding member of the Sons of Liberty, and in 1775, he was a member of the New York General Committee. Scott took part in the Broad Street Incident/Raid on June 6, 1755, in New York. During the Revolutionary War, John Scott was a member of the New York Provincial Congress (from 1775 to 1777), while also serving as a brigadier general under George Washington in the New York and New Jersey campaign. He commanded the 1st New York (Independent) Battalion, the 2nd New York (County) Battalion, and several New York Militia Regiments. He fought with Putnam's division at the Battle of Brooklyn on August 27, 1776, and was the last of Washington's generals to argue against surrendering Manhattan to the British—possibly due to his large landholdings there, including what is now Times Square and New York City's Theater District.

Twenty days later, on September 16, 1776, Scott led the same battalions and regiments at the Battle of Harlem Heights, an American victory. On October 28, 1776, his forces participated in the Battle of White Plains.

=== Post War life ===
In 1776, Scott was a member of the State of New York committee to author a state constitution. After the war, Scott regained his Manhattan estate and, in 1777, was a candidate for the first governorship of New York State, losing to George Clinton. Scott was elected Associate Justice of the State Supreme Court of New York in 1777, but declined.

Instead, he became the first Secretary of State of New York, a State Senator (representing the Southern District from 1777 to 1782), and served as an active delegate to the Continental Congress in 1780 and 1782.

== Personal life ==
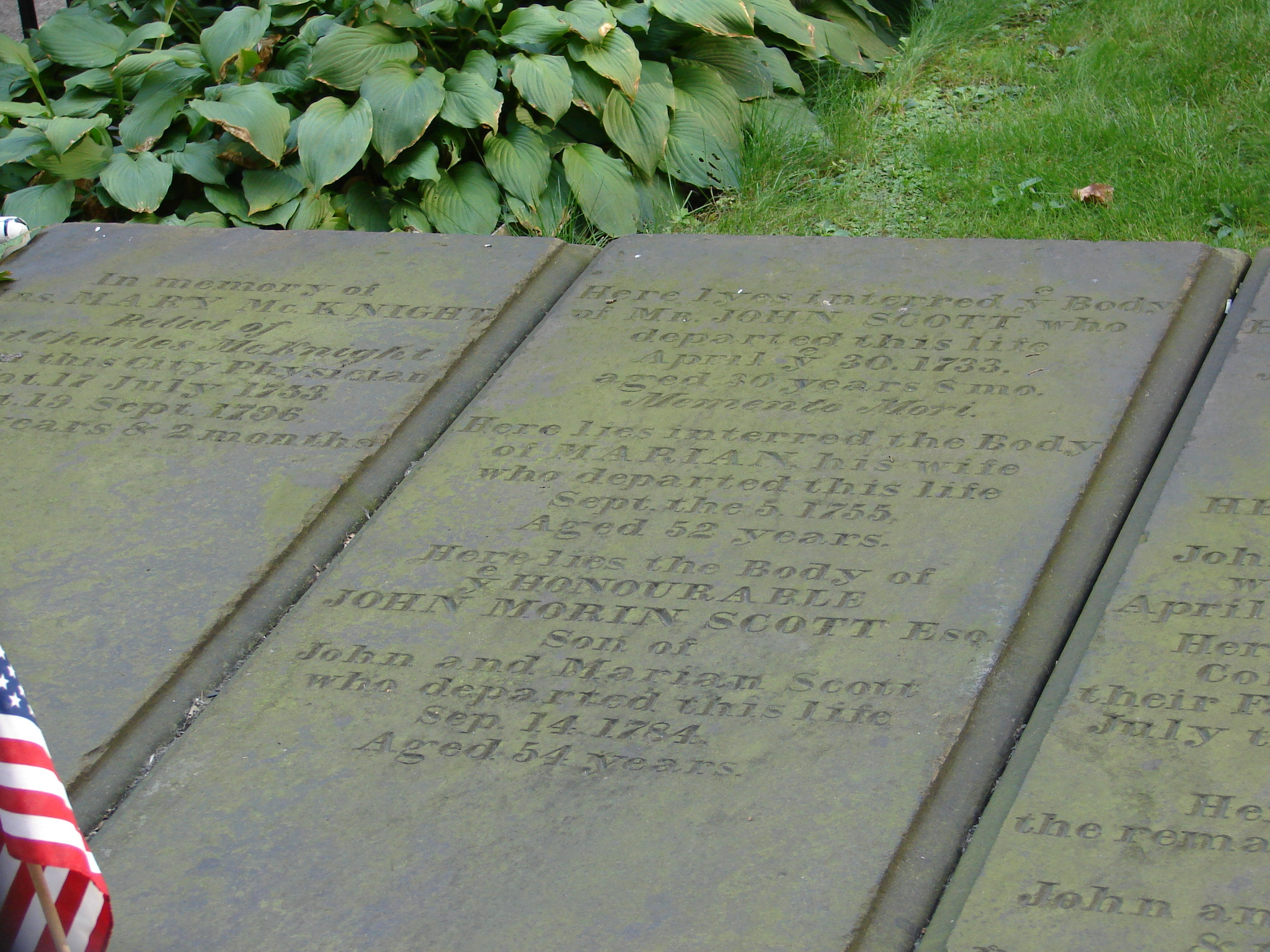
Scott's headstone

Scott was married to Helena Rutgers (1730–1798), a daughter of Petrus Rutgers and Helena (née Hooglant) Rutgers. Together, they were the parents of:

- Mary Morin Scott (1753–1796), who married John Litchfield in 1770. After his death in 1775, she married Charles McKnight (1750–1791) in 1778.
- Lewis Allaire Scott (1759–1798), who married Juliana Sitgreaves (1765–1842). Lewis was one of the two Deputy Secretaries of State during his father's tenure, and in 1784 was appointed to succeed him, dying in office in 1798.

Scott died in New York City on September 14, 1784, and his body was interred at the north entrance of Trinity Church, New York. His inscribed slab is visible from the corner of Wall Street and Broadway. An equestrian statue is erected in his honor in Upper Manhattan.

== See also ==
- Liberty Boys

Political offices
Preceded by none	Secretary of State of New York; 1778–1784	Succeeded by Lewis Allaire Scott
