= 1964 Philadelphia race riot =

Civil unrest in the African-American community

Coordinates: 39.98041°N 75.17087°W

- Part of Ghetto riots
- Date: August 28 - 30, 1964
- Location: North Philadelphia
- Caused by: Allegations of police brutality
- Methods: rioting, looting, arson

Parties
Black residents of North Philadelphia	Philadelphia Police Department

Casualties
- Injuries: 341
- Arrested: 774

The Philadelphia race riot, or Columbia Avenue Riot, took place in the predominantly black neighborhoods of North Philadelphia from August 28 to August 30, 1964. Tensions between black residents of the city and police had been escalating for several months over several well-publicized allegations of police brutality.

This riot was one of the first in the civil rights era and followed the 1964 Rochester race riot and Harlem riot of 1964 in New York City.

== Background ==
In 1964, North Philadelphia was the city's center of African-American culture, and home to 400,000 of the city's 600,000 black residents. The Philadelphia Police Department had tried to improve its relationship with the city's black community, assigning police to patrol black neighborhoods in teams of one black and one white officer per squad car and having a civilian review board to handle cases of police brutality.

Despite the improvement attempts of the Philadelphia Police Department, racial tensions had been high in Philadelphia over the issue of police brutality. The Philadelphia Tribune, the city’s black newspaper, ran several articles on police brutality which often resulted in white policemen being brought up on charges of brutality, only to be later acquitted. The summer of 1964 was at the peak of the civil rights movement with rioting breaking out in black areas of other northern cities including New York City; Rochester, N.Y.; Jersey City, N.J., and Elizabeth, N.J. stemming from allegations of police brutality against black residents.

== The riots ==
The unrest began on the evening of August 28 after a black woman named Odessa Bradford got into an argument with two police officers, one black, Robert Wells, and the other white, John Hoff, because Bradford stopped the car while arguing with her boyfriend and refused to move out of the intersection at 23rd Street and Columbia Avenue. The officers then tried to physically remove Bradford from the car. As the argument went on, a large crowd assembled in the area. A man tried to come to Bradford's aid by attacking the police officers at the scene, both he and Bradford were arrested.

Rumors then spread throughout North Philadelphia that a pregnant black woman had been beaten to death by white police officers. Later that evening, and throughout the next two days, angry mobs looted and burned mostly white-owned businesses in North Philadelphia, mainly along Columbia Avenue. Outnumbered, the police response was to withdraw from the area rather than aggressively confront the rioters.

Although no one was killed, 341 people were injured, 774 people were arrested and 225 stores were damaged or destroyed in the three days of rioting. Some of the tension was attributable to religion, with Black Muslims and black nationalists pitted against Black Baptist ministers who called for calm.

== Aftermath ==
The riot was reported to have caused $4,000,000 worth of damages, equivalent to $41,523,605 in 2025. Business activity in North Philadelphia declined even further after the riots, as many of the damaged or destroyed stores never re-opened for business. The riots also helped to facilitate the political rise to power of Frank Rizzo, who favored more punitive approaches to crime.

In 1987, Columbia Avenue between Front and 33rd Streets was renamed Cecil B. Moore Avenue after the influential and often controversial Civil Rights leader. Although his role was limited, Moore has been regarded as a pacifying figure who helped quell the rioting.

== Cultural references ==
A fictionalized version of the events of the Philadelphia riots of 1964 are depicted in the first season finale of the NBC television series American Dreams.

== See also ==
- Race riots in Philadelphia during the 1919 Red Summer
- George Floyd protests in Philadelphia
- Ethnic conflict
- 1964 in the United States
- Urban riots
- List of incidents of civil unrest in the United States
