= Lombard Street riot =

Racial riot in Philadelphia in 1842

Coordinates: 39°56′35″N 75°09′07″W

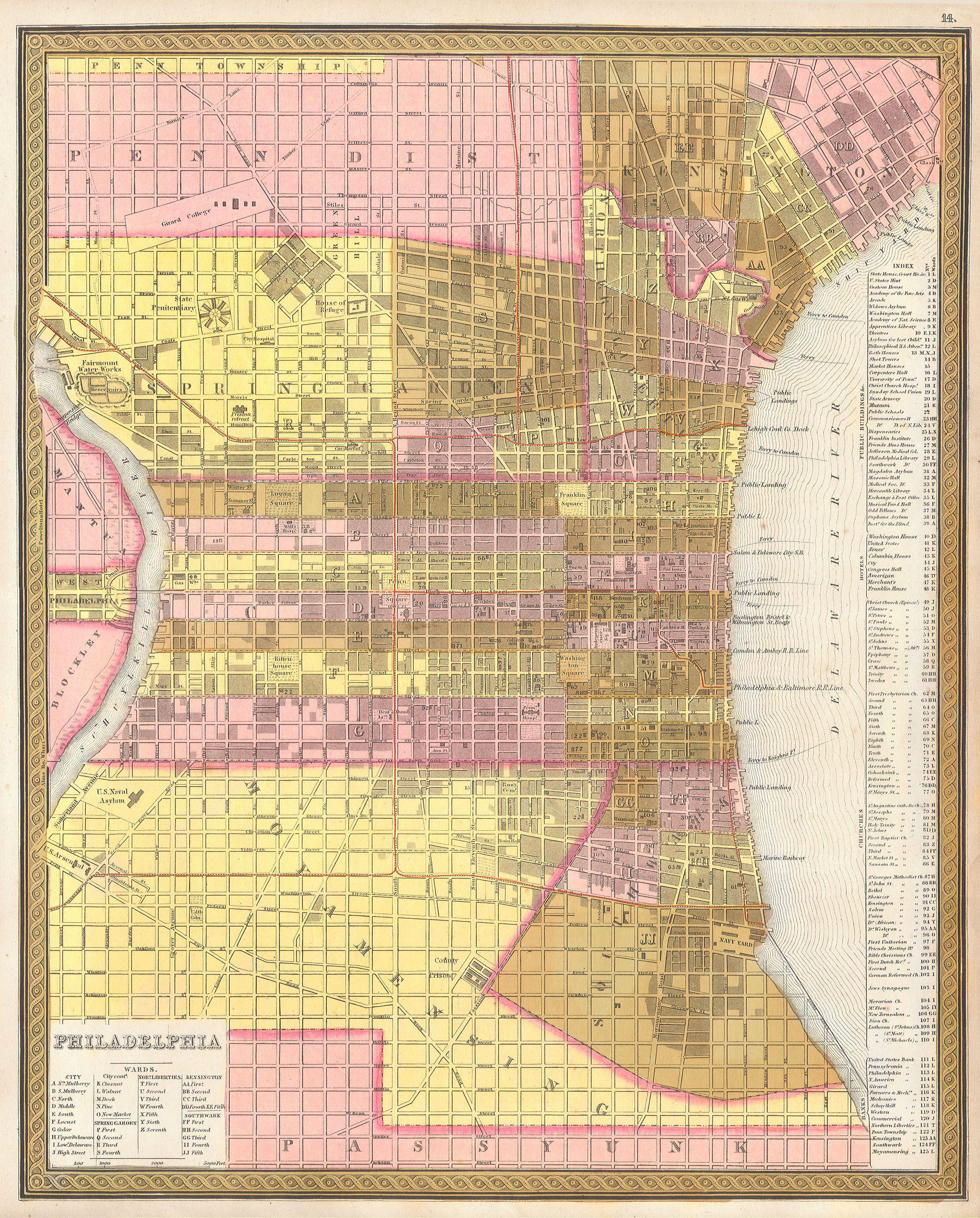
An 1846 map of Philadelphia

The Lombard Street riot was a racially motivated mob attack on the free Black community in Philadelphia, Pennsylvania, on August 1, 1842.

== Background ==
In 1842, the Black community of Philadelphia was concentrated in what is now known as the Washington Square and Society Hill areas of Philadelphia. At nearly 20,000 people this population was larger the whole population (Black and white) of Buffalo, New York.

Social, economic, religious and political stratification and diversity existed with this community. This included a large working class population organized into over 17 churches, hundreds of mutual aid societies, literary and intellectual groups, anti-slavery and emancipation support groups, economic associations, and over 23 public and private schools. Many churches had substantial public infrastructure; such as First African Presbyterian church which could hold 900 people. The wealthiest tier of this population included some of the wealthiest people in Philadelphia; like sailmaker James Forten.

Within close proximity to the Mason–Dixon line - which represented the dividing line between states whose economic foundation was the enslavement of Black people, and Pennsylvania where enslavement was illegal - the Black community of Philadelphia importantly served as a hub of emancipation and anti-slavery activities; and as a destination for people who had self-emancipated or leveraged Underground Railroad routes to gain their freedom.

== Possible causes ==
=== Success of the Black temperance movement ===
In the early 1840s, Black temperance organizations were active in Philadelphia. The idea to specifically target problems associated with alcohol addiction made an appearance in colored conventions of the early 1830s. By 1837, the American Moral Reform Society (AMRS) had formed in Philadelphia for the purpose of "sound morality, by the influence of ...temperance" and whose members had to comply with "total abstinence, from all intoxicating liquors." AMRS founding documents called for the creation of a physical location that would include a manual labor school. It seems that by 1842, a physical location had been established in Moyamensing on Bedford Street between 7th and 8th. Abolitionist Henry Clarke Wright describes ‘Temperance Hall’ on Bedford Street as "being in the midst of brothels, grog-shops, gambling hells, kept by whites and blacks -mainly whites". The small brick hall had successfully become "a comfortable little place in which to gather" with an attached sabbath school where meetings were held weekly.

In 1841 temperance leader Dr. James J.G. Bias had moved from his home at Acorn Alley to 8th and Bedford near Temperance Hall. This move may have been in response to his growing responsibilities in the temperance movement. In 1843 there were seven Black temperance societies in Philadelphia. Dr. Bias was the president of the largest group, the Moyamensing Benevolent Temperance Society of Philadelphia which claimed 1100 members in 1843. In 1842, Dr. Bias estimated that 450 rum sellers in Moyamensing experienced a 90% reduction in average daily receipts (from $5 a day to $.50 a day) due to the temperance movement.

=== Black wealth and social mobility ===
During the decade before the mob attack, Philadelphia experienced a boom in Irish immigrants, most of whom settled in close proximity to the Black population, in Southwark, Northern Liberties and Moyamensing. This population was socially and religiously diverse and experienced contests that spilled over into armed conflict during the Nativist riots. Middle and working class white people, both Irish immigrants and native born, participated in racist attacks targeting symbols of Black wealth; private homes, churches and halls in the 1834 and 1835 mob attacks. A detailed analysis of arrest records from 1834 found both middle-class and working class native-born white people among the attackers as well. Another study found that attacks were aimed at the destruction of Black-owned property, with attention paid to the homes of wealthy Black people, rather than injuries to Black male low-skilled workers.

Sociologist Bruce Laurie writes that during this period "Blacks came to monopolize several categories of unskilled work and that some Black workers, as the looting and destruction of the whites showed, earned good incomes and accumulated some worldly possessions." Historian Emma Lapsanksy-Werner says that job competition was only part of the issue. What must also be included as a cause of white racial attacks is Black social mobility. "Job competition and amalgamation were but portions of a larger issue, that of blacks' rising aspirations and designs for upward mobility that threatened to jostle the established social order."

== Parade organizers ==
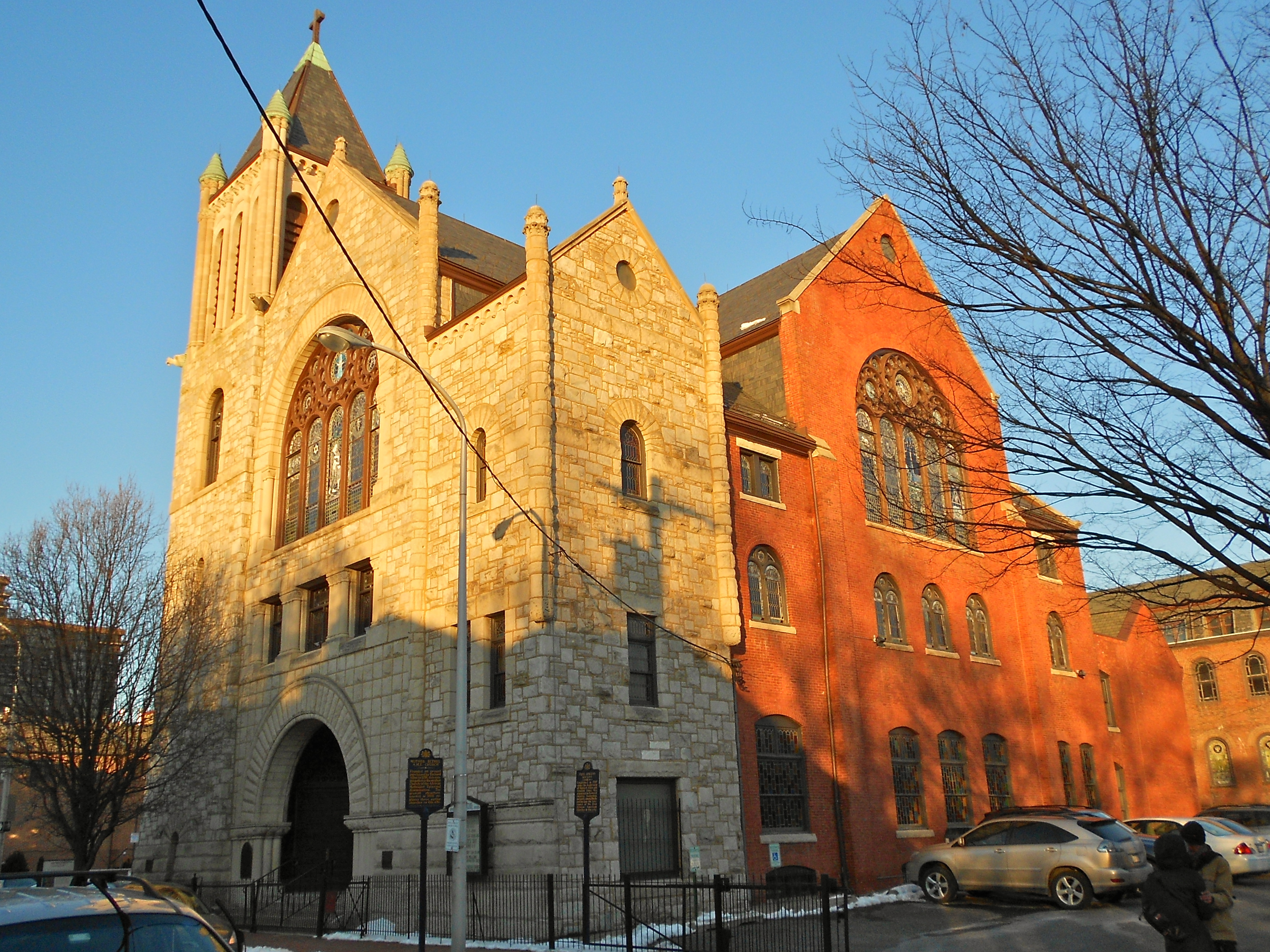
Mother Bethel A.M.E. Church

The Moyamensing Benevolent Temperance Society decided to hold a public celebration due to the success of their movement, which they hoped would encourage others to join.

August 1 was popularly known as ‘West Indian Emancipation Day” and represented the day when millions of enslaved people were emancipated within the British Empire. Black communities in the United States had already regularized this celebration and so it was felt that the parade should be held on Emancipation Day.

Other community groups were invited to participate. A July 9, 1842 letter to Jacob C. White Sr. from the Wesley Sabbath school appears to accept an invitation to participate in the march and to sing songs from a hymnal. It reads:

Wesley Sabbath School to Jacob C White Sr.

Mr. White,

Dear sir, the Lombard Street Sabbath School of the Wesley Church have unanimously decided to unite in the Celebration of the 1st of August, and with 150 copies of the hymns for the use of the schools, you will please inform us of the arrangement for drilling the schools in singing. I am yours very respectfully,

Mrs. Levick

In this broadside for the event, Sunday schools, which would have had populations of children and their families, took place in a pre-parade ceremony.

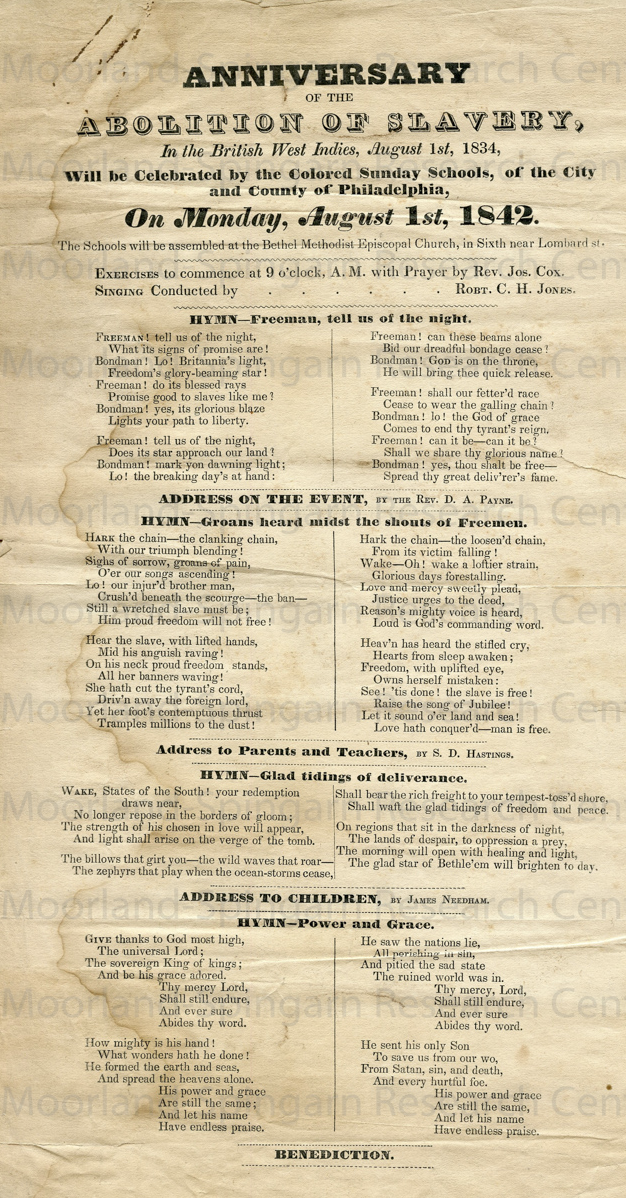
Courtesy Howard University."Anniversary of the Abolition of Slavery" (2018). Circulars, Pamphlets, Programs, Invitations, Flyers, Newsletters, Playbill & Broadsides. 8. https://dh.howard.edu/og_circulars/8

The Young Men’s Vigilant Association also participated. Because of the banners that prominently displayed their name, they were incorrectly assumed to be the organizers of the parade.

== Planning ==
A few weeks before August 1842, a Chester County newspaper reported that “a black woman..expressed a desire to visit the city, but said she was afraid. Her fear was founded upon the fact, that the blacks were threatened to be mobbed.” 'Justice', a commentator in the Liberator, reported that a group of miners had some semblance of a strike in Pottsville over wages and that those same miners were noted to be in Philadelphia on August 1 “actively engaged in the riot.” He received information that a group of Irishmen were "known to be...making clubs of hickory, bark at one end, and the other whittled and painted black" the weekend before August 1.

On the morning of August 1, a Monday, carpenters working on Beneficial Hall, a hall build by wealthy Black leader Stephen Smith at the corner of 7th and Lombard, were observed removing all their tools from the hall in the morning.

Black leaders Robert Purvis, Rev. Charles Gardner and Bishop Daniel Payne wrote in the days after that "From various information received, there is strong reason to believe that plots had been laid, preparations made and cudgels obtained for the purpose of breaking up the procession, if not further violence, before the arrival of the day on which it was to take place."

On the day of the attack, multiple sources say that Mayor John Scott was told in the morning that an attack on the Black community, specifically that arson at Beneficial Hall, was planned. For example, the National Anti-Slavery Standard wrote that "the rioters threatened all the day of Monday to burn the Hall at night."

== Attack ==
1,200 parade marchers, including school groups of children, gathered in the morning at Temperance Hall on Bedford Street. At the rear of the march, which must have stretched several blocks, was the Young Men’s Vigilant Association. They carried two banners designed by Black artist Robert Douglass Junior. One banner was described thusly by the National Anti-Slavery Standard; "In honor of the anniversary of West Indian Emancipation, [the banner] bore the figure of a colored man, pointing with one hand to the broken chains at his feet, and with the other to word LIBERTY, in gilded letters, over his head. In the background, was a rising sun, and a sinking slave ship. The reverse bore this inscription: THE YOUNG MEN’S VIGILANT ASSOCIATION OF PHILADELPHIA. How grand in age, how fair in youth, Are holy friendship, love and truth Instituted July 23, 1841."

The march proceeded as follows.

Temperance Hall - Bedford Street

- Up 8th to Lombard
- Lombard to 10th
- 10th to Carpenter
- Carpenter to 4th
- 4th to Shippen (Bainbridge)

Newspapers agree that near the corner of 4th and Shippen (now Bainbridge), white young men started to harass the marchers. This quickly grew into an attack. The Anti-Slavery Standard reports that "brick- bats, clubs and missiles of every description were thrown at each other". Black people fought back. The parade stopped. The banners were torn down and sent to the mayor’s office where he publicly displayed them.

Up 6th to the corner of 6th and Lombard, the white mob proceeded to beat Black people indiscriminately and to destroy homes, smashing windows with bricks, pulling down shutters, destroying doors, and tearing down walls. They entered a court next to Big Wesley church and destroyed 4 homes.

At about 4:00 pm, some of the white mob went south, back into Moyamensing and Bedford Street. They destroyed a house at South and Hirst. They appeared to enter 8th and Bedford with the intention to attack certain houses. "They entered Bedford street, where all halted before some small frame houses, and shower upon shower of destructive missiles were hurled at them; the attention of the mob was then directed to a one-story meeting-house or school-room in the rear, the doors and windows of which were soon demolished; just at this moment, and when we were standing directly opposite the meeting house, a blackdischarged a loaded gun from one of the windows at the crowd, but did no damage...the mob..succeeded in wrestling from him the gun, and also an old sword and securing him prisoner."

Dr. James J.G. Bias lived at 8th and Bedford at this time and Temperance Hall was also at 8th and Bedford. The mob may have known both the location of Dr. Bias’ house and Temperance Hall. The "meeting house or school-room" may have been the school room for the Temperance Hall Sabbath School described by Henry C. Wright.

Another group of mobsters stayed near St. Mary and 7th. When they got to Bradford Alley they were met with gunfire from a house. Three Black people, a teenager named Henry Van Brackle, a man named Anthony Harvey and a third Black man were fighting back and three white men were hit by gunfire. As that was happening, the mob was growing in numbers and threats. One estimate was that 3000 white people were attacking Black people and destroying Black-owned property.

At about 6:15 pm, a white man broke into the back door of a home on Lombard between 7th and 8th. Old and young people were dragged out and beaten.

Robert Purvis' home was at 8th and Lombard. He had been at an anti-slavery meeting in Norristown earlier in the day. He came home to find his home under attack. With his wife and children upstairs, "Purvis took a seat on the stairs, with his rifle across his knees; Purvis was prepared to kill anyone who attacked his family."

== Burning of Beneficial Hall and Second African Presbyterian Church ==
A large crowd had gathered at 7th and Lombard outside of Beneficial Hall, anticipating its destruction. The sheriff, Judge Todd, and two fire engineers were on the ground as well. At about 8:15 pm a group of white men approached the hall and were blocked by the Sheriff, Judge Todd, and the sheriff's men. When they stood in front of the hall the stoning stopped temporarily.The master builder of the hall stepped on a box and tried to reason with the mobsters that the hall was meant for meetings, not abolition. The mob yelled. Then Judge Todd got on the box. The mob yelled. Then the sheriff tried to reason with the mob. No police appeared.

At 9:00 pm someone set the building on fire. The fire grew quickly causing one reporter to say that they had never seen “so great destruction in so little time”. Within 20 minutes the sides fell. And then the front fell. The sides crashed into the adjoining houses.

After this destruction, 200 special police appeared.

At about 10:30 PM, Second African Presbyterian church was on fire. The fire engines refused to throw water on either building. This was reported by all reporters on the ground. Here is the Brooklyn Evening Star: "The fire engines, though on the spot, refused to throw water on the flames.” Here is the Chester County Gazette: "On neither of these buildings did the fireman throw any water; but their efforts and success in saving the surrounding tenements were as great as is usually the care."

== Tuesday, August 2, 1842 ==
Early on Tuesday, near the Schuylkill wharf, white mobsters returned with weapons. Two Black men were beaten. "Groups of men began to assemble..with shillelahs and clubs. Two black men happened to show their heads, and the mob at once rushed upon them, whooping like savages".

The mob grew into a crowd of 600. The sheriff arrived with 60 men who were unable to control a mob that large and wound up running away, with the mob in pursuit. "They were soon put to flight, and compelled to run in all directions, to save their lives; the mob pursuing them hotly".

The mob attacked "every colored man, woman and child they could get sight of". A Black man armed with a scythe for self-protection was chased but escaped near Schuylkill and Walnut. An elderly Black man named Issac Reed, who was sawing wood at 10th and Fitzwater, was attacked by the mob and beaten. Somehow he made it to the hospital. The white mob chased the sheriff’s men across Rittenhouse Square to 17th and Spruce then to 17th and Pine. They then ran to 20th and Pine where they saw a Black man. This Black man was able to lock himself in a house and the mob was unable to break in.

The Sheriff called for help from the military and by the afternoon, arrests started to happen. Expecting another attack by a mob that had now grown to nearly 1000, the police were armed with maces and stationed near a square having two churches where additional attacks were expected. Some attacks by labor groups also occurred. At the wharves, white coal heavers began to attack Black men. "The coal heavers and others on the wharves of the Schuylkill river quitted their work, and made an attack upon several colored men, one of who was cut and bruised". Two fire companies broke through the police lines nearly causing a riot "which probably was the object of running through".

== August 3, 1842 ==
At some point during the day, someone attempted to set fire to Stephen Smith’s Lumber Yard in Columbia, Pennsylvania. The City opened a Grand Inquest on Temperance Hall and deemed it a nuisance.

A few days later, a fully functioning community center that was having a positive impact on the community, Temperance Hall, was torn down. The Liberator and the Anti-Slavery Standard called out this injustice and blamed the rum sellers and corrupt city officials.

== Aftermath ==
By the end of the day on August 2, 1842, Stephen Smith sued the City and County of Philadelphia for the destruction of his hall using the Pennsylvania Riot Law which had been created in the aftermath of the burning of Pennsylvania Hall. Later, the Second African Presbyterian church also sued under the same law. This law was introduced the day after Pennsylvania Hall was burned down, on May 18, 1838. The law says that if any property is destroyed from mob violence, the public must compensate those who have lost property.

Both Stephen Smith and Second African Presbyterian Church won their court cases. Remarkably, a year after Second African Presbyterian Church went down, a new church was built.

Stephen Smith located the Home for the Colored Aged and Inform on the lots that were previously Beneficial Hall.

Afterward, Mayor John Morin Scott refused to arrest most of those known to have led the riot. Of those arrested by the militia, most were found not guilty or otherwise released. The three or four who were convicted received only light sentences.

== Injured ==
Approximately 20 people were taken to Pennsylvania Hospital. Pennsylvania Hospital reported these admittances as “injured by a mob”.

== Historical marker ==
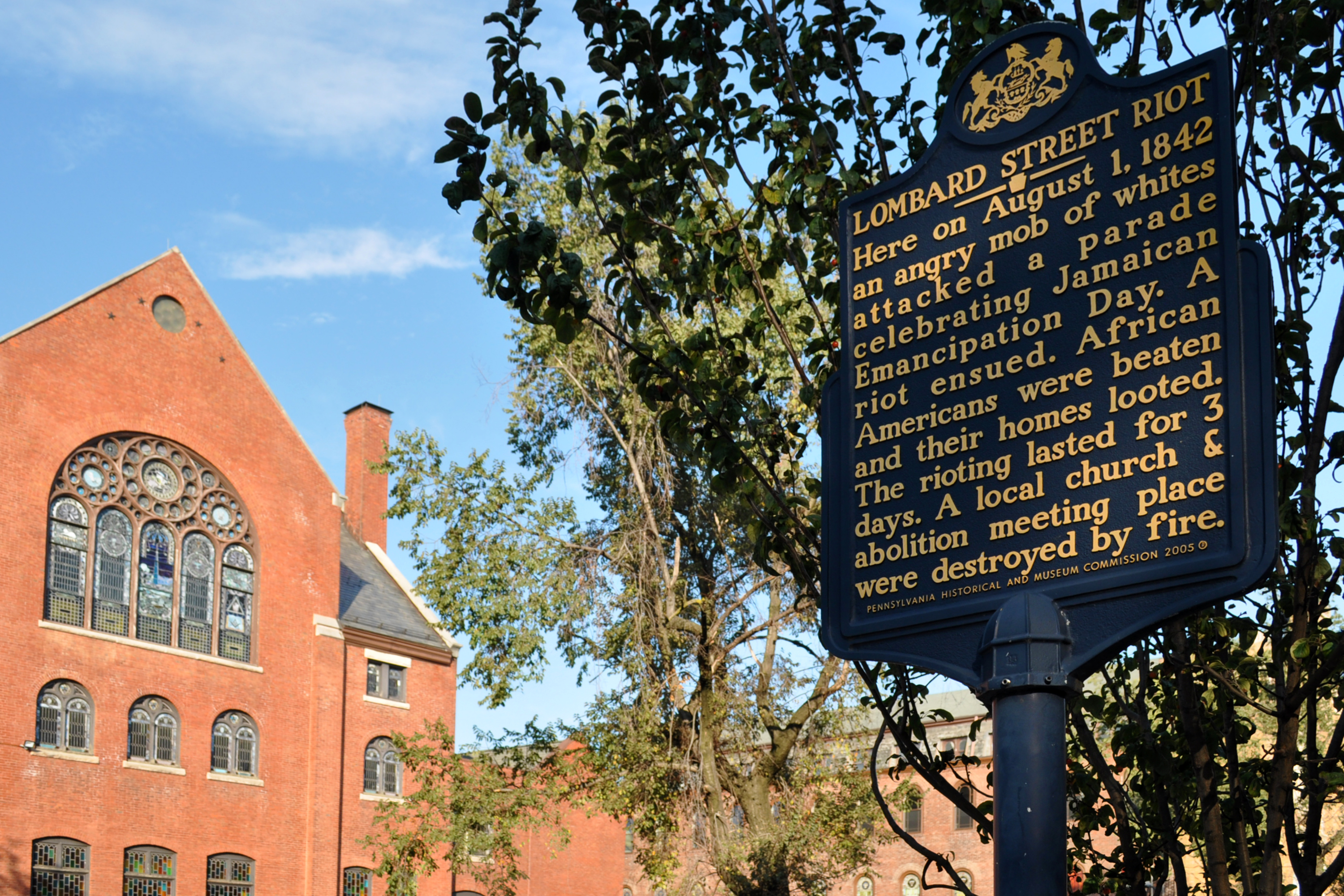
Lombard Street Riot Historical Marker at 6th and Lombard Sts. Philadelphia PA

In March 2005, the Pennsylvania Historical and Museum Commission approved a historical sign at Sixth and Lombard streets to mark the event.

It reads:

Lombard Street Riot — Here on August 1, 1842 an angry mob of whites attacked a parade celebrating Jamaican Emancipation Day. A riot ensued. African Americans were beaten and their homes looted. The rioting lasted for 3 days. A local church and abolition meeting place were destroyed by fire.

The marker was the result of work by a class of Philadelphia students challenged by their history teacher to research a race riot in the city and argue for its significance. After researching the riot, the students decided that the event was an aspect of a significant part of the city's history that is often ignored. Petitioning for the marker was their way of highlighting the racial intolerance often left out of versions of city history presented to tourists.

The marker stands at Philadelphia's first public recreation facility, Starr Garden, which is a popular playground.

== See also ==
- List of incidents of civil unrest in the United States
- Philadelphia Nativist Riots
- History of African-Americans in Philadelphia
