= Peter McCall (mayor) =

American lawyer and politician

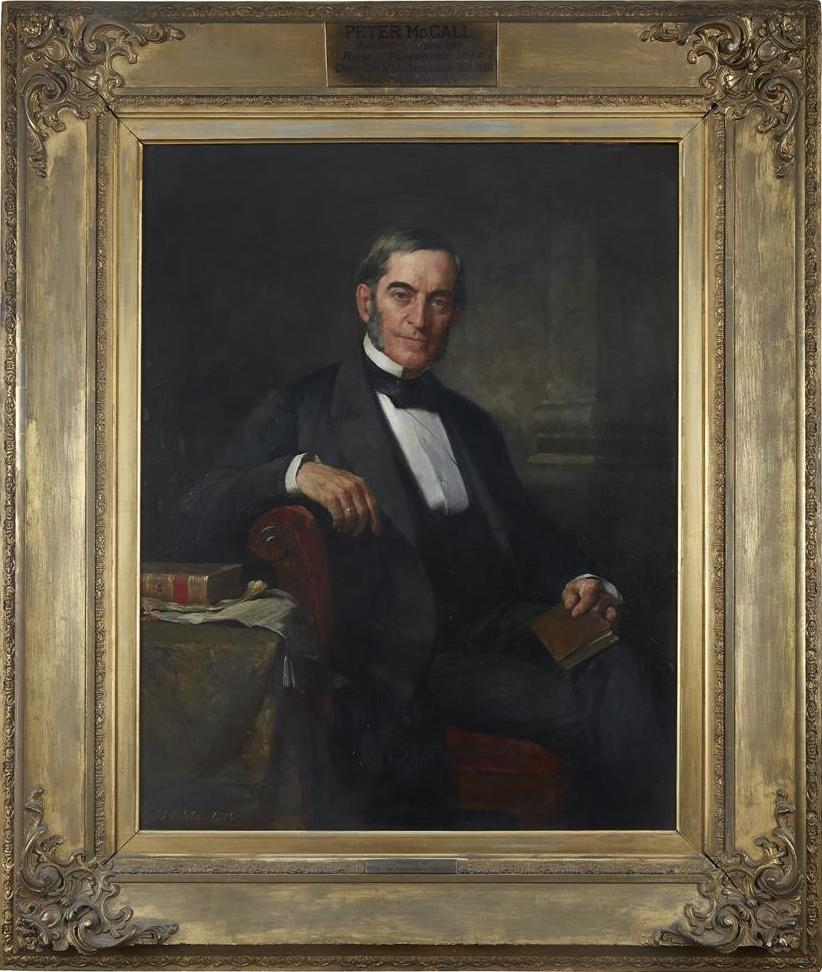
- Born: 31 August 1809
- Died: 30 October 1880 (aged 71)
- Alma mater: Princeton University
- Occupation: Lawyer, politician
- Political party: Whig Party
- Position held: Mayor of Philadelphia

Peter McCall (August 31, 1809 – October 30, 1880) was an American lawyer and politician. He served as Mayor of Philadelphia from 1844 to 1845.

== Biography ==
McCall attended Princeton University, from which he graduated in 1826. He was admitted to the bar in 1830, and practiced law in Philadelphia until shortly before his death in 1880.

He was a professor in the University of Pennsylvania Law School from 1852 to 1860. He later served as a University Trustee. He was also a founder of the Law Academy of Philadelphia, the first professional legal association in the United States.

He served as a member of the Philadelphia City Council for several terms throughout the 1840s and 1850s.

In 1846, he married Jane Byrd Mercer (1825– 1895), with whom he had eight children.

In 1851, he was elected as a member to the American Philosophical Society.

== Sources ==
- Phillips, Henry (January 7, 1881). "Obituary Notice of Peter McCall". Proceedings of the American Philosophical Society. 9 (108): 213–215. JSTOR 982242.

Preceded by John Morin Scott	Mayor of Philadelphia; 1844–1845	Succeeded by John Swift
