= Joel Jones (mayor) =

American politician

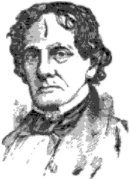
- Born: October 26, 1795; Coventry, Connecticut
- Died: February 3, 1860 (aged 64); Philadelphia, Pennsylvania
- Education: Yale University; Law School in Litchfield, Connecticut
- Occupations: Lawyer, judge, and mayor of Philadelphia

Joel Jones (October 26, 1795 – February 3, 1860) was an American lawyer, jurist, and mayor of Philadelphia.

== Biography ==
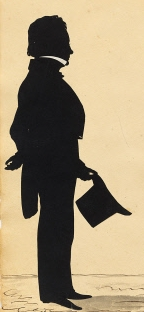
Auguste Edouart, Judge Joel Jones, 1842

He was born in Coventry, Connecticut, the oldest of nine children. At age fifteen he went to Hebron, Connecticut, and engaged in business with his uncle. After graduating from Yale University with high honor in 1817, he commenced the study of law with Judge William Bristol of New Haven, Connecticut, and afterward finished at Tapping Reeve's Litchfield Law School in Litchfield, Connecticut. After completion of his studies, he resided for a short time in Wilkes-Barre, Pennsylvania, whence he removed, in 1822, to Easton, Pennsylvania, where he practiced law for many years. From 1826 to 1835 he served as a secretary to the Lafayette College board of trustees, and continued to work as a trustee until 1852. In 1830 he was appointed by Governor George Wolf one of three commissioners to revise the civil code of Pennsylvania.

In 1834 he removed to Philadelphia, where he became associate judge in 1835, and afterward presiding judge of the Philadelphia district court. He was the first president of Girard College in 1847–1849. In 1849 he was elected mayor of Philadelphia. He took an active interest in theological speculations and inquiries, and was an earnest advocate of a literal interpretation of those scriptures which predict the second coming of Christ. He also edited several English works on prophecy.

On June 14, 1831, he married Eliza P. Sparhawk in Philadelphia, with whom he had six children. One of the sons was Rev. John Sparhawk Jones, whose daughter Elizabeth Sparhawk-Jones was an artist.

In 1848, Jones was elected to the American Philosophical Society.

Joel Jones died in Philadelphia on February 3, 1860.

== Works ==
- Pennsylvania. Commissioners Appointed to Revise the Civil Code; Thomas Isaac Wharton; Joel Jones, Pennsylvania. General Assembly. Senate, Crabb & Barrett (1835). Report of the Commissioners Appointed to Revise the Civil Code of Pennsylvania,: Read in Senate, Jan. 15, 1836. Crabb & Barrett.
- A Manual of Pennsylvania Land Law
- Joel Jones (1861). Notes on Scripture. Martien.
- Outlines of a History of the Court of Rome, and of the Temporal Power of the Popes, translated from the French, with original notes

Political offices
Preceded by John Swift	Mayor of Philadelphia; 1849–1851	Succeeded by Charles Gilpin
