= Samuel Badger =

American politician

Samuel Badger (December 6, 1786 – March 14, 1866) was an American politician.

Badger was born in Windham, Connecticut, December 6, 1786. He graduated from Yale College in 1805. He read law in the office of Jared Ingersoll, Esq., of Philadelphia, and was admitted to the bar in 1809. Notwithstanding his youth, he received in 1814, from Governor Simon Snyder, the appointment of Associate Judge of the Court of Common Pleas. He retained this office but little more than a year, accepting from the same Governor the office of Alderman, which he held for twenty-five years. Badger was a member of the Episcopal Church and a Freemason. He was grand master of the Grand Lodge of Pennsylvania from 1829 to 1830. He died in Philadelphia, March 14, 1866, aged 79 years. He left a widow.
