= 1839 Philadelphia mayoral election =

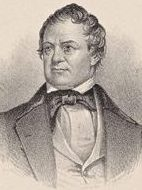

Nominee	John Swift	John K. Kane	John C. Montgomery
General election vote	3,343	3,294	2,670
General election percentage	35.92%	35.39%	28.69%
City Council vote	26	0
City Council percentage	100%	0.00%
Mayor before election
Isaac Roach
Elected mayor
John Swift
Whig

The 1839 Philadelphia mayoral election saw John Swift return to office for a seventh overall non-consecutive term.

This was the first Philadelphia mayoral election in which members of the general public were able to vote. Prior to this, the City Council solely elected mayors of Philadelphia. Beginning in 1839, the city began to operate under a mixed electoral system. Citizens voted for mayor in a general election. If a candidate received a majority of the vote, they would be elected mayor. However, if no candidate received a majority, the City Council would select a mayor from the top-two finishers.

== Results ==
=== General election ===
1839 Philadelphia mayoral election results (general election)
Candidate	Votes	%
John Swift	3,343	35.92%
John K. Kane	3,294	35.39%
John C. Montgomery	2,670	28.69%
Total votes	9,307	

=== City Council (runoff) ===
1839 Philadelphia mayoral election results (City Council runoff)
Candidate	Votes	%
John Swift	26	100%
John K. Kane	0	0.00%
Total votes	26	
