= John Swift (politician) =

American politician

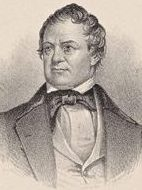
Portrait of Swift

John Swift (27 June 1790 – 9 June 1873) was an American lawyer and politician who served as a long-time mayor of Philadelphia. He was born in and died in Philadelphia. He was admitted to the bar in 1810. He was a leader of the Whigs of Philadelphia and served as mayor in several non-consecutive terms: 1832–1838, 1839–1841, and 1845–1849. In 1840, Swift became the first mayor to be elected by popular election. He is buried at Christ Church Burial Ground in Philadelphia.

== Personal life ==
John Swift was born in Philadelphia on January 21, 1790. His father, Charles Swift, was one of the founders of the Pennsylvania Academy of the Fine Arts. Swift graduated from University of Pennsylvania in 1808 with a Bachelor of Arts Degree. Swift married Mary Truxton, daughter of Commodore Thomas Truxton, on March 11, 1808. He was admitted to the Pennsylvania Bar five days later, on March 16, 1811.

Swift was elected a member of the State in Schuylkill, otherwise known as the Schuylkill Fishing Company, on October 2, 1822. His name appears first in the charter granted by the commonwealth to the State in the Schuylkill on April 27, 1838.

== Military career ==
Swift served as the Captain of the second company of the Washington Guards during the War of 1812. Post-war Swift became a Colonel.

== Mayor of Philadelphia ==
Swift served 12 years as a Mayor of Philadelphia over three terms. Swift was in office during the 1834 Philadelphia race riot. Swift won the first Philadelphia Mayoral election with popular vote on October 15, 1839. The following year, on October 20, 1840, Swift won the first Philadelphia Mayoral election purely decided by popular vote.

Political offices
Preceded by Benjamin Wood Richards	Mayor of Philadelphia; 1832–1838	Succeeded by Isaac Roach
Preceded by Isaac Roach	Mayor of Philadelphia; 1839–1841	Succeeded by John Morin Scott
Preceded by Peter McCall	Mayor of Philadelphia; 1845–1849	Succeeded by Joel Jones
