= 1846 in the United States =

- Decades: 1820s; 1830s; 1840s; 1850s; 1860s
- See also: History of the United States (1789–1849); Timeline of United States history (1820–1859); List of years in the United States

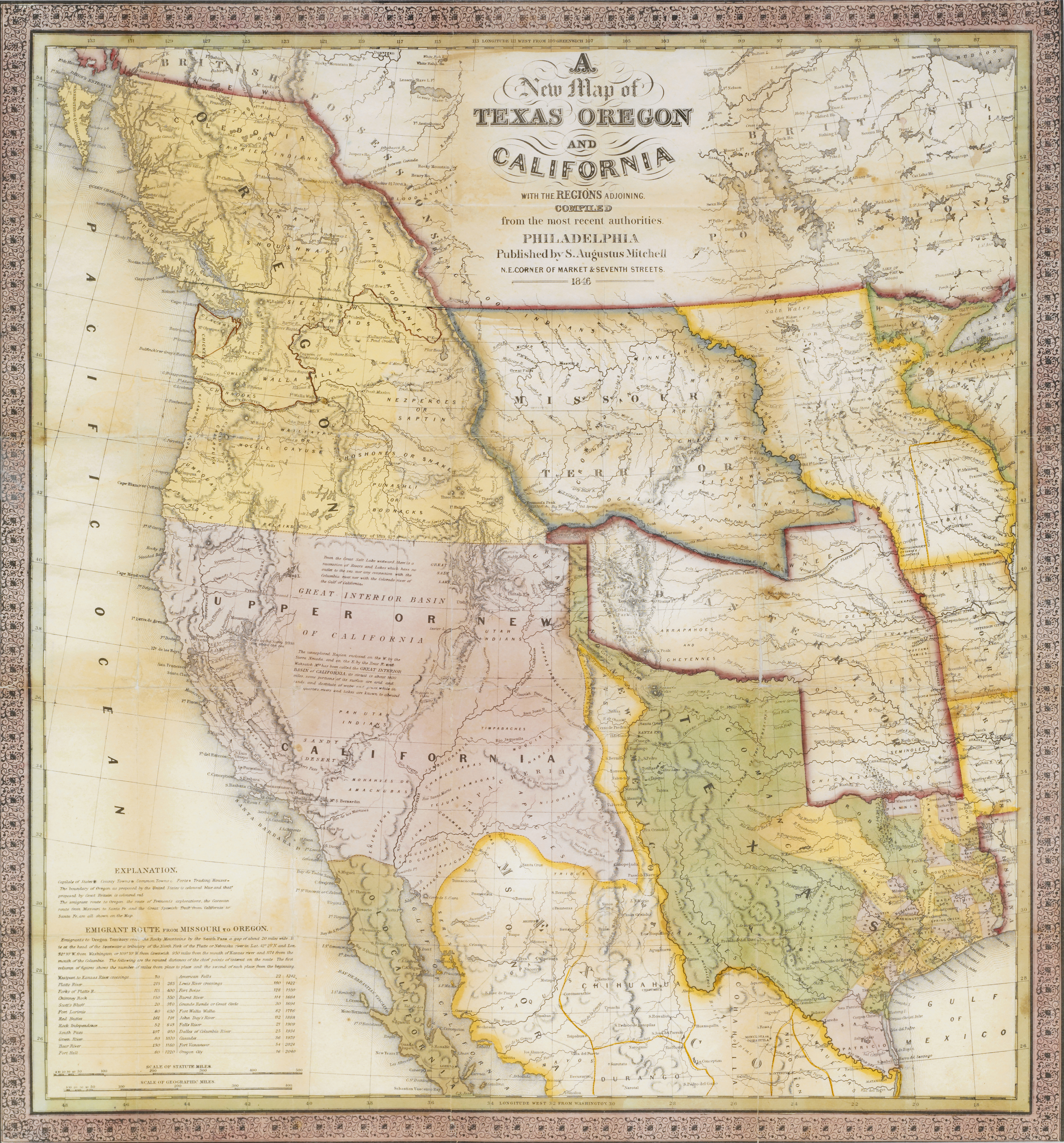
Map of Texas, Oregon, and California in 1846

Events from the year 1846 in the United States. In this year, the United States declares war on Mexico, starting the Mexican–American War.

== Incumbents ==
=== Federal government ===
- President: James K. Polk (D-Tennessee)
- Vice President: George M. Dallas (D-Pennsylvania)
- Chief Justice: Roger B. Taney (Maryland)
- Speaker of the House of Representatives: John Wesley Davis (D-Indiana)
- Congress: 29th

==== State governments ====
Governors and lieutenant governors

=== Governors ===
- Governor of Alabama: Joshua L. Martin (Independent)
- Governor of Arkansas: Thomas Stevenson Drew (Democratic)
- Governor of Connecticut: Roger Sherman Baldwin (Whig) (until May 6), Isaac Toucey (Democratic) (starting May 6)
- Governor of Delaware:
  - until March 2: Thomas Stockton (Whig)
  - March 2-May 3: Joseph Maull (Whig)
  - May 3-6: vacant
  - starting May 6: William Temple (Whig)
- Governor of Florida: William Dunn Moseley (Democratic)
- Governor of Georgia: George W. Crawford (Whig)
- Governor of Illinois: Thomas Ford (Democratic) (until December 9), Augustus C. French (Democratic) (starting December 9)
- Governor of Indiana: James Whitcomb (Democratic)
- Governor of Iowa: James Clarke (political party unknown) (until December 28), Ansel Briggs (Democratic) (starting December 28)
- Governor of Kentucky: William Owsley (Whig)
- Governor of Louisiana: Alexandre Mouton (Democratic) (until February 12), Isaac Johnson (Democratic) (starting February 12)
- Governor of Maine: Hugh J. Anderson (Democratic)
- Governor of Maryland: Thomas Pratt (Democratic)
- Governor of Massachusetts: George N. Briggs (Democratic)
- Governor of Michigan: John S. Barry (Democratic) (until January 5), Alpheus Felch (Democratic) (starting January 5)
- Governor of Mississippi: Albert G. Brown (Democratic)
- Governor of Missouri: John C. Edwards (Democratic)
- Governor of New Hampshire: John H. Steele (Democratic) (until June 4), Anthony Colby (Whig) (starting June 4)
- Governor of New Jersey: Charles C. Stratton (Whig)
- Governor of New York: Silas Wright (Democratic) (until end of December 31)
- Governor of North Carolina: William Alexander Graham (Whig)
- Governor of Ohio: Mordecai Bartley (Democratic) (until December 12), William Bebb (Whig) (starting December 12)
- Governor of Pennsylvania: Francis R. Shunk (Democratic)
- Governor of Rhode Island: Charles Jackson (Know Nothing) (until May 6), Byron Diman (Law and Order) (starting May 6)
- Governor of South Carolina: William Aiken, Jr. (Democratic) (until December 8), David Johnson (Democratic) (starting December 8)
- Governor of Tennessee: Aaron V. Brown (Democratic)
- Governor of Texas: Anson Jones (political party unknown) (until February 19), James Pinckney Henderson (Democratic) (starting February 19)
- Governor of Vermont: William Slade (Whig) (until October 9), Horace Eaton (Whig) (starting October 9)
- Governor of Virginia: James McDowell (Democratic) (until January 1), William Smith (Democratic) (starting January 1)

=== Lieutenant governors ===
- Lieutenant Governor of Connecticut: Reuben Booth (Whig) (until May 6), Noyes Billings (Democratic) (starting May 6)
- Lieutenant Governor of Illinois: John Moore (Democratic) (until December 9), Joseph Wells (Democratic) (starting December 9)
- Lieutenant Governor of Indiana: vacant (until December 9), Paris C. Dunning (Democratic) (starting December 9)
- Lieutenant Governor of Kentucky: Archibald Dixon (Whig)
- Lieutenant Governor of Louisiana: Trasimond Landry (Whig) (starting month and day unknown)
- Lieutenant Governor of Massachusetts: John Reed, Jr. (political party unknown)
- Lieutenant Governor of Michigan: Origen D. Richardson (Whig) (until month and day unknown), William L. Greenly (Democratic) (starting month and day unknown)
- Lieutenant Governor of Missouri: James Young (Democratic)
- Lieutenant Governor of New York: Addison Gardiner (Democratic)
- Lieutenant Governor of Rhode Island: Byron Diman (political party unknown) (until May 6), Elisha Harris (Whig) (starting May 6)
- Lieutenant Governor of South Carolina: John Fulton Ervin (Democratic) (until December 8), William Cain (Democratic Party) (starting December 8)
- Lieutenant Governor of Texas: Albert Clinton Horton (Democratic) (starting February 19)
- Lieutenant Governor of Vermont: Horace Eaton (Whig) (until October 9), Leonard Sargeant (Whig) (starting October 9)

== Events ==
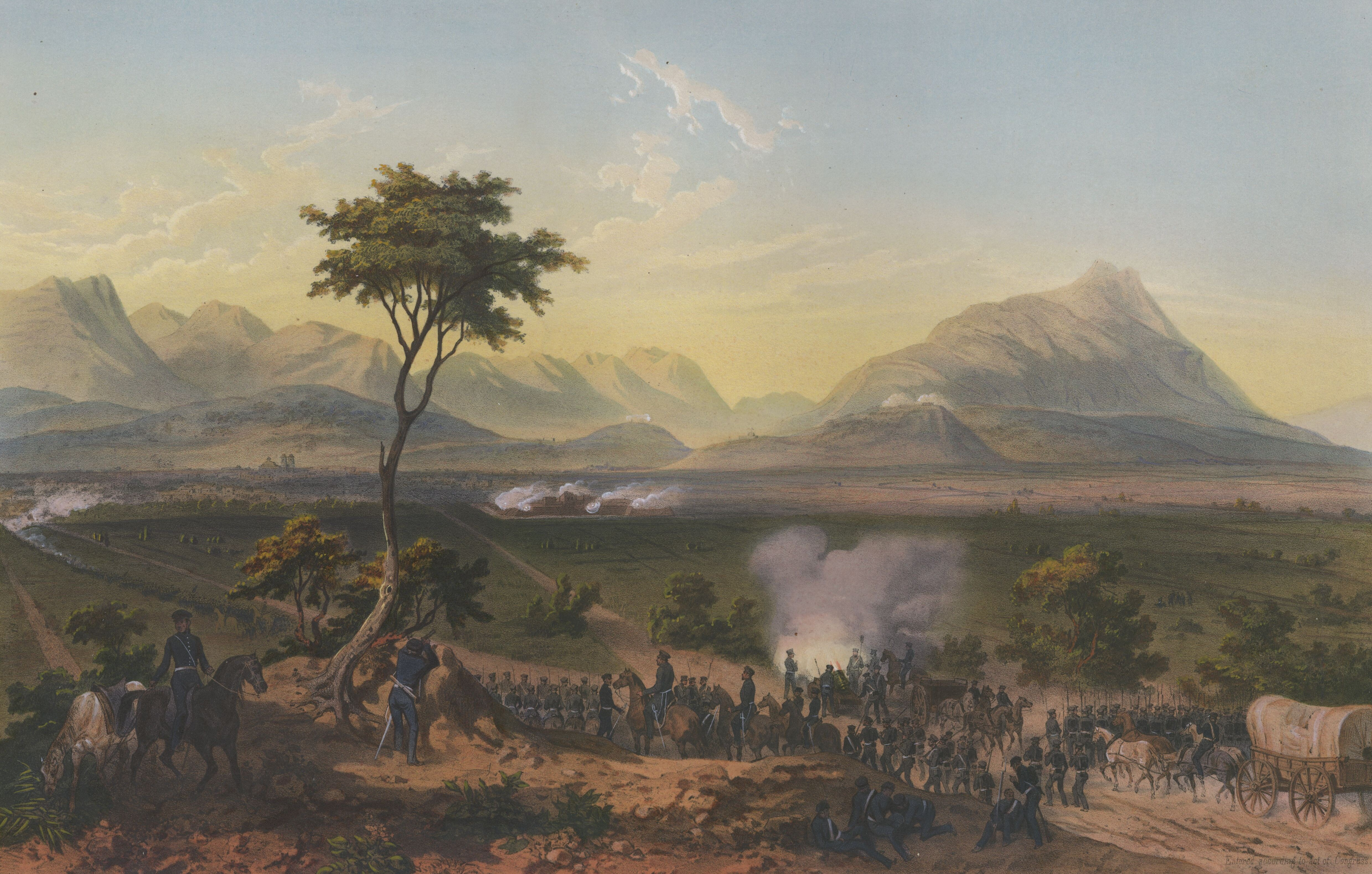
September 21–24: Battle of Monterrey (Mexican–American War).

- January 4 – The United States House of Representatives votes to stop sharing the Oregon Territory with the United Kingdom.
- January 30 – The City of Milwaukee is incorporated in Wisconsin, merging Juneautown, Kilbourntown and Walker's Point following the Milwaukee Bridge War of 1845. Solomon Juneau is elected first mayor.
- February 11 – Many Mormons begin their migration west from Nauvoo, Illinois to the Great Salt Lake, led by Brigham Young.
- February 18 – In Austin, Texas, the newly formed Texas state government is officially installed.
- February 27 – The Liberty Bell is cracked while being rung for George Washington's birthday.
- April 26 – Mexican–American War: Open conflict begins over border disputes of Texas' boundaries.
- May 8 – Mexican–American War – Battle of Palo Alto: Zachary Taylor defeats a Mexican force north of the Rio Grande at Palo Alto, Texas in the first major battle of the war.
- May 14 – Mexican–American War: The United States declares war on Mexico.
- May 23 – The Associated Press is founded in New York City.
- June 14 – Mexican–American War: The California Republic declares independence from Mexico.
- June 15 – Bear Flag Revolt: American settlers in Sonoma, California start a rebellion against Mexico and proclaim the California Republic.
- June 16 – The Oregon Treaty establishes the 49th parallel as the border between the United States and Canada, from the Rocky Mountains to the Strait of Juan de Fuca.
- June 20 – The first officially recorded baseball game using modern rules developed by Alexander Cartwright is played in Hoboken, New Jersey.
- July 8 – Battle of Monterey: Acting on instructions from Washington, D.C., Commodore John Drake Sloat orders his troops to occupy Monterey and Yerba Buena thus beginning the United States annexation of California.
- August 11 – Establishment of the Smithsonian Institution in Washington, D.C.
- September 21–24 – Battle of Monterrey: General Pedro de Ampudia and the Mexican Army of the North are defeated by General Zachary Taylor's Army of Occupation, comprising U. S. Regulars, U. S. Volunteers and Texas Rangers. The battle ends after three days of fighting with 120 U. S. soldiers killed, 360 wounded, and 43 missing. The Mexicans suffer 367 killed and wounded.
- November 30 – The Donner Party becomes snowbound.
- December 29 – Iowa is admitted as the 29th U.S. state (see History of Iowa).

=== Undated ===
- The portion of the District of Columbia that was ceded by Virginia in 1789 is re-ceded to it.
- Elias Howe patents the sewing machine.
- Stevens Linen Works business established in Dudley, Massachusetts.
- Grinnell College, then called Iou University, is founded in Grinnell, Iowa Territory.

=== Ongoing ===
- Mexican–American War (1846–1848)

== Births ==
- January 9 – Verner Clarges, silent film actor (died 1911)
- January 26 – Benjamin Franklin Keith, vaudeville theatre owner (died 1914)
- January 27 – Meriwether Lewis Clark Jr., founder of the Kentucky Derby (died 1899)
- February 2 – Francis Marion Smith, borax magnate (died 1931)
- February 10
  - Peter Remondino, Italian-born physician, author, first president of the San Diego Board of Health, and co-founder of San Diego's first private hospital (died 1926)
  - Ira Remsen, chemist (died 1927)
- February 26 – William F. "Buffalo Bill" Cody, frontiersman, later showman (died 1917)
- March 4 – Franklin J. Drake, admiral (died 1929)
- March 15 – James D. Moffat, 3rd president of Washington & Jefferson College (died 1916)
- March 20 – Rebecca Richardson Joslin, writer, lecturer, benefactor, clubwoman (died 1934)
- March 22 – James Timberlake, lawman (died 1891)
- April 13 – Lucius E. Johnson, railroad executive (died 1921)
- April 14 – Henry Overholser, businessman (died 1915)
- May 18 – Anna Morton, Second Lady of the United States as wife of Levi P. Morton (died 1918)
- May 22 – Rita Cetina Gutiérrez, teacher, poet and activist (died 1908)
- June 8 – Lucien Baker, U.S. Senator from Kansas from 1895 till 1901 (died 1907)
- June 10 – Henry B. Quinby, governor of New Hampshire (died 1924)
- June 11 – William Louis Marshall, general, engineer (died 1920)
- June 13 – Rose Cleveland, Acting First Lady of the United States (died 1918 in Italy)
- June 30 – Frances Margaret Milne, author and librarian
- July 5 – Christian Reid (pen name of Frances Christine Fisher Tiernan), author (died 1920)
- July 26 – Texas Jack Omohundro, frontier scout, actor and cowboy (died 1880)
- August 2 – Abram J. Buckles, soldier and jurist (died 1915)
- August 5 – Louise Manning Hodgkins, educator, author and editor (died 1935)
- August 15 – Albert J. Hopkins, U.S. Senator from Illinois from 1903 to 1909 (died 1922)
- August 18 – Robley Dunglison Evans, admiral (died 1912)
- August 23 – Alexander Milne Calder, sculptor (died 1923)
- August 25 – John Thornton, U.S. Senator from Louisiana from 1910 to 1915 (died 1917)
- September 4 – Daniel Burnham, architect and urban designer (died 1912)
- September 7 – John Porter Merrell, admiral (died 1916)
- September 14 – George B. Selden, patent lawyer and inventor (died 1922)
- September 25 – Watson Heston, cartoonist (died 1905)
- October 6 – George Westinghouse, entrepreneur, engineer (died 1914)
- October 26 – Lewis Boss, astronomer (died 1912)
- November 25 – Carrie Nation, temperance advocate (died 1911)
- December 1 – William Henry Holmes, anthropologist, archaeologist, geologist and museum director (died 1933)

=== Full date unknown ===
- Neil Burgess, comedian (died 1910)
- John Denny, buffalo soldier and Medal of Honor recipient (died 1901)
- Pugsey Hurley, British-born burglar, river pirate and underworld figure in New York City
- Mary Foot Seymour, businesswoman and writer (died 1893)
- Thomas Shaw, buffalo soldier and Medal of Honor recipient (died 1895)
- Thomas Wakeman, founder of the first Sioux Indian YMCA (died 1886)
- James E. Ware, architect, originator of the "dumbbell plan" for New York City tenements (died 1918)

== Deaths ==
- January 5 – Alfred Thomas Agate, artist, painter, and miniaturist (born 1812)
- March 24 – William Lee D. Ewing, U.S. Senator from Illinois in 1834 (born 1795)
- April 27 – Isaac Franklin, interstate slave trader (born 1789)
- May 10 – Jane Irwin Harrison, Acting First Lady of the United States (born 1804)
- May 13 – Sarah Wentworth Apthorp Morton, poet (born 1759)
- August 11 – John Caspar Wild, landscape painter and lithographer (born 1804 in Switzerland)
- August 15 – Samuel Humphreys, naval architect (born 1778)
- September 4 – James Alexander, Jr., U.S. Representative from Ohio from 1837 to 1839 (born 1789)
- September 15 – Jacques Dupré, Louisiana State Representative, State Senator and Governor (born 1773)
- September 16 – Samuel A. Foote, 28th Governor of Connecticut from 1834 to 1835, U.S. Senator from Connecticut from 1827 to 1833 (born 1780)
- October 3 – Benjamin Waterhouse, physician (born 1754)
- November 13 – William Findlay, 4th Governor of Pennsylvania from 1817 to 1820, U.S. Senator from Pennsylvania from 1821 to 1827 (born 1768)
- December 30 – Alexander Barrow, U.S. Senator from Louisiana from 1841 to 1846 (born 1801)
- Isaac Jefferson – Former slave of Thomas Jefferson whose published recollections are an important primary source on life at Monticello

== See also ==
- Timeline of United States history (1820–1859)
