= 1844 in the United States =

- Decades: 1820s; 1830s; 1840s; 1850s; 1860s
- See also: History of the United States (1789–1849); Timeline of United States history (1820–1859); List of years in the United States

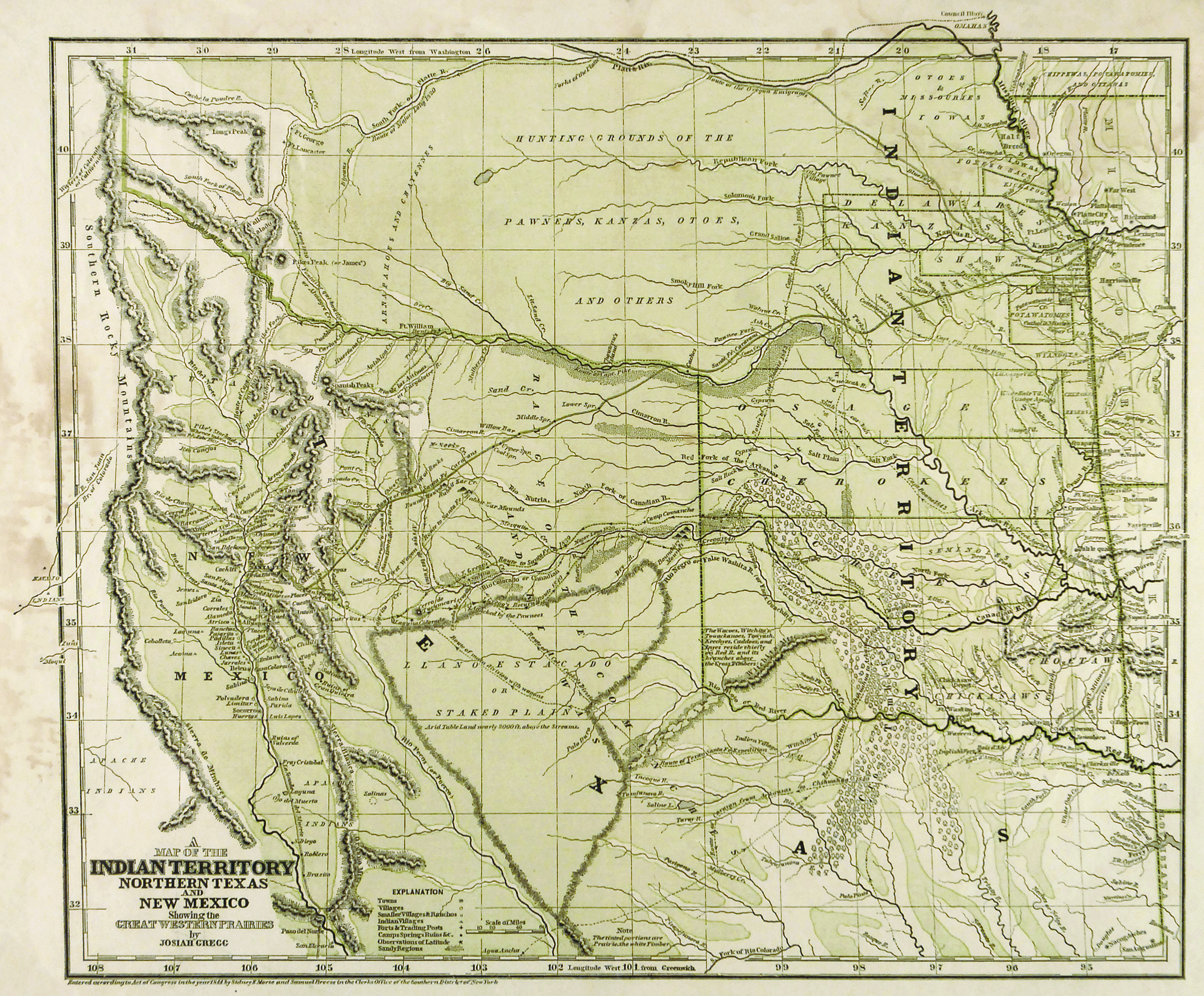
Map of Indian Territory in 1844

Events from the year 1844 in the United States.

== Incumbents ==
=== Federal government ===
- President: John Tyler (I-Virginia)
- Vice President: vacant
- Chief Justice: Roger B. Taney (Maryland)
- Speaker of the House of Representatives: John Winston Jones (D-Virginia)
- Congress: 28th

==== State governments ====
Governors and lieutenant governors

=== Governors ===
- Governor of Alabama: Benjamin Fitzpatrick (Democratic)
- Governor of Arkansas:
  - until April 29: Archibald Yell (Democratic)
  - April 29-November 5: Samuel Adams (Democratic)
  - starting November 5: Thomas Stevenson Drew (Democratic)
- Governor of Connecticut: Chauncey Fitch Cleveland (Democratic) (until May 1), Roger Sherman Baldwin (Whig) (starting May 1)
- Governor of Delaware: William B. Cooper (Whig)
- Governor of Georgia: George W. Crawford (Whig)
- Governor of Illinois: Thomas Ford (Democratic)
- Governor of Indiana: James Whitcomb (Democratic)
- Governor of Kentucky: Robert P. Letcher (Whig) (until September 4), William Owsley (Whig) (starting September 4)
- Governor of Louisiana: Alexandre Mouton (Democratic)
- Governor of Maine:
  - until January 1: Edward Kavanagh (Democratic)
  - January 1-3: David Dunn (Democratic)
  - January 3: John W. Dana (Democratic)
  - starting January 3: Hugh J. Anderson (Democratic)
- Governor of Maryland: Francis Thomas (Democratic)
- Governor of Massachusetts: Marcus Morton (Democratic) (until January), George N. Briggs (Democratic) (starting January)
- Governor of Michigan: John S. Barry (Democratic)
- Governor of Mississippi: Tilghman Tucker (Democratic) (until January 10), Albert G. Brown (Democratic) (starting January 10)
- Governor of Missouri:
  - until February 9: Thomas Reynolds (Democratic)
  - February 9-November 20: Meredith Miles Marmaduke (Democratic)
  - starting November 20: John C. Edwards (Democratic)
- Governor of New Hampshire: Henry Hubbard (Democratic) (until June 6), John H. Steele (Democratic) (starting June 6)
- Governor of New Jersey: Daniel Haines (Democratic)
- Governor of New York: William C. Bouck (Democratic) (until end of December 31)
- Governor of North Carolina: John Motley Morehead (Whig)
- Governor of Ohio:
  - until April 15: Wilson Shannon (Democratic)
  - April 15-December 3: Thomas W. Bartley (Democratic)
  - starting December 3: Mordecai Bartley (Democratic)
- Governor of Pennsylvania: David R. Porter (Democratic)
- Governor of Rhode Island: James Fenner (Law and Order)
- Governor of South Carolina: James Henry Hammond (Democratic) (until December 7), William Aiken, Jr. (Democratic) (starting December 7)
- Governor of Tennessee: James C. Jones (Whig)
- Governor of Vermont: John Mattocks (Whig) (until October 11), William Slade (Whig) (starting October 11)
- Governor of Virginia: James McDowell (Democratic)

=== Lieutenant government ===
- Lieutenant Governor of Connecticut: William S. Holabird (Democratic) (until May 1), Reuben Booth (Whig) (starting May 1)
- Lieutenant Governor of Illinois: John Moore (Democratic)
- Lieutenant Governor of Indiana: Jesse D. Bright (Democratic)
- Lieutenant Governor of Kentucky: Manlius Valerius Thomson (political party unknown) (until September 4), Archibald Dixon (Whig) (starting September 4)
- Lieutenant Governor of Massachusetts: Henry H. Childs (political party unknown) (until month and day unknown), John Reed, Jr. (political party unknown) (starting month and day unknown)
- Lieutenant Governor of Michigan: Origen D. Richardson (Whig)
- Lieutenant Governor of Missouri:
  - until February 9: Meredith Miles Marmaduke (Democratic)
  - February 9-November 20: vacant
  - starting November 20: James Young (Democratic)
- Lieutenant Governor of New York: Daniel S. Dickinson (Democratic) (until end of December 31)
- Lieutenant Governor of Rhode Island: Byron Diman (political party unknown)
- Lieutenant Governor of South Carolina: Isaac Donnom Witherspoon (Democratic) (until December 7), John Fulton Ervin (Democratic) (starting December 7)
- Lieutenant Governor of Vermont: Horace Eaton (Whig)

== Events ==
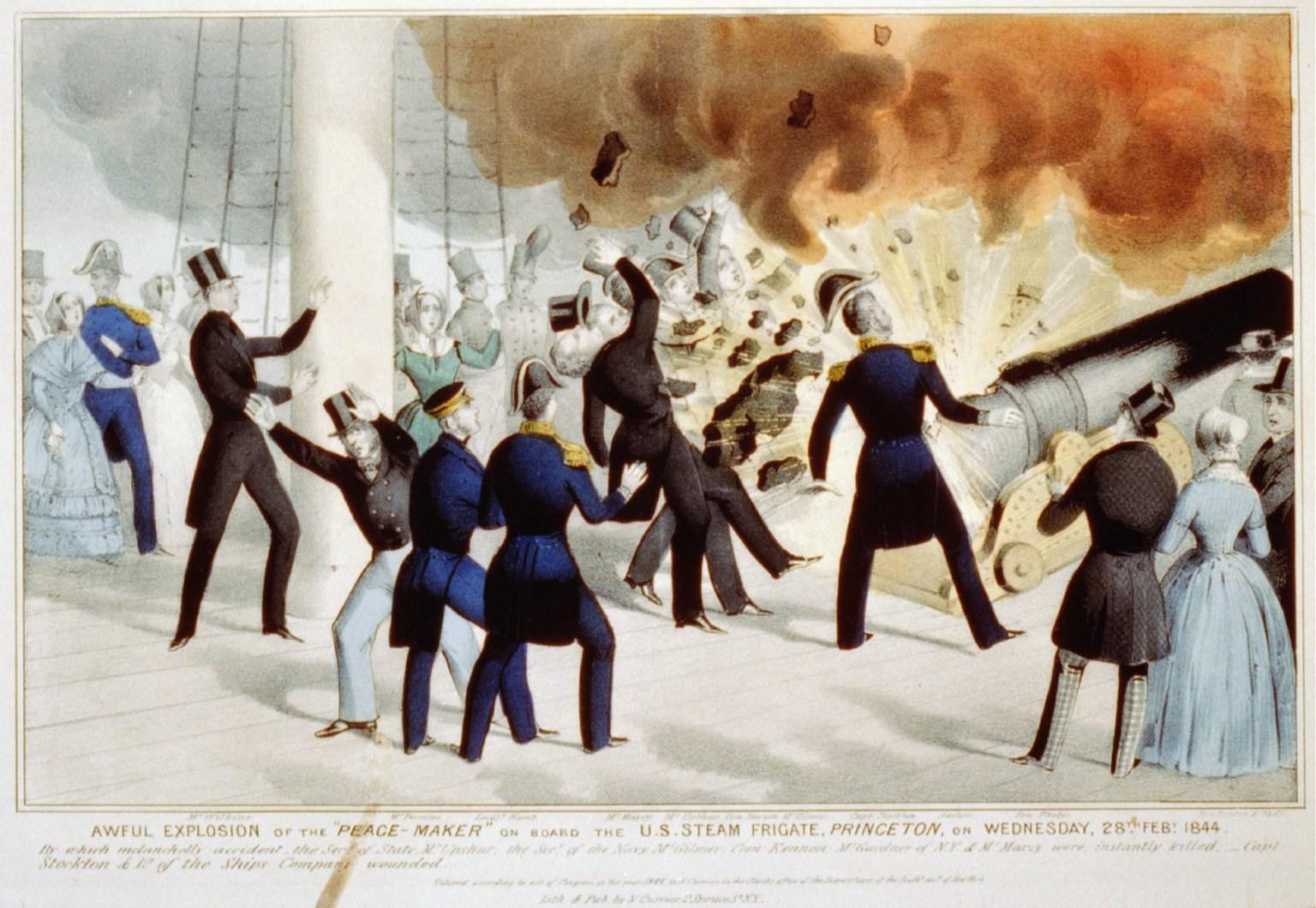
February 28: USS Princeton disaster

- January 15 – The University of Notre Dame receives its charter from Indiana.
- February 28 – The "Peacemaker", the largest naval gun in the world, explodes during a demonstration aboard the USS Princeton on the Potomac River, killing six, including Secretary of State Abel P. Upshur and Secretary of the Navy Thomas Walker Gilmer.
- March 12 – The Columbus and Xenia Railroad, the first railroad that is planned to be built in Ohio, is chartered.
- May 24 – The first electrical telegram is sent by Samuel F. B. Morse from the U.S. Capitol in Washington, D.C. to the B&O Railroad "outer depot" in Baltimore, Maryland, saying "What hath God wrought".
- June–July – The Great Flood of 1844 hits the Missouri River and Mississippi River.
- June 15 – Charles Goodyear receives a patent for vulcanization, a process to strengthen rubber.
- June 22 – Influential North American student fraternity Delta Kappa Epsilon is founded at Yale College.
- June 27 – Killing of Joseph Smith: Joseph Smith, founder of the Latter Day Saint movement, and his brother Hyrum are killed in Carthage Jail, Carthage, Illinois by an armed mob, leading to a succession crisis in the movement. John Taylor, future president of the Church of Jesus Christ of Latter-day Saints, is severely injured but survives; Willard Richards survives with a light wound.
- July 3 – The U.S. signs the Treaty of Wanghia with Qing dynasty China, the first diplomatic agreement between the two nations in history.
- July 25 – Exclusion Law in Oregon prohibits African Americans (including slaves) from entering or remaining in the territory
- August 8 – During a meeting held in Nauvoo, Illinois, the Quorum of the Twelve, headed by Brigham Young, is chosen as the leading body of the Church of Jesus Christ of Latter-day Saints.
- October 22 – The Great Disappointment: Millerites (including future members of the Seventh-day Adventist Church) find that the Second Coming of Jesus does not occur as predicted by preacher William Miller.
- December 4 – 1844 United States presidential election: James K. Polk of Tennessee defeats Henry Clay of Kentucky.
- Undated
  - The first ever international cricket match is played in New York City between Canada and the United States.
  - The United American Cemetery is founded in Cincinnati, Ohio.

== Births ==
- March 12 – Patrick Collins, lawyer, 37th Mayor of Boston and U.S. Representatives from Massachusetts (died 1905)
- April 13 – John Surratt, suspected involvement in the assassination of Abraham Lincoln, son of Mary Surratt (died 1916)
- April 22 – Lewis Powell, conspirator with John Wilkes Booth, attempted assassin of William H. Seward (died 1865)
- May 2 - Elijah McCoy, inventor of the automatic steam engine lubricator (died 1929)
- June 1 – John J. Toffey, Medal of Honor recipient (died 1911)
- June 3 – Garret Hobart, 24th vice president of the United States from 1897 till 1899. (died 1899)
- July 9 – Charles D. Barney, stockbroker (died 1945)
- August 1 – Levi Ankeny, United States Senator from Washington from 1903 till 1909. (died 1921)
- August 24 – Charles B. Clark, politician and entrepreneur (died 1891)
- October 11 – Henry J. Heinz, entrepreneur and founder of the H. J. Heinz Company (died 1919)
- Full date unknown:
  - Edwin H. Tomlinson, world traveler and benefactor (died 1938)

== Deaths ==
- January 13 – Alexander Porter, United States Senator from Louisiana from 1833 till 1837. (born 1785)
- January 25 – Horace H. Hayden, first licensed American dentist (born 1769)
- February 27 – Nicholas Biddle, financier, last president of the Second Bank of the United States (born 1786)
- February 28 –
  - Abel P. Upshur, Secretary of State from 1843 to 1844 (born 1790)
  - Thomas W. Gilmer, fifteenth Secretary of the Navy (born 1802)
- March 6 – Gabriel Duvall, Justice of the U.S. Supreme Court from 1811 to 1835 (born 1752)
- May 18 – Richard McCarty, politician (born 1780)
- April 4 – Charles Bulfinch, architect of the Massachusetts State House (born 1763)
- April 21 – Henry Baldwin, Associate Justice of the US Supreme Court, 1830–1844 (born 1780)
- June 27 Joseph Smith Jr., religious leader and founder of Mormonism and the Latter Day Saint movement (born 1805)
- July 23 – Christian Gobrecht, third Chief Engraver of the United States Mint from 1840 to 1844 (born 1785)
- August 15 – William S. Fulton, United States Senator from Arkansas 1836 till 1844. (born 1795)
- September 14 – Oliver Holden, composer (born 1765)

== See also ==
- Timeline of United States history (1820–1859)
