= 1848 in the United States =

- Decades: 1820s; 1830s; 1840s; 1850s; 1860s
- See also: History of the United States (1789–1849); Timeline of United States history (1820–1859); List of years in the United States

Events from the year 1848 in the United States.

== Incumbents ==
=== Federal government ===
- President: James K. Polk (D-Tennessee)
- Vice President: George M. Dallas (D-Pennsylvania)
- Chief Justice: Roger B. Taney (Maryland)
- Speaker of the House of Representatives: Robert Charles Winthrop (W-Massachusetts)
- Congress: 30th

==== State governments ====
Governors and lieutenant governors

=== Governors ===
- Governor of Alabama: Reuben Chapman (Democratic)
- Governor of Arkansas: Thomas Stevenson Drew (Democratic)
- Governor of Connecticut: Clark Bissell (Whig)
- Governor of Delaware: William Tharp (Democratic)
- Governor of Florida: William Dunn Moseley (Democratic)
- Governor of Georgia: George W. Towns (Democratic)
- Governor of Illinois: Augustus C. French (Democratic)
- Governor of Indiana: James Whitcomb (Democratic) (until December 26), Paris C. Dunning (Democratic) (starting December 26)
- Governor of Iowa: Ansel Briggs (Democratic)
- Governor of Kentucky: William Owsley (Whig) (until September 6), John J. Crittenden (Whig) (starting September 6)
- Governor of Louisiana: Isaac Johnson (Democratic)
- Governor of Maine: John W. Dana (Democratic)
- Governor of Maryland: Thomas Pratt (Democratic) (until January 3), Philip F. Thomas (Democratic) (starting January 3)
- Governor of Massachusetts: George N. Briggs (Democratic)
- Governor of Michigan: William L. Greenly (Democratic) (until January 3), Epaphroditus Ransom (Democratic) (starting January 3)
- Governor of Mississippi: Albert G. Brown (Democratic) (until January 10), Joseph W. Matthews (Democratic) (starting January 10)
- Governor of Missouri: John C. Edwards (Democratic) (until November 20), Austin Augustus King (Democratic) (starting November 20)
- Governor of New Hampshire: Jared W. Williams (Democratic)
- Governor of New Jersey: Charles C. Stratton (Whig) (until January 18), Daniel Haines (Democratic) (starting January 18)
- Governor of New York: John Young (Whig) (until end of December 31)
- Governor of North Carolina: William Alexander Graham (Whig)
- Governor of Ohio: William Bebb (Whig)
- Governor of Pennsylvania: Francis R. Shunk (Democratic) (until July 9), William F. Johnston (Whig) (starting July 9)
- Governor of Rhode Island: Elisha Harris (Law and Order)
- Governor of South Carolina: David Johnson (Democratic) (until December 12), Whitemarsh B. Seabrook (Democratic) (starting December 12)
- Governor of Tennessee: Neill S. Brown (Whig)
- Governor of Texas: George T. Wood (Democratic)
- Governor of Vermont: Horace Eaton (Whig) (until October), Carlos Coolidge (Whig) (starting October)
- Governor of Virginia: William Smith (Democratic)
- Governor of Wisconsin: vacant (until June 7), Nelson Dewey (Democratic) (starting June 7)

=== Lieutenant governors ===
- Lieutenant Governor of Connecticut: Charles J. McCurdy (Whig)
- Lieutenant Governor of Illinois: Joseph Wells (Democratic)
- Lieutenant Governor of Indiana: Paris C. Dunning (Democratic) (until December 26), vacant (starting December 26)
- Lieutenant Governor of Kentucky: Archibald Dixon (Whig) (until September 6), John LaRue Helm (Whig) (starting September 6)
- Lieutenant Governor of Louisiana: Trasimond Landry (Whig)
- Lieutenant Governor of Massachusetts: John Reed, Jr. (political party unknown)
- Lieutenant Governor of Michigan: vacant (until month and day unknown), William M. Fenton (Democratic) (starting month and day unknown)
- Lieutenant Governor of Missouri: James Young (Democratic) (until November 20), Thomas Lawson Price (Democratic) (starting November 20)
- Lieutenant Governor of New York: Hamilton Fish (Democratic) (until end of December 31)
- Lieutenant Governor of Rhode Island: Edward W. Lawton (political party unknown)
- Lieutenant Governor of South Carolina: William Cain (Democratic) (until December 12), William Henry Gist (Democratic) (starting December 12)
- Lieutenant Governor of Texas: John Alexander Greer (Democratic)
- Lieutenant Governor of Vermont: Leonard Sargeant (Whig) (until October), Robert Pierpoint (Whig) (starting October)
- Lieutenant Governor of Wisconsin: John E. Holmes (Democratic) (starting June 7)

== Events ==
February 2: The Treaty of Guadalupe Hidalgo is signed, ending the Mexican–American War and ceding all the Republic of Texas's territorial claims to the United States for $15m.

=== January–March ===
- January 24 – California Gold Rush: James W. Marshall finds gold at Sutter's Mill, in Coloma, California.
- January 31 – The Washington Monument is established.
- February 2 – Mexican–American War: The Treaty of Guadalupe Hidalgo is signed, ending the war and ceding to the U.S. virtually all of what becomes the southwestern United States in exchange for $15 million.
- March 18 – The Boston Public Library is founded by an act of the Great and General Court of Massachusetts.

May 29: Wisconsin admitted as the 30th U.S. state.

=== April–June ===
- April 3 – The Chicago Board of Trade is founded by 82 Chicago merchants and business leaders.
- April 23 – The Illinois and Michigan Canal is completed.
- May 19 – The Treaty of Guadalupe Hidalgo (February 2), ending the Mexican–American War, is ratified by the Mexican government.
- May 29 – Wisconsin is admitted as the 30th U.S. state (see History of Wisconsin).
- June 14–15 – The Liberty Party National Convention is held in Buffalo, New York. Presidential candidate Gerrit Smith establishes woman suffrage as a party plank.

=== July–September ===
- July 19 – Seneca Falls Convention: The first women's rights convention opens in Seneca Falls, New York.
- July 26 – The University of Wisconsin–Madison is founded.
- August 9 – The abolitionist Free Soil Party is founded by former president, Martin Van Buren in Buffalo, New York.
- August 14 – Oregon Territory is established.
- August 19 – California Gold Rush: The New York Herald breaks the news to the East Coast of the United States that there is a gold rush in California (although the rush started in January).
- September 12 – One of the successes of the Revolutions of 1848, the Swiss Federal Constitution, patterned on the U.S. Constitution, enters into force, creating a federal republic and one of the first modern democratic states in Europe.
- September 13 – Vermont railroad worker Phineas Gage incredibly survives a 3-foot-plus iron rod being driven through his head.
- September 20 – The American Association for the Advancement of Science (AAAS) is founded in Philadelphia.

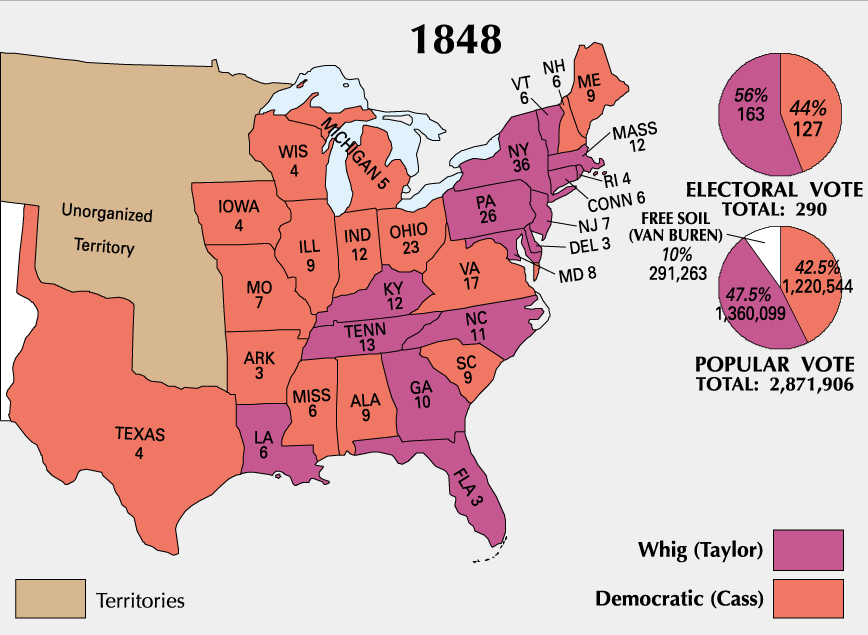
November 7: The first U.S. presidential election held in every state on the same day sees Whig Zachary Taylor of Virginia defeat Democrat Lewis Cass of Michigan.

=== October–December ===
- November 1 – The first medical school for women, The Boston Female Medical School (which later merges with Boston University School of Medicine), opens in Boston, Massachusetts.
- November 7 – 1848 United States presidential election: Whig Zachary Taylor of Louisiana defeats Democrat Lewis Cass of Michigan and Free Soil Party candidate and former president Martin Van Buren in the first U.S. presidential election to be held in every state on the same day.
- December 21 – Ellen and William Craft, enslaved in Georgia, begin their journey to freedom in Philadelphia.
- December 26 – The Phi Delta Theta fraternity is founded at Miami University.

=== No fixed date ===
- Rhodes College is founded in Clarksville, Tennessee as the Masonic University of Tennessee.
- The Shaker song "Simple Gifts" is written by Joseph Brackett in Alfred, Maine.

=== Ongoing ===
- Mexican–American War (1846–1848)
- California Gold Rush (1848–1855)

== Births ==
- January 13 – Lilla Cabot Perry, painter (died 1933)
- February 20 – E. H. Harriman, railroad executive (died 1909)
- February 22 – Emily McGary Selinger, painter, author and educator (died 1927)
- March 8 – LaMarcus Adna Thompson, inventor (died 1919)
- March 19 – Wyatt Earp, lawman and gunfighter (died 1929)
- March 26 – Edward O. Wolcott, U.S. Senator from Colorado from 1889 to 1901 (died 1905)
- May 10 – Lafayette Young, U.S. Senator from Iowa from 1910 to 1911 (died 1926)
- June 15 – Sol Smith Russell, comedian (died 1902)
- July 22 – Winfield Scott Stratton, miner (died 1902)
- August 24 – Kate Claxton, actress (died 1924)
- September 4 – Lewis Howard Latimer, African American inventor (died 1928)
- September 29 – Caroline Yale, educator (died 1933)
- October 6 – Webb C. Ball, jeweler and watchmaker from Fredericktown, Ohio (died 1922)
- October 15 – Harmon Northrop Morse, chemist (died 1920)
- November 1 – Caroline Still Anderson, African American physician, educator and activist (died 1919)
- November 2 – Stephen Mallory II, U.S. Senator from Florida from 1897 to 1907 (died 1907)
- November 7 – B. B. Comer, 33rd Governor of Alabama, U.S. Senator from Alabama in 1920 (died 1927)
- November 20 – James M. Spangler, inventor (died 1915)
- November 27 – Henry A. Rowland, physicist (died 1901)

== Deaths ==
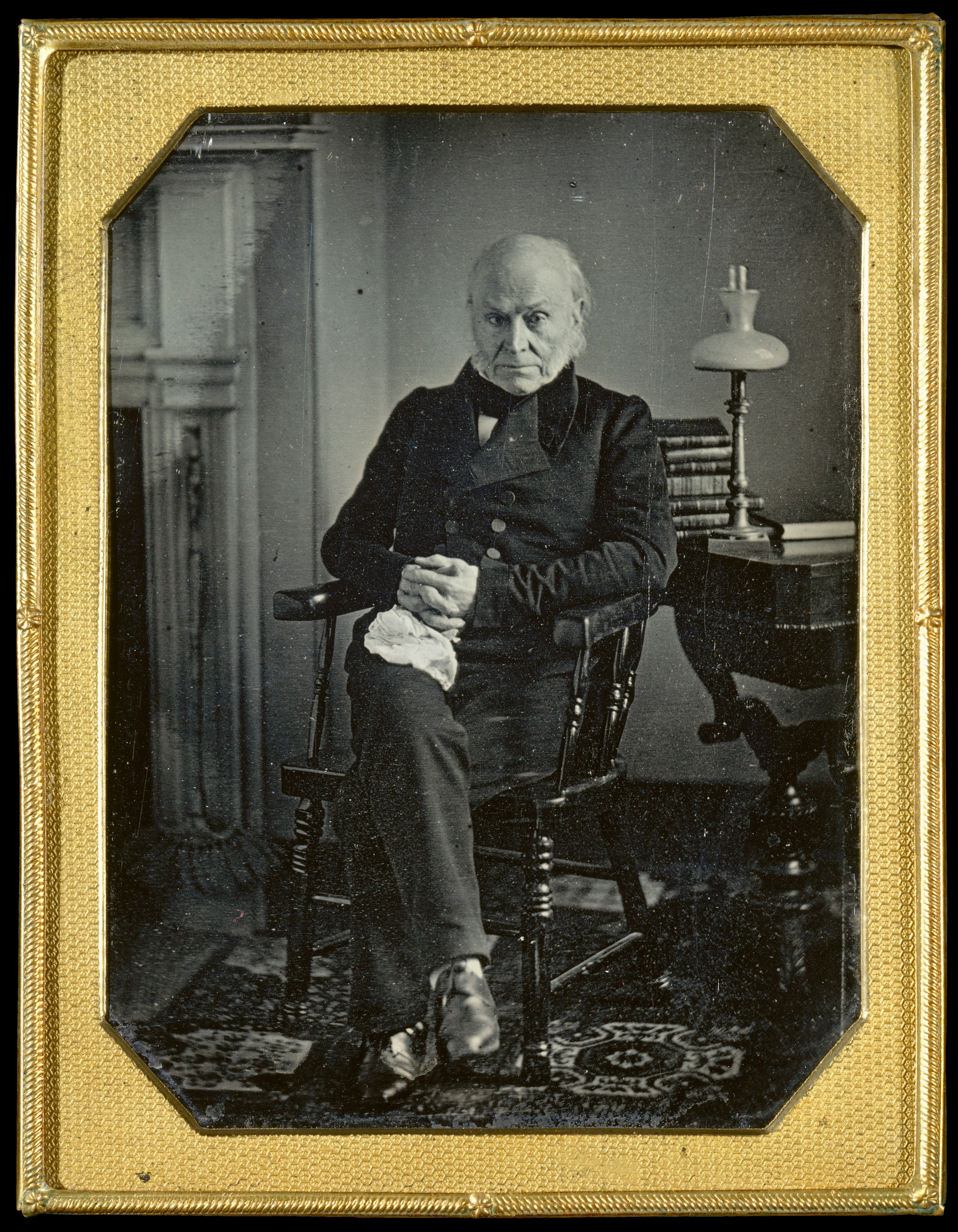
John Quincy Adams

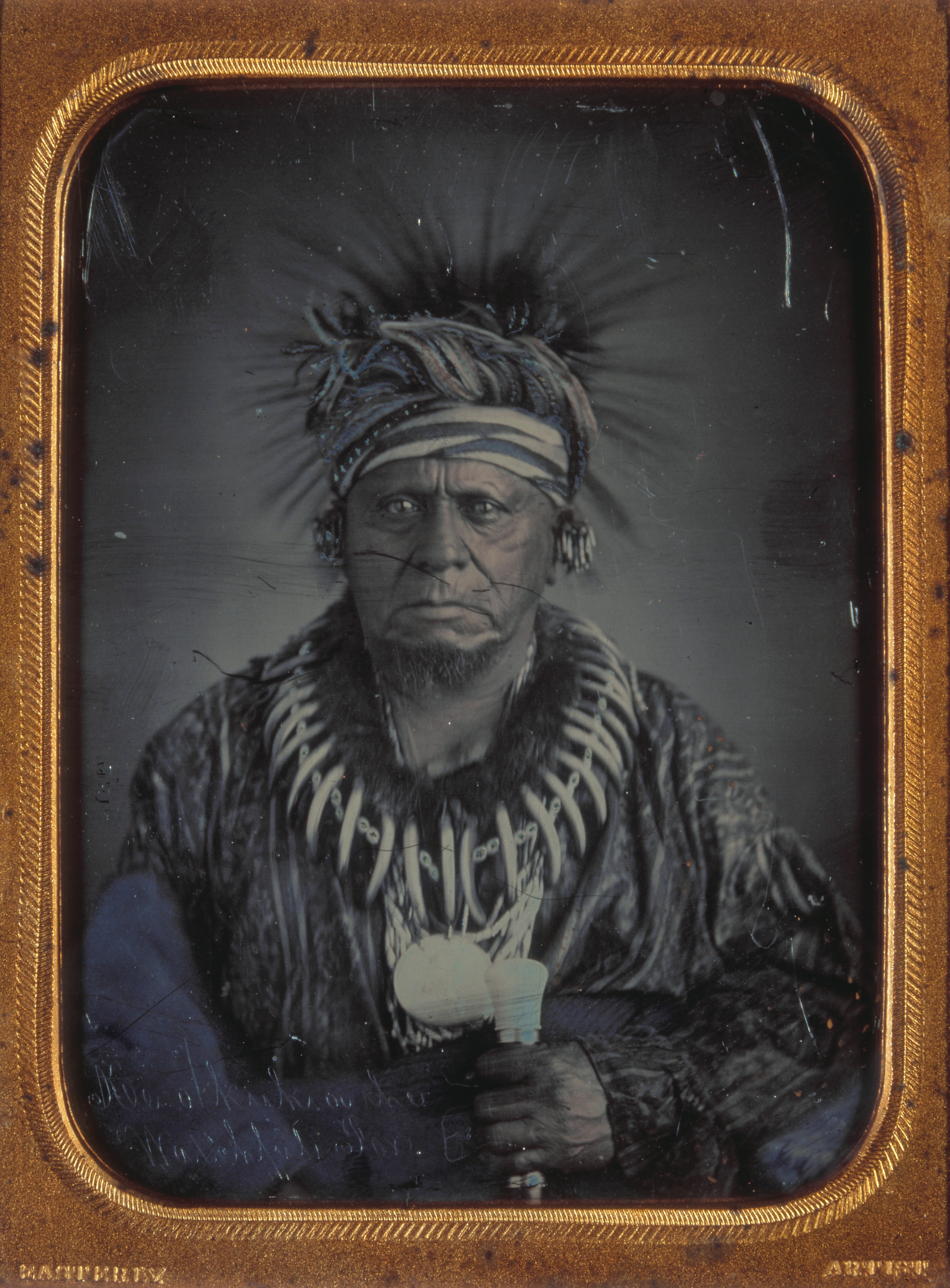
Keokuk

- February 11 – Thomas Cole, landscape painter (born 1801 in the United Kingdom)
- February 23 – John Quincy Adams, sixth president of the United States from 1825 to 1829 (born 1767)
- February 25 – Ona Judge, escaped from slavery at George Washington's Mount Vernon (b. c. 1773)
- March 29 – John Jacob Astor, businessman (born 1763)
- April 29 – Chester Ashley, U.S. Senator from Arkansas from 1844 to 1848 (born 1790)
- May 18 – William Leidesdorff, businessman (born 1810)
- Early June &nash; Keokuk, chief of the Sauk people (Thâkîwaki) (born c. 1780)
- June 26 – Stevenson Archer, U.S. Congressman from Maryland from 1819 to 1821 (born 1786)
- July 20 – Francis R. Shunk, politician (born 1788)
- August 15 – Timothy Olmstead, composer, fifer in the American Revolutionary War (born 1759)
- August 30 – Simon Willard, horologist (born 1753)
- October 12 – William Dutch (Cherokee: ᏔᏥ), in Indian Territory
- October 25 – Dixon Hall Lewis, U.S. Senator from Alabama from 1844 to 1848 (born 1802)
- December 31 – Ambrose Hundley Sevier, U.S. Senator from Arkansas from 1836 to 1848 (born 1801)

== See also ==
- Timeline of United States history (1820–1859)
