= 1785 in the United States =

- Decades: 1770s; 1780s; 1790s; 1800s
- See also: History of the United States (1776–1789); Timeline of the American Revolution; List of years in the United States

Events from the year 1785 in the United States.

== Incumbents ==
- Sixth Confederation Congress (January 11, 1785 – November 4, 1785, New York, New York), Seventh Confederation Congress (November 7, 1785 – November 3, 1786, New York)
- President of the Confederation Congress: Richard Henry Lee (until November 4, 1785), John Hancock (starting November 23, 1785)

== Events ==
- January 7 – Frenchman Jean-Pierre Blanchard and American John Jeffries travel from Dover, England to Calais, France in a hydrogen gas balloon, becoming the first to cross the English Channel by air.
- January 11 – The Confederation Congress reconvenes in New York City having previously convened in Trenton, New Jersey.
- January 21 – The Treaty of Fort McIntosh is signed between the U.S. government and representatives of the Wyandotte, Delaware, Chippewa and Ottawa nations of Native Americans.
- January 27 – The University of Georgia is granted a charter (written by Abraham Baldwin) by the Georgia General Assembly meeting in Savannah. The first students are admitted in Athens, Georgia in 1801.
- March 28 – Delegates from Virginia and Maryland meet at the Mount Vernon Conference to deal with issues regarding use of the Pocomoke and Potomac Rivers and the Chesapeake Bay. A suggestion to expand the interstate negotiations eventually leads to the Annapolis Convention (1786).
- May 20 – The Land Ordinance of 1785 is adopted by the United States Congress to raise money by selling land acquired from the Treaty of Paris and the Public Land Survey System is established to map it.
- June 1 – John Adams, the first American ambassador to Great Britain, has his first meeting with King George III at the Court of St James's.
- July 6 – The United States dollar is unanimously chosen as the country's money unit, the first time a nation has adopted a decimal currency.
- September 10 – The Treaty of Amity and Commerce between the Kingdom of Prussia and the U.S. is signed, promoting free trade and demanding unconditionally humane custody for prisoners of war, a novelty at this time.
- November 28 – The Treaty of Hopewell is signed between the U.S. and the Cherokee Nation.
- December 29 – The North Carolina General Assembly incorporates Lincolnton, North Carolina (named for American General Benjamin Lincoln) as the new county seat for Lincoln County.

=== Ongoing ===
- Articles of Confederation in effect (1781–1789)
- Northwest Indian War (1785–1795)

== Births ==
- January 1 – Gabriel Moore, U.S. Senator from Alabama from 1831 to 1837 (died 1845)
- January 13 – Samuel Woodworth, author, literary journalist, playwright, librettist and poet (died 1842)
- March 11 – John McLean, politician, Associate Justice of the Supreme Court of the United States (died 1861)
- April 6 – John Pierpont, poet, teacher, lawyer, merchant and Congregational minister (died 1866)
- April 26 – John James Audubon, ornithologist, naturalist and painter, born in Saint-Domingue (died 1851)
- June 24 – Alexander Porter, U.S. Senator from Louisiana from 1833 to 1837, born in County Donegal, Ireland (died 1844)
- August 23 – Oliver Hazard Perry, naval officer (died 1819)
- September 1 – Philip Allen, U.S. Senator from Rhode Island from 1853 to 1859 (died 1865)
- September 11 – Presley Spruance, U.S. Senator from Delaware from 1847 to 1853 (died 1863)
- September 26 – Charles Bird King, portrait artist, painter of Native American delegates visiting Washington, D.C. (died 1862)
- September 27 – David Walker, African American abolitionist (died 1830)
- November 21 – William Beaumont, physician and surgeon (died 1853)
- December 23
  - Alfred Cuthbert, U.S. Senator from Georgia from 1835 to 1843 (died 1856)
  - Christian Gobrecht, engraver, designer of the United States Seated Liberty coinage (died 1844)

== Deaths ==
- January 6 – Haym Salomon, Jewish financier of the American Revolution (born 1740 in Poland)
- July 13 – Stephen Hopkins, signatory of the United States Declaration of Independence (born 1707)
- August 17 – Jonathan Trumbull, Governor of the Colony and the state of Connecticut (born 1710)
- November 28 – William Whipple, signatory of the United States Declaration of Independence, representative of New Hampshire (born 1730)

== See also ==
- Timeline of the American Revolution (1760–1789)
