= 1845 in the United States =

- Decades: 1820s; 1830s; 1840s; 1850s; 1860s
- See also: History of the United States (1789–1849); Timeline of the history of the United States (1820-1859); List of years in the United States

Events from the year 1845 in the United States.

== Incumbents ==
=== Federal government ===
- President:

John Tyler (I-Virginia) (until March 4)
James K. Polk (D-Tennessee) (starting March 4)

- Vice President:

vacant (until March 4)
George M. Dallas (D-Pennsylvania) (starting March 4)

- Chief Justice: Roger B. Taney (Maryland)
- Speaker of the House of Representatives:

John Winston Jones (D-Virginia) (until March 4)
John Wesley Davis (D-Indiana) (starting December 1)

- Congress: 28th (until March 4), 29th (starting March 4)

==== State governments ====
Governors and lieutenant governors

=== Governors ===
- Governor of Alabama: Benjamin Fitzpatrick (Democratic) (until December 10), Joshua L. Martin (Independent) (starting December 10)
- Governor of Arkansas: Thomas Stevenson Drew (Democratic)
- Governor of Connecticut: Roger Sherman Baldwin (Whig)
- Governor of Delaware: William B. Cooper (Whig) (until January 21), Thomas Stockton (Whig) (starting January 21)
- Governor of Florida: John Branch (Democratic) (until June 25), William Dunn Moseley (Democratic) (starting June 25)
- Governor of Georgia: George W. Crawford (Whig)
- Governor of Illinois: Thomas Ford (Democratic)
- Governor of Indiana: James Whitcomb (Democratic)
- Governor of Kentucky: William Owsley (Whig)
- Governor of Louisiana: Alexandre Mouton (Democratic)
- Governor of Maine: Hugh J. Anderson (Democratic)
- Governor of Maryland: Francis Thomas (Democratic) (until January 6), Thomas Pratt (Democratic) (starting January 6)
- Governor of Massachusetts: George N. Briggs (Democratic)
- Governor of Michigan: John S. Barry (Democratic)
- Governor of Mississippi: Albert G. Brown (Democratic)
- Governor of Missouri: John C. Edwards (Democratic)
- Governor of New Hampshire: John H. Steele (Democratic)
- Governor of New Jersey: Daniel Haines (Democratic) (until January 21), Charles C. Stratton (Whig) (starting January 21)
- Governor of New York: Silas Wright (Democratic) (starting January 1)
- Governor of North Carolina: John Motley Morehead (Whig) (until January 1), William Alexander Graham (Whig) (starting January 1)
- Governor of Ohio: Mordecai Bartley (Democratic)
- Governor of Pennsylvania: David R. Porter (Democratic) (until January 21), Francis R. Shunk (Democratic) (starting January 21)
- Governor of Rhode Island: James Fenner (Law and Order) (until May 6), Charles Jackson (Know Nothing) (starting May 6)
- Governor of South Carolina: William Aiken, Jr. (Democratic)
- Governor of Tennessee: James C. Jones (Whig) (until October 14), Aaron V. Brown (Democratic) (starting October 14)
- Governor of Texas: Anson Jones (political party unknown) (starting December 29)
- Governor of Vermont: William Slade (Whig)
- Governor of Virginia: James McDowell (Democratic)

=== Lieutenant governors ===
- Lieutenant Governor of Connecticut: Reuben Booth (Whig)
- Lieutenant Governor of Illinois: John Moore (Democratic)
- Lieutenant Governor of Indiana: Jesse D. Bright (Democratic) (until March 4), vacant (starting March 4)
- Lieutenant Governor of Kentucky: Archibald Dixon (Whig)
- Lieutenant Governor of Massachusetts: John Reed, Jr. (political party unknown)
- Lieutenant Governor of Michigan: Origen D. Richardson (Whig)
- Lieutenant Governor of Missouri: James Young (Democratic)
- Lieutenant Governor of New York: Addison Gardiner (Democratic) (starting January 1)
- Lieutenant Governor of Rhode Island: Byron Diman (political party unknown)
- Lieutenant Governor of South Carolina: John Fulton Ervin (Democratic)
- Lieutenant Governor of Vermont: Horace Eaton (Whig)

== Events ==
=== January–March ===
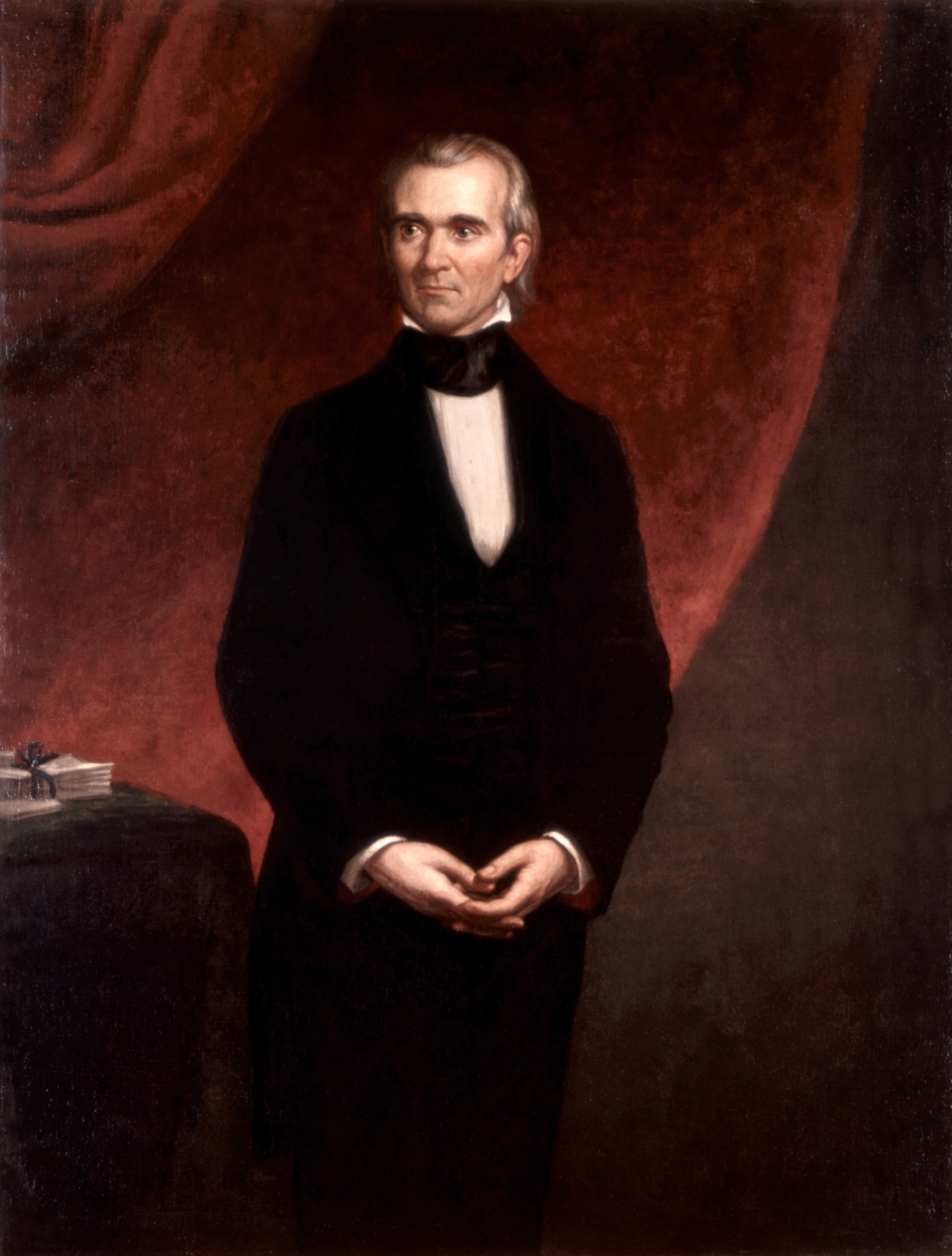
March 4: James K. Polk becomes the 11th U.S. president

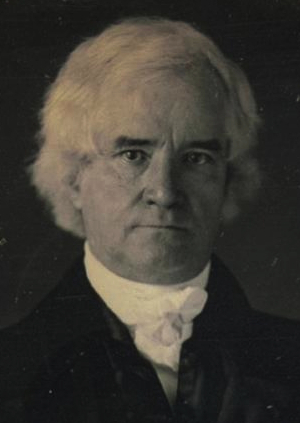
George M. Dallas becomes the 11th U.S. vice president

- January 1 – The Cobble Hill Tunnel in Brooklyn is completed.
- January 29 – "The Raven" by Edgar Allan Poe is published for the first time (New York Evening Mirror).
- February 1 – Anson Jones, President of the Republic of Texas, signs the charter officially creating Baylor University in present-day Waco, which becomes the oldest university in the State of Texas operating under its original name.
- February 28 – The United States Congress approves the annexation of Texas.
- March 1 – President John Tyler signs a bill authorizing the United States to annex the Republic of Texas.
- March 3
  - Florida is admitted as the 27th U.S. state (see History of Florida).
  - Postal reform act of Congress standardizes nationwide mail rates.
- March 4
  - The United States Congress passes legislation overriding a presidential veto for the first time.
  - James K. Polk is sworn in as the 11th president of the United States, and George M. Dallas is sworn in as 11th vice president.

=== April–June ===
- April 10 – The Great Fire of Pittsburgh destroys much of the city of Pittsburgh, Pennsylvania.
- April 21 – Peoria, Illinois is incorporated a city.
- May – Frederick Douglass's Narrative of the Life of Frederick Douglass, an American Slave, written by himself, is published by the Boston Anti-Slavery Society.
- May 23 – New York City Police Department (NYPD) is formed, replacing an old night watch system.

=== July–September ===
- July 4 – Near Concord, Massachusetts, Henry David Thoreau embarks on a 2-year experiment in simple living at Walden Pond (see Walden).
- July 19 – Great New York City Fire of 1845 breaks out in Lower Manhattan.
- July–August – In the United States Magazine and Democratic Review editor John L. O'Sullivan declares that foreign powers are trying to prevent American annexation of Texas in order to impede "the fulfillment [sic] of our manifest destiny to overspread the continent allotted by Providence for the free development of our yearly multiplying millions", the first use of the phrase "Manifest Destiny".
- August 28 – The journal Scientific American begins publication.

=== October–December ===
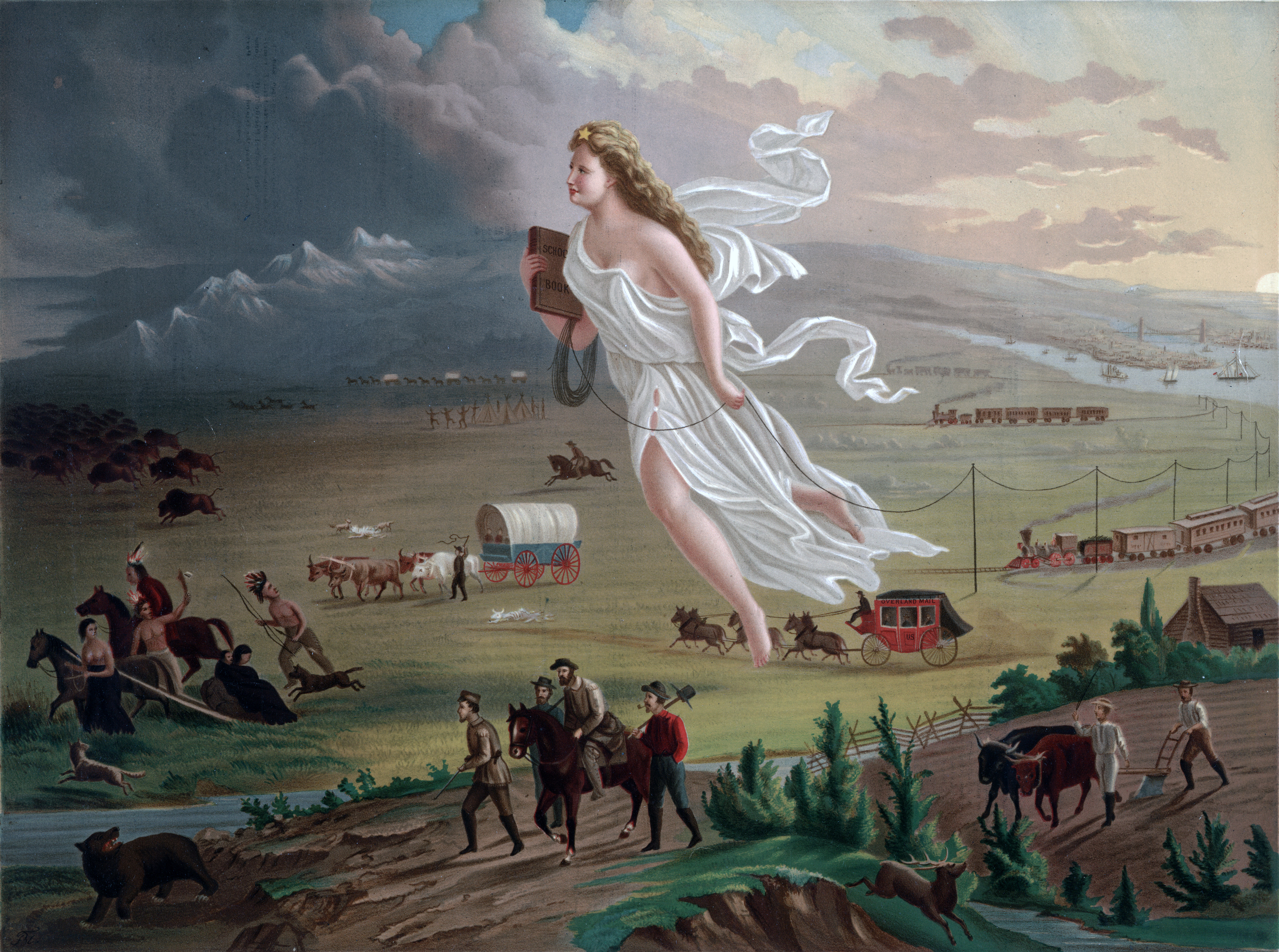
December 27: The term "Manifest Destiny" is influentially used by John L. O'Sullivan (the concept is depicted in this 1872 painting by John Gast)

- October 10 – In Annapolis, Maryland, the Best School (later renamed the United States Naval Academy) opens with 50 midshipmen students and 7 professors.
- October 13 – A majority of voters in the Republic of Texas approve a proposed constitution, that if accepted by the United States Congress, will make Texas a U.S. state.
- October 21 – The New York Herald becomes the first newspaper to mention the game of baseball.
- October 22 – The New York Morning News becomes the first newspaper to include a box-score of a baseball game.
- December 2 – Manifest Destiny: U.S. President James K. Polk announces to Congress that the Monroe Doctrine should be strictly enforced and that the United States should aggressively expand into the West.
- December 5 – The Templars of Honor and Temperance is founded in the United States.
- December 6 – Alpha Sigma Phi fraternity is founded.
- December 9 – Joshua L. Martin is sworn in as the 12th governor of Alabama replacing Benjamin Fitzpatrick.
- December 27
  - Anesthesia is used for childbirth for the first time (Dr. Crawford Long in Jefferson, Georgia).
  - American journalist John L. O'Sullivan claims in a newspaper article (in connection with the annexation of the Oregon Country) that the United States has a "Manifest Destiny" to expand its borders, the second time he uses the term; it will have a huge influence on the American imperialistic movement of the 19th century.
- December 29 – Texas is admitted as the 28th U.S. state (see History of Texas).

=== Unknown date ===
- Spaniards find Lost Dutchman Mine, Arizona.

== Births ==
- January 8 – Minnie Willis Baines, American author (died 1923)
- January 19 – Anna Manning Comfort, American physician (died 1931)
- February 15 – Elihu Root, statesman and diplomat, recipient of the Nobel Peace Prize in 1912 (died 1937)
- March 4 – Henry Clay Taylor, admiral (died 1904)
- March 20 – Lucy Myers Wright Mitchell, scholar of classical sculpture (born in Persia, died 1888)
- March 22 – John Banister Tabb, poet (died 1909)
- April 21 – William Healey Dall, malacologist and explorer (died 1927)
- May 14 – Charles J. Train, admiral (died 1906)
- May 18 – John B. Allen, U.S. Senator from Washington from 1889 to 1893 (died 1903)
- June 13 – Effie Germon, actress and singer (died 1914)
- July 4 – Edmonia Lewis, African American sculptor (died 1907 in Europe)
- July 19 – Horatio Nelson Young, naval hero (died 1913)
- August 27 – Martha Capps Oliver, poet and hymnwriter (died 1917)
- September 9 – Warner B. Bayley, admiral (died 1928)
- September 17 – Calvin S. Brice, U.S. Senator from Ohio from 1891 to 1897 (died 1898)
- October 13 – Charles Stockton, admiral (died 1924)
- October 17 – John J. Gardner, politician (died 1921)
- October 21 – Will Carleton, poet (died 1912)
- November 3 – Edward Douglass White, 9th Chief Justice of the United States from 1910 to 1921, Associate Justice of the U.S. Supreme Court from 1894 to 1910, and U.S. Senator from Louisiana from 1891 to 1894 (died 1921)
- November 9 – Elizabeth Reed, resident of Macon, Georgia, subject of The Allman Brothers Band song "In Memory of Elizabeth Reed" (died 1885)
- November 18 – Edwin Winter, railroad manager (died 1930)

== Deaths ==
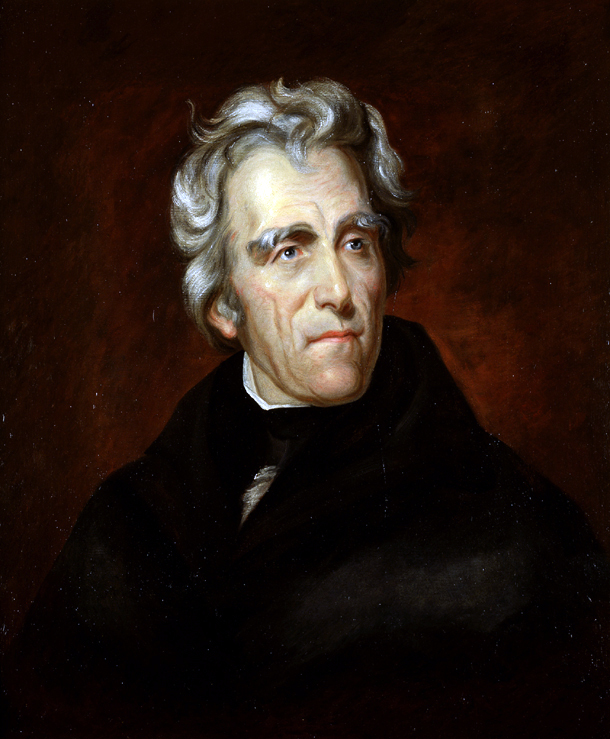
Andrew Jackson

- March 16 – Isaac C. Bates, U.S. Senator from Massachusetts from 1841 to 1845 (born 1779)
- March 18 – Johnny Appleseed, nurseryman and pioneer (born 1774)
- April 10 – Thomas Sewall, anatomist (born 1786)
- June 8 – Andrew Jackson, 7th President of the United States (born 1767)
- September 10 – Joseph Story, Associate Justice of the U.S. Supreme Court Justice from 1811 to 1845 (born 1779)
- November 11 – Maria Gowen Brooks, poet (born c. 1794, died in Cuba)

== See also ==
- Timeline of United States history (1820–1859)
