= 1904 in the United States =

- Decades: 1880s; 1890s; 1900s; 1910s; 1920s
- See also: History of the United States (1865–1918); Timeline of United States history (1900–1929); List of years in the United States

Events from the year 1904 in the United States.

== Incumbents ==
=== Federal government ===
- President: Theodore Roosevelt (R-New York)
- Vice President: vacant
- Chief Justice: Melville Fuller (Illinois)
- Speaker of the House of Representatives: Joseph Gurney Cannon (R–Illinois)
- Congress: 58th

==== State governments ====
Governors and lieutenant governors

=== Governors ===
- Governor of Alabama: William D. Jelks (Democratic)
- Governor of Arkansas: Jeff Davis (Democratic)
- Governor of California: George Pardee (Republican)
- Governor of Colorado: James Hamilton Peabody (Republican)
- Governor of Connecticut: Abiram Chamberlain (Republican)
- Governor of Delaware: John Hunn (Republican)
- Governor of Florida: William Sherman Jennings (Democratic)
- Governor of Georgia: Joseph M. Terrell (Democratic)
- Governor of Idaho: John T. Morrison (Republican)
- Governor of Illinois: Richard Yates, Jr. (Republican)
- Governor of Indiana: Winfield T. Durbin (Republican)
- Governor of Iowa: Albert B. Cummins (Republican)
- Governor of Kansas: Willis J. Bailey (Republican)
- Governor of Kentucky: J. C. W. Beckham (Democratic)
- Governor of Louisiana: William Wright Heard (Democratic) (until May 10), Newton Crain Blanchard (Democratic) (starting May 10)
- Governor of Maine: John Fremont Hill (Republican)
- Governor of Maryland: John Walter Smith (Democratic) (until January 13), Edwin Warfield (Democratic) (starting January 13)
- Governor of Massachusetts: John L. Bates (Republican)
- Governor of Michigan: Aaron T. Bliss (Republican)
- Governor of Minnesota: Samuel Rinnah Van Sant (Republican)
- Governor of Mississippi: Andrew H. Longino (Democratic) (until January 19), James K. Vardaman (Democratic) (starting January 19)
- Governor of Missouri: Alexander Monroe Dockery (Democratic)
- Governor of Montana: Joseph Toole (Democratic)
- Governor of Nebraska: John H. Mickey (Republican)
- Governor of Nevada: John Sparks (Silver)
- Governor of New Hampshire: Nahum J. Bachelder (Republican)
- Governor of New Jersey: Franklin Murphy (Republican)
- Governor of New York: Benjamin Barker Odell, Jr. (Republican) (until end of December 31)
- Governor of North Carolina: Charles Brantley Aycock (Democratic)
- Governor of North Dakota: Frank White (Republican)
- Governor of Ohio: George K. Nash (Republican) (until January 11), Myron T. Herrick (Republican) (starting January 11)
- Governor of Oregon: George Chamberlain (Democratic)
- Governor of Pennsylvania: Samuel W. Pennypacker (Republican)
- Governor of Rhode Island: Lucius F. C. Garvin (Democratic)
- Governor of South Carolina: Duncan Clinch Heyward (Democratic)
- Governor of South Dakota: Charles N. Herreid (Republican)
- Governor of Tennessee: James B. Frazier (Democratic)
- Governor of Texas: S. W. T. Lanham (Democratic)
- Governor of Utah: Heber Manning Wells (Republican)
- Governor of Vermont: John G. McCullough (Republican) (until October 6), Charles J. Bell (Republican) (starting October 6)
- Governor of Virginia: Andrew Jackson Montague (Democratic)
- Governor of Washington: Henry McBride (Republican)
- Governor of West Virginia: Albert B. White (Republican)
- Governor of Wisconsin: Robert M. La Follette, Sr. (Republican)
- Governor of Wyoming: Fenimore Chatterton (Republican)

=== Lieutenant governors ===
- Lieutenant Governor of Alabama: Russell M. Cunningham (Democratic)
- Lieutenant Governor of California: Alden Anderson (Republican)
- Lieutenant Governor of Colorado: Warren A. Haggott (Republican)
- Lieutenant Governor of Connecticut: Henry Roberts (Republican)
- Lieutenant Governor of Delaware: Philip L. Cannon (Republican)
- Lieutenant Governor of Idaho: James M. Stevens (Republican)
- Lieutenant Governor of Illinois: William Northcott (Republican)
- Lieutenant Governor of Indiana: Newton W. Gilbert (Republican)
- Lieutenant Governor of Iowa: John Herriott (Republican)
- Lieutenant Governor of Kansas: David J. Hanna (Republican)
- Lieutenant Governor of Kentucky: William P. Thorne (Democratic)
- Lieutenant Governor of Louisiana: Albert Estopinal (Democratic) (until May 10), Jared Y. Sanders, Sr. (Democratic) (starting May 10)
- Lieutenant Governor of Massachusetts: Curtis Guild, Jr. (Republican)
- Lieutenant Governor of Michigan: Alexander Maitland (Republican)
- Lieutenant Governor of Minnesota: Ray W. Jones (Republican)
- Lieutenant Governor of Mississippi: James T. Harrison (Democratic) (until month and day unknown), John Prentiss Carter (Democratic) (starting month and day unknown)
- Lieutenant Governor of Missouri: Thomas Lewis Rubey (Democratic)
- Lieutenant Governor of Montana: Frank G. Higgins (Democratic)
- Lieutenant Governor of Nebraska: Edmund G. McGilton (Republican)
- Lieutenant Governor of Nevada: Lemuel Allen (political party unknown)
- Lieutenant Governor of New York: Frank W. Higgins (Republican) (until end of December 31)
- Lieutenant Governor of North Carolina: Wilfred D. Turner (Democratic)
- Lieutenant Governor of North Dakota: David Bartlett (Republican)
- Lieutenant Governor of Ohio: Harry L. Gordon (Republican) (until January 11), Warren G. Harding (Republican) (starting January 11)
- Lieutenant Governor of Pennsylvania: William M. Brown (Republican)
- Lieutenant Governor of Rhode Island: Adelard Archambault (Democratic) (until month and day unknown), George H. Utter (Republican) (starting month and day unknown)
- Lieutenant Governor of South Carolina: John Sloan (Democratic)
- Lieutenant Governor of South Dakota: George W. Snow (Republican)
- Lieutenant Governor of Tennessee: E. T. Seay (Democratic)
- Lieutenant Governor of Texas: George D. Neal (Democratic)
- Lieutenant Governor of Vermont: Zed S. Stanton (Republican) (until October 6), Charles H. Stearns (Republican) (starting October 6)
- Lieutenant Governor of Virginia: Joseph Edward Willard (Democratic)
- Lieutenant Governor of Washington: vacant
- Lieutenant Governor of Wisconsin: James O. Davidson (Republican)

== Events ==
=== January–March ===
- January 2 – The first large-scale bodybuilding competition in America concludes at Madison Square Garden in New York City.
- January 8 – The Blackstone Library is dedicated, marking the beginning of the Chicago Public Library system.
- January 12 – Henry Ford sets a new automobile land speed record of 91.371 miles per hour (147.047 km/h).
- February 7 – The Great Baltimore Fire in Baltimore, Maryland destroys over 1,500 buildings in 30 hours.
- February 23 – For $10 million, the United States gains control of the Panama Canal Zone.
- February 26 – The Wisconsin State Capitol, in Madison, Wisconsin, is almost entirely destroyed by fire after a gas jet ignites the newly varnished ceiling.

=== April–June ===
- April 6 – Joseph F. Smith announces the Second Manifesto in General Conference of the Church of Jesus Christ of Latter-day Saints in Utah Territory, prohibiting the practice of polygamy, which has continued to be sanctioned by some of its leaders in violation of the 1890 Manifesto officially banning the practice.
- April 8 – Longacre Square in Midtown Manhattan is renamed Times Square after The New York Times.
- April 30 – The Louisiana Purchase Exposition World's Fair opens in St. Louis, Missouri (closes December 1).
- May 4 – U.S. Army engineers begin work on the Panama Canal.
- May 5 – Pitching against the Philadelphia Athletics, Cy Young of the Boston Americans throws the first perfect game in the modern era of baseball.
- May 30 – Alpha Gamma Delta sorority is founded at Syracuse University in Syracuse, New York.
- June 15 – A fire aboard the steamboat General Slocum in New York City's East River kills 1,021.

=== July–September ===
- July 1 – The third Modern Olympic Games opens in St. Louis, Missouri.
- July 23 – In St. Louis, Missouri, the ice cream cone is invented during the Louisiana Purchase Exposition.
- August 7 – Eden train wreck in Colorado: a bridge is washed away by a flash flood as a train crosses, resulting in at least 88 deaths.
- September – Stuyvesant High School opens in New York City as Manhattan's first manual trade school for boys.
- September 24 – New Market train wreck in Tennessee: two trains collide head-on at speed, resulting in at least 56 deaths.

=== October–December ===
- October – The Daytona Educational and Industrial Training School for Negro Girls, predecessor of Bethune–Cookman University, is opened in Florida by Mary McLeod Bethune.
- October 1 – Phi Delta Epsilon, the international medical fraternity, is founded by Aaron Brown and eight of his friends at Cornell University Medical College.
- October 5 – Alpha Kappa Psi, the co-ed Professional Business fraternity, is founded on the campus of New York University.
- October 10 – The opera The Sho-Gun, authored by George Ade and Gustav Luders and produced by Henry W. Savage, premieres at Wallack's Theatre in New York City, New York.
- October 15 – Theta Tau, the Professional Engineering Fraternity, is founded at the University of Minnesota in Minneapolis, Minnesota.
- October 17 – Amadeo Giannini founds the Bank of Italy in San Francisco, predecessor of the Bank of America.
- October 19 – Polytechnic University of the Philippines is founded as Manila Business School through the superintendence of the American Gabriel A. O'Reilly.
- October 27 – The first underground line of the New York City Subway opens.
- November 8 – 1904 United States presidential election: Republican incumbent Theodore Roosevelt defeats Democrat Alton B. Parker.
- November 23 – The Olympic Games end.
- November 24 – A continuous track tractor is successfully demonstrated by the Holt Manufacturing Company.
- December 10 – The Pi Kappa Phi fraternity is founded at the College of Charleston in South Carolina.
- December 30 – The East Boston Tunnel opens, for streetcars.
- December 31 – In New York City, the first New Year's Eve celebration is held in Times Square.

=== Undated ===
- St. Bernard's School is founded in New York City on Manhattan.

=== Ongoing ===
- Progressive Era (1890s–1920s)
- Lochner era (c. 1897–c. 1937)
- Black Patch Tobacco Wars (1904–1909)

== Births ==
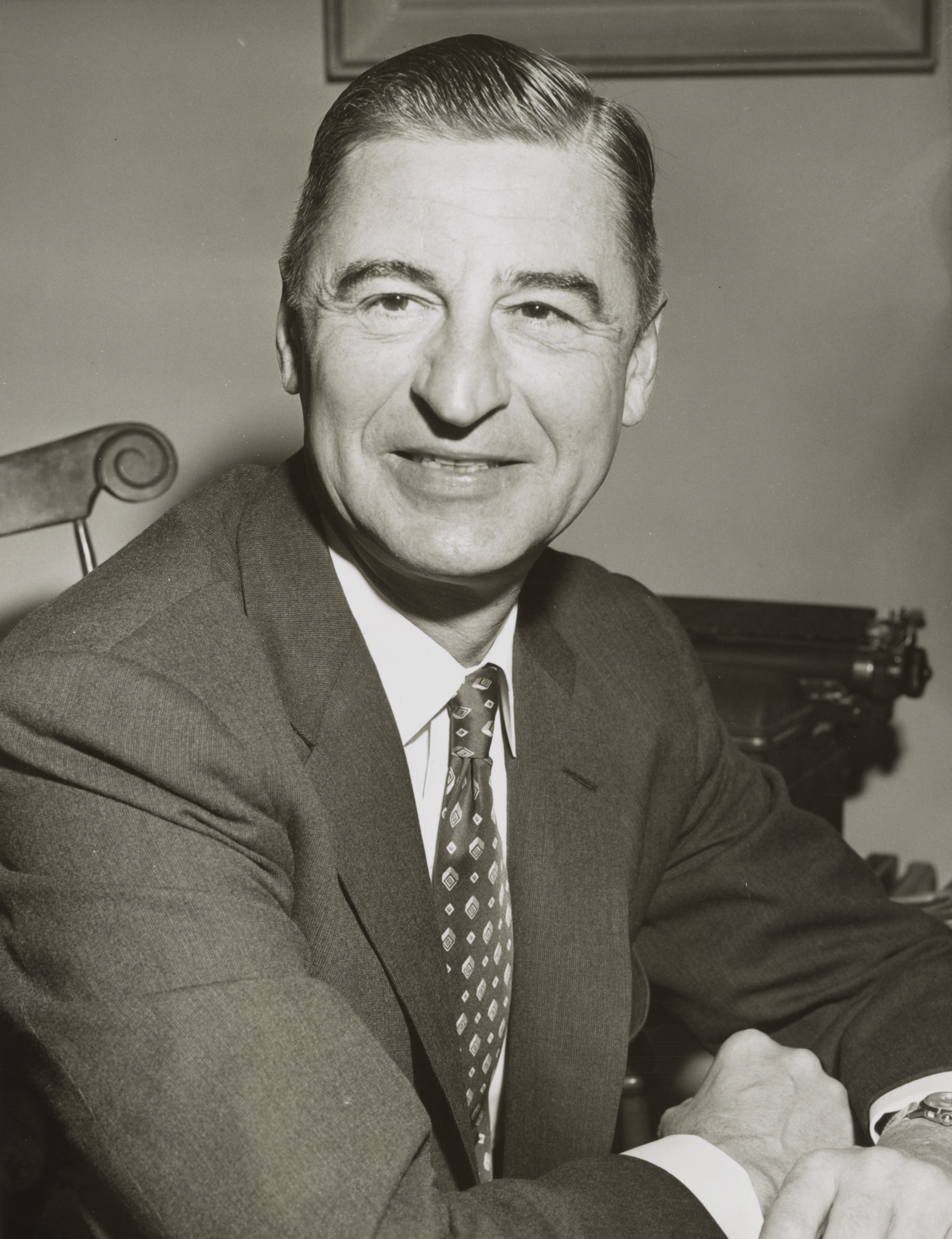
Dr.Seuss

- January 5 – Jeane Dixon, astrologer (died 1997)
- January 10 – Ray Bolger, actor, singer and dancer, best known for his role in The Wizard of Oz (died 1987)
- January 19 – Leo Soileau, Cajun musician (died 1980)
- January 21 – Edris Rice-Wray Carson, medical researcher (died 1990)
- January 26 – Ancel Keys, nutritionist (died 2004)
- February 3 – Pretty Boy Floyd, bank robber (shot 1934)
- February 13 – Erwin Canham, journalist (died 1982)
- February 16 –
  - George F. Kennan, political adviser (died 2005)
  - James Baskett, actor (died 1948)
- March 1
  - Paul Hartman, actor and dancer (died 1973)
  - Glenn Miller, bandleader (died 1944)
- March 2 – Dr. Seuss, children's author (The Cat in the Hat) (died 1991)
- March 4 – Chief Tahachee, writer and actor (died 1978)
- March 20
  - Frank Mills, politician in Ohio legislature (died 1969)
  - B. F. Skinner, behavioral psychologist (died 1990)
- March 23 (possible year) – Joan Crawford, actress (died 1977)
- March 26 – Joseph Campbell, author on mythology (died 1987)
- April 6 – William Challee, actor (died 1989)
- April 9 – Sharkey Bonano, jazz musician (died 1972)
- April 12 – Glen H. Taylor, U.S. Senator from Idaho from 1945 to 1951 (died 1984)
- April 18 – Pigmeat Markham, African American entertainer (died 1981)
- April 20 – Bob Bartlett, U.S. Senator from Alaska from 1959 to 1968 (died 1968)
- April 22 – J. Robert Oppenheimer, physicist (died 1967)
- April 27 – Syd Nathan, record producer, music industry executive and founder of King Records (died 1968)
- May 10 – James Roy Andersen, general (died 1945)
- May 17 – John J. Williams, U.S. Senator from Delaware from 1947 to 1970 (died 1988)
- May 21
  - Robert Montgomery, actor and director (died 1981)
  - Fats Waller, African American jazz pianist and entertainer (died 1943)
- May 30 – Doris Packer, actress (died 1979)
- June 2 – Johnny Weissmuller, swimmer and actor (Tarzan) (died 1984)
- June 3 – Charles R. Drew, African American physician, pioneer in blood transfusion (died 1950)
- June 12
  - Bill Cox, athlete (died 1996)
  - Johnny Murray, voice actor (died 1956)
- June 21 – Orian Landreth, American football coach (died 1996)
- June 22 – William O. Gallery, admiral (died 1981)
- June 24 – Phil Harris, bandleader and comic actor (died 1995)
- June 26 – Virginia Brown Faire, actress (died 1980)
- July 1 – Mary Calderone, physician and public health advocate (died 1998)
- July 5 – Eugenia Clinchard, child actress (died 1989)
- July 8 – Nick Connor, politician (died 1995)
- July 15 – Dorothy Fields, librettist (died 1974)
- July 16 – Geraldine Knight Scott, landscape architect (died 1989)
- August 13 – Charles "Buddy" Rogers, actor and jazz musician (died 1999)
- August 16 – Wendell Meredith Stanley, chemist, recipient of the Nobel Prize in Chemistry in 1946 (died 1971)
- August 17 – Mary Cain, newspaper editor and politician (died 1984)
- August 21 – Count Basie, African American jazz bandleader (died 1984)
- August 22 – Jay Novello, actor (died 1982)
- August 26 – Georgia Schmidt, actress (died 1997)
- September 12 – Lou Moore, race car driver and team owner (died 1956)
- September 19 – Elvia Allman, actress (died 1992)
- October 1 – Irene Craigmile Bolam, Amelia Earhart look-alike/believed alias (died 1982)
- October 3 – Charles J. Pedersen, chemist, recipient of the Nobel Prize in Chemistry in 1987 (died 1989)
- October 8 – Wally Brown, actor and comedian (died 1961)
- October 12 – Anthony F. DePalma, orthopedic surgeon and professor (died 2005)
- October 23 – Harvey Penick, golfer (died 1995)
- November 1 – Laura La Plante, silent film actress (died 1996)
- November 17 – Isamu Noguchi, sculptor (died 1988)
- November 18 – William H. Brockman Jr., United States Navy admiral (died 1979)
- November 25 – Lillian Copeland, Olympic field athlete (died 1964)
- December 7 – Clarence Nash, voice actor (died 1985)
- December 18 – George Stevens, film director (died 1975)
- December 19 – Benjamin W. Fortson Jr, politician, Georgia Secretary of State (died 1979)
- December 25 – Flemmie Pansy Kittrell, nutritionist (died 1980)
- December 30 – David M. Shoup, general (died 1983)
- Full date unknown
  - E. Gifford Upjohn, American business executive (died 1993)

== Deaths ==
- January 2 – James Longstreet, one of the foremost Confederate generals of the American Civil War (born 1821)
- January 6 – Julia Anna Orum, educator, lecturer, and author (born 1843
- January 9 – John Brown Gordon, U.S. Senator from Georgia from 1873 to 1880 and from 1891 to 1897 (born 1832)
- January 20 – Maria Louisa Bustill, schoolteacher, mother of Paul Robeson (born 1853)
- February 9 – Mary Abbott, golfer (born 1857)
- February 15 – Mark Hanna, U.S. Senator from Ohio (born 1837)
- March 17 – William Elbridge Sewell, naval officer and Governor of Guam (born 1851)
- June 5 – Olivia Langdon Clemens, editor (born 1845)
- June 28 – Dan Emmett, founder of the Virginia Minstrels (born 1815)
- July 26 – Henry Clay Taylor, admiral (born 1845)
- August 16 – Colonel Prentiss Ingraham, author of dime fiction (born 1843)
- August 22 – Kate Chopin, fiction writer (born 1850)
- October 11 – Trumbull Stickney, classicist and poet (born 1874)
- December 21 – George L. Shoup, U.S. Senator from Idaho from 1890 to 1901 (born 1836)
- Little Joe Monahan, transgender rancher (born 1850)

== See also ==
- List of American films of 1904
- Timeline of United States history (1900–1929)
