= 1850 in the United States =

- Decades: 1830s; 1840s; 1850s; 1860s; 1870s
- See also: History of the United States (1849–1865); Timeline of United States history (1820–1859); List of years in the United States

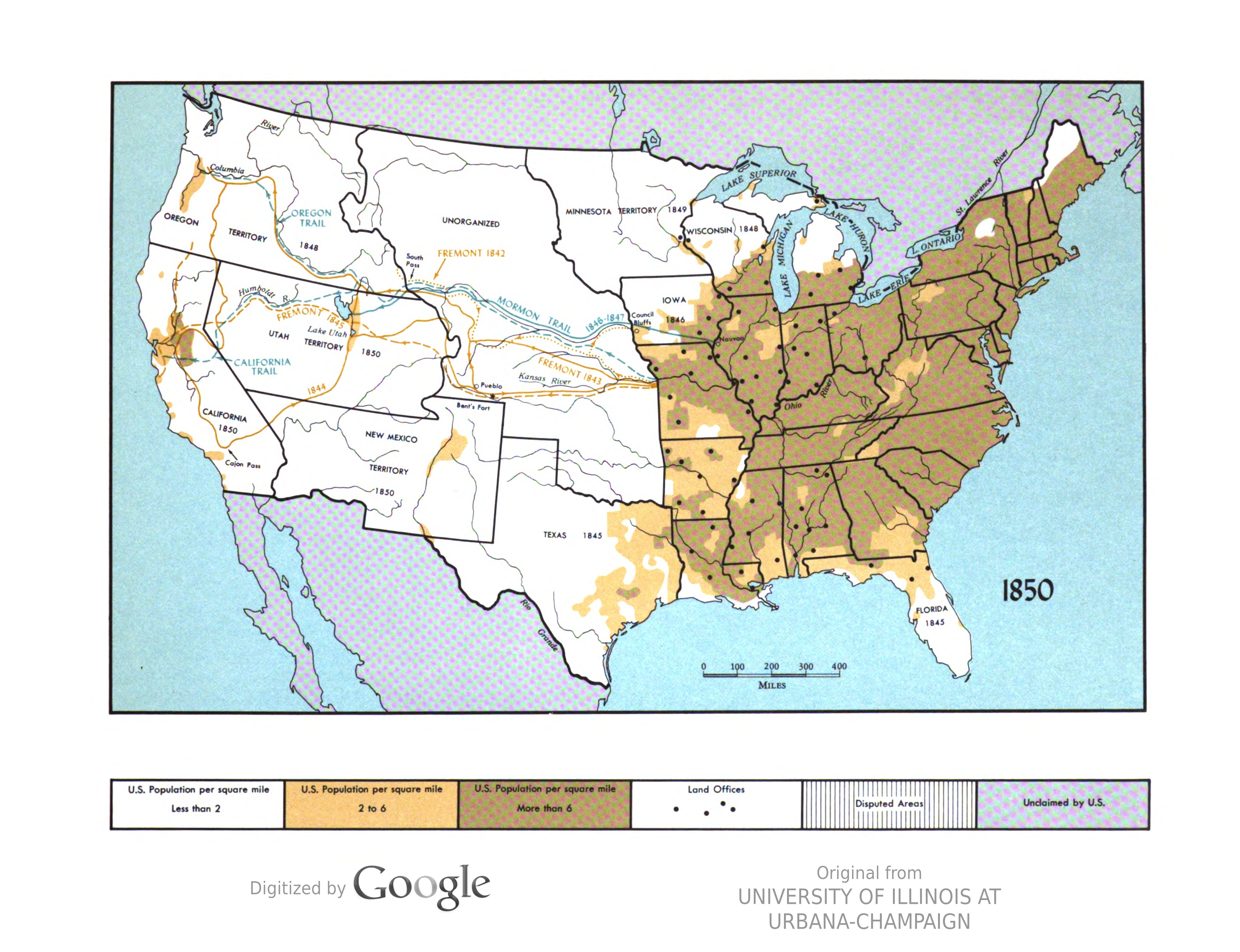
1850 in the United States

Events from the year 1850 in the United States.

== Incumbents ==
=== Federal government ===
- President:

Zachary Taylor (W-Kentucky) (until July 9)
Millard Fillmore (W-New York) (starting July 9)

- Vice President:

Millard Fillmore (W-New York) (until July 9)
vacant (starting July 9)

- Chief Justice: Roger B. Taney (Maryland)
- Speaker of the House of Representatives: Howell Cobb (D-Georgia)
- Congress: 31st

==== State governments ====
Governors and lieutenant governors

=== Governors ===
- Governor of Alabama: Henry W. Collier (Democratic)
- Governor of Arkansas: John Selden Roane (Democratic)
- Governor of California: Peter Hardeman Burnett (Democratic) (starting September 9)
- Governor of Connecticut: Joseph Trumbull (Whig) (until May 4), Thomas H. Seymour (Democratic) (starting May 4)
- Governor of Delaware: William Tharp (Democratic)
- Governor of Florida: Thomas Brown (Whig)
- Governor of Georgia: George W. Towns (Democratic)
- Governor of Illinois: Augustus C. French (Democratic)
- Governor of Indiana: Joseph A. Wright (Democratic)
- Governor of Iowa: Ansel Briggs (Democratic) (until December 4), Stephen P. Hempstead (Democratic) (starting December 4)
- Governor of Kentucky: John J. Crittenden (Whig) (until July 13), John L. Helm (Democratic) (starting July 13)
- Governor of Louisiana: Isaac Johnson (Democratic) (until January 28), Joseph Marshall Walker (Democratic) (starting January 28)
- Governor of Maine: John W. Dana (Democratic) (until May 8), John Hubbard (Democratic) (starting May 8)
- Governor of Maryland: Philip F. Thomas (Democratic)
- Governor of Massachusetts: George N. Briggs (Democratic)
- Governor of Michigan: Epaphroditus Ransom (Democratic) (until January 7), John S. Barry (Democratic) (starting January 7)
- Governor of Mississippi: Joseph W. Matthews (Democratic) (until January 10), John A. Quitman (Democratic) (starting January 10)
- Governor of Missouri: Austin Augustus King (Democratic)
- Governor of New Hampshire: Samuel Dinsmoor, Jr. (Democratic)
- Governor of New Jersey: Daniel Haines (Democratic)
- Governor of New York: Hamilton Fish (Whig) (until end of December 31)
- Governor of North Carolina: Charles Manly (Whig)
- Governor of Ohio: Seabury Ford (Whig) (until December 12), Reuben Wood (Democratic) (starting December 12)
- Governor of Pennsylvania: William F. Johnston (Whig)
- Governor of Rhode Island: Henry B. Anthony (Whig)
- Governor of South Carolina: Whitemarsh B. Seabrook (Democratic) (until December 13), John Hugh Means (Democratic) (starting December 13)
- Governor of Tennessee: William Trousdale (Democratic)
- Governor of Texas: Peter Hansborough Bell (Democratic)
- Governor of Vermont: Carlos Coolidge (Whig) (until October 11), Charles K. Williams (Whig) (starting October 11)
- Governor of Virginia: John B. Floyd (Democratic)
- Governor of Wisconsin: Nelson Dewey (Democratic)

=== Lieutenant governors ===
- Lieutenant Governor of California: John McDougall (Democratic)
- Lieutenant Governor of Connecticut: Thomas Backus (Democratic) (until May 4), Charles H. Pond (Democratic) (starting May 4)
- Lieutenant Governor of Illinois: William McMurtry (Democratic)
- Lieutenant Governor of Indiana: James H. Lane (Democratic)
- Lieutenant Governor of Kentucky: John LaRue Helm (Whig) (until July 31), vacant (starting July 31)
- Lieutenant Governor of Louisiana: Trasimond Landry (Whig) (until January 28), Jean Baptiste Plauche (Whig) (starting January 28)
- Lieutenant Governor of Massachusetts: John Reed, Jr. (political party unknown)
- Lieutenant Governor of Michigan: William M. Fenton (Democratic)
- Lieutenant Governor of Missouri: Thomas Lawson Price (Democratic)
- Lieutenant Governor of New York: George W. Patterson (Whig) (until end of December 31)
- Lieutenant Governor of Rhode Island: Thomas Whipple (political party unknown)
- Lieutenant Governor of South Carolina: William Henry Gist (Democratic) (until December 13), Joshua John Ward (Democratic) (starting December 13)
- Lieutenant Governor of Texas: John Alexander Greer (Democratic)
- Lieutenant Governor of Vermont: Robert Pierpoint (Whig) (until October 11), Julius Converse (Whig) (starting October 11)
- Lieutenant Governor of Wisconsin: John E. Holmes (Democratic) (until January 7), Samuel W. Beall (Democratic) (starting January 7)

== Events ==
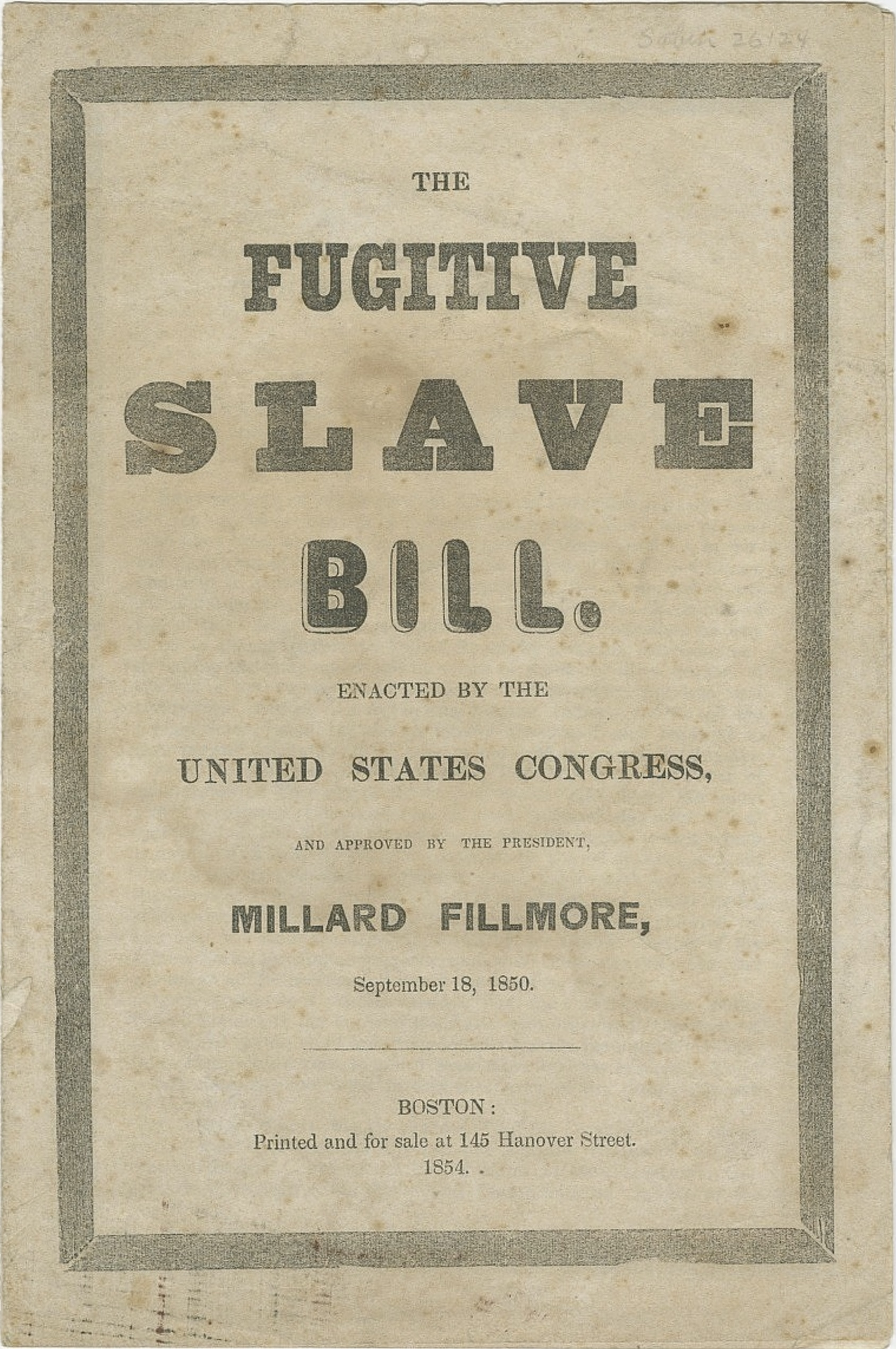
This printing of the Fugitive Slave Act of 1850 was sponsored by anti-slavery groups as a protest against the new law that required local and state authorities to assist slave owners in retrieving slaves

=== January–March ===
- January – Sacramento floods.
- January 29 – Henry Clay introduces the Compromise of 1850 to Congress.
- January 31 – The University of Rochester is chartered in Rochester, New York; it admits its first students in November
- c. January–February – The Liberty Head double eagle first issued for commerce.
- February 8–17 – Battle at Fort Utah: The Nauvoo Legion kills Timpanogos hostile to the Mormon settlement at Fort Utah on the orders of Brigham Young.
- February 28 – The University of Utah opens in Salt Lake City.
- March 7 – United States Senator Daniel Webster gives his "Seventh of March" speech, in which he endorses the Compromise of 1850, in order to prevent a possible civil war.
- March 16 – Nathaniel Hawthorne's historical novel The Scarlet Letter is published in Boston, Massachusetts.
- March 19 – American Express is founded by Henry Wells and William Fargo.

=== April–June ===
- April 4 – Los Angeles is incorporated as a city in California.
- April 15 – San Francisco is incorporated as a city in California.
- April 19 – Clayton–Bulwer Treaty is signed by the United States and Great Britain, allowing both countries to share Nicaragua and not claim complete control over the proposed Nicaragua Canal.
- May 7 – The brigantine USS Advance is loaned to the United States Navy.
- May 23 – The USS Advance puts to sea from New York City to search for Franklin's lost expedition in the Arctic.
- June – Harper's Magazine published as a new monthly in New York City.
- June 1 – The 1850 United States census shows that 11.2% of the population classed as "Negro" are of mixed race.
- June 3 – Traditional date of Kansas City, Missouri's founding: it is incorporated by Jackson County, Missouri as the "Town of Kansas".

=== July–September ===
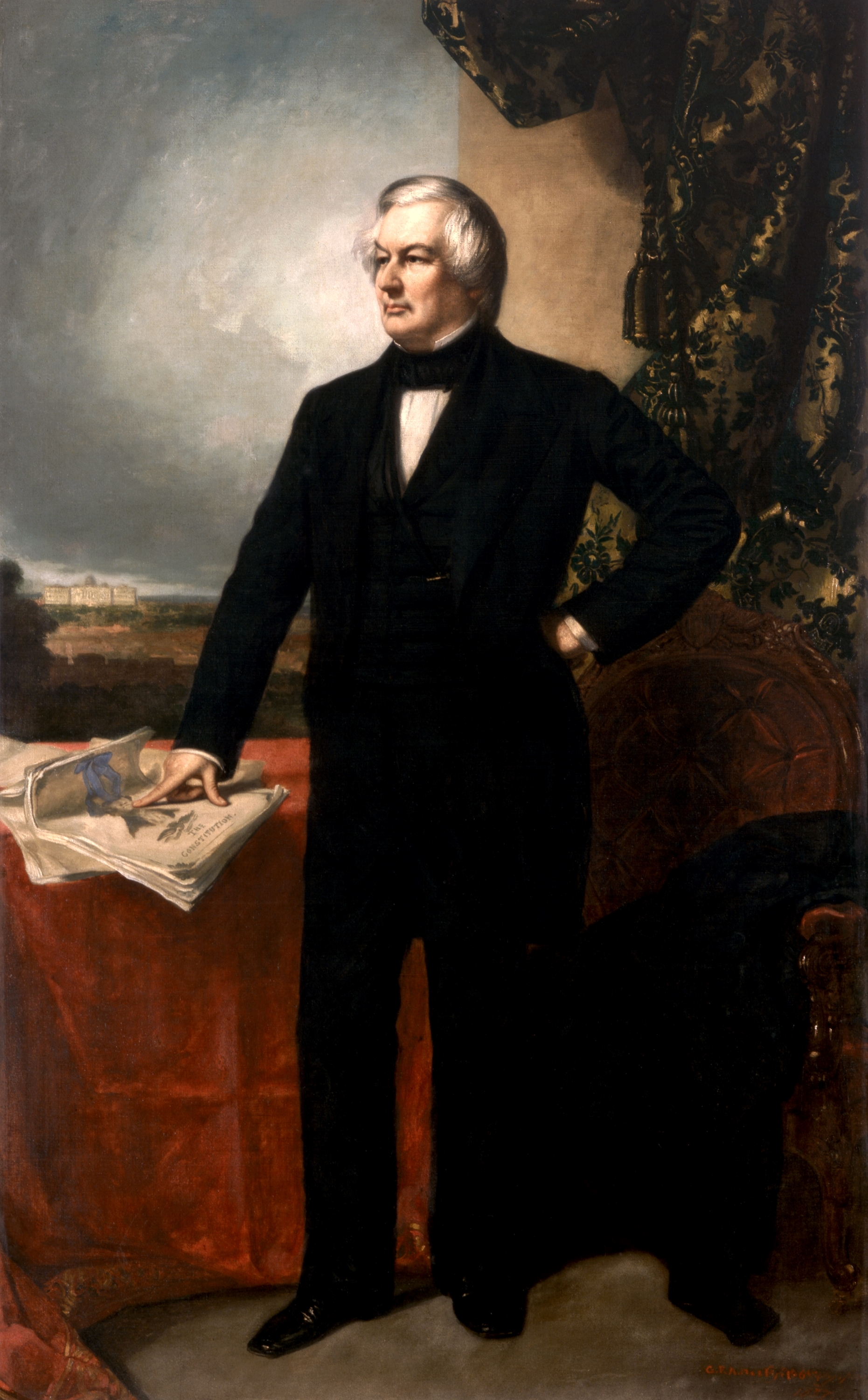
July 9: Vice President Millard Fillmore becomes the 13th U.S. president with the death of President Taylor

- July 1 – St. Mary's Institute (the future University of Dayton) admits its first pupils in Dayton, Ohio.
- July 9 – President Zachary Taylor dies in office; Vice President Millard Fillmore becomes the 13th president of the United States the next day.
- July 14 – John Gorrie makes the first public demonstration of his ice-making machine, in Apalachicola, Florida.
- September 9
  - California is admitted to the Union as the 31st state (see History of California and An Act for the Admission of the State of California).
  - Utah Territory is established.
  - New Mexico Territory is organized by order of the U.S. Congress.
- September 18 – The Fugitive Slave Act of 1850 is passed by the U.S. Congress, requiring Northerners to capture runaway slaves.

=== October–December ===
- October 19 – Phi Kappa Sigma International Fraternity founded at the University of Pennsylvania.
- October 28 – Delegate Edward Ralph May delivers a speech on behalf of African American suffrage to the Indiana Constitutional Convention.
- December 16 – Steamer South America burns on the Mississippi River in Louisiana; 27 killed including 13 U.S. Army recruits from Newport Barracks in Kentucky

=== Undated ===
- The American system of watch manufacturing starts in Roxbury, Massachusetts, with the Waltham Watch Company.
- Mayer Lehman arrives from Germany to join his siblings in Lehman Brothers merchant business in Montgomery, Alabama.
- Allan Pinkerton forms the North-Western Police Agency, later the Pinkerton National Detective Agency, in Chicago.
- Astronomer Maria Mitchell becomes the first woman member of the American Association for the Advancement of Science.
- The temperance organization, International Organisation of Good Templars, is established in Utica, New York, as the order of the Knights of Jericho.
- One of the original segments of the historic Pacific Highway in Washington (state) in Clark and Cowlitz counties is established.

=== Ongoing ===
- California gold rush (1848–1855)

== Births ==
- January 1 – John Barclay Armstrong, Texas Ranger lieutenant and a U.S. Marshal (died 1913)
- January 10 – John Wellborn Root, Chicago architect (died 1891)
- January 18 – Seth Low, educator (died 1916)
- January 24 – Mary Noailles Murfree, novelist (died 1922)
- January 27 – Samuel Gompers, labor union leader (died 1924)
- January 28 – Edward Merritt Hughes, U.S. Navy officer (died 1903)
- February 1 – Emma Churchman Hewitt, author and journalist (died 1921)
- February 2 – Cassius Aurelius Boone, Mayor of Orlando and businessman (died 1917)
- February 6 – Elizabeth Williams Champney, author (died 1922)
- February 8
  - Kate Chopin, writer (died 1904)
  - Charles Rockwell Lanman, Sanskrit scholar (died 1941)
- February 15 – Albert B. Cummins, U.S. Senator from Iowa from 1908 to 1926 (died 1926)
- February 27
  - Henry E. Huntington, railroad pioneer and art collector (died 1927)
  - Laura E. Richards, author (died 1943)
- March 9 – Daniel B. Towner, hymn composer (died 1919)
- March 26 – Edward Bellamy, Utopian novelist and socialist (died 1898)
- March 31 – Charles Doolittle Walcott, invertebrate paleontologist (died 1927)
- April 3 – Zina P. Young Card, Mormon leader and women's rights activist (died 1931)
- April 8
  - John Peters, baseball player (died 1924)
  - William H. Welch, physician, co-founder of Johns Hopkins Hospital and 1st dean of Johns Hopkins School of Medicine (died 1934)
- April 10 – Mary Emilie Holmes, geologist and educator (died 1906)
- April 11
  - Rosetta Luce Gilchrist, physician and author (died 1921)
  - Isidor Rayner, U.S. senator from Maryland from 1905 to 1912 (died 1912)
- April 18 – Joseph Labadie, labor organizer (died 1933)
- April 20 – Daniel Chester French, sculptor (died 1931)
- April 30
  - Ruth Alice Armstrong, temperance activist (died 1901)
  - Mrs. Alex. McVeigh Miller, novelist (died 1937)
- May 8 – Ross Barnes, baseball player and manager (died 1915)
- May 12 – Henry Cabot Lodge, statesman (died 1924)
- May 14 – Alva Adams, 3-time Governor of Colorado (died 1922)
- June 3 – Albert M. Todd, businessman and politician (died 1931)
- June 5 – Pat Garrett, bartender and sheriff (died 1908)
- June 15 – Charles Hazelius Sternberg, paleontologist (died 1943)
- June 18
  - Cyrus H. K. Curtis, magazine publisher (died 1933)
  - Alice Moore McComas, author, editor, lecturer and reformer (died 1919)
- June 21 – Daniel Carter Beard, Scouting pioneer (died 1941)
- July 2 – Robert Ridgway, ornithologist (died 1929)
- July 7 – William E. Mason, U.S. Senator from Illinois from 1897 to 1903 (died 1921)
- July 8 – Charles Rockwell Lanman, Sanskrit scholar (died 1941)
- July 11 – Annie Armstrong, Baptist leader (died 1938)
- July 12 – Newell Sanders, businessman and politician (died 1938)
- July 18 – Rose Hartwick Thorpe, poet (died 1939)
- July 20 – John G. Shedd, businessman (died 1926)
- July 25 – Lydia J. Newcomb Comings, educator (died 1946)
- July 28 – William Whittingham Lyman, vintner (died 1921)
- July 31 – Robert Love Taylor, Tennessee congressman (died 1912)
- August 28 – Charles H. Aldrich, Solicitor General of the U.S. (died 1929)
- September 2 – Eugene Field, poet and essayist (died 1895)
- September 6 – Marion Howard Brazier, journalist (died 1935)
- October 1
  - David R. Francis, politician (died 1927)
  - Thomas Vincent Welch, politician (died 1903)
- October 14 – Newton E. Mason, rear admiral (died 1945)
- October 30 – John Patton, Jr., U.S. Senator from Michigan from 1894 to 1895 (died 1907)
- November 5 – Ella Wheeler Wilcox, poet (died 1919)
- November 18 – John S. Armstrong, real estate developer (died 1908)
- December 9 – Emma Abbott, operatic soprano (died 1891)
- December 21 – William Wallace Lincoln, third son of Abraham Lincoln and Mary Todd Lincoln (died 1862)
- December 23 – Louise Reed Stowell, scientist and author (died 1932)
- December 25 – Florence Griswold, art curator (died 1937)

== Deaths ==
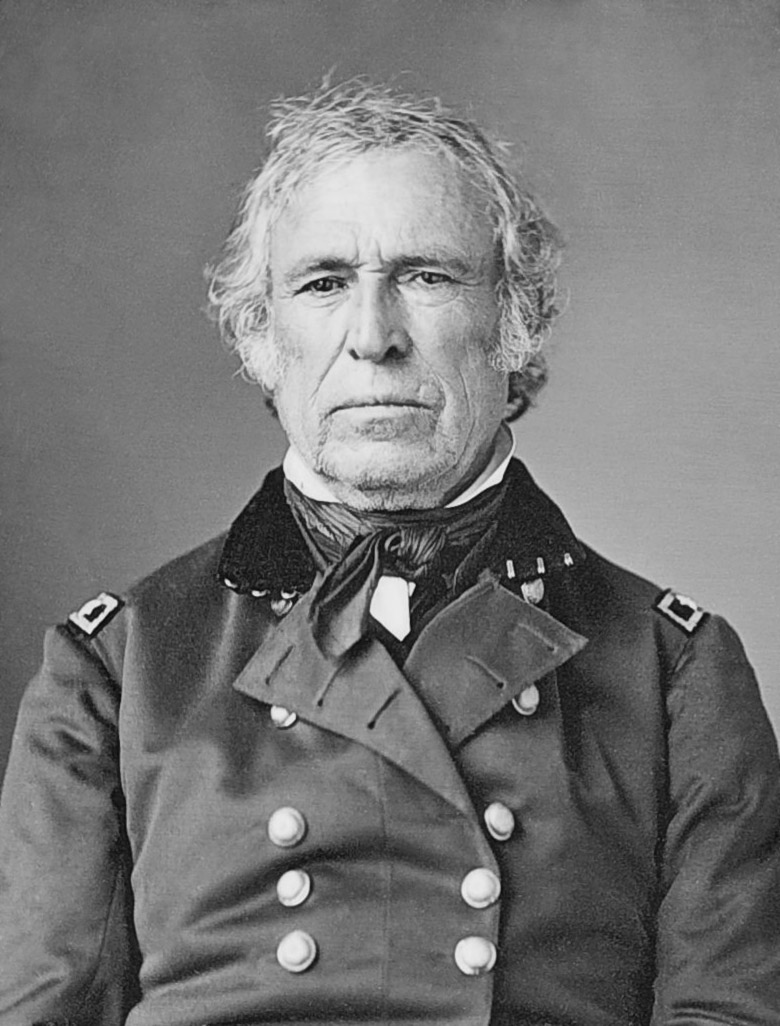
Zachary Taylor

- February 1 – Edward Baker Lincoln, second son of Abraham Lincoln (born 1846)
- March 3 – Oliver Cowdery, religious leader (born 1806)
- March 21 – Miguel Pedrorena, early settler of San Diego, California (born c. 1808)
- March 28 – Gerard Brandon, fourth and sixth governor of Mississippi from 1825 to 1826 and from 1826 to 1832 (born 1788)
- March 31 – John C. Calhoun, seventh vice president of the United States from 1825 to 1832 (born 1782)
- April 12 – Adoniram Judson, Congregationalist and later Baptist missionary (born 1788)
- April 24 – John Norvell, U.S. Senator from Michigan from 1837 to 1841 (born 1789)
- May 16 – William Hendricks, U.S. Senator from Indiana from 1825 to 1837 (born 1782)
- July 9 – Zachary Taylor, 12th president of the United States from 1849 to 1850 (born 1784)
- July 19 – Margaret Fuller, journalist, literary critic and women's rights advocate, presumed drowned (born 1810)
- November 19 – Richard Mentor Johnson, ninth vice president of the United States from 1837 to 1841, U.S. Senator from Kentucky from 1819 to 1829 (born 1780)

== See also ==
- Timeline of United States history (1820–1859)
