= 1842 in the United States =

- Decades: 1820s; 1830s; 1840s; 1850s; 1860s
- See also: History of the United States (1789–1849); Timeline of United States history (1820–1859); List of years in the United States

Events from the year 1842 in the United States.

== Incumbents ==
=== Federal government ===
- President: John Tyler (I-Virginia)
- Vice President: vacant
- Chief Justice: Roger B. Taney (Maryland)
- Speaker of the House of Representatives: John White (W-Kentucky)
- Congress: 27th

==== State governments ====
Governors and lieutenant governors

=== Governors ===
- Governor of Alabama: Benjamin Fitzpatrick (Democratic)
- Governor of Arkansas: Archibald Yell (Democratic)
- Governor of Connecticut: William W. Ellsworth (Whig) (until May 4), Chauncey Fitch Cleveland (Democratic) (starting May 4)
- Governor of Delaware: William B. Cooper (Whig)
- Governor of Georgia: Charles J. McDonald (Democratic)
- Governor of Illinois: Thomas Carlin (Democratic) (until December 8), Thomas Ford (Democratic) (starting December 8)
- Governor of Indiana: Samuel Bigger (Whig)
- Governor of Kentucky: Robert P. Letcher (Whig)
- Governor of Louisiana: André B. Roman (Whig)
- Governor of Maine: Edward Kent (Whig) (until January 5), John Fairfield (Democratic) (starting January 5)
- Governor of Maryland: William Grason (Democratic) (until January 3), Francis Thomas (Democratic) (starting January 3)
- Governor of Massachusetts: John Davis (Whig)
- Governor of Michigan: James Wright Gordon (Whig) (until January 3), John S. Barry (Democratic) (starting January 3)
- Governor of Mississippi: Alexander G. McNutt (Democratic) (until January 10), Tilghman Tucker (Democratic) (starting January 10)
- Governor of Missouri: Thomas Reynolds (Democratic)
- Governor of New Hampshire: John Page (Democratic) (until June 2), Henry Hubbard (Democratic) (starting June 2)
- Governor of New Jersey: William Pennington (Whig)
- Governor of New York: William H. Seward (Whig) (until end of December 31)
- Governor of North Carolina: John Motley Morehead (Whig)
- Governor of Ohio: Thomas Corwin (Whig) (until December 14), Wilson Shannon (Democratic) (starting December 14)
- Governor of Pennsylvania: David R. Porter (Democratic)
- Governor of Rhode Island: Samuel Ward King (Rhode Island)
- Governor of South Carolina: John Peter Richardson II (Democratic) (until December 8), James Henry Hammond (Democratic) (starting December 8)
- Governor of Tennessee: James C. Jones (Whig)
- Governor of Vermont: Charles Paine (Whig)
- Governor of Virginia: John Rutherfoord (Whig) (until March 31), John Munford Gregory (Whig) (starting March 31)

=== Lieutenant governors ===
- Lieutenant Governor of Connecticut: Charles Hawley (Whig) (until May 4), William S. Holabird (Democratic) (starting May 4)
- Lieutenant Governor of Illinois: Stinson Anderson (Democratic) (until December 8), John Moore (Democratic) (starting December 8)
- Lieutenant Governor of Indiana: Samuel Hall (Whig)
- Lieutenant Governor of Kentucky: Manlius Valerius Thomson (political party unknown)
- Lieutenant Governor of Massachusetts: George Hull (political party unknown)
- Lieutenant Governor of Michigan: Origen D. Richardson (Whig) (starting month and day unknown)
- Lieutenant Governor of Missouri: Meredith Miles Marmaduke (Democratic)
- Lieutenant Governor of New York: Luther Bradish (Whig) (until end of December 31)
- Lieutenant Governor of Rhode Island: Byron Diman (political party unknown) (until month and day unknown), Nathaniel Bullock (political party unknown) (starting month and day unknown)
- Lieutenant Governor of South Carolina: William K. Clowney (Democratic) (until December 8), Isaac Donnom Witherspoon (Democratic) (starting December 8)
- Lieutenant Governor of Vermont: Waitstill R. Ranney (Whig)

== Events ==
- February 1 – Willamette University is established in Salem, Oregon.
- March – Commonwealth v. Hunt: the Massachusetts Supreme Court makes strikes and unions legal in the United States.
- March 5 – Mexican troops led by Rafael Vasquez invade Texas, briefly occupy San Antonio, and then head back to the Rio Grande. This is the first such invasion since the Texas Revolution.
- March 9 – First documented discovery of gold in California, by Francisco Lopez at Placerita Canyon in Rancho San Francisco, sparking a small-scale gold rush, mainly of Mexicans from Sonora.
- May 19 – Dorr Rebellion: Militiamen supporting Thomas Wilson Dorr attack the arsenal in Providence, Rhode Island but are repulsed.
- August 1 – A parade in Philadelphia celebrating the end of slavery in the Caribbean is attacked by a mob, leading to the 3-day Lombard Street riot.
- August 4 – The Armed Occupation Act is signed, providing for the armed occupation and settlement of the unsettled part of the Peninsula of East Florida.
- August 9 – The Webster–Ashburton Treaty is signed, establishing the United States–Canada border east of the Rocky Mountains.
- September – Ohio Wesleyan University is established in Delaware, Ohio.
- November 26 – The University of Notre Dame in South Bend, Indiana is established by Father Edward Sorin of the Roman Catholic Congregation of Holy Cross.
- December 20 – The Citadel, The Military College of South Carolina is established.

=== Undated ===
- The Sons of Temperance is founded in New York City.
- Founding of:
  - Cumberland University (in Lebanon, Tennessee)
  - Hollins University (in Roanoke, Virginia by Charles Cocke)
  - Villanova University (in Villanova, Pennsylvania by the Augustinian order)
  - Indiana University Bloomington
  - Indiana University Maurer School of Law
  - The Merchants Fund organization in Philadelphia
- The Scroll and Key secret society of Yale University is established.

=== Ongoing ===
- Second Seminole War (1835–1842)

== Births ==
- January 11 – William James, psychologist and philosopher (died 1910)
- January 21 – Henry Livermore Abbott, Union Army major and brevet brigadier general (died 1864)
- February 3 – Sidney Lanier, musician, poet and writer (died 1881)
- February 28 – Stephen Wallace Dorsey, U.S. Senator from Arkansas from 1873 to 1879 (died 1916)
- March 30 – John Fiske, philosopher (died 1901)
- June 16 – David Herold, accomplice of John Wilkes Booth (died 1865)
- June 24 – Ambrose Bierce, writer and satirist (died c. 1914 in Mexican Revolution)
- July 9 – Mary E. Smith Hayward, businesswoman and suffragist (died 1938)
- July 15 – James Hard, last verified living Union combat veteran of the American Civil War (died 1953)
- July 30 – Thomas J. O'Brien, politician and diplomat (died 1933)
- August 31 – Josephine St. Pierre Ruffin, African American civil rights campaigner and publisher (died 1924)
- September 13 – John H. Bankhead, U.S. Senator from Alabama from 1907 to 1920 (died 1920)
- October 3 – Frederick Rodgers, admiral (died 1917)
- October 14 – Joe Start, baseball first baseman (died 1927)
- October 28 – Anna Elizabeth Dickinson, orator (died 1932)
- December 15 – George Keller, architect (died 1935)
- Unknown – George Truesdell, businessman (died 1921)

== Deaths ==
- January 4 – John W. Beschter, Jesuit priest and academic (born 1763 in Luxembourg)
- March 4 – James Forten, African American abolitionist and businessman (born 1766)
- March 13 – Samuel Eells, founder of Alpha Delta Phi fraternity (born 1810)
- March 15 – Wapello, a peace chief of the Meskwaki (Fox people)
- June 17 – Carey A. Harris, Indian Affairs commissioner during Indian Removal (born 1806)
- July 23 – Timothy Swan, psalmist and hatter (born 1758)
- September 10 – Letitia Tyler, First Lady of the United States from 1841 to 1842 as wife of the 10th U.S. president, John Tyler (born 1790)
- October 2 – William Ellery Channing, Unitarian theologian and minister (born 1780)
- November 3 – Robert Smith, 6th United States Secretary of State (born 1757)
- December 1 – Philip Spencer, founder of Chi Psi fraternity and midshipman aboard USS Somers (born 1823)
- December 31 – George Cassedy, U.S. Representative from New Jersey (born 1783)

== See also ==
- Timeline of United States history (1820–1859)
