= E. Gifford Upjohn =

American business executive (1904–1993)

E. Gifford Upjohn (1904–1993) was an American executive.

== Early life and education ==
E. Gifford Upjohn was born in 1904 in Michigan. He was a grandnephew of founder William E. Upjohn. He earned his Ph.D. from the University of Michigan Medical School in 1928 and completed an internship at the University Hospital in Ann Arbor, Michigan.

== Career ==
Upjohn started his career in 1930 by joining family business, The Upjohn Company.

In 1937, Upjohn company's medical division, at a time when the relationship between pharmaceutical companies and the American Medical Association was marked by skepticism.

Upjohn progressed through various roles, becoming vice president and medical director in 1943, and then executive vice president in 1951. He was appointed president of the company in 1953, and in 1962, he became chairman, a position he held until his retirement in 1969. He remained a board member until 1978.

In 1970, the University of Michigan named a new center for clinical pharmacology after him, when he donated a $1.1 million to the university.

His contributions extended to regulatory matters in the pharmaceutical industry. Upjohn testified at U.S. Senate hearings in 1959 and 1960, focusing on drug pricing. These hearings contributed to legislation that required pharmaceutical companies to demonstrate the safety and effectiveness of their products before market introduction, a shift from earlier regulations that did not mandate such proof through clinical trials.
