= William Cain (American politician) =

American politician

William Henry Cain (October 31, 1792 - August 20, 1878) was an American plantation owner and politician; he served as the 42nd lieutenant governor of South Carolina from 1846 to 1848.

Cain was the son of Daniel Cain (1745–1794) and Elizabeth Greenland. A graduate of South Carolina College, he purchased the plantations Somerset and Somerton in 1827 with Isaac Marion Dwight. In 1828-9 the two were Delegates to the South Carolina General Assembly from St. John's, Berkeley Parish. Cain later bought some of Dwight's share of the plantations as well, and added other properties to them.

Cain continued to serve in the General Assembly until 1833. In 1841 he was elected to the South Carolina State Senate to replace a member who had resigned, and he served there until 1845. In 1844 he was one of South Carolina's presidential electors, voting for Democrat James K. Polk. From 1846 to 1848 he was lieutenant governor, serving under governor David Johnson.

In 1860 he was a delegate to the South Carolina "Convention of the People of South Carolina" called to discuss secession and was a signatory to the South Carolina Ordinance of Secession.

== Personal life ==
Cain's brother Daniel was also a plantation owner; after his death in 1829 Cain was his executor. As executor, he petitioned the legislature for compensation for a slave named Frank who was executed for trying to poison his master.

Cain first married Anna Maria Dubose (1793–1827), sister of another future lieutenant governor, William DuBose. After her death Cain married Anne Palmer in 1829. Cain had at least four sons: Captain William Henry Cain (1834–1909), Dr. Joseph Palmer Cain (1836–1903), Edward Cain (b. 1845), and John Calhoun Cain (1838–1916); and a daughter, Anna Maria Cain (1841–1905). His second wife Anne died in 1855 in a carriage accident.

Cain is buried in St. Stephen's Episcopal Church Cemetery, Berkeley County, South Carolina.

Political offices
| Preceded by John Fulton Ervin | Lieutenant Governor of South Carolina; 1846–1848 | Succeeded by William H. Gist |
