= Edwin H. Tomlinson =

Edwin Hyde Tomlinson
- Born: 1844; Connecticut, United States
- Died: December 5, 1938 (aged 93–94); Tampa, Florida, United States
- Occupations: Businessman, philanthropist
- Known for: Early benefactor of St. Petersburg, Florida
- Parent(s): Peter Tomlinson (father); Augusta Tomlinson (mother)

Edwin Hyde Tomlinson (1844 – December 5, 1938) was a world traveler, and an early benefactor of St. Petersburg, Florida in the United States, best known for his many gifts to the city and its inhabitants. Tomlinson built the city's first brick school, constructed a 2,500-seat auditorium, donated the land for the first electrical plant, constructed St. Peter's Episcopal Church, and helped develop the city's first hospital and open-air post office. His most well known attraction in St. Petersburg was the Fountain of Youth.

== Early life ==
Edwin H. Tomlinson was born in Connecticut in 1844 to Peter Tomlinson and Augusta Tomlinson. After finishing public school, Tomlinson became a bank teller earning $4.00 a month at the age of 18 years. He went on to serve in the Union Army during the Civil War. After the Civil War, Tomlinson started work in the oil fields of Pennsylvania and then continued south to Aiken, South Carolina to help open the South's first tourist hotel. Tomlinson went on to make his fortune in the mining and oil business between 1874 and 1897. It was during this time that he first visited St. Petersburg when the town only had about 1,575 residents, as a snowbird.

In 1896, at the age of fifty-two, Tomlinson made the move to St. Petersburg, Florida, and began investing his time, money and efforts to the City of St. Petersburg.

== Contributions ==
=== Fountain of Youth ===
Near the end of 1901, Tomlinson had uncovered a spring that contained more lithium than any other spring in the state of Florida. This spring became known as the Fountain of Youth. Despite its sulfur smell, it became a tourist attraction for over 60 years.

== Church and Hospital ==
In 1899, Tomlinson built St. Peter's Episcopal Church and rectory in honor of his father Peter Tomlinson. He also included a pipe organ. In honor of his late mother, Tomlinson helped to build St. Petersburg's first hospital, Augusta Hospital, now known as Bayfront Medical Center. The hospital was named "Mound Park Hospital" until 1968, then became Bayfront Medical Center.

== Students and school system ==
In 1896, Tomlinson held the first ever Festival of States, known at the time as "George Washington’s Birthday Parade". He gave the local children flags and costumes to use for the parade.

Tomlinson was a major patron to the students of St. Petersburg. He spent $10,000 to build the city's first brick school, also known as Florida's First Manual Training School. The school opened in 1901. It offered classes in military science, manual arts, and homemaking. He would later deed the school to the City of St. Petersburg.

For $15,000.00 in 1902, Tomlinson built the city's largest structure: The Manual Training Annex. The annex was a brick building which has a pipe organ, a floor that could be used for basketball, physical classes, the cadet's drills and could seat 2,500 people.

In that same year, Tomlinson helped to create a cadet company and a fife and drum corps at St. Petersburg High School. He was also an active supporter of the YMCA, Boy Scouts, and American Legion.

== Car ==
In 1905, Tomlinson brought the first car to St. Petersburg. At the time the car could only go 6 miles per hour.

== Open-air post office ==
When the postmaster of St. Petersburg, Roy S. Hanna, had a need in the form of a new post office, Tomlinson stepped in to help him. He constructed a new open-air post office. This allowed residents access to their mailboxes at any time of the day or night. This brought on many protest by the federal government, even causing them to come to St. Petersburg to see the structure.

== Tomlinson House ==
In 1898, during his travels to Italy, Tomlinson met and became friends with Guglielmo Marconi. Tomlinson expressed his interest to Marconi regarding Marconi conducting radio experiments in Florida. In 1901, after this conversation, Tomlinson constructed a 137-foot tower on his home for Marconi to work out of. This tower later became known as the Tomlinson Tower. Six months after the tower was finished, it was badly damaged by a lightning strike.

== Honors and awards ==
In 1924, Tomlinson was awarded St. Petersburg's first Silver Cup. The award was started by H.B. Smitz Realty in order to recognize the admirable citizenship of individuals. The in 1935, Mayor R.G. Blanc informed H.B. Smitz Realty that the Boy's Junior High School at Mirror Lake would now be known as the Edwin Tomlinson Vocational School.

== Death ==
Edwin Hyde Tomlinson died at his home on December 6, 1938, in Tampa, Florida. He was 94 years old. After all of Tomlinson's contributions, he died with only $9,773 to his name. The American Legion held a military funeral for him at Royal Palm Cemetery.
