= Isaac Donnom Witherspoon =

American politician

40th Lieutenant Governor of South Carolina
- In office December 1842 – December 1844
- Governor: James H. Hammond
- Preceded by: William K. Clowney
- Succeeded by: John Fulton Ervin

Personal details
- Born: December 3, 1803
- Died: July 30, 1858 (aged 54)

Isaac Donnom Witherspoon (December 3, 1803 - July 30, 1858) was a politician in South Carolina.

He served in the state house and then the state senate. He succeeded William K. Clowney as lieutenant governor and served from December 1842 until December 1844. He was succeeded by John Fulton Ervin.

Isaac Witherspoon died of a stroke in 1858, aged 54.

== See also ==
- List of lieutenant governors of South Carolina
