= Peter Remondino =

American physician

Peter Charles Remondino
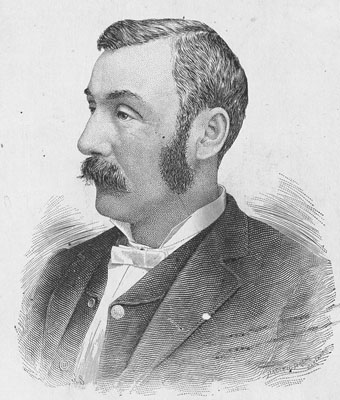
- Born: February 10, 1846; Turin, Italy
- Died: December 10, 1926 (aged 80); San Diego, California
- Education: Jefferson Medical College
- Scientific career
- Fields: Medicine

Peter Charles Remondino (February 10, 1846 – December 10, 1926) was an Italian-American physician, pro-circumcision advocate, first president of the San Diego Board of Health, and co-founder of San Diego’s first private hospital. In the course of a medical career spanning 55 years, he served with the Union forces during the American Civil War as surgeon. He also served as a surgeon during the Franco-Prussian War, for which he was awarded a medal by the French Government for his services.

== Early life ==
Remondino was born in Turin on February 10, 1846. Turin was part of the Piedmont area of the Kingdom of Sardinia at that time. At the age of eight he emigrated to America with his father, arriving in New York and eventually settling in Minnesota. Remondino studied in a one-room schoolhouse from 1857 to 1861, supplementing his lessons by readings from his father's vast library. Besides history, math, and the sciences, Remondino learned various languages including French, German, Latin, and Sioux.

== Death ==
Peter Charles Remondino died in San Diego on December 10, 1926.
