= Neil Burgess (comedian) =

American comedian (1846–1910)

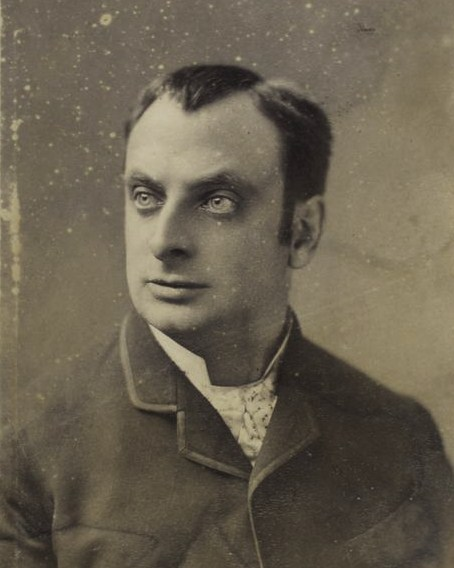
- Born: 1846; Boston, Massachusetts, US
- Died: February 19, 1910 (aged 63–64); New York City, US
- Occupation: Comedian

Neil Burgess (1846 – February 19, 1910) was an American comedian.

== Biography ==
Burgess was born in Boston, in 1846. (Note: Some sources list his birth year as 1851.) He started his unusual career at age 19, when he was called on to fill in for an ailing actress in The Quiet Family in Providence, Rhode Island.

Burgess debuted in New York as a solo artist in 1872 under producer Tony Pastor, when he was billed as an "Ethiopian Comedian". His first role as a female impersonator came in 1877 in The Coming Woman for the Theatre Comique of Edward Harrigan and Tony Hart. He was soon recognized as one of the leading female impersonators, successively playing women's parts in vaudeville. By the 1880s, he took several such roles in The Widow and the Elder, Betsey Bobbet: A Drama (later renamed Vim), and the County Fair. His greatest success was Widow Bedott in 1879. He also produced and starred as Auntie Abigail Prue in Charles Barnard's play The County Fair in 1889. George C. Odell later reflected on these roles: "I still see him as Widow Bedott in the kitchen, making pies, straightening out the affairs of the neighborhood and personifying, in spite of his sex, the attributes of a managing woman. He was not the least bit effeminate, not at all like the usual female impersonator of minstrelsy or of variety, and yet he was Widow Bedott to the life, and with little suggestion of burlesque".

Burgess was also interested in inventions tied to the stage and backed a turntable device that allowed horses to run at full speed on stage, and another device that simulated the sound of a large crowd.

Burgess was married to actress Mary Stoddard (died 1905). He died on February 19, 1910, aged 63, in his home in New York City.
