= 1788 in the United States =

- Decades: 1770s; 1780s; 1790s; 1800s
- See also: History of the United States (1776–1789); Timeline of the American Revolution; List of years in the United States

Events from the year 1788 in the United States.

== Incumbents ==
=== Federal government ===
- President: Cyrus Griffin (starting January 29)
- Congress of the Confederation

==== State governments ====
Governors and lieutenant governors

=== Governors ===
- Governor of Connecticut: Samuel Huntington (Federalist) (starting January 9)
- Governor of Delaware: Thomas Collins (no political party)
- Governor of Georgia: George Mathews (no political party) (January 2-January 26), George Handley (no political party) (starting January 26)
- Governor of Maryland: William Smallwood (no political party) (April 28-November 24), John E. Howard (starting November 24)
- Governor of Massachusetts: John Hancock (no political party) (starting February 6)
- Governor of New Hampshire: John Langdon (Democratic-Republican) (starting June 21)
- Governor of New Jersey: William Livingston (Federalist)
- Governor of New York: George Clinton (Democratic-Republican) (starting July 26)
- Governor of Pennsylvania: Benjamin Franklin (Independent) (until November 5), Thomas Mifflin (no political party) (starting November 5)
- Governor of South Carolina: Thomas Pinckney (Federalist) (starting May 23)
- Governor of Virginia: Edmund Randolph (no political party) (June 25-December 1), Beverley Randolph (no political party) (starting December 1)

=== Lieutenant governors ===
- Lieutenant Governor of Connecticut: Oliver Wolcott (Federalist) (starting January 9)
- Lieutenant Governor of Massachusetts: Benjamin Lincoln (Federalist) (starting February 6)
- Lieutenant Governor of New York: Pierre Van Cortlandt (political party unknown) (starting July 26)
- Lieutenant Governor of South Carolina: Thomas Gadsden (Federalist) (starting May 23)

== Events ==
- January 2 – Georgia ratifies the United States Constitution and becomes the 4th U.S. state under the new government (see History of Georgia).
- January 9 – Connecticut ratifies the United States Constitution and becomes the 5th U.S. state (see History of Connecticut).
- January 22 – the Continental Congress, effectively a caretaker government, elects Cyrus Griffin as its last president.
- February 1 – Isaac Briggs and William Longstreet patent the steamboat in Georgia.
- February 6 – Massachusetts ratifies the United States Constitution and becomes the 6th U.S. state (see History of Massachusetts).
- March 21 – Great New Orleans Fire (1788) kills 25% of the population and destroys 856 buildings, including St. Louis Cathedral and the Cabildo, leaving most of the town in ruins. At the time New Orleans was a Spanish colony that would be secretly given to France in 1800. Not until 1803 would New Orleans as part of the Louisiana Purchase become part of the United States.
- April 7 – American pioneers establish the town of Marietta (in modern-day Ohio), the first permanent American settlement outside the original Thirteen Colonies.
- April 13 – A riot, the Doctors' Mob, begins. Residents of Manhattan are angry about grave robbers stealing bodies for doctors to dissect. The rioting is suppressed on the 15th.
- April 28 – Maryland ratifies the United States Constitution and becomes the 7th U.S. state (see History of Maryland).
- May 23 – South Carolina ratifies the United States Constitution and becomes the 8th U.S. state (see History of South Carolina).
- June 21 – New Hampshire ratifies the United States Constitution and becomes the 9th U.S. state (see History of New Hampshire), the Constitution goes into effect.
- June 25 – Virginia ratifies the United States Constitution and becomes the 10th U.S. state under the new government (see History of Virginia).
- July 26 – New York ratifies the United States Constitution and becomes the 11th U.S. state (see History of New York).
- November 15 – Cyrus Griffin resigns as President of the Continental Congress after only two delegates arrived for the final session.
- December 15 – The first presidential election begins. This election would end on January 7th of the following year. George Washington was elected unanimously.

=== Ongoing ===
- Articles of Confederation in effect (1781–1788)
- Northwest Indian War (1785–1795)

== Births ==
- April 14 – David Gouverneur Burnet, politician (died 1870)
- September 15 – Gerard Brandon, 4th and 6th Governor of Mississippi from 1825 till 1826 and from 1826 till 1832. (died 1850)
- September 21 – Margaret Taylor, First Lady of the United States (died 1852)
- November 8 – Jabez W. Huntington, United States Senator from Connecticut from 1840 till 1847. (died 1847)
- Date unknown – Sacagawea, interpreter and guide on the Lewis and Clark Expedition (died 1812)

== Deaths ==
- January 9 – Benedict Swingate Calvert, judge (born 1722)
- February 28 – Thomas Cushing, 1st Lieutenant Governor of Massachusetts (born 1725)
- March 29 – Charles Wesley (born 1707)
- September 14 – John Penn, founding father (born 1741)
- Thomas Adams, politician and business man (born 1730)

== See also ==
- Timeline of the American Revolution (1760–1789)
