= James Young (Missouri politician) =

American politician (1800–1878)

7th Lieutenant Governor of Missouri
- In office November 20, 1844 – November 20, 1848
- Governor: John C. Edwards
- Preceded by: Meredith Miles Marmaduke
- Succeeded by: Thomas Lawson Price

Member of the Missouri Senate
- In office 1840–1844

Member of the Missouri House of Representatives
- In office 1836–1838

Member of the Tennessee House of Representatives
- In office 1831–1833

Personal details
- Born: May 11, 1800 Hawkins County, Tennessee, U.S.
- Died: February 9, 1878 (aged 77) Lexington, Missouri, U.S.
- Party: Democratic

James Young (May 11, 1800 – February 9, 1878) was an American politician. He was the Lieutenant Governor of Missouri from 1844 to 1848. He also served in the Tennessee House of Representatives from 1831 to 1833, in the Missouri House of Representatives 1836 to 1838, and in the Missouri Senate from 1840 to 1844.

He died at his home near Lexington, Missouri on February 9, 1878.
