= John Fulton Ervin =

South Carolina politician

John Fulton Ervin (February 16, 1807- October 20, 1856) was a state legislator and the 41st lieutenant governor of South Carolina from 1844 to 1846.

In 1839 he was cashier in the South Carolina House of Representatives.

He was elected lieutenant governor in 1844, by a vote in the South Carolina House and Senate. William Aiken Jr. was governor.

For the 1852 to 1853 term he represented Darlington District in the South Carolina House of Representatives.

He was painted by William Harrison Scarborough.
