= Mutiny on the Amistad (book) =

1987 book by Howard Jones

Mutiny on the Amistad: The Saga of a Slave Revolt and Its Impact on American Abolition, Law, and Diplomacy
- Author: Howard Jones
- Language: English
- Subject: History/U.S. History/African American history
- Genre: Non-fiction
- Published: January 1, 1987; Oxford University Press
- Publication place: United States
- Media type: paperback
- Pages: 304 pages
- ISBN: 0-19-503829-0
- OCLC: 20257813

Mutiny on the Amistad: The Saga of a Slave Revolt and Its Impact on American Abolition, Law, and Diplomacy (1987) is a history of a notable slave mutiny of 1839 and its aftermath, written by professor Howard Jones.

The book explores the events surrounding the slave mutiny on the Spanish schooner La Amistad in 1839. The ship was taken into United States custody off the south coast of Long Island, New York. The book discusses the roles and international dynamics of the case, involving Spain, England, and the United States as they related to the 19th-century slave trade. It examines United States v. The Amistad Africans 40 U.S. (15 Pet.) 518 (1841), the United States Supreme Court case that adjudicated the property issues and ultimately the fate of the Mende people who were held captive on La Amistad and the ownership of the vessel.

== Reception ==
In his review published in Civil War History, Dudley T. Cornish noted that in 1965, the historian Samuel Eliot Morison described the Amistad case of 1839 as "the most famous involving slavery," until it was "eclipsed by the Dred Scott decision." Cornish wrote that Jones' work was "a careful, comprehensive study" that should make it easy to restore references to the case in textbooks, where it had been overlooked in the prior decade.

== Legacy ==
The 1997 film Amistad, directed by Steven Spielberg, is based on this book, including the Supreme Court case. It stars Anthony Hopkins as John Quincy Adams, Morgan Freeman as an American abolitionist, Djimon Hounsou as Cinqué, leader of the slaves; and Matthew McConaughey as Roger Sherman Baldwin, the lawyer to the Mende captives.

== See also ==
- United States v. The Amistad
- Abolitionism in the United States
- Amistad film
- John Quincy Adams and abolitionism
