= Amistad (film) =

1997 film directed by Steven Spielberg

- Theatrical release poster
- Directed by: Steven Spielberg
- Written by: David Franzoni
- Produced by: Steven Spielberg; Debbie Allen; Colin Wilson
- Starring: Morgan Freeman; Nigel Hawthorne; Anthony Hopkins; Djimon Hounsou; Matthew McConaughey; David Paymer; Pete Postlethwaite; Stellan Skarsgård
- Cinematography: Janusz Kamiński
- Edited by: Michael Kahn
- Music by: John Williams
- Production companies: DreamWorks Pictures; HBO Pictures; Amblin Entertainment
- Distributed by: DreamWorks Distribution
- Release date: December 10, 1997
- Running time: 154 minutes
- Country: United States
- Languages: English; Mende; Spanish
- Budget: $39 million
- Box office: $58.3 million

Amistad is a 1997 American historical drama film directed by Steven Spielberg and written by David Franzoni, based on the events in 1839 aboard the Spanish slave ship La Amistad, during which Mende tribesmen abducted for the slave trade managed to gain control of their captors' ship off the coast of Cuba, and the international legal battle that followed their capture by the Washington, a U.S. revenue cutter. The case was ultimately resolved by the U.S. Supreme Court in 1841.

Morgan Freeman, Anthony Hopkins, and Matthew McConaughey star, along with Djimon Hounsou in his breakout role as Cinqué; Pete Postlethwaite, Nigel Hawthorne and Chiwetel Ejiofor appear in supporting roles.

The film was released by DreamWorks Pictures on December 10, 1997. The film received largely positive critical reviews and grossed $58.3 million worldwide against a $39 million budget.

== Plot ==
The schooner La Amistad is transporting black slaves off the coast of the Spanish colony of Cuba in 1839. A captive, Cinqué, leads an uprising against the crew, most of whom are killed. Two navigators, Pedro Montes and José Ruiz, are spared on condition they help sail the ship to Africa. The Spaniards betray them and instead sail into U.S. waters, where the ship is stopped by the U.S. revenue cutter Washington, and the mutineers are arrested.

A complicated legal battle ensues over the slaves. United States Attorney William S. Holabird brings charges of piracy and murder against them. Those charges are dismissed in a criminal case because the killings occurred outside United States territorial waters.

A civil case then follows, with the Amistad Africans being claimed as property by Montes and Ruiz, and as salvage by two officers from the Washington. The Spanish government of Queen Isabella II (Note: Queen Isabella II of Spain was the nominal head of the Spanish government, but at the time was a minor and living in exile in Rome with her mother Maria Christina of the Two Sicilies while Spain was under the liberal regency of Baldomero Espartero and under the government of prime minister Antonio González, 1st Marquess of Valdeterrazo.) intervenes in support of Montes and Ruiz, under the Treaty of 1795, also known as Pinckney's Treaty. To avoid a diplomatic incident, President Martin Van Buren directs his Secretary of State John Forsyth to support the Spanish claim. Meanwhile, abolitionist Lewis Tappan and his black associate Theodore Joadson (a former slave) resolve to help the captives. They approach the brilliant lawyer, former U.S. president and serving U.S. representative John Quincy Adams, but he is reluctant to get involved. They instead hire the young and eccentric attorney Roger Sherman Baldwin.

Baldwin, unable to converse directly with his clients due to the language barrier, suspects that the slaves are not Cubans but Africans who have been kidnapped and transported illegally as part of the banned transatlantic slave trade. He and Joadson search La Amistad and find documents which prove that the captives were kidnapped from Sierra Leone and transported across the Atlantic aboard the Portuguese slave ship Tecora before being transferred to La Amistad in Havana. The judge is impressed and signals his intention to dismiss the U.S. and Spanish governments' case and release the captives.

To preclude this possibility, Van Buren replaces the judge with a younger man, Coglin, who he believes will be easier to manipulate. Joadson seeks advice from Adams, who tells him that court cases are usually won by the side with the best 'story'. Baldwin and Joadson recruit freedman James Covey as a translator, enabling Cinqué to testify directly before the court. He describes how he was kidnapped from his home, and the horrors of the Middle Passage. Baldwin calls Captain Charles Fitzgerald of the Royal Navy's West Africa Squadron to corroborate Cinqué's testimony. He speculates that the captives were taken aboard the Tecora at the notorious slave fort Lomboko. Under cross-examination, Fitzgerald admits that there is no direct evidence of Lomboko's existence. As tension rises, Cinqué abruptly stands and demands, "Give us, us free!". Moved by Cinqué's emotion, Judge Coglin rules that the Africans are to be released, and that Montes and Ruiz are to be arrested and charged with illegal slave-trading.

Under pressure from Senator John C. Calhoun of South Carolina, who represents the slave-holding interests of the American South, Van Buren appeals the case to the Supreme Court. Baldwin and Joadson visit Adams again, and after meeting Cinqué he agrees to represent the Africans before the Supreme Court. Adams' impassioned and eloquent speech convinces the court to confirm the judgement and release the Africans.

Lomboko is stormed by Royal Marines led by Fitzgerald, and the slaves held there are freed. Fitzgerald orders the ship's cannon to destroy the fortress, and dictates a sardonic letter to Forsyth saying that he was correct — the infamous slave fort does not (now) exist.

Van Buren is discredited by his failure to prevent the release of the Africans, and loses the 1840 election to William Henry Harrison. The Spanish government continues to press its claim for compensation up until the American Civil War.

The captions say that Cinqué returns to Africa, but is unable to reunite with his family due to civil war in Sierra Leone.

== Cast ==
- Morgan Freeman as Theodore Joadson
- Anthony Hopkins as John Quincy Adams
- Djimon Hounsou as Sengbe Pieh / Joseph Cinqué
- Matthew McConaughey as Roger Sherman Baldwin
- Nigel Hawthorne as President Martin Van Buren
- David Paymer as Secretary of State John Forsyth
- Pete Postlethwaite as William S. Holabird
- Stellan Skarsgård as Lewis Tappan
- Razaaq Adoti as Yamba
- Abu Bakaar Fofanah as Fala
- Anna Paquin as Queen Isabella II of Spain
- Tomas Milian as Ángel Calderón de la Barca y Belgrano
- Chiwetel Ejiofor as Ensign James Covey
- Derrick Ashong as Buakei
- Geno Silva as José Ruiz
- John Ortiz as Pedro Montes
- Kevin J. O'Connor as Missionary
- Ralph Brown as Lieutenant Thomas R. Gedney
- Darren E. Burrows as Lieutenant Richard W. Meade
- Allan Rich as Judge Andrew T. Judson
- Paul Guilfoyle as Attorney
- Peter Firth as Captain Charles Fitzgerald
- Xander Berkeley as Ledger Hammond
- Jeremy Northam as Judge Coglin
- Arliss Howard as Senator John C. Calhoun of South Carolina
- Austin Pendleton as Professor Josiah Willard Gibbs Sr.
- Pedro Armendáriz Jr. as General Baldomero Espartero
- Harry Blackmun as Justice Joseph Story

=== Casting ===
In casting the role of Joseph Cinqué, Spielberg had strict requirements that the actor must have an impressive physical appearance, be able to command authority and be of West African descent. The actor who secured the role would also need to learn the Mende accent spoken by Cinqué. Cuba Gooding Jr. was offered the role but turned it down and later regretted it. Dustin Hoffman was offered a role but turned it down, while Will Smith and musician Seal both tried to secure the part. Despite open auditions being held in London, Paris and Sierra Leone, the role remained unfilled with just nine weeks before filming was due to start. Spielberg was prepared to delay production by up to two years if he could not find the right actor. After considering over 150 actors, Spielberg watched the audition tape of relatively unknown actor Djimon Hounsou reading a speech from the film's script. After Hounsou read the speech in English and further learned it in Mende, Spielberg was impressed enough to cast him in the role of Cinqué. Hounsou auditioned with the hope of landing just a small role and said he was not aware of the story before securing the role. He read numerous books on the rebellion and subsequent trial to acquaint himself with events portrayed in the film.

Morgan Freeman was selected for the role of Theodore Joadson on a first-come basis; Joadson was a fictional character in the film representing the composite of African American abolitionists in the 19th century. The actor and film director Spike Lee was reportedly offered the role but declined it. Freeman had been offered the role of Ensign James Covey, but he chose to play Joadson instead after he realized that Covey was too young for him. Chiwetel Ejiofor made his film debut as Covey, having auditioned for it while playing Othello at the Royal National Theatre in London while he was still a student at the London Academy of Music and Dramatic Art.

Retired U.S. Supreme Court Justice Harry Blackmun made a cameo appearance in the film as Justice Joseph Story. Blackmun was honored to appear in the movie, acknowledging it was a "significant film about our nation's struggle with slavery".

== Production ==
Djimon Hounsou had just 10 days to learn the Mende language for his role as Joseph Cinqué; despite both Mende and Hounsou's native Gun language being from West Africa, there were few similarities. Hounsou struggled to learn all his lines in Mende and resorted to phonetically reciting some of them, except for the most important scenes where he made sure to understand every word spoken. Hounsou expressed that being restrained in real chains and shackles during filming was among the most challenging aspects of the movie, causing him to contemplate quitting on the first day.

=== Filming ===
Filming locations included Mystic Seaport, which doubled as New Haven. Film crews spent four days there and employed around 300 extras Numerous scenes were filmed in Newport, Rhode Island. Many courthouse scenes were shot in the Old Colony House, while the prison scenes were shot within Fort Adams.

During the scene where the characters Joseph Cinqué and John Quincy Adams meet for the first time, actors Hounsou and Anthony Hopkins "struggled through take after take, trying not to cry" and had to be continually told by Steven Spielberg to hold back the tears as it wasn't appropriate for that moment in the scene. Hopkins reportedly wept once the scene was completed.

=== Post-production ===
The entire film was completed in 51 days and cost around $39 million (~$88 million in 2025).

Prior to release, a legal battle ensued between Spielberg's DreamWorks Pictures and novelist Barbara Chase-Riboud; the latter claiming that specific details from her 1989 novel Echo of Lions were lifted for the screenplay. Chase-Riboud filed a $10 million lawsuit of copyright infringement.

== Soundtrack ==
=== Music ===
Amistad: Original Motion Picture Soundtrack

Film score by John Williams
- Released: December 9, 1997
- Recorded: 1997
- Studio: Sony Pictures Studios
- Genre: Film score
- Length: 55:51
- Label: DreamWorks
- Producer: John Williams

John Williams chronology
Seven Years in Tibet (1997)	Amistad: Original Motion Picture Soundtrack (1997)	Saving Private Ryan (1998)

Professional ratings
Review scores
Source	Rating
AllMusic	4/5 stars
Filmtracks	4/5 stars
Movie Wave	3/5 stars

The musical score for Amistad was composed and conducted by John Williams. A soundtrack album was released on December 9, 1997, by DreamWorks Records.

== Historical accuracy ==
Professor Howard Jones's 1987 book Mutiny on the Amistad: The Saga of a Slave Revolt and Its Impact on American Abolition, Law, and Diplomacy was cited by the producers as one of numerous sources used for research during the script's development.

Many academics, including Columbia University professor Eric Foner, have criticized Amistad for the misleading characterization of the Amistad case as a "turning point" in American views on slavery, writing that:

In fact, the Amistad case revolved around the Atlantic slave trade — by 1840 outlawed by international treaty — and had nothing whatsoever to do with slavery as a domestic institution. Incongruous as it may seem, it was perfectly possible in the nineteenth century to condemn the importation of slaves from Africa while simultaneously defending slavery and the flourishing slave trade within the United States... Amistad’s problems go far deeper than such anachronisms as President Martin Van Buren campaigning for re-election on a whistle-stop train tour (in 1840, candidates did not campaign), or people constantly talking about the impending Civil War, which lay 20 years in the future.

Elmer P. Martin Jr. argued that the film missed an opportunity to mention contemporary events like the Creole case, a similar slave revolt on an American ship in 1841. Martin noted that some antebellum abolitionists such as Frederick Douglass found it "strange and perverse" that some of the defenders of the Amistad slaves were willing to excuse the "similar traffic carried on with the same motives and purposes" in American waters.

Some critics, like historian Eric McKitrick, felt that the fictional character of Joadson, as portrayed by Morgan Freeman, softened the film's portrayal of contemporary American race relations: "No such person of the bearing and dignity depicted by Mr. Freeman would have been allowed to exist in the America of 1840." However, Richard S. Newman drew a connection between Joadson and Black reformers like James Forten, an early abolitionist who influenced white reformers like Tappan and William Lloyd Garrison.

== Reception ==
=== Critical response ===
Amistad received mainly positive reviews. On Rotten Tomatoes, the film has an approval rating of 78% based on reviews from 68 critics, with an average score of 7.0/10. Its consensus reads: "Heartfelt without resorting to preachiness, Amistad tells an important story with engaging sensitivity and absorbing skill." Metacritic calculated an average score of 63 out of 100 based on 23 reviews, indicating "generally favorable" reviews. Audiences polled by CinemaScore gave the film an average grade of "A−" on an A+ to F scale.

Susan Wloszczyna of USA Today summed up the feelings of many reviewers when she wrote, "as Spielberg vehicles go, Amistad — part mystery, action thriller, courtroom drama, even culture-clash comedy — lands between the disturbing lyricism of Schindler's List and the storybook artificiality of The Color Purple." Roger Ebert awarded the film three out of four stars, writing:

Amistad, like Spielberg's Schindler's List, is [...] about the ways good men try to work realistically within an evil system to spare a few of its victims. [...] Schindler's List works better as narrative because it is about a risky deception, while Amistad is about the search for a truth that, if found, will be small consolation to the millions of existing slaves. As a result, the movie doesn't have the emotional charge of Spielberg's earlier film — or of The Color Purple, which moved me to tears. [...] What is most valuable about Amistad is the way it provides faces and names for its African characters, whom the movies so often make into faceless victims.

In 2014, the movie was one of several discussed by Noah Berlatsky in The Atlantic in an article concerning white savior narratives in film, calling it "sanctimonious drivel."

Morgan Freeman is very proud of the movie, having said, "I loved the film. I really did. I had a moment of err, during the killings. I thought that was a little over-wrought. But [Spielberg] wanted to make a point and I understood that."

=== Box office ===
The film debuted at No. 3 on Wednesday, December 10, 1997. It earned $44,229,441 at the box office in the United States.

== Accolades ==
Amistad was nominated for Academy Awards in four categories: Best Supporting Actor (Anthony Hopkins), Best Original Dramatic Score (John Williams), Best Cinematography (Janusz Kamiński), and Best Costume Design (Ruth E. Carter).

Award	Category	Nominee(s)	Result
Academy Award	Best Supporting Actor	Anthony Hopkins	Nominated
Academy Award	Best Cinematography	Janusz Kamiński	Nominated
Academy Award	Best Costume Design	Ruth E. Carter	Nominated
Academy Award	Best Original Dramatic Score	John Williams	Nominated
American Society of Cinematographers	Outstanding Achievement in Cinematography in Theatrical Releases	Janusz Kamiński	Nominated
Art Directors Guild	Excellence in Production Design for a Feature Film	Rick Carter (production designer), Tony Fanning, Christopher Burian-Mohr, William James Teegarden (art directors); Lauren Polizzi, John Berger, Paul Sonski (assistant art directors); Nicholas Lundy, Hugh Landwehr (new york art directors)	Nominated
Chicago Film Critics Association	Best Supporting Actor	Anthony Hopkins	Nominated
Chicago Film Critics Association	Most Promising Actor	Djimon Hounsou	Nominated
Critics' Choice Movie Award	Best Film		Nominated
Critics' Choice Movie Award	Best Supporting Actor	Anthony Hopkins	Won
David di Donatello	Best Foreign Film	Steven Spielberg	Nominated
Directors Guild of America Award	Outstanding Directing – Feature Film	Steven Spielberg	Nominated
European Film Awards	Achievement in World Cinema (also for Good Will Hunting)	Stellan Skarsgård	Won
Golden Globe Award	Best Actor – Motion Picture Drama	Djimon Hounsou	Nominated
Golden Globe Award	Best Director	Steven Spielberg	Nominated
Golden Globe Award	Best Motion Picture – Drama		Nominated
Golden Globe Award	Best Supporting Actor – Motion Picture	Anthony Hopkins	Nominated
Grammy Award	Best Instrumental Composition Written for a Motion Picture or for Television	John Williams	Nominated
NAACP Image Award	Outstanding Actor in a Motion Picture	Djimon Hounsou	Won
NAACP Image Award	Outstanding Motion Picture		Nominated
NAACP Image Award	Outstanding Supporting Actor in a Motion Picture	Morgan Freeman	Won
Online Film Critics Society	Best Supporting Actor	Anthony Hopkins	Nominated
Producers Guild of America Award	Best Theatrical Motion Picture	Steven Spielberg, Debbie Allen, Colin Wilson	Nominated
Political Film Society Awards	Exposé		Nominated
Satellite Award	Best Actor – Motion Picture Drama	Djimon Hounsou	Nominated
Satellite Award	Best Adapted Screenplay	David Franzoni	Nominated
Satellite Award	Best Art Direction and Production Design	Rick Carter	Nominated
Satellite Award	Best Cinematography	Janusz Kamiński	Won
Satellite Award	Best Costume Design	Ruth E. Carter	Nominated
Satellite Award	Best Director	Steven Spielberg	Nominated
Satellite Award	Best Editing	Michael Kahn	Nominated
Satellite Award	Best Film – Drama	Steven Spielberg, Debbie Allen, Colin Wilson	Nominated
Satellite Award	Best Original Score	John Williams	Nominated
Screen Actors Guild Award	Outstanding Performance by a Male Actor in a Supporting Role	Anthony Hopkins	Nominated
Southeastern Film Critics Association	Best Supporting Actor	Anthony Hopkins	2nd place

=== Other cultural significance ===
The United States Department of State and the Instituto Cubano del Arte e Industria Cinematográficos (ICAIC) collaborated in 1998 to screen Amistad as part of an effort to increase "cultural diplomacy" built around shared national histories of racial struggles in the United States and Cuba.

== Home media ==
DreamWorks Home Entertainment released the film on VHS in 1998, and then on DVD the following year. On August 17, 1999, it received a LaserDisc release in the United States. It was also released on LaserDisc in Japan on October 22, 1999. In February 2006, Viacom (now known as Paramount Skydance) acquired the rights to Amistad and all other live-action films DreamWorks had released between 1997 and 2005, following its billion-dollar acquisition of the studio's live-action film and television library. On May 6, 2014, Paramount Home Entertainment released the film on Blu-ray.

== See also ==
- List of films featuring slavery
- Supreme Court of the United States in fiction
- Trial film
