= Amistad Memorial (New Haven) =

Sculpture in New Haven, Connecticut, U.S.

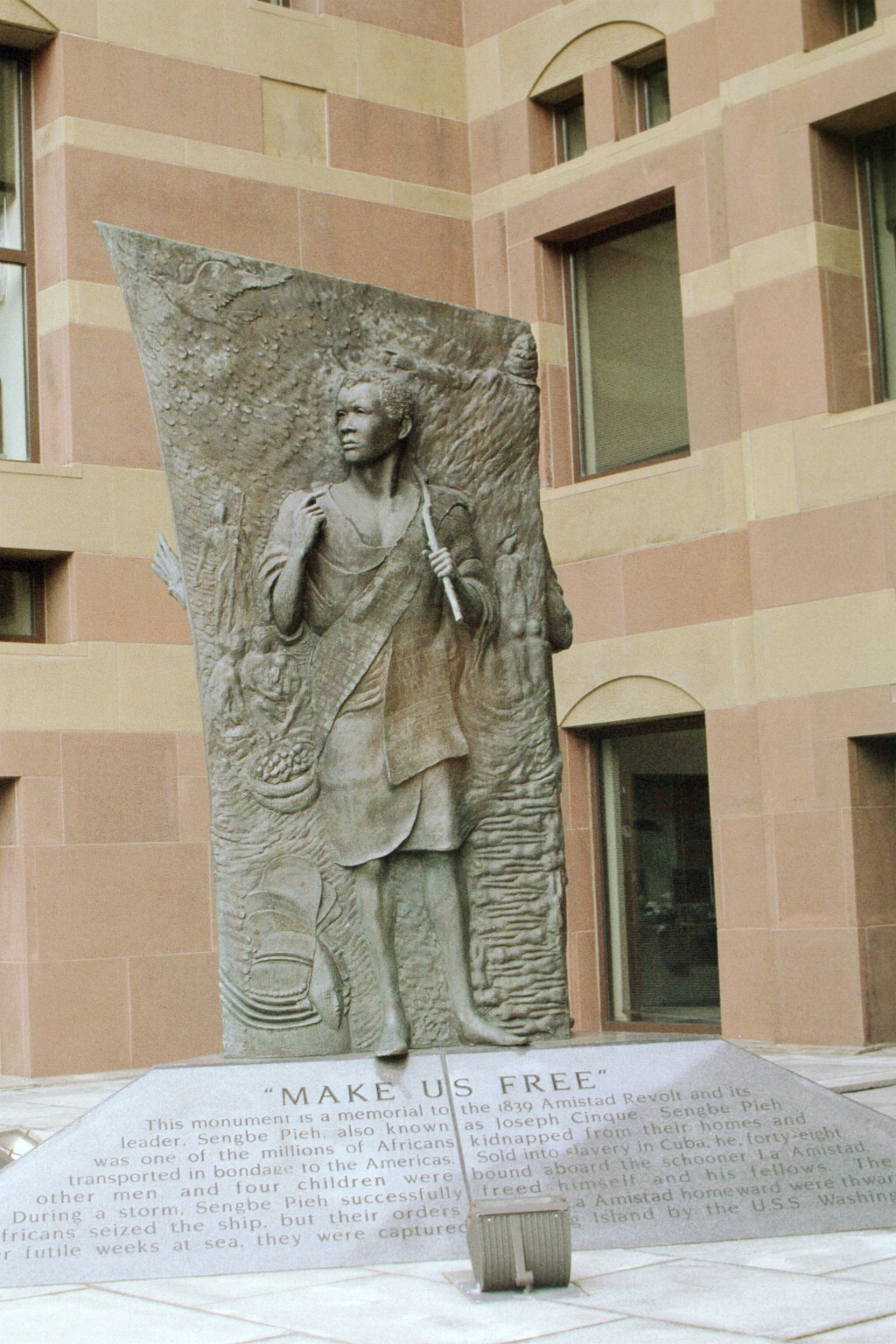
- Artist: Ed Hamilton
- Completion date: Dedicated September 18, 1992
- Medium: Bronze sculpture
- Subject: Joseph Cinque
- Dimensions: 3.04 m (10 ft); tall
- Location: New Haven, Connecticut, U.S.
- Owner: City of New Haven

The Amistad Memorial in New Haven, Connecticut, is a bronze sculpture created by Ed Hamilton to recognize the events of the 1839 Amistad Affair. The affair was a kidnapping of 53 Africans and their subsequent mutiny aboard La Amistad. It led to a historically significant United States Supreme Court case, in which the Amistad captives were ruled to be acting in self-defense, thereby granting them the right to mutiny.

The memorial sits in front of the New Haven City Hall on Church Street, the location where the Amistad slaves were jailed during their trial. It was dedicated on September 18, 1992.

== History ==
=== Background ===
La Amistad was an American ship owned by a Cuban Spaniard that was retrofitted to carry slaves. It is historically infamous because of the revolt which occurred on board the ship in 1839. The long journey of the 53 Mende captives responsible for the revolt began when they were abducted from their home in present-day Sierra Leone, and forced aboard the Portuguese slave ship Tecora, bound for Cuba to be sold as slaves. Upon their secret arrival in Cuba, the captives were transferred to 'La Amistad'. On July 2, 1839, a revolt was led by Sengbe Pieh (also known as Joseph Cinqué) in which the captives overran the ship, threatening death, and ordered the surviving crew to chart a course back to their native Sierra Leone. In a secret act of defiance, the navigator steered the ship north towards the American coast in hopes of rescue. La Amistad was escorted ashore by USRC Washington after being spotted off the tip of Montauk, Long Island. The slaves were interned in New Haven, Connecticut, to be tried for mutiny and murder.

After the Amistad Africans won their court case, and their freedom, many members of the community volunteered their aid: the residents of New Haven gave them housing, tutoring, and legal aid. Participating residents formed the Amistad Committee, and among them was John Quincy Adams, who defended the Amistad captives in their case in front of the Supreme Court. The Amistad captives assimilated into the community, and would spend time in the town green with the locals.

=== Commissioning of the memorial ===
In 1988, citizens of New Haven resurrected the Amistad Committee to organize events to commemorate the 150th anniversary of the Amistad affair. Most prominently, the committee raised funds for the New Haven memorial to be constructed, formed an assembly to construct the Amistad replica, and developed the idea for the Connecticut Freedom Trail, which includes the memorial. In 1992, Khalid Lum, a New Haven writer and activist said about the memorial, "many people who are familiar with the Amistad revolt feel it’s not only a matter of commemorating a historical event. It is also a thin hope and chance that some of the spirit that resulted in Cinque’s and his cohorts’ freedom might be generated."

The Amistad Committee specifically desired that an African-American artist should design and build the memorial, so it contacted predominantly black schools to find a sculptor. The artist who ended up building the sculpture, Ed Hamilton, was not initially informed of the competition. He found out through his friend Earl J. Hooks while he was on holiday. He and four other artists submitted portfolios, but none of them passed jury approval. After asking the artists to re-submit, three were invited to come to the city. Only Hamilton accepted the invitation.

Ed Hamilton, the sculptor of the Amistad Memorial, is an African-American artist, and was born in 1947 in Cincinnati, Ohio, currently residing near Louisville, KY. He attended Spalding University in Louisville, Kentucky, and has been a sculptor and artist for most of his life. His primary works are public sculptures of African-Americans that have made positive contributions to the lives of Americans. One notable work was his Booker T. Washington Memorial, designed and built in 1983-1984.

Hamilton designed a plaster model of the Amistad Memorial, which now resides at the African-American Historical Society in New Haven, Connecticut. He then made the armature for the clay sculpture which was cast in bronze in Louisville, Kentucky and set atop a triangular base of granite.

=== Dedication ===
The memorial was dedicated on September 18, 1992, and an estimated 300 people attended the dedication, despite the fact that it was pouring rain. Clifton H. Johnson, in his lecture "The Legacy of La Amistad" said, "Sculptor Ed Hamilton says in his autobiography that he viewed the rain as symbolic of the tears of all Africans who did not make the final journey home." Among those in attendance was Valentine Strasser, the chairman of the Republic of Sierra Leone. In his speech at the dedication, Strasser said, "I hope all who will come to New Haven and see this statue will remember what it stands for and take with them more than a sense of history.'

== Description ==
The memorial is located in front of New Haven City Hall, which sits on the site where the Amistad captives were held during their trial. Each of the three sides of the memorial depicts Joseph Cinqué: on the first side, in his native clothing in Africa, on the second side, in court during his trials, and on the third side, after he won his freedom. The monument has a fourth side, facing up, which is only visible from the upper floors of City Hall. It depicts a face and hands in water. Laura Macaluso, in her book, "Art of the Amistad and the Portrait of Cinque" claims that this fourth side could represent slaves drowning along the Middle Passage. Its artist, Ed Hamilton comments on the meaning of the top side on his website:

The top of the Memorial is a result of the emotional level of my personal experiences researching for information about slave trading. From the second floor of City Hall you look down and contemplate this final view of the Memorial. Could this be our brother, Foone, who drowned in the Farmington Canal? Or, you could say that this figure, awash in the vastness of an ocean, represents the souls of the many Africans who did not finish their journey of the Middle Passage. I will let you, as viewer, debate the meaning of this journey.

For the memorial, Hamilton employed a technique known as relief in which the foreground image juts out from the background. Each side demonstrates both high relief (where the projection from the background is much greater than low relief) and low relief to display secondary objects, including the faces of other captives and abolitionists. The three portraits of Cinqué are sculpted in high relief.
