= Willard Gibbs (disambiguation) =

Willard Gibbs may refer to:

- Willard Gibbs (linguist), American linguist and professor of theology and sacred literature at Yale university
- Willard Gibbs, his son, American physical chemist

== See also ==
- Willard Gibbs Award
