= Pedro Blanco (slave trader) =

Spanish slave trader (1795–1854)

Pedro Blanco (1795 – 1854) was a Spanish slave trader based in Gallinas on the coast of Sierra Leone between 1822 and 1838. Before entering the slave trade, Blanco ran a sugar mill in Cuba.

Blanco sailed to Africa on the Conquistador, one of his ships, to participate in the lucrative and well-established Atlantic slave trade. He began trading in African slaves in 1822, and by 1839 he controlled a network that fed Cuba, the United States and Brazil with slaves for plantations. Blanco expanded his operation by establishing a working relationship with the local ruler, African King Siaka of Gallinas (Vai).

He eventually had agents stationed at Cape Mount, Shebar, Digby, Nuevo Sestos and elsewhere. Blanco entered a partnership with one Lino Carballo, with a center of operations in Havana and other branches in Puerto Rico, Trinidad, and the Republic of Texas. His mercantile standing was so high that his credit bills were enthusiastically accepted in New York City, London and many other well-known financial centers.

In Lomboko, Blanco built himself a private kingdom with storehouses on an island, his office on another island, and houses for his African wives on yet a third island. Slaves awaiting shipment were housed on the islands of Taro and Kamasun. In 1838, Blanco left Africa for Cuba and went to Barcelona, all the time trading in slaves. He left Gallinas just before most of the La Amistad Africans reached his stockades, but he left behind a network of employees to continue his business. It is likely that some of them handled the Amistad Africans. At any rate, he played a vital part in the development of the slave trade in this region. Due to military pressure from the United Kingdom, Blanco's business finally collapsed in 1848, and in 1854 he died in Genoa. His last living grandchild is Matias Blanco, who resides in Miami, Florida.

== Popular culture ==
Spanish actor and writer Carlos Bardem wrote a novel about Pedro Blanco called Mongo Blanco and was published by Plaza & Janés in 2019.
