= Joseph Cinqué =

West African captive and leader of La Amistad slave revolt in 1839

Sengbe Pieh
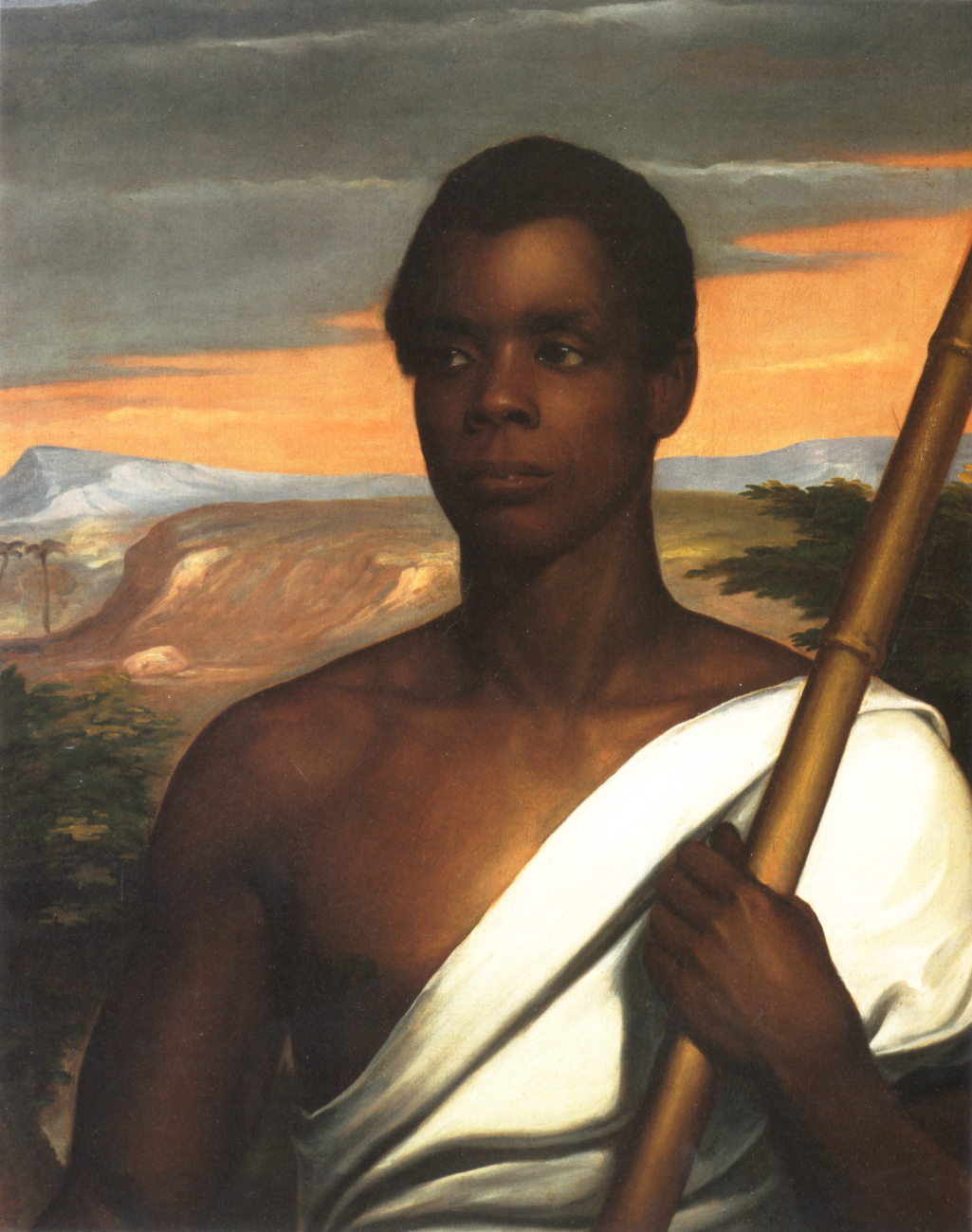
- Cinqué in 1840
- Born: c. 1814; British Sierra Leone
- Died: c. 1879 (aged around 65); Sierra Leone, British West Africa
- Other name: Joseph Cinque
- Known for: Amistad case

Sengbe Pieh (c. 1814 – c. 1879), also known as Joseph Cinqué or Cinquez and sometimes referred to mononymously as Cinqué, was a West African man of the Mende people who led a revolt of many Africans on the Spanish slave ship La Amistad in July 1839. After the ship was taken into custody by the US Revenue-Marine, Cinqué and his fellow Africans were eventually tried for mutiny and killing officers on the ship, in a case known as United States v. The Amistad. This reached the U.S. Supreme Court, where Cinqué and his fellow Africans were found to have rightfully defended themselves from being enslaved through the illegal Atlantic slave trade and were released. The US government did not provide any aid to the acquitted Mende People. The United Missionary Society, a black group founded by James W.C. Pennington, helped raise money for the return of thirty-five of the survivors to Sierra Leone in 1842.

== Biography ==
Cinqué was born around 1814 in what is now Sierra Leone. His exact date of birth remains unknown. He was a rice farmer, and married with three children, when he was sold into slavery to redeem a debt. He was bought by the Vai king Siaka and in 1839 sold to Pedro Blanco, a Spanish slave trader. He was imprisoned on the Portuguese slave ship Tecora, in violation of treaties prohibiting the international slave trade. Cinqué was taken to Havana, Cuba, where he was sold with 110 others to Spaniards José Ruiz and Pedro Montez.

The Spaniards arranged to transport the captives on the coastal schooner La Amistad, with the intention of selling them as slaves at ports along the coast of Cuba for work on sugar plantations. On June 30, Cinqué led a revolt, killing the captain and the cook of the ship; two African captives also died, and two sailors escaped. The Africans took Ruiz and Montez, the merchants who had purchased them, as prisoners and demanded that they direct the ship back to Sierra Leone. Instead, at night, the pair directed the navigator in the opposite direction, toward the Americas, in the hope of attracting the attention of one of their fellow Spaniards who would save their ship and regain control. The ship had an uneven course between the coasts of the United States and Africa. After about two months, La Amistad reached United States waters near Long Island, New York. Members of the USS Washington boarded the vessel. When they discovered what had happened (as told by the Spaniards), they charged the Africans with mutiny and murder. The ship and the Mende were taken to New Haven, Connecticut, to await trial.

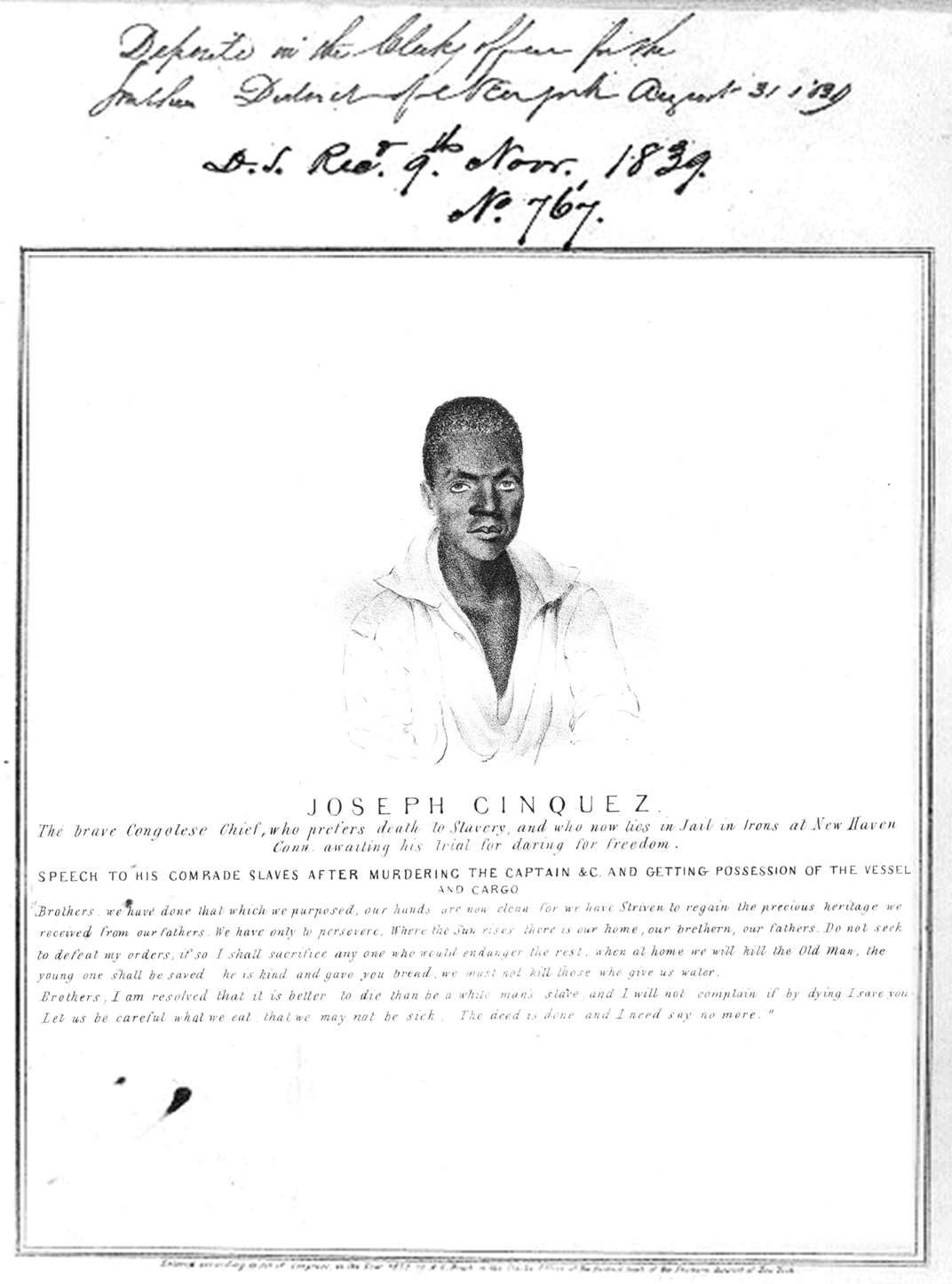
A print of Cinqué that appeared in the New York Sun on August 31, 1839

The two Spaniards claimed that the Africans had been born in Cuba and were already slaves at the time of their purchase, and were therefore legal property. Interpreters from Mende to English were found, who enabled the Africans to tell their story to attorneys and the court. Cinqué served as the group's informal representative.

The district and circuit courts found in favor of the Africans; the Spanish parties and their government appealed to the Supreme Court of the United States. In March 1841, the Supreme Court ruled that the Africans mutinied to regain their freedom after being kidnapped and sold illegally. The advocacy of former U.S. President John Quincy Adams, together with Roger Sherman Baldwin, was critical to the Africans' defense. The court ordered the Africans freed and returned to Africa, if they wished. This decision was against the protests of President Martin Van Buren, who worried about relations with Spain and implications for domestic slavery.

Cinqué and the other Mende reached their homeland in 1842. In Sierra Leone, Cinqué encountered civil war. He and his group maintained contact with the local mission for a while, but Cinqué left to trade along the coast. Little is known of his later life, and rumors circulated. Some maintained that he had moved to Jamaica. Others held that he had become a merchant or a chief, perhaps trading in enslaved people himself.

The latter charge derived from oral accounts from Africa cited by the twentieth-century author William A. Owens, who claimed that he had seen letters from American Missionary Association missionaries suggesting Cinqué was a slave trader. More recently historians such as Howard Jones in 2000 and Joseph Yannielli in 2009 have argued that, although some of the Africans associated with the Amistad probably did engage in the slave trade upon their return, given the nature of the regional economy at the time, the allegations of Cinqué's involvement seem implausible in view of the lack of evidence, and the unlikelihood of a conspiracy of silence leaving no traces.

Samuel Pieh, a great-great-grandson of Sengbe Pieh and language coach for the 1997 Amistad film, stated that Cinqué became a key figure in Sierra Leone and helped to Christianize the country.

== In popular culture ==
- In Amistad, the 1997 film depicting the events of the mutiny and trial, Cinqué was portrayed by the Beninese-American actor Djimon Hounsou in what would prove to be his breakout role.
- A sculpture of Cinqué, depicted at various points throughout the Amistad affair, stands outside City Hall in New Haven, on the former site of the prison in which he and the other Amistad captives were held.
- A golden sculpture of Cinqué is located outside the Old State House in Hartford, Connecticut, where the first part of the Amistad series of trial and appeals was held.
- Robert Hayden's poem Middle Passage incorporates accounts of the revolt on La Amistad and the subsequent trial.
- The likeness of Sengbe Pieh appeared on Sierra Leone's former 5000 leone banknote.
- American composer Anthony Davis wrote an opera, Amistad (1997), based on these events. It premiered at the Lyric Opera of Chicago.
- J. Ivy references Cinqué in his feature on the Kanye West song "Never Let Me Down".

== See also ==
- Amistad (case), about the rebellion and the Supreme Court case United States v. The Amistad
- Amistad (film), a movie about the court case
- Amistad (ship replica)
- Amistad Research Center at Tulane University, New Orleans
- List of slaves
