= James Covey =

Interpreter in the Amistad case

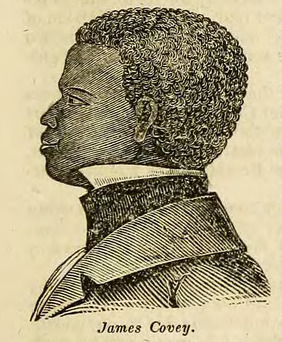
James Covey

James Benjamin Covey (né Kaweli; c. 1825 – 12 October 1850) was a sailor, remembered today chiefly for his role as interpreter during the legal proceedings in the United States federal courts that followed the 1839 revolt aboard the Spanish slave ship La Amistad. Covey, who spoke Mende and English, was instrumental for enabling the Mende passengers of the Amistad to communicate with the court and to defend themselves successfully against charges of mutiny and murder.

== Early life ==
Covey was born circa 1825 or 1826 in the southwestern highlands of what is now Sierra Leone, in West Africa. His African name, Kaweli, means "war road" in Mende. At the age of five or six, he was kidnapped in a raid and sold to the wife of a chief of the Bulom tribe.

Three years later he was sold to a European slaver and probably taken to the Lomboko slave camp before transport to the Americas. At a time when the Atlantic slave trade had already been officially outlawed, Covey was illegally shipped to Cuba on board the Spanish ship Segundo Socorro. That ship was intercepted by the British fleet and the captives, including Covey, were freed.

Covey was put into the care of the Rev. John William Weeks, of the Freetown branch of the Church Missionary Society. He spent five years at school in Freetown before joining the British Royal Navy. In 1838 he joined the crew of HMS Buzzard, where he served under Captain Charles Fitzgerald. Covey arrived in New York City on board Buzzard in June 1839.

== Involvement with the Amistad case ==
Josiah Gibbs, a professor of linguistics at Yale University who was personally committed to the abolition of slavery, sought to assist the legal defense of the Africans who had come into the custody of the U.S. federal courts after their uprising on board La Amistad. To that end, Gibbs learned to count to ten in the language spoken by most of the Africans, which turned out to be Mende. He went around the harbor in New Haven and later in New York, counting aloud, until he was approached by sailors who recognized the words. In this way, Gibbs came into contact with Covey and fellow British sailor Charles Pratt in New York, in October 1839.

Gibbs took both Covey and Pratt to New Haven, where they were housed under the protection of Lewis Tappan and the committee for the defense of the captives of the Amistad. Covey stayed in New Haven for four months, until he had translated the testimonies of three Mende-speaking captives in the Amistad civil trial in Hartford, Connecticut, in 1841. Because of his own experience, Covey was instrumental in interpreting and communicating the details of the kidnapping, terror, and eventual rebellion. Translated testimonies from the Africans participating in the mutiny revealed that the cook of the Amistad taunted the captives, telling them that the crew intended to kill and eat the prisoners. Knowing this motive was crucial in understanding that the captives acted in self-defense. The case was appealed to the U.S. Supreme Court, which ruled in United States v. The Amistad that the captives were not slaves, but freeborn men and had legally defended themselves in gaining their freedom.

== Later life ==
In November 1841, Covey, along with the 35 Africans of the Amistad, who chose to return to Africa, boarded the ship Gentleman for the voyage. Funds had been raised for them from private sources. The Africans were accompanied to Freetown by an American missionary, William Raymond.

Covey appeared to drift in and out of the Christian missionary communities in Sierra Leone. There is some evidence that he became involved with a local warlord and may have participated in a slaving expedition in 1845. After falling ill, he was shuffled back and forth between the village of Kaw-Mendi and the main mission compound, "America". Covey died on 12 October 1850 and was given a Christian burial.

== In popular culture ==
In Steven Spielberg's drama film Amistad (1997), Covey is played by British actor Chiwetel Ejiofor.
