= United States v. The Amistad =

1841 U.S. Supreme Court case on the legality of the Atlantic slave trade

- Supreme Court of the United States

Argued February 22 – March 2, 1841 Decided March 9, 1841
- Full case name: The United States, Appellants, v. The Libellants and Claimants of the schooner Amistad, her tackle, apparel, and furniture, together with her cargo, and the Africans mentioned and described in the several libels and claims, Appellees.
- Citations: 40 U.S. 518 (more) 15 Pet. 518; 10 L. Ed. 826; 1841 U.S. LEXIS 279

Case history
- Prior: United States District Court for the District of Connecticut rules for the Africans; United States appeals to the United States Circuit Court for the District of Connecticut, lower court affirmed; United States appeals to the U.S. Supreme Court
- Subsequent: Africans returned to Africa not by way of the President, but by way of abolitionists; United States Circuit Court for the District of Connecticut dispenses monetary awards mandated by the Supreme Court; United States Circuit Court for the District of Connecticut hears a petition by Ramon Bermejo, in 1845, for the unclaimed monetary sum retained by the court in 1841; petition granted in the amount of $631

Holding
- The Africans are free, and are remanded to be released; Lt. Gedney's claims of salvage are granted, remanded to the United States Circuit Court for the District of Connecticut for further proceedings in monetary manners.

Court membership
- Chief Justice Roger B. Taney Associate Justices Joseph Story · Smith Thompson; John McLean · Henry Baldwin; James M. Wayne · John Catron; John McKinley

Case opinions
- Majority: Story, joined by Taney, Thompson, McLean, Wayne, Catron, McKinley
- Dissent: Baldwin
- Barbour took no part in the consideration or decision of the case.

Laws applied
- Pinckney's Treaty, art. IX; Adams-Onís Treaty

United States v. Schooner Amistad, 40 U.S. (15 Pet.) 518 (1841), was a United States Supreme Court case resulting from the rebellion of Africans on board the Spanish schooner La Amistad in 1839. It was an unusual freedom suit that involved international diplomacy as well as United States law. The historian Samuel Eliot Morison described it in 1969 as the most important court case involving slavery before being eclipsed by that of Dred Scott v. Sandford in 1857.

La Amistad was traveling along the coast of Cuba on her way to a port for re-sale of the slaves. The Africans, Mende people who had been kidnapped in the area of Sierra Leone, in West Africa, illegally sold into slavery and shipped to Cuba, escaped their shackles and took over the ship. They killed the captain and the cook; two other crew members escaped in a lifeboat. The Mende directed the two Spanish navigator survivors to return them to Africa. The crew tricked them by sailing north at night. La Amistad was later apprehended near Long Island, New York, by the United States Revenue-Marine (later renamed the United States Revenue Cutter Service and one of the predecessors of the United States Coast Guard) and taken into custody. The widely publicized court cases in the U.S. federal district court and eventually the Supreme Court in Washington, D.C., in 1841, which addressed international issues, helped the abolitionist movement.

In 1840, a federal district court found that the transport of the kidnapped Africans across the Atlantic Ocean on the Portuguese slave ship Tecora was in violation of U.S. laws against international slave trade. The captives were ruled to have acted as free men when they had fought to escape their kidnapping and illegal confinement. The court ruled the Africans had been entitled to take whatever legal measures necessary to secure their freedom, including the use of force. Under international and Southern sectional pressure, U.S. President Martin Van Buren ordered the case appealed to the Supreme Court. It affirmed the lower district court's ruling on March 9, 1841, and authorized the release of the Mende, but it overturned the additional order of the lower court to return them to Africa at the government's expense. Supporters arranged for temporary housing of the Africans in Farmington, Connecticut, as well as funds for travel. In 1842, the 35 who wanted to return to Africa, together with U.S. Christian missionaries, were transported by ship to Sierra Leone.

== Background ==
=== Rebellion at sea and capture ===
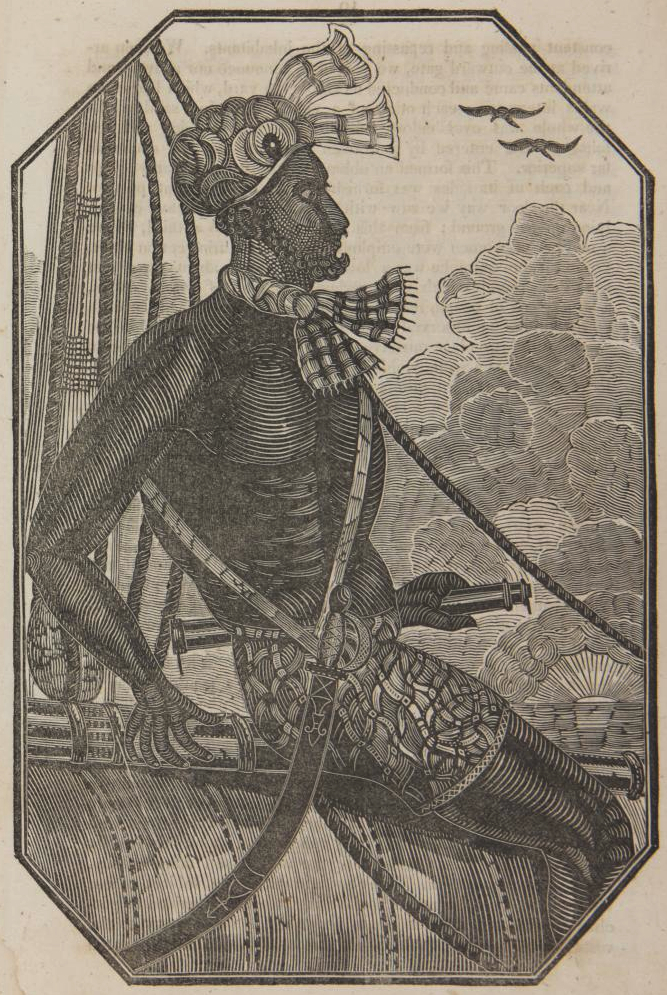
Sengbe Pieh, leader of the La Amistad uprising, pictured as a Muslim (1839). Beinecke Rare Book & Manuscript Library

On June 27, 1839, La Amistad ("Friendship"), a Spanish vessel, departed from the port of Havana, Cuba, for the Province of Puerto Principe, also in Cuba. The masters of La Amistad were Captain Ramón Ferrer, José Ruiz, and Pedro Montes, all Spanish nationals. With Ferrer was Antonio, a man enslaved by Ferrer to serve him personally. Ruiz was transporting 49 Africans, who had been entrusted to him by the governor-general of Cuba. Montez held four additional Africans, also entrusted to him by the governor-general. As the voyage normally took only four days, the crew had brought four days' worth of rations and had not anticipated the strong headwind that slowed the schooner. On July 2, 1839, one of the Africans, Joseph Cinqué, freed himself and the other captives using a file that had been found and kept by a woman who, like them, had been on the Tecora, the Portuguese ship that had transported them illegally as slaves from West Africa to Cuba.

The Mende killed the ship's cook, Celestino, who had told them that they were to be killed and eaten by their captors. The Mende also killed Captain Ferrer, and the armed struggle resulted as well in the deaths of two Africans. Two sailors escaped in a lifeboat. The Mende spared the lives of the two Spaniards who could navigate the ship, José Ruiz and Pedro Montez, if they returned the ship east across the Atlantic Ocean to Africa. They also spared Antonio, a creole, and used him as an interpreter with Ruiz and Montez.

Ruiz and Montez deceived the Africans and steered La Amistad north along the East Coast of the United States, where the ship was sighted repeatedly. They dropped anchor a half-mile off eastern Long Island, New York, on August 26, 1839, at Culloden Point. Some of the Africans went ashore to procure water and provisions from the hamlet of Montauk. The vessel was discovered by USRC Washington, a revenue cutter of the United States Revenue-Marine (later renamed the United States Revenue Cutter Service and one of the predecessors of the United States Coast Guard) while Washington was conducting hydrographic survey work for the United States Coast Survey. Lieutenant Thomas R. Gedney, commanding the cutter, saw some of the Africans on shore and, assisted by his officers and crew, took custody of La Amistad and the Africans.

Taking them to the Long Island Sound port of New London, Connecticut, Lieutenant Gedney presented officials with a written claim for his property rights under international admiralty law for salvage of the vessel, the cargo, and the Africans. Gedney allegedly chose to land in Connecticut because slavery was still technically legal there, under the state's gradual abolition law, unlike in nearby New York State. He hoped to profit from sale of the Africans. Gedney transferred the captured Africans into the custody of the United States District Court for the District of Connecticut, where legal proceedings began.

=== Parties ===
- Lt. Thomas R. Gedney filed a libel (a lawsuit in admiralty law) for salvage rights to the African captives and cargo on board La Amistad as property seized on the high seas.
- Henry Green and Pelatiah Fordham filed a libel for salvage and claimed that they had been the first to discover La Amistad.
- José Ruiz and Pedro Montes filed libels requesting their property of "slaves" and cargo to be returned to them.
- The Office of the United States Attorney for the District of Connecticut, representing the Spanish government, libelled for the "slaves," cargo, and vessel to be returned to Spain as its property.
- Antonio Vega, vice-consul of Spain, libelled for "the slave Antonio" on the grounds that the man was his personal property.
- The Africans denied that they were slaves or property and argued that the court could not "return" them to the control of the government of Spain.
- José Antonio Tellincas, with Aspe and Laca, claimed other goods on board La Amistad.

=== British pressure ===
As the British had entered into a treaty with Spain prohibiting the slave trade north of the equator, they considered it a matter of international law for the United States to release the Africans. The British applied diplomatic pressure to achieve that such as invoking the Treaty of Ghent with the U.S., which jointly enforced their respective prohibitions against the international slave trade.

While the legal battle continued, Dr. Richard Robert Madden, "who served on behalf of the British commission to suppress the African slave trade in Havana," arrived to testify. He made a deposition "that some twenty-five thousand slaves were brought into Cuba every year – with the wrongful compliance of, and personal profit by, Spanish officials." Madden also "told the court that his examinations revealed that the defendants were brought directly from Africa and could not have been residents of Cuba," as the Spanish had claimed. Madden, who later had an audience with Queen Victoria concerning the case, conferred with the British Minister in Washington, D.C., Henry Stephen Fox, who pressured U.S. Secretary of State John Forsyth on behalf "of her Majesty's Government."

Fox wrote:

...Great Britain is also bound to remember that the law of Spain, which finally prohibited the slave-trade throughout the Spanish dominions, from the date of the 30th of May, 1820, the provisions of which law are contained in the King of Spain's royal cedula of the 19th December, was passed, in compliance with a treaty obligation to that effect, by which the Crown of Spain had bound itself to the Crown of Great Britain, and for which a valuable compensation, in return, was given by Great Britain to Spain; as may be seen by reference to the 2d, 3d, and 4th articles of a public treaty concluded between Great Britain and Spain on the 23d of September, 1817.

It is next to be observed, that Great Britain and the United States have mutually engaged themselves to each other, by the 10th article of the treaty of Ghent, to use their best endeavors for the entire abolition of the African slave-trade; and there can be no doubt of the firm intention of both parties religiously to fulfill the terms of that engagement.

Now, the unfortunate Africans whose case is the subject of the present representation, have been thrown by accidental circumstances into the hands of the authorities of the United States Government whether these persons shall recover the freedom to which they are entitled, or whether they shall be reduced to slavery, in violation of known laws and contracts publicly passed, prohibiting the continuance of the African slave-trade by Spanish subjects.

It is under these circumstance that her Majesty's Government anxiously hope that the President of the United States will find himself empowered to take such measures, in behalf of the aforesaid Africans, as shall secure to them the possession of their liberty, to which, without doubt they are by law entitled.

Forsyth responded that under the separation of powers in the U.S. Constitution, the President could not influence the court case. He said that the question of whether the "negroes of the Amistad" had been enslaved in violation of the Treaty was still an open one, "and this Government would with great reluctance erect itself into a tribunal to investigate such questions between two friendly sovereigns." He noted that when the facts were determined, they could be taken into account. He suggested that if the Court found for Spanish rights of property, the Africans would be returned to Cuba. Great Britain and Spain could then argue their questions of law and treaties between them.

=== Spanish argument ===
Secretary of State Forsyth requested from the Spanish minister, Chevalier de Argaiz, "a copy of the laws now in force in the island of Cuba relative to slavery." In response, the Captain General of Cuba sent Argaiz "everything on the subject, which had been determined since the treaty concluded in 1818 between Spain and England." The minister also expressed dismay that the Africans had not already been returned to Spanish control.

The Spanish maintained that none but a Spanish court could have jurisdiction over the case. The minister stated, "I do not, in fact, understand how a foreign court of justice can be considered competent to take cognizance of an offence committed on board of a Spanish vessel, by Spanish subjects, and against Spanish subjects, in the waters of a Spanish territory; for it was committed on the coasts of this island, and under the flag of this nation." The minister noted that the Spanish had recently turned over American sailors "belonging to the crew of the American vessel 'William Engs,'" whom it had tried by request of their captain and the American consul. The sailors had been found guilty of mutiny and sentenced to "four years' confinement in a fortress." Other American sailors had protested, and when the American ambassador raised the issue with the Spaniards, on March 20, 1839, "her Majesty, having taken into consideration all the circumstances, decided that the said seamen should be placed at the disposition of the American consul, seeing that the offence was committed in one of the vessels and under the flag of his nation, and not on shore." The Spaniards asked how if America had demanded that the sailors in an American ship be turned over to them despite being in a Spanish port, they could now try the Spanish mutineers.

The Spaniards held that just as America had ended its importation of African slaves but maintained a legal domestic population, so too had Cuba. It was up to Spanish courts to determine "whether the Negroes in question" were legal or illegal slaves under Spanish law, "but never can this right justly belong to a foreign country."

The Spaniards maintained that even if it was believed that the Africans were being held as slaves in violation of "the celebrated treaty of humanity concluded between Spain and Great Britain in 1835," it would be a violation of "the laws of Spain; and the Spanish Government, being as scrupulous as any other in maintaining the strict observance of the prohibitions imposed on, or the liberties allowed to, its subjects by itself, will severely chastise those of them who fail in their duties."

The Spaniards pointed out that by American law, the jurisdiction over a

vessel on the high seas, in time of peace, engaged in a lawful voyage, is, according to the laws of nations, under the exclusive jurisdiction of the State to which her flag belongs; as much so as if constituting a part of its own domain. ...if such ship or vessel should be forced, by stress of weather, or other unavoidable cause, into the port and under the jurisdiction of a friendly Power, she, and her cargo, and persons on board, with their property, and all the rights belonging to their personal relations as established by the laws of the State to which they belong, would be placed under the protection which the laws of nations extend to the unfortunate under such circumstances.

The Spaniards demanded that the U.S. "apply these proper principles to the case of the schooner Amistad."

The Spanish were further encouraged that their view would win by U.S. Senator John C. Calhoun and the Senate's Committee of Foreign Relations on April 15, 1840, issuing a statement announcing complete "conformity between the views entertained by the Senate, and the arguments urged by the [Spanish Minister] Chevalier de Argaiz" concerning La Amistad.

=== Applicable law ===
The Spanish categorized the Africans as property to have the case fall under Pinckney's Treaty of 1795. They protested when Judge William Jay construed a statement by their Minister as seeming to demand

"the surrender of the negroes apprehended on board the schooner Amistad, as murderers, and not as property; that is to say founding his demand on the law of nations, and not on the treaty of 1795."

The Spanish pointed out that the statement to which Jay was referring was one of the Spanish minister "speaking of the crime committed by the negroes [slave revolt], and the punishment which they merit." They went on to point out that the minister had stated that a payment to compensate the owners "would be a slender compensation; for though the property should remain, as it ought to remain, unimpaired, public vengeance would be frustrated."

Judge Jay took issue with the Spanish minister's request for the Africans to be turned over to Spanish authorities, which seemed to imply that they were fugitives instead of misbehaving property, since the 1795 treaty stated that property should be restored directly to the control of its owners. The Spanish denied that it meant that the minister had waived the contention of them being property.

By insisting that the case fell under the treaty, the Spanish were invoking the Supremacy Clause of the U.S. Constitution, which would put the clauses of the treaty above the state laws of Connecticut or New York, where the ship had been taken into custody

"no one who respects the laws of the country ought to oppose the execution of the treaty, which is the supreme law of the country."

However, at that point the case had already risen out of the states' courts, into federal district court.

The Spanish also sought to avoid talk about the law of nations, as some of their opponents argued that it included a duty by the U.S. to treat the Africans with the same deference as would be accorded any other foreign sailors.

John Quincy Adams would argue that issue before the Supreme Court in 1841:

The Africans were in possession, and had the presumptive right of ownership; they were in peace with the United States: ... they were not pirates; they were on a voyage to their native homes ... the ship was theirs, and being in immediate communication with the shore, was in the territory of the State of New York; or, if not, at least half the number were actually on the soil of New York, and entitled to all the provisions of the law of nations, and the protection and comfort which the laws of that State secure to every human being within its limits.

When pressed with questions concerning the law of nations, the Spanish referred to a concept of Hugo Grotius, who is credited as one of the originators of the law of nations. Specifically, they noted that

"the usage, then, of demanding fugitives from a foreign Government, is confined ... to crimes which affect the Government and such as are of extreme atrocity."

== Initial court proceedings ==
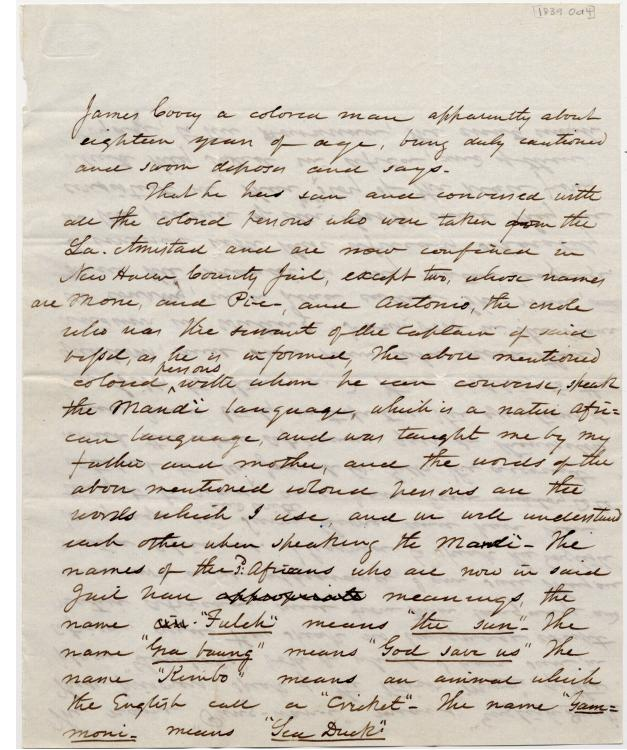
First page of the deposition of James Covey concerning La Amistad prisoners held in the New Haven, Connecticut jail, October 4, 1839.

A case before the circuit court in Hartford, Connecticut, was filed in September 1839, charging the Africans with mutiny and murder on La Amistad. Roger Sherman Baldwin, an attorney from New Haven who had served on that city's town board as well as in the state legislature, represented the Africans.

The court ruled that it lacked jurisdiction, because the alleged acts took place on a Spanish ship in Spanish waters. It was entered into the docket books of the federal court as United States v. Cinque, et al.

Various parties filed property claims with the district court to many of the African captives, to the ship, and to its cargo: Ruiz and Montez, Lieutenant Gedney, and Captain Henry Green (who had met the Africans while on shore on Long Island and claimed to have helped in their capture). The Spanish government asked that the ship, cargo, and African captives be restored to Spain under the Pinckney treaty of 1795 between Spain and the United States. Article 9 of the treaty held that

"all ships and merchandises of what nature soever, which shall be rescued out of the hands of pirates or robbers on the high seas, ... shall be restored, entire, to the true proprietor."

The United States filed a claim on behalf of Spain.

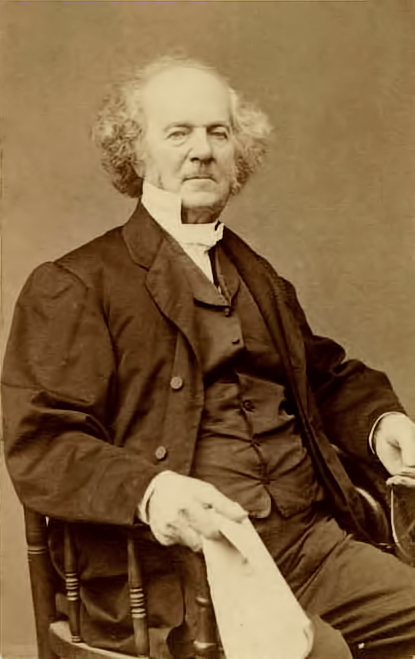
Lewis Tappan, American evangelical abolitionist and founder of the "Amistad committee"

The abolitionist movement had formed the "Amistad Committee," headed by the New York City merchant Lewis Tappan, and had collected money to mount a defense of the Africans. Initially, communication with the Africans was difficult since they spoke neither English nor Spanish. Professor J.W. Gibbs learned from the Africans to count to ten in their Mende language. He went to the docks of New York City and counted aloud in front of sailors until he located a person able to understand and translate. He found James Covey, a twenty-year-old sailor on the British man-of-war HMS Buzzard. Covey was a formerly enslaved person from West Africa.

The abolitionists filed charges of assault, kidnapping, and false imprisonment against Ruiz and Montes. Their arrest in New York City in October 1839 outraged pro-slavery advocates and the Spanish government. Montes immediately posted bail and went to Cuba. Ruiz, being

"more comfortable in a New England setting (and entitled to many amenities not available to the Africans), hoped to garner further public support by staying in jail. ... Ruiz, however, soon tired of his martyred lifestyle in jail and posted bond. Like Montes, he returned to Cuba."

Outraged, the Spanish minister, Cavallero Pedro Alcántara Argaiz, made

"caustic accusations against America's judicial system and continued to condemn the abolitionist affront. Ruiz's imprisonment only added to Alcántara's anger, and Alcántara pressured Forsyth to seek ways to throw out the case altogether."

The Spanish held that the bail bonds that the men had to acquire so that they could leave jail and return to Cuba caused them a grave financial burden, and

"by the treaty of 1795, no obstacle or impediment [to leave the U.S.] should have [been] placed" [in their way].

On January 7, 1840, all of the parties, with the Spanish minister representing Ruiz and Montes, appeared before the U.S. District Court for the District of Connecticut and presented their arguments.

The abolitionists' main argument before the district court was that a treaty between Britain and Spain in 1817 and a subsequent pronouncement by the Spanish government had outlawed the slave trade across the Atlantic. They established that the slaves had been captured in Mendiland (also spelled Mendeland, now Sierra Leone) in Africa, sold to a Portuguese trader in Lomboko (south of Freetown) in April 1839, and taken to Havana illegally on a Portuguese ship. The Africans were victims of illegal kidnapping and so, the abolitionists argued, were not slaves but free to return to Africa. They further argued that the documents for the Africans, provided by the Spanish government of Cuba, falsely identified Africans as slaves who had been in Cuba since before 1820, and hence were considered to have been born there as slaves. They contended that government officials in Cuba criminally condoned the fraudulent classification of the Africans from the Amistad.

Concerned about relations with Spain and his re-election prospects in the South, U.S. President Martin Van Buren, a Democrat, sided with the Spanish position. He ordered the schooner USS Grampus to New Haven Harbor to return the Africans to Cuba immediately after a favorable decision, before any appeals could be decided.

Contrary to Van Buren's plan, the district court, led by judge Andrew T. Judson, ruled in favor of the abolitionists and the Africans' position. In January 1840, Judson ordered for the Africans to be returned to their homeland by the U.S. government, and for one third of La Amistad and its cargo to be given to Lieutenant Gedney as salvage property. (The federal government had outlawed the slave trade between the U.S. and other countries in 1808; an 1818 law, as amended in 1819, provided for the return of all illegally-traded slaves.)

Antonio, the deceased captain's personal slave, was declared the rightful property of the captain's heirs and was ordered restored to Cuba. Contrary to Sterne's 1953 fictional account that describes Antonio willingly returning to Cuba, Smithsonian sources report that he escaped to New York, or to Canada, with the help of an abolitionist group.

In detail, the District Court ruled as follows:

- It rejected the claim of the U.S. Attorney, who argued on behalf of the Spanish minister for the restoration of the "slaves".
- It dismissed the claims of Ruiz and Montez.
- It ordered that the captives be delivered to the custody of the U.S. president for transportation to Africa since they were in fact legally free.
- It allowed the Spanish vice-consul to claim the slave Antonio.
- It allowed Lt. Gedney to claim one third of the property on board La Amistad.
- It allowed Tellincas, Aspe, and Laca to claim one third of the property.
- It dismissed the claims made by Green and Fordham for salvage rights.

The U.S. Attorney for the District of Connecticut, by order of Van Buren, immediately appealed to the U.S. circuit court for the Connecticut district. He challenged every part of the district court's ruling, except the concession of the slave Antonio to the Spanish vice-consul. Tellincas, Aspe, and Laca also appealed to gain a greater portion of the salvage value. Ruiz and Montez and the owners of La Amistad did not appeal.

In April 1840 the Circuit Court of Appeals, in turn, upheld the district court's decision. The U.S. Attorney appealed the federal government's case to the U.S. Supreme Court.

== Arguments before Supreme Court ==
On February 22, 1841, U.S. Attorney General Henry D. Gilpin began the oral argument phase before the Supreme Court. Gilpin first entered into evidence the papers of La Amistad, which stated that the Africans were Spanish property. Gilpin argued that the Court had no authority to rule against the validity of the documents. Gilpin contended that if the Africans were slaves, as indicated by the documents, they must be returned to their rightful owner, the Spanish government. Gilpin's argument lasted two hours.

John Quincy Adams, a former U.S. president who was then a U.S. Representative from Massachusetts, had agreed to argue for the Africans. When it was time for him to argue, he said that he felt ill-prepared. Roger Sherman Baldwin, who had already represented the captives in the lower cases, opened in his place.

Baldwin, a prominent attorney, contended that the Spanish government was trying to manipulate the Supreme Court to return "fugitives." He argued that the Spanish government sought the return of slaves who had been freed by the district court but was not appealing the fact of their having been freed. Covering all the facts of the case, Baldwin spoke for four hours over the course of February 22 and 23. (He was of no relation to the Court's Justice Henry Baldwin.)

Adams rose to speak on February 24. He reminded the Court that it was a part of the judicial branch and not part of the executive. Introducing copies of correspondence between the Spanish government and Secretary of State John Forsyth, he criticized President Van Buren for his assumption of unconstitutional powers in the case:

This review of all the proceedings of the Executive I have made with utmost pain, because it was necessary to bring it fully before your Honors, to show that the course of that department had been dictated, throughout, not by justice but by sympathy – and a sympathy the most partial and injust. And this sympathy prevailed to such a degree, among all the persons concerned in this business, as to have perverted their minds with regard to all the most sacred principles of law and right, on which the liberties of the United States are founded; and a course was pursued, from the beginning to the end, which was not only an outrage upon the persons whose lives and liberties were at stake, but hostile to the power and independence of the judiciary itself.

Adams argued that neither Pinckney's Treaty nor the Adams–Onís Treaty (the latter of which he had negotiated as Secretary of State) applied to the case. Article IX of Pinckney's Treaty referred only to property and did not apply to people. As to The Antelope decision (10 Wheat. 124), which recognized "that possession on board of a vessel was evidence of property," Adams said that did not apply either since the precedent was established prior to the prohibition of the foreign slave trade by the United States. Adams concluded on March 1 after eight-and-a-half hours of speaking. (The Court had taken a recess following the death of Associate Justice Barbour on February 25.)

Attorney General Gilpin concluded oral arguments with a three-hour rebuttal on March 2. The Court retired to consider the case.

== Decision ==
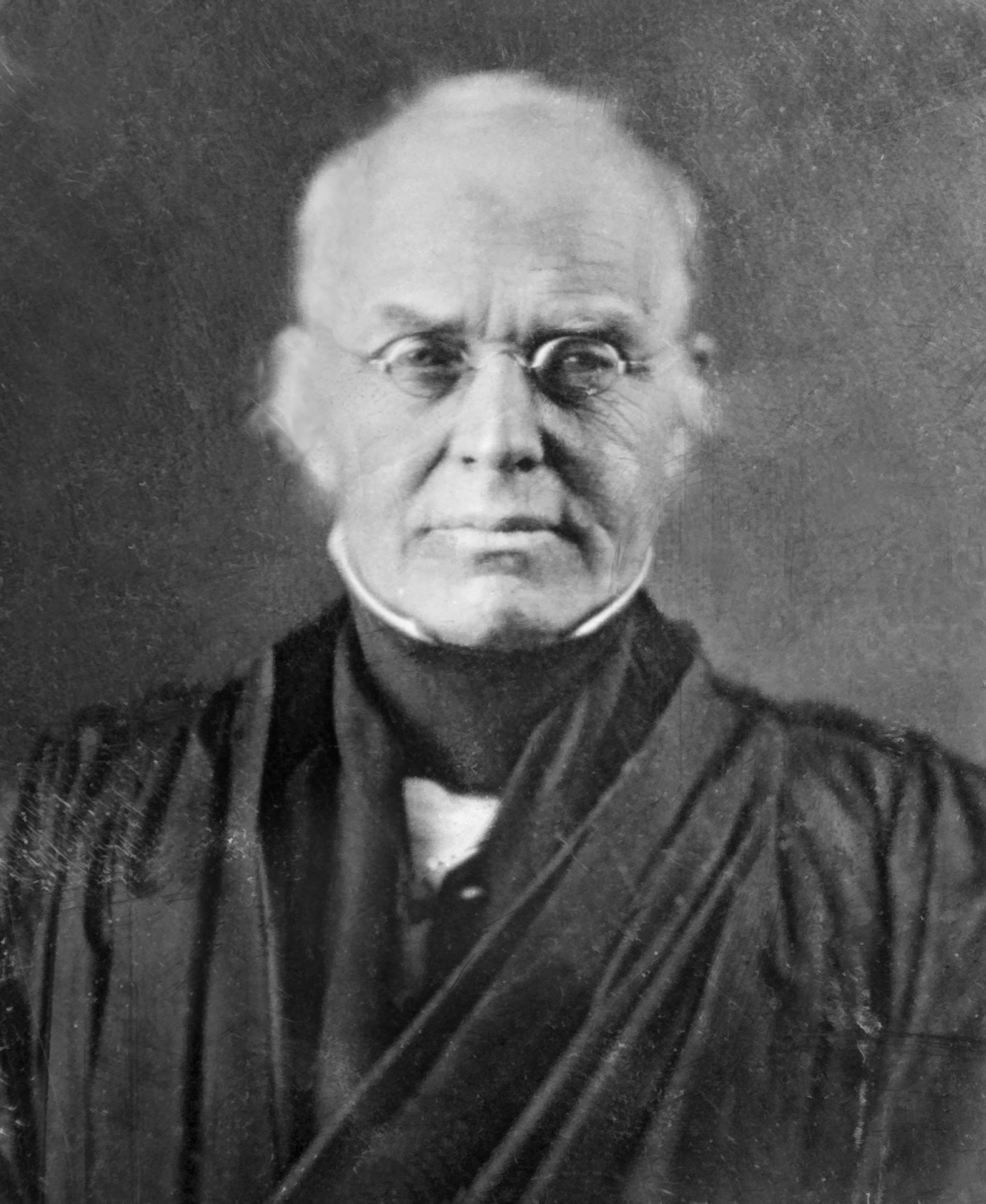
Joseph Story gave the Supreme Court's majority judgment on 9 March 1841.

Associate Justice Joseph Story delivered the Court's decision on March 9. Article IX of Pinckney's Treaty was ruled inapplicable, since the Africans in question had never been legal property. They were not criminals, as the U.S. Attorney's Office argued, but rather

"unlawfully kidnapped, and forcibly and wrongfully carried on board a certain vessel."

The documents submitted by Attorney General Gilpin were evidence not of property but rather of fraud on the part of the Spanish government. Lt. Gedney and the USS Washington were to be awarded salvage from the vessel for having performed "a highly meritorious and useful service to the proprietors of the ship and cargo." When La Amistad anchored near Long Island, however, the Court believed it to be in the possession of the Africans on board, who had never intended to become slaves. Therefore, the Adams-Onís Treaty did not apply and so the President was not required by that law to cover the expense of returning the Africans to Africa.

In his judgment, Story wrote:

It is also a most important consideration, in the present case, which ought not to be lost sight of, that, supposing these African negroes not to be slaves, but kidnapped, and free negroes, the treaty with Spain cannot be obligatory upon them; and the United States are bound to respect their rights as much as those of Spanish subjects. The conflict of rights between the parties, under such circumstances, becomes positive and inevitable, and must be decided upon the eternal principles of justice and international law. If the contest were about any goods on board of this ship, to which American citizens asserted a title, which was denied by the Spanish claimants, there could be no doubt of the right to such American citizens to litigate their claims before any competent American tribunal, notwithstanding the treaty with Spain. A fortiori, the doctrine must apply, where human life and human liberty are in issue, and constitute the very essence of the controversy. The treaty with Spain never could have intended to take away the equal rights of all foreigners, who should contest their claims before any of our courts, to equal justice; or to deprive such foreigners of the protection given them by other treaties, or by the general law of nations. Upon the merits of the case, then, there does not seem to us to be any ground for doubt, that these negroes ought to be deemed free; and that the Spanish treaty interposes no obstacle to the just assertion of their rights. ...

When the Amistad arrived, she was in possession of the negroes, asserting their freedom; and in no sense could they possibly intend to import themselves here, as slaves, or for sale as slaves. In this view of the matter, that part of the decree of the district court is unmaintainable, and must be reversed.

The view which has been thus taken of this case, upon the merits, under the first point, renders it wholly unnecessary for us to give any opinion upon the other point, as to the right of the United States to intervene in this case in the manner already stated. We dismiss this, therefore, as well as several minor points made at the argument. ...

Upon the whole, our opinion is, that the decree of the circuit court, affirming that of the district court, ought to be affirmed, except so far as it directs the negroes to be delivered to the president, to be transported to Africa, in pursuance of the act of the 3rd of March 1819; and as to this, it ought to be reversed: And that the said negroes be declared to be free, and be dismissed from the custody of the court, and go without delay.

== Aftermath and significance ==
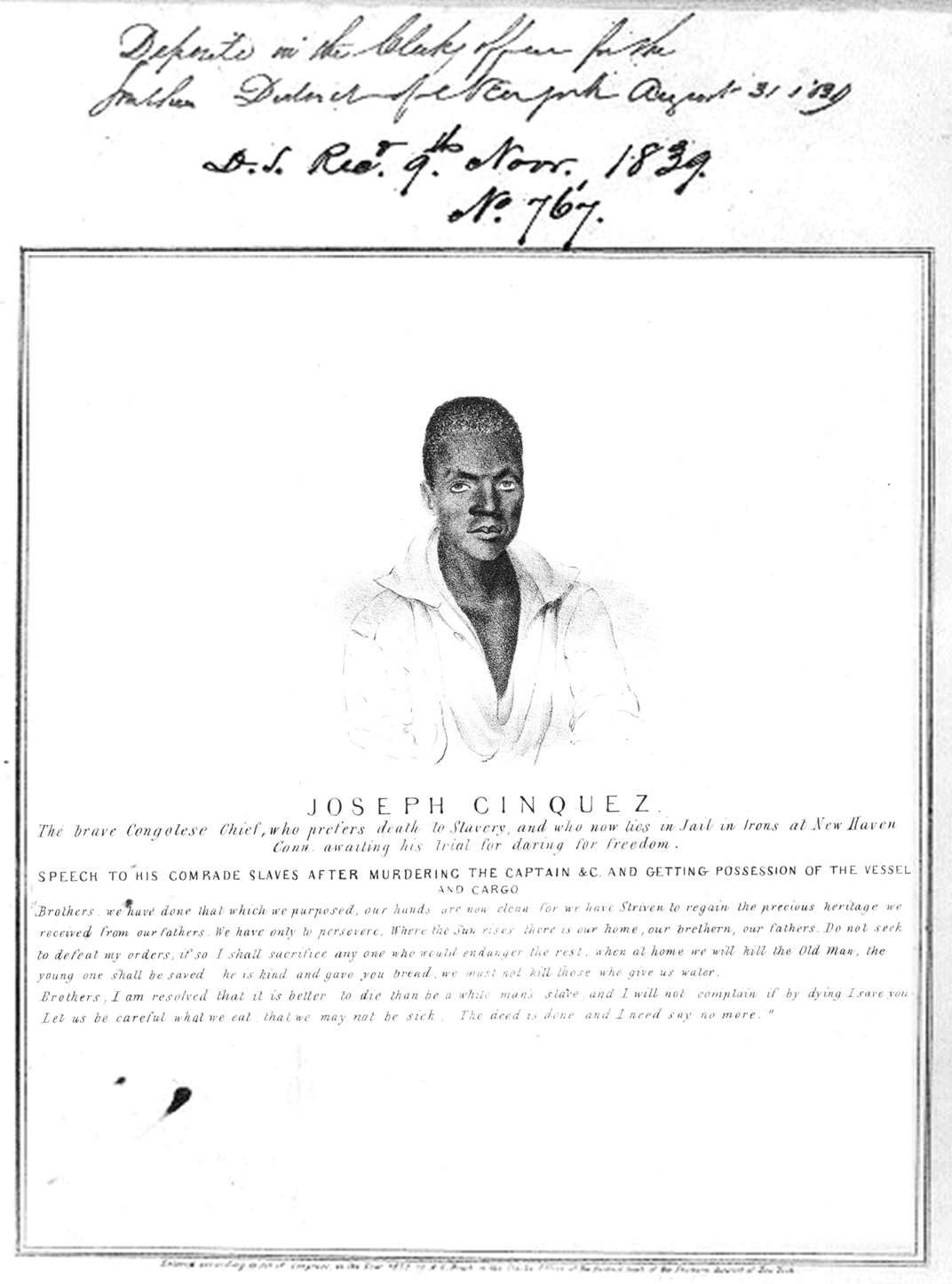
A print of Cinqué that appeared in the New York Sun on August 31, 1839

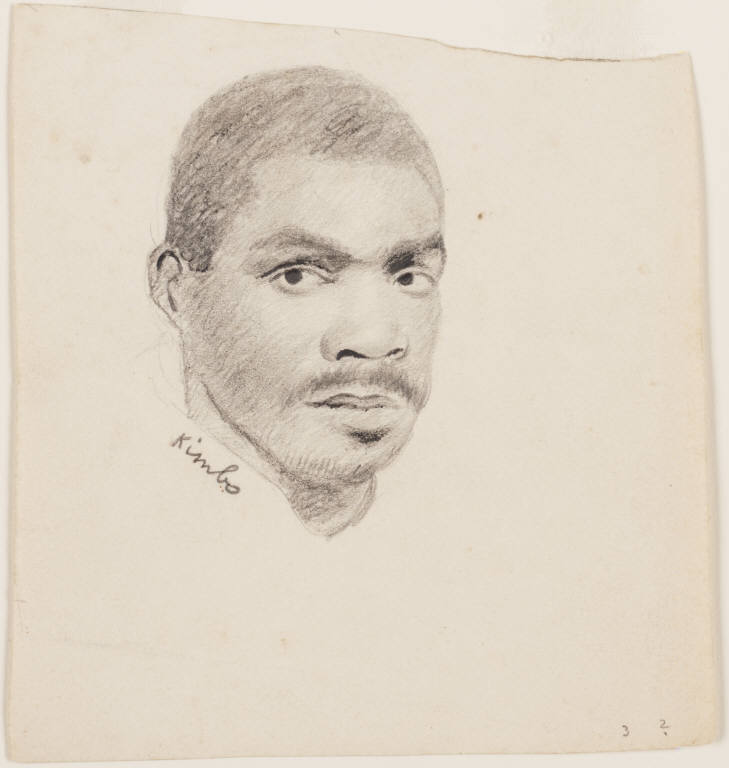
Portrait of Kimbo, one of 36 men aboard La Amistad, c. 1839–1840

The Africans greeted the news of the Supreme Court's decision with joy. Abolitionist supporters took the survivors – 36 men and boys and three girls – to Farmington, Connecticut, a village considered "Grand Central Station" on the Underground Railroad. Its residents had agreed to have the Africans stay there until they could return to their homeland. Some households took them in; supporters also provided barracks for them.

The Amistad Committee instructed the Africans in English and Christianity, and raised funds to pay for their return home. One missionary was James Steele, an Oberlin graduate, previously one of the Lane Rebels. In 1841, he joined the Amistad Mission to Mendhi, which returned freed slaves to Africa and worked to establish a mission there. However, Steele soon found that the Amistad captives belonged to seven different tribes, some at war with one another. All of the chiefs were slave traders and authorized to re-enslave freed persons. These findings led to the decision that the mission must start in Sierra Leone, under the protection of the British.

Along with several missionaries, in 1842, the surviving 35 Africans returned to Sierra Leone, the others having died at sea or while awaiting trial. The Americans constructed a mission in Mendiland. Former members of the Amistad Committee later founded the American Missionary Association, an integrated evangelical organization that continued to support both the Mendi mission and the abolitionist movement.

In the following years, the Spanish government continued to press the U.S. for compensation for the ship, cargo, and slaves. Several Southern lawmakers introduced resolutions into the United States Congress to appropriate money for such payment but failed to gain passage, although it was supported by presidents James K. Polk and James Buchanan.

Joseph Cinqué returned to Africa. In his final years, he was reported to have returned to the mission and re-embraced Christianity. Recent historical research suggests that the allegations of Cinqué's later involvement in the slave trade are false.

In the Creole case of 1841, the United States dealt with another ship rebellion similar to that of La Amistad.

The U.S. had prohibited the international slave trade in 1808, but ended domestic slavery only in 1865 with the Thirteenth Amendment. Connecticut had a gradual abolition law passed in 1797; children born to slaves were free but had to serve apprenticeships until young adulthood; the last slaves were freed in 1848.

=== In popular culture ===
In 1998, a memorial was installed at the Montauk Point Lighthouse to commemorate the Amistad.

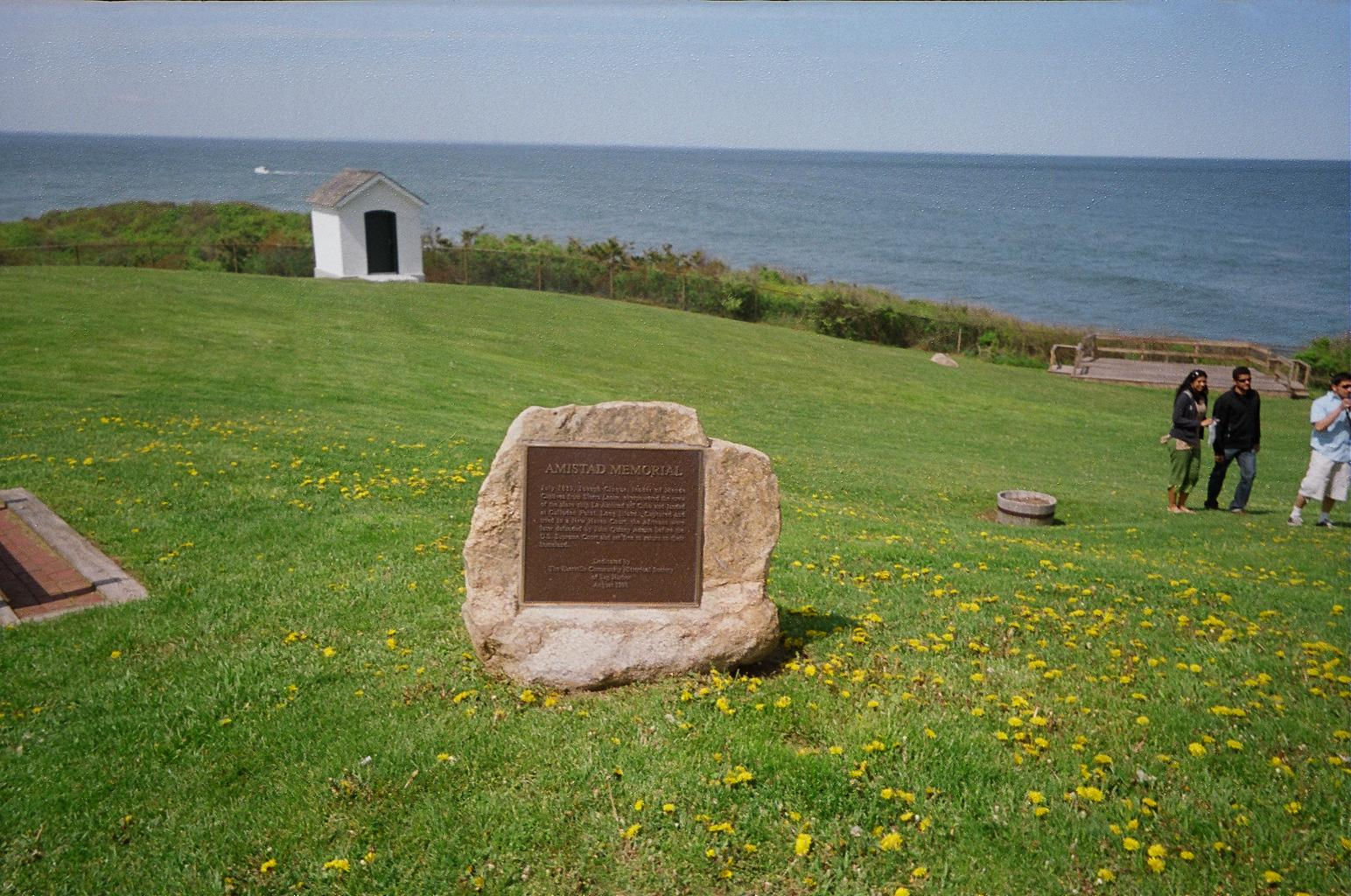
Amistad memorial at Montauk Point Lighthouse on Long Island.

On August 26, 2023, the Montauk Historical Society, together with the Eastville Community Historical Society and the Southampton African-American Museum, erected a historic marker near Culloden Point in Montauk where the Amistad was anchored in 1839.

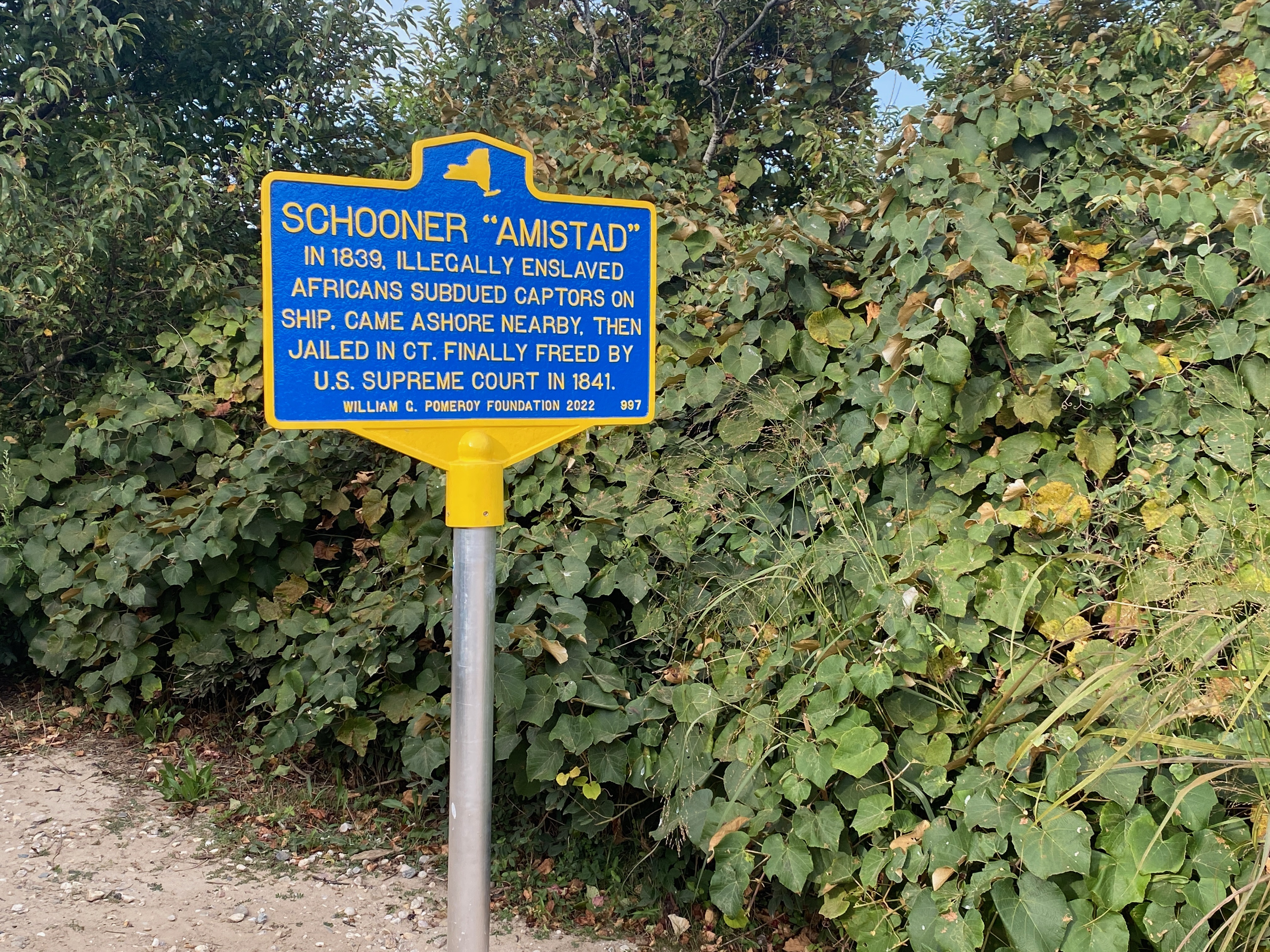

The revolt aboard La Amistad, the background of the slave trade and its subsequent trial is retold in a celebrated poem by Robert Hayden entitled "Middle Passage", first published in 1962. Howard Jones published Mutiny on the Amistad: The Saga of a Slave Revolt and Its Impact on American Abolition, Law, and Diplomacy in 1987.

A movie, Amistad (1997), was based on the events of the revolt and court cases, and Howard Jones' 1987 book Mutiny on the Amistad.

African-American artist Hale Woodruff painted murals portraying events related to the revolt on La Amistad in 1938, for Talladega College in Alabama. A statue of Cinqué was erected beside the City Hall building in New Haven, Connecticut in 1992. There is an Amistad memorial at Montauk Point State Park on Long Island.

In 2000, Freedom Schooner Amistad, a ship replica, was launched in Mystic, Connecticut. The Historical Society of Farmington, Connecticut offers walking tours of village houses that housed the Africans while funds were collected for their return home. The Amistad Research Center at Tulane University in New Orleans, Louisiana, has numerous resources for research into slavery, abolition, and African Americans.

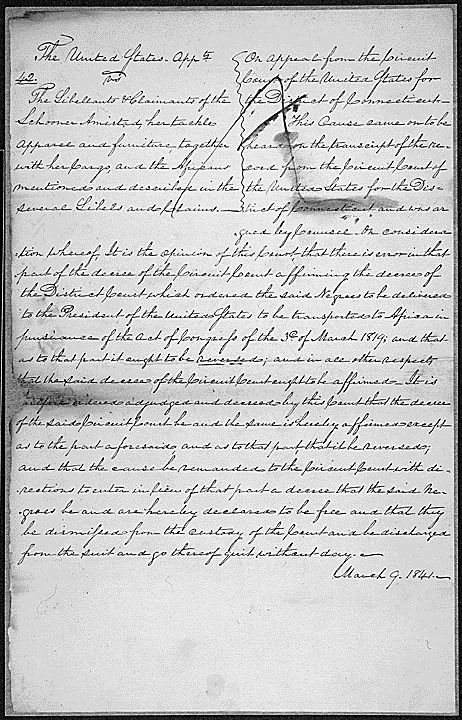
Senior Justice Joseph Story wrote and read the decision of the Court. The Supreme Court ruled that the Africans on board La Amistad were free individuals. Kidnapped and transported illegally, they had never been slaves. The decision affirmed that "... it was the ultimate right of all human beings in extreme cases to resist oppression and to apply force against ruinous injustice." The Court ordered the immediate release of the Amistad Africans.

== See also ==
- Amistad Research Center
- American slave court cases
- John Quincy Adams and abolitionism
- Mendi Bible
