= Tecora =

Portuguese slave ship in the early 19th century

Tecora war ship
General characteristics
- Length: 100 ft
- Sail plan: Brig

Tecora was a Portuguese slave ship of the early 19th century. The brig was built especially for the slave trade although the transport across the Atlantic of human beings as slaves had already been outlawed by several nations in international treaties in the first decade of the 19th century. She was fast and maneuverable in order to evade British patrols that attempted to stop such illegal slave ships off the coast of Africa.

In 1839, a group of Africans were kidnapped from Mendiland (in modern-day Sierra Leone) and transported to the African slave port of Lomboko. There, a slave trader purchased about 500 of the Africans and transported them aboard Tecora to Havana, Cuba.

== Conditions ==
The captives were stripped, chained in groups of five, and packed tightly into the slave hold (a deck below the main deck and above the cargo hold) so that one person's head, when lying in rows, was forced upon another person's thigh. In the ship's dark hold, each slave had 3 feet 3 inches (1 m) of headroom during the ten-week voyage. The captives were sometimes brought up on deck and fed rice. Those who tried to starve themselves, as often happened, were whipped and forced to eat. While they were at sea, water supplies ran low, and disease spread through the closely packed, unventilated slave deck. At times when supplies ran low, the crew would chain 30 to 40 slaves together, attach a heavy weight to the end, and throw the weight overboard, which would drag the chains and the slaves underwater, drowning them. Nearly a third of the slaves died during the long voyage from disease, malnutrition, and beatings.

Since importing slaves into Spanish-controlled Cuba was illegal, the slave traders smuggled the captive Africans ashore at night in small boats. They landed them in a small inlet a few miles from Havana. Once on land, the slaves were placed in a barracoon, or a "slave pen."

Under Spanish law, once they arrived in Cuba in late June, the Africans were legally free. But they were fraudulently classified as Cuban-born slaves so they could be separated and sold. Two Spanish plantation owners, Jose Ruiz and Pedro Montes, bought 53 of the surviving Africans: 49 men, a boy, and three girls. Ruiz and Montes packed their cargo and the slaves on board the schooner La Amistad and set sail for their plantation at Puerto del Príncipe, Cuba.

During the voyage, the slaves rebelled and killed the crew, sparing Ruiz and Montes in the hopes of forcing their former captors to return them to Africa. Instead, the Spanish navigated the ship at night along the United States coast, and they were intercepted by an American naval cutter off the coast of Long Island. The Mende were imprisoned as mutineers in New London, Connecticut. After a drawn-out legal affair that reached the United States Supreme Court, the Africans, represented by American abolitionist attorneys (including former President John Quincy Adams) won their freedom in 1841. Some 35 survivors chose to return to Africa, and their voyage in 1842 was paid by private funds raised by various sources, including a black religious organization from Brooklyn, New York. They were accompanied by a missionary and James Covey, an African sailor in the British navy who had served as interpreter.
