= Lomboko =

Slave factory in the coast of modern day Sierra Leone

Coordinates: 7°0′52″N 11°37′29″W

Lomboko was a slave factory in what is today Sierra Leone, controlled by the Spanish slave trader Pedro Blanco. It consisted of several large depots or barracoons for slaves brought from the interior, as well as several palatial buildings for Blanco to house his wives, concubines, and employees.

Lomboko was built on several small islands at the mouth of the Gallinas River, near Sulima on the Gallinas coast. Spanish slave merchants controlled the area, within the British colony of Sierra Leone. By 1839, about 2,000 enslaved people per year were coming out of the Gallinas River, despite the slave trade being illegal. In 1849, an expedition of the Royal Navy's slavery-fighting West Africa Squadron attacked Lomboko: the Royal Marines freed the slaves and then destroyed the fortress.

== Legacy ==
The fortress plays a prominent part in the Steven Spielberg film Amistad. The movie shows the main character, Joseph Cinqué, as well as other slaves, being captured and brought to Lomboko, and their cruel treatment thereafter. The slave liberation and destruction of the fortress is portrayed in the film's climax.

== See also ==
- Atlantic slave trade

https://www.ghostsofamistad.com/wp-content/uploads/2021/01/Amistad-Epilogue.pdf
