= La Amistad =

1839 slave-ship takeover

Coordinates: 41.361°N 71.966°W

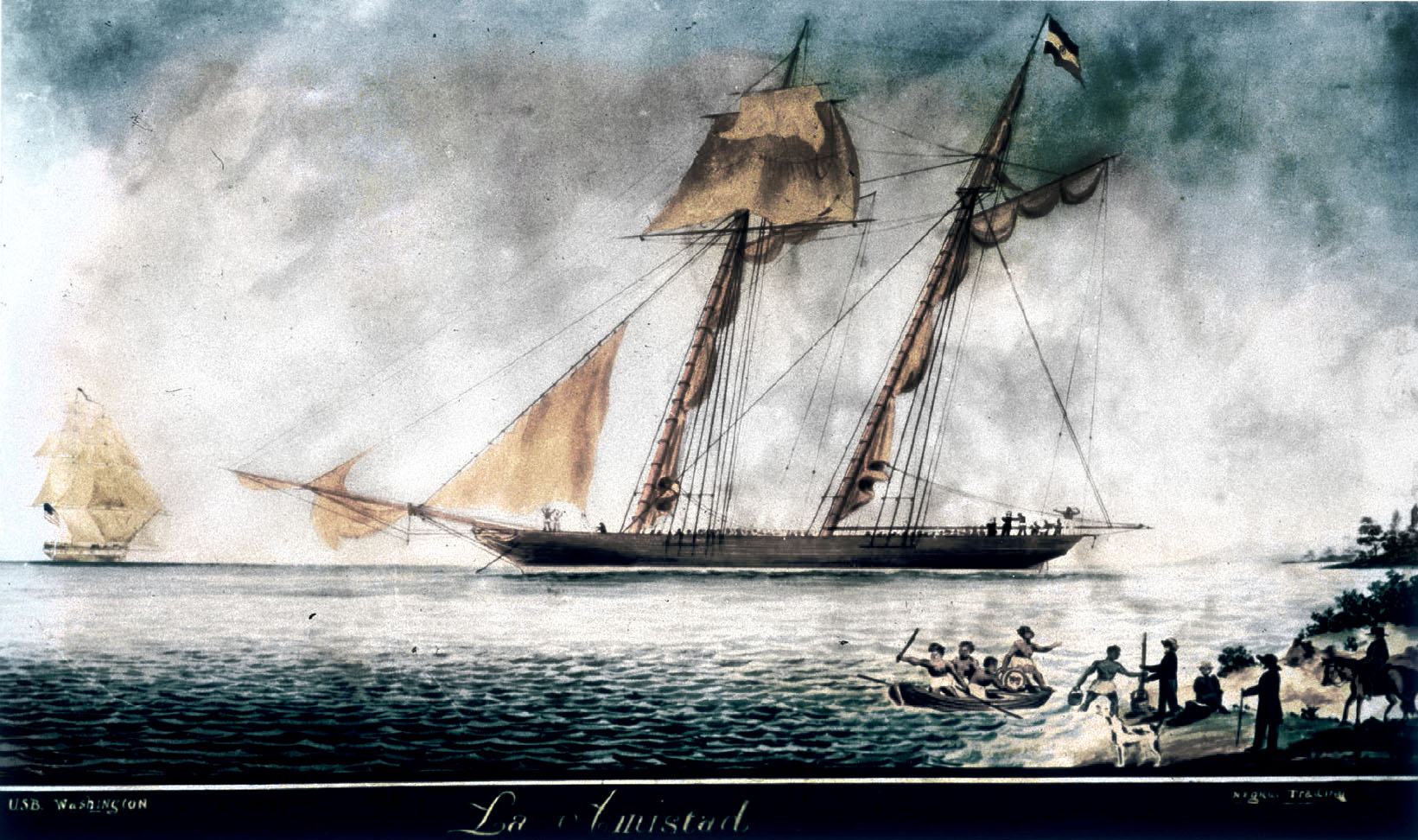
- La Amistad off Culloden Point, Long Island, New York on August 26, 1839 (contemporary painting, artist unknown)

Spain
- Name: La Amistad
- Owner: Ramón Ferrer
- Acquired: Pre-June 1839
- Out of service: July 1839
- Captured: July 1839 (seized from crew during slave revolt); August 1839 (boarded by USS Washington)
- Fate: Held by the U.S. government during US v. The Amistad, auctioned off October 1840

United States
- Name: Ion
- Namesake: Ion (mythology)
- Owner: Captain George Hawford, Newport, Rhode Island
- Acquired: October 1840
- Out of service: 1844
- Fate: Sold to French private buyer

France
- Acquired: 1844

General characteristics
- Length: 120 ft (37 m)
- Sail plan: Schooner

La Amistad (Spanish: [la amisˈtað]; Spanish for "The Friendship") was a 19th-century two-masted schooner owned by a Spaniard living in Cuba. It became renowned in July 1839 for a slave revolt by Mende captives who had been captured and sold to European slave traders and illegally transported by a Portuguese ship from West Africa to Cuba, in violation of European treaties against the Atlantic slave trade. Spanish plantation owners Don José Ruiz and Don Pedro Montes bought 53 captives in Havana, Cuba, including four children, and were transporting them on the ship to their plantations near Puerto Príncipe (modern Camagüey, Cuba). The revolt began after Sengbe Pieh (also known as Joseph Cinqué) unshackled himself and the others on the third day. They took control of the ship, killing the captain and the cook. Two Africans were also killed in the melee.

Pieh ordered Ruiz and Montes to sail to Africa. Instead, they sailed north up the east coast of the United States, sure that the ship would be intercepted and the Africans returned to Cuba as slaves. The revenue cutter Washington seized La Amistad off Montauk Point on Long Island, New York. Pieh and his group escaped the ship but were caught offshore by citizens. They were incarcerated in New Haven, Connecticut on charges of murder and piracy. The man who captured Pieh and his group claimed them as property. La Amistad was towed to New London, Connecticut, and those remaining on board were arrested. None of the 43 survivors on the ship spoke English, so they could not explain what had taken place. Eventually, language professor Josiah Gibbs found James Covey to act as interpreter, and they learned of the abduction.

Two lawsuits were filed. The first case was brought by the Washington ship officers over salvage property claims, and the second case charged the Spanish with enslaving Africans. Spain requested President Martin Van Buren to return the African captives to Cuba under international treaty.

Because of issues of ownership and jurisdiction, the case gained international attention as United States v. The Amistad (1841). The case was finally decided by the Supreme Court of the United States in favor of the Mende people, restoring their freedom. It became a symbol in the United States in the movement to abolish slavery.

== Description ==
La Amistad was a 19th-century two-masted schooner of about 120 feet (37 m). In 1839 it was owned by Ramón Ferrer, a Spanish national. Strictly speaking, La Amistad was not a typical slave ship, as it was not designed like others to traffic massive numbers of enslaved Africans, nor did it engage in the Middle Passage of Africans to the Americas. The ship engaged in the shorter, domestic coastwise trade around Cuba and islands and coastal nations in the Caribbean. The primary cargo carried by La Amistad was sugar-industry products. It carried a limited number of passengers and enslaved Africans being trafficked for delivery or sale around the island.

== History ==
=== 1839 slave revolt ===
La Amistad revolt
- Part of Atlantic slave trade
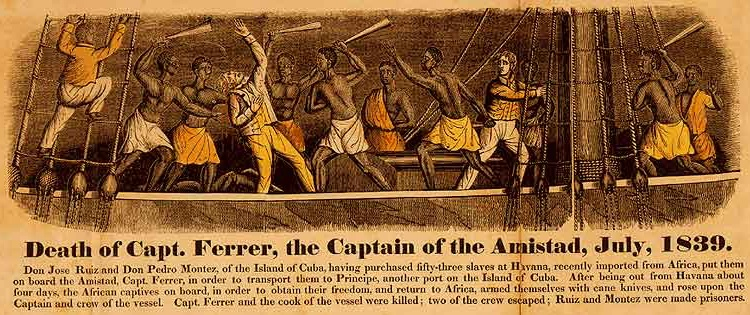
- 1840 engraving depicting the Amistad revolt
Date	c. July 1, 1839
Location	Atlantic Ocean
Result	Pyrrhic succeess; Ship is diverted to New York

Commanders and leaders
Joseph Cinqué	Ramón Ferrer †

Strength
53 (49 adults)	5 crew 2 passengers

Casualties and losses
2 killed	2 killed

Captained by Ferrer, La Amistad left Havana on June 28, 1839, for the small port of Guanaja, near Puerto Príncipe, Cuba, with some general cargo and 53 African captives bound for the sugar plantation where they were to be delivered. These 53 Mende captives (49 adults and four children) had been captured by African slave catchers or otherwise enslaved in Mendiland (in modern-day Sierra Leone), sold to European slave traders and illegally transported from Africa to Havana, mostly aboard the Portuguese slave ship Teçora, to be sold in Cuba. Although the United States and Britain had banned the Atlantic slave trade, Spain had not abolished the trade in its colonies. The crew of La Amistad, lacking purpose-built slave quarters, placed half the captives in the main hold and the other half on deck. The captives were relatively free to move about, which aided their revolt and commandeering of the vessel. In the main hold below decks, the captives found a rusty file and sawed through their manacles.

On about July 1, once free, the men below quickly went up on deck. Armed with machete-like cane knives, they attacked the crew, successfully gaining control of the ship, under the leadership of Sengbe Pieh (later known in the United States as Joseph Cinqué). They killed the captain Ferrer as well as the ship's cook Celestino; two captives also died, and two sailors Manuel Pagilla and Jacinto escaped in a small boat. Ferrer's slave/mulatto cabin boy Antonio was spared, as were José Ruiz and Pedro Montes, the two alleged owners of the captives, so that they could guide the ship back to Africa. While the Mende demanded to be returned home, the navigator Montes deceived them about the course, maneuvering the ship north along the North American coast until they reached the eastern tip of Long Island, New York.

Several New York pilot boats came across La Amistad as on August 21, 1839, when she was discovered thirty miles southeast of Sandy Hook by the pilot-boat Blossom who supplied the men with water and bread. When they attempted to board the pilot-boat to escape, the pilot-boat cut the rope that was attached to La Amistad. The pilots then communicated what they felt was a slave ship to the Collector of the Port of New York. Two days later, the Gratitude pilot boat came across La Amistad when she was twenty-five miles east of Fire Island. When Captain Seaman of the Gratitude wanted to put a pilot aboard, one of the ringleaders of La Amistad ordered the men to fire on the Gratitude. Gun shots hit the pilot boat but she was able to escape.

Discovered by the naval brig USS Washington while on surveying duties, La Amistad was taken into United States custody. By the time of their trial, six of the captives had died.

==== Court case ====
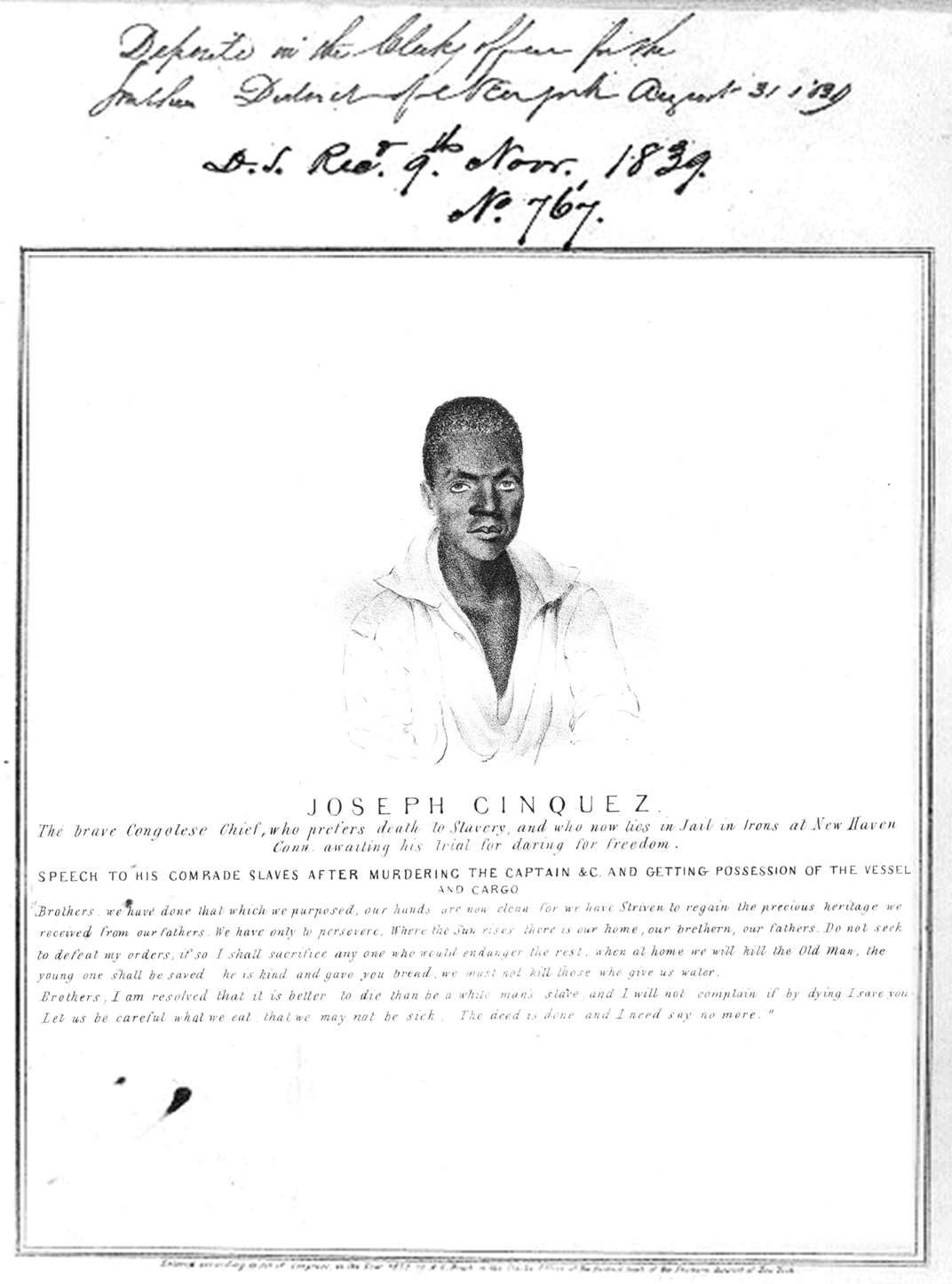
A print of Cinqué that appeared in The Sun on August 31, 1839

The Washington officers brought the first case to federal district court over salvage claims, while the second case began in a Connecticut court after the state arrested the Spanish traders on charges of enslaving free Africans. The Spanish foreign minister, however, demanded that La Amistad and its cargo be released from custody and the Mende captives sent to Cuba for punishment by Spanish authorities. The Van Buren administration accepted the Spanish crown's argument, but Secretary of State John Forsyth explained that the President could not order the release of La Amistad and its cargo because the executive could not interfere with the judiciary under American law. He also could not release the Spanish traders from imprisonment in Connecticut because that would constitute federal intervention in a matter of state jurisdiction. Abolitionists Joshua Leavitt, Lewis Tappan, and Simeon Jocelyn formed the Amistad Committee to raise funds for the defense of La Amistad's captives. Roger Sherman Baldwin, grandson of Roger Sherman and a prominent abolitionist, represented the captives in the New Haven court to decide the fate of the Mende people. Baldwin and former President John Quincy Adams argued the case before the Supreme Court which ruled in favor of the Africans.

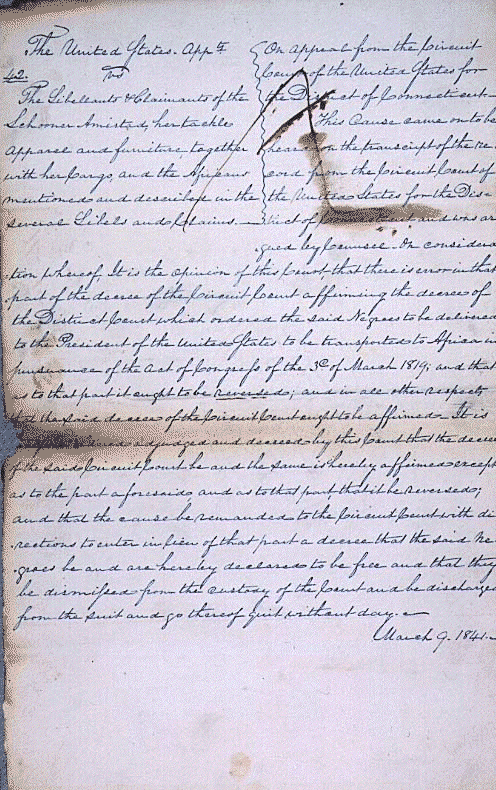
Text of the Amistad Supreme Court decision

A widely publicized court case ensued in New Haven to settle legal issues about the ship and the status of the Mende captives. They were at risk of execution if convicted of mutiny, and they became a popular cause among abolitionists in the United States. Since 1808, the United States and Britain had prohibited the international slave trade. In order to avoid the international prohibition on the African slave trade, the ship's owners fraudulently described the Mende as having been born in Cuba and said that they were being sold in the Spanish domestic slave trade. The court had to determine if the Mende were to be considered salvage and thus the property of naval officers who had taken custody of the ship (as was legal in such cases), the property of the Cuban buyers, or the property of Spain, as Queen Isabella II claimed. A question was whether the circumstances of the capture and transport of the Mende meant that they were legally free and had acted as free men rather than slaves.

Judges ruled in favor of the Africans in the district and circuit courts, and the case United States v. The Amistad reached the US Supreme Court on appeal. In 1841, it ruled that the Mende people had been illegally transported and held as slaves, and they had rebelled in self-defense. It ordered them freed. The US government did not provide any aid, but 35 survivors returned to Africa in 1842, aided by funds raised by the United Missionary Society, a black group founded by James W. C. Pennington. He was a Congregational minister and fugitive slave in Brooklyn, New York, who was active in the abolitionist movement. The Spanish government claimed that the Mende people were Spanish citizens not of African origin. This created tension among the U.S. government, the Spanish crown, and the British government, which had outlawed the slave trade in the British Empire with the Slave Trade Act 1807 and had recently abolished slavery in the British Empire with the Slavery Abolition Act 1833.

=== Later years ===
La Amistad had been moored at the wharf behind the US Custom House in New London, Connecticut for a year and a half, and it was auctioned off by the U.S. Marshal in October 1840. Captain George Hawford of Newport, Rhode Island purchased the vessel and then needed an act of Congress passed to register it. He renamed it Ion. In late 1841, he sailed Ion to Bermuda and Saint Thomas with a typical New England cargo of onions, apples, live poultry, and cheese.

Hawford sold Ion in Guadeloupe in 1844. There is no record of what became of it under the new French owners in the Caribbean.

== Legacy ==
The Amistad Memorial stands in front of New Haven City Hall and County Courthouse in New Haven, Connecticut, where many of the events occurred related to the affair in the United States.

The Amistad Research Center at Tulane University, New Orleans, Louisiana is devoted to research about slavery, abolition, civil rights, and African Americans; it commemorates the revolt of Mende people on the ship by the same name. A collection of portraits of La Amistad survivors is held in the collection of Yale University, drawn by William H. Townsend during the survivors' trial.

=== Replica ===
Freedom Schooner Amistad
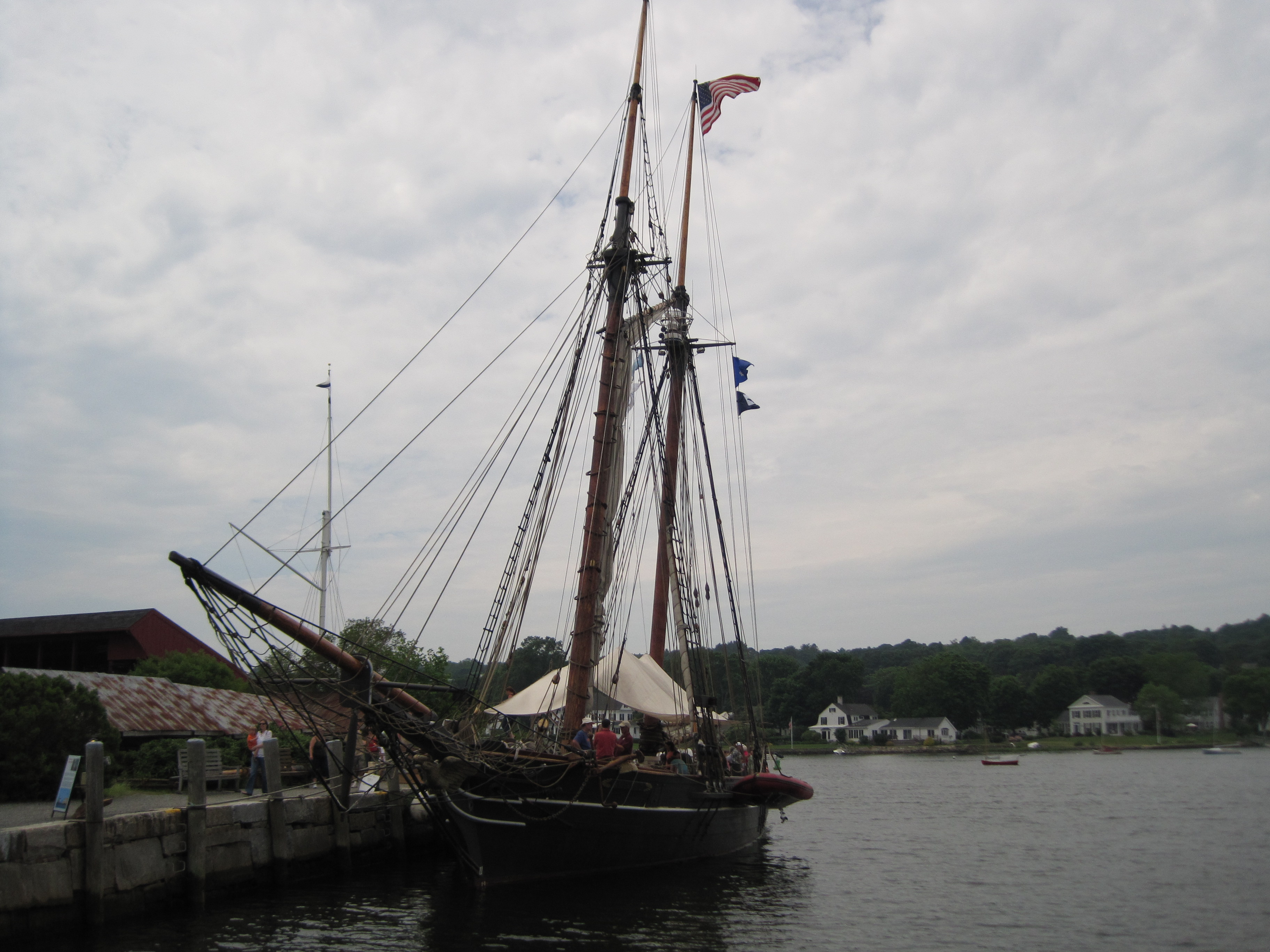
- Freedom Schooner Amistad at Mystic Seaport in 2010

United States
- Owner: 2000–2015: Amistad America, Inc., New Haven, Connecticut; from 2015: Discovering Amistad, Inc., New Haven, Connecticut
- Builder: Mystic Seaport
- Laid down: 1998
- Launched: March 25, 2000

General characteristics
- Tons burthen: 136 L. tons
- Length: 80.7 ft (24.6 m)
- Beam: 22.9 ft (7.0 m)
- Draft: 10.1 ft (3.1 m)
- Propulsion: Sail, 2 Caterpillar diesel engines
- Sail plan: Topsail schooner

Between 1998 and 2000, artisans at Mystic Seaport in Mystic, Connecticut built a replica of La Amistad using traditional tools and construction techniques common to wooden schooners built in the 19th century, but using modern materials and engines, officially named Amistad. It was promoted as "Freedom Schooner Amistad". The modern-day ship is not an exact replica of La Amistad, as it is slightly longer and has higher freeboard. There were no old blueprints of the original.

The new schooner was built using a general knowledge of the Baltimore Clippers and art drawings from the era. Some of the tools used in the project were the same as those that might have been used by a 19th-century shipwright, while others were powered. Tri-Coastal Marine, designers of "Freedom Schooner Amistad", used modern computer technology to develop plans for the vessel. Bronze bolts are used as fastenings throughout the ship. Freedom Schooner Amistad has two Caterpillar diesel engines and an external ballast keel made of lead. This technology was unavailable to 19th-century builders.

"Freedom Schooner Amistad" was operated by Amistad America, Inc. based in New Haven, Connecticut. The ship's mission was to educate the public on the history of slavery, abolition, discrimination, and civil rights. The homeport is New Haven, where the Amistad trial took place. It has also traveled to port cities for educational opportunities. It was also the State Flagship and Tall ship Ambassador of Connecticut. The ship made several commemorative voyages: one in 2007 to commemorate the 200th anniversary of the abolition of the Atlantic slave trade in Britain (1807) and the United States (1808), and one in 2010 to celebrate the 10th anniversary of its 2000 launching at Mystic Seaport. It undertook a two-year refit at Mystic Seaport starting in 2010 and was subsequently mainly used for sea training in Maine and for film work.

In 2013, Amistad America lost its non-profit organization status after failing to file tax returns for three years amid concern for accountability for public funding from the state of Connecticut. The company was later put into liquidation, and the non-profit Discovering Amistad Inc. purchased the ship from the receiver in November 2015. Amistad then returned to educational and promotional activity in New Haven, Connecticut.

== In popular culture ==
- On September 2, 1839, a play entitled The Long, Low Black Schooner, based on the revolt, opened in New York City and played to full houses. (La Amistad was painted black at the time of the revolt.)
- The slave revolt aboard La Amistad, the background of the slave trade, and its subsequent trial are retold in a poem by Robert Hayden entitled "Middle Passage", first published in 1962.
- In Robert Skimin's novel Gray Victory (1988), depicting an alternate history in which the South won the American Civil War, a group of abolitionist conspirators infiltrating Richmond, Virginia calls itself "Amistad".
- The film Amistad (1997), directed by Steven Spielberg, dramatizes the historical incidents. Major actors are Morgan Freeman, as a freed slave-turned-abolitionist in New Haven; Anthony Hopkins, as John Quincy Adams; Matthew McConaughey, as Roger Sherman Baldwin, an unorthodox, but influential lawyer; and Djimon Hounsou, as Cinque (Sengbe Peah).
- The opera Amistad (1997), composed by Anthony Davis with libretto by Thulani Davis, was commissioned and premiered by Lyric Opera of Chicago in 1997. The opera underwent a major revision and was then presented at the Spoleto Festival USA in 2008.
- The 1999 hit single "My Love Is Your Love", performed by Whitney Houston, references the "chains of Amistad".
- In January 2011, Random House published Ardency, a collection of poems written over 20 years by American poet Kevin Young which "gathers here a chorus of voices that tells the story of the Africans who mutinied on board the slave ship Amistad".

== See also ==
- African Slave Trade Patrol
- Bibliography of early American naval history
- Blockade of Africa
- Creole case
- John Quincy Adams and abolitionism
- List of historical schooners
- List of ships captured in the 19th century
- Sarah Margru Kinson
