= Josiah Willard Gibbs Sr. =

American linguist and theologian (1790–1861)

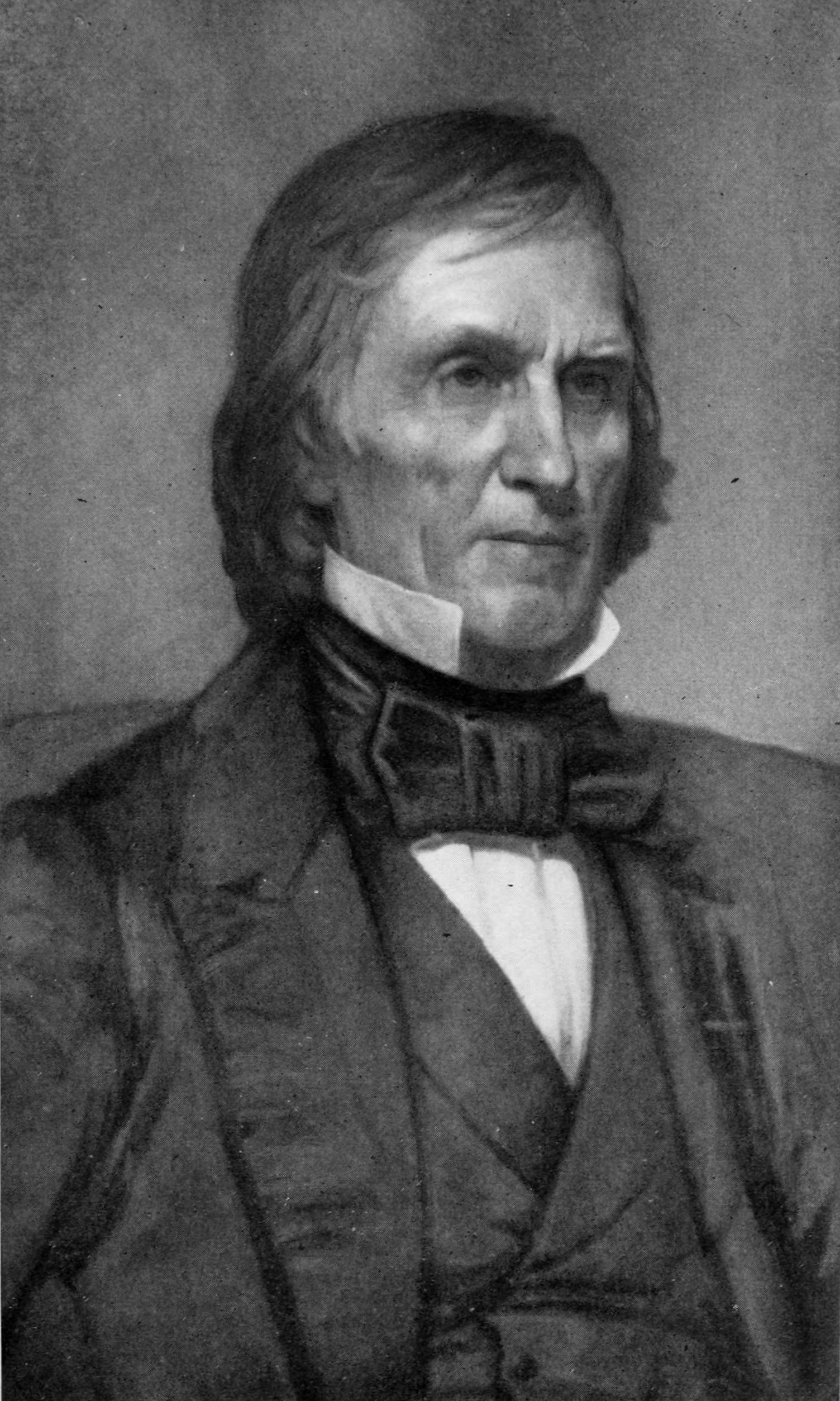
- Prof. Josiah Willard Gibbs Sr., from a portrait by F. B. Carpenter.
- Born: April 30, 1790; Salem, Massachusetts
- Died: March 25, 1861 (aged 70); New Haven, Connecticut
- Education: Yale College
- Occupations: Theologian, linguist, librarian

Josiah Willard Gibbs Sr. (30 April 1790 – 25 March 1861) was an American linguist and theologian, who served as professor of sacred literature at Yale University. He is remembered mainly for his involvement with the Amistad case and as the father of theoretical physicist Josiah Willard Gibbs.

== Early life and education ==
Josiah Gibbs was born in Salem, Massachusetts, into an old New England family with a scholarly tradition. His parents were Henry and Mercy (Prescott) Gibbs. Mercy was the sister of Rebecca Minot Prescott, wife of US Founding Father Roger Sherman. One of Josiah's ancestors, Samuel Willard, had served as acting President of Harvard College from 1701 to 1707.

Josiah Gibbs graduated from Yale College in 1809 and was a tutor there from 1811 to 1815. He then relocated to Andover, Massachusetts, where he pursued private studies in Hebrew and the Bible guided by Moses Stuart. Gibbs returned to Yale in 1824 as lecturer in the Theological Institution of Yale College. He was eventually promoted to a professorship at Yale Divinity School's department of sacred literature, a job that he continued to occupy until his death.

== Academic career ==
Gibbs was an ordained minister of the Congregational church and a licensed preacher, though he rarely performed religious ceremonies. His work increasingly emphasized linguistics and was influenced strongly by the grammar of James Harris and by German scholars such as Wilhelm Gesenius and Karl Becker. He attempted twice to translate into English a new lexicon of Hebrew published in Germany, only to discover that another scholar had completed the task while he was still working at it. These experiences motivated him to learn other languages.

Gibbs's most important work, Philological Studies, appeared in 1857. He collaborated with James Gates Percival on a revision of Noah Webster's dictionary, and he compiled vocabularies of the Hebrew, Greek, and Arabic languages, as well as several American Indian languages. He also served as the librarian of Yale College from 1824 until 1843. He was elected a member of the American Antiquarian Society in 1826.

== Involvement in the Amistad case ==
Gibbs was an active abolitionist and he played an important role in the Amistad trials of 1839–40. By visiting the African passengers in jail and showing them piles of pennies, he was able to learn to count to ten in the language spoken by most of them, which was determined to be Mende. Gibbs then strolled around the harbors in New Haven and New York City, counting aloud from one to ten in the words he had learned from the Africans. In this way he eventually met two British sailors, James Covey (a former slave) and Charles Pratt, who recognized the words and could serve as interpreters. The sailors also taught some Mende to Gibbs and to fellow Yale professor George E. Day, enabling them to converse with at least 20 of the captives.

Gibbs and Day testified as expert witnesses during the trial, establishing that the claim by the owners of the Amistad ship that the black passengers were slaves born in Cuba was false. Covey served as an interpreter for the Africans, allowing them to tell their story in court and to defend themselves from the charges of mutiny and murder. Gibbs later compiled and published vocabularies on Mende and other West African languages.

== Personal life ==
Gibbs married Mary Anna Van Cleve in September 1830 and was the father of four daughters, and one son, scientist Josiah Willard Gibbs, Jr. Both father and son died in New Haven and are buried in Grove Street Cemetery there. Although their official given names were the same, the father was generally known as Josiah Gibbs and the son as Willard Gibbs.

Josiah Gibbs's son-in-law, Addison Van Name, served as the librarian of Yale University from 1865 until 1904.

== In popular culture ==
Gibbs was portrayed by Austin Pendleton in the 1997 movie Amistad, directed by Steven Spielberg.
