= Slave fort =

Fort used during the Atlantic slave trade

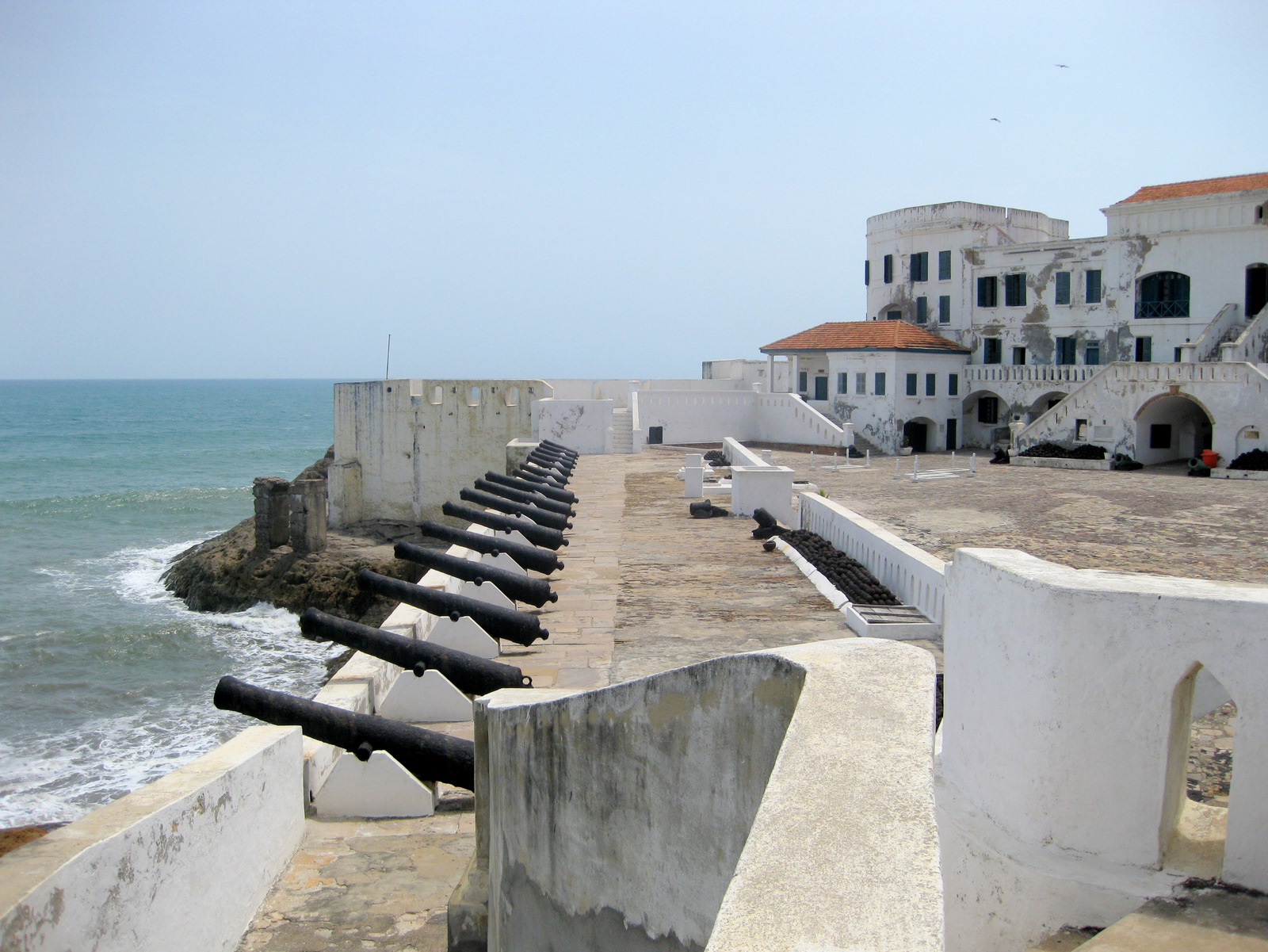
Cape Coast Castle, Ghana, June 2011

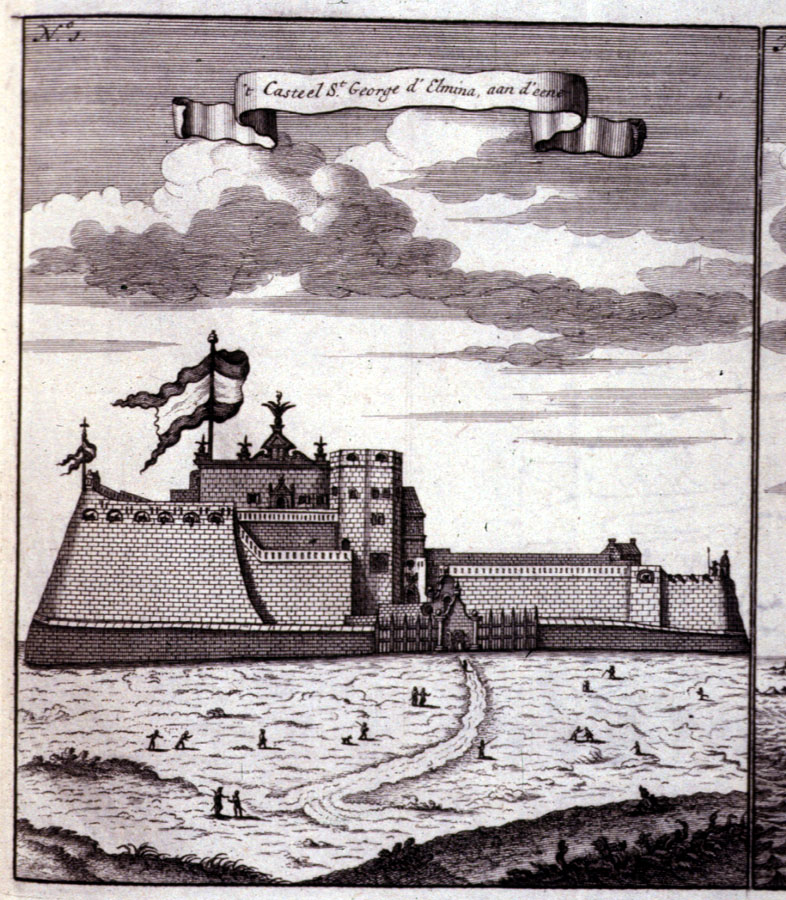
Elmina Castle, 1704

A slave fort or slave castle was a fortification designed to provide a defensible area in which enslaved victims would be kept until ships were ready to embark them and forcibly migrate them during the Atlantic slave trade. A slave fort was a militarized factory (trading post) which evolved at locations where the slave trade played a significant economic role on the coast of Africa. These forts were built by the state or chartered companies from nine European countries.

== Portuguese origins ==
In 1441 Henry the Navigator initiated the Portuguese exploration of the African coast. With a newly designed ship, the caravel, Portuguese explorers were able to sail further south. Their exploration was accompanied by repeated kidnappings of particularly Berbers who were enslaved and sold at newly created slave markets in Lisbon. Nuno Tristão and Gonçalo de Sintra explored as far south as the Bay of Arguin, where the Portuguese established a trading post on the island of Arguin. Henry ordered the first feitoria or factory to be built there in 1448, although there are also records that King Afonso V also ordered a fort to be built in 1462.

Elmina Castle was built in 1482 in present-day Elmina, Ghana (formerly the Gold Coast). It was the first of many slave forts built by Europeans along the coast of West Africa. João II decided to build the fort shortly after coming to the Portuguese throne. He appointed Diogo de Azambuja to fulfill the task, and supplied him with a pre-fabricated fort in kit form, along with 600 men. This enabled the fort to be built as the first European prefabricated building in sub-saharan Africa. This proved useful as the indigenous people did not want the Portuguese to build the fort despite Azambuja's initial success in some negotiations.
