= List of elections in 1844 =

Elections in 1844

The following elections occurred in the year 1844.

== North America ==
=== Central America ===
- 1844 Costa Rican Head of State election
- 1844 Salvadoran presidential election

=== United States ===
- 1844 New York state election
- 1844 United States elections

==== United States Presidential ====
- 1844 United States presidential election

==== United States Senate ====
- 1844 and 1845 United States Senate elections

==== United States House of Representatives ====
- 1844 United States House of Representatives elections

==== United States lieutenant gubernatorial ====
- 1844 Connecticut lieutenant gubernatorial election
- 1844 Missouri lieutenant gubernatorial election

==== United States gubernatorial ====
- 1844 Arkansas gubernatorial election
- 1844 Connecticut gubernatorial election
- 1844 Delaware gubernatorial election
- 1844 Kentucky gubernatorial election
- 1844 Maine gubernatorial election
- 1844 Maryland gubernatorial election
- 1844 Massachusetts gubernatorial election
- 1844 Missouri gubernatorial election
- 1844 New Hampshire gubernatorial election
- 1844 New Jersey gubernatorial election
- 1844 New York gubernatorial election
- 1844 North Carolina gubernatorial election
- 1844 Ohio gubernatorial election
- 1844 Pennsylvania gubernatorial election
- 1844 Rhode Island gubernatorial election
- 1844 South Carolina gubernatorial election
- 1844 Vermont gubernatorial election

==== United States mayoral elections ====
- 1844–45 Boston mayoral election
- 1844 Chicago mayoral election
- 1844 New York City mayoral election
- 1844 Philadelphia mayoral election

== See also ==
- Category:1844 elections
