= List of elections in 1843 =

The following elections occurred in the year 1843.

== North America ==
=== United States ===
- 1843 New York state election

==== United States Senate ====
- 1842 and 1843 United States Senate elections
- 1843 United States Senate election in New York
- 1843 United States Senate election in Pennsylvania
- 1843 United States Senate special elections in Tennessee

==== United States House of Representatives ====
- 1842 and 1843 United States House of Representatives elections

==== United States lieutenant gubernatorial ====
- 1843 Connecticut lieutenant gubernatorial election

==== United States gubernatorial ====
- 1843 Alabama gubernatorial election
- 1843 Connecticut gubernatorial election
- 1843 Georgia gubernatorial election
- 1843 Indiana gubernatorial election
- 1843 Maine gubernatorial election
- 1843 Massachusetts gubernatorial election
- 1843 Michigan gubernatorial election
- 1843 Mississippi gubernatorial election
- 1843 New Hampshire gubernatorial election
- 1843 New Jersey gubernatorial election
- 1843 Rhode Island gubernatorial election
- 1843 Tennessee gubernatorial election
- 1843 Vermont gubernatorial election

==== United States mayoral elections ====
- 1843 Boston mayoral election
- 1843 Chicago mayoral election
- 1843 Philadelphia mayoral election

== Europe ==
=== Belgium ===
- 1843 Belgian general election

=== Greece ===
- 1843 Greek parliamentary election

=== Hungary ===
- 1843 Hungarian parliamentary election

== See also ==
- Category:1843 elections
