= Henry Ellsworth =

Henry Ellsworth may refer to:

- Henry Leavitt Ellsworth (1791–1858), Commissioner of the U.S. Patent Office
- Henry W. Ellsworth (1814–1864), American attorney, author, poet and diplomat
