= 1845 Connecticut lieutenant gubernatorial election =

- April 2, 1845

Nominee	Reuben Booth	Noyes Billings
Party	Whig	Democratic
Popular vote	29,574	26,296
Percentage	51.00%	45.30%
Lieutenant Governor before election
Reuben Booth
Whig
Elected Lieutenant Governor
Reuben Booth
Whig

The 1845 Connecticut lieutenant gubernatorial election was held on April 2, 1845, to elect the lieutenant governor of Connecticut. Incumbent Whig lieutenant governor Reuben Booth won re-election against Democratic nominee and incumbent member of the Connecticut Senate Noyes Billings.

== General election ==
On election day, April 2, 1845, incumbent Whig lieutenant governor Reuben Booth won re-election with 51.00% of the vote, thereby retaining Whig control over the office of lieutenant governor. Booth was sworn in for his second term on May 7, 1845.

=== Results ===
Connecticut lieutenant gubernatorial election, 1845
Party	Candidate	Votes	%
Whig	Reuben Booth (incumbent)	29,574	51.00
Democratic	Noyes Billings	26,296	45.30
	Scattering	2,159	3.70
Total votes		58,029	100.00
Whig hold			
