= 1844 Connecticut lieutenant gubernatorial election =

- April 3, 1844

Nominee	Reuben Booth	William S. Holabird
Party	Whig	Democratic
Popular vote	30,101	28,530
Percentage	49.50%	46.90%
Lieutenant Governor before election
William S. Holabird
Democratic
Elected Lieutenant Governor
Reuben Booth
Whig

The 1844 Connecticut lieutenant gubernatorial election was held on April 3, 1844, to elect the lieutenant governor of Connecticut. Whig nominee and former member of the Connecticut Senate Reuben Booth received a plurality of the votes against incumbent Democratic lieutenant governor William S. Holabird in a rematch of the previous election. However, since no candidate received a majority in the popular vote, Reuben Booth was elected by the Connecticut General Assembly per the Connecticut Charter of 1662.

== General election ==
On election day, April 3, 1844, Whig nominee Reuben Booth won a plurality of the vote by a margin of 1,571 votes against his foremost opponent incumbent Democratic lieutenant governor William S. Holabird. However, as no candidate received a majority of the vote, the election was forwarded to the Connecticut General Assembly, who elected Reuben Booth, thereby gaining Whig control over the office of lieutenant governor. Booth was sworn in as the 38th lieutenant governor of Connecticut on May 1, 1844.

=== Results ===
Connecticut lieutenant gubernatorial election, 1844
Party	Candidate	Votes	%
Whig	Reuben Booth	30,101	49.50
Democratic	William S. Holabird (incumbent)	28,530	46.90
	Scattering	2,216	3.60
Total votes		60,847	100.00
Whig gain from Democratic			
