= 1846 Connecticut lieutenant gubernatorial election =

- April 1, 1846

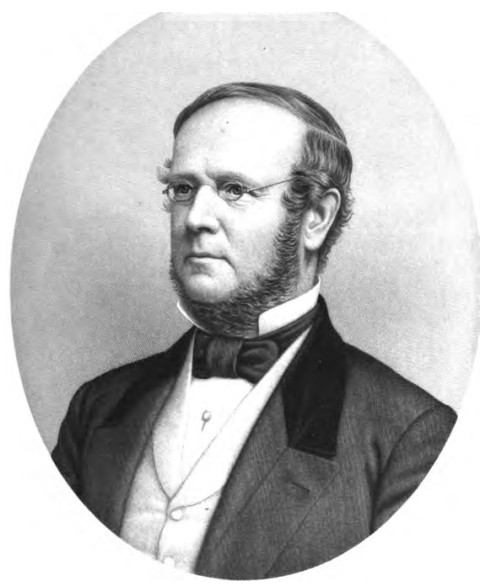
Nominee	Noyes Billings	Charles J. McCurdy
Party	Democratic	Whig
Popular vote	26,633	26,181
Percentage	48.50%	47.70%
Lieutenant Governor before election
Reuben Booth
Whig
Elected Lieutenant Governor
Noyes Billings
Democratic

The 1846 Connecticut lieutenant gubernatorial election was held on April 1, 1846, to elect the lieutenant governor of Connecticut. Democratic nominee and former member of the Connecticut Senate Noyes Billings received a plurality of the votes against Whig nominee and former Speaker of the Connecticut House of Representatives Charles J. McCurdy. However, since no candidate received a majority in the popular vote, Noyes Billings was elected by the Connecticut General Assembly per the Connecticut Charter of 1662.

== General election ==
On election day, April 1, 1846, Democratic nominee Noyes Billings won a plurality of the vote by a margin of 452 votes against his foremost opponent Whig nominee Charles J. McCurdy. However, as no candidate received a majority of the vote, the election was forwarded to the Connecticut General Assembly, who elected Noyes Billings, thereby gaining Democratic control over the office of lieutenant governor. Billings was sworn in as the 39th lieutenant governor of Connecticut on May 6, 1846.

=== Results ===
Connecticut lieutenant gubernatorial election, 1846
Party	Candidate	Votes	%
Democratic	Noyes Billings	26,633	48.50
Whig	Charles J. McCurdy	26,181	47.70
	Scattering	2,077	3.80
Total votes		54,891	100.00
Democratic gain from Whig			
