= 1843 Connecticut lieutenant gubernatorial election =

- April 5, 1843

Nominee	William S. Holabird	Reuben Booth
Party	Democratic	Whig
Popular vote	27,309	25,567
Percentage	49.80%	46.70%
Lieutenant Governor before election
William S. Holabird
Democratic
Elected Lieutenant Governor
William S. Holabird
Democratic

The 1843 Connecticut lieutenant gubernatorial election was held on April 5, 1843, to elect the lieutenant governor of Connecticut. Incumbent Democratic lieutenant governor William S. Holabird received a plurality of the votes against Whig nominee and former member of the Connecticut Senate Reuben Booth in a rematch of the previous election. However, since no candidate received a majority in the popular vote, William S. Holabird was elected by the Connecticut General Assembly per the Connecticut Charter of 1662.

== General election ==
On election day, April 5, 1843, incumbent Democratic lieutenant governor William S. Holabird won a plurality of the vote by a margin of 1,742 votes against his foremost opponent Whig nominee Reuben Booth. However, as no candidate received a majority of the vote, the election was forwarded to the Connecticut General Assembly, who elected William S. Holabird, thereby retaining Democratic control over the office of lieutenant governor. Holabird was sworn in for his second term on May 3, 1843.

=== Results ===
Connecticut lieutenant gubernatorial election, 1843
Party	Candidate	Votes	%
Democratic	William S. Holabird (incumbent)	27,309	49.80
Whig	Reuben Booth	25,567	46.70
	Scattering	1,920	3.50
Total votes		54,796	100.00
Democratic hold			
