= Governor Cleveland =

Governor Cleveland may refer to:

- Chauncey Fitch Cleveland (1799–1887), 31st Governor of Connecticut
- Grover Cleveland (1837–1908), 28th Governor of New York
