= William W. Ellsworth =

American judge

William Wolcott Ellsworth
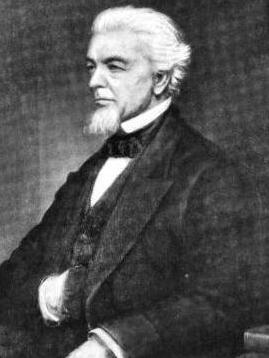

30th Governor of Connecticut
- In office May 2, 1838 – May 4, 1842
- Lieutenant: Charles Hawley
- Preceded by: Henry W. Edwards
- Succeeded by: Chauncey Fitch Cleveland

Member of the U.S. House of Representatives from Connecticut's at-large district
- In office March 4, 1829 – July 8, 1834
- Preceded by: David Plant
- Succeeded by: Joseph Trumbull

Personal details
- Born: November 10, 1791 Windsor, Connecticut
- Died: January 15, 1868 (aged 76) Hartford, Connecticut
- Party: Whig; Republican
- Spouse: Emily S. Webster
- Relations: Oliver Ellsworth (father); Henry Leavitt Ellsworth (brother); Noah Webster (father-in-law); Henry W. Ellsworth (nephew)
- Children: 6
- Education: Yale College, Litchfield Law School
- Profession: Lawyer, politician, judge

William Wolcott Ellsworth (November 10, 1791 – January 15, 1868) was a Yale-educated attorney who served as the 30th governor of Connecticut, a three-term United States Congressman, a justice of the State Supreme Court.

== Biography ==
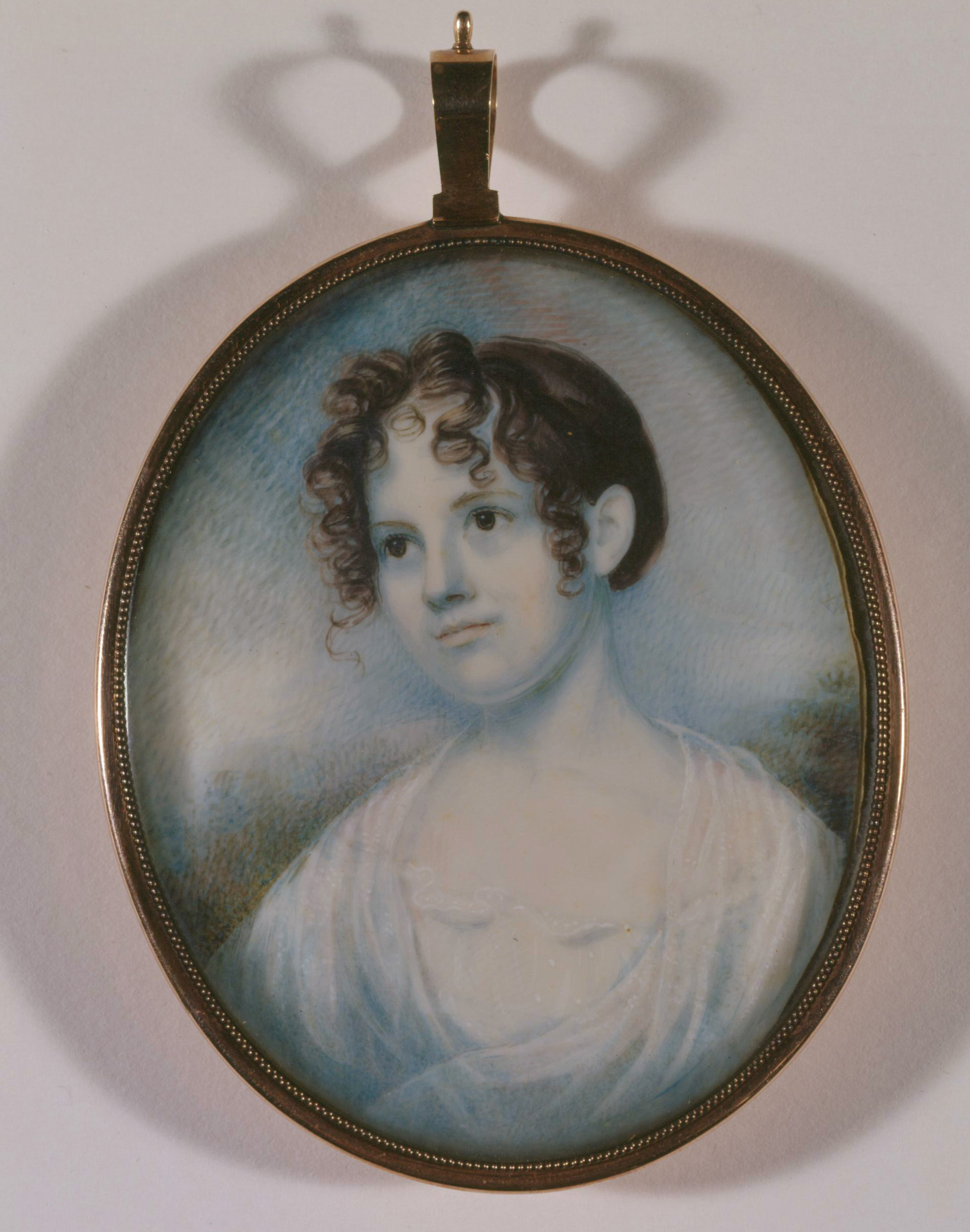
Emily Webster

Born in Windsor on November 10, 1791, Ellsworth was the son of Founding Father Oliver Ellsworth, and son-in-law of Noah Webster, who named Ellsworth executor of his will. His twin brother was Henry Leavitt Ellsworth, first Commissioner of the United States Patent Office. He completed preparatory studies, and graduated from Yale College in 1810. He studied law at Tapping Reeve's Litchfield Law School in Litchfield, was afterwards admitted to the bar in 1811.

Among Ellsworth's Yale classmates was Samuel F. B. Morse, whose idea of the telegraph would later be championed by Ellsworth's twin brother Henry Leavitt Ellsworth during his term as the first Commissioner of the U.S. Patent Office.

On September 14, 1813, he was married to Emily S. Webster, eldest daughter of Rebecca Greenleaf and Noah Webster Jr., publisher of dictionaries. Noah Webster named Ellsworth as one of the executors of his will of 1843.

== Career ==
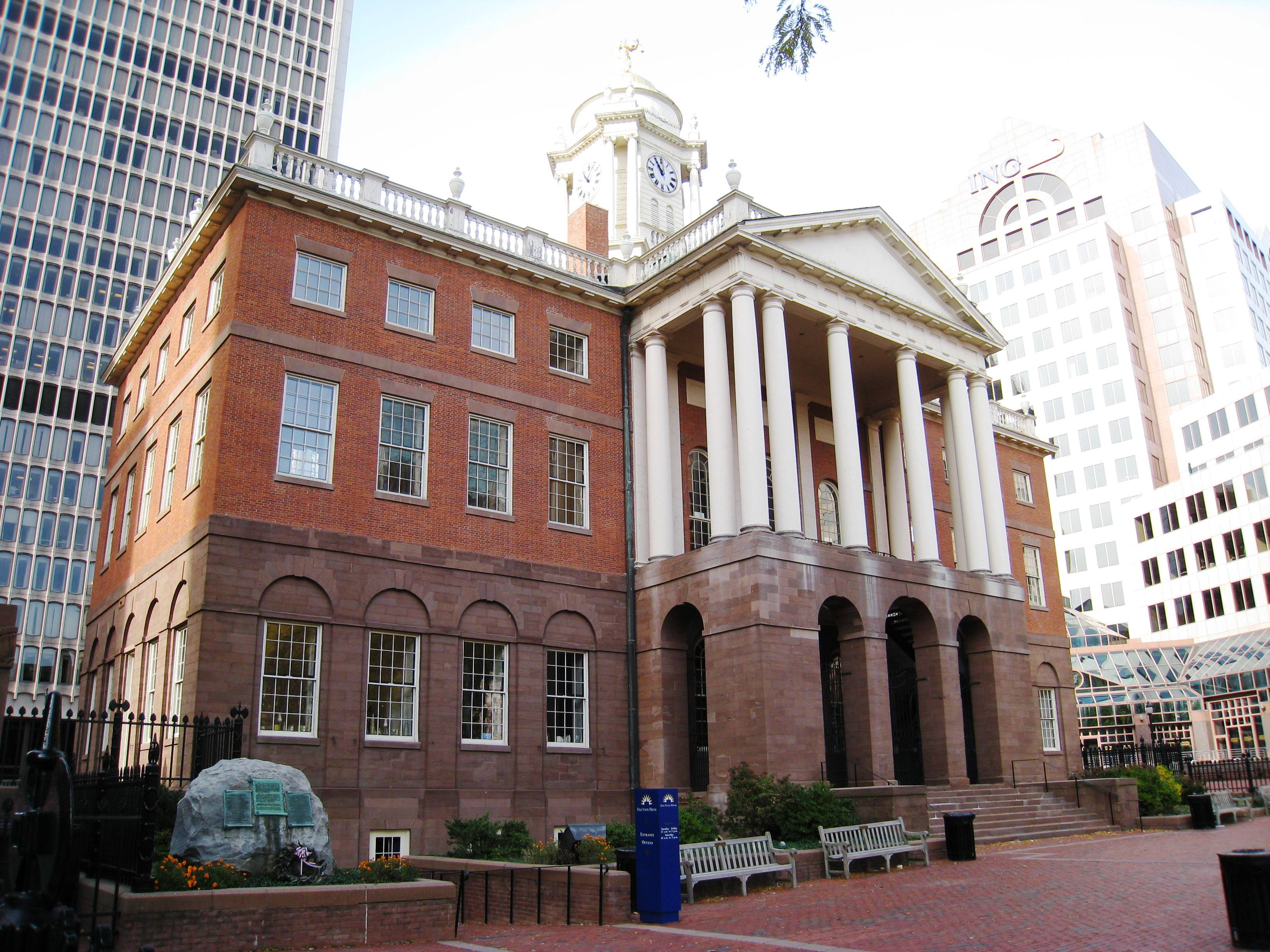
Old State House, Hartford, where William Wolcott Ellsworth served as governor

Ellsworth was appointed professor of law at Trinity College in 1827, which position he held until his death. His law partner starting in 1817 was his brother-in-law Chief Justice of the Connecticut Supreme Court Thomas Scott Williams, who was elected to the U.S. Congress that year and sought a younger partner to manage his practice in his absence. (Judge Williams was married to Ellsworth's sister.) Aged 26, Ellsworth took up the reins of Congressman Williams' law practice, the largest in the state.

As an Anti-Jacksonian Ellsworth was elected to the Twenty-first, Twenty-second, and Twenty-third United States Congresses and served from March 4, 1829, to July 8, 1834, when he resigned.

From 1836 to 1837, Ellsworth served a one-year term in the Connecticut State Senate representing the 1st District, which included Hartford and the surrounding area.

Ellsworth was elected governor of Connecticut 1838–1842. During his tenure, a progressive method for voter registration was constituted and a school commission was founded.

In 1847, Elsworth became judge of the Connecticut Supreme Court and served from 1847 to 1861, when, by the constitutional provision relative to age, he retired. He twice declined to accept the nomination to the United States Senate, and retired from public life.

== Death ==
Ellsworth died in Hartford on January 15, 1868. The former Congressman and Governor is interred at the Old North Cemetery in Hartford.

The lawyer and orator Rufus Choate said of Ellsworth before the Massachusetts General Assembly: "If the land of Shermans, Griswolds, Daggets and Williams, rich as she is in learning and virtue, has a sounder lawyer, a more upright magistrate, or an honester man in her public service, I know not his name."

== See also ==
- Oliver Ellsworth, Henry Leavitt Ellsworth

Party political offices
Preceded by Gideon Tomlinson	Whig nominee for Governor of Connecticut; 1837, 1838, 1839, 1840, 1841, 1842	Succeeded by Roger Sherman Baldwin
Political offices
Preceded by Henry W. Edwards	Governor of Connecticut; 1838—1842	Succeeded by Chauncey Fitch Cleveland
U.S. House of Representatives
Preceded by David Plant	Member of the U.S. House of Representatives from Connecticut's at-large congressional district 1829–1834	Succeeded by Joseph Trumbull
