= 1842 Connecticut lieutenant gubernatorial election =

- April 6, 1842

Nominee	William S. Holabird	Reuben Booth
Party	Democratic	Whig
Popular vote	25,491	23,690
Percentage	49.80%	46.30%
Lieutenant Governor before election
Charles Hawley
Whig
Elected Lieutenant Governor
William S. Holabird
Democratic

The 1842 Connecticut lieutenant gubernatorial election was held on April 6, 1842, to elect the lieutenant governor of Connecticut. Democratic nominee and former United States Attorney for the District of Connecticut William S. Holabird received a plurality of the votes against Whig nominee and former member of the Connecticut Senate Reuben Booth. However, since no candidate received a majority in the popular vote, William S. Holabird was elected by the Connecticut General Assembly per the Connecticut Charter of 1662.

== General election ==
On election day, April 6, 1842, Democratic nominee William S. Holabird won a plurality of the vote by a margin of 1,801 votes against his foremost opponent Whig nominee Reuben Booth. However, as no candidate received a majority of the vote, the election was forwarded to the Connecticut General Assembly, who elected William S. Holabird, thereby gaining Democratic control over the office of lieutenant governor. Holabird was sworn in as the 37th lieutenant governor of Connecticut on May 4, 1842.

=== Results ===
Connecticut lieutenant gubernatorial election, 1842
Party	Candidate	Votes	%
Democratic	William S. Holabird	25,491	49.80
Whig	Reuben Booth	23,690	46.30
	Scattering	1,999	3.90
Total votes		51,180	100.00
Democratic gain from Whig			
