= 1842 United States elections =

- ← 1840 1841 1842 1843 1844 → Midterm elections
- Incumbent president: John Tyler (Independent)
- Next Congress: 28th

Senate elections
- Overall control: Whig hold
- Seats contested: 17 of 52 seats
- Net seat change: Democratic +3

House elections
- Overall control: Democratic gain
- Seats contested: All 223 voting seats
- Net seat change: Democratic +49

Elections occurred in the middle of President John Tyler's term, during the Second Party System. Tyler had become president on April 4, 1841, upon the death of his predecessor, William Henry Harrison. Elected as vice president on the Whig ticket with Harrison in 1840, Tyler was expelled from the party in September 1841. Members of the 28th United States Congress were chosen in this election. Florida joined the union during the 28th Congress. Whigs kept control of the Senate, but lost control of the House.

Following the 1840 census, the size of the House was reduced by 19 seats. Democrats won massive gains, turning a commanding Whig majority into a dominant Democratic majority.

In the Senate, Democrats picked up one seat, but Whigs retained the majority.

== See also ==
- 1842–43 United States House of Representatives elections
- 1842–43 United States Senate elections
