= Francis Gillette =

American politician (1807–1879)

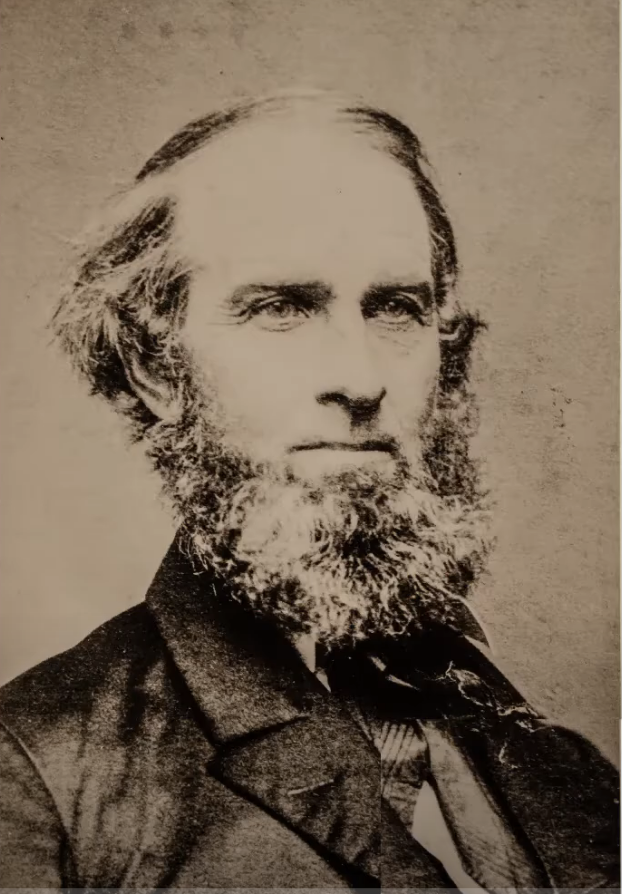

United States Senator from Connecticut
- In office May 24, 1854 – March 3, 1855
- Preceded by: Truman Smith
- Succeeded by: Lafayette S. Foster

Member of the Connecticut House of Representatives
- In office 1832; 1836; 1838

Personal details
- Born: December 14, 1807 Old Windsor, Connecticut, US
- Died: September 30, 1879 (aged 71) Hartford, Connecticut, US
- Party: Liberty (1842–1848); Free Soil (1852–1855); Republican
- Spouse: Elisabeth Daggett Hooker Gillette
- Education: Yale College
- Profession: Politician, lecturer

Francis Gillette (December 14, 1807 – September 30, 1879) was a politician from Connecticut, US. He was the father of actor and playwright William Gillette and politician and editor Edward H. Gillette.

Gillette was born in Old Windsor, Connecticut (today part of the town of Bloomfield), Gillette moved with his parents, Rev. Ashbel and Achsah Francis, to Ashfield, Massachusetts as a child. He graduated from Yale College in 1829 and commenced the study of law, but his health becoming impaired, he instead engaged in agricultural pursuits in Bloomfield.

He was a member of the Connecticut House of Representatives in 1832, 1836 and 1838 and was an unsuccessful candidate for Governor of Connecticut in 1842, losing to Chauncey F. Cleveland, and nine times subsequently.

Gillette served as chairman of the Connecticut Board of Education from 1849 to 1865 and moved to Hartford, Connecticut in 1852 and later developed the neighborhood, "Nook Farm" with his brother-in-law, John Hooker.

He was elected a Free Soiler to the United States Senate in 1854 to fill a vacancy and served until the end of the term in 1855, not being a candidate for reelection. Afterwards, Gillette became a lecturer on agriculture and temperance and was a trustee of the Connecticut State Normal School, also serving as its president for many years.

He aided in the formation of the Republican Party in Connecticut and for several years was a silent partner in the Evening Press, the organ of the party.

He engaged in the real estate business in Hartford, Connecticut until his death there on September 30, 1879. He was interred in Riverside Cemetery in Farmington, Connecticut.

The Francis Gillette House in Bloomfield, Connecticut, his home in early years of his antislavery involvement, is listed on the U.S. National Register of Historic Places.

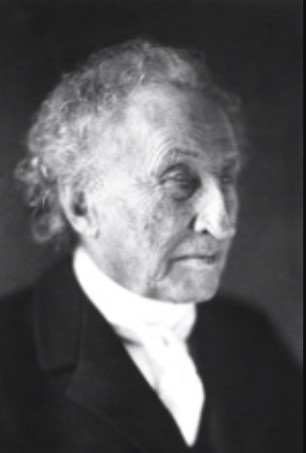
Francis Gillette in his later years

== Legacy ==
Gillette Ridge Golf Club is named after Francis Gillette.

Party political offices
| First | Liberty nominee for Governor of Connecticut; 1842, 1843, 1844, 1845, 1846, 1847, 1848 | Succeeded by None |
| Preceded by John Boyd | Free Soil nominee for Governor of Connecticut; 1852, 1853 | Succeeded by John Hooker |
U.S. Senate
| Preceded by Truman Smith | U.S. senator (Class 3) from Connecticut; May 24, 1854 – March 3, 1855; Served alongside: Isaac Toucey | Succeeded by Lafayette S. Foster |
