= 1846 Connecticut gubernatorial election =

- April 6, 1846
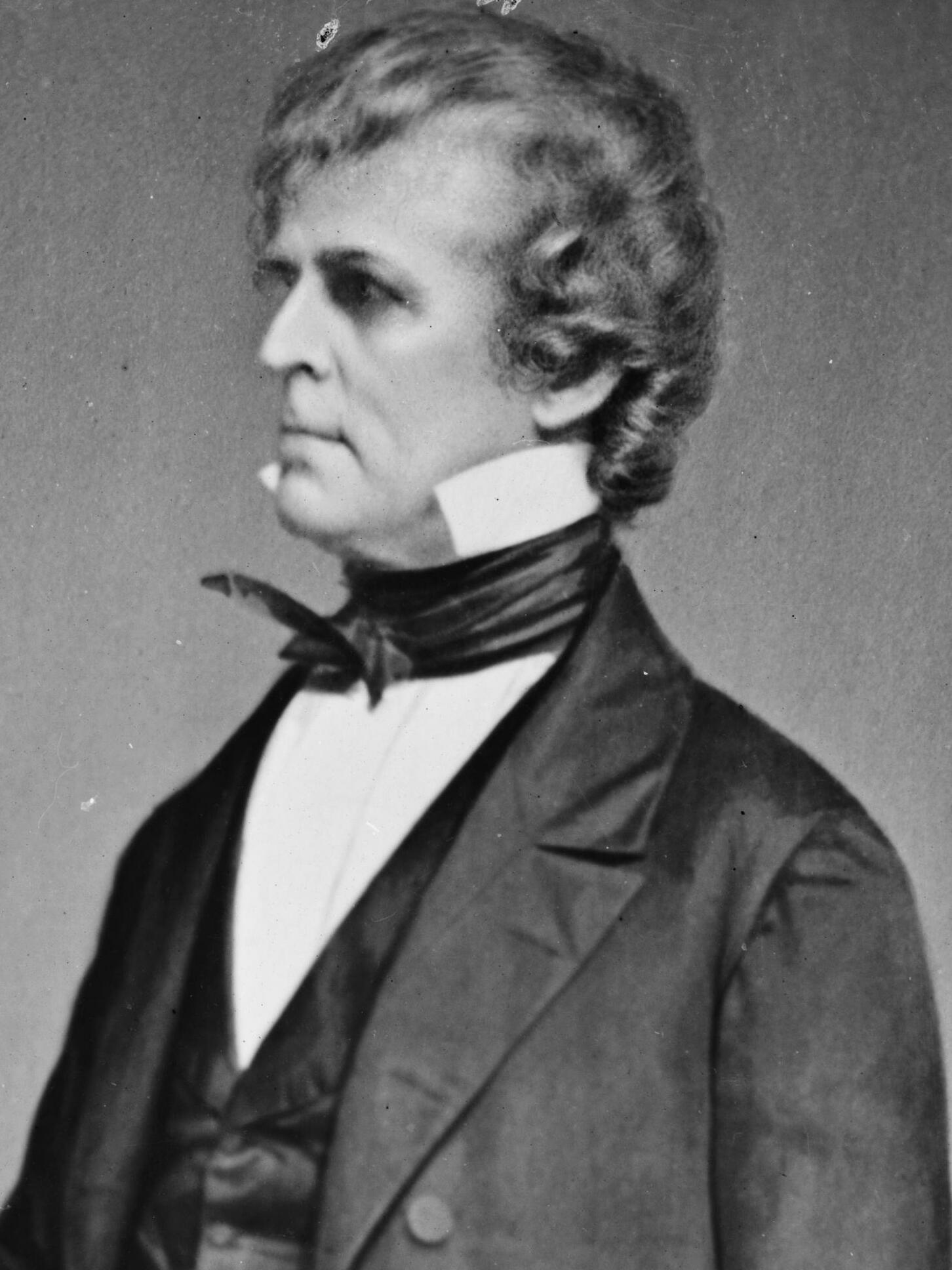

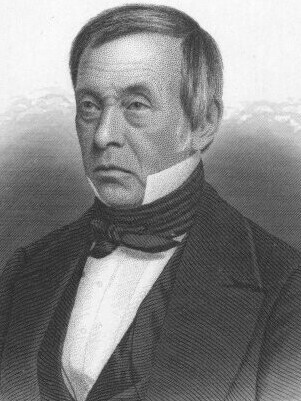
Nominee	Isaac Toucey	Clark Bissell
Party	Democratic	Whig
Electoral vote	124	117
Popular vote	27,203	27,822
Percentage	47.54%	48.62%
- Toucey: 40–50% 50–60% 60–70% Bissell: 40–50% 50–60% 60–70% 70–80%
Governor before election
Roger Sherman Baldwin
Whig
Elected Governor
Isaac Toucey
Democratic

The 1846 Connecticut gubernatorial election was held on April 6, 1846. Former congressman and Democratic nominee Isaac Toucey was elected, defeating former state legislator and Whig nominee Clark Bissell with 47.54% of the vote.

Although Bissell won a plurality of the vote, he did not win a majority. The state constitution at the time required that in such a case, the Connecticut General Assembly decides the election. The state legislature voted for Toucey, 124 to 117, and Toucey became the governor.

== General election ==
=== Candidates ===
Major party candidates

- Isaac Toucey, Democratic
- Clark Bissell, Whig

Minor party candidates

- Francis Gillette, Liberty

=== Results ===
1846 Connecticut gubernatorial election
Party	Candidate	Votes	%	±%
Whig	Clark Bissell	27,822	48.62%	
Democratic	Isaac Toucey	27,203	47.54%	
Liberty	Francis Gillette	2,201	3.85%	
Plurality		619		
Turnout				

1846 Connecticut gubernatorial election, contingent General Assembly election
Party	Candidate	Votes	%	±%
Democratic	Isaac Toucey	124	51.45%	
Whig	Clark Bissell	117	48.55%	
Majority		7		
Democratic gain from Whig		Swing		
