= Isaac Toucey =

American politician (1792–1869)

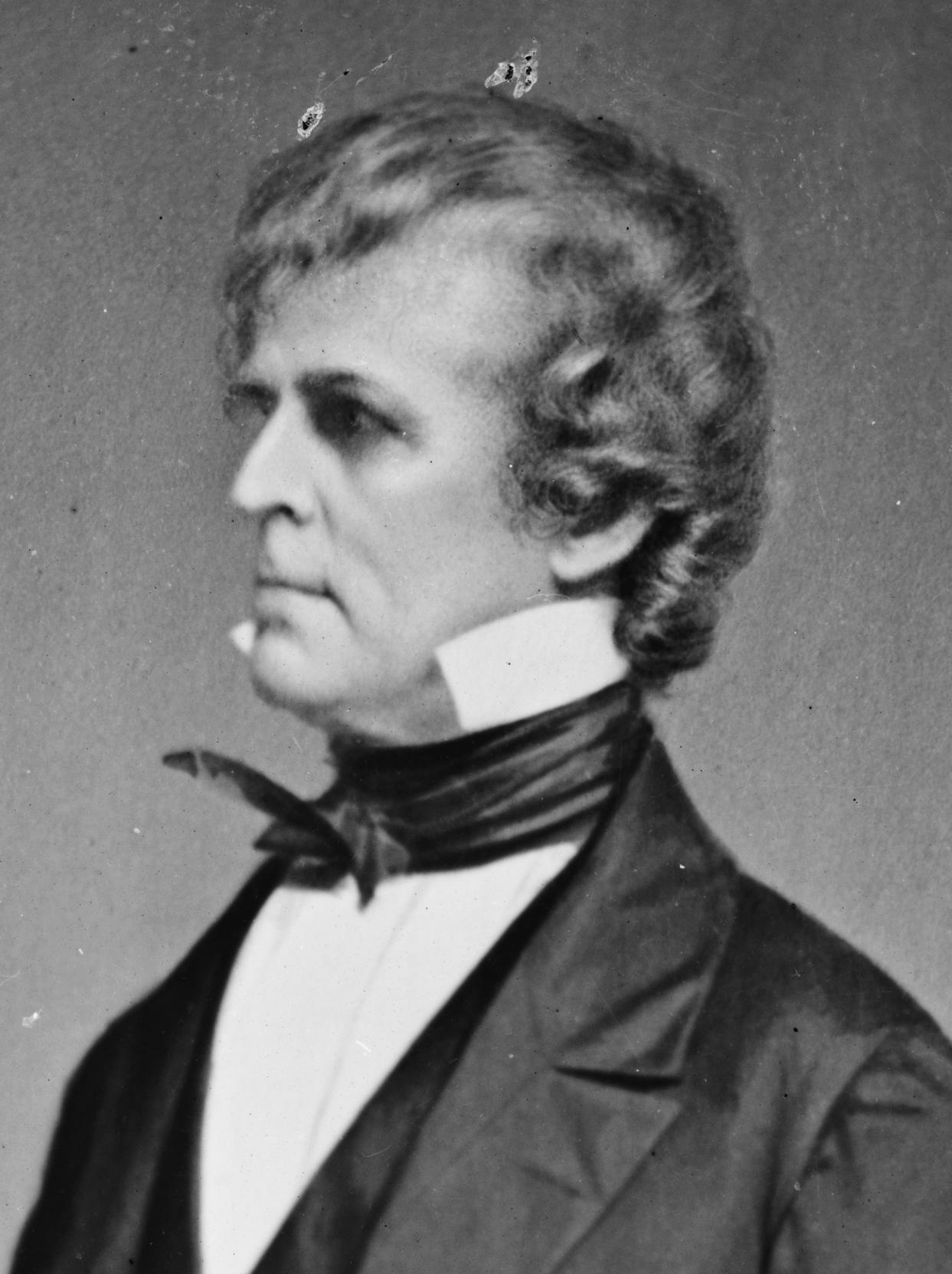
- Toucey c. 1855-1865

23rd United States Secretary of the Navy
- In office March 7, 1857 – March 4, 1861
- President: James Buchanan
- Preceded by: James C. Dobbin
- Succeeded by: Gideon Welles

United States Senator from Connecticut
- In office May 12, 1852 – March 3, 1857
- Preceded by: Roger Sherman Baldwin
- Succeeded by: James Dixon

Member of the Connecticut House of Representatives
- In office 1852

Member of the Connecticut Senate
- In office 1850–1852

20th United States Attorney General
- In office June 21, 1848 – March 3, 1849
- President: James K. Polk
- Preceded by: Nathan Clifford
- Succeeded by: Reverdy Johnson

33rd Governor of Connecticut
- In office May 6, 1846 – May 5, 1847
- Lieutenant: Noyes Billings
- Preceded by: Roger Sherman Baldwin
- Succeeded by: Clark Bissell

Member of the U.S. House of Representatives from Connecticut
- In office March 4, 1835 – March 3, 1839
- Preceded by: Noyes Barber
- Succeeded by: Joseph Trumbull
- Constituency: At-large district (1835–1837); 1st district (1837–1839)

Prosecuting Attorney of Hartford County
- In office 1842-1844
- In office 1822-1835

Personal details
- Born: November 15, 1792 Newtown, Connecticut, U.S.
- Died: July 30, 1869 (aged 76) Hartford, Connecticut, U.S.
- Party: Democratic
- Spouse: Catherine Nichols (m. 1827)
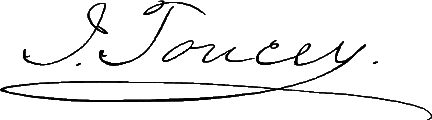
- Signature

Isaac Toucey (November 15, 1796 – July 30, 1869) was an American politician who served as a U.S. senator, U.S. secretary of the Navy, U.S. attorney general and the 33rd governor of Connecticut.

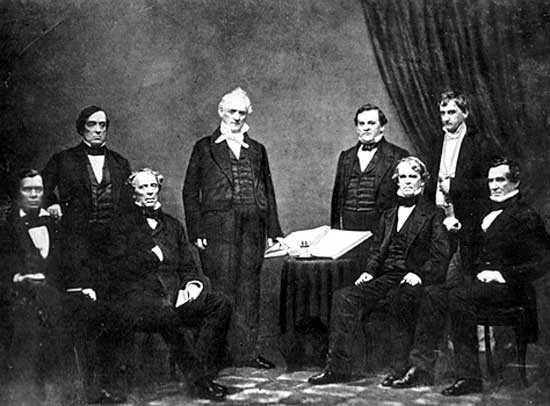
President Buchanan and his Cabinet From left to right: Jacob Thompson, Lewis Cass, John B. Floyd, James Buchanan, Howell Cobb, Isaac Toucey, Joseph Holt and Jeremiah S. Black, (c. 1859)

== Biography ==
Born in Newtown, Connecticut, Toucey pursued classical studies; studied law and was admitted to the bar at Hartford, Connecticut, in 1818. From 1825 to 1835 he had his own practice in Hartford, Connecticut. He married Catherine Nichols in Hartford on October 28, 1827. The couple had no children.

== Career ==
In 1822, Toucey was named prosecuting attorney of Hartford County, Connecticut. He served in that position until 1835, when he was elected to the 24th and 25th Congresses (at-large and then representing the 1st District). He served from 1835 to 1839. He lost the election of 1838 and returned to his position as prosecuting attorney in 1842.

In 1845, Toucey ran for Governor of Connecticut and lost, but the Connecticut State Legislature appointed him to the position following the election in 1846. During his tenure, an antibribery bill geared toward eliminating fraudulent electoral procedures was considered. He was defeated in an attempt at re-nomination in 1847.

In 1848, President James K. Polk appointed Toucey the 20th Attorney General of the United States, a position he held until 1849. He returned to Connecticut and took a place in the Connecticut Senate in 1850, and then in the Connecticut House of Representatives in 1852.

Toucey was elected to the U.S. Senate for the term commencing March 4, 1851, and served from May 12, 1852, to March 3, 1857, having that year declined to be a candidate for reelection. During that time, he often served as the legislative point man for Franklin Pierce and his administration.

James Buchanan, with whom Toucey had served in the Polk administration, appointed him U.S. Secretary of the Navy in his Cabinet in 1857 as a sop to the Pierce faction as well as to represent New England in the Cabinet. A moderate Northerner much in line with Buchanan's thought in the sectional controversies of the day, Toucey held that post until 1861 and the arrival of the Abraham Lincoln administration. During that time, Toucey would undergo criticism for alleged corruption as uncovered by the Covode Committee, resulting in him being censured by the House of Representatives in June 1860. Toucey was then replaced by one of his chief rivals in Connecticut, Gideon Welles. After 1861 he returned to his law practice.

== Death and legacy ==
Toucey died in Hartford on July 30, 1869. He is interred at Cedar Hill Cemetery in Hartford, Connecticut. USS Toucey (DD-282) was named for him.

U.S. House of Representatives
Preceded by Noyes Barber	Member of the U.S. House of Representatives from Connecticut's at-large congressional district 1835–1837	Constituency abolished
New constituency	Member of the U.S. House of Representatives from Connecticut's 1st congressional district 1837–1839	Succeeded by Joseph Trumbull
Party political offices
Preceded by Chauncey Fitch Cleveland	Democratic nominee for Governor of Connecticut; 1845, 1846	Succeeded by Isaac Whittlesey
Political offices
Preceded by Roger Sherman Baldwin	Governor of Connecticut; 1846–1847	Succeeded by Clark Bissell
Preceded by James C. Dobbin	United States Secretary of the Navy; 1857–1861	Succeeded by Gideon Welles
Legal offices
Preceded by Nathan Clifford	United States Attorney General; 1848–1849	Succeeded by Reverdy Johnson
U.S. Senate
Preceded by Roger Sherman Baldwin	U.S. Senator (Class 1) from Connecticut; 1852–1857; Served alongside: Truman Smith, Francis Gillette, Lafayette S. Foster	Succeeded by James Dixon
