= Ebenezer Baldwin =

American pastor (1745–1776)

Ebenezer Baldwin (July 3, 1745 – October 1, 1776) was a religious leader in Connecticut in the years before the American Revolution.

He was the eldest son of Captain Ebenezer Baldwin of Norwich, Connecticut, and grandson of Thomas and Abigail (Lay) Baldwin, from an area of Norwich which is now Bozrah. His mother was Bethiah, sister of Reverend Nehemiah Barker, under whom he studied to enter Yale College.

He was the brother of US Representative and Judge Simeon Baldwin, the uncle of Roger Sherman Baldwin and great-uncle of Simeon E. Baldwin.
