= 1842 Connecticut gubernatorial election =

- April 4, 1842
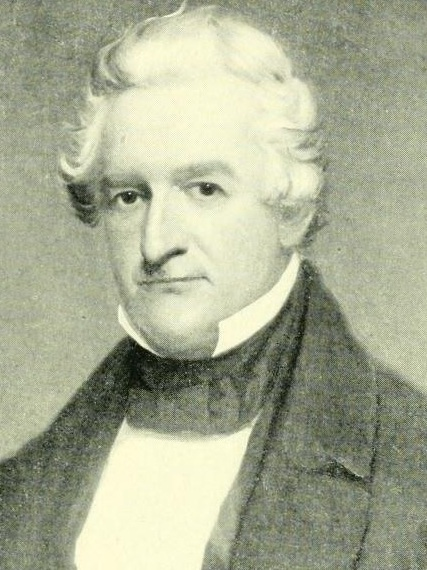

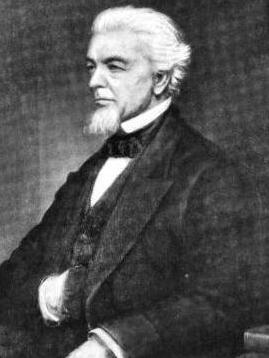
Nominee	Chauncey Fitch Cleveland	William W. Ellsworth
Party	Democratic	Whig
Electoral vote	139	68
Popular vote	25,564	23,790
Percentage	49.94%	46.29%
- Cleveland: 40–50% 50–60% 60–70% 70–80% Ellsworth: 40–50% 50–60% 60–70% 70–80% Tie
Governor before election
William W. Ellsworth
Whig
Elected Governor
Chauncey Fitch Cleveland
Democratic

The 1842 Connecticut gubernatorial election was held on April 4, 1842. Former Speaker of the Connecticut House of Representatives and Democratic nominee Chauncey Fitch Cleveland was elected, defeating incumbent governor and Whig nominee William W. Ellsworth with 49.94% of the vote.

Cleveland won a plurality of the vote, but fell just short of a majority, by 107 votes. The state constitution at the time required the Connecticut General Assembly decide the election if no candidate won a majority of the vote. The state legislature voted 139 to 68 to elect Cleveland the governor.

This was the first appearance of the Liberty Party in a Connecticut governor's race, and the first of Francis Gillette's ten attempts at seeking the governorship.

== General election ==
=== Candidates ===
Major party candidates

- Chauncey Fitch Cleveland, Democratic
- William W. Ellsworth, Whig

Minor party candidates

- Francis Gillette, Liberty

=== Results ===
1842 Connecticut gubernatorial election
Party	Candidate	Votes	%	±%
Democratic	Chauncey Fitch Cleveland	25,564	49.79%	
Whig	William W. Ellsworth (incumbent)	23,790	46.34%	
Liberty	Francis Gillette	1,319	2.57%	
Conservative	Luther Loomis	612	1.20%	
Plurality		1,774		
Turnout				

1842 Connecticut gubernatorial election, contingent General Assembly election
Party	Candidate	Votes	%	±%
Democratic	Chauncey Fitch Cleveland	139	67.15%	
Whig	William W. Ellsworth (incumbent)	68	32.85%	
Majority		71		
Democratic gain from Whig		Swing		
