= Gillette Ridge Golf Club =

American public golf course

Coordinates: 41.81468°N 72.74067°W

- Gillette Golf Course at Cigna business park

- Location within Connecticut Location within the United States

Club information
- Location: Bloomfield, Connecticut, U.S.
- Established: 2004; 22 years ago
- Type: Private
- Tota holes: 18
- Website: https://gilletteridgegolf.com
- Designed by: Arnold Palmer
- Par: 72
- Length: 7,191 yards (6,575 m)

Gillette Ridge Golf Club is a public golf course located in Bloomfield, Connecticut. Located on the Cigna headquarters campus (formerly known as Connecticut General Life Insurance), it is the only public Arnold Palmer designed course in the Northeast. Cigna Insurance currently owns the property and has Arnold Palmer Golf Management running the daily operations.

The club is named after Francis Gillette.

== History ==
On September 27, 1999, Cigna announced plans to develop land at its Bloomfield headquarters. This included a golf course, conference center, hotel, office buildings, and homes. The project was named Gillette Ridge in December 2001. The course opened to the public on July 30, 2004.

== Course ==
The course is noted for its difficulty, with a relatively large number of hazards.
