= Sidney Dean =

American politician (1818–1901)

The Reverend Sidney Dean
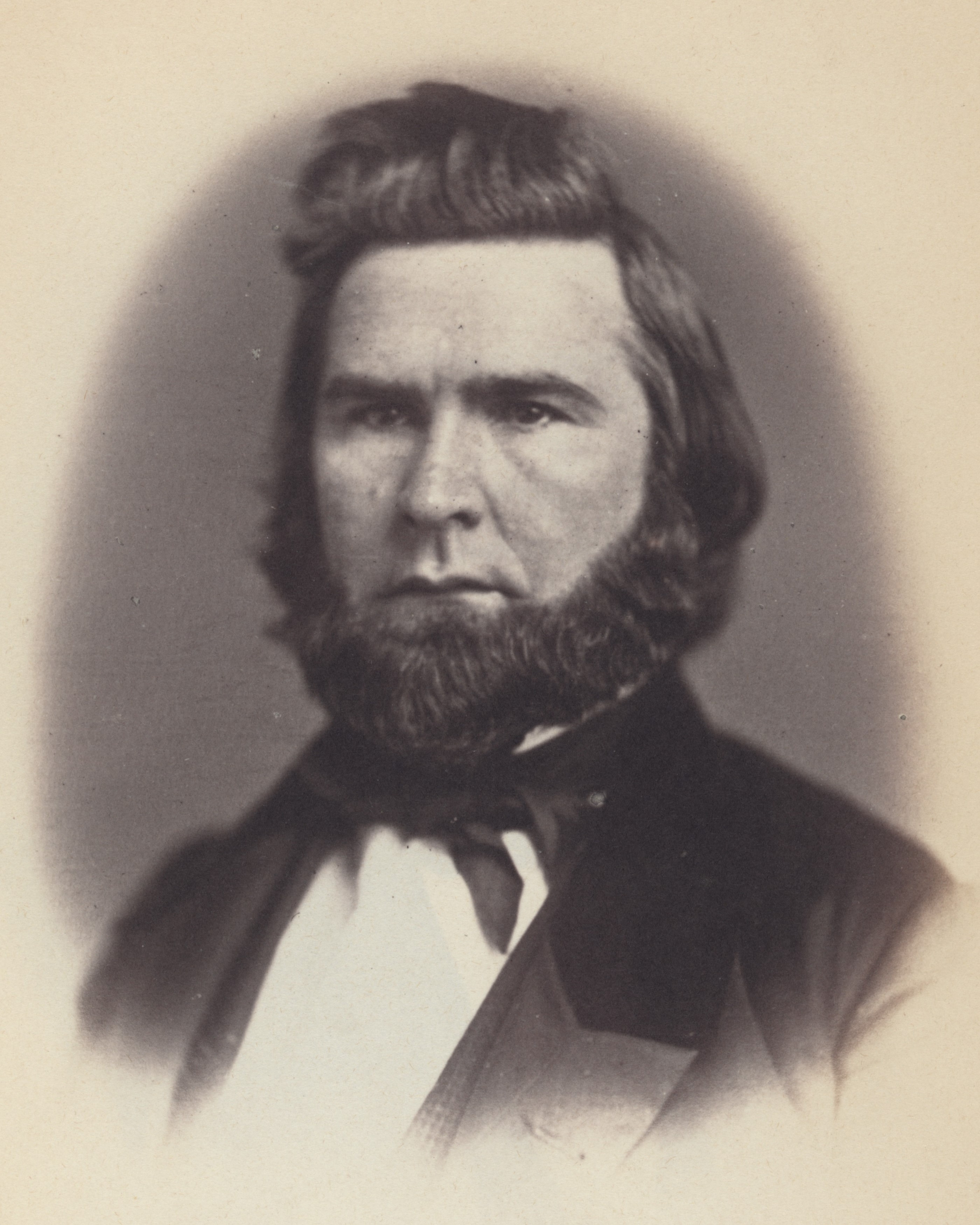
- Portrait by Julian Vannerson, 1859

Member of the Rhode Island Senate from Warren
- In office May 3, 1870 – May 7, 1872
- Preceded by: Wheaton Allen
- Succeeded by: Henry H. Luther

Member of the U.S. House of Representatives from Connecticut's 3rd district
- In office April 1855 – March 3, 1859
- Preceded by: Nathan Belcher
- Succeeded by: Alfred A. Burnham

Member of the Connecticut House of Representatives from Thompson
- In office May 3, 1854 – April 1855 Serving with Faxon Nichols
- Preceded by: Moses Chandler
- Succeeded by: Jesse Alton

Personal details
- Born: November 16, 1818 Glastonbury, Connecticut, United States
- Died: October 29, 1901 (aged 82) Brookline, Massachusetts, United States
- Resting place: Warren, Rhode Island
- Party: Free Soil (until 1854); Whig (1854‍–‍1855); Know Nothing (1855‍–‍1857); Republican (from 1857)
- Spouses: Martha Hollister (m. 1839; died 1841); Betsey Herrick (m. 1846; died 1852); Annie Eddy (m. 1865)
- Education: Wilbraham Academy; Suffield Academy
- Occupation: Clergyman; politician; newspaper publisher; manufacturer; author

Sidney Dean (November 16, 1818 – October 29, 1901) was a United States representative from Connecticut.

== Childhood and education ==
Dean was born in Glastonbury, Connecticut, where he attended the common schools and Wilbraham and Suffield Academies.

== Early career ==
Dean was a minister in the Methodist Episcopal Church from 1843 to 1853, when he retired from the ministry because of impaired health. After leaving the ministry, he engaged in manufacturing in Putnam, Connecticut.

== Politics and later life ==
Dean was a member of the Connecticut House of Representatives in 1854 and 1855. He was elected as the candidate of the American Party to the Thirty-fourth Congress and as a Republican to the Thirty-fifth Congress (March 4, 1855 – March 3, 1859). In Congress, he served as chairman, Committee on Public Expenditures (Thirty-fourth Congress). He declined to be a candidate for renomination in 1858.

In 1860, Dean reentered the ministry, with pastorates in Pawtucket, Rhode Island, Providence, Rhode Island, and finally in Warren, Rhode Island. During the period 1865-1880, he engaged as editor of the Providence Press, Providence Star, and Rhode Island Press. He also served in the Rhode Island Senate in 1870 and 1871. He also engaged in literary pursuits and lecturing.

He died in Brookline, Massachusetts in 1901 and was buried in South Cemetery, Warren, Rhode Island.

U.S. House of Representatives
Preceded by Nathan Belcher	Member of the U.S. House of Representatives from Connecticut's 3rd congressional district 1855–1859	Succeeded by Alfred A. Burnham
