= 1841 Connecticut gubernatorial election =

- April 5, 1841
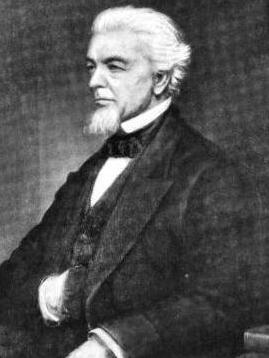

Nominee	William W. Ellsworth	Francis H. Nicoll
Party	Whig	Democratic
Popular vote	26,986	21,388
Percentage	55.79%	44.21%
- Ellsworth: 40–50% 50–60% 60–70% 70–80% 80–90% Nicoll: 40–50% 50–60% 60–70% Tie: 40–50%
Governor before election
William W. Ellsworth
Whig
Elected Governor
William W. Ellsworth
Whig

The 1841 Connecticut gubernatorial election was held on April 5, 1841. Incumbent governor and Whig nominee William W. Ellsworth was re-elected, defeating businessman and Democratic nominee Francis H. Nicoll with 55.79% of the vote.

This was the largest percentage of the vote achieved by the Whig Party in a Connecticut election for governor.

Nicoll had made his fortune in New York City, and moved back to his home town of Stafford some time before 1841. He died on September 27, 1842, at the age of 57.

== General election ==
=== Candidates ===
Major party candidates

- William W. Ellsworth, Whig
- Francis H. Nicoll, Democratic

=== Results ===
1841 Connecticut gubernatorial election
Party	Candidate	Votes	%	±%
Whig	William W. Ellsworth (incumbent)	26,986	55.79%	
Democratic	Francis H. Nicoll	21,388	44.21%	
Majority		5,598		
Turnout				
Whig hold		Swing		
