= 1845 Connecticut gubernatorial election =

- April 7, 1845
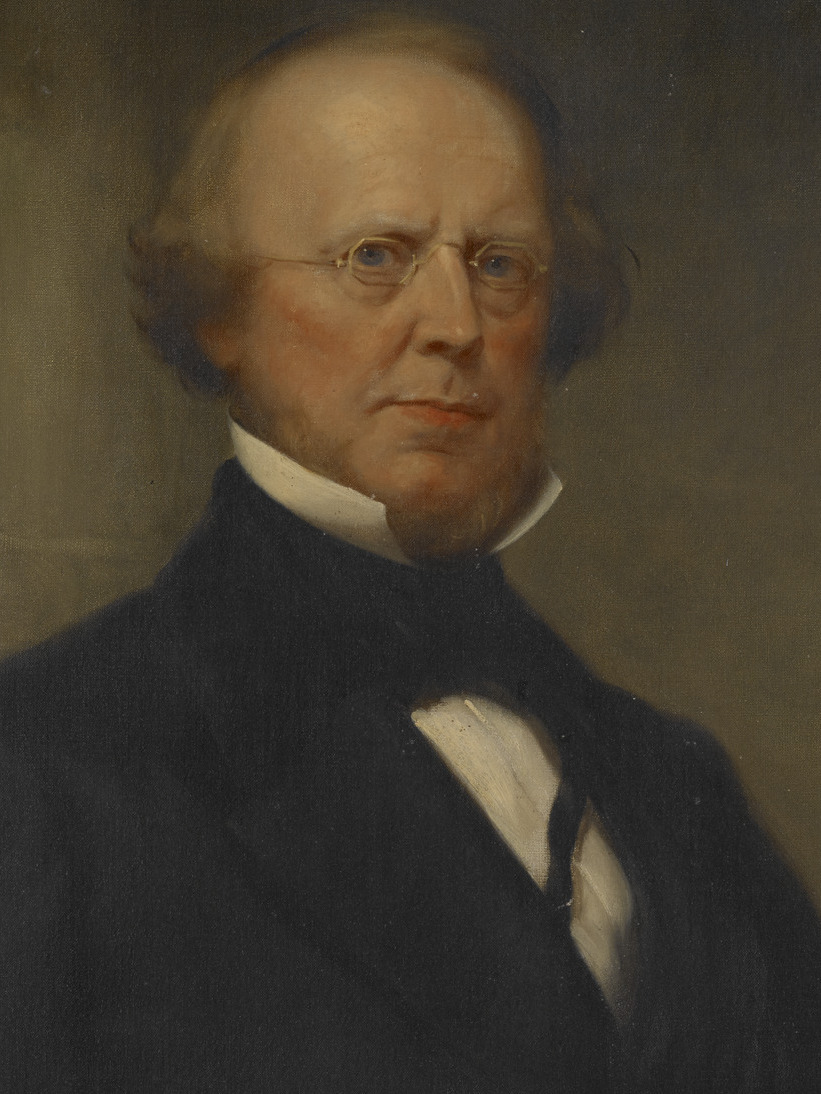

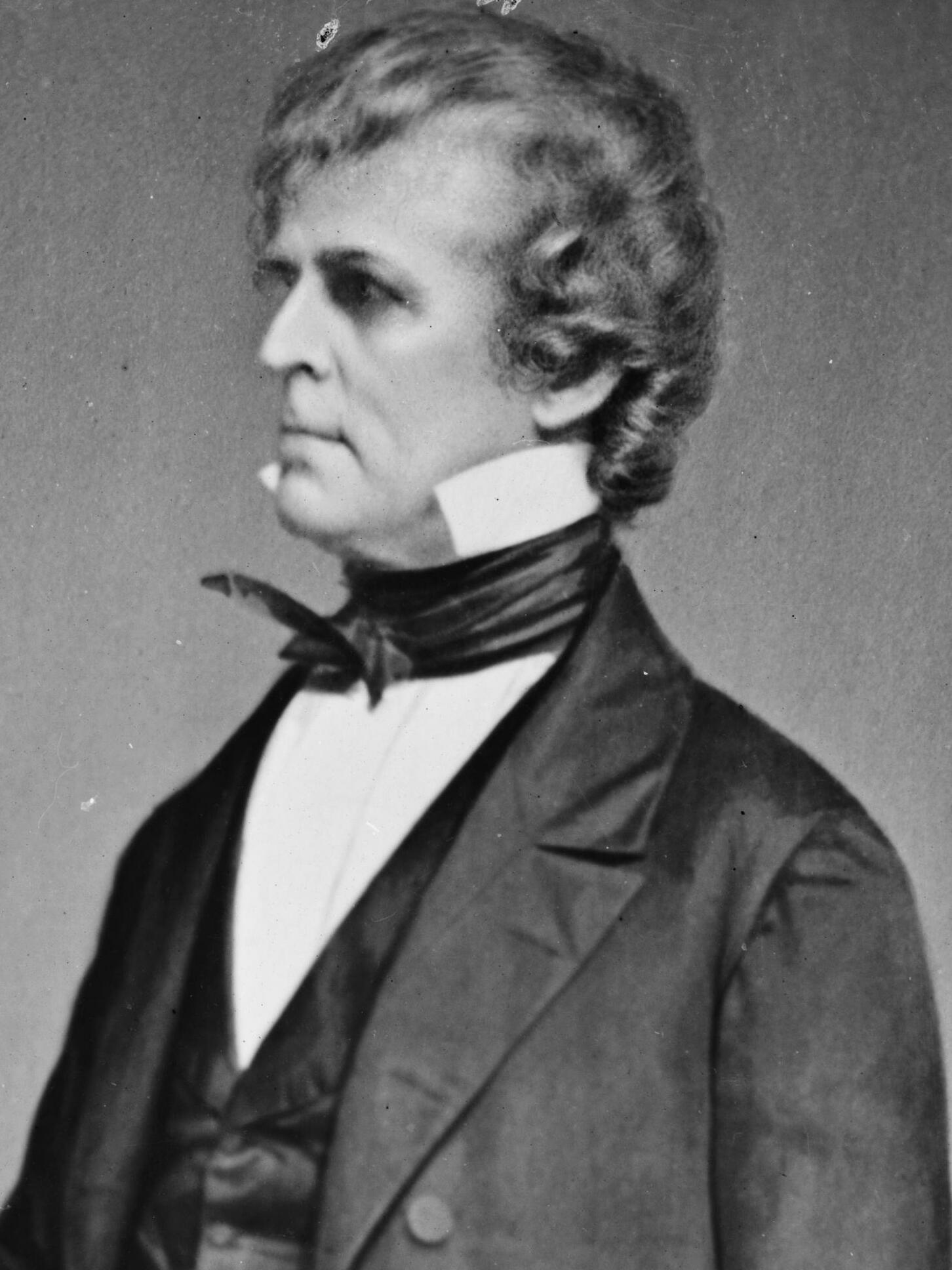
Nominee	Roger Sherman Baldwin	Isaac Toucey
Party	Whig	Democratic
Popular vote	29,508	26,258
Percentage	51.00%	45.38%
- Trumbull: 40–50% 50–60% 60–70% 70–80% Seymour: 40–50% 50–60% 60–70% 70–80%
Governor before election
Roger Sherman Baldwin
Whig
Elected Governor
Roger Sherman Baldwin
Whig

The 1845 Connecticut gubernatorial election was held on April 7, 1845. Incumbent governor, Amistad lawyer and Whig nominee Roger Sherman Baldwin was re-elected, defeating former congressman and Democratic nominee Isaac Toucey with 51.00% of the vote.

== General election ==
=== Candidates ===
Major party candidates

- Roger Sherman Baldwin, Whig
- Isaac Toucey, Democratic

Minor party candidates

- Francis Gillette, Liberty

=== Results ===
1845 Connecticut gubernatorial election
Party	Candidate	Votes	%	±%
Whig	Roger Sherman Baldwin (incumbent)	29,508	51.00%	
Democratic	Isaac Toucey	26,258	45.38%	
Liberty	Francis Gillette	2,099	3.63%	
Majority		3,250		
Turnout				
Whig hold		Swing		
