= Nathan Belcher =

American politician (1813–1891)

Member of the U.S. House of Representatives from Connecticut's 3rd district
- In office March 4, 1853 – March 3, 1855
- Preceded by: Chauncey Fitch Cleveland
- Succeeded by: Sidney Dean

Personal details
- Born: June 23, 1813 Preston, Connecticut, U.S.
- Died: June 2, 1891 (aged 77) New London, Connecticut, U.S.
- Party: Democratic

Nathan Belcher (June 23, 1813 – June 2, 1891) was a United States representative from Connecticut. He was born in Preston, Connecticut. He completed academic studies and was graduated from Amherst College in 1832. Later, he studied law at the Cambridge Law School before being admitted to the bar in 1836. He commenced practice in Clinton, Connecticut before he moved in 1841 to New London, Connecticut where he engaged in manufacturing tools, hardware, and kitchen utensils.

Belcher was a member of the Connecticut House of Representatives 1846 and 1847 and also served in the Connecticut Senate in 1850. He was elected as a Democrat to the Thirty-third Congress (March 4, 1853 – March 3, 1855) and was not a candidate for renomination in 1854. He resumed his former manufacturing pursuits and also engaged in banking. Belcher died in New London, Connecticut in 1891 and was buried in Cedar Grove Cemetery.

U.S. House of Representatives
Preceded by Chauncey Fitch Cleveland	Member of the U.S. House of Representatives from Connecticut's 3rd congressional district 1853—1855	Succeeded by Sidney Dean
