= USS Toucey =

Clemson-class destroyer

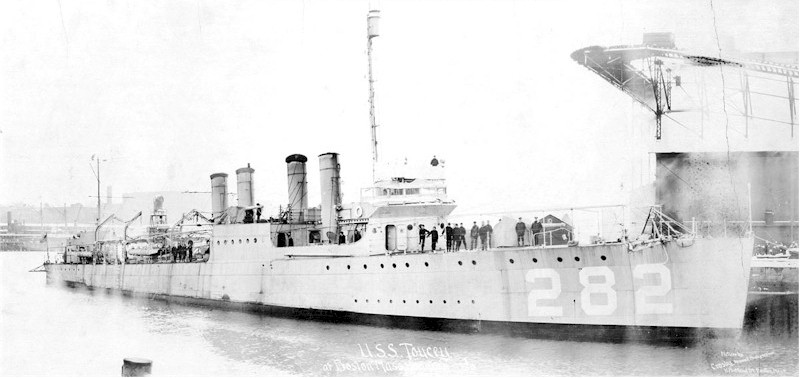

History

United States
- Namesake: Isaac Toucey
- Builder: Bethlehem Shipbuilding Corporation, Squantum Victory Yard
- Laid down: 26 April 1919
- Launched: 5 September 1919
- Commissioned: 9 December 1919
- Decommissioned: 1 May 1930
- Stricken: 22 October 1930
- Fate: Sold for scrap, 17 January 1931

General characteristics
- Class & type: Clemson-class destroyer
- Displacement: 1,215 tons
- Length: 314 ft 4 1/2 in (95.8 m)
- Beam: 30 ft 11 1/2 in (9.44 m)
- Draft: 9 ft 9 3/4 in (2.991 m)
- Propulsion: 26,500 shp (20 MW); geared turbines, 2 screws
- Speed: 35 kn (65 km/h)
- Range: 4,900 nmi @ 15 kn (9,100 km @ 28 km/h)
- Complement: 122 officers and enlisted
- Armament: 4 × 4 in (100 mm) guns, 1 × 3 in (76 mm) gun, 12 × 21 inch (533 mm) torpedo tubes

USS Toucey (DD-282) was a Clemson-class destroyer in the United States Navy following World War I. She was named for Secretary of the Navy Isaac Toucey.

Toucey was laid down on 26 April 1919 at Squantum, Massachusetts, by the Bethlehem Shipbuilding Corporation, launched on 5 September 1919, sponsored by Miss Elizabeth Alden Robinson, and commissioned at Boston, Massachusetts, on 9 December 1919.

== Service history ==
Soon after commissioning, Toucey began duty with the Atlantic Fleet as a unit of Division 42, Flotilla 7, Squadron 1. Based at Newport, Rhode Island, for the next seven years, she operated along the eastern seaboard and in the West Indies. During the summer, the destroyer patrolled the northern latitudes off the New England coast, training in destroyer operations. Each winter, she headed south for the annual fleet concentration held in waters near the Panama Canal and for gunnery training at the range near Puerto Rico. Sometime between 1 July 1921 and 1 January 1922, she was reassigned to Division 25 of Squadron 9 and began operating with only 50 percent of her normal complement. However, by 1 January 1923, her full complement had been restored and, still assigned to the same squadron and division; she began operating with the newly organized Scouting Force.

Late in 1926, she appears to have been temporarily assigned to the American naval forces operating in Europe. By 1 January 1927, her base of operations had been moved from Newport, to Norfolk, Virginia. From the sketchy records which exist, she appears to have served the remainder of her career with the Scouting Force destroyers operating out of Norfolk.

== Fate ==
In the spring of 1930, she moved to Philadelphia to prepare for inactivation. On 1 May 1930, Toucey was decommissioned at Philadelphia. Her name was struck from the Navy list on 22 October. The former destroyer was sold on 17 January 1931 and scrapped sometime in 1934.

As of 2019, no other ships have been named Toucey. Saginaw was launched as Toucey, but her name was changed prior to commissioning at the request of her namesake.
