= 1844 United States elections =

- ← 1842 1843 1844 1845 1846 → Presidential election year
- Incumbent president: John Tyler (Independent)
- Next Congress: 29th

Presidential election
- Partisan control: Democratic gain
- Popular vote margin: Democratic +1.4%
- Electoral vote
- James K. Polk (D): 170
- Henry Clay (W): 105
- 1844 presidential election results. Blue denotes states won by Polk, buff denotes states won by Clay. Numbers indicate the electoral votes won by each candidate.

Senate elections
- Overall control: Democratic gain
- Seats contested: 18 of 54 seats
- Net seat change: Democratic +3

House elections
- Overall control: Democratic hold
- Seats contested: All 227 voting members
- Net seat change: Whig +7

Elections for the 29th United States Congress, were held in 1844 and 1845, and took place during the Second Party System in the midst of the debate over whether to annex Texas. Texas and Iowa joined the union during the 29th Congress. Democrats retained control of the House and took back control of the presidency and the Senate, re-establishing the dominant position the party had lost in the 1840 election.

In the presidential election, Democratic former Speaker of the House James K. Polk defeated Whig former Senator Henry Clay of Kentucky. Though Polk won the popular vote by a little over one percent, he won by a comfortable margin in the electoral college. James G. Birney of the nascent Liberty Party took two percent of the popular vote, and may have swung the election by taking votes from Clay in New York. The little-known Polk defeated several rivals to win his party's nomination, emerging as the first dark horse nominee in U.S. presidential history. Incumbent President John Tyler, who had been expelled from the Whig party early in his presidency, was briefly the candidate of the newly formed Democratic-Republican Party, but dropped out of the race after Polk announced his support for ratification of Tyler's Texas annexation treaty.

In the House, Whigs picked up a small number of seats, but Democrats retained a commanding majority.

In the Senate, Democrats picked up several seats, re-taking the majority.

== See also ==
- 1844 United States presidential election
- 1844–45 United States House of Representatives elections
- 1844–45 United States Senate elections
