= 1844 Connecticut gubernatorial election =

- April 1, 1844
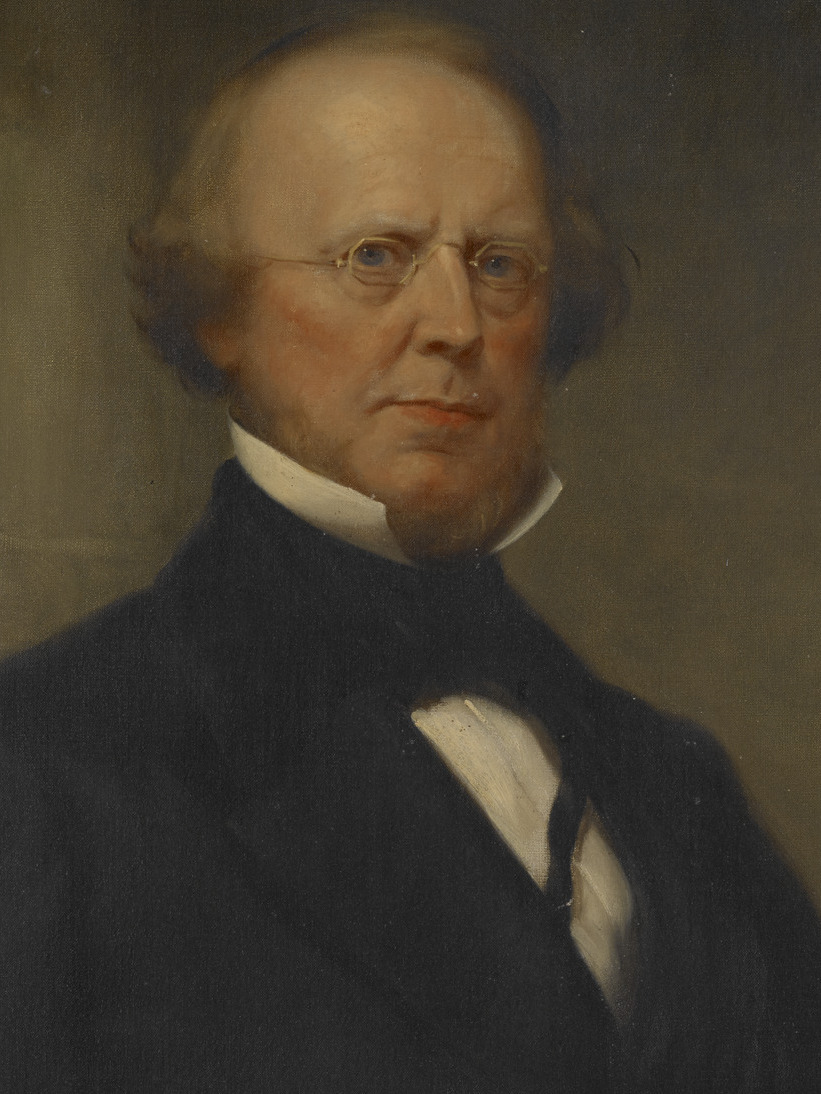

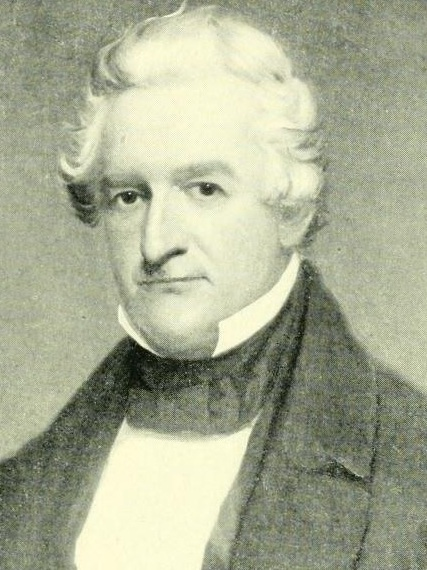
Nominee	Roger Sherman Baldwin	Chauncey Fitch Cleveland
Party	Whig	Democratic
Electoral vote	116	93
Popular vote	30,093	28,846
Percentage	49.41%	47.36%
- Baldwin: 40–50% 50–60% 60–70% 70–80% Cleveland: 40–50% 50–60% 60–70% 70–80% Tie: 50%
Governor before election
Chauncey Fitch Cleveland
Democratic
Elected Governor
Roger Sherman Baldwin
Whig

The 1844 Connecticut gubernatorial election was held on April 1, 1844. Former state legislator, Amistad lawyer and Whig nominee Roger Sherman Baldwin was elected, defeating incumbent governor and Democratic nominee Chauncey Fitch Cleveland with 49.41% of the vote.

Although Baldwin won a plurality of the vote, he fell short of a majority. The state constitution at the time required that in such a case, the Connecticut General Assembly decides the election. The state legislature voted for Baldwin, 116 to 93, and Baldwin became the governor.

== General election ==
=== Candidates ===
Major party candidates

- Roger Sherman Baldwin, Whig
- Chauncey Fitch Cleveland, Democratic

Minor party candidates

- Francis Gillette, Liberty

=== Results ===
1844 Connecticut gubernatorial election
Party	Candidate	Votes	%	±%
Whig	Roger Sherman Baldwin	30,093	49.41%	
Democratic	Chauncey Fitch Cleveland (incumbent)	28,846	47.36%	
Liberty	Francis Gillette	1,971	3.24%	
Plurality		1,247		
Turnout				

1844 Connecticut gubernatorial election, contingent General Assembly election
Party	Candidate	Votes	%	±%
Whig	Roger Sherman Baldwin	116	55.50%	
Democratic	Chauncey Fitch Cleveland (incumbent)	93	44.50%	
Majority		23		
Whig gain from Democratic		Swing		
