= 1843 New Jersey gubernatorial election =

- October 27, 1843
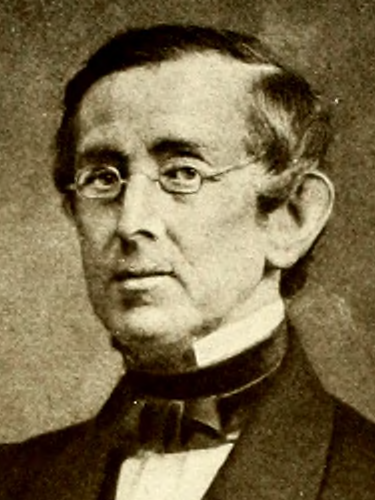

Nominee	Daniel Haines	William Pennington
Party	Democratic	Whig
Governor before election
William Pennington
Whig
Elected Governor
Daniel Haines
Democratic

The 1843 New Jersey gubernatorial election was held on October 27, 1843, in order to elect the Governor of New Jersey. Democratic nominee Daniel Haines defeated Whig Party nominee, William Pennington after receiving a majority of the votes in a General Assembly vote. This was the last election held before the New Jersey Constitution of 1844.

== General election ==
The Democratic Party won control of the New Jersey Legislative Council in 1843. On October 27, 1843, former member of the New Jersey Legislative Council from Sussex County, Daniel Haines, was nominated as the Democratic candidate in a meeting of the legislative caucus. Meanwhile, the Whig Party nominated the incumbent Governor William Pennington. Haines was elected and sworn in as the 14th Governor of New Jersey that same day.

=== Results ===
New Jersey gubernatorial election, 1843
Party	Candidate	Votes	%
Democratic	Daniel Haines	44	62.9%
Whig	William Pennington	26	37.1%
Total votes		70	100.00%
Democratic gain from Whig			

== Sources ==
- Sobel, Robert (1978). Biographical directory of the governors of the United States, 1789-1978, Vol. III. Meckler Books. ISBN 9780930466008.
