= 1844 Missouri lieutenant gubernatorial election =

- August 5, 1844
Nominee	James Young
Party	Democratic
Popular vote	Unknown
Percentage	100.00%
Lieutenant Governor before election
Meredith Marmaduke
Democratic
Elected Lieutenant Governor
James Young
Democratic

The 1844 Missouri lieutenant gubernatorial election was held on August 5, 1844, in order to elect the lieutenant governor of Missouri. Democratic nominee and incumbent member of the Missouri Senate James Young won the election as he ran unopposed. The exact results of the election are unknown.

== General election ==
On election day, August 5, 1844, Democratic nominee James Young won the election as he ran unopposed, thereby retaining Democratic control over the office of lieutenant governor. Young was sworn in as the 7th lieutenant governor of Missouri on November 20, 1844.

=== Results ===
Missouri lieutenant gubernatorial election, 1844
Party	Candidate	Votes	%
Democratic	James Young	Unknown	100.00
Total votes		Unknown	100.00
Democratic hold			

== See also ==
- 1844 Missouri gubernatorial election
