= 1844 Salvadoran presidential election =

- 5 February 1844
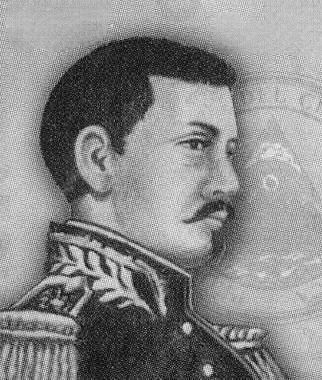
| Candidate | Francisco Malespín |
| Party | Conservative/Military |
| Running mate | Luis Ayala |
President before election
Fermín Palacios
Independent
Elected President
Francisco Malespín
Conservative/Military

Presidential elections were held in El Salvador on 5 February 1844. General Francisco Malespín ran unopposed and was elected by the legislature. Malespín was sworn in on 7 February 1844 and served until 15 February 1845, when he was deposed by his vice president Joaquín Eufrasio Guzmán.

== Results ==
| Candidate | Party |
|---|---|
| Francisco Malespín | Conservative/Military |
Total
Source: University of California, San Diego
