= 1843 Rhode Island gubernatorial election =

- April 5, 1843
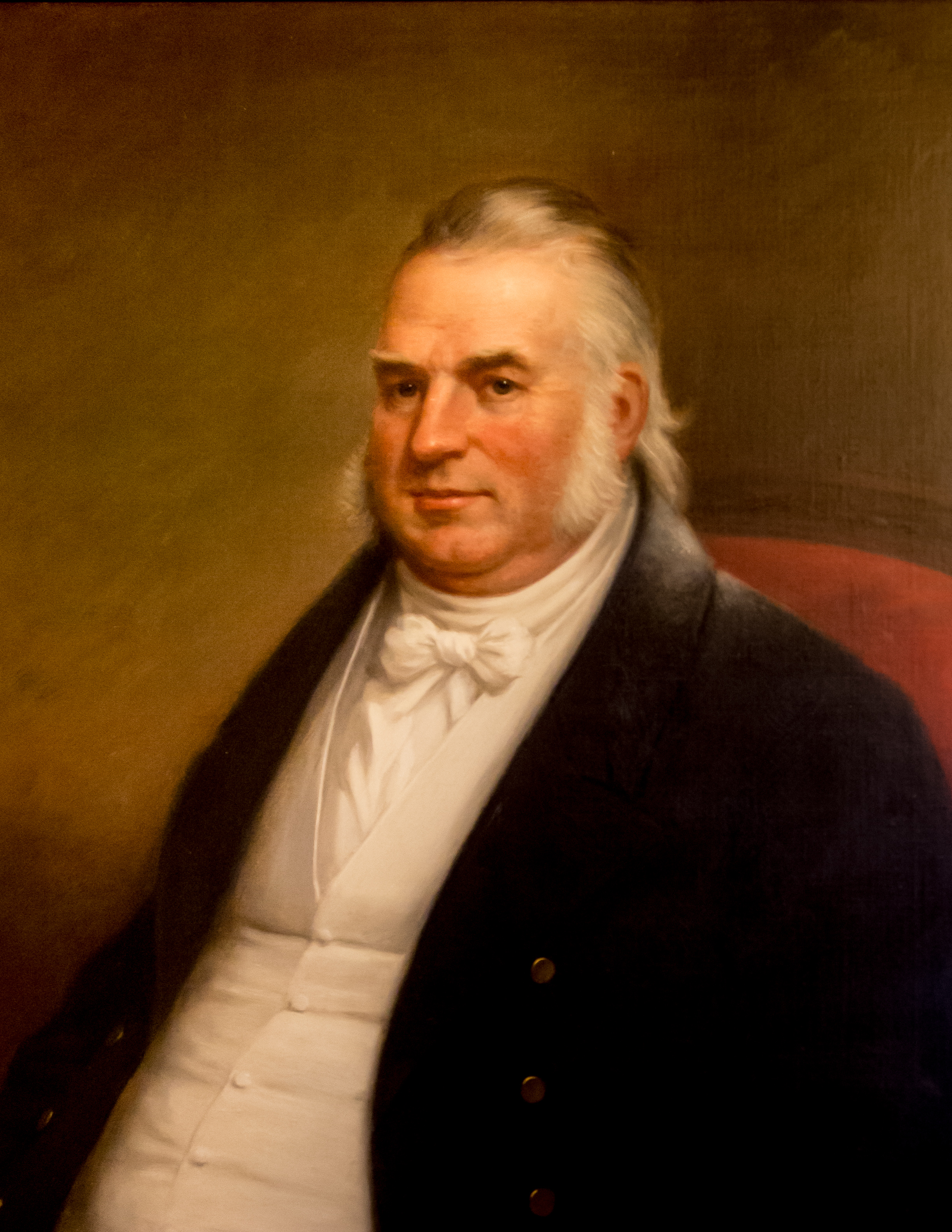

Nominee	James Fenner	Thomas F. Carpenter
Party	Law and Order	Democratic
Popular vote	9,107	7,392
Percentage	55.18%	44.79%
- County results Fenner: 60–70% 80–90% Carpenter: 50–60%
Governor before election
Samuel Ward King
Whig
Elected Governor
James Fenner
Law and Order

The 1843 Rhode Island gubernatorial election was held on April 5, 1843, in order to elect the governor of Rhode Island. Law and Order nominee and former governor James Fenner defeated Democratic nominee Thomas F. Carpenter.

== General election ==
On election day, April 5, 1843, Law and Order nominee and former governor James Fenner won the election by a margin of 1,715 votes against his opponent Democratic nominee Thomas F. Carpenter, thereby gaining Law and Order control over the office of governor. Fenner was sworn in for his twelfth overall term on May 2, 1843.

=== Results ===
Rhode Island gubernatorial election, 1843
Party	Candidate	Votes	%
Law and Order	James Fenner	9,107	55.18
Democratic	Thomas F. Carpenter	7,392	44.79
	Scattering	5	0.03
Total votes		16,504	100.00
Law and Order gain from Whig			
