= 1843 Philadelphia mayoral election =

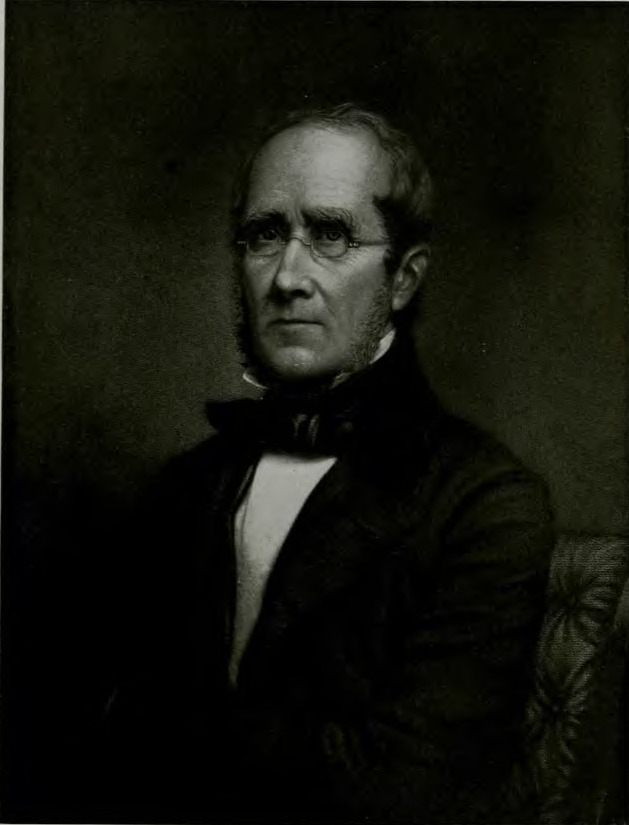

Nominee	John Morin Scott	Samuel H. Perkins
Popular vote	6,585	3,976
Percentage	62.33%	37.65%
Mayor before election
John Morin Scott
Whig
Elected mayor
John Morin Scott
Whig

The 1843 Philadelphia mayoral election saw the reelection of John Morin Scott to a third consecutive term.

== Electoral system ==
Beginning in 1839, the city operated under a mixed electoral system. Citizens voted for mayor in a general election. If a candidate receive a majority of the vote, they would be elected mayor. However, if no candidate received a majority, the City Council would select a mayor from the top-two finishers.

== Results ==
1843 Philadelphia mayoral election results
Candidate	Votes	%
John Morin Scott (incumbent)	6,585	62.33%
Samuel H. Perkins	3,976	37.65%
Others	3	0.03%
Total votes	10,564	
