= 1843 Connecticut gubernatorial election =

- April 3, 1843
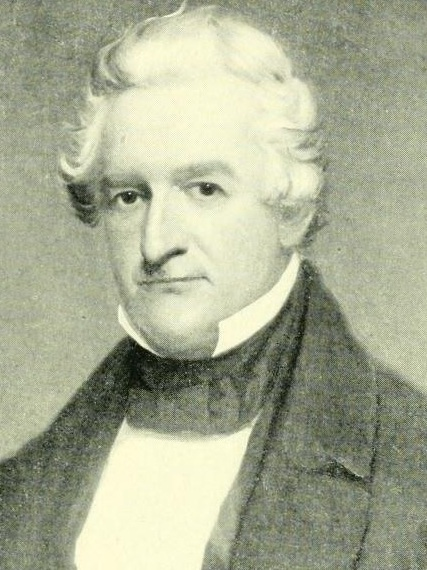

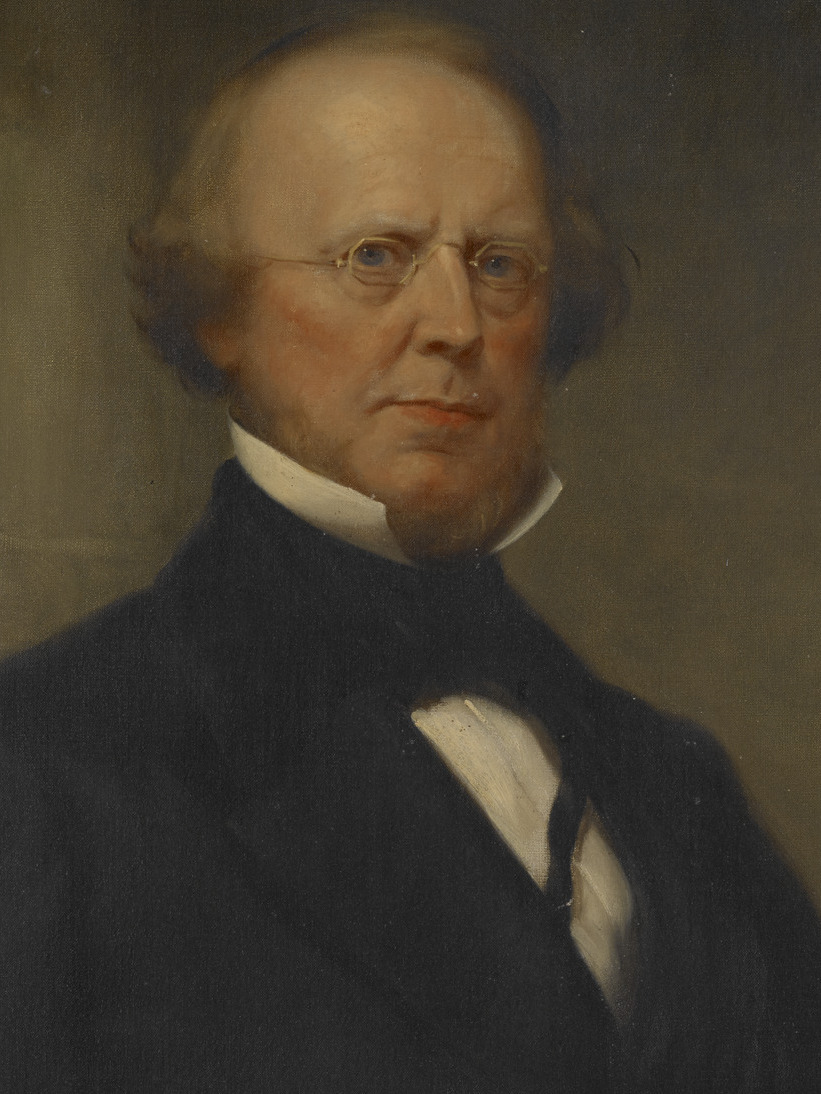
| Nominee | Chauncey Fitch Cleveland | Roger Sherman Baldwin |
| Party | Democratic | Whig |
| Popular vote | 27,416 | 25,401 |
| Percentage | 50.13% | 46.45% |
- Cleveland: 40–50% 50–60% 60–70% 70–80% Baldwin: 40–50% 50–60% 60–70% 70–80% Tie
Governor before election
Chauncey Fitch Cleveland
Democratic
Elected Governor
Chauncey Fitch Cleveland
Democratic

The 1843 Connecticut gubernatorial election was held on April 3, 1843. Incumbent governor and Democratic nominee Chauncey Fitch Cleveland was re-elected, defeating former state legislator, Amistad lawyer and Whig nominee Roger Sherman Baldwin with 50.13% of the vote.

== General election ==
=== Candidates ===
Major party candidates

- Chauncey Fitch Cleveland, Democratic
- Roger Sherman Baldwin, Whig

Minor party candidates

- Francis Gillette, Liberty

=== Results ===
1843 Connecticut gubernatorial election
| Party | Candidate | Votes | % | ±% |
|---|---|---|---|---|
| Democratic | Chauncey Fitch Cleveland (incumbent) | 27,416 | 50.13% | |
| Whig | Roger Sherman Baldwin | 25,401 | 46.45% | |
| Liberty | Francis Gillette | 1,872 | 3.42% | |
| Majority | | 2,015 | | |
| Turnout | | | | |
