= Henry Leavitt Ellsworth =

American politician

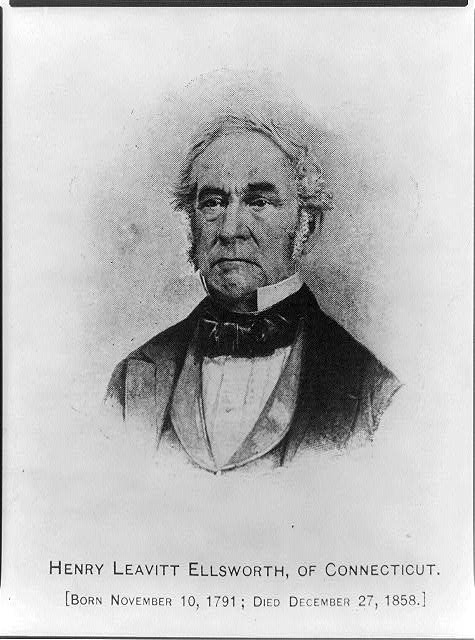
- Henry Leavitt Ellsworth, first Commissioner of the U.S. Patent Office, founder, United States Department of Agriculture
- Born: November 10, 1791. Windsor, Connecticut
- Died: December 27, 1858 (aged 67); Fair Haven, Connecticut
- Occupation: Attorney
- Known for: First Commissioner of the U.S. Patent Office
- Political party: Free Soil Party
- Children: 3, including Henry
- Relatives: Oliver Ellsworth (father); William W. Ellsworth (brother); Elizur Goodrich (father-in-law)

Henry Leavitt Ellsworth (November 10, 1791 – December 27, 1858) was a Yale-educated attorney who became the first Commissioner of the U.S. Patent Office, where he encouraged innovation by inventors Samuel F.B. Morse and Samuel Colt. Ellsworth also served as the second president of the Aetna Insurance Company, and was a major donor to Yale College, a commissioner to Indian tribes on the western frontier, and the founder of what became the United States Department of Agriculture.

== Early life ==
Ellsworth was born in Windsor, Connecticut, son of Founding Father and Chief Justice Oliver Ellsworth and Abigail Wolcott. Ellsworth graduated from Yale University in 1810, and studied law at Tapping Reeve's Litchfield Law School in 1811. On June 22, 1813, he married Nancy Allen Goodrich (daughter of Congressman, Judge, New Haven Mayor and longtime Secretary of the Yale Corporation Elizur Goodrich and his wife Anne Willard Allen) with whom Ellsworth had three children, including son Henry W. Ellsworth.

Later in life, he had two subsequent wives, Marietta Mariana Bartlett and Catherine Smith. Ellsworth was named in part for his grandmother's family, the Leavitts of Suffield, Connecticut. After studying law under Judge Gould in Litchfield, Connecticut, he settled first at Windsor and then at Hartford, where he remained for a decade.

== Travels ==
In 1811, when he was 19 years old and a freshly minted Yale graduate, Ellsworth undertook the first of several western trips during his lifetime. Ellsworth traveled by horseback to the Connecticut Western Reserve in present-day Ohio to investigate family lands in the region. Ellsworth's father Oliver Ellsworth had purchased over 41,000 acres (170 km^{2}) in the Western Reserve, including most of present-day Cleveland, joining with other prominent Connecticut men snapping up over three million acres (12,000 km^{2}) sold by the state of Connecticut. (Among the eight original purchasers was a family relation, merchant Thaddeus Leavitt of Suffield.) Ellsworth wrote a small, uneven book about his experiences entitled A Tour to New Connecticut in 1811. Ellsworth's mission was straightening out irregularities in land sales by the family agent.

It was an arduous trip. Along the way Ellsworth made note of attractive vistas, rowdy drunks, solicitous innkeepers and his disappointment in places of which he had heard, like Erie. The journey's rigors were relieved by a meeting with his old friend Margaret Dwight, daughter of Yale president Timothy Dwight IV, who was visiting family in present-day Warren, Ohio. "Here too", wrote Ellsworth, "I met with my good old friend Margaret Dwight, we sat down and passed a few hours in social chat." Dwight wrote her own account of her Western Reserve trip, A Journey to Ohio in 1810.

Over twenty years later, in 1832, Ellsworth traveled west again, this time as U.S. Commissioner of Indian Tribes in Arkansas and Oklahoma. President Andrew Jackson appointed Ellsworth one of three commissioners to "study the country, to mark the boundaries, to pacify the warring Indians and, in general to establish order and justice" after Congress's passage of the 1830 Indian Removal Act. Ellsworth travelled to Fort Gibson to investigate the situation. (Some critics blame Ellsworth for being complicit in the subsequent removal of Native Americans to Indian Territory, present-day Oklahoma, particularly since Ellsworth's appointment and subsequent western trip followed the Indian Removal Act, Andrew Jackson's first significant act as president. Other historians note Ellsworth's sympathetic outlook towards the tribes.)

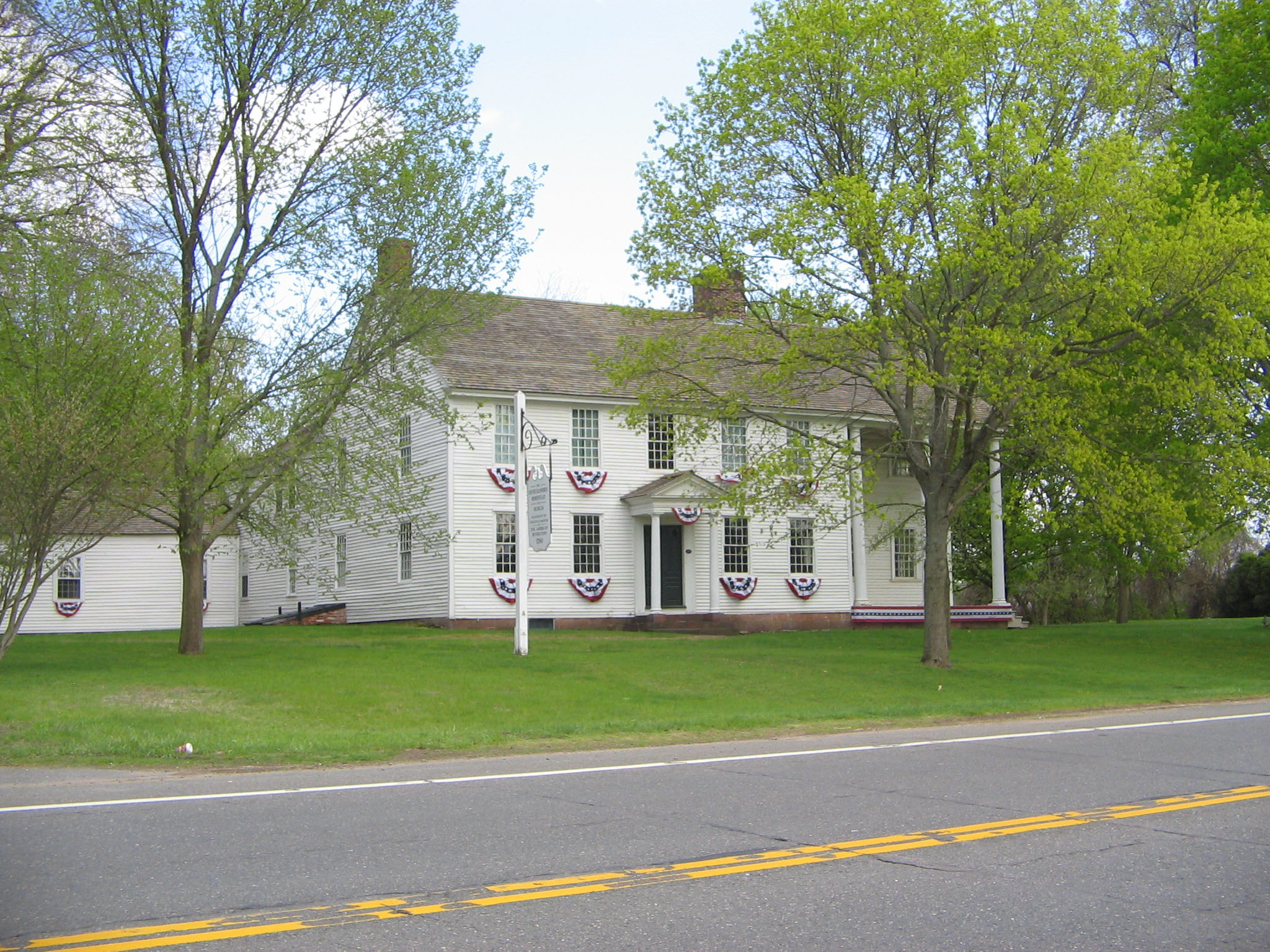
Oliver Ellsworth Homestead, Windsor, Connecticut, birthplace of Henry Leavitt Ellsworth, National Historic Landmark

Along the way, Ellsworth made stops in Cincinnati and Louisville, then traveled on to St. Louis, Missouri, where he met with explorer William Clark and saw the recently captured Native American leader Black Hawk, chief of the Sauk people. Leavitt's mission was a complicated one: he was charged with trying to mediate between the conflicting claims of several Indian tribes, who were being forced into an ever-smaller area, in competition with newer immigrants and the interests of the Chouteau family, the powerful St. Louis magnates of the Midwestern fur trade.

Ellsworth was accompanied on the expedition by three companions: author Washington Irving, who recorded his impressions in A Tour on the Prairies; Charles La Trobe, an Englishman, mountaineer and travel writer who later served in the British diplomatic corps in the West Indies and Australia; and Swiss Count Albert Pourtales.

Washington Irving wrote of Henry Leavitt Ellsworth, "this worthy leader of our little band": "He was a native of one of the towns of Connecticut, a man in whom a course of legal practice and political life had not been able to vitiate an innate simplicity and benevolence of heart. The greater part of his days had been passed in the bosom of his family and the society of deacons, elders, and statesmen, on the peaceful banks of the Connecticut; when suddenly he had been called to mount his steed, shoulder his rifle and mingle among stark hunters, backwoodsmen, and naked savages, on the trackless wilds of the Far West."

== Patent Office ==
In 1835, Ellsworth was elected mayor of Hartford, Connecticut, but had served only a month when he was appointed the first Commissioner of the U.S. Patent Office, an office he held for ten years, from 1835 until 1845. His twin brother William W. Ellsworth was Governor of Connecticut from 1838 to 1842, and served as a U.S. Congressman from Connecticut as well. William Wolcott Ellsworth was married to the daughter of Noah Webster, the publisher of the eponymous dictionaries.

When he arrived at the Patent Office, Ellsworth found one third of the floor-space in his office occupied by over 60 models of inventions; he moved them to a separate room. He also found that no list of patent applicants had ever been drawn up, a deficiency he soon corrected.

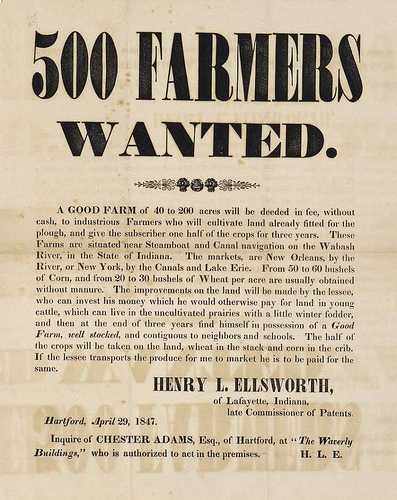
Broadside advertising sale by Ellsworth of parcels of his western lands, Lafayette, Indiana, 1847

Acting as Patent Commissioner, Ellsworth made a decision that profoundly affected the future of Hartford and Connecticut. The young Samuel Colt was struggling to establish a firm to manufacture his new revolver. Ellsworth became interested in Colt's invention, and in 1836 made the decision to issue Colt U.S. Patent No. 138. On the basis of Ellsworth's decision, Colt was able to raise some $200,000 from investors to incorporate the Patent Arms Manufacturing Company of Paterson, New Jersey, the forerunner of the mighty Colt arms manufacturing empire.

In today's world Ellsworth would be described as an early technology adapter. He became so interested, for instance, in a new-fangled invention by Samuel Morse called the telegraph that Ellsworth petitioned Congress for a $30,000 grant to test the possibilities of the technology.

From Ellsworth's exposure to the West and knowledge of inventions, he prophesied late in life that the lands of the West would be cultivated by means of steam plows. This prophecy was introduced in the probate of his will in an attempt to prove that he was of unsound mind.

Ellsworth was proven correct, of course, and his interest in agriculture during his time as Patent Commissioner induced Congress in 1839 to appropriate the first monies for farming, which were used to collect seeds from foreign countries and distribute them through the United States post office, as Ellsworth had urged. By 1845 Ellsworth's patent office was performing the functions of a full-fledged agricultural bureau. For this accomplishment Ellsworth earned the sobriquet "Father of the United States Department of Agriculture."

A comment by Ellsworth about the increased workload at the patent office, taken out of context and embellished, was apparently the source of an urban legend that a patent office official (Charles H. Duell in some versions) claimed that everything which could be invented had already been invented. In his 1843 report to Congress, Ellsworth stated: "The advancement of the arts, from year to year, taxes our credulity and seems to presage the arrival of that period when human improvement must end." The report then lists a record number of patents, implying his comment was intended to be humorous.

Following Ellsworth's stint in the Patent Office, he settled in Lafayette, Indiana, acting as an agent for purchase and settlement of public land, but in 1857 he returned to Connecticut. While in Indiana, he served as a presidential elector on the Free Soil Party ticket in 1848. Ellsworth later served as an early president of the Aetna Insurance Company. He was an early benefactor of Yale College, donating some $700,000 to his alma mater, as well as title to the Ellsworth lands in the former Western Reserve.

== Legacy ==
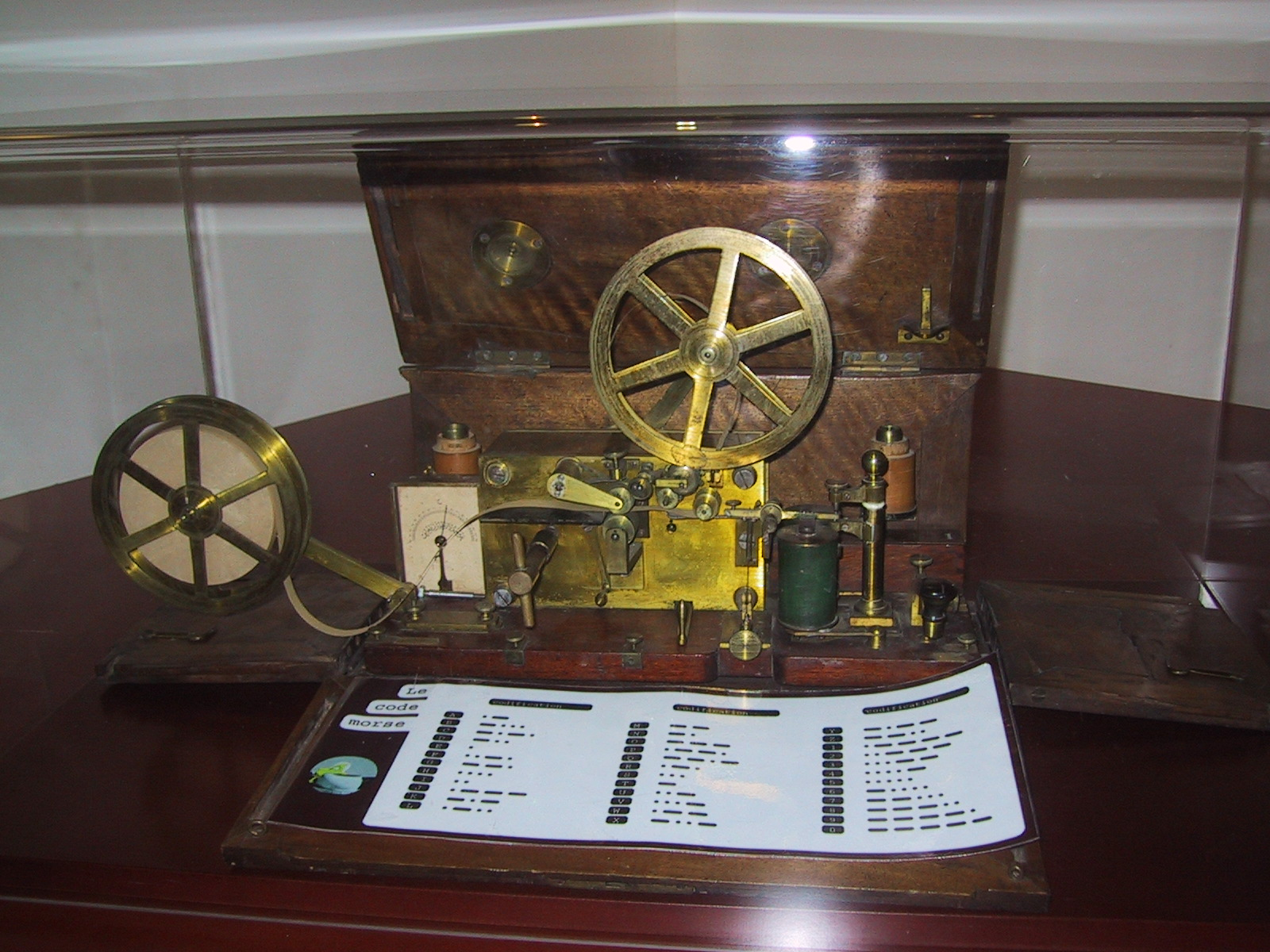
The Morse Telegraph, one of many inventions championed by Henry Leavitt Ellsworth

Ellsworth died, aged 67, on December 27, 1858, in Fair Haven, Connecticut. Following his death, Ellsworth's papers were discovered among the family papers of the Goodrich family. Ellsworth was a Yale classmate of Chauncey Allen Goodrich, whose sister Nancy Henry Leavitt Ellsworth married. The journal of Ellsworth's first trip to New Connecticut came to the Yale University Library as part of the Goodrich Family Collection. The former patent commissioner's papers today make up the Henry Leavitt Ellsworth Papers at Yale's Sterling Library. Annie Goodrich Ellsworth, only daughter of Henry Leavitt Ellsworth, married the publisher Roswell Smith, who with his partner Josiah Gilbert Holland founded, in partnership with the publishing house Charles Scribner & Co., Scribner's Monthly and St. Nicholas magazines. Later Smith founded the publishing house The Century Company, and assumed sole ownership of both magazines. He changed the name of Scribner's Monthly to The Century. His wife, the former Anna G. Ellsworth, dictated the inaugural message on Samuel F. B. Morse's new telegraph system. "What hath God wrought" read the message, suggested by her mother, the wife of Morse's great champion Henry Leavitt Ellsworth. The daughter of Roswell Smith and Anna G. Leavitt married the American artist landscape painter George Inness, Jr.

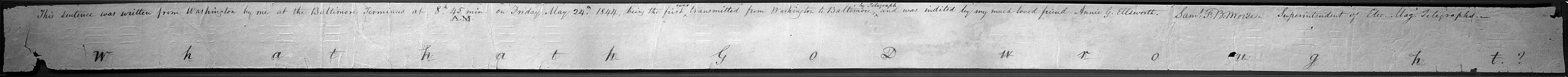
Text of the first telegraph message sent by Samuel F. B. Morse. Presented to Miss Annie G. Ellsworth, daughter of Henry Leavitt Ellsworth. Annie's ink tracing over Morse's pencilled letters. Gift to Library of Congress by Mrs. George Inness, daughter of Annie Ellsworth

== See also ==
- Patent Office 1877 fire
- Patent Office 1836 fire
