= Noyes Billings =

American politician

Noyes Billings (March 31, 1800 – April 26, 1865) was an American politician who was the 39th Lieutenant Governor of Connecticut from 1846 to 1847.

== Early life ==
Noyes Billings was born in Stonington, Connecticut on March 31, 1800, to Coddington Billings and Eunice Williams. Noyes and his younger brother William W. Billings graduated from Yale and moved to New London, Connecticut, to establish themselves in business. Their whaling and shipping company N. & W. W. Billings was established in 1823 and was one of the most successful whaling agencies in New London; it would cease operations in 1851. In October 1826, Noyes married Isabelle Stuart.

== Political career ==
Billings was the mayor of New London from 1835 to 1837. He was a member of the Connecticut State Senate for the 7th District in 1844. He was elected lieutenant governor of Connecticut and served for one term, from May 6, 1846, to May 5, 1847, alongside governor Isaac Toucey.

== Later years ==
Billings died in New London on April 26, 1865.

== See also ==
- List of governors of Connecticut

Political offices
Preceded by Reuben Booth	Lieutenant Governor of Connecticut; 1846–1847	Succeeded by Charles J. McCurdy
