= Chauncey F. Cleveland =

American politician

Chauncey Fitch Cleveland
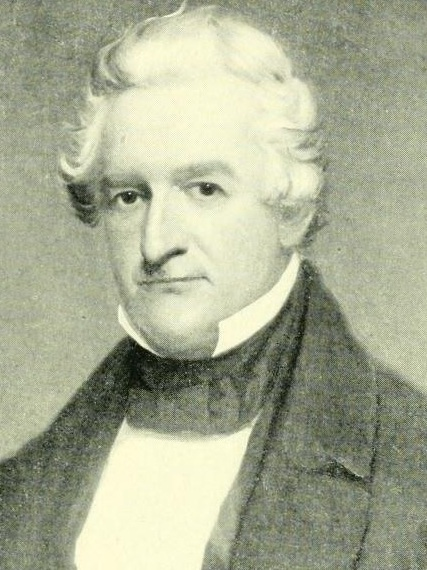

Member of the U.S. House of Representatives from Connecticut's 3rd district
- In office March 4, 1849 – March 3, 1853
- Preceded by: John A. Rockwell
- Succeeded by: Nathan Belcher

31st Governor of Connecticut
- In office May 4, 1842 – May 1, 1844
- Lieutenant: William S. Holabird
- Preceded by: William W. Ellsworth
- Succeeded by: Roger Sherman Baldwin

Member of the Connecticut House of Representatives
- In office 1826-1829; 1832; 1835; 1836; 1847; 1848

Personal details
- Born: February 16, 1799 Canterbury, Connecticut, US
- Died: June 6, 1887 (aged 88) Hampton, Connecticut, US
- Party: Democratic (1826–1853); Republican (1854–1887)
- Spouse(s): Diantha Hovey; Helen Cornelia Litchfield
- Profession: Lawyer, politician

Chauncey Fitch Cleveland (February 16, 1799 – June 6, 1887) was an American politician, a United States representative and the 31st governor of Connecticut.

== Biography ==
Born in Canterbury, Connecticut, Cleveland attended the common schools and taught school from the age of fifteen to twenty. He studied law, was admitted to the bar in 1819 and commenced practice in Hampton. He was married, December 13, 1821, to Diantha Hovey (1800–1867); was married, January 22, 1869, to Helen Cornelia Litchfield.

== Career ==
Cleveland was a member of the Connecticut House of Representatives from 1826 to 1829, 1832, 1835, 1836, 1838, 1847, and 1848, and served as its speaker in 1836 and 1838. He was state's attorney in 1832 and state bank commissioner in 1838. In 1841 he moved to Norwich, Connecticut.

Elected governor of the state by the Democratic party in 1842, and again in 1843, Cleveland was governor of Connecticut from May 4, 1842, to May 1, 1844. He then resumed the practice of law in Hampton.

Elected as a Democrat to the Thirty-first and Thirty-second Congresses, Cleveland held office from March 4, 1849, to March 3, 1853.

Previous to the breaking out of the Civil War, Cleveland had become affiliated with the Republican Party upon its organization. He was a strong supporter of the government during the war, and for several years thereafter he acted with that party. He was a delegate to the Republican National Conventions of 1856 and 1860, and was a Presidential Elector on the Republican ticket in 1860. In 1861, he was a member of the Peace Congress held in Washington, D.C., in an effort to devise means to prevent the impending war.

Cleveland was again a member of the state house of representatives in 1863 and 1866, serving as speaker in the former year. He retired from public life and engaged in agricultural pursuits and the practice of law.

== Death ==
Cleveland died in Hampton, Connecticut in 1887, aged 88. He is interred at South Cemetery there.

Party political offices
Preceded by Francis H. Nicoll	Democratic nominee for Governor of Connecticut; 1842, 1843, 1844	Succeeded by Isaac Toucey
U.S. House of Representatives
Preceded by John A. Rockwell	Member of the U.S. House of Representatives from Connecticut's 3rd congressional district 1849—1853	Succeeded by Nathan Belcher
Political offices
Preceded by William W. Ellsworth	Governor of Connecticut; 1842-1843	Succeeded by Roger Sherman Baldwin
