= Henry W. Ellsworth =

American poet

- Born: Henry William Ellsworth; May 14, 1814; Windsor, Connecticut, U.S.
- Died: August 14, 1864 (aged 50); New Haven, Connecticut, U.S.
- Occupations: Attorney; Author; Poet; Diplomat
- Relatives: Henry L. Ellsworth (father); Oliver Ellsworth (grandfather)

Henry William Ellsworth (May 14, 1814 – August 14, 1864) was an American attorney, writer, poet and diplomat who served as Minister to Sweden.

== Life and career ==
The grandson of Oliver Ellsworth and son of Henry L. Ellsworth, Henry William Ellsworth was born in Windsor, Connecticut on May 14, 1814. He graduated from Yale University in 1834, graduated from the New Haven Law School, and became an attorney in Lafayette, Indiana.

In 1844 he was a Democratic Presidential elector from Indiana. In 1845 he was appointed by President James K. Polk as Minister to Sweden and Norway, and he remained until 1849.

Upon returning to the United States, Ellsworth resumed practicing law, and was retained by Samuel F. B. Morse to handle several lawsuits concerning the validity of Morse's telegraph patents.

Ellsworth was a poet and frequent contributor to The Knickerbocker magazine. His best known poems include "Lines to an Absent Wife" and "The Cholera King". He was also an author of historical and other works, including 1838's "Valley of the Upper Wabash, Indiana".

Ellsworth died in New Haven, Connecticut on August 14, 1864.
