= Roger Sherman Baldwin =

American politician (1793–1863)

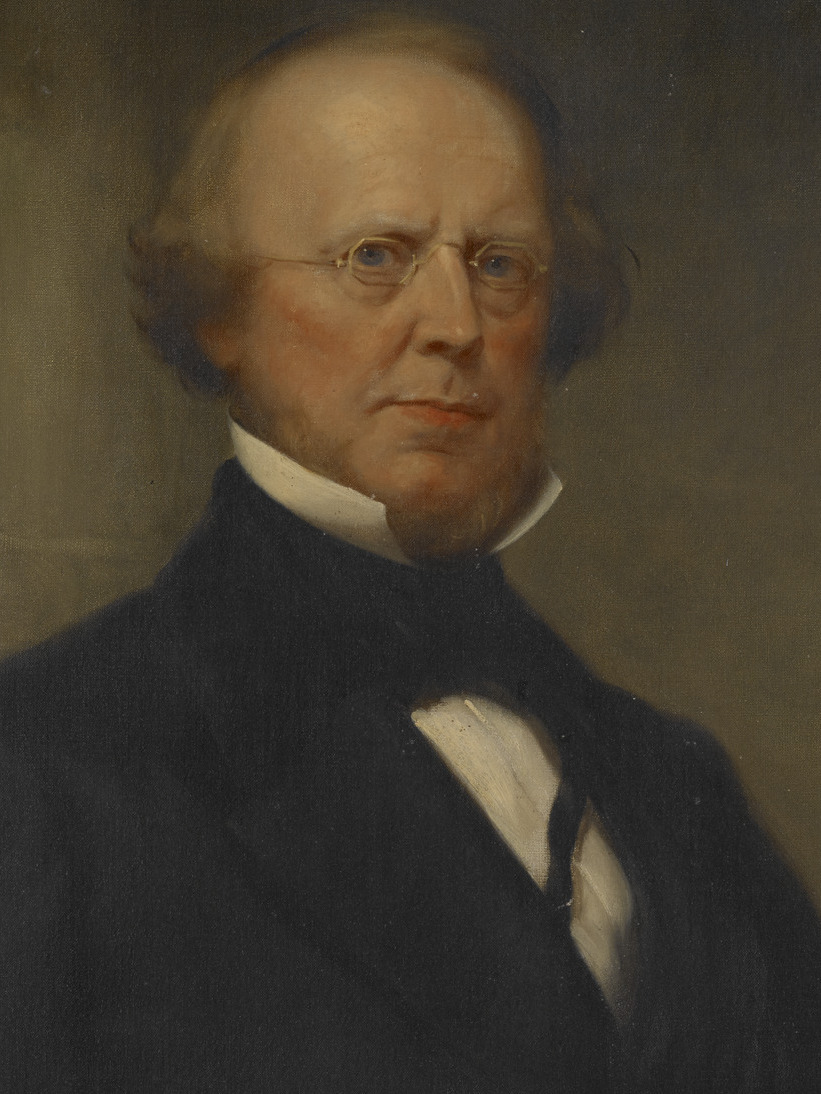

32nd Governor of Connecticut
- In office May 1, 1844 – May 6, 1846
- Lieutenant: Reuben Booth
- Preceded by: Chauncey Fitch Cleveland
- Succeeded by: Isaac Toucey

United States Senator from Connecticut
- In office November 11, 1847 – March 3, 1851
- Preceded by: Jabez W. Huntington
- Succeeded by: Isaac Toucey

Member of the Connecticut House of Representatives
- In office 1837-1838

Personal details
- Born: January 4, 1793 New Haven, Connecticut
- Died: February 19, 1863 (aged 70) New Haven, Connecticut
- Party: Whig; Republican
- Spouse: Emily Pitkin Perkins (m. 1820)
- Children: 9, incl. Simeon E. Baldwin
- Education: Yale College; Litchfield Law School

Roger Sherman Baldwin (January 4, 1793 – February 19, 1863) was an American politician who served as the 32nd governor of Connecticut from 1844 to 1846 and a United States senator from 1847 to 1851. As a lawyer, his career was most notable for his participation in the 1841 Amistad case.

== Early life ==
Baldwin was born in New Haven, Connecticut, the son of Simeon Baldwin and Rebecca Sherman. He was the maternal grandson of notable founding father Roger Sherman, the only person to sign all four great state papers of the U.S.: the Continental Association, the Declaration of Independence, the Articles of Confederation and the Constitution. Through his father he was descended from Robert Treat, Samuel Appleton and Simon Willard. Through his mother he was descended from Samuel Stone and William Blaxton. He attended Hopkins School, and entered Yale College at the age of fourteen, and graduated with high honors in 1811. At Yale, Baldwin was a member of the Linonian Society. After leaving Yale he studied law in his father's office in New Haven, and also in the Litchfield Law School, and was admitted to the bar in 1814. Although repeatedly called into public office, he devoted himself through life to the profession of his choice, attaining the highest distinction, especially in the discussion of questions of law. His defense in 1841, of the rights of the Africans of the Amistad, is particularly celebrated, both for his ability and for the importance of the case.

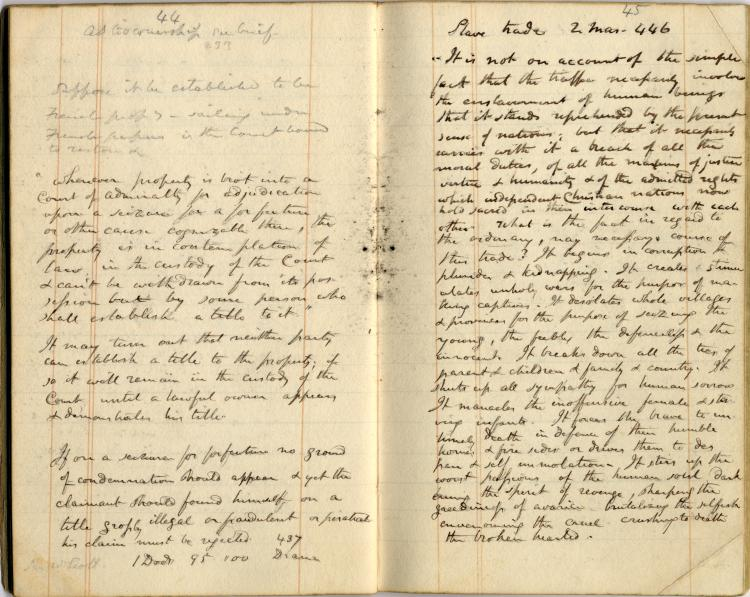
Roger Sherman Baldwin's notebooks relating to the Amistad case, 1840. Yale University Archives

== Political career ==
After having been a member of the city government in New Haven, in 1826 and 1828, Baldwin was elected in 1837 and again in 1838 as a member of the Connecticut State Senate. In 1840 and 1841 he represented the town of New Haven in the General Assembly. He was elected Governor of Connecticut in 1844 by the state legislature, and was re-elected in 1845. In 1844, Governor Roger Sherman Baldwin proposed legislation to end slavery, but the General Assembly did not pass it until it was reintroduced in 1848 as "An Act to Prevent Slavery". On the death of Senator Jabez W. Huntington in 1847, Baldwin was appointed by Governor Clark Bissell to fill the vacancy in the United States Senate, and in December of that year he took his seat as a member of that body. He was elected by the Legislature in the following May to the same position, which he held until 1851.

While in office he demanded an "independent tribunal" to protect the rights of free Black Americans and investigate the claims of those enforcing the Fugitive Slave Act. Some argued that Black Americans were not citizens and had no rights worth protecting. He reminded them that many states had allowed Black men of property to vote at the time of the nation's founding, a right that was only rescinded in the 1830s.

After that period he held no public office, except that he was one of the presidential electors in the canvass of 1860, and by appointment of Governor William Alfred Buckingham was a delegate to the Peace Convention which met in Washington, in 1861, by request of the State of Virginia. He was described as a devout Christian who studied the Bible every day.

Baldwin died in New Haven, February 19, 1863; at the age of 70 and was interred at Grove Street Cemetery. A biographical discourse was pronounced at his funeral by Rev. Dr. Dutton, which was printed in the New Englander for April 1863, and was also published as a pamphlet.

== Family ==
He was grandson of Roger Sherman, son of Simeon Baldwin, nephew of Ebenezer Baldwin, husband of Emily Pitkin Perkins, father of Connecticut Governor Simeon E. Baldwin, grandfather of New York Supreme Court Justice Edward Baldwin Whitney, and the great-grandfather of the famed Princeton University mathematics professor Hassler Whitney.

== In popular culture ==
A simplified version of the events regarding the Amistad case were made into a movie called Amistad in 1997 in which Matthew McConaughey portrayed Roger Sherman Baldwin. In Greenwich, Connecticut, there is a town park called Roger Sherman Baldwin Park.

Party political offices
Preceded by William W. Ellsworth	Whig nominee for Governor of Connecticut; 1843, 1844, 1845	Succeeded by Clark Bissell
Political offices
Preceded by Chauncey Fitch Cleveland	Governor of Connecticut; 1844–1846	Succeeded by Isaac Toucey
U.S. Senate
Preceded by Jabez W. Huntington	U.S. senator (Class 1) from Connecticut; 1847–1851; Served alongside: John M. Niles, Truman Smith	Succeeded by Isaac Toucey
