= William S. Holabird =

American politician

37th Lieutenant Governor of Connecticut
- In office May 4, 1842 – May 1, 1844
- Governor: Chauncey Fitch Cleveland
- Preceded by: Charles Hawley
- Succeeded by: Reuben Booth

United States Attorney for the District of Connecticut
- In office 1834–1841
- President: Andrew Jackson; Martin Van Buren
- Preceded by: Asa Child
- Succeeded by: Charles Chapman

Personal details
- Born: 1794 Canaan, Connecticut
- Died: May 20, 1855 (aged 60–61) Winchester, Litchfield County, Connecticut
- Party: Democratic Party

William S. Holabird (c. 1794 – May 20, 1855) was an American lawyer, politician and the 37th Lieutenant Governor of Connecticut.

== Early life ==
William S. Holabird was born circa 1794 reportedly at Canaan, Connecticut, the son of William D. Holabird and his wife, the former Dorcas Bird. He married Adeline/Adaline Catlin, daughter of Abijah and Orinda (Williams) Catlin.

== Career ==
In 1831 and 1833, he was unsuccessful as a Democratic candidate for Congress and was appointed by Andrew Jackson in 1834 as U.S. Attorney for the District of Connecticut. As such he presented the government's argument in the Amistad case.

Holabird was later elected the Lieutenant Governor of Connecticut for two consecutive terms, serving from May 4, 1842, to May 1, 1844, while Chauncey Fitch Cleveland was governor. Cleveland was succeeded as governor in 1844 by Roger S. Baldwin from the Whig party. Baldwin was known for his defence in the Amistad case, where Holabird had been the government's attorney.

William S. Holabird died at Winchester, Litchfield County, Connecticut, on May 20, 1855.

== In popular culture ==
A simplified version of the events regarding the Amistad case was made into a movie called Amistad in 1997 in which Pete Postlethwaite portrayed William S. Holabird.

== See also ==
- List of lieutenant governors of Connecticut

== Sources ==
- Brief Descriptions of Connecticut State Agencies, Lieutenant Governor

Political offices
Preceded by Charles Hawley	Lieutenant Governor of Connecticut; 1842–1844	Succeeded by Reuben Booth
