= Reuben Booth =

American politician and lawyer

Reuben Hull Booth (November 26, 1794 – August 14, 1848) was an American politician and lawyer and the 38th Lieutenant Governor of Connecticut from 1844 to 1846.

== Early life ==
Descended from the ancient Booth family of Cheshire, he was a kinsman of the Booth baronets. Born at Newtown, Connecticut, to Reuben Mills Booth and Anne Eunice née Northrop, when he was quite young, his family moved to Kent, Connecticut. His father was a man of considerable attainments in science, but in moderate circumstances. He needed the assistance of his son in his business of wool-carding to support the family. Reuben Booth was thus employed in this business until he was about seventeen years old, when, with his father's consent, he commenced preparatory studies of a collegiate course. In 1813, he entered the sophomore class at Yale College. The following year, he received notice of his father's death, which came by drowning. He hastened home and expected to abandon his studies, but friends in Kent loaned him the money required for him to complete his studies. He graduated in 1816.

Immediately after graduation, he commenced the study of law. A year into his law studies, he was also employed as an instructor in the academy in Danbury. He was admitted to the Bar in 1818 and opened an office to practice law in Danbury.

== Political career ==
In 1822, Booth was elected a representative of Danbury to the General Assembly of Connecticut. In the same year, he was appointed judge of probate for the district of Danbury, an office he remained in until 1835. In 1830, he was elected state Senator. In 1844 he was elected Lieutenant Governor of Connecticut, serving for two one-year terms while Roger Sherman Baldwin was Governor, from May 1, 1844, to May 6, 1846. His policy was always conservative.

Booth died at Danbury August 14, 1848, of the dysentery, after an illness of little more than two days. On Friday, August 11, he was engaged in a trial of a case before the court, which he argued with his usual ability, and his death occurred on the following Monday. He was a member of the Episcopalian Church during the latter part of his life, and was buried in the burying-ground of the Episcopalians in Danbury with his wife, Jane née Belden (died 1844).

== See also ==
- Booth baronets

== Sources ==
- Memorials of Connecticut Judges and Attorneys, Reuben Booth (As Printed in the Connecticut Reports volume 19, pages 158–159)

Political offices
| Preceded by William S. Holabird | Lieutenant Governor of Connecticut; 1844-1846 | Succeeded by Noyes Billings |
