= Amos Eno House =

Historic house in Connecticut, United States

- U.S. National Register of Historic Places
- U.S. Historic district – Contributing property
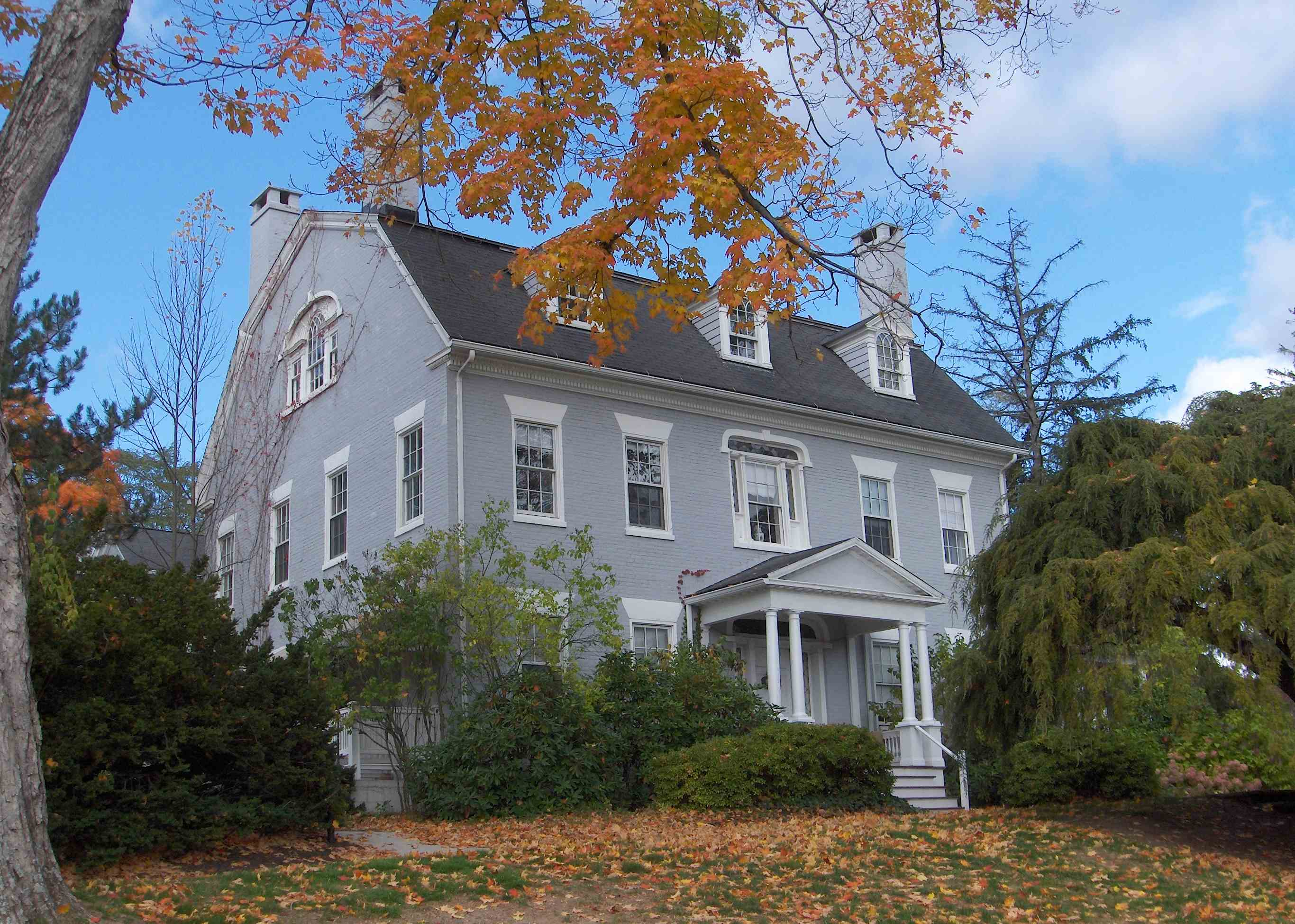
- Location: 731 Hopmeadow Street, Simsbury, Connecticut
- Coordinates: 41.8737°N 72.8028°W
- Area: 10 acres (4.0 ha)
- Built: 1820
- Part of: Simsbury Center Historic District (ID96000356)
- NRHP reference No.: 75001935

Significant dates
- Added to NRHP: April 3, 1975
- Designated CP: April 12, 1996

The Amos Eno House, also known as the Simsbury 1820 House, is a historic home at 731 Hopmeadow Street in Simsbury, Connecticut.

== Prior to Amos Eno ==
The house was built in 1822 by Elisha Phelps, who was given the land by his father, Noah. Noah Phelps was a graduate of Yale University, a lawyer and a judge.

The first floor contains a center hallway with a kitchen, breakfast nook and parlor. The second floor also has a center hall and two rooms on each side. The house is decorated throughout with detailed woodwork and glass that show the wealth of the original occupants.

Elisha and his wife had three children: Mary, John, and Lucy. John grew up to be the Governor of Missouri and became a United States Senator. Mary married John Allen, and their son became a representative to the United States Congress.

== Amos Eno summer residence ==
Lucy married Amos Richards Eno of Simsbury. They moved to New York City where he and a cousin opened a profitable dry goods business. Amos parlayed his profits into real estate investment in Manhattan, New York. In 1856–59 he built the famous Fifth Avenue Hotel at the corner of Fifth Avenue and 23rd Street in Manhattan. It was here that he and relatives established the Second National Bank of New York. The Eno family would visit the house in Simsbury every summer.

One of their grandchildren was Gifford Pinchot, conservationist and Governor of Pennsylvania, who was born in the house.

In 1884 scandal hit the family when one of Amos' sons, John Chester, embezzled millions of dollars from his father's bank and then fled to Canada to avoid prosecution. After settling his son's debts, Amos retreated to the family summer residence. He built additions onto it in order to accommodate visits from his large family, including numerous bedrooms and a new wing. When the expansion was complete, the house had over thirty rooms.

Amos' daughter Antoinette Eno Wood who aided her disgraced brother lived in the house caring for her father. After his death she refused to leave the home and paid her brother, Amos a life tenancy to remain there. She refurbished the home and renamed it Eaglewood, a nod to her last name and to the family's patriotism. She also carried out a series of renovations on it, including landscaping by the Frederick Olmsted firm, who designed Central Park in New York. The home became a very important fixture in Simsbury's social atmosphere in the summers. It overflowed with guests to the point that the house would be filled and the guest house would have to be used. She also hosted ice cream socials on the Fourth of July. She also hosted a meeting of the Connecticut Woman's Suffrage League in the home. Present at this meeting was Katharine Houghton Hepburn, mother of actress Katharine Hepburn.

== After the Eno Family ==
Upon her death, the house was passed through her brother Amos Frederick's will to his minor nephew, who eventually sold it. It became a restaurant, then was sold to a developer, who built a community on the property. The town of Simsbury purchased the house in 1960 but did little to maintain it except to paint it in 1976 for the bicentennial. Finally, in 1985, extensive restoration was done to the inside and out.

== Current use ==
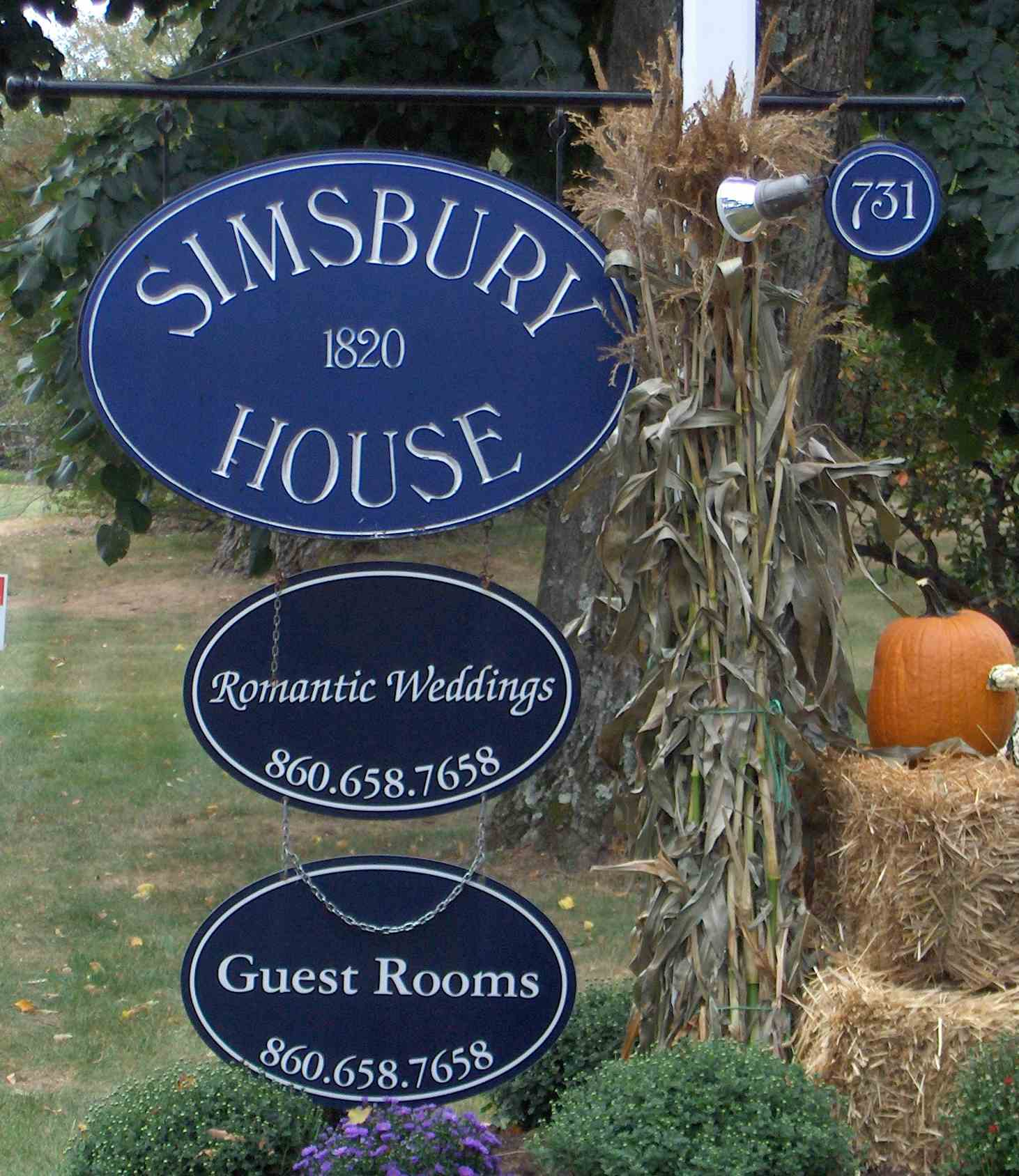
Sign in front of Amos Eno House

The house is now an inn, cafe and reception hall that hosts wedding parties up to 120 people.

== Eno Family legacy ==
The Eno family made many contributions to the town of Simsbury, including:

- The Simsbury Free Library was started with money from a trust by Amos Eno
- Eno Memorial Hall was built with money given by Antoinette Eno Wood as a memorial to her parents. It used to serve as the town hall; now it is home to the Social Services Department, the local chapter of the Daughters of the American Revolution, Simsbury Community Television and the Simsbury Senior Center.
- The Capt. Elisha Phelps House was owned by Elisha Phelps, brother of Noah Phelps. It served as a tavern and museum from 1786 to 1849. It is now the Phelps Tavern Museum.
- The Town Farm Dairy of Simsbury was donated by Amos R. Eno to be used as a poor farm for citizens in need. The farm originally produced vegetables, dairy, chickens and tobacco. Currently, it is a dairy farm, and the residence is used for affordable housing.

== See also ==
- National Register of Historic Places listings in Hartford County, Connecticut
