= Henry Lane Eno =

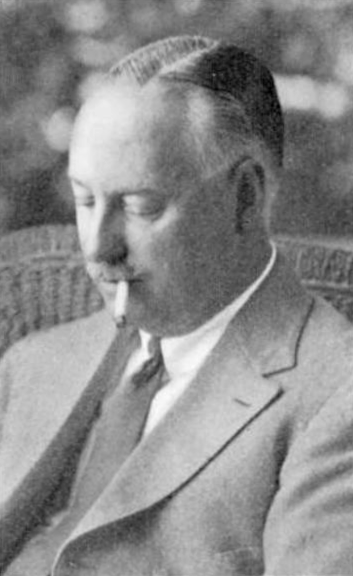
- Eno, c. 1922
- Born: July 8, 1871; New York, New York, U.S.
- Died: September 10, 1928 (aged 57); Montacute, South Somerset, England
- Education: Yale College; Columbia Law School
- Occupations: Psychologist, writer
- Spouses: Edith Marie Labouisse (m. 1898; died 1922) Flora Napier (m. 1923)

Henry Lane Eno (1871–1928) was an American psychologist and writer.

== Biography ==
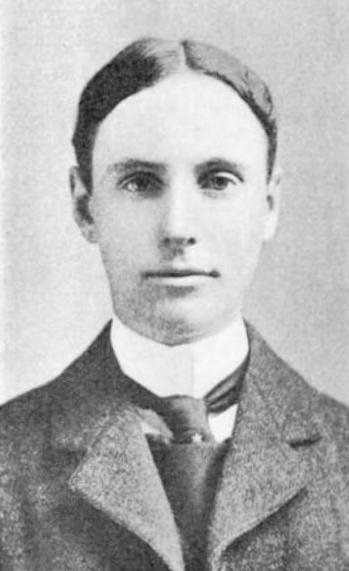
Eno as a Yale undergraduate

Henry Lane Eno was born in New York City on July 8, 1871. A member of the Eno real estate and banking family, (Note: The family descends from James Enno (1625–1682) of Windsor, Connecticut.) he was the son of Henry Clay Eno and his wife Cornelia, the daughter of George W. Lane of New York.

Eno, a member of the circle of Mary Seney Sheldon, built the Fifth Avenue Building on the site of his grandfather's Fifth Avenue Hotel facing Madison Square; an unpaid researcher at Princeton University with the courtesy title of "Professor", he was better known as a psychologist, author and poet.

Having graduated from Yale College in 1894, and gaining an L.L.B. from Columbia (though he never practiced), in 1898 he married his first wife Edith Marie Labouisse. On the death of his father in 1914, Eno inherited a fortune estimated at over $15,000,000; this was considerably increased when in 1919, he successfully contested the $10 million will of his unmarried uncle, Amos F. Eno, a son of the builder and owner of the Fifth Avenue Hotel, for decades New York's grandest and most fashionable, the engine of the Eno fortune, founded in textile merchandising; Amos Eno was a founder of the Second National Bank of New York. The nephew claimed he needed the money for the education of his children, Amos and Alice. (Note: Eno's daughter, Alice Labouisse Eno (born August 19, 1903), married Henry Hopkinson, 1st Baron Colyton, in 1927. She died on April 30, 1953.)

Eno was the principal donor of Princeton's Eno Hall. Completed in 1924, it was described at the time as "The first laboratory in this country, if not in the world, dedicated solely to the teaching and investigation of scientific psychology."

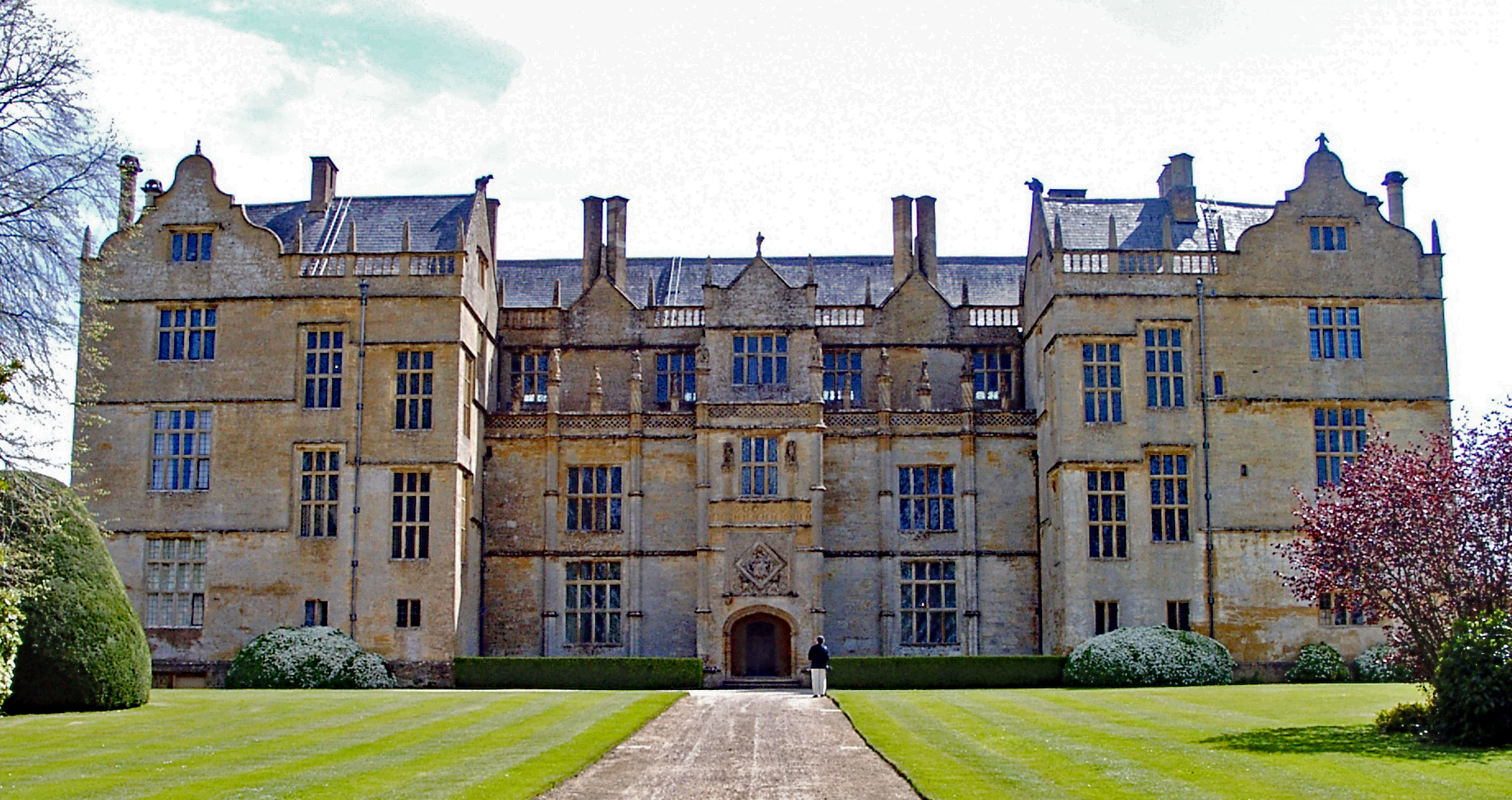
Montacute House, Somerset. Eno spent his final years at Montacute, living the life of an English country gentleman.

Eno's wife died in February 1922 at Princeton; in September 1923, he remarried in England, and settled there with his much younger English wife, Flora Napier. (Note: Flora, the daughter of Cmdr. Gerald Talbot Napier, later remarried. Her second husband was the Hon. Ernest Freeman-Mitford, the son of the 1st Baron Redesdale. Thus, Flora became an aunt of the Mitford sisters. She died in 1981.) The couple rented one of England's finest Elizabethan mansions, Montacute House in Somerset. His daughter, Juliet (later Princess Alexei Melikoff) was born there in 1925. Eno's widow Flora married, on August 1, 1931, (Ernest) Rupert Bertram Ogilvy Freeman-Mitford, son of Bertram Freeman-Mitford, 1st Baron Redesdale, and became the mother of the 5th Baron Redesdale. She died on December 20, 1981.

Eno died at Montacute House on September 10, 1928.

== Works ==
- Activism, an essay in philosophy (1920)
- The Baglioni, a verse play in five acts (1905)
- The Seacoast National Park in Maine (1916)
- The Wanderer, an extended poem (1921)

== See also ==
- Amos Eno House
