= John Jay Phelps =

American Financier

- Judge John Jay Phelps, railroad baron, publisher, judge, and merchant
- Born: October 25, 1810; Simsbury, Connecticut, US
- Died: May 12, 1869 (aged 58); Simsbury, Connecticut, US
- Occupations: Publisher, judge, and merchant
- Known for: Founder and first President of the Delaware, Lackawanna and Western Railroad
- Children: 3, including William Walter Phelps

John Jay Phelps (October 25, 1810 – May 12, 1869) was an early railroad baron and financier, who was one of the founders of the Delaware, Lackawanna and Western Railroad and served as its first president. He was also a publisher, judge, and merchant.

== Biography ==
Coat of Arms of John Jay Phelps

Phelps left his father Alexander Phelps' house at the age of 13 years. In partnership with George D. Prentice (afterward of the Louisville Journal), he owned and edited (before his majority) the New England Weekly Review, published at Hartford. In 1827 he began the manufacture of glass in Dundaff, Pennsylvania, and became acquainted with the coal fields of the Lackawanna Valley, in which he was afterwards so closely and profitably connected.

Later he became connected with his cousin, Amos R. Eno, as large wholesale merchants in New York City, under the firm name of Eno & Phelps, which firm was continued for ten years, when they dissolved. He continued in the mercantile business, and operated largely in real estate, with great boldness and success.

Before he was 40 years old he had built a splendid block on the site of old Grace Church, and another on the site of the Park Theatre. All these operations were entered into by his old partner, Amos Eno, who finished by building the Fifth Avenue Hotel. As a director of the Erie Railroad he received the thanks of the city council by a joint resolution of both branches, and was for a long time prominently identified with the Delaware, Lackawanna and Western Railroad Co. He was president, resigning in 1853, but remaining in the board until 1863.

He was one of the first to use freestone in the architecture of New York City. He was long connected with the direction of the Mercantile, Second National and City Banks, the Camden and Amboy Railroad Co., the Manhattan Gas Light Co., and Bleecker Street Savings Institute, also with many other public and private trusts, which show the high esteem in which he was held by his fellow citizens, while his will contained bequests to many educational and charitable institutions. He died in New York City, May 12, 1869, and was buried in Simsbury, Connecticut.

== Family ==
Phelps married Rachel Badgeley Phinney on January 29, 1835, at Dundaff, Pennsylvania. They had three children:

- Ellen A. Phelps (March 28, 1838 – 1880)
- William Walter Phelps (August 24, 1839 – June 17, 1894)
- Francis Alexander Phelps (April 1, 1841 – April 5, 1848)

== Sources ==
- Excerpted from: Phelps, Judge Oliver Seymour; Servin, Andrew T. (1899). The Phelps Family of America and their English Ancestors. Vol. 1. Pittsfield, Massachusetts: Eagle Publishing Company. p. 608.
