= Amos Eno =

American real estate investor and capitalist

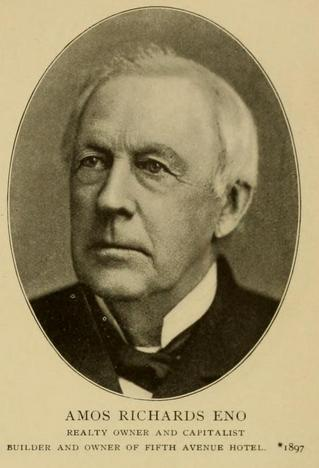
- Amos Eno
- Born: November 1, 1810; Simsbury, Connecticut
- Died: February 21, 1898 (aged 87)
- Spouse: Lucy Jane Phelps

Amos Richards Eno (November 1, 1810 – February 21, 1898) was an American real estate investor and capitalist in New York City. He built the Fifth Avenue Hotel and many other developments on the streets of Broadway and Fifth Avenue, where he established a prominent family fortune of 20 to 40 million U.S. dollars.

== Early life ==
Eno was born November 1, 1810, in Simsbury, Connecticut.

== Career ==
Eno began his career as a merchant of dry goods who expanded into real estate in New York City having built the Fifth Avenue Hotel in New York City and much valuable real estate in New York City where he established a sizable fortune. Having clerked in a small general store in Hartford, Connecticut, he married Lucy Phelps, also of Simsbury, and moved to New York, where he and his cousin John Jay Phelps opened a profitable dry goods business. While making a fortune in the dry goods business, Amos Eno parlayed his profits into real estate investment in Manhattan, New York, buying corner lots and occasionally full undeveloped city blocks.

His brownstone-fronted store at 74 Broadway had the reputation of having been the first use of brownstone in the city. Retiring from active participation as a merchant, he concentrated in 1856–59 in building the famous Fifth Avenue Hotel at the corner of Fifth Avenue and 23rd Street in Madison Square, Manhattan, and the adjacent Madison Square Theatre in 1863.

North of Madison Square, Eno built a brick four story house at 233 Fifth Avenue, between 26th and 27th Streets, that served as his residence for many years. In April 1890, Eno sold it to The Reform Club for $240,000 (equivalent to $8,600,000 in 2025). Anson Phelps Stokes was in 1888 its founding president. Before moving into Eno's mansion, the club had been located at 12 East 33rd Street. The structure at 233 Fifth Avenue, still much in its original form, currently is the home of the Museum of Sex.

Eno and relatives, in April 1882, chartered the Second National Bank of New York, headquartered in the hotel. In 1884 scandal hit the family bank when one of Amos' sons, John Chester Eno, president of the bank, embezzled millions of dollars and then fled to Canada to avoid prosecution. Eno never closed the bank, though three to four million dollars were withdrawn in panic, and made good his son's embezzlement, "though he never recovered from the shock". He held the greater part of a full block facing Broadway in Longacre Square (now Times Square). His last real estate speculations were in open lots on the Upper West Side.

== Retirement ==
After settling his son's debts, Amos retreated to the family summer residence in Simsbury, the Amos Eno House (1820, on the National Register of Historic Places) which had been erected by Eno's father-in-law, Elisha Phelps. Every summer the Eno family would visit the house, which was enlarged by Eno and by his daughter Antoinette Eno Wood. He was a founding benefactor of the Simsbury Free Library, among other local philanthropic gestures.

Eno's portrait by Eastman Johnson, commissioned by his family in 1899, was made posthumously based on photographs. It is conserved in the New York State Museum.

== Personal life ==
Amos Richards Eno – on January 14, 1835, in Simsbury, Connecticut – married Lucy Jane Phelps (maiden; 1818–1882), daughter of Elisha Phelps (1779–1847). Their children included:

1. Amos F. Eno (1836–1915); never married and left his entire estate to Columbia University
2. Mary Jane Eno (1838–1914); married to James Wallace Pinchot (1831–1908); whose children included:
  1. Gifford Pinchot (1865–1946);
  2. Amos Pinchot (1873–1944), an American reformist, a mainstay and the historian of the Progressive Party, 1912–1916; he married, in 1900, Gertrude Minturn (1872–1939), daughter of shipping magnate, Robert Bowne Minturn Jr. (1836–1889); Amos Pinchot divorced Gertrude in 1918; their daughter, Rosamond Pinchot (1904–1938), an actress, shocked the world when she committed suicide; Rosamond had been married to William Alexander "Big Bill" Gaston (1896–1970), a grandson of William Gaston (1820–1894), the 29th Governor of Massachusetts;
  3. Antoinette Eno Pinchot (1869–1934); married to Alan Johnstone GCVO (1858–1932); whose son was:
    1. Harcourt Johnstone (1895–1945)
3. William Phelps Eno (1858–1945), the father of road safety in America;
4. Henry Clay Eno (1840–1914), father of Henry Lane Eno (1871–1928);
5. John Chester Eno (1848–1914), who, in 1879, got caught in a scandal by embezzling about 4 million US dollars from the Second National Bank of New York, of which he was president, causing a run on the bank, all of which was covered by his father, Amos, Isaac Noah Phelps, and William Walter Phelps; and
6. Antoinette Eno (1842–1930); married to Charles Boughton Wood (1822–1889)

== Death ==
Amos R. Eno died February 21, 1898. At time of his death his wealth was evaluated from 20 to 40 million dollars.
