= Spring Morning in the Heart of the City =

Painting by Childe Hassam

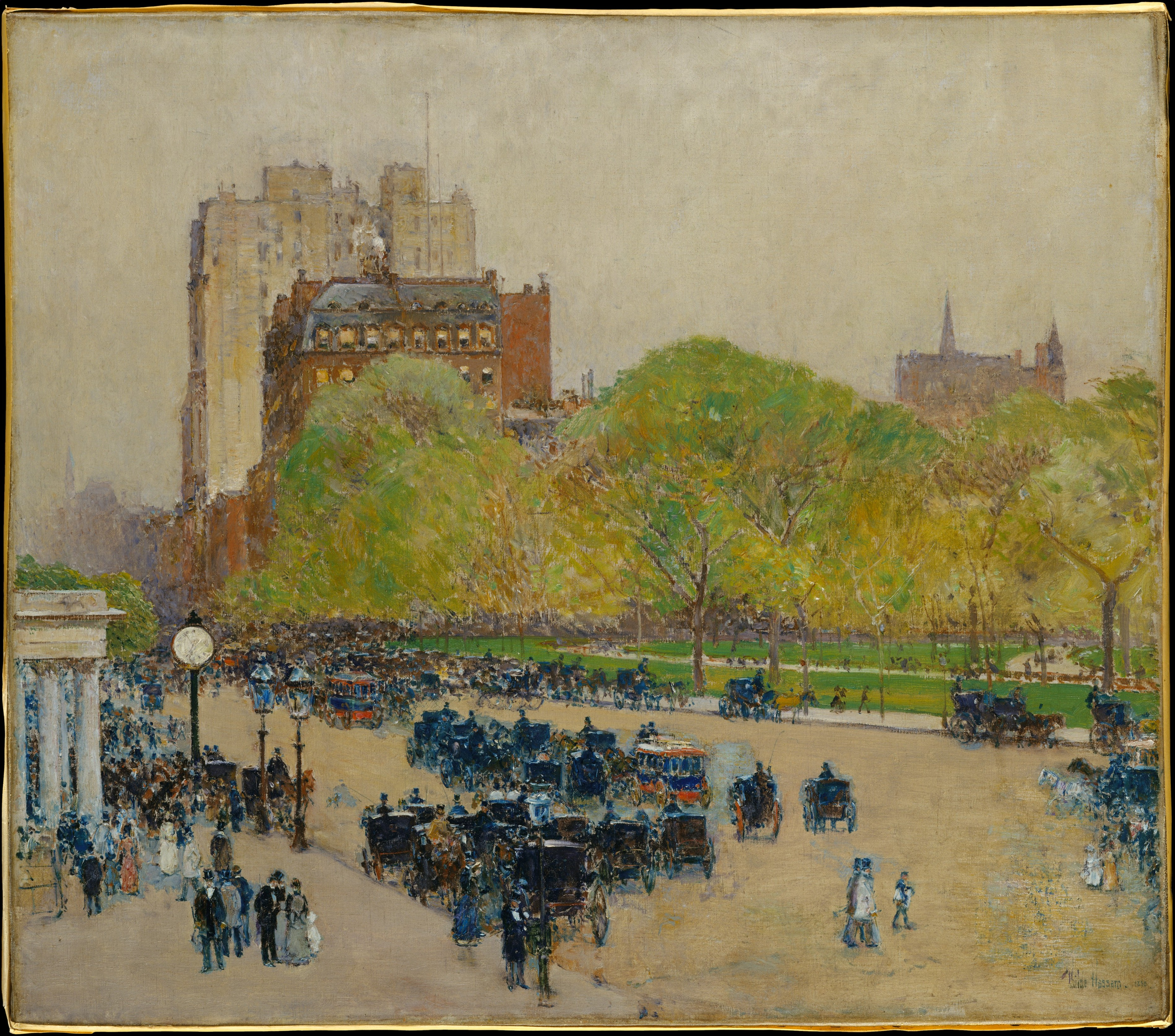
- Artist: Childe Hassam
- Year: 1890
- Medium: Oil on canvas
- Dimensions: 46 cm × 52.7 cm (18 in × 20.7 in)
- Location: Metropolitan Museum of Art; New York
- Accession: 43.116.1

Spring Morning in the Heart of the City is an 1890 oil-on-canvas painting by the American Impressionist artist Childe Hassam which is in the collection of the Metropolitan Museum of Art in New York city.

The painting depicts Fifth Avenue in New York City, specifically the busy area west of Madison Square Park between Fifth and Madison Avenues just north of 23rd Street. The entrance to the Fifth Avenue Hotel can be seen at the left, denoted by the classical portico and large circular clock.

The work is on view in the Metropolitan Museum's Gallery 774.
