= Seth Preston Beers =

American judge

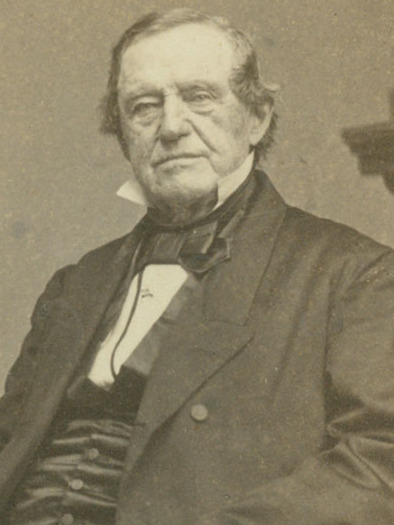

Member of the Connecticut State Senate
- In office 1824

3rd Speaker of the Connecticut House of Representatives
- In office 1822–1823
- Preceded by: Elisha Phelps
- Succeeded by: Ralph I. Ingersoll

Clerk of the Connecticut House of Representatives
- In office 1821

Member of the Connecticut House of Representatives
- In office 1820–1823

Personal details
- Born: July 1, 1781 Woodbury, Connecticut
- Died: September 9, 1863 (aged 82) Litchfield, Connecticut
- Party: Toleration (1820–1824); Democratic (1838)
- Spouse: Belinda Webster
- Profession: Lawyer, politician

Seth Preston Beers (July 1, 1781 – September 9, 1863), sometimes listed as Seth P. Beers, was a lawyer and politician from Litchfield, Connecticut.

He attended Litchfield Law School, and was admitted to the bar in 1805. From 1820 to 1825, he served as the state's attorney.

He served in the Connecticut State House of Representatives from 1820 to 1823, serving as clerk in 1821, and was elected speaker in 1822 and 1823, as a Toleration Republican. He also briefly served in the Connecticut State Senate in 1824. He was the Democratic nominee for governor in 1838, and lost to incumbent governor William W. Ellsworth.

Party political offices
Preceded by Henry W. Edwards	Democratic nominee for Governor of Connecticut; 1838	Succeeded by John M. Niles
Political offices
Preceded by Elisha Phelps	Speaker of the Connecticut House of Representatives; 1822, 1823	Succeeded by Ralph I. Ingersoll
