= Taylor Map of New York =

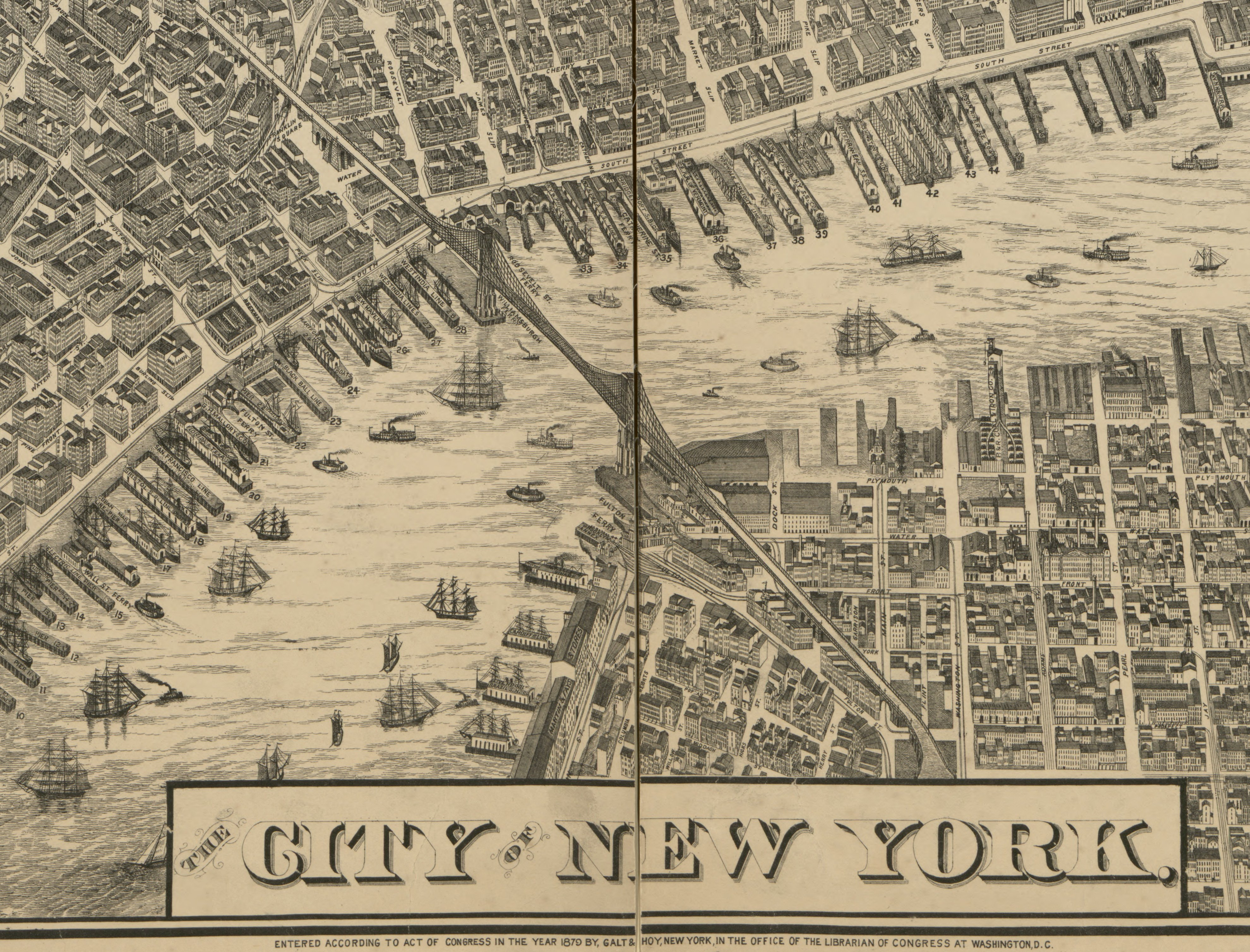
Inset of the title and the Brooklyn bridge

The Taylor Map is an engraved map of New York City, produced by Will L. Taylor for Galt & Hoy in 1879. The map depicts the entire length of the island of Manhattan, although not to scale, and is surrounded by period advertisements and portraits of various businesses in New York and New Jersey. Original prints sold for $10 "on spring rollers", or $12.50 "in black walnut or gilt case with handsome cornice". The original map was 188 by 107 centimetres (74 in × 42 in), printed on four 97 by 55 centimetres (38 in × 22 in) sheets. The Taylor Map was one of the first true attempts to label all roads and piers and to depict buildings using a vanishing perspective.

== Locations ==
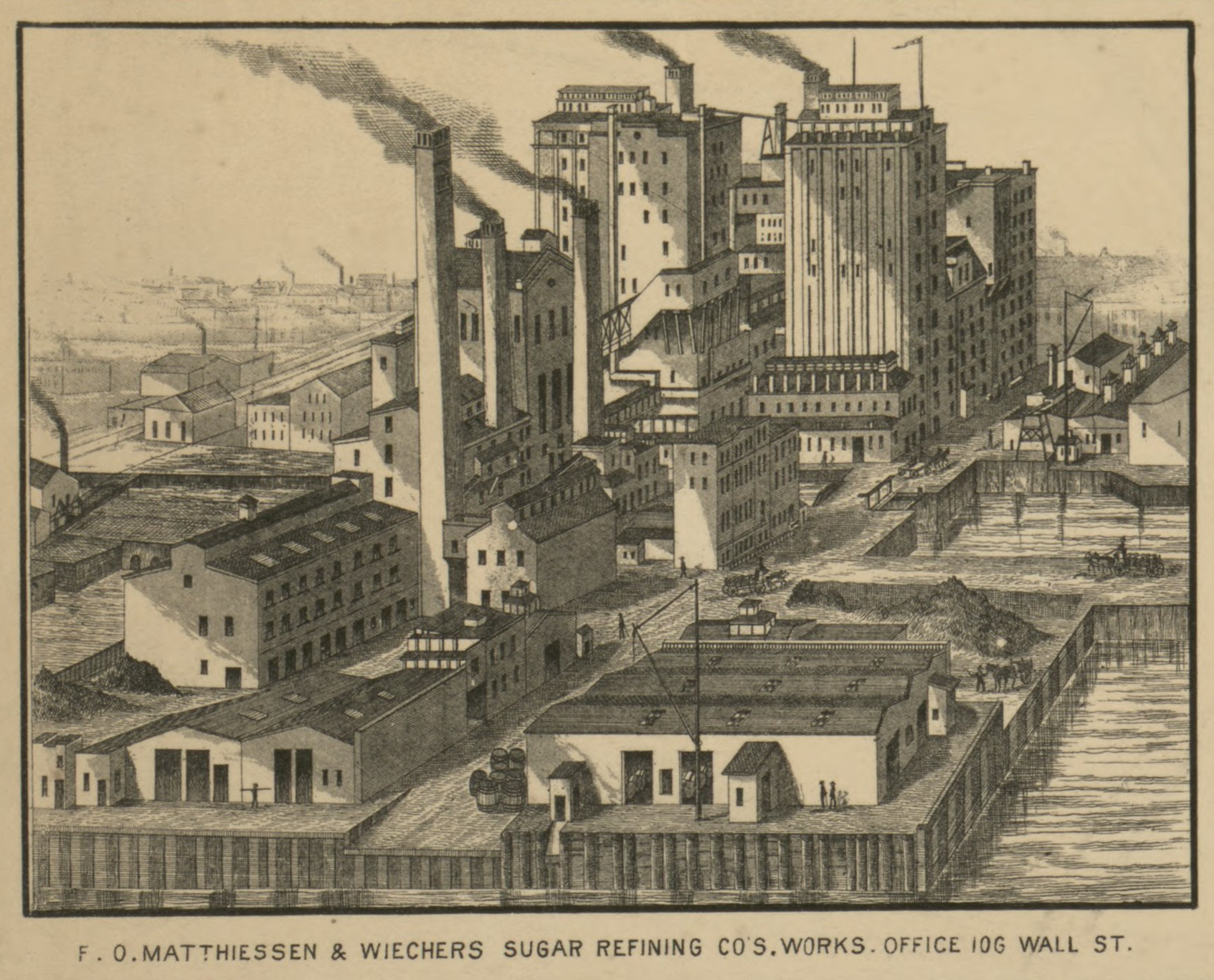
The F.O. Matthiessen & Wiechers Sugar refining Works

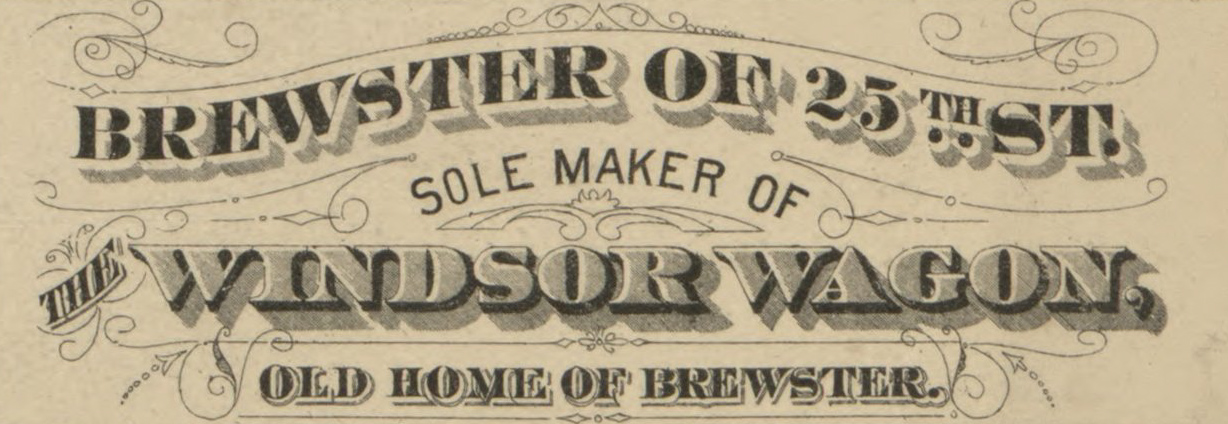
The Brewsters of 25th Street

At the bottom of the map is the Brooklyn Bridge, although the bridge was not yet completed at the time of the map's publication. Included in the locations depicted are factories, such as the Matthiessen and Wiechers Sugar Refining Works shown on the right, businesses such as the Fifth Avenue Hotel and Brown & Pray Carriage Builders, and locations such as Manhattan Beach.

== Ads ==
The map is bordered by advertisements for "The Brewsters of 25th Street", "Dixon Crucible Co.", the "European Salicyclic Medicine Co", "E. Aug. Neresheimer, Importer of Diamonds", "Robert T Hoy - Banker & Broker" and "WM. Rogers, with Simpson, Hall, Miller & Co, manufacturers of the finest quality of silver electro plated ware".

== Map ==
Scan of the 1879 map

== See also ==
- Cartography of New York City
