= 1838 Connecticut gubernatorial election =

- April 2, 1838
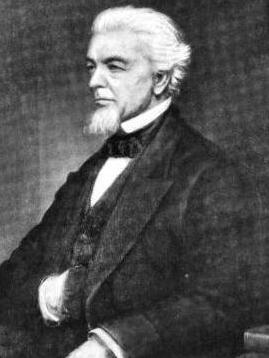

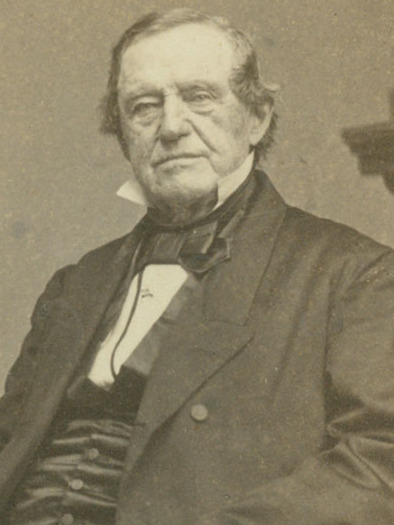
Nominee	William W. Ellsworth	Seth P. Beers
Party	Whig	Democratic
Popular vote	27,115	21,489
Percentage	54.14%	42.90%
- Ellsworth: 40–50% 50–60% 60–70% 70–80% 80–90% Beers: 40–50% 50–60% 60–70% 70–80% Tie: 40–50% No Data/Vote
Governor before election
Henry W. Edwards
Democratic
Elected Governor
William W. Ellsworth
Whig

The 1838 Connecticut gubernatorial election was held on April 2, 1838. Former congressman and Whig nominee William W. Ellsworth was elected, defeating former speaker of the Connecticut House of Representatives and Democratic nominee Seth Preston Beers with 54.14% of the vote.

== General election ==
=== Candidates ===
Major party candidates

- William W. Ellsworth, Whig
- Seth P. Beers, Democratic

Minor party candidates

- Elisha Phelps, Conservative

=== Results ===
1838 Connecticut gubernatorial election
Party	Candidate	Votes	%	±%
Whig	William W. Ellsworth	27,115	54.14%	
Democratic	Seth P. Beers	21,489	42.90%	
Conservative	Elisha Phelps	1,483	2.96%	
Majority		5,626		
Turnout				
Whig gain from Democratic		Swing		
