= Conservative Party (United States) =

Parties that support conservatism in US

In the United States, the Conservative Party refers to a collection of state-level parties or groups that operate independently and advocate for conservative principles. Currently, there is no nationally recognized Conservative Party though there is Conservative Party USA which has several state chapters and has trademarked the name Conservative Party. Historically, many of these parties emerged from divisions within the Democratic and Republican parties, supporting a variety of conservative ideologies, including fiscal conservatism, social conservatism, states' rights, and nationalism.

Although there has not been a national Conservative Party, the Republican Party currently follows the conservative ideology, with third parties Constitution Party and American Independent Party following the Paleoconservatism ideology. In the late 1960s, the American Independent Party was rebranded as the American Conservative Party in some states. A separate American Conservative Party was later established in 2008 but was decommissioned in 2016. Meanwhile, the Conservative Party USA was organized on January 6, 2009, as a 527 organization aimed at building and managing state party affiliates under the national Conservative Party USA banner.

== 19th century ==
=== Connecticut ===
In the 1838 and 1839 Connecticut gubernatorial elections, Elisha Phelps, a former Speaker of the Connecticut House of Representatives, ran as the Conservative Party candidate. He received 2.96% of the popular vote in 1838 and 2.09% in 1839. In the 1842, Luther Loomis ran as the Conservative Party candidate, garnering 1.20% of the popular vote.

=== Virginia ===
In the late 19th century, a new Conservative Party of Virginia formed to oppose Reconstruction, uniting former Democrats, Whigs, and moderate Republicans. Led by Alexander H. H. Stuart and Raleigh T. Daniel, the party won majorities in the Virginia General Assembly in 1869. Though divided on black suffrage, the party supported economic reforms and established a segregated public school system. However, internal divisions over state debt repayment led to the formation of the Readjuster Party, which ultimately defeated the Conservatives. By 1883, most members of the Conservative Party merged with the Democratic Party.

In the Reconstruction era after the Civil War, former Whigs in several Southern states formed parties with the "Conservative" or "Democratic-Conservative" name. Eventually they all merged into the Democratic Party.

=== South Carolina ===
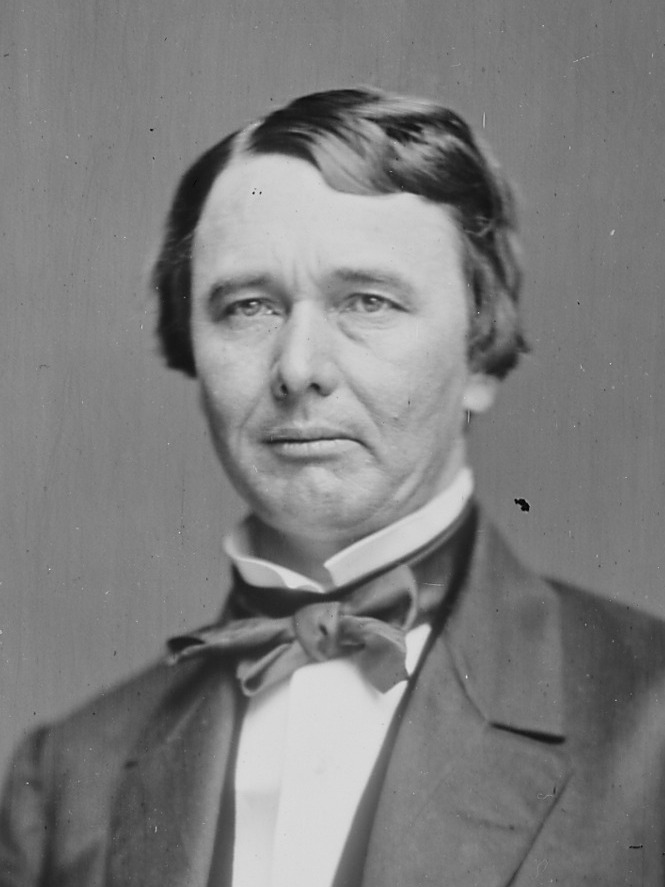
James Chesnut Jr. established the Conservative Party of South Carolina in 1874.

In 1874, the Conservative Party of South Carolina was established by James Chesnut Jr. to mobilize white voters, as the South Carolina Democratic Party was inactive statewide. A convention of the State Tax Union was convened in Columbia on September 10 to prepare for the upcoming election and address President Ulysses S. Grant's comments on the Ku Klux Klan. Another convention on October 8 endorsed the Independent Republican ticket with a platform focused on honesty in government.

Although the Independent Republican candidates were defeated in the general election, the Conservatives reduced Republican majorities in the legislature and saw some local success through collaboration with Independent Republicans. This cooperation enabled the election of Edmund W. M. Mackey to Congress from for the 2nd district. Despite these limited gains, the failure of the Conservative Party in 1874 pushed the Democrats to reorganize, leading to their resurgence in the 1876 elections, which ultimately marked the end of the Conservative Party in South Carolina.

=== North Carolina ===
After the collapse of the Whigs and then of the Know-Nothings, and the disruptions to politics caused by the start of the Civil War, some former Whigs and some former Unionist Democrats in North Carolina formed a loose coalition called the Conservative Party. The name continued to be used after the war for a coalition of those who opposed the Reconstruction policies of the Republican-led U.S. Congress. In 1876, the party re-branded itself as the Democratic Party. Both during the Civil War and afterwards, the leading public figure in the Conservative Party was Governor Zebulon B. Vance.

== 20th–21st centuries ==
=== Delaware ===
In 2009, a Conservative Party of Delaware had a website with a mailing address in Baton Rouge, Louisiana. It was affiliated with the Conservative Party USA and had no formal leadership. In 2024, the party achieved official recognition after Delaware residents registered as Conservative and met the state’s qualification threshold. Libertarian activist Will McVay, formerly of the Libertarian Party of Delaware, took the opportunity to reorganize the party. In the same year, the party nominated perennial candidate Vermin Supreme and comedian Jonathan Realz for President and Vice President of the United States, while endorsing Jon Roe for the 2024 Delaware Senate election.

=== Illinois ===
In 2018, Illinois State Senator Sam McCann left the Republican Party to establish the Conservative Party of Illinois for his gubernatorial campaign. Positioning himself as an "independent conservative," he explained that his candidacy aimed to prevent "two billionaires from Chicago" (Bruce Rauner and J. B. Pritzker) from dominating the general election. McCann secured his spot on the ballot by gathering 65,000 signatures but ultimately finished third in the general election, receiving 4.23% of the popular vote.

=== Michigan ===
The Michigan Conservative Party was a short-lived splinter group, broken off from the Michigan Republican Party. In the primary election on August 4, 1970, State Sen. Robert J. Huber narrowly lost the Republican nomination for U.S. Senate to Lenore Romney. In response, Huber began work to establish the Conservative Party. On August 27, Huber announced he filed the papers to found the party after having met with around 60 other dissidents in New Buffalo. He served as chairman of the party. In November 1971, Huber announced the Conservative Party would run a candidate to compete against Republican U.S. Senator Robert P. Griffin in the 1972 Senate election. Huber explained that Griffin was being targeted by the Conservative Party due to his inconsistency on the issue of integrated busing. Huber and the Conservative Party opposed integrated busing, and wanted a candidate who was more thoroughly antibusing.

The 1972 Conservative Party convention near unanimously adopted a resolution to urge Huber to run for the U.S. Senate with the party. The only dissenting vote was from Huber himself, who hadn't decided conclusively on whether to run a third party campaign. Huber ultimately decided to run for the U.S. House as a Republican, in Michigan's 18th congressional district. Huber wanted to run as both a Conservative and a Republican, but was barred from running with two parties by state law. The Conservative Party would later endorse Griffin's 1972 re-election campaign for Senate. Huber said Griffin was a leader in the antibusing cause. The Conservative Party's platform included antibusing, as well as opposition to tax increases, criminal appeasement, and welfare abuse. The party endorsed George Wallace for president. The Conservative Party failed to get enough signatures to gain ballot access in 1972. In November, Huber was elected to the U.S. House with a campaign focused on opposition to integrated busing.

At the 1973 Conservative Party convention, the party adopted a platform calling for a return to the gold standard, an end to deficit government spending, and the abolition of the minimum wage. They also supported the reinstatement of the death penalty, and opposed amnesty for draft dodgers and trade with communist nations, unless paid in gold. In 1973, the party supported a referendum to repeal an increased gasoline tax in Michigan, after an antibusing clause of the mass transit bill that created the tax was struck down in court. In 1974, the Conservative Party had ballot access. Chairman Eldon K. "Andy" Andrews, a real estate broker and realtor, served as the party's gubernatorial candidate. Andrews won 4,117 votes, 0.15% of the total. In the 1974 U.S. House election, Huber, running as a Republican, was defeated in his attempt at re-election by Democrat James J. Blanchard.

In February 1975, Huber said he had no interest in reviving the Conservative Party. The party held a convention in April 1975. Huber was in attendance. At the convention, the Conservative Party adopted a pledge to become a national party. In 1981, Huber was described by Mary Wade of the Kalamazoo Gazette to "move back and forth" between the Conservative Party and the Republican Party.

=== New Jersey ===
In 1963, several candidates ran as Conservatives for the New Jersey Assembly in Essex and Bergen counties, reflecting a nationwide split within the Republican Party. This divide saw northeastern states, including New Jersey, dominated by the party's liberal faction. These Conservative candidates opposed the social liberal policies of the Dwight D. Eisenhower administration, advocating instead for the emerging socially conservative views championed by U.S. Senator Barry Goldwater. The split subsided after Goldwater secured the Republican nomination during the 1964 National Convention.

In 1992, a separate New Jersey Conservative Party was founded by Tom Blomquist, who had previously run in the 1989 gubernatorial election. Blomquist ran as a Conservative in the 1993 gubernatorial race, earning 0.21% of the vote. The party gained the endorsement of United We Stand America in 1995 and fielded approximately 60 candidates for the New Jersey General Assembly, as well as candidates in all districts for the 1998 U.S. House of Representatives elections. In 2001, it was involved in a lawsuit advocating for New Jersey voters to have the right to join third parties. Following the election of Donald Trump in 2016, third-party registrations surged across New Jersey, with the Conservative Party becoming the state's fourth-largest political party by 2018.

=== New York ===
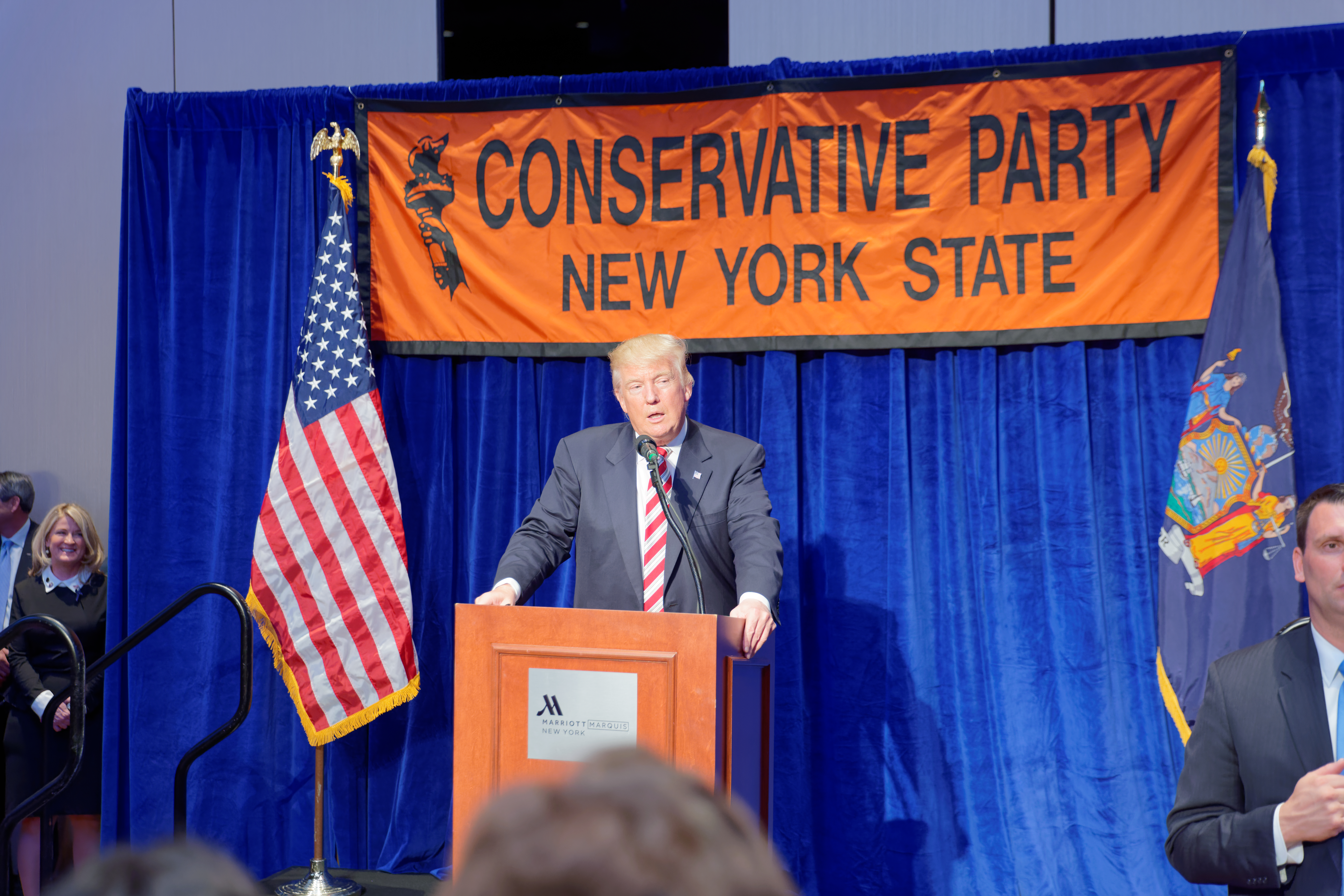
Donald Trump accepting the Conservative Party's nomination for President in 2016.

In 1962, the Conservative Party of New York State was established in response to dissatisfaction with the perceived liberalism of New York's Republican Party. Using New York's fusion voting system, which allows candidates to appear on multiple party lines in the same election, the party sought to counterbalance the influence of the Liberal Party of New York. While it often endorses Republican candidates, the party has withheld support from Republicans it considers too liberal.

In 1965, conservative author and commentator William F. Buckley Jr. ran for Mayor of New York City, securing 13.4% of the vote. The following year, academic Paul L. Adams ran for Governor of New York, earning 8.5% of the vote. In 1968, William F. Buckley Jr.'s brother, James L. Buckley, ran for U.S. Senate, garnering 17.31% of the vote. James would later win a seat in the U.S. Senate in 1970, gaining a 38.75% plurality as the Conservative Party candidate. In 1978, William Carney was elected as a Conservative to the U.S. House of Representatives.

The party been described by The New York Times as having "a successful electoral record in a decidedly blue state in which the Conservatives have elbowed the Republican Party to the right." As of 2018, the party holds Row C on New York ballots due to receiving the third-highest number of votes among political parties in multiple gubernatorial elections.

=== Virginia ===
In 1965, a new Conservative Party of Virginia was formed in response to Mills Godwin's nomination as the Democratic candidate for governor, which the party opposed due to his outreach to African-American voters. Around 300 delegates gathered in Richmond, Virginia, to officially establish the party. They nominated William J. Story Jr., the assistant superintendent of schools from Chesapeake, for governor, Reid T. Putney, a forestry consultant from Goochland, for lieutenant governor, and John W. Carter for attorney general. In 1969, the party nominated Beverly McDowell for governor, but he placed fourth in the election, receiving 1.16% of the popular vote.

=== Washington ===
In 1966, Floyd Paxton and other ultra-conservatives founded the Conservative Party of Washington, nominating two candidates for the U.S. House of Representatives and seven for the Washington State Legislature. The party attracted disaffected Republicans critical of Governor Daniel J. Evans and his allies. Though some party leaders supported George Wallace’s 1968 presidential bid, they ultimately ran under the American Independent Party instead of the Conservative Party. In 1968, the party fielded candidates for state offices and Congress under the Constitution Party label, but neither label appeared in the 1970 election.

== See also ==
- Conservative Party (disambiguation)
- Conservatism in the United States
- Republican Party
- National Conservative Political Action Committee
- American Conservative Union
