= Elisha Phelps =

American politician (1779–1847)

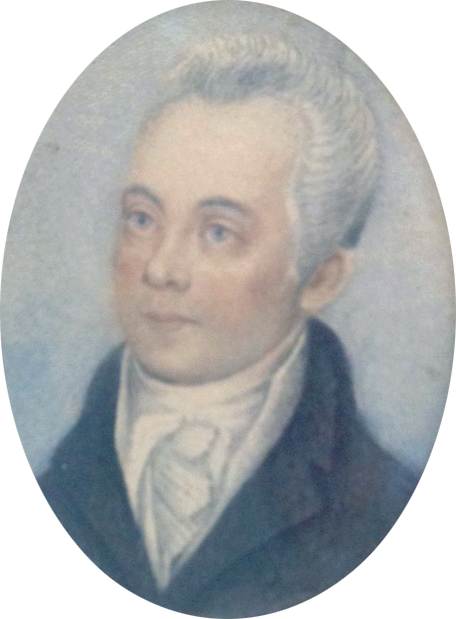
- Portrait of Elisha Phelps by Elkanah Tisdale

2nd Speaker of the Connecticut House of Representatives
- In office 1821–1821
- Preceded by: David Plant
- Succeeded by: Seth P. Beers

7th Speaker of the Connecticut House of Representatives
- In office 1829–1829
- Preceded by: Ebenezer Young
- Succeeded by: Henry W. Edwards

Personal details
- Born: November 16, 1779 Simsbury, Connecticut
- Died: April 6, 1847 (aged 67)
- Party: Toleration (1818–1824); National Republican (1824–1834); Conservative (1838–1839)

Elisha Phelps (November 16, 1779 – April 6, 1847) was a United States representative from Connecticut. He was the son of Noah Phelps and father of John Smith Phelps who was a United States representative from Missouri. He was born in Simsbury, Connecticut. In 1800, he was graduated from Yale College and from Litchfield Law School. He was admitted to the bar in 1803 and began practice in Simsbury.

Phelps was member of the Connecticut House of Representatives in 1807, 1812, and 1814-1818. He was elected as a Toleration Republican to the Sixteenth Congress (March 4, 1819 – March 3, 1821). He was again a member of the Connecticut House of Representatives in 1821 and served as speaker. He served in the Connecticut Senate 1822-1824 and was elected as an Adams candidate to the Nineteenth and Twentieth Congresses (March 4, 1825 – March 3, 1829). He declined to be a candidate for renomination in 1828. After leaving Congress, he was Connecticut comptroller 1831-1837 and again a member of the Connecticut House of Representatives in 1829 and 1835 and served as speaker in 1829. He was appointed a commissioner to revise and codify the state laws in 1835.

In 1838 and 1839, Phelps ran under a Conservative banner for Governor of Connecticut. His attempts were unsuccessful.

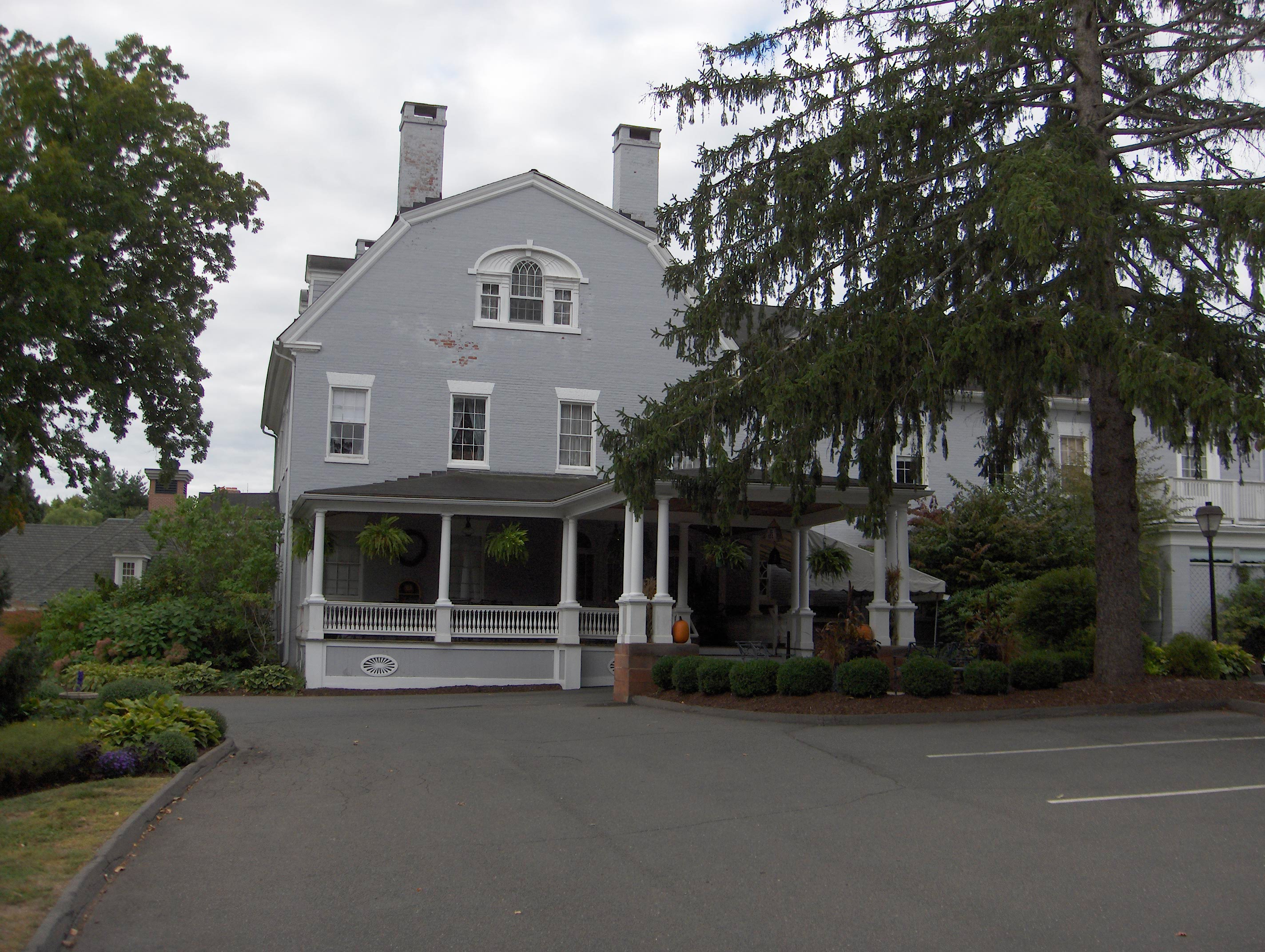
Amos Eno House

Phelps died in Simsbury in 1847 and was buried in Hop Meadow Cemetery.

His home, which he built in 1820, has been renamed the Amos Eno House, after a subsequent owner. It still stands in Simsbury and is on the National Register of Historic Places.

Preceded by James Thomas	Connecticut State Comptroller; 1830–1834	Succeeded by Roger Huntington
U.S. House of Representatives
Preceded by Samuel B. Sherwood	Member of the U.S. House of Representatives from Connecticut's at-large congressional district 1819-1821	Succeeded by Noyes Barber
Preceded by Ebenezer Stoddard	Member of the U.S. House of Representatives from Connecticut's at-large congressional district 1825-1829	Succeeded by William L. Storrs
