= Capt. Elisha Phelps House =

Historic house in Connecticut, United States

- U.S. National Register of Historic Places
- U.S. Historic district – Contributing property
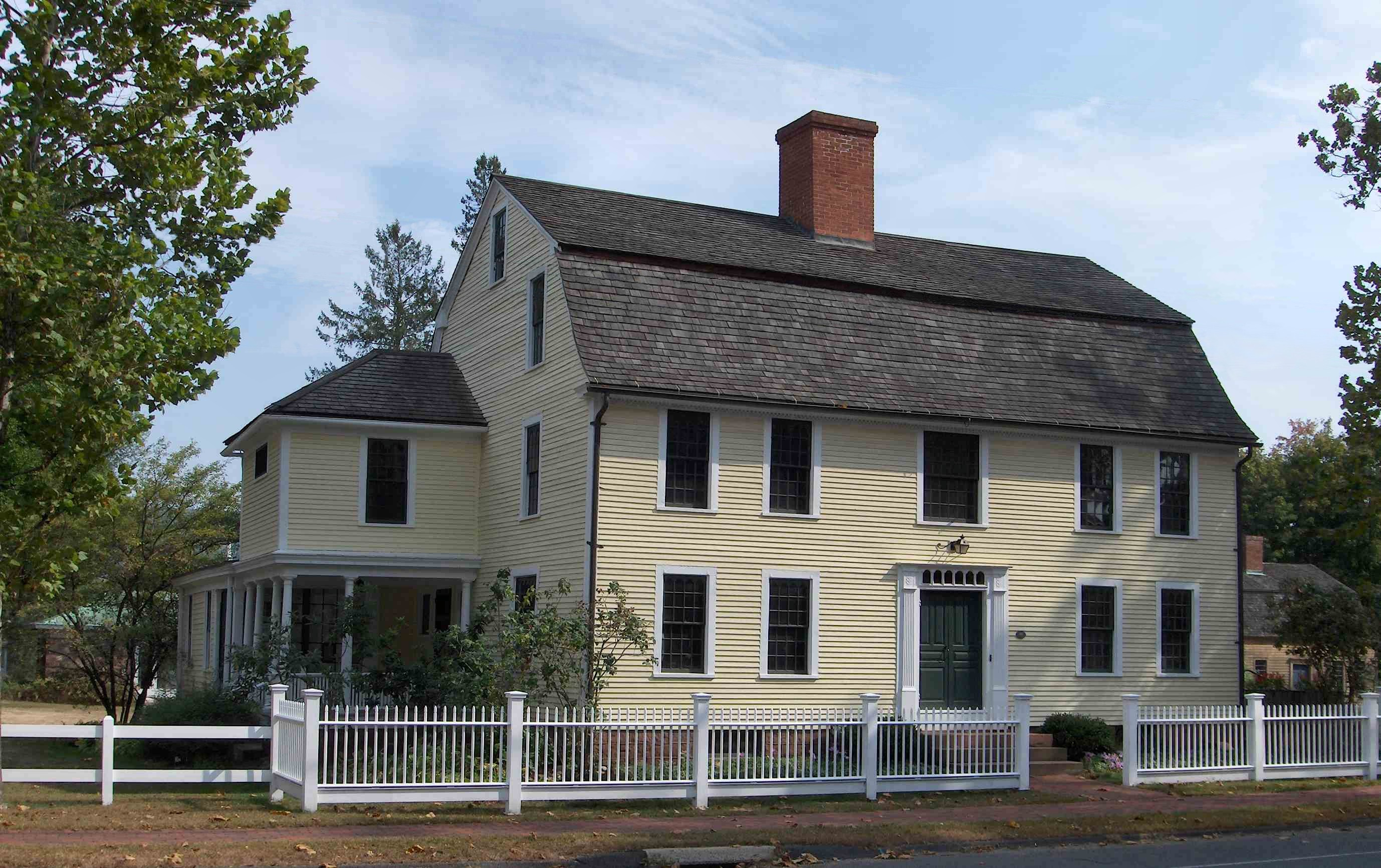
- The historic Capt. Elisha Phelps Tavern House and Museum

- Location within Connecticut Location within the United States
- Location: 800 Hopmeadow Street, Simsbury, Connecticut
- Coordinates: 41.8761°N 72.8013°W
- Area: less than one acre
- Built: 1711, expanded 1771
- Architect: Lt. David Phelps
- Part of: Simsbury Center Historic District (ID96000356)
- NRHP reference No.: 72001345

Significant dates
- Added to NRHP: September 22, 1972
- Designated CP: April 12, 1996

The Captain Elisha Phelps House is a historic house museum at 800 Hopmeadow Street in Simsbury, Connecticut. The colonial-era house was built by David Phelps in 1711. His son Elisha Phelps received the land from his father and expanded the house in 1771. Elisha Phelps along with his brother Noah Phelps and others took part in the capture of Fort Ticonderoga in 1775. Capt. Phelps was appointed as commissary of the Northern Department by the Continental Congress.

The house was used as a hotel named the Canal Hotel, after the War of 1812. It is located along what was the New Haven and Northampton Canal line.

== Family life ==
Elisha Phelps was born at Simsbury, Connecticut, on October 17, 1737. His father David (May 7, 1710–December 9, 1760) married Abigail Pettibone (April 25, 1731–October 16, 1787) on April 25, 1731. Both families descended from original settlers of Dorchester, Massachusetts (and five years later, Windsor, Massachusetts) who as Puritans arrived in the New World aboard the ship Mary and John in 1630.

He died at age 43 in Albany, New York, on July 14, 1776, from diseases he contracted from the soldiers he cared for there. After his death, the homestead passed from his widow and surviving children to his brother Noah Phelps and until 1962 was the property of his descendants, including Jeffrey O. Phelps.

== Phelps Tavern Museum ==
The estate is now known as The Phelps Tavern Museum. The museum uses period rooms and interactive exhibits and galleries to interpret the use of the house as an inn from 1786 to 1849. Three successive generations of the Phelps tavern-keepers are chronicled along with the social history of taverns in New England. From Masonic meetings to ordination balls, the Phelps Tavern hosted townspeople and travelers who arrived by horse, stagecoach and canal.

The Phelps Tavern Museum is part of a 2-acre (8,100 m^{2}) complex that includes a museum store, research archives, and period gardens. It is owned and operated by the Simsbury Historical Society.

== See also ==
- National Register of Historic Places listings in Hartford County, Connecticut
