= Noah Phelps =

American general

Maj. Gen. Noah Phelps
- Born: January 22, 1740; Simsbury, Connecticut
- Died: November 4, 1809 (aged 69); Simsbury, Connecticut
- Occupations: Soldier, lawyer, magistrate
- Known for: Helped to capture Fort Ticonderoga

Major General Noah Phelps (January 22, 1740 – November 4, 1809) served with the Continental Army during the American Revolutionary War and afterward was selected as a major general. He also served as justice of the peace and judge of probate in his home state of Connecticut for twenty years. He was chosen as a delegate to the 1788 state convention that ratified the Constitution of the United States.

== Biography ==
Noah Phelps was born on January 22, 1740, the fourth of nine children, to David Phelps and Abigail Pettibone. David Phelps was the son of Joseph Phelps and his third wife, Mary Case. David married Abigail Pettibone on April 25, 1731 and died of smallpox on December 9, 1760.

Noah married Lydia Griswold of Windsor, Connecticut on June 10, 1761 in Simsbury, Connecticut. They had six children: Noah Amherst (May 3, 1762), Lydia Griswold (February 25, 1764), Chandler Conway (October 22, 1766), George P. (August 18, 1773), Elisha Phelps (November 16, 1779), and a son (November 18, 1783, died at birth).

He held a variety of essential positions, including Surveyor of Lands in the greater Simsbury area in 1772 and 1783. After the war, he was selected as Justice of the Peace for Hartford County in 1782, Judge of Probate in 1787, and Major-General of the Militia, 1796-1799.

Noah Phelps was a leader within the Simsbury community. He chaired the town meeting that passed the Articles of Confederation in January 1778. In November 1787, the meeting picked him and Daniel Humphrey Esq., as delegates for the Convention of the State of Connecticut, set to convene in Hartford in January and vote on whether or not to adopt the federal constitution. They were directed to oppose it, but "one of the delegates though voting as instructed by the town, took occasion to state that his personal convictions led him to favor the proposed constitution." This may have been Phelps.

Phelps died in Simsbury on November 4, 1809. On his tombstone is inscribed: "A Patriot of 1776. To such we are indebted for our Independence."

== Revolutionary War ==
Early in the American Revolutionary War, Phelps was chosen as a member of "Committee of War for the expedition to capture Ft. Ticonderoga and Crown Point." The committee considered the advisability of taking Fort Ticonderoga, then occupied by the British, and in which there was stored a large amount of heavy artillery and other war implements. Capt. Phelps, Barnard Romance, Ephraim Buell, and Capt. Edward Mott, with others, composed this committee, Capt. Mott acting as chairman. They raised £300 (in today's value, €53334 or US$29801.99 ) from the Public Treasury, though guaranteed by several patriotic gentlemen. This fund was placed in the hands of Capt. Phelps and Barnard Romance, with the request that they should go north and press forward this project. This resulted in the great and bloodless victory — the capture of Fort Ticonderoga.

Captain Phelps gathered key intelligence in preparation for the taking of the Fort. Sent out to reconnoiter the southern part of Lake Champlain, he stopped overnight at a farm house some little distance from Fort Ticonderoga. Some British soldiers occupied rooms adjoining Phelps, where they were having a dinner party. Phelps heard them discuss the condition of the fort, and the position taken by the rebels, as they styled the people. Early the next morning, Phelps gained entrance to the fort disguised as a peddler seeking a shave.

"Pretending that his object was to get shaved, he avoided suspicion, and had an opportunity to ascertain the construction, strength, and force of the garrison. And he had the good fortune to elude detection, though as it afterwards appeared, his presence had began [sic] to excite mistrust before he left the garrison."

While returning through the fort, the commander accompanied him talking with him about the rebels, their object and movements. Phelps, upon seeing a portion of the exterior wall in a dilapidated condition, remarked that it would afford a feeble defense against the rebels, if they should attack in that quarter. The commander replied, "Yes, but that is not our greatest misfortune. All our powder is damaged, and before we can use it, we are obliged to dry and sift it."

Phelps soon after left the fort, hiring a boatman to take him down the lake in a small boat. He entered the boat in full view and under the guns of the fort. He requested the boatman to row hard that he might terminate the journey as soon as possible. The boatman asked him to take an oar and assist. This Phelps declined to do, as he was still in full view by the fort. As a peddler he would not usually have known how to handle an oar.

After rounding a point that blocked their view from the fort, Phelps quickly took up an oar. A strong active man as well as a good oarsman, he excited the suspicion of the oarsman. The boatman remarked with an oath, 'You have seen an oar before now, sir.' The boatman suspected that Phelps was a rebel, but he feared the man's superior strength, so did not try to return him to the fort. This the boatman confessed to Capt. Phelps after the British surrendered the fort.

Capt. Phelps returned safely to his command, and reported the intelligence he had gained to General Ethan Allen. This enabled the attacking force to plan a surprise dawn raid and take the fort without bloodshed.

== Trenton and Princeton ==
At about this time Phelps raised a militia company mostly at his own expense, and was appointed captain. He served under Col. Ward, and was at Fort Lee. After joining General George Washington's army, he was at the battles of Trenton and Princeton. Later he acted as commissary. In that role, he had to provide troops with all manner of supplies, including guns and bayonets, clothing, "victualing and liquor," and lodgings for his troops and horses. After the war he was chosen Maj. Gen. of militia.
