= Fifth Avenue Hotel =

Hotel in Manhattan, New York (1859–1908)

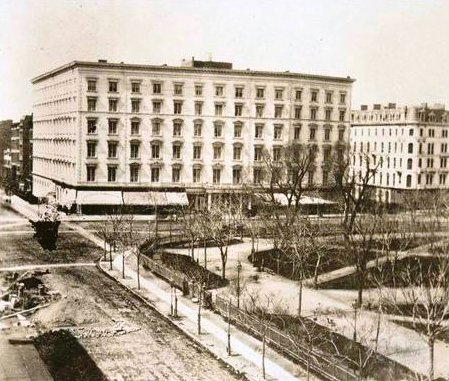
- (1860)

General information
- Construction started: 1856
- Completed: 1859
- Inaugurated: August 23, 1859
- Demolished: 1908
- Owner: Amos R. Eno

Design and construction
- Architect: Griffith Thomas with William Washburn

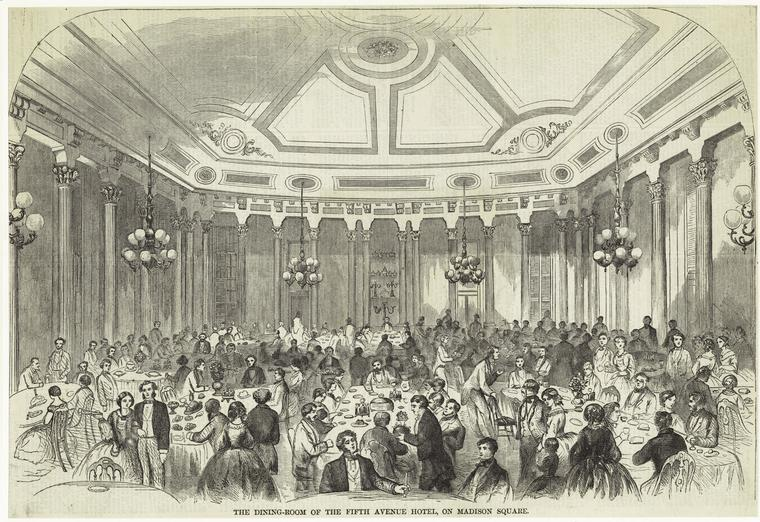
Illustration of the Fifth Avenue Hotel dining room, Harper's Weekly (1859)

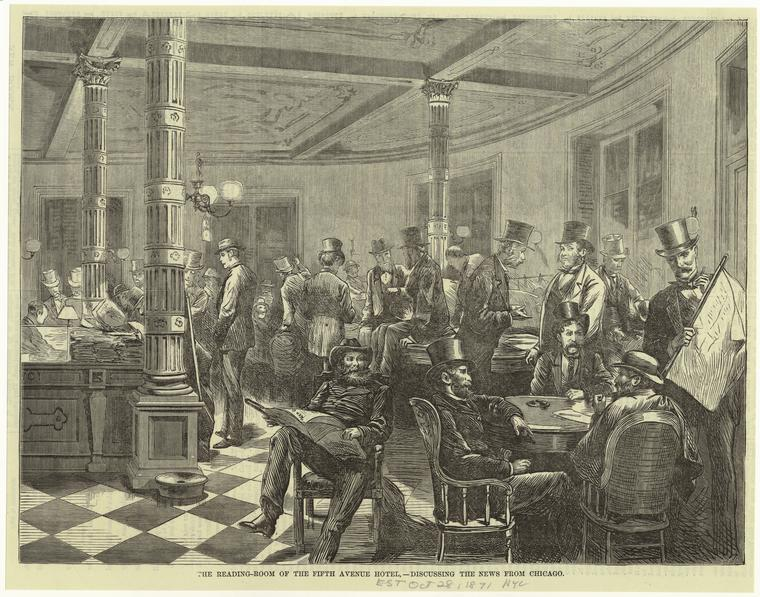
Illustration of the Fifth Avenue Hotel reading room, Every Saturday (1871)

The Fifth Avenue Hotel was a luxury hotel located in Manhattan, New York City from 1859 to 1908. It had an entire block of frontage between 23rd Street and 24th Street, at the southwest corner of Madison Square.

== Site and construction ==
On the site of the Fifth Avenue Hotel

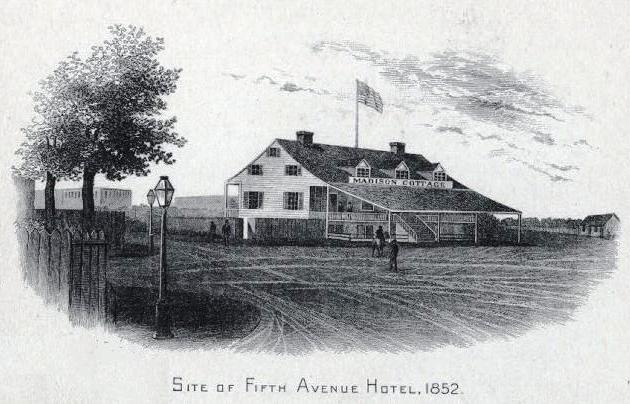
Madison Cottage or Corporal Thompson's Roadhouse, 1852

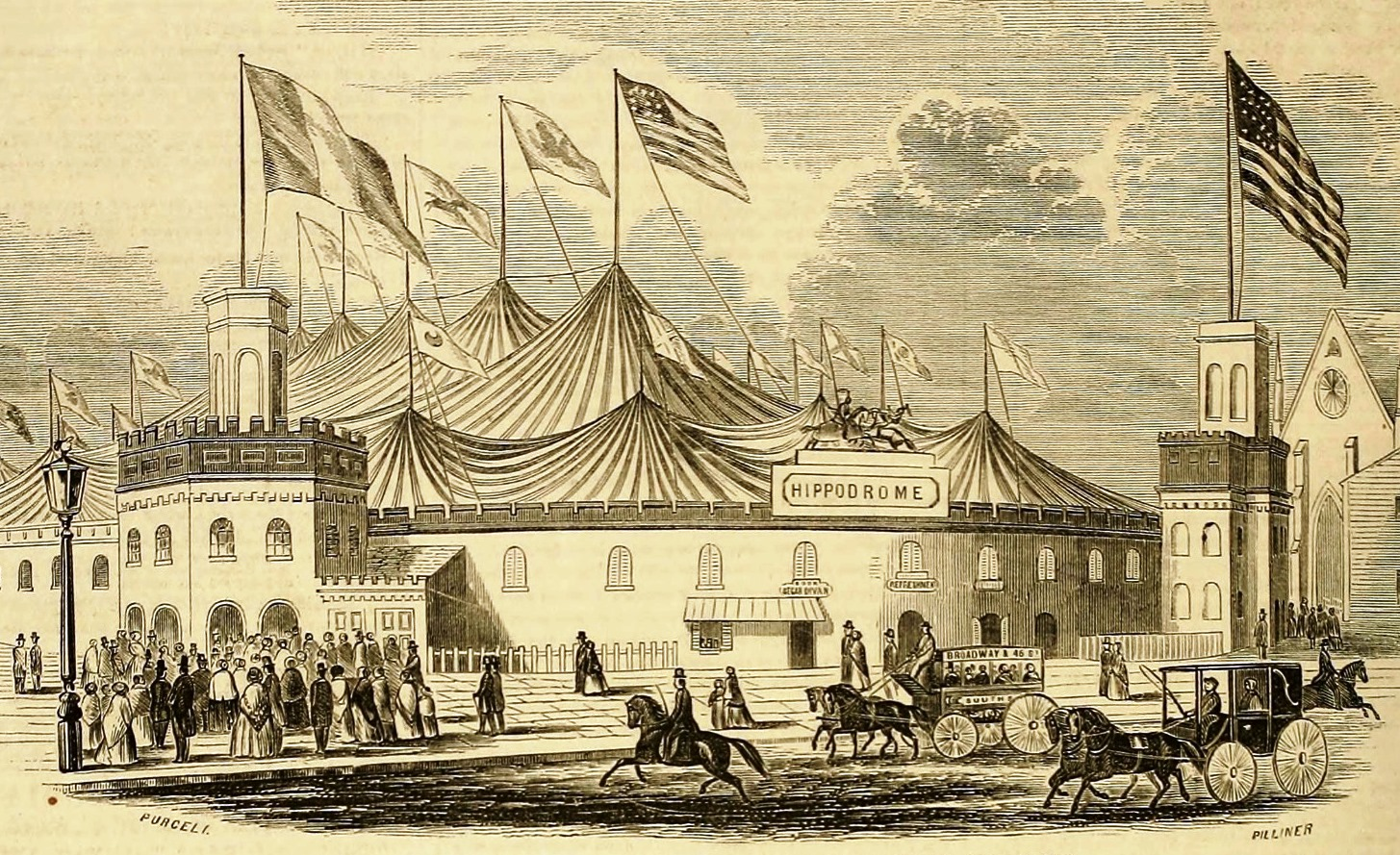
Franconi’s Hippodrome, 1853

The site was previously the location of Madison Cottage, (Note: The farmhouse of John Horn, from which the Bloomingdale Road took its start, was shifted from its position in the middle of the surveyed but unbuilt Fifth Avenue in November 1839. (Kelley, Frank Bergen and Hagaman, Edward (1909)Historical Guide to the City of New York New York: City History Club of New York. p.112) which was a stagecoach stop for passengers headed north from the city. From 1853 to 1856 it was the site of Franconi's Hippodrome, a tent-like structure of canvas and wood which could accommodate up to 10,000 spectators who watched chariot races and other "Amusements of the Ancient Greeks and Romans". (Note: "This huge arena seated about six thousand people with room for three thousand standees. The structure was rather an immense tent than a building. Pageants with elephants and camels, chariot races, and gladiatorial contests in keeping with the Roman name were staged there for two seasons, but the enterprise was not a financial success." Patterson, Jerry E. (1998) Fifth Avenue: The Best Address)

The Fifth Avenue Hotel was built in 1856–59 by Amos Richards Eno at the cost of $2 million. The building was designed by Griffith Thomas with William Washburn. Due to the site's location away from the city center, the hotel was labelled as "Eno's Folly" (Note: For comparison, Fifth Avenue's first hotel, the stylish Brevoort Hotel, opened just eight years earlier (1851), stood on the northeast corner at Eighth Street.) during construction.

Following the hotel's opening, it became "the social, cultural political hub of elite New York," and brought in a quarter of a million dollars a year in profits. The Fifth Avenue Hotel spurred development of additional hotels to the north and west, to the north of the Madison Square Park, an area known in the 21st century as the NoMad neighborhood.

== Design and accommodations ==
The Fifth Avenue Hotel was constructed of brick and white marble, and stood at five stories over a commercial ground floor. The first example of Otis Tufts' "vertical screw railway," the first passenger elevator installed in a hotel in the United States, (Note: Patented August 9, 1859. As late as 1908 a tablet in one of the hotel's elevators recorded its former site. The unwieldy elevator was replaced by Tufts' rope elevator in 1879, according to Walsh, William Shepard (1913) A Handy Book of Curious Information. p.334) a notable but cumbersome feature powered by a stationary steam engine carried passengers to the upper floors by a revolving screw that passed through the center of the passenger cab.

The building was of a plain Italianate palazzo-front design, with a projecting tin cornice, but its sober exterior contained richly appointed public rooms: Harper's Weekly reviewed its "heavy masses of gilt wood, rich crimson or green curtains, extremely handsome rose-wood and brocatelle suits, (Note: Suites of rosewood furniture with brocatelle marble tops is meant.) rich carpets... the whole presenting about as handsome and as comfortless an appearance as any one need wish for." A correspondent for The Times of London, in New York to cover the visit of the Prince of Wales in 1860, called the hotel "a larger and more handsome building than Buckingham Palace."

The hotel employed 400 servants to serve its guests, offered private bathrooms (an unprecedented amenity at the time) and ran advertisements featuring a fireplace in every room. Some critics argued that the success of the hotel is a sign that elite New Yorkers were rejecting the republican values of their forefathers, and had begun to value grandeur, luxury and comfort instead.

== Notable events and uses ==
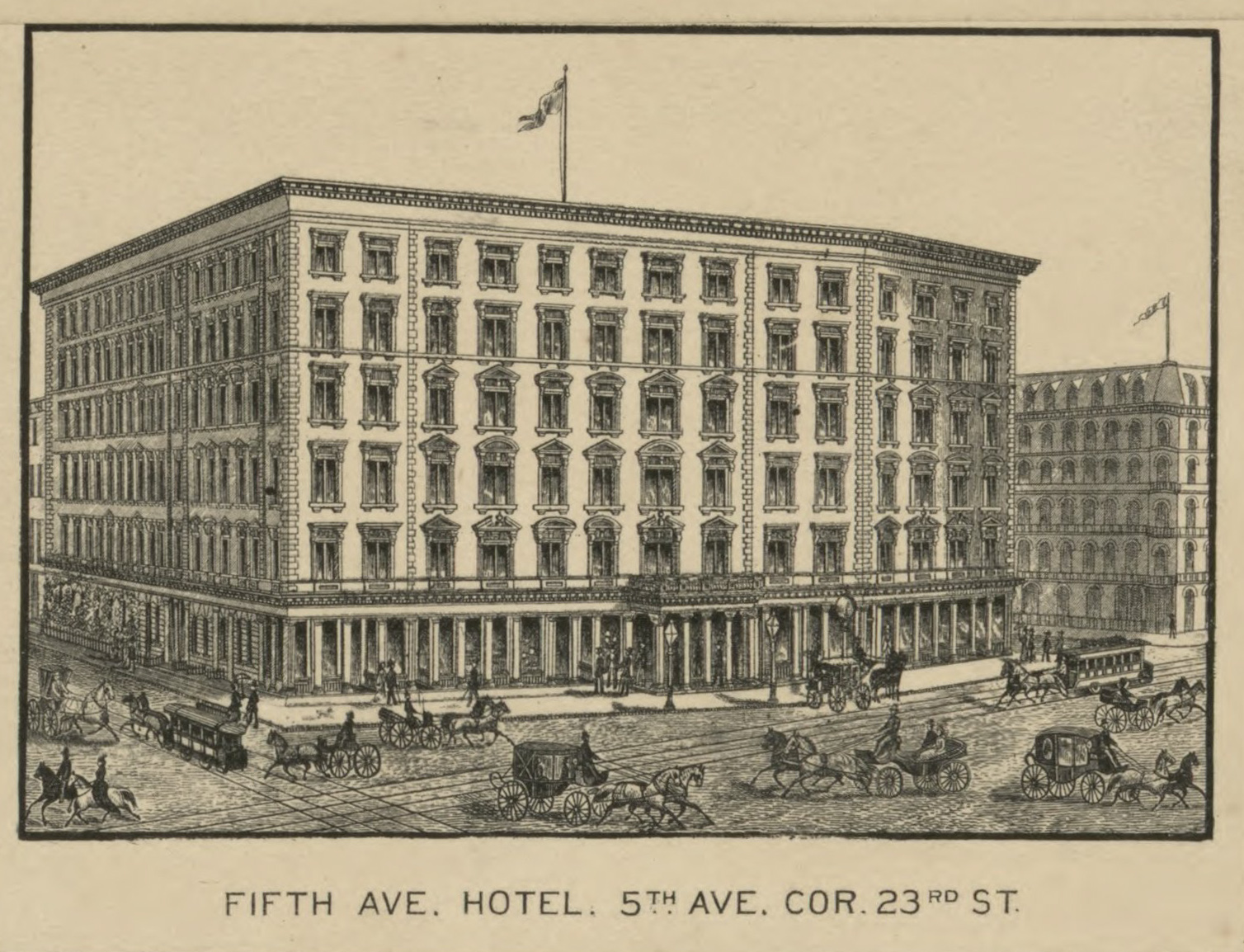
The Fifth Avenue Hotel, depicted on the Taylor Map of New York (1879)

The hotel was host to numerous notable guests, both foreign and domestic, and was, for a time, the most exclusive hotel in the city, and the center of social life for elite New Yorkers.

During the Civil War, Major General George B. McClellan moved into the hotel shortly after he was relieved from command of the Army of the Potomac in November 1862, after his failure to crush Robert E. Lee's Army of Northern Virginia at the Battle of Antietam. Nevertheless, McClellan, a Democrat, was received as a hero in New York, the North's largest Democratic stronghold. The day that he arrived, the street in front of the hotel was crammed with cheering and shouting people hoping for a sight of him, while a band played and a local militiaman set off a small piece of field artillery at intervals. The crowd reacted with even more enthusiasm when McClellan made an appearance on a hotel balcony. Two years later, shortly before Election Day, as the presidential candidate of the Democratic Party, McClellan reviewed a massive 2 1/2 hour long torchlight parade of his supporters from a balcony of the hotel. It was one of only two personal appearances he made during the entire election campaign, which he lost to Abraham Lincoln. McClellan once again received the approbation of a crowd of supporters from a Fifth Avenue Hotel balcony on September 29, 1868, when the Civil War veterans of the McClellan Legion – an organization of veterans, formed for the 1864 campaign, charged with getting out the vote of soldiers who had been discharged or were on sick leave or furlough – marched past in review from dusk until almost midnight.

President Ulysses S. Grant's 1868 presidential campaign began at a dinner party in the hotel, and he and his cabinet once held an official session there. On September 20, 1873, Grant came to New York in response to the start of the financial Panic of 1873, and held a series of meetings at the hotel the next day with financiers, brokers, bankers and railroad executive, all wanting Grant to take steps to stabilize the economy, but Grant lacked the tools which later presidents would have to deal with the economy, as there was no central bank, no Federal Reserve system, to take necessary measures. After the presidential campaign of 1880, in which Grant campaigned for James Garfield, he and his wife Julia moved into the hotel for the winter.

The celebrity lawyer Chester A. Arthur – who later became President of the United States – kept a suite for his office; Edward, Prince of Wales, stayed here on his North American tour, as did his brother-in-law the Duke of Argyll, Dom Pedro of Brazil and Prince Agustín de Iturbide y Green of Mexico, Maximilian's adopted son. The celebrated New York City physician, Dr. John Franklin Gray, lived at the hotel.

The hotel was also "...a gathering place for fat cats like Boss Tweed, Jay Gould, Jim Fisk and Commodore Vanderbilt, who would trade stocks here after hours." When the superbly confident young Fisk – soon to be known as "Diamond Jim", one of the Gilded Age's premier robber barons – first arrived in New York, he stayed at the Fifth Avenue Hotel until he was temporarily ruined.

On October 20, 1873, representatives from Yale, Columbia, Princeton, and Rutgers Universities met at the Fifth Avenue Hotel to codify the first set of college football rules. Before this meeting, each school had its own set of rules and games were usually played using the home team's own particular code. At this meeting, a list of rules, based more on The Football Association's rules than the rules of the recently founded Rugby Football Union, was drawn up for intercollegiate football games.

On May 21, 1881, the United States Tennis Association was founded in the Fifth Avenue Hotel.

In 1886, retired General of the United States Army William Tecumseh Sherman resided at the Fifth Avenue Hotel upon his move from St. Louis, Missouri to New York City; he stayed until he had purchased a house in the city.

=== In literature ===
In 1867, during his only visit to the United States, Jules Verne and his brother Paul stayed in the hotel. This stay is fictionalized in his 1871 novel A Floating City. The Fifth Avenue Hotel also appears in Twenty Thousand Leagues Under the Seas as the hotel where Professor Aronnax stays at the beginning of the novel.

Gore Vidal made the Fifth Avenue Hotel a setting in his novel 1876, for it was in a suite here that John C. Reid, editor of The New York Times woke the Republican National Committee chairman Zachariah Chandler, and worked out the campaign for the controversial presidential election of 1876.

=== "Amen Corner" ===
The Fifth Avenue Hotel was known as a stronghold of the Republican Party. From a corner nook in one of the public rooms, which he dubbed his "Amen Corner", Republican political boss Thomas Collier Platt controlled patronage in New York City and state for a few years in the 1890s; here he held his "Sunday School", where projects did not go forward until they had his "amen".

== Closing and demolition ==
The Fifth Avenue Hotel closed at midnight on April 4, 1908 and was demolished. It was reported that patrons of the hotel's bar spent $7,000 in drinks during its last day of operation.

Its site was occupied in 1909 by an office building known as the Fifth Avenue Building (later changed to Toy Center). The building was designed by Robert Maynicke and Julius Franke, for Eno's grandson, Henry Lane Eno. Until 2007 it housed the International Toy Center, which was filled with wholesale buyers come the February Toy Fair and then again in October. The old hotel's name was taken up by a Fifth Avenue Hotel at 24 Fifth Avenue, designed by Emery Roth, later converted to apartments. In December of 2023, a new hospitality property took on the name located at 28th Street and Fifth Avenue, designed by Perkins Eastman and interior by Martin Brudnizki.

A plaque on the Toy Center, the building currently on the site, commemorates the hotel.

== See also ==
- List of former hotels in Manhattan
